= Rebecca Schiffman =

- Origin: New York City, New York, United States
- Genres: Indie-Folk
- Labels: Fayettenam Records, Recommended if You Like Records, Some Records
- Website: Personal Site

Rebecca Schiffman is a singer-songwriter, jewelry designer, and visual artist from New York City.

== Biography ==
Rebecca Schiffman was born and raised in New York City and now resides in Los Angeles.

== Music career ==
Rebecca Schiffman studied cello and piano from a young age. She later picked up guitar and in high school joined classmate Colin Kindley to form The Meaningful and Wise whose sound was influenced by The Buzzcocks and The Soft Boys. Schiffman soon began writing and recording her own songs on a 4-Track in her bedroom. In 2000–2001, while attending The Cooper Union School of Art, Schiffman played bass guitar for the pop-punk band Pearl Harbor, whose other members were Walter Schreifels (Quicksand, Rival Schools) on drums, Ryan Stratton (Walking Concert) on guitar, and Masayoshi Nakamura on vocals. Schreifels then produced Schiffman's first album "Upside Down Lacrimosa," which included new recordings of many songs from her 4-track demos. It was released on Some Records in 2003. In 2009, Schiffman self-released her second album "To Be Good for a Day" which she co-produced with Michael Musmanno in Brooklyn. The album was named "Best Album of the Month" in the February 2009 issue of Vice Magazine. In 2010, Schiffman's song "Aaron" was featured in the soundtrack to Lena Dunham's breakout film "Tiny Furniture." Schiffman also lent her vocals to "When U Come Home" by Teddy Blanks which plays during the movie's end credits. Schiffman's vocals also appear on another Teddy Blanks song for the soundtrack to Alex Karpovsky's movie "Red Flag". In 2016, Schiffman's self-titled third album came out on Fayettenam Records. It was produced by Money Mark and featured Nels Cline on guitar. Also in 2016, Schiffman recorded a cover version of the theme song for the TV show Squidbillies. The episode with her version aired in August of that year.

=== Line-Up ===
Rebecca Schiffman performs solo as well as with a variety of musicians.

Past Band Members

- Reka Reisinger - Keyboard, Back-up Vocals
- Jay Israelson - Piano
- Christopher Bear - Drums
- Paul Jenkins - Bass guitar
- Ryan Stratton - Bass guitar, Guitar
- Mike Stroud - Guitar, Keyboard
- Dan Crowell - Drums
- James Ransone - Bass
- John MF Anderson - Guitar
- Ethan Glazer - Bass
- Matt Bogdanow - Drums

=== Discography ===
==== Albums ====
Upside Down Lacrimosa (September 23, 2003, Some Records)
Personnel: Rebecca Schiffman, Walter Schreifels, Colin Kindley, Mike Stroud, Mike Skinner, Andy Action, Chuck Scott, Tom Hutten, Jordan Rosenblum (artwork)

To Be Good for a Day (January 28, 2009, Self-released)
Personnel: Rebecca Schiffman, Mike Musmanno, Jay Israelson, Don Piper, Alex Walker, Tony Leone, Ryan Stratton, Matthew Morandi, Peter Toh, Benjamin Degen (artwork)

Rebecca Schiffman (self-titled) (digital August 12, 2016, Fayettenam Records), (vinyl January 3, 2017, Fayettenam Records)
Personnel: Rebecca Schiffman, Money Mark, Nels Cline, Jay Israelson, Ethan Glazer, Mike Bloom, Clinton Patterson, Justin Sullivan Angelo Hatgistavrou, Max Bernstein, Eric Broucek, Jeff Kolhede, Manuel Jimenez, Raina Hamner (cover photo), CHIPS (design)

== Art career ==
Rebecca Schiffman graduated from The Cooper Union School of Art with a BFA. Her paintings have been included in group shows at Ratio3 in San Francisco and the now closed New York City gallery, Guild & Greyshkul. In 2006, Rebecca Schiffman and fellow Cooper Union alum, Javier Hernandez exhibited paintings in a two-person exhibition titled "Faster Sleeper" at The Bas Fisher Invitational gallery in Miami, Florida. Schiffman's watercolor portrait of philosopher Slavoj Žižek appears on book jacket for the UK edition of his book "Violence."

== Jewelry Design ==
Rebecca Schiffman studied wax carving for three years with the Dutch-born master model maker Fred de Vos in New York. Previously she earned a certificate in casting and mold making from Studio Jewelers in New York. In 2009, Schiffman launched her Ill-Made Knight (IMK) Collection of chainmail accessories. IMK was carried by Henri Bendel and featured in Nylon Magazine and Jalouse Magazine, among other publications. In 2011, Rebecca Schiffman used Kickstarter and her wax carving skills to launch her "Upper East Side Collection" of sterling silver jewelry inspired by architectural ornament in her native neighborhood. The collection was profiled in The New York Times. Schiffman was then invited by the Metropolitan Transportation Authority to design a similar collection for Grand Central Terminal's centennial anniversary. The musician and artist Grimes has performed wearing Schiffman's chainmail jewelry, including at both 2016 Coachella performances. The musician Neko Case has also worn Schiffman's chainmail jewelry.
