= Dead Heavens =

American rock band

- Drew Thomas, Paul Kostabi, Nathan Aguilar, Walter Schreifels

Background information
- Origin: New York City, United States
- Genres: hard rock, post-hardcore, alternative rock
- Years active: 2013–present
- Labels: Thrill Me! Records, Velvet Elk Records, Dine Alone Records
- Members: Walter Schreifels; Nathan Aguilar; Paul Kostabi; Drew Thomas
- Website: deadheavens.com

Dead Heavens is an American rock band consisting of vocalist/guitarist Walter Schreifels (Gorilla Biscuits, Quicksand, Rival Schools), guitarist Paul Kostabi (Youth Gone Mad, White Zombie), bass guitarist Nathan Aguilar (Cults), and drummer Drew Thomas (Youth of Today, Into Another, Bold). Their sound is an amalgamation of many genres, drawn from the members' previous work in hardcore punk, post-hardcore, alternative rock, and indie rock, as well as their collective interest in classic rock, stoner rock, blues rock, and psychedelic rock. Their name was inspired by the 1972 counterculture film An American Hippie in Israel.

== History ==
Dead Heavens initially began on Schreifels' 2013 solo tour, which featured Aguilar and Thomas as his backing band. Upon returning from the tour, Aguilar introduced Schreifels and Thomas to Paul Kostabi, the owner of Thunderdome Studios. It was at this studio where the four musicians started jamming and recording ideas together, with Kostabi's massive collection of 70s recording reels from the likes of James Gang, Black Sabbath, and Jimi Hendrix playing in between takes for inspiration.

In early 2014, the quartet began playing live shows as Walter Schreifels Band, mixing some of Schreifels' previous bands' songs along with new blues-inspired jams. Over the course of the year, now featuring heavier dual guitar leads, they transitioned from a solo project into a fully collaborative group effort. In October, they began using the name Walter Schreifels and the Dead Heavens, eventually shortening it to Dead Heavens as of February 2015, at which point they were performing with a full set of new material.

Between 2015 and 2017, the band toured the US numerous times and put out four singles on different labels, culminating with the release of their first full-length album, Whatever Witch You Are. While not officially disbanded, Dead Heavens has been on hiatus since the reformation of Quicksand in mid-2017.

== Members ==
Nathan Aguilar – bass guitar
Paul Kostabi – guitar
Walter Schreifels – vocals, guitar
Drew Thomas – drums

== Discography ==
"History in My Hands"/"36 Chambers" (7", Thrill Me! Records, 17 February 2015)
"Adderall Highway"/"Hyacinth" (7", Velvet Elk Records, 25 September 2015)
"Feel Low"/"I'm So Green" (7", Thrill Me! Records, 12 February 2016)
"Away from the Speed"/"Isn't Wrong" (7"/cassette, Dine Alone Records, 16 June 2017)
Whatever Witch You Are (LP/CD/cassette/8-track, Dine Alone Records, 23 June 2017)
