= Bring On the Psychics =

Studio album by Quicksand
- Released: July 17, 2026
- Studio: The Animal Farm (Flemington)
- Genre: Post-hardcore
- Length: 29:38
- Label: Equal Vision
- Producer: Jon Markson

Quicksand chronology
Split (2024)	Bring On the Psychics (2026)

Singles from Bring On the Psychics
- 1. "Get to It" Released: April 23, 2026; 2. "Regenerate" Released: April 23, 2026; 3. "Crystallize" Released: May 21, 2026; 4. "Cool Guy" Released: June 18, 2026

Bring On the Psychics is the fifth studio album by the American post-hardcore band Quicksand, scheduled for release on July 17, 2026. Produced by Jon Markson, the album was recorded over a 10-day period. It was announced on April 23, 2026, alongside the release of the lead singles "Get to It" and "Regenerate". Two further singles, "Crystallize" and "Cool Guy", followed on May 21 and June 18, respectively.

== Background and release ==
On April 23, 2026, Quicksand announced their fifth studio album Bring On the Psychics. The announcement was accompanied by the release of the singles "Get to It" and "Regenerate", with a music video for "Get to It". A music video for "Regenerate" followed on May 4, while "Crystallize" and "Cool Guy" were released as the third and fourth singles on May 21 and June 18, respectively, each accompanied by a music video. All four videos were directed by Jesse Korman.

Bring On the Psychics was released on July 17, 2026, through Equal Vision Records. It is Quicksand's first full-length album since Distant Populations (2021) and their first to be released through Equal Vision, following the label's release of the band's split EP Split (2024) with Hot Water Music. The album also includes "Supercollider", which first appeared on the EP.

== Development ==
Bring On the Psychics was produced and mixed by Jon Markson. According to the band's press release, recording took place over a 10-day period. On the album, the vocalist and guitarist Walter Schreifels said he revisited many of his earlier influences, looking back in particular to Break Down the Walls (1986) by Youth of Today, on which he played bass, and Start Today (1989) by Gorilla Biscuits, on which he played guitar. He described the albums as "speaking to the time and providing possible paths to a better future... with mosh parts", saying that he wanted to bring the same energy to Bring On the Psychics.

== Composition ==
According to the band's press release, the flow of Bring On the Psychics "serves as the sonic bridge between [Quicksand's] heavy and influential Nineties sound and the ambitious, experimental output contained within its more recent era."

=== Songs ===
Schreifels said that with "Get to It" and "Regenerate", the band wanted to do something "high-energy and straightforward with a positive feeling". Tom Breihan of Stereogum compared the songs' "churning, bouncing energy" to early Deftones, adding that "Get to It" expanded on the New York hardcore sound Schreifels had played before that band's emergence. Gregory Adams of Revolver described the song as a "sleek-chorded, but gain-surged pound", and characterized "Regenerate" as a "classically melodic and head-bobbing Quicksand groove". Lyrically, "Get to It" addresses procrastination, which Schreifels said he has struggled with throughout his life. He described the song as being about "getting to it" and "poking holes in the excuses for standing still", calling it "the voice in your head calling bullshit on all the ways we overthink." Schreifels said that "Regenerate" is about "finding new paths forward". He added that "life will keep taking things away from you", but that such experiences are how people "learn and grow" and "get back up from a hard hit."

"Cool Guy" is driven by a grinding bass line and "atypical guitar chord choices". A post-hardcore song, Langdon Hickman of Consequence called it a "short, uncomplicated post-hardcore song", while Adams described it as a "melodic, yet pound-forward post-hardcore groover" and found that it draws inspiration from early hardcore. Lyrically, "Cool Guy" is a diss track targeting the so-called "cool guys" of the hardcore scene. Quicksand described the song as "an OG HC diss track" in the vein of Minor Threat's "Small Man, Big Mouth" and Negative Approach's "Hypocrite", with Adams also mentioning Gorilla Biscuits' "Big Mouth" as another possible point of reference. According to Adams, Schreifels suggests that "the loudest person in the room" can sometimes be the weakest and "reiterates that they should stop talking shit". Danielle Chelosky of Stereogum noted that "After many lyrics about a self-proclaimed Cool Guy who '[brings] everyone down' and 'always [tries] a little too much,'… Schreifels contemplates that maybe he himself is the problem, and then dismisses the thought immediately."

"Crystallize" pairs a mid-tempo drum beat and a two-chord guitar riff. Adams described the song as both "pounding and pensive", writing that the beat "rumbl[es] the speakers" while the riff is "to-the-point, yet oddly pretty". The band characterized its sound as "post-punk self-actualization-core meets 1960s Batman fight scene". Adams wrote that lyrically, Schreifels "gently coos and anxiously shouts" about days gone by while keeping himself present and not missing out on the world around him.

== Critical reception ==
Professional ratings
Review scores
Source	Rating
AllMusic	4/5 stars
Distorted Sound	8/10
Punknews.org	3.5/5 stars

In a positive review, Gavin Brown of Distorted Sound wrote that the album showed Quicksand "still sounding as vital as ever", adding that the band's "pedigree shines through on this new album, just as it has throughout their career". Breihan described the album as "short, punchy, and beautifully paced", writing that "even on the few slower and prettier songs, the energy never flags".

Renaldo69 of Punknews.org gave a more mixed assessment, writing that while Bring On the Psychics was "not a bad Quicksand album, or a bad record in general", some sections felt "a bit tame" and suggested that the band had "played it safe". He concluded that the album "may be flawed in certain spots, but it has powerful themes and sufficient tracks that'll remind us why we sank deep into Quicksand in the first place."

== Track listing ==
All tracks are written by Quicksand.

Bring On the Psychics track listing
No.	Title	Length
1.	"Get to It"	2:44
2.	"Regenerate"	2:55
3.	"Agency"	2:38
4.	"Crystallize"	2:18
5.	"Supercollider"	2:50
6.	"In Full Color"	2:50
7.	"Days You Run To"	5:36
8.	"Cool Guy"	2:09
9.	"Moving Forward"	2:54
10.	"Bring On the Psychics"	2:44
Total length:		29:38

== Personnel ==
Credits are adapted from the album's liner notes and Tidal.

=== Quicksand ===
- Alan Cage – drums
- Walter Schreifels – lead vocals, guitars
- Sergio Vega – bass guitar

=== Additional contributors ===
- Jon Markson – production, engineering, mixing
- Rob Chiarappa – production assistance, engineering assistance, mixing assistance
- Mike Kalajian – mastering
- Othelo Gervacio – cover art
- Nick Steinhardt – packaging design
- Jesse Reed – packaging design

== Charts ==
Chart performance for Bring On the Psychics
Chart (2026)	Peak position
UK Album Downloads (Official Charts)	62
US Top Album Sales (Billboard)	37
