= Pedals (Rival Schools album) =

Studio album by Rival Schools
- Released: March 8, 2011
- Recorded: 2009
- Studios: House of Love, Brooklyn, New York; Studio G
- Genres: Emo; pop rock; post-hardcore
- Length: 34:28
- Label: Photo Finish
- Producer: Rival Schools

Rival Schools chronology
United by Fate (2001)	Pedals (2011)	Found (2013)

Singles from Pedals
- 1. "Shot After Shot" Released: November 17, 2010; 2. "Wring It Out" Released: February 25, 2011; 3. "Eyes Wide Open" Released: August 5, 2011

Pedals is the second studio album from post-hardcore band Rival Schools, released nearly 10 years after their debut record United by Fate was first released.

Glassjaw and Head Automatica frontman Daryl Palumbo remixed the track "Choose Your Adventure".

== Background and production ==
Following the demise of Quicksand, frontman Walter Schreifels formed Rival Schools at the recommendation of his label Island Records. The band consisted of Schreifels, and hardcore punk veterans Sam Siegler on drums, Cache Tolman on bass; guitarist Ian Love joined months later. The band released United by Fate in September 2001, and promoted it through to mid-2002. In December that same year, Love announced his departure from the group, choosing to focus on his side project Cardia. In early 2003, Chris Traynor of Bush was announced as their new guitarist, and the band recorded their second album. Island Records subsequently shelved it, and the group broke up. Schreifels moved to Berlin, Germany, produced albums for Hot Water Music and CIV, formed Walking Concert, reunited his first band Gorilla Biscuits, and moved to Williamsburg, Brooklyn. Siegler joined Nightmare of You, and Traynor and Tolman formed Institute.

Rival Schools reformed in April 2008, which Schreifels credited to the Gorilla Biscuits reunion: "I longed for the togetherness that defines Rival Schools." They appeared at a variety of festivals and went on a UK tour. During a performance at Download Festival, they debuted four new songs. The band wrote some new material and made demos shortly after the reunion; they wrote an additional five-or-six prior to entering a studio. On January 27, 2009, the band announced they had begun recording a new album, and eventually finished in late 2009. The majority of the album was done at House of Love in Brooklyn, New York, with the band producing and Love handling recording. Additional recording was held at Studio G, with Joel Hamilton and assistance by Francisco Botero. Love mixed "Wring It Out" and "The Ghost Is Out There", Chris Sheldon mixed "69 Guns", "Eyes Wide Open" and "Shot After Shot", with the remainder being done by Hamilton. Will Quinnell mastered the recordings at Sterling Sound.

== Composition ==
Pedals has been described as an emo, pop rock and post-hardcore release, utilizing less distortion and a lack of heavy sound that was prevalent on United by Fate. Schreifels said the writing was informed by the experiences the members had while in their various other bands between 2003 and 2008. He focused more of his efforts on writing melodies and lyrics, returning to similar themes he had tackled previously. Schreifels' grunge-esque vocals had developed into a raspy baritone. The title Pedals referred to the situations that lead up to the making of the album, as Schreifels explains: "Sometimes we're pedaling uphill. There's a lot of movement and organization", in addition to using various effects pedals.

The opening track "Wring It Out" featured four different guitar parts, and a bassline that recalled the one in "Travel by Telephone", the opening track from United by Fate. "69 Guns" sees an arpeggio part ascending over melodic riffs and feedback. It uses acoustic guitars, as well as a piano during the bridge section. The title is a reference to the Alarm track "68 Guns". "Eyes Wide Open" channeled their debut's brighter material, specially "Used for Glue". "Choose Your Adventure" incorporates synthesizers and an organ; it, alongside "The Ghost Is Out There", channeled the heavy sound of Quicksand. The orchestral ballad "Racing to Red Lights" occasionally had sparse, slower instrumentation; the intro to it was reminiscent of the Stratford 4's The Revolt Against Tired Noises (2002).

Following track "Shot After Shot" was a combination of hardcore punk and shoegaze; it, along with "Big Waves" were new versions of tracks from their scrapped second album. The main guitar riff and verse music evolved from those sessions, while "Big Waves" retained its structure and arrangement. Both tracks were credited to the band and Traynor. "Small Doses", a Smiths-indebted track, featured Schreifels crooning and shared a thematic similarity with "Institutionalized" by Suicidal Tendencies. He said it was about having a break from other people.

== Release ==
The album was delayed due to the group being in discussions with various labels, such as Vagrant Records. In March 2010, the band signed with Photo Finish Records, who had a distribution deal with major label Atlantic Records; the new record was expected for release later in the year. Siegler, who acted as the band's manager, said they were attracted to them due to their social-networking skills and that several of the people who worked with the band at Island Records during United by Fate now worked at Photo Finish. Following this, Schreifels embarked on a solo UK tour in March and April, leading up to the release of his solo album An Open Letter to the Scene in May. "Shot After Shot" premiered on BBC Radio 1 on September 30. In October, the band played a few US shows with the Gaslight Anthem.

"Shot After Shot" was released as a single on November 14, and was promoted with a one-off UK show two days later. On February 17, 2011, an outtake from the sessions, "You Should Have Hung Out", was made available for streaming. On February 22, "Wring It Out" premiered through Spinner. Pedals was made available for streaming on March 1. The following day, a music video was released for "Wring It Out", directed by Jordan Galland. It was influenced by an exorcist and features Jemima Kirke as a possessed girl. The track was released as a single on March 6. Pedals was released on March 8; its artwork was a painting of poppies that was done by Alex Brown. The following month, the group went on a co-headlining UK tour with ...And You Will Know Us by the Trail of Dead. "Wring It Out" and "Choose Your Adventure" were released on a 7" vinyl single as part of Record Store Day.

An Ad-Rock remix of "69 Guns" premiered through Spin on April 25, 2011. It came about due to the friendship between Siegler and Ad-Rock; it was done in February 2010. In May 2011, the band went on a brief west coast tour. On August 5, a music video was released for "Eyes Wide Open", which featured references to Repulsion (1965). A promotional CD featured "Racing to Red Lights", a Daryl Palumbo (of Glassjaw) remix of "Choose Your Adventure", and acoustic versions of "Wring It Out" and "Small Doses". Later in the month, the band performed at Lollapalooza in the US, and at a one-off UK show. On September 28, it was announced that Love had left the band a second time. In October, the group embarked on a headlining US tour with support from Balance and Composure and Hostage Calm. In June 2012, the group appeared at the North by Northeast showcase. In September, the band played a few shows in Australia, with support from Toy Boats.

== Reception ==
Professional ratings
Review scores
Source	Rating
AllMusic	4/5 stars
The A.V. Club	B
Clash	7/10
Consequence of Sound	2.5/5 stars
Drowned in Sound	5/10
NME	6/10
PopMatters	9/10
Rock Sound	8/10
The Skinny	2/5 stars
Spin	7/10 stars

Several reviewers generally praised the songwriting. AllMusic reviewer Gregory Heaney wrote that "time away has certainly been a blessing" for Rival Schools as the album "paints a picture of a band that has done a lot of growing up over the last ten years, replacing the fury and uncertainty of its benchmark debut with a slicker, self-assured sound". NME writer Hardeep Phull said the band returned from their break to "demonstrate why they’re such luminaries for today’s post-hardcore hordes", adding that Schreifels "has retained his ear for a good tune". Rock Sound's Chris Hidden was similarly concerned, but "any fears of being letdown by the long (and we mean long!) awaited follow-up ‘Pedals’ are instantly evaporated by ‘Wring it Out'". PopMatters contributor Ian Mathers felt that it "fully justifies that decade I’ve spent hoping for it, even if it’s different enough from United By Fate", mentioning that it was "both more compact and expansive than the debut, with arguably better melodies". Doug Brod of Spin wrote that while it did not have the "brash, anthemic crunch" of United by Fate, it "does display the same knack for twisty, melodic tunes girded by knotty guitars and Schreifels’ likably straining vocals". Coplan agreed, saying that it had "more pleasing tracks [that] offer a larger, more anthemic sound".

Some critics commented on Schreifels' voice. Clash writer Reef Younis said Pedals was "instantly recognisable with Walter Schreifels’ sinewy vocal at the forefront of choppy guitar dynamics and familiarly comforting post-punk melodies," highlighting "Shot After Shot". Katia Ganfield of The Line of Best Fit thought Schreifels "sounds exactly the same as he did almost ten years ago, grungy growls that grow into something endearing when reaching those high notes". Consequence of Sound's Chris Coplan wrote that it offered "some of the more refined vocals (read, less gravelly) by Schreifels"; BBC Music reviewer Chris Beanland noted that Schreifels "still has that customary growl. On Racing to Red Lights it still sounds like he's swallowed a cheese grater". Drowned in Sound writer Thom Gibbs, meanwhile, said there was "something jarring about Schreifels' vocal phrasing which seems to leave him permanently dawdling behind the rhythm of the band".

Others were mixed on the writing; The A.V. Club writer Jason Heller noted that while it followed the emo sound of United by Fate but "doesn’t squeeze as much from the formula" for Pedals. He added that "much of the album coasts on moody spaciousness". Gibbs wrote that it had "more instrumental variety" than United by Fate, "which helps stave off monotony, but the band have unsurprisingly lost the urgency which one made them alluring". Ganfield wrote that it "clearly lacks the heaviness and potent distortion of United By Fate, yet this shouldn’t be something viewed as an immediate disadvantage". The Skinny writer Darren Carle wrote that the band's break had no impact on pushing their "sound out of the pre-packaged, hardcore-stepping stone that United By Fate was. In fact, Pedals sounds more neutered, with an extra layer of plastic packaging that stops your fingers from really feeling what’s underneath the safe production".

ABC News included it at number 50 of their top 50 albums of 2011.

== Track listing ==
All songs by Rival Schools, except where noted.

No.	Title	Writer(s)	Length
1.	"Wring It Out"		3:28
2.	"69 Guns"		3:22
3.	"Eyes Wide Open"		3:00
4.	"Choose Your Adventure"		3:25
5.	"Racing to Red Lights"		4:03
6.	"Shot After Shot"	Rival Schools, Chris Traynor	3:14
7.	"A Parts for B Actors"		3:38
8.	"Big Waves"	Rival Schools, Traynor	2:59
9.	"Small Doses"		3:59
10.	"The Ghost Is Out There"		3:20
Total length:			34:28

Deluxe Version
No.	Title	Length
11.	"You Should Have Hung Out"	3:30
12.	"Arranged Marriages"	3:32
13.	"Paranoid Detectives"	3:28

== Personnel ==
Personnel per booklet.

Rival Schools

- Ian Love – guitar
- Walter Schreifels – vocals, guitar, piano
- Sammy Siegler – drums
- Cache Tolman – bass

Production

- Rival Schools – producer
- Ian Love – recording, mixing (tracks 1 and 10)
- Joel Hamilton – additional tracking, mixing (tracks 4, 5 and 7–9)
- Francisco Botero – assistance
- Chris Sheldon – mixing (tracks 2, 3 and 6)
- Will Quinnell – mastering
- Alex Brown – cover painting, line drawings
- Ayumu Meoto – Rival Schools font
- Anthony Pappalardo – layouts, design
- Jacqueline Cheng – art management
- Walter Schreifels – inlay photograph
