= Good Things (Rival Schools song) =

Single by Rival Schools

from the album United by Fate
- Released: July 8, 2002
- Genre: Alternative rock; indie rock
- Length: 3:43
- Label: Island
- Songwriter(s): Walter Schreifels; Cache Tolman; Sam Siegler; Ian Love
- Producer(s): Luke Ebbin

Rival Schools singles chronology
"Used for Glue" (2002)	"Good Things" (2002)	"Shot After Shot" (2010)

Music video
- "Good Things" on YouTube

"Good Things" is a song by American post-hardcore band Rival Schools. The song was released as the second and final single from the band's debut studio album United by Fate. The song peaked at no. 74 on the UK Singles Chart.

== Track listing ==
CD single

No.	Title	Length
1.	"Good Things" (Album Version)	3:43
2.	"Used for Glue" (Steve Lamacq Session)	3:31
3.	"Good Things" (Steve Lamacq Session)	3:36

Enhanced CD single

No.	Title	Length
1.	"Good Things" (Album Version)	3:45
2.	"High Acetate" (Steve Lamacq Session)	2:24
3.	"Undercovers On" (Steve Lamacq Session)	6:26
4.	"Good Things" (Music Video)	3:43

== Charts ==
Chart (2002)	Peak position
UK Singles Chart	74

== Personnel ==
- Walter Schreifels – lead vocals, guitar
- Ian Love – guitar, backing vocals
- Cache Tolman – bass
- Sammy Siegler – drums
