= United by Fate =

2001 album by Rival Schools

Studio album by Rival Schools
- Released: September 4, 2001
- Recorded: 2001
- Studios: Bearsville; Chung King; Avatar; The Village Recorder
- Genres: Alternative rock; post-hardcore; emo
- Length: 41:38
- Label: Island
- Producer: Luke Ebbin

Rival Schools chronology
Rival Schools United by Onelinedrawing (2001)	United by Fate (2001)	Pedals (2011)

Singles from United by Fate
- 1. "Used for Glue" Released: March 18, 2002; 2. "Travel by Telephone" Released: May 21, 2002; 3. "Good Things" Released: July 8, 2002

United by Fate is the debut album by American rock band Rival Schools. The album was produced by Grammy Award–winning producer Luke Ebbin. It was the only album the band created during its initial run.

== Background and recording ==
Guitarist Walter Schreifels, formerly of Gorilla Biscuits, formed Quicksand in 1990; the band would later become influential in the post-hardcore genre. He released two albums with the group—Slip (1992) and Manic Compression (1995)—before they broke up. He spent time working on CIV's debut album Set Your Goals (1995), before reuniting Quicksand in 1997, until disbanding again in 1999. Despite his peers being dropped from their respective major labels following a merger with Universal, Island Records retained Schreifels and gave him time to form a new band. Rival Schools was born out of an informal jam session with drummer Sam Siegler (formerly of Gorilla Biscuits and Youth of Today) and bassist Cache Tolman (formerly of Iceburn and CIV). They spent several months working on material and recording demos, before adding guitarist Ian Love (formerly of Burn and Die 116). Love had previously worked with Schreifels on early Quicksand demos.

Love owned a Pro Tools studio, which aided in the group's development. They visited the UK to play their first show in February 2000; Schreifels subsequently spent time managing his record label Some Records, which he would mainly use to release albums from his friends in New York. The band went on a three-week European tour in December of the same year. United by Fate was recorded with producer Luke Ebbin, mainly at Bearsville Studios in upstate New York. Further recording was at Chung King Studios, Avatar Studios and The Village Recorder. Gary Tole, who engineered the sessions, ran Pro Tools, which was edited by Graham Hawthorne. They were assisted by Jeremy Mitchell, Bill Synon, Ross Petersen and Matt Marrin. Rich Costey mixed the recordings at Village Recorder, before Steve Marcussen mastered them at Marcussen Mastering in Los Angeles.

== Composition ==
United by Fate is an alternative rock, emo and post-hardcore record, which drew comparisons to Quicksand, Hundred Reasons, Foo Fighters, Burning Airlines, Mission of Burma, Wheat and Built to Spill. Schreifels' vocals earned a comparison to Nirvana frontman Kurt Cobain and Bush vocalist Gavin Rossdale. Schreifels would write the main idea of a song and arrange the rest of it with the other members; this was a shift from Quicksand, which had Schreifels writing everything by himself. The album's title has its origin with the band's name: Schreifels went past a shop with the video game Rival Schools: United by Fate in its window, "[b]ut since we didn't want to get into trouble with the game's producers, we ended up calling the album "United By Fate"." He was initially unaware of the game's popularity in the US, and had issues with its publisher Capcom.

The opening track "Travel by Telephone" begins with a metal-esque guitar riff, and recalled Fugazi. The bass guitar-driven "Everything Has Its Point" is followed by the pop rock track "High Acetate" evoked the group's New York hardcore roots and Nirvana. The main riff is played through delay and wah pedals. The slow-burning number "Undercovers On" is followed by the post-grunge track "Good Things". "Used for Glue" talks about using people and is one of the heavier-sounding tracks on the record. It initially starts with a quiet guitar part and hi-hat crashes before the full-band comes in; the heavy tone earned a comparison to Queens of the Stone Age.

"The Switch" channeled the sound of the members' previous bands. It tells the story of two people who are being chased, and if they are caught, they will be killed. "Holding Sand" was most reminiscent of Quicksand, and samples the drum beat from "Soon" by My Bloody Valentine. "My Echo" is a less-than-two minute track that uses a surf rock rhythm guitar sound: a descending chord progression and eighth note strumming in the pre-chorus. A breakdown with drum fills follows, before a guitar solo is heard. The Foo Fighters-indebted pop rock number "So Down On" is followed by the instrumental closing track "Hooligans for Life", which ends with noise rock breakdowns. Schreifels said the song was intended as a parody of 1960s pop/rock groups such as the Who and Small Faces. Siegler said the title was about "being youthful for life, young till I die, whatever."

== Release ==
In June, the group toured North America, prior to the release of a split EP with Onelinedrawing in July. They then embarked on a six-week stint from August with Burning Airlines. Originally scheduled for release in late July, and pushed back to mid-August, United by Fate was eventually released on September 4 through Island Records. The CD label featured a tomato dog toy that was owned by Love. To aid in promotion, the label gave away a sampler that featured two of the album's tracks, combined with two outtakes, with purchases of a Weezer single. Alongside this, the label provided music websites a music player that included streams of some of the record's songs with live videos and photos. Following the album's release, the group went on a December US tour.

In January 2002, the band went on a US tour with Burning Brides, Solea, and Taking Back Sunday, followed by a European tour in February and March. "Used for Glue" was released as a single on March 18, 2002; the song's music video was directed by Marcos Siega. The UK CD featured "Bells", "On Vacation" and the music video for "Used for Glue", while the European CD swapped the video for "Grunge Model". The 7" vinyl version included "The Sweet" as the B-side. "Travel by Telephone" was released as a single on May 21. In June, the band went on another European tour where they played various festivals, leading up to an appearance at the Glastonbury Festival. Following this, they embarked on a UK tour, which included performances at the Move, Distortion, and Reading and Leeds Festivals.

To coincide with this, "Good Things" was released as a single on July 8. Two CD versions were release: one featuring Steve Lamacq radio sessions versions of "High Acetate" and "Undercovers On" with the music video for "Good Things", while the other featured Lamacq session versions of "Used for Glue" and "Good Things". On December 13, Love announced his departure from the group, choosing to focus on his side project Cardia. On January 12, 2003, Chris Traynor of Bush was announced as their new guitarist. In 2013, United by Fate was re-pressed on vinyl through independent label SRC Vinyl. It featured the bonus tracks "Sweet", "Get Centered", "Grunge Model", "Accept A Compliment" and "On Vacations". Coinciding with its November 2013 release, the band supported Jimmy Eat World on their European tour.

== Reception ==
Professional ratings
Review scores
Source	Rating
AllMusic	4.5/5 stars
Blender	2/5 stars
Drowned in Sound	8/10
In Music We Trust	A+
Kerrang!	4/5 stars
Pitchfork	6.3/10
Punknews.org	4/5 stars
Rock Hard	8/10
Rolling Stone	3/5 stars

Many of the reviewers praised the album's strong songwriting. AllMusic reviewer Peter J. D'Angelo wrote that it "actually lives up to the expectations raised by their pedigree", though felt it was "tamer material than the past projects of Rival School's members". BBC Music's Jack Smith wrote that "My Echo" exemplified the album's best moments: "infectious hooks, dont-overstay-your-welcome brevity and a trace of off-kilterness". Raziq Rauf of Drowned in Sound thought that the band were "very good and it is safe to say that they take their influences from nobody but themselves". LAS Magazine's Ryan Allen found it "high concentration on hooks and might. The record is bombastic as all get out" as it "never really takes it foot off the gas, barreling into curves and sort of doing so without much shame, which is definitely respectable". Punknews.org staff member Hein Terweduwe was surprised that "these guys have a lot of maturity to show in this effort", calling the writing "complex and intelligent song-building". Rock Hard reviewer Marcus Schleutermann felt that it "shines with extremely exciting, atmospheric songs. Thanks to the extremely powerful rhythm section, the band never runs the risk of drifting into tearful realms, but always rocks up properly".

Other critics were mixed on the songwriting. Rob Kemp of Rolling Stone said that Rival Schools "work up a mighty head of steam on United by Fate, joining the thunder of Jawbox to the anxious tunefulness of the Who". The A.V. Club writer Josh Modell said that "perhaps by top-loading his new group's album with familiar sounds and structures, Schreifels hopes to reintroduce himself to the public", given the six-year gap since the last Quicksand album. He added that the majority of it "suffers because it tries to break the post-hardcore mold and take deliberate steps into other arenas". Blender's John Harris said that despite the band "try[ing] as they might, their brand of dejected, pummeling misery-rock can’t help but seem way out of time" with their contemporaries. Pitchfork contributor Adam Dlugacz lambasted the album, saying that Schreifels' "third hurrah amounts to a bunch of ex-hardcore heroes who have-- surprise!-- not aged gracefully. And the music? Neither groundbreaking, nor even 'really good.'"

"Used for Glue" and "Good Things" were released as singles, which charted at #42 and #74, respectively, on the UK Singles Chart. By March 2011, it had sold 38,000 copies in the US. It has since been seen as a landmark for the post-hardcore genre and become a cult classic. United by Fate has appeared on best-of emo album lists by Drowned in Sound and NME. Similarly, Drowned in Sound included it at number 44 on their list of the best albums released in that publication's lifetime. Kerrang! featured the album on their "666 Albums You Must Hear Before You Die!" list. In April 2019, Rock Sound ranked the album at number 188 on its list of the "250 Greatest Albums of Our Lifetime", compiling the best albums released sine the publication's launch in 1999. Alternative Press ranked "Used for Glue" at number 95 on their list of the best 100 singles from the 2000s.

== Track listing ==
All music by Rival Schools, all lyrics by Walter Schreifels.

No.	Title	Length
1.	"Travel by Telephone"	2:47
2.	"Everything Has Its Point"	3:21
3.	"High Acetate"	1:53
4.	"Undercovers On"	5:30
5.	"Good Things"	3:43
6.	"Used for Glue"	3:18
7.	"World Invitational"	3:35
8.	"The Switch"	3:04
9.	"Holding Sand"	3:43
10.	"My Echo"	1:59
11.	"Favorite Star"	2:58
12.	"So Down On"	3:19
13.	"Hooligans for Life"	2:28
Total length:		41:38

Vinyl Bonus Tracks (2001 Pressing)
No.	Title	Length
14.	"Sweet"	3:37

Vinyl Bonus Tracks (2013 Pressing)
No.	Title	Length
14.	"Sweet"	3:37
15.	"Get Centered"	5:34
16.	"Grunge Model"	3:27
17.	"Accept A Compliment"	3:30
18.	"On Vacations"	3:26

Japan Bonus Tracks
No.	Title	Length
14.	"Bells"	3:29
15.	"Grunge Model"	3:27

UK Bonus Tracks
No.	Title	Length
14.	"Grunge Model"	3:27

"Sweet" is the b-side of the "Used For Glue" single, but only on the vinyl version. The song is titled "The Sweet" on the original single, possibly incorrectly. It has never been released digitally outside of appearing on an Australian compilation titled "Soundwave 09" in 2008.

"Get Centered" was previously only available through a sample CD that the band handed out on their 2001 tour, prior to the release of United by Fate. The song is titled "Get Center" on that release, possibly incorrectly.

"Grunge Model" also originates from the aforementioned promotional CD. It was re-released as one of the b-sides of "Used For Glue" in 2002.

"Accept A Compliment" was previously unreleased, although a song by the band titled "Accept The Compliment (Demo)" appeared on promotional CD for 2000's Warped Tour. It is unclear if this is the same version found on the vinyl record.

"On Vacations" is also a "Used For Glue" b-side, under the title, "On Vacation".

"Bells" can be found on the Japanese version of the album and as the final b-side for "Used For Glue".

== Personnel ==
Personnel per booklet.

Rival Schools

- Walter Schreifels – vocals, guitar
- Cache Tolman – bass
- Ian Love – guitar
- Sammy Siegler – drums

Production

- Luke Ebbin – producer
- Gary Tole – engineer, Pro Tools
- Rich Costey – mixing
- Graham Hawthorne – Pro Tools editing
- Jeremy Mitchell – assistant
- Bill Synon – assistant
- Ross Petersen – assistant
- Matt Marrin – assistant
- Steve Marcussen – mastering
- Frank Gargiulo – art direction, design
- Rick Patrick – creative direction
- Terry Richardson – photography
- Dominic Greensmith – cover jogger photograph
