= Leathers (Deftones song) =

Single by Deftones

from the album Koi No Yokan
- B-side: "Rosemary"
- Released: September 19, 2012
- Recorded: 2012
- Genre: Alternative metal; art rock
- Length: 4:08
- Label: Reprise
- Composers: Stephen Carpenter, Abe Cunningham, Chino Moreno, Frank Delgado, Sergio Vega
- Lyricist: Chino Moreno
- Producer: Nick Raskulinecz

Deftones singles chronology
"You've Seen the Butcher" (2010)	"Leathers" (2012)	"Tempest" (2012)

Cassette cover

"Leathers" is the first single from the American alternative metal band Deftones' seventh album, Koi No Yokan, and their 17th single overall. The song was made available on September 19, 2012 for free download on the band's official website, before being released as a digital download on iTunes. It was also the first Koi No Yokan track to be made public, almost two months before the album was officially released.

Deftones also issued the song as a cassette single, featuring album track "Rosemary" as a B-side, during the promotional North American tour of October–November 2012. The cassette single was available at the merchandise stand to the first 50 fans at each stop of the tour who preordered Koi No Yokan.

In 2012, Loudwire ranked the song number six on their list of the 10 greatest Deftones songs, number two in 10 Best Rock Songs Of 2012 and in 2020, Kerrang ranked the song number nine on their list of the 20 greatest Deftones songs.

== Track listing ==
iTunes single
No.	Title	Length
1.	"Leathers"	4:13

Cassette single
No.	Title	Length
1.	"Leathers"	4:08
2.	"Rosemary"	6:53

== Personnel ==
- Abe Cunningham − drums
- Stephen Carpenter − guitar
- Frank Delgado − samples, keyboards
- Chino Moreno − vocals, guitar
- Sergio Vega − bass

Technical personnel

- Nick Raskulinecz − production
