= Used for Glue =

2001 single by Rival Schools

Single by Rival Schools

from the album United by Fate
- B-side: "The Sweet"
- Released: March 18, 2002
- Genre: Alternative rock; emo; post-hardcore
- Length: 3:18
- Label: Island
- Songwriter(s): Walter Schreifels; Cache Tolman; Sam Siegler; Ian Love
- Producer(s): Luke Ebbin

Rival Schools singles chronology
| "Used for Glue" (2002) | "Good Things" (2002) |

"Used for Glue" is a song by American post-hardcore band Rival Schools. The song was released as the first single from the band's debut album United by Fate. The song peaked at no. 42 on the UK Singles Chart in late March 2002.

== Music video ==
A music video was released for the song and shows the band performing the song at a house party. The main narrative of the video focuses on two party goers who become romantically interested in one another.

== Track listing ==
CD single

| No. | Title | Length |
|---|---|---|
| 1. | "Used for Glue" | 3:18 |
| 2. | "Bells" | 2:42 |
| 3. | "On Vacation" | 3:26 |
| 4. | "Grunge Model" | 3:24 |

Enhanced CD single

| No. | Title | Length |
|---|---|---|
| 1. | "Used for Glue" | 3:18 |
| 2. | "Bells" | 2:42 |
| 3. | "On Vacation" | 3:26 |
| 4. | "Used for Glue" (Music Video) | 3:25 |

7" single

| No. | Title | Length |
|---|---|---|
| 1. | "Used for Glue" | 3:18 |
| 2. | "The Sweet" | 3:37 |

== Charts ==
| Chart (2002) | Peak position |
|---|---|
| UK Singles Chart | 42 |

== Personnel ==
- Walter Schreifels – lead vocals, guitar
- Ian Love – guitar, backing vocals
- Cache Tolman – bass
- Sammy Siegler – drums
