= Swerve City =

Single by Deftones

from the album Koi No Yokan
- Released: March 2013
- Genre: Groove metal; dream pop
- Length: 2:44
- Label: Reprise
- Composers: Stephen Carpenter; Abe Cunningham; Chino Moreno; Frank Delgado; Sergio Vega
- Lyricist: Chino Moreno
- Producer: Nick Raskulinecz

Deftones singles chronology
"Tempest" (2012)	"Swerve City" (2013)	"Romantic Dreams" (2013)

Music video
- "Swerve City" on YouTube

"Swerve City" is a song by American alternative metal band Deftones. It is the opening track on their seventh studio album, Koi No Yokan (2012), and was released as a single in March 2013, where it peaked at No. 6 on Billboard's Mainstream Rock.

== Music video ==
The first music video for "Swerve City", directed by Gus Black, was released on May 9, 2013. It shows a woman (Tamara Feldman) in the desert riding a horse to her home (a ranch bungalow). While brushing her horse outside the bungalow, Chino Moreno is seen heading towards her home in a Porsche Panamera. The woman notices the car headlights as Moreno arrives outside the home. Subsequently, she walks outside and pulls out a pistol.

A second music video was released on July 2, 2013, directed by Ryan Mackfall. This performance video featured tour footage of the band.

== Track listing ==
Promotional CD single
No.	Title	Length
1.	"Swerve City"	2:44

== Personnel ==
Deftones

- Chino Moreno – vocals, guitar
- Stephen Carpenter – guitar
- Abe Cunningham – drums
- Frank Delgado – keyboards, samples, turntables
- Sergio Vega – bass guitar

Production

- Nick Raskulinecz – producer
