= Distant Populations =

Studio album by Quicksand
- Released: August 13, 2021
- Studio: Studio 4, Conshohocken, Pennsylvania
- Genres: Post-hardcore, alternative metal, hard rock, alternative rock
- Length: 32:27
- Label: Epitaph
- Producer: Will Yip

Quicksand chronology
Triptych Continuum (2018)	Distant Populations (2021)	Split (2024)

Singles from Distant Populations
- 1. "Inversion" Released: April 13, 2021; 2. "Missile Command" Released: June 23, 2021

Professional ratings
Review scores
Source	Rating
Distorted Sound	8/10
Kerrang!	4/5
Paste	6.7/10
PopMatters	7/10
Punknews.org	3/5 stars

Distant Populations is the fourth studio album by American post-hardcore band Quicksand. The album was released digitally on August 13, 2021, through Epitaph Records.

== Background ==
The band's previous studio album, Interiors, was released on November 10, 2017, and was the band's first release since 1995's Manic Compression. In 2018, Quicksand released an EP titled Triptych Continuum on 12-inch vinyl for Record Store Day.

On April 13, 2021, the band released the single "Inversion", but did not announce a new album at the time. On June 23, the band released another single, "Missile Command", and announced a new album, Distant Populations, set to be released digitally on August 13 with a vinyl edition following on September 24.

== Musical style ==
Distant Populations has been described as post-hardcore, alternative metal, hard rock and alternative rock.

== Track listing ==
All tracks are written by Quicksand.

Distant Populations track listing
No.	Title	Length
1.	"Inversion"	2:38
2.	"Lightning Field"	2:23
3.	"Colossus"	3:18
4.	"Brushed"	3:35
5.	"Katakana"	2:35
6.	"Missile Command"	3:24
7.	"Phase 90"	3:34
8.	"The Philosopher"	3:28
9.	"Compacted Reality" (Instrumental)	1:10
10.	"EMDR"	2:59
11.	"Rodan"	3:23

== Personnel ==
Quicksand

- Walter Schreifels – vocals, guitar
- Sergio Vega – bass
- Alan Cage – drums

Production

- Will Yip – engineer, producer
- Ted Jensen – mastering
- Josh Wilbur – mixing
- Tetsunori Tawaraya – artwork
- Jason Link – layout

== Charts ==
Chart performance for Distant Populations
Chart (2021)	Peak position
Belgian Albums (Ultratop Wallonia)	167
German Albums (Offizielle Top 100)	36
Scottish Albums (Official Charts)	94
UK Rock & Metal Albums (Official Charts)	15
UK Independent Albums (Official Charts)	38
