= Tempest (Deftones song) =

Single by Deftones

from the album Koi No Yokan
- Released: October 9, 2012
- Recorded: 2012
- Genre: Post-metal; progressive rock
- Length: 6:05
- Label: Reprise
- Composers: Stephen Carpenter; Abe Cunningham; Chino Moreno; Frank Delgado; Sergio Vega
- Lyricist: Chino Moreno
- Producer: Nick Raskulinecz

Deftones singles chronology
"Leathers" (2012)	"Tempest" (2012)	"Swerve City" (2013)

"Tempest" is a song by American alternative metal band Deftones, released as the second single from their seventh album, Koi No Yokan. The song debuted on PureVolume's official website on October 3, 2012 along with a video featuring band members Chino Moreno and Sergio Vega giving some insight regarding the track. Its lyrical content is representative of the supposed end of the world that would have occurred on December 21, 2012, according to various myths related to the Mayan calendar.

Peaking at No. 3 on the US Hot Mainstream Rock Tracks, Tempest became Deftones' most successful single on that chart, surpassing "Change (In the House of Flies)", which peaked at No. 9 in 2001.

It was placed at No. 2 in Consequence's article "The Top 20 Deftones Songs", with the song described as containing "[e]xpansive textures, Shakespearian lyrics, and multiple all-time-great riffs rolled into one banger".

== Track listing ==
iTunes single
No.	Title	Length
1.	"Tempest"	6:05

Promo CD single
No.	Title	Length
1.	"Tempest (Radio Edit)"	4:31

== Personnel ==
Deftones

- Chino Moreno − vocals, guitar
- Stephen Carpenter − guitar
- Abe Cunningham − drums
- Frank Delgado − keyboards, samples, turntables
- Sergio Vega − bass

Production

- Nick Raskulinecz − producer

== Charts ==
=== Weekly charts ===
Weekly chart performance for "Tempest"
Chart (2012–2013)	Peak position
Canada Rock (Billboard)	24
US Hot Rock & Alternative Songs (Billboard)	45
US Rock & Alternative Airplay (Billboard)	13

=== Year-end charts ===
Year-end chart performance for "Tempest"
Chart (2013)	Position
US Rock Airplay (Billboard)	43
