= Ebbin =

Ebbin is a surname. Notable people with the surname include:

- Adam Ebbin (born 1963), American politician
- Luke Ebbin, American record producer, composer, and songwriter
