= Koi No Yokan =

Studio album by Deftones
- Released: November 12, 2012
- Recorded: July–August 2012
- Studios: Paramount (Los Angeles); Ameraycan (Hollywood); Encore (Hollywood)
- Genres: Alternative metal; alternative rock
- Length: 51:50
- Label: Reprise
- Producer: Nick Raskulinecz

Deftones chronology
Covers (2011)	Koi No Yokan (2012)	Gore (2016)

Singles from Koi No Yokan
- 1. "Leathers" Released: September 19, 2012; 2. "Tempest" Released: October 9, 2012; 3. "Swerve City" Released: March 2013; 4. "Romantic Dreams" Released: September 25, 2013

Koi No Yokan is the seventh studio album by the American alternative metal band Deftones. It was released on November 12, 2012 by Reprise Records, and was produced by Nick Raskulinecz, which was the last album to be produced by him until Private Music (2025). Its title is a phrase from the Japanese language "恋の予感", translating to "premonition of love". The album was met with widespread acclaim from critics upon its release, and sold an estimated 65,000 copies in the first week. The album debuted at No. 11 on Billboard 200, and placed No. 5 on the Top Rock Albums. According to Nielsen Soundscan, the album has sold 350,000 copies in the US as of July 2025.

== Background ==
Band frontman Chino Moreno characterized the album as "dynamic" with a full range of noise, noting an increased contribution of ideas by bassist Sergio Vega compared to their previous record, Diamond Eyes. A major change in the recording process came with the use of the Fractal Audio Systems Axe-Fx preamp/effects processor, which creates the sound of multiple outboard amps and pedals and allowed for different tones. Vega claimed that the band was able to "bring Fractal into hotel rooms and run it into software and record ideas and flesh them out later". The group tracked guitar, bass and vocals, then recorded drums and replaced the guitar, bass and vocals. Vega confirmed that "everything was organic".

Described as having an "alternative metal vibe" by Loudwire, the music incorporates experimental elements from the band's previous albums Saturday Night Wrist (2006) and Diamond Eyes (2010), incorporating elements from metal (including doom metal and groove metal), alternative rock, shoegaze, dream pop, hardcore punk, post-rock, and progressive rock.

== Release ==
The band announced the album as well as a tour for the album on August 30, 2012. On September 19, 2012, the band released the song Leathers as a promotional single via a free download on their website. Leathers was released as the album's first single on October 8, 2012. It was also released as a limited-edition cassingle with Rosemary on the B-side. On October 3, 2012, the song Tempest premiered on PureVolume for streaming. Tempest was released as a single on October 9, 2012.

Koi No Yokan was released on vinyl in four versions: a standard retail version pressed on 140-gram black vinyl (3,000 units), a direct-to-consumer version on 180-gram black vinyl with foil-stamped numbered jackets (1,000 units), an international edition pressed on 180-gram vinyl and an exclusive edition sold through Hot Topic retailers pressed on 140-gram clear-colored vinyl (1,500 units).

The band launched a tour on October 9, 2012, which ended on November 21 in Los Angeles. Before the album was released, the band played at venues with seating capacity between 1,000-4,000 to allow fans to hear the music early.

The album cover features a photograph by Futura, who had previously discussed designing an album cover with the band.

== Critical reception ==
Professional ratings
Aggregate scores
Source	Rating
AnyDecentMusic?	8.1/10
Metacritic	86/100
Review scores
Source	Rating
AllMusic	4/5 stars
Drowned in Sound	9/10
Entertainment Weekly	B+
Kerrang!	5/5
Loudwire	4.5/5 stars
NME	8/10
PopMatters	9/10
Slant Magazine	4/5 stars
Spin	7/10
Sputnikmusic	4.4/5

According to the review aggregator Metacritic, Koi No Yokan received "universal acclaim" based on a weighted average score of 86 out of 100 from 18 critic scores. With this score, Koi No Yokan was among the eight best-reviewed albums of 2012. Gregory Heaney of AllMusic wrote, "While a lot of bands out there have been tinkering with the loud/quiet dynamic for decades now, what makes Deftones so special is their ability to do both at the same time, effectively blending the calm and the storm into a single sound". Mischa Pearlman of BBC Music wrote, "It transcends the boundaries and expectations of its genre--even those previously set by the very band that made it". Al Horner of NME said of the album, "It's a shotgun blast of cranked guitars, bruising hardcore and canyon-sized choruses, and it's mesmerising". Greg Fisher of Sputnikmusic called it "a remarkably consistent effort" that "glitters with supreme melodies as much as crushes with massive riffs showcasing the quintet's most accomplished material in over a decade". Rolling Stone called the album "adventurously aggressive" and stated, "Koi No Yokan ranges from brutal, blunt-force trauma (in reference to Gauze) to epic prog-rock atmospherics (in reference to "the sprawling, enchanting Tempest"). Opener Swerve City sets the tone immediately with a bludgeoning riff, but Deftones also take nuanced approaches to angsty tension, weaving meticulously crafted cosmic rock on Entombed and wading through murky, jagged textures on Rosemary".

In May 2013, Revolver named Koi No Yokan as the Album of the Year at the fifth annual Revolver Golden Gods Award Show. In 2024, Loudwire staff elected it as the best hard rock album of 2012.

== Track listing ==
All lyrics are written by Chino Moreno; all music is composed by Deftones (Stephen Carpenter, Abe Cunningham, Frank Delgado, Chino Moreno, Sergio Vega).

No.	Title	Length
1.	"Swerve City"	2:44
2.	"Romantic Dreams"	4:38
3.	"Leathers"	4:08
4.	"Poltergeist"	3:31
5.	"Entombed"	4:59
6.	"Graphic Nature"	4:32
7.	"Tempest"	6:05
8.	"Gauze"	4:41
9.	"Rosemary"	6:53
10.	"Goon Squad"	5:40
11.	"What Happened to You?"	3:53
Total length:		51:50

== Personnel ==
From the CD liner notes.

Deftones

- Abe Cunningham − drums
- Stephen Carpenter − guitar
- Frank Delgado − keyboards, samples
- Chino Moreno − vocals, guitar
- Sergio Vega (Note: Despite being credited as a member in the liner notes, Vega disputes his status as a full time member of the band, claiming that he was a member of the band only under contract.) − bass

Technical

- Nick Raskulinecz − production
- Matt Hyde − additional production, recording, engineering
- Steve Olmon − recording and engineering assistance
- Rich Costey − mixing
- Chris Kasych − Pro Tools mix engineering
- Eric Isip − assistant mixing engineer
- Ted Jensen − mastering
- Frank Maddocks − art direction, package design
- Futura − photography
- 13th Witness − band photograph

== Charts ==
=== Weekly charts ===
Weekly chart performance for Koi No Yokan
Chart (2012–13)	Peak position
Australian Albums (ARIA)	16
Austrian Albums (Ö3 Austria)	25
Belgian Albums (Ultratop Flanders)	51
Belgian Albums (Ultratop Wallonia)	32
Canadian Albums (Billboard)	13
Danish Albums (Hitlisten)	24
Dutch Albums (Album Top 100)	28
Finnish Albums (Suomen virallinen lista)	35
French Albums (SNEP)	30
German Albums (Offizielle Top 100)	17
Hungarian Albums (MAHASZ)	40
Irish Albums (IRMA)	49
Italian Albums (FIMI)	60
New Zealand Albums (RMNZ)	8
Norwegian Albums (VG-lista)	34
Scottish Albums (Official Charts)	28
Spanish Albums (Promusicae)	60
Swiss Albums (Schweizer Hitparade)	22
UK Albums (Official Charts)	30
UK Rock & Metal Albums (OCC)	3
US Billboard 200	11
US Top Rock Albums (Billboard)	5
US Top Alternative Albums (Billboard)	5
US Top Hard Rock Albums (Billboard)	2

Chart (2025)	Peak position
Greek Albums (IFPI)	22

=== Year-end charts ===
Year-end chart performance for Koi No Yokan
Chart (2013)	Position
US Billboard 200	174
US Top Rock Albums (Billboard)	44
US Top Hard Rock Albums (Billboard)	11

== Certifications ==
Certifications for Koi No Yokan
Region	Certification	Certified units/sales
New Zealand (RMNZ)	Gold	7,500^{‡}
United Kingdom (BPI)	Silver	60,000^{‡}
^{‡} Sales+streaming figures based on certification alone.
