= Cassette single =

Cassette tape release of music single

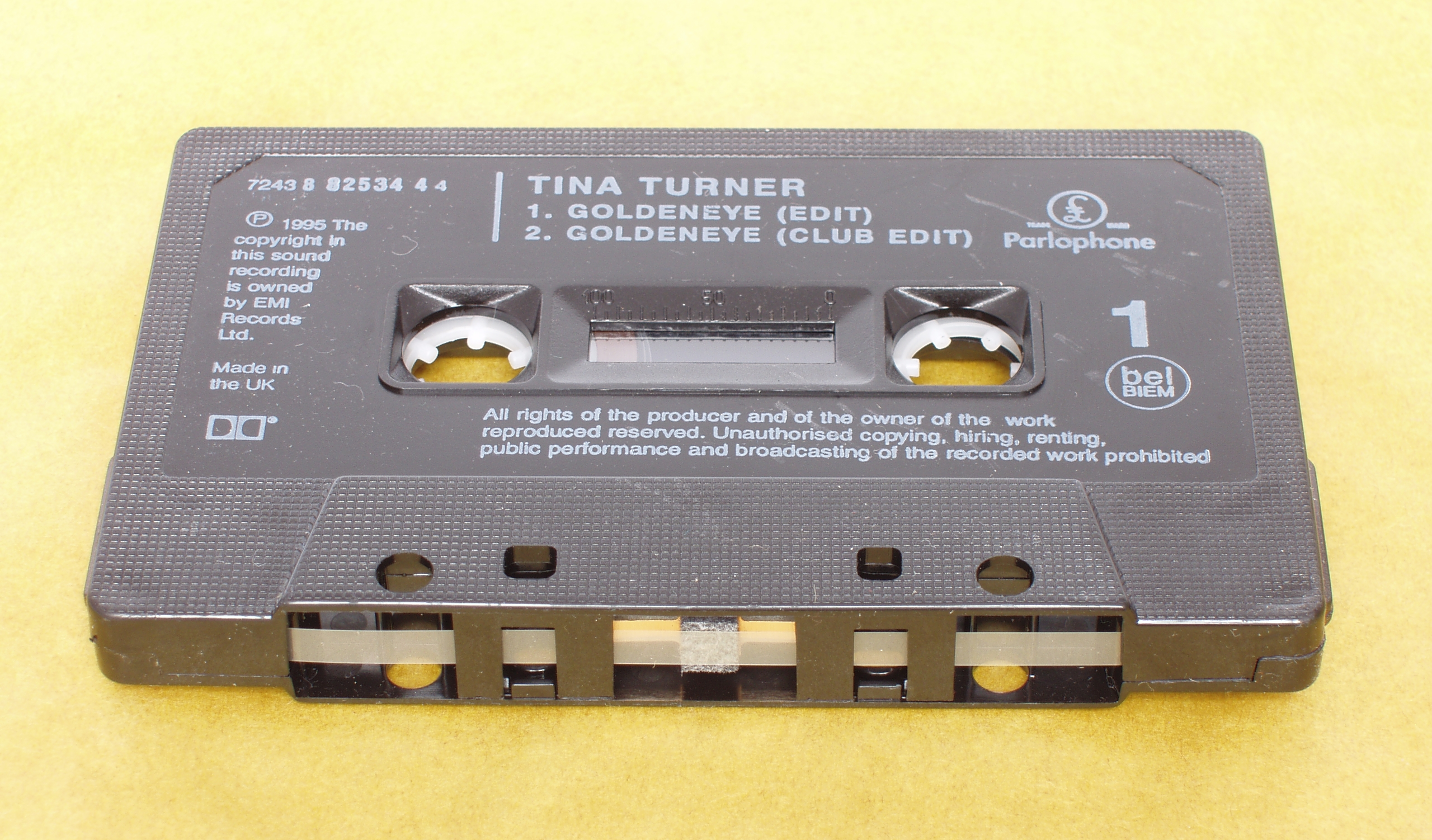
- Released by the Parlophone record label in the UK, Tina Turner's 1995 song GoldenEye as a cassette single, listing the standard 'edit' and an extended 'club edit' on side 1.
- Media type: Magnetic tape
- Encoding: Analogue signal
- Capacity: Between 10–30 minutes total (3-6 songs/versions), sometimes repeated on both sides
- Read mechanism: Tape head
- Standard: Compact Cassette
- Dimensions: 103 × 64 × 12 mm
- Usage: Audio playback
- Released: 1980

A cassette single (CS), also known by the trademark cassingle, or capitalised as the trademark Cassette Single, is a music single supplied in the form of a cassette tape. The cassette single was introduced in 1980.

== History ==
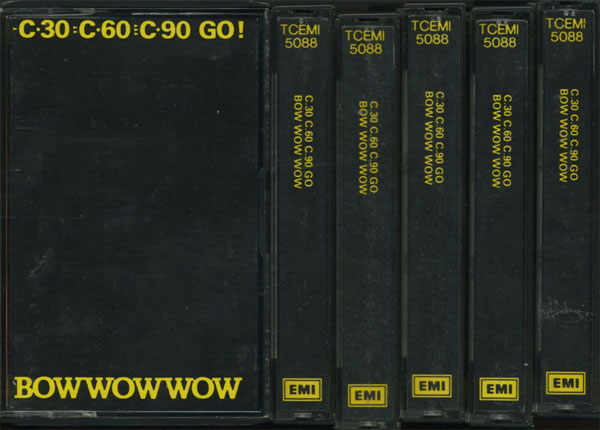
The first ever cassette single to be released, "C·30 C·60 C·90 Go" from Bow Wow Wow.

The debut single "C·30 C·60 C·90 Go" from Bow Wow Wow (catalogue number TCEMI 5088) was the first cassette single released worldwide, issued by EMI in the United Kingdom in 1980. In the United States of America, the first cassette single was released by A&M and I.R.S. Records in 1982 with the Go-Go's "Vacation", which contained two songs available on both sides of the tape.

Initially, the cassette single was supplied containing two or three versions of the primary single, sometimes also together with a B-side song. Typically, between 4 and 20 minutes of music were available on the early cassette singles, though later offerings would be available with five or six different versions of songs.

The British independent record label ZTT Records made good use of the cassette single format by 1984, with singles by Frankie Goes to Hollywood, Art of Noise and Propaganda being issued in unique versions on compact cassette.

American record companies began releasing cassette singles on a large scale in 1987, when vinyl record album sales were declining in favour of cassette recordings; the cassette single was meant to replace the 7-inch 45 rpm record in a similar way.

The cassette single format was used as a promotion in the 1990s, with The Walt Disney Company giving a "cassingle" to attendees of Hercules promotional events.

== Packaging ==
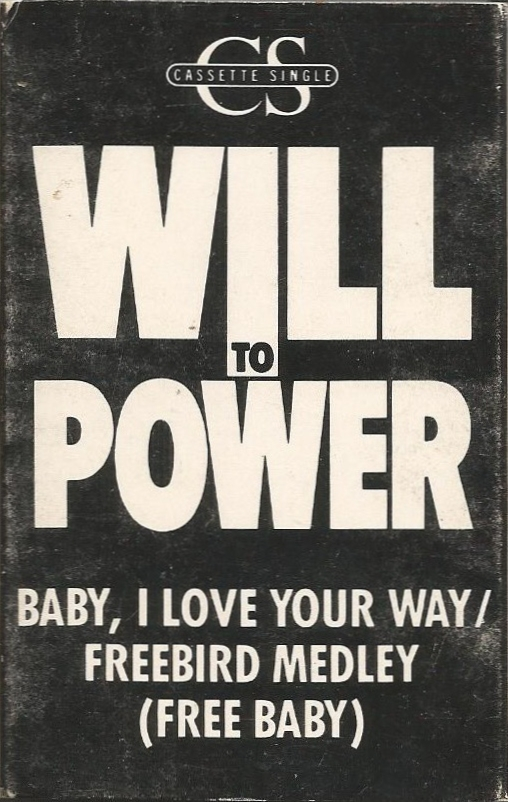
Sleeve cover for the Cassette Single, Baby, I Love Your Way / Freebird Medley (Free Baby) by Will to Power.

A relatively modern cassette single (by T.A.T.u.) in an O case packaging. This single is sold only in the O case and does not have an insert.

Originally, most cassette singles were released in a thick paper sleeve that slipped over the outside of the cassette, called an O case or an O-card. This was then usually shrink wrapped in cellophane plastic. Some singles contained one song on each side, much as 7-inch 45 rpm records had done, but others repeated the songs on both sides. In some markets, cassette singles generally used the same packaging as standard cassettes, a rigid plastic box with a folded paper inlay insert (known as a J-card).

As the cassette maxi single or extended play (EP) was released, more intricate packaging was incorporated that looked similar to the packaging of a regular album cassette. These were placed in standard rigid plastic cassette cases, with a folded paper/cardstock inlay "J-card" insert. Unlike a full-length cassette album, these were generally only one two-sided inlay instead of an extended fold-out (the latter as required for song lyrics, and other additional information usually found on albums). Maxi-singles usually contained four or more versions of a single song; i.e.: typically the '7-inch single', an 'album version', a shorter 'radio edit', and occasionally a 'club edit' or 'dance mix', and a '12-inch extended version'. Other options could include an 'a cappella' version, and / or an 'instrumental' version. Alternatively, some cassette singles contained differing versions of two different songs, as in a 'double A-side'.

== Popularity ==
In the U.S., cassette singles were the most popular single format from 1989 to 1996, overtaking vinyl singles in the former year and being overtaken by CD singles in 1997. In 1989, Roxette's "Listen to Your Heart" became the first Billboard Hot 100 number-one single to only be commercially available as a cassette single, and many other singles released up to the mid 1990s were only available to purchase on this format in the U.S. Cassette singles were completely phased out in most countries by the mid 2000s. In October 2012, American alternative metal band Deftones released "Leathers," the lead single from their album Koi No Yokan, as a cassette single. In April 2013, psychedelic rock band MGMT released the first single from their third album as a cassette single, and October 2014 saw the cassette single "Great Big Happy Green Moonface" from Polaris, the band's first release in fifteen years. In 2020, Lady Gaga released cassette singles for her songs "Stupid Love" and "Rain on Me" from the album Chromatica becoming her first single releases on the format.
