= Rival Schools (band) =

American punk band

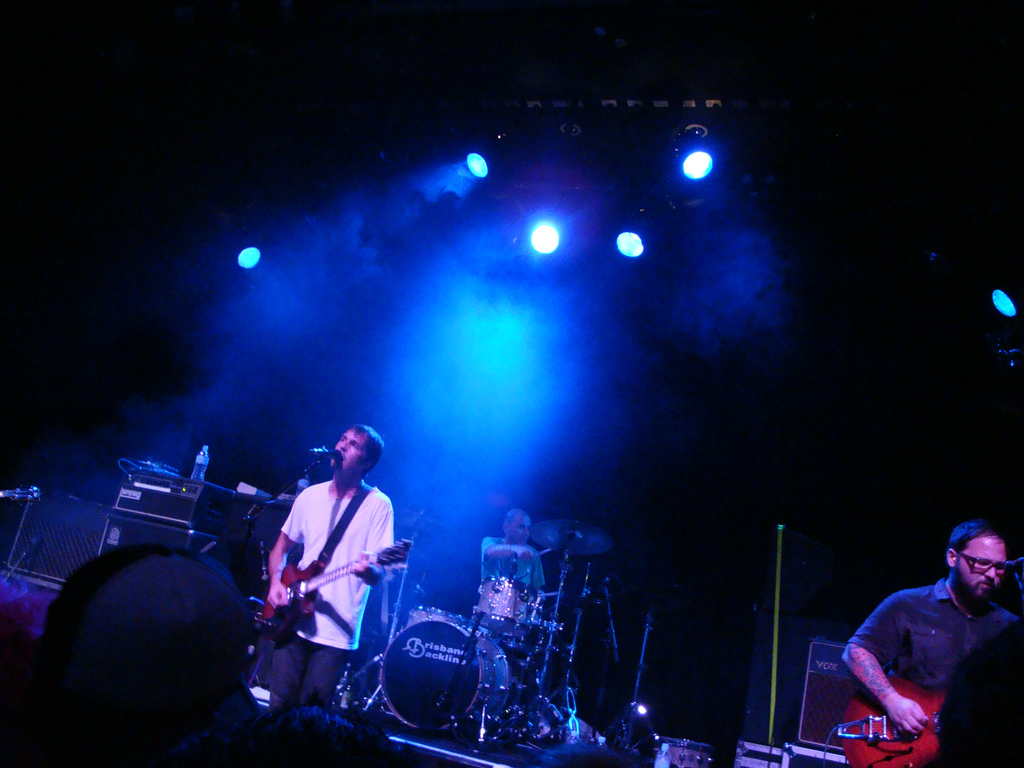
- Rival Schools in concert in 2009

Background information
- Origin: New York City, U.S.
- Genres: Post-hardcore; alternative rock; punk rock; indie rock; emo
- Years active: 1999–2003, 2008–2013, 2022–present
- Labels: Photo Finish, Some Records, Island, Run for Cover
- Members: Walter Schreifels; Cache Tolman; Sammy Siegler; Ian Love
- Past members: Chris Traynor

Rival Schools is an American post-hardcore band from New York City, New York. For most of their tenure, the band has featured Walter Schreifels on vocals and guitar, Ian Love on guitar, Cache Tolman on bass guitar, and Sammy Siegler on drums.

Formed by Schreifels, frontman of Quicksand, Rival Schools is a hardcore supergroup; its members were alumni of '80s and '90s hardcore bands including Gorilla Biscuits (Schreifels), CIV (Siegler), Youth of Today (Schreifels and Siegler) and Iceburn (Tolman).

The band's name (and that of their first LP) comes from the Capcom fighting game Rival Schools: United By Fate. In their short history, the band toured both the United Kingdom (in support of A) and the United States.

In 2008, the band reformed to play some live shows, including Soundwave in Australia, Rock Am Ring in Germany, Hove Festival in Norway, a headline tour and Download Festival in the United Kingdom.

On November 16, 2010, the band released the deluxe single for "Shot After Shot" on iTunes from the forthcoming record Pedals, which was released March 8, 2011. Rival Schools released their third album, Found, on April 9, 2013. Following a tour in support of the album, the band became inactive once again, before reuniting in 2022 to celebrate the 20th anniversary of United By Fate.

== History ==
=== Formation and United by Fate (1999–2002) ===
Rival Schools' first release was based around the concept of a series of EPs where multiple groups would come together to form a single band. For this, they teamed up with former Far leadman, Jonah Matranga. The lone result of this experiment was titled Rival Schools United by Onelinedrawing, released on 24 July 2001 by Schreifels' Some Records.

Their full-length album, United by Fate, was produced by the Grammy-nominated Luke Ebbin and released on 28 August 2001. Due to obligations from Schreifels' time with Quicksand, the album was released by Island Records. Two songs from the album saw release as singles: "Used for Glue" closely followed the album's release, with "Good Things" coming later. Both songs enjoyed heavy rotation on MTV in the US and UK.

=== Rumored second album and dissolution (2003–2007) ===
In between touring with the band, Ian Love formed Cardia and eventually left in 2002 to better focus on them. Regardless, a second album was expected for Spring/Summer 2003, but never surfaced commercially (the master tapes, comprising 11 songs, were later leaked onto the Internet). In June, the band played a few US shows with Thursday. The rest of the band parted ways in September 2003: Schreifels went on to form Walking Concert; Love recorded a self-titled solo album in 2006, released on Limekiln Records; Tolman went on play with Institute; and Siegler joined Nightmare of You and briefly provided percussion for Limp Bizkit.

Despite the band's dissolution, rumours persisted that a new Rival Schools album would be released. This album would presumably be the never-released second LP, however other suggestions have been of an album of B-sides and unreleased songs or of an album of new material, performed by a reformed Rival Schools. Schreifels himself mentioned the likelihood of a new album, with it being mooted for late 2006. The album was mastered in 2012 and eventually released, titled Found, on April 9, 2013, having been unofficially available in mp3 demo form.

=== Reunion (2008–2013) ===
On April 9, 2008 the German Rock am Ring & Rock im Park rock music festivals announced that Rival Schools would perform at the festival on June 8, 2008. The band also played the second stage of the Download Festival in Donington Park, UK on the same day Kiss headlined. The band advertised a 5 date UK tour in Kerrang! Magazine (7 May 2008), and set up an official Myspace page, on which Schreifels revealed the band were writing new material. New songs aired at the UK dates have included 'Big Waves', 'Paranoid Detective', 'On the Frey' and 'Sophia Lauren'. Rival Schools is played a small number of east coast US shows in November, prior to appearing at Fun Fun Fun Festival in Austin, TX in November, and then at the Soundwave festival in February 2009. On January 24, 2009 the band announced on their MySpace that they were entering the studio to start recording their as yet untitled new album. In August 2009, they played the UK Reading & Leeds festivals on the 'Lock Up' stage alongside Mad Caddies, The Bronx and Rise Against. Rival Schools also supported The Offspring at their UK shows.

On November 16, 2010 the band released the deluxe single for "Shot After Shot" on iTunes from the then forthcoming record Pedals

On March 8, 2011 Pedals was released on Photo Finish Records. Ian Love left the band for a second time in September 2011, with the band continuing as a three piece.

In 2013, the band released their third studio album, Found. The album was initially written and recorded as the intended follow-up to United by Fate, but the band split up before completing the release and it was ultimately shelved. Rival Schools played their final show of their reunion on November 19, 2013 at the O2 Academy Brixton in London, England.

=== United By Fate anniversary and reunion (2022–present) ===
In August 2022, an official Rival Schools Instagram page was launched, teasing an upcoming announcement and linking to a new merch store. Shortly after, an official announcement was made that United By Fate would be getting a 20th anniversary re-release through Run for Cover Records, with a 2023 tour also announced. An acoustic version of "Holding Sand" was also released to streaming sites on August 8. The entire original line-up took part in the reunion, which marked Love's first shows with Rival Schools in 12 years. The band played their first shows back in San Diego and Los Angeles on May 10 and May 11, 2023, respectively. In 2024, the band toured as main support for Thursday on their North American tour, alongside Many Eyes. They undertook their own headlining tour later that year, celebrating the 10-year anniversary of Pedals. In October 2025, the band went on a run of co-headlining US shows with Narrow Head.

== Members ==
Current members

- Walter Schreifels – lead vocals, guitar (1999–2003, 2008–2013, 2022–present)
- Cache Tolman – bass (1999–2002, 2008–2013, 2022–present)
- Sam Siegler – drums (1999–2003, 2008–2013, 2022–present)
- Ian Love – guitar (1999–2002, 2008–2011, 2022–present)

Former members

- Chris Traynor – guitar (2002–2003)

== Discography ==
=== Albums ===
List of studio albums, with selected chart positions and certifications
Title	Album details	Peak chart positions						
Title	Album details	US Heat	US Sales	US Rock	SCO	UK	UK Indie	UK Rock
United by Fate	Released: August 28, 2001; Label: Island Records; Formats: CD, DL	—	77	—	92	175	16	18
Pedals	Released: March 8, 2011; Label: Photo Finish Records; Formats: CD, DL	9	—	16	—	112	—	—
Found	Released: April 9, 2013; Label: United By Fate; Formats: CD, DL	—	—	—	—	—	—	—
"—" denotes a recording that did not chart or was not released in that territory.

=== EPs ===
- Rival Schools United by Onelinedrawing (6-track EP) (2001), Some Records
- Some EP (5-track EP) (2022), Run for Cover Records

=== Singles ===
Title	Year	Peak chart positions			Album
Title	Year	SCO	UK	UK Rock	Album
"Used for Glue"	2002	51	42	—	United by Fate
"Travel by Telephone"	2002	—	—	—	United by Fate
"Good Things"	2002	81	74	31	United by Fate
"Shot After Shot"	2010	—	—	—	Pedals
"Wring it Out"	2011	—	—	—	Pedals
"Eyes Wide Open"	2011	—	—	—	Pedals
"—" denotes a recording that did not chart or was not released in that territory.

=== Music Videos ===
- Used For Glue (2002)
- Good Things (2002)
- Shot After Shot (2010)
- Wring it Out (2011)
- Eyes Wide Open (2011)
- You Should Have Hung Out (2025)
