= Quicksand (American band) =

American post-hardcore band

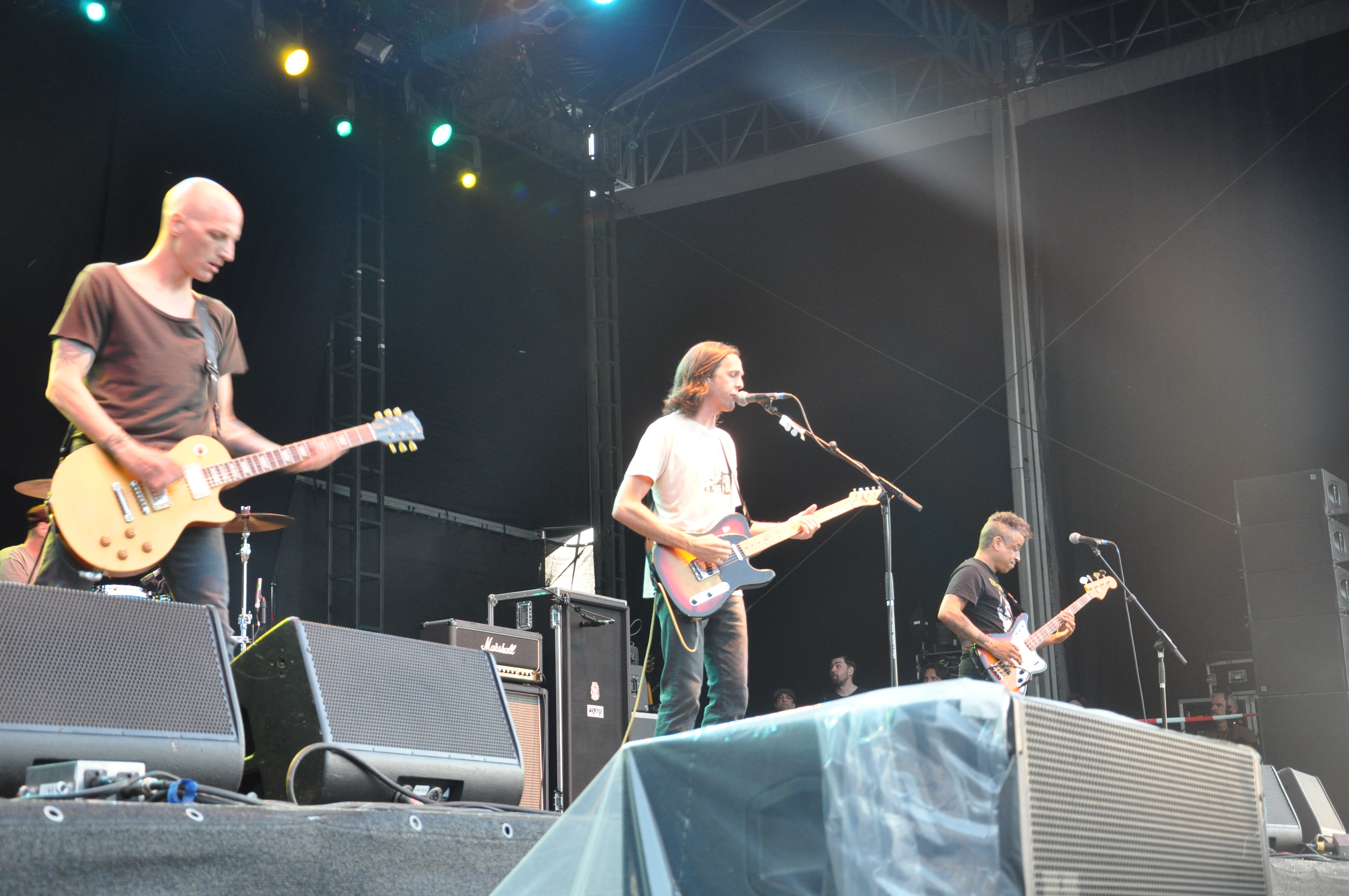
- Quicksand in 2014

Background information
- Origin: New York City, New York, U.S.
- Genres: Post-hardcore; alternative metal
- Years active: 1990–1995; 1997–1999; 2012–present
- Labels: Revelation; Polydor; Island; Epitaph; Equal Vision
- Spinoffs: Handsome; Rival Schools; Walking Concert
- Spinoff of: Seaweed; Bold; Youth of Today; Gorilla Biscuits; Beyond; Burn; Collapse; Absolution
- Members: Walter Schreifels; Alan Cage; Sergio Vega
- Past members: Tom Capone; Charlie Garriga
- Website: quicksandnyc.com

Quicksand is an American post-hardcore band from New York City, founded in 1990. Their debut self-titled EP was followed by two major-label albums, Slip (1993) and Manic Compression (1995). Quicksand's sound has been compared to that of Fugazi and Helmet. The band supported their releases with extensive touring but fell short of the mainstream success anticipated by their labels. These factors and internal stress led them to separate first in 1995 and again in 1999 following a failed year-and-a-half reunion. Quicksand reunited once again in 2012, and has since released three more albums: Interiors (2017), Distant Populations (2021) and Bring On the Psychics (2026).

== History ==
=== Formation (1990) ===
The musicians who would come to form Quicksand had their roots in the New York Hardcore scene. Frontman/guitarist Walter Schreifels, the main creative force behind the Gorilla Biscuits and bassist for Youth of Today, assembled the band's lineup from his dissolved Moondog project. Guitarist Tom Capone had founded Long Island's Beyond (releasing a demo and LP via Combined Effort Records) and had previously played in Bold, writing their album Looking Back. Drummer Alan Cage had been in the experimental hardcore band Burn and played with Capone in Beyond. Bassist Sergio Vega arrived from the short lived Collapse and a later incarnation of Absolution. For Quicksand's initial live shows, Charlie Garriga (a founding member of Outface) played rhythm guitar, but he left the band not long after; thus, Schreifels sang lead vocals and played rhythm guitar.

=== Major releases, touring, and breakup (1990–1995) ===
Quicksand recorded the four-track EP Quicksand roughly six weeks after their formation. It was released through the hardcore independent label Revelation Records later in 1990. The band performed at club venues and rose to touring North America and Europe with Helmet, Fugazi, Rage Against the Machine, Anthrax, and White Zombie. Their exposure led to the band signing a record deal with major label Polydor Records in 1992, thereby becoming the first post-hardcore band to do so. The label issued Quicksand's first full-length album, Slip on February 9, 1993, with "Dine Alone" being their first single. The album also featured two tracks that were re-recorded from the "Quicksand" EP ("Omission" and "Unfulfilled"). The following year saw the band tour the United States with The Offspring, performing 250 live shows to support the album. By 1995, the album had sold around 100,000 copies.

On February 28, 1995, they released their latter, more successful album Manic Compression on Island Records and later that year rejoined The Offspring on their European tour. Manic Compression reached No. 135 on the Billboard 200 Chart and No. 9 on the Heatseakers Chart and garnered Quicksand an invitation to the first Vans Warped Tour. However, internal conflicts and the stresses of constant touring led to the band's break-up at the height of their popularity on October 12, 1995, following a show in Hollywood, California.

=== Reunion and unfinished album (1997–1999) ===
Following Quicksand's initial split, Walter Schreifels started his World's Fastest Car project and produced records for the hardcore punk band CIV. Tom Capone joined former Helmet guitarist Pete Mengede's supergroup Handsome, releasing a self-titled album in 1997. Sergio Vega began his own solo project entitled Fully while DJing in New York City, and Alan Cage joined the alternative rock band Seaweed, who had also performed on the Warped Tour.

In mid-1997, the band members were rumored to have been considering a reunion with the intent to perform on Revelation Night at Brownies during the CMJ Music Conference that September. However, Quicksand's first public appearance since their 1995 split would not come until February 6, 1998, in Osaka, Japan. (A subsequent show in Hawaii was canceled.) In August 1998, they entered Carriage House Studios in Stamford, Connecticut with producer Steven Haigler to begin recording material written in the prior six months. After the band's first North American performance in three years on September 26, 1998, in Boulder, Colorado, they were invited to extend their tour with Deftones and Snapcase and on November 3, 1998, started what was to be ultimately their last tour. Quicksand then returned to the studio to continue working on the new album; despite the recent successful tour and a more collaborative effort in the writing process, resurfaced tensions would eventually split up the band indefinitely in late 1999 and doom the material to remain officially unreleased. The unfinished album, as well as demo material from the Manic Compression sessions, has since been circulated on the Internet.

=== Post-Quicksand activities (1999–2012) ===
Walter Schreifels went on to form the alternative rock band Rival Schools with former bandmate and CIV drummer Sammy Siegler, releasing the album United by Fate in 2001 (before splitting in 2003). Schreifels later fronted Walking Concert on his independent record label Some Records. During that time, Schreifels mixed in occasional solo acoustic performances. In 2008, Rival Schools reformed for live performances at various festivals, and in 2011 they released their second album Pedals. Tom Capone played guitar for Instruction for the majority of the band's existence beginning in December 2002. Sergio Vega has played bass for Deftones, filling in for Chi Cheng on tour in 1999 and from June 2009 to early 2021. Vega was recruited to compose their album Diamond Eyes, which was released on May 4, 2010. Alan Cage contributed to Enemy's Hooray for Dark Matter in 2005 and later worked with New Idea Society and the hardcore band 108.

=== Second reunion (2012–present) ===
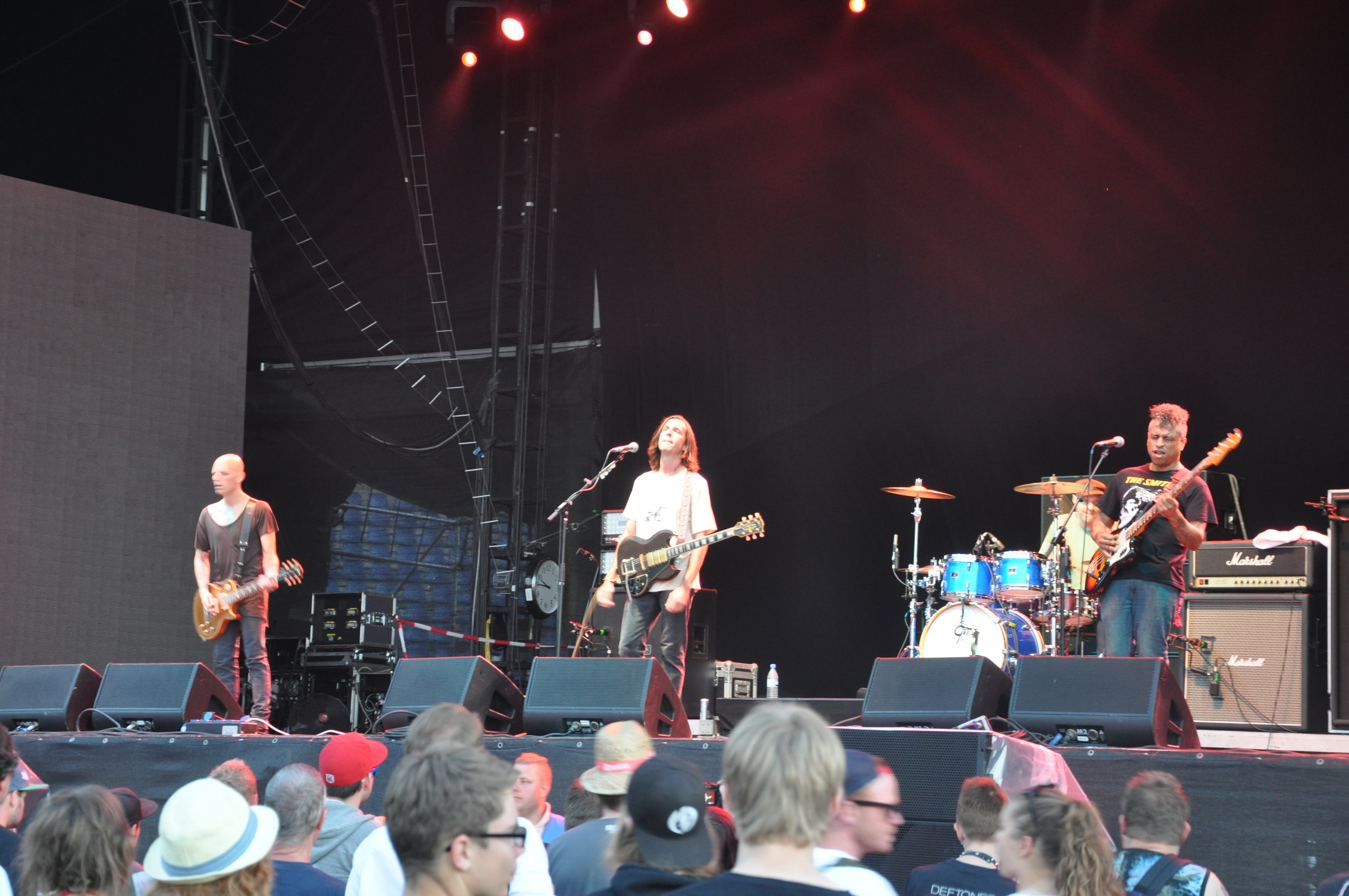
Quicksand at Rock am Ring 2014

On June 10, 2012, Quicksand was the unannounced "special guest" on the fourth night of the Revelation Records 25th Anniversary Shows at The Glass House in Pomona, California. The original members appeared together on stage for the first time in nearly 13 years, performing a five-song set that ended with their cover of The Smiths' "How Soon Is Now?". Quicksand later performed at Bowery Ballroom in New York City on August 24, the Music Hall of Williamsburg in Brooklyn, NY on August 25, and the FYF Fest in Los Angeles, California on September 1. In January 2013, Quicksand embarked on their first North American tour in 15 years. They also performed at the Pukkelpop Festival (The Shelter stage) in Hasselt, Belgium on August 15, 2013.

On July 18, 2013, Quicksand posted a photo (which had since been removed) on Twitter that involved studio activity, indicating that the band was planning to release new material. Asked in July 2017 if it was true that they were working on new material, frontman Walter Schreifels responded, "Can't confirm or deny."

On August 21, 2017, Quicksand's Twitter feed and Walter Schreifels' Instagram account teased the title of their long-awaited third album, Interiors, to be released some time this year over a 30-second video clip. On the following day, the band streamed their first single in 22 years "Illuminant", and announced that Interiors would be released on November 10, 2017, on Epitaph Records.

On September 12, 2017, while on-tour in Phoenix, Arizona, guitarist Tom Capone was arrested (and missed the evening's show at The Crescent Ballroom) for shoplifting and resisting arrest at the local CVS drug store. The band released a statement soon after that Tom was "heading home to get better," and the band resumed the tour as a three-piece. Capone never rejoined the band, shifting Schreifels to both rhythm and lead guitar duties. Their first release without Capone was the 12" EP Triptych Continuum, which was released on April 21, 2018, through Epitaph, coinciding with Record Store Day.

By April 2021, Quicksand had reportedly been working on new material for their fourth studio album. The band released their first song in three years, "Inversion", on April 13, 2021, through streaming services. The band released the single "Missile Command" on June 23 and announced that the new album would be titled Distant Populations. Distant Populations was released digitally on August 13, while a vinyl version will be released on September 25.

In mid-August 2021, Quicksand posted a video of the song "Colossus" with Stephen Brodsky on guitar and backing vocals. Brodsky subsequently accompanied Quicksand on their late 2021 tour in support of Distant Populations returning Quicksand to a four piece—the first time since the arrest of Tom Capone.

On February 3, 2023, Quicksand announced a 30th Anniversary Edition of their debut LP "Slip" being re-issued on vinyl by the Boston-based record label Iodine Recordings. The 30th Anniversary Edition of "Slip" included a 64-page hardcover book with band photographs, rare concert posters, and a foreword by Walter Schreifels. The book also contains commentary from notable musicians from the punk scene, including: Scott Ian of Anthrax, Geoff Rickly of Thursday, Stephen Brodsky of Cave In, Dennis Lyxzén of Refused, Tim McIlrath of Rise Against, and many more. The record was remastered for vinyl using the original 1993 master tapes.

On April 23, 2026, the band announced their official signing to Equal Vision Records and their fifth studio album, Bring On the Psychics, was released on July 17 of the same year.

== Influences ==
Quicksand has cited various bands as influences, including Fugazi, Jane's Addiction, Helmet, My Bloody Valentine, Shudder To Think, Rites of Spring, Embrace, Dag Nasty, Soulside, Igniton, Cocteau Twins, Wire, Public Enemy, and Led Zeppelin.

== Band members ==
Current

- Walter Schreifels – lead vocals, rhythm guitar (1990–1995, 1997–1999, 2012–present); lead guitar (2017–present)
- Sergio Vega – bass (1990–1995, 1997–1999, 2012–present)
- Alan Cage – drums, percussion (1990–1995, 1997–1999, 2012–present)

Former

- Tom Capone – lead guitar (1990–1995, 1997–1999, 2012–2017)
- Charlie Garriga – rhythm guitar (1990)
- Stephen Brodsky – lead guitar (2021–2023; touring)

== Discography ==
=== Studio albums ===
List of studio albums, with selected details and chart positions
Title	Details	Peak chart positions									
Title	Details	US	US Alt.	US Heat.	US Indie.	US Rock	BEL (WAL)	GER	SCO	UK Rock	UK Indie.
Slip	Released: February 9, 1993; Label: Polydor	—	—	—	—	—	—	—	—	—	—
Manic Compression	Released: February 28, 1995; Label: Island	135	—	9	—	—	—	—	—	—	—
Interiors	Released: November 10, 2017; Label: Epitaph	142	9	1	7	18	—	—	—	13	16
Distant Populations	Released: August 13, 2021; Label: Epitaph	—	—	—	—	—	167	36	94	15	38
Bring On the Psychics	Released: July 17, 2026; Label: Equal Vision	—	—	—	—	—	—	—	—	—	—
"—" denotes items that did not chart or were not released in that territory.

=== Extended plays ===
List of extended plays with selected details
Title	Details
Quicksand	Released: 1990; Label: Revelation
Triptych Continuum	Released: April 21, 2018; Label: Epitaph
Split (with Hot Water Music)	Released: October 29, 2024; Label: Equal Vision

=== Singles ===
==== 1990s ====
List of singles released from 1992 to 1995, with selected chart positions
Title	Year	Peak chart positions			Album
Title	Year	US Rock Air (R&R)	US AOR (R&R)	US College (CMJ)	Album
"Fazer"	1993	—	—	—	Slip
"Dine Alone"	1993	—	54	—	Slip
"Omission"	1993	—	—	—	Slip
"Freezing Process"	1994	—	—	—	Slip
"Divorce"	1995	—	—	—	Manic Compression
"Delusional"	1995	—	—	2	Manic Compression
"Thorn in My Side"	1995	55	—	—	Manic Compression
"Landmine Spring"	1995	—	—	—	Manic Compression
"—" denotes items that did not chart or were not released in that territory.

==== 2010s–present ====
List of singles released from 2017 to the present
Title	Year	Album
"Illuminant"	2017	Interiors
"Cosmonauts"	2017	Interiors
"Inversion"	2021	Distant Populations
"Missile Command"	2021	Distant Populations
"Giving the Past Away"	2022	Non-album single
"Felíz"	2022	Non-album single
"Get to It"	2026	Bring On the Psychics
"Regenerate"	2026	Bring On the Psychics
"Crystallize"	2026	Bring On the Psychics
"Cool Guy"	2026	Bring On the Psychics

=== Compilation appearances ===
Year	Title	Track	Notes
1993	CBGB 20th Anniversary Compilation	"How Soon is Now?" (3:22)	Recorded live at CBGB
1995	Hit Me: Previously Unavailable	"Chelsea's Going Under" (3:40)	
1995	Hits Rock – New Sckoool, Volume I	"Landmine Spring"	
1995	Empire Records soundtrack	"Thorn in My Side"	
1996	Anti-Matter	"Shovel"	
2002	Revelation 100: A 15 Year Retrospective	"Dine Alone" (3:19)	Previously unreleased 1992 demo

=== Unreleased material ===
Year	Details	Tracks	Notes
1994	"True Manic Demos"	1. "Bug Collector" (3:08); 2. "World's Fastest Car" (3:56); 3. "Knee Jerk Reaction" (3:12); 4. "Supergenius" (2:56)	Recorded during the Manic Compression sessions; Tracks 1-3: conventional titles given as the actual titles have not been confirmed
1998	"Unfinished Third Album"	1. "Instrumental" (4:39); 2. "All in Your Head" (3:26); 3. "Requiem" (3:39); 4. "In the End" (3:18); 5. "Constant Tension" (4:20); 6. "Hostage Calm" (5:12); 7. "Weed It Out" (3:03); 8. "Chelsea's Going Under" (3:59)	Recorded from August 1998 to 1999; Tracks 1-7: conventional titles given as the actual titles have not been confirmed; Track 2: re-recorded and released on Rival Schools's first album, United by Fate as "So Down On"; Track 8: re-recorded version with alternate lyrics

=== Music videos ===
Year	Album	Title	Director
1993	Slip	Fazer	Pamela Birkhead
1993	Slip	Dine Alone	Noah Bogen
1993	Slip	Omission	Kevin Kerslake
1994	Slip	Freezing Process	Kevin Kerslake
1995	Manic Compression	Thorn in My Side	Marcos Siega
1995	Manic Compression	Delusional	Marcos Siega
2017	Interiors	Illuminant	Mortis Studio
2017	Interiors	Cosmonauts	n/c
2017	Interiors	Interiors	
2021	Distant Populations	Inversion	Rob Fidel
2022	Distant Populations	Missile Command	Rob Fidel
2026	Bring On the Psychics	Get To It	Jesse Korman
2026	Bring On the Psychics	Regenerate	Jesse Korman
2026	Bring On the Psychics	Crystallize	Jesse Korman
2026	Bring On the Psychics	Cool Guy	Jesse Korman
