= Run to Be Born =

Studio album by Walking Concert
- Released: September 7, 2004
- Genre: Indie rock
- Length: 35:45
- Label: Some Records

Professional ratings
Review scores
Source	Rating
AllMusic	4.5/5 stars

Run to Be Born is the debut album by the band Walking Concert, released on September 7, 2004.

== Track listing ==
1. "What's Your New Thing?"
2. "Aluminium"
3. "But You Know...Its True"
4. "Run to Be Born"
5. "Studio Space"
6. "Girls in the Field"
7. "The Animals"
8. "Audrey"
9. "What Does Your Heart Say?"
10. "Hands Up!"
11. "Mustang Ford"
12. "Calypso Slide"
13. "A Lot to Expect"
14. "Ok"

== Album credits ==
- Walter Schreifels - performer
- Walking Concert - main performer
