= Slip (album) =

Studio album by Quicksand
- Released: February 9, 1993
- Recorded: 1992
- Studios: Long View Farm (North Brookfield, Massachusetts)
- Genres: Post-hardcore; alternative metal
- Length: 39:04
- Label: Polydor
- Producers: Steven Haigler; Don Fury

Quicksand chronology
Quicksand (1990)	Slip (1993)	Manic Compression (1995)

Singles from Slip
- 1. "Fazer" Released: March 8, 1993 (Note: While "Fazer" served as the lead single from the album, Polydor pressed 5,000 copies of "Dine Alone" as a 7-inch vinyl single earlier in 1992, which the band distributed during a five-week summer tour supporting Helmet. The song was later serviced to radio on May 10, 1993, following "Fazer".); 2. "Dine Alone" Released: May 10, 1993; 3. "Omission" Released: 1993; 4. "Freezing Process" Released: 1994

Slip is the debut studio album by American post-hardcore band Quicksand, released on February 9, 1993, through Polydor Records. "Omission" and "Unfulfilled" first appeared on their 1990 self-titled EP. Slip was well received by music critics and is now considered a classic in the post-hardcore and alternative metal genres, influencing many acts including Torche and Deftones.

The lead single off the album, "Fazer", became a college radio hit. The album was reissued on vinyl in 2012, through Dine Alone Records and Shop Radio Cast. The reissue featured a cover of The Smiths song "How Soon Is Now?".

On February 3, 2023, Quicksand announced a 30th Anniversary Edition of their debut LP "Slip" being re-issued on vinyl by the Boston based record label Iodine Recordings. The 30th Anniversary Edition of "Slip" also included a 64-page hardcover book with band photographs, rare concert posters, and a foreword by Walter Schreifels. The book also contains commentary from notable musicians from the punk scene, including: Scott Ian of Anthrax, Geoff Rickly of Thursday, Stephen Brodsky of Cave In, Dennis Lyxzén of Refused, Tim McIlrath of Rise Against, and many more. The record was also remastered for vinyl using the original 1993 master tapes.

== Background and development ==
The members of Quicksand each had prior associations with New York City hardcore bands and released their self-titled debut EP on the independent Revelation Records in 1990. Though released on a small label, the EP attracted attention within the underground and ultimately led to the band signing with the major label Polydor Records. The vocalist and guitarist Walter Schreifels later recalled that the opportunity came as a surprise, noting that the band had expected to remain a niche act rather than reach a mainstream audience. Coming from the hardcore punk scene, the members were initially hesitant to accept the offer, as they weighed the cultural and ethical implications of moving from the underground to a corporate label. Ultimately, the band decided to proceed, viewing it as an opportunity to focus more fully on music and improve their living situation.

In 1992, Quicksand began recording their debut full-length album Slip at Long View Farm Studios in North Brookfield, Massachusetts. Signing with Polydor brought the band into circumstances that contrasted sharply with their beginnings. Schreifels noted that their debut EP had been recorded on a budget of about $1,500, while their first major label sessions involved studios where costs were significantly higher. Despite this, he recalled that they were granted considerable creative freedom during the process. For the album, Quicksand chose to work with Don Fury, a producer closely associated with the New York hardcore scene, alongside the producer Steven Haigler. While acknowledging their roots in aggressive New York hardcore, Schreifels stated in 1993 that the band aimed to pursue a more cerebral approach, adding that "Aggressive music is great, but we want to make songs that have a point as well." Schreifels also said they "really wanted to capture a fucking-around-in-rehearsal type feeling — the kind of total energetic release you get when you're playing from the heart and just spilling your guts."

As they worked on the record, Schreifels recalled that the band was conscious of rapid changes taking place in music at the time, an awareness he said existed even before Nirvana's rise, pointing to Sonic Youth's presence on the Billboard charts. While the band recognized potential in this climate, Schreifels stated that they were not planning a career trajectory. Instead, he said that Quicksand's aim was to make "a cool record for the people we wanted to affect", while navigating what he described as "all of these crosscurrents". He added that the idea of the album becoming "big" felt abstract, as the band did not know who a larger audience might be or what it would want from them, though he described the period as one in which "really exciting and unusual stuff" was briefly being given wider exposure and said the band was fortunate to be part of it.

Against this backdrop, rather than attempting to follow or anticipate prevailing trends, Schreifels explained that Quicksand sought to develop something distinct from the surrounding alternative rock movement. Coming out of the hardcore scene, the band aimed to retain what they valued from it while also introducing a more experimental approach. The bassist Sergio Vega stated that Slip's music is "an expansion of hard-core. We changed the sound, the chord progressions, [but] not the ideals." Schreifels cited Fugazi, Jane's Addiction, and Helmet as key inspirations: Fugazi for their avant-garde, DIY sensibility; Jane's Addiction for their "experimental and sexy" rock music; and Helmet for their "jazzy, math thing". He noted that these bands were older than Quicksand, describing the group as "regurgitating their sound with our influences", and concluded, "If you play outside of the border, but you still remain in the castle, you can come up with really interesting stuff".

== Composition ==
Slip has been described as post-hardcore (Note: Attributed to multiple references:) and alternative metal. Reviewing the album, Ron Givens of Stereo Review described Quicksand's sound as comprising equal parts punk, metal, and angst, noting that "The men of Quicksand can bludgeon home a musical point if they want to, but more often they create just as much or more power by underplaying the fury and brutality of the genres they juxtapose." Stephen Thomas Erlewine of AllMusic observed that Slip relied more on metal than punk, arguing that this made the music more effective, as the band's "brutal, gut-level heavy riff-rockers" were stronger than its "attempts at punky fury". Emma Johnston of Metal Hammer similarly characterized the album as a more metal-influenced take on post-hardcore. Some writers emphasized how Slip stretched beyond strict genre definitions. Andrew Bonazeli of Decibel argued that the expansive label "post-hardcore" did not fully capture its sound. Tom Watson of The Quietus similarly wrote that an "infinite spell of genre wooing soared within Slip's dozen tracks". Givens also noted that the record departed from punk and metal convention, observing that although those genres often "clomp along like only one rhythm is allowed", Slip was at times "downright sinuous".

"Dine Alone"
"Dine Alone" exemplifies the use of tightened and released tension on Slip.

Slip makes use of quiet-loud dynamics and space. The material is also marked by halting rhythms and varied tempos, resulting in songs that move at a more moderate pace than might be expected, with this pacing allowing room for emotional range and detailed musical development. Throughout the album, tension is repeatedly tightened and released through the use of droning rhythms, extended pauses, and bass-driven passages that at times are nearly devoid of guitar. Wiederhorn commented that this indicated "the band listened to far more than New York hardcore". Guitars play a central role in Slip, featuring repetitive riffs, swirling textures, sustained feedback, dissonance, and dual-guitar interplay that Bryne Yancey of Punknews.org said "remains a defining feature of their sound two decades later." Givens wrote that the riffs "get piled on and peeled off to create a surging kind of dynamism". Critics frequently highlighted Slip for its balance of aggression and melody, though Givens opined that "Melody isn't as important as riffs" on the album. These elements coexist with gleaming guitar solos and prominent bass lines and supports Cage's tumbling, often syncopated beats. Cage's drumming throughout the album frequently accents off-beats with nimble crashes and bell hits, with snare strikes cutting through incessant hi-hat patterns.

Schreifels' vocals on Slip were described in several ways. Critics variously described his delivery as "raging", "angst-ridden", "strained", and "strung-out", with Harry writing that it sounds as if it had been "dragged through shards of glass". His vocal style was frequently compared to other singers. Gina Arnold of Entertainment Weekly remarked on a "fetching Kurt Cobain-like catch in his bellow", while Jon Wiederhorn of Loudwire described Schreifels' "singy-screamy vocals" as "the perfect hybrid of Henry Rollins and Fugazi's Ian MacKaye". Critics also highlighted how Schreifels' voice functioned within the band's overall sound. Erlewine emphasized how his voice fit into the album's "dense wall of sound", while Ashare wrote that the album's "relentless assault coalesces around" Schreifels' "angst-ridden, raw-throated, self-improvement manifestoes". Terich wrote that his "pitch-perfect screams" intensified the group's "melodic hardcore assault", making the melodies "hit like a sack full of bricks". Scott McLennan of the Telegram & Gazette observed that Schreifels' vocal delivery "butchers the meter and flow of lines, creating jagged textures and off-kilter tones in the songs".

Vega wrote that all the topics on Slip are introspective and personal, while Schreifels called the album "introverted and cathartic as a form of personal expression". Schreifels also said "I think Slip was reflective of how a lot of people my age felt at the time — and probably how people that age always feel […] I think my peers in the hardcore world felt the same way to some degree". Givens characterized the songs as addressing "young-life crises", with emotions ranging from frustration to anger. McLennan described the lyrics as "wry", writing that they "bash the status quo and tap streams of alienation and self-doubt". Mitch Ancona of The Ridgefield Press wrote that the lyrics were often obscured by the music but, when comprehensible, "conjure up vivid and realistic images of rage, frustration and hope". Emily Hausman of Punk Planet said that the album "focuses thematically on power and passion". Pearn found that the lyrics left room for interpretation, while Ashare wrote that Schreifels "digs deeper than your average ranter".

=== Comparisons ===
While Slip has been compared to numerous bands, critics frequently pointed to Fugazi (Note: Attributed to multiple references:) and Helmet. (Note: Attributed to multiple references:) Arnold wrote that Quicksand's "operative influences"—Helmet and Fugazi—were "highly agreeable ones". J. J. Anselmi of The A.V. Club characterized Slip as combining Helmet's heaviness with Fugazi's tendency "to dismantle sound in the most energetic ways", and likened the album to the result of melting down Helmet's Meantime (1992) and Fugazi's Repeater (1990) in a foundry. Erlewine described the album's "dense, metallic grind" as a more streamlined version of Fugazi, while Andrew Sacher of BrooklynVegan wrote that the album "brazenly fucked with the hardcore formula like Fugazi". Sam Wood of The Philadelphia Inquirer wrote that while Quicksand was "not quite Fugazi", he acknowledged that "Slip may be the closest thing you'll find to the fabled Fugazi sound at your local mall record shop". Regarding comparisons to Helmet, the Arizona Daily Star likened the album to Helmet's "ceaseless hammering and throbbing", with a greater pop sensibility, while Frank Pearn Jr. of The Morning Call similarly described it as "a less heavy Helmet".

Alongside Fugazi and Helmet, Sacher likened the album's approach to Sonic Youth, My Bloody Valentine, the Smiths, and Jane's Addiction, citing its cleverness, ethereal quality, introspection, and hooks, respectively. Bonazelli described Slip as "fusing equal parts Helmet staccato, Soundgarden sack and My Bloody Valentine dreampop into something entirely its own". Josh Modell of The A.V. Club wrote that Slip, along with the band's second studio album Manic Compression (1995), "trod similar ground" to contemporaries such as Helmet and Rage Against the Machine. Wiederhorn wrote that the "self-deprecating, navel-gazing vibe" of bands such as the Cure, the Smiths, Swans, and Joy Division "echo through Quicksand's fragmented rhythms", adding that the album reflects Quicksand's "familiarity with and affection for gloomy English pop bands" such as the Cure and the Smiths.

Critics also distinguished Quicksand's approach from that of their contemporaries. Matt Terich of Treble said that unlike many of the band's contemporaries such as Helmet, Orange 9mm, and Rage Against the Machine, Quicksand was "fluid and dynamic". He wrote that "Where Helmet delivers non-stop rock and awe, Quicksand plays like something more poetic: sometimes jarring and neurotic, at other times soothing, almost psychedelic." Watson wrote that "less like Helmet, Orange 9mm or even Fugazi, there was no call for subtlety".

=== Songs ===
"Fazer"
The intro of "Fazer". Giedre Matulaityte of Alternative Press described the song's guitar intro as "simple, melodic, heavy and relatively slow", writing that it "is almost like the whole of Slip in a nutshell".

"Fazer" begins with Cage's drumming, which Anselmi described as a "Bonham triplet and flam" that "instantly convey[ed]" Cage's "penchant to beat the shit out of the drums". Wiederhorn wrote that the song starts with a "colossal beat and a surging riff ghosted by a moody bassline". The intro leads into what Anselmi called a "mammoth backbeat, which Schreifels offsets with syncopated shouts that cryptically describe the identity crisis of a loved one". Wiederhorn observed that "As the song build, the band piles on and removes additional guitars of varying intensity". He described the chorus, introduced by a "shrill, catchy lick", as "the kind of vague declaration of discontent that spoke to disenchanted twenty-somethings of the early '90s". Ashare interpreted the song as confronting the urge to conform.

"Head to Wall" opens with a bass line. Anselmi wrote that Vega's bass drives the verse, which starts with uptempo rock before it "revels in dissonance by resting for a full measure". He noted that Vega and Cage "work[ed] as the undercurrent" for Capone and Schreifels' "wave of cynical pop harmonies". Anselmi compared the song's simple breakdown to the hardcore sing-alongs of Gorilla Biscuits and Youth of Today. Stephen Hill of Louder described Schreifels' melodies throughout "Head to Wall" as "throat shredding yet inescapable". Lyrically, Kevin Ruggeri of Pitchfork wrote that the song "uncovers the plight of American society", captured in the line: "We all want everything but we all can't fit in the door."

"Dine Alone" opens with Cage's "signature thundering drum work" alongside distortion and feedback that Terich described as "intense and subtle all at once", before resolving into what he called "the Quicksand dissonance". Anselmi noted the song's movement between "palm mutes and high, discordant chords", with Cage adding "oddly placed fills" in the introduction. According to Wiederhorn, the track layers "a lunging guitar line with abrasive stabs of distortion and a staggered beat", while its midsection opens up to "breathe and meander like Nothing's Shocking-era Jane's Addiction". Hill described "Dine Alone" as shifting between "shimmering dream pop and grinding metal", while Yancey highlighted the band's ability to "seamlessly escalate and recede tension throughout the song". Yancey also pointed to details such as a "downtuned, nearly riff-less, buzzing guitar" in the second verse, Schreifels' "perfect enunciation even while screaming", and Vega's "clean-yet-threatening" bass tone. The theme of isolation and disenchantment surfaces in "Dine Alone", where Schreifels "ponders the existential implications of eating alone".

The album's title track, "Slip", runs just over two minutes and, according to Anselmi, features Capone and Schreifels' guitars that "plow forward like an indifferent stream of rush hour traffic". He described the song as "a microcosm of Slip", noting it is "completely devoid of bullshit" in how it took "the shortest road possible to get the point across". Ruggeri remarked that the track "loses itself within the odd rhythmic meters". "Freezing Process" begins with Vega's gentle bass chords, which Anselmi notes are "quickly destroyed with a noisy barrage" from the rest of the band. With Schreifel "rage[ing] against apathy", the song unfolds as a "push and pull between elegance and brute force", as described by Hill. Anselmi wrote that a dual guitar lead drives the chorus, with notes that "don't conform to any traditional scale" but "push against each other to create an underlying discord". In the bridge, Vega drops out and Cage's polyrhythmic drumming carries the guitars, "hitting upbeats on his ride while building a tom groove that emphasizes the downbeat", according to Anselmi.

According to Kevin Ruggeri of Pitchfork, aggression reaches its musical peak in "Lie and Wait", which he described as "a scorching outcry against unjust wages for working women". It features what Yancey called an "escalated, dirty-bass heavy breakdown" while transitioning between "bludgeoning rock and spacey shoegaze", with each section marked by "crisp transitions". "Unfulfilled" is a reworked version of a song from Quicksand's self-titled EP, and places Schreifels' vocals at the forefront during the verses, with Anselmi noting that the song then moves into "a subtly caustic groove" before opening up into "another tongue-in-cheek dual guitar lead". Anselmi also described the ending, where Capone performs "a spiraling solo that sounds like he's ripping the strings from his guitar, destroying this rock cliché from the inside". Watson observed that while the track features "discordant scratches and cavernous bass rolls", Schreifels delivers his vocals with intense focus, reciting lines such as "To stand alone / To be without the glue, that keeps us glued together / And feeling so excrementable," which Watson compared to "a gauche Ian Mackaye operating a speeding locomotive, tearing away from the rails."

In "Can Opener", a commentary on vanity, Cage guides the band through each section with extended drum fills "bookmarked by adroit doubles", according to Anselmi. Schreifels delivers his vocals in a syncopated style, shouting lines such as "The attention you're not getting, it makes you so upset" amid a breakdown that balances pop and heaviness. The track later moves into a sparse, jazzy section before concluding with a "windstorm of cacophony", following the movement of Cage's fills throughout the song. "Omission" is a reworked version of a song from Quicksand's self-titled EP, with Ruggeri noting that the new rendition "actually increases the intensity and fury of the original". Schreifels called the track a "mission statement", explaining that he wanted it to set the tone for the band, drawing inspiration from a part in Led Zeppelin's "D'yer Mak'er". Anselmi noted Schreifels' "punchy vocals" and added that "Instead of the one-sided anger in many hardcore lyrics, however, he implicates himself in his tirade about self-delusion when he says, 'Your story is always changing / We change it to hide the pain.'" The track concludes on a ringing note that blends into the TV-static noise introducing the following song, "Baphomet".

"Baphomet" is an instrumental track that explores a variety of textures and atmospheres. Terich described it as traversing "a world of rock flavors, from Fugazi-esque noise rock to swirly, shoegazer spans, a la Swervedriver or My Bloody Valentine". Wiederhorn described it as "an instrumental tidal wave of stomp boxes, distortion and feedback" that moves across the stereo field like "a hurricane whose eye passes over a town a minute or two before the destruction begins anew". Anselmi observed that "airy yet abrasive guitar notes winnow through" the track as Schreifels and Capone "occupy opposing ends of the sonic spectrum", with the guitars periodically dissipating to let Cage and Vega bridge the sections. The longest on Slip, it also features another unpredictable Capone guitar solo.

"Too Official" was described by Ruggeri as grabbing "the listener from its opening guitar riff". Anselmi noted that the track had "a shiny quality that offsets the anxiousness of 'Baphomet'", and wrote that it "blazes an aural swath with its straight-ahead attack". The album closes with "Transparent", which Wiederhorn described as combining "chiming harmonics with tight riffs and open chords to create a roiling tempest". He noted that, like much of Quicksand's best material, the song "threatens to go hurtling off the rails, but never does". Ruggeri noted the track's lyrical metaphor of "treating your days like a countdown / Seconds pass by waiting just to blow up", while Anselmi remarked that the song "seems to convey optimism, but, because it's Quicksand, is actually a middle finger topped with a smartass grin".

== Critical reception ==
Professional ratings
Contemporary reviews
Review scores
Source	Rating
The Boston Phoenix	2.5/4 stars
Chicago Tribune	2.5/4 stars
Entertainment Weekly	B
Metal Hammer	5/5
The Philadelphia Inquirer	3.5/4 stars

Slip received generally positive reviews upon release. Writing for the Star-Gazette, Lincoln Ellis stated that "the first 10 seconds" of Slip proved Quicksand had "become masters in the art of loud, grungy, noise rock", praising the precision of their performance as a defining strength. He contrasted this with the perceived sloppiness of many noise-oriented bands, concluding that "the smells coming out of Quicksand's kitchen do more than tantalize, they satisfy." Bill Pahnelas of the Richmond Times-Dispatch wrote that although Schreifels' vocals were "more emotion-wracked and frantic than decipherable", Quicksand "sound[ed] convincing" due to "the crisp interplay of a pair of guitars and a chunky rhythm section".

Some critics were more divided. Simon Ashberry writing for the Telegraph & Argus described Slip as "an intriguing blend of old-style hardcore American rock and the kind of air-brushed distortion which has become the hallmark of the Nirvana generation". He wrote that Quicksand were "bursting with ideas", but that their sound "seems hampered by doubt over whether they actually want to make the all-out gritted teeth approach or add a more commercial sheen". The Chicago Tribune's Brenda Herrmann wrote that Quicksand's "hard-core sound gets sunk in the same trap as Henry Rollins—their wordiness ends up bogging down the music". She noted that "when the melodies and feelings come together, it works", but added that "too many songs, especially 'Freezing Process' and 'Unfulfilled', simply become bass beats set to rhythmless ranting".

=== Retrospective assessments ===
Professional ratings
Review scores
Source	Rating
AllMusic	4/5 stars
Collector's Guide to Heavy Metal	6/10
The Encyclopedia of Popular Music	4/5 stars
laut.de	5/5 stars
Pitchfork	9.3/10
Punknews.org	5/5 stars

Over time, Slip has been widely praised in retrospective assessments. Alex Deller of the BBC described it as "a 40-minute master class in post-hardcore perfection". Writing for Punknews.org, Bryne Yancey noted that the album "still completely rips" despite its age, and called it "probably the best non-Fugazi post-hardcore record ever released". Matt Terich of Treble emphasized the album's scope, stating that "every track on Slip has a host of musical surprises", and characterized it as both "a genre album and a genre-defining album". He wrote that while it delivers "early '90s post-hardcore, screamy, rock awesomeness", it does so "with devastating originality". Kevin Ruggeri of Pitchfork similarly highlighted its individuality, calling Slip "a remarkable album" that demonstrated Quicksand had "a unique voice to offer to the world of music, regardless of category".

The album is included in Decibel magazine's Hall of Fame.

=== Accolades ===
Publication	Country	Accolade	Year	Rank
Metal Hammer	United Kingdom	The 10 essential post-hardcore albums	2022	8
Treble	United States	10 Essential '90s Post-Hardcore Albums	2012	*

* denotes an unordered list

== Track listing ==
All tracks are written by Quicksand, except where noted.

No.	Title	Length
1.	"Fazer"	3:13
2.	"Head to Wall"	3:03
3.	"Dine Alone"	3:27
4.	"Slip"	2:21
5.	"Freezing Process"	3:19
6.	"Lie and Wait"	2:32
7.	"Unfulfilled"	3:23
8.	"Can Opener"	3:39
9.	"Omission"	2:33
10.	"Baphomet" (Instrumental)	4:42
11.	"Too Official"	2:48
12.	"Transparent"	4:04
Total length:		39:04

Bonus track
No.	Title	Writer(s)	Length
13.	"How Soon Is Now?" (The Smiths cover)	Steven Morrissey, Johnny Marr	3:05
Total length:			42:09

== Personnel ==
Album credits as adapted from Artistdirect

Quicksand

- Walter Schreifels – vocals, guitar
- Tom Capone – guitar
- Sergio Vega – bass
- Alan Cage – drums

Production

- Steven Haigler – producer, mixing, engineer
- Don Fury – producer, engineer
- Andrew Smith – assistant engineer
- Fran Flannery – assistant engineer
- Mike Thompson – assistant engineer
- Edward Douglas – assistant engineer
- Jesse Henderson – assistant engineer
- George Marino – remastering

Artwork

- Alex Brown – cover art concept
- John Mockus – photography
- Phil Yarnall – design
