= Interiors (Quicksand album) =

Studio album by Quicksand
- Released: November 10, 2017
- Recorded: 2016–2017
- Studio: Studio 4, Conshohocken, Pennsylvania
- Genres: Post-hardcore, hard rock, space rock, post-grunge
- Length: 41:05
- Label: Epitaph
- Producer: Will Yip

Quicksand chronology
Manic Compression (1995)	Interiors (2017)	Triptych Continuum (2018)

Singles from Interiors
- 1. "Illuminant" Released: August 22, 2017; 2. "Cosmonauts" Released: October 3, 2017

Professional ratings
Aggregate scores
Source	Rating
Metacritic	77/100
Review scores
Source	Rating
AllMusic	4/5 stars
Alternative Press	4.5/5 stars
Consequence of Sound	B
Metal Hammer	4/5 stars
Punknews.org	4/5 stars
Stereogum	Positive

Interiors is the third album by American post-hardcore band Quicksand, released on November 10, 2017. It is the band's first studio album since Manic Compression (1995), and their first release on Epitaph Records.

== History ==
Quicksand first disbanded in October 1995, about eight months after the release of Manic Compression, because of internal conflicts. However, the band reunited in 1997, and spent most of the following year writing new material and embarking on their first tour in three years. In August 1998, they entered Carriage House Studios in Stamford, Connecticut with producer Steven Haigler to begin recording their third album. After touring North America with Deftones and Snapcase from September to November 1998, Quicksand returned to the studio to continue working on the follow-up Manic Compression; despite a successful tour and a more collaborative effort in the writing process, resurfaced tensions would eventually split up the band indefinitely in late 1999 and doom the material to remain officially unreleased. Eight tracks from the sessions later surfaced online unofficially; however, none of them appeared on Interiors.

Speculation about new music from Quicksand surfaced in July 2013 when the band posted a photo from the studio, which was later deleted. Asked in July 2017 if it was true that they were working on new material, frontman Walter Schreifels responded, "Can't confirm or deny."

On August 21, 2017, Quicksand's Twitter feed and Walter Schreifels' Instagram account teased the title of their third album Interiors, to be released later in 2017 on Epitaph, with a 30-second video clip. On the following day, the band streamed their first single in 22 years, "Illuminant", and announced that the album would be released on November 10, 2017.

== Track listing ==
All songs written by Alan Cage, Walter Schreifels, and Sergio Vega.

No.	Title	Length
1.	"Illuminant"	3:53
2.	"Under the Screw"	2:56
3.	"Warm and Low"	3:48
4.	">"	0:47
5.	"Cosmonauts"	4:09
6.	"Interiors"	4:58
7.	"Hyperion"	4:34
8.	"Fire This Time"	3:23
9.	"Feels Like a Weight Has Been Lifted"	3:35
10.	">>"	1:37
11.	"Sick Mind"	3:12
12.	"Normal Love"	4:16

== Personnel ==
Personnel per booklet.

Quicksand

- Walter Schreifels – vocals, guitars
- Sergio Vega – bass
- Alan Cage – drums, percussion
- Tom Capone – guitars*

*Despite Tom Capone being listed in the album's booklet, it was later revealed that he had no contributions on the album.

Production

- Will Yip – producer, mixing, sound engineer
- Vince Ratti – mixing
- Ryan Smith – mastering
- Justin Anstotz – assistant engineer
- Jay Preston – assistant engineer
- Amy Grantham – artwork
- Jason Link – layout

== Charts ==
Chart (2017)	Peak position
Belgian Albums (Ultratop Flanders)	141
US Billboard 200	142
US Independent Albums (Billboard)	7
US Top Alternative Albums (Billboard)	9
US Top Rock Albums (Billboard)	18
