= Manic Compression =

Studio album by Quicksand
- Released: February 24, 1995
- Studios: Sorcerer Sound (New York City, New York); Don Fury's Studio (New York City, New York)
- Genres: Post-hardcore; emo; alternative metal
- Length: 38:26; 45:04 (Japan)
- Label: Island
- Producers: Wharton Tiers; Don Fury

Quicksand chronology
Slip (1993)	Manic Compression (1995)	Interiors (2017)

Singles from Manic Compression
- 1. "Divorce" Released: 1994; 2. "Delusional" Released: 1995; 3. "Thorn in My Side" Released: April 3, 1995 (Note: A limited edition 7-inch vinyl split single with "Thorn in My Side" and Stanford Prison Experiment's "You're the Vulgarian" was released later in 1995.); 4. "Landmine Spring" Released: July 17, 1995

Professional ratings
Review scores
Source	Rating
AllMusic	4.5/5 stars
Collector's Guide to Heavy Metal	6/10
The Encyclopedia of Popular Music	3/5 stars
Kerrang!	4/5 stars

Manic Compression is the second studio album by American post-hardcore band Quicksand. It was first released on February 24, 1995 on vinyl through Revelation Records, before being given a widespread CD release through Island Records on February 28, 1995. The album influenced many post-hardcore and alternative metal bands. It peaked at number 135 on the Billboard 200.

It was Quicksand's last studio album before their initial breakup, leading to a 22-year gap in output until the release of Interiors, in 2017. In the meantime, a follow-up album was conceptualized during their brief 1997–1999 reunion, but it never materialized.

A vinyl version of the album was released in early 2013 by Shop Radio Cast. It incorrectly lists "Landmine Spring" as the first song on the B-side on the cover, when the song is the last song pressed on the A-side.

== Critical reception ==
The Encyclopedia of Popular Music called Manic Compression "another bracing collection of cerebral punk songs." Trouser Press wrote that "producers Wharton Tiers ... and Don Fury condense the sonics considerably on tracks like the writhing 'Divorce' and the brittle 'Thorn in My Side.'"

== Track listing ==
All tracks are written by Quicksand.

No.	Title	Length
1.	"Backward"	1:43
2.	"Delusional"	4:05
3.	"Divorce"	1:44
4.	"Simpleton"	2:35
5.	"Skinny (It's Overflowing)"	2:27
6.	"Thorn in My Side"	2:37
7.	"Landmine Spring"	3:21
8.	"Blister"	2:30
9.	"Brown Gargantuan"	4:04
10.	"East 3rd St."	4:01
11.	"Supergenius"	2:52
12.	"It Would Be Cooler If You Did"	6:27
Total length:		38:26

Japanese bonus tracks
No.	Title	Length
12.	"Shovel"	3:07
13.	"Voice Killer"	3:31
Total length:		45:04

== Personnel ==
- Quicksand
  - Walter Schreifels – guitar, vocals
  - Tom Capone – guitar
  - Sergio Vega – bass
  - Alan Cage – drums
- George Marino – mastering
- Don Fury – production (1, 2, 4–6, 9), mixing
- Wharton Tiers – production (3, 7, 8, 10–14)
- Melinda Beck – illustration
- Joseph Cultice – photography
- Satoru Igarashi – design
