= Walter Schreifels =

American rock musician

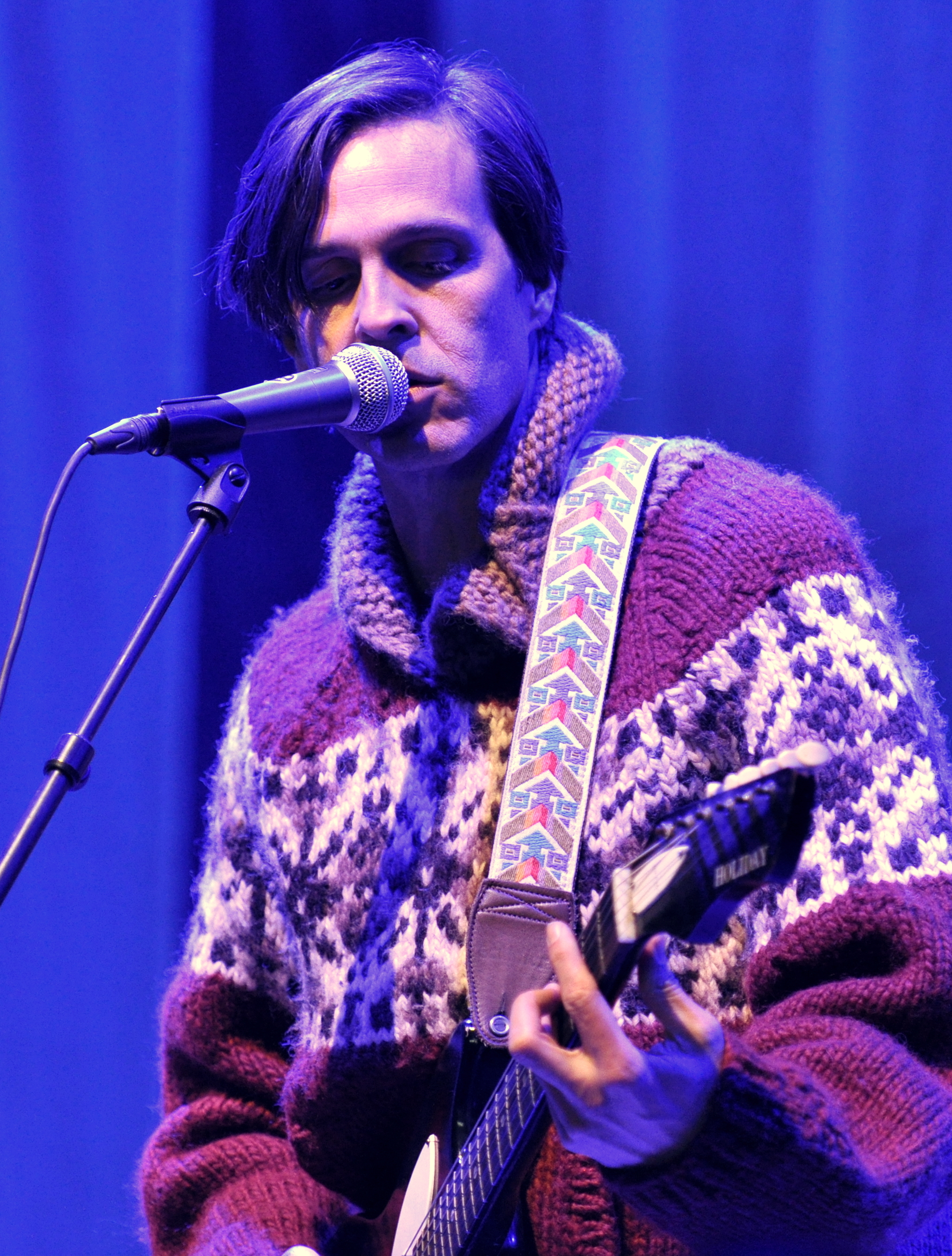
- Schreifels performing at Groezrock 2013

Background information
- Born: March 10, 1969 (age 57); New York City, U.S.
- Genres: Hardcore punk, post-hardcore, alternative rock, alternative metal
- Occupations: Musician, record producer
- Instruments: Vocals, guitar, bass guitar, piano
- Years active: 1985–present
- Label: Big Scary Monsters
- Member of: Youth of Today, Gorilla Biscuits, Quicksand, Rival Schools, Walking Concert, Dead Heavens
- Formerly of: CIV, Vanishing Life, Moon Dog, World's Fastest Car, Walter and the Motorcycles

Walter Arthur Schreifels (born March 10, 1969) is an American rock musician from New York City.

== Career ==
In the late 1980s, he played in many New York hardcore bands, most notably Youth of Today and Gorilla Biscuits, where he was also the songwriter and lyricist. After Gorilla Biscuits broke up, he formed the short-lived Moondog, releasing only a bootleg 7" record. Moondog would transition into the more aggressive post-hardcore band Quicksand. Quicksand went on hiatus in the late nineties. He also collaborated with his former Gorilla Biscuits bandmates in the melodic hardcore band CIV, writing much of their first LP and one song on their follow-up LP despite not actually playing on the record. He went on to start World's Fastest Car, a relatively short-lived project. The band recorded a demo and an EP, neither of which have been officially released. The EP was supposed to be released by Revelation Records, but that never came to fruition due to their breakup. Later, he helped create the melodic indie rock-styled band Rival Schools. After Rival Schools' dissolution, he went on to form Walter and the Motorcycles, who recorded but never released a self-titled LP and played a few shows but quickly broke up. Walking Concert, his next project, was heavily influenced by classic British acts such as Elvis Costello, The Kinks, Syd Barrett, David Bowie and The Smiths. In addition to a new solo acoustic LP scheduled for release in 2008, Schreifels reformed Rival Schools in June 2008 with plans to release a new album. In October 2009, he appeared on "Memoria: A Tribute to the Alternative 90s" (Yr Letter Records) with "When You Sleep", a My Bloody Valentine cover. In 2014, Schreifels joined a blues rock band that would come to be known as Dead Heavens.

On November 16, 2010, Rival Schools released the deluxe single for "Shot After Shot" on iTunes from the forthcoming record Pedals, which was released in March 2011.

As a producer, he has worked with such hardcore-related bands as Hot Water Music, Sinch, The First Step and Title Fight. He produced the EP Deer Strutter, the first from the UK band Cars As Weapons, and a full length titled Days Above Ground from Australian post-hardcore band, Paper Arms. He is also part owner of the record label Some Records. He produced hardcore/pop punk act Title Fight's first full length titled Shed.

=== Solo ===
On May 4, 2010, Schreifels released his first solo album, An Open Letter to the Scene, on Big Scary Monsters Recording Company (UK), Academy Fight Song (U.S.), Dine Alone Records (Canada) and Arctic Rodeo (Europe). In support of the album release, Schreifels announced a 12-date UK tour. The album features 10 tracks on CD and 11 on vinyl, including covers of songs by Agnostic Front, CIV, and My Bloody Valentine (vinyl version only). The CIV song he covered, "Don't Gotta Prove It", was written by Schreifels.

In an interview with Alter the Press!, Schreifels confirmed his follow-up solo record was 85% complete and would be titled Jesus Is My Favorite Beatle.

== Discography ==
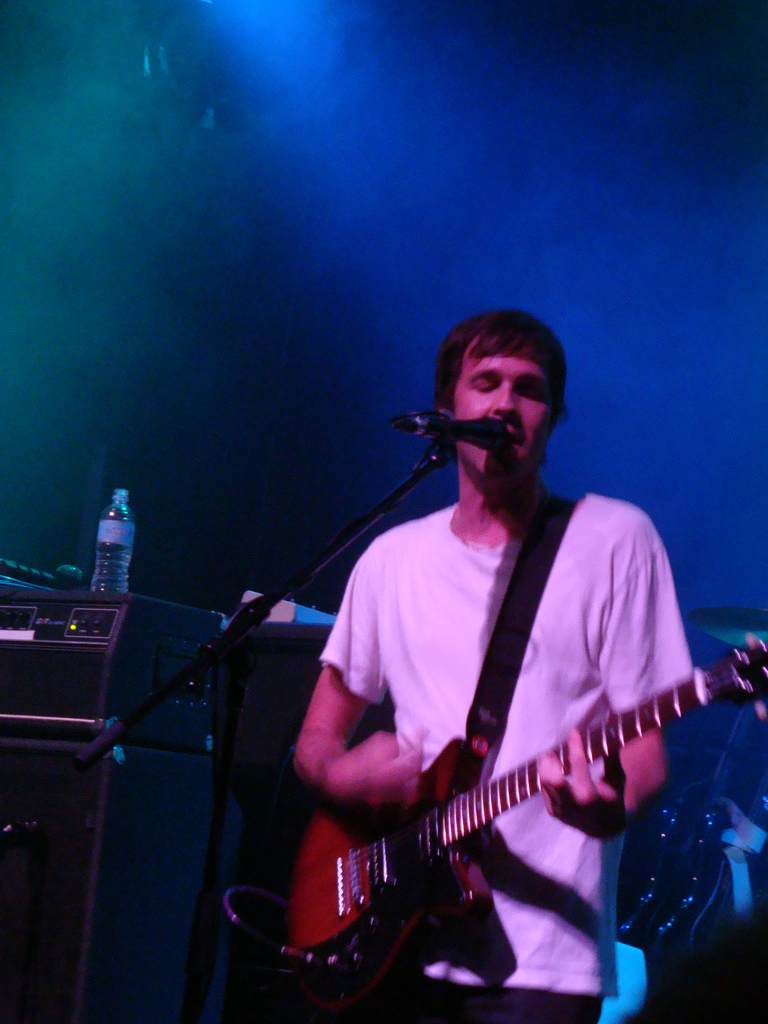
Schreifels in 2009

=== With Gorilla Biscuits ===
- Gorilla Biscuits (1988, Revelation Records)
- Start Today (1989, Revelation Records)

=== With Youth of Today ===
- We're Not in This Alone (1986 Wishing Well Records/ 1988 Revelation Records)
- Disengage (1990 Revelation Records)

=== With Quicksand ===
- Quicksand (EP, 1990, Revelation Records)
- Slip (1993, Polydor)
- Manic Compression (1995, Island Records)
- Interiors (2017, Epitaph Records)
- Distant Populations (2021, Epitaph Records)
- Bring On The Physics (2026, Equal Vision Records)

=== With Rival Schools ===
- United by Fate (2001, Island Records)
- Pedals (2011, Photo Finish Records)
- Found (2013, Shop Radio Cast)

=== With Walking Concert ===
- Run to Be Born (2004, Arctic Rodeo Recordings)

=== As Walter Schreifels ===
- An Open Letter to the Scene (2010, Arctic Rodeo Recordings)

=== With Vanishing Life ===
- Surveillance (2016, Dine Alone Records)

=== With Dead Heavens ===
- Whatever Witch You Are (2017, Dine Alone Records)

== Guest Appearances ==
- Fall Out Boy – "Doomsday Generation (Slacker for the Ages)" (2026) (featuring Walter Schreifels)
