= Luke Ebbin =

American songwriter

- Genres: Hard rock, punk rock, pop
- Occupations: Songwriter, record producer

Luke Ebbin is a former American multi-platinum, five time Grammy-nominated record producer, composer and songwriter. Ebbin is credited for executing the comeback and extreme makeover of Bon Jovi with his production of the hit "It's My Life" and the 11 million selling album Crush. He is currently a real estate agent in Montecito and Santa Barbara, California.

== Musical career ==
When Ebbin was 16, he and his brother went to see the Pat Metheny Group. While talking with the front of house engineer, Ebbin mentioned that he was a drummer and the engineer asked if Ebbin was interested in becoming the band's drum technician for the tour. Ebbin then spent the summer on the road in what he described as "the modern jazz version of Almost Famous".

While studying music at Denison University, the college offered a program that encouraged off campus internships for school credit during the month of January. Ebbin called Power Station Studios in New York City, and asked the studio manager about an internship. Helped by Metheny being recording at the studio that same moment, Ebbin was hired, and spent the month "gofering" for artists such as The Rolling Stones, Eric Clapton, Cyndi Lauper, and James Taylor. Ebbin graduated in 1989, and afterwards was managing Sigma Sound in New York City. During his off hours he produced a band he was part of, "and came to realize that I liked that side of the glass better." From there Ebbin began working with NYC bands, with his first full record being for funk band The Second Step. Columbia Records A&R executives James Diener and Josh Sarubin started hiring Ebbin to produce acts they had development deals with, Ebbin's first major label release being with the band Splender.

Diener introduced Ebbin to the legendary A&R man, John Kalodner, and Kalodner in turn recommended Ebbin to Jon Bon Jovi when he asked an "up and coming producer" for Bon Jovi's next album. Ebbin produced Bon Jovi's Crush (2000), and reunited with the band in 2002's Bounce, as well as being one of the producers on their live album One Wild Night Live 1985-2001.

After his work with Bon Jovi, Ebbin produced the critically acclaimed album United By Fate for the post-hardcore band, Rival Schools. Ebbin wrote with Tom Higgenson of the Plain White T's on their hit record "Hey There Delilah", and has produced and/or written with Melissa Etheridge (one Grammy nomination), the All-American Rejects, will.i.am, Wakefield, The Dan Band, and Summercamp. He has also written and produced the TV themes for The Insider, Entertainment Tonight, the 1998 Nagano Olympics on CBS, and The Sports Illustrated Swimsuit Videos among others. Ebbin also served as music supervisor, fashion show DJ, music editor, and composer for Polo Ralph Lauren.

Most recently Ebbin has been writing and producing with Richie Sambora for his third solo album Aftermath of the Lowdown, Australian singer Shannon Noll's latest release on Sony BMG, Australian singer Renee Cassar's debut release on Island Australia, and developing independent artist Danielle Barbe. He has also recently worked with Alicia Keys and the EDM wunderkind, Zedd.

Ebbin was also an internet entrepreneur having co-founded the artist development platform Music180.com in 2010, and his own music consulting company, Mechanism Strategic, in 2011.

After seeing success renovating and selling properties in Los Angeles and Montecito, Ebbin's friends asked him to represent them in their real estate transactions. Eventually he opted to work full-time with real estate.

== Discography ==
See Category:Albums produced by Luke Ebbin for a partial discography
