= Sergio Vega (bassist) =

American rock musician (born 1970)

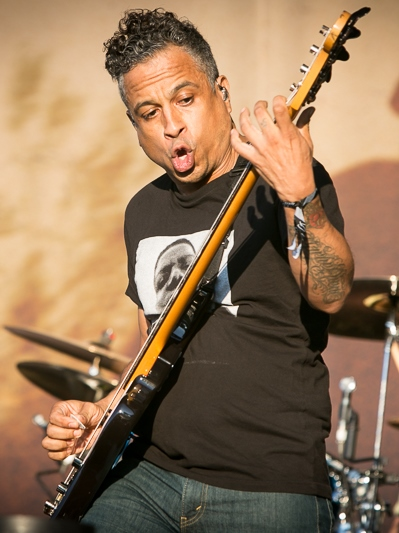
- Vega performing with Deftones at Zürich Openair in 2013

Background information
- Born: August 25, 1970 (age 55); The Bronx, New York, U.S.
- Genres: Post-hardcore; alternative metal
- Occupation: Musician
- Instrument: Bass guitar
- Years active: 1988–present
- Member of: Quicksand
- Formerly of: Deftones

Sergio Vega (born August 25, 1970) is an American musician. He is the bassist of post-hardcore band Quicksand, former bassist of alternative metal band Deftones, and a solo artist.

Vega has been a member of Quicksand since 1990 and appears on all releases including Slip (1993) and Manic Compression (1995). He began playing with Deftones in 2009, replacing Chi Cheng. He appeared on four albums with Deftones: Diamond Eyes (2010), Koi No Yokan (2012), Gore (2016) and Ohms (2020) until departing the band in early 2021.

== Biography ==
In 1988, Vega became the bass player for a New York hardcore band Collapse. Collapse released a demo and contributed a track on the 1988 New Breed cassette compilation released by Freddy Alva of Wardance Records. In 1989, Vega replaced Alan Peters (ex-Agnostic Front bassist) in the New York hardcore band Absolution.

In 1990, Vega was instrumental in forming the new post-hardcore band Quicksand; at the time Vega was a prominent bassist of the genre. Quicksand released their debut album, Slip, in February 1993. In February 1995, Quicksand released their second album, Manic Compression. Later that year, Quicksand disbanded, and Vega began to DJ around New York City and Japan. The band reunited briefly in 1997 and toured with Deftones the next year. After this tour, the band desired to write a followup to Manic Compression, although tensions between bandmates caused the band to split up permanently. In 1999, when Deftones bassist Chi Cheng was unable to perform onstage during a Deftones tour due to a toe surgery, Vega filled in for him on bass.

In addition to his career with Quicksand and Deftones, Vega has released solo material. He released his first solo EP entitled The Ray Martin Sessions through the indie record label grapeOS in 2000. Vega's solo work was more similar to melodic pop-rock of The Beatles than his heavier hardcore- and metal-based work in Quicksand and Deftones. The EP was well received by critics; the success of The Ray Martin Sessions allowed Vega to tour the US and UK. He toured with former Orange 9mm/Helmet guitarist Chris Traynor, musician/fashion model Sibyl Buck, and Charlie Walker (Split Lip) on drums. The band Champions of Sound was formed as an off-shoot of Vega's solo project, and they produced a self-released a gate-fold 7" EP, as well as an unreleased full length record, Champion Love, with the participation of numerous former members of the NYC hardcore and post-hardcore scene.

In November 2008, Deftones bassist Chi Cheng was seriously injured in a car accident in Santa Clara, California, and entered a coma-like state following the accident. Vega played in Chi's place at Bamboozle Left with Deftones, and continued to fill in for him as Cheng's condition remained the same. When his accident occurred, Deftones had just finished writing and recording songs for what was to be their sixth studio-album, Eros, although they decided to shelve the album indefinitely. This decision was made due to Cheng's condition, and also was a creative decision, as the band stated that they didn't feel that Eros "best encompassed who they were currently as people or as musicians". Deftones began writing a new album from scratch in June 2009 with Vega on bass. The album, titled Diamond Eyes, was released in May 2010. In November 2012, the group released their second album with Vega, titled Koi No Yokan. According to Deftones frontman Chino Moreno, Vega made a bigger contribution to Koi No Yokan than he did to Diamond Eyes.

In June 2012, Vega and Quicksand would secretly reunite to play a surprise set at Revelation Records' 25th anniversary show. This performance was followed by an appearance on the Jimmy Fallon Show as well as two headlining shows at The Bowery Ballroom and The Music Hall of Williamsburg in August 2012. Quicksand would later act as one of the headliners at California's FYF set. In January 2013, Quicksand embarked on their first tour since the late 1990s. They released their third album, Interiors, in November 2017. The band released their fourth full-length album, Distant Populations, in 2021.

On March 9, 2022, Vega announced in an Instagram post that he had departed from Deftones. In a video explaining his departure, he cited a contract dispute as the reason for leaving, saying, "Our respective management had a conversation to discuss a new contract, and they offered me the same deal... At that point, it was clear there was no opportunity for growth for me. So I declined the offer. And then I called the guys immediately to see where the miscommunication was to resolve it, but there was no response. A couple of days later, I received an email from their lawyer that their offer was withdrawn, and that they wished me the best."

None of the band members has made an official statement regarding Vega's departure. In July 2022, Crosses member and Moreno's close personal friend Shaun Lopez commented on the matter during a podcast, saying that the departure was a culmination of Vega not raising the issue earlier, the COVID-19 pandemic, and Carpenter's unwillingness to travel. Lopez said the stress caused by the pandemic made it an inappropriate time to address the contract. He also stated that the day after Vega posted the video online, Moreno was furious and decided not to comment, believing that doing so might make the situation worse.

Vega follows a vegan lifestyle.

== Equipment ==
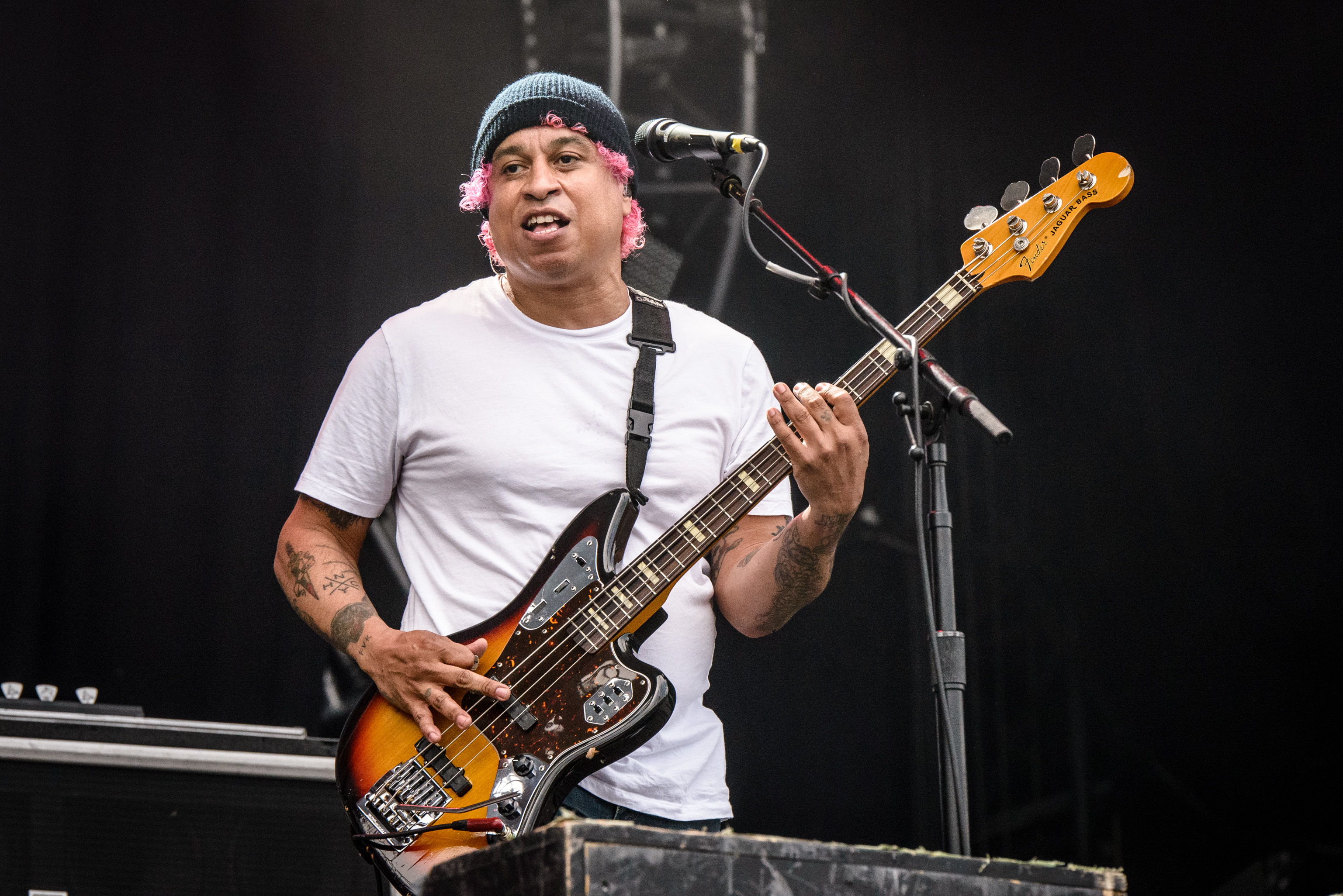
Vega performing with Deftones at Rock im Park, June 2016

With Quicksand, Vega played a variety of basses. For his first two albums after joining Deftones, Vega used Fender Jaguar Basses exclusively (tuned CGCF, C#G#C#F#, Drop D, or standard E, depending on the song). For his third album with the band, Gore, Vega used a Fender Bass VI on several tracks such as "Hearts/Wires". Unlike Chi Cheng, who was a fingerstyle player, Vega plays bass with a pick.

His amplifier is an Ampeg SVT Classic Reissue. His effects include Native Instruments Guitar Rig 3 software and a Tech 21 SansAmp Bass Driver DI. According to the Fractal Audio Facebook page, Vega is also using the Axe-FX Ultra Preamp. His rig was completely changed in 2013, with the Fractal Axe-FX II being the main unit for his sounds, along with a Matrix GT1000FX power amp and 2 Orange 8x10 speaker cabinets for amplification.

== Discography ==
=== Solo ===
- The Ray Martin Sessions (2000, Grape OS)
- Fxxxxxk It (2014)
- Hotel Life (2014)

=== With Quicksand ===
- Slip (1993, Polydor)
- Manic Compression (1995, Island)
- Interiors (2017, Epitaph)
- Distant Populations (2021, Epitaph)
- Bring On The Psychics (2026, Equal Vision Records)

=== With Deftones ===
- Diamond Eyes (2010, Warner Bros./Reprise)
- Koi No Yokan (2012, Warner Bros./Reprise)
- Gore (2016, Warner Bros./Reprise)
- Ohms (2020, Warner Bros./Reprise)
