= Walking Concert =

- Genres: Indie rock
- Years active: 2003–present
- Label: Some Records
- Members: Walter Schreifels; Ryan Stratton; Jeffery E. Johnson; Drew Thomas

Walking Concert is an indie rock band from New York City, featuring Walter Schreifels on vocals and guitar, Jeffery E. Johnson on guitar, Ryan Stratton on bass guitar, and Drew Thomas on drums.

The band takes its name from the line "Boy, you're gonna be a Walking Concert!", spoken by a music store clerk to Ralph Macchio's character in the 1986 film, Crossroads.

== Discography ==
=== Studio albums ===
- Run to Be Born (2004)
