= Maintain (album) =

Studio album by downset.
- Released: June 10, 2022
- Recorded: March – June 2021
- Genre: Rapcore
- Length: 36:31
- Label: Nuclear Blast
- Producer: Nick Jett; Rogelio "Roy" Lozano

Downset. chronology
One Blood (2014)	Maintain (2022)

Singles from Maintain
- 1. "The Place To Be" Released: April 29, 2022

Maintain is the sixth studio album by American rapcore band downset. It was released on June 10, 2022, and is their first album on Nuclear Blast Records. It is the band's first album to feature bassist Phillip Gonzales and drummer Bobby Blood.

== Background ==
In March 2020, downset. began to create a four-song demo. However, due to the COVID-19 pandemic, the studio closed and meant the band's demos were trapped in the studio for three months. After restrictions lifted, the band was able to finish the demos. Upon receiving the demo, the band's manager at the time, Scott Koenig, shopped the demos around to Nuclear Blast, and helped negotiate a deal with the label in summer 2021, which guirarist Rogelino Lozano called "a great deal on an awesome label."

== Recording and composition ==
After doing some pre-production at Downtown LA Rehearsal Studios (owned by Chris Poland), the band set to work in the studio with Terror drummer Nick Jett, with recording taking a total of three months. The band envisioned Maintain as a return to roots album and wanted to capture a vibe similar to their early demo singles, involving the band down-tuning their guitars to Drop-C in the vein of the band's 1994 self-titled debut album. The band also recorded the album with digital recording techniques for the first time.

Maintain was lyrically inspired by the band's difficulties during the pandemic, and the album title was based on the perseverance of the band during this time, according to Lozano. "During pre-production, “Maintain” was the first song that we plucked out of the air. Going through hard times you've got to hang in there, hang on, MAINTAIN and hold it down. During the first wave of the pandemic, we had a lot of fear. Everyone was getting sick, people were dying like our manager Scott Koenig (RIP). It was amazing that we were able to pull all the work off that we did for this album through lockdown.”

"The Place To Be" was one the first songs written by the band with Bobby Blood and Phillip Gonzales. The song's lyrics were explained by Roy Lozano; “The lyrics to this song combine several subjects into one song and at the end all tying in together. Represent yourself with class, responsibility and courage. Setting a good example for our youth is my interpretation of the message.”

== Release and promotion ==
In January 2022, downset. began teasing the release of new material on their social media accounts. On February 18, 2022, the band publicly announced their signing to Nuclear Blast Records, as well as reissues of the band's early seven-inch singles "Anger / Ritual" and "About Ta Blast".

On April 29, 2022, downset. announced the release of Maintain, with a release date of June 10, 2022. The album's first single, "The Place To Be", was released the same day.

== Track listing ==
All tracks are written by downset. and Nick Jett

No.	Title	Length
1.	"Maintain"	2:56
2.	"The Blackest of Days"	2:48
3.	"New Respect"	2:11
4.	"Won't Forget"	3:07
5.	"Wreck It"	3:24
6.	"On Lock (Only The Defest)"	3:24
7.	"The Place To Be"	3:45
8.	"Your Power"	2:41
9.	"Positive Mind"	3:05
10.	"Hear Me Now"	2:42
11.	"Deeper"	3:49
12.	"Ready For This"	2:36
Total length:		36:31

== Personnel ==
downset.

- Rey Oropeza - Vocals
- Rogelio Lozano - Guitar, production
- Phillip Gonzales - Bass guitar
- Bobby Blood - Drums

Production

- Nick Jett - production, engineering
- Howie Weinberg - mastering
