= Downset =

Downset may refer to:

- Downset lattice
- Down set
- Downset., an American rap metal band
- downset., the 1994 self-titled debut studio album
- "Downset", the title track of the self-titled 1994 album by downset.
