= List of people who follow a straight edge lifestyle =

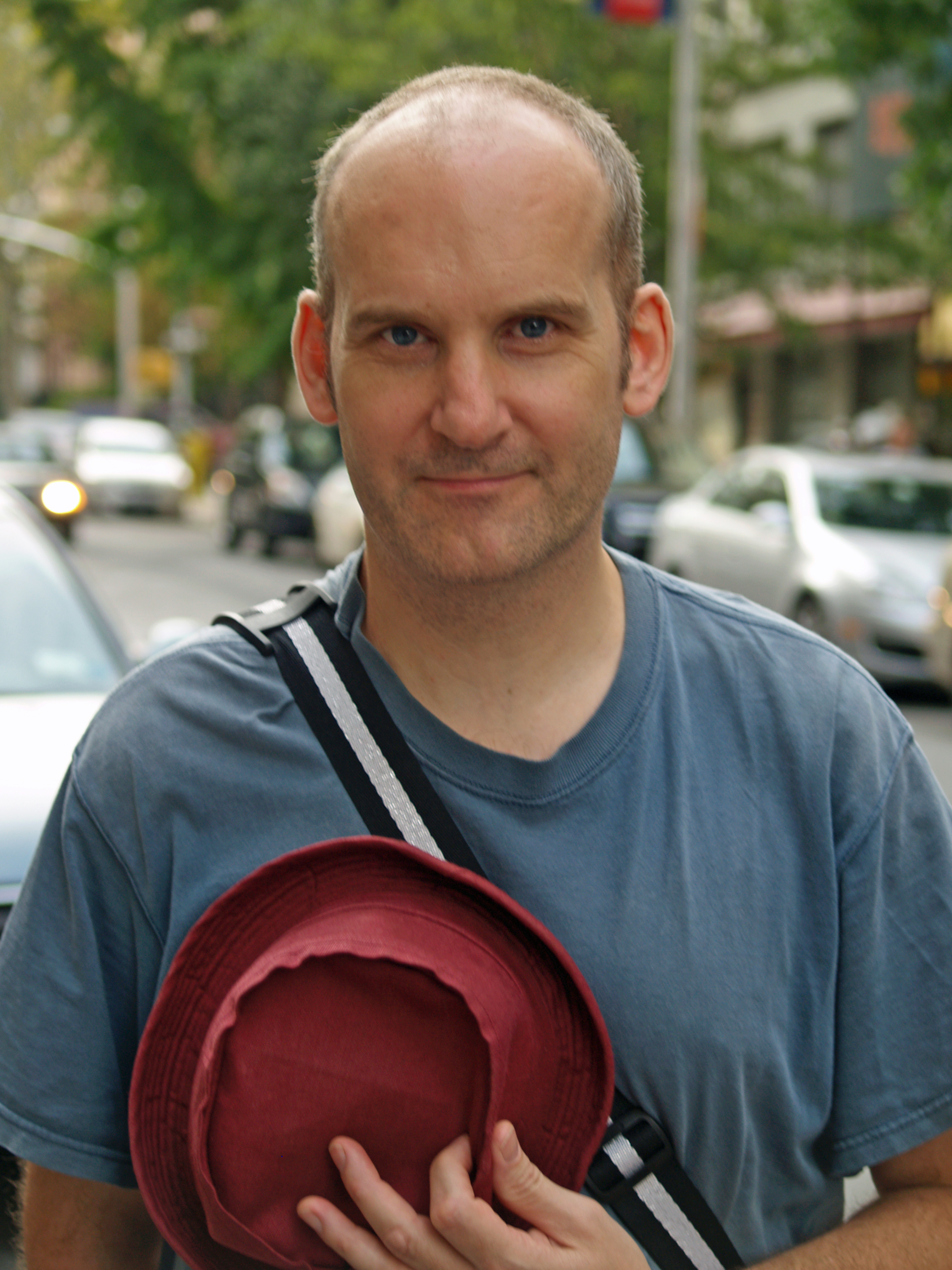
Minor Threat and Fugazi frontman Ian MacKaye, credited as creator of the term "straight edge"

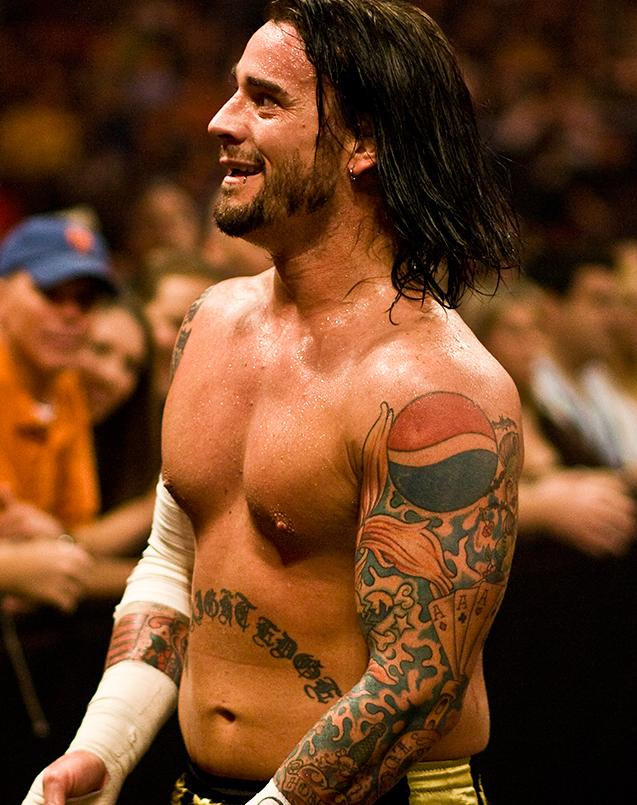
Pro wrestler and MMA fighter CM Punk

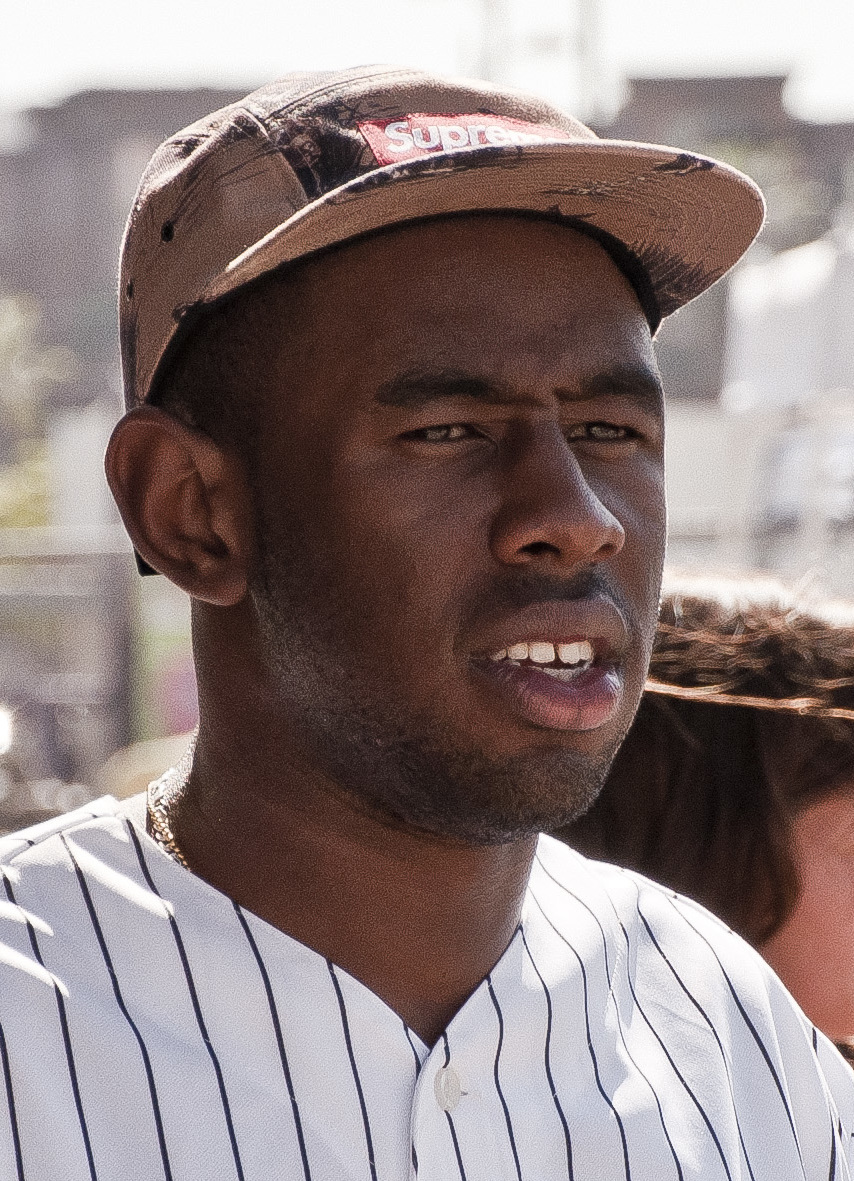
Rapper and producer Tyler, the Creator

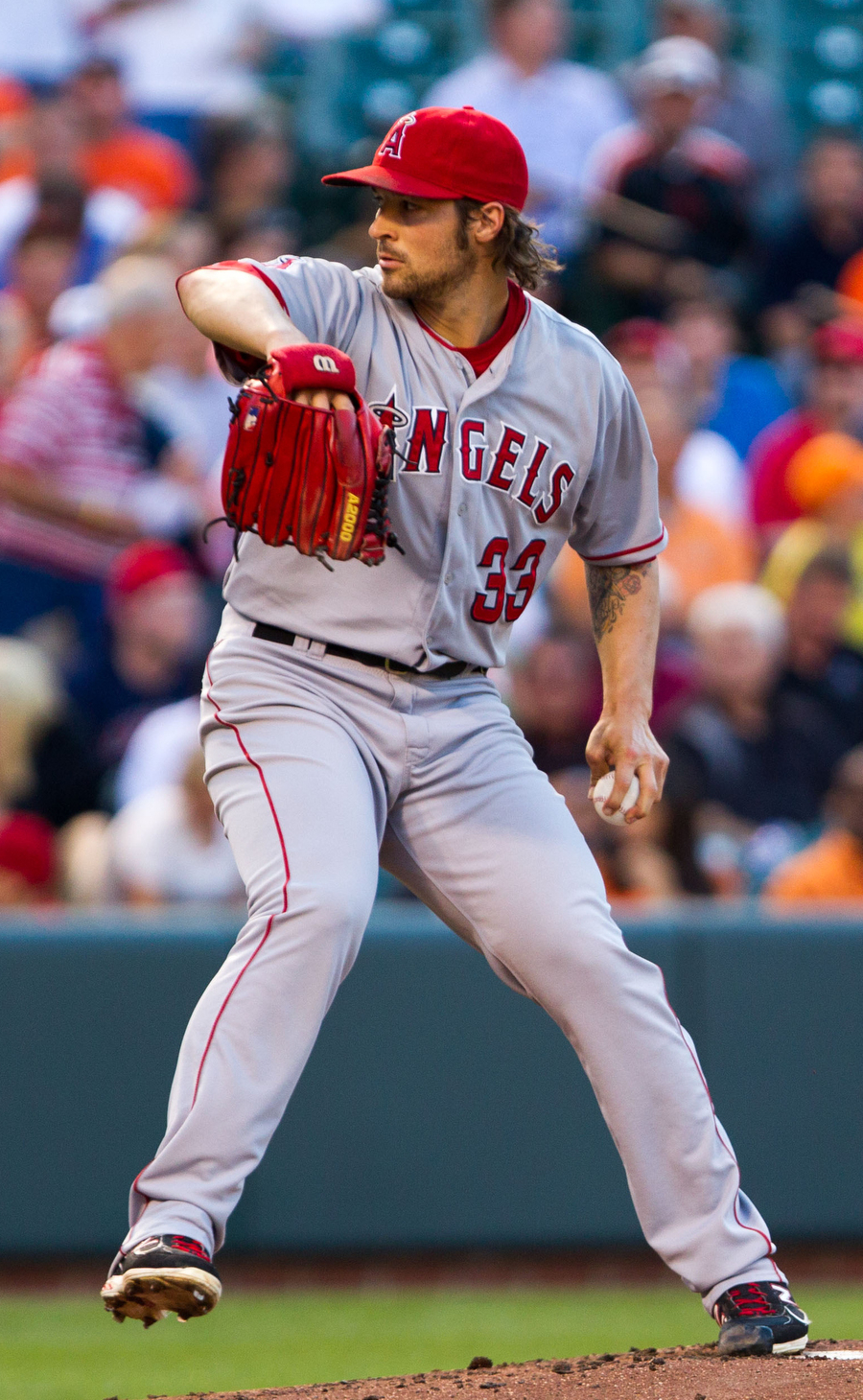
Pitcher C. J. Wilson

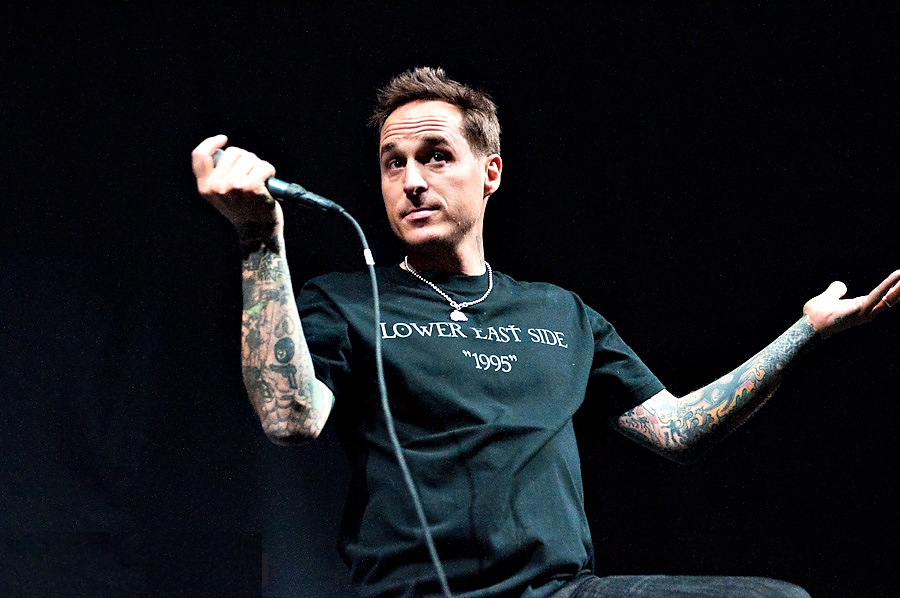
H_{2}O frontman Toby Morse

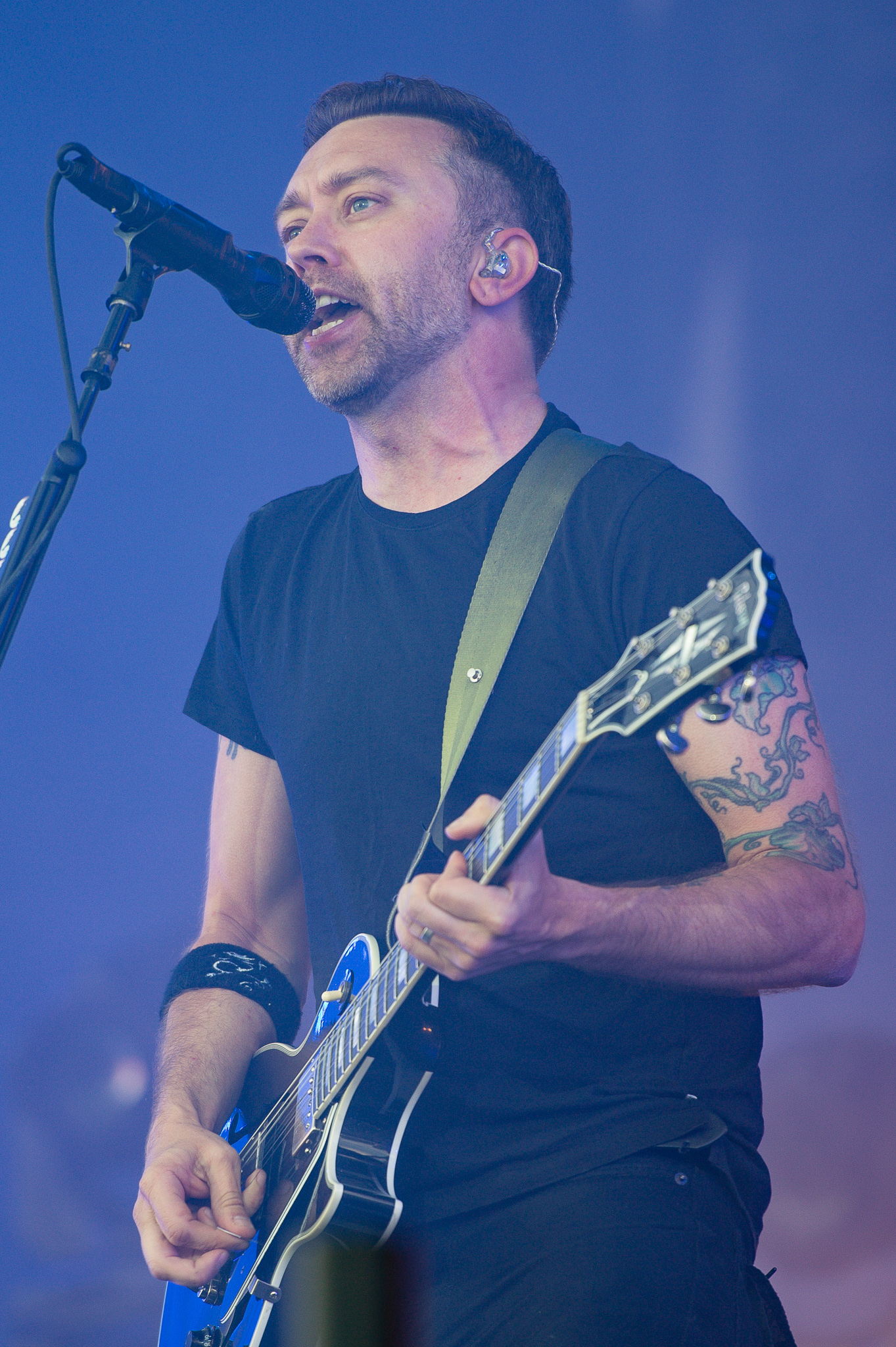
Rise Against Frontman Tim McIlrath

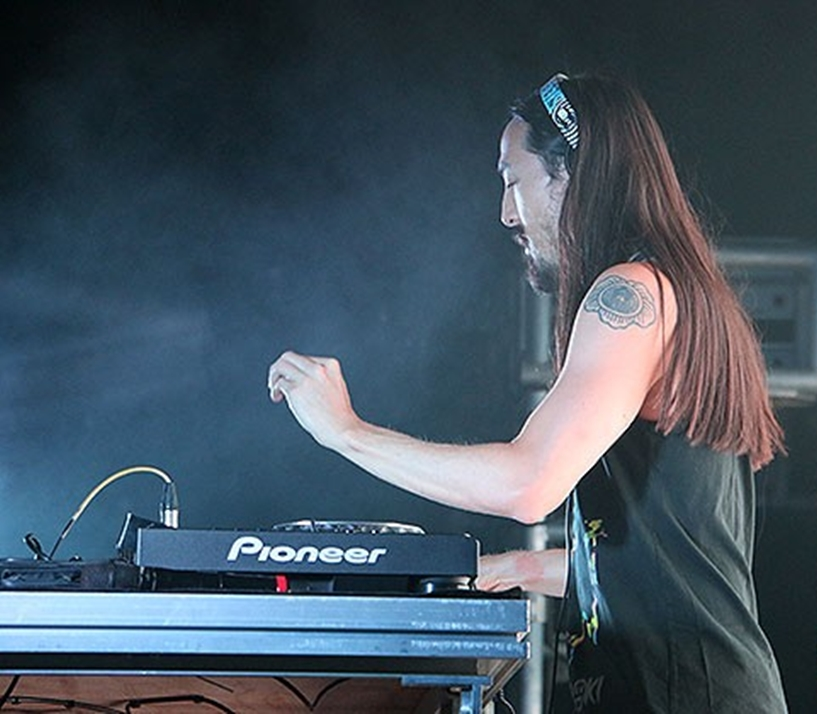
Electro house musician and producer Steve Aoki

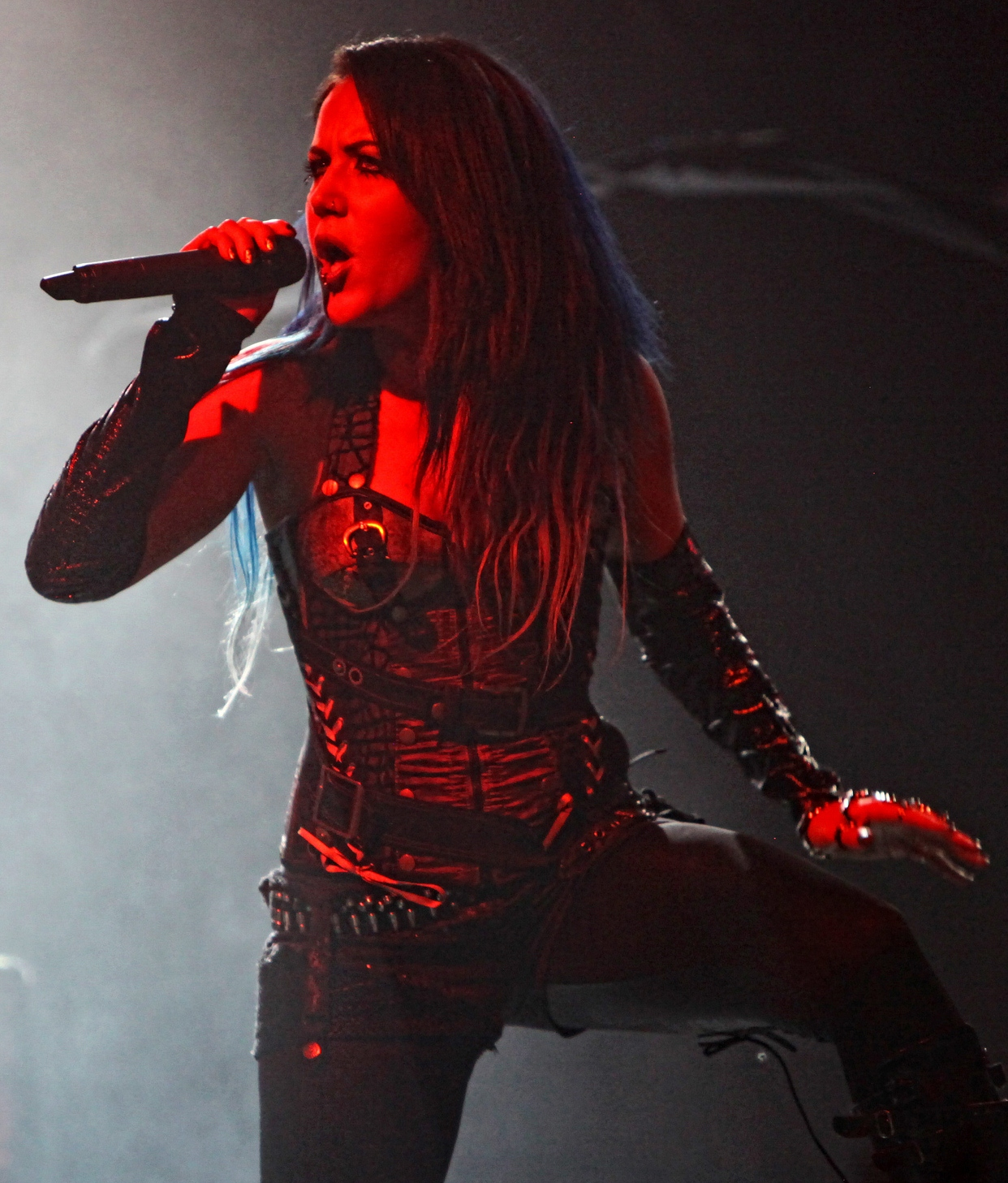
Arch Enemy lead singer Alissa White-Gluz

This is a list of notable people who follow the straight edge lifestyle. Straight edge is a subculture and subgenre of hardcore punk whose adherents refrain from using alcohol, tobacco, and other recreational/non-prescribed drugs. It was a direct reaction to the sexual revolution, hedonism, and excess associated with punk rock. For some, this extends to not engaging in promiscuous sex, following a vegetarian or vegan diet, and not using caffeine or prescription drugs.

== List of straight edge people ==
| Aaron Bedard | Lead singer of Bane. |
| Aaron Dalbec | Guitarist for Bane and Only Crime, former member of Converge. |
| Aaron North | Guitarist. |
| Alec Empire | German musician who is best known as a founding member of the band Atari Teenage Riot. |
| Alejandro Aranda | American singer and songwriter, also known as Scarypoolparty. |
| Alissa White-Gluz | Canadian vocalist. |
| Andy Hurley | Drummer for American pop punk band Fall Out Boy. |
| Anthony Fantano | American music reviewer. |
| Austin Theory | American professional wrestler. |
| Awsten Knight | Lead singer of Waterparks. |
| Beau Bokan | American singer best known as the frontman of post-hardcore band Blessthefall. |
| Ben Myers | English writer and journalist. |
| Bif Naked | Canadian singer, actress and motivational speaker. |
| Billie Eilish | American singer and songwriter. |
| Blake Lively | American actress. |
| Bobby Blood | Filmmaker, drummer for metalcore bands First Blood and Merauder. |
| Brett Ratner | Film director, film producer, screenwriter, film editor, and music video director. |
| Brody King | Professional wrestler and vocalist for hardcore band God's Hate. |
| C. J. Wilson | Former professional baseball pitcher. |
| Carah Faye Charnow | Vocalist for indie rock band Shiny Toy Guns. |
| Chad Gilbert | Founder, lead guitarist and backing vocalist for punk rock band New Found Glory. |
| Christy Mack | Nude model, feature dancer, and former pornographic actress. |
| CM Punk | Professional wrestler and mixed martial artist. |
| Curtis Lepore | Bass player and Vegan Athlete. |
| Dan Askew | Founder of Second Nature Recordings. |
| Dan Briggs | Bassist for progressive metal band Between the Buried and Me. |
| Dan "Soupy" Campbell | Lead singer for pop punk band The Wonder Years. |
| Danny Wylde | Writer, musician, filmmaker, and a former pornographic actor. |
| Dan Smith | New Zealander tattooist and musician, founder of the rock band The Dear & Departed. |
| Daniel Andreas San Diego | American domestic terrorist and animal liberationist. |
| Darby Allin | American professional wrestler. |
| Dave Peters | Vocalist for groove metal band Throwdown. |
| Davey Havok | Lead vocalist for punk rock band AFI. |
| Denzel Curry | American rapper, singer, and songwriter. |
| Derek Youngsma | American drummer for the metalcore band Bleeding Through. |
| Doyle Wolfgang von Frankenstein | Guitarist for the horror punk band the Misfits. |
| Elgin James | American filmmaker, musician, founder of the street gang Friends Stand United. |
| Emma Ledgerwood | Legendary Tonya and Lead singer of W-9. |
| Fred Mascherino | Lead vocalist and guitarist of the band The Color Fred. |
| Front Porch Step | Pseudonymous of Jake Mcelfresh, acoustic and pop rock musician. |
| Gabriel Kuhn | Political writer, author and translator. Author of the book X: Straight Edge and Radical Sobriety. |
| Gail Greenwood | Bassist for bands like Belly and L7. |
| George Stroumboulopoulos | Canadian television and radio personality. |
| Glen E. Friedman | Photographer, artist and political activist. |
| Greg Graffin | Musician, college lecturer, and author mostly known for the band Bad Religion. |
| Hal Sparks | Actor, comedian, musician and television personality. |
| Hanson | Professional wrestler. |
| Howard Jones | Vocalist. |
| Ian MacKaye | Frontman of post-hardcore band Fugazi and of the hardcore punk band Minor Threat. |
| J Mascis | Singer, guitarist and main songwriter of alternative rock band Dinosaur Jr. |
| Jacob Bannon | Vocalist, lyricist, and graphic artist for the American metalcore band Converge. |
| Jade Puget | Lead guitarist for punk rock band AFI. |
| James Hart | Lead vocalist for hardcore/metalcore band Eighteen Visions and Burn Halo. |
| Jamie Thomas | Skateboarder and owner and founder of Zero Skateboards. |
| Jason Shrout | Drummer for multiple bands as Eighteen Visions and Trial. |
| Jeff Tuttle | Musician and filmmaker, former guitarist of mathcore band The Dillinger Escape Plan. |
| Jeremy Bolm | Vocalist of post hardcore band Touché Amoré. |
| Jeremy McKinnon | Vocalist of metalcore band A Day to Remember. |
| Jim Norton | American comedian and actor. |
| Jim Smallman | British stand-up comedian, wrestling promoter, radio presenter and voiceover artist. |
| Jinder Mahal | Canadian professional wrestler. |
| Joe Mulherin | Musician who performs under the name Nothing,Nowhere and filmmaker. |
| Joe Principe | Founder, bassist and backing vocalist for the punk rock band Rise Against. |
| John 5 | Guitarist. |
| John Pettibone | Vocalist. |
| Jona Weinhofen | Lead guitarist for Australian melodic metalcore band I Killed the Prom Queen. |
| Jonathan Pollak | Israeli activist against the Israeli West Bank barrier. |
| Jonathan Vigil | Vocalist and founding member of metalcore band The Ghost Inside. |
| Jonny McBee | Founding member for experimental band The Browning and former singer for As Blood Runs Black. |
| JT Woodruff | Vocalist and rhythm guitarist for the rock band Hawthorne Heights. |
| Justin Beck | Musician and businessman, guitarist for Glassjaw. |
| Karl Buechner | Metalcore musician, vocalist for bands Earth Crisis, Freya and Path of Resistance. |
| Kaskade | American DJ, record producer and remixer. |
| Keiji Haino | Japanese musician. |
| Kenny Omega | Canadian professional wrestler. |
| Kent McClard | Record label owner and zine publisher from Goleta, California. |
| Kimya Dawson | Singer-songwriter, best known as a solo performer and as one half of The Moldy Peaches. |
| Kurt Ballou | Musician and producer, best known as the guitarist from Converge. |
| Lee Chung-Yong | South Korean professional soccer player. |
| Lee Gaze | Former lead guitarist for Welsh rock band Lostprophets and lead guitarist for No Devotion. |
| Liam Cormier | Lead vocalist of metalcore band Cancer Bats and metal supergroup AxeWound. |
| Mat Bruso | Vocalist for hardcore punk band Bury Your Dead. |
| Matt Cross | Professional wrestler. |
| Matt Fox | Lead guitarist for American hardcore punk band Shai Hulud. |
| Matt Jackson | Professional wrestler, member of The Young Bucks. |
| Mat Kerekes | Musician, best known as the frontman of the rock band Citizen. |
| Matt Mentley | Bassist for groove metal band Throwdown. |
| Matt Saincome | Journalist and satirist. |
| MC Lars | American post-punk laptop rapper. |
| Merzbow | Japanese noise musician. |
| Michael Crafter | Australian vocalist for metalcore band Confession. |
| MickDeth (Mick Morris) | Former bassist for alternative metal band Eighteen Visions. |
| Mike Lewis | Former rhythm guitarist for Welsh rock band Lostprophets and No Devotion. |
| Milo Ventimiglia | American actor. |
| Moshe Kasher | Stand-up comedian, writer, and actor. |
| My Summer as a Salvation Soldier | Pseudonym of Þórir Georg Jónsson, Icelandic singer-songwriter. |
| Nate Newton | Musician. |
| Nathan Aké | Dutch professional soccer player. |
| Nick Jackson | Professional wrestler, member of The Young Bucks. |
| Nick Jett | Drummer for hardcore punk band Terror. |
| Noah Kin | Finnish-Nigerian alternative rapper and producer. |
| Noah Levine | American Buddhist teacher. |
| Palmer Luckey | American entrepreneur, founder of Oculus VR and designer of the Oculus Rift. |
| Pandie James | New Zealand-born writer, actress and producer. |
| Patty Walters | Lead vocalist for the British rock band As It Is and YouTuber. |
| Paul Baribeau | Folk punk singer. |
| Paul Koehler | Drummer and founding member of Canadian post-hardcore band Silverstein. |
| Paul Waggoner | Guitarist for progressive metal band Between the Buried and Me. |
| Penn Jillette | Magician, comedian, actor and best-selling author. |
| Peter Daniel Young | American animal rights activist. |
| Raymond "Raybeez" Barbieri | Frontman and leader of hardcore punk band Warzone. He became straight edge after years of alcohol and drug use. |
| Raymond Rowe | Professional wrestler. |
| Russ Rankin | Singer for punk rock band Good Riddance. |
| Sage Francis | Rapper and spoken word poet. |
| Shannon Lucas | Former drummer for bands The Black Dahlia Murder and All That Remains. |
| Showyousuck | Rapper. |
| Sibylle Berg | German-Swiss author and playwright. |
| Soko | French indie pop singer-songwriter. |
| Steve Aoki | Electro house musician, record producer, and music executive. |
| Tarjei Strøm | Drummer for the Norwegian bands Datarock and Ralph Myerz and the Jack Herren Band. |
| Tecia Torres | Puerto Rican-American mixed martial artist. |
| Tim McIlrath | Founder, rhythm guitarist, songwriter and lead vocalist for the American punk rock band Rise Against. |
| Title Fight | Rock band where all members, Jamie Rhoden, Ned Russin, Shane Moran and Ben Russin, follow a straight edge lifestyle. |
| Toby Morse | Musician and motivational speaker, best known as the vocalist for punk rock band H_{2}O. |
| Tommy Giles Rogers, Jr. | Vocalist and keyboard player of progressive metal band Between the Buried and Me. |
| Tuomas Saukkonen | Multi instrumentalist and founder of the former Finnish extreme metal band Before the Dawn. |
| Tyler, The Creator | American rapper, producer and actor. |
| UltraMantis Black | Musician and former professional wrestler. |
| Varg Vikernes | Norwegian musician. |
| Vince Staples | American rapper. |
| Vincent Bennett | Vocalist and only remaining founding member of deathcore band The Acacia Strain and Cockpunch!. |
| Walt Flanagan | Podcaster and comic book artist. |
| Wesley Eisold | Musician, poet and author. He records music under the name Cold Cave. |
| White Town | British-Indian singer and musician. |
| Zach Blair | Lead guitarist and backing vocalist for the punk rock band Rise Against. |
| Zerocalcare | Italian cartoonist. |

== List of former straight edge people ==
| Name | Notes |
|---|---|
| Aaron Bruno | Vocalist and founder for electronic rock band Awolnation. |
| Adam Dutkiewicz | Guitarist for metalcore band Killswitch Engage. |
| Alex Garcia-Rivera | Drummer. |
| Alexander Tucker | English musician. |
| Barney Greenway | Vocalist for extreme metal band Napalm Death. |
| Brandan Schieppati | Vocalist for metalcore band Bleeding Through and former guitarist for Throwdown |
| Cedric Bixler-Zavala | Vocalist for rock bands The Mars Volta, At the Drive-In, and Antemasque. |
| Chris Wollard | Singer and guitarist for the punk rock band Hot Water Music. |
| Damian Abraham | Vocalist for hardcore punk band Fucked Up. |
| Dan Marsala | Lead vocalist for the band Story of the Year. |
| Dana DeArmond | American pornographic actress and director. |
| Daniel O'Sullivan | English musician. |
| Daryl Palumbo | Lead vocalist for Glassjaw and Head Automatica. |
| Dave Smalley | Singer for the hardcore punk bands DYS, Dag Nasty, All, and Down by Law. |
| Dennis Lyxzén | Lead vocalist for Swedish hardcore punk band Refused. |
| Derek Brown | Entrepreneur, writer and mixologist. |
| Drew Daniel | Electronic musician and English professor, member of Matmos and The Soft Pink Truth. |
| Dominic Landolina | Guitarist for the bands Code Orange and Adventures. |
| Dwid Hellion | Vocalist and founder of hardcore punk band Integrity. |
| Erik Petersen | Founder of the DIY anarcho-punk band Mischief Brew. |
| Frank Carter | Vocalist formerly of Gallows and Pure Love, now of Frank Carter & the Rattlesnakes. |
| Frank Turner | Solo artist and former singer with Million Dead. |
| Grant Morrison | Scottish comic book writer, playwright, and occultist. |
| Greg Anderson | American musician, co-founder of Southern Lord Records. |
| Harley Flanagan | Founding member and former bassist of the crossover thrash band Cro-Mags. |
| Ian Watkins | Former musician and lead singer of the rock band Lostprophets and convicted child sex offender. |
| J. R. Hayes | Vocalist for grindcore band Pig Destroyer. |
| Jamie Bissonnette | Chef. |
| Jocko Willink | Retired Navy Seal and podcast host. |
| Jonah Ray | American actor, comedian and writer from Los Angeles. |
| John Stabb | Punk rock vocalist and frontman, best known as the founding member of Government Issue. |
| Jonathan Anastas | Bassist for hardcore punk bands DYS and Slapshot. |
| Julien Baker | American indie rock singer and guitarist best known as a member of Boygenius. |
| Justice Tripp | American musician best known as the vocalist of Trapped Under Ice and Angel Dust. |
| Justin Young | English musician, lead singer and guitarist of indie rock band The Vaccines. |
| Keith Buckley | Vocalist and lyricist of the metalcore band Every Time I Die. |
| Kim Jones | English fashion designer. |
| Kim Schifino | Drummer of the indie dance duo Matt and Kim. |
| Lil Yachty | American rapper. |
| Mark Arm | Vocalist for the grunge band Mudhoney. |
| Matt Heafy | Guitarist and lead vocalist of heavy metal band Trivium. |
| Mike Hranica | Vocalist for metalcore band The Devil Wears Prada. |
| Mike Schleibaum | Guitarist for melodic death metal band Darkest Hour. |
| Mitch Lucker | Former vocalist for deathcore band Suicide Silence. |
| Bert McCracken | Vocalist for the Used. |
| Moby | Singer-songwriter, musician, DJ and photographer. |
| Omar Rodríguez-López | American musician, producer, writer, actor and film director. |
| Oscar Isaac | Actor and musician. |
| Ovidie | French director, producer, journalist, writer, and a former feminist pornographic actress. |
| Pete Wentz | Bassist, primary lyricist and backing vocalist for the band Fall Out Boy. |
| Ray Cappo | Vocalist for the hardcore punk band Youth of Today. |
| Sean Ingram | Musician and entrepreneur, frontman of metalcore band Coalesce. |
| Seth Rollins | Professional wrestler and actor. |
| Shaun Lopez | Music producer, composer, and musician. |
| Steve Turner | Guitarist for the grunge band Mudhoney. |
| Vinnie Caruana | Vocalist for punk band The Movielife and indie band I Am the Avalanche. |
| Walter Schreifels | Musician and producer of bands like Youth of Today and Gorilla Biscuits. |
| Zack de la Rocha | Lead vocalist for Rage Against the Machine. |

== See also ==
- List of notable teetotalers
- List of straight edge bands
- List of vegetarians
- List of vegans
