= The Place to Be =

The Place to Be may refer to:

- The Place to Be (Junior Cook album)
- The Place to Be (Benny Green album)
- Place to Be (album), 2009 jazz piano album by Hiromi Uehara
- Place to Be (film), drama film directed by Kornél Mundruczó
- "Place to Be", a song from the 1972 album Pink Moon by Nick Drake
- "The Place To Be", a song from the 2022 album Maintain by downset.
