= List of straight edge bands =

The following is a list of bands that have been associated with the straight edge subculture. Note that not all of these bands have or had all straight edge members, and some of them stopped identifying as such at some point during their careers.

== List of straight edge bands ==
| Band | Years active | Origin | Country | Other views or scenes | Source |
|---|---|---|---|---|---|
| 7 Seconds | 1980–present | Reno, Nevada | United States | | |
| Abhinanda | 1992–1999, 2004, 2009–2010, 2012 | Umeå | Sweden | | |
| ACxDC | 2003-2017 | Los Angeles, California | United States | Veganism, Satanism | |
| AFI | 1991–present | Ukiah, California | United States | Veganism | |
| Arma Angelus | 1998–2002 | Chicago, Illinois | United States | | |
| Asunto | 1995–present | Santiago | Chile | Veganism | |
| Bane | 1995-2016 | Worcester, Massachusetts | United States | | |
| Battery | 1990–1998, 2012, 2017 | Washington, D.C. | United States | | |
| Big Cheese | 2016–present | Leeds | U.K. | | |
| Bishop | 2004-2017 | Fort Lauderdale, Florida | United States | | |
| Bold | 1986–1993, 2005-2007, 2012, 2014-2015 | New York (Bedford, Westchester County) | United States | | |
| Blacklisted | 2003–present | Philadelphia, Pennsylvania | United States | | |
| Call to Preserve | 2003–2011, 2014 | Rockledge, Florida | United States | Christianity | |
| Casey Jones | 2003-2012 | Jacksonville, Florida | United States | | |
| Chain of Strength | 1988–1991, 2012 | Southern California, California | United States | | |
| Champion | 1999–2006 | Seattle, Washington | United States | | |
| Chokehold | 1990-1996, 2015, 2017 | Hamilton, Ontario | Canada | Veganism | |
| Clear | 1995-2000 | Salt Lake City, Utah | United States | | |
| Deadlock | 1997–present | Schwarzenfeld | Germany | Veganism | |
| The Dillinger Escape Plan | 1997–2017 | Morris Plains, New Jersey | United States | | |
| Down to Nothing | 2000–present | Richmond, Virginia | United States | | |
| DYS | 1981-1985, 2010–present | Boston, Massachusetts | United States | | |
| Earth Crisis | 1989–2001, 2007–present | Syracuse, New York | United States | Veganism | |
| Eighteen Visions | 1995–2007, 2017–present | Orange County, California | United States | | |
| Embrace Today | 1998-2006 | Boston, Massachusetts | United States | | |
| Final Exit | 1994–1997, 2007, 2012 | Umeå | Sweden | | |
| First Blood | 2002–present | San Francisco, California | United States | Veganism | |
| Good Clean Fun | 1997–present | Washington, D.C. | United States | Veganism | |
| Good Riddance | 1986–2007, 2012–present | Santa Cruz, California | United States | | |
| Gorilla Biscuits | 1987–1991, 1997, 2005–present | New York City, New York | United States | | |
| Government Issue | 1980–1989 | Washington, D.C. | United States | | |
| Harm's Way | 2006–present | Chicago, Illinois | United States | | |
| Have Heart | 2002-2009 | New Bedford, Massachusetts | United States | | |
| In My Eyes | 1997–2000 | Boston, Massachusetts | United States | | |
| Indecision | 1993–2000, 2006–present | Brooklyn, New York | United States | | |
| Inside Out | 1988–1991 | Orange County, California | United States | | |
| Judge | 1987–1991, 2013–present | New York City, New York | United States | | |
| Kublai Khan Tx | 2009-present | Sherman, Texas | United States | | |
| Lärm | 1981–1987, 2003-2012 | Amersfoort | Netherlands | Anarcho-communism | |
| Liferuiner | 2004–present | Toronto, Ontario | Canada | | |
| Limp Wrist | 1998–present | Albany, New York | United States | Queercore | |
| Locked Inside | 2019–present | New York City, New York | United States | | |
| Manliftingbanner | 1990-1993, 1998, 2008, 2012 | Haarlem | Netherlands | Communism | |
| Maroon | 1998-2014 | Nordhausen | Germany | Veganism | |
| Martha | 2011–present | County Durham | England | Queer, anarchism, veganism | |
| MC Lars | 1998–present | Oakland, California | United States | Christianity, veganism | |
| Minor Threat | 1980-1983 | Washington, D.C. | United States | | |
| Morning Again | 1995-1999 | Fort Lauderdale, Florida | United States | Veganism | |
| Most Precious Blood | 2001–present | Brooklyn, New York | United States | Vegetarianism, veganism | |
| Mouthpiece | 1991–1996 | New Jersey | United States | | |
| Negative FX | 1981-19?? | Boston, Massachusetts | United States | | |
| No For An Answer | 1987–1989, 2009–present | Orange County, California | United States | | |
| No Cure | 2021-present | Birmingham, Alabama | United States | | |
| One King Down | 1994-2001 | Albany, New York | United States | Vegetarianism, veganism | |
| Over My Dead Body | 2000-20? | San Diego, California | United States | | |
| Point of No Return | 1996-2006 | São Paulo | Brazil | Veganism | |
| Prayer for Cleansing | 1996-2000, 2003-2004 | Raleigh, North Carolina | United States | Veganism | |
| Project X | 1987-1989, 2015 | New York City, New York | United States | | |
| Purified in Blood | 2003-2007, 2008–present | Hommersåk | Norway | Veganism | |
| R.A.M.B.O. | 1999-2007 | Philadelphia, Pennsylvania | United States | Anarchism | |
| Racetraitor | 1996-1999, 2016, 2017 | Chicago, Illinois | United States | Anti-racism | |
| Raid | 1989-1993 | Memphis, Tennessee | United States | Hardline, veganism | |
| Refused | 1991–1998, 2012, 2014–present | Umeå | Sweden | Veganism, socialism, anarchism | |
| Sect | 2015–present | Raleigh, North Carolina Portland, Oregon Toronto, Ontario | United States Canada | Veganism | |
| Slapshot | 1985–present | Boston, Massachusetts | United States | | |
| Sons of Abraham | 1994–1998 | Long Island, New York | United States | Judaism | |
| Snapcase | 1991–2005, 2007, 2010–present | Buffalo, New York | United States | | |
| SSD | 1981-1985 | Boston, Massachusetts | United States | | |
| Step Forward | 1989-1991 | Umeå | Sweden | | |
| Strife | 1991–1999, 2001–present | Los Angeles, California | United States | | |
| Silverstein | 2000 - present | **Burlington** | Canada | vegetarian | |
| Ten Yard Fight | 1995-1999 | Boston, Massachusetts | United States | | |
| The Faith | 1981-1983 | Washington, D.C. | United States | | |
| The Geeks | 1999–present | Seoul | South Korea | | |
| The Red Baron | 2004-2009 | West Palm Beach, Florida | United States | Christianity | |
| The Teen Idles | 1979–1980 | Washington, D.C. | United States | | |
| Throwdown | 1997–present | Orange County, California | United States | | |
| Title Fight | 2003–present | Kingston, Pennsylvania | United States | | |
| Trial | 1995–present | Seattle, Washington | United States | | |
| Turning Point | 1988–1991, 1994, 2016-present | New Jersey | United States | | |
| Unbroken | 1991–1995, 1998, 2010-2012, 2014–present | San Diego, California | United States | | |
| Undertow | 1991–2004 | Seattle, Washington | United States | | |
| Uniform Choice | 1982-? | Orange County, California | United States | | |
| Up Front | 1987–1992, 1997–1999, 2005, 2009-2010 | New York City, New York | United States | | |
| Vegan Reich | 1988-1993, 1996, 1999 | Laguna Beach, California | United States | Hardline, veganism | |
| Verse | 2003–2009, 2011–2013 | Providence, Rhode Island | United States | | |
| Vitamin X | 1997–present | Amsterdam | Netherlands | | |
| Warzone | 1983–1997 | Manhattan, New York | United States | Skinhead | |
| Wisdom in Chains | 2002—present | Stroudsburg, Pennsylvania | United States | | |
| xDeathstarx | 2002–2009, 2015–present | Redland, California | United States | Christianity | |
| xLooking Forwardx | 1999–present | Bel Air, Maryland | United States | Christianity | |
| XTRMST | 2014–present | Los Angeles, California | United States | | |
| Youth Attack | 2002-2006 | Worcester, Massachusetts | United States | | |
| Youth of Today | 1985–1990, 1994, 1999, 2003-2004, 2010–present | Danbury, Connecticut | United States | Vegetarianism | |

== See also ==
- List of people who follow a straight edge lifestyle
