= Devious =

Devious may refer to:

- Deviation (disambiguation)
- Devious (novel), the ninth book in The It Girl series by Cecily von Ziegesar
- "Devious" Diesel, a character in the television series Thomas and Friends
- Devious (Doctor Who), a fan-made Doctor Who story
- Devious (band), a metal band from the Netherlands
