= Discrepancy =

Discrepancy may refer to:

== Mathematics ==
- Discrepancy of a sequence
- Discrepancy theory in structural modelling
- Discrepancy of hypergraphs, an area of discrepancy theory
- Discrepancy (algebraic geometry)

== Statistics ==
- Discrepancy function in the context of structural equation models
- Deviance (statistics)
- Deviation (statistics)
- Divergence (statistics)

== See also ==
- Deviance (disambiguation)
- Deviation (disambiguation)
