= Asunto =

Chilean hardcore metal band

- Also known as: xASUNTOx
- Origin: Santiago, Chile
- Genres: hardcore metal; melodic death metal; hardcore punk
- Years active: 1995–present
- Labels: Ahimsa, Survival, En Tus Venas, Decisión
- Members: Raúl Jiménez; Mitchel Aedo; Miguel Verdejo; Claudio Hernandez; Pedro Sabanovich
- Past members: Andrés Urzua; Raúl Santana; Frank Millard; Paulo Cornejo; Rodrigo Godoy; Fernando Arteaga González; Ignacio Jiménez; Ignacio Bielefeldt; Nicolas Guajardo
- Website: Facebook

Asunto (also known as xASUNTOx, which means "Issue" in Spanish) is a hardcore metal band formed in 1995 in Santiago, Chile. Pioneers in the South American hardcore scene.

== History ==
Formed by the two brothers Raúl and Ignacio Jiménez, Mitchel Aedo and Andrés Urzua, Asunto is a process creation that starts to show his results at the beginning of 1995 and 1996. The main idea was to show another alternative to everything that was known at that time, giving and showing a new way to be and live against the capitalism, trying to give a coherent and drug-free message, with a vegan straight edge attitude. Talking about Asunto is not only to talk about a hardcore straight edge band; it's also to talk about the beginning and the history of straight edge in Chile.

In 1997, they recorded their first demo-tape totally auto produced, and it's distributed at their shows. That same year they were invited to play in Buenos Aires (Argentina), to play in the South American Animal Liberation Fest, where they played with other South American bands. While in Chile, little by little, it became to birth and built a hardcore straight edge scene.

In February 1998, they recorded their first album called No Te Dejes Derrotar with a fusion of old and new school hardcore sounds. After this, they continued playing weekly in a strong growth scene. In the month of July, they played at Mendoza (Argentina).

In 1999, Asunto recorded their new EP called Renacer at the HYT studios with the engineer Carlos Torres, and was masterized in France by Sebastian Lhoro and David Mancilla (Stormcore, Overcome Records). The album Renacer, with a new school metalcore sound, was a classic element at that time to the Latin-American hardcore, and transformed as an inspiration to a hundreds of bands around the world. That same year Asunto played at Concepcion (south of Chile), and also in Buenos Aires (Argentina) again. Parallel that same year Raúl, Ignacio and Mitchel formed the band called XCUESTION DE RESPETOX, with Gonzalo Jiménez, Gonzalo Terán and Paulo Cornejo.

In 2000, Asunto started to play regularly at live shows and also started to edit compilatory material. At that time they came through a lot of changes in their initial band members and that's when Andrés (bass) leaves the band by personal choice and Paulo of XCUESTION DE RESPETOX took his place in Asunto.

In January 2001, Renacer was edited in CD format by 78 Life Records from Brazil. The album contained three unpublished songs: Tristeza 2000, Perseverancia and Mi Convicción.

In the beginning of 2002, Mitchel leaves Asunto, and Raúl Santana took his place. With this new formation they recorded a new album called Confrontación which was their consolidation in the metalcore sound scene. Because of some external issues the album was edited in the beginning of the year 2003 by Survival Records from Chile. Not so much time after that Mitchel came back to Asunto as a band member.

In the summer of 2003, Asunto played in São Paulo at The South American Hardcore Fest (Verdurada), with some auxiliary band members because some of their original could not travel to Brazil. Raúl Santana leaves the band by personal issues and Frank Millard took his place in the band.

In 2004, they played at hundreds of shows around the country. On December 13 the album Cuando Las Sutilezas Mueren was edited by En Tus Venas Records. This last album was the consolidation of Asunto in the international scene and also a renew sound for Chilean bands, fusing melodic death metal and hardcore.

In 2005, Frank leaves Asunto, and that's when Rodrigo Godoy took his place. In the middle of this year Asunto made a European Tour in fourteen countries, playing at twenty-five shows. Also took his final place in the Chilean musical scene, taking out of the underground the hardcore scene and promoting metalcore sound and the vegan straight edge movement. That year they made massive shows for over thousands people, playing with bands from other musical scenes.

In 2006, the compilatory album El Fuego Sigue Ardiendo was edited in México by Decision Personal Records. Thanks to the support that the record gave to them Asunto played in countries all over South America like México, Colombia and Perú to name a few. That same year they started to make and record new songs.

In 2007, Mitchel leaves the band and Frank came back to Asunto. With these current members they had a new tour in México. Their album Afirmación De Vida was edited at the same time by En Tus Venas Records (Chile), Decision Personal Records (México), Por Tu Capricho Mueren Records (México), Sin Fronteras Records (Colombia), and Dignify Records (Argentina). Asunto received the award to The Animalist Band of the Year by the two Chilean organizations: Actitud Animal and Federación Chilena de Instituciones de Protección Animal (Chilean Federation of Animal Protection Institutions).

In the present 2008, Asunto is waiting the edition of their new album Afirmación De Vida by labels from USA, Europe, Brazil, and Hong Kong. The band has also started the making process of their new material for their new album that will come alive at the end of this year.

The band has released five albums and has performed international tours.

== Band members ==
=== Current members ===
- Raúl Jiménez – lead vocals (1995–present)
- Mitchel Aedo – guitars (1995–2001, 2002–2007, 2012-2017, 2018–present)
- Miguel Verdejo – guitars (2023–present)
- Claudio Hernandez – bass (2023–present)
- Pedro Sabanovich – drums (2023–present)

=== Former members ===
- Raúl Santana – guitars (2002–2003)
- Frank Millard – guitars (2003–2005, 2007–2008)
- Rodrigo Godoy – guitars, vocals (2005–2018)
- Ignacio Bielefeldt – guitars (2008–2012)
- Fernando Arteaga – guitars (2017–2018)
- Andrés Urzua – bass (1995–2000)
- Paulo Cornejo – bass (2000–2018)
- Nicolas Guajardo – bass (2023)
- Ignacio Jiménez – drums (1995–2018)

== Discography ==
- Asunto (Demotape) (1997, Ahimsa Records)
- No Te Dejes Derrotar (Tape) (1998, Ahimsa Records)
- Renacer (Tape) (1999, Ahimsa Records)
- Renacer (CD plus 3 unplished songs) (2001, 78 Life Records)
- Confrontación (CD) (2003, Survival Records)
- Cuando Las Sutilezas Mueren (CD) (2004, En Tus Venas Records)
- El Fuego Sigue Ardiendo (compilatory CD) (2006, Decisión Personal Records)
- Renacer (re-issue, CD plus 3 videos and bonus track) (2006, En Tus Venas Records)
- Afirmación De Vida (CD) (2007, En Tus Venas Records, Decisión Personal Records, Por Tu Capricho Mueren, Sin Fronteras Discos, Dignify Records)
- Retornos (2013, Vegan Records, Inhumano Discos)
