= Brian Schwager =

American musician

Brian Schwager (a.k.a. Ares Schwager) is an American musician and the guitarist from Rapcore band Downset. The 'Ares' nickname came from his days of playing the Dungeons & Dragons role playing game, where his character was called 'Ares' (also known as the Olympian God of War).

Ares Schwager is a long-standing member of the Can't Be Stopped (CBS) graffiti crew in Los Angeles, which includes members Mear One and Stefano Bloch.
