= Rico Villasenor =

American musician

Rico Villasenor is an American musician and the former bassist for Downset. Villasenor also played in the side projects Drunk with Power and Demean with guitarist Brian "Ares" Schwager. On an extended 8 weeks all over European Tour in 2004 Rico and Ares teamed up playing 2 sets every night, with Downset and supporting themselves with their band Demean. There were no day off's, only one Demean gig had to be cancelled for health reasons concerning Ares. This was a safety measure to make sure the Downset headline show and further shows could be played.

Villasenor started his career with the band Manhole, who later changed their name to Tura Satana, featuring rapper and future My Ruin singer Tairrie B.

Rico currently plays with Drunk with Power guitarist, and famed Graffiti artist, Axis in the LA based Metal band The Pain.
