= The Deviants =

The Deviants may refer to:

- The Deviants (film), a 2004 independent comedy about a dating agency for sex deviants
- The Deviants (band), a rock band formerly known as the Social Deviants
- The Deviants 3 (1969), the third and final 1960s album by The Deviants

== See also ==
- Deviant (disambiguation)
