= Merauder =

American hardcore band

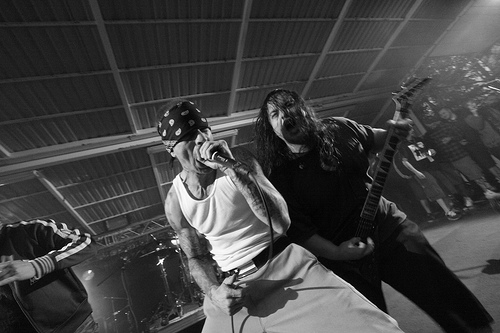
- Merauder performing in 2010

Background information
- Origin: New York City, U.S.
- Genres: Metalcore; hardcore punk; tough guy hardcore; beatdown hardcore; groove metal
- Years active: 1990–2003; 2007–present
- Labels: Century Media; Regain; Kingside
- Members: Jorge Rosado; Kevin Mahon; Gabe "Biggz" Saldivar; Ely Castillo; Marc Rizzo
- Past members: Minus Rodriguez; Eddie Sutton; Javier Carpio; "Karate" Chris Bozeth; Anthony Muccini; Delvin "DJ" Hodges; Dave Stafford; Darian Polach; Ernesto Colon; Andrew "Lumpy" Francis; Dylan Tobia; Eamon Carney; Rick Lopez; Michael MacIvor; Javier E. Javier; Drew Smerdon; Owen Derrill; Dylan Tobia; Vinnie Vitale; Anthony Diaz; Pokey Mo; Dave Chavarri; Walter "Monsta" Ryan; Bobby Blood; Mike Palmeri; George Bignell; Justice Steve; JT Anderson; Jay Shine; Patrick Conley; Joe "Darkside" Branciforte; Fifty On Steve

Merauder is an American metalcore band from New York City, formed in 1990.

== History ==
=== Initial run ===
The group formed in 1990, establishing itself on the New York hardcore and metal scene through frequent touring and a few demo releases. In 1995, after vocalist Jorge Rosado joined to replace Minus Rodriguez, the band released a split EP with Stigmata and toured with Biohazard. Their full-length debut Master Killer was released later that year. The band also scored a slot opening for Fear Factory and toured Europe in 1995 with Böhse Onkelz. Another album, Five Deadly Venoms, followed in 1999. The band split up following the recording of their 2003 release Bluetality.

=== Reformation ===
In 2007, vocalist Jorge Rosado formed his own version of the band. Guitarist Anthony Muccini publicly opposed Rosado's use of the name Merauder, though Muccini himself is not an original member, having replaced the original guitarist, "Karate" Chris Bozeth.

In 2008, the band announced completion of a new studio album recorded at Big Blue Meenie studios in Jersey City, New Jersey, and embarked on headline tours through Europe, Japan, and the U.S. The band also finished touring with the Haunted and the Agonist. A new album titled God Is I was released June 19, 2009, in Europe and August 11, 2009, through Regain Records. Although there were many difficulties with the European release, Regain has sent the copies only to Germany, Switzerland, Austria and the Netherlands.

In December 2009, Merauder toured around Europe with Entombed and Devious. Their last show was at Eindhoven's Metal Meeting, where they shared the stage with Satyricon, Nile and Legion of the Damned.

In May the band went on a tour around the US West Coast (including a festival in Las Vegas with Donnybrook and Grave Maker) and Mexico. In August they joined This is Hardcore festival in Philadelphia, along with Bane, Cro-Mags, Sheer Terror, Death Before Dishonor and more.

In February 2011, a fan-made video for the song "Until" surfaced online featuring Rosado and Smerdon.

In the summer of 2018, Merauder returned to Europe for a full tour with UK metal/hardcore band Climate of Fear, featuring Rosado and longtime bassist Kevin Mahon and members of Climate of Fear filling in. After several years of low activity, Merauder frontman Jorge Rosado brought on longtime friend Gabe “Biggz” Saldivar — bassist and businessman — to help breathe new life into the band. The revitalized Merauder announced a run of festival appearances for 2025, including headlining slots at More Reality Hardcore Festival (Ontario, Canada), Ain’t Like You (Germany), Super Bowl of Hardcore (France), and This Is Hardcore 2025 (Philadelphia, PA). Momentum continued to build with early announcements for 2026, which will see Merauder performing at FYA Fest 12 (Orlando, FL), Pitfest 2026 (Netherlands), Abyss Festival (Switzerland), Alcatraz Festival (Belgium), Sound & Fury, Reign & Fury (Portugal), Hardcore in the 914 Fest (NYC) and several more dates yet to be revealed. In tandem with these live announcements, Merauder underwent several lineup changes. In late September, the band welcomed Ely Castillo (formerly of Bitter End, currently of Hardside) on drums. Soon after, longtime guitarist Patrick Conley was released after joining the band in 2021. His replacement, announced in early October, is guitarist Marc Rizzo, known for his work with Soulfly and Ill Niño. The new lineup was reported to enter the studio and release new music in 2026.

== Band members ==
=== Current members ===
- Jorge Rosado – vocals (1995–2003, 2008–present)
- Kevin Mahon – guitar (2018–present), bass (2013–2018)
- Gabe "Biggz" Saldivar – bass, business manager (2025–present)
- Marc Rizzo – guitar (2025–present)
- Ely Castillo – drums (2025–present)

=== Former members ===
Vocalists

- Minus Rodriguez (of Minus1)
- Eddie Sutton (of Leeway; died 2024)

Guitarists

- Javier Carpio (died 2006)
- "Karate" Chris Bozeth
- Anthony Muccini
- Delvin "DJ" Hodges
- Dave Stafford
- Darian Polach
- Ernesto Colon (2013–2018; died 2026)
- Andrew "Lumpy" Francis
- Dylan Tobia
- Patrick Conley – guitar (2021–2025)

Bassists

- Eamon Carney
- Rick Lopez
- Michael MacIvor (of Candiria, Dead Air, Rampage)
- Javier E. Javier
- Drew Smerdon
- Owen Derrill
- Dylan Tobia
- JT Anderson

Drummers

- Vinnie Vitale
- Pokey Mo (of Leeway)
- Dave Chavarri
- Walter "Monsta" Ryan (of D.R.I., Machine Head, Madball)
- Bobby Blood (2008–2018)
- Mike Palmeri (of Life of Agony, Wrench)
- George Bignell
- Jay Shine (2018–2025)
- Joe "Darkside" Branciforte

=== Original lineup – 1990 demo ===
- Minus – vocals
- Javier Carpio "Sob" – guitar
- "Karate" Chris Bozeth – guitar
- Eamon Carney – bass
- Vinnie Vitale – drums

== Discography ==
=== Studio albums ===
- Master Killer (1995, Century Media)
- Five Deadly Venoms (1999, Century Media)
- Bluetality (2003, Century Media)
- God Is I (2009, Regain Records)

=== Other ===
- Demo Tape with Minus on vocals (1993)
- Split EP with Stigmata (1995, Stone Records)
- Demo Tape with Eddie Sutton of Leeway on vocals (1998)
- Master Killers: A Complete Anthology (compilation) (2007, Century Media)

=== Covers ===
- "Downfall of Christ" by Heaven Shall Burn (album – Iconoclast (Part 1: The Final Resistance))
- "Life Is Pain" by Hatebreed (album – For the Lions)
- "Master Killer" by God Forbid (Century Media Records's 2CD compilation Covering 20 Years of Extremes)
- "See You in Hell" from Grim Reaper's album See You in Hell (1984) (featured on the album God Is I)
- "Master Killer" by Twitching Tongues, a bonus track on the album World War Live
