= Deviance =

Deviance may refer to:

- Deviance (sociology), actions or behaviors that violate social norms
- Deviancy amplification spiral, a cognitive bias (error in judgement) and a deviancy amplification term used by interactionist sociologists
- Deviance (statistics), a quality of fit statistic for a model
- Positive deviance, an approach to behavioral and social change
- Sexual deviance (historical term) or paraphilia, recurring or intense sexual arousal to atypical things
- Deviance or bid'ah, innovations and deviant acts or groups from orthodox Islamic law (Sharia)

== See also ==
- Deviant (disambiguation)
- Deviation (disambiguation)
- Discrepancy (disambiguation)
- Divergence (disambiguation)
