= Deviation =

Deviation may refer to:

== Mathematics and engineering ==
- Allowance (engineering), an engineering and machining allowance is a planned deviation between an actual dimension and a nominal or theoretical dimension, or between an intermediate-stage dimension and an intended final dimension.
- Deviation (statistics), the difference between the value of an observation and the mean of the population in mathematics and statistics
  - Standard deviation, which is based on the square of the difference
  - Absolute deviation, where the absolute value of the difference is used
  - Relative standard deviation, in probability theory and statistics is the absolute value of the coefficient of variation
- Deviation of a local ring in mathematics
- Deviation of a poset in mathematics
- Frequency deviation, the maximum allowed "distance" in FM radio from the nominal frequency a station broadcasts at
- Magnetic deviation, the error induced in compasses by local magnetic fields

== Albums ==
- Deviation (Jayne County album), 1995
- Deviation (Béla Fleck album), 1984
- Deviate (album), a 1998 album by Kill II This
- Devi/ation, a volume of The Early Years 1965–1972 by Pink Floyd

== Other uses ==
- Bid‘ah, Islamic term for innovations and deviations acts or groups from orthodox Islamic law (Sharia).
- Deviance (sociology), a behavior that is a recognized violation of social norms
- Deviation (1971 film), a horror film
- Deviation (2006 film), a short film
- Deviation, a 2012 British thriller film starring Danny Dyer
- Deviation (law) is a departure from a contract or a ship's course, thus breaching the contract
- Deviationism, an expressed belief which is not in accordance with official party doctrine
- A work of art in the online community DeviantArt

== See also ==
- Deviance (disambiguation)
- Deviant (disambiguation)
- Devious (disambiguation)
