= Deviant (disambiguation) =

Deviant most commonly refers to deviant behavior, particularly in relation to social norms.

Deviant may also refer to:

- Deviant (comics), a fictional race of humanoids in the Marvel Comics universe
- Deviant (2018 film), a short film by Benjamin Howard
- Deviant (2024 film), a Spanish film
- Deviant logic, a class of non-classical logics
- "Deviant" (CSI: Miami episode)
- A member of the DeviantArt online community
- Deviants, a fictional race of Androids which have gained artificial consciousness in the game Detroit: Become Human
- Deviant: The Renegades, a role-playing game, 2021.

== Music ==
- Deviant Records, an inactive trance music record label
- Deviant (Pitchshifter album), 2000
- Deviant (Regurgitate album), 2003

== See also ==
- The Deviants (disambiguation)
- Deviance (disambiguation)
- Deviation (disambiguation)
