= Bent edge =

Hardcore punk subculture

Bent edge or curved edge was a hardcore punk subculture that was formed as counter-movement to the straight edge movement. It was started by members of Washington, DC hardcore scene who were fed up with the rigidness and intolerance in the nascent straight edge scene. To combat straight edge, they started throwing alcohol and drug-fueled punk shows. The point of these shows was to be the complete antithesis of straight edge.

Quickly, this idea spread throughout the US. As early as 1982, only a year after Straight Edge was released, audience members were approaching Minor Threat while they were on tour telling them that they were bent or curved edge. To Ian Mackaye, "the anti-movement started before the movement began. People were rebelling against straight edge before there was even a movement to rebel against".

Bent edge was also part of a rising anti-Dischord sentiment among many people in the punk scene. At the time that bent edge started, there were several people living in the Dischord Records House that were not straight edge. Straight edge and non-straight edge people mixed freely. However, as time went on, the tolerance in the straight edge scene faded; this added momentum to the bent edge ideals.

== Bands ==
- Black Market Baby
