= Anger (downset. song) =

1994 single by downset.

- Mercury single release cover

Single by downset.

from the album downset.
- B-side: "Ritual"
- Released: January 1994; June 13, 1994 (re-release)
- Recorded: 1993
- Genre: Rapcore; hardcore punk; rap metal
- Length: 4:13
- Label: Abstract Recordings; Mercury (re-release)
- Songwriter: downset.
- Producers: Roy Z.; downset.

Downset. singles chronology
"About Ta Blast" (1993)	"Anger" (1994)	"Downset" (1995)

Music video
- "Anger" on YouTube

Alternative covers
- Original cover used for "Anger / Ritual"

"Anger" (also stylized as "Anger!") is a song by American rapcore band downset. It was first released independently as a 7-inch single on Abstract Recordings. The song's lyrics discuss the 1992 Los Angeles riots and police brutality, whilst criticizing gang culture and racism.

"Anger" was instrumental in the band attracting major label interest, and helped them get signed to Mercury Records, who re-released the song as the lead single of the band's 1994 self-titled debut album. Despite not having any chart success, it is regarded as the band's signature song.

== Composition and lyrics ==
"The anger of a generation was being heard all over this world and I knew from this day on that the people of L.A. would never be the same after this. It was the beginning of the end. Anger. Anger. On April 29 of 1992 Love was gone and hatred in the hearts of man was more important than compassion." -Rey Oropeza

"Anger" is a rapcore song. The song is written in the key of C major with a common time tempo of 164 beats per minute. The song's guitars are down-tuned to drop C tuning.

"Anger" was lyrically inspired Rey Oropeza's experiences witnessing, and his frustration of, the 1992 Los Angeles riots on April 29, 1992 when the riots began following the jury's not guilty verdict of the Los Angeles Police Department ("April 29/L.A. swine not guilty"), as well as mentioning Latasha Harris, whose failed appeal on her murder played a significant role in starting the riots. The song also mentions the death of Rey Oropeza's father, who was killed at the hands of the L.A.P.D. in 1971 when Rey was eight months old. "When your loved ones are murdered by the hands of this system and you are exposed to a lifelong dreary existence at the mercy of the welfare system and practically useless schooling by the LAUSD, I will guarantee you that you will build and feel a hate that only a starving poor ghetto-barrio child could fully understand."

The song's second verse expresses Oropeza's frustration at poseurs and the gang lifestyle he had come out of. "When I was saying ‘true blue’, I was saying fuck that, there was a lot of fucking suckers around, you know, fools that were trying to play it like they grew up in the rough."

=== Zack de la Rocha diss ===
In the original version of "Anger", the second verse contained a diss at Zack de la Rocha of Rage Against The Machine, ("Zack, what you know about a set or a sign?") that was later removed in the re-release. In a statement provided in the band's fanzine, Rey Oropeza outlined the reasons for the verse's removal;

"What we have changed are the lyrics that aimed at a certain person and band that meant something to a generation of people. Before the fake accent that you could get only if you grew up in the ghetto, which he is far from being from.... I could say so much more, but one thing is for sure - me and others in this band are from a true history of hip-hop.... I know for sure no matter what that we will live in the shadow of this band. We will be compared to this band over and over again.... So I lay this to rest knowing how long I have been doing this. My sincere identity in the graffiti art hip-hop true school world. Knowing that I am from L.A. '818 Valle' and not from Irvine. I am from the barrio-ghetto and it means much to me and my identity...."

In a 2016 interview on the "Talk Toomey" podcast (run by Primer 55 bassist Josh Toomey), bassist James Morris stated that the band had no jealousy or ill feelings towards Rage Against The Machine; "It was never anything for me but like ‘wow, are you kidding me? The kind of music we made in high school can…’ Like they came up—we all came up at the same time—but they took off. Like it went from 0 to 60, like almost overnight. All of a sudden it was us and Rage and then boom, Rage had sort of staked the claim for rap and hardcore together. I never saw it as anything but a great thing for music in general. I was never jealous or sort of that hateful type, that you know ‘f-them.’ We’re cool, they took it and ran with it so no, never any of that. I was always very happy to see what I was doing was so successful.”

== Release ==
"Anger" was initially released in January on Abstract Recordings as a 7-inch single, with the B-side being "Ritual". After the band signed with Mercury in 1994, the song was released as a single for radio airplay on June 13, 1994.

=== 2022 vinyl reissue ===
Following the band's signing to Nuclear Blast Records in February 2022, the band announced reissues of the "Anger / Ritual" and the "About Ta Blast" singles on 7-inch vinyl; these are both scheduled to be released on October 14, 2022.

== Legacy ==
Despite the song not having chart success, "Anger" has since been regarded by fans and the band to be downset.'s signature song. In a 2017 interview to No Echo, bassist James Morris commented on the song's legacy; "There was no doubt from the sound of the song, to what the lyrics pointed to, and the culture of the time, that we had something special. It was the perfect time for that song to come out."

== Personnel ==
Adapted from Tidal.

downset.
- Rey Oropeza – vocals
- James Morris – bass guitar
- Chris Lee – drums
- Brian "Ares" Schwarger – guitar
- Rogelio "Roy" Lozano – guitar
Production
- Roy Z. – production, mixing, engineering
- Joe Floyd – mixing, engineering
- Sean Kenesie – mixing, engineering
