= Deviation (2006 film) =

- Directed by: Jon Griggs
- Written by: Jon Griggs
- Produced by: Jon Griggs
- Starring: "Macintyre" -- Rick Albee (virtual player), Jeff Jackson (voice); "SGT" -- Anthony Esposito (virtual player), Vinny Nestler (voice); "Lizard" -- Grant Kehrig (virtual player), Curtis Brien (voice); "Crow" -- Ben Armbrust (virtual player), Glen Brackenridge (voice); Also starring -- Ritchie Duncan as the voice of"Pilot"; Aaron Simms as the voice of "Command"
- Edited by: Jon Griggs
- Music by: Nicholas J. Sumner
- Distributed by: Atom Films
- Release date: 2006
- Running time: 6 minutes 12 seconds
- Country: United States
- Language: English

Deviation is a 2006 short film that was the first short film in the machinima genre to be premiered in competition at a major film festival, the Tribeca Film Festival.

== Background ==
The 6 minute 12 second-long short machinima film Deviation, was written and directed by Jon Griggs of Hard Light Films. Using the virtual world of the online game Counter Strike, Griggs directed the virtual actors and recorded the footage using a DVX100. Deviation was entered as a candidate for shortlist and screening at the Tribeca Film Festival as part of the New York counterpart of Australia's Tropfest, Tropfest @ Tribeca programme, which celebrates the importance of short film in the filmmaking industry. Each entry had to include a signature theme; in 2006 this was the presence of a manhole cover.

Deviation almost did not make it to the Tribeca Film Festival since, shortly before the film's premiere, the game manufacturer of Counter Strike, the Valve, refused to give permission for the film to be distributed for commercial use. Valve maintained that as intellectual property owners of Counter Strike, they had definitive rights over its distribution. In response, Griggs informed Valve of his intention to release a "protest video" version of Deviation in which all of Valve's intellectual property was removed, leaving just the actor's voices, music and story, and replacing the visuals with simple words and pictures depicting Grigg's struggle with Valve, and a call to viewers to support him. Valve eventually backed down and the all-clear was given for the motion picture to be released on 28 April 2006 at the Tribeca Film Festival in front of a live audience of over 4,000 people.

The motion picture is accompanied by an original score (composed and performed by Nicholas J. Sumner), original sound design by Neil Fazzari and actors’ voices to deliver the dialogue. The opening credits to the film announce that this is “a virtual film created online...with virtual actors performing across different U.S. States...who have never met each other in the “real” world”.

== Plot synopsis ==
MacIntyre is a videogame character who begins to question his repetitive life within the context of his duties as a virtual soldier in a four-man counter-terrorist squad. Tired of running through the same tunnels every day, ascending the same manhole and getting killed in battle each time, he tries to encourages his superior, “Sgt” and the rest of his team (“Lizard” and “Crow”) to rationalise their monotonous behaviour. "Doesn’t it strike you as strange," MacIntyre asks, "that we keep doing the same thing over and over and over?" MacIntyre raises questions about what the purpose of life as a virtual soldier is, why they have to follow orders and who exactly is it that gives them the orders that they dutifully follow to the death anyway?

MacIntyre almost manages to successfully persuade his 'young' team mate Crow that there could be “another way”, but indecisive Crow is coerced by Sgt and Lizard, who are fully indoctrinated into the call of duty, into filing rank and following orders.

== Discussion ==
Whereas other machinima films tend to use the context of a video game to reflect real life scenarios, Deviation turns this idea on its head and instead uses ideas of human introspection to tell a computer generated story and satirises “the absurd repetition of first-person-shooter games” through character MacIntyre’s existential crisis. Whereas other machinima sequences have been distributed freely on the internet via sites such as YouTube and remain an inherent part of gamer culture, in Deviation, Jon Griggs attempted to separate the genre from the video game world and establish it as a film in its own right. To this end, Deviation was only released in full form at the Tribeca Film Festival; before this, only a movie-style trailer was released and even after its premier, though made freely available, Deviation earns royalties and is subject to a licensing contract with independent film network, Atom Films.

It has been suggested that in the script of Deviation, Griggs is asking a politically loaded question; “Who is leading whom?”, which invokes thoughts of the political outcry surrounding George W. Bush’s War on Terror in Iraq.

== Cast and crew ==
- Macintyre: Virtual player - Rick Albee, Voice - Jeff Jackson
- SGT: Virtual player – Anthony Esposito, Voice – Vinny Nestler
- Lizard: Virtual player – Grant Kehrig, Voice – Curtis Brien
- Crow: Virtual player – Ben Armbrust, Voice – Glen Brackenridge
- Pilot: Voice – Ritchie Duncan
- Command: Voice – Aaron Simms
- Editor: Jon Griggs
- Music composer and performer: Nicholas J. Sumner
- Sound design: Neil Fazzari
- Sound supervisor and re-recording mixer: Tom Efinger
- Sound Mixer: John Moros
- Foley Artist: Leslie Bloom
- ADR Recordist: Nicholas J. Schenck
- Assistant sound editor: Michael Vondras
- Audio post facility: Dig It Audio Inc.
- Post production facility: Post Logic Studios NY
- Technical support: Joe Tackaberry
- Additional assistance Jonah Colbert
- Server provided by: David M. Baumler

== Process ==
Deviation was created by using the virtual environment of Counter Strike to block, rehearse, and shoot the scenes. Characters were controlled by players across the country and directed by Griggs through online voice chat. The scenes were framed using a virtual camera then shot with a Panasonic DVX100 videoing the computer screen. The coverage was edited traditionally using Final Cut Pro then sound design, voice acting and score were added to complete the film.

== Awards and Festival Screenings ==
By being the first machinima piece to be officially selected and premiered in competition at a major film festival (that being the Tribeca Film Festival in New York City in 2006), Deviation is credited with being the first machinima short film to be classed as a film in its own right by the film community. Film Quarterly notes Deviation “as the first machinima film to premiere at a major festival, Deviation's theatrical screening at Tribeca marked the break-out of this Internet-fueled, gamer-geek mode of virtual filmmaking into mainstream cinema.” Shortly afterwards, in September 2006, Deviation was also selected for the Academy of Machinima Arts & Sciences Machinima Festival, where it picked up “Mackie” awards for Best Voice Acting Performance and Best Sound Design. At this festival, the film was simultaneously screened in a physical movie theatre and watched by real people, as well as being shown in a virtual online cinema, watched by gamers’ avatar in the virtual world of Second Life, or in a live simulcast shown by Destroy TV.

As well as its premiere at Tribeca, 2007 saw Deviation being selected for screening at several other notable film festivals.

- September 2006 - Official Selection - Academy of Machinima Arts & Sciences Machinima Festival, New York, USA
- February 2007, Official Selection - Clermont-Ferrand Short Film Festival, France
- May 2007 - Official Selection - Rochester International Film Festival, Rochester, USA
- June 2007 - Official Selection - Seattle International Film Festival, Seattle, USA
- July 2007, Official Selection - Puchon International Fantastic Film Festival, South Korea
- August 2007 - Anonimul International Independent Film Festival, Sfantu Gheorghe, Romania
- September 2007 - Official Selection - Seoul International Film Festival, Seoul, Korea
- September 2007 - Official Selection - VisionFest, New York, USA
- October 2007 - Official Selection - Festival Nouveau Cinema, Montreal, Canada
