= Bobby Blood (musician) =

American drummer

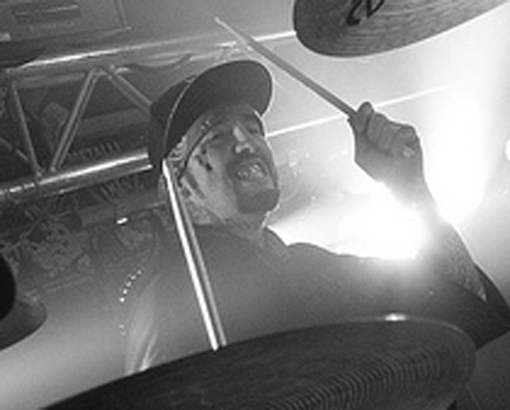
- Bobby Blood live in Finland

Background information
- Origin: Southgate, California, U.S.
- Genres: Hardcore punk, punk rock, death metal
- Occupations: Musician, filmmaker
- Instruments: Drums
- Years active: 1997–present
- Website: bobbyblood.com

Bobby Ponte, known professionally as Bobby Blood, is an American musician and filmmaker. He is the former drummer of the NYHC band Merauder and current drummer of Los Angeles rap metal band Downset. He is also the writer-director of the movies Hell Nurse, The Death Valley Meth Lab, Hearse Hotel and Terror 66.

== Biography ==
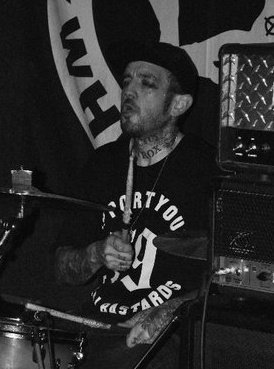
Bobby Blood performing

Born in the 1970s to a Portuguese father and a Mexican mother, Bobby Blood grew up in Southern California where he began music as the drummer in a hardcore metal band called Revenge at age 16. He served eight years in the US Army, earning National Defense Service Medals for service in both the Middle East and South Korea.

Blood has served time in a California prison for gang-related weapons and assault charges against a police officer. Blood plays guitar and is the founder of the hardcore beatdown band Cold Existence. Bobby Blood is heavily tattooed. He supports animal rights, and is a PETA spokesperson. Blood is a lifelong advocate of a straight edge lifestyle and a longtime vegan who regularly speaks on behalf of animal rights during interviews.

In March 2010, Bobby Blood reappeared on drums with First Blood for the first time in four years for tours of the US, Mexico, Central America, and Canada. In the summer of 2010 Blood was also on stage with Merauder for headlining tours of US, Mexico, Scandinavia, and Europe. In August 2010 Blood was on stage as guitarist with Cold Existence for a headlining tour of Europe including appearances at Ieper Hardcore Festival and Filled With Hate Festival. Blood played his final shows with Merauder in September 2010 during a headline tour of Canada. In November–December 2010 Blood appeared on drums with First Blood for support tours of Australia and New Zealand. In January–February 2011 Blood appeared on drums with First Blood for support tours of Europe and the United Kingdom including an appearance at Switzerland's Dance of Days Festival.

In 2012, Bobby Blood appeared on bass guitar with Murder Death Kill for tours of the US as well as on drums with First Blood for tours of Europe, Japan, Brazil and the US and at Superbowl of Hardcore Black N Blue Bowl in NYC. Blood also reappeared on drums with Merauder for the music festival Summer of Hate in Cleveland, Ohio, in July 2012.

In 2013, Bobby Blood appeared on drums with Crowd Deterrent in Germany for Filled With Hate and Return To Strength Festivals as well as in Cleveland, Ohio, for the Summer of Hate Festival where he also appeared on drums once again with Merauder. Blood also appeared on drums for tours of Australia and Europe with First Blood. In the summer of 2013 Blood announced the creation of a Horror anthology titled The Haunted Room.

in 2014, Blood appeared on bass guitar with Race Riot 59 for tours of the US, Europe, and the United Kingdom. Blood appeared on drums with Merauder for tours of USA and Australia. Blood also appeared on drums with First Blood for tours of Europe including an appearance at France's Hellfest.

In 2015, Bobby Blood appeared on drums with Merauder for tours of Europe and the UK including appearances at France's Hellfest and Spain's Resurrection Fest. Blood also appeared on drums with First Blood for tours of Europe Japan and China including appearances at Germany's Summerblast Festival, Japan's Bloodaxe Festival, and China's Playrock Festival. In early 2015 Bobby Blood founded Wolfpack Tattoo in Las Vegas.

In 2016, Bobby Blood announced the remake of Terror 66 and the new short horror film Hearse Hotel, both to be premiered as a grindhouse feature on August 15, 2016, at Galaxy Movie Theater in Las Vegas. Also in 2016, Merauder announced its final concert tours of USA, Japan, South America and Australia with Bobby Blood as the drummer.

In early 2016, Bobby Blood appeared on drums with Merauder at the New England Metal & Hardcore Festival in Worcester, MA.

Between the Summer of 2016 and the Summer of 2017, Bobby Blood was involved in 2 separate shootings. One in Las Vegas, NV in which Blood admitted to being the shooter, leaving two injured and one dead. Blood was cleared of charges due to video surveillance of the incident and Nevada's Stand Your Ground law. Another was in Dearborn, MI where Blood was also the shooter, resulting in 1 dead, at least one injured, and extensive property damage. Blood was eventually cleared of charges, again based on Michigan's Stand Your Ground. Blood was also detained in a non-fatal stabbing of two men in Medford, OR but was not charged due to lack of evidence and witness statements, despite the recovery of the weapon used in the assault.

In August 2017, Bobby Blood appeared on drums with Crowd Deterrent for a European tour including an appearance at Belgium's Ieper Open Air Hardcore Festival.

In August 2018, Blood returned from legal troubles and resumed his musical career drumming for the Los Angeles hardcore band Cutthroat LA. The band did several tours of Europe, Japan, South America, and North America including an appearance at Germany's Reload Festival 2019. In January 2020 Cutthroat LA joined European traveling hardcore festival Persistence Tour in support of Agnostic Front, H_{2}O, Wisdom in Chains and Gorilla Biscuits.

In November 2018, Bobby Blood co-founded the retro horror show and podcast 85 Grave with Lauren Blood. Both serve as hosts of 85 Grave's popular YouTube show.

In early 2020, Blood returned to American rap metal band Downset. and performed one concert in Los Angeles in direct support of Ice-T's Body Count before all touring was ceased in wake of the COVID-19 pandemic.

On January 26, 2022, Blood premiered Hell Nurse at the Galaxy Movie Theater in Las Vegas, Nevada. In late Spring 2022, he released a teaser for the horror film Barry the Hatchet and announced that principal photography of the film had begun.

== Filmography ==
- The Anniversary (2004) – writer, director, producer
- La Llorona (2005) [documentary] – director, producer
- Hurricane Katrina (2006) [documentary] – director, producer
- The Death Valley Meth Lab (2006) – writer, director, producer
- Black N Blue Bowl (2008) – Drummer of Merauder
- Terror 66 (2010) – writer, director, producer
- Hearse Hotel (2017) – writer, director, producer
- Terror 66 Remake (2018) – writer, director, producer
- Harvest Moon (2018) – writer, director, producer
- Hell Nurse (2022) – writer, director, producer
- Barry the Hatchet (2023) – writer, director, producer

== Discography ==
- Volume One – Four Bolt Main (2001) – Drummer
- Hunting Season – Four Bolt Main (2003 Embryo Records) – Drummer
- This Is Armageddon..5 Songs of Absolution – Crematorium (2004 Prosthetic Records) – Drummer
- Killafornia – First Blood (2006 Trustkill Records) – Drummer
- Rules – First Blood (2017 Bullettooth Records) – Drummer
- God Is I – Merauder (2009 Regain Records) – Drummer
- Until the End – Set Afire (2009) – Drummer
- Mob Firing/Six Terror Six – Cold Existence (2010 Filled with Hate Records) – guitarist
- Lessons Not Learned In Blood Are Soon Forgotten – Cold Existence (2014 Deadlight Entertainment) – guitarist
- I Am the Devil – Vegan Jihad (2017 independent) – guitarist
- Maintain – Downset (2022 Nuclear Blast Records) – Drummer
