= About Ta Blast =

1993 single by downset.

Single by downset.
- B-side: "Body Cry"
- Released: August 1993
- Recorded: 1993
- Genre: Rapcore
- Length: 7:56
- Label: Abstract Recordings
- Songwriter: downset.
- Producer: Roy Z.

Downset. singles chronology
"About Ta Blast" (1993)	"Anger" (1994)

"About Ta Blast" is the debut single by American rapcore band downset. It was released as a seven-inch single in August 1993 through Abstract Recordings. The song was later re-recorded for the band's self-titled debut album in 1994 under the spelling "About To Blast". In 2022, it was reissued with the demo version of "Breed The Killer" as a bonus track.

== Composition and lyrics ==
"About Ta Blast" is a rapcore song. The original version of the song is written in the key of B-flat major with a common time tempo of 96 beats per minute. The song's guitars are tuned to Drop D-flat.

While parts of the song were previously written beforehand, the song is based around the aftermath of the 1992 Los Angeles riots and the lack of progress and change in police brutality following the riots. It was also written about his friend, Scam, who was forced to leave his home in Watts, Los Angeles due to the consistent harassment by the Los Angeles Police Department. "You would think that after all the riots and the rest of the turmoil that has happened in this city that the police would change their attitudes towards people, but he told me how cops continually harass people and set people up for no reason. People that live in these ghetto-barrio places can only put up with so much harassment. He had to leave his home because the harassment was too much and jail just for being or living there was not right." Rey also made clear the simmering tensions in Los Angeles following the riots that was getting worse even after the riots; "818 about to blast! 213 about to blast! 310 about to blast! It can happen again."

== Release ==
"About Ta Blast" was released in August 1993 by Abstract Recordings. "About To Blast" was included on the band's self-titled debut album the following year.

In February 2022, it was announced that the single would be re-issued alongside "Anger / Ritual" by Nuclear Blast Records with a demo version of "Breed The Killer" being included with it. "Breed The Killer" also received a music video.

== Track listing ==
All tracks are written by downset. and Roy Z, except where noted.

Side A (down side)
No.	Title	Length
1.	"About Ta Blast"	3:10

Side B (set side)
No.	Title	Length
1.	"Body Cry"	4:46
Total length:		7:56

=== 2022 reissue ===
No.	Title	Writer(s)	Length
1.	"About Ta Blast (demo)"		3:10
2.	"Body Cry (demo)"		4:46
3.	"Breed The Killer (demo)"	downset.; James Morris	2:51
Total length:			10:47

== Personnel ==
Adapted from Tidal.

downset.

- Rey Oropeza – vocals, songwriting
- Chris Lee – drums, songwriting
- Rogelio "Roy" Lozano – guitar, songwriting
- Roger H. Ramirez – bass guitar, songwriting
- James Morris – bass guitar, songwriting (on "Breed The Killer")

Production

- Roy Z – producer (all tracks), songwriting
