= Straight edge =

Subculture of hardcore punk

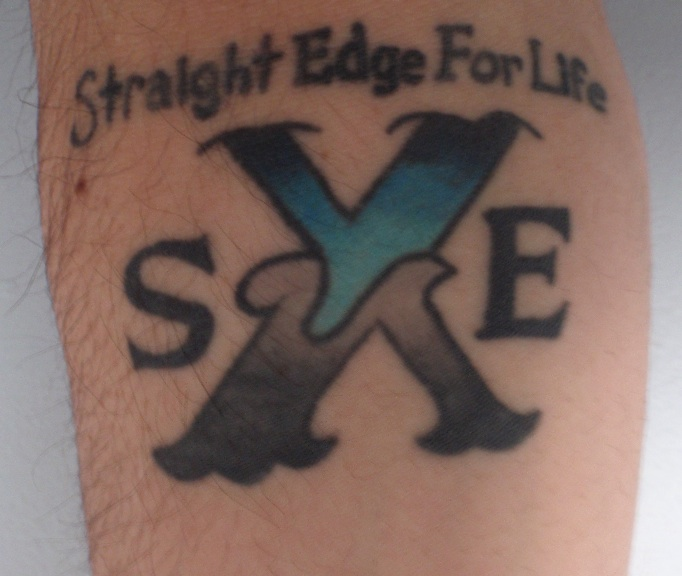
A straight edge tattoo

Straight edge (sometimes abbreviated as sXe or signified by XXX or simply X) is a subculture of hardcore punk whose adherents refrain from using alcohol, tobacco, and other recreational drugs in reaction to the punk subculture's perceived excesses. Some adherents refrain from engaging in promiscuous or casual sex, follow a vegetarian or vegan diet and do not consume caffeine or prescription drugs. The term "straight edge" was adopted from the 1981 song "Straight Edge" by the hardcore punk band Minor Threat.

The straight-edge subculture emerged amid the early 1980s hardcore punk scene. Since then, a wide variety of beliefs and ideas have been associated with the movement, including vegetarianism and animal rights. While the commonly expressed aspects of the straight edge subculture have been abstinence from alcohol, nicotine, and illegal drugs, there have been considerable variations. Disagreements often arise as to the primary reasons for living straight edge. Straight edge politics vary, from explicitly revolutionary to conservative. Some activists have approached Straight Edge with skepticism, ridicule or even outright hostility in part due to what they perceived as the straight edge movement's self-righteous militancy.

In 1999, William Tsitsos wrote that straight edge had gone through three eras since its founding in the early 1980s. Bent edge began as a counter-movement to straight edge by members of the Washington, D.C., hardcore scene who were frustrated by the rigidity and intolerance in the scene. During the youth crew era, which started in the mid-1980s, the influence of music on the straight edge scene was at an all-time high. By the early 1990s, militant straight edge was a well-known part of the wider punk scene. In the early to mid-1990s, straight edge spread from the United States to Northern Europe, Eastern Europe, the Middle East, and South America. By the beginning of the 2000s, militant straight-edge punks had largely left the broader straight-edge culture and movement.

== History ==
=== 1970s and early 1980s ===
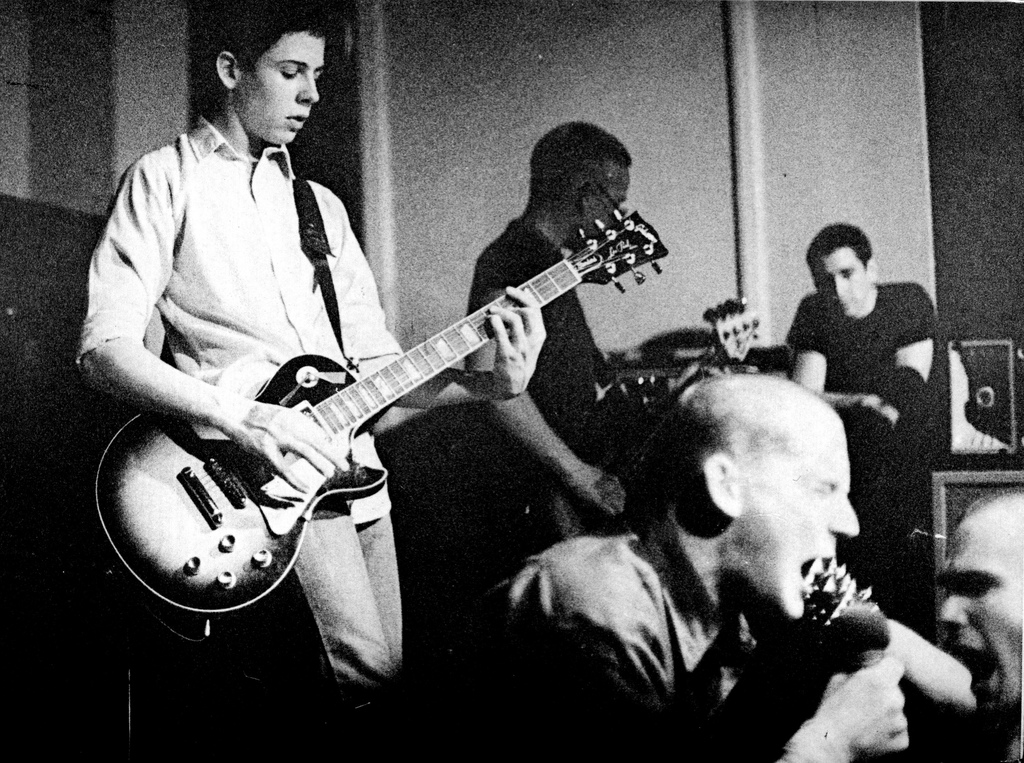
Minor Threat, pictured in 1981, coined the term "straight edge".

Straight edge grew out of hardcore punk in the late 1970s and early 1980s and was partly characterized by shouted rather than sung vocals. Straight-edge individuals of this early era often associated with the original punk ideals such as individualism, disdain for work and school, and live-for-the-moment attitudes. The movement was influenced by the political and social climate of its origin, around the time of the "Just Say No" campaign and a rise in conservative viewpoints. The discipline of the subculture came from a mix of leftist radicalism and conservative influences.

Straight edge sentiments can be found in songs by the early 1980s band Minor Threat. This anti-inebriation movement had been developing in punk before Minor Threat, but their song "Straight Edge" was influential in giving the scene a name, and something of a (somewhat unwilling) figurehead. Minor Threat frontman Ian MacKaye is often credited with birthing the straight edge name and movement and in later years has often spoken out about how he never intended it to be a movement.

Straight edge sentiments can also be found in the song "Keep it Clean" by English punk band The Vibrators, and the Modern Lovers song "I'm Straight", recorded in 1973, which rejected drug use. Ted Nugent was a key influence on the straight edge ideology as one of the few prominent 1970s hard rock icons to eschew alcohol and other drug use explicitly.

Straight edge started in Washington, D.C., and quickly spread throughout the United States and Canada. By the 1980s, bands on the West Coast, such as America's Hardcore, Stalag 13, Justice League, and Uniform Choice, were gaining popularity. In the early stages of this subculture's history, concerts often consisted of both punk bands and straight edge bands. Circumstances soon changed, and the early 1980s eventually was viewed as the time "before the two scenes separated". Other early straight edge bands include State of Alert, Government Issue, Teen Idles, The Faith, 7 Seconds, SSD, DYS, and Negative FX.

==== Bent edge ====
Bent edge originated as a counter-movement to straight edge among members of the hardcore scene who were frustrated by the rigidity and intolerance of the scene. This idea spread; on Minor Threat's first tour in 1982, people identified themselves as bent, crooked, or curved edge. The counter-movement was short-lived, and it faded away by the end of the 1990s.

=== Youth crew (mid-1980s) ===
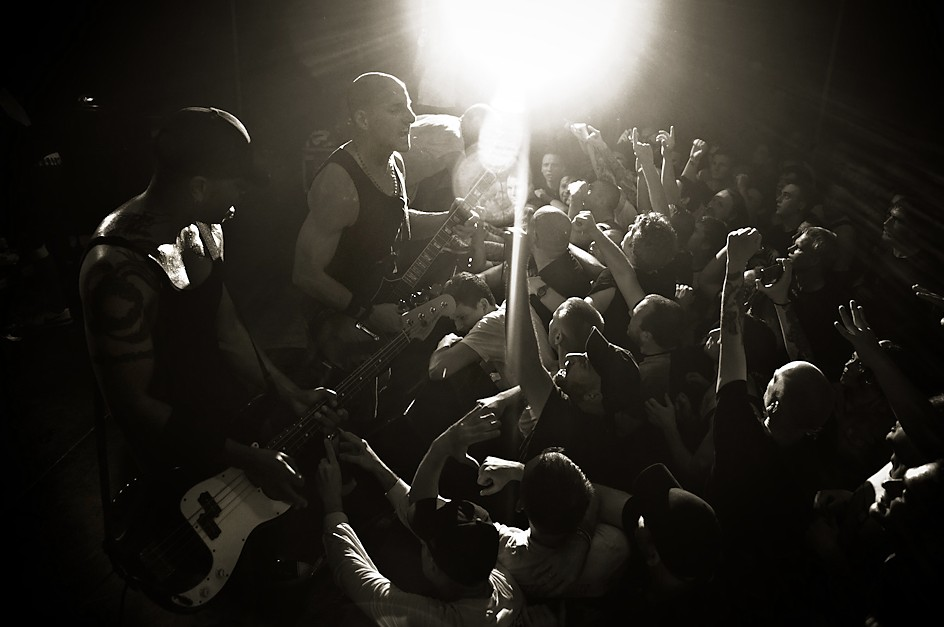
Youth of Today, youth crew pioneers

During the youth crew era, which started in the mid-1980s, the influence of music on the straight-edge scene seemed to be at an all-time high. The branches of straight edge that came about during this era seemed to originate from ideas presented in songs, and many youth crew bands had a strong heavy metal influence. Notable youth crew bands included: Youth of Today, Gorilla Biscuits, Judge, Bold, Chain of Strength, Turning Point, Uniform Choice, and Slapshot.

In the mid-1980s, the band Youth of Today became associated with the straight-edge movement, and their song "Youth Crew" expressed a desire to unite the scene into a movement. Vegetarianism became an important theme in straight edge during this era, starting with Youth of Today's 1988 song "No More", which contained lyrics condemning the consumption of meat. This trend toward animal rights and veganism within the straight edge movement reached its peak in the 1990s.

=== 1990s ===
By the early 1990s, straight edge became a well-known part of the wider punk and DIY scene and underwent musical and political shifts. In the early part of the decade, several straight-edge punks and their bands picked up on the vegetarian and other social justice politics of the mid-1980s and began comprehensively advocating for social justice, animal liberation, veganism, and straight edge. During this period, the straight edge scene birthed two major offshoots: the more conservative hardline and the Krishna Consciousness influenced, retrospectively known as Krishnacore. While the majority of straight edge punks and Hare Krishna converts were pacifists, those influenced by hardline showed a willingness to resort to violence to promote their subculture. Musically, the straight edge scene increasingly was drawing from heavy metal and was a founding influence on metalcore.

=== 2000s ===
By the beginning of the 2000s, only small groups of militant straight edge individuals remained. Contrary to news reports that portrayed straight edge as a gang, several studies have shown that straight edge individuals as a whole are mostly peaceful people. In the 2000s, there was a growing amount of tolerance of people who do not follow the straight edge lifestyle by straight edge individuals. In this incarnation of straight edge, the musical styles of the bands involved are more varied, ranging from a youth crew revival style to metalcore to posicore. Straight edge bands from the 2000s include Allegiance, Champion, Down to Nothing, Embrace Today, Have Heart, and Throwdown.

== Ideology ==
Its philosophy in the early stages of straight edge was to rebel through self-control. With the ability to control one's actions, a straight edge participant would be better suited to stand against the mainstream. The first wave of straight edge did not impose rules on others, and participants chose to follow the ways of self-control. With the second wave of straight edge, these rules were used to control others. Additionally, the second wave experienced a change in music style. Where the first wave was influenced by hardcore punk, the second wave brought in aspects of heavy metal music that pushed for power and control over others. The slowing down of the music reflected the focus of individuals in their journey to self-control.

=== Hate Edge ===
Hate Edge (also known as NS or National Socialist Straight Edge) is a neo-Nazi offshoot of the straight edge movement. Prominent Hate Edge groups include NS/WP and Sober and Angry Youth; both groups are responsible for attacks on, and murders of, leftists and ethnic minorities such as Roma.

== Outside the United States ==
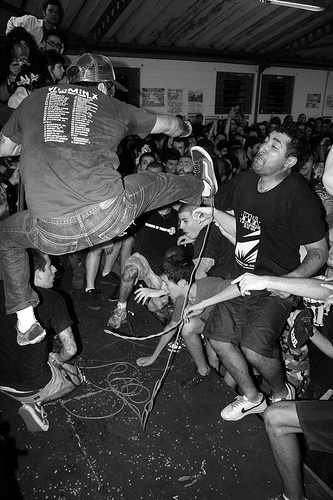
The Brazilian vegan straight edge band Point of No Return in 2006

In the early to mid-1990s, straight edge spread from the United States to Northern Europe, Eastern Europe, the Middle East, and South America. It grew around the world due to the relentless touring of youth crew bands and the ease of ordering records from American record labels via mail. Fluff Fest, which has been held in the Czech Republic since 2000 and draws audiences from across Europe, is linked to straight edge through its organizers and showcases prominent straight edge bands.

West Flanders was home to the H8000 (pronounced Hate-Thousand) hardcore punk scene during the 1990s. Bands within the scene took heavily from heavy metal, and followed straight edge and vegan lifestyles. Some bands helped to pioneer the development of metalcore and then later on melodic metalcore and deathcore. Some groups from the scene include Congress, Liar, Blindfold, Shortsight, Regression and Spirit of Youth. Good Life Recordings signed and released much of the music for the scene.

=== United Kingdom ===
According to NoEcho writer Ethan Stewart "the closest thing to a straight edge band for much of the [1980s] was Statement", a solo-project by the Apostles drummer Patrick "Rat" Poole. However, despite Poole being drug-free, vegan and having a massive influence on the development of hardline, he did not identify with the straight edge label at the time. Additionally, many groups from the UK punk and hardcore scene did include straight edge members, namely Napalm Death, Blitz and Heresy.

The first entirely straight edge band in the country was Steadfast, who formed in Durham in 1988. Despite originally being formed as a vehicle to annoy the members of the anarcho punk scene, the band eventually grew into a serious band. Following this, a number of additional straight edge bands began to form, including XdisciplineX, False Face, Headstong, Step One and Kickback. Nicolas Royles, drummer for Sore Throat, formed In Touch and Withstand around this time, which both morphed into No Way Out by 1990. This scene mostly was based in North East of England and Yorkshire and made up of musicians who became involved in the hardcore scene through skateboarding and the popularity of thrash metal. The bands were predominantly influenced by U.S. youth crew acts like Youth of Today and Gorilla Biscuits. Members of the existing punk and hardcore scenes in the country often reacted negatively to the straight edge bands, and on multiple occasions, fights occurred between the musicians and fans.

Most of the first wave of UK straight edge bands had broken up by 1991. However, a second wave began in the following years. Mostly based around Subjugation and Sure Hand Records, this wave saw members of many of the first wave bands form new bands and begin to embrace influences from heavy metal. The main location for this scene was the 1 in 12 Club, an anarchist club in Bradford, West Yorkshire, as groups like Unborn, Slavearc, Vengeance of Gaia and Withdrawn performed there frequently.

A UK straight edge scene featuring entirely new musicians developed in the 2010s as a part of the New Wave of British Hardcore. Mostly based around Leeds, the scene produced groups like Violent Reaction, Big Cheese, Insist, Unjust, Rapture, Regiment, True Vision and Shrapnel. A number of musicians from other UK hardcore bands were straight edge at this time, including Jimmy and Alex Wizard from Higher Power.

== X symbol ==
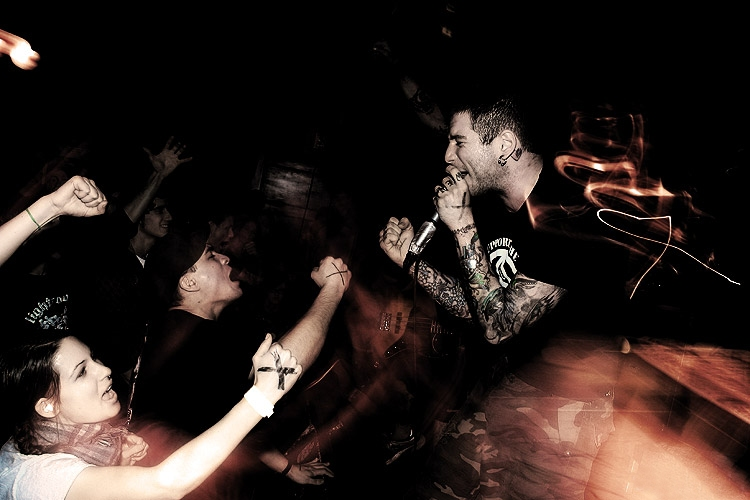
Italian straight edge band To Kill performing at a club

The letter X is the most known symbol of straight edge. It is sometimes worn as a marking on the back of both hands, although it can be displayed on other body parts as well. Some followers of straight edge put the symbol on clothing and pins, and many bands aligned with the culture incorporate it into their names. According to a series of interviews by journalist Michael Azerrad, the straight edge X can be traced to the Teen Idles' brief West Coast tour in 1980. The band's members were scheduled to play at San Francisco's Mabuhay Gardens, but when they arrived, club management discovered that they were all under the legal drinking age and would be denied entry to the club. As a compromise, management marked each of the members' hands with a large black X as a warning to the club's staff not to serve alcohol to the band.

Upon returning to Washington, D.C., the band suggested this same system to local clubs as a means to allow teenagers in to see musical performances without being served alcohol. The Teen Idles released a record in 1980 called Minor Disturbance with the cover shot being two hands with black Xs on the back. The mark soon became associated with the straight edge lifestyle. It can also be used by drinking establishments to note a patron as under the drinking age, regardless of their views towards drugs such as alcohol.

Later bands used the X symbol on album covers and other paraphernalia in a variety of ways. The cover of No Apologies by Judge shows two crossed gavels in the X formation. Other objects that have been used include shovels, baseball bats, and hockey sticks. A variation involving a trio of Xs is often used in flyers and tattoos. It can also be ironic, based on the fact that three Xs was popularized in cartoons and television shows to signify alcohol or poison. Moonshiners used an X to note how many times a particular batch of moonshine ran through the still, adding irony. The term is sometimes abbreviated by including an X with the abbreviation of the term "straight edge" to give "sXe". By analogy, hardcore punk is sometimes abbreviated to "hXc".

== Approaches ==
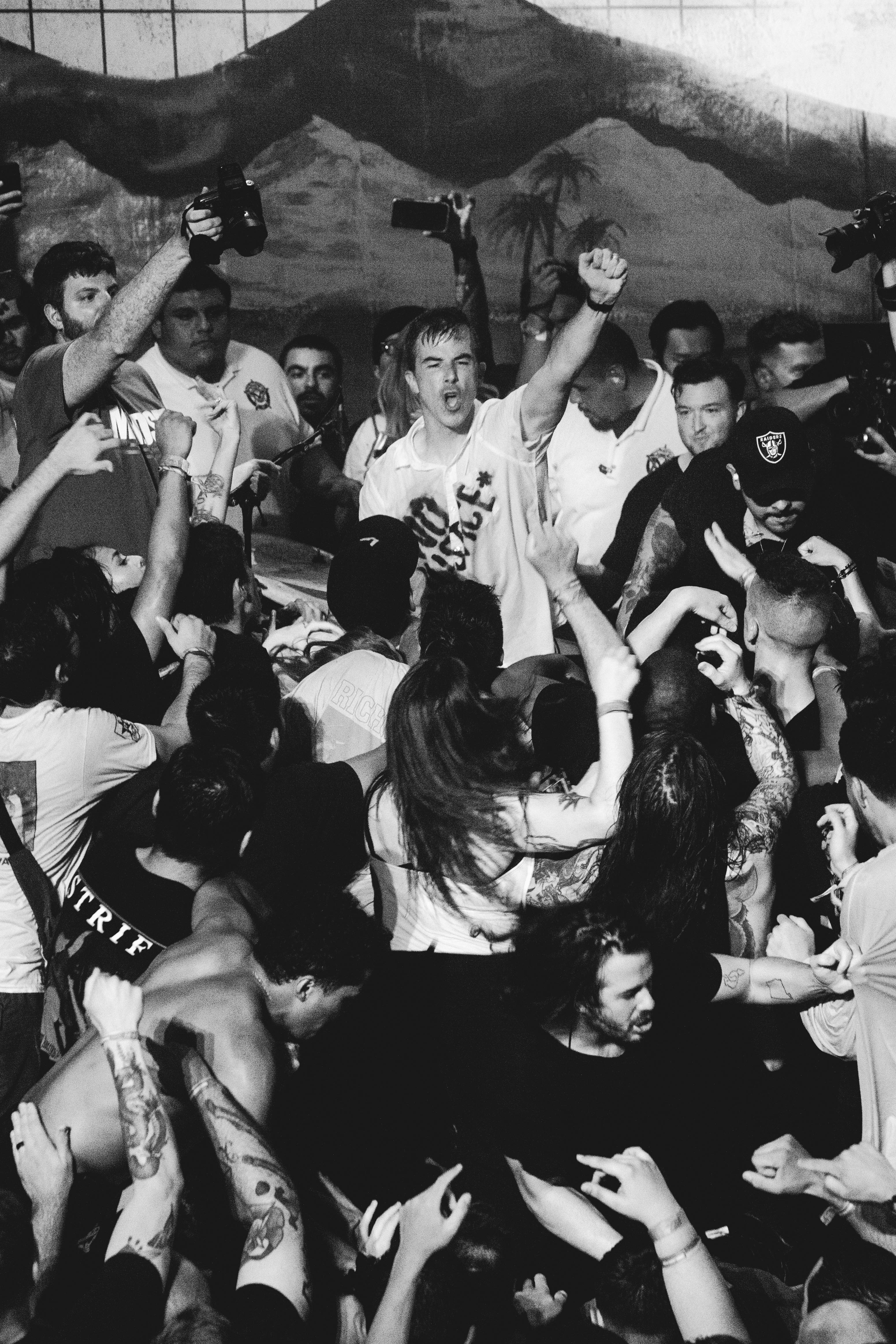
Boston straight edge band Have Heart's 2019 reunion show outside the Worcester Palladium had the highest attendance of any hardcore show in history.

While some straight edge groups are treated as a "gang" by law enforcement officials, a 2006 study found the vast majority of people who identify as straight edge are nonviolent. While the early hardcore punk scene in Washington, D.C., often is praised for its commitment to positive social change, both the youth crew movement of the 1980s and the vegan movement of the 1990s have drawn criticism. Straight edge has been approached with skepticism and hostility despite the less dogmatic and multifaceted character of contemporary straight edge.

== Veganism ==
By the late 1990s, many straight edge participants gave veganism the same degree of importance as abstinence from intoxicants, and some groups styled themselves as "vegan straight edge", sometimes abbreviated "xVx". Bands such as Earth Crisis and Vegan Reich emphasized animal rights and environmentalism as social justice issues. Perhaps owing to the "DIY" ethic of the punk subculture, some advocated direct action, and became associated with the radical groups Animal Liberation Front and the Earth Liberation Front. The US band Vegan Reich is most associated with the "Hardline" subculture, which espouses the sanctity of life, and draws connections between animal rights and anti-abortion activism. Members of the Hardline movement have been described as espousing Old Testament-style spirituality, militancy, and violence. Violent activism has been described as an "extreme minority" within the vegan straight edge movement.

Haenfler writes that straight edge participants see veganism as an extension of the movement's emphasis on positivity, much like its preference to reserve sex for emotionally meaningful relationships. They tend to focus more on personal responsibility and focus less on confronting systemic issues in society. However, veganism is not seen as a matter of personal purity; it is rooted in a strong belief in animal rights and rejection of the exploitation of animals. Some hold that veganism is "true straight edge", and their promotion of veganism and animal liberation has been described as evangelistic.

== See also ==
- List of people who follow a straight edge lifestyle
- List of straight edge bands
- National Edge Day
- Animal rights and punk subculture
- Teetotalism
- Temperance movement

== References and bibliography ==
- Andersen, Mark; Jenkins, Mark (2003). Dance of Days: Two Decades of Punk in the Nation's Capital. Akashic Books. ISBN 1-888451-44-0.
- Azerrad, Michael (2001). Our Band Could Be Your Life: Scenes from the American Indie Underground, 1981–1991. New York: Little, Brown and Company. ISBN 0-316-78753-1.
- Barlett, Thomas (2006). "Study Rock's Clean, Mean Movement". Chronicle of Higher Education. 53 (6).
- Blush, Steven (2001). George Petros (ed.). American Hardcore: A Tribal History (1st ed.). Feral House. ISBN 9780922915712.
- Blush, Steven (2010). George Petros (ed.). American Hardcore: A Tribal History (2nd ed.). Feral House. ISBN 9781932595895.
- Brown, Andy R., ed. (2018). "Modern Metal Genres". The Cambridge Companion to Metal Music. Cambridge University Press. pp. 213–215. ISBN 9781108991162.
- Cogan, Brian (2008). The Encyclopedia of Punk. New York: Sterling. ISBN 978-1-4027-5960-4.
- Davis, Erik (1995). "Hare Krishna Hard Core". Spin. 11 (5): 69–73.
- Goldfein, Josh (1989). "Straight and Narrow". Spin. 5 (1): 18.
- Haenfler, Ross (August 2004b). "Rethinking subcultural resistance". Journal of Contemporary Ethnography. 33 (4). Sage: 406–436. doi:10.1177/0891241603259809. S2CID 145602862.
- Haenfler, Ross (2006b). Straight Edge: Hardcore Punk, Clean Living Youth, and Social Change. Rutgers University Press. ISBN 0-8135-3851-3.
- Hannon, Sharon M. (2010). Punks: a guide to an American subculture. ABC-CLIO.
- Helton, Jesse J.; Staudenmeier, William J. (2002). "Re-imagining being 'straight' in straight edge". Contemporary Drug Problems. 29 (2): 445. doi:10.1177/009145090202900209. ISSN 0091-4509. S2CID 143410996.
- Kuhn, Gabriel (2010). Sober Living for the Revolution: Hardcore Punk, Straight Edge, and Radical Politics. PM Press. ISBN 978-1-60486-051-1.
- Mullaney, Jamie (2007). "'Unity Admirable But Not Necessarily Heeded:' Going Rates and Gender Boundaries in the Straight Edge Hardcore Music Scene". Gender & Society. 21 (3): 384–408. doi:10.1177/0891243207299615. S2CID 143931809.
- Mullaney, Jamie L. (March 6, 2014). "10. Negotiating Promiscuity | Straight Edge (sXe), Sex, and the Self" (PDF). In Weinberg, Thomas S.; Newmahr, Staci (eds.). Selves, Symbols, and Sexualities | An Interactionist Anthology. SAGE Publications. p. 135. ISBN 9781483323893.
- O'Hara, Craig (1999). The Philosophy of Punk: More Than Noise. AK Press. ISBN 1-873176-16-3.
- Rettman, Tony (2014). Straight Edge: A Clear-Headed Hardcore Punk History. Bazillion Points. p. 215. ISBN 9781935950127.
- Tsitsos, William (1999). "Rules of Rebellion: Slamdancing, Moshing, and the American Alternative Scene". Popular Music. 3 (18): 403. doi:10.1017/s0261143000008941. S2CID 159966036.
- Pieslak, Jonathan (2015). Radicalism and Music: An Introduction to the Music Cultures of al-Qa'ida, Racist Skinheads, Christian-Affiliated Radicals, and Eco-Animal Rights Militants. Wesleyan University Press. ISBN 9780819575852.
- Wood, Robert T. (1999). "Nailed to the X: A Lyrical History of Straightedge". Journal of Youth Studies. 2 (2): 133–151. doi:10.1080/13676261.1999.10593032.
- Wood, Robert T. (2003). "The Straightedge Youth Sub-Culture: Complexities of Subculture Identity". Journal of Youth Studies. 6 (1): 33–52. doi:10.1080/1367626032000068154. S2CID 145295766.
- Wood, Robert T. (2006). Straight Edge Youth: The Complexity and Contradictions of a Subculture. Syracuse, New York: Syracuse University Press. ISBN 0-8156-3127-8.
- Youth of Today (1988). We're Not In This Alone. New York: Caroline Records.
- Tsitos, William (2016). "An International Comparison of the Politics of Straight Edge". Music Sociology: Examining the Role of Music in Social Life. Routledge. pp. 202–210. ISBN 978-161205-312-7.
