= Downset. (album) =

1994 studio album by downset.

downset.

Studio album by downset.
- Released: July 12, 1994
- Recorded: 1994
- Studio: Silver Cloud Studios, Burbank, California
- Genre: Rapcore; rap metal; hardcore punk
- Length: 35:34
- Label: Mercury
- Producer: Roy Z; downset.

Downset. chronology
downset. (1994)	Do We Speak a Dead Language? (1996)

Singles from downset.
- 1. "Anger" Released: June 13, 1994; 2. "Downset" Released: 1995

downset. is the debut studio album by American rapcore band downset. The band's major label debut, it was released on July 12, 1994, by Mercury Records.

Professional ratings
Review scores
Source	Rating
AllMusic	4/5 stars
Collector's Guide to Heavy Metal	7/10
The Encyclopedia of Popular Music	4/5 stars
Kerrang!	4/5 stars

According to Rey Oropeza, the album has sold 275,000 copies worldwide.

== Track listing ==
All tracks are written by downset and Roy Z, except where noted.

No.	Title	Writer(s)	Length
1.	"Anger"	downset.	4:13
2.	"Ritual"		3:34
3.	"Take Em' Out"		2:40
4.	"Prositutionalized"		3:13
5.	"Downset"	downset.	3:02
6.	"My American Prayer"		5:25
7.	"Holding Hands"		3:15
8.	"About to Blast"		2:56
9.	"Breed The Killer"		2:51
10.	"Dying Of Thirst"		3:22
Total length:			35:34

== Personnel ==
Adapted from Tidal and liner notes.

downset.

- Rey Oropeza – vocals, songwriting
- James Morris – bass guitar, songwriting
- Chris Lee – drums, songwriting
- Brian "Ares" Schwarger – guitar, songwriting
- Rogelio "Roy" Lozano – guitar, songwriting

Production

- Roy Z. – production, mixing, engineering, songwriting (2–4, 6–10)
- Joe Floyd – mixing, engineering (on tracks 1, 3–5, 10)
- Sean Kenesie – mixing, engineering (on tracks 1, 3–5, 10)
- Shay Baby – mixing, engineering (on tracks 2, 6–9)

Artwork

Barry Greenhut – artwork, design
