= Downset. =

American rap metal band

downset.
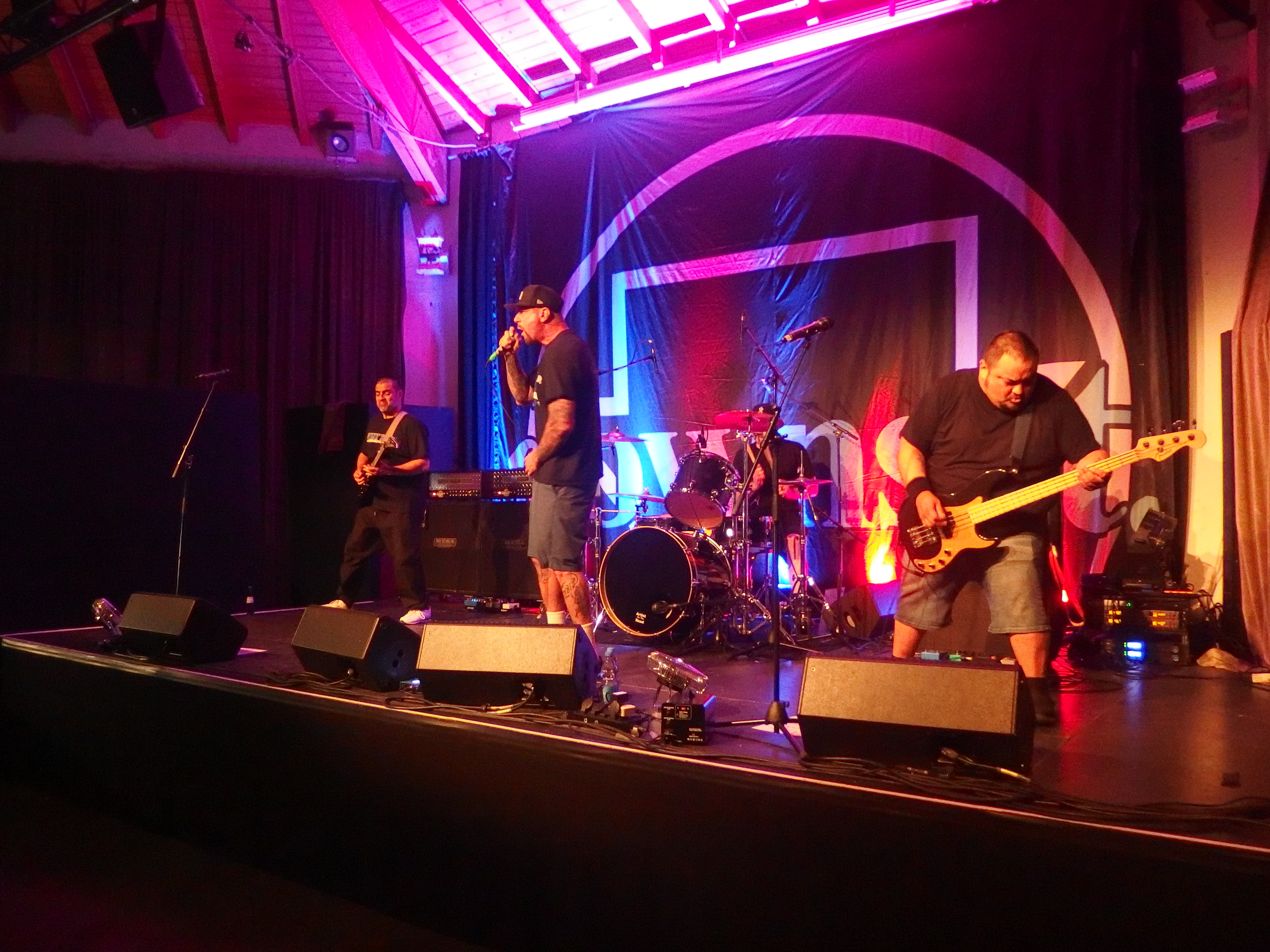
- Downset performing in Germany in 2023

Background information
- Also known as: Social Justice (1989-1992)
- Origin: Los Angeles, California, U.S.
- Genres: Rap metal; hardcore punk
- Years active: 1989–2009; 2013–present
- Labels: Theologian; Abstract; Mercury; Epitaph; Hawino; Nuclear Blast; End Hits
- Members: Joe Hyde; Roy Lozano; Renato Barbosa; Betto Cardoso
- Past members: Phillip Gonzales; Bobby Blood; Neil Roemer; Rey Oropeza; Jesse Garcia; Luis Garcia; Steve Sain; David Acosta; Don Ward; Brian "Ares" Schwager; Christopher "Krasp" Lee; Rico Villasenor; Chris Hamilton; James Morris

Downset (usually stylized as downset.) is an American rap metal band from Los Angeles, California. Originally called Social Justice, the band's music blends influences from rap, funk, hardcore punk, and metal with "socially aware lyrics."

== Band history ==
=== Formation and early releases (1989–1993) ===
The band's original moniker was Social Justice. They began as a hardcore punk band. The original lineup consisted of Rey Oropeza on vocals, Jesse Garcia on guitar, Steve Sain on guitar, David Acosta on bass, and Luis Garcia on drums. They released their debut album, Unity Is Strength, in 1989. The following year, Social Justice disintegrated, and Oropeza was the only member remaining. He formed a new lineup which consisted of Don Ward on guitar, Rogelio Lozano on guitar, James Morris on bass, and Christopher Lee on drums. The revamped lineup released the mini-album I Refuse to Lose in 1992. They were known for being one of the first hardcore bands to incorporate hip hop and funk influences into their music.

In 1992, Ward departed from the band, and he was replaced by guitarist Brian Schwager. Social Justice changed their name to Downset, and released the Our Suffocation demo in 1993. The album, which explored various social issues such as the death of lead singer Oropeza's father at the hands of the LAPD, was praised by critics. During this transition, they changed their sound by heavily incorporating rap metal and funk metal.

=== Mercury Records, downset. and Do We Speak a Dead Language? (1994–1998) ===
Downset in 1994

In 1994, Downset signed a deal with Mercury Records, a subsidiary of PolyGram, and released their self-titled effort in the same year. In 1994, downset began gaining popularity in Europe after touring there with Biohazard and Dog Eat Dog, followed by a tour with Pantera and The Almighty later that year. In early 1995, Downset returned to Europe with Sullen for a massive headlining tour. In 1995, they also appeared at some major rock festivals throughout the continent including Roskilde and Dynamo. In 1996, the band released their most commercially successful album, Do We Speak a Dead Language?, through Mercury.

=== Post-Mercury years, Check Your People and Universal (1998–2009) ===
After making their departure from Mercury Records, Downset were scooped up by Epitaph Records and released their third album, Check Your People, in 2000. In 2004, Downset released their fourth album, Universal, on an independent record label Hawino Records. In recognition of the band's album release on Epitaph Records, "Pure Trauma", taken from the album Check Your People, was included on the 2001 multi-artist compilation Punk-O-Rama Vol. 6. The band disbanded in 2009.

=== Reunion and One Blood (2013–2014) ===
On July 21, 2014, Downset's first new album in ten years, One Blood, was released worldwide.

=== Signing to Nuclear Blast and Maintain (2022) ===
After a period of prolonged inactivity, Downset announced in February 2022 that they had signed to Nuclear Blast Records, and announced plans for a new studio album as well as reissues of their demo singles "Anger/Ritual" and "About Ta Blast". On April 29, the band announced their new album, Maintain, would be released on June 10, 2022, and released the album's first single, "The Place to Be". The album sold 200 copies in its first week of sales.

== Legacy ==
Though Downset never experienced any mainstream success, and though its members came from an urban hardcore tradition rather than from metal, the band is still regarded as a noteworthy influence on the then-nascent nu metal and rap metal subgenres. In addition to headlining the second stage at Ozzfest in 1997, downset. toured with prominent bands such as Linkin Park, Pantera, Slayer, Metallica, Red Hot Chili Peppers, Korn, Snoop Dogg, Testament and Anthrax.

== Band members ==
Current

- Rogelio Lozano – guitar (1990–1994, 1999–2002, 2013, 2019–present)
- Renato Barbosa – bass (2024–present)
- Betto Cardoso – drums (2024–present)
- Joe Hyde – vocals (2024–present)

Former members

- Rey Oropeza – vocals (1989–2023)
- Jesse Garcia – guitar (1989–1990)
- Steve Sain – guitar (1989–1990)
- David Acosta – bass (1989–1990)
- Luis Garcia – drums (1989–1990)
- Don Ward – guitar (1990–1992)
- Christopher "Krasp" Lee – drums (1990–1999, 2001–2005, 2013)
- James Morris – bass (1990–2003, 2014–2019)
- Brian "Ares" Schwager – guitar (1992–2016)
- Chris Hamilton – drums (1999–2001, 2014–2019)
- Rico Villasenor – bass (2003–2005)
- Bobby Blood – drums (2019–2024)
- Phillip Gonzales – bass (2019–2024)
- Neil Roemer – vocals (2023–2024)

Former touring musicians

- Neil Roemer – vocals (2013)
- Johnathan Manhart – bass (2013)
- Dave Corsile – guitar (2000–2001); died 2023

== Discography ==
=== Albums ===
Social Justice

- Unity Is Strength (1989)

downset.

List of studio albums, with selected details, chart positions and sales amounts
Title	Details	Peak chart positions				Sales
Title	Details	US Heat.	AUT	GER	UK	Sales
downset.	Released: July 12, 1994; Label: Mercury; Format: CD, CS, LP	—	—	—	—	WW: 275,000
Do We Speak a Dead Language?	Released: September 9, 1996; Label: Mercury; Format: CD, CS	44	35	77	118	
Check Your People	Released: October 17, 2000; Label: Epitaph; Format: CD, LP	44	—	—	—	
Universal	Released: June 1, 2004; Label: Hawino; Format: CD	—	—	—	—	
One Blood	Released: July 21, 2014; Label: self-released; Format: CD	—	—	—	—	
Maintain	Released: June 10, 2022; Label: Nuclear Blast; Format: CD	—	—	—	—	
"—" denotes a recording that did not chart or was not released in that territory.

=== EPs ===
Social Justice

- I Refuse to Lose (1992)

downset.

- Our Suffocation (demo) (1994)
- Downset EP (1995)
- Generation of Hope (with Shootyz Groove) (1995)
- Live at Foundation's Forum (1995)
- No More Freedom in a Cage (1996)
- Eyes Shut Tight EP' (Live at CBGB's) (1997)
- Code Blue Coma (2000)
- Rarities (2000)

=== Singles ===
- "About Ta Blast" (1993)
- "Anger" (1994)
- "Downset" (1995)
- "Empower" (1996)
- "Pocket Full of Fatcaps" (1996)
- "Eyes Shut Tight" (1996)
- "Split with Mindbug 7" (1999)
- "Jumping Off" (2004)
- "One Blood" (2014)
- "The Place to Be" (2022)
