= Devious (band) =

Dutch metal band

Devious is a Dutch metal band from Hengelo, Overijssel, founded by Frank Schilperoort (drums) and Guido de Jongh (guitar). Devious has toured throughout Europe with Krisiun in 2006 and with Entombed and Merauder in 2009. Devious' latest release Wolfhagen came out in 2012.

== Band members ==
- Guido de Jongh, guitar (founding member)
- Frank Schilperoort, drums (founding member)
- Wouter, guitar (since 2000)
- Dennis Lusseveld, vocals (since 2011)

Former members

- Arnold oude Middendorp, vocals (2001–2004, 2008–2011)
- Sven van Toorn, bass (2001–2009)
- Coen Tabak, vocals (2004–2008)
- Daniël Centiago, bass (2009–2011)

== Discography ==
=== Wolfhagen ===
- Mixed and mastered: Soundlodge, Rhauderfehn, Germany.
- Release date: 11 May 2012.
- Label: self-published.

Track list:

1. One Man Horde
2. Sinner of Greed
3. Wolfhagen
4. Her Divine
5. Afterlife
6. Respiration of Fear 2012
7. Respiration of Fear (dnb/dubstep remix)

=== Vision ===
- Mixed and mastered: Split Second Sound, Amsterdam, Netherlands.
- Release date: 31 August 2009.
- Label: Deity Down Records.

Track list:

1. Heritage of the Reckless
2. False Identity
3. Respiration of Fear
4. Abide
5. Impulse Overload
6. Predefined
7. Validate
8. Disconnect

=== Domain ===
- Mixed and mastered: Ground Zero studio, Zutphen, Netherlands.
- Release date: 1 February 2007.
- Label: Deity Down Records.

Track list:

1. Entrance...
2. Room 302
3. Incantation of the Earthbound
4. Boundless Domain
5. Misanthropic Entities
6. Suoived Pt.II
7. The Repentance
8. Third World Suicide
9. Days of Disorder
10. Dead Cannibal Civilization
11. Shibito
12. Lowest in the Foodchain

=== Acts of rage ===
- Recorded at: Ground Zero studio, Zutphen, Netherlands.
- Release date: 7 July 2003.
- Label: Spitzenburg Records.

Track list:

1. Haunted
2. Acts of rage
3. Harlequin of perpetual destiny
4. I'll slice you into pieces
5. Suoived (introspection)
6. Conjuration of destruction
7. Inanimate
8. 5 Min.'s in decay
9. Excavation of the undead
10. Dragged below

=== Mini 2002 ===
- Recorded at: Rooftop studio, Enschede, Netherlands.
- Release date: 8 March 2002.
- Label: self-published.

Track list:

1. Nowhere but lost
2. Harlequin of perpetual destiny
3. 5 Min.'s in decay
4. I'll slice you into pieces
