= Don Fury =

American recording engineer and producer

- Origin: New York, U.S.
- Occupations: Recording engineer, record producer, mastering engineer
- Years active: 1984–present
- Label: Building Records

Don Fury is an American recording engineer and producer who owned three rehearsal and recording studios in New York City. He has recorded and produced music for a variety of punk and hardcore bands including GG Allin, Agnostic Front, Sick of It All, Youth of Today, Gorilla Biscuits, Madball, Warzone, Helmet, Into Another, and Quicksand. In 2008 Fury moved his studio to Troy, New York.

== Early life ==
Don Fury grew up on Long Island in New York.

== Career ==
In the late 1970s Fury moved to Manhattan and built a rehearsal studio on 17th Street named Roach, less than two blocks from punk club Max's Kansas City. The studio was used by punk pioneers The Voidoids, James Chance, The Stimulators, and the Bush Tetras. Inspired by Sam Phillips' Sun Studio in Memphis, Fury built a second studio on 18 Spring Street four blocks from punk club CBGB, where Sonic Youth rehearsed.

Fury recorded New York hardcore, punk, straight-edge and post-hardcore bands at the Spring Street studio including Agnostic Front, Sick of It All, Underdog, Youth of Today, Gorilla Biscuits, Wide Awake, Madball, Civ, Warzone, Helmet, Into Another, Yuppicide, S.F.A. and Quicksand, and Fury proposed the CBGB Hardcore Matinee to Carol Costa and Hilly Kristal. In 1996 Fury was represented by manager Sandy Roberton of World's End, and Fury and Roberton secured a subsidiary label deal for Fury's imprint Building Records with TVT Records, signing the progressive post-hardcore band Stillsuit.

Fury built a third studio named Cyclone Sound on Coney Island in Brooklyn, where he recorded cabaret-punk rockers The World Inferno Friendship Society and Celtic rockers Black 47. In 2008 Fury built a new studio in Troy, New York and recorded the bands After The Fall, Skeletons In The Piano, The Erotics, Murderers' Row, and Aficionado, and mixed and mastered recordings for Deep Throat (Italy), Volver (Guatemala), Remission (Chile), Radical Noise (Turkey), and Outright (Australia).

== Selected recordings ==
- Agnostic Front "United Blood" EP (independent release 1983)
- Agnostic Front "Victim in Pain" LP (Ratcage Records 1984)
- Gorilla Biscuits "Gorilla Biscuits" EP (Revelation Records 1988)
- Judge "New York Crew" EP (Schism Records 1988)
- Gorilla Biscuits "Start Today" LP (Revelation Records 1989)
- Helmet "Born Annoying" EP (Amphetamine Reptile Records 1989)
- Madball "Ball of Destruction" EP (In Effect Records 1989)
- Burn "Burn" EP (Revelation Records 1990)
- Quicksand "Quicksand" EP (Revelation Records 1990)
- Born Against "Eulogy" EP (Vermiform Records 1990)
- Born Against "Born Against" EP (Vermiform Records 1990)
- Citizens Arrest "A Light In The Darkness" EP (Wardance Records 1990)
- Shelter "No Compromise" EP (Equal Vision Records 1990)
- Sick of It All "We Stand Alone" EP (In Effect Records 1991)
- S.F.A. "So What" LP (Wreck-Age Records 1991)
- Yuppicide "Fear Love" LP (Wreck-Age Records 1991)
- Bad Trip "Fear and Loathing" LP (Wreck-Age Records 1992)
- Madball "Droppin' Many Suckers" EP (Wreck-Age Records 1992)
- Cat Power "Headlights" single (The Making Of Americans 1993)
- Yuppicide "Shinebox" LP (Wreck-Age Records 1993)
- Snapcase "Lookinglasself" LP (Victory Records Records 1993)
- GG Allin "Brutality and Bloodshed for All" LP (Alive Records 1993)
- Mind Over Matter "Security" LP (Wreck-Age Records 1994)
- Dropdead "落とす死" LP (Selfless Records 1994)
- Stillsuit "Green Spock Ears" EP (Wreck-Age Records 1995)
- Yuppicide "Dead Man Walking" LP (Wreck-Age Records 1995)
- Bad Trip "Buzzy" LP (Wreck-Age Records 1995)
- Voice Of Reason "New Beginnings" LP (Triple Crown Records 1999)
- Indecision "To Live And Die In NYC" EP (Exit Records 1999)
- Motor Betty "Redline" (Skeet Records 1999)
- Locked In A Vacancy "Ethos" EP (Purity Records 2002)
- Wide Awake "CT Hardcore" EP (Schism Records 1988)
