= We're Not in This Alone =

We're Not In This Alone

Studio album by Youth of Today
- Released: June 15, 1988
- Recorded: 1988
- Genre: Hardcore punk
- Length: 19:58
- Label: Caroline
- Producer: John Porcelly, Ray Cappo

Youth of Today chronology
Break Down the Walls (1987)	We're Not In This Alone (1988)	Youth of Today EP (1990)

Alternative cover
- Cover of 1997 Revelation Records CD/LP reissue

Professional ratings
Review scores
Source	Rating
AllMusic	3/5 stars

We're Not in This Alone is the third and final full-length studio album by New York hardcore punk band Youth of Today. It was originally released by Caroline Records in 1988.

== Background and songs ==
Youth of Today had broken up briefly in 1988, with lead singer and co-founder Ray Cappo briefly relocating to India to pursue his interest in Hare Krishna, while guitarist and co-founder Porcell (John Porcelly) got out his frustrations with both the breakup of the band and what he saw as negative elements in the scene, with the project band Project X, and with Judge. The breakup was short-lived; the group reconvened with former WarZone bassist Walter Schreifels and drummer Sammy Siegler not long afterward, hence Cappo's declaration of "We're back!" at the beginning of the album's opening track, "Flame Still Burns".

One notable track, "No More", is a condemnation of the meat-industry. Youth of Today made a low-budget music video for the song, incorporating footage of an abattoir acquired from PETA, but it is unlikely that the clip ever aired on MTV.

Another track from the album, "Live Free", started life as an unreleased Project X song, "Can't Keep Me Down" - an almost full-circle irony, since Project X's best known song, "Straight Edge Revenge", was a song first written by John Porcelly for Youth Of Today, but rejected by Cappo because he found the lyrics to be too militant.

One other song, "Understand", is a rerecording of a song Youth Of Today first recorded and released on the Revelation Records compilation album New York City Hardcore: The Way It Is, two years earlier.

The version of the album with "REMIX" sticker.

== Recording and release ==
The album was recorded at the Chung King House of Metal in New York City, a studio Porcell would later use for the first attempt at a Judge full-length. In a foreshadowing of the problems Judge would later have with their album, the first mix to be released by Caroline was notoriously poor-sounding and muddy. After complaints from fans, Caroline remixed and re-pressed the album, releasing the new copies with the same cover artwork, but now having a large REMIX sticker affixed to the front. Caroline did not recall the 1st mix and so copies with the original mix still existed in record stores into the early 1990s. This 2nd mix was also licensed to We Bite records in Germany, who also released it on CD for Europe.

Disgusted with the black eye the original mix gave Youth of Today's legacy, Cappo and Porcell regained the rights to the album from Caroline in 1996, took the multi-track master tapes and remixed the entire album for a proper release on Revelation Records in 1997. This 3rd and final mix was also given completely new cover artwork upon its reissue. Newer vinyl pressings of the album on Revelation since 2012 have kept the 1996 Cappo/Porcell remix, but restored the original Caroline Records cover, label and insert art (with Revelation's type logo replacing Caroline's).

== Track listing ==
All songs written and composed by Ray Cappo and John Porcelly.

1. "Flame Still Burns"
2. "Slow Down"
3. "Choose to Be"
4. "Put It Aside"
5. "Wake Up and Live"
6. "No More"
7. "What Goes Around"
8. "Potential Friends"
9. "A Time We'll Remember"
10. "Live Free"
11. "Understand"
12. "Prejudice"
13. "Keep It Up"

== Personnel ==
Band

- Ray Cappo – lead vocals, production
- Porcell – guitars, production, backing and gang vocals
- Walter Schreifels – bass, backing and gang vocals
- Sammy Siegler – drums, backing and gang vocals

Additional personnel

- Les "Paws" Davis – sound engineer, associated producer
- Phil "pa" Austin – mastering
- Dylan Schreifels – backing and gang vocals
- Luke Abbey – backing and gang vocals
- Raymond "Raybies" Barbieri – backing and gang vocals
- Alex Brown – backing and gang vocals, photography (live photos)
- Tom Rockafeller – backing and gang vocals, photography (live photos)
- JJ Gonson – photography (live photos)
- Murray Bowles – photography (live photos)
- Melora Creager – cover concept, cover photography
- Tom Hughes – design realization
- Ellie Hughes – design realization
