= New York Crew =

EP by Judge
- Released: 1988
- Genre: Hardcore punk
- Labels: Schism Records; Revelation

Judge chronology
New York Crew (1988)	Chung King Can Suck It (1989)

New York Crew is an EP released by the New York City hardcore band Judge. The record was released on guitarist John Porcelly's record label, Schism Records, in 1988. The record was then later repressed by Revelation Records.

At the time of recording and release, Judge was a two-man project, featuring both John "Porcell" Porcelly (at the time of Youth Of Today) and former Death Before Dishonor drummer Mike "Judge" Ferraro. Porcell played the guitar and bass tracks on the record, whilst Mike played drums as well as doing the vocal tracks (not both at the same time). The EP only took about five hours to complete, including the mixing.

The following year, in 1989, as well as re-pressing the EP onto vinyl, the tracks also appeared as bonus tracks on the end of CD version of the band's LP, Bringin' It Down, released by Revelation Records. In 2005, Revelation Records re-released the tracks again, this time as part of the band's discography, entitled What It Meant: The Complete Discography.

== Track listing ==
All tracks are written by Judge, except where noted.

No.	Title	Writer(s)	Length
1.	"Fed Up!"		1:58
2.	"In My Way"		1:58
3.	"I've Lost..."		1:46
4.	"New York Crew"		2:19
5.	"Warriors"	Blitz	2:52
Total length:			10:44

== Personnel ==
- John Porcelly - guitar, bass
- Mike "Judge" Ferraro - vocals, drums
- Don Fury - engineering, mixing
- Porcelly, Ferraro - mixing, producing

== Pressing information ==
=== Schism Records ===
Schism Records #2 - 1988

- 1988 - 1st Press:
  - 1000 black vinyl, white labels and printed inner sleeve.
- 1988 - 2nd Press:
  - 1000 black vinyl, yellow labels and printed inner sleeve.
- 1988 - 3rd Press:
  - 1000 black vinyl, yellow labels and separate lyric sheet.

==== Difference between pressings ====
Both the first and second presses feature the gang vocals "You Lost My Respect" as the song In My Way opens, the 3rd press does not have this as a different mix was used due to the original being lost when the pressing plant went out of business.

Also the matrix changed from "82 and on" to "We Miss Kellogs". This version was later used on the first presses of the Revelation Records release.

=== Revelation Records ===
Revelation Records #14 - 1989 - n/a

- 1989 - 1st Press:
  - 1000 blue vinyl, orange sleeve, orange lyric sheet
  - 4000 black vinyl, orange sleeve, orange lyric sheet
- Later Presses:
  - black vinyl, yellow paper sleeve, white lyric sheet
  - black vinyl, yellow glossy sleeve, white lyric sheet
- 2025 Press:
  - 330 clear vinyl with purple splatter - REVHQ Exclusive
  - 330 opaque purple vinyl - Retail Store Exclusive
  - 1100 opaque pink vinyl

==== Difference between pressings ====
The first and several later presses used the same plate used on the third press of the original Schism Records release. This is evident as the matrix is exactly the same, reading "Schism-2 A" and "Schism-2 B" on respective sides as well as "We Miss Kellogs".

The colour of the sleeve in which the record was packaged changed from orange to yellow between the early and later presses.

Also at some point between presses, Revelation Records moved from New Haven, Connecticut to Huntington Beach, California. The earlier presses feature the New Haven address while later presses have the Huntington Beach address.
