= Chung King Can Suck It =

Studio album by Judge
- Released: 1989
- Recorded: 1989 at Chung King House of Metal, New York City
- Genre: Hardcore punk
- Length: 21:52
- Label: Revelation
- Producer: No producer credit taken

Judge chronology
New York Crew (1988)	Chung King Can Suck It (1989)	Bringin' It Down (1989)

Alternate cover

Chung King Can Suck It is a limited-pressing colored vinyl album by New York City band Judge, containing the original version of what was to be the Bringin' It Down album. The title of the album is a direct insult to the Chung King recording studio in New York City (then known as Chung King House of Metal).

== Album history ==
Judge had gone into Chung King with only one three-day weekend of studio time block-booked in order to record their first album, since band members John Porcelly and Sammy Siegler were set to tour with their main band Youth of Today in Europe later that month. The studio was home to many of the popular (and now legendary) rap acts of the day, including the Beastie Boys, Run-DMC and LL Cool J; Youth Of Today had recorded their third album We're Not in This Alone at the same studio earlier in the year, so Porcelly and Siegler were already familiar with the place. According to a 2005 interview with Judge guitarist Porcell in AMP, all three of those acts had already been using three of the four separate facilities in the studio complex, leaving Judge with what was at the time the least technologically advanced of the four rooms. To complicate matters, the recording engineer the band had been assigned by the studio was a full-blown cocaine addict – an irony given Judge's militant anti-drug lyrics and moral code. During the second day of the sessions, the engineer on duty failed to show up for work, forcing the band to work with another studio staff engineer totally unaccustomed to recording punk rock music.

After the sessions were completed, Porcell and Siegler listened to the finished mixes while on the Youth of Today European tour and came to the conclusion that while the performances were good, the recordings were not up to the standards of what they had done in the past with Youth of Today. The drum tracks in particular do not have the punch typical of other Revelation releases at the time, and the overall mix is considered to be thin. A phone call to lead singer Mike "Judge" Ferarro confirmed that he too was unhappy with the finished album, and the group chose to shelve the session and start over in a different studio. Unfortunately for Revelation, label owner Jordan Cooper had already paid for the mastering of the record and the plating of the vinyl stampers – a point in the manufacture of record too late to fully prevent the release of an album, especially for Revelation Records, which was then still a small independent label that Cooper was running out of his home.

With advance orders already coming in for the as-yet unreleased album, Revelation decided to press a limited run of 100 white-vinyl copies of the album, assigning it catalog number REV:-1 (negative one), and sending these copies to tide over fans who had advance ordered Bringin' It Down. As is customary the record pressing plant produced a 10% overrun of the album and as a result 110 copies were delivered. Each copy has its number stamped on the bottom corner of the back of the sleeve however the printing on the jacket notes a pressing run of 100 so with the additional 10, those extra sleeves had the "100" altered to say "110". This record has been much sought after by collectors ever since.

Judge then scheduled time at Normandy Studios in Rhode Island – the same studio where The Cro-Mags recorded their second album Best Wishes in 1988 – to record a proper version of their first album, Bringin' It Down. The two albums are similar in track listing for the first eight songs; Chung King... features two songs, "Holding On" and "No Apologies", that were not rerecorded for Bringin' It Down; "Where It Went", written after the Chung King... sessions, takes their place.

The Chung King Can Suck It album remained a rarity (in spite of two different bootleg editions of the album), and was sought after both for its collectibility and the two rare Judge songs it contained, until 2005, when Revelation compiled all of Judge's recorded output – Chung King Can Suck It included – for the CD What It Meant: The Complete Discography. In May 2015 a copy became the most expensive sale on Discogs.com, fetching $6,048, a record that stood for a year until David Bowie's second album, David Bowie, sold for $6,826.

However, on November 20, 2024 Revelation Records announced a remastered version of the record and a vinyl repressing for the first time in 35 years, which includes some new photos by Jeffrey Ladd and a reversed-out version of the original white album cover. This remastered version also marks as the 200th release on Revelation Records.

== Track listing ==
1. "Take Me Away"
2. "Bringin' It Down"
3. "Hold Me Back"
4. "Give It Up"
5. "The Storm"
6. "Hear Me"
7. "Like You"
8. "I've Lost"
9. "Holding On"
10. "No Apologies"

== Musical personnel ==
- Mike Ferarro – vocals
- Porcell – guitar, backing vocals
- Sammy Siegler – drums, backing vocals
- Jimmy Yu – bass
- Lukey Luke – backing vocals
- Alex Brown – backing vocals
- Tom Capone – backing vocals
- Kevin Egan – backing vocals
- Jay Anarchy – backing vocals

== No producer or engineering credit ==
No formal producer or engineering credit is given on either the original album sleeve or in the CD booklet of What It Meant. On Chung King Can Suck It, the producer credit is given as "He Who Can Suck It", and no engineering credit is given. In the liner notes of What It Meant, the credits are more blunt: The producer credit reads "Not produced" and the engineering credit reads "Engineered by some cokehead loser." If the album had been released in a proper manner, guitarist John Porcell would have taken credit or co-credit for producing the album, as he did with all of Judge's recorded output.
