= Mantra (Shelter album) =

Studio album by Shelter
- Released: August 8, 1995
- Genre: Melodic hardcore, hardcore punk, Krishnacore
- Length: 30:29
- Label: Roadrunner, Supersoul
- Producer: Tom Soares, John "Porcell" Porcelly

Shelter chronology
Attaining The Supreme (1993)	Mantra (1995)	Beyond Planet Earth (1997)

Professional ratings
Review scores
Source	Rating
AllMusic	3/5 stars
Drowned in Sound	9/10

Mantra is an album by New York City hardcore punk band Shelter. Released in 1995, it was the band's first album for Roadrunner.

Lyrically the album focuses mainly on Hare Krishna religious philosophy and social commentary on Western civilization — including a manifesto entitled Supersoul in the album's booklet, authored by band's frontman Ray Cappo. The first song, "Message of the Bhagavad", is introduced by an excerpt of a Bhagavad Gita verses reading.

Mantra was distributed in Brazil featuring two bonus tracks, expanding the listing from 11 to 13. Howerever, the lyrics for tracks #12 and #13 were not included in the booklet. By the time of the release, the band hadn't played live in the country yet, which happened for the first time in 1996.

== Critical reception ==
Trouser Press wrote that Cappo "is an articulate and principled spokesman for transcendental thought set to a tough 4/4 beat." In a retrospective review, Ox-Fanzine called Mantra "a tame rock album from another time."

== Track listing ==
All tracks are written by Ray Cappo except when noted.

No.	Title	Writer(s)	Length
1.	"Message of the Bhagavat"		3:00
2.	"Civilized Man"	Cappo, Graham Land	2:37
3.	"Here We Go"		2:38
4.	"Appreciation"		2:08
5.	"Empathy"		3:33
6.	"Not the Flesh"		2:45
7.	"Chance"		1:15
8.	"Mantra"		3:09
9.	"Surrender to Your T.V."	Cappo, Brian Christener	2:32
10.	"Letter to a Friend"	Graham Land	3:19
11.	"Metamorphosis"		3:33
Total length:			30:29

Brazilian and reissue bonus tracks
No.	Title	Writer(s)	Length
12.	"Progressive Man"		4:23
13.	"We Can Work It Out"	John Lennon, Paul Mccartney	2:23
Total length:			37:15

== Credits ==
Band

- Ray Cappo – vocals, lyrics
- Porcell – guitars, additional production, mixing
- Adam Blake – bass
- Dave Dicenso – drums

Others

- Sri Kesava (Baby Gopal) – backing vocals
- Tom Soares – backing vocals
- Boston Bhakta Program – backing vocals
- Joe Tomlinson – backing vocals
- A. C. Bhaktivedanta Swami Prabhupada – spiritual representation

Production

- Tom Soares – production
- Greg Calbi – mastering
- Tom Soares – mixing
- Tom Soares – sound engineer
- Fred Bortolotti – sound engineer (assistant)
- Howie Abrams – A&R
- Lego/Cut The Fat – art direction, design concept, photography
- Betty Swollocks – design
- Ken Salerno – photography (back cover)
