= Project X (band) =

American hardcore punk/youth crew band

- Origin: New York City, New York
- Genres: Hardcore punk; youth crew
- Years active: 1987
- Label: Schism
- Past members: John Porcelly; Alex Brown; Walter Schreifels; Sammy Siegler

Project X was a short-lived hardcore punk/youth crew band from New York City, and also the name of their only release, being a five-track EP. The band consisted of members of other prominent NYC hardcore bands Gorilla Biscuits, Youth of Today, Side by Side and Judge.

The record had a pressing of 500, and according to the band's bio on Bridge Nine Records' website, the majority of the records sold out at a gig in Connecticut. The record was out of print for 18 years (although it was illegally bootlegged more than once during that time), but was finally re-released in 2005 on Bridge Nine Records.

The 7-inch remained Project X's only recorded output. So when Porcelly as a joke put Project X – The Edge of Quarrel LP on his Maximum RocknRoll playlist during a San Francisco visit, record collectors began searching high and low for this fabled LP, but alas, it never existed. The band did however write one song that was only performed live, "Can't Keep Me Down". Later the lyrics were changed, and it became the Youth of Today song "Live Free" on the band's We're Not in This Alone album.

The band played few shows, estimated as low as five. These included some on the east coast of the United States, including Irving Plaza, and a few during Youth of Today's European tour in 1989. The band played again a couple of times in 2015 while touring with Gorilla Biscuits.

== Former members ==
- Alex Brown ("Kid Hard") - guitar
- John Porcelly ("Slam") - vocals
- Walter Schreifels ("N.D.") - bass guitar
- Sammy Siegler ("The Youth") - drums

== Discography ==
- Project X (1987)
