= Judge (band) =

American hardcore punk band

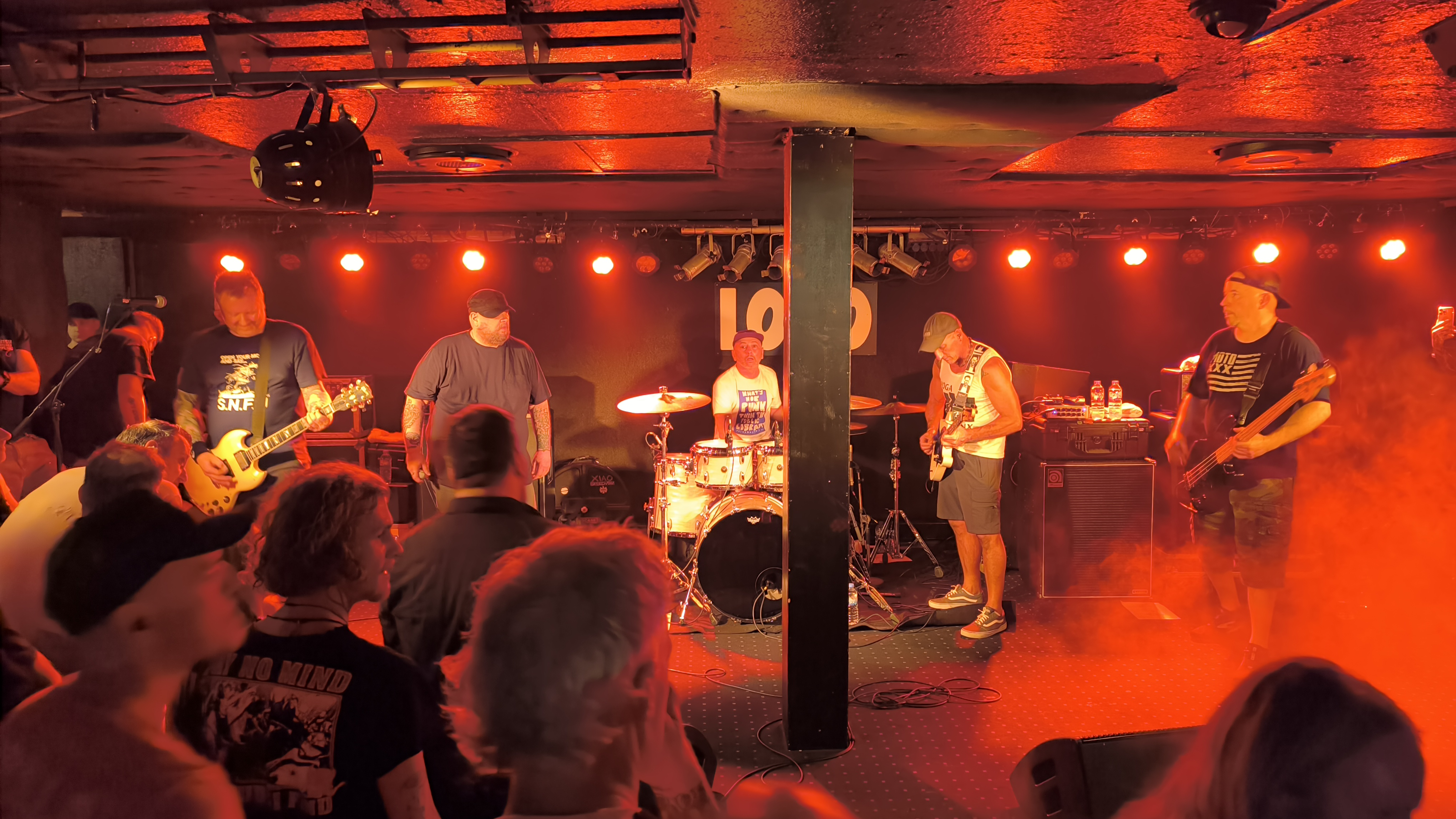
- Judge (2026)

Background information
- Origin: New York City
- Genres: Hardcore punk; tough guy hardcore
- Years active: 1987–1991; 2013–present
- Labels: Revelation; Schism
- Members: Mike Ferraro; John Porcell; Sammy Siegler; Charlie Garriga; Matt Pincus
- Past members: Luke Abbey; Jimmy Yu; Lars Weiss; Ryan Hoffman

Judge is a New York hardcore punk band formed in 1987 by Youth of Today guitarist John "Porcell" Porcelly and former Youth of Today drummer Mike "Judge" Ferraro.

== History ==
Their first release was a 7-inch EP on Porcell's label Schism (which he ran along with Side by Side/Gorilla Biscuits guitar player Alex Brown) entitled New York Crew. The record featured five songs, one of which was a cover of "Warriors" by the British oi!/punk band Blitz. On this recording, the band was merely a two-piece, featuring Porcell on bass and guitar, and Ferraro on vocals and drums. But with the addition of bass-player Jimmy Yu (of Mike's former band Death Before Dishonor, which eventually evolved into Supertouch) and drummer "Lukey" Luke Abbey (Warzone/Gorilla Biscuits), they got together a fully functional live line-up.

In terms of their sound, Judge's music featured very metal-influenced riffing, but remained close to its hardcore roots without leaning too hard into heavy metal, similar to bands like Agnostic Front and D.R.I.

The band received criticism due to their militant straight edge lyrics, especially from fanzines like San Francisco's Maximum Rock'N'Roll. The militant lyrics were a conscious move on the band's part in response to bands like Youth of Today, who in reality featured positive messages in their music, receive backlash for being "too militant." To combat this, they decided to intentionally provoke critics and create "the most militant Straight Edge band imaginable." Mike Ferraro has later on admitted that provocation was an important aim for the band.

In January 1989, with a new line-up of Sammy Siegler (Side by Side/Youth of Today/Project X etc.) on drums and Matt Pincus on bass, the band proceeded to record their full-length LP Bringin' It Down for Revelation Records at Chung King Studios in New York City. The recording was finished, but the band were so unhappy with the result that they decided to scrap it and re-record it at Normandy Sound in Rhode Island, where the Cro-Mags had recorded their Best Wishes album. Revelation did however put out a limited pressing of the original recording, fittingly titled Chung King Can Suck It. It was given to people who had pre-ordered the record, and with only 110 copies pressed (all on white vinyl), it is one of the most sought-after hardcore records in existence, going for as much as $6,600 on online auction sites such as eBay. Eventually, Bringin' It Down was released in 1989. Judge continued touring up until 1991, and even released another 7-inch EP, There Will Be Quiet, featuring "The Storm" and "Forget This Time" (the CD-version also contains a cover version of "When the Levee Breaks", originally by Led Zeppelin).

In May 2013, Judge reunited and played two shows in New York City. In 2014 and 2015, the band continued to play shows in United States as well as in South America and Europe.

== Careers after Judge ==
John Porcelly went on to tour and record with Hare Krishna hardcore band Shelter (featuring Ray Cappo of Youth of Today, as well as a revolving line-up of more and less well-known hardcore musicians, including Tom Capone of Bold and Quicksand, and Vic DiCara of Beyond, Inside Out, and 108). Porcelly later started the bands Never Surrender and Last of the Famous, and ran a record label called Fight Fire with Fire and the website TrueTillDeath.com, but all these projects seem to be either scrapped or inactive. He played with the reunited Bold in 2005–06, and a book chronicling all issues of his fanzine Schism was also released in late 2005.

Mike Ferraro (musician) (not to be confused with television and filmmaker Mike Judge) formed the band Mike Judge & Old Smoke with Judge roadie Todd Schwartz, a band playing Neil Young-inspired acoustic as well as guitar driven music. They released a 12-inch "Sights on Revelation Records in 1993. In his free time, Ferraro now raises chickens on a family farm in West Virginia.

Sammy Siegler played in several late 1980s/early 1990s hardcore bands, either regularly or as a replacement. In the mid-late 1990s he recorded and toured with the band CIV, featuring Anthony Civarelli and Arthur Smilios of Gorilla Biscuits. He has also appeared in Shelter, and major label rock band Rival Schools, featuring Walter Schreifels (also of Gorilla Biscuits, as well as Quicksand and several other bands) He recorded Glassjaw first full-length. In 2005 he joined Limp Bizkit as temporary replacement for drummer John Otto.

Matt Pincus is the Founder and former CEO of Songs Music Publishing which, until its sale in 2017, was the leading contemporary independent music publisher in the United States. SONGS clients included The Weeknd, Lorde, Diplo, DJ Mustard, and many other songwriters in all genres of music. In 2017, SONGS was acquired by Kobalt Music Publishing.

Jimmy Yu became a Chan/Zen Buddhist monk in 1991 under the name Guogu, and now teaches Buddhism and meditation under the direction of Chan/Zen Master Sheng Yen. Yu is currently an Assistant Professor of Religion at Florida State University. Yu received his Ph.D. from Princeton University's Department of Religion in 2008. Yu teaches courses in East Asian religious traditions, specializing in Chinese and Japanese Buddhism and late imperial Chinese cultural history. His research interests include the cultural history of the body, Buddhist monasticism, Chan/Zen Buddhism, and popular religions within the broader context of fifteenth to seventeenth centuries China. Here is a 2008 Double Cross Hardcore fanzine interview with Jimmy Yu in which he talks about growing up in the hardcore scene.

== Members ==
=== Current members ===
- Mike Ferraro – vocals (1987–1991, 2013–present), drums (1987)
- John Porcell – guitar 1987–1991, 2013–present, bass (1987)
- Sammy Siegler – drums (1989–1991, 2013–present)
- Charlie Garriga – guitar (2013–present)
- Matt Pincus – bass (1989–1991, 2013–present)

=== Former members ===
- Luke Abbey – drums (1988–1989)
- Jimmy Yu – bass (1988–1989)
- Lars Weiss – guitar (1990–1991)
- Ryan Hoffman – guitar (1991)

== Discography ==
=== Studio albums ===
- Chung King Can Suck It (1989)
- Bringin' It Down (1989)

=== EPs ===
- New York Crew (1988)
- There Will Be Quiet... (1991)

=== Compilation albums ===
- What It Meant: The Complete Discography (2005)
- What We Said... And Where It Went (1995)

=== Bootlegs ===
- Revelation Can Suck It (1992)
- No Apologies: The Chung King Sessions LP (1992)
- Vivo En WNYU (1992)
