= Supersoul Records =

- Founder: Ray Cappo
- Country of origin: United States

Super Soul Records is a record label founded by Ray Cappo (Better Than a Thousand, Shelter & Youth of Today) that was distributed through Roadrunner Records. Notable releases were by Shelter (The Purpose The Passion) and Vision of Disorder.

== See also ==
- List of record labels
