= The Search: 1985–1989 =

Compilation album by Bold
- Released: July 12, 2005
- Recorded: December 1985 to February 1989
- Genre: Hardcore punk
- Length: 66:22
- Label: Revelation
- Producer: Bold, Mike Trouchon

Bold chronology
Looking Back (1991)	The Search: 1985–1989 (2005)

The Search: 1985–1989 is a retrospective CD from American hardcore punk band Bold recorded at the Revelation Records studio.

The CD contains the band's entire recorded output: Their first 7-inch EP Join The Fight (1985), which was recorded under the name Crippled Youth, their full-length debut album Speak Out (1988), their second and final album Looking Back (recorded 1989, released 1991), three tracks that appeared either on compilations or on the original CD reissue of Speak Out, and two previously unreleased recordings. The recordings are presented with the album's track listings in their original running order, but with each release presented on the CD in reverse order of release, so that Looking Back starts the anthology off and the Crippled Youth 7-inch finishes it.

== Track listing ==
1. Running Like Thieves – 3:20
2. You're The Friend I Don't Need – 4:01
3. Always Try – 2:37
4. Looking Back – 2:13
5. Hateful – 2:49
6. Speak Out – 2:58
7. Today We Live – 4:01
8. Wise Up – 2:15
9. Having My Say – 2:47
10. Talk Is Cheap – 1:41
11. Nailed To The X – 2:03
12. Now Or Never – 1:54
13. Always Try – 2:38
14. Clear – 2:39
15. Intro – 1:38
16. Change Within – 2:00
17. Accept The Blame – 2:29
18. Wise Up – 2:20
19. Still Strong – 1:46
20. Search – 2:25
21. Strength Through Hope – 2:15
22. Talk Is Cheap – 1:33
23. Always Try – 2:29
24. Walk Tall, Walk Straight – 0:48
25. Positive Scene – 1:09
26. Can't You See – 1:26
27. Not Just Talk – 1:38
28. Respect – 1:17
29. Choice – 0:38
30. Stand Together – 0:11
31. K-town Mosh Crew – 1:11
32. United We Stand – 1:13
- Tracks 1–7 released as the LP Looking Back in 1991. Tracks 1, 2, 5 and 7 were previously released with different mixes as a self-titled 7-inch EP in 1989.
- Track 8 from the compilation The Way It Is (1988)
- Track 9 from the original CD version of Speak Out (1988)
- Tracks 10–20 released as the LP Speak Out (1988)
- Track 21 unreleased song from the Speak Out sessions.
- Track 22 from the compilation 7-inch Together (1987)
- Track 23 previously unreleased, intended for the compilation Changing Of Leaves.
- Tracks 24–32 released as the Join The Fight EP under the name Crippled Youth

== Musicians ==
- Matt Warnke - Vocals
- John "Zulu" Zuluaga - Guitar
- Tim Brooks - Bass
- Drew Cardellichio - Drums
- Tom Capone - Guitar (tracks 1–7 only)
