= Ron Perry (music executive) =

American music executive

- Occupation: Music industry executive
- Years active: 2004–present
- Employer: Columbia Records
- Title: Chairman and CEO

Ron Perry is an American music executive. Since January 2018, Perry has served as the chairman and CEO of Columbia Records. Perry was previously the president of Songs Music Publishing.

== Columbia Records (2018–present) ==
Perry was appointed chairman and CEO of Columbia Records in January 2018. Under his leadership, Columbia has signed Miley Cyrus, Lil Nas X, Rosalía, BTS, Jennie Kim, Addison Rae, Central Cee, Ella Langley, Megan Moroney, the Kid Laroi, Baby Keem, Blink-182, Labrinth, Lil Peep, Polo G, Dominic Fike, and many others.

=== BTS ===
In 2018, Ron Perry was involved in the signing of the K-pop group BTS, who were at the time unknown.

Perry discovered the demo for "Dynamite" and brought it to BTS. In doing so, the song became the first K-pop song to reach number 1 on the Billboard Hot 100. "Dynamite" co-writer Jessica Agombar told Billboard that the song came directly from Perry's direction, recalling that he was "the most unbelievable and communicative A&R" throughout the process, working back and forth over FaceTime and texts to perfect the record.

Perry also co-wrote and co-produced BTS's "Butter," which debuted at number 1 on the Billboard Hot 100 and spent ten weeks at the top of the chart. He told Variety that when collaborator Jenna Andrews first played him the hook, he immediately had a creative vision for it, describing it as "Michael Jackson's 'Smooth Criminal' meets Daft Punk.

=== Lil Nas X and "Old Town Road" ===
Perry signed Lil Nas X to Columbia in March 2019. He recommended the song "Old Town Road" for Lil Nas X. Billy Ray Cyrus was quoted in Time magazine: "I was having coffee and Ron Perry from Columbia Records sent me 'Old Town Road.' He said Lil Nas X wanted me to sing on it. But I told Columbia it was perfect."

"Old Town Road" earned Lil Nas X two Grammy Awards—Best Music Video and Best Pop Duo/Group Performance—out of six nominations at the 62nd Annual Grammy Awards, making him one of that year's most nominated artists. Perry orchestrated the appearance of BTS on Lil Nas X's "Old Town Road" remix and arranged for them to perform alongside Lil Nas X at the 62nd Annual Grammy Awards in 2020. The remix spent a record nineteen consecutive weeks at number 1 on the Billboard Hot 100—the longest run in the chart's history at the time.

Lil Nas X's subsequent releases under Perry, "Montero (Call Me by Your Name)" and "Industry Baby", both reached number 1 on the Billboard Hot 100.

=== Miley Cyrus and "Flowers" ===
Perry promoted Miley Cyrus throughout his tenure at Columbia. Her 2023 single "Flowers" became the best-selling global single of 2023, debuting at number 1 on the Billboard Hot 100 and breaking Spotify's record for most streams in a single week with over 100 million streams. The song debuted at number 1 on the Billboard Hot 100 and led to her first-ever Grammy wins: Record of the Year and Best Pop Solo Performance awarded at the 66th Annual Grammy Awards. Producer Tyler Johnson told Billboard: "Ron Perry was really leading the charge of making sure 'Flowers' and 'Used To Be Young' were right. Those songs were definitely the priority, especially 'Flowers.'"

== Songs Music Publishing (2004–2017) ==
During 2004–2017, Perry served as president and partner of Songs Music Publishing, originally founded by Matt Pincus.

Perry introduced the Weeknd and Daft Punk, a collaboration that produced the Diamond-certified "Starboy" single, and the 7× Platinum "I Feel It Coming" release.

Perry is credited as A&R on Lorde's second album Melodrama, which debuted at number 1 on the Billboard 200 and received a Grammy Award nomination for Album of the Year at the 60th Annual Grammy Awards.

In December 2017, Songs was sold to Kobalt Music Publishing, after which Perry transitioned to his role at Columbia Records.

== Social advocacy ==
According to Variety, on May 28, 2020, two days into the demonstrations in Minneapolis following the murder of George Floyd, Columbia Records and Ron Perry were the first major music company to post in support of the Black Lives Matter movement, stating: "We stand together with the Black community against all forms of racism, bigotry, and violence. Now, more than ever we must use our voices to speak up and challenge the injustices all around us."

== Pop culture appearances ==
Perry as depicted in the Season 18 "#HappyHolograms" episode of South Park in 2014.

A lifelong Nirvana fan, Perry delivered what Variety described as an impromptu, on-point guitar performance of "Smells Like Teen Spirit" alongside Miley Cyrus at Adam Leber's 40th birthday party in the Hollywood Hills in 2017, with Variety noting that Cyrus delivered "a true-to-the-original guttural vocal that's perfectly in tune with Perry's on-point guitar playing, even more impressive considering it was completely impromptu."

In 2019, Perry celebrated his birthday at The Troubadour in Los Angeles, playing 1990s cover songs with John Mayer, Leon Bridges, Andrew Watt, and Ryan Tedder at the 400-capacity club. Among the artists in attendance for the invite-only bash were John Legend, Pharrell Williams, Rosalía, HAIM, and Dominic Fike, among others. Perry and Mayer closed the evening playing "Closing Time" by Semisonic.

== Recognition ==
- In 2020, Perry was named music executive of the year by Variety for his leadership at Columbia Records.
- 2024 UJA-Federation of New York Music Visionary of the Year
- 2022 Billboard Power List: No. 17
- 2021 Variety's Label of the Year
- 2020 Variety's Hitmakers Executive of the Year
- 2020 Billboard's inaugural Breakthrough Award
- 2020 Billboard's Power 100
- 2019 Billboard's Power 100: No. 34
- 2018 Variety’s "New Power of New York" list
- 2018 Billboard's Power 100: No. 28
- 2017 Variety's 2017 Hitmakers
- 2017 Billboard's Power 100
- 2016 Billboard's inaugural A&R Power Players list
- 2014-2016 Billboard's 40 Under 40
- 2013 The Hollywood Reporter's Top 35 Hitmakers in Music list
