= Damnation A.D. =

American band

- Origin: Washington, D.C., United States
- Genres: Metalcore
- Years active: 1992–1998; 2007–present
- Labels: Jade Tree Records; Revelation Records; Victory Records; Epitaph Records

Damnation A.D. is an American band from Washington, D.C. The group released several albums in the 1990s before disbanding. They reformed in 2007.

== History ==
Damnation A.D. formed under the name "Damnation" in 1992 by two veterans of the D.C. straight edge hardcore punk scene, songwriter/guitarist Ken Olden and vocalist Mike McTernan (who is the brother of producer Brian McTernan). After the band Worlds Collide broke up, featuring Ken Olden on guitar and Hillel Halloway on bass, Damnation began as a studio project; on their early single releases, Olden plays drums in addition to guitar. Signing with Jade Tree Records, the group added several new members and changed their name to Damnation A.D. in order to avoid confusion with punk group Damnation. After releasing a split 7-inch single with Walleye, they released their debut full-length in 1995. An EP followed in 1996 as did tours with Ignite and Earth Crisis. In 1998, the group left Jade Tree for Revelation Records and released their second album, Kingdom of Lost Souls, in 1998.

The group split up shortly after, with Olden moving into recording and also working with Ray Cappo in Better Than a Thousand. Mike McTernan moved to Springfield, MA and sang with When Tigers Fight until 2007, when he and Olden decided to begin recording again. The duo, with the help of Give Up the Ghost, Darkest Hour, Earth Crisis, and Fall Out Boy, recorded a third album for Victory Records entitled In This Life or the Next. In 2017, the band released a cover album of Pornography, originally recorded by The Cure.

== Members ==
Current

- Mike McTernan – vocals
- Ken Olden – guitar
- Hillel Halloway – guitar (later of Black Manta)
- Alex Merchlinsky – bass
- Shannon Lucas – drums

Former

- Colin Kercz – drums (of Most Precious Blood)
- Brian "Smitty" Smith – drums
- Dave Ward – drums
- Dave Bryson – drums
- Nick Rotundo – drums
- Daniel Fleming – guitar
- Brian Kerley – guitar
- David Johnson – vocals

== Discography ==
- No More Dreams of Happy Endings (Jade Tree Records, 1995)
- Misericordia EP (Jade Tree, 1996)
- Kingdom of Lost Souls (Revelation Records, 1998)
- In This Life or the Next (Victory Records, 2007)
- Pornography (Organized Crime Records, 2017)

Music videos

- "Knot" (2007)
