= Sinking Ships =

American hardcore punk band

- Origin: Seattle, Washington, U.S.
- Genres: Hardcore punk, melodic hardcore
- Years active: 2004–2008, 2013
- Labels: Revelation, 6131, Run For Cover
- Members: Paul Betinson; Danny Hesketh; Colin Horn; Nate Huddle; Roger Kilburn; Andy Rice

Sinking Ships were an American hardcore punk band from Seattle, Washington, formed in 2004. In 2005, the band released their debut EP, Meridian, on Run for Cover Records and later reissued on 6131 Records and contributed the track "Turn My Headphones Up" to the Generations compilation released on Revelation Records.

Later that year, Sinking Ships signed to Revelation Records and released their album, Disconnecting, in July 2006. During their existence, Sinking Ships toured with bands such as Comeback Kid, Down To Nothing, Shook Ones, Blacklisted, and Shipwreck. They also released an EP on Revelation entitled Ten, as well as the tour-only single "Safe". Sinking Ships also released a split album released in Japan on the Alliance Trax label with the Japanese bands As We Let Go and My Love.

In the spring and summer of 2008, Sinking Ships played the Rainfest festival.

Members have gone on to play in Wait In Vain, Self Defense Family, Gone But Not Forgotten, Meltdown, and A Storm of Light.

In 2013, the band reunited for the Rainfest pre-show.

== Members ==
- Danny Hesketh (vocals, 2004–2008, 2013)
- Paul Betinson (guitar, 2004–2008, 2013)
- Colin Horn (bass, 2004–2008, 2013)
- Roger Kilburn (guitar, 2006–2008, 2013)
- Nate Huddle (drums, 2008)
- Andy Rice (drums, 2006–2007)
- Ryan Seymour (guitar, 2004–2006)

== Discography ==
=== Albums ===
- Disconnecting (Revelation Records, 2006)

=== Singles & EPs ===
- Demo (2004, Farewell Records)
- Meridian (2005, Run for Cover Records/6131 Records)
- Ten (2007, Revelation Records)
- Safe (2007, Sinking Ships Records)
- Split with My Love & As We Let Go (2008, Alliance Trax)
- Out of Touch/Bee Honda (2008, Sinking Ships Records)

=== Compilation appearances ===
- "Turn My Headphones Up" on Generations: A Hardcore Compilation (2005, Revelation Records)
- "Turn My Headphones Up" on In-Flight: No-Slam! (2006, Revelation Records)
- "Not Listed" on Death or Glory Fest 2005 (2006, Downtown Academy Records)
- "The Next Time I Go" on Summer Smash '06 (2006, RevHQ)
- "Shadows" on Louder Than Bombs Vol. 2 (2006, Alliance Trax)
- "The Sound" on Sound and Fury Festival 2006 (2007, Sound and Fury)
- "Irish Wristwatch" on Hardcore, Punk, Etc. 2008 (2008, RevHQ)
