= Matt Pincus =

American music publisher

- Born: Matthew Storrs Pincus
- Education: Columbia University (BA, MBA)
- Occupation: Music Publisher
- Known for: Founder and CEO of Songs Music Publishing
- Spouse: Sarah Min
- Parents: Lionel Pincus (father); Suzanne Storrs (mother)

Matthew Storrs Pincus is an American music publisher and investor who founded Songs Music Publishing. He is also the current bassist of the band New York City Hardcore Band Judge.

== Early life and education ==
Pincus is the son of Lionel Pincus, co-founder and chairman of private equity firm Warburg Pincus. His mother, Suzanne Storrs, was Miss Utah in 1955 and a television actress, who was married to Lionel Pincus until her death in 1995. He is a graduate of Columbia University, where he received his B.A. in 1995 and M.B.A. in 2002. He has a brother, Henry Pincus, who is an actor and also attended Columbia.

== Career ==
At age 17, he joined the New York hardcore band Judge, where he played bass.

In college, Pincus interned at various record labels, including EMI and Jive Records. He was also a campus representative for Atlantic Records and worked as an assistant editor at the New York magazine after college.

Having graduated from Columbia Business School, Pincus worked at EMI as a strategy associate. In 2004, he invested $5 million of his own money into Songs Music Publishing with Ron Perry, a fellow EMI alum. The two initially targeted Christian rock and hard rock musicians before looking into more commercial acts including Ted Leo and the Pharmacists and Conor Oberst. Under Pincus' leadership, the label represented a clientele of 300 artists, including chart-topping musicians such as Lorde, Diplo, and The Weeknd.

In 2015, he testified before the United States Senate to demand a revamp of the country's system for calculating songwriter royalties and warned against the encroachment of Big Tech on the music publishing industry. In a partnership with Barry Weiss, Pincus co-founded a new independent label, RECORDS.

In 2017, Pincus and Perry were named to the Billboard magazine's Power 100 list, which ranks the most influential businesspeople in the music industry. He sold the company in December 2017 for $160 million to Kobalt Music Group.

In 2018, Pincus joined LionTree as executive-in-residence and took up an advisory role at Snap Inc.

He has been a member of the board of directors of the National Music Publishers' Association, the American Society of Composers, Authors and Publishers, Songwriters Hall of Fame, the financial services startup HIFI, and the music creation platform Splice, of which he is also an investor.

== Personal life ==
Pincus is married to Sarah Min, former managing editor of Domino, a shopping publication of Condé Nast.

After his father died, he and his brother sued Princess Firyal, accusing her of taking advantage of their father's deteriorating mental and physical state by spending extravagant sums to decorate a 14-room duplex in the Pierre Hotel.
