= Ferial =

Ferial can be

- An alternative spelling of the Persian girls' name Faryal
- Pertaining to a day in the calendar of ancient Rome when no work was done; see Glossary of ancient Roman religion#feria
- Pertaining to Feria days - days in the calendar of the Catholic Church which are not dedicated to any holy person or event
- An annual festival held at the Teatro Aguascalientes in Mexico
