= Lionel Pincus =

American businessman and philanthropist (1931-2009)

- Historical photo of Lionel Pincus
- Born: Lionel I. Pincus; March 2, 1931; Philadelphia, Pennsylvania, U.S.
- Died: October 10, 2009 (aged 78); New York City, U.S.
- Education: University of Pennsylvania; Columbia Business School (MBA)
- Occupations: Businessman, banker, philanthropist
- Known for: Founder of Warburg Pincus
- Spouse: Suzanne Storrs (m. 1967; died 1995)
- Children: 2 sons, including Matt Pincus

Lionel I. Pincus (March 2, 1931 — October 10, 2009) was an American businessman and philanthropist. He was the founder of the private equity firm Warburg Pincus, running it from 1966 to 2002, and later became the chairman emeritus of the company.

== Early life ==
Pincus was born to a Jewish family in Philadelphia, Pennsylvania, the son of Henry (d. 1949) and Theresa Celia (née Levit, d. 1982) Pincus. His grandparents were Jewish immigrants from Russia and Poland. After being educated at The Hill School, he graduated from the University of Pennsylvania with a bachelor's degree in English in 1953. His family had clothes retailing and real estate businesses; rather than join those businesses, he pursued an MBA at Columbia Business School, graduating in 1956.

== Career ==
Pincus joined Ladenburg Thalmann, an investment banking firm, in 1955, and became a partner in the firm at age 29. He formed Lionel I. Pincus & Co., Inc., a financial consultancy, in 1964. The following year, he joined the board of directors of E.M. Warburg & Co., founded in 1939 by Eric Warburg, and in 1966, the two firms merged. The company was renamed to E.M. Warburg Pincus in 1970, and to Warburg Pincus LLC in 2001.

Pincus is a "pioneer of the venture capital megafund", raising billions of dollars to invest in companies across industries. The money he raised came from, among other sources, blue chip pension funds, such as AT&T, IBM, GE, Pacific Telesis, and GM, state pension funds, and college endowments.

An early venture capital fund, EMW Associates, was organized by Pincus in 1970, with $20 million in capital, about half of which came from officers of the company. This was followed by successively larger funds; a $2 billion fund organized by Warburg Pincus in 1989 was described as "five times larger than any other venture partnership". A later fund, closed in 2000, raised $2.5 billion, and was then described as the "biggest so far in the private-equity industry". The tenth and final fund raised while Pincus headed the company raised over $5.3 billion, closing in 2002.

Early investments included 20th Century Fox, Humana, and Warner, a company later acquired by Waste Management, Inc. In 1984, Warburg Pincus invested in Mattel, and Pincus joined its board of directors. By 2002, when Pincus ended his tenure as the hands-on leader of the company, it had overseen investments of more than $13 billion in over 450 companies in 29 countries.

In 1999, Warburg Pincus sold its asset management division to Credit Suisse for $650 million, which also acquired an interest in the private equity division of Warburg Pincus.

== Philanthropy ==
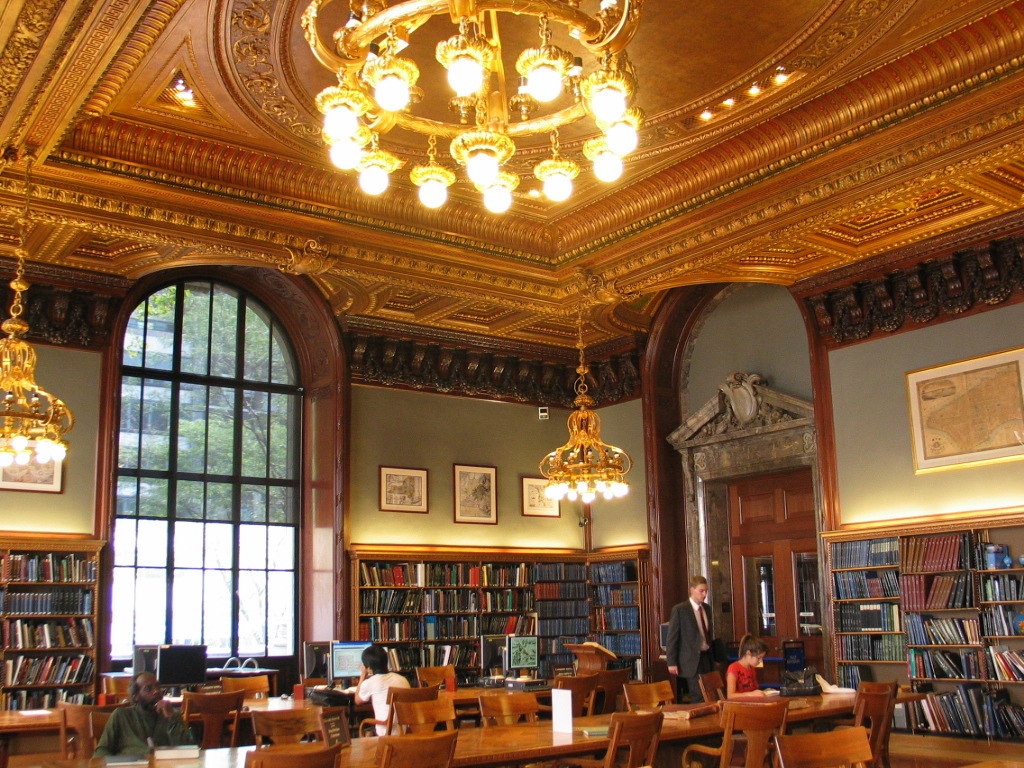
The Map Division

Pincus supported several philanthropic activities, including a $10 million donation to Columbia University, New York in 1995. He was a trustee of the university at the time. In 2005, the New York Public Library renovated its main map room, principally financed and endowed by Pincus and his companion Princess Firyal of Jordan. The renovation cost $5 million and was also financially supported by the City of New York and the U.S. Government. The division was renamed The Lionel Pincus and Princess Firyal Map Division. He was recognized in 2002 for having donated more than $5 million to the Library.

== Personal ==
Pincus married the former Suzanne Storrs, a former Miss Utah winner and actress, in 1967. They had two sons, Henry A. Pincus (married to Ana Terzani) and Matthew S. Pincus (married to Sarah Min). She died in 1995 at the age of 60, after a long battle with ovarian cancer.

His subsequent companion was Princess Firyal of Jordan.

Following cancer surgery in 2006, Pincus was declared mentally and physically unwell, and his sons became his guardians. In 2008, his apartment at The Pierre hotel was offered for sale, over the objections of Princess Firyal. The asking price at the time was a large, undisclosed multi-million dollar amount.
