= Suzanne Storrs =

American actress (1934-1995)

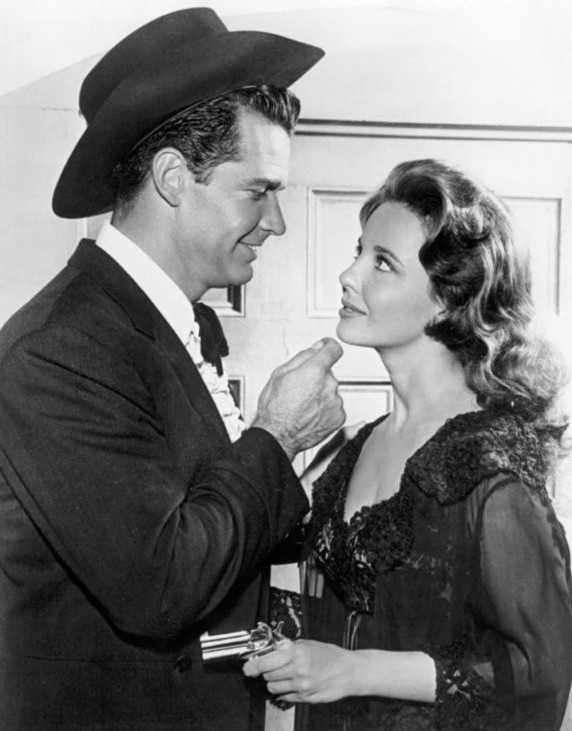
- James Garner and Suzanne Storrs in Maverick (1960)
- Born: Suzanne Storrs Poulton; April 13, 1934; Provo, Utah, U.S.
- Died: January 25, 1995 (aged 60); New York City, U.S.
- Years active: c.1955–1966
- Spouse: Lionel Pincus (m. 1967)
- Children: 2 sons, including Matt Pincus

Suzanne Storrs (April 13, 1934 – January 25, 1995), born Suzanne Storrs Poulton and later known by her married name Suzanne Pincus, was a former Miss Utah and an American television actress, who appeared in 16 television series between 1954 and 1961, usually as the beautiful leading lady.

== Life and career ==
Storrs was in many shows during her 1950s and 1960s television career, including Maverick with James Garner (in an episode entitled "Guatemala City"), Wanted Dead or Alive with Steve McQueen (in "To the Victor"), Sugarfoot (in "Trouble at Sand Springs"), two episodes of The Untouchables, 77 Sunset Strip, Hawaiian Eye, The Phil Silvers Show, Armstrong Circle Theatre, Lawman, U.S. Steel Hour, and The DuPont Show of the Month (in "The Scarlet Pimpernel"), and played recurring character Janet Halloran in nine episodes of the original 1958-59 version of Naked City with John McIntire.

== Personal life ==
The young actress won the Miss Utah title in 1955. In 1967, she married financier Lionel Pincus, a co-founder of the multibillion-dollar private-equity firm Warburg Pincus. They donated $10 million to Columbia University in 1995. Pincus and she had two sons, Henry and Matthew. She became a director of various charitable organizations and died after a lengthy illness at age 60 in 1995. Her husband died at age 78 in 2009.

== Selected television ==
Year	Title	Role	Notes
1958	The Donna Reed Show	Mrs. Cooper	Episode "The Football Uniform"
1959	Hawaiian Eye	Nancy Campbell	Episode "The Koa Man"
1960	Wanted Dead or Alive	Liz Strata	Season 3, episode 8 "To the Victor"
