= Sammy Siegler =

American drummer (born 1973)

- Born: March 21, 1973 (age 53)
- Origin: United States
- Genres: Hardcore punk; youth crew; post-hardcore; indie rock; nu metal
- Occupation: Musician
- Instrument: Drums
- Years active: 1987–present

Sammy Siegler (born March 21, 1973) is an American rock drummer, notable for his many contributions to the New York hardcore scene. Siegler also filled in on drums for artists like Limp Bizkit and Patti Smith.

== Discography ==
=== With Project X ===
- Straight Edge Revenge (1987)

=== With Side by Side ===
- New York City Hardcore - Together compilation (1987, Revelation Records)
- You're Only Young Once... (1988, Revelation Records)
  - reissued in 1997
- New York City Hardcore - The Way It Is compilation (1988, Revelation Records)

=== With Youth of Today ===
- We're Not in This Alone (1988)
- Youth of Today (1990)

=== With Judge ===
- Chung King Can Suck It (1989, Revelation Records)
- Bringin' It Down (1989, Revelation Records)
- There Will Be Quiet... (1990)
- What It Meant: The Complete Discography (2005, Revelation Records)

=== With CIV ===
- CIV (1995)
- All Twisted (1995)
- Set Your Goals (1995, Revelation Records)
- Anti-Matter (1996)
- Thirteen Day Getaway (1998, Atlantic Records)

=== With Glassjaw ===
- Everything You Ever Wanted to Know About Silence (2000, Roadrunner Records)

=== With Rival Schools ===
- Onelinedrawing split with Onelinedrawing (2001)
- United by Fate (2001, Island Records)
- Pedals (album) (2011, Atlantic/Photo Finish Records)
- Found (2013, Shop Radio Cast)

=== With Nightmare of You ===
- Nightmare of You (2005, East West Records)
- Bang (2007, The Bevonshire Label)

=== With Limp Bizkit ===
- The Unquestionable Truth (Part 1) (2005, Geffen Records)

=== With Tech N9ne ===
- Therapy (2013)

=== With Head Automatica ===
- Swan Damage (TBA)

=== With Constant Elevation ===
- Constant Elevation (2019, Revelation Records)

== Producing ==
He produced the self-titled 2008 EP by the King Left.
