= Bold (band) =

American hardcore punk band

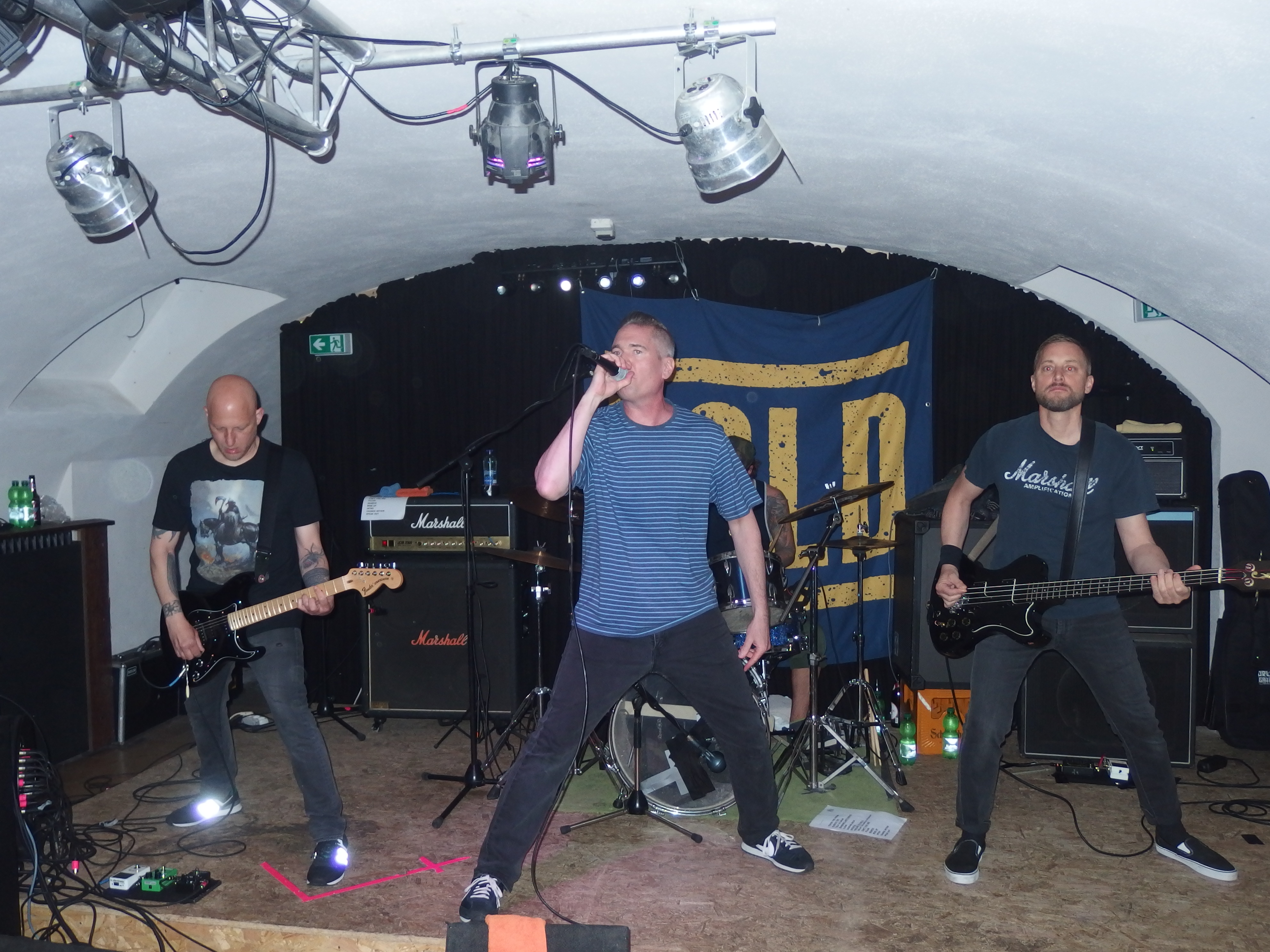

Background information
- Also known as: Crippled Youth
- Origin: Katonah, New York
- Genres: Hardcore punk
- Years active: 1985–1993, 2005–present
- Labels: New Beginning, Revelation Records
- Past members: Matt Warnke; Tim Brooks; Drew Thomas; John Zuluaga; Tom Capone; Vinny Panza; John Porcelly

Bold (originally named Crippled Youth) is an American late 1980s youth crew hardcore band from Westchester County, New York, which, along with bands like Youth of Today and Side by Side, were a part of the Youth Crew and an influence in the late 80s straight edge hardcore scene. The band progressed to a more rock-oriented sound in its later years.

== History ==
=== 1985–1993: Original run ===
Originally called Crippled Youth, the band was formed in Katonah, New York, by Matt Warnke (vocals), Tim Brooks (bass) and Drew Thomas (drums). After a couple of shows with Matt singing and playing guitar, they recruited John 'Zulu' Zuluaga on guitar, and Matt switched to just singing. They released a 7-inch EP entitled 'Join The Fight' on the California label New Beginning in 1986 before switching to the name Bold. It was under this name that they recorded the 11-song LP Speak Out. The record was supposed to be released on California's WishingWell Records, but was eventually released in 1988 on Revelation Records.

The band later recruited Tom Capone (Beyond/Shelter/Quicksand/etc.) on second guitar, and recorded a self-titled 3-song 7-inch in 1989, also on Revelation Records. The 7-inch is considered by many their best material, adding more melody to their straightforward hardcore sound. The 7-inch EP was re-issued on a 12-inch entitled 'Looking Back' in 1993, with 2 bonus tracks.

=== 1996: Faux reunion ===
In 1996, Warnke formed a post-hardcore band with bassist Eddie McNamara, drummer Mark Shutdown and guitarist Chris Daley inspired by the Clash and Fugazi. Despite the band members believing it to be an entirely separate group from Bold, their debut headline show saw them billed as Bold and cover multiple Bold songs. According to McNamara in an article for NoEcho, this led to significant confusion and the members of the band clarifying during their performance they were not, in fact, Bold.

=== 2005–present: Reunion ===
Bold re-united in 2005 with Warnke on vocals, Capone on guitar, Brooks on bass and Vinny Panza on drums. John Porcelly, who periodically played with the band in the 1980s, later joined on second guitar. To coincide with the re-union, Revelation released the retrospective CD The Search: 1985–1989, which contains the band's entire recorded output.

Warnke and Porcelly left in 2006, effectively breaking up the band. The band's recordings from the period after they got back together, although allegedly completed, have yet to surface. A European tour with replacement members was planned for Summer 2007, but did not happen.

In June 2012, Bold played the EPIC Revelation Records 25 Year Anniversary shows at The Glasshouse in Pomona, California. Also on the bill were Youth of Today, Gorilla Biscuits, Sick of It All, Shai Hulud, No for an Answer, Statue and Underdog. During October of that same year, Bold took part in Revelation's 25th Anniversary East Coast shows at Irving Plaza.

In June 2025, Bold, with Porcelly on guitar, played a series of shows on the West Coast and is slated for an East Coast run in late July with Youth Of Today.

== Band-member notes ==
- Matt Warnke sang for a band called One-Sided War with Patrick from Citizens Arrest in the late 90s before forming Running Like Thieves (named after a Bold song) with John Biviano and Andy Guida of Supertouch, which put out two EPs on New Jersey's LiveWire Records. Tim Brooks and Rhys Williams performed on the "Same Time Next Year" release. Matt has since quit the band and is currently fronting the re-united Bold.
- Drew Thomas formed Into Another with ex-Underdog singer Richie Birkenhead in 1990. They put out several records throughout the 90s, but have now broken up. Thomas also played drums for The New Rising Sons (fronted by ex-Texas Is the Reason member Garret Klahn). They released two EPs on the Grape OS label before signing to Virgin Records, but broke up before an album could be completed.
- Tom Capone played in several bands throughout the 1990s, such as Quicksand, Handsome and Instruction. He is currently playing with a reunited Quicksand.
- John "Zulu" Zuluaga is currently playing for The Hoof .
- Tim Brooks played with Youth of Today during their 1999 reunion, Running Like Thieves, a.r.e. weapons, and Shelter in 2011
- In 2023, Tim Brooks joined the band Values Here with John Porcelly (Porcell) on guitar and Vinny Panza on drums

== Discography ==
- Speak Out LP (Revelation Records 1988)
- S/T 7-inch (Revelation Records 1989)
- Looking Back (Revelation Records 1993)
- The Search: 1985–1989 (Complete Discography) (Revelation Records 2005)
