= Start Today =

Studio album by Gorilla Biscuits
- Released: 1989
- Recorded: January–April, 1989
- Studios: Demo² Studios, New York City
- Genre: Hardcore punk
- Length: 24:09
- Label: Revelation
- Producers: Gorilla Biscuits & Don Fury

Gorilla Biscuits chronology
Gorilla Biscuits (1988)	Start Today (1989)

Professional ratings
Review scores
Source	Rating
AllMusic	4.5/5 stars
The Encyclopedia of Popular Music	4/5 stars
Tiny Mix Tapes	4.5/5 marks

Start Today is the debut studio album by American hardcore punk band Gorilla Biscuits, released in 1989. It is considered an influential record in hardcore punk, with NME naming it among the genre's 15 best albums of all time. It is the best selling record ever released by Revelation Records, with copies in excess of 100,000 sold on CD alone.

== Track listing ==
All songs written by Walter Schreifels, except where noted.

No.	Title	Length
1.	"New Direction"	2:29
2.	"Stand Still"	2:08
3.	"Degradation"	1:35
4.	"Good Intentions"	0:29
5.	"Forgotten"	1:32
6.	"Things We Say"	1:42
7.	"Start Today"	2:04
8.	"Two Sides"	1:40
9.	"First Failure"	1:07
10.	"Competition"	2:04
11.	"Time Flies"	1:45
12.	"Cats And Dogs"	1:36
13.	"Sitting Around at Home" (Buzzcocks cover)	1:43
14.	"Biscuit Power"	1:24
Total length:		24:09

- Tracks 13 and 14 are also available on the Gorilla Biscuits EP and are unlisted.

== Personnel ==
=== Gorilla Biscuits ===
- Anthony "Civ" Civarelli – vocals
- Walter Schreifels – guitar
- Alex Brown – guitar
- Arthur Smilios – bass
- Luke Abbey – drums

=== Additional musicians ===
- Toby Morse – backing vocals
