= Gorilla Biscuits (album) =

EP by Gorilla Biscuits
- Released: 1988
- Recorded: January 1988
- Studio: Demo Demo Studios, New York City
- Genre: Hardcore punk
- Length: Original 11:33; CD 19:28
- Label: Revelation
- Producer: Walter Schreifels; Don Fury

Gorilla Biscuits chronology
Gorilla Biscuits (1988)	Start Today (1989)

Professional ratings
Review scores
Source	Rating
AllMusic	2.5/5 stars

Gorilla Biscuits is the debut EP by American hardcore punk band Gorilla Biscuits, released in 1988. Originally released as a seven-song 7-inch on Revelation Records, it was later reissued in an expanded edition on CD in 1991.

== Critical reception ==
AllMusic gave the album a mixed review, writing that "the first release from hardcore legends Gorilla Biscuits is a vital part of the band's history but still far from the classic Start Today LP issued only a year later."

== Track listing ==
=== Original release (7") ===
All tracks are written by Walter Schreifels.

Side A
No.	Title	Length
1.	"High Hopes"	2:25
2.	"Big Mouth"	2:00
3.	"No Reason Why"	1:53
4.	"GM2"	0:21

Side B
No.	Title	Length
5.	"Hold Your Ground"	2:02
6.	"Breaking Free"	1:13
7.	"Finish What You Started"	1:41
Total length:		11:35

=== CD reissue ===
No.	Title	Length
1.	"High Hopes"	2:25
2.	"Big Mouth"	2:00
3.	"No Reason Why"	1:53
4.	"GM2"	0:21
5.	"Hold Your Ground"	2:02
6.	"Breaking Free"	1:13
7.	"Finish What You Started"	1:41
8.	"Sitting Round at Home" (Buzzcocks cover)	1:43
9.	"Biscuit Power" (or "Gorilla Biscuits")	1:24
10.	"Short End of the Stick"	1:32
11.	"Hold Your Ground" (Demo)	2:04
12.	"Slut" (Demo)	1:13
Total length:		19:31

- Tracks 8 to 12 are unlisted.

== Personnel ==
=== Gorilla Biscuits ===
- Anthony "Civ" Civarelli – vocals
- Walter Schreifels – guitar
- Arthur Smilios – bass guitar
- Luke Abbey – drums
