= Princess Firyal =

Jordanian princess and philanthropist

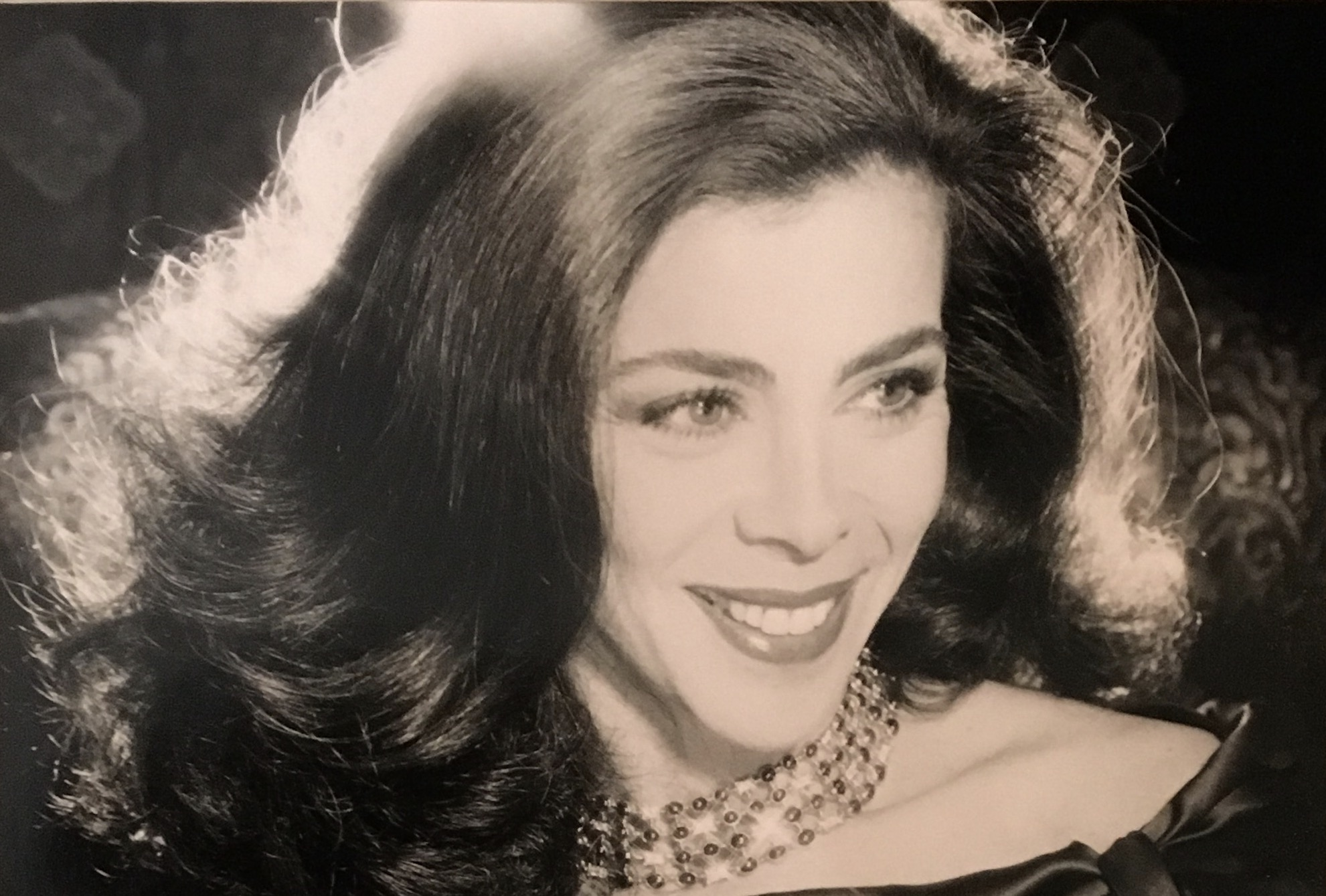
- Born: Firyal Irshaid; 1945 (age 80–81); Jerusalem, Mandatory Palestine
- Spouse: Prince Muhammad bin Talal (m. 1964; div. 1978)
- Issue: Prince Talal; Prince Ghazi
- Father: Farid Mahmoud Irshaid
- Mother: Farida Irshaid

Princess Firyal (née Firyal Irshaid Arabic: فريال إرشيد; born 1945) is a Jordanian humanitarian and philanthropist.

She became a UNESCO Goodwill Ambassador in 1992, working on programs for education and protection of world heritage. She is a board member at the International Rescue Committee (IRC), New York Public Library, and a wide range of museums and universities, including the John F. Kennedy School of Government at Harvard University.

Irshaid is a graduate of Columbia University. From 1964 to 1978, she was married to Prince Muhammad bin Talal—younger brother of King Hussein of Jordan—by whom she has two sons, Prince Talal and Prince Ghazi.

== Biography ==
=== Early life and education ===
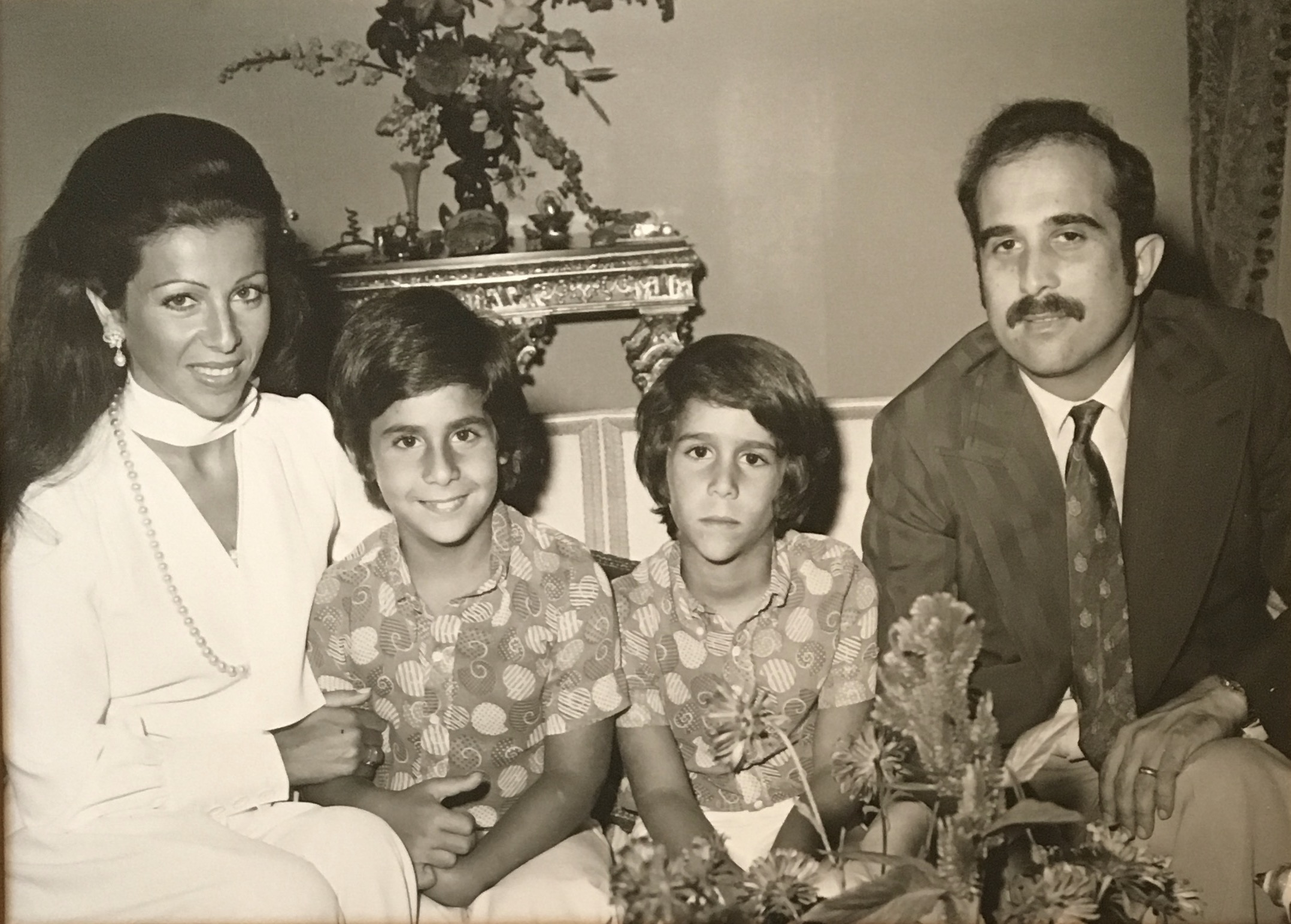
Firyal with Prince Muhammad bin Talal and their sons Prince Talal and Prince Ghazi

Born in Jerusalem, Firyal Irshaid is the daughter of the late Sayyid Farid Mahmoud Irshaid, a political leader who served as a minister in the government and a parliamentarian in the Jordan Senate. Her mother Farida was chairwoman of the Red Crescent Society in the West Bank.

Irshaid attended Berzeit College. She studied for two years at the American College for Women in Beirut before her marriage; she resumed her studies and earned a bachelor's degree from Columbia University School of General Studies in 1999.

=== Career ===
Irshaid was appointed a UNESCO Goodwill Ambassador in 1992. Three years later, in 1995, she was appointed Special Advisor to the Director General of UNESCO. She works primarily on programs for protection of world heritage and education.

In Jordan, Irshaid became active in relief work in refugee camps. She worked for the literacy programs with the nomadic Bedouin tribes. She also established the family planning program.

Irshaid launched the International Hope Foundation under the UNESCO umbrella in 1994 for the benefit of homeless and street children.

Irshaid's philanthropic positions and credentials include:

- Board of Directors of the United Nations Association in March, 2003.
- Board of Trustees of the International Rescue Committee based in New York.
- International Council at Columbia University
- Board of Trustees of the New York Public Library
- Trustee of the Musée des Arts Décoratifs, Paris
- International Council of the Tate Modern in London
- Minister Plenipotentiary by the government of Jordan in May 2007 at the Jordanian Embassy as U.S. Ambassador
- Museum of Modern Art Board of Chairman Council of MOMA.
- Guggenheim Museum Member of the Middle Eastern Circle

== Personal life ==
Irshaid was married to Prince Muhammad bin Talal, with whom she had sons Prince Talal bin Muhammad and Prince Ghazi bin Muhammad, between 1964 and 1978. After their marriage ended in divorce, she dated Greek shipping magnate Stavros Niarchos and later became the longtime companion of American banker Lionel Pincus. After Pincus's death there were allegations by his sons, Henry and Matt Pincus, claiming Firyal had taken advantage of Pincus's deteriorating mental and physical state by spending extravagant sums.

== Honours ==
- Jordan :
  - Grand Cordon of the Order of Independence
  - Grand Cordon of the Order of the State Centennial (24 January 2022)
- Malaysia : Honorary Grand Commander of the Order of the Defender of the Realm (24 April 1965)
