= Faryal =

Faryal (Persian: فریال Faryâl; Arabic: فَرْيَال Faryāl; Azerbaijani: Fəryal; Tajik: Фарёл, romanized: Faryol; Ottoman Turkish: فَرْیال; Turkish: Feryal; Urdu: فریال Faryāl; Uzbek: Faryol; also anglicized as Farial, Ferial, Firyal or Fariyal) is a feminine given name of Persian origin used throughout the Muslim world.

It is a compound of the Persian words فر (far) meaning 'splendour' and یال (yâl) meaning 'neck'. The overall meaning of this name is thus 'the one with a beautiful neck, good neck'.

Women with this given name include:

- Ferial Qadin (died 1902), consort to Khedive Ismail Pasha
- Farial Fuad (1938–2009), princess of Egypt
- Faryal Manmohan (born 1945), actress of Indian and Syrian descent
- Faryal Gohar (born 1959), Pakistani actress
- Faryal Talpur (born 1958), Pakistani politician
- Faryal Mehmood, Pakistani-American actress
- Faryal Makhdoom, wife of Amir Khan
- Fariyal Abdullahi, born (1986), American chef
- Ferial Govashiri, Iranian-American political aide
- Ferial Karim (1938–1988), Lebanese actress
- Ferial Ashraff (born 1953), Sri Lankan politician
- Ferial Haffajee (born 1967), South African journalist
- Ferial Salhi (born 1967), Algerian fencer
- Ferial Alibali (1933–2011), Albanian stage actress
- Ferial Ghazoul, Iraqi scholar
- Feryal Abdelaziz (born 1999), Egyptian karateka
- Feryal Clark (born 1979), British politician
- Feryal Özel (born 1975), Turkish-American astrophysicist
- Firyal Irshaid (born 1945), princess of Jordan
