= Mouthpiece (band) =

American hardcore punk band

- Origin: Trenton, New Jersey, U.S.
- Genres: Hardcore punk
- Years active: 1991–1996, 2000, 2019, 2026
- Label: Revelation Records

Mouthpiece was an American straight edge hardcore punk band, active from 1991 to 1996. Often seen as one of the seminal acts of the 'youth crew' era or the earliest revival of it. In 2000, the band reunited to play a show at CBGB, and in 2019, they reformed to play with Lifetime at The Stone Pony.

In January 2009, Revelation Records released Can't Kill What's Inside which compiled all the band's recorded output.

Following their breakup, vocalist Tim McMahon went on to Hands Tied and then Triple Threat. Original guitarist Pete Reilly went on to form The Eulogy with members of Agnostic Front, Madball, Slapshot, Ignite, Eye For An Eye, Straightfaced, Bleeding Through, and Throwdown.

== Discography ==
Albums

- 1991 Mouthpiece
- 1993 What Was Said
- 1995 Face Tomorrow

Compilation albums

- 2009 Can't Kill What's Inside

Compilation appearances:

- 1996 To the Side – Anti-Matter
