= Shook Ones (band) =

American band

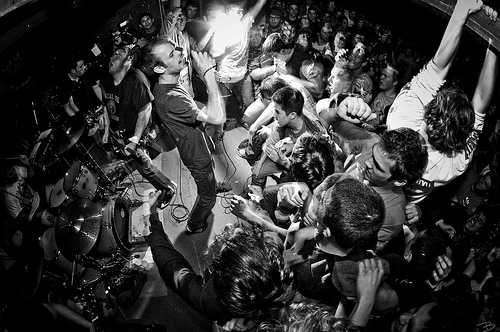

Background information
- Origin: Bellingham, Washington
- Genres: Punk rock Melodic Hardcore
- Years active: 2004 - present
- Labels: Endwell Records, Revelation Records, Runner Up Records, Modern Alchemy, Paper + Plastick

Shook Ones are a band from Bellingham, Washington, that has since relocated to Seattle, Washington. The band has done several tours of the United States and a three-week tour of Europe. In April 2007, the band toured Japan. In November of the same year, Shook Ones left Revelation Records, along with many of the other bands that Revelation had worked with between 2005 and 2007.

In summer 2008, Shook Ones released a split EP with End of a Year, a band which had also left Revelation Records the previous fall. Philadelphia-based Runner Up Records handled the release of the split, which has four songs from Shook Ones and one from End of a Year. The band released an LP in 2009, The Unquoteable A.M.H., on Paper + Plastick.

== Discography ==
=== Studio albums ===
- Sixteen (Endwell Records, 2005)
- Facetious Folly Feat (Revelation Records, 2006)
- The Unquotable A.M.H. (Paper + Plastick, 2009)
- Body Feel (Revelation Records, 2018)

=== EPs ===
- Slaughter of the Insole (Revelation Records, 2006)
- MerriweatherPostPavillion (Run For Cover Records, 2012)

=== Splits ===
- Split with Easel (Alliance Trax/Modern Alchemy, 2007)
- Split with End of A Year (Runner Up Records, 2008)
- Split with Death Is Not Glamorous (Run For Cover Records/Struggletown Records, 2013)

=== Music videos ===
- "Order Form" (2008)
- "Silverfish" (2009)
