= Jimmy Yu =

American musician and monk

Guo Gu
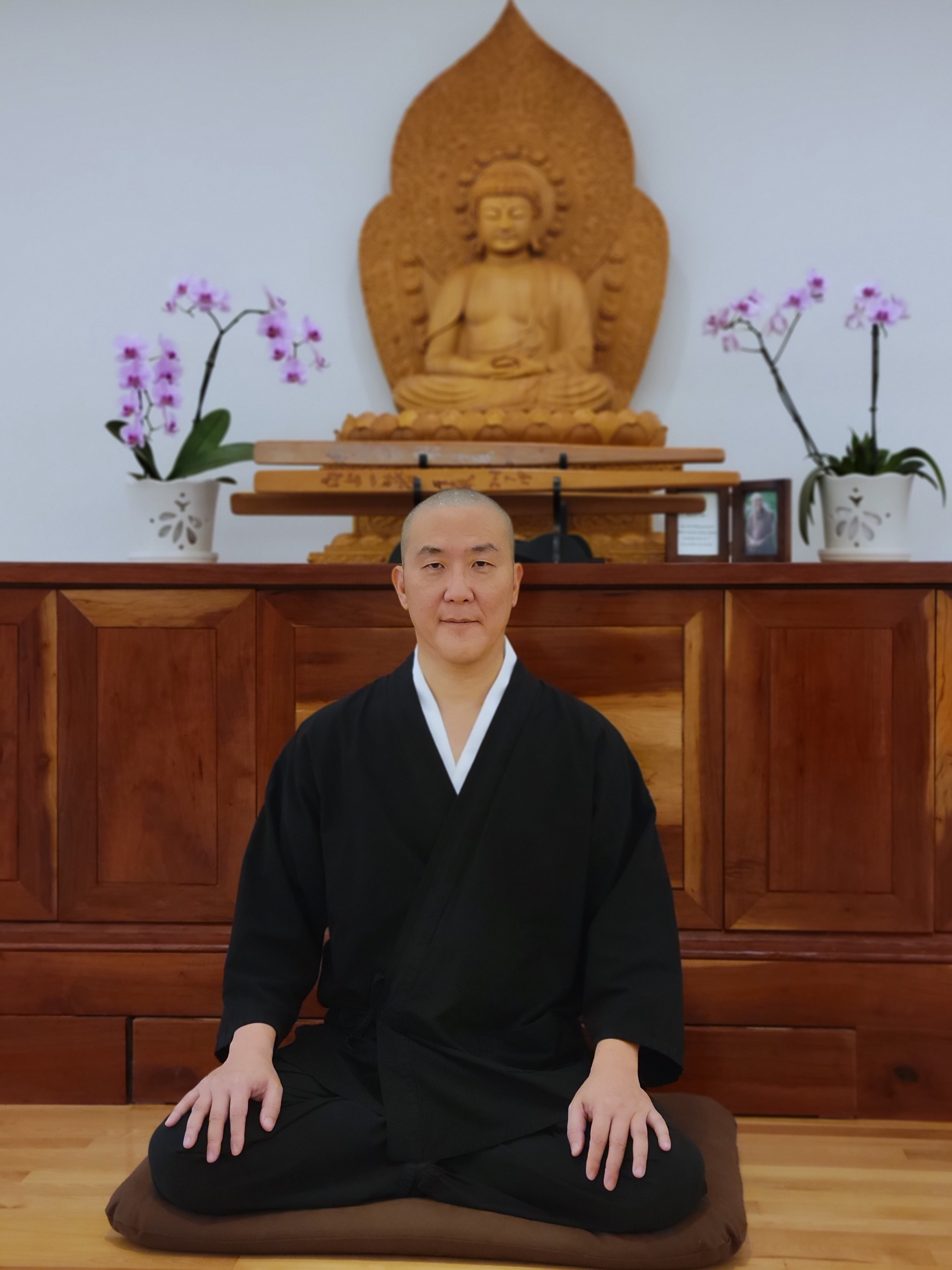
- Jimmy Yu (Guo Gu) at the Tallahassee Chan Center

Personal life
- Born: Jimmy Yu; 1968 (age 57–58)

Religious life
- Religion: Chan Buddhism
- School: Linji school
- Dharma name: Guo Gu

Senior posting
- Teacher: Sheng-yen
- Based in: Tallahassee Chan Center

Jimmy Yu (born 1968), also known as Guo Gu (果谷 Guǒ Gǔ), is a Chan teacher and a scholar of Buddhism. He was the bassist for the American 1980s hardcore bands Death Before Dishonor (the original) and Judge. After his youthful days in straight edge hardcore, he returned to Buddhism and became a monk under Chan Master Sheng Yen. In 2000, he left monasticism to pursue academia. He received an MA degree in Chinese Buddhist studies from the University of Kansas in 2002 and a Ph.D. from Princeton University's Department of Religion in 2008.

He is currently a Professor of Religion at Florida State University, teaching courses in East Asian religious traditions, especially Chinese Buddhism and late imperial Chinese cultural and religious history. His research interests include the history of the body, Buddhist monasticism, Chan/Zen Buddhism, and popular religions within the broader context of fifteenth- to seventeenth-centuries China.

Jimmy Yu is also a long-time practitioner of Chan; his Dharma name is 果谷 Guǒ Gǔ. He practiced with the late Chan Master Sheng Yen from 1982 until the latter died in 2009. Guo Gu was Sheng Yen's translator, attendant, and assistant in leading intense Chan retreats. He first received inka, a seal of approval for his experience of Chan, in 1995 by Sheng Yen, and subsequently received several Inkas from him, the last one being in 2007.

He is the founder and Dharma teacher of the Tallahassee Chan Center in Tallahassee, Florida, and founder of the Dharma Relief project. Additionally, Jimmy Yu is also the author of academic books, such as Sanctity and Self-Inflicted Violence in Chinese Religions (2012) and Reimagining Chan Buddhism: Sheng Yen and the Creation of the Dharma Drum Lineage of Chan (2022). This former explores the religious aspects of self-inflicted violence, such as texts written in blood and the occasional practice of cannibalism during times of famine in late Ming and early Qing China, and the latter is the first socio-intellectual history of the Dharma Drum Lineage of Chan (Zen) by Master Sheng Yen, challenging the received academic and popular image of Chan Buddhism as a meditation school that bypasses scriptural learning.

== Books ==
- Yu, Jimmy, Sanctity and Self-Inflicted Violence in Chinese Religions, 1500–1700, Oxford University Press, 2012. ISBN 978-0-19-984490-6
- Guo Gu, Passing Through the Gateless Barrier: Kōan Practice for Real Life, Shambhala Publications, 2016. ISBN 978-1-61180-281-8
- Guo Gu, The Essence of Chan: A Guide to Life and Practice according to the Teachings of Bodhidharma, Shambhala Publications, 2020 ISBN 978-1-61180-871-1 (first paperback edition); ISBN 978-0-8348-2843-8 (eBook edition, 2012)
- Guo Gu, Silent Illumination: A Chan Buddhist Path to Natural Awakening, Shambhala Publications, 2021 ISBN 978-1-61180-872-8
- Yu, Jimmy, Reimagining Chan Buddhism: Sheng Yen and the Creation of the Dharma Drum Lineage of Chan, Routledge, 2022. ISBN 9781032048444
- Yu, Jimmy, (editor) Readings of the Gateless Barrier, Columbia University Press, 2025. ISBN 9780231207362

== Sources ==
1. Ryan J. Downey "Biography: Judge." AMG Retrieved 19 May 2010
2. Tim McMahon and Gordo of Double Cross "Parts I ~ VI." Retrieved 2 January 2011
3. Department of Religion, FSU faculty page "Jimmy Yu." Retrieved 4 February 2025
