= Songs Music Publishing =

Songs Music Publishing, also known as SONGS, is a music publishing company founded by Matt Pincus and joined by partners Ron Perry in 2004 and Carianne Marshall in 2006. The company has offices in New York City, Los Angeles and London.

SONGS represents songwriters and producers across all genres of music. SONGS' growth has been achieved through the signing of worldwide, exclusive co-publishing agreements with individual writers and through catalog acquisitions.

As of November 2013, founder Matt Pincus continues to serve as CEO of SONGS, Ron Perry serves as the company's President, and Carianne Marshall serves as the Head of Creative Licensing.

In June 2017, SONGS Music Publishing signed worldwide co-publishing deals with four songwriters in contemporary music: Xxxtentacion, Linus Eklow, S1, and Andrew Wyatt.

In September 2017, Songs Music Publishing was put up for sale for over $160 million. In December 2017, SONGS was acquired by Kobalt Music Group.

== Clients ==
Among SONGS' current and past songwriter and producer clients are:

- 1985
- A Life Once Lost
- The Acorn
- Action Action
- Action Item
- Adam Green & Binki Shapiro
- Adam Pallin
- Admiral Radley
- The Album Leaf
- Andrew Heringer
- Arama Mara
- Asobi Seksu
- Attack Attack!
- BEGINNERS
- Bijou
- Blackalicious
- The Bled
- The Boom Circuits
- Brazil
- Brian Lee
- Bright Eyes
- Buried Beds
- Castaneda
- Caveman
- Chancellor Warhol
- Charlie Calleja
- Chiodos
- Clementine & The Galaxy
- The Comas
- Crywolf
- Daniel Heath
- Daphne Loves Derby
- David Immerman
- Deemoney
- Desiigner
- Dev
- The Devil Wears Prada
- Diplo
- The Dirty Heads
- DJ Mustard
- Drake Bell
- Earl Greyhound
- Earlimart
- Electric Owls
- El-P
- Empires
- Eric Bass
- Evan Brau
- Evans Blue
- Every Time I Die
- The Far Country
- Ferraby Lionheart
- Franc Wyte
- French Kicks
- Further Seems Forever
- Gatsby's American Dream
- Ghost Beach
- Glass Theory
- Grant Michaels
- THE GRTNS
- Great Northern
- Greg Garbowsky
- The Holdup
- Holy Fever
- Hopesfall
- Horse The Band
- Hudson Taylor
- The Hunts
- Islands
- It Dies Today
- Jack's Mannequin
- Joshua "J.D." Walker
- Jenna Andrews
- Jess Jackson
- Jet Stream
- Johnny Chrome
- Jolie Holland
- Jose Gonzalez
- JT Harding
- Junip
- Lacuna Coil
- Lay Low
- Lexicon
- Little Joy
- Lorde
- Lovett
- Malbec
- Margot & the Nuclear So and So's
- Marsha Ambrosius
- Matthew Puckett
- Matthew Thiessen
- Max and the Moon
- MaxxFemm
- Mest
- Middle Distance Runner
- Minus The Bear
- Minutes Til Midnight
- MNDR
- Model Photographer
- Molly Marlette
- Monsters Of Folk
- Morgan Kibby
- The Mowgli's
- Murder By Death
- Mustachio
- My American Heart
- Nelly
- Noah Cyrus
- Ocean Grove
- Old 97's
- The Orbans
- Oslo
- Pablo Sebastian
- Pacific Horizons
- Paul Layton
- Peter Black
- Pharrell Williams
- The Pharmacy
- Pigeon John
- The Promise Ring
- Q-Tip
- Ra
- Radio Freq
- Relient K
- Rhett Miller
- Sally Seltmann
- Scary Kids Scaring Kids
- Search/Rescue
- Shahnaz
- Shapes of Race Cars
- Shinedown
- Sidh Solanki
- Sketchbook
- Sleigh Bells
- Slightly Stoopid
- Society
- The Sound of Animals Fighting
- Sydney Wayser
- Tall Dark & Lonesome
- Tantric
- Ted Leo and The Pharmacists
- The Teeth
- Tokyo Police Club
- Triangle
- TVTV
- Two Gallants (band)
- Undergreen
- Valentina Mitzkat
- Waking Ashland
- Walk the Moon
- The Weeknd
- Wolftron
- X Ambassadors
- XXXTentacion
