= Kobalt Music Group =

Music publishing company

Kobalt Music Group Limited
- Type: Subsidiary
- Industry: Music industry
- Founded: 2000; 26 years ago, in New York City, New York, U.S.
- Founder: Willard Ahdritz
- Headquarters: New York City, United States
- Area served: Worldwide
- Key people: Laurent Hubert (CEO); Jeannette Perez (COO and president)
- Services: Publishing; Label services
- Owner: Primary Wave
- Subsidiaries: Kobalt Label Services (KLS); Kobalt Music Publishing (KMP); Atom Ninja Records
- Website: kobaltmusic.com

Kobalt Music Group is an rights management and music publishing company. Founded in 2000 by CEO Willard Ahdritz, Kobalt acts primarily as an administrative publishing company, not owning any copyrights. Also offering label services, the company has developed an online portal to provide royalty income and activity to artists and allow them to manage their rights and royalties directly.

In 2015 it was reported that Kobalt was "the top independent music publisher in the UK and the second overall (to Sony/ATV) in the US," with around 600,000 songs and 8,000 artists in its catalogue Examples of artists served by Kobalt include Paul McCartney, Foo Fighters, John Denver, The Weeknd and Marshmello.

Kobalt owned 17.3% of the top 100 radio songs in the US in of 2015, ranking it third after Universal. Kobalt paid $29.8 million for the acquisition of Fintage House's Music Companies.

In March 2026 US-based music publishing company Primary Wave Music announced that it had entered into a definitive agreement to acquire Kobalt in a transaction worth $7 billion.

== History ==
=== Founding and early years (2000–2011) ===
Kobalt Music Group was founded in 2000 in New York City by Willard Ahdritz, Johan Ekelund , Torbjörn Sten, with founder Willard Ahdritz, a native of Sweden, taking on the role of CEO. Together with Klas Lunding, Ahdritz had previously launched Telegram Publishing in Stockholm in 1988. Kobalt's initial business model focused on collecting and distributing royalties for artists, with the stated goal of ensuring artists were paid appropriately and promptly. In 2005 the company debuted its Kobalt Label Services Portal, an online portal for artists to track and manage their own portfolios.

Kobalt Music Group won Independent Music Publisher of the Year at the 2009 Music Week Awards, winning the following year as well. Kobalt added a neighboring rights division in 2011. In December 2011, Kobalt bought Artists Without a Label (AWAL), a digital distribution and label services company. Kobalt as a result gained access to AWAL's network of digital retail partners, which among other companies included iTunes, Amazon, Spotify, eMusic, Rhapsody, 7Digital, Beatport, Deezer, and Nokia. The acquisition also allowed Kobalt to begin supplying advanced data analytics to clients. (No reference)

=== Expansion and new services (2012–2014) ===
After the AWAL acquisition, Kobalt formed the label services division Kobalt Label Services in 2012. In July 2012, Kobalt Music Group signed a deal with MPL Communications to exclusively provide administrative services to MPL in "the world outside North America, the U.K. and Ireland." The catalog included 1,200 songwriters such as Hugh Masekela and Paul McCartney, with classic songs such as "Baby It's Cold Outside" and "Luck Be A Lady". Prince signed a deal in May 2013 to market and distribute his work with Kobalt, with his rights over his masters left intact.

=== Recent developments (since 2014) ===
Kobalt logo from 2014 to 2023

In 2014 Kobalt purchased the American Mechanical Rights Agency (AMRA), a collection agency. Kobalt announced that it was preparing to expand into the Latin American market in April 2014, and that June the company raised US$140 million in funding to "accelerate rapid growth" and that year Kobalt also raised US$66 million from investors such as MSD Capital.

In February 2015, Google Ventures in New York made Kobalt its inaugural investment, with Google Ventures' president explaining that Kobalt was "changing the way artists are treated in the music business, particularly when it comes to providing trust and transparency and compensating creators for their work." Google Ventures (with MSD Capital once again investing) raised US$60 million for the company which Kobalt announced would largely be used to develop their technology and open new offices in Miami, Brazil, and South East Asia. This brought the total of equity raised by Kobalt to $126 million. At that point, Kobalt had also invested $100 million of the initial $153 million it had raised to "help finance the second strand of its business – label services where Kobalt either buys part or all of an artists' rights to help collect royalties on their behalf."

Wired reported in May 2015 that Kobalt was "the top independent music publisher in the UK and the second overall (to Sony/ATV) in the US," with around 8,000 artists and 600,000 songs in their catalogue. At the time, Kobalt continued to collect royalty money directly from services such as Spotify, iTunes, YouTube, and various collection agencies.

In December 2017, Kobalt acquired Songs Music Publishing for an estimated $150 million.

On 1 February 2021, Kobalt sold AWAL and Kobalt Neighboring Rights to Sony Music for $430 million, pending regulatory approval. The deal was completed in May 2021.

On 24 July 2022 Kobalt removed its entire catalogue of 700,000 tracks from Facebook and Instagram, two social media networks owned by Meta Platforms in the United States.

On 7 September 2022 private equity firm Francisco Partners acquired a controlling stake in Kobalt for an estimated $750 million.

In April 2024, the company renewed its commercial office lease for 10,000 sq/Ft at 2 Gansevoort St. in New York City for 10 years.

== Technology ==
Kobalt has developed a number of technologies to increase its own efficiency at tracking and collecting royalties. In 2005 the company debuted its Kobalt Portal, an online portal for artists to track and manage their own portfolios. In 2014, Kobalt introduced ProKlaim, a YouTube integration that by 2014 had significantly increased artist revenue on the platform. ProKlaim serves as an "advanced detection platform" by integrating with YouTube's own music detection technology. As of 2015, Kobalt had started describing their backend technology as "KORE." KORE manages rights, and tracks, collects and pay royalties across disparate markets, with the collected data accessible through the Kobalt Portal.

== Divisions ==
Division	Formed	Description
Kobalt Music Publishing	2001	Kobalt Music Publishing (KMP) is an independent, private music publisher that also provides creative services to artists. Explains The Telegraph, "the company aims to offer its clients a 'transparent' fee model, using sophisticated algorithms to monitor and collect music royalties from all areas of digital output, and breaking down these earnings for artists." As of February 2015, Kobalt owned 17.3% of the total market share among Hot 100 music publishers, ranking it second in the US after Universal.
Kobalt Label Services	2012	Introduced in January 2012, Kobalt Label Services (KLS) was founded when Kobalt acquired digital distributor AWAL. Kobalt Label Services provides record label services to artists, receiving a share of revenues, while artists retain ownership of their master rights. According to The Independent, the division allows artists to "maintain ownership of their work and control over when, how and where they will release their music."

== Current catalogue ==
Kobalt currently has licensing deals with around 8,000 artists and 600 publishing companies, representing a catalogue that totals around 600,000 songs.

=== Selected publishers ===
The following publishers are currently signed to Kobalt Music Group:

- B-Unique Music
- Big Life Music
- Blue Mountain Music
- Cherry Tree
- Communion Defend Music
- Disney Music Group (Australia)
- Vástago Producciones - Jesús Adrián Romero (México)
- Getty Images
- Hipgnosis Songs Fund
- Inside Assage
- Lateral
- Little Louder
- Monstercat
- MPCA
- MPL Communications
- National Geographic
- Nettwerk
- Owsla
- Polar Patrol Publishing
- San Remo
- Secretly Canadian
- Songs Music Publishing
- Soul Kitchen Music
- Ten
- Third and Verse

== Awards and nominations ==
The following is an incomplete list of awards won by Kobalt Music Group:

- 2009: Music Week Awards – Independent Music Publisher of the Year
- 2010: Music Week Awards – Independent Music Publisher of the Year
- 2011: Music Week Awards – Independent Music Publisher of the Year
- 2012: Music Week Awards – Independent Music Publisher of the Year
- 2013: Music Week Awards – Independent Music Publisher of the Year
- 2014: Music Week Awards – Independent Music Publisher of the Year
- 2015: Music Week Awards – Independent Music Publisher of the Year
- 2016: Music Week Awards – Independent Music Publisher of the Year
- 2017: Music Week Awards – Publisher of the Year

== See also ==
- List of record labels
- Kobalt Label Services
- Independent Music Companies Association
