= Bringin' It Down =

Studio album by Judge
- Released: 1989
- Studio: Normandy Studios
- Genre: Hardcore punk; heavy hardcore
- Label: Revelation
- Producer: John Porcell; Tom Soares

Judge chronology
Chung King Can Suck It (1989)	Bringin' It Down (1989)	There Will be Quiet... (1990)

Bringin' It Down is an LP released by the New York hardcore band Judge. It was released on Revelation Records in 1989. The original recording of the album was released under the title Chung King Can Suck It (with two additional tracks that did not make it onto Bringin' It Down). This recording, which had been made at Chung King Studios, was rejected by the band after thousands of dollars had been spent on it. Since there had been substantial pre-orders of Bringin' It Down the label printed 110 copies of the rejected recording under its alternate title, to satisfy demand until the band could re-record it at a different studio. The popularity of Judge in the hardcore straight edge scene, and the severely limited release, has made Chung King Can Suck It likely the most sought after and expensive hardcore record ever (though Revelation Records never profited from it). Copies, when they are sold, sell for over a thousand dollars.

== Track listing ==
All tracks are written by Judge.

No.	Title	Length
1.	"Take Me Away"	3:03
2.	"Bringin' it Down"	1:49
3.	"Hold Me Back"	1:58
4.	"Give It Up"	2:31
5.	"The Storm"	2:57
6.	"Hear Me"	2:01
7.	"Like You"	2:31
8.	"I've Lost..."	1:49
9.	"Where It Went"	3:44
Total length:		22:23
