= Gorilla Biscuits =

American hardcore punk band

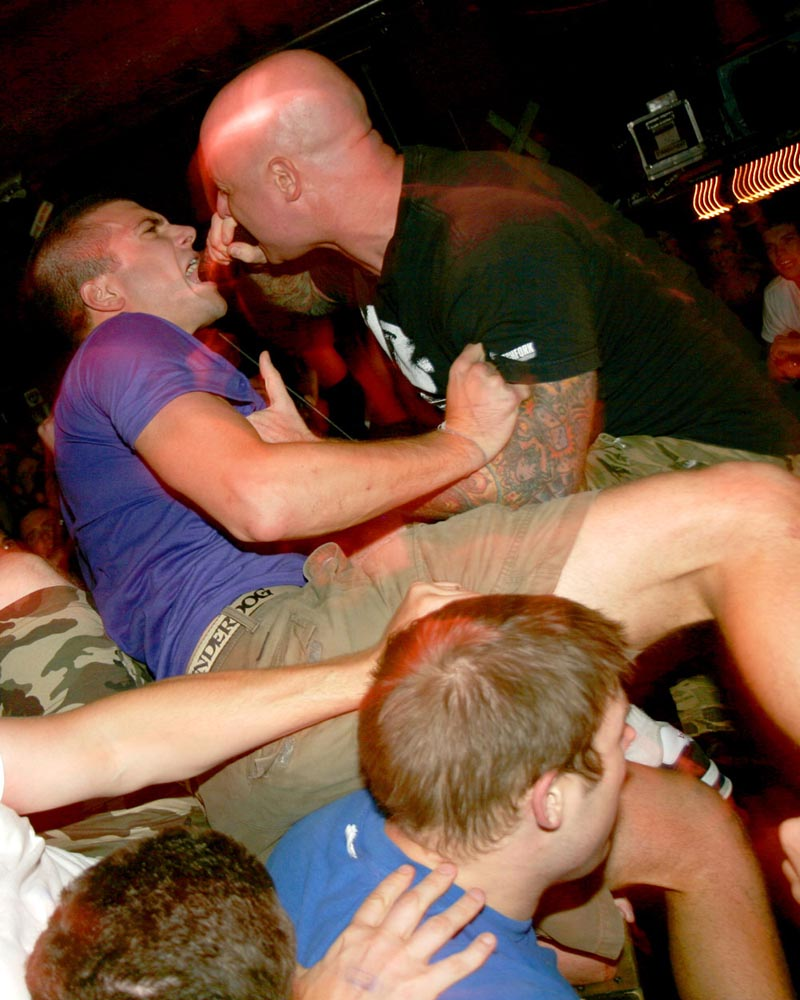
- Gorilla Biscuits performing live in 2006

Background information
- Origin: New York City, New York, U.S.
- Genres: Hardcore punk
- Years active: 1986–1992; 1997; 2005–present
- Label: Revelation
- Members: Anthony Civorelli; Walter Schreifels; Arthur Meow Smilios; Luke Abbey; Charlie Garriga
- Past members: Sammy Siegler; John Porcelly; Alex Brown

Gorilla Biscuits are an American hardcore punk band from New York City, formed in 1986. Signed to Revelation Records since 1988, Gorilla Biscuits are typically seen as one of the most prominent acts of the New York hardcore scene. The band's lineup currently consists of Anthony "Civ" Civorelli, Walter Schreifels, Arthur Smilios, and Luke Abbey.

Gorilla Biscuits was formed by Smilios and Civorelli after the two met in high school in Long Island, New York. The band released their self-titled debut EP in 1988, and their debut studio album, Start Today, in 1989. Start Today gave Gorilla Biscuits underground popularity following its release, and they have since been considered one of the most seminal youth crew bands.

== History ==
=== Early days (1986–1987) ===
Gorilla Biscuits were formed when Arthur Smilios and Nick Drysdale met Anthony "Civ" Civorelli while they were both attending the same high school in Queens, New York. All three were fans of the band Agnostic Front, and started going to hardcore shows at CBGB on weekends. There they met people like Ray Cappo and John Porcelly of the band Youth of Today.

Smilios sought to form a hardcore band and asked Civ to act as vocalist. However Civ was not interested in singing, and had to face the floor or wall during early gigs due to nerves. Members of the band Token Entry arranged a gig for the still unnamed band (Gorilla Biscuits used Token Entry's drummer, Ernie Parada for that first show), but needed a name to give it to the promoter. A popular drug in the area at that time was quaaludes, which people called "ape shit," or "gorilla biscuits" due to the pill's large size. Eventually the name evolved into Gorilla Biscuits, and though it was initially only meant to be temporary, they have continued to use it.

The band made a number of low-fi demo tapes which were sold at a dollar store. Their first official T-shirts were blue with an image of a gorilla riding a skateboard and were made using black magic markers and an ink blotter.

=== Gorilla Biscuits and Start Today (1988–1992) ===
Revelation Records featured the early Gorilla Biscuits song "Better Than You" on one of their compilations, and later released the eponymously titled Gorilla Biscuits 7-inch EP in 1988, which later became a hardcore hit. The band toured the United States and Europe twice. In 1989, the band released their first full-length album, Start Today, which became the biggest selling ever for Revelation Records, and was also the first album that the label issued on CD, alongside its vinyl and cassette versions, as part of the routine production. The band started writing material for a second LP (an unreleased song, "Distance", can be seen played by the band during a performance in the 1991 documentary Live In New York) which they never recorded, and eventually disbanded around the year 1992. Some of the members went on to play in a follow-up band, CIV. Besides singing for CIV, Civ now owns a tattoo studio on Long Island. Walter went on to form the post-hardcore band Quicksand. He then wrote the songs for and helped produce CIV's first album.

=== Reunions and the future of Gorilla Biscuits (1992–present) ===
Gorilla Biscuits re-united for one show in October 1997 at CBGB to benefit the family of then recently deceased Warzone singer Raybeez, and played another show at CBGB on August 14, 2005 as a benefit towards the club's legal costs, and again on September 3, 2006.

In 2006, Revelation Records re-issued their seminal recording Start Today. The album is re-mastered and features in-depth liner notes by Walter Schreifels. The band held a month-long re-union tour during the summer of 2006, and featured both exclusive 7-inches and exclusive Paul Frank T-shirts only available on tour stops.

In September 2007, Gorilla Biscuits performed a month-long tour across Europe, including stops in Germany, Spain, Switzerland, the Netherlands and England. In celebration of the European Tour, Paul Frank collaborated with Gorilla Biscuits again to produce an exclusive run of Gorilla Biscuits wallets. Only one was sold at each Paul Frank store worldwide.

On May 28, 2011, Gorilla Biscuits headlined the Black N Blue Bowl at Webster Hall (formerly the Ritz) in New York City.

On June 8, 9 and 10 2012, Gorilla Biscuits played the Epic Revelation Records 25 Year Anniversary shows at The Glasshouse in Pomona, CA. Also on the bills were Youth of Today, Sick Of It All, Shai Hulud, Bold, No For An Answer, Statue and Underdog.

On August 6, 2016, during Gorilla Biscuits' set at Philadelphia's This Is Hardcore festival, Civorelli took a break to introduce the song "Degradation" that rails against nazis in the 1980s punk scene. He also commented on the Black Lives Matter movement, saying:

In 2016 people still have to wear shirts that say 'Black Lives Matter'. No shit. Brown, white, yellow, black, we all fucking matter. Everybody here matters. Do not let the media, schools, institutions, influence you. We are one family, one people.

Apparently, the statement did not sit well with some attendees at the festival who understood the speech as an endorsement of the anti-Black Lives Matter movement 'All Lives Matter'. Later, Civorelli said on his Facebook that the controversy had been a gross misunderstanding of his words:

“…I’m surprised that this was taken in any other way then it was intended. My point was and I thought it was clear that in 2016 we as a people should not need such things to be on a shirt and they should be universal truths. We are all in this together. If you know the band and the lyrics and what we have always stood for this should be clear. Also look at the lyrics to “degradation” and “things we say” especially the line, “some people are so quick to judge let’s get the judgement straight”…”

On September 4, 2019, guitarist Alex Brown died of a basal ganglia stroke. He was replaced by Judge, Quicksand and former CIV guitarist Charlie Garriga.

== Members ==
=== Current ===
- Anthony Civorelli – vocals (1986–1992, 1997, 2005–present)
- Walter Schreifels – guitars (1986–1991, 1997, 2005–present)
- Arthur Meow Smilios – bass (1986–1992, 1997, 2005–present)
- Luke Abbey – drums (1986–1989, 1997, 2005–present)
- Charlie Garriga – guitars (2019–present)

=== Former ===
- Sammy Siegler – drums (1990–1992)
- John Porcelly – guitars
- Alex Brown – guitars (1988–1989, 1997, 2005–2019; his death)

== Discography ==
Title	Release date	Notes	Label
Original 1987 Tape Demo Gorilla Biscuits	1988	Bootleg, can also be found on Walter Sings The Hits.	99 Records
Gorilla Biscuits	1988	First 7″ EP	Revelation
Start Today	1989	Their debut studio album and final record before disbanding.	Revelation
Having A Great Time... Wish You Were Here	1991	Last live show, soundboard recording from Germany in 1991.	99 records
Walter Sings the Hits	199?	Bootleg, contains a full version of Start Today 12" (w/ Walter on vocals instead of Civ), Moondog 7", Live In Germany 7", Live At The Safari Club 7", Demo '87 7" and Demo '86 7". (made in Germany)	No Label
A Puzzle of 38 Pieces	199?	Bootleg	?
Live At CBGB =8/14/05	2005	Bootleg	?
At the Matinee	2006	Sold during the 2006 re-union tour. Only 20 copies were sold at each stop. It featured two brand new songs by the original line-up.	Self-released

== Compilations ==
- New York City Hardcore:Together, 7″ (1987, Revelation Records)
- New York City Hardcore: The Way It Is, CD (1988/1992 (re-issue), Revelation Records)
- Where the Wild Things Are (1989) Blackout Records
- Rebuilding (7") (1990) (Temperance Records)
- Threat: Music That Inspired The Movie, CD (2006, Kings Mob Productions)
