= Ray Cappo =

American punk rock vocalist

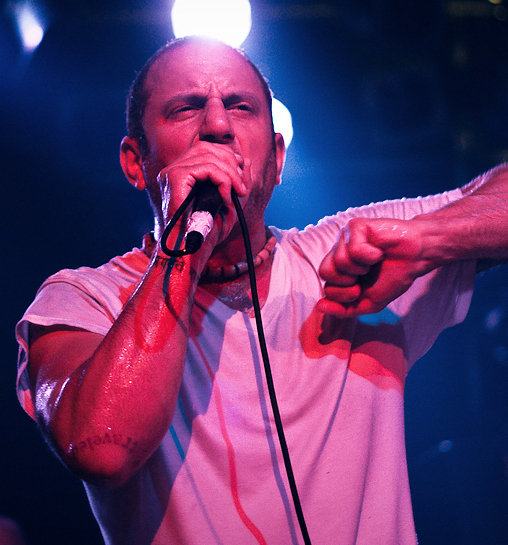
- Cappo performing in 2010

Background information
- Also known as: Raghunath Das; Ray of Today
- Origin: Connecticut, U.S.
- Genres: Hardcore punk, krishnacore, melodic hardcore, pop punk, indie, folk
- Occupation: Singer

Ray Cappo, also known as Raghunath Das, is an American punk rock musician best known as the vocalist for the bands Youth of Today and Shelter and as founder of the independent record labels Revelation Records and Equal Vision Records.

Originally from Connecticut, Cappo played drums for the band Violent Children. Before moving to New York City in the 1980s, Youth of Today had already made an impact on the straight edge hardcore punk scene.

== Career ==
=== Earlier career ===
Cappo was occasionally a guest DJ for college radio station WXCI, in Danbury, Connecticut, on a radio show called "The Adventure Jukebox" hosted by Darryl Ohrt of the band No Milk on Tuesday. Cappo played a wide array of hardcore music on the program, largely culled from his massive collection of records, rare unsigned EPs, and demo tapes. During this time, Cappo enthusiastically supported local hardcore shows including gigs by many early hardcore bands such as No Milk on Tuesday, 76% Uncertain, Seizure, End Product, and Abusive Action, and was often mentioned in the liner notes of their records.

=== Youth of Today ===
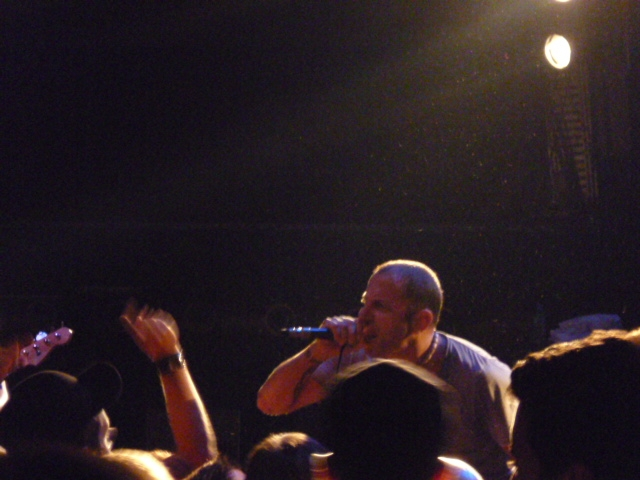
Cappo performing with Youth of Today in Germany, 2010

Along with guitarist John Porcelly, also known as Porcell, Cappo started the seminal hardcore band Youth of Today in 1985, which quickly became one of the most well-known bands in the New York hardcore scene. Based on their straight edge ethics and a fast, aggressive sound, they created a subgenre known as Youth Crew, influencing a large number of bands. An important figure in the early days of Youth of Today was Kevin Seconds, singer of the Reno, Nevada, band 7 Seconds. Kevin not only influenced the band, but also released their first EP, "Can't Close My Eyes" on his Positive Force Records. Before disbanding in 1990, Youth of Today released two 7-inch EPs (one later remixed and released as a 12-inch) and two LPs, widely considered to be some of the most influential American hardcore records of their time.

=== Revelation Records ===
In 1987, along with Jordan Cooper, Cappo started Revelation Records. The label's first release was Warzone's "Lower East Side Crew". This was soon followed by a compilation entitled New York Hardcore 1987: Together, or simply the Together Compilation. This compilation included tracks by Youth of Today and Bold, (formerly Crippled Youth). This was also the first time bands like Gorilla Biscuits, Sick of It All, and Side by Side would be recorded and heard all over the world. Revelation would soon expand its roster westward, releasing records from California bands like Chain of Strength and No For an Answer. Today, Revelation remains a functioning record label operated by Cooper, who moved from New Haven, Connecticut, to Huntington Beach, California, in 1990.

=== 1990s and Krishnacore ===
As Youth of Today began to wind down, Cappo found himself drawn to Krishna Consciousness, due in large part to his study of religions that embraced his vegetarian and straight edge ideals. He became a devotee and an outspoken proponent of the ideologies laid out in the Bhagavad Gita. Cappo resolved to create a final album to express his beliefs. The album was a marked departure from the style of Youth of Today, and Revelation Records decided to release it under a new band, which became known as Shelter. Cappo again found himself starting a record label to release bands with a Krishna-conscious message, the still operating Equal Vision Records. The rise of Shelter would unexpectedly create a musical subgenre called Krishnacore, with bands such as Cro-Mags as its spiritual forefathers and 108 among its main proponents.

=== Better Than a Thousand ===
Better Than a Thousand was a band founded in 1997 by drummer Ken Olden and guitarist Graham Land after their previous band Battery broke up. The duo recruited Cappo as their vocalist and signed to Revelation Records. They recorded their first album, Just One, in five days while Shelter was on break from touring, and released it in July 1997. Cappo recorded his vocals for the album in a bedroom studio in two days. They got to work immediately on their second album, with Olden saying they needed to follow up Just One with something more focused. That second album, Value Driven, was recorded in another home studio setup in 1998, and released that year. They toured for the album, then broke up after Cappo moved to California. In 2020, Olden remixed and remastered both albums for a reissue package released by End Hits Records. The reissues included the original albums and five rare bonus songs, and some editions included a 36-page fanzine called We Must Believe, previously unpublished photos and liner notes.

=== 2000s ===
Cappo lives with his family in East Chatham, New York, and is active as a yoga teacher. He continues his association with the Hare Krishna community in the area and is an avid mixed martial arts fan and practitioner. Aside from the European Youth of Today reunion tour in 2003 and occasional American and European reunion shows, Cappo has been only intermittently involved in the hardcore music scene.

In 2006, Cappo released another Shelter record entitled Eternal on Good Life Recordings, and embarked on a European tour. He maintains a website for his yoga and raw food diet classes and an email list promoting raw foods and featuring recipes and inspirational quotations. Cappo also sponsors tours of India featuring important sites for practitioners of yoga.

In 2020, Cappo launched the podcast Wisdom of the Sages in collaboration with fellow Hare Krishna devotee Kaustubha Das. The show features musicians alongside senior devotees of the Hare Krishna movement.

In 2024, Mandala Publishing published From Punk to Monk: A Memoir which features a foreword by Moby.

== Discography ==
with Reflex from Pain

- Checkered Future (1983)

with Violent Children

- Violent Children (1983)
- Violent Children (1984)
- Skate Straight (1984)

with Youth of Today

- Connecticut Fun compilation (1985)
- Can't Close My Eyes EP (1986, Positive Force Records)
- Break Down the Walls (1987)
- New York City Hardcore – Together compilation (1987, Revelation Records)
- New York City Hardcore – The Way It Is compilation (1988, Revelation Records)
- We're Not in This Alone (1988)
- Youth of Today (1990)

with Shelter

- Perfection of Desire (1990)
- No Compromise (1990)
- In Defense of Reality (1991)
- Attaining the Supreme (1993)
- Mantra (1995, Roadrunner Records)
- Beyond Planet Earth (1997, Roadrunner Records)
- When 20 Summers Pass (2000, Victory Records)
- The Purpose, the Passion (2001, Supersoul)
- Eternal (2006, Good Life Recordings)

with Ray & Porcell

- Ray & Porcell (1991)

with Better Than a Thousand

- Just One (1997, Revelation Records)
- Value Driven (1998, Epitaph)
- "Self Worth" single (1999, Grapes of Wrath)

with Story of the Year

- Falling Down (2003, Page Avenue)
