= Shelter (band) =

American hardcore punk band

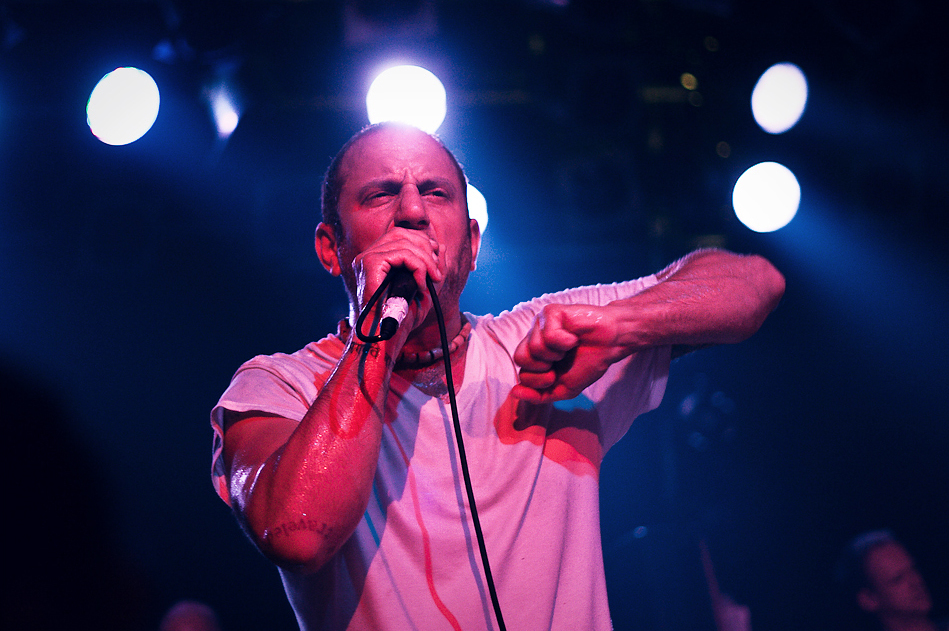
- Vocalist Ray Cappo in 2010

Background information
- Origin: New York City, U.S.
- Genres: Melodic hardcore; hardcore punk; post-hardcore; Krishnacore
- Years active: 1991–present
- Labels: Equal Vision; Revelation; Roadrunner; Victory; Supersoul; Good Life
- Members: Ray Cappo; John Porcelly; Sammy Siegler; Chris Interrante

Shelter is an American Hare Krishna hardcore punk band formed by Youth of Today vocalist Ray Cappo in 1991. Because of the religious Hindu-oriented messages in its lyrics, Shelter's subgenre has been dubbed by some as Krishnacore.

== History ==
In 2001, Shelter released the album The Purpose, The Passion. In 2002, with a new drummer and new guitarist, the band toured Europe and the eastern United States in support of the record, before going on extended hiatus.

In 2005, vocalist Ray Cappo recorded an album titled Eternal, with ten new songs and a remake of the track "In Defense of Reality". The album was released in May 2006 by Good Life Recordings. Cappo also did a European tour with a few Dutch hardcore musicians functioning as his touring band.

Shelter played two reunion shows in 2011: Gothenburg, Sweden, on June 16, and Reading, Pennsylvania, on June 26.

The band reunited again in 2018 for a US tour and a European festival date, with Sammy Siegler on drums and Chris Interrante, aka Krsna Caitanya, on bass. Opening acts included Dave Smalley's Don't Sleep on the East Coast and Washington, D.C.–based hardcore band GIVE in the west.

Since 2018, Shelter consists of Cappo on vocals, John Porcelly on guitar, Siegler on drums, and Interrante on bass.

== Band members ==
Current

- Ray "Raghunath" Cappo – lead vocals (1990–present)
- John "Paramananda" Porcelly – guitar (1993–2000, 2018–present)
- Chris "Krsna Caitanya" Interrante – bass, backing vocals (1991–1993, 2018–present)
- Sammy Siegler – drums (1990, 2018–present)

Past

- Tom Capone – guitar (1990)
- Todd Knapp – guitar (1990)
- Graham Land – guitar (1990–1991)
- Vic DiCara – guitar (1991)
- Norman Brannon – guitar (1993)
- Daniel "Supergrass" Johansson – guitar, vocals (2001)
- Kim "Sri" Shopav – guitar (2001)
- Ken Olden – guitar (2006)
- Javier Casas – guitar (2024)
- Bryan K. Christner – guitar
- Dave Ware – bass (1990)
- Yasomatinandana Das – bass (1990–1991)
- Adam Blake – bass (1995)
- Franklin Rhi – bass (1997)
- Tim Brooks – bass
- Bill Knapp – drums (1990)
- Eric Dailey – drums (1991–1993)
- Dave DiCenso – drums (1995–1997, 2001–2006)
- Trey Files – drums (2000)
- Alex Garcia-Rivera drums
- Aaron Rossi – drums
- Mackie Jayson – drums
- Sean Sellers – drums
- Roy Mayorga – drums

== Discography ==
- Perfection of Desire (1990)
- Quest for Certainty (1992)
- Attaining the Supreme (1993)
- Shelter Bhajan (1993)
- Standard Temple Songs (1993)
- Mantra (1995)
- Beyond Planet Earth (1997)
- When 20 Summers Pass (2000)
- The Purpose, the Passion (2001)
- Eternal (2006)

== See also ==
- Animal rights and punk subculture
