= John Porcelly =

American guitarist (born 1967)

- Also known as: Paramananda Das; Slam
- Born: February 3, 1967 (age 59); United States
- Genres: Punk rock, hardcore punk
- Occupation: Musician
- Instrument: Guitar

John "Porcell" Porcelly (born February 3, 1967), also known as Paramananda Das, is an American musician, best known as the guitarist for the 1980s hardcore bands Young Republicans, Violent Children, Youth of Today, and Judge. He also sang in Project X (under the pseudonym Slam), and has had stints in other bands such as Bold and Gorilla Biscuits. More recently he has played in bands like Shelter, Never Surrender and Last of the Famous.

He also wrote and published the fanzine War on Illusion and ran the record label/fanzine Schism along with Alex Brown (Gorilla Biscuits/Side By Side/Project X). Porcelly currently runs the record label Fight Fire with Fire.

In 1991, Porcelly formed a band with Zack de la Rocha based at the Revelation Records headquarters in Huntington Beach, California, in which Rocha was the vocalist and Porcelly played guitar. Although the group never officially had a name, at one point in time, Rocha proposed the name "Rage Against the Machine", however Porcelly believed the name to be too long, leading to Rocha using it as the name for his other band at the time. The band's music merged elements of hardcore punk and hip hop.

In 2006, Bold reunited with Porcelly on second guitar and began a European tour while also writing and recording a new album. He also sang a live set of 80s straight edge cover songs with the Florida band Gator Bait at Florida's Significant Records Fest. The set included songs from his previous projects Youth of Today, Project X and Judge.

In 2008, Porcelly launched his straight-edge clothing company "True Till Death".

== Personal life ==
Prior to his joining of Shelter, Porcelly took interest in the spiritual movement 'International Society for Krishna Consciousness' and has maintained interest in it since; he is an active member of ISKCON. He is referred in ISKCON by his 'spiritual' name "Paramananda Das". He travels across the United States teaching and lecturing Vinyasa and Bhakti Yoga. He has been straight edge and a vegetarian for most of his life.
