= Youth of Today =

American hardcore punk band

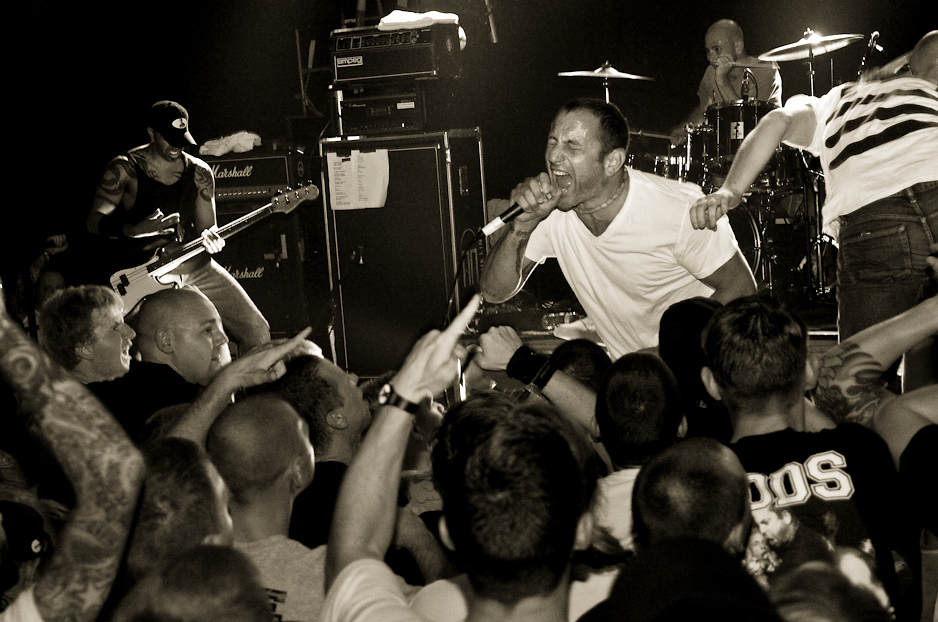
- Youth of Today performing in Germany in 2010

Background information
- Origin: Danbury, Connecticut, U.S.
- Genres: Hardcore punk
- Years active: 1985–1990; 1994; 1999; 2003–2004; 2010–present
- Labels: Revelation; Caroline; Wishing Well; Positive Force
- Spinoffs: Shelter; Better Than a Thousand
- Members: Ray Cappo; John Porcelly; Walter Schreifels; Sammy Siegler

Youth of Today is an American hardcore punk band, initially active from 1985 to 1990 before reforming in 2010. The band played a major role in establishing the "Youth Crew" subculture of hardcore, both espousing and evolving the philosophies of the straight edge and vegetarian lifestyles.

After the band's dissolution, vocalist Ray Cappo became involved in the Hare Krishna movement and formed the bands Shelter and Better Than a Thousand. Youth of Today is currently composed of Cappo and guitarist John Porcelly, both founding members, as well as bassist Walter Schreifels and drummer Sammy Siegler.

== History ==
Youth of Today was formed in Danbury, Connecticut, in 1985 by two members of the hardcore band Violent Children, Ray Cappo (vocals) and John Porcelly (Porcell) (guitar) were aiming to start a straight edge band at a time when most old school straight edge bands had disbanded. Having difficulty finding a bassist and drummer, Ray and Porcell found help from two high school friends, Graham Phillips and Darren Pesce, who had played with Porcell in a band called The Young Republicans in the past. Youth of Today played their first show at The Anthrax on July 2, 1985.

=== Can't Close My Eyes ===
In 1985, Youth of Today recorded their debut EP Can't Close My Eyes for Kevin Seconds' (singer of the popular hardcore band 7 Seconds) label Positive Force Records with additional lyrics by John L Hancock III (a.k.a. Ratboy). At the same time the band contributed five songs to the Connecticut Fun compilation album; these tracks would later be combined with the aforementioned release to make the album version of Can't Close My Eyes that is commonly recognized today.

After touring for a while both Graham and Darren left the band, and two members of New York band Straight Ahead joined Ray and John, Craig Setari (bass) and Tommy Carroll (drums). Tommy left during their second tour, and Drew Thomas, drummer of brother band Crippled Youth (who later changed their name to Bold), was asked to finish the rest of the tour.

=== Break Down the Walls ===
A short while later, Underdog vocalist Richie Birkenhead joined the band on second guitar. With this line-up, the first Youth of Today album was recorded, entitled Break Down the Walls, and released by Wishingwell Records, the label of California straight edge bands Unity and Uniform Choice. Soon after recording the album Drew was replaced by Mike "Judge" (later to be the singer, along with John Porcelly on guitar, in the band Judge).

Craig left to reform Straight Ahead (and later played in Agnostic Front and Sick of It All), and Walter Schreifels of Gorilla Biscuits joined on as the new bassist. At the end of the Break Down the Walls tour that followed the release of the LP, second guitarist Richie left the band to concentrate on singing in Underdog, and with that line-up Youth of Today appeared with two songs on the Revelation Records compilation "New York Hardcore - The Way It Is", alongside New York bands like Bold, Gorilla Biscuits, Side By Side and Sick of It All.

=== We're Not in This Alone ===
At the end of 1987, Mike left the band, and Sammy Siegler became the new drummer. In 1988, Youth of Today recorded their classic second LP We're Not in This Alone, which was released in America by Caroline Records and in Europe by both We Bite Records and Funhouse Records. The beginning of the next year, Youth of Today, whose line-up was steady at last, did a European tour, playing shows in: Sweden, Norway, Denmark, Germany, Switzerland, Austria, Yugoslavia, Italy, France, Belgium, the Netherlands and England. In 1990, Youth of Today decided to split and recorded 4 songs for a farewell 7-inch with Revelation Records. Three of those songs appeared on the single "Disengage".

The breakup of Youth of Today has been described by some commentators as marking a decline in the second wave of the straight edge movement, which emerged around 1985 and reached its between 1988 and 1990. Alongside bands such as Uniform Choice, Gorilla Biscuits, No For An Answer, and Chain of Strength, Youth of Today contributed to the development of a style that combined straight edge principles with fast and energetic hardcore music. The band is also cited as an influence on numerous subsequent acts and on segments of youth culture associated with the straight edge movement.

=== Post-breakup ===
Ray Cappo started the Hare Krishna band Shelter, and was later joined by Porcell. Walter was playing guitar in Gorilla Biscuits from 1986 until their end, and was joined on the European tour of Gorilla Biscuits in 1990 by Porcell and Sammy on guitar and drums. After the split of Gorilla Biscuits, Walter started Quicksand, and later on, Rival Schools and Walking Concert. Sammy later played drums in CIV (which featured members of Gorilla Biscuits) and multiple other bands.

=== Reunion ===
Aside from several one-off reunion shows, Youth of Today did a European reunion tour in 2003 with original members Ray, Porcell and Sammy. Ray's friend Ken Olden from Battery and Better Than a Thousand filled in on bass. In fall 2010, they again started for a small reunion tour through Europe starting on September 16 in Lyss, Switzerland. A first-ever South American tour was scheduled for the first week of December 2010, taking Youth of Today to countries like Peru, Chile, Argentina and Brazil. They played two shows in Russia and two in Oslo, Norway, during the third week in March 2011. Youth of Today played the U Street Music Hall in Washington, D.C., on June 3, 2011; opening bands were Mouthpiece and Give. They played a show at the Glasshouse in Pomona, California, and another show at the Chaos in Tejas festival in June 2011. They played at the Getaway Rock Festival in Gävle, Sweden, on July 7–9, 2011. Youth of Today played at New Direction Fest No. 2 in Olbia, Sardinia, on July 10, 2011. They also played This Is Hardcore on August 12; the show sold out. The group played Riot Fest in Chicago opening for Danzig and Doyle playing Misfits songs on October 7, 2011. The band played at the Within These Walls fest in Mesa, Arizona, on September 21, 2012. On April 28, 2016, Youth of Today played in Berlin, Germany, and the next day in Meerhout, Belgium. The show included Sammy Siegler on drums and Walter Schreifels on bass.

== Band members ==
=== Current members ===
- Ray Cappo – vocals (1985–1990, 1994, 1999, 2004, 2010–present)
- John Porcelly – guitar (1985–1990, 1994, 1999, 2004, 2010–present)
- Walter Schreifels – bass (1987–1990, 1994, 2016–present)
- Sammy Siegler – drums (1987–1990, 1994, 1999, 2004, 2016–present)

=== Former members ===
- Graham Phillips – bass (1985–1986)
- Darren Pesce – drums (1985–1986)
- Craig Setari – bass (1986–1987)
- Tommy Carroll – drums (1986)
- Drew Thomas – drums (1986–1987)
- Richie Birkenhead – guitar (1986–1987)
- Mike "Judge" Ferraro – drums (1987)
- Lukey Luke – bass (1987)
- Tim Brooks – bass (1999)
- Ken Olden – bass (2004, 2010–2016)
- Vinny Panza – drums (2010–2016)

=== Former live members ===
- Kevin Seconds – drums (1986)
- Steve Reddy – vocals (1987; for one show in 1987 - Ray played bass, Walter broke his ankle before the show)

== Discography ==
=== Albums ===
Year	Album name	Record label
1985	Can't Close My Eyes	Positive Force Records (Revelation Records 1997)
1986	Break Down the Walls	Wishing Well Records (Revelation Records 1988)
1988	We're Not in This Alone	Caroline Records (Revelation Records 1990)
1990	Youth of Today EP	Revelation Records

=== Singles ===
- Can't Close My Eyes 7-inch (1985, Positive Force Records No. 4; has since been re-issued in LP or CD format on four different labels: Schism Records, Caroline Records, We Bite Records, and Revelation Records)
- Disengage 7-inch/CD (Revelation Records, 1990)

=== Live albums/singles ===
- Yesterday 7-inch (1991) (Unofficial Release)
- Take a Stand 12-inch/ LP/ CD (Lost and Found Records, 1992)
- Anarchy in Vienna LP (1989) (Unofficial)
- Live at Van Hall 1989, Amsterdam 7-inch (Commitment Records, 1989)
- Live at CBGB's 7-inch (Reality Records, 1998)

=== Music videos ===
- "No More" (1988)

=== Compilations ===
- Make It Work 7-inch
- Connecticut Fun LP (1985)
- New York City Hardcore: Together 7-inch (1987, Revelation Records)
- New York City Hardcore – The Way It Is LP (1988, Revelation Records)
- Hold Your Ground CD
- Sunday Matinee LP/ CD
- In-Flight Program CD
- Voice of the Voiceless LP/ CD
- Another Shot for Bracken LP
- A Time We'll Remember LP
- We Bite 7-inch
- We Bite 100 2×LP
- The Sound of the Streets 4×CD
- Revelation 100 2×LP/CD (Revelation Records)

== See also ==
- Animal rights and punk subculture
