= Revelation Records =

American independent record label

- Founded: 1987
- Founder: Jordan Cooper; Ray Cappo
- Genre: Hardcore punk; metalcore; post-hardcore; emo
- Country of origin: U.S.
- Official website: revelationrecords.com

Revelation Records is an independent record label focusing originally and primarily on hardcore punk. The label is known for releases by bands such as Youth of Today, Warzone, Sick of It All, Quicksand, Side By Side, Chain of Strength, Shelter, Judge, No For An Answer, Gorilla Biscuits, and Texas Is the Reason.

Revelation, along with the bands it put out in the late 1980s, is usually credited with creating and cementing the "youth crew" sound as well as New York hardcore, which bridged the gap from the earlier bands of almost a decade before and helped carry the music through the early 1990s. Some of the label's best selling releases have been Gorilla Biscuits' Start Today, Inside Out's No Spiritual Surrender, and the In-Flight Program compilation.

== History ==
Formerly of New Haven, Connecticut, it is now based in Huntington Beach, California. It was founded in 1987 by owner Jordan Cooper, along with Ray Cappo of Youth of Today, with the sole intent of producing the Warzone Lower East Side Crew 7-inch. Within the year, they put out two more releases and a limited 4th pressing of Youth of Today's Can't Close My Eyes 7-inch, which had been originally released on Positive Force Records, just for the two of them to trade for vintage G.I.Joes and other action figures. In the first three years, the label put out 23 releases and pressed approximately 50,000 records, and it has continued to release an average of 7–8 albums a year.

Cappo left the business in 1988, to focus on his band Shelter. He also started his own label Equal Vision Records (which he later sold to Youth of Today roadie, former Revelation employee and friend, Steve Reddy), though his albums were still released by Revelation after that, and he also operated Supersoul Records.

The label put out several definitive hardcore and metalcore records in the late 1990s and early 2000s, with notable releases coming from Damnation A.D., Will Haven, Shai Hulud, Curl Up and Die, and Himsa. However, by the mid-2000s, Revelation Records had seemingly fallen by the wayside, with very few releases between 2004 and 2006. However, the label is returning to its former stature as a premier old-school hardcore label with strong releases from newer bands like Down to Nothing, Shook Ones, and Sinking Ships.

== Artists ==
- Battery
- Be Well
- Big Laugh
- Birdlegs
- Bold
- By a Thread
- Calling Hours
- Capital
- Chain of Strength
- CIV
- Cosmic Joke
- Curl Up and Die
- Dag Nasty
- Dare
- Down To Nothing
- Drain
- Drowningman
- Elliott
- End of a Year
- Fall Silent
- Farside
- Fell to Low
- Forced Order
- Gameface
- Garrison
- Gorilla Biscuits
- Himsa
- In My Eyes
- Inside Out
- Into Another
- Judge
- Ignite
- Kill Holiday
- Kiss It Goodbye
- Lesbos in Love
- Living Hell
- Morning Again
- Mouthpiece
- The Movielife
- The Nerve Agents
- New Found Glory
- No For An Answer
- On the Might of Princes
- Paint It Black
- Planet on a Chain
- The Plot to Blow Up the Eiffel Tower
- Praise
- Primal Rite
- Quicksand
- Rage Against The Machine
- The Rival Mob
- Self Defense Family
- Sense Field
- Shades Apart
- Shai Hulud
- Shelter
- Shook Ones
- Sick of It All
- Side by Side
- Sincebyman
- Sinking Ships
- Spaced
- Speedway
- Straight Ahead
- Supertouch
- Texas Is the Reason
- Title Fight
- Turning Point
- Violent Reaction
- Warzone
- Where Fear and Weapons Meet
- World Be Free
- Youth of Today

== Discography ==
Year (First pressing)	Number	Artist	Title	Ref.
1989	-1	Judge	Chung King Can Suck It	
1987	1	Warzone	Lower East Side Crew	
1987	2	Various artists	Together	
1987	3	Sick Of It All	Sick Of It All	
1988	4	Gorilla Biscuits	Gorilla Biscuits	
1988	5	Side By Side	You're Only Young Once...	
1988	6	No For An Answer	You Laugh	
1988	7	Various artists	New York City Hardcore: The Way It Is	
1988	8	Youth of Today	Break Down the Walls	
1988	9	Bold	Speak Out	
1989	10	Chain of Strength	True Till Death	
1989	11	Bold	Bold	
1989	12	Gorilla Biscuits	Start Today	
1989	13	Slipknot	Slipknot	
1989	14	Judge	New York Crew	
1989	15	Judge	Bringin' It Down	
1990	16	Shelter	Perfection of Desire	
1990	17	Youth of Today	Youth of Today	
1990	18	Quicksand	Quicksand	
1990	19	Inside Out	No Spiritual Surrender	
1990	20	Judge	There Will Be Quiet...	
1991	21	Supertouch	The Earth Is Flat	
1990	22	Burn	Burn	
1991	23	Ray & Porcell	Ray & Porcell	
1991	24	Into Another	Into Another	
1992	25	Farside	Rochambeau	
1993	26	Into Another	Creepy Eepy	
1993	27	Iceburn	Hephaestus	
1993	28	Underdog	Demos	
1993	29	Statue	Filter the Infection	
1993	30	Mike Judge & Old Smoke	Sights	
1994	31	Orange 9mm	Orange 9mm	
1994	32	Sense Field	Killed for Less	
