= No Spiritual Surrender =

EP by Inside Out
- Released: 1990
- Genre: Hardcore punk
- Length: 9:45 (Vinyl); 14:24 (Cassette/CD)
- Label: Revelation Records
- Producers: Bill Krodel, Don Fury

No Spiritual Surrender is a 7-inch EP by American hardcore punk band Inside Out, released by Revelation Records in 1990. It was their only release before their breakup in 1991. After the band broke up, it was released on CD with two additional tracks that were from the same recording session, but did not fit on the 7-inch.

The EP features Zack de la Rocha before he went on to form and front Rage Against the Machine. The album also features Vic DiCara, later of 108 playing the guitar, Mark Hayworth from Hardstance and Gorilla Biscuits playing the bass guitar and Chris Bratton from Chain of Strength playing the drums. Mike D from the Beastie Boys said "it's a good embodiment of hardcore that hasn't been done so well since Minor Threat", in a 1995 interview.

The band performed at Unsound, Reading, PA, and they played songs "Turn And Face, Deathbed" and more that were allegedly for their LP "Rage Against The Machine"

== Track listing ==
7" vinyl
No.	Title	Length
1.	"Burning Fight"	3:26
2.	"Undertone"	1:41
3.	"By A Thread"	2:20
4.	"No Spiritual Surrender"	2:58
Total length:		9:45

Cassette/CD bonus tracks
No.	Title	Length
5.	"Sacrifice"	2:30
6.	"Redemption"	2:09
Total length:		14:24

== Personnel ==
- Zack de la Rocha - vocals
- Vic DiCara - guitar
- Mark Hayworth - bass
- Chris Bratton - drums
