= Inside Out (band) =

American hardcore punk band

- Origin: Orange County, California, U.S.
- Genres: Hardcore punk; melodic hardcore
- Years active: 1988–1991, 1993
- Label: Revelation
- Spinoffs: Rage Against the Machine; 108; Shelter
- Spinoff of: Hardstance; No For An Answer; Chain of Strength
- Past members: Zack de la Rocha; Vic DiCara; Mark Hayworth; Chris Bratton; Alex Barreto; Sterling Wilson; Mike Down; Joey Piro; Mike Rosas

Inside Out was a hardcore punk band from Orange County, California. It was fronted by Zack de la Rocha, later of Rage Against the Machine.

== Biography ==
Inside Out existed from August 1988 to roughly fall of 1991, releasing a single 7-inch EP, No Spiritual Surrender, in 1990, on Revelation Records (later converted to six song CD). They played up and down the West Coast and even toured the East Coast once before their breakup in 1991. Many of their songs' themes are spiritual, but not necessarily religious. They had written material for a second record, to be titled Rage Against the Machine (hence the name for de la Rocha's next band), but the band broke up shortly after their guitarist, Vic DiCara, left the band to become a Hare Krishna monk. Vic later started 108, a Krishna-themed hardcore band, and briefly joined Burn, playing guitar in both.

Inside Out performed on California radio station KXLU, showcasing a number of new songs. The quality of the recording on the show, while adequate for a radio broadcast, is not on par with that of the band's EP recording. Copies of their on-air radio broadcast and various live sets have circulated the tape trading underground and file sharing world for years as popular items. In early 2013, a high quality version of one of their final shows from May 1991 surfaced and was remastered and made publicly available. Lyrics to the previously unreleased songs "Rage Against the Machine" and "Darkness of Greed" were deciphered, and together they give new context to the early beginnings of Rage Against the Machine. Some of their songs focus on issues in society and in the USA (Redemption, Burning Fight) and some are personal to members of the band (Sacrifice, By a Thread). In October 2016, a VHS video of a 1990 Inside Out show in Reading, PA surfaced and was made available online. The Reading, PA video includes a number of [Inside Out]'s unreleased material. "Burning Fight", "Deathbed" (which would go on to be a 108 song), Undertone (which features the "wake up" refrain used in Rage Against the Machine's song "Wake Up"), "Empty Days", "Redemption", "Blind Oppressor", "Turn" and "Face".

== Remixes ==
In 2006, the track "No Spiritual Surrender" was contributed to the mashup album Threat: Music That Inspired the Movie, where it was remixed by Oktopus from Dälek and dubbed "Ghost in the Machine".

== Musical style and legacy ==
Inside Out were a hardcore punk band, in particular, they were a part of its youth crew subculture. They cited influences including the Faith, Dag Nasty, Minor Threat, Bad Brains and Led Zeppelin. Just prior to the band's breakup, the music being written was significantly more influenced by hip hop, particularly Run-DMC.

Songs were composed by DiCara and de la Rocha evenly, with some songs having instrumentals and lyrics written by DiCara and some by de la Rocha while others were collaborations between the two.

They have been cited as an influence by Have Heart, Stick to Your Guns, Linkin Park, Turnstile, One Step Closer, Refused, Incendiary, Coalesce and Mouthpiece. In 2026 Turnstile performed an Inside Out cover at BBC Radio 1.

== Members ==
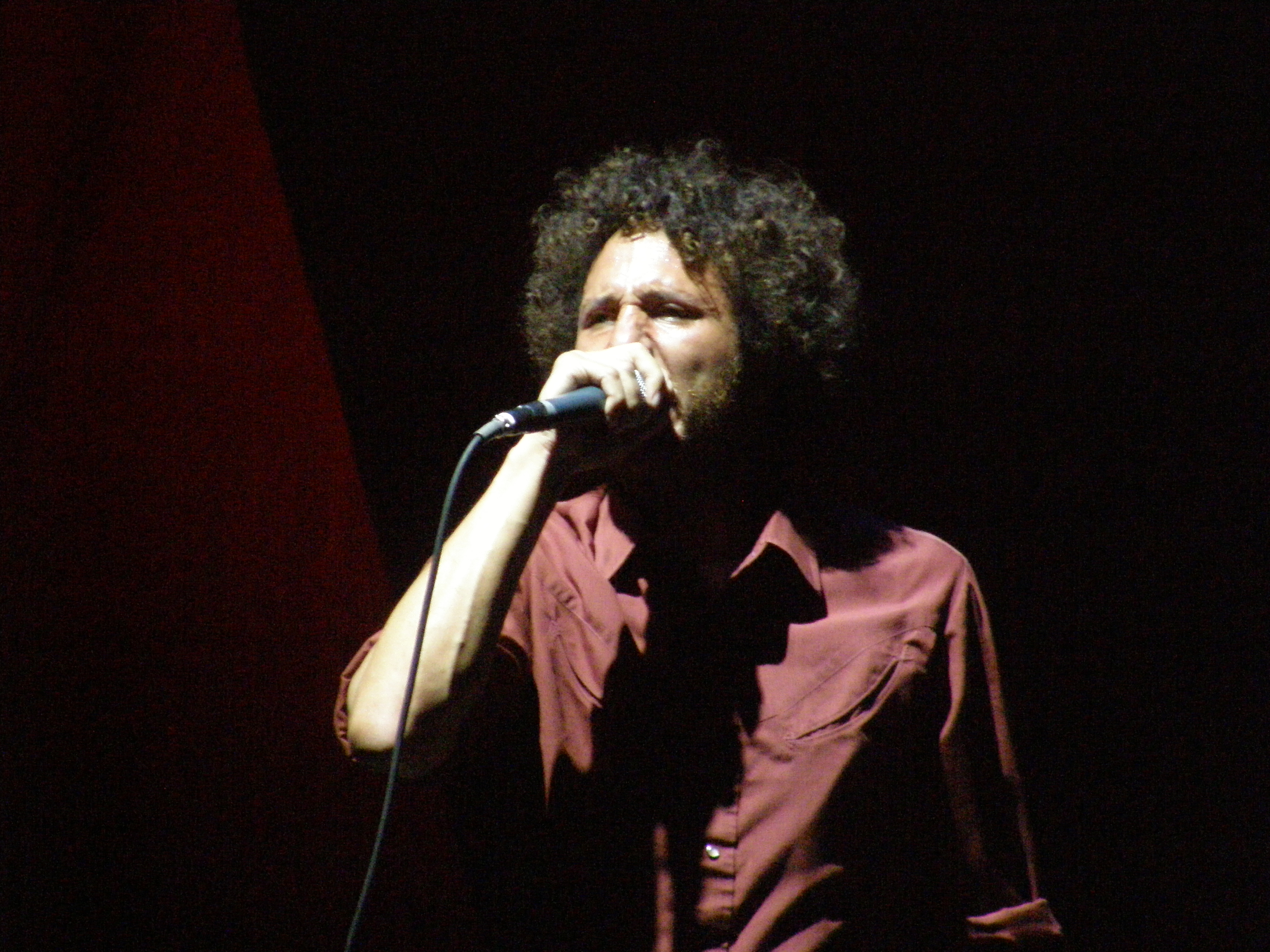
Vocalist Zack de la Rocha performing with Rage Against the Machine in 2007

=== EP lineup ===
- Zack de la Rocha – vocals (Rage Against the Machine, Hardstance, One Day as a Lion, Farside)
- Vic DiCara – guitar (Shelter, Beyond, Burn, 108)
- Mark Hayworth – bass (Hardstance, Gorilla Biscuits)
- Chris Bratton – drums (Drive Like Jehu, Justice League, No For An Answer, Chain of Strength, Statue, Wool)

=== Previous ===
- Rob Haworth – guitar (Hardstance, Farside)
- Alex Barreto – drums (Against the Wall, Chain of Strength, Hardstance, Statue, World's Fastest Car, Ignite, Alien Ant Farm)
- Sterling Wilson – bass (Reason to Believe, No For An Answer)
- Mike Down – guitar (Amenity, Forced Down)
- Joey Piro – drums (Pitchfork, Forced Down)
- Michael Rosas – guitar (Headfirst, Smile)

== Discography ==
- No Spiritual Surrender – EP, (1990)
