= Burn (band) =

American hardcore band

- Origin: New York, United States
- Genres: Hardcore punk
- Years active: 1989–present
- Labels: Revelation, Equal Vision, Bridge 9, Deathwish
- Members: Chaka Malik; Gavin Van Vlack; Tyler Krupsky; Abbas Muhammad
- Past members: Vic DiCara; Manny Carrero; Alan Cage; Alex Napack; Durijah Lang

Burn is an American hardcore punk band formed in 1989. After releasing four EPs across three decades, Burn released its first full-length album Do or Die through Deathwish Inc. in 2017.

== History ==
Burn released its first recording, self-titled EP on Revelation Records in 1990. In 1992, the band separated, with vocalist Chaka Malik forming Orange 9mm, guitarist Gavin Van Vlack participating in Pry, Die 116, and The Big Collapse, and drummer Alan Cage in Quicksand and Seaweed. The band never officially disbanded, and after a stint of live performances, Burn was restarted with the addition of guitarist Vic DiCara (from 108 and Inside Out) and bassist Manny Carrero (from Glassjaw). In late 2001, Burn released a new EP on Equal Vision Records, Cleanse. In 2002, the band released a previously unreleased recording from 1992 on Revelation Records entitled, Last Great Sea, due to fans seeking out music which had been circulating among fans from a demo.

In April 2016 the band announced their fourth release, From the Ashes. With founding members Malik and Van Vlack, in addition to new members Tyler Krupsky and Abbas Muhammad, Burn released its first full-length album titled Do or Die on September 8, 2017, through Deathwish Inc. The album was produced by Kurt Ballou and mastered by Howie Weinberg.

== Members ==
=== Current ===
- Chaka Malik – vocals
- Gavin Van Vlack – guitar
- Tyler Krupsky – bass
- Abbas Muhammad – drums

=== Former ===
- Vic DiCara – guitar
- Manny Carrero – bass
- Alan Cage – drums
- Alex Napack – bass
- Durijah Lang – drums

== Discography ==
=== Studio albums ===
- Do or Die (2017, Deathwish)

=== Extended plays ===
- Burn (1990, Revelation)
- Cleanse (2001, Equal Vision)
- Last Great Sea (2002, Revelation)
- From the Ashes (2016, Bridge 9)
