= Krishnacore =

Hardcore punk subgenre

Krishnacore is a subgenre of hardcore punk that draws inspiration from the International Society for Krishna Consciousness (ISKCON), commonly known as the Hare Krishna Movement. Although some hardcore punk bands had already made references to the movement in the 1980s, the subgenre was established in the early 1990s by the bands Shelter and 108. The name is a portmanteau of "Krishna" and "hardcore".

Krishnacore has been described as "a subculture of a subculture of a subculture." The subgenre has been met with surprise by some observers, due to the seeming contradictions between punk rock and the tenets of "Krishna consciousness" espoused by ISKCON.

== Precedents (1980s) ==
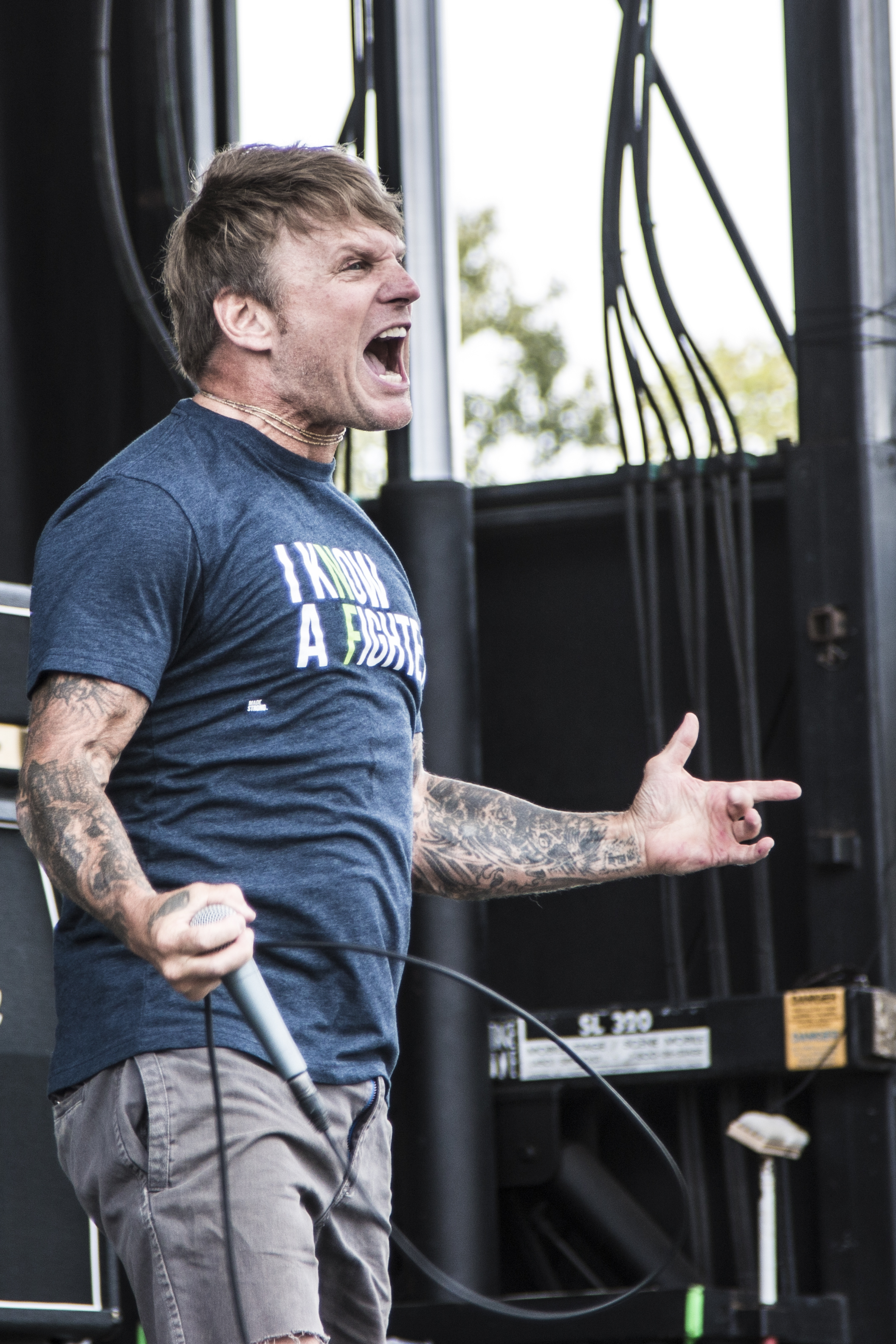
John Joseph of the Cro-Mags in 2015

Punk rock and Hinduism have converged occasionally since the early days of the genre. Singer Poly Styrene of the English band X-Ray Spex joined ISKCON following the breakup of her band in 1980. One of the first members of its scene to adopt Krishna consciousness was John Joseph of the Cro-Mags. New York bands Antidote and Cause for Alarm were among the first that began to explore Krishna consciousness in both their creative and personal lives, (Note: Both Antidote and Cause for Alarm released their debut recordings in 1983. In interviews, the frontmen of Antidote (Louie Rivera) and Cause for Alarm (Keith Burkhardt) both cite John Joseph of the Cro-Mags as the person who introduced them to Krishna Consciousness. Rivera said, "People lose track of what an influence that guy Johnny Joseph was at the time. He would be walking around trying to spread the word of the Bhagavad Gita and Krishna consciousness.") but the most prominent example was the Cro-Mags' debut album The Age of Quarrel (1986), whose title is a translation for the Hindu concept of Kali Yuga that is taught in Hare Krishna philosophy.

Music journalist Eric Caruncho has noted that the Filipino band The Wuds performed Krishna-influenced punk as early as 1986.

== Establishment ==
The band Shelter was formed in 1991, which is credited as the inventor of Krishnacore. Shelter consisted of two ex-members of Youth of Today, vocalist Ray Cappo and guitarist John Porcelly, who had become Krishna devotees.

In contrast to the typical anti-religious themes of punk bands at the time, religion was one of the main themes of Krishnacore lyrics. Bands often took inspiration from Vaishnava texts, such as the Puranas, Upanishads, Bhagavad-gita, and the Srimad-Bhagavatam. The anti-religious themes of typical punk bands reflect a broader attitude of rebelling against authority, and the religiousness of Krishnacore can be seen as rebelling against punk itself. In this way, Krishnacore can be considered to exhibit the punk attitude of rebellion, not in spite of, but because of its differences to typical punk culture.

The genre is also strongly associated with Equal Vision Records, which was formed by Shelter members to promote the Krishna movement. Other early acts within the genre include 108, Refuse to Fall and Prema.

== Characteristics ==
Although the Hare Krishna movement and many straight edgers shared the principles of refraining from drug use, vegetarianism and condemnation of illicit sex, the former also provided a transcendental and philosophical framework wherein lay these commitments. Scholar Mike Dines suggests that Krishnacore bands were conscious of their own history and aesthetic. He highlights "the importance of the devotional doctrine of bhakti-yoga within [the relationship between straight edge and the Hare Krishna movement]; a doctrine that was to inform further the move from straightedge punk to Hare Krishna monk."

Dines also discusses the spiritual meaning of sound in Hinduism, and in particular, Vaishnavism. Brahmanas believed that repeated recitations of certain texts could have a profound effect on someone's character, and that sound can have a divine meaning. Vaishnavas believe that there is no difference between the name of Krishna and the deity himself. This is in contrast to the "material" conception of the name of Krishna, which states that there is a separation between the name and the deity it refers to. Dines calls the recitation of the holy name "transcendental vibration," which Vaishnavas believe originates from the spiritual world itself.

Krishnacore is very different from traditional Hindu prayer music. The former's aggressive and abrasive style is in stark contrast to the latter's peaceful sound, designed to facilitate prayer and meditation. They are also played with different instruments. And yet, in spite of these differences, the concept of transcendental vibration and the fact that band members themselves believed in it helps grant validity to Krishnacore. In particular, Dines brings together rasa and the idea of Nada-Brahma to highlight the "unique fusion of Western popular music and the Eastern-based Indian spirituality (and lifestyle) of the Vaishnavas." In turning the punk aesthetic towards the devotional and, in particular, the transcendental vibration of the holy name, Krishnacore became a site of expression for bhakti-yoga. Moreover, Dines states "what provides validity to the connecting of Krishnacore and Indian aesthetics lies in the placement of those band members and associates who were involved in the scene." He concludes, "Ray Cappo, Robert Fish and Vic DiCara were not mere spectators of the Hare Krishna movement, but were indeed devotees themselves, reading and studying scripture, attending lectures and practicing the lifestyle of the devotee."

The difference between Krishnacore and bands such as Cro-Mags or Cause for Alarm, which previously made some connections between the Hare Krishna movement and the hardcore scene, was that the service to Krishna had become the sole objective of Krishnacore.

== See also ==
- Hindu music
- Hardline (subculture)
