= Vic DiCara =

American Krishnacore musician

- Genre: Krishnacore
- Instruments: Guitar; bass; vocals
- Years active: 1988–present
- Labels: Revelation; Combined Effort; Equal Vision; Lost & Found; Deathwish Inc.
- Member of: 108
- Formerly of: Beyond; Inside Out; Shelter; Burn
- Website: vicdicara.com

Vic DiCara is an American Krishnacore guitarist, vocalist, and bassist. He has played in the bands Beyond, Inside Out, Shelter, and Burn, and he is a member of 108. He is noted for incorporating Hindu spirituality into his music.

== Discography ==
=== with Beyond ===
- No Longer at Ease (1989)

=== with Inside Out ===
- No Spiritual Surrender (1990)

=== with Shelter ===
- Quest for Certainty (1992)

=== with Burn ===
- Cleanse (2001)

=== with 108 ===
- Holyname (1994)
- Songs of Separation 1995 (Equal Vision Records)
- N.Y.H.C. Documentary Soundtrack (1996)
- Threefold Misery (1996)
- One Path for Me Through Destiny (1997)
- Creation. Sustenance. Destruction. (2006)
- Oneoeight Demo (2006)
- A New Beat from a Dead Heart (2007)
- 18.61 (2010)
