= Daniel O'Mahony (disambiguation) =

Daniel O'Mahony may refer to:

- Daniel O'Mahony (born 1973), half-British half-Irish author,
- Daniel O'Mahony (Gaelic footballer) (born 2000), Irish Gaelic footballer
- Daniel O'Mahony (general) (died 1714), Irish army officer
- Danno O'Mahony (1912–1950), Irish professional wrestler
- Dan O'Mahony (born 1967), American musician, writer, and political activist
