= Shakti =

Divine feminine energy in Hinduism

Portrait of a traditional Hindu Goddess. The Hindu goddess is considered a visible personification of the intangible Shakti. (Note: The Hindu goddesses are distinguished by their elaborate ornamentation. Necklaces, ear rings, finger rings, toe rings, anklets, and bangles adorn the goddess. A bindi is put on the forehead between the eyebrows, considered the seat of ajna chakra, the command center of the self. Here, the three main nadis, arising in the body, passing through the nasal region (ida from left, pingala from right, sushumna through centre) converge. The pathway junctions of these nadis in the nose are pierced with a nose stud and rings. Yogis hold these three nadis as the most important amongst the thousands through which the divine feminine energy courses in a human body, producing sensations of subtle electric current, enables bodily functions and consciousness.)

Shakti (Note: Devanagari: शक्ति, IAST: Śakti; lit. 'energy, ability, strength, effort, power, might, capability') in Hinduism, is the divine feminine energy. The numerous Hindu goddesses are considered personifications of Shakti, with each goddess (Devi) representing a certain aspect of her infinite nature.

The origins of Shakti concept lie in the early Goddess worship traditions in the Indian subcontinent. While archaeological excavations suggest that goddess worship cultures prevailed for thousands of years before the Vedic period (c. 1500 – c. 500 BCE), it was in the Vedic era that the ideas which would later evolve to form a definite goddess theology appeared. The Vedas, the Puranas, and the Tantras form the primary textual sources in the study of Shakti.

The beliefs regarding Shakti are varied. In the Hindu pantheon, Shakti is personified as the wife of a particular deity, especially Shiva, for whom Shakti took many forms – "Uma, Durga, the terrifying Kali, and the motherly Parvati". Similarly, corresponding with Vishnu, she is Lakshmi. Likewise, in Hindu custom, the wife of a man is his Shakti. In the Ramayana, Sita, the wife of Rama, was his Shakti; in the Mahabharata, Draupadi was the Shakti of the Pandavas. Essentially, Shakti is the spiritual complement of the material nature, reflected in Shiva-Shakti symbology, where Shiva represents the material aspect. In the nondualist Hindu thought Shiva-Shakti is seen as a single inseparable unit being, indicating matter and spirit are essentially one, while the dualists differ holding them to be separate.

The idea of Shakti is interpreted in various schools of philosophy and psychology, and has an influence on sociological issues such as feminism, and Women's empowerment, apart from politics, literature and cinema. In India, Shakti forms the foundation of the Hindu goddess traditions, which now by the process of cultural diffusion, started to take root in the West.

== Overview ==
There is no word of wider content in any language than this Sanskrit term meaning 'Power'. For Śakti in the highest causal sense is God as Mother, and in another sense it is the universe which issues from Her Womb. And what is there which is neither the one nor the other?

— Sir John Woodroffe

=== Etymology ===
The word Śakti is derived from the Sanskrit root śak- ("to be able," "to have a certain capacity or power to do anything.") śak derives from the Proto-Indo-European root ḱek- ("to achieve, accomplish, be able, capable.") In Vedic literature, śakti is closely related to śacī, which is also derived from the same root śak, and is often used in instrumental plural and means "energy", "function" or "power".

According to the Monier-Williams dictionary, Shakti (Śakti) is the sanskrit feminine word-meaning "energy, ability, strength, effort, power, might, capability". Relatedly, Shakta (Sanskrit: शक्त, Śakta), is used for people and traditions associated with Shakti worship. Shakta became popular from the ninth-century onwards, before that the term Kula or Kaula, which referred to clans of female ancestry, besides to the menstrual and sexual fluids of females was used to describe the believers in Shakti.

=== Prologue ===
The dynamic narratives on the divine, along with the numerous Hindu deities can perplex new learners of Hinduism. Though some may regard it polytheistic, Hindu scriptures have presented the divine as being "both one and many", a view that made Hinduism accommodative of diverse religious thought. (Note: "The ancient Vedic dictum, Ekam sat vipra bahudha vadanti—That which exists is One: sages call it by various names—stands as one of the most profound and consequential statements in the history of religious thought. Originating from the Rig Veda (1.164.46), this aphorism encapsulates a sophisticated understanding of divine reality that is at once singular and manifold. It posits a fundamental unity of being, a single, ultimate truth that is perceived and described in a multiplicity of ways by enlightened seers. As Swami Vivekananda declared, this is a grand explanation, one that has given the theme to all subsequent thought in India and one that will be the theme of the whole world of religions.") From around 200 BCE, devotional movements in Hinduism started to group the numerous gods under a sovereign deity, two such common groupings were under Vishnu or Shiva, with the followers known as vaishnava and shaiva respectively. The followers of any of the Hindu goddesses honoured as the supreme goddess became shakta. Starting around 500 CE, Hindu Tantric religious cults developed among the shaiva sects, in the subsequent centuries Tantra developed amongst the sects of Vishnu, Goddesses, Buddha, and other obscure religious traditions. Goddesses and their associated traditions became prominent from the Tantric age.

The idea of God being female may appear radical, but goddesses form the foundation of the ancient Indian religious traditions. Hinduism has been cited by scholars of Religion as having the most extensive living Goddess traditions amongst all the extant religions. The concept of Shakti, as the supreme cosmic power that projects and sustains all existence, forms the basis of Hindu ideations of female deities. Much has been written to describe, define, and delineate Shakti, which, is primarily identified with the feminine and with the numerous Hindu goddesses, seen as tangible expressions-visible personifications of the intangible Shakti—a notion arrived at after centuries of deliberation.

In studying Indian religions and their associated philosophies, one finds terms in combination with Shakti, such as; adya Shakti (primal energy), cit Shakti (energy of consciousness), para Shakti (supreme energy) etc.—all of which, by their association with Shakti indicate that the respective concept is feminine. Though Shakti has broad implications, it mostly denotes "power or energy, which is feminine", and is also a name by which goddesses are referred. The term Shakti also covers maternal religious experiences and spiritual histories transmitted generationally by Hindu female elders.

== Origins and development ==
Archaeological excavations have been studied to trace the origins and development of goddess worship cultures. One of the earliest representation of a mother goddess dates back to the Upper Paleolithic period in Europe 20,000 years ago. Though goddess worship cults prevailed since antiquity in India, they gained popularity in the post Gupta era (6th century CE), much of it attributed to their esoteric practices. Apart from the Indian sculptures, the Vedas, the Puranas, and the Tantras constitute the major literary sources detailing the development of goddess culture in Hinduism.

=== Pre-Vedic goddess worship ===
The origins of Shakti concept are pre-Vedic. Sites related to the worship of the mother goddess or Shakti were found in Paleolithic context at the Son River valley, where a triangular stone known as the Baghor stone, estimated to have been created around 9,000–8,000 BCE was found. The excavation team, which included Kenoyer, considered it highly probable that the stone was associated with Shakti or the female principle. The representation of Shakti by a stone is an early example of yantra.

Scholars assume that goddess worship prevailed in the Indus Valley Civilisation (3300–1300 BCE) as many terracotta female figurines with smoke-blacked headgear, suggesting their use in rituals had been found in almost all the houses of Mohenjo-daro and Harappa. Numerous artefacts that appear to portray female deities were also found. These discoveries are however not inferred as the earliest indicators of goddess worship in India; they had evolved for a long period of time before.

=== In the Vedic era ===
The Veda Samhitas are the oldest scriptures that refer to various Hindu goddesses. The Rigveda and the Atharvaveda are the main sources about goddesses from the Vedic period (c. 1500 – c. 500 BCE). The most celebrated goddess was Ushas—the goddess of dawn. Though male deities like Indra and Agni have been more popular in the Vedic era, female deities existed as personifications of vital features such as, Earth (Prithvi), Mother of Gods (Aditi), Night (Ratri), and Speech (Vāc/Vāk). The male deities were developed as personifications of powerful natural forces, such as Vayu-god of air, Agni-god of fire, and they had powers, shaktis, or as it was then termed Śacīs as their core.

Śacī is the typical vedic term to denote a deities 'divine powers', and was used in the Rigveda mostly in connection with Indra. Most of the goddesses in the Vedic era were presented as wives of gods. They had no special powers nor an individual name either, but took their respective husband's name with feminine suffixes, as with Indrani, the wife of Indra. Though the vedic goddesses had no power, one Rigvedic hymn (10.159) addressed Indrani as Śacī Poulomī and presented her as the "deification" of Indra's power-an important precursor to the later development of conceiving Śakti as the divine power. The term Śacī here meant "the rendering of powerful or mighty help, assistance, aid, especially of the 'deeds of Indra'." This Rigvedic Śacī is a conscious intelligent faculty rather than a blind physical force, and was thought to be inherently constituted in a male deity. The subsequent usage of the word "Gnā" lit women, in the Rigveda for the divine female partners, who were distinctly separate principles of 'female energy' and acted in unison with the male gods, made possible the conception of Śakti as the divine power that exists independent of a male deity and something not inherent within them.

Eventually, in the Hindu texts, the idea of Shakti being the divine feminine energy became more pronounced as the wives, the gnās, the divine females accompanying the gods, began to personify the powers of their husbands. Despite arriving at this stage, it was only later, after a lot of philosophical speculation and understanding the connecting factor underlying the universe, that the idea of Shakti being the feminine unity that pervades all existence was developed.

==== Precursors to later conceptions of Shakti ====
In the Veda Brahmanas, all the different Gnās (wives of gods) were merged under a singular goddess Vāc, regarded as the most typical gnā. The Devīsūkta in the Rigveda, addressed to the goddess Vāc, became the progenitor of subsequent goddess theology. Here, (10.125), the Rishis conceived Vāc as "the active power of Brahman proceeding from him"; Verses 1 and 2 presented her as the "Supreme Female Energy" sustaining and stimulating actions of the Vedic gods; in verses 3 and 8, she is considered "Speech" in the feminine form; Verse 4 states, she is the "one great sustaining principle" of all life on earth; verses 5 to 8 assert her as the "subtle ubiquitous principle of energy" that pervades all.

Goddess Vāc

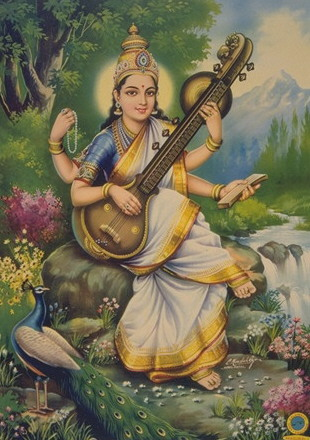
Goddess Saraswati

Vāc Devi was the chief goddess in Vedic times, Goddess Saraswati later became her embodiment

Prominent characteristics of Vāc were subsequently incorporated into the identity of Saraswati, a minor river goddess in the Vedas, but who later became the goddess of knowledge and the "Mother of the Vedas". The river Saraswati was worshiped as her waters were believed to provision spirit of fertility along her banks which had abundant crop cultivation. An epithet used for Saraswati in the Rigveda was "Ambitamā" or 'most motherly'. This was one of the earliest conception of motherly nature of female divinity and was later developed fully among the Shakta sects in the Puranic and the Tantric eras.

==== Late Vedic-Upanishad era ====
The Upanishads did not feature goddesses notably. However, the ideas devised during this era became significant in later conceptions of Shakti. The theory of Shakti advocated in Shakta Upanishads was predicated on the upanishadic idea of Brahman, a gender-neutral Absolute, considered God, whose nature is all-encompassing. The all-pervasive nature of Brahman gave rise to the belief that both human and divine, are in essence similar. This led to the concept of a connecting factor between the absolute and human — called Atman. At this time, there was no emphasis on the divine feminine, as Brahman is neither male or female.

The initial Upanishads postulated a transcendental Absolute—it cannot be depicted or understood, but be known only through Jñāna (insight, intuition). In the subsequent Upanishads an idea of Saguna Brahman (manifest absolute) was given, thereby making it accessible as deity. In the Shvetashvatara Upanishad, the impersonal Brahman becomes personal god, portrayed as "manifest Lord or Īśvara", thus enabling a "theistic relationship" between deity and devotee. The Vedic ideations on Vāc reached their fulfillment in the Shvetashvatara. Here the 'Supreme Śakti' is associated with Ishvara as being his own, but not as a fully separate principle.

=== During the classical period ===
The complete identification of goddess with Shakti was not fully realised until the classical period of Hinduism (c. 200 BCE to 1200 CE). This period saw the epics Ramayana and Mahabharata, including the Bhagavad Gita. These were largely complemented by Puranas, a body of literature built upon the ideas of Upanishads, but primarily made up of myth and legend proclaiming supremacy of a particular deity and equating their nirguna (unmanifest) state with Brahman. Most Puranas were dedicated to male deities, particularly Vishnu and Shiva, later Shakta puranas were allotted to goddess. Shakti worship that receded in the Vedic period became prominent from late classical period (ca. 600 CE) onward during which she was personified as Devi (Goddess).

==== Development in the Puranas ====
In the Puranas, the goddesses were presented as consorts of the gods, and came to be associated with their powers, thereby establishing a connection between female divinity and creative power. In the Kurma Purana (1.1.30) the goddess Lakshmi is portrayed being secondary to her husband, the god Vishnu, who "takes possession" of her when she appears at the churning of milk. Nevertheless, the Kurma Purana (1.1.34) described Lakshmi as the impetus of Vishnu, who says she is "that great Śakti (potency) of my form". The Pauranic goddess, projected as an embodiment of śakti along with "prakṛti (primordial or primary matter) and māyā (illusion)", is viewed as the source behind creation. She was, nonetheless, a personification of her consort's energy, and is called prakṛti, which is still subordinate to her consort's will. While a goddess was named śakti, the term essentially referred to a quality held by both male and female deities. An apparent equivalence between feminine divinity and cosmic energy was so far not vouched.

=== Development of metaphysical Shakti ===
==== Textual basis ====
The perception of divine feminine was radically altered by two texts: the earlier Devi Mahatmya and the later Devi Bhagavata Purana. The Devi Mahatmya, initially part of the Markandeya Purana, is the most prominent goddess-centric text to clarify the concept of an all-encompassing goddess or the Mahadevi (great goddess). By explaining her martial role, the text deduced her as the "ultimate reality". When the asuras (demons) endangered the existence of the devas (gods), the gods created an all-powerful goddess from their collective anger (Devi Mahatmya 2.9–12) by channelling their essential powers, which took the form of a feminine being-assented as the Mahadevi, the supreme goddess wholly independent of the gods and deemed the embodiment of śakti with additional powers of her own. Here, when the goddess finishes her work, she doesn't return to her source, the gods, but instead vanishes. (Note: "Unlike the Devi Mahatmya account, which makes their collective emanative activity appear as a spontaneous response to universal danger, the Devibhagavata Purana renders an explicit account of this devigenetic phenomenon as a purposive creation: "Viṣṇu ... spoke smiling 'we fought before; but this Asura Mahisa could not at that time be killed. Hence if some beautiful female Deity be now created out of the collected energy and form of the Saktis of each of the Devas, then that Lady would be able easily to destroy that Demon by sheer force.'" Although the account of her effulgent creation is not radically different in either text in a comparative sense, the Devi Mahatmya’s version of the anthropomorphization of the "Lady Deity" seems to capture the imagination quite vividly: "The gods beheld the mass of intense energy there like a mountain, pervading the other regions of the sky with its blaze; and that unparalleled energy borne of the bodies of all the gods which pervaded the three worlds with its light, gathering into one became a female ... the auspicious goddess."")

==== Ideation of her form ====
The Devi Mahatmya bolstered Mahadevi or the great goddess with numerous epithets. Besides the term Devi, the most general name for the goddess is Chandi or Caṇḍikā (meaning "violent and impetuous one"), this being the first mention of the term in a Sanskrit text and one probably conceived for this distinct incarnation, represented in an aggressive and often unorthodox mode with an affinity for drink and approval of blood offerings. She, as Chandika, is declared to exist eternally, and is lauded for being the foundation of the universe as well as for maintaining and protecting this world. The traditional creator-god, Brahma, extols her as "thou who containest the world," thus suggesting a panentheistic imagery for her being as the eternal world-soul that resides in everything, and is the queen of the universe.

The Vedantic-Upanishadic perception of the goddess as either the wife of, or the Para-Brahman, was always accompanied by a morphic vision of her form as the macranthropic feminine encapsulating all existence. The Devi Mahatmya (1.47) describes the goddess as "eternal, having as her form the world. By her is all pervaded". In deliberations over her form with respect to male divinities, the Devi Mahatmya is filled with duality-nonduality tension, (Note: "The goddess, it seems, even in this textual mythic magnification, is not yet elevated radically beyond male divinities who have lingered, some old, some originally latent (e.g., Viṣṇu), well into the time of the epics and puranas. For in the Devi-Mahatmya she is still "the perfect form of the powers of countless Devas." Nonetheless, the goddess is portrayed in paradoxical relation to such powers.") whereas the Kalika Purana provides erotic duality-in-unity framework. (Note: "[I]n its application of the principle of duality-in-unity, the Śākta anthropology understands man to be a theophany of the goddess as incarnate consciousness. Man, however, is a being of identical reality with the goddess, but only as a potentially liberated consciousness. The phenomenon of Śākta worship is in large part his soteriological endeavor to elevate his (ordinary) consciousness to the level of a supraconscious awareness of being: in, with, and as the goddess.") Eventually, Saundarya Lahari, considered the text where the goddess truly came into her own, presents a monistic vision of her as "an eternal ground of supraconscious being"; thus provisioning a cosmic anthropomorphic view of the ultimate reality. Existence is held whatever the goddess as the eternal form sees acceptable to her, thus establishing her power of sat and asat—being and non-being.

Ultimately, the goddess is believed to be beyond all form or appearance. Nonetheless, she is held in three fold: the supreme (para) being, which, as the Vishnu-Yamala tantra says, "none know(s)"; the second, subtle (sukshma) form which contains mantra; the next, for the sake of comprehension by man, gross (sthula) or physical form with face and body which the Puranas and Tantras cherish.

==== Character assessment ====
The idea of independence and not confirming to widely held notions of goddesses has been an intriguing trait of her character in the Devi Mahatmya. Here, the goddess primarily identified as Durga, is not dependent on a male consort and handles the male roles herself successfully. In battles, she fights without a male ally, and when needed aide, creates female peers from herself like Kali. Also, the ideation of the goddess as a personification of Shakti varies, instead of providing power to a male consort like other puranic era goddesses, here she takes powers from the gods–who all "surrender their potency to her" at the time of her manifestation.

The Devi Mahatmya elucidated the goddess very meticulously, clarifying the changeableness of her character and makes it evident that she cannot be characterized readily, as she is the embodiment of all facets of energy—being concurrently "creative, preservative and destructive" (Devi Mahatmya 1.56–58). The text explained the all-pervasive Mahadevi as being both devi (goddess) and asuri (demoness), for she represents positive as well as negative aspects of power. Here, the ultimate reality was completely equated with Devi, who is presented as the power enabling the trimurti—Vishnu, Shiva, and Brahma—to engage in the "preservation, dissolution and creation" of the universe respectively (Devi Mahatmya 1.59). The role of Devi, who appears at the time of cosmic crisis, is identical to Vishnu and his many avatars. As Vishnu vows to manifest himself at the time of crisis, Devi, also vows to manifest whenever she is required (Devi Mahatmya 12.36).

==== Brahminical synthesis ====
Scholars point that Devi Mahatmya exemplifies the notion of 'Brahminical synthesis' as postulated by Thomas J. Hopkins. Thomas B. Coburn explains it, stating that in the Devi Mahatmya, the pre-Aryan goddesses were gradually incorporated into the Aryan/Brahminical fold, all under the title Devi. The inclusion of pre-Aryan goddesses like Kali, Neeli, Sooli, Periyachi, Nagamma, etc., into the canon of Aryan/Brahminical goddesses (Parvati, Saraswathi, Lakshmi etc.), had consolidated the powerful, phallic potency of the transcendent mother from the proto-Dravidian civilizations, and made possible the emergence of a complex Hindu goddess or Devi with contradictory characteristics: being the primal matter or prakriti, as well as the transcendent spirit or Brahman; the consort of the Vedic gods, as well as the divine mother of pre-Aryan civilizations.

==== Scriptural fulfillment ====
The Devi Bhagavata Purana is the most exhaustive Shakta purana and forms the fulfillment of a textual credence in the Goddess tradition. The text was anthologized some five to ten centuries after the Devi Mahatmya, and contains a rendition of the later while being metaphysically more coherent. Presenting a shakta reply to the various androcentric puranic ideals, the Devi Bhagavata Purana includes the Devi Gita (forming skandha (book) 7, chapters 30–40), and is modeled after the Bhagavad Gita, but with a shakta outlook. The Devi Bhagavata Purana (3.30.28) consistently extols the Goddess as the "Eternal" and "Ever Constant Primordial Force"-the power behind all other deities, who is invariably presented as being "independent of any male authority and control". It is rather the gods who are completely subdued to the will of Devi, and are entirely dependent on her. In the Devi Bhagavata Purana, the workings of the universe appear way more related with Devi for she recourses to none but herself, whereas Vishnu and Shiva seek assistance of their respective Shaktis.

==== Identification with Brahman ====
The Devi Bhagavata Purana thoroughly identified Brahman with the Goddess-named here "Ādya or Primordial Śakti". (Note: "Shakta Upanishads and Shakta tantras equated Shakti, as the fabric underlying all existence, with the all-pervasive nature of Brahman, and held them as inseparable into two." According to V. R. Ramachandra Dikshitar, in Shakta theology: "Brahman is static Shakti and Shakti is dynamic Brahman.") She is unambiguously presented as the fount of all goddesses, from the highest to the lowest forms with the higher forms representing prominent aspects of her energy or power, who also conform with the three traits or the gunas in all life: "sattva (purity, goodness, the illuminating principle), rajas (activity, passion, the energetic principle) and tamas (darkness, inertia, dullness)". Corresponding with sattva, she is Maha-Lakshmi; with rajas, she is Maha-Saraswati; and with tamas, she is Maha-kali. Still, Devi is held as "being beyond all form", and is declared nirguna (not having gunas or unmanifest), thus making her incomprehensible. However, to liberate her devotees, Devi "becomes saguna (with gunas or manifest)" in a form that can be seen by the devotees. (Note: "After many (divine) years of being implored, the goddess, who is "the Highest Light of the Supreme Powers," appeared at once before them "in the form of an exceedingly beautiful Divine Woman"; "the Mother Goddess, the Incarnate of unpretended mercy . . . ready to offer Her Grace, the Mother of the Whole Universe." The gods state their collective requests, but not before they have been inspired to tears by her, "the Enchantress of All." Devi Bhagavata Purana 7,31.")

==== Reverence for Maya, Prakriti ====
The Devi Bhagavata Purana presents the concepts of Maya (illusive power) and Prakriti (material nature) in a more favourable manner. They are held as being a necessary factor in the creation process, and an intrinsic aspect of the goddess' power respectively. This is in contrast to the Hindu traditions of Advaita Vedanta and Samkhya philosophy, which view māyā and prakṛti with disdain. The nature of the goddess in the Devi Bhagavata Purana comprises both prakṛti and puruṣa (pure consciousness)-the dual realities of Samkhya philosophy. While in the Bhagavata Purana, Vishnu is the "controller and possessor of māyā", in the Devi Bhagavata Purana, the goddess apart from being the wielder of "the power of māyā, actually is māyā". The text quotes the goddess saying, "What is real can only be born.... Thus ... there does not arise any inconsistency in My being every-thing." (Note: Rita D. Sherma explains: "In Advaita Vedanta, for example, the world is said to be a product of māyā, both māyā and its result being ontologically dubious: neither real (for nothing is real but the Nirguna Brahman) nor totally unreal (for the world does have a provisional validity as the common experience of all who are not liberated). Māyā, in Tantra, on the other hand, is the fully real power of the Goddess to differentiate herself into the multiple forms of the fully real universe. In Tantra, reality has two aspects: the manifest world and self-existent, unmanifest potentiality. The universe is the embodiment of the Goddess and as such, not only real in an ontological sense, but a sacred hierophany. [A]s māyā-śakti, she becomes the necessary power of differentiation by which all contrasting forms and phenomena are created and the underlying unity is veiled.") In shakta cosmogonic view, Maya is the source of all natural phenomena and/or delusion, as well as the liberative milieu through which the goddess, "as Liberatrix", delivers man "from the ignorance of the forms which are of Her making."

=== Goddesses classifications ===
The many personified goddesses represent the closest accessible "visible expression of Śakti". (Note: "we are dealing with the inaccessible one who has chosen to become the many. Chandogya Upanishad 6.2.3.") The numerous Hindu goddesses are nominally categorized into two groups: "pan-Indian goddesses" and "local goddesses". The goddesses referred to as "pan-Indian" are known widely across India and are chiefly "Brahminical and consequently orthodox", though some of them tend to be unorthodox. They are generally distinguished by their finely honed mythologies, assurances from textual sources and are highly found in all types of Hindu temples, where they are represented anthropomorphically.

Of the numerous Hindu goddesses, Kali is the most famous as well as misunderstood

The most famous Hindu goddess happens to be Kali, who is frequently mistaken to be the goddess of death and destruction. Despite being associated with death and although having destructive qualities, Kali, represents a greater power exemplifying liberation and protection. Other popular Hindu goddess include Lakshmi, associated with prosperity and luck, and Saraswati, the goddess of knowledge. Lakshmi and Saraswati personify the benign (saumya) aspects of Shakti, in contrast to Kali and Durga, who personify the fierce (raudra) aspects of Shakti.

==== Divine ambivalence ====
The Devi Mahatmya consistently reaffirms the ambiguous nature of the Goddess. Two significant names for the goddess are Ambika ('mother dear' or 'good woman'), representing her auspicious and benign side; and Chandika (fierce, cruel, impetuous), representing her fierce and inauspicious side. She is also called mahadevi, mahasuri: 'the great goddess, the great demoness'. In much of Hindu thought, there is no concept of a singular benignant god or goddess and a distinct evil power. All the deities are facets of the one Brahman, the progenitor of everything, including both positive and negative aspects of life. However may the many goddesses appear on the outside, they are essentially embodiments of Shakti. In this context, the pan-Indian goddesses personify both the positive and negative, or benign and fierce aspects of Shakti.

There are goddesses who personify benign aspects of Shakti - "the power of devotion, wisdom, love or compassion, etc", and then there are goddesses who are described as "essentially fierce", they personify the more active powers of protection and destruction, and need their worshippers to confront their fears to receive the goddess's grace. A significant fact to be remembered here is that the "goddesses are essentially benign and essentially fierce". Those goddesses who are benign are not completely so, as they may have a fierce side to their personalities. Similarly, the fierce goddesses may have a benign aspect to their characters. This dualistic nature of the goddesses emphasize the contradictory nature of divine power or any power or energy. Evidently, the power of fire, needed to sustain life, can and does decimate it. Likewise, the power responsible for creation is the same power that will destroy it regularly, or more accurately dematerialize life, transmuting it into unmanifest state again.

=== The benign side of Shakti ===
The infinite facets of the divine feminine's nature is discernible by the many perspectives on her. The goddesses, regarded as essentially benign, award their devotees divine grace; these goddesses include Radha, the lover of Krishna; Sita, the wife of Rama; Saraswati, the goddess of knowledge and wisdom; Sri Lakshmi, the wife of Vishnu, and the goddess of luck and prosperity; and Parvati, the example of ultimate devotee and the wife of Shiva.

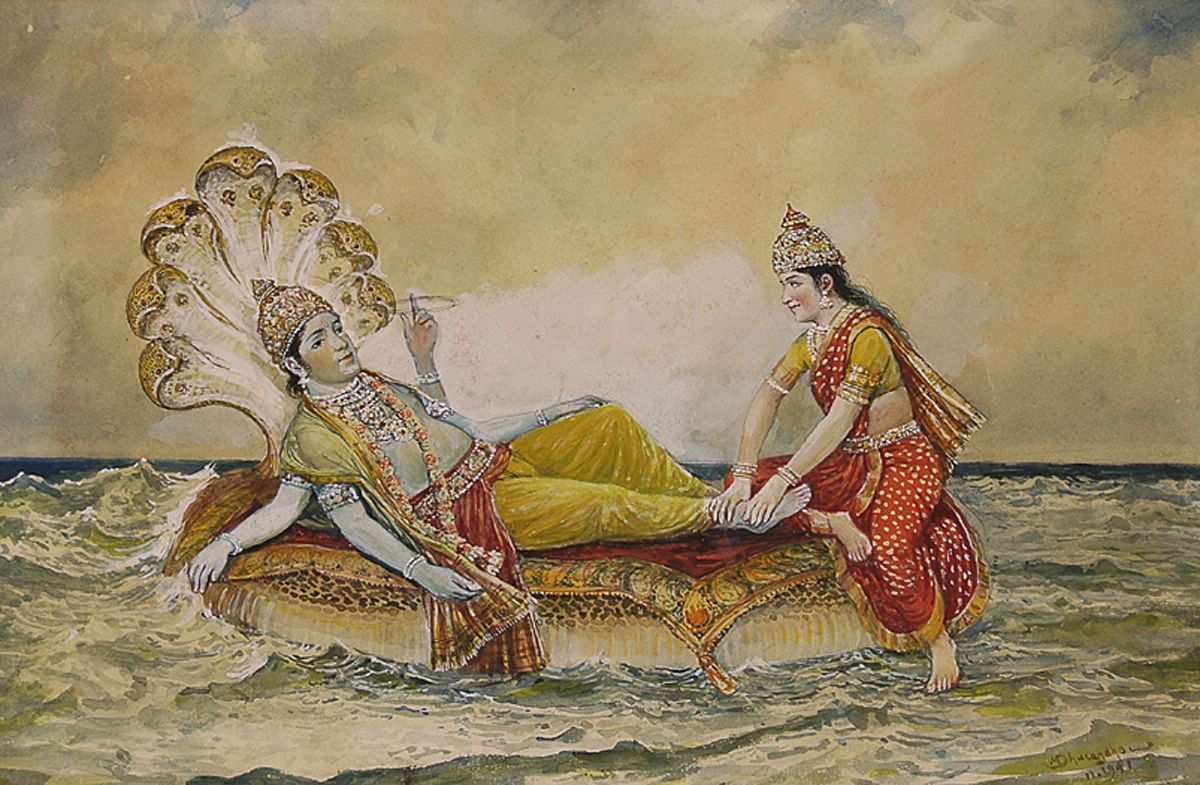
Goddess Lakshmi, often portrayed sitting at the feet of her husband Vishnu, typifies the benign (saumya) aspect of Shakti

The benign goddesses are highly beautiful and enchanting in their looks. They are very amiable and lure the devotee into having a "close and loving relationship with the divine". The essentially-benign goddesses reveal to the devotee their dharma (individual duties, responsibilities) in a benign way and help in their fulfillment by making them prevail over obstacles. Devotees who approach the benign goddesses need not be fearful, as above all, these goddesses provide "the power of love and grace".

The benign goddesses are mostly consorts of several gods, and in this respect, they symbolize the power of each of their husbands as his respective shakti. Each goddess is usually depicted as being smaller than her husband and is commonly shown in a subordinate role, as with Lakshmi, who is often portrayed sitting at the feet of Vishnu. In their roles as wives, the benign goddesses provide loyalty and assistance to their husbands, qualities that set ideal examples for Hindu women in general and often symbolize the supreme devotee.

=== The fierce side of Shakti ===
The more aggressive personifications of Shakti are represented by the essentially fierce goddesses such as Kali, Durga and Chandi. The character and imagery of these goddesses reflect the most profound understanding of the nature of cosmic power. The devotee is brought to face "the dark side of divinity" by these fierce goddesses, who appear to shatter all taboos. In numerous instances, the power of the benign goddesses is subtle, while that of the fierce goddesses is brazen and they seemingly delight in displaying their power. Though described as married, they are inherently independent and are undoubtedly powerful on their own accord. When depicted along with their husbands, the goddesses Kali and Tara are normally shown in the dominant position, often being involved in copulatory postures. Kali is the most glaring exemplar of this idealism as she is commonly depicted standing on the prostrated body of Shiva.

==== Goddess as divine warrior ====
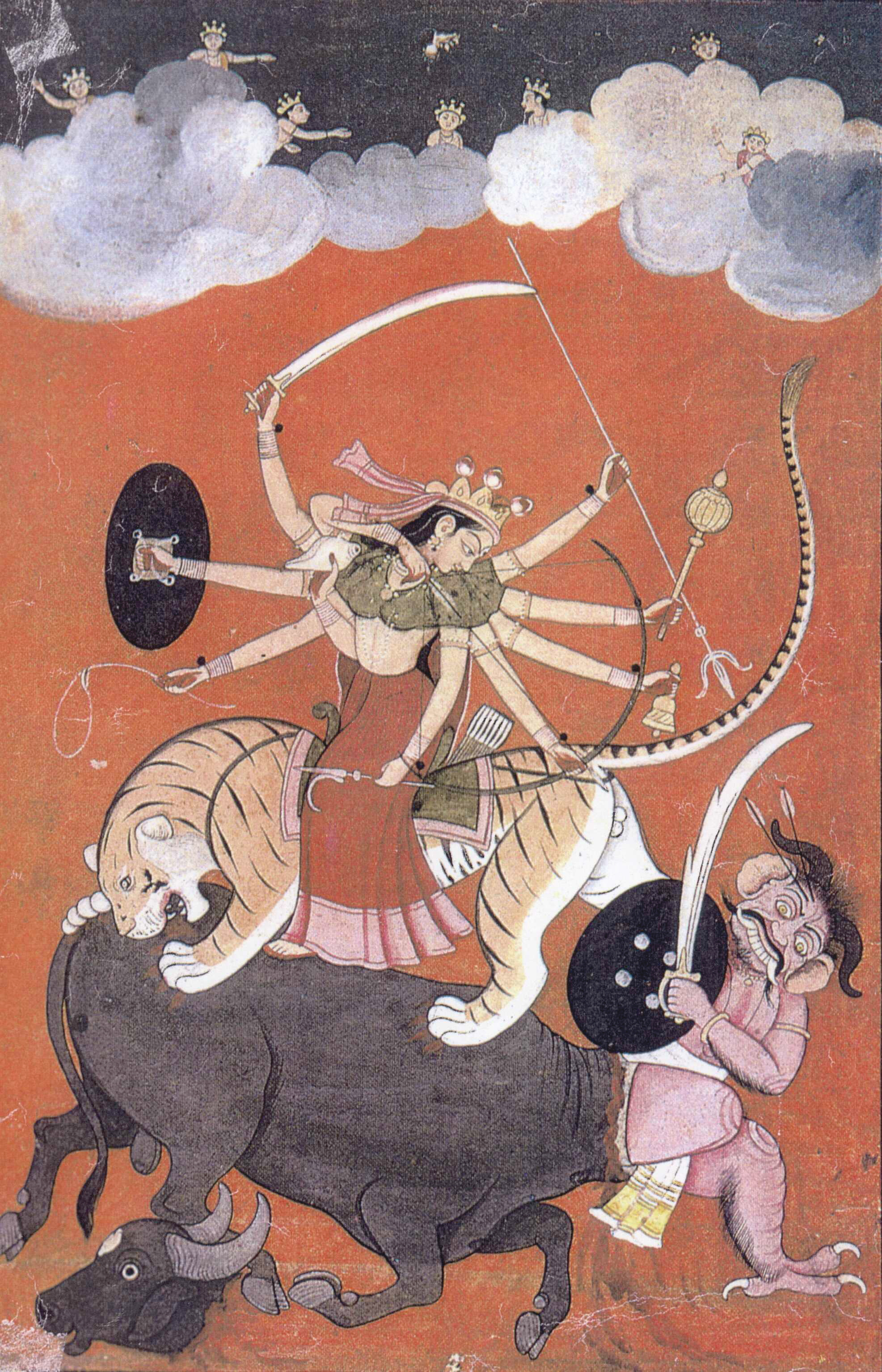
Goddess Durga

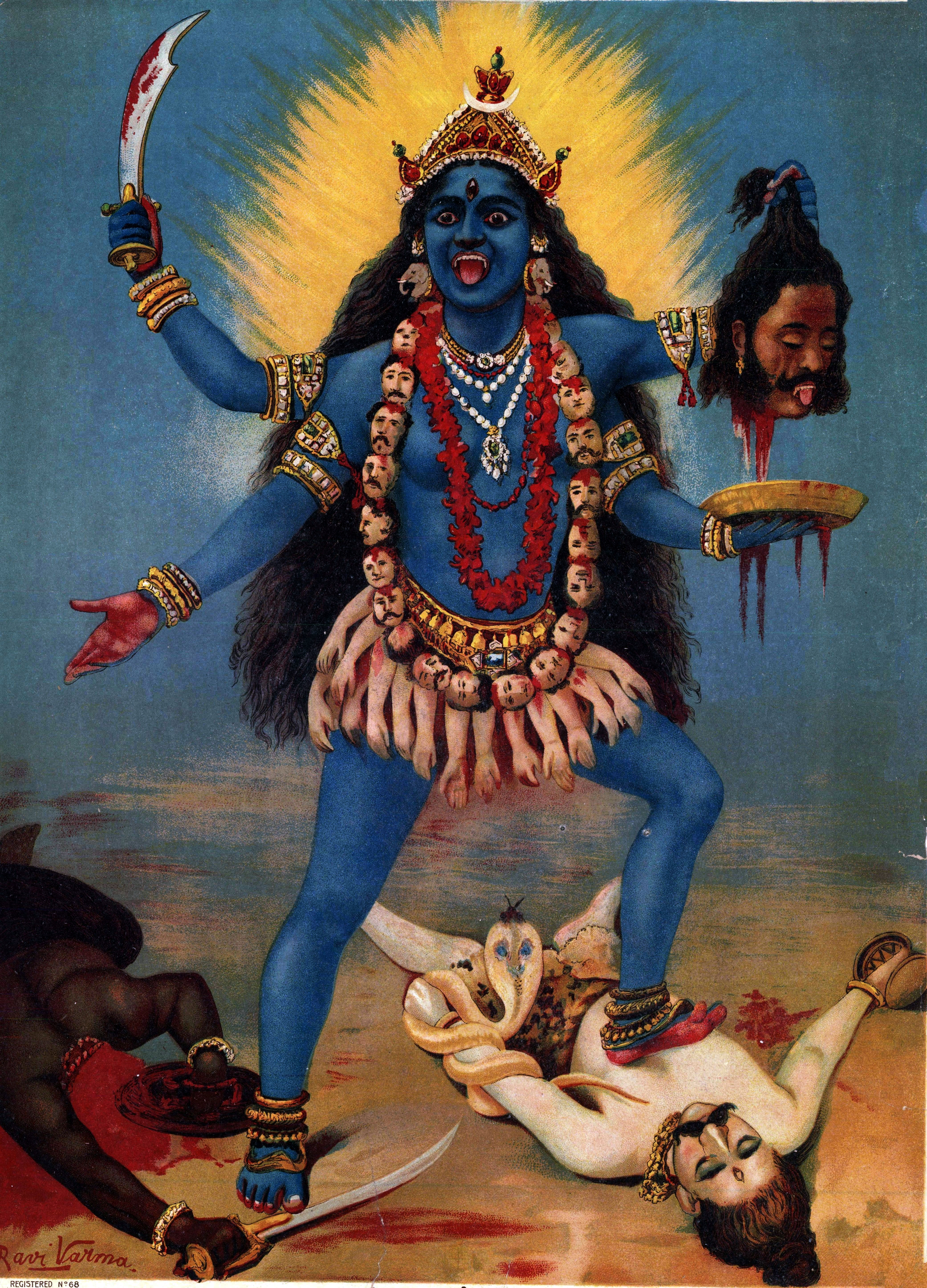
Goddess Kali

Durga and Kali represent the fierce (raudra) aspect of Shakti

The divine warrior trope is one of the most common themes in the portrayals of fierce goddesses, usually seen in representations of Durga. Here, the goddesses have protective functions and operate as destroyers of evil, commonly depicted as demon. By the Puranic era, the ontological polarization of the Universe, good/evil, was understood as the visible form of an eternal Daivāsuram conflict between the Asuras and the Devas. In this milieu, goddesses Durga-Kali are engaged in constant confrontation with the asura of the asuras, Mahishasura (buffalo demon). The depiction of a warrior goddess, shows the continuity and retelling of the vedic-brahminic-puranic Indra slaying Vritra episode (shruthi), only now with the characters transformed into Devi and Mahishasura. This development is seen as a testimony to both the remembrance (smriti) and the rediscovery of the essence of the earlier shruti.

Principally, goddesses Durga and Kali incorporate "the power of protection", and will protect anyone who comes to them with a spirit of humility or the attitude of a child. While Durga is seemingly in accord with the ideal of Brahmanical womanhood, being represented with an attractive face and many hands holding different weapons, Kali remains firmly on the outskirts of what is commonly considered as orthodox, on the borders of acceptability. The terrifying iconography of Kali—naked except for a garland of severed heads and a skirt of severed limbs, clasping a sword, holding a severed head, and standing on Shiva in a crematory—has made her a completely misunderstood figure. Accordingly, Kali is the "most grossly misrepresented Hindu goddess." In the West, she is depicted as the goddess of death and destruction, discarding her positive and elusive characteristics for her more dramatic qualities. Nevertheless, the sword of Kali destroys evil and cuts the worldly attachments that produce in man a keen sense of their self-importance.

=== Shakti embodiment by local goddesses ===
Borralamma Thalli

Bhadramma Thalli

Sattemma Thalli

The many female deities incorporating the regional cultural traditions of India are grouped as Local goddesses. Their names mostly end with an honorific referring them as Mother.

For the majority of people living in the many Indian villages and towns, more than the Hindu deities, it is the local deities, especially goddesses, who are of greater significance. Though many villages have shrines and festivals for the Brahmanical deities, they are often referred by different names, such as Sundaresvarar for Shiva in the South Indian state of Tamil Nadu. Also, the local people may attribute to the deities various qualities that can be uncommon in mainstream Hinduism. While goddesses such as Durga and Kali are forever engaged in fighting devils and in maintaining the cosmic order, it is the local goddesses who concern themselves with devotees' problems, such as finding jobs and spouses for the petitioners, protecting their caste groups and communicating the whereabouts of lost cattle. Local goddesses symbolize an outlook of Shakti based in the mundane or earthly aspects, and present an easily accessible "power source" for the people living in a particular location.

==== Local and pan-Indian goddesses relation ====
Local goddesses are generally not seen as local counterparts of pan-Indian goddesses. Though they are often regarded as having no connection with the Brahmanical goddesses or the concept of shakti, there is, still, a fundamental understanding that all goddesses personify divine power, and between all goddesses there is a correspondence. Per scriptures, both local and Brahmanical pan-Indian goddesses are Mahadevi manifestations. The idea that all goddesses emerge from one reality is expounded in the Brahma Vaivarta Purana and the Devi Bhagavata Purana, which states (9.1.58) 'Every female in every Universe is sprung from a part of Śrī Rādhā or part of a part'. The Kurma Purana, in praise of Parvati (1.12.64), emphasizes pan-Indian goddesses themselves have many manifestations; one of her epithet is "Ekānekavibhāgasthā, meaning 'stationed in one as well as in many divisions'." Such similitudes are speculated as genesis of the popular phrase 'all the mothers are one'.

The countryside of India is saturated with temples dedicated to Shakti. Om and Swastika are the holy symbols associated with the Hindu Goddess.

==== Consolidating local and pan-Indian goddesses ====
An interaction between the pan-Indian and local goddesses commonly occurs in the local areas where efforts can be made to "Brahmanise, Sanskritise or Hinduise" a local goddess. This approach involves shaping her character, similarly, to those of pan-Indian or Brahmanical deities, usually achieved by minimizing evidently local traits, such as approval of blood offerings. Another feature of this process is what has been called 'spousification', wherein an independent goddess is ritually married, either "temporarily, annually or – if fully Hinduised – permanently" to a celebrated god, usually Shiva. Again, conversely, the localisation of some pan-Indian goddesses took place, with them being conferred on with more popular names and forms and folklore that would relate them to a location.

The pan-Indian goddesses are clearly more orthodox and can be regarded as being essentially pure, they are paid respect to when needed and they stay at fringes of local life without necessarily intervening in the daily lives of people. Local goddesses, on the contrary, concern themselves with devotees' everyday issues which can most easily be addressed to the nearby goddess who would then solve the problem no matter how trivial. It can be asserted that local goddesses are of utmost importance in the daily functioning of Hindu life. The local deities and devotees lives are so inextricably interlaced that it seems they are in an intimate relationship.

=== Tantric realization of Shakti ===
The concept of Shakti as the all-pervasive divine power evolved with a long complex history incorporating various ideas in its development: from the Vedic belief of the male deities having female partners or aspects that acted as their creative powers; the upanishadic idea of a single powerful supreme divinity (which was not necessarily recognised as female); to the idea of an abstract energy immanent in creation. These ideas were interconnected to some extent by their speculation about the nature of Sound (Shabda Brahman) and its role in creation. Eventually, it was within Tantra that the idea of Shakti reached its fruition, here the "feminine principle (as Śakti—Śakti in goddess form)" was raised to the level of the Absolute. Shakti here is understood in two ways: as plural phenomena where the gods (including Śakti) are considered having Śaktis by which they act, and as a singular universal phenomenon where Shakti is the Goddess.

==== Shakti—the one Unit Existence ====
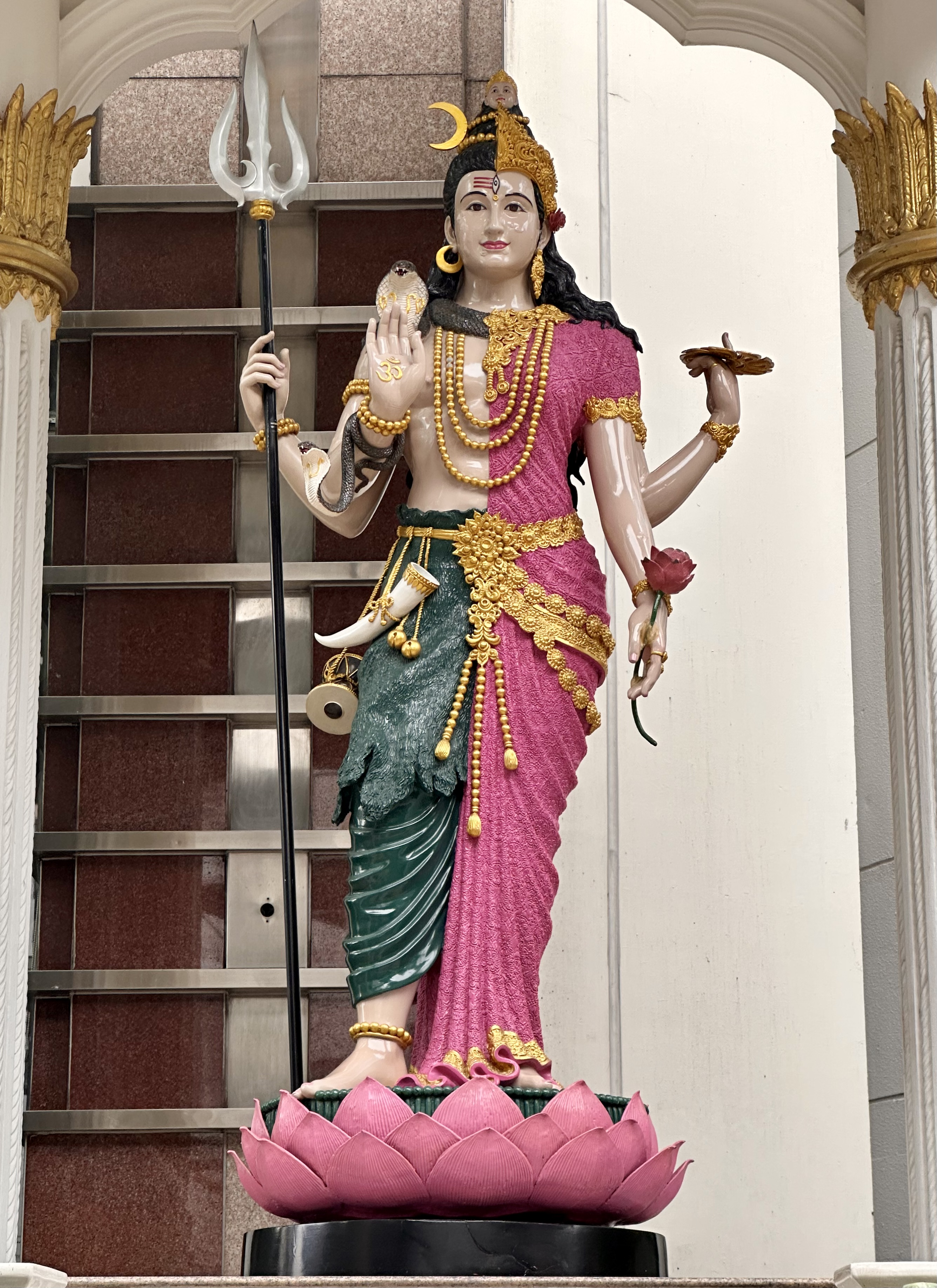
In Tantric theology, Shakti is the creative female pole of the inseparable bipolar pair Shiva-Shakti, which, ultimately forms the indivisible absolute Brahman.

In Devi Mahatmya, the goddess came to be identified with prakriti (materiality)—the feminine principle Hindus believe is the created world through which everything is made manifest. Initially developed in Samkhya philosophy, prakriti was posited against purusha (consciousness), with the two being eternally opposed forces behind the universe. This duality was resolved in the Tantras which view all existence as one whole inseparable from divine. (Note: "inseparability is the key word in Tantrism: inseparability of the absolute and the relative, of the divine and the human, and, by implication, of fact and expression." The goddess, then, is "the Absolute Spiritual Whole (Purna)," as much as she is also "the relative psychophysical whole (maya).") By identifying purusha with shiva and prakriti with shakti, the Tantras advocate nonduality of the two, asserting shiva and shakti are ultimately One and the same, thereby implying that "the divine essentially is creation"—thus making the goddess immanent in creation. (Note: "[T]he Indic tradition posits a primal duality of the feminine principle prakṛti (nature; materiality) and the masculine puruṣa (consciousness) in Sāṁkhya philosophy. Yoga grapples with the import of duality, while the tantric tradition resolves the duality of prakṛti and puruṣa, human and the divine, in an actualized nonduality where liberation or mokṣa entails a realization that the world is the body of the Goddess, and there is no ultimate distinction between body and spirit.") John Woodroffe states: the goddess "does not cease to be the cosmic cause because it evolves as the universe its effect." Shakti is the "creative dynamic energy" that permeates and animates all. In the Brihannila Tantra, the God Shiva says: "O Goddess I am the body (deha) and you are the conscious spirit within the body (dehin)". "Shiva without Shakti is but a corpse, it is said."

==== Theory of creation ====
Making redundant a classical problem of metaphysics that seeks to know how or why the imperturbable infinite One has become operative, Shakta ontology posits creation as an act of love between Shiva and Shakti, who join to produce the Bindu, the seed of the Universe. States Woodroffe, "the production of the Universe is according to the Śākta an act of love, illustrated by the so-called erotic imagery of the Śāstra. The Self loves itself whether before, or in creation. The thrill of human love, which continues the life of humanity is an infinitesimally small fragment of and faint reflection of the creative act". This sādhanic nature of love makes it possible for one to experience in the union of Śakti and Śākta—that, which is ultimately real, but remains incomprehensible at the level of critical thinking.

==== Kundalini Shakti ====
In Hindu tantric view, Shakti pervades the Universe and is present in an individual as Kundalini shakti. The latent spiritual consciousness and life force are manifestations of Kundalini shakti, which is imagined to be coiled and dormant in ones subtle body, at a location corresponding to the base of the spine in the gross or physical body. Tantric practices seek to awaken the Kundalini, which when fully awakened and ascendant, unites ones life force with the higher self resulting in self-realization. The metaphysics of Shiva-Shakti symbology asserts the presence of centers of consciousness called chakras (or lotuses) over length of the spinal cord, along which Kundalini Shakti that sits at bottom of the spinal column rises to meet Shiva at top. Piercing through the different chakras, the Kundalini either breaks obstructions or awakens powers associated with the particular chakra. (Note: "The Yogic and Tantric Kundalini serpent power is a strong tradition of raising the image of the primordial serpent energy up the spine through the body’s chakras, from the lowest intestinal exit through to the highest cosmic release from the skull. The root Muladhara Chakra is about earthiness; the next up, the Svadhisthana Chakra, at the genitals, is about fire and sexuality; the Manipura Chakra, at the digestive tract, is about hunger and greed; the Anahata Chakra, at the heart, is about love and imagination; the Vishuddha Chakra, at throat level, is about mystical insight; the Ajna Chakra, between the eyes, is about higher consciousness; and the Sahasrara Chakra, at the crown of the head, is the focus of release into cosmic oneness, where all oppositions and forms melt into ultimate reality, the ground of all Being.") The resultant fusion of Shiva and Shakti in an individual is a continuous process of ones transformation—bringing in greater awareness of being, truth, and the realization of Shiva-Shakti-samarasa (the blissful embrace of Shiva and Shakti)—of the Unit existence (i.e. there can be no Shiva without Shakti and no Shakti without Shiva).

==== Worship and salvation ====
Traditional practice of worshipping the goddess consists offering flowers and fruit to an external image of her. A Tantric devotee, however, engages in intense meditation, mentally build an image of the goddess and worship her by reciting sacred sound or spell (vidyā), usually silently. This Tantric visualization process involves complex techniques to enter altered state of consciousness, and may offer the devotee extraordinary visions of the goddess.

Ramakrishna, regarded as one of the greatest devotee of the Goddess, spoke of her in deeply personal terms, and expressed his relationship with her as a child to a mother. He mentioned two classic roles for the Devi worshipper — child, and handmaid or hero. Ramakrishna explained heroic attitude as trying to please the goddess with the same passion as a male has with a female during intercourse. According to Gavin Flood, in Tantrism, the Goddess manifests in all women in varying degrees, and in the left-handed path of erotic worship with their male partner (Shiva), they become the "door to the divine realm", ensuing liberation for both partners.

In classical Indian thought, Shakti is characterized as the divine principle in man, the creatrix of spiritual intuition and comprehension. Shakta anthropology holds man to be a theophany of the goddess as incarnate consciousness (Śāktiman). However, man's consciousness is in unliberated state, the worship of shakta is essentially an endeavour to elevate ones consciousness to that of the supraconscious being. Salvation then, in a shakta view, is not deterministic but evolutionary. A fundamentally important tantra, Jayadrathayāmala, elaborated Shakti by the vedantic way of neti neti, and stated that the only way for salvation is thus:

Manifesting in that expansive domain of reflexive awareness, she is that true nature that encompasses the true nature of each individual. She is it. It is she. That is exactly how she is. She is that consciousness which shines forth on its own by virtue of her supremacy over unconsciousness. ... She is infinite, and all of this is pervaded by her. She takes all forms, is present everywhere, is queen of everything, and is garlanded with everything. She is eternally near, not far away. That formless one is truly one’s own true nature. Knowing her, one attains liberation while alive. Any other way is useless. (Note: "To be sure, "liberation is gained only when Kuṇḍalī takes up Her permanent abode in the Sahasrāra, so that She only returns by the will of the Sādhaka" (John Woodroffe, The Serpent Power, 7th ed. [Madras, 1964], pp. 243-44, 250)." The Sahasrāra at the crown of the head is the culmination point of ascendent Kundalini, which takes place when the union of Shiva-Shakti happens in an individual's body, signifying liberation. A liberated soul is believed to leave the body after death through an opening in the skull called Brahmarandhra, which likely corresponds with Fontanelle that remains open at infancy but closes by adulthood. The opening of this spot is usually affected by the heat during cremation which splits the skull, if it doesn't, a long pole is used to nudge at this spot, the opening of which leads to release of the soul.)

==== Shakti as Shabda Brahman ====
Tantric theories of creation posit Shakti as Shabda Brahman (the ultimate reality as absolute sound), which engages in creation by a process of "phonic evolution (or sonic emanation)" from motionless causal sound. Agehananda Bharati suggests the use of words "manifestation' or "emanation" instead of "creation" as the idea of producing something out of nothing is absent in Indian thought. Accordingly, all of existence is said to be a transmuted expression of Shakti, who permeates it all as sound. In Hindu cosmogony view, Shakti informs all manifestation by the means of nada (sound vibrations); dispenses divine will, and manifests herself as subtle fields of resonance, through which she provisions divine power and delight by which existence is sustained.

In Tantra, all sound is eternally related to Shakti (she as absolute sound); Word(s) as mantra are deemed subtle manifestations of the Goddess and possess power to induce vibrations in the mental constitutions and vital atmosphere resulting in effects, actions and even material forms in the physical plane referred to as attainment of siddhis (magical powers). The development of mantra being considered as Shakti, of the archetypal Word (Vak or Logos) being regarded as a tangible expression of the spirit, is seen as reconciling the duality between spirit and matter.

==== Divergence in Hindu and Buddhist Tantrism ====
The term Śakti is used in both Hindu and Buddhist Tantrism to indicate the feminine aspect of a god. However, while Hinduism identifies shakti as a kind of feminine energy that is active and dynamic, Buddhist interpretation diverged diametrically opposite. In Hindu Tantrism, creation is seen as a result of the union of the active feminine (Śakti) and the passive masculine element (Śiva). Buddhist Tantrism views this creative movement as anathema in the path of approaching the undifferentiated state of sunyata. In Buddhism, Shakti is the power that creates maya (illusion), which it so deplores. Liberation from maya is sought by union with the female element (identified as Prajna), which is held as the non-active and static counterpart to the active and dynamic male element, referred to as Upaya, for it represents the Means to liberation. In Buddhist Tantrism, the feminine element of the divine is not active, but static, and is represented by a female figure in union with male element.

Anagarika Govinda states that the concept of Shakti forms the focus of interest in Hindu Tantras as the feminine divine power, but it does not play any role in Tantric Buddhism, where the central idea is Prajna. While Prajna refers to the non-active female element, the active female element is referred to as Dakini. Theological scholars, such as E. Dale Saunders, recommend that use of the term Shakti be restricted to Hindu tantrism as it represents concepts that are in direct opposition to Buddhist tantric doctrine.

== Beliefs and traditions ==
- Shakti is the universal power, the active energy and executrix of a given Hindu god. Though Brahma, Vishnu, and Shiva are associated with creation, preservation, and destruction, their tasks are performed by their respective shaktis. In the Hindu pantheon, Shakti is personified as the wife of a particular deity, especially Shiva, for whom Shakti took many forms – "Uma, Durga, the terrifying Kali, and the motherly Parvati". Similarly, corresponding with Vishnu, she is Lakshmi. Likewise, in Hindu custom, the wife of a man is his Shakti. In the Ramayana, Sita, the wife of Rama, was his Shakti; in the Mahabharata, Draupadi was the Shakti of the Pandavas. (Note: "Shakti (sakti) in Indian religion is the energizing material power of a given Hindu god, a power personified as his wife, especially the wife of Shiva. Often depicted in a state of sexual union, the god and his shakti together represent the Absolute, the god being nonactivated Eternity, the goddess being activated Time.")
- The Devi Bhagavata Purana says She is "Supreme, eternal and primordial... But she is imperceptible to the philosophers, gods and saints". Only Bhakti (loving devotion), to the depreciation of all other modes of pleasing, and her grace (anugraha) makes one perceive her. Per Tantra-shastras, whatever we perceive is a combination of the eternally formed (svarupa) and the eternally formless (arupa). Texts portray her as ultimately formless-contemplated intimately through iconic or aniconic forms. Animated and inanimated objects like rivers, stones, trees, mountains are worshipped as embodiments of shakti.

The Neem tree is worshipped as an embodiment of Shakti. Photos of a local goddess, Nookambika, and pan Indian goddess, Durga, are attached to the tree. Prasada or consecrated food is offered.

- The goddess is believed to be immanent in the world and especially visible in India, where natural sites such as rivers, caves, hills are venerated as sacred and are associated with the goddess as centres of Tantric power, called Shakti pithas ('seats' of her power) or Pithasthans. These are located across the Indian subcontinent, and are believed to be the sacred seats of Shakti. At the altars in these shrines, Shakti is often worshipped in the form of a stone, which is painted red, considered the colour of Shakti, and is decorated with anthropomorphic features like eyes.
- Worship in early shakta traditions centred on goddess and her yoni, which is believed to be the primordial origin of the cosmos. The yoni represented by an inverted triangle, with its three corners signifying—"will (iccha), Knowing (jnana), and activity (kriya)"—is the symbol of shakti. Synchronization of menstrual cycle a woman with the moon's lunar cycle is held important. Menstrual blood (Kula) is revered and is offered in rituals to propitiate deities. In some cases, Animal sacrifices have replaced menstrual blood offerings, however the female animals are not sacrificed.
- In Shakta traditions, Women are considered inherently divine owing to their common feminine nature with the Goddess. (Note: "In many of the tantra texts relevant to this tradition, one finds descriptions of women that honor and revere their female nature; for example: "Women are divinity, women are vital breath. Women are goddess, women are life. Be ever among women in thought." This is the nature of a Shakta. Contrary to the later Brahminic traditions’ immaterial conception of the universe as BRAHMAN, the Shakta views the divinity as both immanent and transcendent.") Realizing woman as shakti, as a "form of the formless form", an embodiment of existence-consciousness-bliss, through the discipline of yoga signifies a high level of consciousness in man. (Note: "The goddess is, moreover, specially and archetypically related to the female sex in essence and manifestation. "She is the Gem amongst women. ... Every female in every Universe is sprung from a part of Sri Radha or part of a part" (Devibhagavata Purana); that is, "the women of the world are descended from her. Insult to women is indignity to Nature (Prakrti, Goddess). (Brahmavaivarta Purana)") Swami Vivekananda remarked: "Do you know who is the real "Shakti-worshipper"? It is he who knows that God is the omnipresent force in the universe and sees in women the manifestation of that Force."
- Shaktas worship Goddesses with numerous names and forms, all of them believed to be different aspects or manifestations of the supreme Shakti herself. The Lalita Sahasranama, an important text in the Hindu goddess tradition, lists one-thousand names of the Goddess and elaborates her multifaceted nature. Yakshis, Grahanis, Matrikas, and Yoginis are associated with the threshold experiences of womanhood, such as childbirth, menstruation, sex, illness, and death.
Idols of various Hindu Goddesses adorn the four sides of a Shakta temple. The numerous Hindu goddesses are considered personifications of Shakti. Kali, the most famous Hindu goddess, is standing in the third row, third from right.
- Shakta texts present Saraswati, Lakshmi, Parvati as the three great goddesses (Tridevi) who are not dependent on or conditioned by anything else; with an "ineffable fourth", described being "boundless plentitude", the origin and devourest of all, inconceivable and who alone ultimately remains as the One, namely Kali, held as mother of time (Kālamāta) as well as destroyer of time (Kālaharshinī). Kālī-Śakti is the power behind all powers and very essence of ultimate reality.
- Texts such as Devi Bhagavata Purana, Kalika Purana, Markandeya Purana, and Mahabhagavata Purana acknowledge Shakti as the supreme. In the Shakta tantras, Shakti becomes parashakti, a state of her unmanifest repose. In the Markandeya Purana, Shakti is philosophically conceived as "pure consciousness" that manifests in the roles of mother, warrior, lover so forth to experience the "Lila" (divine play), which is of her own making.
- In the Smarta Hindu tradition, Shakti is one of the five major gods worshipped in the panchayatana puja (“five-shrines worship”), with the others being Shiva, Vishnu, Surya, and Ganesha.
- In Kashmir Shaivism traditions, Abhinavagupta ideated Shakti as the creative capacity of the god Shiva, who is characterized here as prakāśa (pure light, undifferentiated consciousness, forming basis of all existence). The creative capacity or Shakti of Shiva is understood to have a fivefold structure: "(a) cit-śakti or the power of creative consciousness; (b) ānanda-śakti, the power of bliss or joy; (c) icchā śakti, the power of will or desire; (d) Jñāna-śakti, the power of knowledge; and (e) kriyā-śakti, the power of action."
- The major Hindu festivals that worship Shakti include Dasara, Diwali, and Kali Puja. Celebrated annually in the fall season, they honor goddesses Durga, Lakshmi, and Kali respectively.
- At the annual Hindu festival of Attukal Pongala in India which sees the single highest congregation of women anywhere in the world, teeming in millions, the goddess is worshipped by the offering of pongala (porridge) to rejuvenate her Shakti. The goddess is believed to join the festivities here as one of the millions of women assembled.

== Philosophical and psychological perspectives ==
=== Shakti and Power: in the Indian and Western philosophical traditions ===
The debate over Power's existence spans different philosophical traditions, notably Indian and Western. In the Indian philosophical traditions, the concept of shakti (power/energy) is highly debated between the Nyaya and the Mimamsa schools of thought, and is central in the understanding of causality. Nyaya philosophers argue that causal efficacy is inherent in the very nature of the object (e.g., the capacity to burn is intrinsic to fire), making the postulation of a separate "power" redundant. The Mimamsakas, particularly the Prābhākara school, defend shakti as an independent, real entity (padārtha) that is distinct from the object yet inheres in it. They argue that shakti is the specific link that explains why a cause produces a specific effect, and without shakti, the relationship between cause and effect would be arbitrary. A critical argument against shakti by Naiyāyikas is that if a power is needed to explain an effect, another power would be needed to explain the first power, leading to an endless chain. This infinite regress is countered by concluding that saving the "root" (the fundamental power) prevents the regress from being vicious, thereby validating the existence of power as a foundational element of reality.

Within Western philosophy regarding the ontological status of powers, John Locke posits that powers are real, objective properties inherent in objects. For Locke, we infer these powers from their effects; for instance, fire has the power to melt wax, which is a real property of the fire, not just a mental habit of observing succession. This stands in direct opposition to David Hume, who dismissed "power" as a non-empirical metaphysical construct. Hume argued that we only observe constant conjunction (event A followed by event B) and that positing an intrinsic "power" connecting them is unnecessary.

A comparative study of Indian and Western philosophical thought on power by Amita Chatterjee revealed a convergence between Locke’s empirical realism and the Mimamsa defense of shakti. Both traditions argue that powers are indispensable for a coherent explanation of the material universe. Chatterjee refutes Hume by asserting that rejection of powers leads to an incomplete understanding of causality, as without admitting real powers, the causal structure of the material universe becomes inexplicable. Chatterjee assessed that power is ubiquitous, and the admittance of the existence of power is not a superstition, but is indispensable for explaining the material universe causally.

=== Shakti and Schopenhauer's Will ===
Arthur Schopenhauer was a German philosopher known for his metaphysical postulation of the concept of Will. According to Schopenhauer, the word Will — "like a magic spell, discloses to us the inmost being of everything in nature". The Will, states Schopenhauer, "is the inmost nature, the kernel of every particular thing, and also of the whole". It is "the force which germinates and vegetates in the plant, and indeed the force through which the crystal is formed"; it underlies all of the phenomenal existence, and appears in every "blind force" of nature (gravity), as well as in the "preconsidered action of man".

The Will as a thing-in-itself, enters into phenomenal existence—where it manifests itself; but it is considered to be free from all of the characteristics inherent in the phenomenal existence. However, objectively, the Will "determines our experience in all of its phenomenal aspects", thereby making itself eminently comprehendible. Schopenhauer states that when an individual becomes aware of the Will in their self-consciousness, they also become aware of the "consciousness of freedom" present therein. This leads one to believe a priori that they are perfectly free in their actions, but a posteriori, after experience, realize to their astonishment that they are not free and their actions were all subjected to necessity. This startling occurrence, Schopenhauer asserts is due to the fact that man "is not will as a thing-in-itself, but is a phenomenon of will", as such, one's actions are necessitated by principle of sufficient reason. However, man is free in a more basic sense, having "an unshakeable certainty that we are the doers of our deeds", this sense of responsibility reveals one's character, which in concurrence with motives and circumstances determine further actions, leading the individual to play out their designated role.

While Schopenhauer noted his philosophy has affinity with classical Indian thought and identified the notion of Brahman as its closest analogue; Heinrich Zimmer identified it with Shakti and wrote: Was Schopenhauer den 'Willen' nannte, heisst in Indien 'shakti', d.i. 'Kraft'. [sic] (lit. 'What Schopenhauer called 'Will' is called 'shakti' in India, that is to say, power'). According to Zimmer, Shakti is "the central concept of tantric ideology", and represents the essence of the world as divine energy. He noted that emergence of the idea of Shakti, ultimately, "puts an end to a prolonged, ancient struggle for preeminence and sole authority among the separate ways we conceive of the Divine". The many Hindu deities, countering their sectarian rivalries, were reduced to the "elemental concept they always had in common: to their very self, to divine energy". The countless personifications of Divine are held as manifestations of Shakti.

==== Resolution of Shakti and Will ====
Zimmer reflected that Shakti itself unfolds as the phenomenal existence—into which the "divine spiritual energy" enters, as part of a play, becomes divided therein and forms a duality of consciousness whilst unfolding through the many sentient and insensate objects, which are shakti herself; and realizes itself, above all, standing opposite to the insensate nature—in the "dimly lit spirituality of human consciousness", but becomes bound to it by its own maya, and remains oblivious of its transcendent nature as the "Universal One".

Though Zimmer's conceptualization of Shakti and Schopenhauer's Will intersect as universal, active forces—both bound to the Upanishadic vision of reality beyond appearances, they primarily differ in theological outlook. Zimmer emphasized Shakti as "the Divine", whereas Schopenhauer stripped the Will of any divinity altogether. Another significant aspect of divergence is around eros, Schopenhauer viewed the pleasurable eros to be the "unadulterated expression" of Will, from whose painful grasp freedom is realized only by its suppression in what he regarded as nirvana. Zimmer viewed the Tantras prevailing over such dualistic conceptions by their reduction into oneness—the dual creative polarities of pain and pleasure, masculine and feminine, represented by Shiva and Shakti, thus:

Everything in the world is Śiva and Śakti: in the sexual union of the spouses, the polar tension of the Divine's duality collapses into oneness; in this union, human consciousness crosses the borders of its isolation and enters a realm beyond polarities, to the point where it dissolves its polar nature—it becomes nir-dvandva. Eroticism in marriage is one means to the experiencing of one's own godlike nature, where the distinction between I and Thou, disappears, where the world falls away, where pain and desire and all the other polar opposites are transcended (aufgehoben).

An affinity between the Hindu tantric concept of Shakti and Schopenhauer's Will was perceived by Zimmer at a time when European academics disparged the Tantras as a degeneracy and corruption of medieval Indian culture and religion; but Zimmer, whose understanding of Shakti and Tantric thought was profoundly influenced by the works of John Woodroffe, viewed Tantras as reconciling the earlier disparities in Indian religious thought, and as thoroughly informative of Indian art and ritual.

=== Shakti and Analytical psychology ===
According to David A. Leeming, Shakti may well be regarded as the "spiritual equivalent of the Jungian anima (Latin for psyche or soul) in which the anima is the subconscious inner self of the male – his feminine principle". Relatedly, the animus corresponds with female, and the anima/animus complex can be regarded as the animating power of an individual similar to shakti for a god.

==== Tantric elucidation of Shiva-Shakti unity and Analytical psychology ====
Becoming aware of one's ‘true‘ self or the ‘deep‘ femininity entails the feeling of Shakti, which is considered to be powerfully present in sexuality. Psychologist Kathryn Madden says the notion of Self in Jungian psychology is analogous to the "Tantric notion of unity achieved through oneness with the divine feminine". In Tantra, the practice of mystical-erotic rituals seek to bring the male and the female principles, represented by Shiva and Shakti that appear seemingly opposite-arrive into unity or a harmonious whole in the "divine feminine" or "unified divine consciousness"—an idea analogous with the Analytical psychology's coincidentia oppositorum.

In Tantra, the male and the female principles, seemingly unequal, are brought into unity under the divine feminine by the ritual maithuna; an idea analogous with an unequal number of balls on a seesaw being brought into unity over a triangle

In Tantra, the purpose of sexual union is "realization of oneself and one’s partner as Shiva-Shakti". The guiding image of a male and a female conjoined in sexual intercourse represents the embodiment of non-dual awareness, and a couple would arrive at unity in the divine feminine by embodying nonduality (Shiva-Shakti), enabled by ritual maithuna, whereby the couple gets "completely dissolved in the unity of the godhead represented on the earthly plane by the energy field created by the synthesis of Shiva and Shakti in the couple." The synthesis of Shiva-Shakti in each of the persons involves rising of the latent Kundalini shakti ("active female energy") from the bottom of the spine and fuse with the "passive, male consciousness" (Shiva) at the top culminating in samadhi (contemplative rapture). The ensuing bliss experienced in sexual union is considered "the power of the goddess (Śakti) in a tangible form". Thus, the couple, in being sync with the space of the absolute Shiva-Shakti synergy field, perceives the "unity, totality, and infinitude" of their self. (Note: "The copulation of Shiva and Shakti represent the nondual nature of reality itself, and it is erotic energy, sometimes believed to be located in the concentrated substance of sexual fluids, that is imagined as flowing from the bottom of the spine to the top of the spine, where the erotic union between Shakti and Shiva occurs. This is especially the case in some tantric traditions, where techniques of erotic visualization or ritual copulation are used for the sake of stimulating and then sublimating energy toward higher states of knowledge, culminating in the realization of nonduality.")

The imaginal transformation of the couple in ritual maithuna also involves transmission of energy currents, by which "the goddess Shakti seeks to create an imprint or image in human form," states Madden, "The divine intentionally comes into a human form." This tantric phenomenon is analogous with the idea of Jungian individuation, wherein "the self of the psyche seeks us," to percolate higher consciousness. Both Tantrism and Jungian psychology stress upon temenos – body being a sacred container, and emphasize the accessibility of "the numinous and mystical in the physical and phenomenal realm". By clarifying analytical psychology, Tantra thus offers an insight into how the feminine consciousness and inclusion of the body can transform spiritual and psychological growth.

=== Psychoanalysis ===
==== Maternal figure ====
Shakti has been extensively interpreted in religious-anthropological texts. Hindu mythology features a central role for matriarchal power as seen in the powerful presence of the mother goddess, variously referred to as Devi, Parvati, Durga or Kali. The mother goddess is the embodiment of Shakti and the life-giving, generative power of the universe. Shakti symbolizes the idealized omnipotent mother. In the myth of Ganesha, Parvati alone creates her son from her own body or the earth in the absence of a father. This myth portrays Shakti as a combined parental figure opposing the triadic dynamic of mother-father-child, and represents the triumph of mother-son relationship over husband and wife.

In psychodynamic perspective, Shakti represents an "overwhelming conscious or unconscious feminine primal force or combined parental object". Sigmund Freud called Shakti "libido that cannot be simply repressed." In Indian religious life, Prapatti (surrender) to divine, comes from an overwhelming love of God. According to E. H. Rick Jarow, the primacy of son-mother dynamic over that of lover-lover dynamic in Indian culture, may render a male lover of the Goddess reflect an Incest taboo. (Note: "In the Śākta scheme of cosmogonical process, the unmanifested Prakṛti alone existed before creation. She wished to create, and having assumed the form of Great Mother, she created Brahmā, Viṣṇu and Śiva out of her own body. ... In her highest form she is Mahādevī, the consort of Śiva but, in spite of her being the consort of the latter, she is his creator. In Asia Minor and round the shores of the Mediterranean are found many examples of Mother Goddess with a young subordinate god by her side. In Punic Africa she is Tanit with her son; in Egypt, Isis with Horus; in Phoenicia, Ashtaroth with Tammuz (Adonis); in Asia Minor, Cybele with Attis; in Greece (and especially in the Greek Crete itself), Rhea with Young Zeus. Everywhere she is unwed, but made the mother first of her companion by immaculate conception, and then of the gods and of all life by the embrace of her own son. ... Such stories of Virgin Goddesses are relics of an age when the father had no significance at all") Psychoanalyst Julia Kristeva in her book Powers of Horror, argues that in resolving an individual's oedipus complex, the mother figure is irrevocably defiled and is subjected to abjection. The maternal body is associated with impurity (blood, excrement, etc.), contrast to symbolic paternal consciousness. Kristeva states that art and religious rituals help prevent the erosion of the maternal and paternal boundaries, thereby allowing an individual to not succumb irretrievably into the comforting dyadic relationship with the mother and lose identity. The oedipal crisis is resolved in the case of Ganesha by depicting him as lacking in an ideal masculine body, who, thus unlike his 'phallic' brother Kartikeya, becomes an ascetic, ceases to be a paternal figure and thereby pleases his ascetic father Shiva.

==== Shiva-Shakti psychoanalysis in literature ====
The Indian author Raja Rao explored the metaphysics of gender in his works and presented humans as beings endowed with androgynous sensibilities irrespective of their gender expression. The androgyny in humans, represented by the union of Shiva-Shakti, balances itself during intercourse wherein the shakti in a woman seeks the shiva of a man, while at other times the shiva of a woman seeks the shakti in a man, and vice versa.

Rao characterized women as being three types: the ideal Hindu woman, who is an incarnation of shakti; the fallen Hindu woman; and the non-Hindu woman, who is intelligent and sensuous yet flawed in an essential way. All the male protagonists in Rao's works are Brahmins, versed in the Upanishads, and some of them see and worship the same essential spirit, the latent shakti, in their women including mother, wife, sister, whore, and lover; whereas the women worship the latent shiva in their men.

== Sociological cultural views ==
=== Shakti and feminism ===
Various religious scholars have tried to assess whether the Hindu Goddess represents the ideals of feminism, with the resulting interpretations being largely inconclusive or subjective. The nature and condition of women in a goddess worship culture is complex and multifaceted. The recognition of the divine, as the primordial feminine force Shakti, attests to the autonomous nature of women and their power. Susan Wadley states that the concept of Shakti is fundamental to understand "Hindu women, their status, roles and powers". In Hindu milieu, stri shakti ('the power of women'), connotes the ideas about women and their power. Cynthia Ann Humes argues this notion of power differs from the Western sense as it is "not agency but, rather, potentiality". Rita Sherma contends that Hindu expression of female agency, influenced by perception of divine feminine, differs from Western expression. Phyllis K. Herman points that while Western feminism has associated kitchens with the subordination of women and reject it as a place of power, Hindu feminism regards the kitchen area (rasoī) as sacred. The actions of a woman in the kitchen are likened to a priest in the temple, with their works ensuring the Wellbeing of people and this world.

Some feminists and religious scholars argue that presence of Hindu goddesses has not necessarily benefited the position of women in Indian society, at least outwardly. Sunder Rajan and Stanley Kurtz reason that patriarchy and hierarchy explains the contradictions between Hindu goddesses and the status of Indian women. Rajan notes that, in one Indian state, there seems to be no correlation between women's literacy and the worship of goddesses. Kathleen Erndl, who found many examples of Hindu women empowered by identification with goddesses, reckoned that Hindu feminists then only need to rescue Shakti from its patriarchal constraints. Though Kali's trampling of Shiva is a favorite of both Indian and Western feminists for its symbolism of female power, autonomy and dominance; Tracy Pintchman insists that there is no correlation between symbols and interpretations, as they are highly subjective. Rajan sees goddesses as shaped by qualities desired in females rather than by strong or exceptional women. Jeffrey Kripal proves that the need for domination and intimacy make up this desire in men. Much of the myths and rituals imply that goddesses dominate, albeit temporarily, when the gods recede against the demons, suggesting female ascendancy when patriarchy breaks down.

Rita Gross notes that in the Indian myths and legends, though men wield power, the authority to do so is bestowed onto them by women, owing to their 'natural moral' constitution. Kurtz observes that women who worship goddesses tend to sympathize more with the males in their lives than with the females or even about themselves. E. H. Rick Jarow states that, "Even if the stage of the world is running through śakti, it is men who are given the leading roles in this play". Brenda Dobia says the Goddess is a living presence who reveals herself across cultural and religious divides. Gross supports this view and believes that the goddess of Indian religions is a "theological resource" with whom one can counter Abrahamic monotheism's long effort to eradicate her. In representations of female divinity, the Hindu Goddess is unparalleled, and has inspired some religious feminists in the West to recover and revive the idea of the divine feminine. Sally Kempton states that Shakti constitutes the true feminine power and advocates for sacred feminism—a spiritual, apolitical form of feminism wherein men and women realize shakti as their "deepest core"—their "interior face"—and tune into her energy, becoming aware of their own full potential. (Note: The experience of oneness with Shakti is expressed in Śākta speech by the mantra: Sāham—"She I am.")

=== Shakti and widowhood ===
The Hindu world view characterized women as "being Shaktis", "personifications of cosmic feminine power or shakti". However, the widows are disparaged. Women are believed to embody the highly potent "sexually voracious shakti", which is sought to be regulated by marriage and reproduction. The widows are viewed as still embodying it, threatening dishonor. Upon marriage, women who control their shakti, have it transmuted into Dharmik shakti (moral power), while those who do not, wreak havoc. To lessen their shakti, and for having failed in the chief "wifely duty" of protecting and preserving the lives of their husbands, the widows are often ill-treated, and accused of being witches and prostitutes. They are proscribed from wider society, wear any ornaments and bright dress, and made to eat only a small amount of 'cooling' foods so as to deplete their shakti. Women with assertive voice, plump body, and autonomy are seen as pakka shakti (strong shakti), and representatives of unrestrained Shakti, considered dangerous.

Despite such norms, several young Hindu widows in Varanasi have taken recourse to "Shakti-goddess" identity to assert themselves and wade through societal constraints. They downplay negativity by associating with the cosmic Hindu mother, and often say, "All children are my children, all women are the Mother-Goddess; my children get only love from me—like the Goddess". Identifying with Goddess enhanced their positive self-regard. In women, relating oneself with goddesses is found to induce deeper connection with shakti and understand it as an internal force rather than an external entity, thereby attain greater self-control. The widows believe shakti is the true strength and fire like power of the Goddess, and women embody it sixteen times more than men. The young widows work hard, and procure enough wealth to keep themselves and dependents in good stead, seen by their detractors as a validation of them being pakka shakti.

The Indian scholar Indira Goswami, widowed at young age, but who later became an award winning writer credited Shakti for her transformation from a powerless being into empowered becoming.

=== Shakti and female leadership ===
Among the Hindu denominations, Shakta traditions are more accepting of women as gurus or leaders. Women in these goddess-centric traditions have more religious freedoms and inclusivity compared to others. Shakta holy women are more prevalent, and are common as gurus, especially in tantra, regarded as a "dharma for women!", with Bhairavi Brahmani being a famous example. The female gurus are seen as the Goddess in a personal, interactive mode, primarily that of teacher. As perfect embodiments of shakti, the female gurus self-identity themselves as the goddess, even so by others; and are generally called Mataji (respected Mother), also the most common name of the goddess. (Note: "[M]ost of the female gurus active in the twentieth century and today have had the appellation 'Ma' (Mother) in their titles, including Gauri Ma, Anandamayi Ma, Ma Jaya, Jayashri Ma, Shree Ma, Anandi Ma, Karunamayi Ma, Meera Ma, Ammachi (Mata Amritanandamayi), and Ganga Ma. ... 'Mother' is a term of respect in common parlance in India; traditionally, kinship terms are used in social conversation rather than given first names. In ordinary society, however, there would tend to be a match between the social nomenclature of mother and the biological fact of motherhood; but this connection is ruptured in the persona of the female guru.") While few marry, many matajis who live more independently reject marriage, often at the behest of the goddess. Married women in traditional Indian society have less freedom. Divine possession by the goddess is one of the few acceptable norms to avoid marriage.

==== In woman-led spiritual movements ====
The female leaders of new age woman-led spiritual movements, such as the Indian guru Anandmurti Gurumaa, are especially popular among women for whom their female guru is said to embody shakti. Gurumaa established Shakti, a non-governmental organization in India with the mission "to empower the girl child", and has been a forthright activist for girls' education and the abolition of Sex-selective abortion of female fetuses.

==== Women's leadership in a Shakta tradition ====
An anthropological study of women in leadership roles at a temple community dedicated to Shakti in Toronto noted that when women become leaders, they emancipate themselves and others by sacralising their roles and wield power as a means of service unto others. When women work with a sense of detachment and service, their inherent shakti is believed to transform into Dharmik shakti (moral power), which is when their shakti becomes truly potent and overpowering. The working women were found less inclined to accept patriarchal narratives and perform collectively the duties earlier restricted to males. The Hindu perception of divine feminine in women was an influential factor in expression of female agency. While acknowledging the ability of the divine Adiparashakti to act for her devotees, the women also affirmed the ability of "real women" with śakti to act as well. In a more positive work environment, they were able to be reshape and redevelop their personality. Curiously, a significant percentage (22%) of women refused to identify as male or female, and addressed both the male guru and the goddess as Amma (Mother).

=== Shakti and Hindu nationalism ===
==== Shakti, masculinity, and political power ====
The idea of Shakti forms an integral part in Hindu discourses of political thought. In the rural areas of Odisha, rituals commemorate symbolic union of a local goddess (Ramachandi) with the region's king. A part of Shakti of the goddess is believed to unite with the royal male principle, thus channelling the power of the goddess in the power of the king, which is reflected in his masculinity. During the British Raj, when native power structures were dismantled, the people worshiped the goddess to overcome the colonial rulers and rejuvenate local masculinity.

The various British and Muslim conquerors of India characterized Hindus as effeminate. Bankim Chandra Chatterjee, in an ironic way, intentionally used this notion of feminity to counter the colonizers. In his literary works, he presented Shakti as the saviour of Hindus. In Anandamath, the goddess Kali, as the personification of the Hindu nation, defeats Muslim usurpers by the means of her feminine energy. Here, it was hoped that Shakti would energize Indians to reject oppression, and that the unjust political and social situation of the Hindus would make them mad about it and take action like Kali. The novel also contained the poem Vande Mataram, which characterized India as a goddess (Mother India) and juxtaposed surrender to her with submission to Islam, with the former being a better option for Indians. Sri Aurobindo said Vande Mataram is a mantra revealed to Indians by Chatterjee. Aurobindo insisted that nationalist activity is a religious spiritual exercise, and turned "Śakti into a beautiful, complex, and powerful symbol" for political action. His usage of Shakti imagery and the promotion of Kali worship resulted in violent revolutionary acts against the British colonizers.

Diametrically, Mahatma Gandhi, a contemporary of Aurobindo, also invoked the symbolism of Shakti (divinizing India as Bharat Mata), albeit with an emphasis on the ideal of nonviolence. For Gandhi, feminine power denoted a moral and spiritual force far superior to the force of arms. He advocated Satyagraha, a form of nonviolent resistance, rooted in virtues, such as, Kshama (forgiveness), ahimsa (non-harming), pavitrata (purity), Shanti (tranquility), and daya (compassion); and noted that these qualities are linguistically feminine and everywhere "are met with in greater measure in women." Gandhi once said he wanted to convert women's capacity for "self-sacrifice and suffering into shakti power." He rued that women's marvelous power is lying dormant and his experiment in non-violence would have been instantly successful if he secured women's help.

==== Shakti symbolism in an electoral democracy ====
In post-independent modern India, shakti continues to be evoked in the partisan narratives of Indian politics. In the run up to the 2024 Indian general election, opposition leader Rahul Gandhi described their struggle against the ruling Hindu nationalist Bharatiya Janata Party (BJP) as a fight against "Shakti" (later clarified as asuri shakti demonic power), referring to the arm-twisting tactics of the BJP in capturing institutional power rather than the divine feminine power. However, the BJP leaders, including the prime minister Narendra Modi, latched on this use of the word shakti and framed the election as a fight between those who worship shakti and those who want to eradicate it, while also condemning the opposition for its alleged misogyny and insult of Hindus. Nevertheless, BJP uses shakti in its own policies aimed at women voters, as in "Nari Shakti" (women's power), and "Mission Shakti" — programs to empower women, and enhance their safety respectively.

Shakti symbolism is also utilized in other Hindu nationalist groups such as Durga Vahini, an exclusive women only paramilitary organization. The trainers here are referred as "Matr Shakti" (Mother shakti). They equip young women with combat skills, educate on Hindu issues, and inspire them to embody both the bengin and fierce aspects of the goddess, to become good wives as well as good soldiers. Though the young women report being empowered, Historian Shreena Gandhi citing their anti-minority sentiments calls such empowerment problematic, and draws parallel with the Women of the Ku Klux Klan. Hindu nationalist and white supremacist groups evoke Aryan heritage, and share anti-minority views in common with regard to religion and race respectively. An earliest proponent of these views, Savitri Devi, is popular with both these groups.

The memorial of India's first and only female prime minister, Indira Gandhi, is named Shakti Sthal.

=== Shakti and cinema ===
==== Goddess genre ====
Feature films portraying the Hindu goddess as the central protagonist are common in the cinema of South India and have come to be known as the "goddess genre" films, a popular subgenre under the category of Hindu mythological films. The goddess genre films are mostly characterized by their narratives of how a devout female and a skeptical male come together into the 'goddess fold' and take on the evildoer, the prime antagonist. This genre is also anecdotally called 'women's genre', as they depict, unlike the patriarchal mainstream Indian films, the predicaments of women from the female point of view and are highly popular among women audiences, majorly rural based lower classes, but increasingly popular among all demographics.

==== Invoking Darshana ====
For many Hindus, the goddess genre films offer the experience of watching the goddess on-screen, resonating with their religious belief of darshana, i.e., to see or be seen by the deity. For orthodox Hindus who regularly see the images and idols of their deities in a prayer (puja) room, the experience of seeing them on-screen is not different as they both engage a core aspect of their belief system, namely darshana. The goddess genre materially enacts darshana for the viewer by making the "intangible" transcendent-accessible through the material medium of film. Darshana is also the term used for the six major schools of Hindu philosophy.

Scholars Diana Eck and Robert Fuller note that in Hindu theological view, darshana is a way for "the devotee to literally partake in the power (śakti) of the deity". This notion of darshana deeply embedded in the psyche of Hindus makes the on-screen vision of goddesses an emotional experience. Diane Mines states, "Hindus see vision as a material exchange, a kind of touching." The goddess genre corroborates this notion of touch and vision, or darshana. In a scene from the 1970 film Namma Veetu Deivam (The Deity in our House), regarded to exemplify the goddess genre, the goddess plays a prank on her devotee priest by making herself perceived in human skin to his touch while he puts sindoor (vermillion) on her forehead as part of the daily ritual sanctification of the goddess's stone idol, the moment he realizes this miracle, her human form turns back to stone.

The goddess films by making the intangible-tangible, assert that the abstract concept of a primordial nurturing and protective power is the goddess. These films offer a "psychophysical enculturation" into the Hindu worldview, and their appeal is deeply rooted in the Hindu beliefs and culture. The films' narratives entwine the vedic and folklore myths, and showcase the power and glory of the Hindu goddess as the divine mother and the guardian of her devotees. Films such as Aathi Parasakthi (1971) and Melmaruvathoor Adiparasakthi (1985) re-enact the goddess creation myths central to shaktism.

==== Women empowerment ====
Diane Carson, a professor of film studies points out that in the realm of cinema, women acquiring a voice of their own plays a vital role in their empowerment; the goddess genre is commendable in this aspect. As the goddess of speech (Vāc), she makes herself heard without the presence of any physical female. In Ammoru (1995), the goddess as the overseer, speaks authoritatively from a transcendent and omnipresent vantage. Film theorist Kaja Silverman states this could not be possible with representations of mortal females as they are always located within the male gaze. While traditionally films show women to be under the purview of male gaze, with the exception of female ghosts in horror genre, a striking factor of the goddess genre is their presentation of the feminine body (albeit a divine one) as being completely outside the scope of male sensory perception.

Mary Ann Doane explains how in traditional cinema, the gaze, is established as a power dynamic with passivity ascribed to the female and activity to the male. A woman analyzing a subject intellectually is seen as appropriation of the male gaze and a threat to cinematic representation of gender roles. However, in the goddess genre, the goddess's power is shown to endure through the eyes referred to as "kann malar" (lotus eyes). Here, the gaze is the medium through which the divine feminine wields her authority, she moves the mortal subjects and directs their mind and voice by her gaze. In Melmaruvathoor Adiparasakthi (1985), the demure female protagonist changes instantly and stares boldly at her abusive husband cognizing his secrets and foretells his future leaving him frightened. The change in the female gaze from timidity to bold signals the audience about the descent and presence of the goddess within her meek devotee. The man who still castigates the woman ends up losing his life.

By their projection of the metaphorical "conceptual" through the "material" artifact, the goddess films show that the power of the goddess endures through physical facets. A talisman ensures special link between the goddess and her "mortal daughter"—the female devotee. Having bindi or kumkum (vermillion mark) on forehead at all times is emphasized as tradition, a very strong link between the goddess power (Śakti) and bindi is indicated. A connection with the goddess is presented as the only path to female empowerment. Despite the projection of such ideals, the well-being of ordinary women did not improve. Interestingly this genre of films were highly successful in the 1970s when feminist activism peaked in India and women began to access higher education and jobs. The goddess films flourished in the Indian state of Tamil Nadu more than anywhere else. They ascended popularity during the 1960s and 70s when the Dravidian political movement aggressively attacked Hinduism by desecrating the Hindu deities and traditions for alleged subjection of the Dravidian region into Aryan culture. The goddess genre reified the Hindu beliefs and customs that were under threat and provided a psychological succor to the majority of Hindu masses who remained mere spectators to the iconoclastic political activities.

==== Newer developments ====
The newer imaginings of the divine feminine have turned the goddess figure into "abject" or the "monstrous feminine" confining her within patriarchal power structures. Devi (1999) shocked the audience by presenting the goddess as being romantically involved with a mortal male, even though traditional Hindu mythology did not have such representations for the divine feminine. The goddess here is shown to transform into a mortal woman by voluntarily giving up her sthri-shakti (a concept championed by feminists as 'woman-power') in order to marry the man. The plot prioritised and celebrated the role of a man-serving, subservient wife (pativrata) as the ideal for women over any female divinity, and subsumed even the goddess under patriarchy.

== Epilogue ==
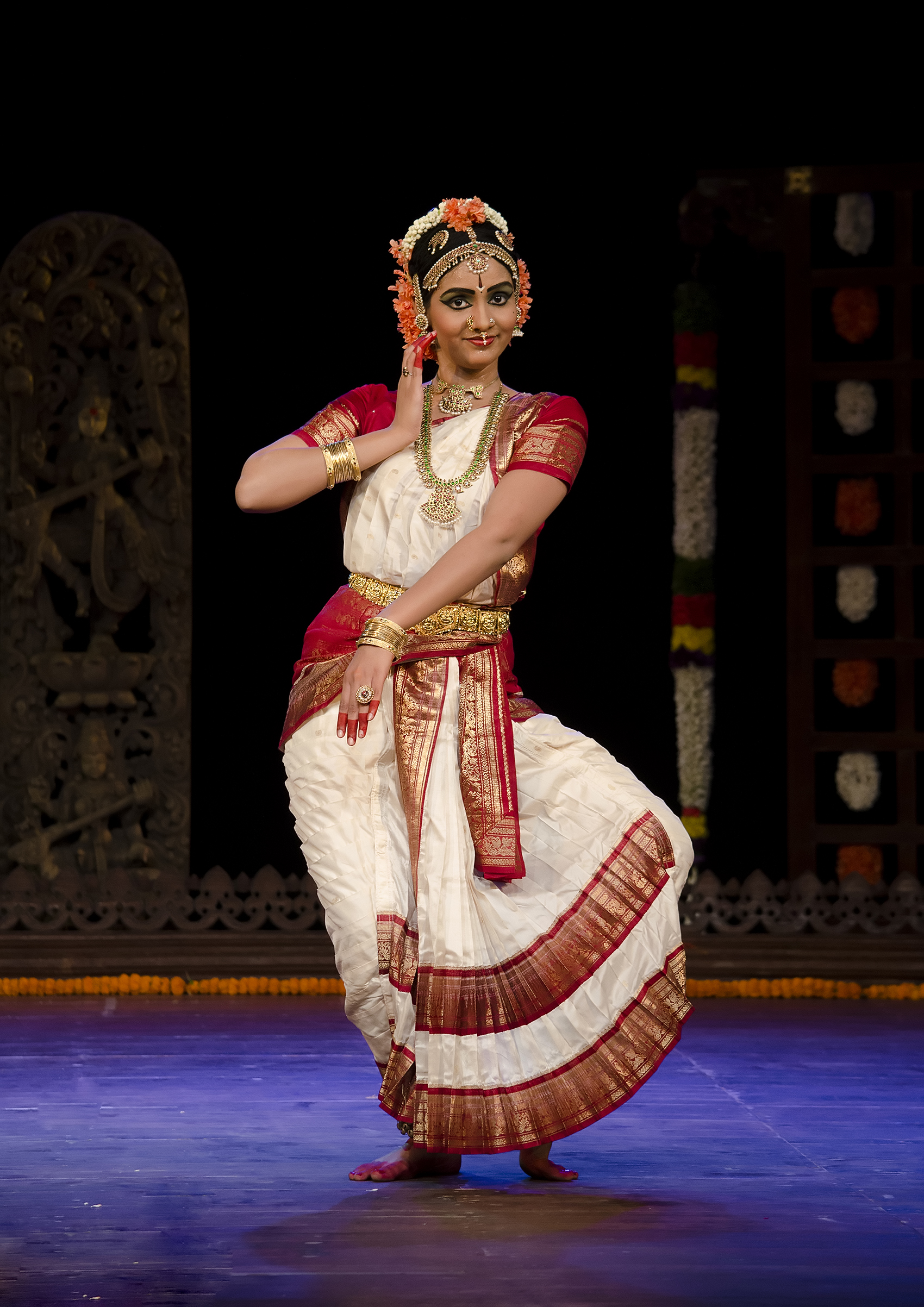
Indian classical dance is a way of being religious. The woman is styled in the image of the Goddess and enacts as her.

The belief in a goddess has once been a creed of various ancient cultures around the world, but whilst the traditions of goddess worship are extinct in almost all belief systems, the phenomenon of goddess worship is alive and thriving in Hinduism, continuing well into the 21st century. Though goddess worship traditions are prevalent across the Indian subcontinent, they are especially stronger and rich in the regions of Southern India that have remained more or less purely Hindu.

The Hindu goddess traditions have also started to make inroads into the West by their association with Yoga and Indian classical dance, and are becoming more popular with American women. The Parashakthi Temple in the United States is a revered and sacred site of Shakti in the West.
