= Chris Bratton (drummer) =

American drummer (born 1969)

- Born: January 16, 1969 (age 57)
- Genre: Hardcore punk
- Occupations: Drummer, musician, songwriter
- Instrument: Drum kit
- Years active: 1983–present
- Label: Revelation
- Member of: Chain of Strength
- Formerly of: No For An Answer; Inside Out; Drive Like Jehu; Wool; Statue; Justice League

Chris Bratton (born January 16, 1969) is an American drummer involved in the hardcore punk scene since 1983. He has drummed in several influential bands including Justice League, No For An Answer, Chain Of Strength, Inside Out, Statue, Drive Like Jehu and Wool.

== Career ==
=== With Inside Out ===
Inside Out were a hardcore punk band, in particular, they were a part of its youth crew subculture. They cited influences including Minor Threat, Bad Brains and Led Zeppelin. Just prior to the band's breakup, the music being written was significantly more influenced by hip hop, particularly Run-DMC.

Songs were composed by DiCara and de la Rocha evenly, with some songs having instrumentals and lyrics written by DiCara and some by de la Rocha while others were collaborations between the two.

They have been cited as an influence by Have Heart, Stick to Your Guns, Linkin Park, Refused, Incendiary, Coalesce and Mouthpiece.

=== With Chain Of Strength ===
The first Chain of Strength release was a 7" EP entitled True Till Death, released through Revelation Records. After parting ways with Revelation, they formed their own Foundation Records to release another 7", What Holds Us Apart. Both of these records eventually fell out of print, yet were still in demand. As a result, Revelation Records released both EPs (plus one unreleased track) as a CD/LP called The One Thing That Still Holds True.

Both EP's were released in the UK on First Strike Records, a record label based in Wigan, run from a skate shop called Alans.

From 2006-2008, Alex Barreto played bass for the band Alien Ant Farm. Currently, he is the guitarist of Excel.

=== With Drive Like Jehu ===
Drive Like Jehu was an American post-hardcore band from San Diego active from 1990 to 1995. It was formed by rhythm guitarist and vocalist Rick Froberg and lead guitarist John Reis, ex-members of Pitchfork, along with bassist Mike Kennedy and drummer Mark Trombino, both from Night Soil Man, after their two bands disbanded in 1990. Drive Like Jehu's music was characterized by passionate singing, unusual song structure, indirect melodic themes, intricate guitar playing, and calculated use of tension, resulting in a distinctive sound amongst other post-hardcore acts and helped to catalyze the evolution of hardcore punk into emo.

After releasing their eponymous debut in 1991 through local record labels Cargo Music and Headhunter Records, Drive Like Jehu signed to major label Interscope Records along with Reis' other band Rocket from the Crypt. Their second album, 1994's Yank Crime, gained a cult following, but the group disbanded shortly afterward. Reis continued with Rocket from the Crypt and Trombino became a successful record producer and audio engineer, while Froberg and Kennedy pursued careers outside of music. In 1999, Reis and Froberg began playing together again in Hot Snakes, which was active from 1999 to 2005 and again from 2011 to present. Reis also re-released Yank Crime through his Swami Records label.

=== With Wool ===
Wool formed in the early 1990s when brothers Pete and Franz Stahl (vocals/guitar and guitar/vocals, respectively) were forced to terminate their popular band Scream after bassist Skeeter Thompson left the band and after drummer Dave Grohl joined Seattle grunge band Nirvana midway through a U.S. tour.

The brothers then teamed up with drummerPeter Moffett (also a member of Government Issue and Burning Airlines) and bassist Al Bloch (member of Concrete Blonde, and brother of Seattle Sub-Pop legend Kurt Bloch from the Fastbacks).

The quartet's first single "Little Darlin'", is a well-regarded punk single. Then, the band released 1992's rollicking Budspawn, which was released independently on External Records (the original vinyl version consisted of eight tracks clocking in at over 30 minutes while the CD version had six tracks and was classified as an EP instead). The material on Budspawn combined the four members' inherent punk aesthetics with a tendency toward more straight-ahead, anthemic hard rock and drug-induced psychedelia.

=== With No For An Answer ===
No For an Answer was a Californian hardcore punk band active primarily between 1987 and 1989. The band has also done a couple of reunion shows, most notably the Revelation 25th anniversary shows in California.

== Discography ==
=== with Chain of Strength ===
- True Till Death 7" (Revelation Records)
- What Holds Us Apart 7" (Foundation Records)
- The One Thing That Still Holds True CD/LP/Cassette (Revelation Records)

=== with Justice League ===
- "Think Or Sink" (Just 4 Fun Records)
- "Shattered Dreams" CD/LP/Cassette (Fartblossom Enterprizes)
- "Reach Out" 12" (Fartblossom Enterprizes)

=== with No For An Answer ===
- "You Laugh" EP (1988) Revelation Records
- "A Thought Crusade" (1989) Hawker/Roadrunner Records

=== with Wool ===
- Little Darlin (7-inch) (1991)
- Mayday (7-inch) (1992)
- Box Set (LP/CD) (1994)
- Shine! / Short Term Memory Loss (1996)

=== with Inside Out ===
- No Spiritual Surrender (1990)
