= 18.61 =

Studio album by 108
- Released: April 13, 2010
- Recorded: February 2009 in Boston, Massachusetts
- Genres: Metalcore, hardcore punk
- Length: 23:31
- Label: Deathwish (DWI108)
- Producer: Alex Garcia-Rivera

108 chronology
A New Beat from a Dead Heart (2007)	18.61 (2010)

18.61 is the fifth studio album by the American metallic hardcore band 108. The album follows 2007's A New Beat from a Dead Heart. The album was the first to be recorded with drummer Michael Justian, formerly of Trap Them and Unearth. 18.61 was released on April 13, 2010, through Deathwish Inc.

== Background ==
The band entered the studio to record 18.61 with Alex Garcia-Rivera, formerly of Give Up the Ghost, in February 2009 originally intending to record a four-song EP. The band stated, "Our desire was to record a raw and stripped down record, and once we hit the studio, things developed so quickly that it was clear that recording just an EP was out of the question." 18.61 was mixed by Kurt Ballou of Converge at his own GodCity studio.

18.61 is the final album released by 108 with lead singer Robert Fish. In March 2010, before the official release of 18.61, Fish announced his departure citing that he was "struggling to find my place within 108 due to the personal evolution I have gone through." After the departure of Fish, the remaining members of 108 discussed the possibilities of ending the band and breaking up. However, in April 2010, the band announced that 108 would continue without Robert Fish. While the band has no intention of replacing their former lead singer, 108 will still tour in support of 18.61 and continue writing new music. Commenting on the departure of Fish, guitarist Vic DiCara stated, "Robert's contribution to the band was so vast and touched so many aspects of 108, that we fully realize [we] can not 'replace' him. We don't plan to try. Instead, we will do something very different from what we did as a band with him."

The theme of 18.61 continues with 108's strong interest in Hare Krishna. The title of the album references the 61st couplet of the 18th chapter of the sacred Hindu scripture, the Bhagavad Gita. The passage translates in English to "The controller of all lies at the heart of the machine, and connects its wires to the living being who is under its spell."

== Reception ==
Professional ratings
Review scores
Source	Rating
Alternative Press	3.5/5 stars
Rock Sound	(8/10)
Lambgoat.com	8/10 stars

== Track listing ==
1. "God Talk" – 1:04
2. "Crescent Moon" – 1:28
3. "18.61" – 2:22
4. "Reduced" – 2:20
5. "Relentless Masters" – 2:20
6. "Fallen Angel" – 1:47
7. "Mannequins" – 2:00
8. "Ashes/Dust" – 2:11
9. "Forever Is Destroyed" – 2:49
10. "Early Funeral" – 5:10

== Personnel ==
108

- Tim Cohen – bass guitar
- Vic DiCara – guitar, vocals
- Robert Fish – screaming
- Michael Justian – drums
- Jacob Bannon – vocals on "Relentless Masters"

Production and artwork

- Alex Garcia-Rivera – producer
- Kurt Ballou – mixing
- Carl Saff – mastering
- 108 – art design
