= Do or Die (Burn album) =

Studio album by Burn
- Released: September 8, 2017
- Genre: Hardcore punk
- Length: 37:34
- Label: Deathwish (DW198)
- Producer: Kurt Ballou

Burn chronology
From the Ashes (2016)	Do or Die (2017)

Professional ratings
Review scores
Source	Rating
Exclaim!	7/10
Metal Hammer	3.5/5 stars
Metal Injection	9.5/10

Do or Die is a studio album by the American rock band Burn. After releasing a handful of EPs throughout their nearly 30-year lifespan, Do or Die is Burn's first full-length studio album since forming in 1989. It was released on September 8, 2017 through Jacob Bannon's (Converge) indie label Deathwish Inc. Do or Die features founding members vocalist Chaka Malik and guitarist Gavin Van Vlack, along with new members drummer Abbas Muhammad and bassist Tyler Krupsky. It was produced by Converge guitarist Kurt Ballou and mastered by Howie Weinberg.

Burn promoted Do or Die with an online stream of "Ill Together" in July 2017 followed by the title track "Do or Die" in August 2017. The band supported Do or Die with an October 2017 United States tour with Comeback Kid and Jesus Piece.

== Track listing ==
1. "Fate" – 2:28
2. "Ill Together" – 4:31
3. "Flame" – 3:34
4. "Beauty" – 2:57
5. "Dead Identity" – 2:31
6. "Do or Die" – 3:57
7. "Last Great Sea" – 6:28
8. "New Morality" – 3:04
9. "Unfuck Yourself" – 4:35
10. "Climb Out" – 3:29
