= Dan O'Mahony =

American singer (born 1967)

- Born: Dan O'Mahony; 2 October 1967 (age 59)
- Origin: Orange County, California, U.S.
- Genre: Hardcore punk
- Occupations: Singer, songwriter, author, journalist, activist
- Instrument: Vocals
- Years active: 1987 - Current
- Label: Revelation
- Website: PointNineNine.com

Dan O'Mahony (born October 2, 1967) is a musician, writer, and political activist from Orange County, California, USA. He is currently the West Coast Chairman of the .99 Advocacy Fund and Point nine nine.

== Music ==
In the 1980s, O'Mahony was the lead singer for hardcore punk band No For An Answer (NFAA). The band is credited with being one of the cornerstones of the straight edge movement on the west coast and was the first west coast release by the prominent independent label Revelation Records. NFAA was often associated with the straight edge and skinhead subcultures, although O'Mahony rejected these labels. Later O'Mahony recorded records as the lead singer of bands such as Carry Nation, Voicebox, Speak 714, John Henry Holiday, God Forgot, and 411, which released the album This Isn't Me in 1991. In all he sang on 11 records not counting assorted compilations and numerous live releases. Throughout his career O'Mahony was known for the heavily activist nature of his lyrics espousing the rejection of homophobia, domestic abuse, the First Gulf War, and many self-destructive behaviors.

In 2009 O'Mahony began experimenting with spoken word, organizing performances with Kevin Seconds and Sam McPheeters.

== Writing ==
O'Mahony is the author of two autobiographical books, Three Legged Race and Four Letter World. He worked as a columnist for the seminal punk rock monthly publication Maximum Rocknroll from the mid-1980s until the early 1990s. In 2010 he began accepting assignments as a freelance journalist and writing for various political blogs.

== Politics ==
O'Mahony is considered a stout progressive and a populist. In 2011 as a result of disillusion with the unfocused nature of his local Occupy movement, O'Mahony co-founded the .99 Advocacy Fund and Point Nine Nine.
