= The One Thing That Still Holds True =

Compilation album by Chain of Strength
- Released: March 19, 1995
- Recorded: 1989 – February 1990
- Genre: Hardcore punk, youth crew
- Length: 23:19
- Label: Revelation (REV 010)
- Producer: Chain of Strength

Chain of Strength chronology
What Holds Us Apart 7" (1990)	The One Thing That Still Holds True (1995)

Professional ratings
Review scores
Source	Rating
Punknews	4/5 stars

The One Thing That Still Holds True is a compilation album released in 1995 by American hardcore punk band Chain of Strength on Revelation Records. The album consists of the band's entire recorded history.

== Track list ==
No.	Title	Length
1.	"Impact"	2:53
2.	"Too Deep Until Now"	2:28
3.	"The Space Between"	1:32
4.	"Through These Eyes"	1:44
5.	"Hurts to Ask"	1:41
6.	"True Till Death"	2:23
7.	"Just How Much"	1:56
8.	"There is a Difference"	2:47
9.	"Never Understand"	2:18
10.	"Let Down"	1:44
11.	"Best of Time"	1:53

Notes:

Track 1 was previously unreleased.
Tracks 2–5 previously released as "What Holds Us Apart" on Foundation Records 1990.

Recorded at Pendragon Studios, May 89 - Feb 90.

Tracks 6–11 previously released as "True Till Death" on Revelation Records 1989.

Recorded at Spot, 1989.

== Personnel ==
Bass – Alex Barreto
Drums – Chris Bratton
Engineer – Bill Krondell* (tracks: 2 to 5)
Guitar – Ryan Hoffman
Guitar (Crunch) – Frosty
Producer – Chain Of Strength
Vocals – Curt Canales
