= Burn (Burn EP) =

EP by Burn
- Released: 1990
- Recorded: 1990
- Genre: Hardcore punk
- Length: 11:34
- Label: Revelation

Burn chronology
Burn (1990)	Cleanse (2001)

Burn is the self-titled, debut release of the American hardcore band Burn, released in 1990 on Revelation Records.

== Track listing ==
1. "Shall Be Judged"
2. "Godhead"
3. "Drown"
4. "Out of Time"
