= A New Beat from a Dead Heart =

Studio album by 108
- Released: June 26, 2007
- Genre: Metalcore
- Length: 34:33
- Label: Deathwish (DWI59)
- Producer: Kurt Ballou

108 chronology
Creation. Sustenance. Destruction. (2006)	A New Beat from a Dead Heart (2007)	18.61 (2010)

Professional ratings
Review scores
Source	Rating
Punknews.org	4/5 stars
Sputnikmusic	(4/5)

A New Beat from a Dead Heart is the fourth studio album by the American hardcore band 108. The album was released on June 26, 2007, through Deathwish Inc.

== Track listing ==
No.	Title	Length
1.	"Declarations on a Grave"	1:31
2.	"Guilt"	1:52
3.	"Angel Strike Man"	2:19
4.	"Three Hundred Liars"	3:12
5.	"Resurrect to Destroy"	2:54
6.	"Martyr Complex"	1:45
7.	"The Sad Truth"	3:35
8.	"My Redemption Song"	3:31
9.	"Bibles + Guns = The American Dream?"	2:42
10.	"(Il)logical End"	1:26
11.	"We Walk Through Walls"	4:07
12.	"Our Kind"	2:35
13.	"Repeat"	3:04
