= This Isn't Me =

Studio album by 411
- Released: 1991
- Recorded: February – June 1991
- Genre: Punk
- Length: 26:42
- Label: Workshed
- Producer: Donnell Cameron

411 chronology
Say It (1989)	This Isn't Me (1991)

Professional ratings
Review scores
Source	Rating
Punknews.org	5/5 stars

This Isn't Me is an album by the punk band 411, released in 1991.

== Track listing ==
All songs by Murphy/O'Mahony unless otherwise noted.

1. "Face the Flag" – 2:53
2. "Blackout" – 2:33
3. "This Isn't Me" – 3:07
4. "Self Help" – 2:15
5. "Destroy the Dream" – 1:50
6. "The Naked Face" – 3:16
7. "Those Homophobic" – 2:10
8. "Our Father" – 3:06
9. "Show Me" (O'Mahony, Stanton) – 2:41
10. "Carnal Knowledge" (O'Mahony, Stanton) – 2:51

== Personnel ==
- Donnell Cameron - Engineer, Producer
- 411 - Main Performer
- Kevin Murphy - Guitar, Vocals (Background)
- Josh Stanton - Bass, Vocals (Background)
- Gavin Oglesby - Vocals (Background)
- Aaron Silverman - Vocals (Background)
- Mike Murphy - Vocals (Background)
- Dave Smalley - Vocals (Background)
- Billy Rubin - Vocals (Background)
- Mario Reza - Vocals (Background)
- Mario Rubalcaba - Drums, Vocals (Background)
- John Yates - Logo
- Dan O'Mahony - Artwork, Vocals, Photography, Layout Design, Cover Photo, Vocals (Background)
- Dave Mandel - Photography
