= Shabda Brahman =

Transcendental sound of the Vedas

Shabda Brahman or Sabda-Brahman or Nada Brahman means transcendental sound (Shatapatha Brahmana III.12.48) or sound vibration (Shatpatha Brahmana Vi.16.51) or the transcendental sound of the Vedas (Shatpatha Brahmana Xi.21.36) or of Vedic scriptures (Shatpatha Brahmana X.20.43).

Shabda or sabda stands for word manifested by sound ('verbal') and such a word has innate power to convey a particular sense or meaning (Artha).

== In Hindu philosophy ==
According to the Nyaya and the Vaisheshika schools, Shabda means verbal testimony; to the Sanskrit grammarians, Yaska, Panini and Katyayana it meant a unit of language or speech or vac. In the philosophical terms this word appears for the first time in the Maitri Upanishad (Sloka VI.22) that speaks of two kinds of Brahman - Shabda Brahman ('Brahman with sound') and Ashabda Brahman ('soundless Brahman'). Bhartrhari speaks about the creative power of shabda, the manifold universe is a creation of Shabda Brahman (Brihadaranyaka Upanishad IV.i.2). Speech is equated with Brahman (Shatpatha Brahmana 2.1.4.10).The Rig Veda states that Brahman extends as far as Vāc (R.V.X.114.8), and has hymns in praise of Speech as the Creator (R.V.X.71.7) and as the final abode of Brahman (R.V.I.164.37). Time is the creative power of Shabda Brahman.

Purva Mimamsa deals with Shabda Brahman ('cosmic sound or word') which is endowed with names and forms and is projected in vedic revelations (the mantras, hymns, prayers etc.). Vedanta deals with Parama Brahman ('the Ultimate Reality') which is transcendent and devoid of material names and material forms. One has to become well established in Shabda Brahman before realizing Parama Brahman. Vedas are not the product of conventional language but the emanation of reality in form of Shabda (sound, word) which is the sole cause of creation and is eternal. Purva Mimamsa, an esoteric discipline, from the point of view of spiritual growth aims at attaining the heavenly happiness by realizing Shabda Brahman (cosmic sound) by conducting yajnas that help control the senses and the mind; when the mind and the senses are subdued the inner subtle sound is realized as Shabda Brahman.

== In Indian classical arts ==
The fundamental theory of Indian classical music, art and poetry is grounded in the theory of Nada Brahman or Shabda Brahman, and is linked with the Vedic religion. The Apara Brahman mentioned by Mandukya Upanishad is Nada Brahman or Shabda Brahman. Shiva Samhita states that whenever and wherever there is causal stress or Divine action, there is vibration (spandan or kampan), and wherever there is vibration or movement there sound (Shabda) is inevitable. "M" of Aum, the primordial vac represents shabda which is the root and essence of everything; it is Pranava and Pranava is Vedas, Vedas are Shabda Brahman. Consciousness in all beings is Shabda Brahman.

When the necessity of directing the Mantra (identical to Ishta) internally and to objects externally is transcended then one gains Mantra chaitanya which then awakens Atman chaitanya, the Divine Consciousness, and unites with it. The Mantra is Shabda Brahman and Ishta is the light of Consciousness. The prana, body and mind along with the entire universe, are all expressions of Mantra chaitanya. At the ultimate level of Shabda Brahman transcendental words (Nama-Brahman, Holy name) become materially wordless, transcendental forms become materially formless (rise from lower gunas to higher and transformed from material sattva to transcendental shuddha-sattva) and all multiplicity unified in Consciousness residing in that transcendent glory extends beyond mind and speech.

== In the Bhagavad Gita ==
In the Bhagavad Gita (Sloka VI.44) the term Shabda Brahman has been used to mean Vedic injunctions. Adi Shankara explains that the Yogic impressions do not perish even when held up for a long period, even he who seeks to comprehend the essence of Yoga and begins to tread the path of Yoga goes beyond the spheres of the fruits of Vedic works, he sets them aside. In this context Srimad Bhagavatam (Sloka III.33.7) has also been relied upon to high-light the disregard of Vedic rituals by the advanced transcendentalists. Gaudapada clarifies that the letter "a" of Aum leads to Visva, the letter "u"" leads to Taijasa and the letter "m" leads to Prajna. With regard to one freed from letters, there remains no attainment (Mandkya Karika I.23). Aum is Shabda Brahman, Aum is the Root Sound of which creation is a series of permutations.

== In Tantra ==
In Tantra, Sound is the first manifestation of Parama Shiva; in its primary stage it is a psychic wave. Its very existence entails the presence of spandan or movement ('vibration') without which there cannot be sound; spandan is the quality of Saguna Brahman and the world is the thought-projection of Saguna Shiva. The first sutra of Sarada Tilaka explains the significance and hidden meaning of Shabda Brahman.
