= No For An Answer =

American hardcore punk band

No for an Answer
- Origin: Orange County, California
- Genre: Hardcore punk
- Years active: 1987–1989, 1994, 2009–present
- Labels: Revelation; Hawker/Roadrunner; TKO; Cargo Music
- Members: Casey Jones; Gavin Oglesby; John Mastropaulo; Dan O'Mahoney
- Past members: Jeff Boetto; Chris Bratton; Zack de la Rocha; Joe Foster; Rob Hayworth; Quinn Mallard; Sterling Wilson

No for an Answer was a Californian hardcore punk band active primarily between 1987 and 1989. The band has also done a couple of reunion shows, most notably the Revelation 25th anniversary shows in California.

The band had a reputation for being a straight edge band and being associated with skinheads. Even having live footage of them playing during a WABC-TV news piece on the skinhead subculture. Although the lead singer Dan O'Mahony rejected both labels. O'Mahony stated that being straight edge involved more than just being drug free, and that they did not have the typical fashion sense and style of music that most straight edge and skinhead bands have. However they were still open about being against drugs and alcohol. With a few of their songs tackling the topic, as well other rough topics like child abuse.

== Members ==
=== Current members ===
- Casey Jones (1987–1988, 2009–present) – drums
- John Mastropaulo (1987–1988, 2009–present) – bass
- Gavin Oglesby (1987–present) – guitar
- Dan O'Mahony (1987–present) – vocals

=== Former members ===
- Jeff Boetto (1987) – bass
- Chris Bratton (1988–1989) – drums
- Zack de la Rocha (1988) – drums
- Rob Haworth (1988) – guitar
- Quinn Millard (1988) – drums
- Sterling Wilson (1988–1989) – bass
- Joe Foster (1989) – guitar (one show)

== Discography ==
- "You Laugh" EP (1988) Revelation Records
- "A Thought Crusade" (1989) Hawker/Roadrunner Records
- "It Makes Me Sick" (2011) TKO Records
- "No for an Answer / Carry Nation – A Thought Crusade / Face The Nation" (CD, Comp) (1996) Cargo Music/Tacklebox Records
