= Chain of Strength =

American hardcore punk band

- Origin: California
- Genre: Hardcore punk
- Years active: 1988–1991, 2012–2013, 2015–present
- Label: Revelation Records
- Members: Curt Canales; Ryan Hoffman; Chris Bratton; Alex Barreto; Frosty Crunch (Paul Hertz)

Chain of Strength is a straight edge hardcore punk band from Southern California that had its heyday in the late 1980s and early 1990s.

== Biography ==
The first Chain of Strength release was a 7" EP entitled True Till Death, released through Revelation Records. After parting ways with Revelation, they formed their own Foundation Records to release another 7", What Holds Us Apart. Both of these records eventually fell out of print, yet were still in demand. As a result, Revelation Records released both EPs (plus one unreleased track) as a CD/LP called The One Thing That Still Holds True.

Both EP's were released in the UK on First Strike Records, a record label based in Wigan, run from a skate shop called Alans.

From 2006-2008, Alex Barreto played bass for the band Alien Ant Farm. Currently, he is the guitarist of Excel.

== Members ==
- Curt Canales - Vocals
- Ryan Hoffman - Guitar
- Chris Bratton - Drums
- Alex Barreto - Bass
- Frosty Crunch (Paul Hertz) - Guitar

== Discography ==
- True Till Death 7" (Revelation Records)
- What Holds Us Apart 7" (Foundation Records) (image shown is of First Strike European 1st pressing,2nd pressing of 1500 is on blue vinyl/blue cover)
- The One Thing That Still Holds True CD/LP/Cassette (Revelation Records)
