= 108 (band) =

American hardcore band

- Origin: New York City, U.S.
- Genres: Hardcore punk, krishnacore, metalcore
- Years active: 1991–1996, 2005–present
- Labels: Deathwish, Lost & Found, Equal Vision
- Members: Rob Fish; Vic DiCara; Tim Cohen; Mike Justian; Kate Reddy
- Past members: Chris Daly; Len Greenblat; Tom Hogan; Antonio Valladares; Franklin Rhi

108 is an American hardcore band founded in 1991. Their music reflects the Hare Krishna faith of the band members.

== History ==
After splitting from the Zack De La Rocha-fronted band Inside Out, guitarist and Hare Krishna devotee Vraja Kishor das (a.k.a. Vic DiCara) formed 108 in 1991. While recording an EP, Rasaraja dasa (a.k.a. Rob Fish) joined on vocals. Following in the footsteps of the Cro-Mags and Antidote, they made sure to place their Krishna Consciousness at the forefront of their music.

Their first records, Holyname and Songs of Separation, were released on Equal Vision Records. These releases were followed by their participation in two documentary films, 108: The Final Tour and N.Y.H.C.

Following a prolonged break-up where DiCara relocated to India to become a monk, they planned to reform at Hellfest in 2005. Due to legal issues, that festival was cancelled at the last moment but 108 successfully re-booked special gigs in Philadelphia. They self-released a collection of demos and b-sides followed by a new full-length recording entitled "A New Beat From a Dead Heart" with Deathwish Inc.

On March 23, 2010, before the release of 18.61, it was announced that Rob Fish had quit the band, discontent with the band not being able to "redefine" its ties to faith. (Rob and Vic were no longer part of ISKCON by the time of the bands reformation.) The remaining members of the group later released the following statement: "108 has not broken up. Rasaraja [a.k.a. Robert Fish] has left the band, but 108 will continue in full force with a new direction and focus. We will be writing, recording and playing shows this year to support 18.61 and create new music."

Rob Fish rejoined the band in September 2010.

In May 2016, the band embarked on a series of reunion shows. May 21 in Flemington, New Jersey marked the return of Kate "Kate-08" Reddy. This was the first time she had played with the band in 20 years.

== Discography ==
=== Studio albums ===
- Holyname (1993, Equal Vision Records)
- Songs of Separation (1994, Equal Vision Records)
- Threefold Misery (1996, Lost & Found Records)
- A New Beat from a Dead Heart (2007, Deathwish Inc.)
- 18.61 (2010, Deathwish Inc.)

=== EPs ===
- Curse of Instinct (1996, Lost & Found Records)
- Serve & Defy (1997, Lost & Found Records)
- Oneoeight (2006, Self-Released)

=== Live albums ===
- "One Path for Me Through Destiny" (1997, Lost & Found Records)

=== Compilations ===
- Creation. Sustenance. Destruction. (2006, Equal Vision Records)

=== Compilation appearances ===
- You Deserve Even Worse (1994, Lost & Found Records)
- "Chord Magazine CD Sampler #10" (1995, Chord Recordings)
- "Hardcore - The Sound Of The Streets" (1995, Lost & Found Records)
- "Punk Rock Megaexplosion" (1995, Comforte)
- N.Y.H.C. Documentary Soundtrack (1996, SFT Records)
- Anti-Matter (1996, Another Planet Records)
- Violent World: A Tribute to the Misfits (1997, Caroline Records)
- "It Ain't Where You're From... It's Where You're At" (1997, Lost & Found Records)
- "46 Covertune Explosions" (1999, Lost & Found Records)
- "Equal Vision Records Label Sampler" (2000, Equal Vision Records)
- "Prisoners Of War: A Benefit For Peter Young" (2006, Direct Archtung)
- "Equal Vision Records Warped Tour '06 Summer Sampler" (2006, Equal Vision Records)
- "Winter Sampler 2K7/2K8" (2007, Deathwish, Malfunction Records)
- "Fall 2K8" (2008, Deathwish, Malfunction Records)
- "Hurry Up! Brasil - Seven Eight Life" (2008, Hurry Up Records, Seven Eight Life)
- "MMIX" (2009, Deathwish Inc.)
- "MMX" (2010), Deathwish Inc.)
- "One H.E.L.L. Of A Compilation" (2012, Get Stoked! Records)

=== Videos ===
- Curse of Instinct: 108's Final Tour (2000, Reflections Records)

=== Video Appearances ===
- "N.Y.H.C." (2008, Halo 8)
- "Spreading The Hardcore Reality" (Lost & Found Records)

=== Other releases ===
- "Spoken Words" (1991, self-released)
- "Demo 1992" (1992, self-released)
