= Gore (Deftones album) =

Studio album by Deftones
- Released: April 8, 2016
- Studio: Megawatt Recording (Studio City, California)
- Genres: Alternative metal; post-metal; experimental rock; space rock
- Length: 48:14
- Label: Reprise
- Producers: Matt Hyde; Deftones

Deftones chronology
Koi No Yokan (2012)	Gore (2016)	Ohms (2020)

Singles from Gore
- 1. "Prayers / Triangles" Released: February 4, 2016; 2. "Doomed User" Released: March 16, 2016; 3. "Hearts / Wires" Released: April 4, 2016; 4. "Phantom Bride" Released: June 7, 2016

Gore is the eighth studio album by the American alternative metal band Deftones, released on April 8, 2016, by Reprise Records. Its release was met with critical acclaim, debuting at number two on the US Billboard 200; it is the band's fifth album to debut within the chart's top-ten and is their highest-charting since their 2003 eponymous album.

The album was noted for its creative tension between frontman Chino Moreno and lead guitarist Stephen Carpenter, which was described by Rolling Stone as Moreno "playing Morrissey to the guitarist's Meshuggah".

== Background ==
=== Writing and recording ===
In March 2014, while Moreno was touring with his side project Crosses in support of their self-titled debut album, the rest of Deftones began writing a follow-up to 2012's Koi No Yokan. Deftones also previously reported that they intended to record a new album either in late 2014 or early 2015. In late February 2015, just after the band had finished the new album's drum tracks, Moreno told Rolling Stone that he expected to be done tracking the album by the end of March, and that Deftones had written 16 songs during the album's sessions. He described the album as "a little more of a heady record" than the previous album.

Carpenter expressed difficulty in getting into the feel of the album initially, comparing the feel of the song "Hearts / Wires" with being a serial killer. He stated, "I had to embrace my inner psycho rapist and come up with the part and get into it". Despite creative differences, band members noted the collaborative nature of the album and considered the tension between differences of musical styles to be a strength. For the most part, Carpenter was particularly uninvolved in the writing of Gore. Bassist Sergio Vega utilized a six-string bass when recording the new material, helping to push the band into new sonic territory. Jerry Cantrell of Alice in Chains provided guest guitar on the track "Phantom Bride".

On May 15, 2015, Moreno was interviewed by Kerrang! about the new album, which he described by saying, "The songs have a lot of different moods". He further explained that it was not a "happy record", but also "not a completely angry record".

=== Release ===
Initially the album was tentatively scheduled to be released on September 25, 2015, later being pushed back to late November, as final mixes as well as the title, cover and liner notes were still being completed. On October 26, 2015, drummer Abe Cunningham clarified that the band were still working on mixes, album art and song titles, and that the new album would be coming out in the first part of 2016. On January 22, 2016, during an interview held at the 2016 NAMM Show, Carpenter revealed the release date of the new album to be April 8, 2016.

On January 27, the band posted a 30-second teaser video to their website featuring new music from the album and confirming the album title as Gore.

The album's first single, "Prayers / Triangles", was released on February 4, 2016. The second single, "Doomed User", was shared on March 16. On April 4, the band released the third single from the album, "Hearts / Wires".

== Composition ==
Described as "having the marks of an experimental-rock gospel", Gore features the band's alternative metal sound meshed with a variety of influences from other genres. The music has been compared to the band's 2006 album, Saturday Night Wrist, with critics noting its experimental and atmospheric sound. Chuck Campbell of Knox News noted a post-metal sound on Gore, calling it "timelessly vital". Rob Sayce of Rock Sound noted that the band "drags their new wave and post-punk influences to the fore" on the record. Several critics also noted a space rock sound on the album.

== Cover art ==
Moreno explained that the juxtaposition between the photo of flying flamingos and the album title:

"I think Deftones have always flirted with dynamic and that yin-and-yang of things that are provocative and things that are beautiful. Where our last two album titles were a lot more optimistic, I think this title is intentionally different. This record is very different. I feel like Diamond Eyes and Koi No Yokan were brother-sister records in a lot of ways. They were both recording in the same way. And even though it was a tough few years we went through while making those records, I think it was important to have their optimistic outlook."

— Chino Moreno (2016)

== Reception ==
Professional ratings
Aggregate scores
Source	Rating
AnyDecentMusic?	7.6/10
Metacritic	81/100
Review scores
Source	Rating
AllMusic	3.5/5 stars
Classic Rock	4/5 stars
Consequence of Sound	A−
Exclaim!	8/10
Metal Hammer	4.5/5 stars
Metal Injection	8/10
Pitchfork	7.8/10
Q	4/5 stars
The Skinny	4/5 stars
Spin	7/10

=== Critical reception ===
According to the review aggregator Metacritic, Gore received "universal acclaim" based on a weighted average score of 81 out of 100 from 26 critic scores. In their April 2016 issue, Metal Hammer awarded the album 9 out of 10, claiming that "if, however, you delight in being challenged, coerced and invited on a journey of oblique emotional mysticism, then Gore is going to be one of your favourite albums of this year". AllMusic stated, "Not only have [Deftones] surpassed fates similar to other acts associated with the nu-metal genre, but they have continuously pushed the boundaries of what metal can be and how artistry can evolve. Gore is a triumphant reminder that a veteran act can continue to grow and still remain relevant". Writing for Exclaim!, Calum Slingerland called the record "an emotionally divided release" that will "continue to endear and swing with your own mood — however you're feeling". Reviewing for Spin, Andy O'Connor praised the use of Iron Maiden-like guitar work from Carpenter on "Phantom Bride" and "Pittura Infamante", calling them examples of the album's "experimental-rock gospel".

=== Accolades ===
Publication	Accolade	Rank
Consequence	Top 50 Albums of 2016	40
Exclaim!	Top 10 Metal & Hardcore Albums of 2016	7
Loudwire	20 Best Rock Albums of 2016	5
Metal Hammer	The 50 Best Metal Albums of 2016	14
OC Weekly	The 20 Best Metal Albums of 2016	6
Rolling Stone	20 Best Metal Albums of 2016	7
Sputnikmusic	Top 50 Albums of 2016	26

=== Commercial performance ===
Gore was initially expected to sell between 38,000 and 43,000 records in the US during its first week, and later, between 55,000 and 60,000, according to Hits Daily Double. The album sold 69,000 in traditional album sales in the US and debuted at No. 2 on the Billboard 200, making it their highest-charting album since their self-titled 2003 album and earning their highest sales since Saturday Night Wrist in 2006, which sold 76,000 copies in its first week.

Gore is also Deftones' first album to reach No. 1 in New Zealand and Australia.

== Track listing ==
All lyrics are written by Chino Moreno; all music is composed by Deftones (Stephen Carpenter, Abe Cunningham, Frank Delgado, Chino Moreno, Sergio Vega).

No.	Title	Length
1.	"Prayers / Triangles"	3:38
2.	"Acid Hologram"	4:06
3.	"Doomed User"	4:27
4.	"Geometric Headdress"	3:29
5.	"Hearts / Wires"	5:21
6.	"Pittura Infamante"	4:04
7.	"Xenon"	3:17
8.	"(L)MIRL"	5:02
9.	"Gore"	4:59
10.	"Phantom Bride"	4:53
11.	"Rubicon"	4:58
Total length:		48:14

== Personnel ==
Gore album personnel adapted from the CD liner notes, except where noted.

Deftones

- Chino Moreno − vocals, guitar
- Stephen Carpenter − guitar
- Sergio Vega (Note: Despite being credited as a member in the liner notes, Vega disputes his status as a full time member of the band, claiming that he was a member of the band only under contract.) − bass guitar
- Abe Cunningham − drums
- Frank Delgado − synthesizers, samples

Additional musicians

- Jerry Cantrell − guitar solo on "Phantom Bride"

Technical

- Matt Hyde − production, recording, engineering, mixing
- Deftones – production
- Chris Rakestraw − engineering
- Jimmy Fahey − assistant engineer
- Martin Pradler − additional engineering
- Rob Hill − additional engineering
- Howie Weinberg − mastering
- Gentry Studer − mastering
- Frank Maddocks − art direction, design, photography

== Charts ==
=== Weekly charts ===
Chart (2016)	Peak position
Australian Albums (ARIA)	1
Austrian Albums (Ö3 Austria)	7
Belgian Albums (Ultratop Flanders)	18
Belgian Albums (Ultratop Wallonia)	28
Canadian Albums (Billboard)	4
Dutch Albums (Album Top 100)	15
Finnish Albums (Suomen virallinen lista)	12
French Albums (SNEP)	19
German Albums (Offizielle Top 100)	7
Hungarian Albums (MAHASZ)	11
Irish Albums (IRMA)	17
Italian Albums (FIMI)	21
Japanese Albums (Oricon)	43
New Zealand Albums (RMNZ)	1
Norwegian Albums (VG-lista)	32
Polish Albums (ZPAV)	37
Portuguese Albums (AFP)	11
Scottish Albums (Official Charts)	4
Swedish Albums (Sverigetopplistan)	39
Swiss Albums (Schweizer Hitparade)	10
UK Albums (Official Charts)	5
US Billboard 200	2
US Top Rock Albums (Billboard)	2

=== Year-end charts ===
Chart (2016)	Position
US Top Rock Albums (Billboard)	26
