= Music of Batman: Arkham City =

Music from the video game Batman: Arkham City

Batman: Arkham City is a 2011 action-adventure video game based on the DC Comics superhero Batman. Two music albums were released alongside the game: Batman: Arkham City – Original Video Game Score which contains the game's original score by Nick Arundel and Ron Fish and Batman: Arkham City – The Album containing songs by various mainstream artists.

== Batman: Arkham City – Original Video Game Score ==
Batman: Arkham City – Original Video Game Score

Film score by Nick Arundel and Ron Fish
- Released: October 18, 2011
- Genre: Soundtrack
- Length: 52:50
- Label: WaterTower Music

The Batman: Arkham City – Original Video Game Score was released on October 18, 2011, by WaterTower Music. The album features 19 tracks composed for the game. Ron Fish and Nick Arundel, composers for Batman: Arkham Asylum, returned to write music for Arkham City.

No.	Title	Contributing artist(s)	Length
1.	"Arkham City Main Theme"	Nick Arundel	2:47
2.	"Sorry, Boys"	Nick Arundel	1:49
3.	"A Monument to Your Failure"	Ron Fish	1:56
4.	"Have You Got My Location"	Nick Arundel	4:20
5.	"This Court Is Now in Session"	Nick Arundel	2:16
6.	"It Was The Joker"	Nick Arundel	2:19
7.	"I Think You Should Do as He Says"	Nick Arundel	2:35
8.	"Refusal Will Not Be Tolerated"	Nick Arundel	2:44
9.	"Wham! Gotcha!"	Nick Arundel	3:29
10.	"Let's Hear Him Squeal"	Nick Arundel	3:01
11.	"I Know What You Guys Are Thinking"	Nick Arundel	3:34
12.	"It's Initiation Time"	Nick Arundel	1:59
13.	"What's He Doing Here?"	Nick Arundel	2:14
14.	"How Does It Feel, Pig?"	Nick Arundel	2:19
15.	"Call Him Off"	Nick Arundel	4:36
16.	"You Should Have Listened to My Warning"	Nick Arundel	2:10
17.	"You Need to Think This Through"	Nick Arundel	2:43
18.	"Bring Her Back to Me"	Ron Fish	2:08
19.	"It's Not Even Breakfast"	Nick Arundel & Ron Fish	3:51
Total length:			52:50

== Batman: Arkham City – The Album ==
Batman: Arkham City – The Album

Soundtrack album by various artists
- Released: October 4, 2011
- Genre: Alternative rock
- Label: WaterTower Music
- Producer: Rishi Shah, John Feldmann, Chris Bittner, Claudio Sanchez, Michael Birnbaum, Toby Butler, Black Rebel Motorcycle Club, Blaqk Audio, Sune Rose Wagner, Shaun Lopez, †††, Rob Caggiano, Howard Benson, The Boxer Rebellion, Serj Tankian

To accompany the original score, WaterTower Music also published Batman: Arkham City – The Album, featuring musical contributions to the franchise by various artists. The album was digitally released worldwide on October 4, 2011, via major electronic retailers iTunes and Amazon MP3. The iTunes deluxe edition included a portion of Arundel & Fish's original video game score 14 days before its standalone release. A physical audio CD release accompanied the digital version. The Batman: Arkham City Collector's Edition is also to include The Album via digital redemption, featuring an additional exclusive track. All 11 tracks were included on CD from retailer Best Buy.

On their contribution to the album, Claudio Sanchez from Coheed and Cambria said "I write in a very conceptual format with the stories that surround Coheed and Cambria, but Batman has a much larger, defined history and rules that go along with it" and that "my goal was to find universal themes from Batman's existing history to help give the lyrics legs and dimension so that the song could live within that world". Panic! at the Disco's involvement with the album was publicised on their website on September 22, 2011, with the announcement of their track "Mercenary".

Professional ratings
Review scores
Source	Rating
IGN	(7/10)
Alternative Press	3/5 stars
Seattle PI	1.5/3 stars
Some Kind of Awesome	3/5 stars

No.	Title	Writer(s)	Producer(s)	Length
1.	"Mercenary" (performed by Panic! at the Disco)	Brendon Urie; Spencer Smith	John Feldmann	2:41
2.	"Deranged" (performed by Coheed and Cambria)	Claudio Sanchez	Claudio Sanchez; Michael Birnbaum (co.); Chris Bittner (co.)	4:26
3.	"Creature" (performed by The Duke Spirit)	Toby Butler; Liela Moss	Toby Butler	2:32
4.	"Shadow on the Run" (performed by Black Rebel Motorcycle Club)	Black Rebel Motorcycle Club	Black Rebel Motorcycle Club	4:48
5.	"Afterdark" (performed by Blaqk Audio)	Blaqk Audio	Blaqk Audio	4:26
6.	"Oh, Stranger" (performed by The Raveonettes)	Sune Rose Wagner	Sune Rose Wagner	3:19
7.	"The Years" (performed by †††)	Chino Moreno; Shaun Lopez; Chuck Doom	Shaun Lopez; †††	4:01
8.	"Trophy Widow" (performed by The Damned Things)	Joe Trohman; Keith Buckley; Rob Caggiano	Rob Caggiano; Joe Trohman (co.)	3:45
9.	"Drown in You" (performed by Daughtry)	Chris Daughtry; Marti Frederiksen	Howard Benson	4:22
10.	"Losing You" (performed by The Boxer Rebellion)	Adam Harrison; Piers Hewitt; Todd Howe; Nathan Nicholson	The Boxer Rebellion	3:34
11.	"Total Paranoia" (performed by Serj Tankian)	Serj Tankian (music); Steven Sater (lyrics)	Serj Tankian	2:56

Collector's edition bonus track
No.	Title	Length
12.	"In the Shadow" (performed by A Place to Bury Strangers)	3:10

iTunes deluxe edition bonus tracks (from the Original Video Game Score by Nick Arundel)
No.	Title	Length
12.	"Arkham City Main Theme"	2:47
13.	"This Court Is Now in Session"	2:16
14.	"I Think You Should Do as He Says"	2:35
15.	"I Know What You Guys Are Thinking"	3:34
16.	"Call Him Off"	4:36
17.	"You Should Have Listened to My Warning"	2:10
