= Initiation / Protection =

"Initiation" / "Protection"

Single by Crosses
- Released: March 18, 2022
- Length: 7:54
- Label: Warner Records
- Songwriters: Shaun Lopez, Chino Moreno
- Producers: Shaun Lopez, Crosses

Crosses singles chronology
"Goodbye Horses" (2021)	"Initiation" / "Protection" (2022)	""Day One" / "Vivien"" (2022)

"Initiation" / "Protection" is a single by the American musical group Crosses. The digital single was released on March 18, 2022 through Warner Records, with a vinyl version released shortly after. The single represents the band's first release with newly written material since their 2014 self-titled debut album.

== Background and recording ==
The release of "Initiation" / "Protection" marks an eight-year gap between new material, Crosses' previous release was their 2014 self-titled debut. When the group reformed, they recorded a large pool of music to choose from and selected "Initiation" and "Protection" as the first songs to release because they represented the wide range of sounds from their new direction. Shaun Lopez elaborated: "We couldn't just put out one song, because there are so many different moods and vibes to what we've been working on and we just want to show everything. We want to show our different sides and these two songs are quite different from one another." The song "Initiation" was described by Crosses as, "a soundtrack for uncertain times".

== Music videos ==
Both "Initiation" and "Protection" had their own promotional music videos. The video for "Initiation" was directed by Lorenzo Diego Carrera and was influenced by the 1983 film Scarface. Appearing in the video is model Thais Molon, who was previous featured in the band's videos for "Bitches Brew" and "Epilogue". The song "Protection" initially had a visualizer featuring a behind-the-scenes look at the photo shoot for the album's cover art, and later received a proper music video that was inspired by the 1973 film The Exorcist.

== Track listing ==
All songs written by Shaun Lopez and Chino Moreno.

1. "Initiation" – 4:05
2. "Protection" – 3:49
