= Permanent Radiant =

EP by Crosses
- Released: December 9, 2022
- Length: 22:52
- Label: Warner
- Producer: Shaun Lopez, Crosses

Crosses chronology
Crosses (2014)	Permanent Radiant (2022)	Goodnight, God Bless, I Love U, Delete. (2023)

Singles from Permanent Radiant
- 1. "Day One" / "Vivien" Released: October 28, 2022; 2. "Sensation" Released: November 18, 2022

Permanent Radiant (stylized as PERMANENT.RADIANT) is an EP by the American music group Crosses. The EP was released on December 9, 2022 through Warner Records. The band promoted the EP with music videos for the songs "Vivien", "Sensation", and "Holier". At the time of release, Crosses described the release as a precursor to a full-length album to be released at a later date.

== Background and recording ==
Crosses, which formed with Shaun Lopez, Chino Moreno and Chuck Doom, became inactive in 2015 after the supporting tours for their self-titled debut album. In the early 2020s, Lopez and Moreno revived Crosses and began writing and recording new music. Part of the reason for the eight-year gap between major releases was the fracturing relationship between Doom and the other members of Crosses. Another reason for the eight-year gap between major releases was proximity. During the group's early days, Lopez and Moreno lived down the street from each other in Los Angeles. For this new material, Lopez was traveling to Oregon to collaborate with Moreno in his home studio. Moreno was particularly interested in returning to Crosses because his main band Deftones had just released Ohms but its supporting tour was on hold indefinitely due to the COVID-19 pandemic. By the time of release for Permanent Radiant, Moreno estimated the duo had more than 20 songs in various stages of development, and that the songs they chose for Permanent Radiant represented the "safer" choices that most closely resembled the band's earlier material. Moreno elaborated: "We wanted to put something out to sort of solidify the return of the group without going too far from the foundation we created in the beginning."

After releasing a stand-alone digital single covering Cause and Effect's "The Beginning of the End" in 2020 and a stand-alone digital single covering Q Lazzarus' "Goodbye Horses" in 2021, Crosses officially announced they signed to Warner Records and were working on new material. Their first new release under Warner was the double single "Initiation"/"Protection" in March 2022 and Permanent Radiant was formally announced in October 2022. The band's strategy was to slowly release new singles that would eventually lead to a new full-length album.

== Promotion ==
Crosses began promoting Permanent Radiant with a digital single for the song "Vivien" and a corresponding music video on October 28, 2022. The band has stated that the lyrics to "Vivien" are "a slight wink" to the 1998 Britney Spears song, "...Baby One More Time". On November 18, 2022, Crosses released a digital single for the EP's opening track "Sensation" along with a corresponding music video. On the EP's release date, Crosses released a third and final music video for "Holier". All three music videos for Permanent Radiant feature an unnamed female protagonist played by actress Thais Molon as she goes on, what Revolver magazine describes as, "surreal, Lynch-ian misadventures."

== Reception ==
Kerrang! writer Nick Ruskell gave the EP a 4/5 rating praising the depth and atmosphere found on the songs, elaborating: Permanent Radiant, the band's first output in eight years, finds them with creative juice at full flow, even now operating as a two-piece following a split from Chuck. Once again, this is music for solitude, for headphones, for the night."

== Track listing ==
All tracks are written by Chino Moreno and Shaun Lopez, except where noted.

No.	Title	Writer(s)	Length
1.	"Sensation"		4:36
2.	"Vivien"		3:53
3.	"Cadavre Exquis"	Moreno; Lopez; Jono Evans	2:59
4.	"Day One"		3:40
5.	"Holier"		3:47
6.	"Procession"		3:55

== Charts ==
Chart performance for Permanent Radiant
Chart (2023)	Peak position
Hungarian Albums (MAHASZ)	31
