= B-Sides & Rarities (Deftones album) =

Compilation album by Deftones
- Released: October 4, 2005
- Recorded: 1995–2005
- Genre: Alternative rock; alternative metal; experimental rock; nu metal
- Length: 64:26
- Label: Rhino/Maverick
- Producer: Terry Date and Deftones

Deftones chronology
| Deftones (2003) | B-Sides & Rarities (2005) | Saturday Night Wrist (2006) |

B-Sides & Rarities is a compilation album by alternative metal band Deftones, consisting of a CD and a DVD. The CD compiled previously released and unreleased B-sides, while the DVD featured multimedia content, including a complete videography. It was released in 2005 by Maverick Records.

== Reception ==
Professional ratings
Review scores
| Source | Rating |
|---|---|
| AbsolutePunk | (86%) |
| AllMusic | 3.5/5 stars |
| Drowned in Sound | 6/10 |
| Kerrang! | 4/5 stars |
| Stylus Magazine | 3.5/5 stars |

"B-Sides and Rarities is an overall resounding effort by perhaps the smartest members of the now moribund Nü-Metal genre", said Ayo Jegede of Stylus Magazine. He went on to say, "Each of these B-sides and alternates replicates a period in their career, so while the songs themselves may be new, they perfectly encapsulate each album of the band’s catalogue as though they were overarching epochs".

== Track listing ==
=== CD ===
| No. | Title | Writer(s) | Length |
|---|---|---|---|
| 1. | "Savory" (Jawbox cover, featuring Jonah Matranga, Shaun Lopez and Chris Robyn of Far) | William Barbot; Zachary Barocas; Kim Coletta; James Robbins | 4:37 |
| 2. | "Wax and Wane" (Cocteau Twins cover) | Cocteau Twins | 4:09 |
| 3. | "Change (In the House of Flies) (Acoustic)" | Deftones | 5:16 |
| 4. | "Simple Man" (Lynyrd Skynyrd cover) | Gary Rossington; Ronnie Van Zant | 6:20 |
| 5. | "Sinatra" (2005 remix of Helmet cover) | Page Hamilton; Helmet | 4:43 |
| 6. | "No Ordinary Love" (Sade cover, featuring Jonah Matranga of Far) | Sade Adu; Stuart Matthewman | 5:34 |
| 7. | "Teenager (Idiot Version)" (featuring Michael Harris and Daniel Anderson of Idiot Pilot) | Deftones | 3:45 |
| 8. | "Crenshaw Punch/I'll Throw Rocks at You" | Deftones | 4:49 |
| 9. | "Black Moon" (featuring B-Real of Cypress Hill) | Deftones | 3:18 |
| 10. | "If Only Tonight We Could Sleep" (The Cure cover, live in 2004 at MTV Icon: The Cure) | Simon Gallup; Robert Smith; Pearl Thompson; Lol Tolhurst; Boris Williams | 5:05 |
| 11. | "Please, Please, Please Let Me Get What I Want" (The Smiths cover) | Morrissey; Johnny Marr | 2:04 |
| 12. | "Digital Bath (Acoustic)" (live in 2000 at KXTE, Las Vegas, Nevada) | Deftones | 4:48 |
| 13. | "The Chauffeur" (Duran Duran cover) | Duran Duran | 5:21 |
| 14. | "Be Quiet and Drive (Far Away) (Acoustic)" (additional vocals by Jonah Matranga of Far) | Deftones | 4:32 |
| Total length: | | | 64:26 |

iTunes bonus track
| No. | Title | Writer(s) | Length |
|---|---|---|---|
| 15. | "Night Boat" (Duran Duran cover) | Duran Duran | 4:38 |

=== DVD ===
1. "7 Words"
2. "Bored"
3. "My Own Summer (Shove It)"
4. "Be Quiet and Drive (Far Away)"
5. "Change (In the House of Flies)"
6. "Back to School (Mini Maggit)"
7. "Digital Bath"
8. "Minerva"
9. "Hexagram"
10. "Bloody Cape"
11. "Engine Number 9"
12. "Root"

== Personnel ==
=== Deftones ===
- Deftones – producer, compilation producer
  - Chino Moreno – vocals
  - Stephen Carpenter – guitar; photography
  - Frank Delgado – keyboards; photography
  - Chi Cheng – bass
  - Abe Cunningham – drums; photography

=== Additional personnel ===
- Dave Aaron – engineer, mixing
- Karen Ahmed – project supervisor
- Tom Baker – remastering
- Andy Bennett – video director
- Chris Burns – video director
- Terry Date – producer, engineer, mixing, remixing
- Darren Doane – video director
- Mike Donk – photography
- Nick Egan – video director
- Mike Engstrom – project manager
- Sharyl Farber – project assistant
- Paul Fedor – video director
- Joe Fraulob – guitar, engineer, soloist, mixing
- Jay Goin – assistant
- Patrick Haley – photography
- Sam Hofstedt – assistant
- Paul Hunter – video director
- Joe Johnston – engineer, mixing
- Dean Karr – video director
- Nick Lambrou – video editor
- Nick Lambrou – DVD editor
- Frank Maddocks – creative director, creative design
- Jonah Sonz Matranga – vocals
- James Minchin – photography, video director
- Scott Olson – guitar
- Purge – video director
- Esther Somlo – project supervisor
- Dorothy Stefanski – project assistant
- Eric Steinman – engineer
- Robbie Snow – project manager
- Brian Virtue – producer, engineer, mixing
- Amy Weiser – photography
- Ulrich Wild – assistant
- Steve Woolard – project assistant
- Russ Busby – videographer, video editor, video director

== Charts ==
| Chart (2005) | Peak position |
|---|---|
| Australian Albums (ARIA) | 30 |
| Austrian Albums (Ö3 Austria) | 54 |
| Belgian Albums (Ultratop Wallonia) | 84 |
| French Albums (SNEP) | 59 |
| German Albums (Offizielle Top 100) | 85 |
| Hungarian Physical Albums (MAHASZ) | 15 |
| Swiss Albums (Schweizer Hitparade) | 93 |
| UK Albums (OCC) | 100 |
| UK Rock & Metal Albums (OCC) | 5 |
| US Billboard 200 | 43 |
| US Top Hard Rock Albums (Billboard) | 18 |

== Certifications ==
| Region | Certification | Certified units/sales |
|---|---|---|
| United Kingdom (BPI) | Silver | 60,000^{‡} |
^{‡} Sales+streaming figures based on certification alone.
