= We Are in This Alone =

Studio album by The Revolution Smile
- Released: May 8, 2002
- Genres: Alternative metal; nu metal; post-grunge
- Length: 51:22
- Labels: Flawless; Geffen
- Producer: Shaun Lopez

The Revolution Smile chronology
At War with Plastic (2000)	We Are in This Alone (2002)	Above the Noise (2003)

We Are in This Alone is the debut studio album by American rock band The Revolution Smile and released in 2002.

== Background ==
Originally intended for release by Buddyhead Records, the band was signed by Flawless Records mid-way through production. Flawless produced a few thousand copies which the band offered for free on its website. Many of the tracks were later reworked and remastered for their 2003 release, Above the Noise.

== Track listing ==
All tracks are written by Shaun Lopez, except where noted.

No.	Title	Writer(s)	Length
1.	"The Gift"	Tim McCord, Lopez	4:01
2.	"Payday"		4:15
3.	"New Light"		3:29
4.	"Indiana Feeling"		3:01
5.	"Gun"		3:47
6.	"The Future of an End"	Jeremy White	6:37
7.	"Cadillac Ass"		3:50
8.	"Looking Down the Barrel"		3:38
9.	"Ready for the World"		4:34
10.	"Orange"		8:55
11.	"I Wish I"		5:15

== Personnel ==
- Shaun Lopez – vocals, rhythm guitar
- Tim McCord – lead guitar
- Octavio Gallardo – bass guitar
- Jeremy White – drums
