= Goodnight, God Bless, I Love U, Delete. =

Studio album by Crosses
- Released: October 13, 2023
- Length: 49:49
- Label: Warner
- Producer: Crosses; Dawn Golden; Nate Donmoyer; Away

Crosses chronology
Permanent Radiant (2022)	Goodnight, God Bless, I Love U, Delete. (2023)

Singles from Goodnight, God Bless, I Love U, Delete.
- 1. "Invisible Hand" Released: August 4, 2023; 2. "Light as a Feather" / "Ghost Ride" Released: September 15, 2023; 3. "Big Youth" Released: October 12, 2023

Goodnight, God Bless, I Love U, Delete. is the second studio album by American musical group Crosses, a side project of Deftones singer Chino Moreno and Far guitarist Shaun Lopez. The album was released on October 13, 2023, by Warner Records. It is their first full-length album in nine years since their self-titled debut from 2014. The album was produced by the duo, with additional production by Dawn Golden, Nate Donmoyer, and Away, and features vocal contributions from El-P and Robert Smith.

== Background and release ==
Crosses formed in 2011 and released a series of EPs leading up to their self-titled debut album which was released by Sumerian Records on February 11, 2014. After a seven-year gap, the band announced they had signed a worldwide deal with Warner Records. That deal led to the release of the Permanent Radiant EP on December 9, 2022.

In March 2023, Lopez shared videos to Instagram appearing to show him and Moreno recording in a studio. On June 20, the lineup for the music festival Darker Waves was announced, including Crosses for what was their first live performance since 2014, set for November 18 in Huntington Beach, California. On August 2, Moreno posted two videos to social media, one featuring him and Lopez in a studio and the other showing someone dragging a bouquet of roses around by a chain.

The album was announced on August 4, with a release date of October 13. The album was released by Warner Records, and is the band's first album with a major label. The lead single, "Invisible Hand", was released the same day with a music video. On September 15, two more singles, "Light as a Feather" and "Ghost Ride", were released, with a music video for the former. The fourth single, "Big Youth" featuring El-P, was released on October 12, and was later announced to be included on the soundtrack for EA Sports UFC 5.

Per Moreno, most of the album's name came from "something that came from my childhood, something that me, my brothers and sister, and our parents – our whole family – always said to each other every night before we went to bed. When I hear that phrase it just reminds me of my childhood – it was a constant. It gives me this feeling of comfort", and the "Delete" part was to signify "[the idea that] one moment you have everything, and then – delete – it's over."

== Recording ==
The album was made over a four-year period, with some songs coming from early in the process and others being finished the last day they recorded. The original intent was to release all the songs in batches as EPs, including Permanent Radiant, and then collect them all together into one full album after, but the duo hit a creative streak and finished more songs more quickly than expected and decided they all fit together as one album on their own. They had made enough for a double album, but pared it down to 15 tracks.

== Reception ==
Goodnight, God Bless, I Love U, Delete. ratings
Aggregate scores
Source	Rating
Metacritic	72/100
Review scores
Source	Rating
AllMusic	4/5 stars
Clash	8/10
Classic Rock	7/10
Distorted Sound	7/10
Dork	4/5 stars
The Line of Best Fit	7/10
Metal Hammer	8/10
Mojo	3/5 stars
The Skinny	3/5 stars

According to the review aggregator Metacritic, Goodnight, God Bless, I Love U, Delete. received "generally favorable reviews" based on a weighted average score of 72 out of 100 from 6 critic scores.

=== Year-end lists ===
Goodnight, God Bless, I Love U, Delete. on year-end lists
Publication	#	Ref.
Revolver	3	

== Track listing ==
All tracks are written by Crosses with additional writers listed below. All tracks are produced by Crosses with additional producers listed below.

Goodnight, God Bless, I Love U, Delete. track listing
No.	Title	Writer(s)	Producers	Length
1.	"Pleasure"			4:16
2.	"Invisible Hand"			3:54
3.	"Found"	Dexter Tortoriello	Dawn Golden	3:26
4.	"Light as a Feather"			3:10
5.	"Pulseplagg"	Nate Donmoyer	Donmoyer	2:33
6.	"Runner"			3:44
7.	"Big Youth" (featuring El-P)	El-P		3:04
8.	"End Youth (Reprise)"			1:39
9.	"Last Rites"			3:42
10.	"Ghost Ride"	Daniel Alm	Away	4:11
11.	"Grace"			3:10
12.	"Eraser"			2:17
13.	"Natural Selection"			2:48
14.	"Girls Float † Boys Cry" (featuring Robert Smith)	Jono Evans		4:26
15.	"Goodnight, God Bless, I Love U, Delete."			3:29
Total length:				49:49

== Personnel ==
=== Crosses ===
- Chino Moreno – producer, lead vocals (1–7, 9–15), synthesizer (1, 15), bass guitar (13)
- Shaun Lopez – producer, drum programming, guitar, synthesizer, audio engineering, vocal producer (1–7, 9–15), harmony vocals (3, 4, 6, 10, 11, 14, 15), bass guitar (4), lap steel guitar (4, 11), lead vocals (13)

=== Additional musicians ===
- Dexter Tortoriello – drum programming and synthesizer (3), audio engineering (3)
- Rizz – harmony vocals (3), additional vocals (5)
- Nate Donmoyer – drum programming and synthesizer (5)
- El-P – vocals (7)
- Daniel Alm – drum programming and synthesizer (10)
- Clemente Ruiz – additional drums (11)
- Robert Smith – vocals (14)
- Jono Evans – guitar (14)

=== Technical ===
- Clint Gibbs – mixing
- Eric Broyhill – mastering
- Dexter Tortoriello – audio engineering (3)
- Nate Donmoyer – audio engineering (5)
- Daniel Alm – audio engineering (10)
- Robert Smith – audio engineering (14)

== Charts ==
Chart performance for Goodnight, God Bless, I Love U, Delete.
Chart (2023)	Peak position
Australian Digital Albums (ARIA)	18
French Albums (SNEP)	197
German Albums (Offizielle Top 100)	59
Hungarian Physical Albums (MAHASZ)	11
Scottish Albums (OCC)	57
UK Album Downloads (OCC)	37
US Billboard 200	139
