= Ceremony (Deftones song) =

- Promotional poster art for the "Ceremony" music video, one of two created by Frank Maddocks.

Single by Deftones

from the album Ohms
- Released: January 26, 2021
- Length: 3:27
- Label: Reprise
- Composers: Chino Moreno; Stephen Carpenter; Sergio Vega; Frank Delgado; Abe Cunningham
- Lyricist: Chino Moreno
- Producers: Terry Date; Deftones

Deftones singles chronology
"Genesis" (2020)	"Ceremony" (2021)	"My Mind Is a Mountain" (2025)

Music video
- "Ceremony" on YouTube

Alternative cover
- Digital cover art for the official remix by WHOKILLEDXIX

Official visualizer
- "Ceremony" (WHOKILLEDXIX Ceremonial Version) on YouTube

"Ceremony" is a song by the American alternative metal band Deftones from their ninth studio album, Ohms (2020). The song impacted US rock radio on January 26, 2021, making it the third single from the album. Musically, the track has been described as featuring distorted and palm-muted guitar with "pneumatically pulverizing" riffs, supported by dub-inspired drums and a shifting vocal performance from the frontman Chino Moreno. "Ceremony" peaked at number nine on Billboard's Mainstream Rock chart. A music video for the song, directed by the filmmaker Leigh Whannell and starring the actress Cleopatra Coleman, was released on April 21, 2021, and received attention for its dark, cinematic style.

== Background and composition ==
In a September 2020 interview on BBC Radio 1's Rock Show with Daniel P. Carter, the vocalist Chino Moreno explained that "Ceremony" was among the first songs written for Ohms (2020). He described its development as emerging from a jam session, with band members reacting to one another until the piece began to take shape. Moreno added that he felt a strong connection to the track, noting that while he considered its overall atmosphere and musical character to be special within the album, the lyrics were "pretty dark" and difficult for him to discuss in detail.

"Ceremony" has been described as combining heavy instrumentation with atmospheric detail. Joseph Schafer of Consequence noted its use of distorted and palm-muted guitar, while NME's James McMahon characterized its guitar part as "pneumatically pulverizing". In Louder Than War, Paul Grace highlighted the song's saturated riffs and dub-inspired drums, alongside a chord change that underpins what it called a dreamy vocal delivery. Neil Z. Yeung in AllMusic observed that the track "twists and turns through haunted vocal harmony and a visceral groove". Vocally, Moreno's performance was described by Dave Everley of Classic Rock as shifting between whispers and digital screams, while No Ripcord writer Juan Edgardo Rodríguez referred to his "whispered scream" layered over bellowing guitars, framing the track as both pulverizing and compositionally nuanced.

== Release ==
"Ceremony" impacted US rock radio on January 26, 2021, making it the third single from Ohms. (Note: Some sources treat the release of the "Ceremony" music video as the song's single release.) In promotion for the song, a playthrough video featuring the guitarist Stephen Carpenter performing the song on electric guitar was released in April 2021. "Ceremony" peaked at number nine on the Billboard Mainstream Rock chart and reached number 26 on the Rock & Alternative Airplay chart.

=== Official remix ===
An official remix of "Ceremony" was created by the hyperpunk duo WHOKILLEDXIX and released by Reprise Records on June 4, 2021. According to John Hill of Revolver, Deftones approached the group to reinterpret the track, which they transformed from what Hill called a "slow-burning number" into a chaotic and aggressive version that used Moreno's vocals as an additional texture. In an interview, the members Yung Skayda and Karm the Tool described the process as challenging, explaining that their high-energy style initially clashed with the slower pace of the original song. Karm recounted that after several unsuccessful attempts, the duo decided to embrace their own approach during a studio session, ultimately producing the final version over the course of a month.

== Music video ==
The music video for "Ceremony" was directed by the filmmaker Leigh Whannell. The collaboration developed after Whannell expressed his appreciation for the band on Twitter, which led to direct contact between the two parties. Moreno explained that once they connected online, the video came together quickly and in a collaborative manner. Whannell stated that he had been a fan of Deftones for over two decades and described the opportunity to contribute to their visual output as a "dream come true". Whannell also mentioned that the invitation came shortly after he tweeted about enjoying Ohms, which prompted the band's management to approach him about directing. The video was announced on April 19, 2021, and released on April 21.

The video features the actress Cleopatra Coleman navigating a sequence of secretive bars and clubs, each with increasingly unusual entry requirements. These escalate from offering a personal secret to producing an artifact, and eventually to threatening a bouncer with a knife. Members of Deftones appear throughout the narrative as figures controlling access to different rooms. As Coleman's character advances, the setting shifts from a lavish cocktail party to more unsettling and dangerous environments. After the last stop, she walks down a hallway lined with visibly upset individuals before arriving at a final room, where Moreno ushers her inside. There, an elderly woman whispers something to her that is inaudible to the viewer, prompting her to leave in tears and collapse in the corridor.

Critics emphasized the video's dark, cinematic qualities. Revolver pointed to the involvement of "serious Hollywood talent", while Chad Childers of Loudwire remarked that a collaboration between Whannell and Deftones naturally yielded something "dark and twisted". Consequence's Jon Hadusek described the result as a compact psychological thriller that builds tension within the span of the song, and Metal Hammer writer Fraser Lewry noted that the clip is designed to instill a growing sense of dread in viewers.

== Charts ==
Chart performance for "Ceremony"
Chart (2021)	Peak position
US Mainstream Rock (Billboard)	9
US Rock & Alternative Airplay (Billboard)	26
