= Droid (album) =

Studio album by Droid
- Released: July 10, 2007
- Recorded: 2006/2007 @ Henson, Paramount, and Elementree Studios Hollywood, CA. Engineered by Tim Harkins
- Genre: Groove metal, metalcore
- Length: 46:02
- Label: Emotional Syphon Records
- Producer: Tim Harkins

Droid chronology
Swallow the Cure (2006)	Droid (2007)

Professional ratings
Review scores
Source	Rating
AllMusic	3.5/5 stars
Blabbermouth.net	7/10 stars

Droid is the debut album from groove metal band Droid. Released on James "Munky" Shaffer's independent record label Emotional Syphon Records it features guest vocals from Deftones frontman Chino Moreno.

== Track listing ==
1. "The Resurrection" - 4:44
2. "Fueled by Hate" - 3:53
3. "God of Anger" - 4:47
4. "Built to Last" - 3:52
5. "No Gods No Masters" - 3:23
6. "Withdrawals of Me" - 4:08
7. "Vengeance Is Mine" (feat. Chino Moreno) - 3:52
8. "For the Following" - 2:35
9. "Behind Dead Eyes" - 3:31
10. "Salt the Graves" - 3:33
11. "Together We Die" - 3:48
12. "My Oath" - 3:56
