= The Revolution Smile =

American band

- Origin: Sacramento, California, U.S.
- Genres: Alternative metal; hard rock; post-grunge; nu metal
- Years active: 2000–2006
- Labels: Buddyhead; Flawless; Geffen; Animation Records
- Past members: Shaun Lopez; Octavio Gallardo; Tim McCord; Jeremy White; Stephen Hoke

The Revolution Smile was an American rock band from Sacramento, California.

== History ==
The band was formed in 2000 by former Far guitarist Shaun Lopez after he had been set to join an early version of Rival Schools headed by former Quicksand frontman, Walter Schreifels, and after he auditioned for various bands, including the Foo Fighters.

In 2001, The Revolution Smile released At War with Plastic, a six-song EP produced by Shaun, on Animation Records, with worldwide distribution. By 2001, The Revolution Smile solidified its first lineup which consisted of Octavio Gallardo on bass, Tim McCord on guitar, and Jeremy White on drums. They began working on their follow up to At War With Plastic that summer. Once again engineered, mixed, and produced by Shaun Lopez. We Are In This Alone was finished in the fall of 2001 and the band planned to release it soon after.

In January 2002, We Are In This Alone landed in the hands of Geffen records, and they signed the band. Geffen planned to remix and release We Are In This Alone, but the band wanted to make a new record. Anyway, Geffen remixed the album (discarding New Light), with Bonetrower, Alien, and The Ride of Los Angeles being the only new songs.

In July 2002, The band recorded Above The Noise with Dave Sardy and Shaun Lopez, co-producing. In January 2003, Andy Wallace mixed Above the Noise, and the band launched national tours in support of the album, playing alongside Deftones, Dredg, The Music, Marilyn Manson, Korn, and many others.

September 2003, The Revolution Smile toured Europe with Deftones and A Perfect Circle. They were also musical guests on Jimmy Kimmel Live!. Shortly thereafter, Jeremy White and Tim parted ways with the band. Jeremy White was replaced by Stephen Hoke, and the band became a three piece.

In January 2004, the band asked to be released from their recording contract.

In July 2004, the band played The Warped Tour where they shared the stage with My Chemical Romance, Rise Against, Atmosphere, and From Autumn To Ashes. In June 2005, the band finished Summer Ever, which was also recorded and produced by Shaun Lopez.

Shaun then took time off to produce and record other bands. He recorded bands such as Giant Drag, and Deftones fifth album Saturday Night Wrist.

In August 2006, it was announced on Indie 103.1 that Summer Ever will receive a September 5, 2006 release on Animation Records.

The Revolution Smile has received national and international press in such publications as Spin, Revolver, Kerrang!, Alternative Press, Guitar Player, Rolling Stone online, and Q magazine called Shaun Lopez "one of the most influential guitar players of his generation".

After leaving the band, guitarist Tim McCord went on be the bass player for the rock band Evanescence.

Their song “Bonethrower” from their 2004 album Above The Noise was featured in the soundtrack for Tiger Woods PGA Tour 2004. The band performed this song on Jimmy Kimmel Live in 2003.

== Discography ==
- At War with Plastic - 2000
- We Are in This Alone - 2002
- Above the Noise - 2003
- Summer Ever - 2006
