= Saturday Night Wrist =

2006 studio album by Deftones

Studio album by Deftones
- Released: October 31, 2006
- Recorded: November 2004 – April 2006
- Studios: Carriage House (Stamford, Connecticut); The Spot (Sacramento, California); The Hangar (Sacramento); The Airport (Burbank, California); Morning View House (Malibu, California)
- Length: 51:40
- Label: Maverick
- Producers: Bob Ezrin; Deftones

Deftones chronology
B-Sides & Rarities (2005)	Saturday Night Wrist (2006)	Diamond Eyes (2010)

Singles from Saturday Night Wrist
- 1. "Hole in the Earth" Released: September 12, 2006; 2. "Mein" Released: March 13, 2007

Saturday Night Wrist is the fifth studio album by the American alternative metal band Deftones, released on October 31, 2006, by Maverick Records. Despite early contributions that were later scrapped, it marked the departure of Terry Date, who had produced the band's first four albums. It was also the last Deftones album to feature bassist Chi Cheng after he was involved in a serious car accident in 2008, which put him in a coma and led to his death five years later. It is also their last to be released through Maverick.

Saturday Night Wrist was the product of an arduous and stressful creative process lasting roughly two years and straining relationships within the band. Inspiration for the album was also largely influenced by singer Chino Moreno's drug addictions and his failing marriage. As such, he ranks it as his least favorite Deftones album. The album was met with praise from fans and critics, with some of the latter applauding it in relation to the band's self-titled effort.

== Background ==
=== Early writing and recording ===
In early 2004, Maverick Records informed the band they were obligated to begin writing for another record due to the commercial failure and underwhelming reception of the band’s 2003 self-titled record. They began pioneering ideas for a new album at their studio, The Spot, in Sacramento, California. On April 30, 2004, they announced they would be relocating to Malibu, California, to continue writing the album at Morning View House. Deftones spent most of the summer there, resulting in an album's worth of material that the singer Chino Moreno described as "straight evil music".

They then began searching for a producer and started recording. They initially considered enlisting Ken Andrews of Failure and Ric Ocasek of the Cars, but to no avail. They then worked with Dan the Automator for about a week. According to guitarist Stephen Carpenter during collaboration with Dan, Deftones seemed to be pursuing the "more technical", math metal-based elements of the band's sound. After some deliberation, however, Moreno and the drummer Abe Cunningham successfully pushed for working with producer Bob Ezrin (Pink Floyd, Alice Cooper, Kiss) and engineer Brian Virtue.

Deftones then took a short break before planning a month-long tour with Dredg and C-Minus to road-test some material starting in San Francisco, California, and ending in Hartford, Connecticut, near where Ezrin's studio was located. Recording of the album began in November 2004. During the sessions, tensions mounted within the band and between Moreno and Ezrin. Moreno eventually jumped ship to continue work on his side project Team Sleep while the rest of the band continued recording. The Ezrin sessions concluded before Christmas and the band relocated back to their home base in Sacramento to take a break.

In early 2005, Deftones started tweaking the Ezrin material with Virtue at their studio The Spot, writing several new songs in the process. Moreno decided to take a break from recording in the spring to tour with Team Sleep, who were also releasing their long-awaited debut album. Moreno claimed that this was good for him, as he was somewhat unable to focus on the recording sessions due to his speed and alcohol addictions, as well as the dissolution of his longtime marriage to wife Celeste.

=== Break and later sessions ===
The rest of the band, while anxious to finish the album, decided it would be best to take a break from music. During the break, Deftones released a 10-year anniversary CD/DVD, titled B-Sides & Rarities, on October 4, 2005. It included one of the songs from the Virtue sessions, a cover of "Wax and Wane" by Cocteau Twins. In late 2005, Moreno met with Date to help record vocals for some of the remaining tracks. The band also managed to quickly record a cover of John Lennon's "Jealous Guy" for Amnesty International as well as an iTunes exclusive cover of the Cars' "Drive".

In early 2006, all previously recorded vocals were scrapped and the band started working on the album again with longtime friend Shaun Lopez (of Far and the Revolution Smile) acting as producer. The album was edited by Ryan Gorman. Finally, with all recording finished in April 2006, the album was mixed by Ryan Williams.

The album featured musical contributions from Annie Hardy of Giant Drag and Serj Tankian of System of a Down; the latter also contributed to the writing of one song, "Mein".

Carpenter stated in interviews that a significant portion of the songs were based on ideas by Moreno and that "Pink Cellphone", minus Hardy's vocals, was "all Chino". In fact, Moreno plays second guitar on many of the songs, including "Hole in the Earth", "Beware", "Cherry Waves", "U,U,D,D,L,R,L,R,A,B,Select,Start", "Xerces" and "Rivière". However, Moreno stated that "Rats!Rats!Rats!" was "all Stephen". Carpenter wrote and recorded all guitar parts on "Rapture", "Rats!Rats!Rats!" and "Kimdracula", but also played guitar and wrote guitar parts for all songs except "U,U,D,D,L,R,L,R,A,B,Select,Start", where he played drums and Moreno played guitar. The title for the latter song was a reference to the Konami Code, a famous video game cheat code.

The writing and recording process of Saturday Night Wrist was fraught and placed strain on the relationships within the band. Moreno stated that making it was "a seriously unhealthy experience", and that it "dragged on without much direction". Following its creation, after leaving to work on Team Sleep, he stated that he "wasn't sure if [he] was going to return".

== Lyrical themes ==
Moreno described the lyrical subject matter of some of the songs in later interviews. He explained that "Kimdracula" was part of his email address at the beginning of making the record, which was a period of heavy drug use. "Beware" was a warning to others about sex, drugs and drinking, which were the three main problems he encountered during the album's creation. A story about a witch that Moreno wrote while high on drugs became "Rivière". "Cherry Waves" was about testing the trust a person has in someone else. The confusion Moreno experienced while making Saturday Night Wrist was illustrated in the song "Rapture". Communication issues that divided the band during the making of the album were captured in "Hole in the Earth".

Moreno explained the record's title as being a reference to the nerve damage caused when an intoxicated person falls asleep on their arm. He elaborated on the title, referencing "when you're alone on Saturday nights and your only best friend is your shaking wrist".

== Release ==
Saturday Night Wrist was released on October 31, 2006. It was leaked on the Internet on October 13, over two weeks prior to its release. Lead single "Hole in the Earth" was sent to radio on October 16.

A collection of 16 demos from the Ezrin sessions later became available online, containing rough vocal mixes of "Cherry Waves" and "Combat", an instrumental version of what would become "Finger of Death", and several instrumentals recorded by the band without Moreno that did not make the final cut.

The iTunes version included the cover of "Drive" by the Cars, which featured producer Lopez as well as a prominent sample of Massive Attack's track "Protection".

== Critical reception ==
Professional ratings
Aggregate scores
Source	Rating
Metacritic	72/100
Review scores
Source	Rating
AllMusic	3.5/5 stars
Alternative Press	5/5 stars
The A.V. Club	B+
Blabbermouth.net	8/10
Drowned in Sound	9/10
Entertainment Weekly	B
PopMatters	7/10
Q	2/5 stars
Rolling Stone	3.5/5 stars
Spin	6/10

According to the review aggregator Metacritic, Saturday Night Wrist received "generally favorable reviews" based on a weighted average score of 72 out of 100 from 18 critic scores. Many critics and fans alike praised the album's tracks influenced by real-life struggles within the band. During a 2016 interview with Kerrang, Moreno revealed that the tensions during the recording process and Chi Cheng's death have prevented him from listening to the album since its release. Alternative Press gave the album a perfect score, stating "'Saturday Night Wrist' proves yet again that Deftones have a corner on the transcendental-metal market". Drowned in Sound also gave it a positive review, saying: "If you've even the slightest interest in 'heavy' music, you simply must make Saturday Night Wrist an integral part of your record collection".

The A.V. Club gave it a positive review, stating: "The album is mostly a heady, atmospheric, willfully too-difficult-for-radio wash of sound that, save for a handful of tracks, stretches out and explores Deftones' creative limits more than ever before". Similarly, Adrien Begrand of PopMatters concluded: "For the most part, Saturday Night Wrist has the Deftones improving on all fronts, whether it's Moreno's stirring vocal work or the band's improved versatility ... The process might have been painstaking, but it appears that after all that work, the band is closer to a fully-realized sound than ever before."

Another positive review came from AllMusic, which said that "these songs, as diverse as they are, are utterly disciplined sonically. They have all the tension and dynamic, all the immediacy of yore, but the mix is spacious, and Chino Moreno's vocals soar above it". A less enthusiastic, although positive, review came from Rolling Stone's Christian Hoard, who compared the band's "space-rock overlays" with Radiohead, but stated that "The songwriting never quite comes together, but this is a metal record that gets by as much on sonic tricks as monster riffs". Hoard nonetheless noted that the album was "viscerally shaking" and "artfully alluring," noting that "it's as dark as the Deftones have ever gotten, with sludgy stoner-rock bumping against prog-metal chops and scorched-earth atmospherics." Spin called the album "a sideways step in the right direction".

PopMatters also noted that the band delved deep into shoegaze on the song "Cherry Waves". In 2016, Jonathan Dick of NPR Music retrospectively described the album as containing "math metal tendencies". The same year, Consequence of Sound placed the album's post-rock-influenced instrumental track, "U,U,D,D,L,R,L,R,A,B,Select,Start", at No. 15 in their list "The Top 20 Deftones Songs", describing the song as a "jazzy instrumental [that] ebbs and flows unlike anything else the band’s ever produced, a credit to the song’s bizarre instrumentation". PopMatters had also previously praised "U,U,D,D,L,R,L,R,A,B,Select,Start" as proof of Deftones' musical versatility.

== Track listing ==
All songs written by Deftones except where noted. "Pink Cellphone" is 3:54 on the clean album version.

No.	Title	Writer(s)	Length
1.	"Hole in the Earth"		4:09
2.	"Rapture"		3:25
3.	"Beware"		6:00
4.	"Cherry Waves"		5:17
5.	"Mein" (featuring Serj Tankian)	Deftones, Serj Tankian, Shaun Lopez	3:59
6.	"U,U,D,D,L,R,L,R,A,B,Select,Start" (instrumental)		4:12
7.	"Xerces"		3:42
8.	"Rats!Rats!Rats!"		4:01
9.	"Pink Cellphone" (featuring Annie Hardy)	Deftones, Annie Hardy	5:04
10.	"Combat"		4:46
11.	"Kimdracula"		3:14
12.	"Rivière"		3:45
Total length:			51:40

iTunes bonus track
No.	Title	Writer(s)	Length
13.	"Drive" (featuring Shaun Lopez)	Ric Ocasek	4:50
Total length:			56:30

== Personnel ==
=== Deftones ===
- Chino Moreno − vocals, rhythm guitar
- Stephen Carpenter − lead guitar
- Chi Cheng − bass
- Frank Delgado − keyboards, samples
- Abe Cunningham − drums

=== Additional musicians ===
- Serj Tankian − additional vocals on "Mein"
- Annie Hardy − additional vocals on "Pink Cellphone"

=== Production ===
- Produced by Bob Ezrin and Deftones
- Vocals produced and additional production by Shaun Lopez
- Recorded and engineered by Brian Virtue and Brian Humphrey
- Drums on "Beware" recorded by Joe Johnston
- Assisted by Robert "Flossy" Cheek at The Spot, Sacramento, and The Hangar, Sacramento
- Pro Tools engineer: Ryan Gorman
- Recorded at the Carriage House, Stamford, Connecticut; The Spot, Sacramento; The Airport, Burbank, California; The Hangar, Sacramento; Morning View House, Malibu, California
- Mixed by Ryan Williams
- Mixed at Pulse Recordings, Los Angeles, California and Westlake Recording Studios, Los Angeles, California
- Assistant mix engineer at Westlake Recording Studios: Brian Warwick
- Mastered by Howie Weinberg at Masterdisk, New York, NY
- Creative direction and design: Frank Maddocks
- Photography by Lego
- Images from the motion picture Roxanna courtesy of Retro-Seduction Cinema

== Charts ==
=== Album ===
Chart (2006)	Peak position
Australian Albums (ARIA)	26
Austrian Albums (Ö3 Austria)	18
Belgian Albums (Ultratop Flanders)	70
Belgian Albums (Ultratop Wallonia)	49
Canadian Albums (Billboard)	4
Danish Albums (Hitlisten)	30
Dutch Albums (Album Top 100)	63
Finnish Albums (Suomen virallinen lista)	33
French Albums (SNEP)	33
German Albums (Offizielle Top 100)	24
Irish Albums (IRMA)	50
Italian Albums (FIMI)	48
New Zealand Albums (RMNZ)	8
Norwegian Albums (VG-lista)	32
Scottish Albums (Official Charts)	30
Swedish Albums (Sverigetopplistan)	35
Swiss Albums (Schweizer Hitparade)	31
UK Albums (Official Charts)	33
US Billboard 200	10
US Top Rock Albums (Billboard)	4
US Indie Store Album Sales (Billboard)	1

=== Singles ===
Year	Song	Peak position		
Year	Song	US Alt.	US Main.	UK
2006	"Hole in the Earth"	18	19	69
2007	"Mein"	38	40	—

== Certifications ==
Certifications for Saturday Night Wrist
Region	Certification	Certified units/sales
New Zealand (RMNZ)	Gold	7,500^{‡}
United Kingdom (BPI)	Gold	100,000^{‡}
United States (RIAA)	Gold	500,000^{‡}
^{‡} Sales+streaming figures based on certification alone.
