= Dexter Tortoriello =

American singer-songwriter

- Also known as: Dawn Golden
- Born: Dexter Miles Tortoriello; August 5, 1986 (age 40)
- Origin: Chicago, United States
- Genres: Electronic, indie pop
- Occupations: Singer, songwriter, musician, producer
- Years active: 2009–present
- Labels: Downtown Records, Mad Decent, Lefse
- Website: housesmusic.com

Dexter Miles Tortoriello (born August 5, 1986) is an American singer, songwriter and record producer. He rose to prominence as part of the group Houses and is also known for his work as Dawn Golden, as well as his production for pop and hip-hop artists.

== Life and career ==
=== Early life and career beginnings ===
Tortoriello grew up in Chicago. One of his father's friends owned a recording studio, so Tortoriello and his brother had access to a wide range of analog recording equipment, including eight-track recorders and effects racks, from at least the age of twelve. This led to him starting numerous musical projects, initially focusing on electronic music but later developing into doom metal, noise, and ambient styles.

=== Houses and All Night (2009–2011) ===
After spending several months off the grid in Hawaii at the beginning of 2010, Tortoriello and his partner Megan Messina returned to Chicago, where he began to combine samples of older projects with field recordings from the island to create his first songs as Houses. Houses' style was a significant departure from his previous work, showcasing a blissed out, hypnagogic pop sound. Soon after Tortoriello posted the song "Endless Spring" on his Myspace page, Pitchfork featured the track on their website, and within three days Houses was signed by Lefse Records. Messina joined the group soon after. Houses released the album via Lefse on October 19, 2010, and played their first shows on October 20 at the CMJ Music Marathon in New York. At the same time, their single "Soak It Up" was featured as part of a multimedia photography retrospective at the New York Public Library Main Branch. In 2011, the band toured North America and performed at South By Southwest.

=== Dawn Golden (2011) ===
After releasing All Night, Tortoriello began posting solo material on Bandcamp. The sound was a significant departure from Houses, described by Time Out as "dark, droning and ethereal." He released the Blow EP in early 2011 via Bandcamp. Soon after, Diplo reached out to Tortoriello via Myspace and signed the act to his label, Mad Decent. On April 12, 2011, he re-released Blow via Mad Decent and Downtown Records. The EP was generally well received, described by NPR Music as "aggressive and immediate" and by the Chicago Reader as "vital and exciting." Tortoriello played the Mad Decent Block Party as Dawn Golden in August 2011.

=== A Quiet Darkness and Still Life (2011–2014) ===
In 2012, Tortoriello and Messina began work on their second record, an apocalyptic concept album titled A Quiet Darkness. The duo used field recordings from abandoned houses, schools, and cabins in Desert Center, California to build out their ambient electronic soundscapes. Tortoriello turned samples of light switch clicks, stomping feet and sweeping dust into drum kits, and augmented studio instrumentation with impulse responses from inside and outside the buildings. They finished the album at Sonic Ranch in Tornillo, Texas, before relocating to Los Angeles. Houses released videos for "The Beauty Surrounds" and "Beginnings" in February and March 2013, respectively. They released A Quiet Darkness on April 16, 2013, via Downtown Records, after pre-streaming the album on The Huffington Post.

At the same time, Tortoriello was working on Still Life, his debut full-length as Dawn Golden. On April 25, 2014, he released the single "All I Want" as Dawn Golden. A video for "All I Want" was released on Majestic Casual's YouTube channel, directed by Tyler T. Williams. On May 13, 2014, he released Still Life, via Mad Decent and Downtown Records. Later that year, he released a video for "Still Life" directed by Kyle DePinna and Still Life (Remixes) featuring contributions from Diplo and Manila Killa.

=== Production and songwriting (since 2015) ===
Since 2015, Tortoriello has worked as a producer and songwriter for numerous electronic, hip-hop and R&B artists. As Dawn Golden, he appeared as a featured artist and co-writer on Ryan Hemsworth's "Snow in Newark" (2014), What So Not's "Arrows" (2015) and Martin Garrix's "Sun Is Never Going Down" (2016), and has co-writing and production credits on Kali Uchis' "Melting" (2015) and Lil Yachty's "Forever Young" (2017).

=== Drugstore Heaven (since 2017) ===
On August 24, 2018, Tortoriello released the single "Fast Talk" under his Houses moniker and announced a new EP, Drugstore Heaven, which was released on September 28, 2018. A lyric video for "Fast Talk" was released on October 22, 2018, with an official video released on January 28, 2019. The vinyl version of the EP features remixes from Com Truise, Willy Moon, Still Woozy, and Vexxed on the b-side. Praise for "Fast Talk" and Drugstore Heaven has come from a range of publications including Nylon and Billboard, with the latter calling the single "entrancing." In January 2019, "Fast Talk" began to chart on the Alternative Songs, Rock Airplay, and Hot Rock Songs charts in the US, the first of any Houses single to do so. In 2019, the song "Fast Talk" reached the top 10 on alternative radio charts.

=== Microsoft ===
In November 2026, Tortoriello joined Microsoft as a Solution Engineer on the Digital Natives Pursuits team. In the role, he works with high-growth technology companies and startups on cloud and artificial intelligence solutions, following a career spanning music production, songwriting and technology.

== Discography ==
=== Studio albums ===
==== As Houses ====
Title	Album details	Peak chart positions
Title	Album details	US Heat
All Night	Released: October 19, 2010; Label: Lefse; Formats: CD, LP, digital download	—
A Quiet Darkness	Released: April 16, 2013; Label: Downtown Records; Formats: CD, LP, digital download	33
Drugstore Heaven	Released: April 2, 2021; Label: Downtown Records; Formats: CD, LP, digital download	—

==== As Dawn Golden ====
Title	Album details
Still Life	Released: May 13, 2014; Label: Downtown Records, Mad Decent; Formats: LP, digital download

=== Extended plays ===
==== As Houses ====
Title	Album details
Drugstore Heaven	Released: September 28, 2018; Label: Downtown Records; Formats: LP, digital download
Drugstore Heaven (Remixes)	Released: November 9, 2018; Label: Downtown Records; Format: digital download

==== As Dawn Golden ====
Title	Album details
Blow	Released: April 12, 2011; Label: Downtown Records, Mad Decent; Format: digital download
Blow (Remixes)	Released: January 1, 2012; Label: Downtown Records, Mad Decent; Format: digital download
Still Life (Remixes)	Released: September 9, 2014; Label: Downtown Records, Mad Decent; Format: digital download

=== Guest appearances ===
Title	Year	Artist(s)	Album
"Snow in Newark" (featuring Dawn Golden)	2014	Ryan Hemsworth	Alone for the First Time
"Arrows" (featuring Dawn Golden)	2015	What So Not, Dillon Francis	Gemini EP
"Sun Is Never Going Down" (featuring Dawn Golden)	2016	Martin Garrix	Seven

=== Remixes ===
Title	Year	Artist
"Transcendence" (Dawn Golden Remix)	2014	Audiomachine
"Sleepwalking" (Dawn Golden Remix)	2014	The Chain Gang of 1974
"You Haunt Me" (Dawn Golden Remix)	2015	Sir Sly
"All We Need" (Dawn Golden Remix)	2016	Odesza featuring Shy Girls
"The Struggle" (Dawn Golden Remix)	2016	Grizfolk

=== Songwriting and production credits ===
Title	Year	Artist(s)	Album	Credits	Written with	Produced with
"Snow in Newark" (featuring Dawn Golden)	2014	Ryan Hemsworth	Alone for the First Time	Co-writer	Hemsworth	
"Melting"	2015	Kali Uchis	Por Vida	Co-writer/producer	Karly-Marina Loaiza, Alex Epton, Thomas Pentz	Alex Epton, Diplo
"Sun Is Never Going Down" (featuring Dawn Golden)	2016	Martin Garrix	Seven	Co-writer	Justin Broad, Jem Cooke, Martijn Garritsen, Paul Herman, James McCollum	
"Forever Young" (featuring Diplo)	2017	Lil Yachty	Teenage Emotions	Co-writer/producer	Miles McCollum, Thomas Pentz	Diplo
"Found"	2023	Crosses	Goodnight, God Bless, I Love U, Delete.	Co-writer/producer	Crosses	
