= We the Living (band) =

American alternative rock band

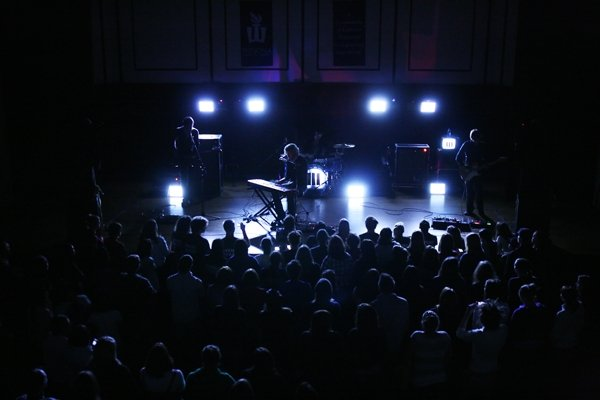
- We the Living performs at Winona State University on November 13, 2008.

Background information
- Origin: Baraboo, Wisconsin, U.S.
- Genres: Acoustic rock Alternative; Indie rock
- Years active: 2006–2010
- Members: John Paul Roney; Benjamin Schaefer; Matthew Holmen; Brian Holl
- Past members: Stefan Benkowski; Jeremy “Jasper” Smith; Rylan Soref
- Website: web.archive.org/web/20100228075116/http://www.wetheliving.com/

We the Living was a United States alternative rock group composed of singer, songwriter and guitarist John Paul Roney (a.k.a. Boom Forest), electric guitarist Matthew Holmen, and drummer Benjamin Schaefer. Their sound draws on several musical genres, including pop, indie rock, melodic rock, and alternative to which the band refers to as melody-driven, British influenced pop-rock. Since forming in Baraboo, Wisconsin, We the Living was last based in Nashville.

== History ==
=== End of The Profits, Beginning of We the Living ===
We the Living began in April 2007 in Madison, Wisconsin as a project of singer John Paul Roney and drummer Benjamin Schaefer after their band, The Profits, which was renowned within the Wisconsin college music scene, disbanded. Soon after recruiting guitarist Matthew Holmen and bassist Stefan Benkowski, We the Living began to play the same venue circuits that The Profits had formerly commanded.

However, the music had a very different, more grown-up sound and pulled from new influences such as Coldplay, Mutemath, Radiohead, The Fray, John Mayer, and others of similar genres.

=== Heights of the Heavens (2007-2008) ===
The band was first signed to Authentik Artists, a label with a focus on digital marketing and distribution, founded by former Warner/Capitol/Maverick A&R Scott Austin and Legendary Pictures founder Scott Mednick. Under Austin's management the band began work on their debut full-length CD.

We the Living's first album Heights of the Heavens was originally released on April 17, 2007. The record was mixed by Mark Needham (Fleetwood Mac, The Killers, Metro Station)and engineered by Shaun Lopez of Far. It received much acclaim for its lyrically deft yet soulful sound and allowed the band to headline 180 acts during the 2007 year. These performances also included performing with Angels and Airwaves, Gym Class Heroes, Dashboard Confessional, Katy Perry, Anberlin, Ludo, We The Kings, Relient K, Jack's Mannequin, Say Anything, Hellogoodbye, Circa Survive, The Academy Is…, The Roots, Blessid Union of Souls, Sherwood, Motion City Soundtrack, and The Color Fred. During this time the band also headlined major musical festivals around the Midwest.

In 2008 the band re-released a remastered copy of Heights of the Heavens. The new copy also came in different packaging, which they used to launch the concept of Philo, or each person's own life philosophy, and which reflected the significance this subject has had on the band's success, fans, as well as personal lives.

=== Depths of the Earth (2008) ===
After touring in support of Heights of the Heavens and fulfilling its contract with Authentik Artists, the band returned to the studio to independently record five songs that weren't ready in time for the wrapping of the first record. Taking the name from the second half of a Sun Tzu quote that Heights of the Heavens was obtained from, the band completed and mixed Depths of the Earth at Smart Studios in Madison, Wisconsin with Beau Sorensen (Death Cab for Cutie, Tegan and Sara).

=== Reviews, airplay, and new projects ===
On March 25, 2008 We the Living's song “Best Laid Plans” was featured on celebrity blog run by Perez Hilton featured as a band to love. In the blog Perez stated that with the quality of the melody and piano it should be the theme song to the new Beverly Hills, 90210 spin-off. After this posting, the band's music began to reach the ears of many who were not in their touring circuit, which allowed the band to become a featured artist on tastemaker sites such as Purevolume, Myspace, AOL Music, Clear Channel, iMeem, and BeBo. Receiving constant positive reviews from newspapers and other publications such as the arts section of the national satirical syndicate, The Onion and AP Magazine the band's airplay soared. In the fall of 2008, We the Living's "Best Laid Plans" was selected by Levi's brand clothing to be a part of their nationwide Unbuttoned ad campaign. The band has earned spins on over 200 A/C and college radio station as well as prominent placement on MTV, VH1, E!, G4, Oxygen, Discovery, and MTV2. Most recently, the band was featured as a Buzz Band by Seventeen Magazine

We the Living has performed at the South by Southwest Music festival in Austin, Texas, Cornerstone Musical Festival, CMJ, as well as the "World's Largest Music Festival" Summerfest in Milwaukee, Wisconsin which included a headline spot on the Chipotle Rhythm Kitchen Stage. They also spent summer 2008 on the Van's Warped Tour on the Kevin Says Stage.

== Disbanding ==
In late 2010, We The Living announced on their blog that they were disbanding citing a loss of passion. No future plans to make music together were mentioned.

== Discography ==
=== Albums ===
- Heights of the Heavens (Deus ex Machina edition) (2007)
- Heights of the Heavens (Machina ex Deus edition) Remastered and Rereleased (2008)
- Depths of the Earth (2008)
