= EP 1 (Crosses EP) =

EP by Crosses
- Released: August 2, 2011
- Recorded: Airport Studios, Los Angeles, California
- Genre: Witch house, electronic rock
- Length: 18:33
- Label: Self-released
- Producer: Shaun Lopez

Crosses chronology
EP 1 (2011)	EP 2 (2012)

Professional ratings
Review scores
Source	Rating
Alternative Press	4/5 stars
Beats Per Minute	60%

EP 1 (stylized as EP †) is the first EP by the rock band Crosses. It was recorded at Airport Studios in Los Angeles and self-released on August 2, 2011, in digital format. A low-quality version was made available for free, with higher-quality file types available for US$5. In November 2011, Crosses released a limited edition of the EP, including a colored vinyl 10", USB drive with remixes, and band merchandise.

== Track listing ==
1. "This Is a Trick" – 3:07
2. "Option" – 4:25
3. "Bermuda Locket" – 3:42
4. "Thholyghst" – 4:26
5. "Cross" – 2:53

Note: All tracks on the album have a † symbol in their title, as substitute for the letter "T"; "Cross" is simply labelled "†".

== Personnel ==
Crosses

- Chino Moreno – vocals
- Shaun Lopez – guitar, keyboards; production, engineering, mixing
- Chuck Doom – bass

Additional musicians

- Duff McKagan – additional bass on "This is a Trick"
- Chris Robyn – live drums

Production and artwork

- Eric Broyhill – mastering
- Brendan Dekora – assistant engineer
- Brooke Nipar – photography
- Eric Stenman – mix engineer
