= EP 2 (Crosses EP) =

EP by Crosses
- Released: January 24, 2012
- Length: 18:45
- Label: Self-released
- Producer: Shaun Lopez, Crosses

Crosses chronology
EP 1 (2011)	EP 2 (2012)	Crosses (2014)

EP 2 ratings
Review scores
Source	Rating
Beats Per Minute	60%
Sputnikmusic	3.5/5

EP 2 (stylized as EP ††) is the second EP by the American musical group Crosses. The EP was self-released on January 24, 2012. The deluxe download version available from the Crosses website included high-resolution front and back artwork, digital booklet, demo "seeds", as well as an exclusive 10-minute video documenting the recording process of the first two EPs and short clips of then-unreleased songs, in addition to the high-quality digital download of the standard digital download version.

EP 2 ranked at No. 8 on Billboard's Top Heatseekers chart.

== Track listing ==
1. "Frontiers" – 4:01
2. "Prurient" – 4:06
3. "Telepathy" – 3:35
4. "Trophy" – 3:52
5. "1987" – 3:11

Note: Like the previous EP, all songs (with the exception of 1987) contain a † in place of the letter 't' in their titles.

== Personnel ==
EP 2 personnel adapted from digital booklet.

Crosses

- Chuck Doom
- Shaun Lopez
- Chino Moreno

Additional musicians

- Stephan Boettcher – mandolin assistance
- Molly Carson – phone call on "Frontiers"
- Chris Robyn (Far) – live drums

Production

- Eric Broyhill – mastering
- Crosses – production
- Brendan Dekora – engineering assistance
- Shaun Lopez – production, engineering, mixing
- Eric Stenman – mix engineering

Artwork

- Brooke Nipar – photography on front and back covers
