= Droid (band) =

American metal band

- Origin: Long Beach, California, U.S.
- Genres: Groove metal, metalcore
- Years active: 1997–2010
- Labels: Emotional Syphon Recordings
- Past members: Jamie Teissere; Bruce Childress; Nick McWells; Ryan Burchfield; Duke; James Eason; Dirt E Bryan; FIL; Ryan Denys

Droid (sometimes typeset as -D-R-O-I-D- or DROID as to fit their official logo) was an American groove metal band from Long Beach, California, formerly signed to Korn member James "Munky" Shaffer's record label Emotional Syphon Records.

== History ==
Droid was signed to Emotional Syphon Records after Korn guitarist James "Munky" Shaffer saw them perform at the world-renowned Whisky a Go Go in Los Angeles. The band accompanied Korn and Limp Bizkit on their 2003 Back 2 Basics Tour, as well as the 2006 and 2007 installments of the Family Values Tour.

Droid also served as backing musicians for Korn bassist Fieldy's side project Fieldy's Dreams.

The band was voted 2007 newcomer of the year at The Gauntlet, and the music video for "Fueled by Hate" was voted the No. 11 video of 2007 on MTV2's Headbangers Ball.

Droid released a free new song "Condemn the Weak" in 2009 on Droidmusic.com in anticipation of following-up their self-titled 2007 album, but it never materialized. The band is currently defunct.

Former bassist Wilfred "Duke" Collins died on March 22, 2015.

== Discography ==
Title	Release date	Label
Demo	2001	Independent
Demo	2002	Independent
Arizona EP	2002	Independent
Swallow the Cure	2003	Independent
Swallow the Cure	2006	Emotional Syphon Records
Droid	July 10, 2007	Emotional Syphon Records

== Members ==
=== Final lineup ===
- James Eason – vocals (1997–2010)
- Jamie Teissere – guitar (1997–2010)
- Bruce Childress – guitar (1997–2010)
- Nick McWells – drums (2005–2010)
- Ryan Burchfield – bass (2007–2010)

=== Former members ===
- Steve Marcucci – drums (1996–2001)
- Alan Mendoza – bass (1996–2000)
- Filthy – vocals
- Dirt E – bass (2001, 2004–2005)
- Jason Garrison – drums (2001)
- Bryan – bass (2002–2004)
- Wilfred "Duke" Collins – bass (2005–2007)
- Fil Rebellato – drums (2002–2004)
