= Ohms (album) =

Studio album by Deftones
- Released: September 25, 2020
- Recorded: 2019–2020
- Studios: Henson (Hollywood); Trainwreck (Seattle)
- Genres: Alternative metal; shoegaze; post-hardcore; dream pop
- Length: 46:22
- Label: Reprise
- Producers: Terry Date; Deftones

Deftones chronology
Gore (2016)	Ohms (2020)	Private Music (2025)

Singles from Ohms
- 1. "Ohms" Released: August 21, 2020; 2. "Genesis" Released: September 18, 2020; 3. "Ceremony" Released: January 26, 2021

Ohms (stylized as _Ohms on physical editions) is the ninth studio album by the American alternative metal band Deftones, released on September 25, 2020, through Reprise Records. The album was produced by Terry Date, making it their first collaboration since the unreleased Eros and the final with bassist Sergio Vega who departed from the band in early 2021. The album was preceded by the release of two singles: "Ohms" and "Genesis". The song "Ceremony" was later released as a single. Ohms received acclaim from critics. At the 64th Annual Grammy Awards, "Ohms" and "Genesis" were nominated for Best Rock Performance and Best Metal Performance, respectively.

== Background and production ==
Deftones released their eighth studio album Gore on April 8, 2016, via Warner Bros. Records. As part of the album promotion, the band embarked on an extensive US tour in the summer of 2016, with support from Refused and Spotlights. The following summer, they performed a coheadlining North American tour with Rise Against, featuring support from Thrice. In 2018, Deftones hosted the first annual Dia de los Deftones festival at Petco Park, featuring performances from artists like Future, Mike Shinoda, Rocket from the Crypt, and Doja Cat.

In a 2017 interview with NME, vocalist Chino Moreno said that Deftones had "talked about getting together sooner [rather] than later" on a new album. On March 28, 2018, the Deftones Instagram account shared images of the band at a recording studio, one of which was captioned "Someone say jam?!". That May, Moreno told Rock.com.AR that the band had "six or seven new songs, which are still mutating". Deftones provided another update on the album in April 2020, with drummer Abe Cunningham saying in an Instagram video that, due to the COVID-19 pandemic, "it's been a bit difficult to get everyone in the same room", but that they were in the process of mixing the new album, and were aiming for a late 2020 release date. Deftones worked with producer Terry Date on Ohms, their first collaboration since the unreleased Eros album in 2008. Recording took place at Henson Recording Studios in Los Angeles and Trainwreck Studios in Seattle.

== Composition ==
Musically, Ohms has been described as an alternative metal, shoegaze, and post-hardcore album. Classic Rock magazine added a different assessment, calling the album "dream pop with a metallic edge". It is the first Deftones album since their eponymous 2003 album to be produced by Terry Date, although the band had worked with him during the sessions of the unreleased album Eros in 2008. It is also their first album in which Stephen Carpenter utilizes a nine-string guitar.

== Packaging ==
The cover art was designed by Frank Maddocks, who has worked with Deftones on each of their albums since White Pony. There are a total of 12,995 dots on the cover art. Many fans believed that the design pays tribute to the band's original bassist Chi Cheng, who died in 2013, as the eyes that appear on the cover art line up closely with a photo of him. Band drummer Abe Cunningham stated in an interview that this was merely a coincidence, however. He added that the cover art idea reminded him of the 1980s, specifically the music video for Prince's 1984 song "When Doves Cry". Shortly before the album's release, Deftones launched the "Adopt a Dot" campaign, allowing for people to purchase one of the dots on the artwork as their own. A photo of the purchaser would then appear as the dot they purchased and be a part of the "Ohms Adopt a Dot digital experience" viewable online. The proceeds from the campaign were given to the UC Davis Children's Hospital and Crew Nation relief fund.

== Promotion ==
The band began teasing the album's release with a week-long digital campaign in August 2020. Deftones released cryptic social media posts, their official website and animations through Spotify's Canvas feature that when solved revealed the word "ohms" and longitudinal coordinates for a billboard in Los Angeles teasing the album artwork. The campaign concluded with a formal announcement for Ohms and a music video for the album's lead single, "Ohms". The music video for "Ohms" was directed by Rafatoon and featured what Rolling Stone described as, "band performance video interspersed with scenes from a dystopian world, mirroring the musically and lyrically heavy song sentiments." At the time of release, vocalist Chino Moreno described "Ohms" as a "a good scope of where this record's at," though in a separate interview producer Terry Date felt the song was not a good choice for the album's lead promotional track.

Deftones were originally scheduled to tour North America in support of Ohms with Gojira and Poppy in July to September 2020. Due to the COVID-19 pandemic, the tour was postponed until 2021.

== Reception ==
Professional ratings
Aggregate scores
Source	Rating
AnyDecentMusic?	8.6/10
Metacritic	87/100
Review scores
Source	Rating
AllMusic	4/5 stars
Consequence of Sound	A−
DIY	4.5/5 stars
Exclaim!	9/10
The Guardian	3/5 stars
The Independent	4/5 stars
Kerrang!	4/5
NME	5/5 stars
Pitchfork	7.6/10
Sputnikmusic	5/5

According to the review aggregator Metacritic, Ohms received "universal acclaim" based on a weighted average score of 87 out of 100 from 21 critic scores. AllMusic critic Neil Z. Yeung thought that Deftones "take their signature beauty-meets-brutality assault, searching for balance across a tightly focused ten tracks." Yeung further stated: "As a unit, they haven't sounded this refreshed in years." Consequence of Sound's Joseph Schafer described Ohms as "their hardest-hitting effort in years" and "a record that hints at a purified blend of their contrasting influences in its finest moments." Ben Tipple of DIY praised Date's production work and stated: "If any of Deftones’ previous records are guilty of lacking focus (you decide), ‘Ohms‘ is certainly safe from future vitriol."

Describing Ohms as "truly and honestly a breath of fresh air," Exclaim! critic Adam Wallis thought that the record was "just as unique and innovative as each album before it." The Independent's Roisin O'Connor regarded the album as "an intriguing addition to the band’s canon," while David McLaughlin from Kerrang! likened it to a "greatest hits [record] from a parallel plane of existence, yet dense enough to demand deeper exploration." Writing for NME, James McMahon described Ohms as "heavy stuff, both sonically and in emotional clout." Andy Crump of Paste regarded the album as "an engrossing refinement of what they’ve become over years of risk-taking and experimentation." Sputnikmusic staff critic SowingSeason thought that the record "surpasses Deftones’ other iconic releases is in its dense, unpredictable layering and sheer intensity." He further stated: "There aren’t many traits present on Ohms that we’ve never heard from the band before,... but they’ve woven all these glimpses of previous albums together and improved upon them in nearly every facet."

In a more mixed review, The Guardian's Dean Van Nguyen wrote that the album "lacks the lateral thinking that distinguished the band’s masterpiece, White Pony." Nevertheless, Nguyen further explained: "Still, by streamlining their sound, Deftones have made an album that proves that ferocity is not a diminishing resource." Andy Cush at Pitchfork was also more reserved in his praise for the album than most critics, claiming the band are "not attempting to radically shift your notion of what their music can be. For those of us who have stuck around, that’s just fine; a Deftones album that effortlessly twists their familiar components into a few genuinely new shapes is plenty exciting"

=== Accolades ===
"Genesis" and "Ohms" were nominated for Best Metal Performance and Best Rock Performance, respectively, at the 64th Grammy Awards.

Year-end lists
Publication	List	Rank	Ref.
AllMusic	AllMusic Best of 2020	N/A	
Alternative Press	The 50 Best Albums of 2020	N/A	
Beats Per Minute	Top 50 Albums of 2020	14	
Consequence of Sound	Top 50 Albums of 2020	7	
Double J	Top 50 Albums of 2020	34	
Exclaim!	Exclaim!s 50 Best Albums of 2020	19	
Gigwise	The Gigwise 51 Best Albums of 2020	8	
Kerrang!	The 50 Greatest Albums of 2020	3	
Louder Than War	Top 50 Albums of 2020	43	
Loudwire	The 70 Best Rock + Metal Albums of 2020	1	
Loudwire	The Best Hard Rock Album of Each Year Since 1970	1	
Metal Hammer	50 Best Metal Albums of 2020	1	
NME	The 50 Best Albums of 2020	13	
PopMatters	The 60 Best Albums of 2020	20	
Revolver	25 Best Albums of 2020	1	
Spin	The 30 Best Albums of 2020	12	
Sputnikmusic	Top 50 Albums of 2020	19	

== Track listing ==
All lyrics are written by Chino Moreno; all music is composed by Deftones (Stephen Carpenter, Abe Cunningham, Frank Delgado, Chino Moreno, Sergio Vega).

Ohms track listing
No.	Title	Length
1.	"Genesis"	5:17
2.	"Ceremony"	3:27
3.	"Urantia"	4:30
4.	"Error"	4:50
5.	"The Spell of Mathematics"	5:27
6.	"Pompeji"	5:25
7.	"This Link Is Dead"	4:37
8.	"Radiant City"	3:35
9.	"Headless"	4:59
10.	"Ohms"	4:10
Total length:		46:22

== Personnel ==
Personnel adapted from liner notes.

Deftones

- Chino Moreno − vocals, guitar
- Stephen Carpenter − guitar
- Abe Cunningham − drums
- Frank Delgado − samples, keyboards
- Sergio Vega (Note: Despite being credited as a member in the liner notes, Vega disputes his status as a full time member of the band, claiming that he was a member of the band only under contract.) − bass guitar

Technical

- Terry Date – production, recording, engineering mixing
- Deftones – production, photographs
- Andy Park – recording, engineering
- Matt Tuggle – recording and engineering assistance
- Howie Weinberg – mastering
- Will Borza – mastering
- Frank Maddocks – creative direction, design
- Clemente Ruiz – photographs

== Charts ==
=== Weekly charts ===
Weekly chart performance for Ohms
Chart (2020)	Peak position
Australian Albums (ARIA)	3
Austrian Albums (Ö3 Austria)	11
Belgian Albums (Ultratop Flanders)	11
Belgian Albums (Ultratop Wallonia)	11
Croatian International Albums (HDU)	1
Dutch Albums (Album Top 100)	20
Finnish Albums (Suomen virallinen lista)	10
French Albums (SNEP)	23
German Albums (Offizielle Top 100)	8
Hungarian Albums (MAHASZ)	7
Irish Albums (Official Charts)	19
Italian Albums (FIMI)	39
New Zealand Albums (RMNZ)	4
Norwegian Vinyl Albums (VG-lista)	5
Polish Albums (ZPAV)	32
Portuguese Albums (AFP)	5
Scottish Albums (Official Charts)	5
Spanish Albums (PROMUSICAE)	14
Swiss Albums (Schweizer Hitparade)	5
UK Albums (Official Charts)	5
UK Rock & Metal Albums (Official Charts)	1
US Billboard 200	5
US Top Alternative Albums (Billboard)	3
US Top Hard Rock Albums (Billboard)	1
US Top Rock Albums (Billboard)	2

=== Year-end charts ===
Year-end chart performance for Ohms
Chart (2020)	Position
US Top Album Sales (Billboard)	90
US Top Current Album Sales (Billboard)	68
US Top Alternative Albums (Billboard)	38
US Top Rock Albums (Billboard)	65
US Top Hard Rock Albums (Billboard)	31
