= Deftones (album) =

Studio album by Deftones
- Released: May 20, 2003
- Studios: Larrabee (West Hollywood); Studio X (Seattle); The Spot (Sacramento)
- Genres: Alternative metal; post-metal
- Length: 47:09
- Label: Maverick
- Producers: Terry Date; Deftones

Deftones chronology
White Pony (2000)	Deftones (2003)	B-Sides & Rarities (2005)

Singles from Deftones
- 1. "Minerva" Released: April 22, 2003; 2. "Hexagram" Released: August 26, 2003

Deftones is the fourth studio album by the American alternative metal band Deftones. Released on May 20, 2003, by Maverick Records, the album incorporates trip hop and shoegaze influences. It was the band's last release to be produced by Terry Date until Ohms in 2020. At a cost of $2.5 million, Deftones is the 13th most expensive album ever made.

== Musical style ==
Deftones is an eclectic album, with songs spanning many different ideas in diverse genres. Most of the album's songs make extensive use of Stephen Carpenter’s low G# tuning. On the other hand, the track "Lucky You" is a dark, soft, trip hop piece featuring DJ Crook from Moreno's side project Team Sleep and vocalist Rey Osburn of Tinfed. A grand piano and toy piano were featured in the mournful "Anniversary of an Uninteresting Event", while "Minerva" has been described as a shoegaze song.

== Critical reception ==
Professional ratings
Aggregate scores
Source	Rating
Metacritic	74/100
Review scores
Source	Rating
AllMusic	3/5 stars
Blender	3/5 stars
Dotmusic	8/10
Entertainment Weekly	B
NME	8/10
Pitchfork	4.7/10
Playlouder	2.5/5 stars
Q	4.5/5 stars
Rolling Stone	4/5 stars
Spin	3/5 stars

According to the review aggregator Metacritic, Deftones received "generally favorable reviews" based on a weighted average score of 74 out of 100 from 12 critic scores. However, the album was not as well received as its predecessor White Pony, and, at the time of its release, it received some reviews ranging from marginal to negative from critics. Stephen Thomas Erlewine of AllMusic described the album as a disappointment compared to the rest of the band's catalogue.

Rolling Stone stated, "This is metal that crushes, then soothes; collapses, then soars... Deftones just blow open the possibilities".

In 2016, Jonathan Dick of NPR Music retrospectively noted the album's "trip-hop nuances" and included the album as an example of Deftones' varied catalogue, stating that "Deftones' catalogue reads like a case study in how a band can translate influences into a sound that's definitively their own." The track "Minerva" was placed at spot No. 12 in Consequence of Sound's article "The Top 20 Deftones Song", with Jon Hadusek claiming that "[in] a way, Deftones brought shoegaze to the alternative metal mainstream with 'Minerva', a crushingly heavy, textured jam indebted to Siamese Dream-era Smashing Pumpkins and Hum". Hadusek further stated that the track was "far-and-away the best track" of the self-titled album and that the track "hints at the dreamier directions" that Deftones would continue to explore.

The A.V. Club gave the album a moderate score but criticized the band for returning to their heavy style, instead of the more soft and artistic style of its predecessor, White Pony.

Spin also gave the album a marginal score, but complained about the album's notable darkness, saying, "On their fourth album, Deftones are sad as hell, and they're not gonna take it anymore; this is less an 11-song album than a single long-form mope".

Pitchfork reacted negatively to the album, describing the album as pretentious and as a bizarre departure from their previous work, claiming "Deftones sounds more like a band in the throws of a mid-life crisis than a group of musicians that could be called the 'Radiohead of Metal'. This is music on the fence-post of popular pining and dulled experimentation, an anachronistic addition to an otherwise respectable discography, and it will be remembered as such."

Playlouder gave the album a negative review, criticizing the album's droning melodic songwriting structures, proclaiming: "it's why this album almost completely fails to deliver on that promise. When Chino's not screaming, he's generally busy turning 'Deftones' into 'Tonedef', improvising a series of randomly-pitched moans which seem never to have shared so much as a rehearsal room with their generic metal backing, let alone a chord sequence."

During a 2020 interview with Metal Injection, frontman Chino Moreno expressed his dissatisfaction of the album for both personal and musical reasons.

== Commercial performance ==
Deftones debuted at No. 2 on the Billboard 200, behind Staind's 14 Shades of Grey, one spot higher than its predecessor. The album also debuted at No. 1 on the Canadian Albums Chart, selling 10,700 copies in its first week of release in Canada. The album sold 167,000 copies in its first week of release in America. Despite the strong initial sales, it quickly became apparent that the album did not match the success of White Pony after its first month; the band's label described it as a commercial disappointment. The album was certified gold by the RIAA on July 7, 2003. To date, it was the highest-charting debut for any album by the band; it would manage to sell over 492,000 copies in the U.S. by 2005.

== Track listing ==
All tracks are written by Deftones except "Lucky You"; by Deftones and DJ Crook.

No.	Title	Length
1.	"Hexagram"	4:09
2.	"Needles and Pins"	3:23
3.	"Minerva"	4:17
4.	"Good Morning Beautiful"	3:28
5.	"Deathblow"	5:28
6.	"When Girls Telephone Boys"	4:36
7.	"Battle-Axe"	5:01
8.	"Lucky You" (featuring Rey Osburn)	4:10
9.	"Bloody Cape"	3:38
10.	"Anniversary of an Uninteresting Event"	3:57
11.	"Moana"	5:02
Total length:		47:09

== Personnel ==
Deftones

- Chino Moreno – vocals, rhythm guitar
- Stephen Carpenter – lead guitar; 5-string bass on "Needles and Pins"
- Abe Cunningham – drums
- Chi Cheng – bass
- Frank Delgado – samples, keyboards

Additional personnel

- Rey Osburn – additional vocals on "Lucky You"

Production

- Terry Date – production, engineering, mixing
- Deftones – production
- Greg Wells – co-production, arrangements (all except "Lucky You", "Anniversary of an Uninteresting Event", and "Moana")
- Pete Roberts – Pro Tools engineering, additional engineering
- Sam Hofstedt – assistant engineering
- Sean Tallman – assistant mix engineering
- Tom Baker – mastering
- Chino Moreno – creative direction
- Frank Maddocks – creative direction, art direction, design
- James R. Minchin III – band photography
- Kinski Gallo – additional photography
- Nick Spanos – additional photography

== Charts ==
=== Weekly charts ===
2003 weekly chart performance for Deftones
Chart (2003)	Peak position
Australian Albums (ARIA)	4
Austrian Albums (Ö3 Austria)	20
Belgian Albums (Ultratop Flanders)	29
Belgian Albums (Ultratop Wallonia)	18
Canadian Albums (Billboard)	1
Danish Albums (Hitlisten)	21
Dutch Albums (Album Top 100)	22
Finnish Albums (Suomen virallinen lista)	9
French Albums (SNEP)	14
German Albums (Offizielle Top 100)	8
Irish Albums (IRMA)	14
Italian Albums (FIMI)	17
New Zealand Albums (RMNZ)	2
Norwegian Albums (VG-lista)	18
Portuguese Albums (AFP)	4
Scottish Albums (Official Charts)	6
Spanish Albums (AFYVE)	28
Swiss Albums (Schweizer Hitparade)	19
Swedish Albums (Sverigetopplistan)	23
UK Albums (Official Charts)	7
US Billboard 200	2

2025 weekly chart performance for Deftones
Chart (2025)	Peak position
Greek Albums (IFPI)	60

=== Year-end charts ===
Year-end chart performance for Deftones
Chart (2003)	Position
US Billboard 200	174

== Certifications ==
Certifications for Deftones
Region	Certification	Certified units/sales
Australia (ARIA)	Gold	35,000^{‡}
Canada (Music Canada)	Gold	50,000^{^}
United Kingdom (BPI)	Silver	60,000^{^}
United States (RIAA)	Gold	500,000^{^}
^{^} Shipments figures based on certification alone.^{‡} Sales+streaming figures based on certification alone.

== See also ==
- List of most expensive albums
