= Frank Delgado =

American keyboardist & turntablist (born 1970)

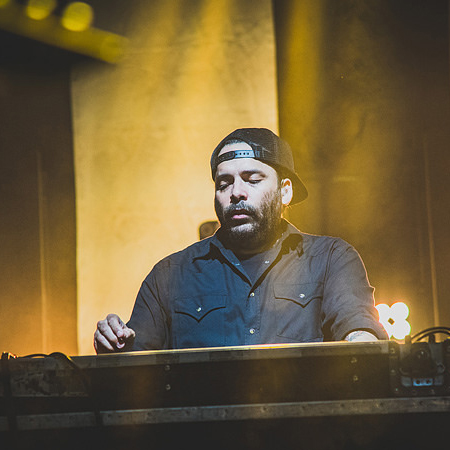
- Delgado performing in 2017

Background information
- Born: Frank Mirelez Delgado; November 29, 1970 (age 55); Los Angeles, California, US
- Genres: Alternative metal; experimental rock; post-metal; shoegazing; dream pop; alternative rock; art rock; nu metal
- Occupation: Musician
- Instruments: Keyboards; turntables
- Years active: 1998–present
- Member of: Deftones; Decibel Devils; Socialistik

Frank Delgado (born November 29, 1970) is an American musician, best known as the keyboardist and turntablist for alternative metal band Deftones.

== Career ==
=== Deftones ===
Delgado came to the attention of Deftones as a member of the Sacramento-based hip-hop group Socialistik, a frequent opener for Deftones. He appeared as a guest performer on Deftones' first two albums, Adrenaline and Around the Fur, and was formally inaugurated into the group before their third release, White Pony.

His playing rarely features traditional scratching or beat juggling. Instead, he tends to use turntables as samplers to integrate subtle sounds and textures into the music. He prefers to create his own samples, rather than use prerecorded sample banks or borrow sounds from other artists.

Starting with the band's eponymous fourth album, Deftones, Delgado began to put more emphasis on keyboards and synthesizers.

=== Other activities ===
Delgado is a member of the disc jockey collective Decibel Devils.
