= Tim McCord =

American rock musician

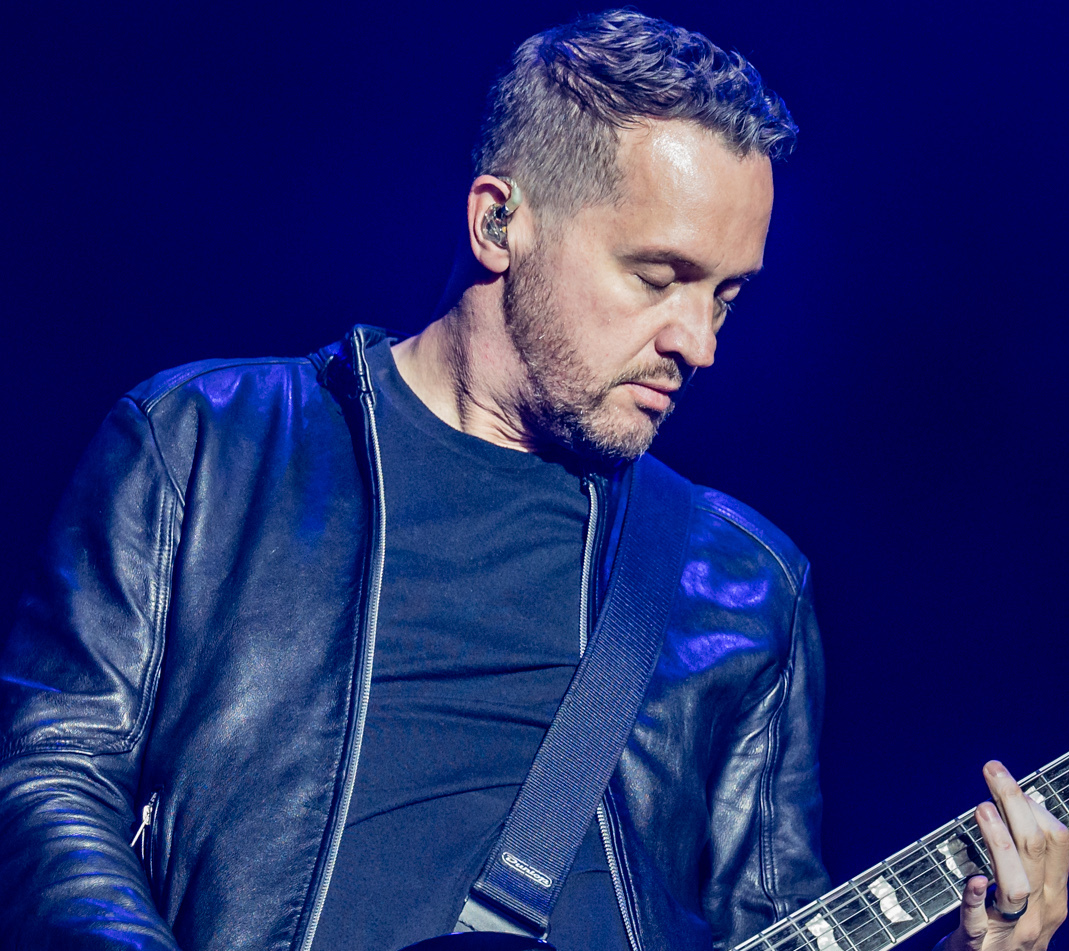
- McCord performing with Evanescence in 2023

Background information
- Born: June 28, 1979 (age 47); Sacramento, California, U.S.
- Genres: Alternative metal, rock
- Occupation: Musician
- Instruments: Bass, guitar
- Member of: Evanescence
- Formerly of: The Revolution Smile
- Website: evanescence.com

Timothy Todd McCord (born June 28, 1979) is an American musician. He is best known as a member of the rock band Evanescence, which he joined in 2006. He played bass for the band until 2022 when he switched to guitar. Previously, McCord played guitar for the band The Revolution Smile. McCord is also a member of the Japanese music label, Brave Wave Productions.

== Career ==
McCord was a guitarist for the band The Revolution Smile. In 2006, he joined Evanescence as their bassist. In 2022, he switched from bass to guitar.

McCord is a member of the Japanese music label, Brave Wave Productions.

== Band projects ==
- The Bloody Swords – guitar (1997–2000)
- The Revolution Smile – guitar (2000–2004)
- Quitter – bass, keyboards (2001–2004)
- The Snobs – guitar (2005–2008)
- Evanescence – guitar (2022–present); bass (2006–2022)
- Dust & Blood - bass (2025-present)
