= Kinski Gallo =

Kinski Gallo is a musician and visual artist based out of Los Angeles, California. From 2006 to 2011, he served as the frontman of the bilingual rock group Monte Negro. In 2014, Gallo launched a solo electronic music project under his own name. His debut single, "Cumbia del Corazón," was released in September 2014 and was featured on FIFA 15, a game by EA Sports.

== Early life ==
Kinski Gallo Rodríguez was born in Guadalajara, Mexico, and is one of eleven children. His father worked as a boxer, chef, and mariachi singer. Through his family and cultural background, Gallo was exposed to traditional Latin American music, including romantic ballads, cumbia, bolero, and norteño. He moved to the Venice neighborhood of Los Angeles in his early teens.

== Career ==
Gallo led the rock band Monte Negro, which was formed while he was in high school. He served as the group's lead vocalist, and his brother Rodax was also a member. In 2006, Gallo was a vocalist in the band Madrepore, which released the album Overblown. Rodax also participated in that project.

Monte Negro released its debut album, Cicatrix, in 2007; it was reissued in 2008. In 2009, the band released the EP Fugitives of Pleasure and Pasajeros, followed in 2010 by the double album Cosmic Twins. The band announced its disbandment in early 2012.

Following the group's breakup, Gallo began a solo project, developing a style he described as "Paisatronica," a fusion of tropicália and electronic music. He later collaborated with Juan Covarrubias of Daddy Yankee and Robi Draco, formerly of Phantom Vox Studios in Hollywood, California, to form the EDM project M.O.M. (Music of Mars).

In 2013, Gallo resumed performing and recording with his brother Rodax under the name Gallo. In 2014, his visual artwork was exhibited at the ROAM Gallery in Topanga, California.

== Discography ==
=== LPs ===
- Zentro (2025)

=== EPs ===
- The Ballad of the Sun Tower (2025)
- The Waltzing Fool (2025)
- Eidolons (2025)
- Mirage (2025)
- Venado (2022)

=== Singles ===
- "Cumbia del Corazon" (2014)
- "Animal Farm" (2025)
- "Chinga" (2025)
