= Chino Moreno =

American singer (born 1973)

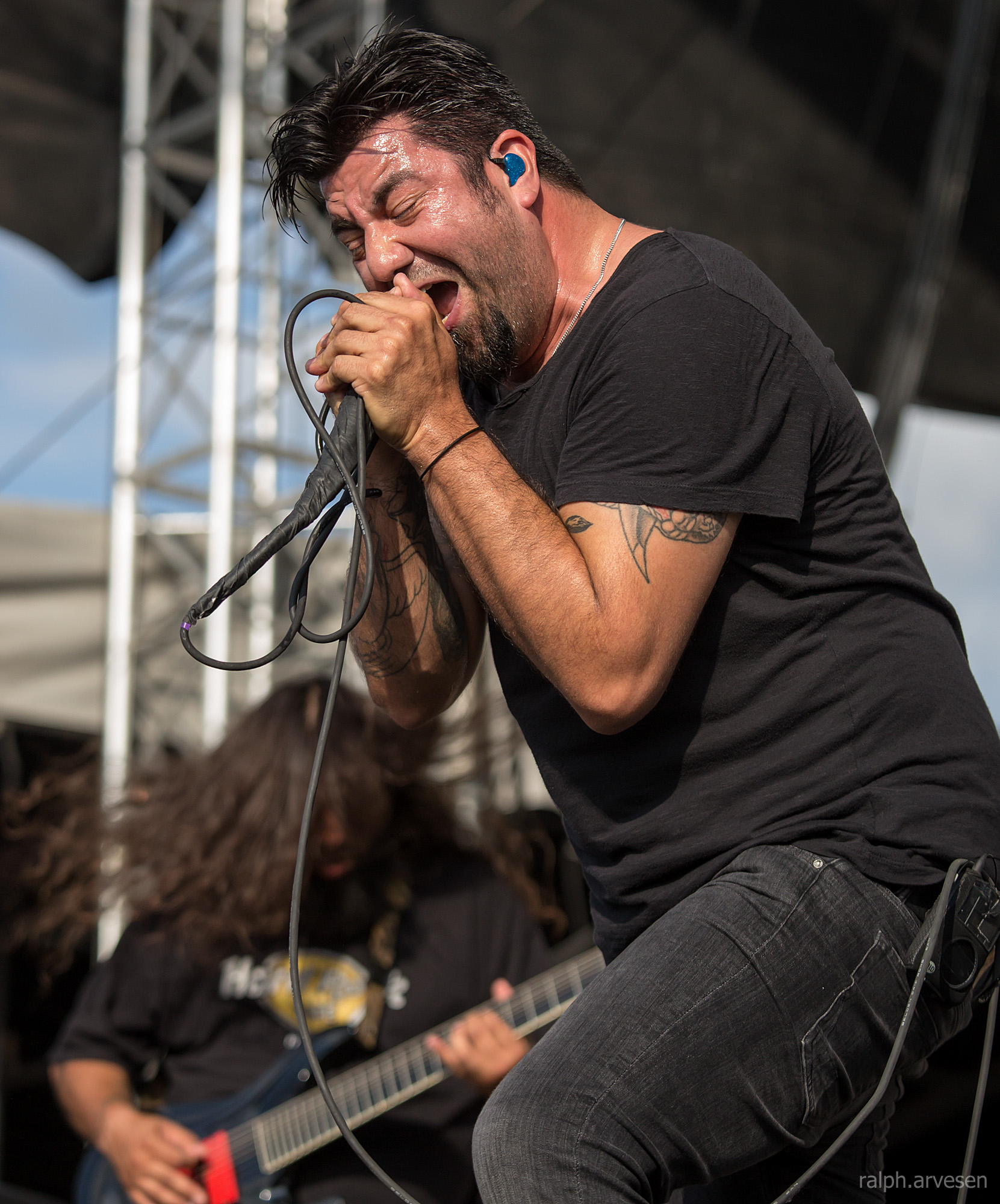
- Moreno with Deftones at River City Rockfest in San Antonio, 2014

Background information
- Born: Camillo Wong Moreno; June 20, 1973 (age 53); Sacramento, California, U.S.
- Genres: Alternative metal; art rock; alternative rock; post-metal; post-hardcore; nu metal; experimental rock; post-rock; electronic rock; dream pop
- Occupations: Singer; musician; songwriter
- Instruments: Vocals; guitar
- Years active: 1988–present
- Member of: Deftones; Team Sleep; Crosses; Palms; Saudade

Camillo "Chino" Wong Moreno (born June 20, 1973) is an American musician who is best known as the lead vocalist and primary lyricist of the alternative metal band Deftones. He is also a member of the side-project groups Team Sleep, Crosses, and Palms.

Moreno is known for his dramatic tenor voice and distinctive screams. In 2007, he was placed at number 51 in Hit Parader's "Top 100 Metal Vocalists of All Time".

== Early life ==
Moreno was born in Sacramento, California, the second of five children. His mother is of Mexican and Chinese descent and his father is Mexican. The nickname "Chino" is the Spanish-language term for Chinese people, a moniker "given to him as a kid by his uncles because he looked predominantly Asian, when most Mexicans are mestizo."

He grew up in the Oak Park area and attended C. K. McClatchy High School, where he met Abe Cunningham and Stephen Carpenter, with whom he founded Deftones in 1988. Before becoming a professional musician, Moreno had a day job at Tower Records' shipping department.

== Career ==
=== Deftones ===
Circa 1988, Moreno started jamming regularly with his middle-school friends Abe Cunningham and Stephen Carpenter, leading to the formation of Deftones. Within two years, the group started playing club shows. They were signed to Maverick Records after one of their representatives saw them play in Los Angeles. Their first commercially released album was Adrenaline (1995), produced by Terry Date. While the album wasn't an instant success, extensive touring, word-of-mouth, and Internet promotion built the band a dedicated fan base, as well as helping Adrenaline to sell over 220,000 copies without the singles "7 Words" and "Bored" (as well as their music videos) receiving any airplay. For 1997's Around the Fur, the band expanded its sound, spending more time with Date, and giving more thought to the album's production. The record was highly anticipated and propelled Deftones to fame in the alternative metal scene on the strength of radio and MTV airplay for the singles "My Own Summer (Shove It)" and "Be Quiet and Drive (Far Away)".

White Pony was released in 2000 to critical acclaim and unprecedented commercial success. Frank Delgado had become a full-time band member, adding new elements to the band's music, while Moreno himself contributed guitar lines in addition to vocals. With influences of new wave, dream pop, and trip hop, the album is considered a turning point for the band in terms of experimentation. Singles "Change (In the House of Flies)" and "Digital Bath" supported the album's release. A single entitled "Back to School (Mini Maggit)" was released as a rap-influenced reinterpretation of White Pony's closing track, "Pink Maggit". While commercially successful and a fan favourite, the band have previously strongly objected to its publication, although it is unclear whether this is still the case. White Pony was subsequently re-released with "Back to School (Mini Maggit)" as the album's opening track. For the song "Elite", Deftones received the 2001 Grammy Award for Best Metal Performance.

In 2001, Moreno developed a throat injury due to heavy screaming and was forced to miss at least four shows. He suffered inflammation on his right vocal cord and partial paralysis of the left vocal cord. During the rest of their supporting tour, bassist Chi Cheng took over vocal duties that required screaming while Moreno sang the softer melodies of the lyrics, despite recommendations by doctors to hold off from singing to allow time for recovery as well as rumors that the band would be cancelling the remaining stretch of the tour with Godsmack and Puddle of Mudd.

The eponymous Deftones was released in 2003, and saw the band being praised for the heavy album's progression and originality in the midst of declining creativity in contemporary metal. Moreno was quoted as saying, "It's all on record. We told motherfuckers not to lump us in with nu metal because when those bands go down we aren't going to be with them." B-Sides & Rarities saw release in 2005, bringing together unreleased and obscure material accrued since 1995. 2006's Saturday Night Wrist was completed after a protracted and tumultuous recording process, nearly leading to Moreno's departure from Deftones. Later he said it had been "a seriously unhealthy experience" and he "wasn't sure if [he] was going to return" at the time the band was on a self-imposed hiatus. After eventually finishing the album in early 2006, Moreno claimed it to be more of a compromise between all of the members' influences, ranging from their brutal and brooding heavy signature seen on Adrenaline and Around the Fur to the more experimental sound heard on White Pony and Deftones. However, the band saw a significant decrease on the album's first week sales compared to their two previous releases.

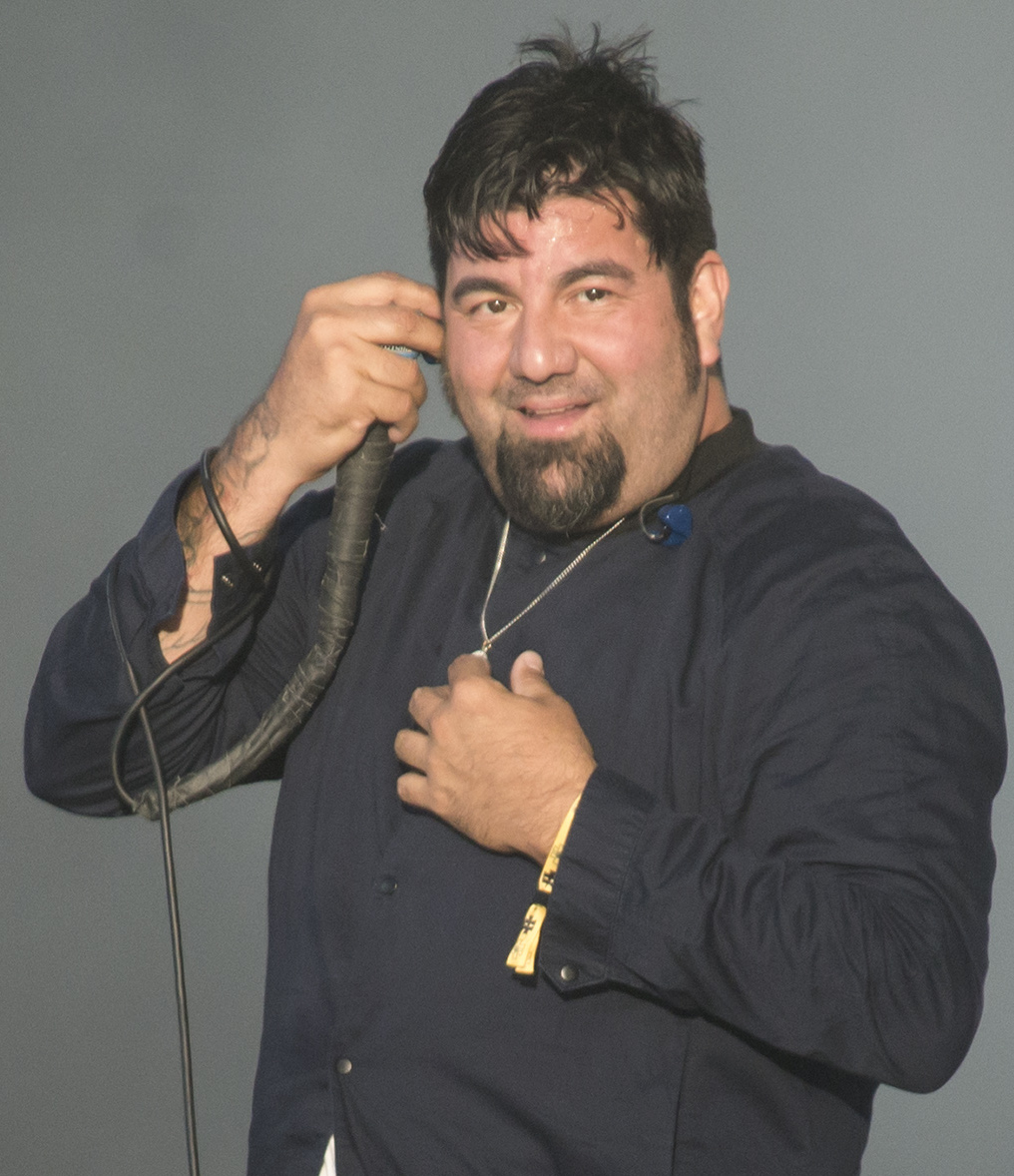
Moreno at Hellfest 2018

Deftones were working on an upcoming album with the working title Eros, when bassist Chi Cheng was severely injured in a car accident in November 2008, remaining in a minimally conscious state and later a partially conscious state up until his death in April 2013. In 2009, the group had recruited Sergio Vega for his replacement and announced an indefinite delay of Eros, stating "... we realized that this record doesn't best encompass and represent who we are currently as people and as musicians." With Vega, the group began work on a new album, Diamond Eyes, which was released on May 4, 2010. It saw the release of the popular singles "Rocket Skates", "You've Seen the Butcher" and "Diamond Eyes". In November 2012, Deftones released their seventh studio album, titled Koi No Yokan. "Leathers", "Tempest" and "Swerve City" came out as its singles. The band released their eighth studio album Gore in 2016. In 2020, Deftones released their ninth studio album, called Ohms, which garnered significant critical praise.

=== Side projects ===
During the making of Deftones' White Pony, Moreno began work on a side project, Team Sleep. The group released their self-titled debut album in May 2005.

In March 2011, Moreno stated to be working on a new side project known as Crosses, featuring Far guitarist Shaun Lopez and Chuck Doom. Moreno described the project as "minimal and soothing, and it's sort of like the stuff I like listening to when I'm not screaming my head off." Their debut self-titled EP was released on August 2, 2011. EP 2 appeared the next year.

In April 2012, it was announced that Moreno had joined former Isis members Jeff Caxide, Aaron Harris and Bryant Clifford Meyer in a side project by the name of Palms. Their first album was released on June 25, 2013.

In April 2016, Moreno teamed up with guitarist Dr. Know of Bad Brains, drummer Mackie Jayson (Bad Brains, Cro-Mags); jazz keyboardist John Medeski of Medeski, Martin, and Wood; and bassist Chuck Doom (Team Sleep, Crosses) to form the supergroup Saudade. They released their first single through BitTorrent Bundle on April 28, 2016.

Moreno has also made a number of guest appearances on numerous younger groups' songs, such as "Bender" by Sevendust, "Paralytic" by Dead Poetic, "Vengeance Is Mine" by Droid, "Caviar" by Dance Gavin Dance, "Surrender Your Sons" by Norma Jean, and "Reprogrammed to Hate" by Whitechapel. In 2009, Moreno recorded a song with Thirty Seconds to Mars to appear on their album This Is War, but was not finished. On May 2, 2010, he performed "The Kill" with 30 Seconds to Mars.

In June 2016, the Secret Solstice music festival announced that Moreno would perform at Thrihnukagigur in what will be the first ever public concert inside the magma chamber of a volcano.

In 2019, Moreno was approached to score the seventh episode of Hulu's Into the Dark horror anthology series, entitled "I'm Just F*cking with You".

== Artistry ==
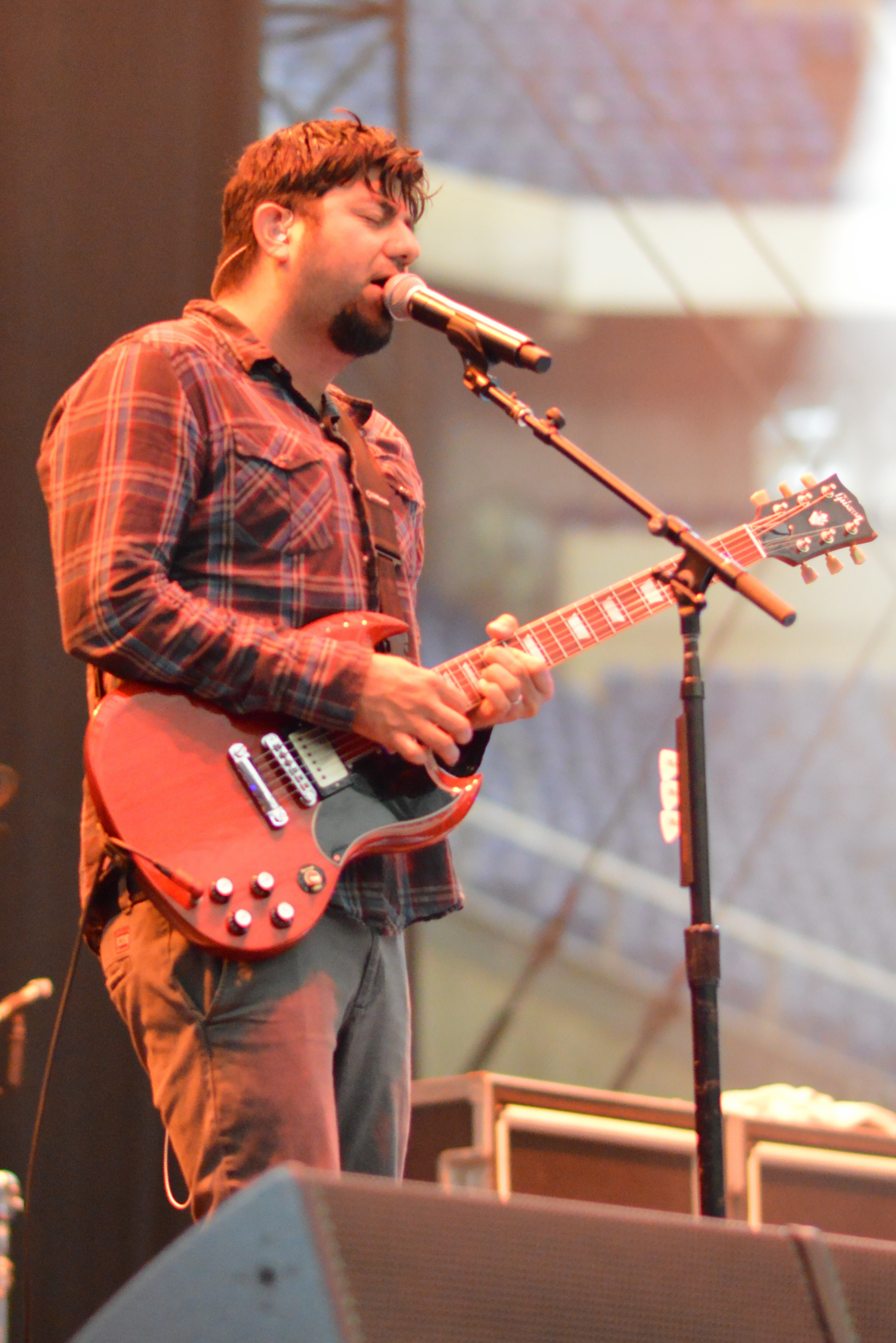
Moreno playing guitar in 2013

The biggest vocal influences on Moreno include Faith No More's Mike Patton, Bad Brains's H.R., the Smiths's Morrissey and Prince. His musical influences consist of a wide range of styles and genres, including the electronic bands OMD, Depeche Mode, Thompson Twins and the Human League. Other inspirations include the Cure, Bad Brains, PJ Harvey, the Smiths, My Bloody Valentine, Cocteau Twins, Public Enemy, Duran Duran, the Smashing Pumpkins, Portishead, Helmet, Jawbox, Faith No More, Slayer, Hum, Kool Keith, Alice in Chains, Tool, Girls Against Boys, Jane's Addiction and Weezer. For Revolver he selected five non-metal records that influenced him: the Cure's Pornography, Helium's No Guitars, Mogwai's EP+2, My Bloody Valentine's Loveless and the Smashing Pumpkins' Siamese Dream. He also made a list of his thirteen favourite albums for The Quietus, containing Small Craft on a Milk Sea by Brian Eno, Sunset Mission by Bohren und der Club of Gore, Fever Ray's self-titled album, Venus Luxure No.1 Baby by Girls Against Boys, Turn on the Bright Lights by Interpol, You'd Prefer an Astronaut by Hum, Saturdays = Youth by M83, Black Noise by Pantha du Prince, Love Deluxe by Sade, Talkie Walkie by Air, Born to Mack by Too Short, The Blue Moods of Spain by Spain and Standards by Tortoise.

In an August 1998 interview with Spin, Moreno stated "I was one of those kids who thought heavy metal was devil music. I can't say I'm really a metal fan or a hip hop fan, cause there's so many crappy bands out there. I just like a little bit of everything. I think other people are starting to think that way too." Regarding the influence of female artists such as PJ Harvey, Moreno said he was aware that people considered him to be gay, adding, "I really love girly stuff."

In relation to his often ambiguous yet image-heavy poetic lyrics, he said, "[Sometimes] my lyrics don't deal with specific topics. I write down on paper the feelings of the moment, it's not easy to explain the contents of the lyrics or give a logical sense to the words. What I write is also a reaction to the music we make, so the Deftones' sound is not pop, it doesn't communicate happy feelings. Paradoxically my favorite songs of the album talk about love, in a clearly different view."

=== Guitar playing ===
During the early years of Deftones, Stephen Carpenter served as the band's sole guitarist, but this changed following the Around the Fur record cycle when Carpenter moved to Los Angeles from Sacramento, where the band had always written and recorded their material. With Carpenter absent, Moreno began playing guitar during early writing sessions for what became White Pony. Moreno appreciated playing guitar because it allowed him to "put out emotions [...] without having to speak words or having to talk about something specific." As co-guitarists, Moreno and Carpenter focus on "fill[ing] up the space" left open by each other's playing, which is often determined by their differing tastes in equipment, with Moreno using traditional six-string guitars to juxtapose parts in higher registers compared to Carpenter's down-tuned seven- and eight-string guitars. Moreno said, "I think the main thing we try to do is keep it dynamic." Following the release of Gore, Premier Guitar characterized their sound as one of "swirly delays, sonic soundscapes, and bone-crushing chunk." Moreno spearheaded Deftones' guitar work on Private Music, as Carpenter was struggling from the effects of an undiagnosed case of Type 2 diabetes at the time.

Moreno was initially reluctant to play guitar live, but Carpenter insisted early on that anything Moreno played on a record he would also play during shows. While Moreno's ability to balance his roles as singer and guitarist live have improved over the years, he prioritizes setlists that minimize his need to play guitar.

=== Equipment ===
Moreno describes himself as a minimalist when it comes to gear. When he first took up guitar playing, he used one of Carpenter's six-string Jackson guitars, which he used to write songs like "Change (In the House of Flies)", "Digital Bath", and "RX Queen". This guitar was followed by a Jackson Viper, which had a Gibson SG-style body. Moreno liked the guitar, but had always wanted a genuine SG and bought what became his primary guitar, a 1996 SG Standard with an off-white finish that he added an Eazy-E sticker to. His primary backup is also an off-white SG Standard. Moreno describes SGs as "the most comfortable guitar for me," primarily for their lower weight.

Guitar amplifiers Moreno has used include the Rivera Tre Reverb and Orange Dual Terror. His effects pedals include the MXR Carbon Copy delay, Boss DC-2 Dimension Chorus, Eventide H9 Harmonizer, and TC Electronic Ditto Looper. In 2025, Kirk Hammett's pedal brand KHDK released a signature pedal for Moreno, the Digital Bath, which combines delay and filter modulation effects.

== Collaborations ==
- "Wicked" – Ice Cube cover from Life Is Peachy by Korn (1996)
- "Savory" – Jawbox cover from Soon by Far (1997)
- "Will To Die" – from In This Defiance by Strife (1997)
- "First Commandment" – from Soulfly by Soulfly (1998)
- "Bender" – from Home by Sevendust, credited as "Pony One" (1999)
- "(Rock) Superstar" – from Skull and Bones by Cypress Hill (2000)
- "Pain" – from Primitive by Soulfly (2000)
- "Things!" – from Hesher by Hesher (2001)
- "Ashamed" – from Never a Dull Moment by Tommy Lee (2002)
- "Dangergirl (Legwork Mix)" – from Designated Rivals by Tinfed (2003)
- "Feed the World (Do They Know It's Christmas?)" feat. Far – Band Aid cover from A Santa Cause: It's a Punk Rock Christmas by various artists (2003)
- "The Hours" – from White People by Handsome Boy Modeling School (2004)
- "Red Sky" – Thrice (appeared during the band's live set at the KROQ Almost Acoustic Christmas in 2005)
- "Paralytic" and "Crashing Down" – from Vices by Dead Poetic (2006)
- "Zombie Eaters" – Faith No More cover from The Undercover Sessions by Ill Niño (2006)
- "Rock for Light" – from Family Compilation Vol. 3 by Bad Brains (2006)
- "A Day in the Life of a Poolshark" – from Strange We Should Meet Here by Idiot Pilot (2006)
- "Fistful of Nothing" – from Runs Astray by Atomic Six (2007)
- "Vengeance is Mine" – from Droid by Droid (2007)
- "Keep Calm and Carry On" – Astrological Straits by Zach Hill (2008)
- "Wall" – from HAKAI by Wagdug Futuristic Unity (2008)
- "Caviar" – from Dance Gavin Dance by Dance Gavin Dance (2008)
- "Surrender Your Sons..." – from The Anti Mother by Norma Jean (2008)
- "Reprogrammed To Hate" – from A New Era of Corruption by Whitechapel (2010)
- "Only One" – from A Public Disservice Announcement by Methods of Mayhem (2010)
- "If I Could" – from All 6's And 7's by Tech N9ne (2011)
- "Right Outside" – from Beautiful Things by Anthony Green (2012)
- "RAZORS.OUT" – from The Raid: Redemption by Mike Shinoda and Joseph Trapanese (2012)
- "Hexes" feat. Bassnectar – from Resident Evil: Retribution by Tomandandy (2012)
- "Embers" – from VII: Sturm und Drang by Lamb of God (2015)
- "Brief Exchange" – from Dark Nights: Metal soundtrack (2018)
- "Lift Off" – from Post Traumatic by Mike Shinoda featuring Machine Gun Kelly (2018)
- "Disparan (Fill the Skies)" by Como Asesinar a Felipes (2018)
- "Shadows & Light (featuring Chelsea Wolfe)" – from Shadows & Light by Saudade (2019)
- "Hit Me Where It Hurts (Toro y Moi Remix)" – from Standing At The Gate: Remix Collection by Caroline Polachek (2020)
- "Geronimo" – from Neon Shark vs Pegasus by Trippie Redd (2021)
- "Anti-Life" – from Dark Nights: Death Metal by HEALTH (2021)
- "Bloodbath" – from Remember That You Will Die by Polyphia (2022)

Moreno also featured in the low-budget video for the song "Carpe Diem" by fellow Sacramento hardcore act Will Haven. In 2007, he produced their album The Hierophant. Moreno makes a brief cameo in Limp Bizkit's alternate video for their 1997 single Counterfeit, seen on the single's bonus disc.

== Personal life ==
Moreno has been married twice. He was married to his first wife from 1994 to 2006; they had two children. He married his second wife in 2012; the couple has one daughter. Moreno and his family have resided in Bend, Oregon since 2013.

Moreno had been a frequent smoker for most of his life; however, he reports that he quit in 2007.

== Discography ==
=== With Deftones ===
- Adrenaline (1995, Maverick/Warner Bros.)
- Around the Fur (1997, Maverick/Warner Bros.)
- White Pony (2000, Maverick)
- Deftones (2003, Maverick)
- Saturday Night Wrist (2006, Maverick)
- Eros (recorded in 2008 but unreleased)
- Diamond Eyes (2010, Warner Bros./Reprise)
- Koi No Yokan (2012, Warner Bros./Reprise)
- Gore (2016, Reprise)
- Ohms (2020, Reprise)
- Private Music (2025, Warner Bros./Reprise)

=== With Team Sleep ===
- Team Sleep (2005, Maverick)
- Woodstock Sessions Vol. 4 (2015)

=== With Crosses ===
- EP 1 (2011, self-published)
- EP 2 (2012, self-published)
- Crosses (2014, Sumerian Records)
- Permanent Radiant (2022, Warner Records)
- Goodnight, God Bless, I Love U, Delete., (2023, Warner Records)

=== With Palms ===
- Palms (2013, Ipecac)
