= Shaun Lopez =

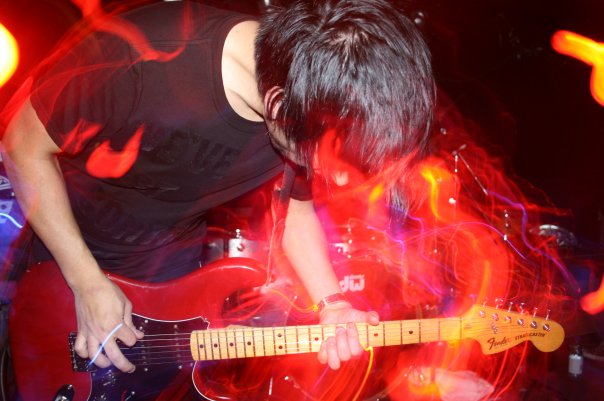
- Lopez in 2008

Background information
- Born: Shaun Michael Lopez
- Genres: Alternative rock, emo, indie rock, punk rock, electronica
- Occupations: Musician, producer, composer
- Instruments: Guitar, keyboard, sampler, vocals
- Years active: 1991–present
- Labels: Epic, Geffen, Vagrant
- Member of: ††† (Crosses)
- Formerly of: Far, The Revolution Smile

Shaun Michael Lopez is an American music producer, composer, and musician.

== Life and career ==
Lopez was a founding member and guitarist for post-hardcore band Far.

After a number of local releases, including their first demo tape, Sweat A River, Live No Lies, and two independent albums Listening Game and Quick, they signed to Epic/Immortal Records and released their major label debut, Tin Cans With Strings To You.

Their second major label LP, Water & Solutions, was released in 1998. Thanks to the single, "Mother Mary", they attracted a large cult following. The more melodic sound showcased on this album is increasingly cited as an influence on present-day "emo rock" bands (i.e. Thursday, Biffy Clyro, Jimmy Eat World). Certainly, it was a departure from their earlier, much more hardcore sound, though it is still far from the emo-pop that it would quickly come to inspire.

After their split in 1999, Lopez briefly played in an early version of Rival Schools, headed by former Quicksand frontman, Walter Schreifels. He also auditioned for a spot in Foo Fighters, a job that was ultimately given to Chris Shiflett of No Use For A Name/Me First and the Gimme Gimmes.

Shortly thereafter, Lopez picked up the microphone and formed The Revolution Smile, which, after putting out the self-produced At War with Plastic EP, and self-produced full-length, We Are In This Alone, was signed to Geffen Records. In 2003, they released Above The Noise, which was produced by Shaun and Dave Sardy (producer of Far's Water & Solutions), and mixed by Andy Wallace. They toured across United States and Europe, and were featured on Ozzfest and Van's Warped Tour. A third self-produced album entitled Summer Ever was released in September 2006.

In addition to his production work with The Revolution Smile, he has produced a number of other bands, including Giant Drag, The Black Pacific, and Deftones.

In 2009, a Far reunion was announced. Several live shows were played, and an album produced by Lopez was released on May 25, 2010. Their Lopez-produced cover of Ginuwine's hit "Pony" made it to the top 40 in modern rock charts. He has also mixed B-Sides for Deftones sixth studio album, Diamond Eyes.

In 2011, Lopez formed ††† (Crosses) with Chuck Doom and Deftones frontman Chino Moreno. The group played their first shows on a short tour in California, including cities Pomona, San Diego, Sacramento, and San Francisco. Crosses played in the Lollapalooza Chile festival on March 31 - April 1, 2012. They also played in the Quilmes Rock festival on April 3, 2012.

Since 2024, Lopez has toured occasionally with Deftones, performing Chino Moreno's guitar parts, so he can focus on vocals.

== Personal life ==
Shaun lives in Los Angeles, CA with his wife Amy Chance. He owns and works out of The Airport studio.

== Discography ==
=== Production, Songwriting, Mixing ===
Artist	Title	Format	Year	Credit	Label	Ref
Offset	KIARI	Album	2025	Producer, Composer	Motown Records	
Bambie Thug	REDRUM	Single	2025	Producer, Composer	Spinefarm	
Fever 333	Darker White	Album	2024	Producer, Composer	Century Media	
Cassyette	This World Fucking Sucks	Single	2024	Producer, Composer	23 Recordings	
The Warning	Qué Más Quieres	Single	2024	Composer	Lava Records, Republic Records	
††† (Crosses)	Tunnel Lights - ††† (Crosses) remix	Single	2024	Remixer	Loma Vista Recordings	
††† (Crosses)	Goodnight, God Bless, I Love U, Delete.	Album	2023	Producer, Composer	Warner Records	
††† (Crosses)	One More Try	Single	2022	Producer	Warner Records	
††† (Crosses)	PERMANENT.RADIANT	EP	2022	Producer, Composer	Warner Records	
Aespa	Black Mamba	Single	2022	Producer, Composer	SM Entertainment	
††† (Crosses)	Goodbye Horses	Single	2021	Producer	Warner Records	
††† (Crosses)	The Beginning of the End	Single	2020	Producer	BMG	
notbigdyl.	Psycho Heart!	Single	2018	Producer, Composer	Capitol CMG	
Mike Shinoda	Post Traumatic	Album	2018	Producer	Warner Records	
MAN WITH A MISSION	Chasing the Horizon	Single	2018	Producer, Composer	Sony Music Entertainment (Japan)	
French Montana	Whiskey Eyes	Single	2017	Additional Production, Composer	Coke Boys, Bad Boy, Epic Records	
Colourus	Ivory	Album	2016	Producer, Mixer, Composer	Craft Recordings	
Senses Fail	Pull the Thorns from Your Heart	Album	2015	Producer, Composer	Epitaph Records	
Chon	Grow	Album	2015	Mixer	Sumerian Records	
††† (Crosses)	††† (Crosses)	Album	2014	Producer, Composer, Mixer	Sumerian Records	
versa	VERSA	EP	2014	Producer	Independent	
Dawn Golden	Still Life	Album	2013	Mixer	Downtown Records	
Senses Fail	Renacer	Album	2013	Producer, Composer	Staple Records, Workhorse Music Group	
VersaEmerge	Another Atmosphere	Album	2012	Producer	Fueled by Ramen	
Rob Zombie	Dragula - ††† remix	Single	2012	Producer, Remixer	Geffen Records	
††† (Crosses)	EP ††	EP	2012	Producer, Composer, Mixer		
††† (Crosses)	EP ††	EP	2011	Producer, Composer, Mixer		
††† (Crosses)	Batman: Arkham City - The Album	Album	2011	Producer, Composer, Mixer	WaterTower Music	
Whitechapel	A New Era of Corruption	Album	2010	Engineer	Metal Blade Records	
Far	At Night We Live	Album	2010	Producer, Composer	Vagrant Records	
The Black Pacific	The Black Pacific	Album	2010	Producer, Mixer	SideOneDummy Records	
Deftones	Diamond Eyes	Album	2010	Mixer	Warner Bros. Records	
Far	Pony	Single	2008	Producer, Composer, Mixer		
Dead Sara	The Airport Sessions	EP	2008	Producer, Engineer, Mixer		
Secondhand Serenade	A Twist in My Story	Album	2008	Mixer	Glassnote Records	
We the Living	Heights of the Lonely	Album	2007	Engineer		
Demon Hunter	Storm The Gates of Hell	Album	2007	Audio Engineer, Audio Production, Engineer, Guitar Engineer, Guitar Producer, Producer, Theremin	Solid State Records	
Will Haven	The Hierophant	Album	2007	Producer, Mixer	Bieler Brothers Records	
Saosin	Voices	UK 7"	2007	Engineer	Capitol Records	
Deftones	Saturday Night Wrist	Album	2006	Producer, Composer	Warner Bros. Records	
Lupe Fiasco	Lupe Fiasco's Food & Liquor	Album	2006	Composer	Atlantic Records	
Tycho	Past Is Prologue	Album	2006	Mixer	Merck Records	
Giant Drag	Hearts and Unicorns	Album	2006	Producer, Engineer	Kickball Records	
The Revolution Smile	Summer Ever	Album	2003	Producer, Composer, Mixer	Geffen Records	
The Revolution Smile	Above The Noise	Album	2003	Producer, Composer, Mixer	Geffen Records	
The Revolution Smile	We Are In This Alone	Album	2002	Producer, Composer, Mixer		
The Revolution Smile	At War with Plastic	Album	2001	Producer, Composer, Mixer		

=== Musician ===
==== Full albums ====
- ††† - Goodnight, God Bless, I Love U, Delete. (2023)
- ††† - ††† (Crosses) (2014)
- Far - At Night We Live (2010)
- The Revolution Smile - Summer Ever (2006)
- The Revolution Smile - Above The Noise (2003)
- The Revolution Smile - We Are In This Alone (2002)
- Far - Water & Solutions (1998)
- Far - Tin Cans With Strings To You (1996)
- Far - Quick (1994)
- Far - Listening Game (1992)

==== EPs ====
- ††† - EP †† (2012)
- ††† - EP † (2011)
- The Revolution Smile - At War with Plastic (2001)
- Far - Soon (1997)

==== Promos ====
- Far - The System (1998)
- Far - Mother Mary (1998)
- Far - Love, American Style (1996)
- Far - What I've Wanted To Say (1996)
- Far - In The Aisle, Yelling (1996)

==== 7"s ====
- Far - Mother Mary (1998)
- Far - Far / Incubus split w/ Water and Solutions (1997)
- Far - Far Does Madonna (w/ Sea Pigs) (1996)
- Far - Boring Life (1995)
