= Crosses (band) =

American band

- Also known as: †††
- Origin: Los Angeles, California, U.S.
- Genres: Dark wave; dream pop; witch house; electronic rock; industrial rock; gothic rock; post-punk
- Years active: 2011–present
- Labels: Warner; Sumerian; Rise
- Members: Chino Moreno; Shaun Lopez
- Past members: Chuck Doom

Crosses (usually stylized as †††) is an American musical side project of Deftones singer Chino Moreno and Far guitarist Shaun Lopez, based in Los Angeles and formed in 2011.

== History ==
=== Debut EPs and self-titled release (2011–2014) ===
Having recorded together previously, Deftones singer Chino Moreno began recording with childhood friend and neighbor Shaun Lopez of the band Far, as well as Chuck Doom. Moreno said that the project was "minimal and soothing and it's sort of like the stuff I like listening to when I'm not screaming my head off." With a tentative title of Crosses as the name of the project, they began recording for over four hours a day, completing nearly 16 songs with plans to self-release a series of EPs.

Recorded at Airport Studios in Los Angeles, their debut EP was released for free on August 2, 2011, with a higher quality version made available for purchase on their website. Duff McKagan, of Velvet Revolver and Loaded, contributed additional bass to the song "This Is a Trick" while Chris Robyn of Far performed live drums on the EP. Dino Campanella of the rock band Dredg has also been a live drummer for the band. Crosses contributed a previously unreleased song titled "The Years" to the Batman: Arkham City – The Album, the soundtrack to the game of the same name. It was also featured in the game's Joker trailer. A second EP from Crosses was released on January 24, 2012. In 2012, Crosses played Lollapalooza Chile in Santiago as well as the Quilmes Rock festival in Buenos Aires, Argentina.

Crosses released a vinyl single, including the tracks "Option" and "Telepathy" from their first two EPs, for Record Store Day 2012. The band also released an official remix of the Rob Zombie song, "Dragula", appearing on Zombie's 2012 album Mondo Sex Head. At the end of 2012, "Telepathy" appeared on the soundtrack for video game Need for Speed: Most Wanted. A postulated third Crosses EP was not released, and Moreno put Crosses temporarily on hold while he concluded work with Deftones (the album Koi No Yokan, issued in November 2012) and another side project, Palms, with ex-members of Isis (releasing their debut album, Palms, in June 2013).

In September 2013, Crosses signed with Sumerian Records. In October 2013, Crosses announced that a full-length album was set to be released on November 26, 2013, through Sumerian, and also posted the new track "The Epilogue" online for streaming. On November 25, the day before the intended release date, the new track "Bitches Brew" was posted online for streaming with an accompanying music video directed by Raul Gonzo, with the announcement that the album would be released on February 11, 2014. Crosses' eponymous debut contains remastered versions of all songs from the previous two EPs as well as five new tracks (essentially, what would have been EP 3). The track order intermingles new tracks and songs from both EPs. On April 19, 2014, for Record Store Day, Crosses reissued the first two EPs as well as EP 3, all on colored 10-inch vinyl. In 2014, Crosses appeared as part of the Australian music festival Soundwave in Adelaide, followed by a US spring tour.

=== New material and Permanent Radiant (2020–2022) ===
On December 24, 2020, Crosses released a cover of Cause and Effect's "The Beginning of the End", marking the first release from the band since 2014. Exactly one year later on December 24, 2021, Crosses released a cover of Q Lazzarus's song "Goodbye Horses". With the release of "Goodbye Horses" came the announcement that Crosses had signed a world-wide record deal with Warner Records with new music arriving in early 2022.

On March 18, 2022, Crosses released a double single called "Initiation/Protection", followed in October by "Day One/Vivien". After the launch of the "Vivien" music video, the duo announced the EP Permanent Radiant which was released on December 9, 2022. On December 23, 2022, Crosses released a cover of George Michael's "One More Try". It was the third cover song to follow their release date pattern of Dec 23–24

=== Goodnight, God Bless, I Love U, Delete. (2023–present) ===
On August 4, 2023, Crosses announced that their second full-length studio album Goodnight, God Bless, I Love U, Delete. would be released October 13, 2023, on Warner Records marking the band's first album with a major label. It is the same label which Chino Moreno's band Deftones is signed to. The lead single, "Invisible Hand", was released on the same day with a music video.

In October 2023, they announced their "Familiar World Tour", as well as doing a few international shows opening for Avenged Sevenfold.

== Style ==
The musical style of Crosses is often referred to as electronic, electronic rock, dark wave or dark pop, dream pop or witch house. However, Carson O'Shoney of Consequence of Sound and Daniel Brockman of The Boston Phoenix noted that Crosses only shares a resemblance to witch house in aesthetics and imagery, and not the group's actual music. O'Shoney said that Crosses' witch house influence is "noticeable just by looking at the tracklist—every song has at least one † in it. The name of the band is †††. The name of the EP is †. Everything about the EP points to witch house—until you listen to the actual music." The group's decision to use the imagery stems from Chino Moreno's interest in the art and mystique around religion. Moreno however also said, "I didn't want people to think we are a religious band, a satanic band or that we are a witch-house band. It's difficult using a religious symbol, but at the same time, I think in an artistic way, it can totally go somewhere else and I think we are kind of walking that line."

== Discography ==
=== Studio albums ===
List of studio albums, with selected chart positions
Title	Album details	Peak chart positions	
Title	Album details	US	AUS
Crosses	Released: February 11, 2014; Label: Sumerian; Formats: CD, LP, digital download	26	43
Goodnight, God Bless, I Love U, Delete.	Released: October 13, 2023; Label: Warner; Formats: CD, LP, CC, digital download, streaming	139	—

=== Extended plays ===
List of extended plays, with selected chart positions
Title	Album details	Peak chart positions
Title	Album details	US Heat
EP 1	Released: August 2, 2011; Label: Self-released; Formats: Digital download, 10"	—
EP 2	Released: January 24, 2012; Label: Self-released; Formats: Digital download, 10"	8
EP 3	Released: April 19, 2014; Label: Sumerian; Formats: 10"	—
Daytrotter Session - Mar 30, 2014	Released: April 15, 2014; Label: Daytrotter; Formats: Digital download	—
Permanent Radiant	Released: December 9, 2022; Label: Warner; Formats: CD, 12" digital download	—
Permanent Radiant Remixed	Released: July 7, 2023; Label: Warner; Formats: digital download	—
"—" denotes a recording that did not chart or was not released in that territory.

=== Singles ===
List of singles, with selected chart positions
Title	Year	Peak chart positions		Album
Title	Year	US Alt.	US Main.	Album
"Option" / "Telepathy"	2012	—	—	EP 1 / Crosses
"The Epilogue"	2013	27	40	Crosses
"The Beginning of the End" (originally by Cause and Effect)	2020	—	—	Non-album singles
"Goodbye Horses" (originally by Q Lazzarus)	2021	—	—	Non-album singles
"Initiation" / "Protection"	2022	—	—	Non-album singles
"Day One" / "Vivien"	2022	—	—	Permanent Radiant
"Sensation"	2022	—	—	Permanent Radiant
"One More Try" (originally by George Michael)	2022	—	—	Non-album single
"Invisible Hand"	2023	27	—	Goodnight, God Bless, I Love U, Delete.
"Light as a Feather"	2023	—	—	Goodnight, God Bless, I Love U, Delete.
"Big Youth" (featuring El-P)	2023	—	—	Goodnight, God Bless, I Love U, Delete.
"Pulseplagg"	2024	—	—	Goodnight, God Bless, I Love U, Delete.
"—" denotes a recording that did not chart or was not released in that territory.

=== Music videos ===
List of music videos, showing year released and directors
Title	Year	Director(s)
"Bitches Brew"	2013	Raul Gonzo
"The Epilogue"	2014	Raul Gonzo
"Initiation"	2022	Lorenzo Diego Carrera
"Protection"	2022	Lorenzo Diego Carrera
"Vivien"	2022	Shaun Lopez and Lorenzo Diego Carrera
"Sensation"	2022	Shaun Lopez and Lorenzo Diego Carrera
"Holier"	2022	Shaun Lopez and Lorenzo Diego Carrera
"Invisible Hand"	2023	Shaun Lopez and Lorenzo Diego Carrera
"Light as a Feather"	2023	Shaun Lopez and Lorenzo Diego Carrera
"Big Youth"	2024	Unknown

=== Compilation contributions ===
Title	Year	Album
"The Years"	2011	Batman: Arkham City – The Album
"Dragula" (Crosses Remix)	2012	Mondo Sex Head
"Tunnel Lights (Crosses Remix)"	2024	Undone EP
