= Crosses (Crosses album) =

Studio album by Crosses
- Released: February 11, 2014
- Recorded: 2013
- Studio: The Airport Studio, Los Angeles, California, US
- Genre: Electronic rock; dream pop; electronica; dark wave; witch house
- Length: 56:15
- Label: Sumerian
- Producer: Shaun Lopez; Crosses

Crosses chronology
EP 2 (2012)	Crosses (2014)	Permanent Radiant (2022)

Singles from †††
- 1. "The Epilogue" Released: November 11, 2013

Professional ratings
Aggregate scores
Source	Rating
Metacritic	74/100
Review scores
Source	Rating
AllMusic	3.5/5 stars
Alternative Press	4/5 stars
The Boston Globe	7/10
Clash	7/10
Drowned in Sound	9/10
Kerrang!	4/5 stars
Pitchfork	5.0/10

Crosses (stylized as †††) is the debut full-length album by the American musical group Crosses. The album was released on February 11, 2014, on Sumerian Records. The album contains remastered versions of songs from the band's previous two EPs (EP 1 and EP 2, respectively) as well as five new songs that were originally set to be released as EP 3. The album debuted at No. 26 on the Billboard 200 upon release. The album's sound reflects elements of electronic rock, nu gaze, dream pop, ambient, dark ambient, gothic rock, trip hop, dark wave, witch house and electronica.

== History ==
In September 2013, Crosses announced via Twitter that they were releasing their third EP on November 12 on Sumerian Records. In October 2013, Crosses announced that a full-length album was set to be released on November 26, 2013, on Sumerian, and also posted the new track "The Epilogue" online for streaming. The release date for the band's eponymous debut was later pushed back to February 11, 2014, and the new track "Bitches Brew" was posted online for streaming along with the announcement. On November 26, the date Crosses were originally scheduled to release their debut album, the band instead released a music video for "Bitches Brew", directed by Raul Gonzo. The album contains remastered versions of all songs from the previous two EPs as well as five new tracks (essentially, EP 3). The track order intermingles new tracks and songs from both EPs.

== Critical reception ==
Upon its release, Crosses received positive reviews from music critics. At Metacritic, which assigns a normalized rating out of 100 to reviews from critics, the album received an average score of 74, which indicates "generally favorable reviews", based on nine reviews. Allmusic reviewer Gregory Heaner wrote: "††† is a solid effort that stands on its own merit rather than simply cruising on the cultural cache of its members". The Boston Globe writer Ken Capobianco stated: "The music has a cinematic feel and ominous tone, as if the band is scoring a yet-to-be-made David Fincher film". Mike Diver of Clash wrote: "As while there’s ingredients enough here to have the listener expecting something savagely tearing at the envelope of experimentalism, Crosses proves to be a most-accessible collection – perhaps the most 'pop' record Moreno has released to date". He further added that the album "meets its pre-release hype head on, and comes away the winner".

Ian Cohen of Pitchfork gave the album a mixed review, stating: "While ††† may be on the same scale as Deftones, they’re not a replacement, and it stands to reason that Moreno can ascend to the heights of their previous work. But on †††, it’s like he never had wings".

== Track listing ==
Crosses track listing
No.	Title	Originally from	Length
1.	"This Is a Trick"	EP 1	3:07
2.	"Telepathy"	EP 2	3:35
3.	"Bitches Brew"	EP 3	3:28
4.	"Thholyghst"	EP 1	4:26
5.	"Trophy"	EP 2	3:53
6.	"The Epilogue"	EP 3	3:55
7.	"Bermuda Locket"	EP 1	3:42
8.	"Frontiers"	EP 2	4:01
9.	"Nineteen Ninety Four"	EP 3	4:17
10.	"Option"	EP 1	4:24
11.	"Nineteen Eighty Seven"	EP 2	3:11
12.	"Blk Stallion"	EP 3	3:06
13.	"Cross"	EP 1	2:52
14.	"Prurient"	EP 2	4:06
15.	"Death Bell"	EP 3	4:12
Total length:			56:15

Note: All tracks on the album have a † symbol in their title, as substitute for the letter "T"; "Cross" is simply labelled "†".

== Personnel ==
Crosses

- Chuck Doom
- Shaun Lopez
- Chino Moreno

Additional musicians

- Duff McKagan – additional bass on "This Is a Trick"
- Stephen Boettcher – mandolin assistance
- Molly Carson – phone call on "Frontiers"
- Chris Robyn (Far) – live drums
- Mackie Jayson – drums/loop on "Nineteen Ninety Four"

Production and artwork

- Eric Broyhill – mastering
- Crosses – production
- Brendan Dekora – assistant engineer
- Shaun Lopez – production, engineering, mixing
- Brooke Nipar – photography
- Eric Stenman – mix engineer

== Charts ==
Chart performance for Crosses
Chart (2014)	Peak position
Australian Albums (ARIA)	43
US Billboard 200	26
