= Aridjis =

Aridjis is a surname. Notable people with the surname include:

- Chloe Aridjis (born 1971), Mexican-American writer
- Eva Aridjis (born 1974), Mexican-American film director, daughter of Homero and sister of Chloe
- Homero Aridjis (born 1940), Mexican poet, writer, environmental activist, journalist, and diplomat
