= Goodbye Horses =

Single by Q Lazzarus
- B-side: "White Lines"
- Released: 1988; June 17, 1991
- Genre: Synth-pop; dark wave; new wave; dance
- Length: 6:28; 3:07 (single edit); 4:20 (7" version)
- Label: Mon Amie (US); All Nations (UK)
- Songwriter: William Garvey
- Producer: William Garvey

Music video
- "Goodbye Horses" on YouTube

"Goodbye Horses" is a song recorded by American singer Q Lazzarus. It was written by Q Lazzarus's bandmate, William Garvey, and released in 1988, with an extended version released three years later. It is a synth-pop, dark wave, new wave, and dance song with lyrics based on "transcendence over those who see the world as only earthly and finite" and androgynous vocals from Q Lazzarus.

After Q Lazzarus played a demo tape for Jonathan Demme while driving him in her taxi, which included a demo of "Goodbye Horses", he featured the song in his crime comedy film Married to the Mob (1988). It then became a cult hit after he used it in a scene of his film The Silence of the Lambs (1991), which was widely lauded for the usage. Since then, it has been used in various films, television series, and video games, often referencing its use in The Silence of the Lambs, and has been covered by numerous artists.

== Composition and writing ==
"Goodbye Horses"
The chorus of "Goodbye Horses" has androgynous vocals from Q Lazzarus and lyrics about horses based by its writer, William Garvey, on "transcendence over those who see the world as only earthly and finite".

"Goodbye Horses" was written by songwriter William Garvey and performed by Q Lazzarus, both of whom were bandmates in the band Q Lazzarus and the Resurrection. According to friends of Garvey, the two band mates had a tumultuous relationship with one another. Q Lazzarus disappeared from the public eye after the band disbanded in 1995, while Garvey died in 2009.

The song, a "haunting", "dreamlike" synth-pop, dark wave, new wave, and dance ballad, features Q Lazzarus's androgynous vocals, picked guitar, snare drums, and drum pads. Its lyrics were based by Garvey on "transcendence over those who see the world as only earthly and finite", with the "horses" in the song representing "the five senses from Hindu philosophy".

Evan Sawdey of PopMatters wrote that "Goodbye Horses" has a "strangely entrancing thump" and "sad, tragicomic elements" in the lyrics, describing it as "quirky". It was described by Tracy Moore in Vanity Fair as a "gothy, somber ode", and by Tyler Jenke of Tone Deaf as "rather creepy". AllMusic critic Ted Mills characterized the "peculiar" song as sounding "like the Associates meets OMD".

A music video was also made for the song in 1987, directed by Leslie Mentel.

== The Silence of the Lambs appearance ==
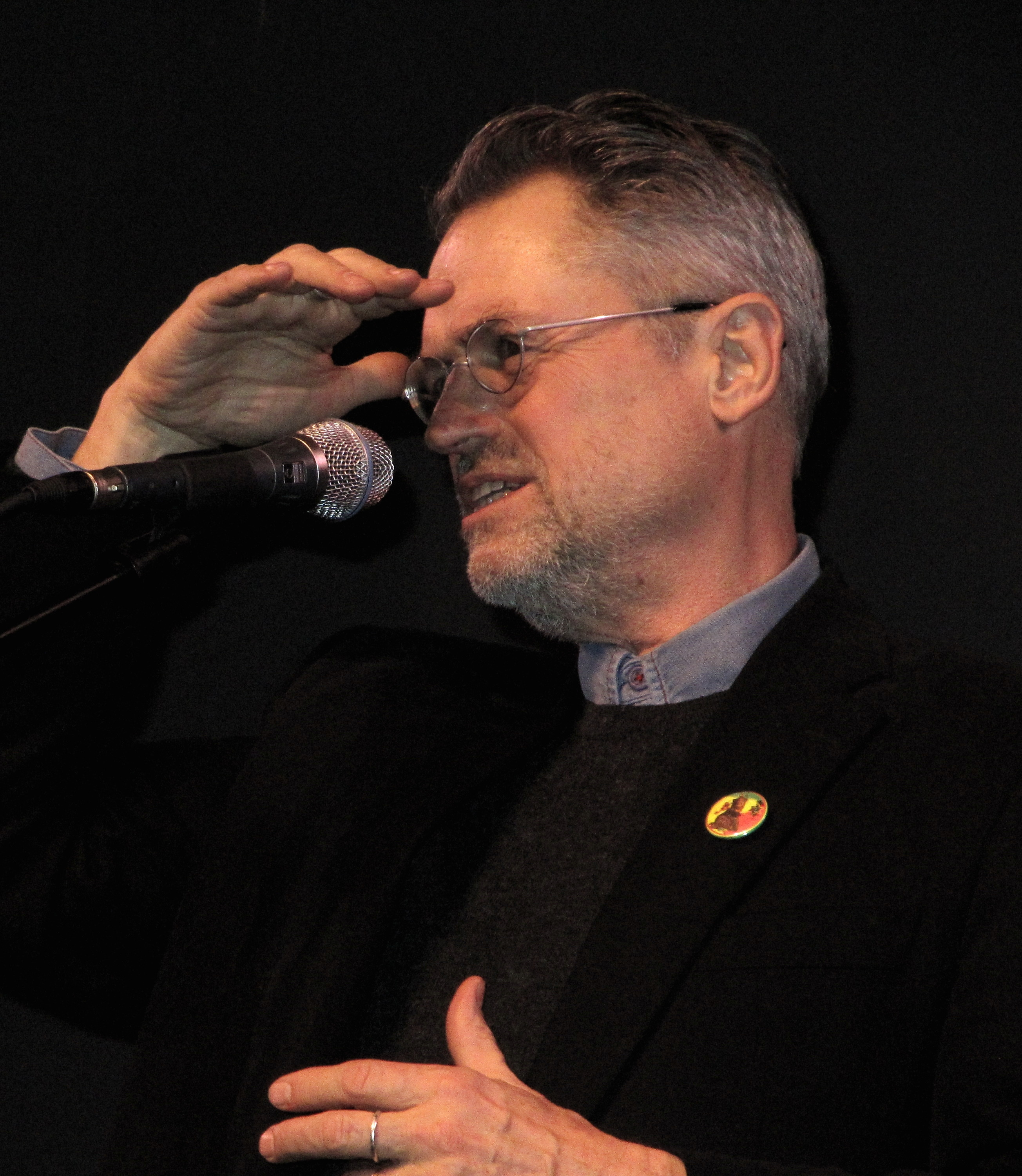
After being picked up in a taxi by Q Lazzarus, director Jonathan Demme used "Goodbye Horses" in his 1991 film The Silence of the Lambs, making it a cult hit.

In the 1980s, Q Lazzarus worked as a taxi driver in New York City and was unsigned, with record labels allegedly turning her away due to her dreadlocks. One day, in 1985, she picked up director Jonathan Demme and producer Arthur Baker in her taxi during a blizzard after the two finished doing the final mix on Little Steven's music video for his song "Sun City". After dropping off Baker, Q Lazzarus asked Demme if he was in the music business, then proceeded to play her demo tape, which included "Goodbye Horses". After listening to the tape, Demme was impressed, saying, "Oh my God, what is this and who are you?"

"Goodbye Horses" quickly became a cult hit after Demme used it in a scene from his 1991 film The Silence of the Lambs. In the scene, the film's antagonist, serial killer Buffalo Bill (portrayed by Ted Levine) puts on makeup in the mirror and plays with his nipple ring while his victim, Catherine Martin (Brooke Smith), attempts to escape from a deep pit. As the song plays, Buffalo Bill says to himself, "Would you fuck me? I'd fuck me. I'd fuck me so hard", and then begins dancing naked into a video camera with his penis and testicles tucked between his legs as Catherine cries in the background. "Goodbye Horses" was not in the script, and other songs by David Bowie and Mick Jagger were also considered for the scene. It was originally rehearsed to Bob Seger's 1980 song "Her Strut", but "Goodbye Horses" was eventually chosen, with Levine saying that it became "a little gentler", "stranger", and "more feminine" as a result.

=== Reception ===
Under the Radar and Time Out included the use of "Goodbye Horses" in The Silence of the Lambs on their lists of the best usages of songs in films. Lauren Down wrote for Under the Radar that it was "nigh on impossible" to separate "Goodbye Horses" from the film's scene, remarking they become "inextricable" once "he [Buffalo Bill] steps backwards in self-admiration". Howard Gorman of NME included the song on his list of songs that "became inextricably linked to the horror movies they were ultimately featured in", writing, "Regardless of how great a track this is...not even an MIB neuralyser can prevent us from recreating [Buffalo Bill's] unsettling mangina-meets-Bon Jovi moment in our heads whenever we hear it."

Bustle's Jack O'Keeffe wrote that Levine's performance was "etched into pop culture history through...the song 'Goodbye Horses' in other media". "Goodbye Horses" was included on Flavorwire's list of the creepiest soundtrack songs, where they wrote that the "infamous 'tuck' scene" in The Silence of the Lambs is "invariably associated" with the song. Billboard's Ron Hart wrote that the inclusion of "Goodbye Horses" in The Silence of the Lambs "immortalized" the song as a "classic". Time Out's Keith Uhlich labeled the song "enrapturing" and called the scene "a pop-cultural touchstone".

For The New York Times, Joe Coscarelli wrote that "Goodbye Horses" "adds an extra layer of eeriness" to what many consider the "indelible shot" of The Silence of the Lambs. Moore wrote that the scene was "played as a moment of dark degeneracy" as Q Lazzarus "warbles on the soundtrack". Max O'Connell of IndieWire called the use of "Goodbye Horses" in the film a "smart choice" due to how it foreshadowed Buffalo Bill's eventual failure and how its "melancholy...underscores how pitiful Bill's existence is, showing him trying to be something he's not just to get away from what he is".

=== Other appearances ===
Before using "Goodbye Horses" in The Silence of the Lambs, Demme included the song on the soundtrack for his 1988 film Married to the Mob. The Silence of the Lambs scene was parodied in an episode of Family Guy; Garvey later sued MGM for the show's use of the song. The song appeared in a scene from the 2006 film Clerks II, in which Jay and Silent Bob (played by Jason Mewes and Kevin Smith, respectively) parody the Silence of the Lambs scene. It was also later used in another parody of the scene from the 2019 film Jay and Silent Bob Reboot. "Goodbye Horses" also appeared in the 2012 slasher film Maniac, a remake of the 1980 film of the same name, as a tribute to the Silence of the Lambs scene. The CBS television series Clarice, a spin-off of The Silence of the Lambs, featured the song in a 2021 episode. In 2025, the song was featured in Monster: The Ed Gein Story.

"Goodbye Horses" was also featured in the video games Grand Theft Auto IV (2008) and Skate 3 (2010). As of 2021, the house in Perryopolis, Pennsylvania, used as Buffalo Bill's house in the film is a vacation rental, and, when visitors enter the basement, "Goodbye Horses" plays as a disco ball lights up.

== Track listings ==
=== Original release ===
- All Nations Records 7-inch single (1991)
1. "Goodbye Horses" (7" version) – 4:20
2. "White Lines" – 4:35
- All Nations Records 12-inch single (1991)
1. "Goodbye Horses" – 6:28
2. "Goodbye Horses" (7" version) – 4:20
3. "White Lines" – 4:35

=== Reissues ===
- Mon Amie Records 12-inch single (2013)
1. "Goodbye Horses" (Single Edit) – 3:07
2. "Goodbye Horses" (Cover version by Jon Hopkins and Hayden Thorpe) – 4:03
- Mon Amie Records 12-inch extended play (2017)
1. "Goodbye Horses" (Single Edit) – 3:07
2. "Goodbye Horses" (Demo 1) – 4:06
3. "Goodbye Horses" (Demo 2) – 4:56
4. "Tears of Fear" (Demo) – 4:12
5. "Transformation" (Demo) – 4:29
6. "Love Dance" (Demo) – 5:48
- Dark Entries 12-inch extended play (2025)
1. "Goodbye Horses" (Extended Mix) – 5:55
2. "Goodbye Horses" (Instrumental) – 5:54
3. "Hellfire" (Edit) – 4:45
4. "Summertime" (Edit) – 3:35
5. "Goodbye Horses" (Acapella) – 4:23

== Releases and legacy ==
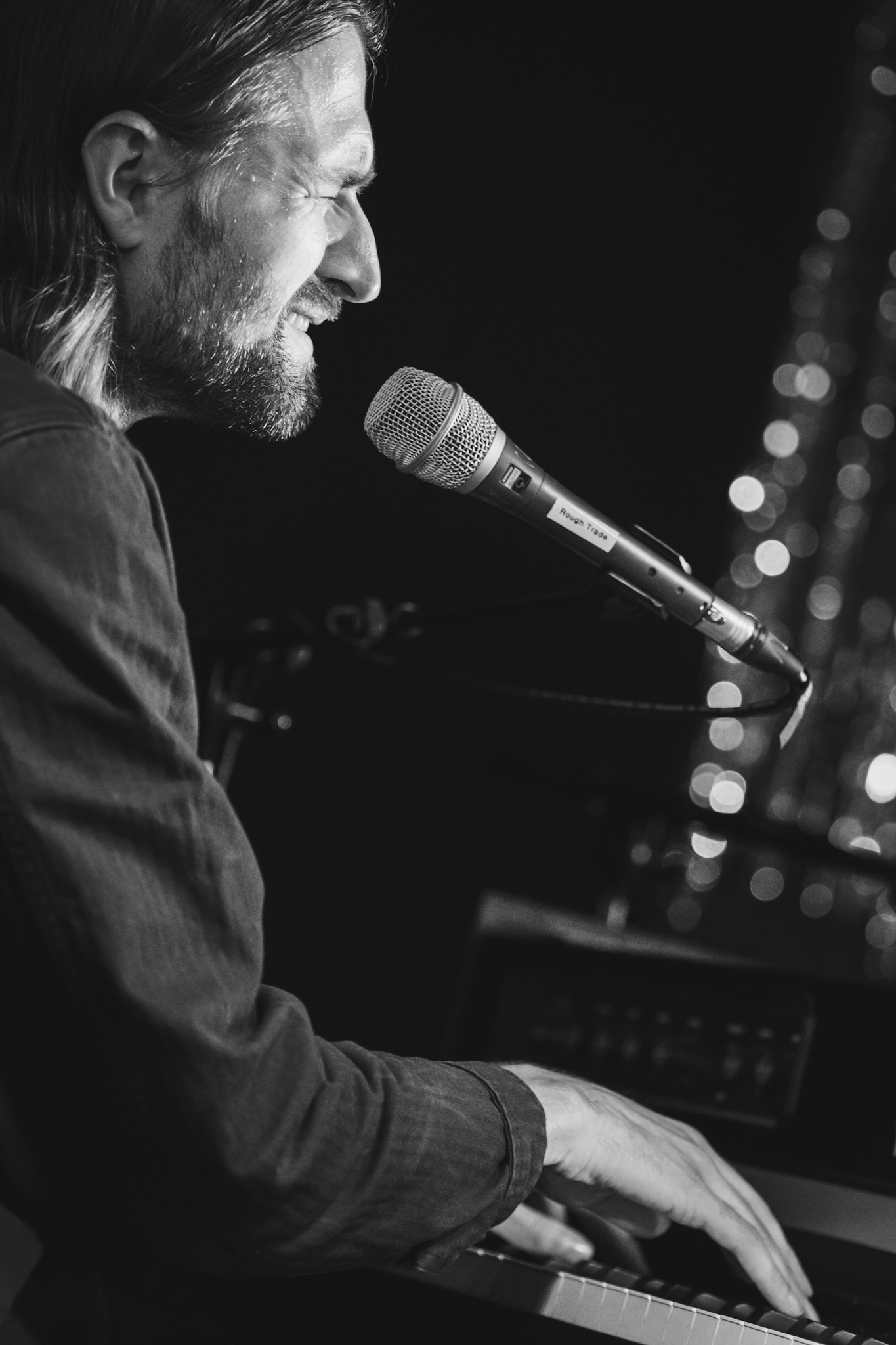
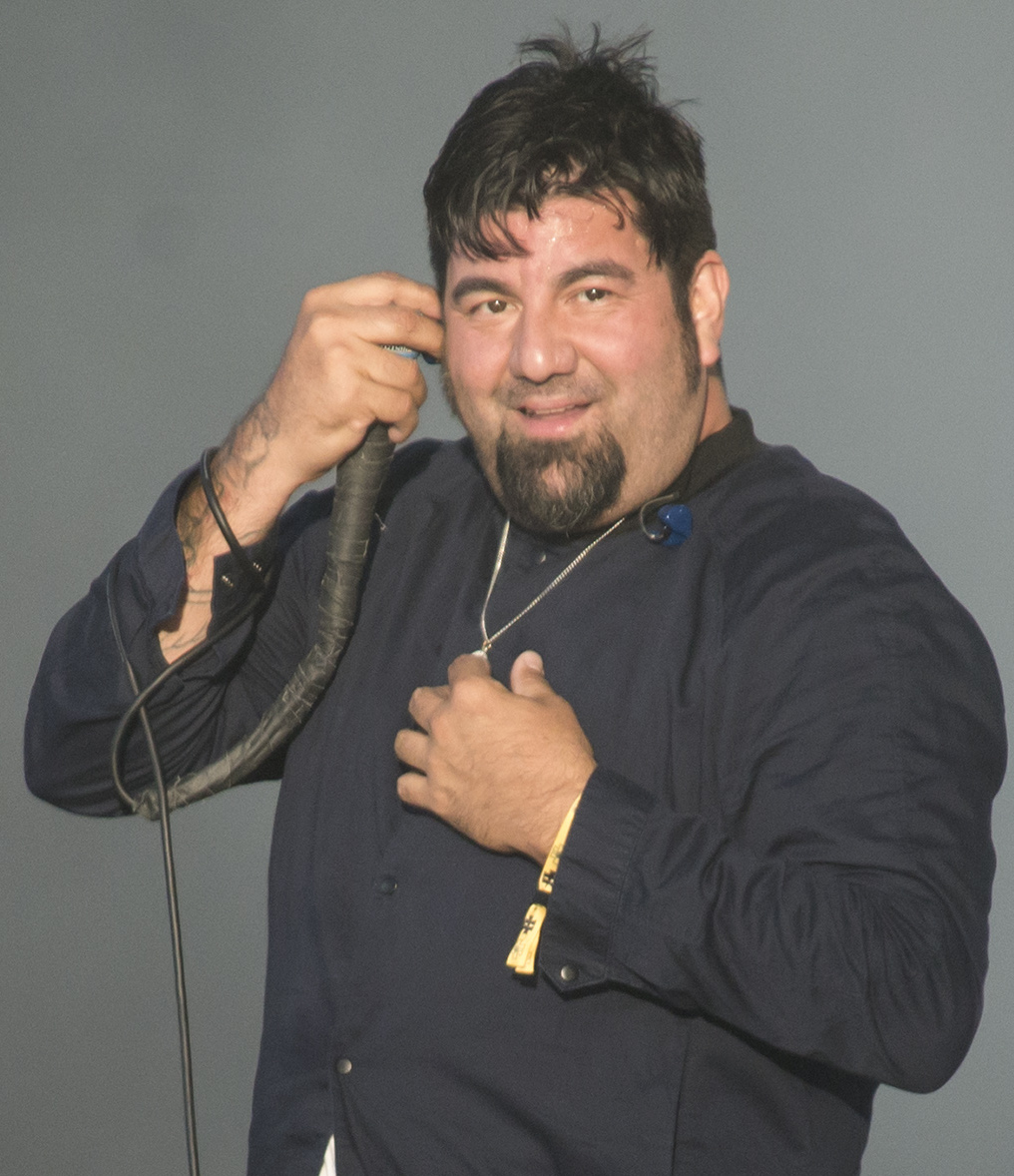
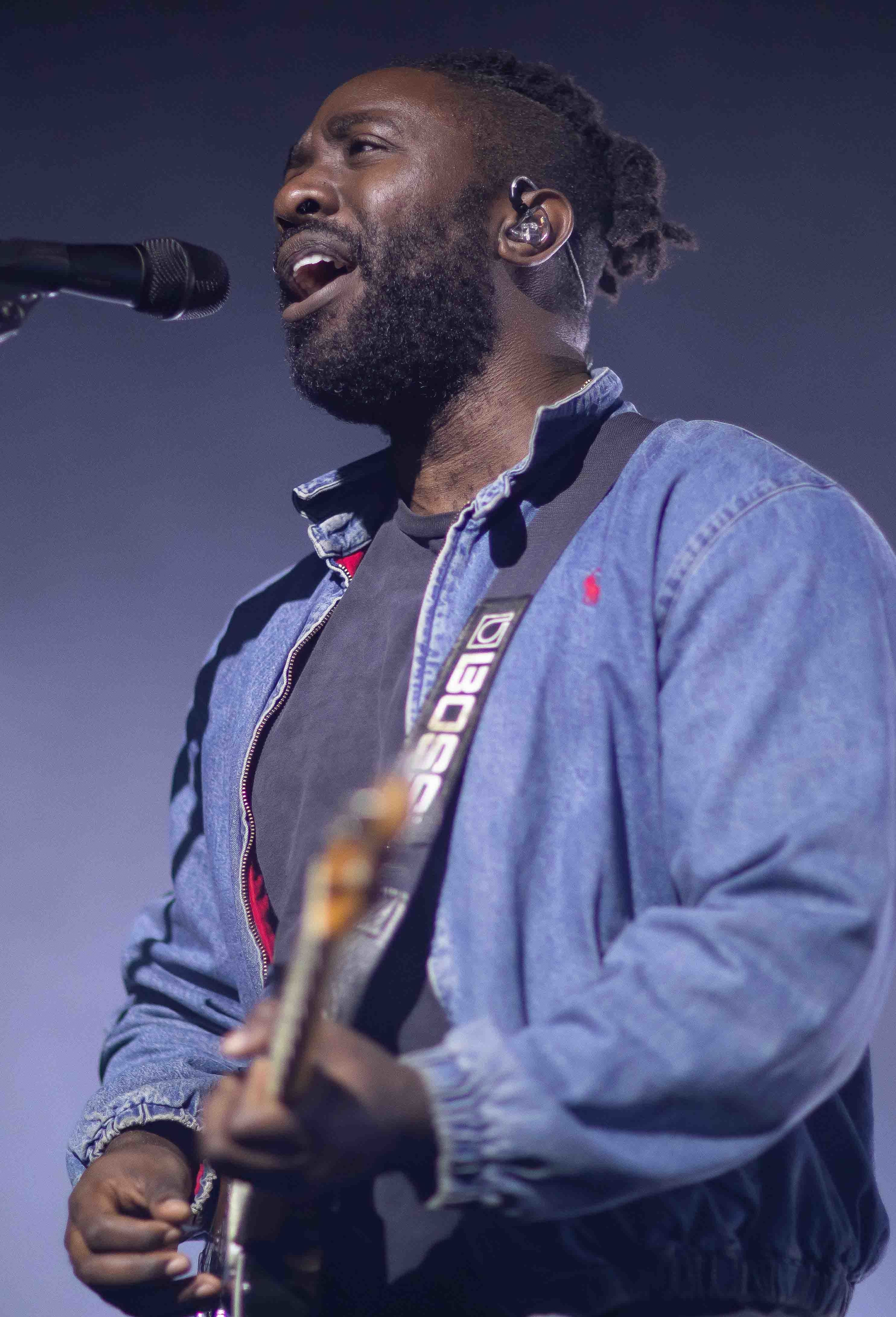
Hayden Thorpe (1st photo), Chino Moreno of Deftones (2nd photo), Kele Okereke (3rd photo) have all released covers of "Goodbye Horses".

"Goodbye Horses" was first released in 1988, and, in 1991, Q Lazzarus released an extended version of the song, with her song "White Lines" as a B-side.

In 2021, Ryan Leas wrote for Stereogum that the "cult icon status" of the "beloved" "Goodbye Horses" "seems to keep strengthening over the years". Q Lazzarus has been described as a one-hit wonder by IndieWire and The Daily Telegraph due to the success of "Goodbye Horses".

In 2024, Goodbye Horses: The Many Lives of Q Lazzarus, a documentary film directed by Eva Aridjis, included a new wave version of "Goodbye Horses".

Electronic band Fan Death released a disco cover of the song in 2009 for their first European tour, which was praised by The Fader as a "bang-up cover" with "deep and husky" vocals. In 2011, Kele Okereke of Bloc Party included a cover of "Goodbye Horses" on his EP The Hunter. In 2012, Psyche's cover of "Goodbye Horses" was released through Optimo. In 2013, American rock band the Delta Mirror included a cover of the song on their 2013 album Better Unsung, which the staff of Entertainment Weekly described as "appropriately Ian Curtis-y" and Zach Kelly from Pitchfork viewed as "more than a little silly".

A 25th anniversary re-release of the single, issued by Mon Amie Records in 2013, included a B-side of a minimalist cover of the song by Hayden Thorpe and Jon Hopkins. Their cover was later included on The Longest Day, a compilation album released by Mon Amie Records in 2020, with proceeds all going towards the Alzheimer's Association. In 2014, Crosses, the musical side project of Deftones singer Chino Moreno, Far guitarist Shaun Lopez, and bassist Chuck Doom, released a cover of "Goodbye Horses" shortly after releasing their self-titled debut album. In 2021, in anticipation of a new album, the band released a second cover of the song. Ryan Leas of Stereogum called the latter cover "a pretty faithful rendition" that was "a little grainer and more haunting" than the original. Rappers Sematary and Ghost Mountain released a witch house cover of "Goodbye Horses" on their 2020 collaborative album, Hundred Acre Wrist.

== Charts ==
"Goodbye Horses" did not enter any charts in 1991 and made its first appearance on component charts in the United Kingdom in 2025.

Chart (2025)	Peak position
UK Singles Sales (OCC)	43
UK Singles Downloads (OCC)	38
