= Q Lazzarus =

American singer (1960–2022)

Background information
- Also known as: Q
- Born: Diane Luckey; December 12, 1960; Neptune Township, New Jersey, U.S.
- Origin: New York City, U.S.
- Died: July 19, 2022 (aged 61) New York City, U.S.
- Genres: Rock; new wave; synth-pop; electronic; dark wave
- Occupations: Singer; songwriter
- Instrument: Vocals
- Years active: 1985–1995
- Labels: All Nations (UK); Mon Amie (US); Sacred Bones (US)
- Spouse: Robert Lange

Diane Luckey (December 12, 1960 – July 19, 2022), known professionally as Q Lazzarus, was an American singer. She is best known for her 1988 song "Goodbye Horses", which became a cult classic after being prominently featured in a scene from Jonathan Demme's 1991 film The Silence of the Lambs. Several of her songs were featured in other films directed by Demme before she disappeared from the public eye in the mid-1990s.

== Early life ==
On December 12, 1960, Diane Luckey, who was of African American heritage, was born in Neptune Township, New Jersey, the youngest of seven children.

While attending the Mount Pisgah Baptist Church in Neptune as a child, she sang in the Mount Pisgah Youth Choir. In 1976, at the age of 15, Luckey was inspired by a Broadway production of Bubbling Brown Sugar (1976) to pursue a music career. She followed up on her dream after graduating from Neptune High School in 1979, moving to New York City at the age of 18.

== Early career ==
After moving to New York in the late 1970s, Luckey soon started working as a backup singer and jingle writer at Sigma Sound Studios.

In the 1980s, Luckey worked as a taxi driver in New York City to make a living. During this time, she adopted the stage name Q Lazzarus and began making music with her band, Q Lazzarus and the Resurrection. The name 'Q' comes from the Alutiiq word Quiana, which means thank you, and 'Lazzarus' comes from the story of Lazarus in the Bible, whom Jesus raised from the dead. The band consisted of Lazzarus, songwriter William Garvey, and backup singers Gloriana Galicia and Janice Bernstein. According to Galicia, by 1985, Lazzarus was working in Chelsea as a live-in housekeeper and au pair for an English businessman named Swan, and the band would record vocal harmonies on cassette at Swan's house; Lazzarus also had a number of other day jobs at the time.

Lazzarus was repeatedly turned away by record companies, who insisted they could not market her because of her image. After picking up filmmaker Jonathan Demme in her taxi during a blizzard and asking him if he was in the music business, she played him her demo tape, to which he replied: "What is this and who are you?" Her song "The Candle Goes Away" was then included in Demme's film Something Wild (1986).

In 1987, Lazzarus and her good friend William Garvey recorded the song "Goodbye Horses" in his East Village apartment. The following year, thanks to Q's fateful meeting with Demme, the song was included in Demme's film Married to the Mob (1988). It later became a cult hit following its inclusion in a scene from Demme's film The Silence of the Lambs (1991) featuring the film's antagonist, serial killer Buffalo Bill.

== Time in London ==
The Q Lazzarus Band in London, from left to right: Shane Atlas, Jon Bouillot, Q Lazzarus and Mark Barrett

In 1988, Q Lazzarus moved to London with hopes of gaining recognition overseas, since her music career had struggled to take off in the United States. She formed an Aerosmith-style rock band and remained in London for five years. The band included Mark Barrett on guitar, Jon Bouillot on bass, and Shane Atlas on drums, with Bob Stamegna serving as their manager. All music was written by Bouillot and Barrett, with Q providing most lyrics and vocal melodies.

However, London record labels were also reluctant to sign the band, feeling that the group did not align with their image of a rock band. During this time, Q began a relationship with a promoter she met at the Hippodrome named Richard, who later became her manager. Richard's drug use eventually influenced Q to start using as well. Despite these challenges, Q and the band continued to perform at numerous venues throughout London.

== Return to the U.S. and disappearance ==
In the early '90s, Q received a call to appear in Jonathan Demme's next film, Philadelphia (1993), where she performed a cover of the Talking Heads song "Heaven". She and Richard moved to Philadelphia, where she tried once again to restart her music career in the U.S., collaborating with her friend Danny Z. Despite her efforts, record labels remained uninterested. Eventually, Richard left Q and returned to London. Q then fell into a deep depression and began heavily using crack cocaine.

By 1995, Q Lazzarus had vanished from the public eye. She moved into a friend's apartment in New York City but was later evicted. Now homeless and struggling with addiction, she turned to prostitution to support her drug habit. During this time, she met Robert Lange—who would later become her husband—and moved in with him. Shortly after, she discovered she was five and a half months pregnant. Following an arrest for selling drugs to use them, she was incarcerated at Rikers Island. Afterward, she entered a rehabilitation program and became sober, graduating from Daytop in 2001. She later began working as a driver operating coach buses.

== Later life ==
In 2015, while working as a bus driver in Staten Island, Q filed a lawsuit against a Hasidic bus company for not hiring female bus drivers. In August 2019, filmmaker Eva Aridjis met Lazzarus after getting picked up in her car service in New York City, and the two became friends and soon began working on a documentary about her life.

During the making of the documentary, she was planning to make a come back into the music industry, trying to get her old band back together. However, the COVID-19 pandemic caused those plans to be put on hold.

== Personal life and death ==
Luckey was married to Robert Lange, with whom she had two children, including son James Luckey-Lange, and resided in Staten Island. She had a stint working on a fishing boat in Alaska and taking an extended trip through South America.

In 2022, Luckey broke her leg and contracted sepsis. She died on July 19, 2022, at the age of 61. In March 2025, Aridjis's documentary, Goodbye Horses: The Many Lives of Q Lazzarus, was released in select movie theaters in the United States, with its soundtrack released by Sacred Bones Records a month prior. In December 2025, it was reported that her son James Luckey-Lange, 28, was imprisoned while backpacking in Venezuela, amid growing U.S.-Venezuela tensions. The following month Luckey-Lange was among the first US prisoners to be released by the Venezuelan government following the capture of Nicolás Maduro.

== Band members ==
Q Lazzarus Band:

- Q Lazzarus – vocals
- Mark Barrett – guitar (UK)
- Jon Bouillot – bass (UK)
- Shane Atlas – drums (UK)
- Rick Duce – drums (UK)

Other Collaborators

- Bill Garvey – songwriter (US)
- Gloriana Galicia – backing vocals (US)
- Janice Bernstein – backing vocals (US)
- Dan "Danny Z" Agren – backing vocals/dancer/collaborator (US)

== Discography ==
- "Goodbye Horses" (single) (1988/1991)
- Goodbye Horses: The Many Lives of Q Lazzarus (Music from the Motion Picture) (2025)

== Filmography ==
- Philadelphia (1993) – party singer
- Goodbye Horses: The Many Lives of Q Lazzarus (2025) self

== Music video ==
- "Goodbye Horses" (1987)
