= Youghiogheny Bank of Pennsylvania =

- U.S. National Register of Historic Places
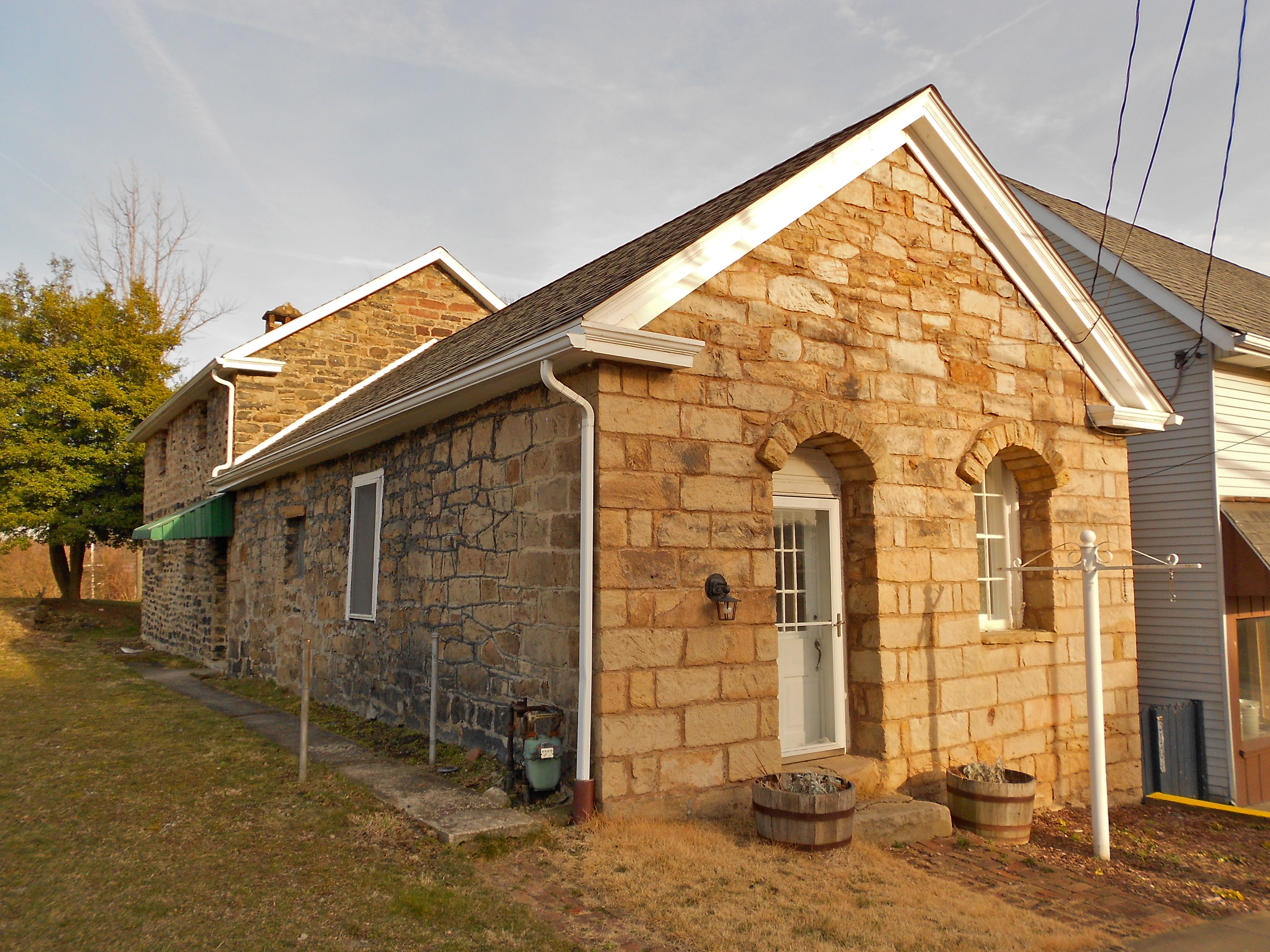

- Location within Pennsylvania Location within the United States
- Location: S. Liberty St., S of Washington Diamond, Perryopolis, Pennsylvania
- Coordinates: 40°5′12″N 79°45′3″W
- Area: less than one acre
- Built: c. 1817
- Architectural style: Early Republic
- NRHP reference No.: 97001245
- Added to NRHP: October 24, 1997

The Youghiogheny Bank of Pennsylvania, also known as the Old State Bank, is an historic bank building in Perryopolis, Fayette County, Pennsylvania, United States.

It was added to the National Register of Historic Places in 1997.

== History and architectural features ==
Built circa 1817, this historic structure is a one-story, square, sandstone building. It measures twenty-five feet square and has a gable roof. A two-story, rear stone addition was added circa 1935.

This structure was built as a bank and was in use as such until 1819. Afterwards, it was used as a school, Methodist church, store, post office, pool room, fruit stand, restaurant, and medical office. It now houses a museum that is operated by the Perryopolis Area Heritage Society.
