= Karolcik Building =

- U.S. National Register of Historic Places
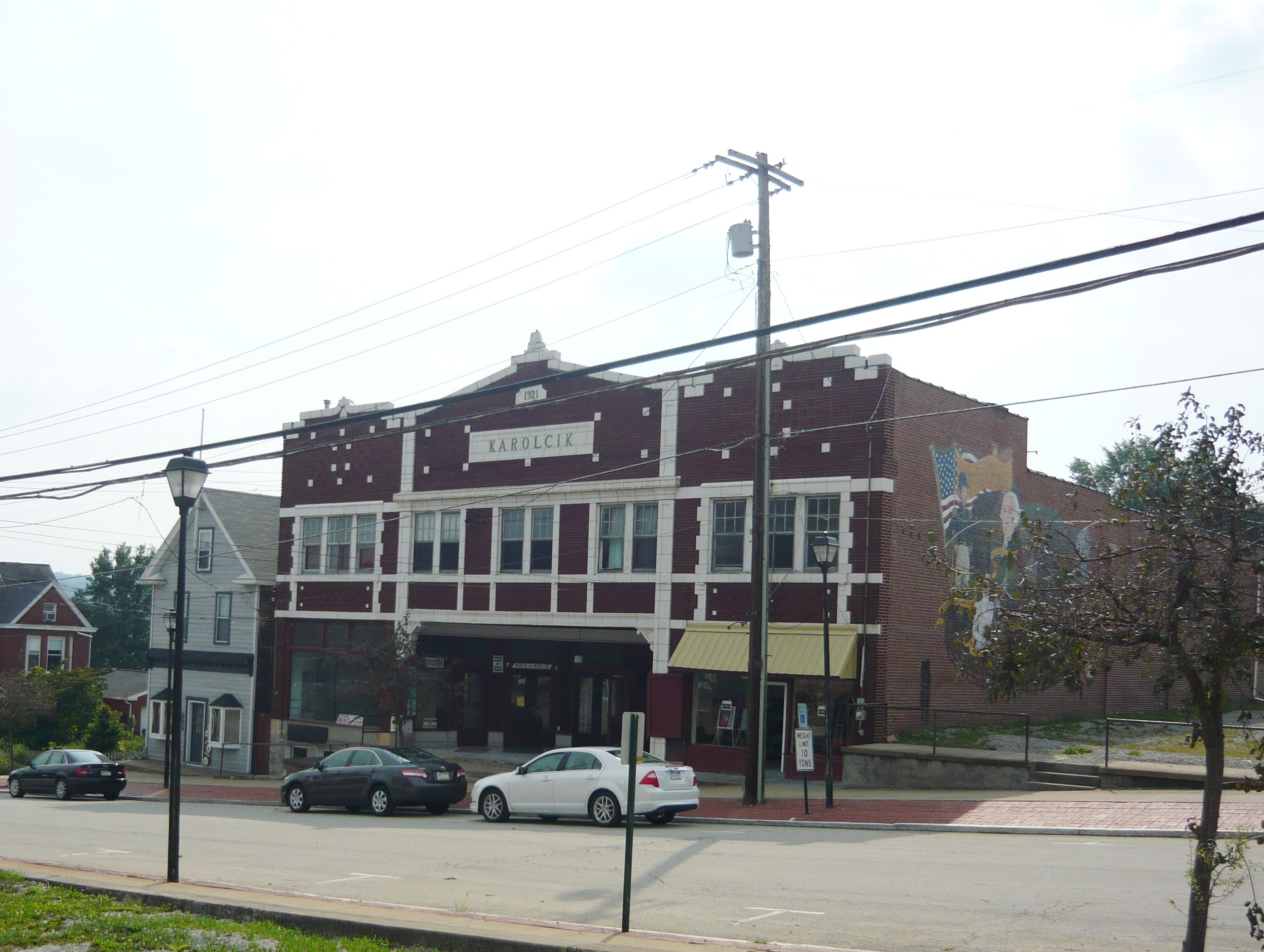
- Karolcik Building, August 2011

- Location within Pennsylvania Location within the United States
- Location: 115-117 S. Liberty St., Perryopolis, Pennsylvania
- Coordinates: 40°5′12″N 79°45′5″W
- Area: less than one acre
- Built: 1921
- Architectural style: Bungalow/craftsman
- NRHP reference No.: 97001246
- Added to NRHP: October 24, 1997

The Karolcik Building, also known as the Perry Theater, is an historic commercial and theater building that is located in Perryopolis, Fayette County, Pennsylvania, United States.

It was added to the National Register of Historic Places in 1997.

== History and architectural features ==
Built in 1921, this historic structure is a two-story, rectangular, brick and terra cotta building. Its design was influenced by the bungalow and American Craftsman movement. The building has housed a variety of commercial and entertainment activities including a theater, bowling alley and poolroom, and meeting room. The second floor also housed an apartment.
