= Searight's Fulling Mill =

- U.S. National Register of Historic Places
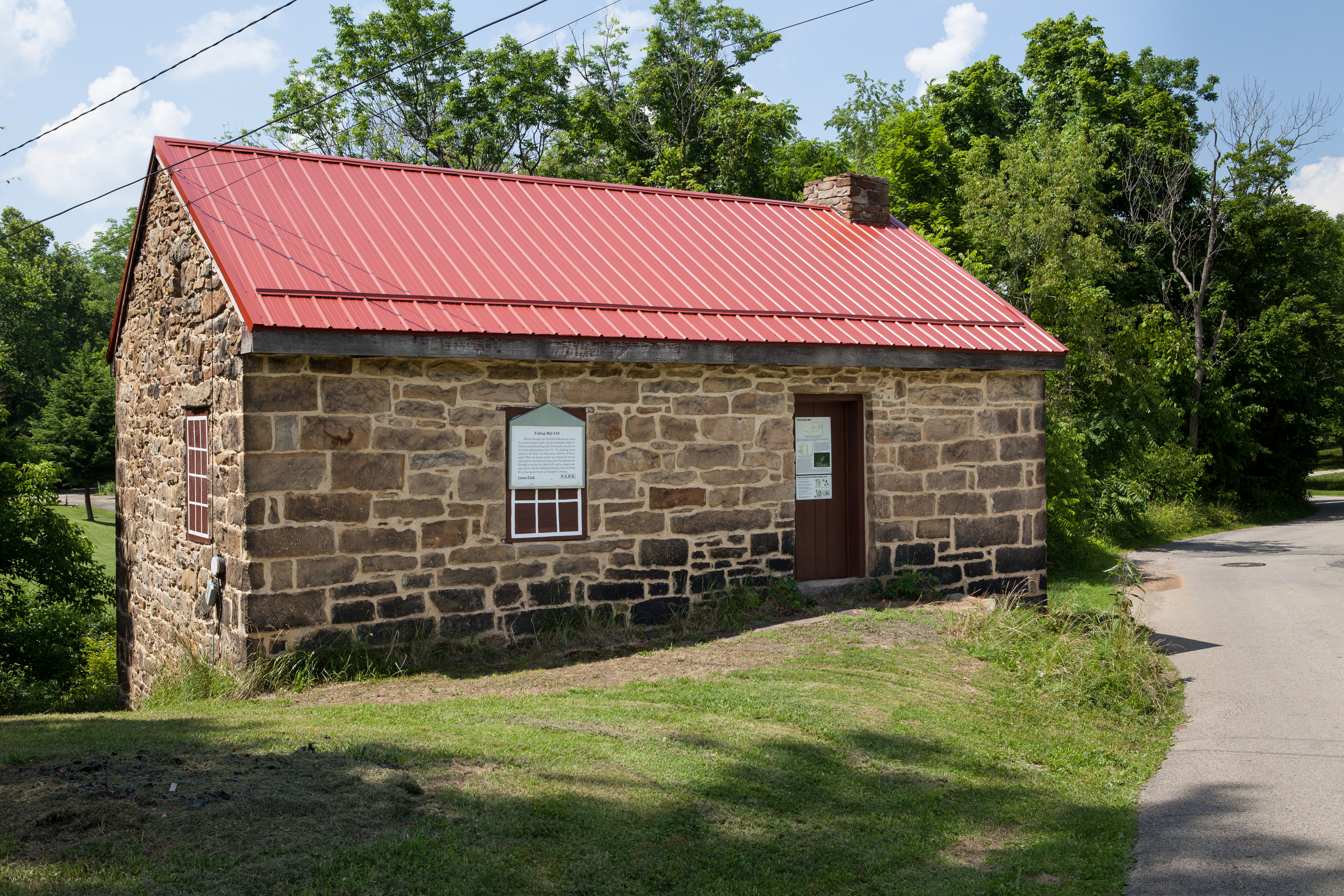
- The mill, seen from Strawn Rd, June 2014

- Location within Pennsylvania Location within the United States
- Location: Cemetery Rd., Perryopolis, Pennsylvania
- Coordinates: 40°5′1″N 79°44′42″W
- Area: 8 acres (3.2 ha)
- Built: 1810
- NRHP reference No.: 73001631
- Added to NRHP: June 19, 1973

Searight's Fulling Mill is a historic fulling mill located at Perryopolis, Fayette County, Pennsylvania, USA. It was built about 1810 and is a 2 1/2-story, sandstone building with a gable roof. It measures approximately 20 by 30 feet (6.1 by 9.1 m). The mill closed in the 1820s and was converted to a dwelling.

It was added to the National Register of Historic Places in 1973.

The mill is named after William Searight, who built the mill on a farm previously owned by George Washington. Searight is credited for realizing that small fulling mills could not compete with city based factories served by railroads, and left the fulling business before his mills became unprofitable.
