= Goodbye Horses: The Many Lives of Q Lazzarus =

- Directed by: Eva Aridjis Fuentes
- Produced by: Howard Gertler; Kathy Rivkin Daum (co-producer)
- Starring: Q Lazzarus
- Cinematography: Eva Aridjis Fuentes; Nathan Corbin
- Edited by: Eva Aridjis Fuentes; Connor Kalista; Ioannis Papaloizou; Tyler H. Walk
- Music by: Q Lazzarus
- Production company: Dark Night Pictures
- Distributed by: Pimienta Films (Mexico)
- Release dates: October 24, 2024 (Morelia); March 7, 2025
- Running time: 103 minutes
- Language: English

Goodbye Horses: The Many Lives of Q Lazzarus is a 2024 documentary film directed by Eva Aridjis Fuentes. The documentary is about the life and music of American singer Diane Luckey, better known by her stage name Q Lazzarus, who is best known for her song "Goodbye Horses". The song received attention after it was featured in the 1988 film Married to the Mob and the 1991 film The Silence of the Lambs, but Q Lazzarus herself disappeared from the public eye in the mid-1990s. The film includes narration by and interviews with Q Lazzarus herself before her death in 2022.

The film had its World Premiere on October 19, 2024, at the Morelia International Film Festival in Mexico. It had its theatrical releases / qualifying runs in London, Los Angeles and New York City in March 2025.

== Background ==
Filmmaker Eva Aridjis met Diane Luckey, better known by her stage name Q Lazzarus, in August 2019 after getting picked up in her car service in New York City. Soon afterwards they began making a documentary about her life and music, with the final scenes in preparation at the time of her death in July 2022. Luckey gave Aridjis a "huge sack of cassette tapes" containing music she recorded in New York City and London during the 1980s and 1990s. A Kickstarter was launched for the film.

== Reception ==
The film won the Audience Award for Mexican Documentary Feature Film at the 22nd Morelia International Film Festival in 2024. British Newspaper The Guardian called the film "a moving and honest triumph".

The film has received glowing reviews from audience members and film critics alike. It was written about in The New York Times shortly before its limited release in theaters.

The film is currently streaming on the Criterion Channel.

== Soundtrack ==
Goodbye Horses: The Many Lives of Q Lazzarus (Music From The Motion Picture)

Soundtrack album by Q Lazzarus
- Released: February 21, 2025
- Recorded: 1985–1995
- Genre: Rock; new wave; synth-pop; dance; electronic; dark wave
- Length: 45:57 (vinyl edition); 1:45:25 (digital edition); 1:53:09 (CD edition)
- Label: Sacred Bones Records

Singles from Goodbye Horses: The Many Lives of Q Lazzarus
- 1. "Goodbye Horses (New Wave version)" Released: December 12, 2024; 2. "Heaven" Released: January 14, 2025; 3. "I See Your Eyes" Released: January 29, 2025

Goodbye Horses: The Many Lives of Q Lazzarus (Music from the Motion Picture) is a soundtrack album featuring songs from the 2025 documentary film of the same name. It was released by Sacred Bones Records on February 21, 2025, in the vinyl, double CD, digital download and streaming formats.

The album has been named by online magazine Consequence as one of its most anticipated albums of 2025.

=== Background ===
The soundtrack marked the first time that the majority of the songs had been officially released, though several songs were previously featured in films. The song "The Candle Goes Away" was used in the 1986 film Something Wild, though did not appear on the film's soundtrack. "Goodbye Horses" was used in the 1988 film Married to the Mob and was included on the soundtrack for the film. It was again used in the 1991 film The Silence of the Lambs and was released as a single the same year, becoming the only Q Lazzarus song to receive a single release during her lifetime. "Heaven" is a cover of a song by Talking Heads which Q Lazzarus performed in the 1993 film Philadelphia, though it did not appear on the film's soundtrack.

=== Reception ===
Professional ratings
Review scores
Source	Rating
Pitchfork	7.4/10
Uncut	8/10 stars

Uncut magazine gave a positive review of the album, noting the songs "[demonstrated] the brooding intensity Luckey brought to a range of styles" and highlighting the genres Electro-soul, House and Alternative rock present on the album.

The Quietus named the album "compilation of the week", and highlighted the "unpredictably eclectic mix of styles" including "pounding gothic rock and (what sounds like) Britpop/baggy-leaning indie", as well as "a fusion of old styles with new, and a soulful exploration of shadowier artistic impulses, which drag a 60s sensibility into the digital age."

Arielle Gordon of Pitchfork magazine gave the album a rating of 7.4 out of 10. She noted the "remarkably diverse [...] recordings", ranging "from spiraling psych rock to headbanging hair metal", which "showcase Q Lazzarus' range, rage, and strange, cosmic beauty". The expanded edition available via Streaming and CD was noted to contain further songs that were "all similarly striking in their heartbreaking mix of pop production, disquieting lyrics, and Q's indelible voice". The soundtrack as whole "[does] little to contain or classify the mysterious vocalist, instead offering expanded parallel universes that trace Luckey's journey from Pyramid Club crooner to glam-rock frontwoman and back again".

=== Track listing ===
Vinyl pressings include the first ten songs that appear on the CD edition. Digital and streaming editions include all songs on the CD edition except the single edit of "Goodbye Horses" and "The Candle Goes Away", with the New Wave version of "Goodbye Horses" moved to first place in the track list.

Goodbye Horses: The Many Lives of Q Lazzarus (Vinyl edition / CD edition – Disc 1)
No.	Title	Writer(s)	Length
1.	"Goodbye Horses" (Single Edit)	William Garvey	3:07
2.	"Heaven"	David Byrne; Jerry Harrison	4:33
3.	"I See Your Eyes"	Diane Luckey; Mark Barrett; Jon Bouillot; Rick Duce	5:26
4.	"A Fools Life"	Luckey; Barrett; Bouillot; Duce	4:13
5.	"Summertime"	DuBose Heyward; George Gershwin	4:20
6.	"My Mistake"	Luckey; Dan Agren	5:04
7.	"Hellfire"	Luckey	5:25
8.	"Don't Let Go"	Luckey; Barrett; Bouillot; Duce	4:53
9.	"Bang Bang"	Luckey; Barrett; Bouillot; Duce	3:52
10.	"Goodbye Horses" (New Wave version)	Garvey	5:04
Total length:			45:57

Goodbye Horses: The Many Lives of Q Lazzarus (CD edition – Disc 2)
No.	Title	Writer(s)	Length
1.	"Flesh for Sale"	Luckey; Barrett; Bouillot; Shane Atlas	4:23
2.	"I Don't Want to Love You Anymore"	Luckey; Barrett; Bouillot; Atlas	4:25
3.	"The Candle Goes Away"	Garvey	4:37
4.	"Fathers, Mothers, and Children Dying in the Street"	Luckey; Barrett; Bouillot; Atlas; Agren	5:19
5.	"Love Lust"	Luckey; Agren	5:14
6.	"Home"	Luckey; Agren	4:51
7.	"Momma Never Said"	Luckey; Barrett; Bouillot; Atlas	4:32
8.	"The Time is Right (Dare)"	Agren	4:46
9.	"Only You Can Light the Candle"	Agren	5:17
10.	"Love Dance"	Luckey	5:54
11.	"Take the Time"	Luckey; Barrett; Bouillot; Atlas	4:55
12.	"Be Mine"	Luckey; Barrett; Bouillot; Atlas	4:38
13.	"It Don't Mean Nothing"	Luckey; Barrett; Bouillot; Duce	4:21
Total length:			1:07:12

=== Charts ===
Chart (2025)	Peak position
UK Independent Album Breakers Chart (OCC)	18
