= Heaven (Talking Heads song) =

Song by Talking Heads

Song by Talking Heads

from the album Fear of Music
- Released: August 3, 1979
- Genre: Pop/Rock
- Length: 4:01
- Label: Sire
- Songwriters: David Byrne; Jerry Harrison (Note: The original LP issue credited the song solely to Byrne; later CD issues credit both Byrne and Harrison.)
- Producers: Brian Eno; Talking Heads

Official audio
- "Heaven" on YouTube

"Heaven" is a song by the American rock band Talking Heads, released on their third studio album Fear of Music (1979). The lyrics refer to heaven as "a place where nothing ever happens", where a party and a kiss repeat exactly the same way endlessly (though David Byrne has claimed the song was inspired by a UK bar of the same name).

The song has been called "the calm after [the band's] unusual ominous storm" by Bill Janovitz of AllMusic and something "psychologists would certainly have a field day with" by author and The Guardian journalist Ian Gittins. Dave Bell, writing for quarterly UK magazine Ceasefire, argued that the song "epitomises pop as Samuel Beckett might write it: tedious, beautiful and desperate".

The song was performed live in their 1984 concert film Stop Making Sense, and a live recording from 1979 was included on the 2004 CD reissue of the band's 1982 live album The Name of This Band Is Talking Heads.

== Cover versions ==
In 1995, the song was covered by Australian singer Iva Davies and his band Icehouse on The Berlin Tapes, the soundtrack album accompanying the ballet Berlin, for which Icehouse performed live on stage.

In 1996, the song was covered by American jazz vocalist Jimmy Scott on his album of the same name and the My Sister's Keeper Soundtrack.

The song was covered by English singer Eric Burdon on his 2004 album My Secret Life and in 1985 by English band Simply Red for their debut studio album Picture Book.

A German-language cover of the song, "Der Weg in die Ferne", was recorded by Joachim Witt for his debut studio album Silberblick (1980).

In 1986, Thomas Di Leva made a Swedish-language adaptation of the song, named "Himlen". It was recorded for his album Pussel, and was also the B-side of his single "Snurra bakåt!"

Singer Q Lazzarus covered "Heaven" for the 1993 film Philadelphia (directed by Jonathan Demme, who had filmed Stop Making Sense). Her version was not available in its complete form until the release of the soundtrack from the documentary Goodbye Horses: The Many Lives of Q Lazzarus in 2025.

k.d. lang covered "Heaven" for her thirteenth studio album Sing It Loud (2011).

The National contributed a cover of "Heaven" to the 2024 Talking Heads tribute album Everyone's Getting Involved: A Tribute to Talking Heads' Stop Making Sense.
