= St. Nicholas Byzantine Catholic Church =

Historic church in Pennsylvania, United States

- U.S. National Register of Historic Places
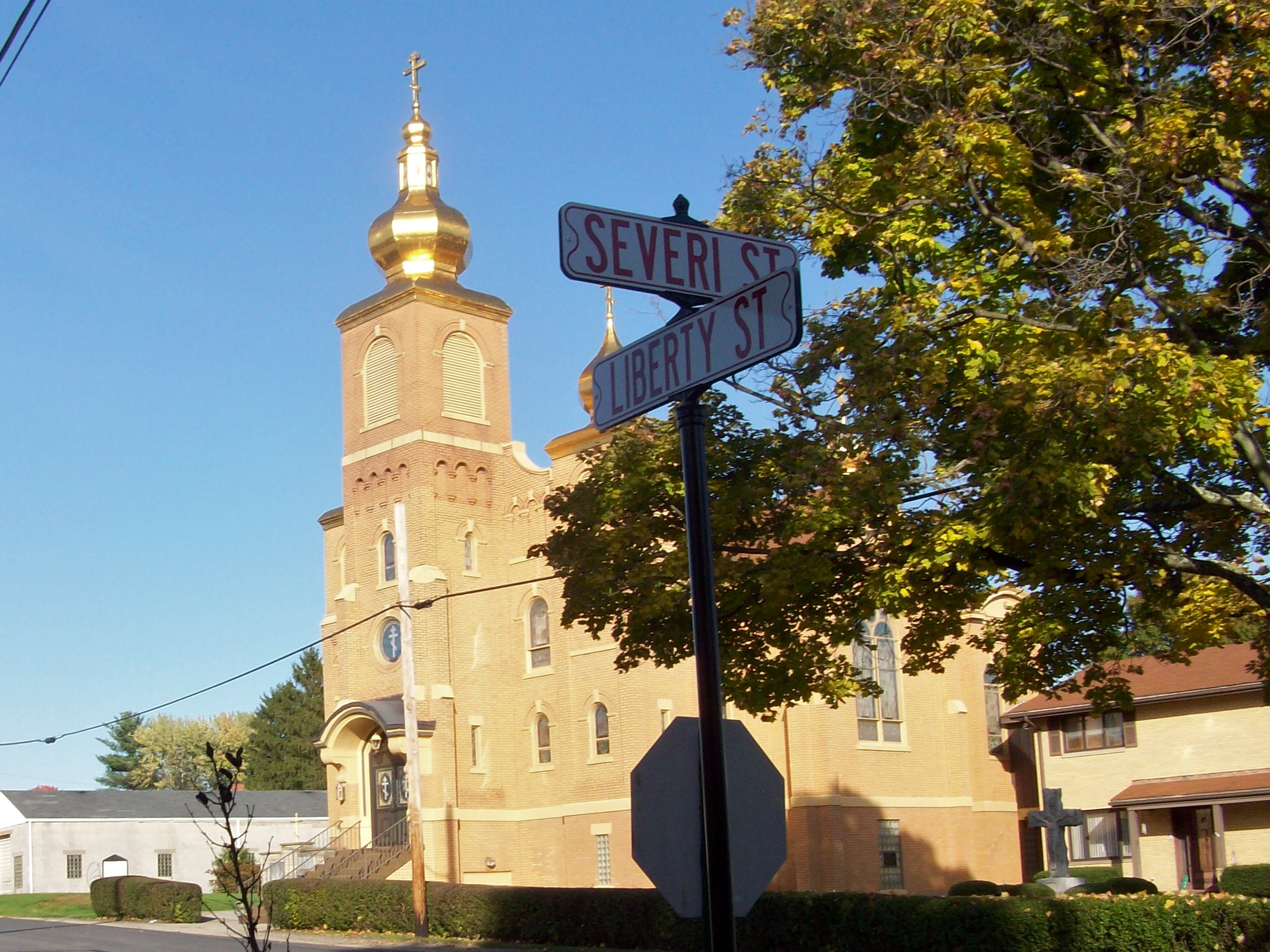

- Location within Pennsylvania Location within the United States
- Location: 504 S. Liberty St., Perryopolis, Pennsylvania
- Coordinates: 40°4′55″N 79°45′8″W
- Area: less than one acre
- Built: 1912-1918
- Architectural style: Byzantine Revival
- NRHP reference No.: 97001247
- Added to NRHP: November 7, 1997

St. Nicholas Byzantine Catholic Church, also known as St. Nicholas Greek Catholic Church, is a historic Catholic Church church at 504 S. Liberty Street in Perryopolis, Fayette County, Pennsylvania. It was built between 1912 and 1918, and is a 30 feet by 60 feet yellow brick building in the Byzantine Revival style. It has a cruciform plan and the gabled roof is topped by four onion domes. The church served a community of Rusyns who originally settled in the area prior to 1907.

It was added to the National Register of Historic Places in 1997.

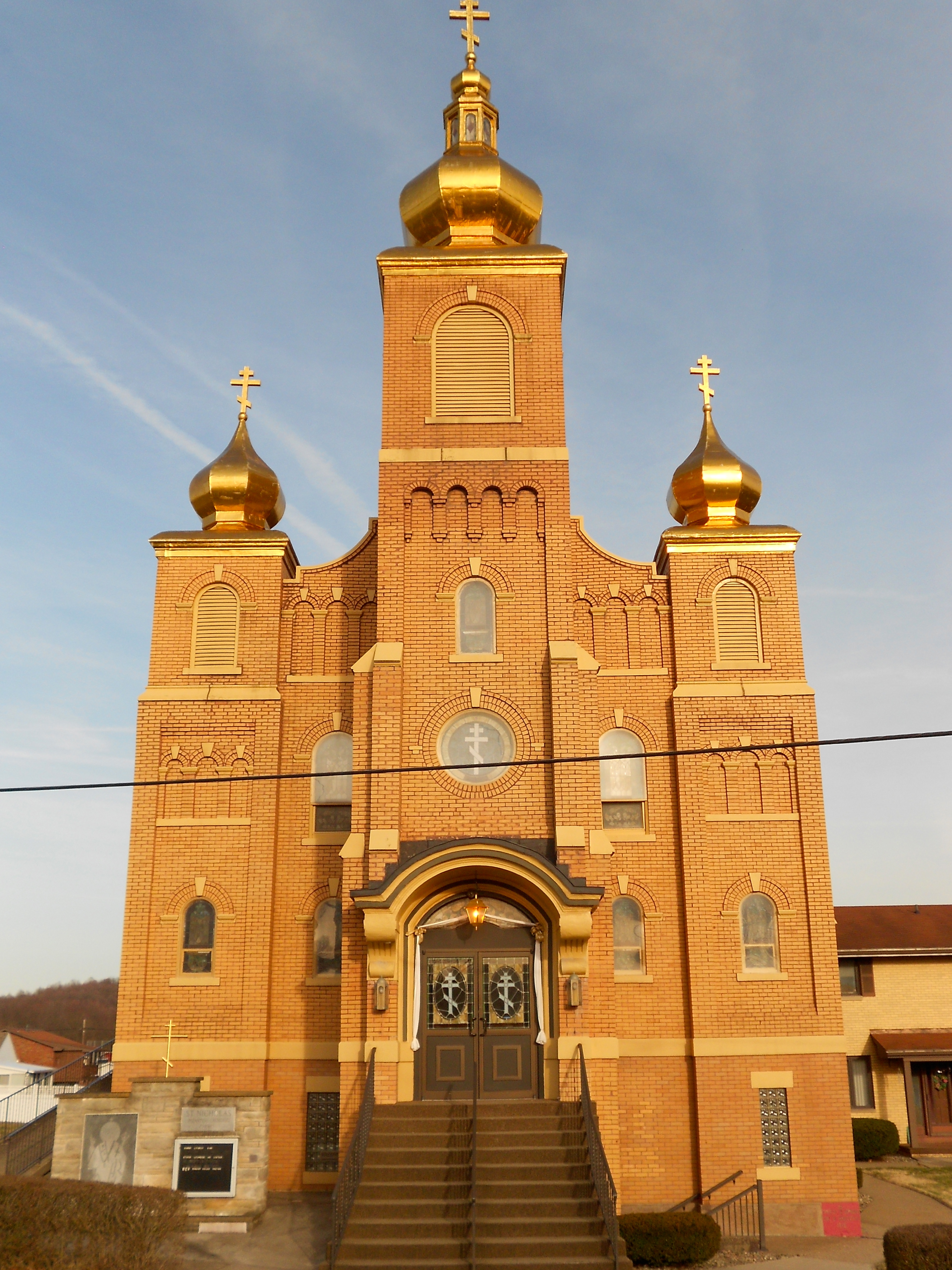
Front of the church
