= Chloe Aridjis =

Mexican-American novelist and writer (born 1971)

Chloe Aridjis FRSL
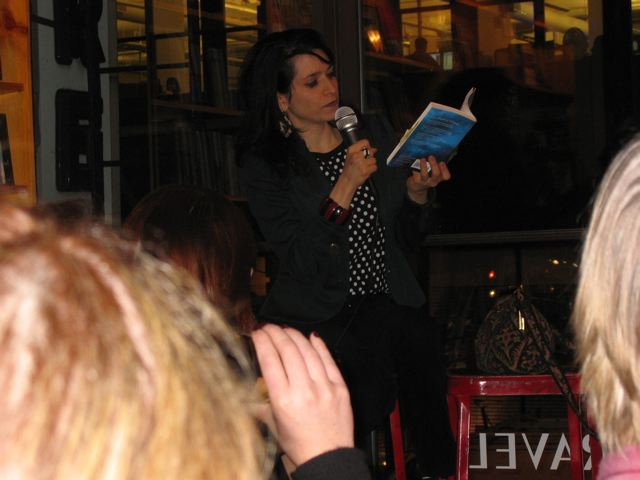
- Aridjis reading from Book of Clouds
- Born: New York City, U.S.
- Education: Harvard University (BA); University of Oxford (PhD)
- Occupation: Novelist
- Relatives: Homero Aridjis (father); Eva Aridjis (sister)
- Writing career
- Language: English
- Period: Contemporary
- Genres: Literary fiction; Magical realism
- Notable works: Book of Clouds (2009); Asunder (2013); Sea Monsters (2019); Dialogue With a Somnambulist (2021, 2023)
- Notable awards: Prix du Premier Roman Étranger (2009); PEN/Faulkner Award for Fiction (2020); Prado Museum Writing the Prado Residency (2023)
- Website: penguin.co.uk/authors/222196/chloe-aridjis

Chloe Aridjis FRSL (born 1971) is a Mexican and American novelist and writer. Her novel Book of Clouds (2009) was published in eight countries, and won the Prix du Premier Roman Étranger. Her second novel, Asunder was published in 2013 to unanimous acclaim.

Her third novel, Sea Monsters (2019), was awarded the PEN/Faulkner Award for Fiction in 2020. Her fourth novel, The Shadow of the Object, was published in April 2026 and longlisted for the Booker Prize 2026 in July 2026.

== Early life and background ==
Born in New York City, Chloe Aridjis grew up in Mexico City and the Netherlands, where her father served as Mexico's ambassador. Aridjis studied comparative literature at Harvard University and wrote a thesis on "Night and the Poetic Self" in Charles Baudelaire's Les Fleurs du mal at the University of Oxford, under the supervision of Malcolm Bowie before completing a doctorate on "the interface between high and popular art in nineteenth-century France with a special focus on the relationship between poetry, magic shows and literature of the fantastic". As a teenager, she had a bilingual exposure to pop in Mexico City, listening to British bands while discovering their Mexican equivalents at a gay goth club.

She is the eldest daughter of Mexican poet and diplomat Homero Aridjis and American Betty F. de Aridjis, an environmental activist and translator. She is the sister of film maker Eva Aridjis.

She met great poets such as Jorge Luis Borges and Ted Hughes at international poetry festivals her parents organised in the early 1980s. This had a lasting effect on Aridjis, who maintained a correspondence with several of them throughout her adolescence. Her favourite authors include Nikolai Gogol, Samuel Beckett, Thomas Bernhard, Franz Kafka, Miguel de Cervantes, Edgar Allan Poe, Horacio Quiroga, Charles Baudelaire, Gérard de Nerval, Stéphane Mallarmé, Arthur Rimbaud, Ann Quin, Walter Benjamin, Virginia Woolf, Clarice Lispector, Robert Walser, Gaston Bachelard, Comte de Lautréamont and René Daumal.

== Career ==
Her book of essays on Magic and the Literary Fantastique in Nineteenth-Century France was published in 2002. Her doctoral thesis was published in Spanish as Topografía de lo insólito: La magia y lo fantástico literario en la Francia del siglo XIX (Fondo de Cultura Económica, Mexico, 2005). She publishes in journals and newspapers in England and Mexico, among them essays for Granta on insomnia and the psychological fallout of space travel on Soviet cosmonauts. Aridjis lived in Berlin for five years, and currently resides in London. She has been vegetarian since 1986.

Her debut novel, Book of Clouds, was published in the US by Grove Press in winter 2009, and by Chatto and Windus in the UK in July 2009, in the Netherlands, and by Mercure de France in September 2009. It was published in Mexico, Spain, Romania and Croatia in 2011 and as a graphic novel in French in early 2012. In his review of Book of Clouds for The Independent, Daniel Hahn described it as an "exceptional debut novel". In The New York Times, Wendy Lesser described it as "a stunningly accurate portrait of Berlin". Regina Marler in the Los Angeles Times drew attention to Aridjis's "magic and poetry", and described "an unsettling atmosphere unlike anything in recent fiction." In November 2009, Book of Clouds won the Prix du Premier Roman Étranger in France.

Her second novel, Asunder, was published in May 2013 by Chatto and Windus in London, and in September by Houghton Mifflin Harcourt in New York City. The novel concerns two museum guards, one at the National Gallery in London, for whom life and art begin to overtake each other in surreal and unsettling ways. It involves a trip to Paris, and carefully contained worlds torn apart. The Times Literary Supplement wrote of it: "Chloe Aridjis is crafting a poetics of the strange ... This is deft and shimmering fiction"; The Guardian described the novel as "Strange, extravagant, darkly absorbing ... thrills with energy."

Her third novel, Sea Monsters, was published in February 2019. The New Yorker referred to it as "a hypnotic narrative of disenchantment", while The Atlantic called it "a strange symbolist novel that would make Mallarmé proud" and wrote: "Like a magician, Aridjis is obsessed with elusiveness; like a symbolist, she far prefers imagination and metaphor to plain sight." Sea Monsters won the PEN/Faulkner Award for Fiction in 2020.

Aridjis was awarded a Guggenheim Fellowship in 2014. In 2020, she was awarded the Eccles Centre & Hay Festival Writers Award for her forthcoming novel entitled Reports from the Land of the Bats. In the same year, she was elected a Fellow of the Royal Society of Literature.

She was co-curator of the Leonora Carrington exhibition at Tate Liverpool that opened in March 2015 and she occasionally writes for frieze and other art journals. In 2018 she starred in Josh Appignanesi's arthouse film "Female Human Animal."

In February 2016, her English translation of her father's book The Child Poet was published.

Aridjis is a member of Writers Rebel, a group of writers that focuses on the climate emergency. She is particularly interested in issues involving species extinction, and animal welfare in general.

== Personal life ==
Aridjis lives in London.

== Works ==
- Magic and the Literary Fantastique in Nineteenth-Century France. University of Oxford, 2002.
- Topografía de lo insólito. Fondo de Cultura Económica, Mexico City, 2005.
- Book of Clouds. London: Chatto and Windus, 2009.
- Asunder. Houghton Mifflin Harcourt. 2013. ISBN 978-0-544-00351-4.
- Book of Clouds. Grove/Atlantic, Incorporated. 2009. ISBN 978-1-55584-919-1.
- Sea Monsters. Chatto & Windus, 2019.
- Dialogue with a Somnambulist: Stories, Essays & a Portrait Gallery. House Sparrow Press, 2021. ISBN 978-1-913513-29-0.
- The Shadow of the Object. Vintage Publishing. 2026. ISBN 9781529969931.
