= Eva Aridjis =

Mexican and American filmmaker

Eva Aridjis Fuentes is a Mexican and American filmmaker. She attended the American School Foundation in Mexico City, Princeton University, and New York University. She has made many prize-winning short and feature-length films.

== Early life and education ==
Born in the Netherlands, raised in Mexico City, and now living in New York City, Aridjis Fuentes is the daughter of Mexican poet and novelist, Homero Aridjis, and American environmental activist and translator, Betty Ferber. Her sister is writer Chloe Aridjis.

Aridjis Fuentes left Mexico City when she was 18 to study Anthropology and Comparative Literature at Princeton University, where she wrote her thesis on the concepts of the self and other in the works of Borges, Cortázar, Baudelaire and Lacan. She also took all of the film classes on offer, and worked as Professor P. Adams Sitney's assistant for three years. She then earned an MFA in Film and Television at New York University, where she focused on directing and writing.

== Career ==
=== Films ===
While at NYU Eva made several short films, including Taxidermy: The Art of Imitating Life and Billy Twist, both of which played at the Sundance Film Festival and dozens of other festivals around the world.

An activist for many of Mexico City's street children, in 2003 she made the film Niños de la Calle (Children of the Street), to bring attention to the fast-growing phenomenon. The documentary was nominated for two Mexican Academy Awards (Premio Ariel), and won the Best Feature Documentary prize at the Morelia International Film Festival in 2003. Since making this movie in 2001, Aridjis has stayed in contact with the protagonists.

In 2004, she wrote and directed her first narrative feature film, The Favor (2006), starring Frank Wood and Ryan Donowho. The film, which is also her first English-language feature film, premiered at the CineVegas Film Festival in June 2006, where it won a prize. Ryan Donowho also won the "Best Actor" prize at the San Diego Film Festival for his performance in the film. The Favor was released theatrically in Mexico in 2007 and in the United States in 2008, and aired on the Sundance Channel. Justin Chang at Variety wrote that "Eva Aridjis invests her first fiction feature with rewarding depths of humor and feeling" and "Both thesps succeed in establishing the kind of effortless rapport that eludes their characters. Their final dialogue exchanges are written and directed by Aridjis with particular sensitivity".

Aridjis' second feature documentary, about a Mexican religious cult, entitled La Santa Muerte (Saint Death), is narrated by Gael García Bernal. La Santa Muerte premiered at the Los Angeles Film Festival in 2007 and has screened at festivals all over the US, Latin America, and Europe, winning the best documentary award at the Trieste Film Festival in Italy.

Aridjis' second narrative feature, Los Ojos Azules (The Blue Eyes), was shot entirely on location in Chiapas, Mexico and tells the story of a young American couple (played by Allison Case and Zachary Booth) who travel there and have an encounter with a shape-shifting witch (played by Ofelia Medina). The film premiered at the Morelia Film Festival and features an original score by J.G. Thirlwell.

Her fifth feature-length film, the documentary Chuy, El hombre lobo (Chuy, The Wolf Man) is about a Mexican family with congenital hypertrichosis. It screened in movie theaters all over Mexico in 2015 and received glowing reviews.

Since 2019, Aridjis Fuentes has been working on the documentary Goodbye Horses: The Many Lives of Q Lazzarus, about Diane Luckey, the singer-songwriter also known as Q Lazzarus who sang the cult hit song "Goodbye Horses" and had a brief moment of fame in the late 1980s and early 1990s before mysteriously disappearing for 25 years. The film premiered at the Morelia International Film Festival in October 2024 and won the Best Documentary Audience Award out of 14 films in competition. It had its theatrical release in the US and UK on March 7, 2025, and in Mexico on May 1, 2025. The soundtrack was released by Sacred Bones Records.

=== TV/Episodic ===
In 2018, Aridjis staffed on season one of the episodic series El Candidato and season two of Narcos: Mexico, co-writing episode 502 with show runner Eric Newman. She is currently developing two scripted series of her own, as well as a documentary mini-series.

=== Music video ===
Aridjis directed the music video for New York band The Walkmen's hit "The Rat" and Blacklist's "Language of the Living Dead".

=== Teaching ===
Aridjis taught Screenwriting in the Graduate Film department at New York University.

=== Books ===
Aridjis wrote the introduction to Angus Fraser's 2015 book of photographs titled Santa Muerte, and the essay "Death in Ancient and Present-Day Mexico" for Joanna Ebenstein's book Death: A Graveside Companion, published by Thames and Hudson in 2017. In addition, she wrote the novella Monarca (with Leopoldo Gout), which was published by HarperCollins in April 2022. She also wrote Animalia, which was published by (Screen) Play Press in July 2022.

== Reception ==
Tony Award winner Frank Wood describes Aridjis as "one of those extremely intelligent but-not-dependent-on-irony people."
