= Homero Aridjis =

Mexican writer, activist, journalist, and ambassador (born 1940)

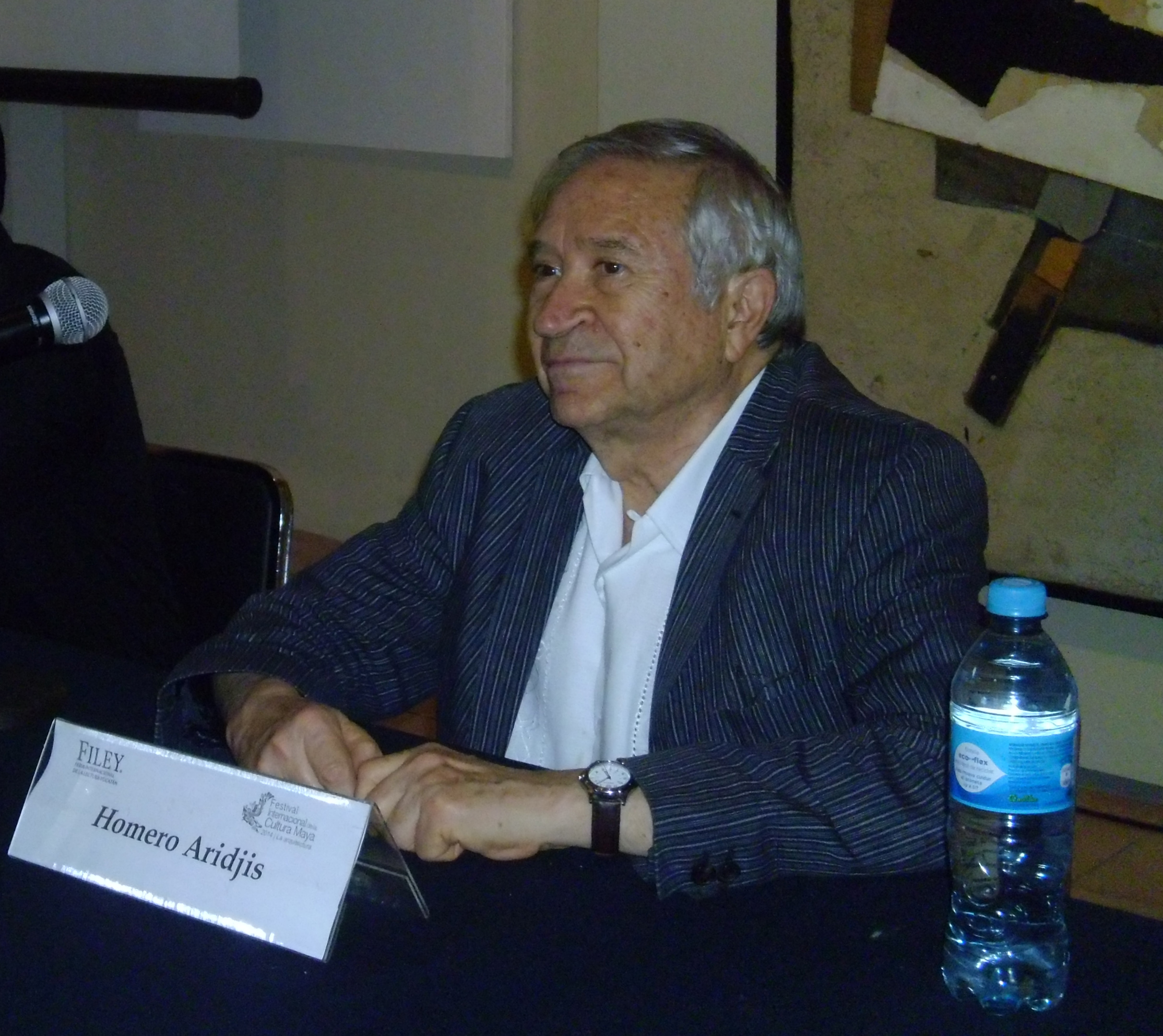
- Born: Homero Aridjis Fuentes; April 6, 1940 (age 86); Contepec, Michoacán, Mexico
- Spouse: Betty Ferber (m. 1965)
- Children: Chloe Aridjis (b. 1971); Eva Aridjis (b. 1974)
- Writing career
- Genres: Poetry; novels; short story; drama; essays

President of PEN International
- In office October 1997 – October 2003
- Preceded by: Ronald Harwood
- Succeeded by: Jiří Gruša

Homero Aridjis (born April 6, 1940) is a Mexican poet, novelist, environmental activist, journalist, and former ambassador and ex-president of PEN International.

== Family and early life ==
Aridjis was born in Contepec, Michoacán, Mexico, on April 6, 1940, to a Greek father and a Mexican mother; he was the youngest of five brothers. His father fought in the Greek army during World War I and the Greco-Turkish War, when his family was forced to flee from their home in Tire, southeast of Smyrna, in Asia Minor. His mother grew up in Contepec amidst the turmoil of the Mexican Revolution. After nearly losing his life at age ten in a shotgun accident, Aridjis became an avid reader and began to write poetry. In 1959 he was awarded a scholarship at the Rockefeller Foundation-supported Mexico City Writing Center (Centro Mexicano de Escritores), the youngest writer to have received the award in the center's 55-year history.

Aridjis has published 51 books of poetry and prose, many of them translated into a dozen languages. His achievements include: the Xavier Villaurrutia Award for best book of the year for Mirándola dormir, in 1964, the youngest writer to receive the prize; the Diana-Novedades Literary Prize for the outstanding novel in Spanish, for Memorias del nuevo mundo, in 1988; and the Grinzane Cavour Prize, for best foreign fiction, in 1992, for the Italian translation of 1492, Vida y tiempos de Juan Cabezón de Castilla. 1492: The Life and Times of Juan Cabezón of Castile was a New York Times Notable Book of the Year. He received the Prix Roger Caillois in France for his poetry and prose and Serbia's highest literary honor, the Smederevo Golden Key Prize, for his poetry. In 2005 the state of Michoacán awarded him the first Erendira State Prize for the Arts. Recently he received three poetry prizes in Italy: the Premio Internazionale di Poesia 2013, Premio Letterario Camaiore and the Premio Internazionale di Poesía Elena Violani Landi, Centro di Poesia Contemporanea, University of Bologna (2016);Premio Letterario Internazionale L'Aquila (2019). In 2024 he won the Griffin Poetry Prize in Canada for Self-Portrait in the Zone of Silence.

Twice the recipient of a John Simon Guggenheim Memorial Fellowship, Aridjis was named Doctor Honoris Causa by Indiana University.

He has been a visiting professor at Indiana University, New York University and Columbia University, and held the Nichols Chair in Humanities and the Public Sphere at the University of California, Irvine. He has been an editorial page columnist at the Mexican newspapers La Jornada, Reforma and El Universal since 1985, publishing hundreds of articles about environmental, political and literary topics.

Homero Aridjis has served as Mexico's ambassador to the Netherlands and Switzerland and to UNESCO in Paris. For six years between 1997 and 2003 he was President of PEN International, the worldwide association of writers.

== Personal life ==
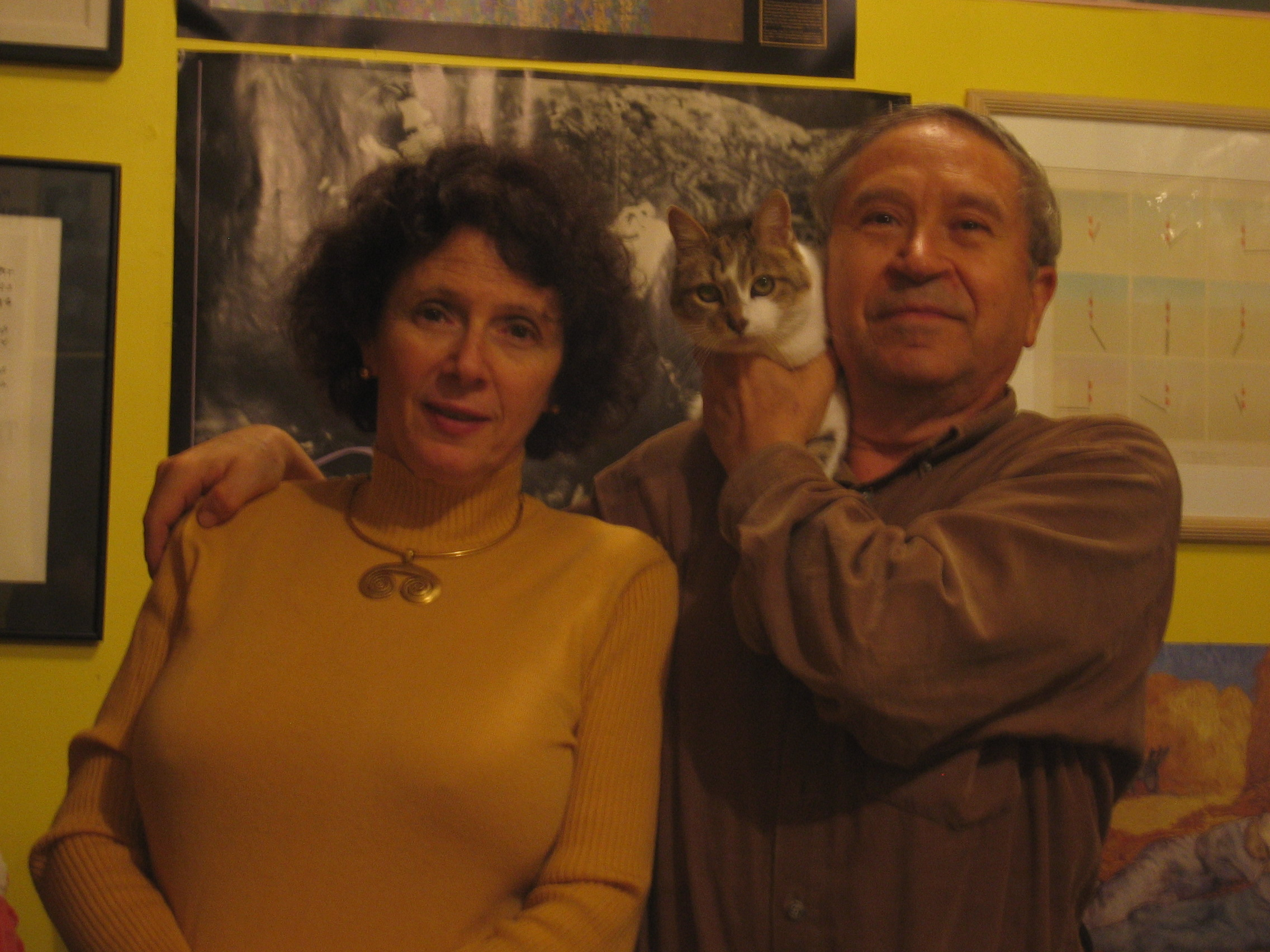
Homer and Betty Aridjis, in 2004

In 1965, Aridjis married Betty Ferber. They have two daughters, Eva Aridjis, a filmmaker in New York City (Niños de la calle, La Santa Muerte, The Favor, The Blue Eyes, Chuy, el hombre lobo, Goodbye Horses: The Many Lives of Q Lazzarus) and writer Chloe Aridjis, in London (The Shadow of the Object, Asunder, Book of Clouds, Sea Monsters, Topografía de lo insólito, Dialogue with a Somnambulist: Stories, Essays & A Critical Portrait).

== Environmental activism ==
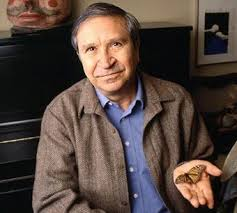
Homero Aridjis with a Monarch butterfly, in 2005

Aridjis is increasingly renowned as one of Latin America's leading environmental activists. As a child, he would often walk up a hillside behind his village to watch the migrating monarch butterflies. As he grew older logging thinned the forest and his concern for the fate of the butterflies and the trees triggered his earliest public defense of the environment.

In March 1985, Aridjis founded and became president of the Group of 100, an association of prominent artists and intellectuals, including Octavio Paz, Juan Rulfo, Rufino Tamayo, Gabriel García Márquez, Álvaro Mutis, Augusto Monterroso, Francisco Toledo, Leonora Carrington, Mathias Goeritz, Manuel Álvarez Bravo, Elena Poniatowska and others, devoted to environmental protection and the defense of biodiversity in Mexico and Latin America. Under his leadership the Group of 100 achieved in 1986 the official decree ensuring protection for the forests where the migratory monarch butterfly overwinters and in 1990 a permanent ban on the capture and commercialization of all seven species of sea turtle in Mexico. The Group was able to thwart the building of dams on the Usumacinta River that would have flooded 500 square kilometers of the Lacandon forest and submerged important Mayan ruins. For five years Aridjis spearheaded the defense of San Ignacio Lagoon, the gray whale nursery in Baja California, successfully preventing Mitsubishi and the Mexican government from building the world's largest solar salt works at the lagoon. Thanks to Aridjis and the Group of 100 the government agreed to publish daily reports of air quality in Mexico City, leaded gasoline was phased out and lead content in pottery drastically reduced, construction of an airport extension which would have obliterated a bird and wildlife sanctuary in Lake Texcoco was halted, thousands of tons of powdered milk contaminated by fallout from Chernobyl were returned to Ireland before they could be distributed in Mexico and a program limiting the circulation of cars in Mexico City one day each week was put into practice by the city government.

In 1991, he conceived of, organized and presided over the first "Morelia Symposium: Approaching the Year 2000", an international gathering of more than 40 prominent writers, scientists, environmentalists and representatives of indigenous peoples, to discuss the state of the planet and to establish a network for international cooperation. Among the participants were J. M. G. Le Clézio, Sherwood Rowland, Petra Kelly, Gert Bastian, Peter Raven, Lester Brown, and Augusto Roa Bastos.

In 1992, he presented the Morelia Declaration, a statement on the environment signed by more than 1000 writers and scientists from 66 countries, at the Earth Summit in Rio de Janeiro, where he spoke at the Global Forum with the Dalai Lama, Petra Kelly, Tom Hayden, Ted Turner and Jane Fonda, among others.

In 1994, he organized and presided over the second "Morelia Symposium: Approaching the Year 2000". Among the participants were J. M. G. Le Clézio, Rita Dove, Kjell Espmark, Bärbel Bohley, Bei Dao, W. S. Merwin, John Ralston Saul, Bill McKibben and Breyten Breytenbach. The Second Morelia Declaration was presented at the United Nations International Conference on Population and Development in Cairo in 1994. Aridjis obtained funding for both meetings from the Rockefeller Foundation.

In 2000, he organized and presided over "The Earth in the Year 2000", a joint International PEN—UNESCO symposium of writers and scientists in alliance for sustainable development.

As a pioneer of Mexican civil society, Aridjis played a crucial role in raising environmental awareness and promoting public participation for solving environmental problems, as well as defending freedom of expression about environmental matters.

== Public service ==
While still in his thirties Homero Aridjis served as Mexico's ambassador to the Netherlands and Switzerland. In 1980 he founded the Michoacán Institute of Culture, and as its Director General held an historic international poetry festival, established public libraries throughout the state, founded Mexico's first Museum of Mexican Masks, oversaw restoration of historical buildings, the recovery and restoration of colonial art, protection of cultural heritage, and promotion of cultural diversity in traditional celebrations throughout the state of Michoacán.

Besides the Morelia (Michoacan) Festival in 1981, Aridjis also organized and presided over two international poetry festivals in Mexico City, in 1982 and 1987, bringing to Mexico poets such as Jorge Luis Borges, Seamus Heaney, Günter Grass, Vasko Popa, Allen Ginsberg, Kazuko Shiraishi, Ted Hughes, Lawrence Ferlinghetti, Andrei Voznesensky, João Cabral de Melo Neto, Katerina Anghelaki-Rooke, Lars Forssell, Marin Sorescu, Tadeusz Różewicz, André du Bouchet, Eliseo Diego, Mazisi Kunene, Günter Kunert, Breyten Breytenbach, W. S. Merwin, Rita Dove and Paul Muldoon.

In 1997, a coalition of seventeen centers led by American, Japan, Swedish and Belgian (Dutch-speaking) PEN nominated Aridjis for International President of the worldwide association of writers, and he was elected President at the International PEN Congress in Edinburgh, winning a second three-year term at the Moscow Congress held in 2000. He is the first PEN President living in Latin America. During his presidency he oversaw a complete revision of PEN's constitution, achieved acceptance of Spanish as PEN's third official language and led the organization in bettering its governance and accountability. In 2003 he was elected International PEN President Emeritus.

From April 2007 until the abolition of the post in January 2010 he was Mexico's ambassador to UNESCO, where he was a staunch defender of human rights, freedom of expression and cultural diversity and an outspoken critic of lack of transparency and accountability in the UNESCO bureaucracy.

While Aridjis was Mexico's ambassador to UNESCO, he was the driving force behind UNESCO's decision to name Mexico's Monarch Butterfly Biosphere Reserve a UN World Heritage Site.

== Teaching activities ==
- Visiting professor, Indiana University, Bloomington, 1969.
- Visiting professor, New York University, 1969-1971.
- Visiting professor and writer-in-residence, Columbia University, 1979-1980.
- Nichols Chair in Humanities and the Public Sphere at the University of California, Irvine, 2002.
- Poetry workshop at the Social Security Institute in Mexico City from 1986-1988.
- Inaugural J.H. Tans Lecture, University of Limburg, Maastricht, The Netherlands, 1991.
- Cecil Green Distinguished Visiting Professor, University of British Columbia, Vancouver, Canada, 1993.
- Professor, "The Contemporary Novel" at Salzburg Seminar Session 354, Salzburg, Austria.
- Writer-in-Residence, The Sweet Briar Seminars 1999-2000 International Writers, Sweet Briar College, Sweet Briar, Virginia.
- Professor, Bennington Writing Seminar, Bennington College, Vermont, 2002.
- Rachel Carson Distinguished Lecture, Florida Gulf Coast University, Fort Myers, Florida, 2007.

== Awards and honors ==
As a writer:

- Fellowship from the Mexican Writers' Center (1959–60)
- Xavier Villaurrutia Award for best book of the year, for Mirándola dormir (1965)
- Chosen by Henry Kissinger to take part in the International Seminar for Politics and Humanities, Harvard University, 1966.
- John Simon Guggenheim Memorial Fellowship (1966–1967 and 1979–1980)
- French government fellowship (1966–1968)
- Guest of the Berliner Kunstlerprogramm of the Deutscher Akademischer Austauschdienst in West Berlin (1986 and 1988)
- Diana-Novedades Prize for Memorias del Nuevo Mundo, for the outstanding novel in Spanish (1988)
- Grinzane Cavour Prize for 1492, Vida y Tiempos de Juan Cabezón de Castilla, best foreign novel translated into Italian, 1992
- 1492: Life and Times of Juan Cabezón of Castile, New York Times Notable Book of the Year
- Honorary PhD in Humanities, Indiana University (1993)
- Residency at the Rockefeller Foundation's Bellagio Study and Conference Center, Bellagio, Italy. (1994 & 2010)
- Festival de Poesía Ramón López Velarde, Zacatecas, Mexico, held in his honor, 1995
- Prix Roger Caillois for the ensemble of his work as a poet and novelist, France (1997)
- Smederevo Golden Key for Poetry, Serbia (2002)
- First Erendira State Prize for the Arts, Michoacán, Mexico (2005)
- Premio Internazionale di Poesia 2013, Premio Letterario Camaiore, Italy
- Premio Internazionale di Poesía Elena Violani Landi, Centro di Poesia Contemporanea, University of Bologna (2016)
- Premio Letterario Internazionale L'Aquila Laudomia Bonanni, Italy (2019).
- Griffin Poetry Prize, Canada (2024)
- Emeritus Member, National System of Creative Artists, Mexico, since 1999
- Honorary member, Hellenic Authors Society

As an environmentalist:

- Global 500 Award from the United Nations Environment Program on behalf of the Group of 100
- Latin Trade magazine's Environmentalist of the Year
- José Maria Morelos Medal, the state of Michoacan's highest award
- John Hay Award from the Orion Society "for significant achievement in writing that addresses the relationship between people and nature", bestowed during a colloquium of writers and scientists in the Monarch Butterfly Biosphere Reserve in Mexico.
- Natural Resources Defense Council Force for Nature Award
- Green Cross Millennium Prize for International Environmental Leadership, given by Mikhail Gorbachev and Global Green (also awarded to his wife, Betty Ferber)
- Pax Natura Foundation Award

== Published works ==
=== English ===
- Blue Spaces/Los espacios azules, Selected Poems of Homero Aridjis, edited with an Introduction by Kenneth Rexroth, The Seabury Press, 1974
- Exaltation of Light, Boa Editions, 1981 (translated by Eliot Weinberger)
- Persephone, Aventura/Vintage Books, 1986 (translated by Betty Ferber)
- 1492: The Life and Times of Juan Cabezón of Castile, Summit Books, 1991 (translated by Betty Ferber)
- The Lord of the Last Days: Visions of the Year 1000, William Morrow, 1995 (translated by Betty Ferber)
- Eyes to See Otherwise/Ojos de otro mirar, selected and edited by Betty Ferber and George McWhirter, Carcanet, 2001, New Directions, 2002 (translated by Philip Lamantia, Kenneth Rexroth, W. S. Merwin, Jerome Rothenberg, George McWhirter, Lawrence Ferlinghetti, Eliot Weinberger)
- Solar Poems/Los poemas solares, City Lights Publishers, 2010, English and Spanish (translated by George McWhirter)
- Time of Angels/Tiempo de ángeles, City Lights Publishers, 2012 English and Spanish (translated by George McWhirter)
- An Angel Speaks, The Swedenborg Society, London, 2015.
- The Child Poet, Archipelago Books, New York, 2016 (translated by Chloe Aridjis).
- Maria the Monarch, Mandel Vilar Press, Simsbury, CT, 2017 (translated by Eva Aridjis).
- News of the Earth, Mandel Vilar Press, Simsbury, CT, 2017 (edited and translated by Betty Ferber).
- Contributor to A New Divan: Lyrical Dialogue Between East and West, Gingko Library 2019. ISBN 9781909942288
- Smyrna in Flames, Mandel Vilar Press, Simsbury, CT, and Dryad Press, Takoma Park, MD, 2021 (translated by Lorna Scott Fox)
- Self-Portrait in the Zone of Silence, New Directions, 2023 (translated by George McWhirter).
- Carne de Dios: A Novel, University of Arizona Press, 2026 (translated by Chloe Garcia Roberts)

=== Spanish ===
==== Poetry ====
- Los ojos desdoblados, Ed. La Palabra, Mexico, 1960.
- Antes del reino, Ed. Era, Mexico, 1963.
- Mirándola dormir, Ed. Joaquín Mortiz, Mexico, 1964.
- Perséfone, Ed. Joaquín Mortiz, 1967.
- Ajedrez-Navegaciones, Ed. Siglo XXI, Mexico, 1969.
- Los espacios azules, Ed. Joaquín Mortiz, Mexico, 1969.
- Quemar las naves, Ed. Joaquín Mortiz, Mexico, 1975.
- Vivir para ver, Ed. Joaquín Mortiz, Mexico, 1977.
- Construir la muerte, Ed. Joaquín Mortiz, Mexico, 1982.
- Imágenes para el fin del milenio & Nueva expulsión del paraíso, Ed. Joaquín Mortiz, Mexico, 1990.
- El poeta en peligro de extinción, Ediciones El Tucán de Virginia, Mexico, 1992.
- Tiempo de ángeles, Espejo de Obsidiana, Mexico, 1994. English translation, Time of Angels, City Lights Publishers, San Francisco, 2012.
- Ojos de otro mirar, Ediciones El Tucán de Virginia, Mexico, 1998.
- El ojo de la ballena, Fondo de Cultura Económica, Mexico, 2001.
- Los poemas solares, Fondo de Cultura Económica, Mexico, 2005. English translation, Solar Poems, City Lights Publishers, San Francisco, 2010.
- Diario de sueños, Fondo de Cultura Económica, Mexico, 2011.
- Del cielo y sus maravillas, de la tierra y sus miserias, Fondo de Cultura Económica, Mexico, 2013.
- Esmirna en llamas, Fondo de Cultura Económica, Mexico, DF, 2013
- La poesía llama, Fondo de Cultura Económica, Mexico, 2018.

==== Novels ====
- La tumba de Filidor, Ed. La Palabra, Mexico, 1961.
- El poeta niño, Fondo de Cultura Económica, Mexico, 1971.
- El encantador solitario, Fondo de Cultura Económica, Mexico, 1972.
- 1492 vida y tiempos de Juan Cabezón de Castilla, Ed. Siglo XXI, Mexico, 1985.
- Memorias del nuevo mundo, Editorial Diana, Mexico, 1988.
- La leyenda de los soles, Fondo de Cultura Económica, Mexico, 1993.
- El señor de los últimos días: Visiones del año mil, Alfaguara, Mexico, 1994.
- ¿En quién piensas cuando haces el amor?, Alfaguara, Mexico, 1996.
- La montaña de las mariposas, Alfaguara, Mexico, 2000.
- La zona del silencio, Alfaguara, Mexico, 2002.
- El hombre que amaba el sol, Alfaguara, Mexico, 2005.
- Sicarios, Alfaguara, Mexico, 2007.
- Los invisibles, Fondo de Cultura Económica, Mexico, 2010.
- Los perros del fin del mundo, Alfaguara, Mexico, 2012.
- Esmirna en llamas, Fondo de Cultura Económica, Mexico, 2013.
- Ciudad de zombis, Alfaguara, Mexico, 2014
- Carne de Dios, Alfaguara, Mexico, 2015.
- Los peones son el alma del juego, Alfaguara, Mexico, 2021.

==== Short fiction ====
- Noche de independencia, Ed. Ultramar, Salvat, Madrid, 1978.
- Playa nudista y otros relatos, Ed. Argos Vergara, Barcelona, 1982.
- La Santa Muerte, Alfaguara, Mexico, 2004.

==== Drama ====
- Espectáculo del año dos mil y Moctezuma, Ed. Joaquín Mortiz, México, 1981.
- El último Adán, Ed. Joaquín Mortiz, México, 1986.
- Gran teatro del fin del mundo, Joaquín Mortiz, México, 1989.

==== Non-fiction ====
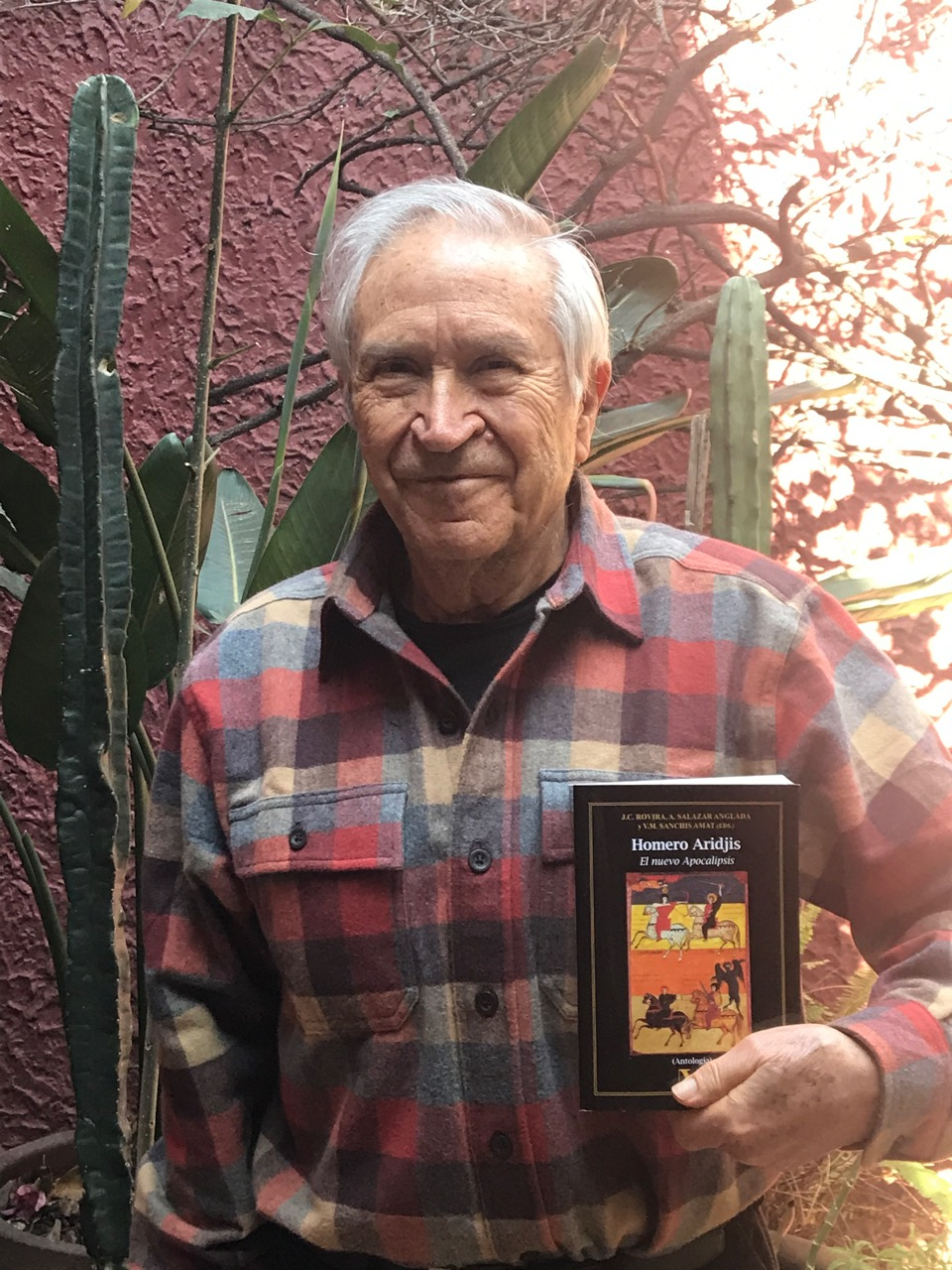
Homero Aridjis with Nuevo Apocalipsis, in 2020

- Apocalipsis con figuras, Taurus, Mexico, 1997.
- Noticias de la Tierra, with Betty Ferber, Random House Mondadori, Mexico, 2012.
- Testamento del dragón, Alfaguara Penguin Random House, Mexico, 2018.
- El nuevo Apocalipsis, Editorial Verbum, Madrid, 2020.

==== Children's books ====
- El silencio de Orlando, Alfaguara Infantil, Mexico, 2000, Ediciones Castillo, Mexico, 2015.
- El día de los perros locos, Alfguara Infantil, Mexico, 2003.
- El tesoro de la noche triste (Vuelven los perros locos), Alfaguara Infantil, Mexico, 2005.
- La búsqueda de Archelon: Odisea de las siete tortugas, Alfaguara, Mexico, 2006.
- María la monarca, Ediciones Castillo, Mexico, 2015.

==== Poetry anthologies ====
- Antología, Ed. Lumen, Barcelona, 1976.
- Antología poética, Ocnos Editores, Barcelona, 1976.
- Sobre una ausencia, Akal Editor, Madrid, 1977.
- Obra poética 1960-1986, Ed. Joaquín Mortiz, Mexico, 1987.
- Obra poética 1960-1990, Ed. Joaquín Mortiz, Mexico, 1991.
- Antologia poetica 1960-1994, Fondo de Cultura Económica, Mexico, 1994.
- Ojos de otro mirar: Poesía 1960-2001, Fondo de Cultura Económica, Mexico, 2002.
- Infancia de luz, Ediciones SM, Mexico, 2003.
- Antología poética, Fondo de Cultura Económica, Mexico, 2009.
- Antología poética, 1960-2018, Ediciones Cátedra, Madrid, 2018.

==== Critical anthologies ====
- Poesía en movimiento: México 1915-66, Ed. Siglo XXI, México, 1966, with Octavio Paz, Alí Chumacero and Jose Emilio Pacheco.
- 330 grabados originales de Manuel Manilla, Homero Aridjis y Arsacio Vanegas Arroyo, Editorial A. Vanegas Arroyo, Mexico, 1971.
- Seis poetas latinoamericanos de hoy, Harcourt, Brace, Jovanovich, New York, 1972.
- New Poetry of Mexico, E.H. Dutton, New York, 1972; Secker and Warburg, London, 1974.
- Heimwee naar de dood: Zeven Mexicaanse dichters van deze eeuw, Meulenhoff, Amsterdam, 1974.
- Savremena poezija Meksika, Bagdala, Belgrade, 1976.
- Snabbare an tanken ror sig bilden: Modern Mexikansk poesi, with Pierre Zekeli, Fibs Lyrikklubs, Stockholm, 1979.
- Antología del Primer Festival Internacional de Poesía, Morelia 1981, Ed. Joaquín Mortiz, Mexico 1982.
- Antología del Festival Internacional de Poesía de la Ciudad de México, El Tucán de Virginia, Mexico, 1988.
- Artistas e intelectuales sobre el Ecocidio Urbano, with Fernando Cesarman, Consejo de la Crónica de la Ciudad de México, Mexico, 1989.

==== Recordings ====
- Recording of his poetry for the Library of Congress, Washington, D.C., 1966.
- The World's Greatest Poets Reading at the Festival of Two Worlds, Spoleto, Italy, Spanish Poets, Volume I, Applause Productions, Inc., New York, 1968.
- Homero Aridjis: antología poética, Voz Viva de México, UNAM, Mexico, 1969.
- Poetry International 1973, Rotterdamse Kunststichting, Rotterdam, 1973.
- Homero Aridjis: Ojos de otro mirar, Entre voces, Fondo de Cultura Económica, Mexico, 2003.
- Recording of his poetry and prose for the Library of Congress, Washington, D.C., 2024.

Non-profit organization positions
Preceded by Ronald Harwood	International President of PEN International; 1997–2003	Succeeded by Jiří Gruša
