= Perryopolis, Pennsylvania =

Borough in Pennsylvania, US

- Borough
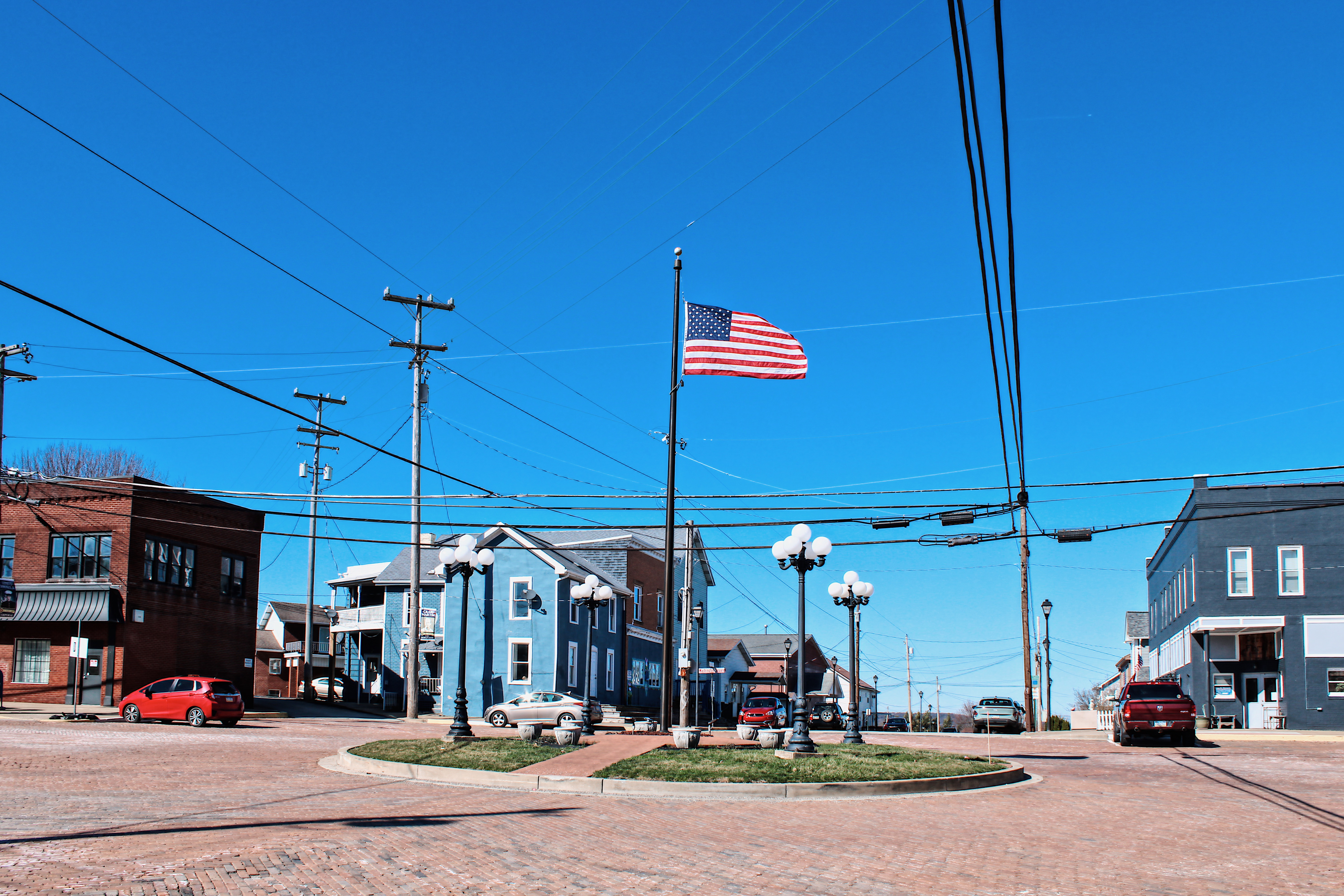
- Etymology: Oliver Hazard Perry
- Location of Perryopolis in Fayette County, Pennsylvania.

- Location in Pennsylvania Perryopolis (the United States)
- Coordinates: 40°5′9″N 79°45′8″W
- Country: United States
- State: Pennsylvania
- County: Fayette
- Established: 1814

Government
  - Mayor: Bud Petrosky

Area
  - Total: 1.47 sq mi (3.80 km^{2})
  - Land: 1.47 sq mi (3.80 km^{2})
  - Water: 0 sq mi (0.00 km^{2})
- Elevation: 1,010 ft (310 m)

Population (2020)
  - Total: 1,705
  - Density: 1,163.4/sq mi (449.21/km^{2})
- Time zone: UTC-4 (EST)
  - Summer (DST): UTC-5 (EDT)
- ZIP Code: 15473
- Area code: 724
- FIPS code: 42-59520
- Website: https://www.perryopolisborough.org/

Perryopolis is a borough in Fayette County, Pennsylvania, United States. The borough is part of the Pittsburgh metropolitan area. The population was 1,705 at the 2020 census.

== History ==
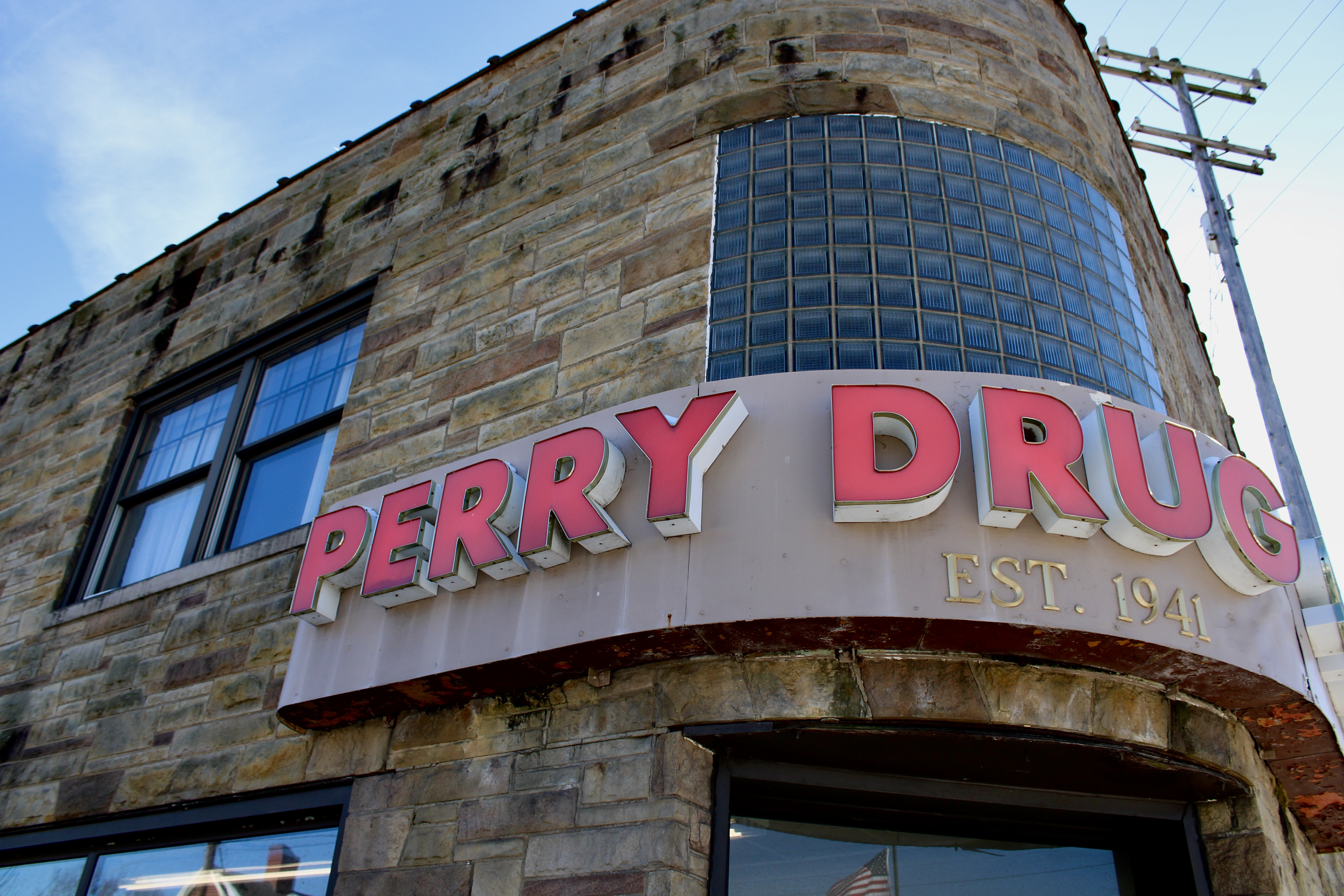
Perry Drugstore in downtown Perryopolis (1941)

George Washington purchased 1,644 acres (6.65 km^{2}) here when land first became available. He visited in 1770 and said, "as fine a land as I have ever seen, a great deal of rich meadow; it is well watered and has a valuable mill seat." The mill would eventually be completed in 1776. Once the mill was finished, it encouraged other business to come to the area to support and augment the business of the mill.

Washington hoped to develop the remainder of Perryopolis, drawing up plans for the streets to be laid out in the shape of a wagon-wheel. Washington's estate sold the land after his death; in 1814 Perryopolis, previously known as "New Boston", was officially laid out using Washington's plans and named for Oliver Hazard Perry for his victory on Lake Erie during the War of 1812.

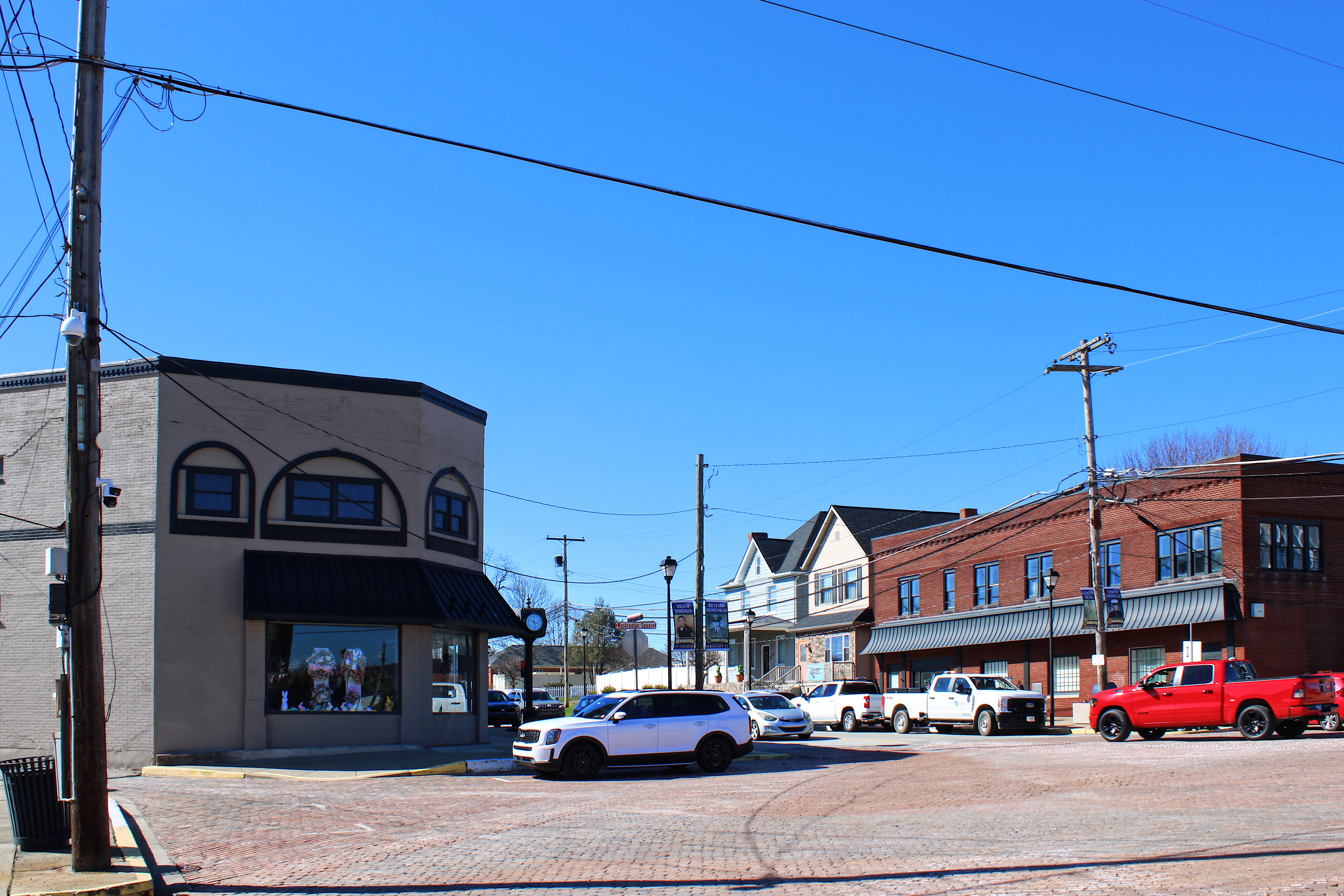
Perryopolis in 2026

In the late 19th century, the area around Perryopolis was first mined for coal. Until the 1950s, coal industries would be the area's primary economic activity, served by the Washington Run branch of the P&LE Railroad that continued on to Star Junction. However, Perryopolis developed differently from other nearby mining towns. Instead of housing laborers, Perryopolis was mainly inhabited by foremen and white collar workers who were associated with the mining industry.

The Karolcik Building, St. Nicholas Byzantine Catholic Church, Searight's Fulling Mill, and Youghiogheny Bank of Pennsylvania are listed on the National Register of Historic Places.

== Geography ==
Perryopolis is located in northern Fayette County at 40°5′9″N 79°45′8″W (40.085969, -79.752088). Pennsylvania Route 51 passes through the west side of the borough, leading north 31 miles (50 km) to Pittsburgh and south 15 miles (24 km) to Uniontown.

According to the U.S. Census Bureau, the borough has a total area of 1.53 square miles (3.97 km^{2}), all land.

Perryopolis is the center of the Frazier School District.

Washington Run, a tributary of the Youghiogheny River, flows through Perryopolis.

== Demographics ==
Historical population
| Census | Pop. | Note | %± |
|---|---|---|---|
| 1880 | 321 | | — |
| 1960 | 1,799 | | — |
| 1970 | 2,043 | | 13.6% |
| 1980 | 2,139 | | 4.7% |
| 1990 | 1,833 | | −14.3% |
| 2000 | 1,764 | | −3.8% |
| 2010 | 1,784 | | 1.1% |
| 2020 | 1,705 | | −4.4% |
| 2021 (est.) | 1,675 | ▼ | −1.8% |

As of the 2000 census, there were 1,764 people, 798 households, and 513 families residing in the borough. The population density was 989.6 inhabitants per square mile (382.1/km^{2}). There were 831 housing units at an average density of 466.2 per square mile (180.0/km^{2}). The racial makeup of the borough was 99.21% White, 0.11% African American, 0.28% Asian, and 0.40% from two or more races. 0.17% of the population were Hispanic or Latino of any race.

There were 798 households, out of which 22.6% had children under the age of 18 living with them, 52.4% were married couples living together, 9.8% had a female householder with no husband present, and 35.7% were non-families. 33.0% of all households were made up of individuals, and 20.8% had someone living alone who was 65 years of age or older. The average household size was 2.21 and the average family size was 2.81.

In the borough, the population was spread out, with 17.7% under the age of 18, 6.9% from 18 to 24, 25.1% from 25 to 44, 26.0% from 45 to 64, and 24.3% who were 65 years of age or older. The median age was 45 years. For every 100 females, there were 86.9 males. For every 100 females age 18 and over, there were 82.2 males.

The median income for a household in the borough was $33,092, and the median income for a family was $43,676. Males had a median income of $34,667 versus $23,854 for females. The per capita income for the borough was $17,829. 6.8% of the population and 4.3% of families were below the poverty line. Out of the total population, 7.8% of those under the age of 18 and 5.3% of those 65 and older were living below the poverty line.

Photo gallery

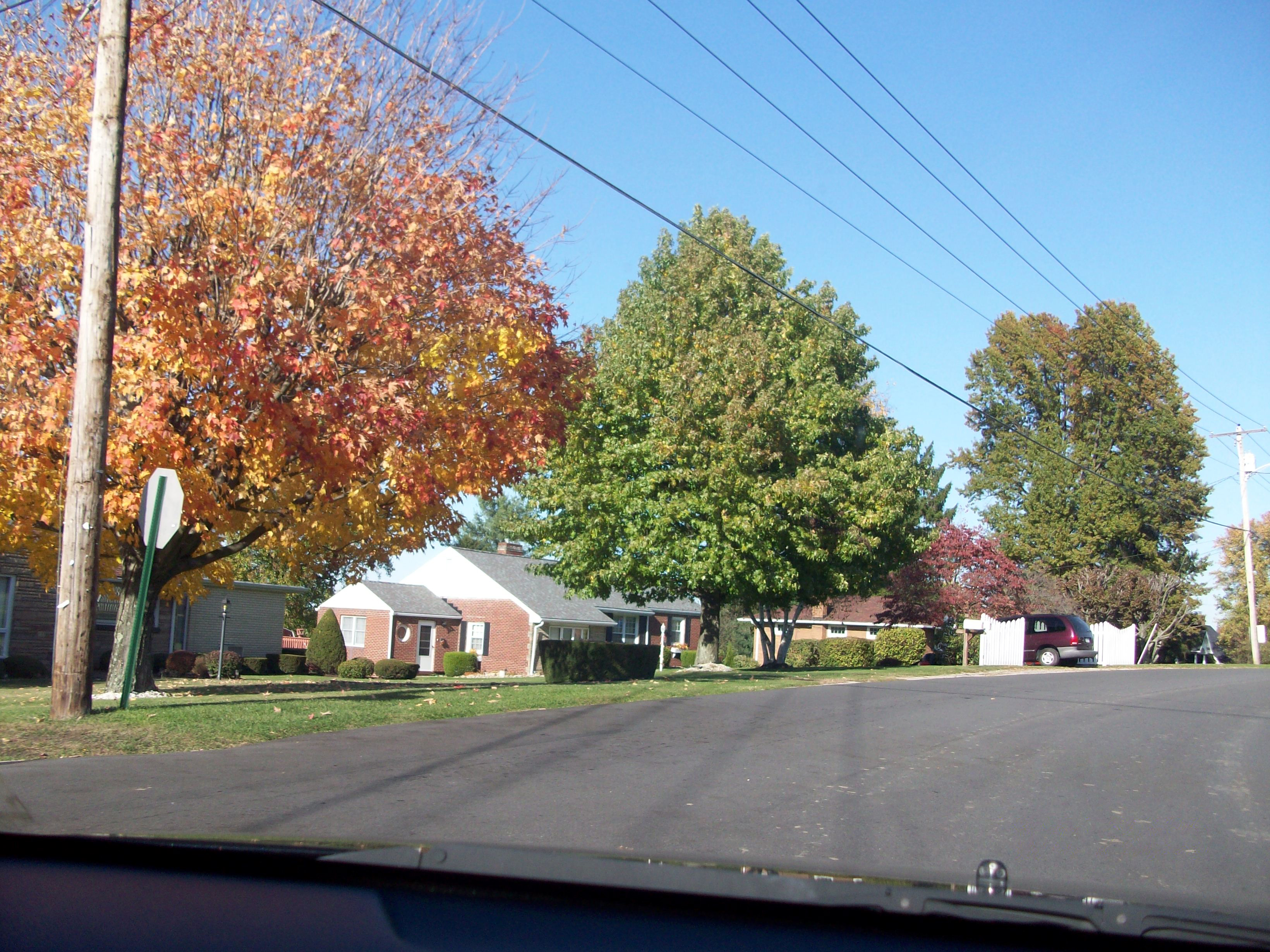
Typical mid-20th century housing

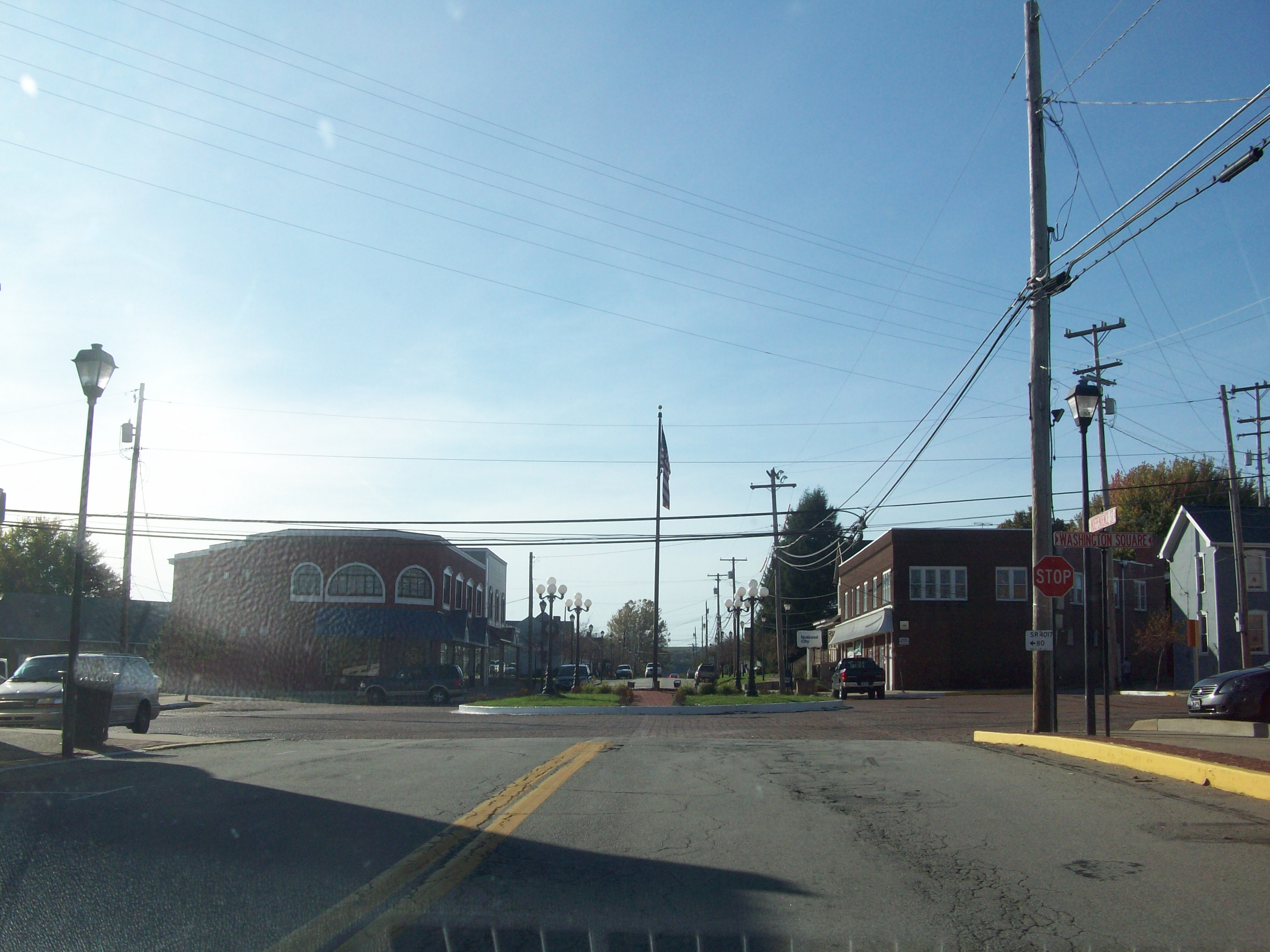
Town square

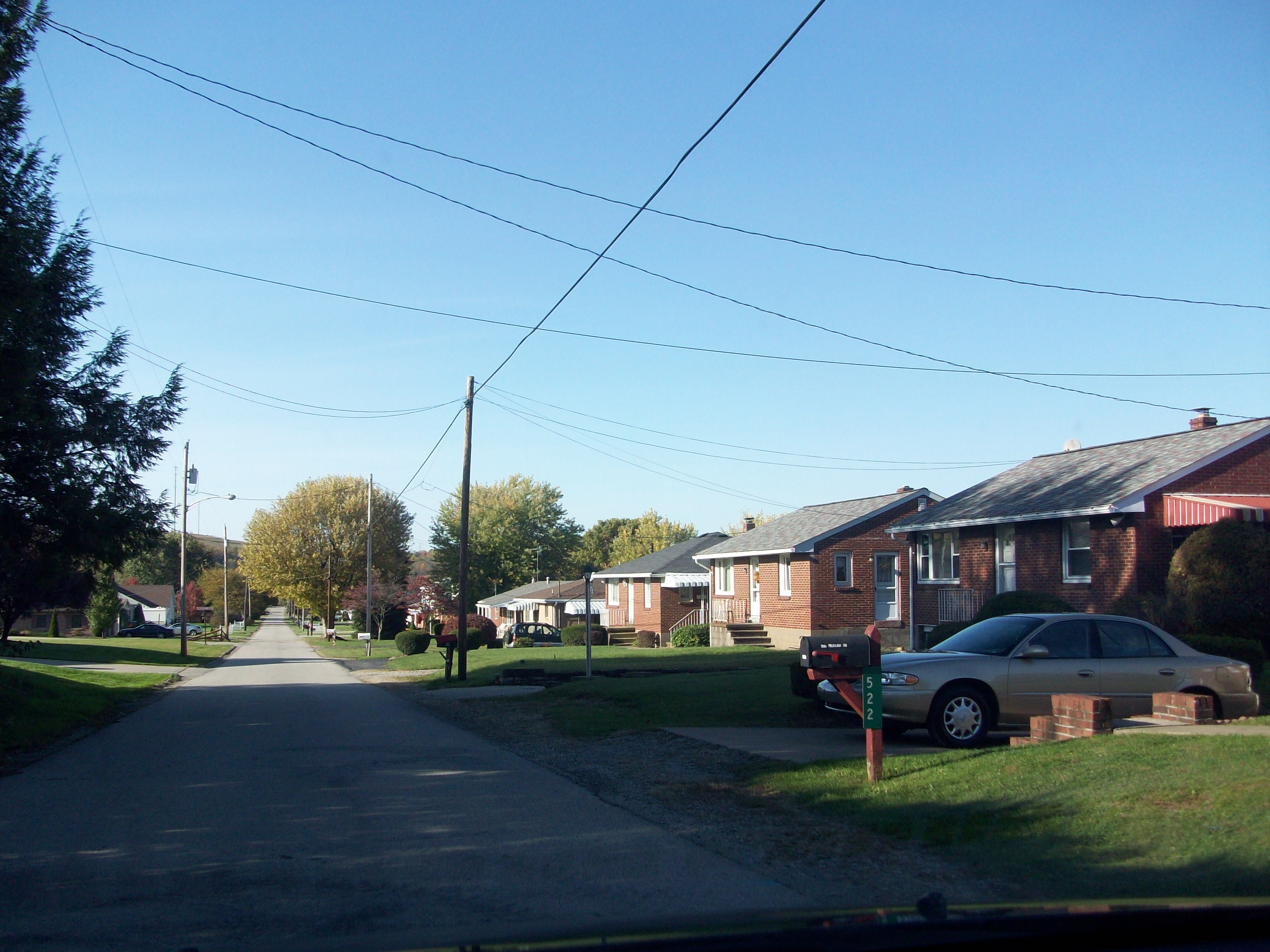
Suburban-style housing

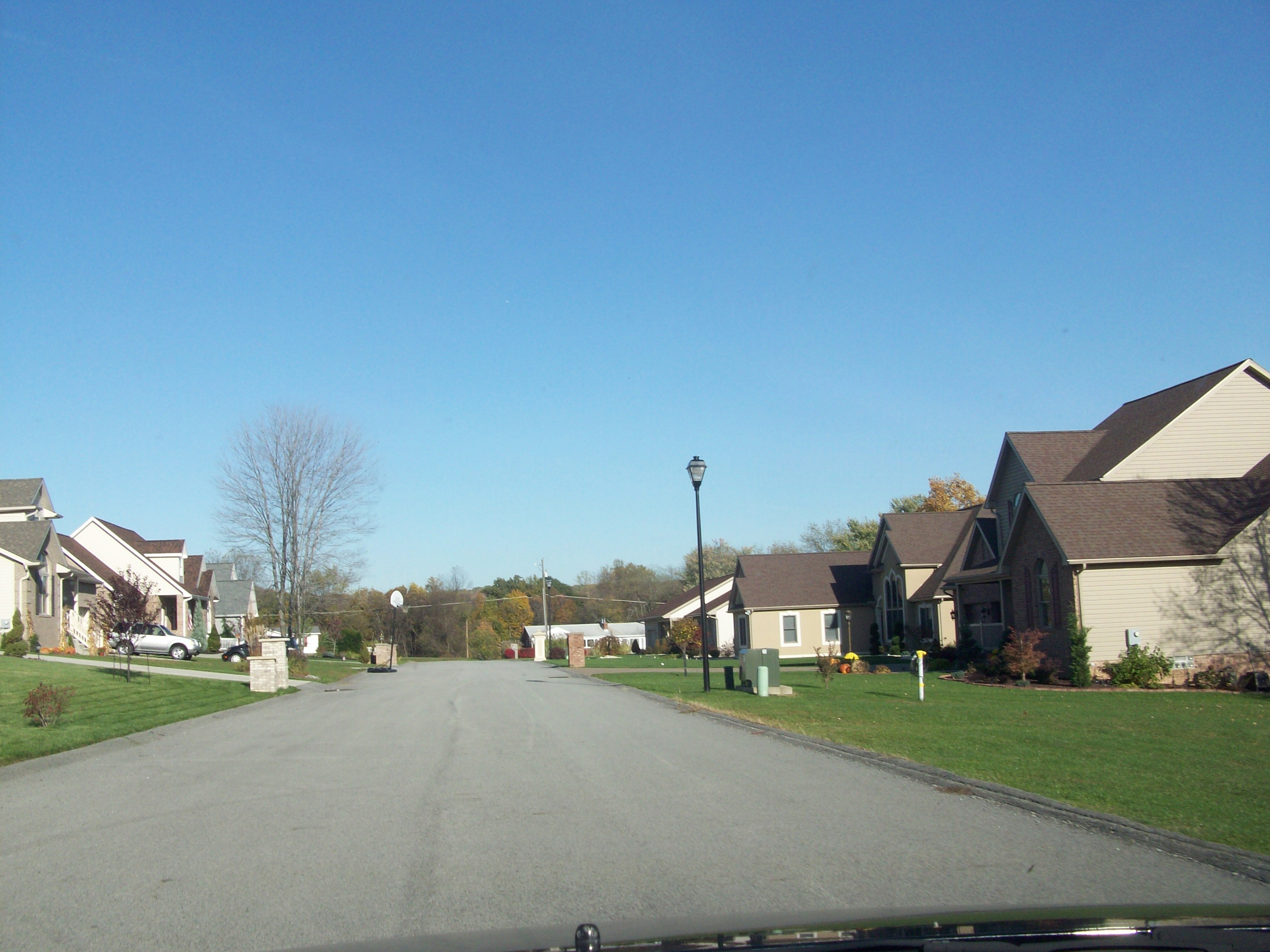
New housing development

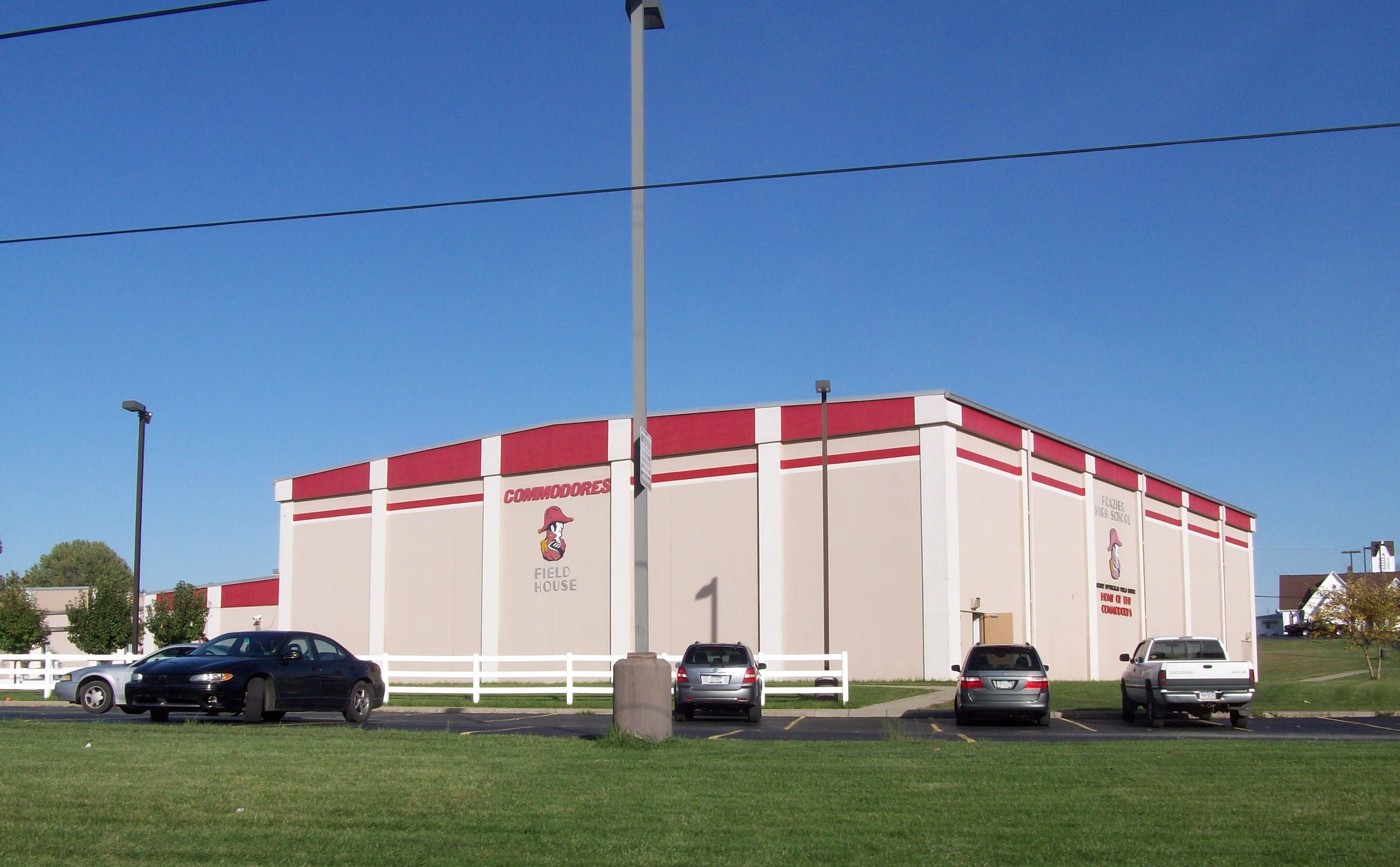
Frazier High School

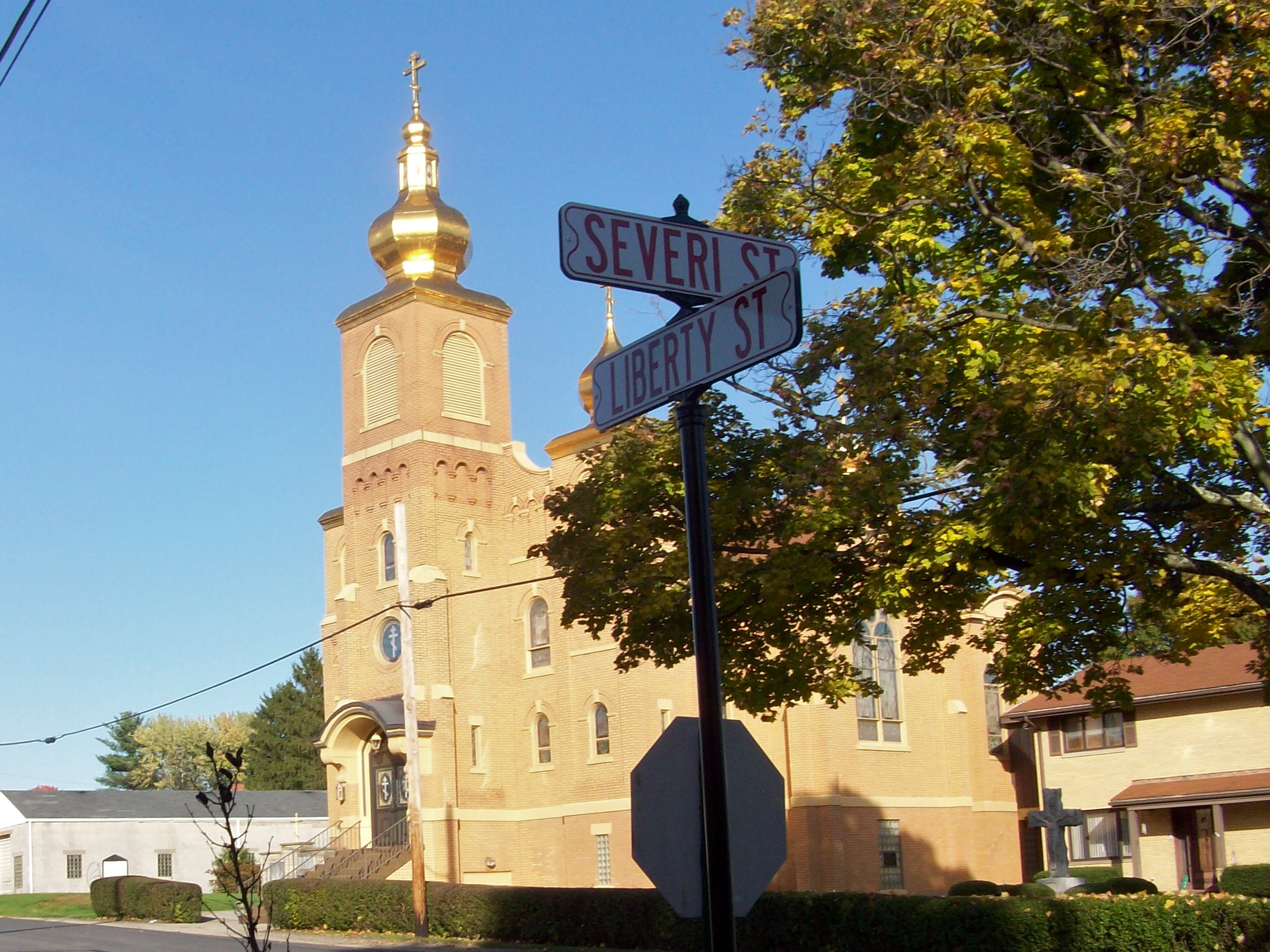
St. Nicholas Greek Catholic Church

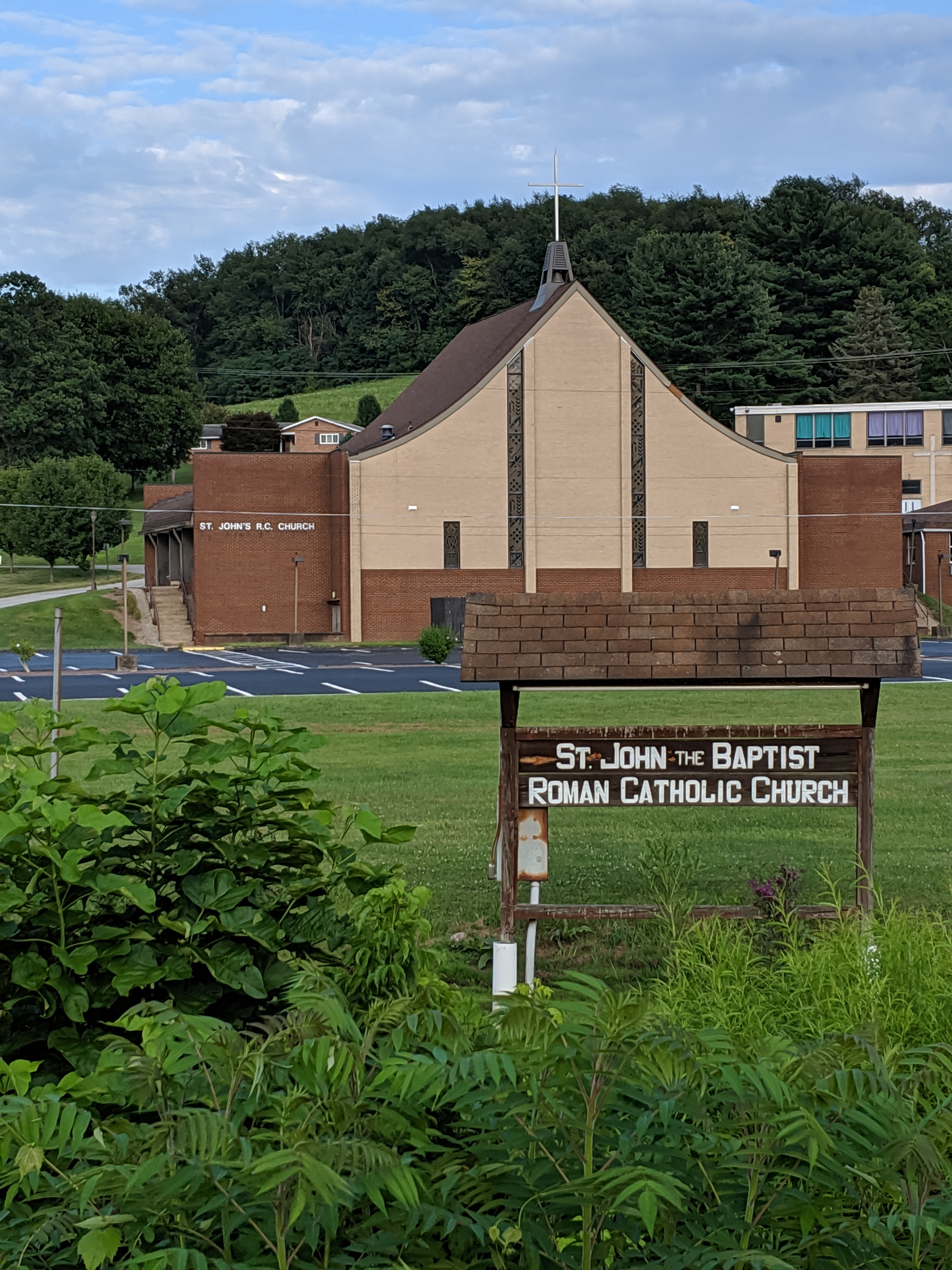
St. John the Baptist Roman Catholic Church
