= Deftones discography =

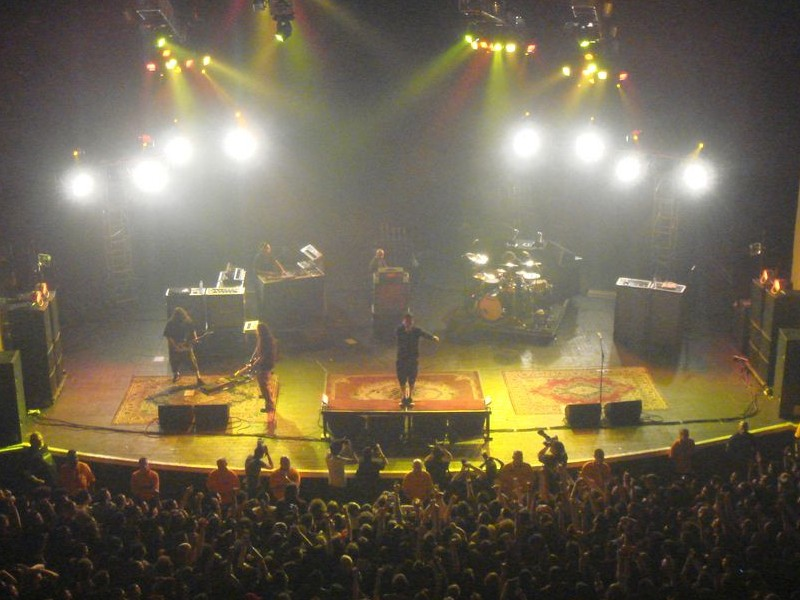
- Deftones performing live on April 14, 2007 at the Brixton Academy, London. Left to right: Stephen Carpenter, Chi Cheng (foreground), Frank Delgado (background), Chino Moreno and Abe Cunningham.
- Studio albums: 10
- Extended plays: 4
- Compilation albums: 3
- Singles: 26
- B-sides: 52
- Video albums: 1
- Music videos: 34
- Promotional singles: 5

The discography of Deftones, an American alternative metal band, consists of ten studio albums, four extended plays, three compilation albums, six demo albums, 34 music videos, 26 singles, and five promotional singles. Their back-catalogue of B-side material encompasses 52 tracks. The band has one multi-platinum, two platinum, and three gold records as designated by the RIAA.

Deftones formed in 1988 in Sacramento, California. Their first commercially released album was Adrenaline, in 1995. It peaked at number 23 in the Billboard Heatseekers Albums chart, its success attributable to word-of-mouth and rigorous touring and live performance. 1997's Around the Fur was far more successful, peaking at number one on the Billboard Heatseekers Albums chart, and at number 29 on the Billboard 200. It was also their first international success, entering the UK Albums Chart at number 56. The album provided their first ever charting singles, "My Own Summer (Shove It)" and "Be Quiet and Drive (Far Away)". White Pony was released in 2000 to critical acclaim and unprecedented commercial success, peaking at number three in the US. Singles "Change (In the House of Flies)" and "Digital Bath" supported the album's release. A single entitled "Back to School (Mini Maggit)" was released as a rap-influenced reinterpretation of White Pony's closing track, "Pink Maggit", and was provided for free to owners of White Pony due to its original release on Enhanced CD media. White Pony was subsequently re-released with "Back to School (Mini Maggit)" as the album's opening track.

The eponymous Deftones was released in 2003, peaking at number two in the US, and garnering widespread international success. B-Sides & Rarities saw a release in 2005, bringing together unreleased and obscure material accrued since 1995. 2006's Saturday Night Wrist, completed after a protracted and tumultuous recording process, reached number ten in the US. "Hole in the Earth" peaked at number 18 on the Billboard Alternative Songs chart, while "Mein" only reached number 40 on the Mainstream Rock chart. The band's sixth album, Diamond Eyes, was released on May 4, 2010. It saw the release of the popular singles "Rocket Skates", "You've Seen the Butcher" and "Diamond Eyes". In November 2012, Deftones released their seventh studio album titled Koi No Yokan, which spawned the singles "Leathers", "Tempest", "Swerve City" and "Romantic Dreams". Their eighth studio album, Gore, was released on April 8, 2016, and spawned the singles "Prayers / Triangles", "Doomed User", and "Hearts / Wires". Ohms, Deftones' ninth album, was released in 2020 with the eponymous single "Ohms" and the single "Genesis". On August 22, 2025, Deftones released their tenth album titled Private Music, with "My Mind Is a Mountain" and "Milk of the Madonna" released as singles.

== Albums ==
=== Studio albums ===
List of studio albums, with selected chart positions and certifications
Title	Album details	Peak chart positions										Sales	Certifications
Title	Album details	US	AUS	AUT	CAN	FRA	GER	NLD	NZ	SWI	UK	Sales	Certifications
Adrenaline	Released: October 3, 1995; Label: Maverick, Warner; Formats: CD, CS, LP, digital download	—	—	—	—	—	—	—	—	—	—		RIAA: Platinum; ARIA: Gold; BPI: Gold
Around the Fur	Released: October 28, 1997; Label: Maverick, Warner; Formats: CD, CS, LP, digital download	29	—	—	86	41	—	99	—	—	56	UK: 222,523	RIAA: Platinum; ARIA: Gold; BPI: Gold; RMNZ: Gold
White Pony	Released: June 20, 2000; Label: Maverick; Formats: CD, CS, LP, digital download	3	2	39	8	6	11	27	14	68	13	UK: 132,812	RIAA: 2× Platinum; ARIA: Platinum; BPI: Gold; MC: Gold; RMNZ: Platinum
Deftones	Released: May 20, 2003; Label: Maverick; Formats: CD, LP, digital download	2	4	20	1	14	8	22	2	19	7		RIAA: Gold; ARIA: Gold; BPI: Silver; MC: Gold
Saturday Night Wrist	Released: October 31, 2006; Label: Maverick; Formats: CD, LP, digital download	10	26	18	4	33	24	63	8	31	33		RIAA: Gold; BPI: Silver; RMNZ: Gold
Diamond Eyes	Released: May 4, 2010; Label: Reprise, Warner; Formats: CD, LP, digital download	6	22	13	10	23	8	55	8	11	26		RIAA: Gold; BPI: Gold; RMNZ: Gold
Koi No Yokan	Released: November 13, 2012; Label: Reprise, Warner; Formats: CD, LP, digital download	11	16	25	13	30	17	28	8	22	30		BPI: Silver; RMNZ: Gold
Gore	Released: April 8, 2016; Label: Reprise, Warner; Formats: CD, LP, digital download	2	1	7	12	19	7	15	1	10	5		
Ohms	Released: September 25, 2020; Label: Reprise, Warner; Formats: CD, CS, LP, digital download	5	3	11	13	23	8	20	4	5	5	US: 294,000; UK: 6,587	
Private Music	Released: August 22, 2025; Label: Reprise, Warner; Formats: CD, CS, LP, digital download	5	3	3	6	5	5	4	2	4	2	US: 249,000; UK: 18,459	
"—" denotes a recording that did not chart or was not released in that territory.

=== Compilation albums ===
List of compilation albums, with selected chart positions and certifications
Title	Album details	Peak chart positions									Certifications
Title	Album details	US	AUS	AUT	CAN	BEL (WA)	FRA	GER	SWI	UK	Certifications
B-Sides & Rarities	Released: October 4, 2005; Label: Rhino, Maverick; Formats: CD, digital download	43	30	54	42	84	59	85	93	100	BPI: Silver
Covers	Released: April 16, 2011; Label: Reprise, Warner Bros.; Formats: LP	—	—	—	—	—	—	—	—	—	
The Vinyl Collection 1995–2011	Released: October 25, 2011; Label: Reprise, Warner Bros.; Formats: LP box set	—	—	—	—	—	—	—	—	—	
"—" denotes a recording that did not chart or was not released in that territory.

=== Demo albums ===
List of demo albums
Title	Album details
Answers/Hogburg Hop	Released: 1990; Label: Not on label; Format: Cassette
Deftones (Demo 1)	Released: 1991; Label: Not on label; Format: Cassette
The Deftones (Demo 2)	Released: November 1992; Label: Not on label; Format: Cassette
Engine Number Nine/7 Words	Released: Fall 1993; Label: Not on label; Format: Cassette
(Like) Linus	Released: 1996; Label: Not on label (Unauthorized Bootleg); Format: CD
Root/Nosebleed	Released: 1994; Label: Maverick; Format: Cassette

=== Video albums ===
List of video albums
Title	Album details
Music in High Places: Live in Hawaii	Released: August 27, 2002; Label: Image Entertainment; Format: DVD, PlayStation Portable Movie

=== Unreleased ===
List of unreleased albums
Title	Album details
Eros	Released: Unreleased; Tentative Release: 2008–2009; Label: Warner Bros.

== Extended plays ==
List of extended plays, with selected chart positions
Title	EP details	Peak chart positions			
Title	EP details	AUS	AUT	FRA	UK
Live	Released: April 10, 1998; Label: Maverick, Warner Bros.; Formats: CD	—	—	49	—
Back to School (Mini Maggit)	Released: March 12, 2001; Label: Maverick, Warner Bros.; Formats: CD	51	64	64	35
Live: Volume 1 – Selections from Adrenaline	Released: April 20, 2013 Record Store Day exclusive); Label: Reprise, Warner Bros.; Formats: LP	—	—	—	—
On Tour (Live)	Released: April 10, 2020; Label: DNA Digital; Formats: DL	—	—	—	—
"—" denotes a recording that did not chart or was not released in that territory.

== Singles ==
List of singles, with selected chart positions, showing year released and album name
Title	Year	Peak chart positions										Certifications	Album
Title	Year	US Bub.	US Alt.	US Main. Rock	US Rock	US Rock Air	AUS	CAN Rock	SCO	UK	UK Rock	Certifications	Album
"My Own Summer (Shove It)"	1997	—	—	—	—	—	—	—	33	29	—	RIAA: 2× Platinum; BPI: Gold; RMNZ: Platinum	Around the Fur
"Be Quiet and Drive (Far Away)"	1998	—	—	29	—	—	—	—	54	50	—	RIAA: 2× Platinum; BPI: Gold; RMNZ: Platinum	Around the Fur
"Change (In the House of Flies)"	2000	5	3	9	—	—	—	—	54	53	3	RIAA: 4× Platinum; BPI: Gold; RMNZ: 2× Platinum	White Pony
"Back to School (Mini Maggit)"	2000	—	27	35	—	—	—	—	—	—	3		White Pony
"Minerva"	2003	20	9	16	—	—	50	—	16	15	—	RIAA: Gold	Deftones
"Hexagram"	2003	—	—	—	—	—	—	—	72	68	11		Deftones
"Hole in the Earth"	2006	—	18	19	—	—	—	—	44	69	—	RIAA: Gold	Saturday Night Wrist
"Mein" (featuring Serj Tankian)	2007	—	—	40	—	—	—	—	—	—	—		Saturday Night Wrist
"Rocket Skates"	2010	— (Note: "Rocket Skates" did not enter the Billboard Bubbling Under Hot 100 Singles chart, but peaked at number 12 on the Hot Singles Sales chart.)	—	—	—	—	—	—	—	—	—		Diamond Eyes
"Diamond Eyes"	2010	—	16	10	14	—	—	—	—	—	19	RIAA: Gold	Diamond Eyes
"Sextape"	2010	—	—	—	—	—	—	—	—	—	—	RIAA: Platinum; BPI: Silver; RMNZ: Gold	Diamond Eyes
"You've Seen the Butcher"	2010	—	—	17	34	—	—	—	—	—	—		Diamond Eyes
"Leathers"	2012	—	—	—	—	—	—	—	—	—	—		Koi No Yokan
"Tempest"	2012	—	20	3	44	13	—	24	—	—	—		Koi No Yokan
"Swerve City"	2013	—	—	6	—	25	—	—	—	—	—		Koi No Yokan
"Romantic Dreams"	2013	—	—	11	—	46	—	—	—	—	—		Koi No Yokan
"Prayers / Triangles"	2016	—	36	8	39	31	—	—	—	—	37		Gore
"Doomed User"	2016	—	—	—	—	—	—	—	—	—	—		Gore
"Hearts / Wires"	2016	—	—	—	—	—	—	—	—	—	—		Gore
"Phantom Bride" (featuring Jerry Cantrell)	2016	—	—	8	—	24	—	—	—	—	—		Gore
"Ohms"	2020	—	40	3	31	19	—	42	92	—	—		Ohms
"Genesis"	2020	—	—	—	38	—	—	—	—	—	—		Ohms
"Ceremony"	2021	—	—	9	—	26	—	—	—	—	—		Ohms
"My Mind Is a Mountain"	2025	2	24	1	11	3	—	—	—	89	8		Private Music
"Milk of the Madonna"	2025	—	—	—	23	—	—	—	—	—	38		Private Music
"—" denotes a recording that did not chart or was not released in that territory.

== Promotional singles ==
List of singles, with selected chart positions, showing year released, certifications and album name
Title	Year	Peak chart positions		Certifications	Album
Title	Year	US Alt.	US Main. Rock	Certifications	Album
"7 Words"	1995	—	—		Adrenaline
"Bored"	1996	—	—		Adrenaline
"Around the Fur"	1997	—	—	RIAA: Gold	Around the Fur
"Digital Bath"	2001	16	38	RIAA: Gold	White Pony
"Bloody Cape"	2003	—	—		Deftones
"—" denotes a recording that did not chart or was not released in that territory.

== Other charted or certified songs ==
Title	Year	Peak chart positions						Certifications	Album
Title	Year	US Bub.	US Main	US Rock	CAN Rock	NZ Hot	UK Rock	Certifications	Album
"Passenger"	2000	—	—	—	—	—	—	RIAA: Platinum; RMNZ: Gold	White Pony
"Please, Please, Please Let Me Get What I Want"	2005	—	—	—	—	—	—	RIAA: Gold	B-Sides & Rarities
"Beware"	2006	—	—	—	—	—	—	RIAA: Gold	Saturday Night Wrist
"Cherry Waves"	2006	—	—	—	—	—	—	RIAA: Platinum; RMNZ: Gold; BPI: Silver	Saturday Night Wrist
"Beauty School"	2010	—	—	—	—	—	—	RIAA: Gold	Diamond Eyes
"Entombed"	2012	—	—	—	—	—	—	RIAA: Gold	Koi No Yokan
"Rosemary"	2012	—	—	—	—	—	—	RIAA: Platinum	Koi No Yokan
"Locked Club"	2025	—	—	33	—	17	40		Private Music
"Ecdysis"	2025	—	—	31	—	15	37		Private Music
"Infinite Source"	2025	3	2	15	16	9	18		Private Music
"Souvenir"	2025	—	—	35	—	—	—		Private Music
"CXZ"	2025	—	—	43	—	—	—		Private Music
"I Think About You All the Time"	2025	—	—	30	—	—	—		Private Music
"Cut Hands"	2025	—	—	41	—	—	—		Private Music
"~Metal Dream"	2025	—	—	49	—	—	—		Private Music
"Departing the Body"	2025	—	—	48	—	—	—		Private Music
"—" denotes a recording that did not chart or was not released in that territory.

== B-sides ==
=== Original material ===
Year	Song	Released on	Notes
1996	"Can't Even Breathe"	Escape from L.A. (OST)	
1996	"Teething"	The Crow: City of Angels (OST)	The band can also be seen performing this song during the Day of the Dead festival scene in the movie.
2000	"The Boy's Republic"	White Pony (limited edition)	Appears on editions with black and red covers.
2000	"Crenshaw Punch / I'll Throw Rocks at You"^{†}	"Change (In the House of Flies)"	On "Change (In the House of Flies)", it was simply titled "Crenshaw".
2003	"Lovers"	"Hexagram"	
2005	"Black Moon"	B-Sides & Rarities	Collaboration with B-Real of Cypress Hill.
2005	"Teenager (Idiot Version)"	B-Sides & Rarities	Collaboration with Idiot Pilot.
^{†}: Denotes track was included on B-Sides & Rarities.

=== Covers ===
Year	Song	Released on	Original artist	Notes
1995	"Please, Please, Please Let Me Get What I Want"^{†‡}	"7 Words"	The Smiths	
1996	"Night Boat"	B-Sides & Rarities	Duran Duran	iTunes exclusive bonus track.
1997	"Savory"^{†‡}	Far Soon (EP)	Jawbox	Featuring Jonah Matranga on vocals and John Gutenberger on guitar
1997	"The Chauffeur"^{†‡}	The Duran Duran Tribute Album	Duran Duran	
1997	"Sweetest Perfection"	Officially unreleased	Depeche Mode	
1998	"To Have and to Hold"	For the Masses	Depeche Mode	Contribution to a Depeche Mode tribute album
2000	"No Ordinary Love"^{†‡}	"Change (In the House of Flies)"	Sade	Features Jonah Matranga on vocals
2003	"Sinatra"^{†}	"Minerva"	Helmet	
2003	"Sleep Walk"^{‡}	"Minerva"	Santo & Johnny	
2004	"If Only Tonight We Could Sleep" (Live) ^{†‡}	MTV Icon 2004: The Cure	The Cure	
2005	"Wax and Wane"	B-Sides & Rarities	Cocteau Twins	
2005	"Simple Man"^{‡}	B-Sides & Rarities	Lynyrd Skynyrd	Features a guitar solo by Joe Fraulob
2006	"Drive"^{‡}	Saturday Night Wrist	The Cars	iTunes exclusive bonus track
2007	"Jealous Guy"	Instant Karma	John Lennon	iTunes exclusive bonus track; contribution to John Lennon tribute album
2010	"Do You Believe"^{‡}	Diamond Eyes	The Cardigans	iTunes exclusive bonus track
2010	"Ghosts"^{‡}	Diamond Eyes	Japan	iTunes exclusive bonus track
2010	"Caress"^{‡}	Diamond Eyes	Drive Like Jehu	iTunes exclusive bonus track
2015	"Milk"	"Milk"	Stormtroopers of Death	Split 7" single with Stormtroopers of Death for Record Store day
^{†}: Denotes track was included on B-Sides & Rarities. ^{‡}: Denotes track was included on Covers.

=== Acoustic versions ===
Year	Song	Released on	Taken from
1998	"Be Quiet and Drive (Far Away)"^{†}	Little Nicky [OST]	Around the Fur (1997)
2001	"Change (In the House of Flies)"^{†}	"Back to School (Mini Maggit)" [EP]	White Pony (2000)
2002	"Knife Prty"	Music in High Places: Live in Hawaii [DVD]	White Pony (2000)
2002	"The Boy's Republic"	Music in High Places: Live in Hawaii [DVD]	White Pony (2000)
2005	"Digital Bath"	B-Sides & Rarities	White Pony (2000)
2007	"Cherry Waves"	"Mein"	Saturday Night Wrist (2006)
2010	"You've Seen the Butcher (Midnight Airport Version)"	"You've Seen the Butcher"	Diamond Eyes (2010)
^{†}: Denotes track was included on B-Sides & Rarities.

=== Remixes ===
Year	Song	Released on	Taken from
1998	"Spasmolytic"	Remix Dystemper	Too Dark Park (1990)
2009	"Hole in the Earth (Renholdër Remix)"	Underworld: Rise of the Lycans	Saturday Night Wrist (2006)
2010	"Rocket Skates (M83 Remix)"	Rocket Skates	Diamond Eyes (2010)
2016	"Prayers / Triangles (Com Truise Remix)"	Single Release	Gore (2016)
2020	"Ceremony (WHOKILLEDXIX Ceremonial Version)"	Single Release	Ohms (2020)
2021	"Digital Bath (Telefon Tel Aviv Version)"	Single Release	White Pony (2000)
2021	"Feiticeira (Arca Remix)"	Single Release	White Pony (2020)

=== Live versions ===
All live tracks from the two "My Own Summer (Shove It)" singles, respectively, were compiled into a live EP entitled Live.

Year	Song	Released on	Taken from	Notes
1998	"Lotion"	"My Own Summer (Shove It)" [Disc one]	Around the Fur	Recorded live at the Melkweg, Amsterdam, on October 13, 1997.
1998	"Fireal— Swords"	"My Own Summer (Shove It)" [Disc one]	Adrenaline	Recorded live at the Melkweg, Amsterdam, on October 13, 1997.
1998	"Bored"	"My Own Summer (Shove It)" [Disc one]	Adrenaline	Recorded live at the Melkweg, Amsterdam, on October 13, 1997.
1998	"Root"	"My Own Summer (Shove It)" [Disc two]	Adrenaline	Recorded live at the Melkweg, Amsterdam, on October 13, 1997.
1998	"Nosebleed"	"My Own Summer (Shove It)" [Disc two]	Adrenaline	Recorded live at the Melkweg, Amsterdam, on October 13, 1997.
1998	"Lifter"	"My Own Summer (Shove It)" [Disc two]	Adrenaline	Recorded live at the Melkweg, Amsterdam, on October 13, 1997.
1998	"Birthmark"	"Be Quiet and Drive (Far Away)"	Around the Fur	
2001	"Feiticeira"	Back to School (Mini Maggit) [EP]	White Pony	Recorded in Seattle for KNDD.
2001	"Back to School (Mini Maggit)"	Back to School (Mini Maggit) [EP]	Back to School (Mini Maggit) [EP]	Recorded in Seattle for KNDD.
2001	"Nosebleed"	Back to School (Mini Maggit) [EP]	Adrenaline	Recorded in Chicago, November 8, 2000.
2001	"Teething"	Back to School (Mini Maggit) [EP]	(Like) Linus	Recorded in Chicago, November 8, 2000.
2006	"Hexagram"	"Hole in the Earth" [Disc one]	Deftones	
2006	"My Own Summer (Shove It)"	"Hole in the Earth" [Disc two]	Around the Fur	
2010	"Diamond Eyes"	"Sextape"	Diamond Eyes	
2010	"Root"	"Sextape"	Adrenaline	
2010	"Birthmark"	"You've Seen the Butcher"	Adrenaline	

== Music videos ==
List of music videos, showing year released and director
Title	Year	Director(s)	Album
"7 Words"	1995	Chris Burns	Adrenaline
"Bored"	1996	Nick Egan	Adrenaline
"My Own Summer (Shove It)"	1997	Dean Karr	Around The Fur
"Be Quiet and Drive (Far Away)"	1998	Purge	Around The Fur
"Be Quiet and Drive (Acoustic Remix)"	1998	Frank Ockenfels	Around The Fur
"Street Carp"	2000	James Sutton	White Pony
"Change (In the House of Flies)"	2000	Liz Friedlander	White Pony
"Back to School (Mini Maggit)"	2000	Paul Hunter	White Pony
"Digital Bath"	2001	Andrew Bennet	White Pony
"Minerva"	2003	Paul Fedor	Deftones
"Hexagram"	2003	Darren Doane	Deftones
"Bloody Cape"	2003	James Minchin III	Deftones
"Root"	2005	Nick Lambrou	Adrenaline
"Engine No. 9"	2005	Nick Lambrou	Adrenaline
"Hole in the Earth"	2006	Brian Lazzaro	Saturday Night Wrist
"Mein"	2007	Bernard Gourley	Saturday Night Wrist
"Rocket Skates"	2010	Timothy McGurr, Kenzo Digital	Diamond Eyes
"Diamond Eyes"	2010	Roboshobo	Diamond Eyes
"Sextape"	2010	ZFCL	Diamond Eyes
"You've Seen the Butcher"	2010	Zodeb	Diamond Eyes
"Beauty School"	2011	Timothy McGurr	Diamond Eyes
"Swerve City"	2013	Gus Black	Koi No Yokan
"Swerve City (Tour Version)"	2013	Ryan Mackfall	Koi No Yokan
"Romantic Dreams"	2013	Brett Novak	Koi No Yokan
"Prayers / Triangles"	2016	Charles Bergquist	Gore
"Ohms"	2020	Rafatoon	Ohms
"Genesis"	2020	Sebastian Kökow	Ohms
"Knife Prty" (Purity Ring Remix)	2020	Aaron Hymes	Black Stallion
"Passenger" (Mike Shinoda Remix)	2020	Aaron Hymes	Black Stallion
"Teenager" (Robert Smith Remix)	2020	Aaron Hymes	Black Stallion
"Change (In The House of Flies)" (Tourist Remix)	2020	Liz Friedlander	Black Stallion
"Ceremony"	2021	Leigh Whannell	Ohms
"My Mind Is a Mountain"	2025	Unknown	Private Music
"Infinite Source"	2025	GREATWORK	Private Music
