= C. K. McClatchy High School =

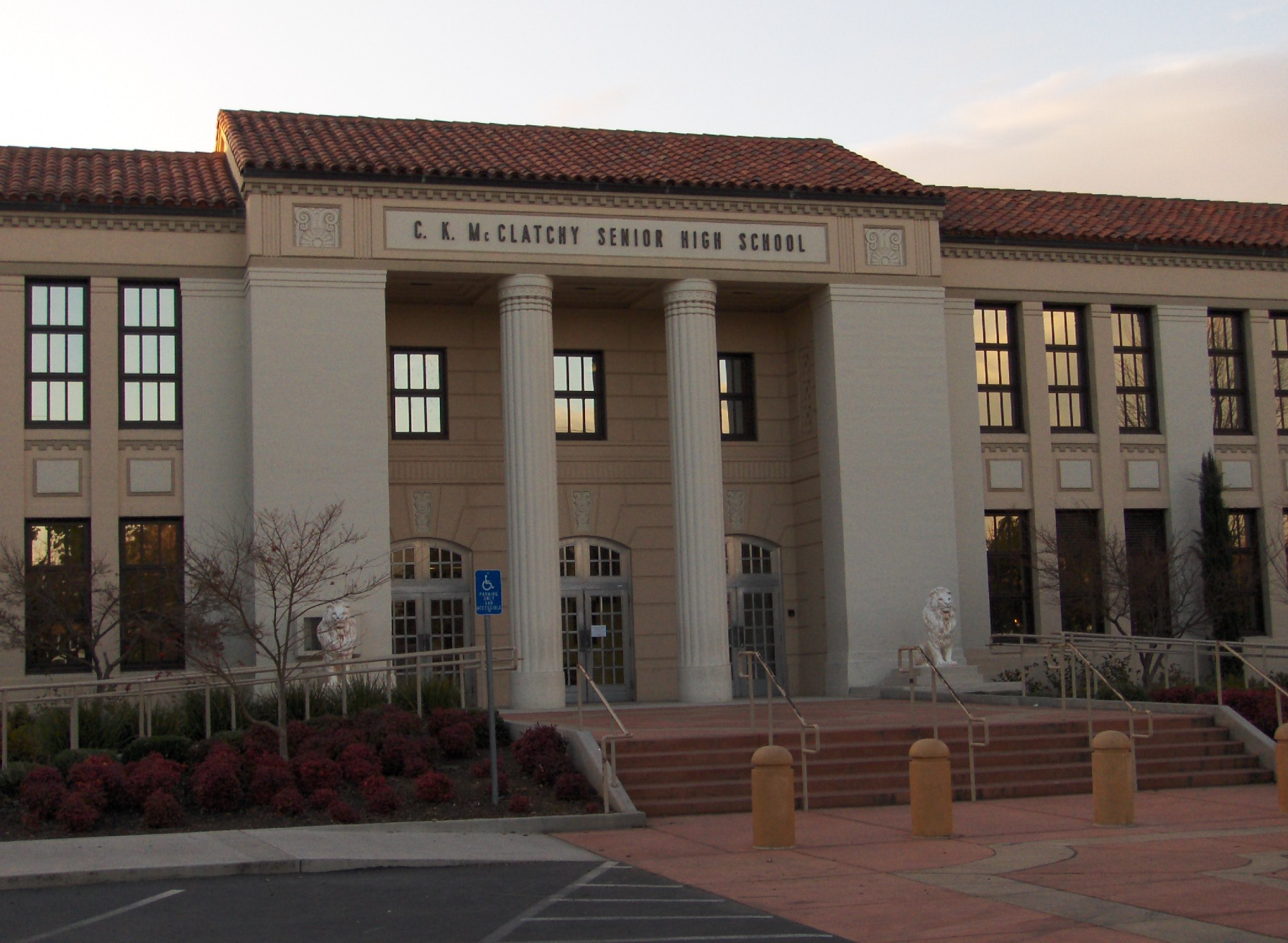

Location
- 3066 Freeport Boulevard; Sacramento, Sacramento County, California 95818; United States; 38°32′56″N 121°29′34″W

Information
- School type: Public
- Established: 1937
- School district: Sacramento City Unified School District
- Principal: Andrea Egan
- Teaching staff: 99.30 (FTE)
- Grades: 9-12
- Enrollment: 2,481 (2023-2024)
  - Grade 9: 666
  - Grade 10: 632
  - Grade 11: 624
  - Grade 12: 559
- Student to teacher ratio: 24.98
- Campus type: Closed Campus
- Colours: Maroon, white and grey
- Fight song: "McClatchy Fight Song"
- Mascot: Leo the lion
- Team name: Lions
- Rival: John F. Kennedy High School (Sacramento, California)
- Accreditation: Western Association of Schools and Colleges
- Newspaper: The Prospector
- Website: C.K. McClatchy High School

C. K. McClatchy High School, also known as McClatchy High School, is a high school in the Sacramento City Unified School District. It is located in the Land Park area of Sacramento, California. Established in 1937, it is the oldest operating high school in the district, having succeeded crosstown rival Sacramento High School following the latter's closure in 2003. McClatchy High School has over fifty clubs and over 50,000 alumni.

== History ==
Population growth in the city of Sacramento during the 1930s prompted the construction of C.K. McClatchy Senior High School, the city's second high school. Construction financing came from local sources as well as the Works Progress Administration (WPA), a New Deal economic stimulus program instituted by President Franklin Roosevelt.

The school's design was done by local architectural firm of Starks and Flanders, whose existing portfolio included downtown landmarks such as the Elks Temple, the U.S. Post Office, and the Courthouse.

Named for local businessman Charles Kenny McClatchy, local dignitaries and students from the city's junior high schools gathered to watch the laying of the school's cornerstone on May 20, 1937. C.K., who had died the previous year, was a confidant of California Governor Hiram Johnson, and had built the small local newspaper he inherited from his father into what would become the NYSE listed McClatchy Company.

On September 19, 1937, the school was officially dedicated. Sitting on 30 acres (120,000 m^{2}), the school included a shooting range, and a band room complete with soundproof practice rooms as well as dressing and music rooms near the auditorium. A nurse's suite with bathrooms and a sun porch and a quartered garden with central fountain in the Moorish style were also features of the new campus.

The school has served students in the Sacramento area for over 70 years. Many local, state, national, and international figures have graduated from McClatchy. Current enrollment is around 2,400 students.

In 2002, the school was officially listed on the National Register of Historic Places.

McClatchy's newspaper, The Prospector, has been serving students for 75 years.

== Statistics ==
=== Demographics ===
2016-17

White	African American	Asian	American Indian	Latino	Two or More Races
24.4%	8.6%	15.8%	0.8%	41.6%	5.9%

=== Standardized Testing ===
SAT Scores for 2015-16
	Reading Average	Math Average	Writing Average
McClatchy High	524	521	500
School District	465	474	452
Statewide	484	494	477

== Academics ==
In 2005, C.K. McClatchy High School began to be recognized as a California Distinguished School. Since then, McClatchy continues to be unique among California high schools by “beating the trends.” CKM's school-wide measure of achievement—the Academic Performance Index (API)—jumped 32 points to 745 in 2008, an additional 11 points in 2009 to 756, and the trend is expected to continue.

=== AFJROTC Unit CA-841 ===
The Air Force Junior Reserve Officer Training Corps works with students who desire to develop leadership potential. The open-enrollment program provides a scholastic program in the areas of aerodynamics, science, history and cultural awareness.

=== Criminal Justice Academy ===
The Criminal Justice Academy is offered through a partnership with the Sacramento Police Department. Students study the basic course materials used by those in training to be police cadets. Additionally, the curriculum covers investigative procedures, forensic science, physical training and principles of the law.

=== Humanities and International Studies Program ===
The Humanities and International Studies Program (abbreviated as HISP) was founded in 1985. It is an honors program designed to focus on literature and cultural studies.

=== Law & Public Policy Academy ===
The Law & Public Policy Academy's mission is to immerse students in cross-curricular law and public policy based projects and activities. Students study the history of the American legal system as well as criminal prosecution methodologies.

=== Visual and Performing Arts Program ===
The Visual and Performing Arts Program (abbreviated as VAPA) is an arts program designed for students to explore careers in the fields of art, entertainment, and media. It was founded in 2016.

== Notable alumni ==
=== Politics and Judiciary ===
- Jeff Adachi - Former Public Defender of San Francisco (2003–2019)
- Xavier Becerra - Former U.S. representative and California A.G., sitting Governor-elect of California (2027- )
- Tani Cantil-Sakauye - Former Chief Justice of California (2011–2023)
- Anthony Kennedy - Associate Justice of the Supreme Court of the United States (1988 – 2018)
- Robert Matsui - Former member of the United States House of Representatives (1979 – 2005)
- Deborah Ortiz - Former member, California State Senate, State Assembly, Sacramento City Council (1993 – 2006)

=== Athletics ===
- Brian Bedford - former NFL and CFL wide receiver
- Larry Bowa - MLB Network analyst and former MLB shortstop and coach
- Steve Brown - Defensive coordinator of the Kentucky Wildcats and former NFL defensive back
- Kevin Clark - former NFL defensive back
- Gene Cronin - former NFL defensive end
- Malcolm Floyd - former NFL wide receiver and former C. K. McClatchy High School football coach
- Steve Holm - former MLB catcher
- Dion James - 11-year MLB outfielder
- Nick Johnson - former MLB first baseman
- Hannah Keane - Professional Soccer Player in Germany, Portugal, Spain and Australia
- Malcolm Moore - professional baseball catcher in the Texas Rangers organization
- Rowland Office - former MLB outfielder
- Bill Putnam - college basketball player and coach
- Vance Worley - Pitcher for the Philadelphia Phillies

=== Arts and entertainment ===
- Stephen Carpenter - lead guitarist of Deftones and Kush.
- Abe Cunningham - drummer of the Deftones and Phallucy.
- Joan Didion - writer
- Kurt Edward Fishback, photographer
- June Millington - lead guitarist of the band Fanny
- Chino Moreno - lead vocalist of Deftones, as well as the bands Team Sleep, Palms and Crosses.
- Channing Pollock - magician and film actor
- Mel Ramos- visual artist
- Roger Voudouris - singer and record producer

=== Education ===
- Michael Drake - physician and president of the University of California system

=== The Sciences ===
- Curt Michel - NASA astronaut
