= Diamond Eyes (disambiguation) =

Diamond Eyes is an album by Deftones.

Diamond Eyes may also refer to:

- "Diamond Eyes" (song), the title song from the 2010 album Diamond Eyes
- "Diamond Eyes (Boom-Lay Boom-Lay Boom)", a 2010 song by Shinedown
- "Diamond Eyes", a song by Eddie Benjamin and Sia from the EP Emotional
- Diamond Eyes: The Series, a Thai film series
