= Sextape (song) =

Single by Deftones

from the album Diamond Eyes
- B-side: "Diamond Eyes (Live)"; "Root (Live)"
- Released: October 1, 2010
- Studio: The Pass (Los Angeles)
- Genre: Shoegaze
- Length: 4:02
- Label: Reprise
- Songwriters: Stephen Carpenter; Abe Cunningham; Chino Moreno; Frank Delgado; Sergio Vega
- Producer: Nick Raskulinecz

Deftones singles chronology
"Rocket Skates" (2010)	"Sextape" (2010)	"You've Seen the Butcher" (2010)

Music video
- "Sextape" on YouTube

"Sextape" is а song by the American alternative metal band Deftones from their sixth studio album, Diamond Eyes (2010). It was released as the third single from the album by Reprise Records on October 1, 2010. Musically, "Sextape" is a shoegaze song that has been described as one of Deftones' most sensual works. Critics noted the song's atmospheric textures and highlighted its contrast to the band's heavier material. Lyrically, the frontman Chino Moreno described the song as an abstract expression meant to "paint a picture of a feeling", with interpretations ranging from sensual imagery to broader themes of emotional connection and introspection.

The accompanying music video, directed by Zak Forrest and Chad Liebenguth of ZFCL, premiered on September 3, 2010, and preceded the songs' release as a single in October. Upon Diamond Eyes' release, "Sextape" received generally positive comments. It has since become a fan favorite and staple of Deftones' live performances, and has earned multiple certifications, including Platinum in the United States, Silver in the United Kingdom, and Gold in New Zealand.

== Music and lyrics ==
Musically, "Sextape" is a shoegaze song that has been described as one of Deftones' most sensual works. Walter Tunis of the Lexington Herald-Leader called it "the closest thing the Deftones offered to a slice of pure pop reflection", while Ian Cohen of Uproxx noted that it avoids the band's usual reliance on metal sounds in favor of an "oceanic groove". Revolver's Gregory Adams compared the song to "Cherry Waves", finding that "Sextape" carried a "gentle emo drive". Chuck Campbell in the Knoxville News Sentinel wrote that Deftones return to their "distinctive dreamy maelstroms" on the "sweet-swirling" track, while Carla Meyer writing for The Kansas City Star characterized it as "hypnotic", "more balm than blast", and reflective of the therapeutic atmosphere of the recording sessions for their sixth studio album Diamond Eyes (2010).

"Sextape" is built on what the frontman Chino Moreno described as "three notes that go through the whole" song, which he called "lush and beautiful". According to Andrew Burgess of MusicOMH, the track "opens with delay-heavy guitar and keyboard interplay", while Sputnikmusic's Simon K. noted its "wonderfully spacey reverb guitar parts". Jason Pettigrew writing for Alternative Press highlighted its "jangly tremolo guitars a la U2" (Note: The effect used both on the song and by U2 is delay, not tremolo.) and the keyboardist Frank Delgado's "soothing textures", describing the song as "a delicate respite". In Slant Magazine, Matthew Cole observed that the band's guitarists create "a perfectly lovely wall of early Pumpkins/Cocteau Twins–inspired dream-pop". Pettigrew described Moreno's singing as "gentle pillow talk", while Cole wrote that he "spoils things by aiming the chorus straight for the Bono-sphere". Burgess added that the song "culminates with a celestial hook that wouldn't have sounded out of place on an Incubus album".

Moreno described the lyrics to "Sextape" as emerging from an abstract and emotional process rather than a literal one, saying he had "no recollection of writing the words" and that he aimed to "paint a picture of a feeling". Adams wrote that Moreno appears "lubed-up for 'hours of pleasure' once the 'ocean takes [him] in'", interpreting the lyrics "the sound of the waves collide" as a "flowerier description of an ecstatic, earth-shattering sex scene". Aarik Danielson of the Columbia Daily Tribune also observed that Moreno "describes connection as collision, ocean waves meeting one another". Maura Johnston of The Boston Globe called the song "searching and cavernous", with Moreno "looking for metaphysical clarity and closure while tethered to Earth". Brad Barrett of Drowned in Sound noted that even the song's intro carries "a moment of soothing clarity", enhanced by "layers of salacious lyrical harmonics" and "freewheeling imagery".

== Release ==
The music video for "Sextape" premiered on September 3, 2010. It was directed by the team ZFCL, consisting of Zak Forrest and Chad Liebenguth. The video was first shown exclusively on NME's website and was described by Cohen as featuring "two women making out underwater". Following the premiere of its music video, NME revealed that the song was planned to be released as a single in the United Kingdom on October 4, 2010. "Sextape" was released as the third single from Diamond Eyes through Reprise Records on October 1, 2010. On the issue dated November 6, 2010, the song peaked at number 32 on the Billboard Mexico Ingles Airplay chart. The song received multiple certifications years after its release. In 2024, it was certified Gold by Recorded Music NZ (RMNZ) for sales exceeding 15,000 sales in New Zealand. The following year, it earned a Silver certification from the British Phonographic Industry (BPI) for over 200,000 sales in the United Kingdom and was certified Platinum by the Recording Industry Association of America (RIAA) for sales of over 1,000,000 sales in the United States.

== Reception and legacy ==
"Sextape" received generally positive comments upon the release of Diamond Eyes. Brian McCollum writing for the Detroit Free Press praised it as one of the album's "textured" highlights, calling it an "exquisitely constructed" track that combines "muscle and hot groove into an expansive whole", while The Monitor's Crystal Olvera described it as "beautifully haunting". In contrast, Pete Menting of the Visalia Times-Delta criticized it as one of several songs on the album that were "way too slow". Retrospectively, the song has remained well regarded and has become a live favorite for the band. In 2020, Cohen ranked it as Deftones' tenth-best song.

== Personnel ==
Credits adapted from Diamond Eyes' liner notes.

Deftones

- Stephen Carpenter – guitar
- Abe Cunningham – drums
- Frank Delgado – keyboards, samples
- Chino Moreno – vocals, guitar
- Sergio Vega – bass

Production and recording

- Keith Armstrong – assisted mixing
- Paul Figueroa – recording, engineering
- Ted Jensen – mastering
- Nik Karpen – assisted mixing
- Chris Lord-Alge – mixing
- Nick Raskulinecz – producer, mixing
- Andrew Schubert – additional engineering
- Brad Townsend – additional engineering
- Tom Whalley – executive producer

== Charts ==
Chart performance for "Sextape"
Chart (2010)	Peak position
Mexico Ingles Airplay (Billboard)	32

== Certifications ==
Certifications for "Sextape"
Region	Certification	Certified units/sales
New Zealand (RMNZ)	Platinum	30,000^{‡}
United Kingdom (BPI)	Silver	200,000^{‡}
United States (RIAA)	Platinum	1,000,000^{‡}
^{‡} Sales+streaming figures based on certification alone.
