= Eros (Deftones album) =

Unreleased studio album by Deftones

Studio album by Deftones
- Released: Unreleased
- Recorded: April 14 – November 3, 2008 (unfinished)
- Studio: The Spot (Los Angeles)
- Label: Warner Bros.
- Producer: Terry Date

Eros is the working title of an unreleased album by American alternative metal band Deftones, with tentative release dates in 2008 and 2009. The band spent time recording the album from April to November 2008 at The Spot in Los Angeles. The recording sessions marked the first time in five years, since their self-titled fourth album, that Deftones had worked with producer Terry Date.

The November 2008 car accident of bassist Chi Cheng forced the band to initially hold off on completing the album, however, and they later shelved the album indefinitely in a creative decision to move forward. With Cheng in a coma, Deftones recruited former Quicksand bassist Sergio Vega and released Diamond Eyes instead in 2010. No material from the Eros sessions has been officially released—some songs have leaked online in various capacities, most prominently the song "Smile"—and the band has expressed mixed feelings about releasing the material in some capacity in the future.

== Background and recording ==
=== Precursors (2000–2006) ===
Beginning with the writing process and subsequent rigorous touring schedule to promote Deftones' 2000 album White Pony, the relationship among band members started to dissolve. This tension carried over to the recording of the group's fourth studio album, Deftones in 2003. Deftones were not pleased with the album they created and did not tour much in support of it. They soon started work on what would eventually become Saturday Night Wrist, a record that was pieced together with the members emailing each other their own recorded parts and not written as a full band. In the middle of recording Saturday Night Wrist, singer Chino Moreno went on a three-month tour with his side project Team Sleep. Deftones were on the verge of breaking up due to the unstable personal lives of each member both inside and outside of the band. This time period in the band's chronology is referred to by Deftones as "the Dark Days".

=== Resolutions and beginning to write Eros (2007) ===
Prior to the tour in support of Saturday Night Wrist, a meeting was held with Deftones and their management about the fate of the band. When asked if the members still wanted to continue as a band, "the answer was a unanimous, 'Fuck yeah we do,'" which resulted in a "huge powwow and hug session." This meeting was a major turning point for band morale. Hoping for a rapid turnaround from their previous album, Deftones quickly started writing music for Eros as early as May 2007, only seven months after Saturday Night Wrist was released, and continued writing throughout the remainder of the year. During their tour with The Fall of Troy, Deftones set up a room backstage each night to jam together as a whole band.

We're going in there and playing as five of us in the room with just our instruments, no other distractions. That's how we started out, basically, when we first started the band -- us in the garage, no ProTools or anything to get us ahead of ourselves. We'd just play things over and over again, until we remembered it -- that's the rawest way you can do it, and the best, I think.

— Chino Moreno, Billboard

In October 2007, Deftones returned to their home in California and revamped their studio, The Spot. According to Carpenter, the studio became more of a clubhouse or "treehouse with a studio in it". The band built a bar in the studio and would go there to drink, play cards and hang out before picking up their instruments each day. Deftones used their pre-production time as therapy to vent about their lives in a positive environment. At this time, several members were going through divorces, custody battles over their children, money issues and other problems. By the end of October, Deftones had written half of an album, and continued to write throughout the rest of 2007 with intentions to self-produce the material in the following year.

=== Recording and Cheng's accident (2008) ===
A still from "Eros In-Studio Video 4," one of the five recording-update videos Deftones posted online in 2008 before production was halted. The image depicts bassist Chi Cheng practicing an unknown song from the Eros sessions with his fellow band members.

The working title of "Eros" was announced in January 2008. The tentative title stemmed from an inside joke between the band members. Drummer Abe Cunningham stated that while touring Germany, "There'd always be some sort of German porn, and they would always say [in heavy, lust accent], 'Eros.' it was just kind of funny, and it's been a joke for years." Deftones officially entered the studio on April 14, 2008 with producer Terry Date (who they had worked with on their first four studio albums, from 1995's Adrenaline through 2003's Deftones) and engineer Scott Olson. For the first time in the group's history, Deftones created a blog specifically to update fans on the progress of recording. In September 2008, Deftones began playing the new song "Melanie" during live performances. Around this time, Date began mixing some of the songs at his home studio in Seattle, Washington. They had also planned on releasing one video of studio updates online per week leading up to the album's release, but only released five before production was put on hold.

Cheng was on his way home returning from his brother's memorial service on November 3, 2008, when he was involved in a serious car accident. Moreno had just left the studio after recording vocal tracks for Eros, and was about halfway done with his vocal work on the album when the accident occurred. Cheng was rushed to an ICU and was later announced to be in a coma. All production on the album halted, with the main focus of the band members on Cheng's condition.

=== Shelving Eros, new albums, Cheng's death and "Smile" (2009–2014) ===
With production on Eros still on hold, Deftones recruited former Quicksand bassist Vega to fill in for various festival shows and also fundraising concerts for Cheng's hospital bills in early 2009. Vega had previously filled during 1999 tours after Cheng underwent foot surgery. In July 2009, Deftones announced they had indefinitely shelved Eros in favor of work on a new album written with Vega. At the time, only about six songs were completed for Eros. Moreno estimated that Eros' instrumental portions were "probably 75-80% done" while the lyrics were about halfway completed, requiring about six more months of work to finish. Their decision to temporarily scrap the album and start over was a "purely creative" choice, and had nothing to do with the bassist's condition. Instead of finishing what they had started and releasing the nearly complete Eros, which was described as a dark album, Deftones wanted to write an optimistic and uplifting album to help cope with the situation with Cheng. The band used the same method of writing music as a group and avoiding Pro Tools that was used with the writing and recording of Eros.

The resulting album, Diamond Eyes, was released on May 4, 2010. Deftones supported this release throughout 2010 and 2011 involving international tours. With Eros still shelved, Deftones began writing a second album with Vega in 2011, and released their follow-up to Diamond Eyes, titled Koi No Yokan, on November 13, 2012. Though Cheng was showing signs of improvement from his condition since the accident, he died on April 13, 2013 after his heart suddenly stopped, making Eros the last Deftones album Cheng worked on.

Unbeknownst to the rest of the band and record label—and not publicly revealed until years later in 2021—Moreno partnered with Shaun Lopez (Crosses, Far) and returned to the Eros demo tracks to mix, master and finalize the song "Smile". On April 13, 2014, the first anniversary of Cheng's death, Moreno uploaded the track "Smile" to the Deftones YouTube account, and became the first released material from the long-shelved album. The video was removed by Warner Music Group two days later due to copyright infringement. Deftones performed the song "Smile" live and dedicated it to Cheng at their own Dia de los Deftones festival in November 2019. For the band's seventh iteration of Dia de los Deftones in November 2026, they included "Melanie" in their set for the first time since 2008 and the third time in the band's history. After finishing the song, Moreno proclaimed to the audience, "this song doesn't exist."

== Musical style ==
Contrasted with the lighter and more atmospheric sound of Saturday Night Wrist, Eros was expected to be a heavier album. In 2008, prior to recording, the album had been described as the band's "most unorthodox piece of work" containing "that good old 'Fuck you, I hope you die!' aggression." On previous Deftones records, Moreno wrote some of the guitar parts with Stephen Carpenter, but Moreno stepped down from guitars to focus solely on vocals and lyrics, giving Carpenter full creative control over guitar composition. Whereas Moreno writes slower more mid-tempo songs, Carpenter writes "snappier", more uptempo songs. The songs he wrote for Eros were described as "energetic" and "dance-y." Eros was also later described as a very dark and experimental album that pushed each member's creative boundaries. Comparisons were drawn between the more experimental tracks and Pink Floyd's "lengthy spaced-out songs, psychedelic vibes and plenty of jamming" by Revolver. The song "Dallas" was specifically compared to the "big sounding, real mid-tempo" song "Minerva" from Deftones' self-titled album. In a 2010 interview with Vega, he described the Eros material as longer and more complex than the songs recorded for Diamond Eyes.

== Release ==
=== Initial release windows and shelving of material ===
Several tentative release dates for Eros were announced before it was shelved indefinitely. When the band started writing the album in 2007, a late 2008 release was expected. As late 2008 began to approach, the tentative release date was pushed back to early 2009, or simply "winter", as seen in the teaser studio videos. After Cheng's car accident, it was uncertain if the album would ever get released. After Deftones began playing shows in early 2009, a new tentative release date of October 2009 was announced.

However, Deftones started writing new music with Vega, and in June 2009, the band made the creative decision to hold off on releasing Eros indefinitely in favor of a new album, later called Diamond Eyes. At this point, the band still hoped to release Eros, but no date was announced. Feeling that the album is attached to the tragedy surrounding Cheng, the group would like to wait until enough time has passed for the songs to stand on their own merits. Ideally, Deftones would have preferred for Cheng to come out of his comatose state before the album's release. According to Moreno:

At this point, it was the last thing that Chi played on. But we haven't talked about how and when we'll do it. The best-case scenario would be that Chi would be back up on his feet and we'd be able to go out and tour the world with him again with that record.

— Chino Moreno, MyYearbook interview

=== Later comments on possible release ===
In May 2013, one month after Cheng's death, Moreno said the likelihood of Eros being released was greater now than ever before. He also added: "I actually went back and listened to some of it recently and... you know, I don't know when [we will put it out] or... but I feel it's a little more appropriate now for us to think about that [than it has been] in the last few years to think about." He later clarified that Deftones would likely release at least one more album after Koi No Yokan before considering an official release for Eros.

After Koi No Yokan's follow-up album Gore was released in 2016, Moreno seemed less interested in finishing Eros, citing the unfinished album's poor quality. He said he "wasn't too happy with the material we had" and that "some of the music was lacking a little bit". Moreno elaborated:

I had faith it was going to come together and be great in the end, but we never got to that point. Once Chi had his accident, everything came to a halt with the Eros sessions, so the idea of going back to that batch of songs, finishing them and have Sergio learn Chi's parts just hasn't felt like something that we're interested in doing. If the record were finished and we were just sitting on it, we probably would have put it out by now, maybe even given it away, just so that people can hear it, but it would take a lot more work to get it done. But when we get together, we're much more fascinated with where we are in this moment, trying to create something new.

— Chino Moreno, The Independent interview

In a 2020 interview, Abe Cunningham noted that the band wasn't satisfied with the quality of some of the songs and many were incomplete, but that Deftones had discussed possibly releasing some of the completed tracks in an EP format. In 2021, Moreno stated that aside from revisiting "Smile" in 2014, he has not opened the Eros sessions files on his hard drive since 2008. Unlike "Smile," Moreno would want the full band's input on finishing the Eros songs, but is hesitant to revisit these songs. He said, "As to where if I put those [Eros songs] on, it was gonna take me back to that time, which I didn't want to be in. And I'm still kind of hesitant to go back and listen. It's probably why I haven't opened it up and listened to a lot of it."

In 2025, the members of Deftones gave conflicting reports on the likelihood of Eros material being released in any capacity—unfinished demos, or picking up where they left off and completing the partially finished songs. Cunningham said in an interview that he personally would like to release the material at some point, and that the band discuss releasing the material "quite a lot." He also entertained the notion of releasing incomplete Eros songs in a box set with incomplete demos from the Saturday Night Wrist sessions, which grew in popularity after producer Bob Ezrin leaked the demos online himself. However, Moreno was less certain of completing the unfinished tracks for an official release, saying, "[Eros] will most likely never see the light of day." He said the band typically prefers to "capture the moment we're in today," citing as an example the band's desire to abandon demos crafted during the COVID-19 pandemic and start over fresh with new material for Private Music.

=== Internet leak ===
In June 2026, a user on an internet forum claimed to have obtained and distributed a leaked copy of the Eros demos. The leak was reported to include 11 songs from the Eros sessions ("Destiny," "Brenda," "Melanie," "Smile," "Margot," "Candy," "Sable," "Electra," "Trempest," "Diamond," and "Briana") as well as demos from Deftones' 2020 album Ohms. While some music news outlets reported on the incident, neither the band nor the label commented on the matter nor confirmed the authenticity of the leaked material at the time. Two months later in August 2026, Cunningham gave an interview with the German blog Laut.de where he stated teams were regularly searching the internet to find and remove posts sharing the leaked Eros material. He also expressed his deep disappointment that the leak happened, calling it "disrespectful" and said it made him "fucking furious." He elaborated, "This music should have been heard when it was ready, not in a half-finished state with terrible vocals where they were still experimenting with words and syllables."

== Legacy ==
A decade after it was shelved indefinitely and while still unreleased, Eros began appearing on music journalists' lists of top unreleased albums. In 2019, the album was listed on Kerrang!'s "12 Rock And Metal Albums That Never Were" list and Metal Hammer's "The Greatest Metal Records That Never Were" list. In 2021, Stereogum included Eros on the publication's list of "45 Lost Albums We Want To Hear." In 2024, Metal Injection added Eros to their list "10 Albums We're Still Patiently Waiting For," and in 2025 Screen Rant added Eros to their list "10 Legendary Unreleased Albums That We'd Absolutely Love To Hear".

== Working track titles ==
According to Chino Moreno, Deftones recorded 11 or 12 songs during the Eros sessions. The working titles of all songs from the Eros sessions were named after strippers. The song "Smile" was the only track to be mixed and mastered. Aside from returning to complete "Smile" years later, Moreno said the track "Dallas" is the most complete song from the original sessions.

- "Brenda"
- "Briana"
- "Candy"
- "Dallas"
- "Destiny"
- "Diamond"
- "Elektra"
- "Margot"
- "Melanie"
- "Trempest"
- "Sable"
- "Smile"

== Personnel ==
Deftones

- Stephen Carpenter – guitars
- Chi Cheng – bass guitar
- Abe Cunningham – drums
- Frank Delgado – keyboards, samples
- Chino Moreno – vocals

Production and recording

- Terry Date – producer
- Scott Olson – audio engineer
- Shaun Lopez – additional recording on "Smile"
