= You've Seen the Butcher =

Single by Deftones

from the album Diamond Eyes
- Released: October 28, 2010
- Length: 3:31
- Label: Reprise
- Songwriters: Stephen Carpenter; Abe Cunningham; Chino Moreno; Frank Delgado; Sergio Vega
- Producer: Nick Raskulinecz

Deftones singles chronology
"Sextape" (2010)	"You've Seen the Butcher" (2010)	"Leathers" (2012)

Music video
- "You’ve Seen the Butcher" on YouTube

"You've Seen the Butcher" is a song by the American alternative metal band Deftones. It was the fourth and final single released from their sixth studio album, Diamond Eyes (2010).

To support funding for bassist Chi Cheng, the drumset and keyboard used in filming the music video were auctioned.

== Music video ==
The music video for "You've Seen the Butcher" was directed by Jodeb Films. It shows the band playing in a worn-out library, which appears to be floating in the air, while library books rain down from the sky. Young women form a crowd around the band as they play, getting more aggressive with the band and grabbing them. When the song reaches the bridge, blood starts pouring from the ceiling of the library, spraying both the band and the women. The end of the video depicts a bloody, drenched Deftones.

The video premiered via Myspace and MTV2 on October 28, 2010, and received airplay on MTV2's AMTV.

== Track listing ==
iTunes EP
No.	Title	Length
1.	"You've Seen the Butcher"	3:31
2.	"You've Seen the Butcher (Midnight Airport Version)"	3:10
3.	"Birthmark (Live)"	4:06

== Personnel ==
Deftones

- Chino Moreno – vocals
- Stephen Carpenter – guitars
- Abe Cunningham – drums
- Frank Delgado – keyboards, samples, turntables
- Sergio Vega – bass

Production

- Nick Raskulinecz – producer
- Chris Lord-Alge – mixing
- Ted Jensen – mastering

== Charts ==
Chart (2010)	Peak position
US Mainstream Rock (Billboard)	17
US Hot Rock & Alternative Songs (Billboard)	34
