= Phantom Bride =

Single by Deftones featuring Jerry Cantrell

from the album Gore
- Released: June 7, 2016
- Genre: Alternative metal; space rock; experimental rock
- Length: 4:53
- Label: Reprise
- Composers: Stephen Carpenter; Abe Cunningham; Chino Moreno; Frank Delgado; Sergio Vega
- Lyricist: Chino Moreno
- Producers: Matt Hyde; Deftones

Deftones singles chronology
"Hearts / Wires" (2016)	"Phantom Bride" (2016)	"Ohms" (2020)

"Phantom Bride" is a song by American alternative metal band Deftones, appearing on the band's eighth studio album, Gore. The song was released as the album's fourth and final single. The song features a guitar solo performed by Jerry Cantrell from Alice in Chains.

According to vocalist Chino Moreno, guitarist Stephen Carpenter wrote the song by himself, aside from the lyrics and drums.

== Charts ==
Chart (2016)	Peak position
US Mainstream Rock (Billboard)	8
US Rock & Alternative Airplay (Billboard)	24
