= Mein (song) =

Single by Deftones featuring Serj Tankian

from the album Saturday Night Wrist
- B-side: "Cherry Waves (Acoustic Version)"
- Released: March 13, 2007
- Genre: Alternative metal; space rock
- Length: 3:57
- Label: Maverick
- Songwriters: Stephen Carpenter; Chi Cheng; Abe Cunningham; Chino Moreno; Frank Delgado; Shaun Lopez; Serj Tankian
- Producers: Bob Ezrin; Deftones

Deftones singles chronology
"Hole in the Earth" (2006)	"Mein" (2007)	"Diamond Eyes" (2010)

Music video
- "Mein" on YouTube

"Mein" (German for either "mine" or "my") is the second single from the American alternative metal band Deftones' fifth album, Saturday Night Wrist, and their 11th single overall. The song featured Serj Tankian of System of a Down on vocals. The single was released on March 13, 2007. It is also the band's last single recorded with their bassist Chi Cheng before his serious automobile crash in the following year and before his death in 2013.

== Background ==
In a later interview on Reddit, Tankian was asked how the collaboration had come about, replying: "Chino asked and I obliged :) We´ve all been friends and toured together for many years"

== Reception ==
Calling the song an "industrial banger with swooshy space-rock overlays," Rolling Stone writer Christian Hoard favorably compared Chino Moreno's vocal style to that of Thom Yorke. Conversely, NME panned "Mein," thinking it wasn't exciting enough, and song reminded him of "when we used to have MTV2 and had to switch to VH1 Classic every time Back To School came on, or we’d get a headache. Boooooring." Drowned in Sound reviewer, Ben Yates, characterized it as "average" and "forgettable", and unfavorably compared it to the rest of Saturday Night Wrist, saying it was considerably less "fast, heavy, and ambitious". Yates described Tankian guest appearance as "subdued".

"Mein" garnered little radio play and subsequently failed to chart significantly on American rock charts, peaking at number 40 on the US Mainstream Rock Tracks chart.

== Music video ==
During the week of January 20, 2007, the band filmed a music video for "Mein", which was subsequently leaked to YouTube on March 2. Directed by Bernard Gourley, the video depicted hip hop influences and breakdancers, while the band performed on top of a parking structure with the Los Angeles skyline in the background.

== Track listing ==
CD single • iTunes single
No.	Title	Lyrics	Length
1.	"Mein"	Tankian/Moreno/Lopez	3:58
2.	"Cherry Waves (Acoustic Version)"	Moreno	5:04

Promo CD single • digital single
No.	Title	Lyrics	Length
1.	"Mein"	Tankian/Moreno/Lopez	3:58
