= Prayers / Triangles =

Single by Deftones

from the album Gore
- Released: February 4, 2016
- Genre: Alternative metal; experimental rock
- Length: 3:38
- Label: Warner; Reprise
- Composers: Stephen Carpenter; Abe Cunningham; Chino Moreno; Frank Delgado; Sergio Vega
- Lyricist: Chino Moreno
- Producers: Matt Hyde; Deftones

Deftones singles chronology
"Romantic Dreams" (2013)	"Prayers / Triangles" (2016)	"Doomed User" (2016)

Music video
- "Prayers / Triangles" on YouTube

"Prayers / Triangles" is a song by American alternative metal band Deftones. It was released on February 4, 2016, as the lead single from their eighth studio album, Gore (2016).

The song was remixed by synthwave musician Com Truise and released as a single on June 24, 2016.

== Music video ==
An audio video for the song was released on February 4, 2016 and was directed by Chris Buongiorno and consists of animations of the flamingos from the Gore album cover flying.

The official music video for the song was released two months later on April 12 and was directed by Charles Bergquist. The video consists of the band performing with shots of Chino Moreno running down a street. While the video is mostly in black and white, some colors make appearances, such as orange, pink, yellow, and green. Images of triangles also appear throughout the video.

== Track listing ==
Promo single

No.	Title	Length
1.	"Prayers / Triangles"	3:38

Remix single

No.	Title	Length
1.	"Prayers / Triangles" (Com Truise Remix)	3:35

== Personnel ==
Personnel taken Sound on Sound.

- Chino Moreno – vocals, guitar
- Stephen Carpenter – guitar
- Sergio Vega – bass
- Frank Delgado – synthesizer
- Abe Cunningham – drums

== Charts ==
Chart (2016)	Peak position
UK Rock & Metal (OCC)	37
US Alternative Airplay (Billboard)	36
US Hot Rock & Alternative Songs (Billboard)	39
US Mainstream Rock (Billboard)	8
