= Hole in the Earth =

Single by Deftones

from the album Saturday Night Wrist
- Released: September 12, 2006
- Genre: Alternative metal
- Length: 4:11
- Label: Maverick
- Songwriters: Stephen Carpenter; Chi Cheng; Abe Cunningham; Frank Delgado; Chino Moreno
- Producers: Bob Ezrin; Deftones

Deftones singles chronology
"Hexagram" (2003)	"Hole in the Earth" (2006)	"Mein" (2007)

Music video
- "Hole in the Earth" on YouTube

"Hole in the Earth" is a song by the American alternative metal band Deftones. The song was released as the first single from their fifth album, Saturday Night Wrist, and appeared as the album's opening track.

== Background ==
Moreno wrote "Hole in the Earth" about his frustration with the rest of the band during the writing process of the album. He felt that the other members were bothering him over how long it was taking to finish the record, and Moreno expressed his dismay with his bandmates in the song with the lyric: "I hate all of my friends, they all lack taste".

In a 2016 interview with Spin, Moreno acknowledged that, "in their defense, they probably hated me at that time, too ... At that point, the disconnect was so strong and that record took three years to get finished and basically everybody just came in and did their part and left, including myself."

== Reception ==
"Hole in the Earth" was released to radio airplay in 2006. It charted relatively well, peaking at No. 18 and No. 19 in Billboard's Alternative Songs and Hot Mainstream Rock Tracks charts, respectively, and in 69th position in the UK Singles Chart.

== Music video ==
A music video was filmed for the single, directed by Brian Lazzaro.

== Track listing ==
UK CD1
No.	Title	Length
1.	"Hole in the Earth"	4:11
2.	"Hexagram" (Live)	4:10

UK CD2
No.	Title	Length
1.	"Hole in the Earth"	4:11
2.	"My Own Summer (Shove It)" (Live)	3:45
3.	"Hole in the Earth" (Video)

Promo CD
No.	Title	Length
1.	"Hole in the Earth"	4:11

== Personnel ==
Deftones

- Chino Moreno – vocals, rhythm guitar
- Stephen Carpenter – lead guitar
- Chi Cheng – bass
- Frank Delgado – keyboards
- Abe Cunningham – drums

Production

- Produced by Bob Ezrin
- Pro Tools Engineering by Ryan Gorman
- Mixed by Ryan Williams

== Charts ==
Chart (2006–07)	Peak positions
Scotland (OCC)	44
UK Singles (OCC)	69
US Alternative Airplay (Billboard)	18
US Mainstream Rock (Billboard)	19

== Certifications ==
Certifications for "Hole in the Earth"
Region	Certification	Certified units/sales
United States (RIAA)	Gold	500,000^{‡}
^{‡} Sales+streaming figures based on certification alone.
