= Rocket Skates =

Single by Deftones

from the album Diamond Eyes
- B-side: "Rocket Skates (M83 Remix)"
- Released: March 11, 2010
- Recorded: 2009
- Genre: Post-hardcore
- Length: 4:14
- Label: Reprise
- Songwriters: Stephen Carpenter; Abe Cunningham; Chino Moreno; Frank Delgado; Sergio Vega
- Producer: Nick Raskulinecz

Deftones singles chronology
"Diamond Eyes" (2010)	"Rocket Skates" (2010)	"Sextape" (2010)

Music video
- "Rocket Skates" on YouTube

"Rocket Skates" is a song by the American alternative metal band Deftones. It was the second single released from Deftones' sixth studio album, Diamond Eyes. It was also the first single released without bassist Chi Cheng, who was in a coma during its recording, following a car accident November 2008. The single was recorded with former Quicksand bassist Sergio Vega, who played bass on the entirety of Diamond Eyes. It was later released as a limited edition 7" vinyl single for international Record Store Day on April 17, 2010, serving as the second overall single.

== Release ==
Deftones began incorporating "Rocket Skates" into their live set list as early as October 2009. As part of a promotion for Diamond Eyes, a free download of the single was made available for 24 hours on February 23, 2010 through the band's website, accompanying new information about the album. The surge of visitors trying to download the track crashed the website's servers, resulting in temporary technical difficulties. It was later made available on digital music retail sites such as iTunes and Amazon on March 11.

As a part of international Record Store Day on April 17, 2010, 3,000 copies of "Rocket Skates" were released in a limited edition 7" vinyl format with a "picture sleeve" supporting the unofficial holiday. The vinyl edition featured a B-side remix of "Rocket Skates" by French electronic band M83. The remix was also given away as a free download to anyone who placed a pre-order for the CD version of Diamond Eyes.

A music video directed by 13thWitness was released on March 9, 2010.

== Reception ==
The song was well received by music critics, and compared to Deftones' older and heavier material. Amy Sciarretto of Noisecreep claimed the song was "heavier than granite and very Deftones circa '98", while Annie Zaleski of Riverfront Times stated, "Calling it 'heavy' doesn't do it justice".

== Track listing ==
Digital single • UK 1-track promo CD • Denmark promo CD

1. "Rocket Skates" – 4:14

Digital single - remix

1. "Rocket Skates" (M83 Remix) – 5:45

7" single

1. "Rocket Skates" – 4:14
2. "Rocket Skates" (M83 Remix) – 5:45

UK 2-tracks promo CD

1. "Rocket Skates"
2. "Diamond Eyes"

== Personnel ==
Deftones

- Stephen Carpenter – guitars
- Abe Cunningham – drums
- Frank Delgado – keyboards, samples
- Chino Moreno – vocals
- Sergio Vega – bass

Production

- Paul Figueroa – engineering
- Ted Jensen – mastering
- Nick Raskulinecz – producer, mixing

Artwork and design

- Frank Maddocks – art direction and design
- Ryan McVay (Getty Images) – original cover photo

== Charts ==
Chart (2010)	Peak position
US Hot Singles Sales (Billboard)	12
