= Hexagram (song) =

Single by Deftones

from the album Deftones
- B-side: "Lovers"
- Released: August 26, 2003
- Genre: Alternative metal
- Length: 4:09
- Label: Maverick
- Songwriters: Stephen Carpenter; Chi Cheng; Abe Cunningham; Frank Delgado; Chino Moreno
- Producers: Terry Date; Deftones

Deftones singles chronology
"Minerva" (2003)	"Hexagram" (2003)	"Hole in the Earth" (2006)

Music video
- "Hexagram" on YouTube

"Hexagram" is a song by American alternative metal band Deftones. It was the second single released from their eponymous fourth studio album. The cover art for the single is a work titled "Bandaged Love" by artist Elliott Rae.

== Music video ==
The black-and-white music video for "Hexagram" showed excited fans entering a building to watch a live performance of the song. As such, the majority of the video focused on this performance, with small exceptions like a shirtless, incapacitated Chino Moreno lying on the floor during the moody bridge. Audio for the video was taken entirely from the studio recording until the very end, which featured live crowd noise.

In contrast to the single's minimal radio play, the "Hexagram" video earned significant rotation on the more underground-oriented Headbangers Ball and Uranium in late 2003.

== Reception ==
In reviewing Deftones, Stephen Thomas Erlewine of AllMusic wrote that "Hexagram", the album's opener, "hits hard—harder than they ever have, revealing how mushy Staind is, or how toothless Linkin Park is". Betty Clarke of The Guardian negatively criticized Moreno's rough vocals on the song for its melancholic nature.

== Cover versions ==
In 2010, German metalcore band War from a Harlots Mouth recorded a cover of the song.

== Track listing ==
All tracks are written by Deftones.

No.	Title	Length
1.	"Hexagram"	4:09
2.	"Bloody Cape"	3:36
3.	"Lovers"	4:11

== Charts ==
Chart (2003)	Peak position
Scotland (OCC)	72
UK Singles (OCC)	68
UK Rock & Metal (OCC)	11
