= Ohms (song) =

Single by Deftones

from the album Ohms
- Released: August 21, 2020
- Genre: Alternative metal
- Length: 4:10
- Label: Reprise
- Composers: Chino Moreno; Stephen Carpenter; Sergio Vega; Frank Delgado; Abe Cunningham
- Lyricist: Chino Moreno
- Producers: Terry Date; Deftones

Deftones singles chronology
"Phantom Bride" (2016)	"Ohms" (2020)	"Genesis" (2020)

Music video
- "Ohms" on YouTube

"Ohms" is a song by American alternative metal band Deftones. The song was released as the lead single from the band's ninth studio album Ohms (2020). The song appears on the album as the tenth and final track. It was nominated for Best Rock Performance at the 64th Grammy Awards.

== Music video ==
Deftones released a series of cryptic teasers for a week in mid-August 2020. The teaser campaign ended on August 21, 2020 with the release of the "Ohms" music video; the album's title was also revealed with the video's release. The video was directed by Rafatoon and features the band performing interspersed with scenes of a dystopian world.

== Personnel ==
Personnel taken from Song Exploder.

- Chino Moreno – vocals
- Stephen Carpenter – guitar
- Sergio Vega – bass
- Frank Delgado – Prophet-5 synthesizer
- Abe Cunningham – drums

== Charts ==
Chart performance for "Ohms"
Chart (2020–21)	Peak position
Canada Rock (Billboard)	42
Scotland (OCC)	92
New Zealand Hot Singles (RMNZ)	19
US Hot Rock & Alternative Songs (Billboard)	31
US Rock Airplay (Billboard)	17
