= Minerva (song) =

Single by Deftones

from the album Deftones
- B-side: "Sinatra"; "Sleep Walk"
- Released: April 22, 2003
- Genre: Alternative metal; shoegaze
- Length: 4:17
- Label: Maverick
- Songwriters: Stephen Carpenter; Chi Cheng; Abe Cunningham; Chino Moreno; Frank Delgado
- Producers: Terry Date; Deftones

Deftones singles chronology
"Digital Bath" (2001)	"Minerva" (2003)	"Hexagram" (2003)

Music video
- "Minerva" on YouTube

"Minerva" is a song by American alternative metal band Deftones. It was released in 2003 as the lead single from their self-titled fourth studio album. The song charted at No. 9 on Billboard's Modern Rock Tracks chart, No. 16 on the Mainstream Rock chart and No. 15 on the UK Singles Chart.

== Musical style ==
"Minerva" has an uplifting alternative metal sound and has also been described as shoegaze.

== Music video ==
The music video for "Minerva," directed by Paul Fedor, is notable for its similarity to Pink Floyd's Live at Pompeii concert film. The band is featured playing the song in a desert-like landscape backed by various amplifiers and other stage equipment. It was filmed near the Salton Sea in southern California in 2003, during a sandstorm. The filming process itself was fraught with problems, as the sand caused problems with the recording equipment and lighting setup. The shoot eventually took 22 hours to complete, with Abe Cunningham saying that "[the shoot] sucked" and Chi Cheng calling it "terrible", but conceding that "it [is] a trippy video. I actually like it a lot".

== Reception ==
In 2016, Consequence of Sound placed "Minerva" at No. 12 in its article "The Top 20 Deftones Songs", with Jon Hadusek claiming that "[in] a way, Deftones brought shoegaze to the alternative metal mainstream with 'Minerva', a crushingly heavy, textured jam indebted to Siamese Dream-era Smashing Pumpkins and Hum [...]".

== Track listing ==
No.	Title	Writer(s)	Length
1.	"Minerva"	Deftones	4:17
2.	"Sinatra" (Helmet cover)	Page Hamilton	4:34
3.	"Sleep Walk" (Santo & Johnny cover)	Santo Farina, Johnny Farina, Ann Farina	2:30

== Appearances in other media ==
"Minerva" appeared on the soundtrack for the 2005 remake of House of Wax.

== Charts ==
Chart (2003)	Peak position
Australia (ARIA)	50
Scotland Singles (OCC)	16
UK Singles (OCC)	15
US Alternative Airplay (Billboard)	9
US Mainstream Rock (Billboard)	16
US Bubbling Under Hot 100 (Billboard)	20

== Certifications ==
Certifications for "Minerva"
Region	Certification	Certified units/sales
United States (RIAA)	Gold	500,000^{‡}
^{‡} Sales+streaming figures based on certification alone.
