= Phallucy =

American rock band

- Origin: Sacramento, California, U.S
- Genres: Alternative metal; experimental rock
- Years active: 1987–1993; 2008; 2015–present
- Labels: Blackliner Records
- Members: Sonny Mayugba; David Garcia; Josh Coker; Dominic Garcia
- Past members: Abe Cunningham

Phallucy is an American rock band from Sacramento, California. The band's drummer, Abe Cunningham, later became the drummer with the band Deftones. Phallucy has reunited three times: in 1999, 2001 and finally in 2009 for the Chi Cheng Benefit Show in San Francisco along with Death Angel and other special guests.

== History ==
Phallucy was a band from Sacramento formed in 1987. The band's name is a combination of the words "fallacy" and "phallus". Original members include Sonny Mayugba (guitar) and David Garcia (vocals).

By 1993 the band, which then featured drummer Abe Cunningham, recorded a CD titled Valium. Before the release of the CD, Cunningham left to rejoin Deftones. Mayugba went on to publish Heckler magazine. Garcia started the band Daycare.

On September 11, 2001, the band's first album, Valium, conceived eight years earlier, was finished and received a limited release. When asked why now was the right time to release the album, Cunningham replied: "Primarily just because it never even saw the light of day. Back at that point I had rejoined the Deftones, with Phallucy having broken up and I had a cassette copy of it that wasn't even finished and it sounded pretty bad, and then 6 or 7 months ago Sonny and I got back together with Dave and we just decided to see what would happen if we actually finished it and it turned out to sound pretty cool. You can tell it's very young but it is what it is."

=== 2008 reunion ===
In November 2008, Phallucy reunited for the Chi Cheng Benefit Show in San Francisco along with Death Angel (with Chuck Billy) and other special guests. The show was a benefit to raise money for Deftones bass guitarist Chi Cheng who was injured in a car crash on November 3, 2008, and went into a coma. All the money raised on the night went towards his medical bills.
