= Covers (Deftones album) =

2011 compilation album by Deftones

Compilation album of cover songs by Deftones
- Released: April 16, 2011
- Recorded: 1990–2010
- Length: 47:55
- Label: Warner Bros.

Deftones chronology
Diamond Eyes (2010)	Covers (2011)	Koi No Yokan (2012)

Covers is a compilation album by American alternative metal band Deftones. The album was released by Warner Bros. Records as a limited edition release for Record Store Day on April 16, 2011. It was distributed exclusively in a vinyl record format, limited to 5,000 copies.

As the title suggests, Covers is a compilation of cover songs—many of which were previously released on B-Sides & Rarities (2005) and the digital version of Diamond Eyes (2010). Deftones record cover songs after each album recording session, and the songs on Covers span their entire career up to that point. The cover of Lynyrd Skynyrd's "Simple Man" was recorded before the group's debut album Adrenaline (1995) when vocalist Chino Moreno was about 17 years old.

== Track listing ==
No.	Title	Writer(s)	Original artist	Length
1.	"Drive"	Ric Ocasek	The Cars	4:51
2.	"Caress"	Rick Froberg (lyrics); Drive Like Jehu (music)	Drive Like Jehu	3:34
3.	"Please, Please, Please, Let Me Get What I Want"	Johnny Marr; Morrissey	The Smiths	2:01
4.	"No Ordinary Love"	Sade Adu; Stuart Matthewman	Sade	5:34
5.	"Savory" (featuring Far)	William Barbot; Zachary Barocas; Kim Coletta; James Robbins	Jawbox	4:35
6.	"Do You Believe"	Nina Persson; Peter Svensson	The Cardigans	3:29
7.	"Simple Man"	Gary Rossington; Ronnie Van Zant	Lynyrd Skynyrd	6:19
8.	"Ghosts"	David Sylvian	Japan	4:28
9.	"The Chauffeur"	Nicholas Bates; Simon Le Bon; Andy Taylor; John Taylor; Roger Taylor	Duran Duran	5:22
10.	"If Only Tonight We Could Sleep" (Live)	Boris Williams; Simon Gallup; Robert Smith; Pearl Thompson; Lol Tolhurst	The Cure	5:07
11.	"Sleep Walk"	Ann Farina; John Farina; Santo Farina	Santo & Johnny	2:30

== Charts ==
Chart performance for Covers
Chart (2024)	Peak position
Croatian International Albums (HDU)	8
Hungarian Physical Albums (MAHASZ)	20
