= Diamond Eyes =

2010 studio album by Deftones

Studio album by Deftones
- Released: May 4, 2010
- Recorded: 2009
- Studios: The Pass (Los Angeles); Amerycan (Hollywood)
- Genres: Alternative metal; shoegaze; post-hardcore
- Length: 41:22
- Label: Reprise
- Producer: Nick Raskulinecz

Deftones chronology
Saturday Night Wrist (2006)	Diamond Eyes (2010)	Covers (2011)

Singles from Diamond Eyes
- 1. "Rocket Skates" Released: March 11, 2010; 2. "Diamond Eyes" Released: March 23, 2010; 3. "Sextape" Released: October 1, 2010; 4. "You've Seen the Butcher" Released: November 29, 2010

Diamond Eyes is the sixth studio album by the American alternative metal band Deftones. It was released on May 4, 2010, by Reprise Records. It was the first album to be produced by Nick Rasculinecz, and also the first album to feature bassist Sergio Vega, who replaced original bassist Chi Cheng. An album tentatively titled Eros was originally intended to be the band's sixth full-length release following Saturday Night Wrist (2006), but was not finished due to Cheng entering a coma after a serious car accident that occurred in November 2008, eventually resulting in his death in 2013. The band continued on with Vega as his replacement, and the release of Eros was put on hold in favor of Diamond Eyes in June 2009. Diamond Eyes was a critical and commercial success, peaking within the top ten of the US Billboard 200 and several other international charts; it was the band's highest charting album on the Billboard 200 since their eponymous fourth album, Deftones (2003).

== Background ==
Deftones started writing material for the successor to 2006's Saturday Night Wrist in early 2007. The band was dissatisfied with the lengthy writing and recording process of Saturday Night Wrist. Further, they wanted to release a quick follow-up record in the same manner as earlier albums such as 1995's Adrenaline and 1997's Around the Fur, which were recorded without the digital audio program Pro Tools. Instead, those albums were recorded as just a band "in the room with just our instruments, no other distractions", according to frontman Chino Moreno.

The band recorded and completed their studio album produced by Terry Date, tentatively titled Eros, in 2008, and it was expected to be released in early 2009. However, bassist Chi Cheng was seriously injured in an automobile accident in November 2008, leaving him in a coma and putting the release of Eros on hold. Unsure if or when Cheng would recover and be able to perform with the band again, Deftones started playing various shows and festivals with Quicksand bassist Sergio Vega on bass, starting in early 2009. Vega, a close friend of the band, had previously filled in for Cheng during tours in 1999. At this point, Deftones were not sure if they wanted to break up or continue writing and performing music.

In June 2009, Deftones decided to indefinitely put the release of Eros on hold and start writing a brand new album with Vega. The band still hopes to release Eros at some point, but wanted to wait until Cheng was no longer in a semi-conscious state, and they did not feel that it represented who they were as artists or as people at the time. Deftones wanted to make an optimistic record, as opposed to the dark and angry album they had just finished.

Deftones avoided using Pro Tools on the album. Instead, they favored writing songs together as a band and practicing them "a million times 'til they were perfect" in order to achieve a more raw and "personable" sound.

== Release ==
Diamond Eyes was originally scheduled to be released on April 27 by Reprise, but was pushed back three weeks to May 18, and later pushed forward to May 4, 2010. The latter release date change was due to the album leaking onto the Internet in March 2010, almost two months before the original scheduled release date.

The first song from the album, "Rocket Skates", was available for free download through the band's official website on February 23, 2010. The song had been included in Deftones live performances starting in October 2009, and was later released as a limited edition 7" vinyl single for international Record Store Day on April 17, 2010, serving as the second overall single. A music video directed by 13th Witness (Tim McGurr) was released on March 9.

The first single, however, was the title track, "Diamond Eyes". It was released as a single to digital retailers on March 23, 2010. The music video for the song, directed by Roboshobo (Robert Schober), was released on April 13. Deftones performed a live webcast of songs from Diamond Eyes and answered fan questions on May 4 in Dallas, Texas. A music video for the track "Sextape" was released on September 3, 2010. The video was directed by ZFCL (Zak Forrest and Chad Liebenguth, known for their work with Foxy Shazam and Fang Island). On October 28, 2010, Deftones released the official video for "You've Seen the Butcher", directed by Jodeb Films. In August 2011, Deftones released the official music video for "Beauty School", directed by 13th Witness.

At just over 41 minutes, not including the pre-order and deluxe edition bonus tracks, Diamond Eyes is Deftones' shortest album.

== Lyrics and themes ==
After dealing with the tragedy surrounding Cheng's accident, Deftones wanted to create an album with an overall positive and optimistic vibe. Describing the band's state while writing for the album, Moreno stated, "Our inspiration and unity as a band is stronger than it has ever been before and we needed to channel that energy into our music". Noticeably lacking on the album were songs about complaining, hurting or how "life sucks" — common lyrical themes for Moreno since the early '90s. Moreno described the overall theme of the album as a "positive zest for life", and also said it had "a fantasy vibe" similar to White Pony. The lyrics for "Rocket Skates" contained "beautiful yet violent imagery" and were compared to the song "Knife Prty" from White Pony. Deftones also thought it would be difficult to tour in support of a new album with memories of Cheng attached to it. Commenting on songwriting, Moreno stated:

"I don't like listening to people's problems — I like music. Music has been smothered with that complaining since the early-'90s. It gets old. Instead of going to the opposite side of the spectrum and listening to The Black Eyed Peas, which is just straight silly, I choose to listen to more instrumental music. I do very little singing about myself on this record. I love songs where I can totally take myself out of being human. I can sing about really odd things, and they don't necessarily have to pertain to me at all. It paints a picture. Those are the kind of lyrics I grew up with — like The Cure. Really visual images and no storytelling."

— Chino Moreno

== Reception ==
Professional ratings
Aggregate scores
Source	Rating
AnyDecentMusic?	7.3/10
Metacritic	78/100
Review scores
Source	Rating
AllMusic	4/5 stars
Alternative Press	4/5 stars
The A.V. Club	B
Entertainment Weekly	B
NME	8/10
Q	4/5 stars
Rolling Stone	3/5 stars
Slant	3.5/5 stars
Spin	7/10
Sputnikmusic	4.5/5 (Note: Although one staff member rated the album 5/5, the overall consensus among Sputnikmusic staff reviews is a collective score of 4.5/5.)

=== Critical reception ===
According to the review aggregator Metacritic, Diamond Eyes received "generally favorable reviews" based on a weighted average score of 78 out of 100 from 19 critic scores. Stephen Thomas Erlewine of AllMusic wrote, "Naturally, there is quite a bit of roiling darkness here -- they're Cure-loving metalheads, it's in their blood -- but there's shade and light, control of texture, with the band deepening rather than expanding." Jason Pettigrew of Alternative Press stated, "Unlike their alleged 'peers' (do they really have any?), Deftones learned years ago that a whisper can be more terrifying than a scream and power isn't always about BPMs and downstrokes per minute." He also added that Diamond Eyes "belongs in a pantheon of amazing albums born from tragedy". BBC writer Mike Diver was also impressed, and opined that the album "knocks every pretender to the band's throne into the middle of next week". He praised the band for playing to their strengths, and summarized: "Eros is reportedly their excursion into weirdness, while this is a statement of consolidation, a neatly segued set that finds Deftones playing to their well-established strengths." Guitar World hailed the album as a "return to form with [an] alt-metal masterpiece". NPR described the sound of the album as "goth-rock tinged shoegaze". BLARE Magazine's Joshua Khan observed "Deftones give birth to a refined sound that makes creations like 'Prince' and '976-Evil' enslaving." The Skinny's Mark Shukla likewise explained, "The first four tracks set a blistering pace as churning riffs transition relentlessly into fret-burning breakdowns; all the while Chino Moreno deploying his wounded croon and lacerating howl with an intensity that remains impressively undiminished." Sputnikmusic staff writer Nick Greer gave an unequivocally positive review and called the album "better than White Pony". He described the album's sound as "intense and visceral, but introspective and sensitive in ways Deftones have never been before", before finally adding, "I can honestly say it's Deftones' best album to date." Scott Gordon of The A.V. Club stated that while there are moments on the album where Deftones "sound a bit like a band on auto-pilot", many of the other tracks "stomp such limp moments with pleasingly crude riffs that claw and scrape through the verses, then release Chino Moreno's voice into glimmering, menacing choruses." Slant Magazine described the tracks "Sextape" and "Beauty School" as shoegaze.

=== Charts and sales ===
Diamond Eyes was named "Rock Album of the Year" by the iTunes Store. Kerrang! magazine also placed it as their Album of the Year. In their roundup of the 25 Best Metal Albums of 2010–2019, the music blog MetalSucks ranked Diamond Eyes as the 4th best metal album of the '10s. Revolver Magazine ranked Diamond Eyes as the best album of the Decade. In 2017, Loudwire staff elected it as the best hard rock album of 2010.

The album was expected to sell between 55,000 and 60,000 records in the U.S. during its first week, based on first-day sales, according to Hits Daily Double. The album sold above these expectations, moving 62,000 copies in the U.S. It debuted at No. 6 on the Billboard 200, making it the fourth consecutive Deftones album to debut within that chart's top 10. As of October 2012, the album had sold approximately 236,000 copies in the U.S. On July 3, 2025, the album was certified gold in the United States by the Recording Industry Association of America. The album was also certified gold in both the United Kingdom and New Zealand.

== Track listing ==
All tracks are written by Deftones (Stephen Carpenter, Abe Cunningham, Frank Delgado, Chino Moreno, Sergio Vega).

No.	Title	Length
1.	"Diamond Eyes"	3:09
2.	"Royal"	3:31
3.	"CMND/CTRL"	2:26
4.	"You've Seen the Butcher"	3:34
5.	"Beauty School"	4:50
6.	"Prince"	3:37
7.	"Rocket Skates"	4:18
8.	"Sextape"	4:02
9.	"Risk"	3:37
10.	"976-EVIL"	4:32
11.	"This Place Is Death"	3:46
Total length:		41:22

Online pre-order bonus track
No.	Title	Length
12.	"Rocket Skates" (M83 Remix)	5:45
Total length:		47:07

iTunes deluxe edition
No.	Title	Length
12.	"Do You Believe" (The Cardigans cover)	3:29
13.	"Ghosts" (Japan cover)	4:29
14.	"Caress" (Drive Like Jehu cover)	3:35
Total length:		52:55

== Personnel ==
Diamond Eyes personnel according to CD liner notes.

Deftones

- Abe Cunningham – drums
- Chino Moreno – vocals, guitars
- Frank Delgado – keyboards, samples
- Sergio Vega (Note: Despite being credited as a member in the liner notes, Vega disputes his status as a full time member of the band, claiming that he was a member of the band only under contract.) – bass
- Stephen Carpenter – guitars

Production and recording

- Nick Raskulinecz – producer, mixing (all except "Diamond Eyes")
- Paul Figueroa – recording, engineering
- Chris Lord-Alge – mixing on "Diamond Eyes"
- Keith Armstrong – assisted mixing on "Diamond Eyes"
- Nik Karpen – assisted mixing on "Diamond Eyes"
- Ted Jensen – mastering
- Brad Townsend – additional engineering
- Andrew Schubert – additional engineering

Art and design

- Frank Maddocks – creative direction and design
- John Ross – owl photos
- 13th Witness (Tim McGurr) – band photo

== Charts ==
Weekly chart performance for Diamond Eyes
Chart (2010)	Peak position
Australian Albums (ARIA)	22
Austrian Albums (Ö3 Austria)	13
Belgian Albums (Ultratop Flanders)	55
Belgian Albums (Ultratop Wallonia)	31
Danish Albums (Hitlisten)	28
Dutch Albums (Album Top 100)	55
Finnish Albums (Suomen virallinen lista)	32
French Albums (SNEP)	23
German Albums (Offizielle Top 100)	8
Greek Albums (IFPI)	10
Irish Albums (IRMA)	45
Italian Albums (FIMI)	50
Mexican Albums (Top 100 Mexico)	81
New Zealand Albums (RMNZ)	8
Norwegian Albums (VG-lista)	17
Portuguese Albums (AFP)	28
Scottish Albums (Official Charts)	29
Spanish Albums (PROMUSICAE)	53
Swedish Albums (Sverigetopplistan)	25
Swiss Albums (Schweizer Hitparade)	11
UK Albums (OCC)	26
US Billboard 200	6

== Certifications and sales ==
Certifications and sales for Diamond Eyes
Region	Certification	Certified units/sales
New Zealand (RMNZ)	Gold	7,500^{‡}
United Kingdom (BPI)	Gold	100,000^{‡}
United States (RIAA)	Gold	500,000^{‡}
^{‡} Sales+streaming figures based on certification alone.
