= Diamond Eyes (song) =

Single by Deftones

from the album Diamond Eyes
- Released: March 23, 2010
- Genre: Nu metal
- Length: 3:08
- Label: Reprise
- Songwriters: Stephen Carpenter; Abe Cunningham; Chino Moreno; Frank Delgado; Sergio Vega
- Producer: Nick Raskulinecz

Deftones singles chronology
"Mein" (2007)	"Diamond Eyes" (2010)	"Rocket Skates" (2010)

Music video
- "Diamond Eyes" on YouTube

"Diamond Eyes" is a song by American alternative metal band Deftones, and the title track of their sixth studio album, Diamond Eyes. It was the first single released from the album. It was the second single recorded without bassist Chi Cheng, due to a coma induced by an automobile accident in November 2008. Former Quicksand bassist Sergio Vega played bass on the single as well as the entire Diamond Eyes album.

== Release ==
On March 3, 2010, Deftones posted the track listing for Diamond Eyes via their official website, and also announced that the next single, the album's title track, would be released for digital download on March 23. On March 16, the first teaser trailer in a three-part sequence was posted on the website, featuring artwork for the new album and accompanied by clips from the "Diamond Eyes" single. On March 23, "Diamond Eyes" was released for digital download, and radio stations began playing the single on March 30.

In December 2010, "Diamond Eyes" was remixed by Deftones guitarist Stephen Carpenter's side project, Sol Invicto. The remix was released as a download for $0.99, with all proceeds benefiting Cheng's hospital bills.

=== Music video ===
On April 9, 2010, Deftones posted a teaser trailer of the music video for "Diamond Eyes" on their official website, and the video was released on April 13. The video was directed by Robert Schober, also known as Roboshobo.

== Reception ==
"Diamond Eyes" was very well received by fans and critics. The song was characterized as nu metal and compared to the band's Around the Fur material. The breakdown that closes the track has been described as the heaviest riff that Deftones have written.

== Track listing ==
1. "Diamond Eyes" - 3:08

== Personnel ==
Deftones

- Chino Moreno – vocals
- Stephen Carpenter – guitars
- Abe Cunningham – drums
- Frank Delgado – keyboards, samples
- Sergio Vega – bass

Production

- Nick Raskulinecz – producer

== Chart history ==
Chart (2010)	Peak position
US Alternative Airplay (Billboard)	16
US Mainstream Rock (Billboard)	10
US Hot Rock & Alternative Songs (Billboard)	14
