= Abe Cunningham =

American drummer (born 1973)

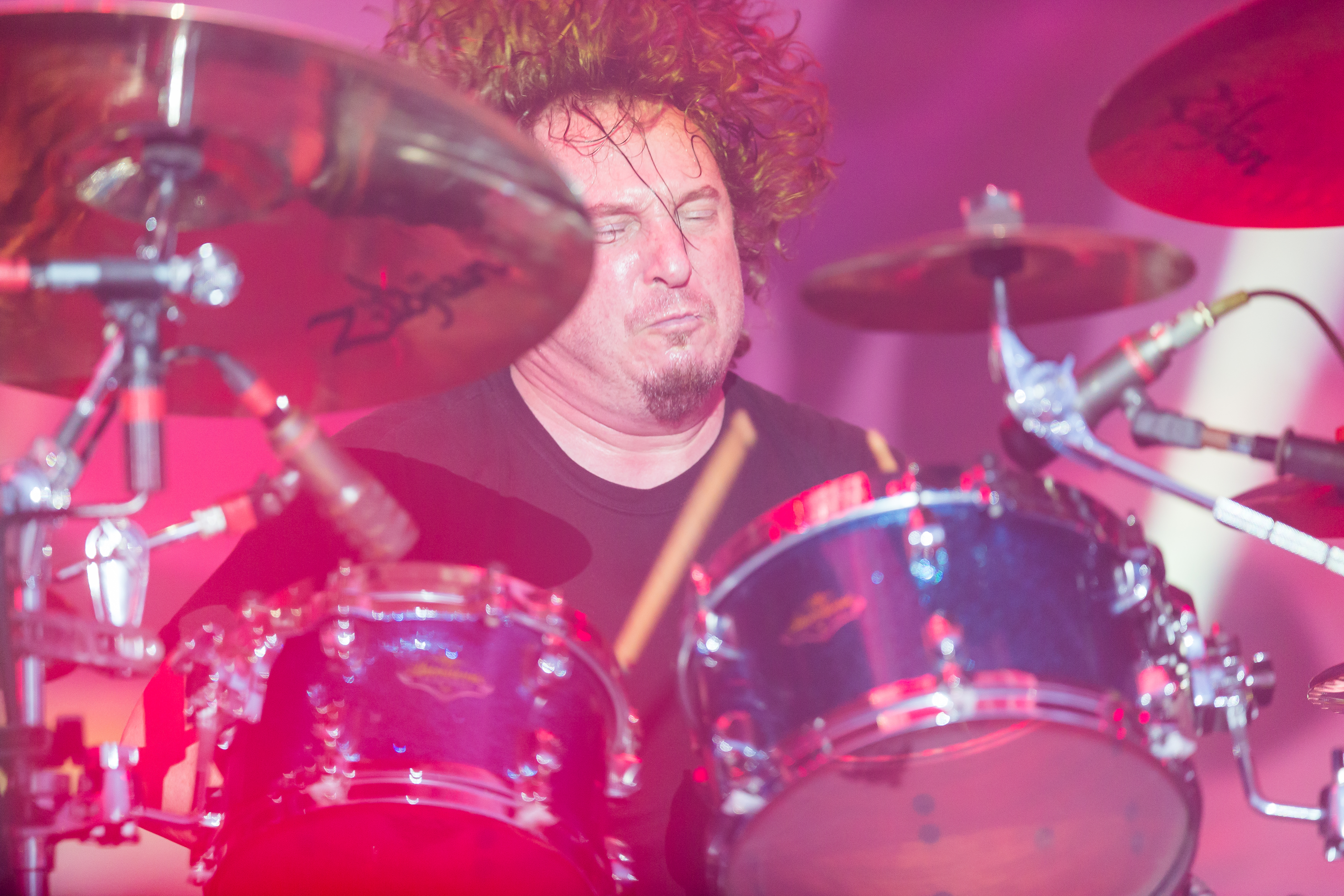
- Cunningham performing with Deftones in 2016

Background information
- Born: Abraham Benjamin Cunningham; July 27, 1973 (age 53); Long Beach, California, U.S.
- Genres: Alternative metal; nu metal; post-metal; experimental rock; alternative rock
- Occupation: Musician
- Instrument: Drums
- Years active: 1988–present
- Member of: Deftones
- Formerly of: Phallucy; Daycare; Destroy Boys

Abraham Benjamin Cunningham (born July 27, 1973) is an American musician, best known as the drummer of the alternative metal band Deftones. Cunningham is known for his frantic, pounding rhythms and clever usage of tempo. A BBC reviewer has praised his style for displaying "the assured expressiveness of a musician whose abilities stretch further than most metal-scene sticksmen".

== Career ==
He first started drumming in his early teens playing the drums for the band Phallucy in the early 1990s. During this time, he also drummed for Deftones on the side, when the band was having problems landing a permanent and dedicated drummer. At the time when he started learning drums, he also learned how to play guitar, but growing up with a stepfather (Neil) who played the drums, he took a deeper passion with the drums. Abe's father, Sid, was also a musician and an early influence for Abe before his untimely passing. His influences include Stewart Copeland, Ginger Baker and Mitch Mitchell.

Cunningham has been a long time endorser of Tama Drums and Zildjian Cymbals, and for most of his career, has played the same setup. He has been featured in various ads for Tama and Zildjian. He is an endorser of Vater drumsticks, and at the 2017 NAMM Show revealed his new signature Vater drumsticks, the model is called "Cool Breeze", which is Abe's nickname for them.

== Personal life ==
Abe Cunningham was born in Long Beach, California. When he was young, his family moved to Sacramento. Cunningham still lives in Sacramento with his family, and he has two sons, Sidney and Daniel, with his ex-wife, Annalynn Seal. He married Noelle Llorente in September 2026.

== Discography ==
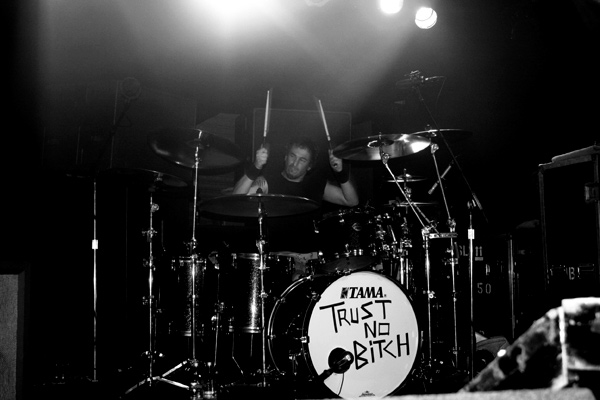
Cunningham playing the drums in 2007

=== With Deftones ===
- Adrenaline (1995)
- Around the Fur (1997)
- White Pony (2000)
- Deftones (2003)
- Saturday Night Wrist (2006)
- Diamond Eyes (2010)
- Koi No Yokan (2012)
- Gore (2016)
- Ohms (2020)
- Private Music (2025)
