= Be Quiet and Drive (Far Away) =

Single by Deftones

from the album Around the Fur
- Released: July 6, 1998
- Studio: Studio Litho (Seattle, Washington)
- Genre: Alternative metal; nu metal; shoegaze
- Length: 5:08
- Label: Maverick
- Songwriters: Stephen Carpenter; Chi Cheng; Abe Cunningham; Chino Moreno
- Producer: Terry Date

Deftones singles chronology
| "My Own Summer (Shove It)" (1997) | "Be Quiet and Drive (Far Away)" (1998) | "Change (In the House of Flies)" (2000) |

Audio sample
- file; help

Music video
- "Be Quiet and Drive (Far Away)" on YouTube

"Be Quiet and Drive (Far Away)" is a song by American alternative metal band Deftones. The song was released as the second single from the band's second studio album, Around the Fur (1997), on July 6, 1998. It was their first single to chart on the US charts, peaking at number 29 on Billboard's Mainstream Rock chart, and number 50 in the UK Singles Chart.

A music video was filmed to accompany the single's release, directed by Frank W. Ockenfels III.

== Composition ==
"Be Quiet and Drive (Far Away)" has been described as an alternative metal, nu metal and shoegaze song. Brendan Appleton of Kerrang! Radio remarked that "Some would question if it is truly nu metal," adding that the song leans toward a dreamy alternative rock feel and was reportedly influenced by Depeche Mode's "Never Let Me Down Again". According to Bob Gulla of Wall of Sound, the song "sounds more like snippets from the erstwhile shoe-gazer pop movement than the hyper metallurgy of the rest of the record." Similarly, Jeff Terich of Treble described the song as embracing pop, claiming that it is "more shoegaze or Siamese Dream-pop than metal." A staff writer of Punknews.org highlighted the track as the clearest example of Deftones' growth from their debut studio album, Adrenaline (1995), noting that by Around the Fur their music had become more textured, the performances tighter, and the band more confident overall.

"Be Quiet and Drive (Far Away)" opens with a guitar line reminiscent of Deftones' nu metal contemporaries, but develops into a more melancholic and textured composition. Sam Law of Kerrang! noted that the frontman Chino Moreno's vocal delivery, marked by what he called a purposeful androgyny, contrasted with the more aggressive style common in the scene. Loudwire's Amy Sciarretto similarly described the track as both "maudlin but pretty", and highlighted it as one of the earliest examples of Moreno's androgynous singing style, as well as a clear instance of the band's use of quiet-loud dynamics. Writing for Consequence, Dan Bogosian emphasized the sense of emotional release, writing that the track conveys the theme of escape most strongly when the band shifts into heavier passages and Moreno sings at full volume.

== Release ==
"Be Quiet and Drive (Far Away)" was released on July 6, 1998, by Maverick Records, as the second single from the band's second studio album, Around the Fur (1997). It marked their first charting single in the US, reaching number 29 on Billboard's Mainstream Rock chart. The song peaked at number 50 on the UK singles chart and number 54 on the Scottish Singles Chart in 1998. In 2026, the song was certified gold by the British Phonographic Industry (BPI), for sales of over 400,000 copies in the United Kingdom. In 2025, the song was certified 2× Platinum by the Recording Industry Association of America (RIAA), for sales of over 2,000,000 in the United States.

== Legacy ==
"Be Quiet and Drive (Far Away)" has consistently appeared in critical rankings of Deftones' best songs, with writers emphasizing both its impact on the band and its continued recognition. Sciarretto ranked it as the band's second-best song, noting that it marked a turning point in showing Deftones' ability to craft a commercially viable song. Despite its radio-friendly accessibility, she emphasized that "the song still had balls the size of apples". Law placed the song at third in his list, saying it "felt like a rallying cry for a band and fanbase ready to step away". He suggested the song pointed toward the artistic growth that would be realized on White Pony and showed Deftones’ potential for broader success. Ian Cohen of Uproxx went further, ranking it as the band's greatest song. He posed the question: "Where are Deftones in 2020 without 'Be Quiet And Drive (Far Away)'?" and suggested that if another track had been chosen as Around the Fur's second single, Deftones might have continued only as a "respected cult act that never escaped the shadow of Korn". Cohen wrote that Maverick Records might have been "even less supportive, unaware that an audience exists for Deftones' more melodic and sensitive side". He concluded: "this is the song that had to top this list — it's the reason we can make one in the first place".

== Track listing ==
All tracks written by Deftones.

=== UK CD1 ===
1. "Be Quiet and Drive (Far Away)" – 5:08
2. "Engine No. 9" (live) – 3:49
3. "Teething" (live) – 3:34

=== UK CD2 ===
1. "Be Quiet and Drive (Far Away)" – 5:10
2. "Be Quiet and Drive (Far Away) (remix)" [acoustic] – 4:33
3. "Birthmark (live)" – 3:58
- All live tracks recorded live at the Melkweg, Amsterdam on October 13, 1997.

== Personnel ==
Credits from the liner notes of Around the Fur.

- Chino Moreno – vocals
- Stephen Carpenter – guitar
- Chi Cheng – bass
- Abe Cunningham – drums

== Charts ==
Chart performance for "Be Quiet and Drive (Far Away)"
| Chart (1998) | Peak position |
|---|---|
| Scotland Singles (OCC) | 54 |
| UK Singles (OCC) | 50 |
| US Mainstream Rock (Billboard) | 29 |

== Certifications ==
Certifications and sales for "Be Quiet and Drive (Far Away)"
| Region | Certification | Certified units/sales |
|---|---|---|
| New Zealand (RMNZ) | Gold | 15,000^{‡} |
| United Kingdom (BPI) | Gold | 400,000^{‡} |
| United States (RIAA) | 2× Platinum | 2,000,000^{‡} |
^{‡} Sales+streaming figures based on certification alone.
