= Live at the Fillmore (Dredg album) =

Live album by Dredg
- Released: November 6, 2006
- Venue: The Fillmore, San Francisco, California, May 11, 2006
- Genre: Alternative rock progressive rock experimental rock art rock
- Length: 76:55
- Label: Interscope

Dredg chronology
Catch Without Arms (2005)	Live at the Fillmore (2006)	The Pariah, the Parrot, the Delusion (2009)

Professional ratings
Review scores
Source	Rating
AllMusic	link
AbsolutePunk.net	(79%) link
Decoy Music	link
Sputnikmusic	link

Live at the Fillmore is the first live album by the American progressive/experimental rock band Dredg, released in 2006. The live album contains songs from Dredg's three studio albums, Leitmotif, El Cielo, and Catch Without Arms, as well as the song "Stone by Stone", a b-side from Catch Without Arms. Chi Cheng was a special guest and played with the band. A remix version of the track "Sang Real" is available digitally only.

== Track listing ==
All tracks are written by Dredg.

No.	Title	Length
1.	"The Warbler"	2:16
2.	"Bug Eyes"	4:53
3.	"Ode to the Sun"	3:38
4.	"Same ol' Road"	4:56
5.	"Sanzen"	4:28
6.	"New Heart Shadow"	1:39
7.	"Triangle"	5:27
8.	"The Tanbark Is Hot Lava"	3:38
9.	"Not That Simple"	5:03
10.	"Whoa Is Me"	5:28
11.	"Walk in the Park"	1:46
12.	"Of the Room"	4:05
13.	"Stone by Stone"	4:27
14.	"Catch Without Arms"	4:20
15.	"Sang Real"	4:14
16.	"The Ornament"	3:04
17.	"The Canyon Behind Her"	7:12
18.	"Yatahaze"	4:07
19.	"90 Hour Sleep"	2:14
20.	"Sang Real (Remix) (track available only in digital format)"	4:41
