= Seven words =

Seven words may refer to:

- Seven Words (album), a 2022 album by British band Xentrix
- "7 Words", a song by the alternative metal band Deftones from their 1995 album Adrenaline
- The seven sayings of Jesus on the cross
  - Musical settings of sayings of Jesus on the cross
- The seven dirty words listed by the comedian George Carlin
- Jakarta Charter, also known as the "Seven Words"
