= My Own Summer (Shove It) =

Single by Deftones

from the album Around the Fur
- Released: November 1997
- Studio: Studio Litho (Seattle, Washington)
- Genre: Nu metal; alternative metal
- Length: 3:35
- Label: Maverick
- Songwriters: Stephen Carpenter; Chi Cheng; Abe Cunningham; Chino Moreno
- Producer: Terry Date

Deftones singles chronology
"Bored" (1996)	"My Own Summer (Shove It)" (1997)	"Be Quiet and Drive (Far Away)" (1998)

Music video
- "My Own Summer (Shove It)" on YouTube

"My Own Summer (Shove It)" is a song by the American alternative metal band Deftones. It was released in November 1997 as the first single from their second studio album, Around the Fur (1997).

== Composition ==
"My Own Summer (Shove It)" is a nu metal (Note: Attributed to multiple references:) and alternative metal song, which has been noted for its emphasis on tension and dynamic contrast. Amy Sciarretto of Loudwire described Deftones' approach as "exercises in tension building", and identified the track as a key example of that style. A writer for Rolling Stone similarly referred to the song as a "master class in tension building". Stephen Hill in Metal Hammer stated that "On 'My Own Summer (Shove It)', they stretched their musical dynamics to breaking point." Kerrang! writer Sam Law pointed to the track's "quiet/loud dynamism", suggesting a stylistic link to bands like

"My Own Summer (Shove It)"
A 29-second sample of "My Own Summer (Shove It)", showcasing the songs ethereal verses and anthemic chorus. Moreno "delivers both shushed-but-dread-inducing moans and a fully-enraged vocal meltdown".

Chino Moreno's vocal performance on "My Own Summer (Shove It)" features shifts between restrained and intense delivery, moving from whispered lines layered with distortion to sudden, forceful outbursts. The lyrics have been noted for their complexity and are considered an integral part of the song's dynamic character. Stephen Carpenter's guitar work on "My Own Summer (Shove It)" is a defining feature of the track, driven by a central riff that has been described as dark, intense, and progressively more forceful. It has also been characterized as "lascivious" and "rolling", with a vivid, electric quality. Abe Cunningham's drumming on "My Own Summer (Shove It)" has been noted for its precision. According to Stuart Williams of MusicRadar, the song begins with a simple tom-to-snare fill. The drum sound is described as "bone-dry", featuring a popping snare and a distinct 10-inch tom. Cunningham's main beat is minimal but requires careful control and timing to maintain the groove. His performance is both kick and snare-focused, with hi-hats that cut through the mix sharply. During the choruses, his fills are placed strategically, enhancing the rhythm without disrupting the overall flow of the song.

== Release ==
"My Own Summer (Shove It)" was released in the US in November 1997 by Maverick Records as the first single from the band's second studio album, Around the Fur (1997). The song was released in the UK on March 16, 1998. It marked their first charting single, reaching No. 29 on the UK singles chart and No. 33 on the Scottish Singles Chart in 1998. In 2023, the song was certified silver by the British Phonographic Industry (BPI). In 2025, the song was certified 2× Platinum by the Recording Industry Association of America (RIAA).

== Music video ==
The music video for "My Own Summer (Shove It)" was directed by Dean Karr and filmed at Lake Piru, Los Angeles. The video features the band performing on shark cages in the lake, using mechanical sharks on set alongside footage of real sharks. The bassist Chi Cheng recalled falling off one of the cages during filming, leaving his dreadlocks with a strong odor for a week. To supplement the video, Karr later traveled to Australia to capture real sharks on film, but after spending a week and a half there without results, he was given an extra trip. The music video began receiving regular to moderate rotation on MTV by December 1997.

== Reception and legacy ==
"My Own Summer (Shove It)" has received consistent retrospective acclaim and is frequently cited as one of Deftones' most significant songs. (Note: Attributed to multiple references:) Sam Law of Kerrang! ranked it as the band's best song, describing it as their most effective and impactful statement, even if less complex than later material. Consequence's Jon Hadusek stated that the song "create[d] the intoxicating combination that would become the template for their sound going forward: heavy, sexy, poetic". It also appeared in other retrospective rankings, including fourth by Ian Cohen of Uproxx and seventh by Amy Sciarretto of Loudwire. "My Own Summer (Shove It)" has also become a staple of Deftones' live performances and is one of their most frequently played songs in concert. Gregory Adams of Revolver named it the fifth-best Deftones song to experience live and described the track's opening snare hit as a "Pavlovian trigger to multiple generations of metalheads", noting that it "absolutely crushes every damn time." Law wrote that the energy and anticipation surrounding the song's performance continues to resonate with audiences, calling it a "pulse-quickening, crowd-surging" moment.

"My Own Summer (Shove It)" has been cited as one of the best nu metal songs. Hadusek noted that it "sounded like nothing else at the time," distinguishing itself within the nu metal landscape. Rolling Stone included it at No. 80 on its list of "the 100 Greatest Heavy Metal Songs of All Time," stating that the song would "come to define the sound of nu metal for decades to come". Annie Zaleski of Spin ranked it the third-best nu metal song, calling it a standout from Deftones' early work that contributed to an "indelible body of work". The track was also ranked in other top nu metal songs lists, including fifth by Mike Diver of Clash and 35th by Stephen Hill of Metal Hammer.

In 2021, Eli Enis of Revolver included the song on his list of the "15 Greatest Album-Opening Songs in Metal".

A version of the song was featured on the soundtrack of The Matrix. In 2023, the song was featured in episode 4 of The Idol.

== Track listing ==
All lyrics are written by Chino Moreno, except "My Own Summer (Shove It)" and "Lotion", by Chino Moreno and Deftones; all music is composed by Deftones.

Disc one
No.	Title	Length
1.	"My Own Summer (Shove It)"	3:35
2.	"Lotion" (Live)	3:54
3.	"Fireal — Swords" (Live)	6:23
4.	"Bored" (Live)	5:17

Disc two
No.	Title	Length
1.	"My Own Summer (Shove It)"	3:35
2.	"Root" (Live)	4:36
3.	"Nosebleed" (Live)	4:23
4.	"Lifter" (Live)	4:49

Notes

- The live tracks on both CDs were recorded at the Melkweg in Amsterdam on October 13, 1997.

== Personnel ==
Credits from the liner notes of Around the Fur.

Deftones

- Chino Moreno – vocals
- Stephen Carpenter – guitar
- Chi Cheng – bass
- Abe Cunningham – drums

Additional personnel

- Frank Delgado – audio effects

== Charts ==
Chart performance for "My Own Summer (Shove It)"
Chart (1998)	Peak position
Scottish Singles Sales (Official Charts)	33
UK Singles (Official Charts)	29

== Certifications ==
Certifications for "My Own Summer (Shove It)"
Region	Certification	Certified units/sales
New Zealand (RMNZ)	Platinum	30,000^{‡}
United Kingdom (BPI)	Gold	400,000^{‡}
United States (RIAA)	2× Platinum	2,000,000^{‡}
^{‡} Sales+streaming figures based on certification alone.
