= The Bamboo Parachute =

Studio album by Chi Cheng
- Released: September 2000
- Genre: Spoken word
- Length: 28:15
- Label: Chi Dai Cheng, Maverick Records
- Producer: Chi Cheng

Chi Cheng chronology
The Bamboo Parachute (2000)	The Headup Project (2021)

Professional ratings
Review scores
Source	Rating
Allmusic	3/5 stars

The Bamboo Parachute is the debut solo spoken word album by former Deftones bassist Chi Cheng. It is his only solo album to be released during his life.

The album was available directly from Deftones’ official website and could also be purchased at shows on their 2000 tour promoting White Pony.

== Track listing ==
No.	Title	Length
1.	"The Man Who Made October"	1:18
2.	"The Receiving Line"	0:42
3.	"Goin' South"	0:43
4.	"Bitter Angels"	0:42
5.	"Beautiful Life That Is Jodie"	0:09
6.	"Witness"	0:39
7.	"Whiter Than God"	0:30
8.	"It Would Be Good..."	0:39
9.	"Don Pablos"	0:51
10.	"What Kind of Person Could Do That?"	1:52
11.	"The Inside of My Pocket Knife"	1:52
12.	"The Small Black Box"	0:40
13.	"The Host Animal"	1:16
14.	"My Life on a Swing"	1:08
15.	"On Your Ear"	1:45
16.	"Something's Better Left Unsaid"	1:04
17.	"The Light Blue Afterthought"	1:10
18.	"Blow the Whistle"	1:21
19.	"You Make a Good Robot"	0:31
20.	"Manzanita (for Gary Snider)"	0:55
21.	"Do You Have Enough Stones?"	0:44
22.	"Sometimes Long Lines Work"	0:35
23.	"The Halatosis Poets"	0:43
24.	"Braces"	0:39
25.	"The Protein of an Ant Colony"	5:47
Total length:		28:15
