= List of number-one singles of 2001 (Portugal) =

The Portuguese Singles Chart ranks the best-performing singles in Portugal, as compiled by the Associação Fonográfica Portuguesa.

Week	Song	Artist	Reference
01/06/2001	"Encontrei"	Marco	
01/13/2001	"Encontrei"	Marco	
01/20/2001	"Lady (Hear Me Tonight)"	Modjo	
01/27/2001	"My Generation"	Limp Bizkit	
02/03/2001	"One More Time"	Daft Punk	
02/10/2001	"Touch Me"	Rui da Silva	
02/17/2001	"Touch Me"	Rui da Silva	
02/24/2001	"Touch Me"	Rui da Silva	
03/03/2001	"Touch Me"	Rui da Silva	
03/10/2001	"Touch Me"	Rui da Silva	
03/17/2001	"Touch Me"	Rui da Silva	
03/24/2001	"One More Time"	Daft Punk	
03/31/2001	"Touch Me"	Rui da Silva	
04/07/2001	"One More Time"	Daft Punk	
04/14/2001	"Touch Me"	Rui da Silva	
04/21/2001	"Back to School (Mini Maggit)"	Deftones	
04/28/2001	"Back to School (Mini Maggit)"	Deftones	
05/05/2001	"Touch Me"	Rui da Silva	
05/12/2001	"Touch Me"	Rui da Silva	
05/19/2001	"Touch Me"	Rui da Silva	
05/26/2001	"Touch Me"	Rui da Silva	
06/02/2001	"Back to School (Mini Maggit)"	Deftones	
06/09/2001	"Touch Me"	Rui da Silva	
06/16/2001	"Pyramid Song"	Radiohead	
06/23/2001	"I'm Like a Bird"	Nelly Furtado	
06/30/2001	"Thank You"	Dido	
07/07/2001	"Thank You"	Dido	
07/14/2001	"I'm Like a Bird"	Nelly Furtado	
07/21/2001	"Thank You"	Dido	
07/28/2001	"Elevation"	U2	
08/04/2001	"Elevation"	U2	
08/11/2001	"Elevation"	U2	
08/18/2001	"Lady Marmalade"	Christina Aguilera, Lil' Kim, Mýa and Pink	
08/25/2001	"Lady Marmalade"	Christina Aguilera, Lil' Kim, Mýa and Pink	
09/01/2001	"Lady Marmalade"	Christina Aguilera, Lil' Kim, Mýa and Pink	
09/08/2001	"Lady Marmalade"	Christina Aguilera, Lil' Kim, Mýa and Pink	
09/15/2001	"Angel"	Shaggy featuring Rayvon	
09/22/2001	"Lady Marmalade"	Christina Aguilera, Lil' Kim, Mýa and Pink	
09/29/2001	"Lady Marmalade"	Christina Aguilera, Lil' Kim, Mýa and Pink	
10/06/2001	"There You'll Be"	Faith Hill	
10/13/2001	"Lady Marmalade"	Christina Aguilera, Lil' Kim, Mýa and Pink	
10/20/2001	Elevation	U2	
10/27/2001	"You Rock My World"	Michael Jackson	
11/03/2001	"You Rock My World"	Michael Jackson	
11/10/2001	"Hero" / "Héroe"	Enrique Iglesias	
11/17/2001	"Hero" / "Héroe"	Enrique Iglesias	
11/24/2001	"Turn Off the Light"	Nelly Furtado	
12/1/2001	"Bohemian Like You"	The Dandy Warhols	
12/8/2001	"Can't Get You Out of My Head"	Kylie Minogue	
12/15/2001	"Can't Get You Out of My Head"	Kylie Minogue	
12/22/2001	"Can't Get You Out of My Head"	Kylie Minogue	
12/29/2001	"Can't Get You Out of My Head"	Kylie Minogue	
