= Bored (Deftones song) =

Promotional single by Deftones

from the album Adrenaline
- Released: May 1996
- Studio: Bad Animals (Seattle, Washington)
- Genre: Nu metal
- Length: 4:06
- Label: Maverick
- Composers: Stephen Carpenter; Chi Cheng; Abe Cunningham; Chino Moreno
- Lyricist: Chino Moreno
- Producers: Terry Date; Deftones

Deftones singles chronology
"7 Words" (1995)	"Bored" (1996)	"My Own Summer (Shove It)" (1997)

Music video
- "Bored" on YouTube

"Bored" is a song by the American alternative metal band Deftones. It was released in May 1996 as the second promotional single from their debut studio album, Adrenaline (1995). The track is representative of the band's early sound, featuring heavy guitar riffs, intense vocals, and raw production. A music video for the song was filmed in Sacramento, capturing locations tied to the band's origins. Upon release, "Bored" received mixed critical reception, though it has since been viewed more favorably in retrospective assessments, with some critics citing it as one of the band's best songs.

== Composition ==
"Bored" is characteristic of Deftones' harsh and "thrashier" sound on their debut studio album, Adrenaline (1995). The song captures the band in its formative stage, with Chino Moreno's intense vocal delivery, Stephen Carpenter's heavy metal riffing, Chi Cheng's seductive bass lines, and Abe Cunningham's dynamic drumming. Despite this composition, a writer for Billboard stated that "they add little or no energy to a song whose title may well refer to the act's apparent lack of enthusiasm for the track".

== Release ==
"Bored" was released in May 1996 as the second promotional single from their debut studio album, Adrenaline. Reflecting on the release, Moreno recalled early disagreements with Maverick Records' A&R representative over song titles. Moreno preferred more unconventional names that didn't necessarily reflect the lyrics, and initially resisted naming the track "Bored" despite the repeated lyric "I get bored" in the chorus. He cited Radiohead's "Paranoid Android" as an example of a title that doesn't appear in the song but still draws interest. Ultimately, the label's argument, that using recognizable lyrics as titles helps with radio play and listener recognition, was accepted.

=== Music video ===
Directed by Nick Egan, the music video for "Bored" was filmed in Sacramento in 1996. It features locations significant to the band's early years, including Moreno's house and Matt Erich's downtown rehearsal studio, where the band practiced extensively after moving on from Carpenter's mother's garage. According to Cunningham, the band had just returned from touring and felt happy to be back home. Cheng recalled the shoot as a laid-back gathering with family and friends at the studio, although he noted feeling drowsy during filming due to taking Benadryl for his allergies.

== Reception and legacy ==
"Bored" received mixed reception upon release, with a Billboard critic dismissing the song as "an unimpressive mishmash of '80 hard rock". Retrospective reviews have been more positive, with some considering it among Deftones' best songs. Kerrang! writer Sam Law ranked it as the band's 12th-best track and described it as a standout on Adrenaline. He highlighted the band's confident sound and noted that the song's impact placed Deftones alongside other rising California bands of the era, such as Korn. Ian Cohen of Uproxx was less favorable, despite ranking it as their 21st-best song. He described "Bored" as initially viewed as "state-of-the-art genre-blending" in 1995, but noted that, in light of the band's later work, its impact can be "hard to remember". In contrast, Hadusek argued that "Bored" set the trajectory for the rest of Deftones' career and ranked it their tenth-best song.

== Personnel ==
Credits are adapted from Hadusek and Adrenaline's liner notes.

Deftones

- Chino Moreno – vocals
- Stephen Carpenter – guitar
- Chi Cheng – bass
- Abe Cunningham – drums

Technical

- Deftones – producer
- Terry Date – producer, engineer, mixing
- Ulrich Wild – assistant engineer
- Tom Smurdy – 2nd assistant
- Ted Jensen – mastering
