= Live from the Henry Fonda Theater =

Video by Dredg
- Released: 2005
- Recorded: June 24, 2005
- Genre: Alternative rock
- Label: Interscope Records

Dredg chronology
Crickets (2003)	Live from the Henry Fonda Theater (2005)

Live from the Henry Fonda Theater was a live concert of the band Dredg, released on DVD as a promotional tool for their third album, Catch Without Arms. The DVD was recorded live on June 24, 2005 at the Henry Fonda Theater in Los Angeles, California. It consists of the band playing several songs from the album, mixed with parts of an interview with the band and promos for the album.

== Track listing ==
1. Intro/Ode to the Sun
2. Interview
3. Catch Without Arms
4. Interview
5. Advertisement for New Album Catch Without Arms
6. Interview Introduction to Sang Real
7. Sang Real
8. Interview
9. The Tanbark Is Hot Lava
10. Interview
11. Advertisement for New Album Catch Without Arms
12. Interview Introduction to Bug Eyes
13. Bug Eyes
14. Interview
15. Bug Eyes Video
16. Interview
