= Change (In the House of Flies) =

Single by Deftones

from the album White Pony
- B-side: "Crenshaw"; "No Ordinary Love"
- Released: May 16, 2000
- Genre: Alternative metal; alternative rock; nu metal; shoegaze; art rock
- Length: 4:59 (full version); 3:56 (radio edit and music video)
- Label: Maverick
- Songwriters: Stephen Carpenter; Chi Cheng; Abe Cunningham; Chino Moreno
- Producer: Terry Date

Deftones singles chronology
"Be Quiet and Drive (Far Away)" (1998)	"Change (In the House of Flies)" (2000)	"Back to School (Mini Maggit)" (2000)

Music video
- "Change (In the House of Flies)" on YouTube

"Change (In the House of Flies)" often referred to as "Change", is a song by the American alternative metal band Deftones, released on May 16, 2000, by Maverick Records as the first single from their third studio album, White Pony (2000). Written collaboratively by the band, the song originated from an unstructured session and features contributions from all members. The recording marked a shift in the band's dynamic, with the lead vocalist Chino Moreno contributing guitar parts alongside the guitarist Stephen Carpenter.

"Change" has been described as alternative metal, alternative rock, nu metal, shoegaze, and art rock. It features a slow-building arrangement, ambient samples, and abstract lyrics, and has been interpreted by critics as addressing themes such as transformation, emotional disintegration, or voyeurism. The song became the band's most commercially successful single in the United States, peaking at number three on Billboard's Alternative Airplay chart and number nine on the Mainstream Rock chart.

Critics have widely praised "Change", with several outlets ranking it among the best songs in Deftones' discography. The music video, directed by Liz Friedlander, depicts the band performing at a party with a disaffected tone.

== Background and recording ==
"Change (In the House of Flies)" was written collaboratively by Deftones during the sessions for their third album, White Pony (2000). According to the lead vocalist Chino Moreno, the song began with him and Stephen Carpenter playing guitar, while Frank Delgado contributed keyboard parts. The rest of the band joined in organically, with no instructions or direction, resulting in what Moreno described as a moment when everything started to come together. The drummer Abe Cunningham recalled hearing the track take shape in its early form as Moreno began improvising vocal lines. The band was in the control room, and Cunningham described the experience as a moment when they realized they were "on to something". Moreno's approach to the vocals involved repeatedly listening to the track and "mush-mouthing", a technique he used to uncover lyrical ideas.

Delgado, who had recently become an official member of the band after touring and contributing to Around the Fur (1997), played a significant role in shaping the atmospheric sound of "Change". Without access to a synthesizer, Delgado manipulated samples using guitar pedals provided by Carpenter and altered pitch on a turntable to create melodic elements that sounded like synth lines. The track also reflected changes in the band's dynamic, particularly with Moreno's growing role as a guitarist. Moreno recalled that Carpenter initially had reservations about this shift, but ultimately encouraged him to play on the record. Although there was some tension, Moreno said they were both pleased with the results for "Change", particularly the interplay between their guitars and the way the producer Terry Date captured the sound. The bassist Chi Cheng recalled some friction during the writing process as well. He said Carpenter and Date initially questioned his choice to play a dub-reggae-inspired bassline on the track, but he insisted on it. The song eventually became a major success for the band, which Cheng saw as a validation of his approach.

== Composition ==
Musically, "Change (In the House of Flies)" has been described as an alternative metal, alternative rock, nu metal, shoegaze, and art rock song. It opens with a mournful guitar riff, layered with eerie ambient noises and breathy vocals. The arrangement builds gradually, creating a moody and atmospheric soundscape that eventually erupts into a climactic chorus described as both intense and radiant. Cheng's creeping bassline underpins the track, accompanied by what Chris DeVille of Stereogum describes as "celestial sighs worthy of the Cocteau Twins". Amy Sciarretto in Loudwire noted the presence of a "neo nu wave mood" throughout the track, and emphasized that the song maintains a sense of heaviness despite Moreno's restrained, non-screaming vocal delivery. According to Sam Law of Kerrang!, the song presents a widescreen soundscape for Moreno's abstract lyrics, which imagine the metamorphosis of a person into a fly, lyrics the band has suggested may metaphorically reflect the aftermath of a traumatic breakup. Uproxx's Ian Cohen characterized the song as "very sinister", pointing to its themes of unnerving voyeurism and witnessing moral and physical decline while also participating in it. Writing for The A.V. Club, Ashley Naftule highlighted the disorienting qualities introduced by Delgado's electronics, which contribute to a dreamlike and unstable atmosphere.

== Release ==
"Change (In the House of Flies)" was released on May 16, 2000, by Maverick Records as the first single from Deftones' third album, White Pony. While the label initially favored a more aggressive, rap rock-oriented single, the band advocated for "Change" to lead the album's promotion. Moreno recalled a disagreement with Maverick's Guy Oseary over the choice, saying he believed "Change" was the best song on the album, even if it wasn't the most intense. Ultimately, the band's preference prevailed, and the label substituted this with a second single off White Pony, "Back to School (Mini Maggit)".

"Change" received a strong initial response from both radio stations and listeners. Within a week of its release, it became the most-added song at active rock and alternative radio, with more than 60 stations picking it up. Some modern rock outlets reportedly began playing the track after downloading it from Napster, aiming to be first on the air. The song went on to become Deftones' most commercially successful single, peaking at number three on Billboard's Alternative Airplay chart and number nine on the Mainstream Rock chart. Although it did not enter the Billboard Hot 100, it reached number five on the Bubbling Under Hot 100 chart. Internationally, it peaked at number 53 on the UK Singles Chart and number 54 in Scotland. In 2025, the British Phonographic Industry (BPI) certified the song gold for over 400,000 sales in the United Kingdom. In 2025, the song was certified 4× Platinum by the Recording Industry Association of America (RIAA) for sales of over 4,000,000 in the United States.

== Critical reception ==
"Change (In the House of Flies)" has been widely acclaimed by critics and is often cited among the best songs in Deftones' discography. Jon Hadusek of Consequence ranked it as the band's greatest track, calling it a "modern classic" and "one of the greatest alternative rock songs of all time". He described it as a "pure and perfect distillation" of what makes the band captivating and concluded that "If we could only take one Deftones song — only one — with us for the rest of our lives, let it be 'Change'". Sam Law in Kerrang! placed the song second on his list of top Deftones tracks, stating that it redefined the band's identity at the start of the 2000s and marked their transition from "nu-metal outsiders to alt.metal messiahs". Loudwire's Amy Sciarretto also ranked it as the band's best song, noting that it "proudly displayed new elements of the band's musical personality", which resonated strongly with fans. Ian Cohen of Uproxx ranked the song third on the outlet's list of greatest Deftones songs.

== Music video ==
Moreno appearing in the music video for "Change (In the House of Flies)".

The music video for "Change (In the House of Flies)" was directed by Liz Friedlander. According to Delgado, the concept was "a never-ending party, going on for three days or so – a wild, exotic, indulgent party". The idea originated with Moreno and Cheng, who developed it after rejecting various proposals they felt were unsuitable. Moreno described the submitted treatments as either "over-artsy" or "just straight-up silly", citing examples such as the band performing alongside skateboarders. He stated, "Everything was either too complicated or too easy." In response, he and Cheng created their own treatment, which was then sent to the director Nigel Dick. Moreno said he wanted to include performance in the video, but not in a typical setting with fans or in stylized locations, such as "a desert dressed in Gucci clothing trying to look weird." He suggested filming at his own house to reflect a more genuine version of the band. Cohen noted that "Change" would not have been well served by a video of the band simply performing in an interesting-looking studio, as the song is "too slow, too tense" for that kind of treatment. While Dick did not end up directing the video, the project was ultimately helmed by Friedlander.

The video was filmed on May 30 and 31, 2000, at a rented mansion in the Hollywood Hills, rather than at Moreno's home as originally planned. It depicts Deftones performing at a party while not being the central focus. The video opens with a shot of a rundown room, with single-use plastic forks visible. Moreno then appears and begins to sing. When the camera zooms in on him, he is alone, but in the next shot, he is surrounded by people. Many of the people in the video appear joyless and fatigued. A model featured in the video described the premise as resembling a group that had been "up on drugs for three days". Cohen added that "They blend in with their surroundings, but don't quite belong, as none of the band members seem to be acknowledged by anyone they're playing for." Friedlander occasionally cuts away to scenes of the band performing alone in a living room. The video concludes as it began: with Moreno alone and the house still in disarray. Writing for Kerrang!, Mike Rampton noted that aside from some static effects and the use of single-use plastic, the video remains "impressively un-dated", observing that the fashion and tone still feel contemporary despite the time that has passed since its release.

== Track listing ==
No.	Title	Writer(s)	Length
1.	"Change (In the House of Flies)"	Deftones	4:58
2.	"Crenshaw"	Deftones	4:49
3.	"No Ordinary Love" (Sade cover)	Sade Adu; Stuart Matthewman	5:32

== Charts ==
Chart performance for "Change (In the House of Flies)"
Chart (2000)	Peak position
Scotland Singles (OCC)	54
UK Singles (OCC)	53
UK Rock & Metal (OCC)	3
US Bubbling Under Hot 100 (Billboard)	5
US Alternative Airplay (Billboard)	3
US Mainstream Rock (Billboard)	9

== Certifications ==
Certifications for "Change (In the House of Flies)"
Region	Certification	Certified units/sales
New Zealand (RMNZ)	2× Platinum	60,000^{‡}
United Kingdom (BPI)	Gold	400,000^{‡}
United States (RIAA)	4× Platinum	4,000,000^{‡}
^{‡} Sales+streaming figures based on certification alone.
