= Digital Bath =

Promotional single by Deftones

from the album White Pony
- Released: 2000
- Genre: Dream pop
- Length: 4:15
- Label: Maverick
- Songwriters: Stephen Carpenter; Chi Cheng; Abe Cunningham; Frank Delgado; Chino Moreno
- Producers: Terry Date; Deftones

Deftones singles chronology
"Back to School (Mini Maggit)" (2000)	"Digital Bath" (2000)	"Minerva" (2003)

Music video
- "Digital Bath" on YouTube

"Digital Bath" is a song by the American alternative metal band Deftones. It was released as a promotional single from their third studio album, White Pony (2000).

== Composition ==
"Digital Bath" has been described as "ethereal, soaring and soothing", and noted for marking a creative turning point for Deftones. Revolver referred to the song as a "dream-pop spell-caster" and highlighted its incorporation of trip hop elements. They also characterized it as "quiet, pretty, contemplative Deftones at their best", while Sam Law of Kerrang! described the song as perhaps the clearest representation of White Pony's (2000) balance of "beauty and menace". Consequence's Joseph Schafer observed that "Digital Bath" highlights the new wave and post-punk elements that the lead singer Chino Moreno brought to the table, particularly through its "soaring devo vocals and effects-drenched guitar parts and spacious arrangement". The track features samples and echoed guitar work, with instrumentation that is complex yet restrained. Amy Sciarretto of Noisecreep compared its sound to something the singer Sade might attempt "if she went rock", and described the tension as coming from its sense of restraint. Louder's Stephen Hill noted that the song reflected the band's varied influences, stating it had as much in common with Radiohead as it did with Pantera.

According to Andy Price of Guitar.com, the guitar work in "Digital Bath" emphasized atmospheric textures over loud passages. The verses featured back-and-forth, subdued chord swings that created a haunting effect, while occasional squalls and harmonic howls appeared at the edges of the mix. The chorus introduced a sharp contrast, described as holding the listener's head "in a gnarly bucket of noise". These quiet/loud dynamics were enhanced through effects processing. The guitarist Stephen Carpenter favored Boss pedals during the recording, particularly the FZ-2 Fuzz, which was used to add distortion to the chorus sections. The musician Frank Delgado's contributions included ambient effects and samples. Pitchfork's Ian Cohen described a "hollowed-out whoosh" that runs throughout the track, and Law credited Delgado with adding shimmering stillness and depth to the quieter parts of the arrangement. According to MusicRadar's Stuart Williams, the drum work on "Digital Bath" serves as a strong representation of the drummer Abe Cunningham's style. The track features a thick, sleepy linear groove in the intro and verses, with a rhythm that was noted as being reminiscent of funk. The ghosted snare hits blend smoothly with the hi-hats, while the backbeat delivers a sharp, cutting crack. A tom and double splash fill rounds out the section, adding a distinct flourish. The snare sound was singled out as one of White Pony's standout tones and was later made available in a sample pack created with the producer Terry Date.

The lyrics to "Digital Bath" were inspired by a disturbing scenario imagined by Moreno during a late-night party. He recalled picturing a scene in which a girl is brought downstairs to take a bath, then suddenly electrocuted with an electrical device thrown into the water. Afterward, the figure in the scenario calmly dries her off and dresses her again. Moreno later said he doesn't clearly remember writing the lyrics, suggesting he was likely in an altered state of mind at the time. In a 2010 interview, Moreno connected the song's imagery to a period when the band had begun experimenting more with drugs. He explained that sex and violence were dominant lyrical themes on White Pony, calling them a longstanding part of rock music and among the most interesting aspects of it for him. "Digital Bath" was cited as an example of how those themes appear on the album. According to Revolver, the track carries "under-the-surface menace" and a romantic sound, which contrasts with the lyrics. Sciarretto described it as the most feminine Moreno has ever sounded while Law referred to his singing as a "pseudo-sexual 5am musing", with the lyrics adding a "more nightmarish dimension" to the composition.

== Music video ==
The music video for "Digital Bath" was directed by Andrew Bennet. It contrasts the large-scale intimacy between Deftones and their audience with a more private, personal setting. On one side, footage shows Moreno clasping hands with fans in a crowd of thousands, highlighting the physical connection between performer and audience. This is juxtaposed with scenes resembling a one-on-one bathing video, featuring a woman immersed in a tub, captured through infrared visuals.

== Legacy ==
"Digital Bath" has been consistently recognized as one of Deftones' most acclaimed and enduring songs. In a Revolver fan poll ranking the best tracks on White Pony, it placed first, and in another Revolver poll of the band's top five songs overall, it ranked third. Other rankings of "Digital Bath" among Deftones' top songs include Cohen in Uproxx, who placed it second on his list, and Law, who ranked it 18th. Sciarretto named it the 10th most underrated Deftones song, while Hill included it in his list of the 10 best songs Deftones released between 1995 and 2000.

== Cover versions ==
Brandon Smith of the Anix did a cover for his seventh studio album, Hologram.

== Charts ==
Chart performance for "Digital Bath"
Chart (2001)	Peak position
US Alternative Airplay (Billboard)	16
US Mainstream Rock Airplay (Billboard)	38

== Certifications ==
Certifications for "Digital Bath"
Region	Certification	Certified units/sales
New Zealand (RMNZ)	Gold	15,000^{‡}
United States (RIAA)	Gold	500,000^{‡}
^{‡} Sales+streaming figures based on certification alone.
