= Chuckles and Mr. Squeezy =

Studio album by Dredg
- Released: April 25, 2011 (Europe); May 3, 2011 (US)
- Genre: Alternative rock; experimental rock
- Length: 41:30
- Label: Superball Music
- Producer: Dan the Automator

Dredg chronology
The Pariah, the Parrot, the Delusion (2009)	Chuckles and Mr. Squeezy (2011)

Professional ratings
Review scores
Source	Rating
Allmusic	2.5/5 stars
BLARE Magazine	3.5/5 stars
IGN	6.5/10 stars
The Tune	(4.1/5)
Rockfreaks.net	5/10 stars

Chuckles and Mr. Squeezy is the fifth studio album by American rock band Dredg, released on Superball Music. It was released on April 25, 2011 in the United Kingdom and most of Europe, and on May 3, 2011 for the United States.

== Track listing ==
All tracks are written by Dredg.

No.	Title	Length
1.	"Another Tribe"	3:46
2.	"Upon Returning"	3:51
3.	"The Tent"	4:46
4.	"Somebody Is Laughing"	3:31
5.	"Down Without a Fight"	3:51
6.	"The Ornament"	4:06
7.	"The Thought of Losing You"	3:34
8.	"Kalathat"	3:23
9.	"Sun Goes Down"	3:48
10.	"Where I'll End Up"	3:56
11.	"Before it Began"	2:58
