= Buckle Up For Chi =

Seat belt awareness organization

- Abbreviation: BUFC
- Formation: November 2013
- Founders: Craig Leese, Amber Moir, Christina Rogers
- Website: Facebook Twitter Instagram

Buckle Up For Chi or BUFC is an organization founded in November 2013, to honor the memory of Deftones bassist Chi Cheng, who was seriously injured in an automobile accident in November 2008, and died on April 13, 2013. It promotes seat belt awareness.

== Background ==
Chi Cheng died after he was involved in a car accident in late 2008 in which he was not wearing a seat belt. The accident left him in a coma on life support for a few days after the accident. After surgery to replace part of his skull flap that had been removed early in his hospitalization to help reduce swelling caused by the accident Chi showed slow improvement and was able to be upgraded to being in a semi conscious state. He was then able to open his eyes and track movement around the room. He was also able to eventually gain movement in his hands, make vocal sounds and to move his legs on command. His progress was not without setbacks though as he was in and out of the hospital with infections. Throughout this time his family and friends kept a wider group of supporters and the general public updated through oneloveforchi.com with the latest news and fundraising efforts to help pay the medical bills. Chi's health insurance refused to pay for most of the treatments. Chi's mother Jeanne Cheng posted the news of Chi's death by heart failure on oneloveforchi.com on April 13, 2013. Chi left behind his mother, a brother, a sister, his son and his former wife. He also left behind a fan base who cherished him as a Grammy winning bass player and spoken word poet.

== Website ==
Buckle Up for Chi is a volunteer-run organization, and the single vision and mission of the organization is to promote safety belt awareness. The Buckle Up for Chi website has many different features that can appeal to a wide variety of viewers such as photos, fan art, merchandise and a blog.

== Motor vehicle statistics ==
Statistically speaking the Centers for Disease Control classifies Motor Vehicle Accidents as the leading cause of death for people age 30 or younger. The 2011 statistics quote more than 32,000 deaths and more than 2.6 million people were injured in motor vehicle accidents. The prevention status report of 2013 goes on to say that in 2011 nearly 2000 drivers aged 15–20 years were killed and 180,000 were injured.

== Usability and participation ==
Apart from the main Buckle Up For Chi website, there is also the Facebook group, Instagram and Twitter which allows members to choose their own way to stay in contact with each other and the cause in a way that is most common to their daily use. The Facebook group, Instagram and Twitter are a place for members to share pictures of themselves supporting the cause through clothing and other merchandise and to inform others on the street teams about awareness raising they have done in their local areas through fliers and events. It is also a way for them to share their daily stories about buckling up or stories about how someone they talked to protected themselves by buckling up. Jeanne Cheng said:

Not using the few seconds it takes to click your seat belt could result in your life being changed forever as well as the family that loves you and depends on you never being the same again...ever.
