= Orph =

1997 album by Dredg

EP by Dredg
- Released: 1997
- Recorded: Brilliant Studios, San Francisco, California
- Genre: Alternative metal Nu metal Progressive metal
- Length: 11:46
- Label: Woven Records
- Producer: Brian Lillie and Dredg

Dredg chronology
Conscious (1996)	Orph (1997)	Leitmotif (1999)

Orph is a three-song demo that was released by the band Dredg in 1997.

== About the album ==
Drummer Dino Campanella says, "Our first two recordings were written to be rhythmically aggressive. We did the third one, Orph, because we wanted to grow up the right way, from our roots with harmony and melody." Singer Gavin Hayes explains the heavier sound of Orph compared to later releases: "Heavy music back then to me was a little more rebellious. It wasn't so mainstream at the time. You used to have to wait for MTV's Headbanger's Ball to see anything of the sort. It's just different now, and that's kind of why we steered away from it. This was just a natural progression."

== Track listing ==
All tracks are written by Dredg.

No.	Title	Length
1.	"Is Not Everything"	5:56
2.	"Orph"	1:39
3.	"Kayasuma"	4:11

== Personnel ==
- Dredg – producer
- Brian Lillie – producer
- Gavin Hayes – vocals
- Mark Engles – guitar
- Drew Roulette – bass
- Dino Campanella – percussion, drums
- Travis Crenshaw – engineer, mixing
- Jim Andrews – assistant engineer
- Michael Romanowski – mastering
- Beau Roulette – photography
- Dredg – art production
