= Back to School (Mini Maggit) =

Single by Deftones

from the album White Pony (re-release)
- Released: 2000
- Genre: Nu metal; rap rock
- Length: 3:57
- Label: Maverick
- Songwriters: Stephen Carpenter; Chi Cheng; Abe Cunningham; Chino Moreno
- Producer: Terry Date

Deftones singles chronology
"Change (In the House of Flies)" (2000)	"Back to School (Mini Maggit)" (2000)	"Digital Bath" (2000)

Deftones chronology
White Pony (2000)	Back to School (Mini Maggit) (2001)	Deftones (2003)

Alternative cover
- EP edition cover

Music video
- "Back to School (Mini Maggit)" on YouTube

"Back to School (Mini Maggit)" is a song by American alternative metal band Deftones. It is an altered version of the song "Pink Maggit" from the band's third studio album, White Pony (2000). Shortly after the album's initial release, in a contentious move by the band's label Maverick Records, it was re-released with "Back to School (Mini Maggit)" added on.

"Back to School (Mini Maggit)" was released as both a single and as an EP package.

== Background ==
Vocalist Chino Moreno has said, "This album right here [the White Pony re-release] is not the album that we turned in to the label. As far as we're concerned, the first edition was the record. Done. Then, they talked us into re-releasing it with another song on it, and it's not like I'm against the song or whatever, but I liked the sequence we had when we first turned it in. When this version came out, a little part inside all of us felt like: 'Fuck! We just totally compromised.' And I know that a lot of our fans felt bad about it too."

The band also specifically regretted the presence of "Back to School" on the re-release of the album, as Moreno stated in an interview with German rock magazine Visions: "'Back to School' was a mistake. A calculated song, that had been built up with only one aim in mind: It should be a single. ... 'Back to School' was released because I was an idiot. I wanted to prove something [to the record company]. Months later, after White Pony was released, they wanted us to do a new version of "Pink Maggit". They said we lost our heaviness, and there were no more singles on the album. First, I wanted to stick this idea up my ass, but then I thought: 'I'm gonna show those fuckers how easy it is to create a hit-single.' And so I rapped a hip hop part on that song, we shortened it and half an hour later, the hit-single was ready to roll on."

== Musical style ==
The song's style has been described as nu metal and rap rock.

== Critical reception ==
In 2018, the staff of Metal Hammer included the song's music video in the site's list of "the 13 best nu metal videos".

== Track listing ==
Single
No.	Title	Length
1.	"Back to School (Mini Maggit)"	3:57
2.	"Nosebleed" (live)	4:21
3.	"Teething" (live)	3:10

EP
No.	Title	Length
1.	"Back to School (Mini Maggit)"	3:57
2.	"Feiticeira" (live)	3:10
3.	"Back to School (Mini Maggit)" (live)	3:57
4.	"Nosebleed" (live)	4:21
5.	"Teething" (live)	3:10
6.	"Change (In the House of Flies)" (acoustic)	4:59
7.	"Pink Maggit"	7:32
8.	"White Pony EPK" (short version)	8:35

== Charts ==
Chart (2000−2001)	Peak position
Australian Albums (ARIA)	51
Portugal (AFP)	1
Scottish Albums (OCC)	27
UK Albums (OCC)	35
UK Rock & Metal Albums (OCC)	3
US Alternative Airplay (Billboard)	27
US Mainstream Rock Airplay (Billboard)	35
