= The Pariah, the Parrot, the Delusion =

Studio album by Dredg
- Released: June 9, 2009
- Genre: Alternative rock; progressive rock; experimental rock; art rock
- Length: 59:42
- Label: Ohlone Recordings Independent Label Group
- Producer: Matt Radosevich

Dredg chronology
| Live at the Fillmore (2006) | The Pariah, the Parrot, the Delusion (2009) | Chuckles and Mr. Squeezy (2011) |

The Pariah, the Parrot, the Delusion is the fourth studio album by American alternative rock band Dredg, released on June 9, 2009, on Ohlone Recordings. Bassist Drew Roulette describes the album as "a rock and roll record, filled with experimental journeys and eccentric jousts," and states that the album is inspired by a Salman Rushdie essay, entitled Imagine There Is No Heaven: A Letter to the Six Billionth Citizen.

Two singles ("Saviour" and "I Don't Know") were released on iTunes on May 5, 2009. A third single, "Information", was released on May 22, 2009.

The liner notes dedicate the album to the late Deftones bassist Chi Cheng, who was left in a coma resulting from a catastrophic car accident while the band was working on the album.

Professional ratings
Review scores
| Source | Rating |
|---|---|
| Allmusic | link |
| AbsolutePunk.net | (90%) link |
| Antiquiet | link |
| Decoy Music | link |
| Sputnikmusic | link |
| The Tune | (4.4/5) link |

== Track listing ==
All tracks are written by Dredg.

| No. | Title | Length |
|---|---|---|
| 1. | "Pariah" | 4:07 |
| 2. | "Drunk Slide" | 1:27 |
| 3. | "Ireland" | 3:41 |
| 4. | "Stamp of Origin: Pessimistic" | 0:50 |
| 5. | "Light Switch" | 3:30 |
| 6. | "Gathering Pebbles" | 4:59 |
| 7. | "Information" | 5:45 |
| 8. | "Stamp of Origin: Ocean Meets Bay" | 0:30 |
| 9. | "Saviour" | 3:56 |
| 10. | "R U O K?" | 2:12 |
| 11. | "I Don't Know" | 3:45 |
| 12. | "Mourning This Morning" | 5:41 |
| 13. | "Stamp of Origin: Take a Look Around" | 0:58 |
| 14. | "Long Days and Vague Clues" | 1:52 |
| 15. | "Cartoon Showroom" | 4:18 |
| 16. | "Quotes" | 6:04 |
| 17. | "Down to the Cellar" | 3:41 |
| 18. | "Stamp of Origin: Horizon" | 2:20 |
