= 7 Words =

Promotional single by Deftones

from the album Adrenaline
- B-side: "Teething"; "Please, Please, Please Let Me Get What I Want"
- Released: September 1995
- Studio: Bad Animals (Seattle, Washington)
- Genre: Nu metal; rap metal
- Length: 3:44
- Label: Maverick
- Composers: Stephen Carpenter; Chi Cheng; Abe Cunningham; Chino Moreno
- Lyricist: Chino Moreno
- Producers: Terry Date; Deftones

Deftones singles chronology
"7 Words" (1995)	"Bored" (1996)

Music video
- "7 Words" on YouTube

"7 Words" is a song by the American alternative metal band Deftones. It was released as the first promotional single from their debut studio album, Adrenaline (1995), in September 1995. Written by the lead vocalist Chino Moreno, the song expresses teenage anger toward law enforcement. Musically, it has been described as nu metal and rap metal. The song's title refers to the phrase "you have the right to remain silent," and its lyrics have been described as expletive.

Originally created as part of an electronic press kit, the music video for "7 Words" was filmed in Sacramento, featuring footage from the Cattle Club and locations around the city. The track is frequently cited as one of the band's best songs by critics. It has also remained a fixture in Deftones' live performances.

== Background and composition ==
Musically, "7 Words" has been described as "nu metal by the numbers" and a "rap-metal tantrum." Amy Sciarretto of Loudwire argued that the "crunchy, harsh style" of Deftones' debut studio album, Adrenaline (1995), was best represented by the song, adding that "no matter where you are or what you are doing, it will make you jump". Revolver's Gregory Adams wrote that the track "sets off something primal in our cavefolk brains", and that when the band leans into its "twitchy funk-metal groove" in a live performance, "the rest of the joint is going to pop off hard".

Written by the lead vocalist Chino Moreno when he was 16 years old, "7 Words" expresses teenage anger toward law enforcement, reflecting the perspective of a young skate-punk of color. Its title refers to the phrase "you have the right to remain silent," a core part of police procedure. A Billboard writer noted that the song's lyrics "include all the words your mother taught you to avoid". In the chorus, Moreno repeatedly says the word "suck" before ending with the phrase "suck it, you bitch." To capture the desired vocal sound, Moreno recorded the chorus inside a makeshift styrofoam room built in the studio, after being dissatisfied with how it sounded from the control booth. The results were distorted and slightly muffled vocals.

Williams Stuart of MusicRadar wrote that while Adrenaline set the foundation for the drummer Abe Cunningham's sound, his drumming on "7 Words" shows "a different side" to his playing. The song begins with a snare-based, marching-style pattern that accents the rhythm guitar part beneath Moreno's spoken-word vocal. "Second time around", Cunningham shifts to a more traditional kick, snare, and hi-hat arrangement, with Stuart saying that he "keeps the theme going on the hi-hats, each time exploding with flams into the kick-driven chorus." During the halftime breakdown, which Stuart described as "sludgy", Cunningham slows down his playing while interspersing "frenetic" fills. Stuart called this "a simple but effective way of keeping things interesting, rather than opting (as many might) to just play variations on the same groove for each verse."

== Release ==
"7 Words" was serviced to US radio in September 1995 by Maverick Records, as the first promotional single from Adrenaline. The song faced difficulties gaining radio airplay due to its chorus, in which Moreno repeatedly says the word "suck". According to their bassist Chi Cheng, many radio programmers believed a more explicit word was being used. The track's distorted and slightly muffled production also contributed to confusion among listeners regarding the lyrics, which further limited its presence on major commercial radio stations for several months. Despite these challenges, Maverick Records continued to support the band.

=== Music video ===
Directed by Chris Burns, the music video for "7 Words" was filmed in Sacramento in 1995. Originally intended to serve as Deftones' electronic press kit, the video was produced on a budget of $12,000. According to Cunningham, the final result turned out well enough that the band decided to use it as an official video. It features footage shot at the Cattle Club and locations around the city.

== Reception and legacy ==
"7 Words" was well-received by a writer for Billboard, who wrote, "For those who prefer their rock on the foul-mouthed side, the Deftones deliver." Retrospective reviews to the song have remained positive, with some considering it among Deftones' best songs. Sciarretto ranked it as the band's third-best track, calling it "the most well-crafted, moshpit-inducing, singalong-inciting of the bunch". Sam Law in Kerrang! ranked the song fifth, describing it as a "top-of-the-class cut that endures a quarter-century down the line."

"7 Words" has also remained a consistent feature of Deftones' live performances. Adams ranked it as their third-best song performed live, noting that it "occupies a special place in Deftones' hearts", which has contributed to its frequent inclusion in their concert setlists nearly 30 years after its release. Uproxx's Ian Cohen ranked the song their 21st-best and similarly observed that it "continues to show up in Deftones setlists", suggesting that even by 2020, the band's commitment to performing it had not changed.

== Personnel ==
Credits adapted from Adrenaline's liner notes:

Deftones

- Chino Moreno – vocals
- Stephen Carpenter – guitar
- Chi Cheng – bass
- Abe Cunningham – drums

Technical

- Deftones – producer
- Terry Date – producer, engineer, mixing
- Ulrich Wild – engineer
- Tom Smurdy – assistant
- Ted Jensen – mastering
