= Around the Fur =

1997 studio album by Deftones

Studio album by Deftones
- Released: October 28, 1997
- Recorded: April–June 1997
- Studio: Studio Litho (Seattle)
- Genres: Alternative metal; nu metal; post-hardcore
- Length: 73:56 (CD and digital releases)
- Label: Maverick
- Producers: Terry Date; Deftones

Deftones chronology
Adrenaline (1995)	Around the Fur (1997)	White Pony (2000)

Singles from Around the Fur
- 1. "My Own Summer (Shove It)" Released: November 1997; 2. "Be Quiet and Drive (Far Away)" Released: July 6, 1998

Around the Fur is the second studio album by the American alternative metal band Deftones, released on October 28, 1997, through Maverick Records. The songs "My Own Summer (Shove It)" and "Be Quiet and Drive (Far Away)" were released as singles with accompanying music videos. The album was certified Gold by the RIAA in 1999, and then Platinum in 2011.

== Background ==
Recording took place between April and June 1997 at Studio Litho in Seattle, which was owned by Stone Gossard of Pearl Jam. At the time, Pearl Jam were working on their fifth album Yield, and had to use a different studio. Deftones had gathered inspiration from their own internal issues and personal incidents, as the four bandmates rented an apartment in Southern Seattle while they were writing and recording the album. Frontman Chino Moreno and guitarist Stephen Carpenter recall the band often drank and partied frequently, recalling bassist Chi Cheng and Carpenter smoking marijuana frequently and writing riffs together; the two later included their voicemail of them smoking out of a bong as a hidden track between "MX" and "Damone".

It was the second album to feature Frank Delgado under additional personnel; he would later join the band as an official member in 1999. The song "Headup" featured additional vocals by Max Cavalera of Sepultura and Soulfly.

== Album cover ==
The album cover was shot by the photographer Rick Kosick during a late-night party in Seattle near where the band was recording. Upon seeing the candid photo of a woman, the band decided that they wanted to use it as the album cover. Kosick was unsure who the woman was, so the band had to track her down to obtain permission, which she eventually granted. The woman appearing on the cover is Lisa M. Hughes, a friend of Stephen Carpenter. Hughes spoke publicly about the cover for the first time during the album's 20th anniversary in 2017. Moreno has since expressed his dislike of the cover, calling it "horrible", one of the reasons being that it insinuated infidelity of the band members who were married.

== Composition and lyrics ==
"Be Quiet and Drive (Far Away)" (1997)
Sample of "Be Quiet and Drive (Far Away)", the second single from Around the Fur (1997). This shows the album's cleaner production and a tendency toward more melody in the music.

Around the Fur has been described as an alternative metal, nu metal and post-hardcore album. Guitarist Stephen Carpenter has since reflected, "We didn't really pay much attention to that. I remember when these subgenre names didn't exist. It was just metal. So I don't think we made a decision to step away [from nu metal] – we've never paid attention to what anyone else was doing. We just did what we thought was right, and tried to make a killer album." The producer Terry Date stated that the band wanted to become "more sophisticated" with Around the Fur. Lyrically, much of the album addresses topics such as juvenile perception, existential angst, sex, romance, violence, the death of loved ones, and break-ups.

In a 1998 interview with Chart magazine, Moreno commented, "When we went in to make this record, we really didn't have a set idea of what we wanted to come out with." However, he felt that the album "fell into place" once the band had settled into the studio. The band expanded its sound, spending more time with the producer Terry Date, and giving more thought to the album's production. Abe Cunningham varied his drum sound and experimented by using different types of snare drums on almost every track. The album was praised for its loud-soft dynamics, the flow of the tracks, Moreno's unusual vocals, and the strong rhythm section grooves created by Cunningham and Cheng.

== Release ==
The album was highly anticipated, and propelled the band to fame in the alternative metal scene on the strength of radio and MTV airplay for the singles "My Own Summer (Shove It)" and "Be Quiet and Drive (Far Away)". The album's title track was also released as a promotional single. Around the Fur sold 43,000 copies in its first week of release, and entered the Billboard 200 at No. 29 (its peak position), remaining on the chart for 17 weeks. Around the Fur went on to reach RIAA gold status on June 24, 1999, and platinum status on June 7, 2011.

When the album was released on Spotify, it contained an alternate version of "Headup" running a full minute longer than the original release. This version also lacks the transition from Dai the Flu.

=== Touring ===
In May 1997, while Around the Fur was in the process of being recorded, the band performed two concerts at Bojangles in Sacramento. These were their first shows since December 1996, with the band debuting several Around the Fur songs that were still in the demo stages. Their next performance was on September 11, 1997, at The Press Club in San Francisco. This concert saw the debut of live staples "Be Quiet and Drive (Far Away)" and "My Own Summer (Shove It)". Following the album's release in October 1997, Deftones toured North America/Europe with the Sacramento bands Far and Will Haven. The tour continued into early 1998. Later in 1998, they made appearances at the Warped Tour (in the United States, New Zealand and Australia), Pinkpop Festival, Roskilde Festival and Ozzfest, as well as releasing a live EP on April 10, 1998. In September 1998, Deftones toured with Red Hot Chili Peppers, who were playing their first shows in over six years with guitarist John Frusciante.

== Reception and legacy ==
Contemporary ratings
Review scores
Source	Rating
AllMusic	4/5 stars
The Encyclopedia of Popular Music	3/5 stars
The Great Rock Discography	8/10
Kerrang!	5/5 stars
MusicHound Rock	4/5 stars
Music Story	3.5/5 stars
Pitchfork	7.8/10
Q	3/5 stars
The Rolling Stone Album Guide	2/5 stars
Wall of Sound	72/100

Retrospective ratings
Review scores
Source	Rating
AllMusic	4.5/5 stars

The album generally received positive reviews from music critics. Greg Corrao of CMJ New Music Monthly remarked in November 1997, "This hard-hitting noise-fest finds the band once again furthering the cause of riff-heavy, bludgeoning rock also championed by the likes of Soundgarden, Helmet and Kyuss", further adding that, "Those heavy sensibilities are paired with vocalist Chino Moreno's yearning whine, allowing the band to create [their] own kind of sub-metal." He concluded his review by asserting that, "With Around the Fur, Deftones have carved out their own place in heavy music's hard beaten path toward the year 2000." In a retrospective review, AllMusic critic Stephen Thomas Erlewine wrote: "Deftones tap into the same alternative metal vibe as Korn and L7, and while they don't have catchy riffs or a fully developed sound, Around the Fur suggests they're about to come into their own". James P. Wisdom of Pitchfork described the songs from the album as "intense, harsh tunes". Robert Christgau was less receptive, dismissing it as a "dud".

At the 1998 Kerrang! Awards, Around the Fur won the award for "Best Album". Metal Hammer included it as one of the ten best albums released in 1997. They also listed it as being one of the best metal albums released between 1996 and 1997. In 2021, Moreno said that Around The Fur is his favorite Deftones album.

In 2015, the critic Saby Reyes-Kulkarni of Diffuser stated that "[o]n their landmark second album, Deftones infused elements of new wave and shoegaze to define their future direction. Alt-metal would never be the same." Reyes-Kulkarni observed that the album "captures the first full blossoming of the duality that has come to define the Sacramento quintet's musical identity" and "set a new standard for '90s alt-metal and opened doors to what's possible when bands find the motivation to get heavy away from the brutish impulses that typically drive aggressive music." He further noted that, while the album "sounds undeniably thicker and heavier" than the band's debut album Adrenaline, Chino Moreno's new wave and post-punk influences became increasingly evident: "On Around the Fur, Moreno's love of new wave groups like Depeche Mode and the Cure began to rear its head in earnest."

The album has also routinely appeared in various "best-of" listicles focused on the nu metal genre. In 2018, readers of Revolver voted Around the Fur as the fifth-greatest nu metal album of all time. In 2017, Loudwire named it as the third best hard rock album of 1997. In 2019, Joe Smith-Engelhardt of Alternative Press included the song "Headup" in his list of "Top 10 nü-metal staples that still hold up today". When Kerrang! ranked the eight albums Deftones had released as of May 2020, Around the Fur was placed at number four. In 2021, the staff of Revolver included the album in their list of the "20 Essential Nu-Metal Albums". In 2022, Eli Enis of Revolver included the song "Rickets" in his list of the "10 Heaviest Nu-Metal Songs of All Time". In 2025, Rae Lemeshow-Barooshian of Loudwire included the album in her list of "the top 50 nu-metal albums of all time", ranking it seventeenth.

== Track listing ==
All tracks are written by Deftones, except "Headup", written by Deftones and Max Cavalera.

No.	Title	Length
1.	"My Own Summer (Shove It)"	3:35
2.	"Lhabia"	4:11
3.	"Mascara"	3:45
4.	"Around the Fur"	3:31
5.	"Rickets"	2:42
6.	"Be Quiet and Drive (Far Away)"	5:08
7.	"Lotion"	3:57
8.	"Dai the Flu"	4:36
9.	"Headup" (featuring Max Cavalera)	5:12
10.	"MX" (includes hidden tracks (Note: "MX" itself ends at 4:52. On CD and digital editions of the album, it is followed by two hidden tracks, separated between 27 minutes and 21 seconds of silence; "Bong Hit" and "Damone". "Bong Hit" (19:32–19:55) begins, following 14 minutes and 40 seconds of silence. After an additional 12 minutes and 41 seconds of silence, "Damone" (32:36–37:19) ends the album. On vinyl editions of the album, neither of the hidden tracks are featured, and the album ends after "MX".))	37:19
Total length:		73:56

== Personnel ==
Adapted credits from the liner notes of Around the Fur.

Deftones

- Chino Moreno – vocals
- Stephen Carpenter – guitar
- Chi Cheng – bass guitar
- Abe Cunningham – drums

Additional personnel

- Frank Delgado – audio effects on "My Own Summer (Shove It)", "Around the Fur", "Dai the Flu", "Headup" and "MX"
- Max Cavalera – additional vocals and guitar on "Headup"
- Annalynn Cunningham – backing vocals on "MX"

Production

- Terry Date – production, mixing, recording
- Ulrich Wild – mixing, recording, digital editing
- Matt Bayles – recording assistant
- Steve Durkee – mixing assistant
- Ted Jensen – mastering
- Rick Kosick – photography
- Kevin Estrada – photo of Dana Wells
- Kevin Reagan – art direction, design

== Charts ==
Chart (1997)	Peak position
Dutch Albums (Album Top 100)	99
Finnish Albums (Suomen virallinen lista)	32
French Albums (SNEP)	41
Scottish Albums (Official Charts)	93
UK Albums (Official Charts)	56
UK Rock & Metal Albums (Official Charts)	2
US Billboard 200	29

Chart (2024–2026)	Peak position
Belgian Albums (Ultratop Flanders)	62
Belgian Albums (Ultratop Wallonia)	91
Croatian International Albums (HDU)	22
Portuguese Albums (AFP)	48

== Certifications ==
Region	Certification	Certified units/sales
Australia (ARIA)	Gold	35,000^{^}
New Zealand (RMNZ)	Gold	7,500^{‡}
United Kingdom (BPI)	Gold	100,000^{^}
United States (RIAA)	Platinum	1,000,000^{^}
^{^} Shipments figures based on certification alone.^{‡} Sales+streaming figures based on certification alone.
