= El Cielo (album) =

2002 album by Dredg

- Cover used for digipak release

Studio album by dredg
- Released: October 8, 2002
- Studio: George Lucas' Skywalker Ranch in Nicasio, CA and at Longview Farm in North Brookfield, MA
- Genre: Alternative rock; progressive rock; experimental rock; post-rock; art rock
- Length: 57:08
- Label: Interscope
- Producer: Ron St. Germain; dredg; Tim Palmer; Michael Rosen

Dredg chronology
Extended Play for the Eastern Hemisphere (2001)	El Cielo (2002)	Catch Without Arms (2005)

Professional ratings
Review scores
Source	Rating
AllMusic	2.5/5 stars
AbsolutePunk	98%
Decoy Music	4/5 stars
Kludge	9/10
Pitchfork	5.6/10
Punknews.org	4.5/5 stars
Spin	6/10
Sputnikmusic	5/5 stars
Stylus Magazine	B+

El Cielo is the second album from the American progressive/alternative rock band, dredg. It was released on October 8, 2002, by Interscope Records. Like dredg's first album, Leitmotif, El Cielo is a concept album. The title can be translated to mean "the sky" or "the heaven" in Spanish, and to mean "peace and freedom of expression" in dreams.

== Recording ==
The album was recorded at George Lucas' Skywalker Ranch in Nicasio, CA, and at Long View Farm in North Brookfield, MA. Producers included Ron St. Germain, Tim Palmer, and Michael Rosen.

El Cielo has also been released in the SACD format. This particular disc is a multi-channel hybrid SACD. It is playable as a standard CD in a normal CD player. However, in an SACD player, the album is played in high resolution audio with surround sound.

=== Song Details ===
The song "Brushstroke: Reprise" can be divided in two parts, the first part is a 40-second alternate version of the song "Same ol' Road" (hence the title "reprise"). The second part is an extract from a song called "Wind at the End", which was recorded by the band but not released on any studio album, EP, or DVD.

A demo of the song "Of the Room" appeared on their 2001 Industry Demos EP, and later on Extended Play for the Eastern Hemisphere.

== Inspiration ==
One of dredg's main influences on the album, El Cielo, was a painting by Salvador Dalí entitled Dream Caused by the Flight of a Bee Around a Pomegranate a Second Before Awakening, which is also what the acronym in the title "Brushstroke: dcbtfoabaaposba", stands for ("one" second instead of "a" second). The painting clearly influences many of the album's core themes and song titles. For example, in the painting there is a long-legged elephant ("An Elephant In The Delta Waves") with a papal insignia upon its back. "The Papal Insignia" was a song recorded for El Cielo but only saw release of Industry Demos, recorded in 2001, and didn't make it onto El Cielo. Also pictured in the painting is a woman lying in a canyon: "The Canyon Behind Her" is the title of the last song on the album.

This is further supported by the translation of the Japanese spoken words from the beginning of "The Canyon Behind Her": "This album was inspired by a painting titled 'Dream Caused by the Flight of a Bee Around a Pomegranate a Second Before Awakening'. It is recommended that you view this painting as you listen to El Cielo. It is as if one stimulus awakens other senses. In other words, it's about 'drawing music'".

Band members have also been quoted as saying that this Dalí painting symbolizes sleep paralysis, a literal representation of the condition from which Dalí's wife actually suffered. The booklet with El Cielo contains letters written by sufferers of sleeping disorders with descriptions of various experiences with or relating to sleep paralysis. Singer/Songwriter Gavin Hayes incorporates and expands upon the material found in the booklet for the lyrics to the album.

== Packaging ==
Early pressings of El Cielo were in a digipack with pictures of clouds bordered by runes. Later pressings of El Cielo are in a jewel case. The cover of the later versions is the cover of the booklet, which is a sort of brown leathery texture with the band's name and the album name on it (although jewel case versions with the "clouds" cover are known to exist). The image provided on this page is the cover of the digipack version. The booklet which came with versions featuring the "clouds" cover are in full color, the booklet included in copies featuring the "brown leather" cover are in black and white, except for the limited digipak version. This version has a clouds packaging with the brown leather booklet in full color. All releases of the album contain the same disc except for the limited jewel case version, which disc is yellow and white and the SACD version which is an all-white gold disc with blue writing.

== Track listing ==
All tracks are written by dredg.

No.	Title	Length
1.	"Brushstroke: dcbtfoabaaposba"	0:57
2.	"Same ol' Road"	5:14
3.	"Sanzen"	4:34
4.	"Brushstroke: New Heart Shadow"	1:33
5.	"Triangle" (Listed as "Δ" on the CD cover)	5:03
6.	"Sorry But It's Over"	4:08
7.	"Convalescent"	3:32
8.	"Brushstroke: Walk in the Park"	1:40
9.	"Eighteen People Living in Harmony"	4:28
10.	"Scissor Lock"	3:23
11.	"Brushstroke: Reprise"	1:33
12.	"Of the Room"	3:44
13.	"Brushstroke: An Elephant in the Delta Waves"	1:47
14.	"It Only Took a Day"	3:16
15.	"Whoa Is Me"	5:36
16.	"The Canyon Behind Her"	6:40
Total length:		57:08

== Personnel ==
dredg

- Gavin Hayes – vocals, guitar, lap-steel guitar, acoustic guitar, mandolin, trumpet
- Mark Engles – guitars
- Drew Roulette – bass, samples
- Dino Campanella – drums, piano, keyboards

Additional musicians

- Ron Saint Germaine – vocals
- Zack Hexum – saxophone
- Greg Ellis – percussion

Production

- Ron Saint Germain - production on tracks 1–6, 8–11, 13–16, mixing on track 1, 8, 10, 13
- Tim Palmer - production on track 7 and 16, mixing (at Track Record Studios in Hollywood)
- Micheal Rosen - mixing, production on "Of The Room" (track 12)

== Music videos ==
- "Same ol' Road" directed by American McGee.
- "Of the Room" directed by Ben Rehki.

== Crickets ==
Crickets

Video by Dredg
- Released: 2003
- Genre: Alternative rock
- Label: Interscope

Dredg chronology
Crickets (2003)	Live from the Henry Fonda Theater (2005)

The Crickets DVD was a promotional item that was to be given away with copies of Dredg's second album, El Cielo, on tour. It was first given away by band members during the March 2003 SnoCore tour. As this concert was not heavily advertised many fans were unaware the event was taking place, never receiving a copy. In an effort to make up for this, for a limited amount of time anyone who spent $50 or more at dredg's webstore received a signed copy with their purchase.

The DVD consists of three sections. The first is the band's Electronic Press Kit, the second a long video entitled "An Elephant in Halong Bay" which begins with the El Cielo track "Brushstroke: An Elephant in the Delta Waves" and ends with "Halong Bay", a b-side from the El Cielo recording sessions. Around eight minutes of footage in between the two tracks shows various video clips of the band. Two other b-sides played during the videos include "walter's sound track" & "birds". The third section of the DVD is the music video for "Same ol' Road".

The DVD is now out of print.

== Track listing ==
1. "E.P.K."
2. "An Elephant in Halong Bay"
3. "Same ol' Road"
