= Catch Without Arms =

Studio album by Dredg
- Released: June 21, 2005
- Genres: Alternative rock; post-rock; progressive rock; experimental rock; art rock
- Length: 51:43
- Label: Interscope
- Producers: Dredg, Terry Date

Dredg chronology
El Cielo (2002)	Catch Without Arms (2005)	Live at the Fillmore (2006)

Singles from Catch Without Arms
- 1. "Bug Eyes" Released: May 5, 2005

Professional ratings
Review scores
Source	Rating
AllMusic	3.5/5 stars
Decoy Music	4.5/5 stars
IGN	7.5/10 stars
ThePRP	3.5/5 stars
Punknews.org	3.5/5 stars
Sputnikmusic	4/5 stars
Kevchino	9/10 stars
Stylus Magazine	C+

Catch Without Arms is the third studio album from the alternative rock band Dredg, released on June 21, 2005 on Interscope. Produced by Terry Date and the band itself, the album marked a change to a simpler and more straightforward musical style.

== Background and release ==
Lead singer Gavin Hayes commented on his lyrical approach to this album, saying, "The whole underlying basis of the lyrics and the music is opposites, contrasts... I’d written some lyrics that are based around conversations or arguments, so we thought about a record with two halves that contrast each other. The whole basis of the record could be about objection to ideas, and contrast."

The album was released with a booklet containing art created by Dredg bassist, Drew Roulette and lead singer, Gavin Hayes. Initially there was an original painting created for each song and two others, a total of 14 paintings, in the Catch Without Arms Collection. These paintings, while abstract in nature, all contain elements directly and indirectly related to the song they portray. The artwork was not only an accompaniment to the album, but also the map to a treasure. Over several weeks, various clues were posted on the official Dredg website that were meant to point users to a buried treasure of sorts. Once the treasure was found, another hunt began for the three people who found the original treasure.

Catch Without Arms was produced by Terry Date, who had previously produced multiple Soundgarden, Pantera, Deftones and Limp Bizkit albums. Former Queensrÿche guitarist Chris DeGarmo worked with the band on production and arrangement of the album. DeGarmo also shared writing credits on two tracks.

== Track listing ==
=== Part 1 ===
All tracks are written by Dredg, except where noted.

No.	Title	Length
1.	"Ode to the Sun" (Chris DeGarmo, dredg)	4:12
2.	"Bug Eyes"	4:13
3.	"Catch Without Arms"	4:11
4.	"Not That Simple"	4:56
5.	"Zebraskin"	3:26
6.	"The Tanbark Is Hot Lava"	3:45
7.	"Sang Real"	4:28

=== Part 2 ===
No.	Title	Length
8.	"Planting Seeds"	4:12
9.	"Spitshine" (Chris DeGarmo, dredg)	3:34
10.	"Jamais Vu"	4:55
11.	"Hung Over on a Tuesday"	4:05
12.	"Matroshka"	5:48

=== Bonus track ===
No.	Title	Length
13.	"Uplifting News"	3:22

== Personnel ==
- Gavin Hayes – Vocals
- Terry Date – Producer, Engineer, Mixing
- Chris DeGarmo – Arranger
- Ingrid Erickson – Editing
- Benny Gordon – A&R
- Sam Hofstedt – Engineer, Assistant, Pro-Tools
- Ted Jensen – Mastering
- Scott Olson – Engineer, Pro-Tools
- Floyd Reitsman – Engineer, Assistant, Pro-Tools
- Kelly Sato – Marketing Coordinator
- Les Scurry – Production Coordination
- Mark Williams – A&R

== Music videos ==
- "Bug Eyes"

== Other songs ==
- "Uplifting News" - 3:22 (released on import/non U.S. editions of Catch Without Arms)
- "Stationary Transient" - 3:59 (released on the "Bug Eyes" 7" Vinyl)
- "Stone By Stone" - 3:56 (released on a bonus CD with issue 150 of the German magazine Visions in September 2005)

== Artwork ==
These are the paintings released by the band, all painted by Drew Roulette and Gavin Hayes, for each of the album tracks and two additional paintings included in the Catch Without Arms Collection:

- "Ode To The Sun" - "Outline & Color"
- "Bug Eyes" - "Grace & Seriousness"
- "Catch Without Arms" - "Freedom & Order"
- "Not That Simple" - "Depth & Surface"
- "Zebraskin" - "Truth & Imagination"
- "The Tanbark Is Hot Lava" - "Logic & Emotion"
- "Sang Real (#1)" "Sang Real (#2)" - "Oneness & Manyness".
- "Planting Seeds" - "Sameness & Difference"
- "Spitshine" - "Impersonal & Personal"
- "Jamais Vu" - "Light & Dark"
- "Hung Over On A Tuesday" - "Heaviness & Lightness"
- "Matroshka" - "Universe & Object"
