= Leitmotif (album) =

Studio album by Dredg
- Released: May 30, 1999
- Recorded: Summer 1998
- Studios: Brilliant Studios, San Francisco, California
- Genres: Progressive rock; alternative rock; experimental rock; alternative metal; nu metal
- Length: 54:28
- Labels: Woven Recordings; Interscope (re-release)
- Producers: Travis Crenshaw; dredg

Dredg chronology
| Orph (1997) | Leitmotif (1999) | Extended Play for the Eastern Hemisphere (2001) |

Alternative covers
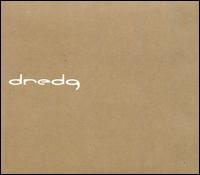
- 2001 reissue cover

Professional ratings
Review scores
| Source | Rating |
|---|---|
| AllMusic | 3/5 stars |
| ThePRP | 5/5 stars |
| Sputnikmusic | 4.5/5 stars |

Leitmotif is the debut studio album by American rock band Dredg. The album was originally self-released on May 30, 1999, through the band's own label, Woven Recordings, before being nationally re-released in the United States by Interscope Records, with different artwork, on September 11, 2001. A "leitmotif" is a recurring musical theme associated within a particular piece of music with a particular person, place, or idea. The album is currently out of print.

== Content ==
Leitmotif was recorded in ten days.

Interscope Records re-released Leitmotif unchanged from its original version, both in the recording and in the booklet's text, essentially duplicating the band's original, independently released demo.

The newer case features the uniform brown paper package with white text as pictured, to the lower right, with only the phrase "We live like penguins in the desert. Why can't we live like tribes?" printed on the inner sleeve; a phrase used in the lyrics to Triangle on Dredg's next album, El Cielo. The older case features the cover pictured, to the upper right, as well as more brown and blue topographical photos on the case and the booklet which are similar to the cover. Aside from the difference in artwork, the two versions of Leitmotif remain nearly identical.

Most of the lyrics can be found at Traversing; the lyrics to parts of several verses (and most of one whole song) are unknown outside the band. All the music found on this album is created by Dredg; there are no samples. As claimed in the booklet, "all instruments and sounds are real. No samples."

Leitmotif was produced and engineered by Dredg and Travis Crenshaw, and was recorded at Brilliant Studios in San Francisco, CA.

In May 2010, to celebrate the album's 11th birthday, the band re-released a limited edition of the album on vinyl, with only 500 copies produced. In addition, the band performed the album in its entirety during the tour dates surrounding the anniversary. During the live performance of the album, Gus Lyndon Farwell, who sang the operatic parts on track 6, "Movement III: Lyndon", on the original recording, made a guest appearance on the song.

== Track listing ==
All tracks are written by Dredg.

| No. | Title | Length |
|---|---|---|
| 1. | "易" (Symbol Song) | 4:24 |
| 2. | "Movement I: @45°N, 180°W" | 1:02 |
| 3. | "Lechium" | 6:24 |
| 4. | "Movement II: Crosswind Minuet" | 1:32 |
| 5. | "Traversing Through the Arctic Cold We Search for the Spirit of Yuta" (+ intermission) | 6:38 |
| 6. | "Movement III: Lyndon" | 3:07 |
| 7. | "Penguins in the Desert" | 4:13 |
| 8. | "Movement IV: RR" | 2:59 |
| 9. | "Yatahaze" | 3:44 |
| 10. | "Movement V: 90 Hour Sleep" (+ hidden track) | 20:23 |

- The track list on the back of the album simply lists the name of the first track as a variation of the Chinese character, 易 (pinyin: yì), which means "change". However, since this character is not in the English language, most sources simply list the title as "Symbol Song" (including the band's official website). The song starts after eight seconds of silence.

== Release history ==
| Region | Date | Label | Format |
|---|---|---|---|
| United States | May 30, 1999 | Woven Recordings | HDCD |
| United States | September 11, 2001 | Interscope Records | CD |
| United States | May 11, 2010 | Ohlone Recordings | Vinyl LP |
