= White Pony =

2000 studio album by Deftones

- Original CD release cover art

Studio album by Deftones
- Released: June 20, 2000
- Recorded: August–December 1999
- Studios: Record Plant (Sausalito); Larrabee (West Hollywood)
- Genres: Alternative metal; nu metal; art rock; post-rock; shoegaze
- Length: 48:43 (52:40 on the reissue)
- Label: Maverick
- Producers: Terry Date; Deftones

Deftones chronology
Around the Fur (1997)	White Pony (2000)	Deftones (2003)

Singles from White Pony
- 1. "Change (In the House of Flies)" Released: May 16, 2000; 2. "Back to School (Mini Maggit)" Released: 2000

White Pony is the third studio album by the American alternative metal band Deftones, released on June 20, 2000, through Warner subsidiary Maverick Records. It was produced by Terry Date, who produced the band's first two albums, Adrenaline (1995) and Around the Fur (1997). Recording sessions took place at The Plant Recording Studios in Sausalito, California, with additional recording at Larrabee Sound Studios in West Hollywood.

The album marked a significant growth in the band's sound, incorporating influences from post-hardcore, trip hop, shoegaze, progressive rock, and post-rock into the alternative metal sound which they had become known for. White Pony was also the first recording to feature Frank Delgado as a full-time member of the band on turntables and synthesizer; Delgado had previously worked with the band as a featured guest on their first two albums, producing sound effects on some songs. It was also the first Deftones album on which Chino Moreno began to contribute rhythm guitar parts.

Upon its release and retrospectively, the album received generally positive reviews, and was regarded by fans and critics alike as one of the band's most mature outings at that point. The album includes two successful singles ("Change (In the House of Flies)" and "Back to School (Mini Maggit)"), the promotional single "Digital Bath", as well as the 2001 Grammy Award–winning track for Best Metal Performance, "Elite". The album received a 20th anniversary reissue, packaged with Black Stallion, a companion remix album of White Pony, in December 2020.

== Background and recording ==
After a break from touring, the band spent four months in the studio writing and recording White Pony with the producer Terry Date, the longest amount of time they had dedicated to an album thus far. The singer Chino Moreno explained that the majority of this time was spent trying to write songs, and that the writing of "Change (In the House of Flies)" was the turning point where the band began working as a unit.

Despite being pressured to release the album sooner, the band decided to take their time making the album. The bassist Chi Cheng explained, "We didn't feel like we had anything to lose, so we made the record we wanted to make." Moreno did not have an overall lyrical theme in mind, but made a conscious decision to bring an element of fantasy into his lyrics, explaining, "I basically didn't sing about myself on this record. I made up a lot of story lines and some dialogue, even. I took myself completely out of it and wrote about other things. Once I did that I was able to sing about anything I wanted to, I could be a lot more general. There's a lot of stuff on this record that people are going to question me about, and I can just remove myself from it. It's not me. I'm writing a story here." Moreno later claimed in a 2020 interview that his decision to play rhythm guitar on the album caused tensions to escalate with the guitarist Stephen Carpenter during the writing process. Despite the tensions, Moreno and Carpenter found themselves on friendlier terms and found a cohesive songwriting process for most of the album's tracks, with Moreno claiming, "Initially, I don't think the idea was that I was going to actually play on the record, even. Then I remember Stephen specifically saying, 'Dude, if you're going to play it in practice, then you're going to play on the record!' and I was like, 'Oh, okay… If that's cool with you!' I don't think he was too happy about it, to be honest, then [...] I do remember us both smiling at each other when we were sitting listening to the track being made, and the fusing of both our guitars, the sound of it, the way that Terry [Date] produced it."

Although the band initially did not intend to include guest musicians on the album, it features additional vocals by Maynard James Keenan of Tool, A Perfect Circle, and Puscifer on "Passenger" and Rodleen Getsic (simply credited as Rodleen) on "Knife Prty". "Rx Queen" also features vocal contributions from the Stone Temple Pilots singer Scott Weiland, though he is uncredited. Weiland brought Moreno to his studio for collaboration, where he would sing along and suggest vocal harmonies; the result was left in the final version of the song, and credit for Weiland's part was never discussed by either party.

== Composition ==
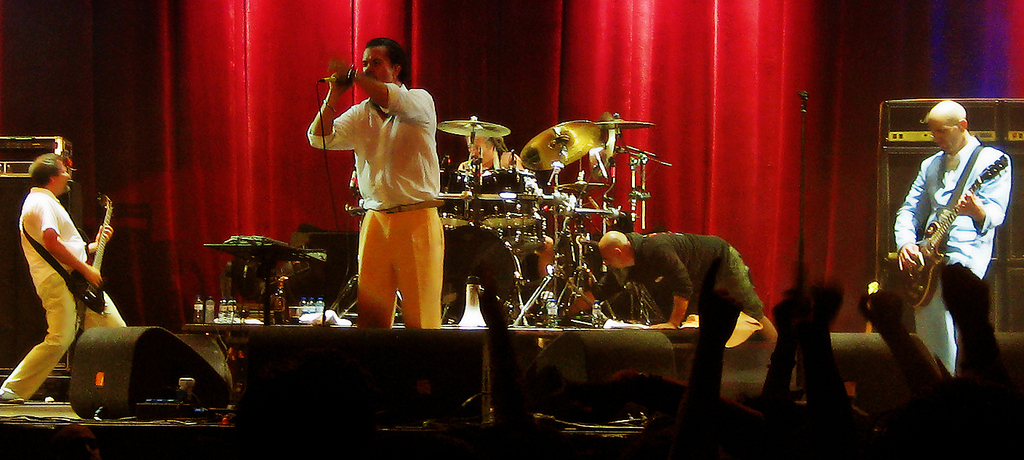
Faith No More have been recognized as an influence on the music of White Pony

Stylistically, White Pony combines the band's standard alternative metal sound, influenced by bands such as Tool, Faith No More, Nine Inch Nails, and Pink Floyd, with the layered atmospherics of the Cure, specifically their Pornography era. It has also been categorized as an art rock and nu metal album, though several critics also acknowledge that the record moved beyond the latter label. Metal Hammer likened the album to a metal version of Radiohead's critically acclaimed OK Computer (1997).

Lyrically, much of the album centers around "sex and violence", which Moreno considered "a big part of fucking rock 'n' roll"; he attributed some of that to the band's drug use at the time, noting that while he considers "Digital Bath"―a song about electrocuting a girl in a bathtub―some of his favorite lyrics, he doesn't remember writing them.

"Elite" is more straightforward and heavy and lacks typical Deftones dynamics, containing industrial rock influences. Moreno said that the song "is laughing at everybody trying to become what they already are. If you want to be one of the elite, you are". Moreno considers "Rx Queen" "the most futuristic song in the album". About "Street Carp", Moreno said: "It's a classic Deftones song, with a rolling riff and some really interesting chords in the chorus. The vocals are kinda crazy - I'm singing out loud over the top of the music, like (the Smiths singer) Morrissey or something, a cool contrast". Moreno stated that he wrote the lyrics to "Teenager" when he was 15 after a first date and that it was originally a Team Sleep song.

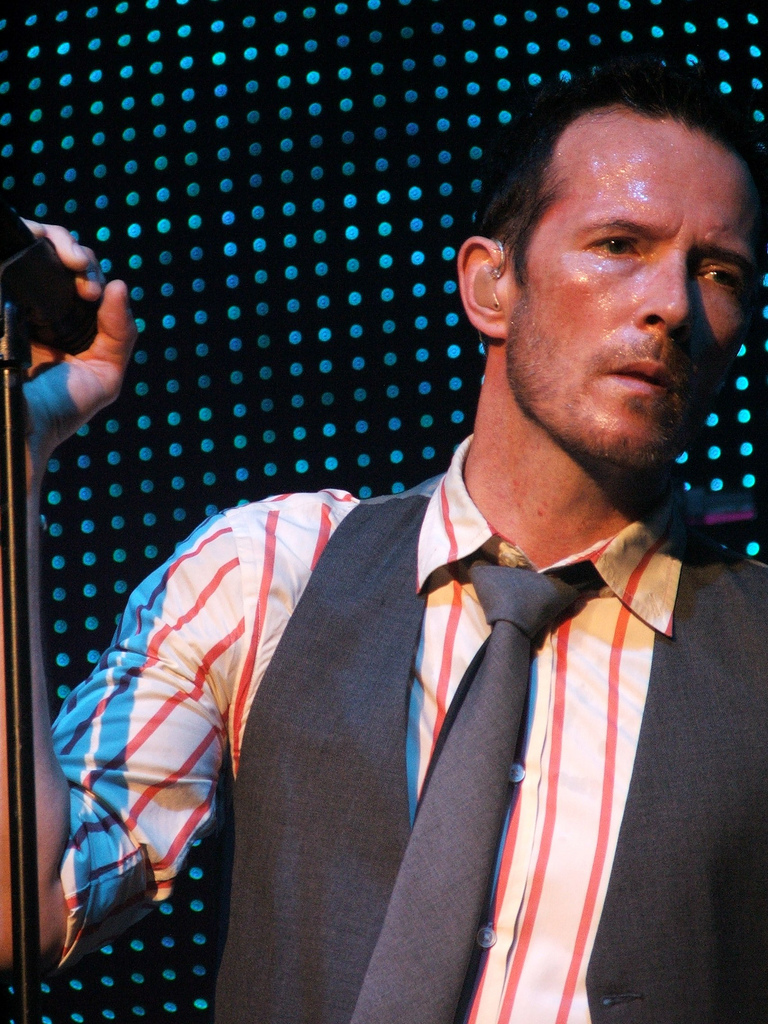
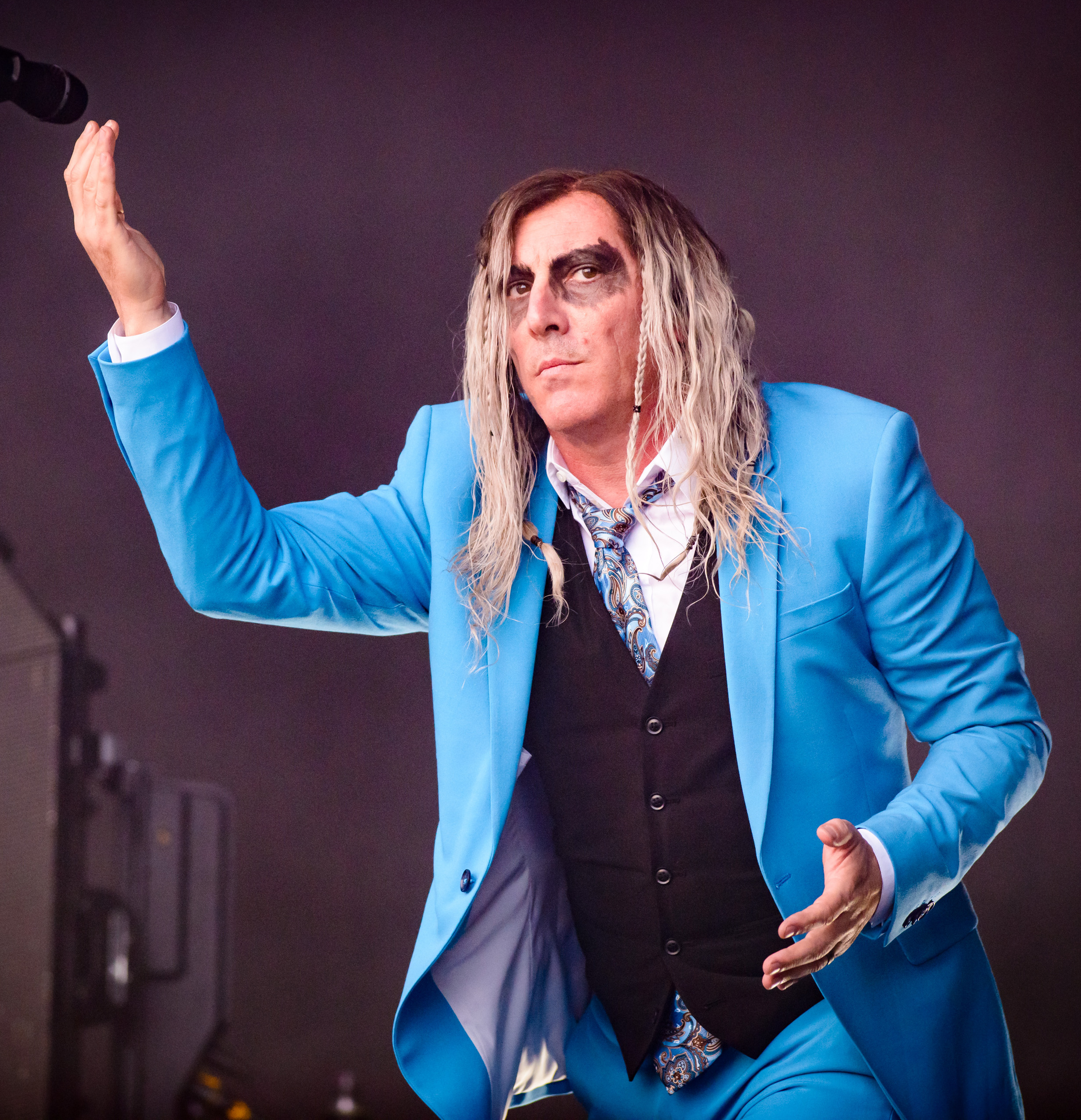
White Pony features guest vocals from Scott Weiland (left) on "Rx Queen" and Maynard James Keenan on "Passenger"

Moreno said about "Knife Prty", "It's a seductive song with a lot of violent imagery. People don't tend to like sex mixed with violence. The mid section has amazing vocals from a girl called Rodleen who worked next door to our studio". "Passenger" features a guitar intro and vocal interplay between Maynard James Keenan and Moreno alongside piano and keyboard lines, leading to heavy guitar that introduces the choruses.

"Change (In the House of Flies)" was the album's lead single, and became a radio hit. Moreno compared it to earlier single "Be Quiet and Drive (Far Away)", considering it "a beautiful metamorphosis". The closer, "Pink Maggit" is a "brooding, surreal epic" which ends with a recorded heartbeat. The title is a reference to a line in the Dr. Dooom song "No Chorus" on the album First Come, First Served which mocks Nas. Leading off the reissued version of the album, "Back to School (Mini Maggit)" is a reinterpretation of the album's closer with additional rap or hip-hop influences. Moreno at first appreciated the support the band received from the label as a result of recording the track, but later declared that he regretted the creation of the song and its placement on the album.

== Album title ==
"White pony" is a street slang for cocaine. However, there are other meanings for the album name, including a sexual reference, as explained by Moreno:

"There's a lot of different references for White Pony. One of them is a cocaine reference and there's a lot of stuff... have you ever heard stuff like in dream books that if you dream about a white pony, then you're having a sexual dream? There's a lot of stuff that kinda goes around it. And there's an old song [that goes], 'Ride the white horse.' That's obviously a drug-reference song."

The cover art pays homage to Hum's 1995 album You'd Prefer an Astronaut, which was a significant influence on Moreno and Deftones' musical style.

== Release ==
Upon release, White Pony debuted at No. 3 on the Billboard 200 below Britney Spears' Oops!... I Did It Again and Eminem's The Marshall Mathers LP, selling 178,000 copies in its first week. It is Deftones' highest-selling album to date, being certified 2× platinum by the RIAA on July 3, 2025. The album was also certified platinum in Australia and New Zealand, and gold in Canada and the United Kingdom.

Five different editions of the album exist. On its release date, limited-edition numbered copies were released with solid red and black jewel cases. The two differently colored cases also featured different booklet inserts. Both limited-edition versions included "The Boy's Republic" but not "Back to School (Mini Maggit)." The edition with a gray cover was released as the initial non-limited version of the album and did not include "The Boy's Republic". This, along with the red and black versions, were the properly sequenced version of the album as the band intended. The gray version was later superseded by the current white version, which added "Back to School (Mini Maggit)" as the first track. This was only added as a marketing strategy, a decision that Moreno stated that he was unhappy with.

In honor of the album's 20th anniversary, Deftones re-released White Pony on December 11, 2020, packaged with Black Stallion, a bonus remix album. Black Stallion features the full track list of the original White Pony album in order with each song recreated by a different producer with an "electronic, beat-driven" approach. Deftones originally conceived of doing a remix album prior to the recording of White Pony and had reached out to DJ Shadow to remix the entire album himself. Black Stallion includes remixes from DJ Shadow, Clams Casino, Robert Smith, Mike Shinoda and more; and was promoted with a music video for Purity Ring's remix of "Knife Prty".

== Reception ==
Professional ratings
Aggregate scores
Source	Rating
Metacritic	72/100
Review scores
Source	Rating
AllMusic	5/5 stars
Entertainment Weekly	B+
Kerrang!	5/5
Los Angeles Times	3/4 stars
Melody Maker	4/5 stars
NME	8/10
Pitchfork	8.4/10
Rolling Stone	3/5 stars
Spin	4/10
The Village Voice	(dud)

According to the review aggregator Metacritic, White Pony received "generally favorable reviews" based on a weighted average score of 72 out of 100 from 15 critic scores.

Billboard gave the album 4 out of 5 stars, though it cautioned that "the band's continuous inclination toward a bludgeoning experimental sonic attack and Moreno's violent, impressionistic lyrics made the album a tough pill to swallow for most listeners". Similarly, BBC Music praised the album while opining: "[The fact] that such a progressive, risk-taking LP wasn't celebrated across the board for its gutsy reinventing of a band thought pigeonholed wasn't that surprising, though – this is a difficult album." In a favorable review, Alternative Press noted the album's "art-rock explorations." Publications such as Rolling Stone and Q were somewhat less enthusiastic. The former lamented that the album was overproduced to sound too much like their influencers, while the latter wondered if White Pony was "their most adventurous and assured album to date".

In 2016, Jonathan Dick of NPR Music retrospectively praised the album as a watershed moment or turning point, not only in regards to the Deftones' sound but also, more generally, to heavy and experimental music in the new millennium, describing the album as signaling "not only a change for the band but a new trajectory for heavy and experimental music entering the 21st century". Dick especially noted the album's "shift into the heavy post-rock, shoegaze spectrum" and contended that, within the span of five years from the band's debut album to the release of White Pony, Deftones had distinguished itself as a band "whose sound no longer fit too comfortably under any genre-specific title". Similarly, Mike Diver of Clash magazine asserted that White Pony "changed everything – not just for Deftones, but metal as a whole", noting the album's "distinct air of progressive rock" and its ability to weave electronics into aggressive yet reflective songs. Pitchfork retrospectively noted that White Pony "transcended the dubious genre [of nu-metal] by fashioning a truly new form from post-hardcore, industrial, trip-hop, shoegaze, ambient electronics, and synth-pop."

=== Accolades ===
Alternative Press ranked White Pony as the second best album of 2000, and in their September 2010 issue, placed it in their list of the "Top 10 Most Influential Albums of 2000". UK rock magazine Kerrang! named White Pony their third best album of the year behind Queens of the Stone Age's Rated R and At the Drive-In's Relationship of Command. In 2011, Complex Media Network's music website, Consequence of Sound, honored White Pony on a "List 'Em Carefully" installment dedicated to writer David Buchanan's top 13 metal records released between 2000 and 2010, noting that Deftones was one of several acts who "helped usher the popularity of complex structure meets MTV audience". In 2017, Rolling Stone ranked White Pony as 66th on their list of 'The 100 Greatest Metal Albums of All Time.' In 2019, The Guardian ranked it 29th on their list of 'The 100 best albums of the 21st century'. Also in 2019, Rae Lemeshow-Barooshian of Loudwire included the album on her list of "the top 50 nu-metal albums of all time", ranking it fifth. In 2020, it was named one of the 20 best metal albums of 2000 by Metal Hammer magazine.

The album's third track, "Elite", won the Grammy Award for Best Metal Performance in 2001. The Deftones drummer Abe Cunningham commented on the awards night: "All the people were on the ground, on the floor, and we were up sort of in the balcony, we were like, 'We're not gonna win. Look where we're sitting.' Everybody else who was winning, they'd get up there quick and get back. So we were just watching it and the whole thing was rad, just seeing the (stuff) go down. And all of a sudden they called our name. We just jumped over this balcony down onto the floor and ran up there. It was pretty cool, man".

The album won the 2000 Kerrang! Award for Album of the Year.

At the 2001 California Music Awards, it won Outstanding Hard Rock/Heavy Metal Album.

== Track listing ==
All tracks are written by Deftones (Stephen Carpenter, Chi Cheng, Abe Cunningham, Frank Delgado, Chino Moreno) except "Passenger", written by Deftones and Maynard James Keenan.

White Pony original edition (gray cover) track listing
No.	Title	Length
1.	"Feiticeira"	3:09
2.	"Digital Bath"	4:15
3.	"Elite"	4:01
4.	"Rx Queen" (featuring Scott Weiland)	4:27
5.	"Street Carp"	2:41
6.	"Teenager"	3:20
7.	"Knife Prty (Note: "Knife Prty" (track 7, or 8 on the reissue) is spelled "Knife Party" on most of the European versions of the album and contains backing vocals by Rodleen Getsic.)"	4:49
8.	"Korea"	3:23
9.	"Passenger" (featuring Maynard James Keenan)	6:07
10.	"Change (In the House of Flies)"	4:59
11.	"Pink Maggit"	7:32
Total length:		48:43

Limited edition (red and black covers) bonus track
No.	Title	Length
12.	"The Boy's Republic"	4:35
Total length:		53:18

Reissue (white cover) track listing
No.	Title	Length
1.	"Back to School (Mini Maggit)"	3:57
2.	"Feiticeira"	3:09
3.	"Digital Bath"	4:15
4.	"Elite"	4:01
5.	"Rx Queen"	4:27
6.	"Street Carp"	2:41
7.	"Teenager"	3:20
8.	"Knife Prty"	4:49
9.	"Korea"	3:23
10.	"Passenger" (featuring Maynard James Keenan)	6:07
11.	"Change (In the House of Flies)"	4:59
12.	"Pink Maggit"	7:32
Total length:		52:40

Black Stallion remix album track listing
No.	Title	Remixed by	Length
1.	"Feiticeira"	Clams Casino	2:02
2.	"Digital Bath"	DJ Shadow	3:24
3.	"Elite"	Blanck Mass	5:20
4.	"Rx Queen"	Salva	4:14
5.	"Street Carp"	Phantogram	3:31
6.	"Teenager"	Robert Smith	3:07
7.	"Knife Prty"	Purity Ring	4:29
8.	"Korea"	Trevor Jackson	4:31
9.	"Passenger" (featuring Maynard James Keenan)	Mike Shinoda	4:46
10.	"Change (In the House of Flies)"	Tourist	5:02
11.	"Pink Maggit"	Squarepusher	10:12
Total length:			50:38

== Personnel ==
Personnel adapted from album liner notes, unless otherwise noted.

Deftones

- Chino Moreno – vocals, rhythm guitar
- Stephen Carpenter – lead guitar
- Chi Cheng – bass
- Frank Delgado – keyboards, turntables
- Abe Cunningham – drums

Additional musicians

- Rodleen Getsic – additional vocals (on "Knife Prty")
- Maynard James Keenan – lead vocals (on "Passenger")
- Scott Weiland – additional vocals (on "Rx Queen"; uncredited)
- DJ Crook – programming

Artwork

- Kim Biggs – creative director
- Frank Maddocks – art direction, album design
- James Minchin III – photography

Technical personnel

- Terry Date – production, mixing
- Deftones – production
- Scott Olson – Pro Tools engineer, additional engineering
- Robert Daniels – assistant engineer (Record Plant)
- Ted Regier – assistant engineer, mixing assistance (Larrabee)
- Jason Schweitzer – assistant engineer (Larrabee)
- Howie Weinberg – mastering
- Ulrich Wild – additional engineering
- Michelle Forbes – assistant engineer

== Charts ==
=== Weekly charts ===
2000 weekly chart performance for White Pony
Chart (2000)	Peak position
Australian Albums (ARIA)	2
Austrian Albums (Ö3 Austria)	39
Belgian Albums (Ultratop Flanders)	27
Belgian Albums (Ultratop Wallonia)	145
Canadian Albums (Billboard)	8
Dutch Albums (Album Top 100)	27
Finnish Albums (Suomen virallinen lista)	13
French Albums (SNEP)	6
German Albums (Offizielle Top 100)	11
Irish Albums (IRMA)	21
Italian Albums (FIMI)	29
New Zealand Albums (RMNZ)	14
Norwegian Albums (VG-lista)	19
Scottish Albums (Official Charts)	12
Swedish Albums (Sverigetopplistan)	35
Swiss Albums (Schweizer Hitparade)	68
UK Albums (Official Charts)	13
US Billboard 200	3

2021 weekly chart performance for White Pony
Chart (2021)	Peak position
Hungarian Albums (MAHASZ)	7

2025 weekly chart performance for White Pony
Chart (2025)	Peak position
Portuguese Albums (AFP)	150

=== Year-end charts ===
Year-end chart performance for White Pony
Chart (2000)	Position
Canadian Albums (Nielsen SoundScan)	174
US Billboard 200	137

== Certifications ==
Certifications for White Pony
Region	Certification	Certified units/sales
Australia (ARIA)	Platinum	70,000^{‡}
Canada (Music Canada)	Gold	50,000^{^}
New Zealand (RMNZ)	Platinum	15,000^{‡}
United Kingdom (BPI)	Gold	132,812
United States (RIAA)	2× Platinum	2,000,000^{‡}
^{^} Shipments figures based on certification alone.^{‡} Sales+streaming figures based on certification alone.
