= Chi Cheng (musician) =

American bassist (1970–2013)

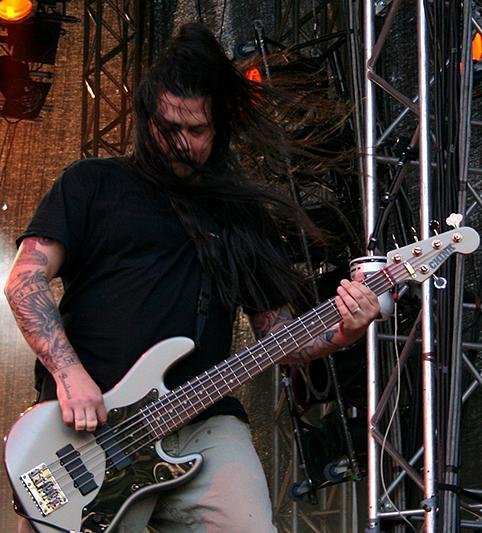
- Cheng performing with Deftones at Hultsfred Festival in June 2006

Background information
- Born: Chi Ling Dai Cheng; July 15, 1970; Stockton, California, U.S.
- Died: April 13, 2013 (aged 42) French Camp, California, U.S.
- Genres: Alternative metal; nu metal
- Occupations: Musician; poet
- Instrument: Bass
- Years active: 1988–2008
- Formerly of: Deftones

Chi Ling Dai Cheng (July 15, 1970 – April 13, 2013) was an American musician and poet, best known as the bassist and backing vocalist for the alternative metal band Deftones. He joined the band in 1990, and stayed with them until his career ended in 2008, when he was involved in a serious automobile crash in Santa Clara, California. Afterwards, he remained in a semi-comatose state before dying of cardiac arrest in April 2013. Following Cheng's hospitalization, a friend of the band, Sergio Vega, became the band's full-time bassist, having previously filled in for Cheng.

== Early life ==
Cheng was born in July 1970 in Stockton, California, to Jeanne and Yin Yan Cheng. His father, a prominent Stockton cardiologist, was a Chinese immigrant while his mother is white. Cheng graduated from Tokay High School in Lodi, California, and attended California State University, Sacramento, enrolling in 1989. He worked on campus, wrote poetry, and played with his band Deftones during the course of his education.

== Career ==
Cheng was studying English at Sacramento State when he joined Deftones. He would continue on as a poet and spoken word artist through his career with the band, often recording the spoken word with the intent for release later. He also authored an anthology of poetry titled The Bamboo Parachute, which was released as his debut and only album during his lifetime in 2000 as a spoken word album. Cheng gave proceeds from the CD to various charities and to buy musical instruments for kids in the Sacramento area. His second spoken word album, recorded in 2001, was released posthumously as The Headup Project in January 2021.

== Musical style ==
Cheng was an acclaimed bass player; however, his approach to bass in Deftones sometimes caused slight conflict. In the August 2003 edition of Bass Guitar magazine, he told writer Joel McIver: "I get a lot of grief from Stephen anyway – he says, why don't you just play along with my guitar riff? And I'm like, why don't you fuckin' piss off? Haha. He's like, can’t you just play along? ... I remember on our song 'Change (In The House Of Flies)', him and Terry Date said, oh no, you're not gonna play that goofy dub-reggae bass-line, are you? And I was like, yes, that's exactly what I'm gonna play! And then it became a really big song for us, so I was like, okay, now let me write the fuckin' way I write." In 2022, Carpenter said that he hated how Cheng would intentionally play a different tune than him "just on principle," which eventually became a common practice within the band — to merge different styles of music into Deftones. Cheng cited bassists Cliff Burton, Geezer Butler, and Steve Harris as the fundamental influences on his bass playing.

== Personal life ==
Cheng was a practicing Buddhist and maintained an interest in Taoism and shamanism. In addition to his conversion to Buddhism during his university years, he also became a vegetarian.

Cheng had one son, Gabriel Cheng, from a previous marriage.

== Car crash and coma ==
Cheng was seriously injured in an automobile crash in Santa Clara, California, on November 4, 2008, while returning from his brother's memorial service. Cheng was traveling with his sister, Mae, when their vehicle flipped three times after hitting another car travelling at 60 mph. Cheng, who was in the passenger seat, was not wearing a seat belt and was ejected from the vehicle. Mae was wearing a seatbelt and sustained minor injuries. She attended to Cheng, holding his head until two off-duty paramedics rendered aid. They were able to insert a tube into Cheng's throat to help him breathe until the ambulance arrived, an action that doctors later said helped him survive. The crash left Cheng in a coma.

In February 2009, Deftones announced that they would perform as scheduled at the Bamboozle Left music festival in April, with their friend Sergio Vega (formerly of Quicksand) filling in for Cheng on stage. Vega eventually became Cheng's full-time replacement until 2021.

The website Oneloveforchi.com was created in March to help raise funds for Cheng and his medical expenses, where fans could donate to help towards an initial target of $20,000 (later raised to $50,000, $100,000 and then again to $500,000 in 2010). Fans could also read personal blogs and comments from the Cheng family, and record a message that would be played to Cheng to further speed his recovery. In late April, PETA announced that 20% of the income from a "Happy Families, Not Happy Meals" T-shirt designed by Chi would go to the One Love for Chi foundation. There was also a "Get well soon" card on MySpace for Cheng that fans from all over the world could sign by posting comments. Fans and some rock celebrities posted comments, including Sonic Youth, Thursday, The Used, Ill Niño, and Limp Bizkit's Fred Durst.

On April 26, 2009, Cheng was readmitted to ICU following a near-fatal sepsis infection; he survived the infection following treatment and was released from ICU about a week later. Following the release, a rumor started to spread in early May that Cheng had awakened fully from his coma but this was denied on oneloveforchi.com, stating that Cheng was in a semi-conscious state. On August 18, Cheng underwent surgery to replace a bone flap in his skull that had been removed after the crash, in order to relieve intracranial pressure.

On April 27, Shepard Fairey put three signed copies of his Obama inauguration posters up for auction on eBay, with the proceeds of the auction going to the One Love for Chi Foundation.

Long-time friend Fieldy of Korn recorded an instrumental song titled "A Song for Chi". It was released for free via digital download on its official website where donations to Cheng and his family were also accepted. A few months later, in October, Răzvan Rădulescu (aka DJ Hefe) of the Romanian nu metal band Coma released a compilation album titled From Eastern Europe with Love, featuring bands from Romania, Hungary, Bulgaria, North Macedonia, and Serbia – the proceeds from the sale of the album also went to the One Love for Chi foundation.

Deftones played a two-night benefit show on November 19–20 at Avalon in Hollywood. Proceeds went to the Chi Ling Cheng Special Needs Trust. Guests included Far, Cypress Hill, Rodleen Getsic, Ben Kenney, Greg Puciato, Rick Verrett, Tommy Lee, Mike Shinoda, P.O.D., Mark McGrath, Xzibit, Robert Trujillo, Rocky George and Mike Muir (Suicidal Tendencies), Dave Lombardo, Alexi Laiho, Daron Malakian, Shavo Odadjian, John Dolmayan, and Max Cavalera.

In May 2010, Chi Cheng began showing significant signs of improvement, and was able to track individual people with his eyes, occasionally make worded responses, and slightly move his hands. Chino Moreno stated that the Cheng family would be paying a doctor with the International Brain Research Foundation who is experienced in the field of coma and trauma patients, using funds raised through the oneloveforchi website, to use an experimental medicine to bring Chi out of his coma-like state. The treatment had an 84% success rate. In May 2011, Cheng began undergoing rehabilitation and additional operations in New Jersey.

On February 7, 2012, it was reported that Cheng was in a partially conscious state, having the ability to move his legs on command; however, he was unable to move independently or speak in sentences. Two days after being released from the hospital, in June 2012, Cheng was diagnosed with pneumonia and rushed to the ICU. On July 4, Cheng was released from the ICU and continued his recovery at home.

== Death ==
On April 13, 2013, the website oneloveforchi.com reported that Cheng had died of a sudden cardiac arrest after he was rushed to a hospital. According to a statement issued by his mother, Jeanne Marie Cheng, the morning of April 13, 2013, he was taken to the emergency room of a Stockton-area (French Camp, California) hospital around 3:00 a.m. PST when Jeanne recalls that her son's "heart just suddenly stopped". Whether his condition of pneumonia (first recorded back in June 2012) was related to his death was unknown. Upon arrival, Cheng was pronounced dead. Jeanne Cheng addressed her son's fans across the world with an impromptu letter.

Our dearest Family, (April 14, 2013)

This is the hardest thing to write to you. Your love and heart and devotion to Chi was unconditional and amazing. I know that you will always remember him as a giant of a man on stage with a heart for every one of you. He was taken to the emergency room and at 3 am today his heart just suddenly stopped. He left this world with me singing songs he liked in his ear. He fought the good fight. You stood by him sending love daily. He knew that he was very loved and never alone.

With great love and "Much Respect!" Mom J (and Chi).

== Discography ==
=== Solo ===
- The Bamboo Parachute (2000)
- The Headup Project (posthumous release) (2021)

=== With Deftones ===
- Adrenaline (1995)
- Around the Fur (1997)
- White Pony (2000)
- Deftones (2003)
- Saturday Night Wrist (2006)
- Eros (Unreleased)

=== Guest appearances ===
- Live at the Fillmore by Dredg (2006)

== In popular culture ==
- Korn named a song after Chi on their 1996 album Life is Peachy. The band claim the reggae influence of the track stems from Cheng's avid influence of the genre.
- Dredg dedicated their 2009 album The Pariah, the Parrot, the Delusion to Cheng, who had previously been a special guest on Dredg's 2006 live album Live at the Fillmore.
- Far frontman Jonah Matranga has stated that the title track "At Night We Live" from their 2010 album is inspired by a dream he had shortly following a hospital visit to see Cheng.
- In November 2013 the Cheng family, friends and volunteers started a seatbelt awareness program called Buckle Up For Chi, with the goal of raising seatbelt awareness and usage.
