= James Drescher =

American singer (born 1965)

- Performing with Murphy's Law in 2007

Background information
- Also known as: Jimmy G, Jimmy Spliff
- Born: James Drescher; August 12, 1965 (age 61); United States
- Genres: Punk rock
- Occupation: Singer

James Drescher (born August 12, 1965), better known as Jimmy G, Jimmy Gestapo or Jimmy Spliff, is the lead singer for New York based hardcore punk band Murphy's Law. He has been referred to as one of New York Hardcore's most influential figures.

== Early life ==
James Drescher was born on August, 12, 1965, in Astoria, Queens and grew up in the area. He is of German and Polish ancestry from his father's side along with Italian and Slovak from his mother's side. Growing up he quickly became interested in music as his mother would often play classic rock music such as Elvis Presley.

He would also spend a lot of time in the Lower East Side where his grandmother lived. During his time there he was first introduced to punk and hardcore music.

Drescher got the nickname "Gestapo" in 7th grade while playing in a band called Kraut. In an interview he stated:

the guy playing the drums was Johnny Feedback… and I was like, what the hell is this? And he was like: "You need a name, a punkrock name! You know, like Sid Vicious or Johnny Rotten, a bad name!" – and we said: "what goes with Jimmy? Jimmy Bad Guy, Jimmy Puke, Jimmy Stupid, Jimmy Crazy, Jimmy Gestapo…" and I was like: "Whoa, Jimmy Gestapo, that's a really bad name

At the age of 15 he got a job working the door and as a DJ at the A7 Club in New York City.

== Career ==
Murphy's Law is an American hardcore band from New York City, New York, formed in 1982. While vocalist Jimmy Drescher remains the only remaining original member of the band. the line-up has consisted of former members of bands such as Skinnerbox, Danzig, The Bouncing Souls, Mucky Pup, Dog Eat Dog, Hanoi Rocks, Agnostic Front, Warzone, Cro-Mags, and D Generation. His lyrical themes touch upon humorous topics and party life he once stated "Most of the good stuff is written by other people, but the dumb, funny shit is written by me." He has cited Jesse Malin as one of his biggest song writing influences.

Over the course of their career, Murphy's Law have released five full-length albums, the last of which was released in 2001. Countless singles and covers have been recorded throughout the band's career which are listed on their website. The group have also gone through multiple lineup changes but Drescher has kept the band going for 40+ years. Murphy's Law have been touring Japan, Europe and the US for years despite lack of record label support. After not releasing any music since 2001, their first new song in 24 years, "Go, Jimmy, Go!", was released digitally as a single in October 2025.

Drescher and Murphy's Law also host the annual concert dubbed the Jimmy J birthday boat bash on his birthday on August 12.

In 1986 Drescher appeared on The Phil Donahue Show along with other members of the NYC hardcore punk scene, where he discussed the scene's community and defending its positive aspects against media stereotypes.

In 1989 he provided backing vocals for The Mighty Mighty Bosstones album Devil's Night Out he later performed with the band live on August 21, 2018, in celebration of the albums 30 anniversary.

Drescher who has many tattoos himself opened up his own tattoo shop in New York alongside Vinnie Stigma of Agnostic Front called the NYHC Tattoo shop in 1999.

Drescher appeared in the 1990 film Blue Steel where he played punk #2. Drescher and the rest of Murphy's Law appeared in the 2002 film Cremaster 3. He also appears in the video game Grand Theft Auto IV as the voice of Liberty City Hardcore (L.C.H.C) radio station's DJ. Drescher appeared in the 1999 film N.Y.H.C. which is about the mid-1990s New York hardcore scene, and the 2017 Agnostic Front documentary The Godfathers of Hardcore.

Drescher in 2024

In 2018, he was hospitalized and underwent surgery to remove his gallbladder. The Mighty Mighty Bosstones, Sheer Terror, Killing Time held a concert to raise funds for his medical bills. There was also a GoFundMe campaign on his behalf. Following his recovery he began touring with Murphy's Law again in 2019.

On May 4, 2023, Drescher along with various friends were celebrating the one year anniversary of the death of musician Howie Pyro. During the celebration, Pyro's former D Generation bandmate Jesse Malin suffered a rare spinal cord stroke that left him paralyzed from the waist down. Drescher carried Malin from the restaurant into a nearby apartment from where he was taken to Mount Sinai Hospital.

== Views on music ==
Unlike many of his New York hardcore contemporaries, Drescher does not touch upon politics or religion in his lyrics, instead opting for more comedic and light hearted songs. In a 2026 interview he stated:

With Murphy's Law, I don't get involved in the politics. Politics separates people, religion separates people, and I don't like people separate. I like people together. I'm all about singing dumb, ignorant, fun songs about silly shit and making people laugh and forget; hopefully forget about politics for the hour I'm up there and forget about their problems and forget about what's on TV and forget about their parents or their divorce or death or whatever. I want to be a positive, fun influence to somebody where they could come in for an hour and go, "Holy shit, I forgot about everything. I just had a great time, wow, this is great."

== Personal life ==
Drescher still resides in Astoria, Queens where he spent his childhood. Outside of music he builds motorcycles, does carpentry and welds. He also competes in motorcycle racing.

== Discography ==
=== Murphy's law ===
- Bong Blast (1983) Spliff Records
- Murphy's Law (1986) Profile Records
- Back with a Bong! (1989) Profile Records
- The Best of Times (1991) Relativity Records
- Dedicated (1996) Another Planet
- The Party's Over (2001) Artemis Records

=== Guest appearances ===
- The Mighty Mighty Bosstones — "A Little Bit Ugly" (backing vocals)
- D Generation — D Generation (backing vocals)
- Agnostic Front — Something's Gotta Give (backing vocals)
- Skarhead – Kings At Crime (backing vocals)
- Last Hope – "In Your Face"
- Cheech - "Pint Of The Black Stuff"
- Murderer's Row – Beer Fueled Mayhem (backing vocals)
- Stigma – New York Blood (backing vocals)

== Filmography ==
=== Films ===
Year	Work	Role	Note
1988	Tougher Than Leather	Himself (Cameo Appearance)	Acting debut
1990	Blue Steel	Punk #2	
1999	N.Y.H.C.	Himself	Documentary
2002	Cremaster 3	Himself (Murphy's Law Vocalist)	
2006	Dropped	Himself	TV movie
2008	MotherFucker: A Movie	Himself	
2017	The Godfathers of Hardcore	Himself	Documentary

=== Video games ===
Year	Work	Role
2003	Backyard Wrestling: Don't Try This At Home	Template Character
2008	Grand Theft Auto IV	Voice of Liberty City Hardcore
