= D Generation (disambiguation) =

D Generation is a glam punk band from New York City.

D Generation may also refer to:

- The D-Generation, an Australian sketch comedy show
- D/Generation, a 1991 video game
- D-Generation X a wrestling stable
- D Generation (album), the self-titled debut album by D Generation
