= Thirty Six Hours Later =

Studio album by The Chelsea Smiles
- Released: November 7, 2006
- Genre: Hard rock, punk rock
- Label: Acetate Records (USA); People Like You (Europe)

Thirty Six Hours Later is the debut full-length release by hard rock band The Chelsea Smiles. It was released on November 7, 2006 via Acetate Records in the United States and released by People Like You... Records in Europe.

Most of the tracks are written by former D Generation guitarist Todd Youth, though some of them were co-written with Christian Martucci including "Nothing Wrong", "Feelin' to Kill" and "Alright, Alright". "Heart Attack", The Single from Thirty Six Hours Later, was a Todd Youth/Skye Vaughan-Jayne co-write. The album also features a cover of New York Dolls track "Chatterbox".

Zero Magazine's Jim Kaz reviewed the album saying "tracks ... pack serious punch, and are loaded with infectious hooks and raunchy, old-school guitar bits. Unfortunately, the album’s sound quality is a bit tinny, hampering what would otherwise be a full-on, dirty-rock assault".

The album was produced by former Adam Ant bassist Bruce Witkin.

== Track listing ==
All songs written by Todd Youth, except where noted.

1. "Nothing Wrong" (Christian Martucci, Youth) - 2:38
2. "I Want More" - 3:04
3. "Heart Attack" (Skye Vaughan-Jayne, Youth) - 2:17
4. "Nothing to Lose" - 2:34
5. "Pillbox" (Jeff Drake)- 2:26
6. "Alright, Alright" (Martucci, Youth) - 2:34
7. "News for You" (Dan Rispler, Youth) - 2:43
8. "You Can't Give Me Anything" - 3:41
9. "Built to Last" - 2:16
10. "Something's Gotta Give" - 2:16
11. "Chatterbox" (Johnny Thunders) - 2:12
12. "Feelin' to Kill" (Martucci, Rispler, Youth) - 3:53

== Credits ==
- Skye Vaughan-Jayne - lead vocals, guitar
- Todd Youth - vocals, guitar
- Johnny Martin - bass, vocals
- Karl "Rockfist" Rosqvist - drums
- Bruce Witkin - producer
