= Todd Youth =

American guitarist (1971–2018)

Todd Schofield
- Also known as: Todd Youth; Tarun Krishna Das
- Born: May 15, 1971; Rockaway, New Jersey, U.S.
- Died: October 27, 2018 (aged 47)
- Genres: Hardcore punk; punk rock; heavy metal
- Occupation: Guitarist
- Years active: 1984–2018
- Formerly of: Warzone; Murphy's Law; Danzig; Cro-Mags; The Chelsea Smiles; Son of Sam; Samhain; Chrome Locust; D Generation; The Homewreckers; Agnostic Front; Bloodclot; The Joneses; Fireburn

Todd Schofield (May 15, 1970 – October 27, 2018), known as Todd Youth, was an American guitarist, best known for his work with Warzone, Murphy's Law and Danzig.

== Biography ==
Starting in 6th grade, Todd began sneak out from home into New York City where he was playing in several New York hardcore bands, leading to the nickname, Youth (given by HR from Bad Brains). He received his first bass guitar, a BC Rich, for his 10th birthday in 1981. Early influences included Black Sabbath and Kiss. He is mentioned as being the bass player in a very early Agnostic Front as well as Cro-Mags line-up, alongside Harley Flanagan on drums, Parris Mayhew on guitar, and Eric Casanova on vocals. Youth also played for New York City act Warzone until around 1986. He joined Murphy's Law that year, recording on various works with them, including three full-length albums. Youth performed with Murphy's Law until 1995.

After leaving Murphy's Law, he recorded a single with a band named The Homewreckers in 1996. Around this time Youth evolved his style from hardcore to implementing some of his 1970s punk influences, such as New York Dolls, Dead Boys and The Heartbreakers, thus he joined famous New York City glam punk band D Generation, replacing Richard Bacchus on guitar. He was with D Generation from 1996 to 1998 and recorded on their album Through The Darkness, and Youth co-wrote the track "Sunday Secret Saints" with Jesse Malin.

Chrome Locust was formed by Youth, D Generation drummer Michael Wildwood, and Vásquez bassist Jim Heneghan in 1998. In May 1999, Chrome Locust released a self-titled album on Tee Pee Records. The cover art was reminiscent of The Age of Quarrel by Cro-Mags. In a late interview, Youth stated that The Age of Quarrel was one of the best hardcore records ever released. Youth disbanded Chrome Locust in order to audition for Danzig, despite having a potential offer to tour with The Hellacopters.

=== Playing with Danzig and Samhain ===
During the summer of 1999, he joined Danzig as the guitarist. Coincidentally, former D Generation bandmate, bassist Howie Pyro, joined Danzig soon after. The same year Glenn Danzig had reformed his horror punk band Samhain, which he joined as guitarist.

Youth only had three months to practice and learn the Samhain and Danzig sets. The band AFI had toured with Samhain during 1999, and their frontman Davey Havok was a longtime fan, so in 2000 Youth masterminded horror punk band Son of Sam.

This featured Davey Havok on vocals and on their album Songs from the Earth with guest appearances from Glenn Danzig.

With Danzig, Youth recorded the studio album, I Luciferi, released in 2002, which featured Glenn Danzig, Howie Pyro and future Queens of the Stone Age drummer Joey Castillo. Todd's guitar work was also included on the live album, Live on the Black Hand Side, released in 2001 and the compilation record, The Lost Tracks of Danzig, released in 2007. Youth left the group in 2003 but kept in contact with Glenn Danzig through the years. He rejoined Danzig in 2007 for the Halloween Tour. He left Danzig again, to join Glen Campbell's band.

=== Later years ===
Youth also played with Motörhead in May 2003, filling in for three dates on Motörhead's tour of the United States.

Youth led Los Angeles rockers The Chelsea Smiles, which in some ways marked a return to the style of music Youth played with D Generation, with the band implementing similar influences, such as The Stooges, New York Dolls, MC5 and Chuck Berry. They released their debut EP Nowhere Ride in 2005. The debut full-length Chelsea Smiles album Thirty Six Hours Later was released in November 2006, and its European release date was early December of the same year.

The Chelsea Smiles were invited by Social Distortion to open for them in 2006. The Chelsea Smiles later toured Europe in 2007.

In 2008, Youth reformed the band, Son of Sam, but Davey Havok did not return on vocals. As with the first Son of Sam release, all of the music was written by Youth.

2008 and 2009 also saw Youth joining singer Glen Campbell's band. Youth recorded three songs on Glen's comeback record Meet Glen Campbell. Youth did various TV show appearances (Jimmy Kimmel, The Tonight Show) and toured the UK in support of the release.

In 2009, the Chelsea Smiles released a new, self-titled release. The band undertook a short UK tour with horror punk artist Wednesday 13, in support of the release. At the end of 2009, the Chelsea Smiles decided the end had come for the band and changed the name to the Royal Highness.

Youth began writing with Wednesday 13 with plans to record an album under the band name Gunfire 76. The band had more of a rock sound than Wednesday 13.

Youth joined Cheap Trick performing the "Sgt. Pepper Live" show at the Las Vegas Hilton in September 2009. He appeared on Cheap Trick's album, The Latest with the blessing of guitarist, Rick Nielsen. During an interview, Youth recalled Nielsen calling him a member of the New Jersey Dolls, as a reference to his former band, D Generation.

In January 2010 Youth was announced as the second guitarist with Michael Monroe during a press conference held in Los Angeles. The band also featured Sam Yaffa on bass, guitarist, Ginger, from The Wildhearts, and Jimmy Clarke on drums. Youth's tenure with Michael Monroe was cut short due to issues with band management as well as an offer to audition and tour with his childhood hero, Ace Frehley. Youth did not confirm that he had left Monroe's band until the end of March 2010.

By the end of March 2010, Youth was confirmed as the permanent touring guitarist with ex-Kiss guitarist Ace Frehley. Youth stated that Ace did not require rehearsal before performing in concert, quoting Ace as saying, "Eh, you know the songs, right?" Youth fit in well with Ace's band and often took center stage to sing the classic Kiss song, "Flaming Youth." He was also featured with the rest of the band in the photos section of Frehley's book, No Regrets. Youth worked with Frehley for roughly four years.

At the end of 2010, Youth toured with Jesse Malin and the St. Mark's Social. In 2010, the first single "American Dream" was released on One Voice by Capricorn, a band formed by Youth, Phil Caivano (of Monster Magnet) and Karl Rosqvist (of The Chelsea Smiles and Michael Monroe).

Youth played several shows as the lead guitarist for The Joneses in 2015 and by 2017 he returned to his hardcore roots when joining hardcore punk supergroup, Bloodclot. On July 14, 2017, Bloodclot released a record entitled Up in Arms. Along with Youth, the band also featured vocalist John Joseph (Cro-Mags), Nick Oliveri (Dwarves) and Joey Castillo (Danzig). The band toured with Negative Approach in the US and planned on touring the UK in 2018, but split up before doing so. Youth cited differences in opinion regarding band matters with Joseph.

On August 18, 2017, Youth played his first show with his new band Fireburn. A hardcore punk band that features Israel Joseph I (formerly of Bad Brains), Nick Townsend (currently/formerly of Deadbeat, Knife Fight), and Todd Jones (currently/formerly of Nails, Terror).

They released their first EP on Closed Casket Activities titled Don't Stop the Youth.

On October 1, 2017, Youth held a tribute to his former Warzone bandmate, Raymond Barbieri AKA Raybeez, on the 20th anniversary of his death, at Tompkins Square Park in NYC. Many hardcore contemporaries took part in this tribute alongside Youth.

=== Death ===
Youth died on October 27, 2018, at the age of 47.

A memorial was held for Youth in California on November 4, 2018, at the Velvet Margarita Cantina and another was held in New York at Niagara (formerly A7) on November 8, 2018. The memorials featured musicians and friends from the hardcore scene and bands he had worked with, playing and speaking in his honor. H.R. and Dr. Know from Youth's favorite band, Bad Brains, performed at the New York memorial. H.R. is also featured on the song "Todd Youth", a tribute his D Generation bandmate Jesse Malin released in 2020.

Some of Youth's ashes were placed at the Hare Krishna Tree in Tompkins Square Park on the night of the New York memorial. The remaining ashes were spread, per his wishes, in the holy Yamuna River in India.

== Discography ==
This discography documents the recordings Todd Youth played on during his time with the various bands that he was a part of, throughout his musical career.

=== With Murphy's Law ===
- Back with a Bong (1989)
- The Best of Times (1991)
- Dedicated (1996)
- Monster Mash (single, 1991)
- Good for Now (EP, 1993)
- "My Woman from Tokyo" (single, 1995)
- Dedicated (1996)

=== With The Homewreckers ===
- "I Want More" (single, 1996)

=== With D Generation ===
- Prohibition (EP, 1998)
- "Helpless" (single, 1998)
- Through the Darkness (1999)

=== With Chrome Locust ===
- Chrome Locust (1999)

=== With Son of Sam ===
- Songs from the Earth (2000)
- Into the Night (2008)

=== With Danzig ===
- Live on the Black Hand Side (2001)
- I Luciferi (2002)
- The Lost Tracks of Danzig (2007)

=== With The Chelsea Smiles ===
- Nowhere Ride (EP, 2005)
- Thirty Six Hours Later (2006)
- The Chelsea Smiles (2009)

=== With Glen Campbell ===
- Meet Glen Campbell (2008)
- Greatest Hits (2009)

=== With Cheap Trick ===
- The Latest (2009)

=== With Jesse Malin and the St. Mark's Social ===
- Love it to Life (2010)

=== With Bloodclot ===
- Up in Arms (2017)

=== With Fireburn ===
- Don't Stop the Youth (EP, 2017)
- "Shine" (single, 2018)

== Filmography ==
- American Hardcore (2006)
- Kiss Loves You (2007)
