= Dedicated (Murphy's Law album) =

Studio album by Murphy's Law
- Released: March 19, 1996
- Recorded: 1995
- Studios: Spa, New York City, U.S.
- Genre: Hardcore punk
- Length: 23:40
- Label: Another Planet
- Producer: Daniel Rey

Murphy's Law chronology
Good for Now (1993)	Dedicated (1996)	The Party's Over (2001)

Dedicated is a full-length album by the New York City hardcore punk band Murphy's Law. It was released by Another Planet in 1996.

== Production and background ==
The album was produced by Daniel Rey. He also wrote "Green Bud".

The personnel differed from previous recordings, but Jimmy G Drescher's vocals still provided the sound's basis.

The label had already picked up the rights to their previous material from Profile Records and in 1994 had released a split CD with the self-titled and Back with a Bong!albums on the same disc. Dedicated was produced by Daniel Rey, who also wrote "Greenbud" on the album. It follows 1993's Good for Now EP and the 1991 studio album The Best of Times. Dedicated was dedicated to former bass player, Chuck Valle, who was killed in a knife related incident in 1994. His picture appears on the back page of the CD inlay and a picture of a tattoo inscribed with the words "In Memory of Chuck" appears on the jewel case inlay.

The group toured in the US and Europe in support of the album.

== Critical reception ==
Professional ratings
Review scores
Source	Rating
AllMusic	3/5 stars
The Encyclopedia of Popular Music	3/5 stars

The Washington Post wrote, "There's no evidence that the Law's energy is flagging; Todd Youth's guitar churns as fast as ever, and Jimmy G's vocals are just as raw and urgent. Still, the concept is a little tired."

AllMusic stated, "Dedicated is another collection of Murphy's Law's weed-obsessed, couch potato punk anthems like 'Greenbud' and 'Bag of Snacks'. The catchier selections, like 'Dysfunctional Family', make the album worthwhile, and longtime fans should be pleased."

== Track listing ==
- All songs written by Murphy's Law, unless stated
1. "Don't Bother Me" – 1:39
2. "Sarasota" – 2:32
3. "Dysfunctional Family" – 1:46
4. "Shut Up" – 1:59
5. "The Plan" – 1:35
6. "Bitter" – 1:40
7. "Greenbud" (Daniel Rey) – 2:26
8. "What Will the Neighbors Think?" – 2:49
9. "Bag of Snacks" – 2:06
10. "Still Smokin'" – 2:42
11. "Stay Gold" – 2:27

== Personnel ==
- Jimmy "G" Drescher – vocals
- Todd "Youth" Schofield – guitar, backing vocals
- Dean Rispler – bass guitar
- Eric "Goat" Arce – drums
- Seaton "Raven" Handcock – saxophone
- Jesse Malin – background vocals on "What Will the Neighbors Think?"
- Recorded at Spa Studio, New York City
- Produced by Daniel Rey
- Engineered by Hillary Johnson
- Assistant engineered by Patrick Shroads
- Mastered by Alan Douches at West West Side Music
