= Through the Darkness =

Through the Darkness may refer to:

- Through the Darkness (album), a 1999 studio album by D Generation
- Through the Darkness (novel), a 2001 novel by Harry Turtledove
- Through the Darkness (TV series), a 2022 South Korean television series

== See also ==
- Through the Dark (disambiguation)
