= Danny Sage =

- Born: April 7, 1965 (age 61); New York City, US
- Origin: United States
- Genres: Rock & Roll
- Years active: 1979–present
- Member of: D Generation

Danny Sage (born April 7, 1965, in New York City, New York) is an American singer, songwriter, guitarist, and producer. He is most recognised for having played lead guitar in American rock n roll band D Generation.

== Biography ==
Sage started playing guitar as a child, and quickly formed a band at the age of 14 called The Possessed, which performed in many New York City clubs in the early 1980s, their first show being one of the final nights at Max's Kansas City. Their last show was at the legendary NYC hardcore venue, A7, in the winter of 1981. He then joined Heart Attack, and appeared on their 1983 album, “Keep Your Distance”. In 1990, Sage began to assemble a band that would later become D Generation. D Generation has recorded 5 albums (only four were ever released, one for EMI, two for Columbia/Sony, and one for Bastard Basement) and the band toured extensively in the 1990s, and again 2011–2018. Sage has also guested with performers such as Debbie Harry, Ronnie Spector, Joey Ramone, Leonard Graves Phillips, and former bandmate Jesse Malin. In 2002, Sage recorded his first solo album in Los Angeles, but it remains unreleased. He also recorded a 2007 UK tour-only promotional ep "Don't Look Down". Sage also produced the 2016 D Generation album “Nothing Is Anywhere”.
