= Jimmy G (disambiguation) =

Jimmy G may refer to:

- Jimmy Garoppolo, American football quarterback for the San Francisco 49ers
- Jimmy Gestapo, lead singer of hardcore punk band Murphy's Law
- Jimmy Graham, American football tight end for the Chicago Bears
