= The Godfathers of Hardcore =

Hardcore music documentary

- Directed by: Ian McFarland
- Starring: Roger Miret; Vinnie Stigma; Agnostic Front
- Distributed by: Bridge Nine Records
- Release date: November 11, 2017
- Running time: 95 minutes
- Country: United States
- Language: English
- Budget: $15,000-38,000 (estimated)

The Godfathers of Hardcore is a 2017 American documentary film about the hardcore band Agnostic Front mainly focusing on the bands two longest tenured members vocalist Roger Miret and guitarist Vinnie Stigma It was directed by Ian McFarland.

== Synopsis ==
The documentary mostly centers around Agnostic Front's two longest tenured members Roger Miret and Vinnie Stigma. The film starts off by going over both the bands early years along with Stigma and Miret's individual experiences and hardships during that period. It then goes over Agnostic Front's rise in fame, impact on the hardcore genre along with jumping back and forth with current events around the time of the documentary's recording. Besides music the film also dives into the pairs personal lives, struggles along with showing Miret and Stigma's "unbreakable" relationship throughout the years. In addition the film contains lots of vintage concert footage. The film ends with both Miret and Stigma back on tour playing in front of a live crowd. The film does not use much of the bands music itself instead opting for more instrumental music that gives off a "sad" and "ominous" tones.

Additionally the film features interviews from members of other New York hardcore bands such as Sick of It All, Murphy's Law, and Madball.

== Cast ==
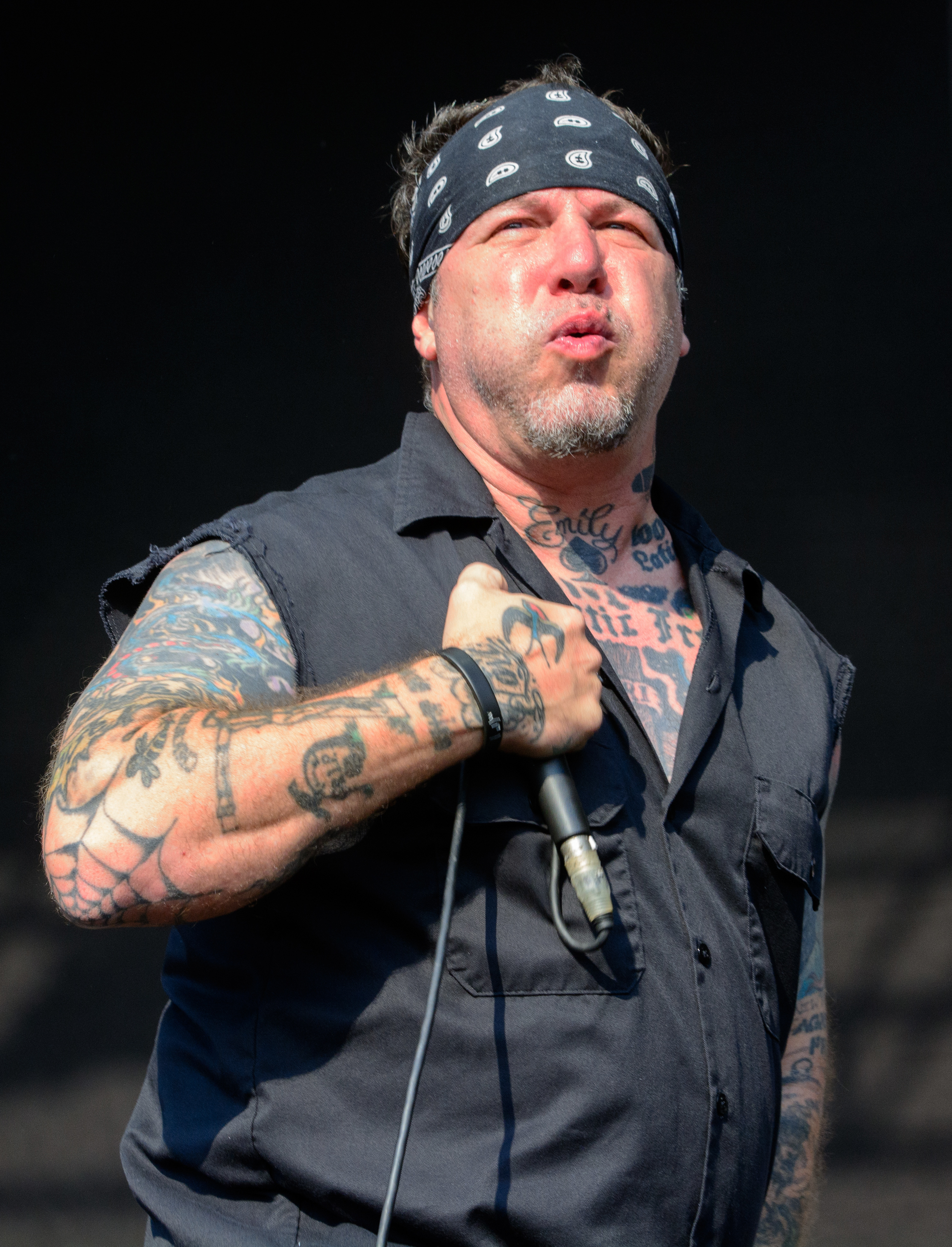
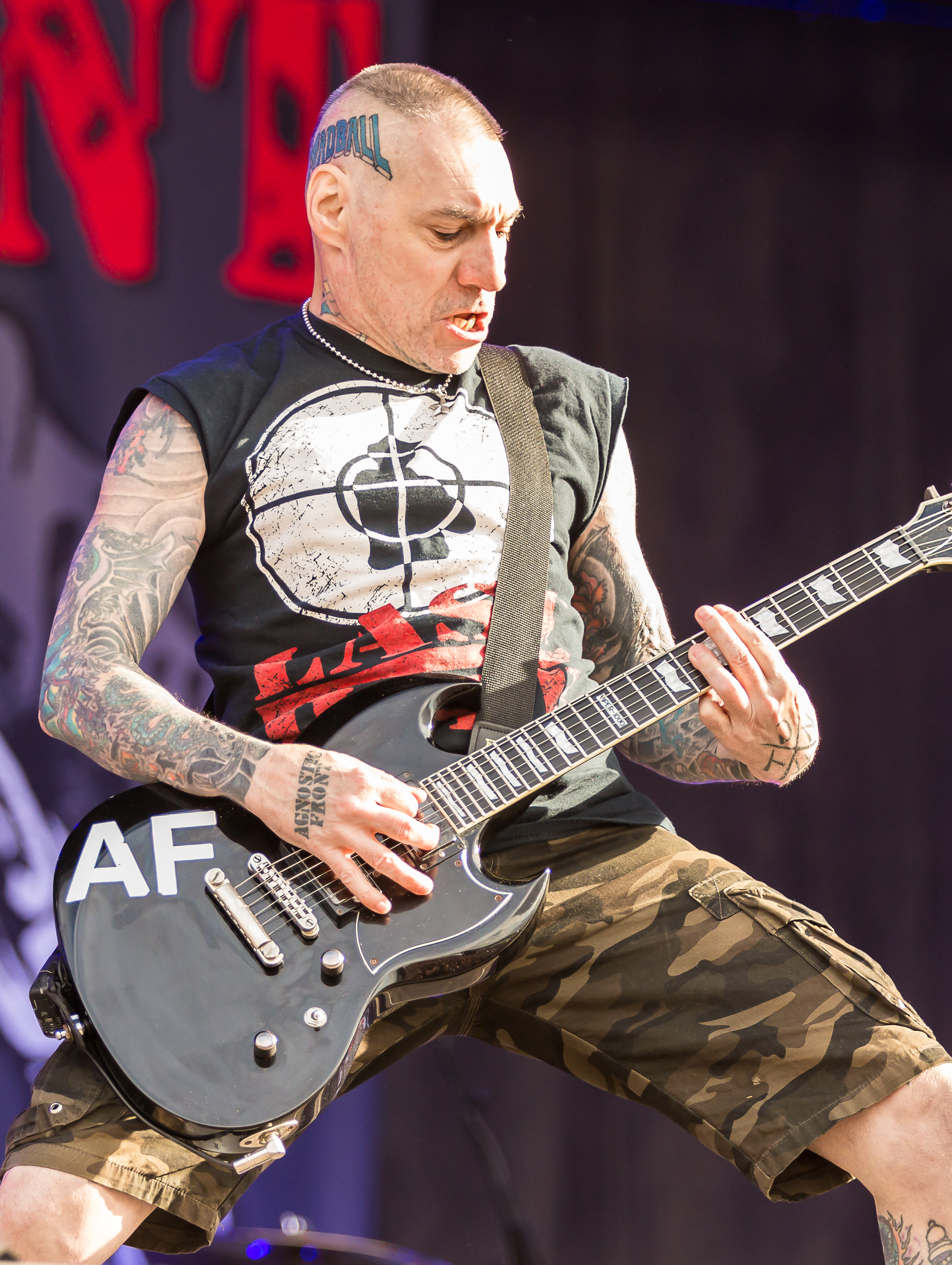
Roger Miret and Vinnie Stigma are the two band members the documentary focuses on

Band members

- Vinnie Stigma
- Roger Miret
- Mike Gallo
- Craig Silverman
- Pokey Mo

Other musicians and appearances

- Freddy Cricien
- James Drescher
- Joseph Cuz Cammarata
- Jimmy Colletti
- Christopher Fisher
- Harley Flanagan
- Rick Frisiello

Producers

- Ian McFarland — director
- Mike Pecci — executive producer
- Scott Keys — executive producer
- Skip Williamson — producers
- Tony Fernandez — co producer
- Jeff Castelaz — co producer
- Aaron Drake — composer
- Jay Reason — graphic designer & webmaster
- Nathan Bice — mix engineer
- Mark Valentine — trailer editor

== Production and Release ==
In 2015 Agnostic Front announced that a documentary on the band's history is in the works. In April of that same year a kickstarter was started by the films director Ian McFarland to help create the documentary with a goal of $15,000, $38,000+ ended up being raised for the project. Around this time the film started to officially go into production.

After two plus years of production an official trailer was released on November 8, 2017. Then just 3 days later on November 11, The Godfathers of Hardcore received its world premiere At the DOC NYC Festival. The film was not shown at festival again till February 18, of 2018 it was then shown to additional 23 film festivals all over the world with its last being at the Musikfilm Festivalen in Denmark on September 15, 2019. The film later released on Blu-Ray Via Bridge Nine Records On November 15, 2019. The film later aired on Showtime on December 12 of that year.

== Reception ==
The Godfathers of Hardcore received positive reception from multiple publications.

Forbes stated "The documentary is a profound and heartfelt look at the community centered around hardcore, but more specifically the brotherhood between Agnostic Front members Vinnie Stigma and Roger Miret. What's most captivating about the story in TGFOH, is its mainstream and relatable charm; it's not a film strictly for hardcore music fans. As the film's director Ian McFarland points out, 85% of the film is scored music, much to what a feature film or nonmusical related documentary renders. The film presents not only a brilliant piece of filmmaking, but one of the best and greatest achievements in the hardcore music scene; a push towards mainstream."

Rolling Stone wrote "Godfathers acts as a dynamic, crucial companion piece to American hardcore."

The Hollywood Reporter added "McFarland films the band in an unobtrusive and unshowy style. That said, the contemporary material is handsomely shot and smoothly edited, with an agreeably dreamy tone and some quietly poetic visual flourishes. Surprisingly, Aaron Drake's prominently deployed electronic score is plaintive and subtle, the polar opposite of the ear-bashing, chest-thumping, testosterone-pumped genre that the doc notionally celebrates." "It is genuinely touching to see how McFarland so obviously adores Agnostic Front and their raucous old-school racket, but he never quite persuades us why we should, too."

=== Awards ===
Year	Award	Category	Result
2018	IFF Boston	Documentary Feature	Won
