= Mercury Retrograde =

Live album by Jesse Malin
- Released: June 3, 2008 (download-only); November 10, 2008
- Recorded: Mercury Lounge, December 2007
- Genre: Indie rock
- Length: 1:12:17
- Labels: Adeline Records; One Little Indian
- Producer: Paul Hager

Jesse Malin chronology
On Your Sleeve (2008)	Mercury Retrograde (2008)	Love It to Life (2010)

Mercury Retrograde is a live album by Jesse Malin, recorded at the Mercury Lounge, New York City in December 2007. The album was originally only released online, on June 3, 2008, and was released on CD on November 10, 2008. On the CD released by One Little Indian, the first thirteen tracks are from the live set, and the final five tracks are studio recordings. The version of the CD released by Adeline Records contains fifteen live songs plus one studio recording unique to this version.

== Track listings ==
=== One Little Indian Records ===
1. "High Lonesome" 4:08
2. "Wendy" 4:21
3. "Hotel Columbia" 3:26
4. "Lucinda" 2:46
5. "Subway" 4:11
6. "Cigarettes & Violets" 4:14
7. "Since You're in Love" 4:21
8. "Helpless" 3:34
9. "Aftermath" 6:10
10. "Broken Radio" 6:40
11. "Going Out West" 3:48
12. "Swingin' Man" 5:30
13. "Xmas" 3:29
14. "Leaving Babylon" 4:08
15. "Megan Don't Know" 2:46
16. "It's Not Enough" 1:16
17. "Lady from Baltimore" 2:53
18. "Fairytale of New York" 4:47

=== Adeline Records ===
1. "High Lonesome" 4:08
2. "Wendy" 4:21
3. "Hotel Columbia" 3:26
4. "Lucinda" 2:46
5. "Subway" 4:11
6. "Cigarettes & Violets" 4:14
7. "Little Star"
8. "Since You're in Love" 4:21
9. "Helpless" 3:34
10. "Aftermath" 6:10
11. "Black Haired Girl"
12. "Broken Radio" 6:40
13. "Going Out West" 3:48
14. "Swingin' Man" 5:30
15. "Xmas" 3:29
16. "Christmas (Baby Please Come Home)" [Studio Recording]
