= Urban Waste (band) =

American hardcore punk band

Urban Waste is a New York hardcore punk band from Ravenswood Queens that was part of the New York renaissance of hardcore punk in the early 1980s. Much more raw, visceral, and overtly confrontational than their New York punk predecessors, they were contemporaries of Reagan Youth (of which bass player Andy Apathy was an early member), the earliest incarnation of the Beastie Boys, and Bad Brains. They belonged to a group of bands coming out of the borough of Queens that included Kraut, Gilligan's Revenge (later called Token Entry), Murphy's Law, and The Mob. The band, like many others of the era, was short-lived, and after the breakup several members went on to form Major Conflict.

== Recordings ==
Their only recorded material was an eight-song 7", which was released in 1982 on Mob Style Records, the record label of fellow hardcore band The Mob (and later as a 12" on Big City Records). The Urban Waste EP has been released by the New York City label Mad at the World Records in its series of New York hardcore reissues from the early 1980s. The EP was also reissued in digital format by the New York-based digital label Anthology Recordings.

Roger Miret, lead vocalist for New York hardcore legends Agnostic Front, reportedly cited Urban Waste as the band that got him into hardcore, and has mentioned the group as being one of his favorites of the early NYHC scene.

== Tours ==
In 2002 Urban Waste played CBGB's for a 20-year reunion, and record release party for "reissue" of the 82' E.P. This short lived fun experience ended a few months later.

The band re-grouped again in 2008, playing infrequent shows, and released "Recycled" in 2010. This was a compilation of unreleased songs and a few new songs written in this time period.

2012 was the strongest year for the band to date, as far as playing out, and writing new material. This is also the first time in the band's career that they have gone overseas, playing Europe in Venlo, The Netherlands on September 22, 2012.

== Discography ==
- Urban Waste 7" ep (Mob Style Records, 1982)
- Urban Waste 12"ep reissue (Big City Records)
- Urban Waste CD ep bootleg (Lost and Found Records)
- Urban Waste 12" ep reissue (Mad at the World Records, 2003)
- Urban Waste CD ep reissue (Hungry Eye/ Mad at the World Records, 2003)
- Urban Waste Recycled LP (Rebel Sound Records 2010)
- URBAN WASTE Recycled CD (Nicotine Records - Euro Release 2011)
- Urban Waste 82' E.P. 7" Vinyl (Way back when Records and Even Worse Records 2012)
- Urban Waste 2014 7" Split with The Nasty, Notox, Red Tape
- Urban Waste Waste x Crew ep 2015
- Urban Waste More Wasted Years cd 2021
- Urban Waste More Wasted Years Vinyl 2022
- Urban Waste "NYHC Document 1981-1983" 2022
- Urban Waste What Else Is New? Vinyl 2023
- Urban Waste Locked In The Basement cassette 2023

== Members ==
- Josh Waste - vocals 2010–Present
- Johnny Waste - guitar 1981–Present
- Logan Knowles - bass 2026–Present
- Stooley Kutchakokov - drums 2015–Present

== Past members ==
Vocals

- Billy Phillips (Major Conflict) 1981 - 1982
- Kenny "Waste" Ahrens 1982 - 2011
- Zac Stough 2002 and 2011, Early 2012

Bass

- Freddie Watt 1981 - 1982
- Andy Apathy (Reagan Youth) 1982 - 1984
- A.J. Ricci 2002,2011- Early 2013
- Phil Kinkel 2008-2009
- Sammy Ahmed 2009
- Paul Bakija (Reagan Youth) 2009
- Sonny Baron 2009 - 2011
- A.J. Ricci 2012-2013
- Nonlee Saito- 2012-2020
- Vinny Carriero- 2020-2023
- Andrew Drizzle 2023-2026

Drums

- John Dancy 1981 - 2010
- Jimmy Duke (SQNS, Ultra Violence, Iconicide) 2010 - 2014
