= Freaktown (disambiguation) =

The name Freaktown may refer to:

- Freaktown (TV series), a Canadian cartoon
- "Freaktown", a song from the 1991 Murphy's Law album The Best of Times
- "Freaktown", a song from the 2003 Britny Fox album Springhead Motorshark

== See also ==
- Freak (disambiguation)
- "Freaks in Town"
