= Back with a Bong! =

Studio album by Murphy's Law
- Released: 1989
- Recorded: 1988
- Studios: Dreamland (New York City, New York); Chung King (New York City, New York)
- Genres: Hardcore punk, crossover thrash
- Length: 29:21
- Labels: Profile; Another Planet 1994 reissue
- Producer: Murphy's Law

Murphy's Law chronology
Murphy's Law (1986)	Back with a Bong! (1989)	The Best of Times (1991)

Re-issue cover
- 1994 Another Planet re-issue – with Murphy's Law on same disc

Professional ratings
Review scores
Source	Rating
Allmusic	3/5 stars

Back with a Bong! is the second album by American hardcore punk band Murphy's Law. It was released in 1989 on Profile Records and subsequently re-released on Another Planet Records in 1994 with the previous self-titled album on the same disc.

Jimmy Gestapo was the only remaining member from the previous lineup. Alex Morris had been replaced on guitar by Todd Youth (Agnostic Front and Warzone). Chuck Valle replaced Pete Martinez on bass, and Doug E. Beans took over drumming duties from Petey Hines.

== Overview ==
Back with a Bong! seen Murphy's Law add ska to their musical style, an influence which came from their touring with Fishbone who also appear on the record. The album also seen the band get exposed to a wider audience due to the music video for "Panty Raid" receiving play time on MTV's Headbangers Ball.

The album produced many of the bands live staples such as "Panty Raid," "Quest for Herb," and "Cavity Creeps."

On February 18, 2014, the album was reissued via I Scream Records, who re-released the rest of the band’s discography throughout the year.

== Critical reception ==
Alex Henderson of AllMusic wrote "The aggressively rockin' Back with a Bong! isn't a CD that's heavy on political content -- song titles like "Panty Raid," "Cavity Creeps" and "Attack Oof the Killer Beers" underscore the fact that wild, irreverent fun is the primarily goal of the Astoria, Queens residents. Profile Records -- which had become one of the largest independent labels thanks to rappers like Run-D.M.C. and Dana Dane -- turned to Murphy's Law in the hope of increasing its visibility in rock. The album wasn't a big seller, although the punkers did command a small following."

== Track listing ==
- All songs written by J Drescher, C Valle, T Schofield, and D Thompson
1. "Intro" – 1:42
2. "Panty Raid" – 2:57
3. "Yahoo!" – 1:46
4. "Attack of the Killer Beers" – 2:40
5. "Cavity Creeps" – 1:25
6. "Ska Song" – 2:20
7. "Quest for Herb" – 2:38
8. "America Rules" – 1:31
9. "Rage" – 2:04
10. "Wall of Death" – 1:43
11. "Secret Agent S.K.I.N." – 2:02
12. "Push Comes to Shove" – 2:03
13. "Bong" – 4:33

== Personnel ==
- Jimmy Drescher – vocals
- Todd "Youth" Schofield – guitar
- Chuck Valle – bass
- Doug "E. Beans" Thompson – drums
- Horns – courtesy of Columbia Records – arranged and played by
  - Angelo Moore
  - Christopher Dowd
  - Walter Kirby III
- Narration of "Secret Agent S.K.I.N." by Frenchie
- Recorded at Dreamland Recording Studio and Chung King "House of Metal", New York, U.S.
- Produced by Murphy's Law
- Assisted by Jack Flanagan, Bob Musso, Gary Miller and Nick Light
- Engineered by Dave Cook, Martin Kunitz and Chuck Valle
- Horns recorded at Blue Canyon Recorders, Los Angeles, U.S. – engineered by Craig Doubet
- Mastered by Howie Weinberg at Masterdisk, New York, USA
- Re-mastered for re-issue by Alan Douches at West West Side Studios
