= Heart Attack (band) =

American hardcore band

- Origin: New York City
- Genres: Hardcore punk,anarcho-punk
- Years active: 1980–1984
- Labels: Damaged Goods, Broken Rekkids, Rat Cage
- Past members: Jesse Malin; Javier Madriaga; John Frawley; Paul Praver; Jack Flannagan; Danny Sage

Heart Attack was an American early New York hardcore band formed in 1980 and active until 1984.

== History ==
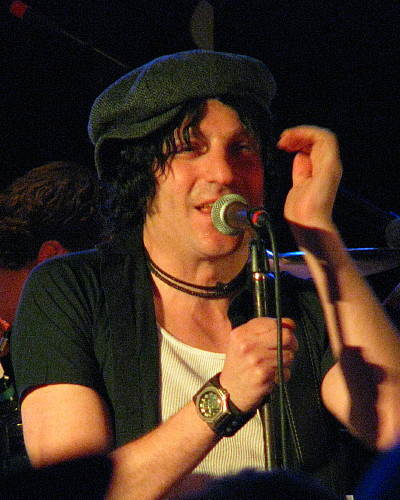
Jesse Malin performing at The Stone Pony in Asbury Park, NJ as part of the Light of Day Foundation Festival in 2016

Formed in the suburban area of Whitestone, Queens, in New York City, they were probably the youngest punk band in the New York City area at the time, according to some flyers and fanzines, as the first line-up was formed by people from 12 to 16 years old. Their first demos (Hitler Demo and The Mojo Sessions) was heavily influenced by English punk rock, especially Sex Pistols and The Clash, with hilarious lyrics, but soon after attending a CBGB show of the Bad Brains, singer Jesse Malin and guitarist Jackie Flanagan decided to switch genres to the latest wave of punk, hardcore.

Heart Attack existed for less than four years, part of the NYC hardcore scene with other bands such as the Beastie Boys, Kraut, Bad Brains, The Undead, The Mad, Reagan Youth, The Misguided, and Even Worse. Heart Attack was the first band of the area to go on tour in the rest of the United States. Their final show was on July 4, 1984, at CBGB. All of their songs are now published on "The Last War 1980–84" CD.

Malin went on to form the bands The Finger and D Generation (also with later Heart Attack guitarist Danny Sage), and later, a successful solo career. Flanagan went on to play in the New York group The Mob. Drummer Javier Madriaga later joined Reagan Youth. The band is mentioned in the film American Hardcore.

== Members ==
- Jesse Malin – guitar, vocals (later of Hope, the Steps of Sounds, D Generation and The Finger)
- John Frawley – bass (1980 – April 1982)
- Javier Madriaga – drums (ex-Lujuria, later in Reagan Youth)
- Paul Praver – bass (April 1982 – July 1984)
- Jack Flanagan – guitar (later of The Mob)
- Danny Sage – guitar (later of Hope, D Generation, now a solo artist)
- Missy Kresse – guitar (earliest incarnation)
- Richie Ferrara – drums (1978–80)
- Ron Torina – guitar
- Brandon Lewis – bass

== Discography ==
- God Is Dead 7-inch EP, Damaged Goods Records (1981)
- New York Thrash compilation cassette, CD and vinyl (1982; contains "God Is Dead" and "Shotgun")
- Keep Your Distance, 12-inch EP, Serious Clown Records (1983)
- Subliminal Seduction, 12-inch EP, Rat Cage Records (1984)
- Flipside Video Fanzine Number 5, VHS, songs: "MAN'S WORLD" & "BRAINWASHED HEROES" recorded at Olympic, LA-Perkins, Pasadena (1984)
- The Last War '80–'84, CD, Broken Rekkids Records (2001)
