= No Lunch =

Studio album by D Generation
- Released: July 2, 1996
- Recorded: February 1996
- Studio: Electric Lady (New York City)
- Genre: Rock, Glam punk
- Length: 41:33
- Label: Columbia
- Producer: Ric Ocasek

D Generation chronology
D Generation (1994)	No Lunch (1996)	Through The Darkness (1999)

Professional ratings
Review scores
Source	Rating
AllMusic	4.5/5 stars
Christgau's Consumer Guide	(dud)
E! Online	B+
Entertainment Weekly	B
Rolling Stone	4/5 stars
Spin	8/10

No Lunch is the second studio album by New York City glam punk band D Generation. It was their first for Columbia Records. The album was produced by Cars frontman Ric Ocasek.

The album would prove to be D Generation's most critically acclaimed, with reviewers citing New York Dolls and Ramones as strong influences. "No Way Out," "She Stands There," and "Capital Offender" were taken from the record as singles, with promotional videos recorded and released for the first two.

Tracks 3, 5, 8 and 12 are re-recorded versions of songs that appeared on their previous album. The opening track, "Scorch," was a new recording of a song that had appeared on the 1995 Flipside: R.A.F.R. compilation album.

== Track listing ==
1. "Scorch" (Richard Bacchus) - 1:17
2. "She Stands There" (Jesse Malin) - 2:19
3. "Frankie" (Bacchus, Malin) - 2:56
4. "Capital Offender" (Bacchus) - 2:41
5. "No Way Out" (Bacchus, Malin, Howie Pyro) - 4:00
6. "Major" (Malin) - 3:23
7. "Disclaimer" (Malin, Danny Sage) - 2:59
8. "Waiting for the Next Big Parade" (Bacchus, Malin, Pyro) - 3:21
9. "Not Dreaming" (Malin, Sage) - 2:25
10. "Too Loose" (Malin) - 3:34
11. "1981" (Malin, Sage) - 1:57
12. "Degenerated" (Cripple, Insurgent) - 10:37

== Personnel ==
D Generation

- Jesse Malin - vocals
- Richard Bacchus - guitar
- Howie Pyro - bass
- Danny Sage - guitar
- Michael Wildwood - drums
