= Howie Pyro =

American bassist (1960–2022)

- Born: Howard Kusten; June 28, 1960; New York City, U.S.
- Died: May 4, 2022 (aged 61) Los Angeles, California, U.S.
- Genres: Punk rock, heavy metal
- Occupation: Musician
- Instrument: Bass

Howie Pyro (born Howard Kusten, June 28, 1960 – May 4, 2022) was an American bass guitarist. He was a founding member of The Blessed, Freaks, D Generation, and PCP Highway. Pyro was also the bass player in Danzig from 2000 to 2003.

== Biography ==
Pyro was a DJ at Green Door parties as well as The Blackeyed Soul Club. He was the host of Intoxica Radio with Howie Pyro, an internet radio show, where he played "50s and 60s rock and roll, psycho surf, garage, rockabilly, hillbilly horrors, voodoo r & b, insane instrumentals, religious nuts, and teenage hell music." Pyro was also friends with Sid Vicious and was one of the last people to see the former Sex Pistols bassist alive; Pyro was there the night he died from a heroin overdose.

In December 2021, it was announced that Pyro was fighting for his life and in recovery following a liver transplant. His longtime friend and D Generation bandmate Jesse Malin announced a benefit concert for Pyro in January 2022, with all funds raised going to Pyro's medical and living expense for the next year as he recovered. Various other benefit shows were held for Pyro as well.

=== Death and tributes ===
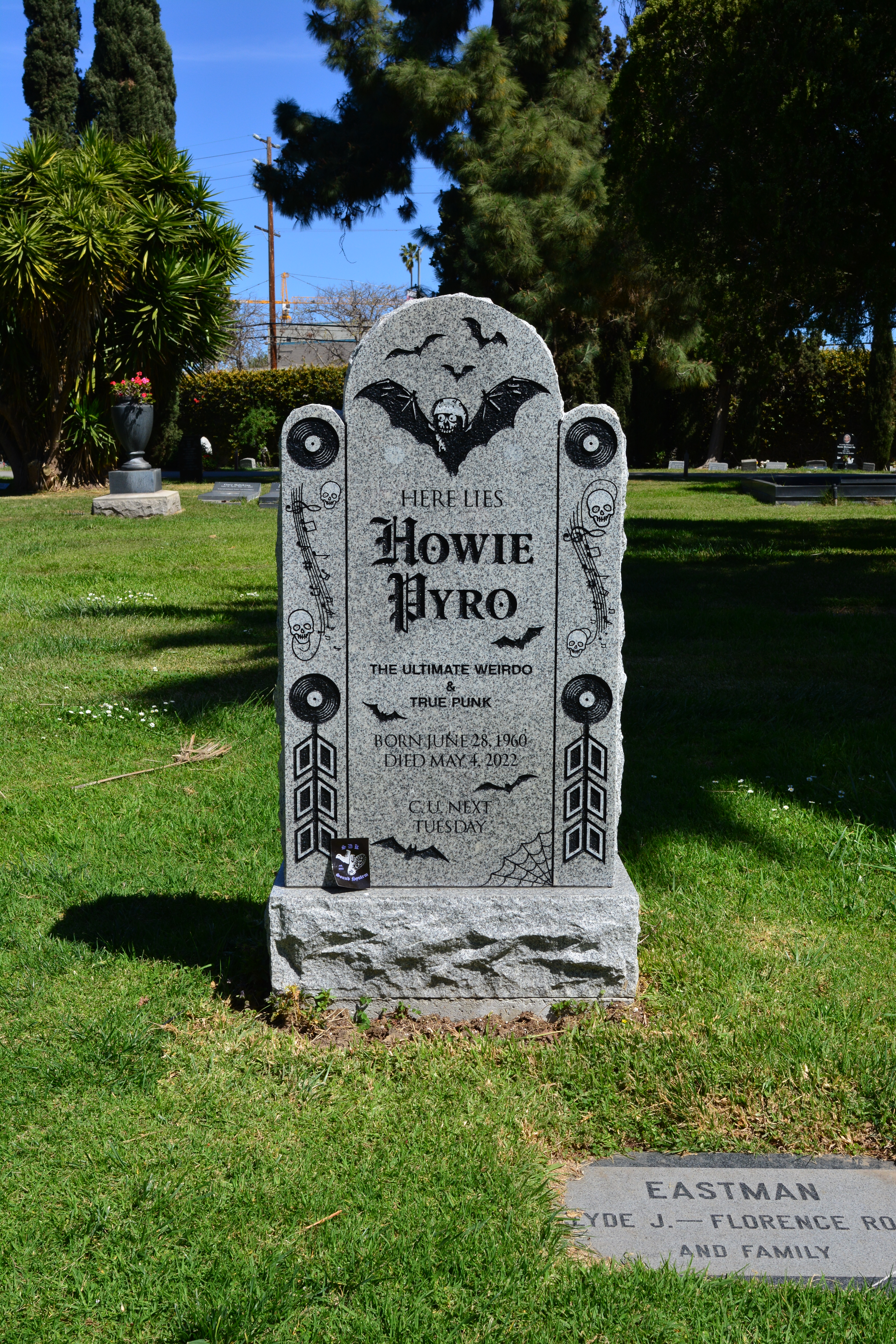
Howie Pyro's grave at Hollywood Forever Cemetery with the epitaph, "Here lies Howie Pyro, the ultimate weirdo and true punk."

Pyro died on May 4, 2022, from COVID-19-related pneumonia after suffering from liver disease.

Jesse Malin paid tribute to Pyro with the release of the single "Hollywood Forever" which was released on April 17, 2026. The single also features a cover of The Clash's "Rudie Can't Fail". “"Hollywood Forever" is a tribute to my dear friend, Howie Pyro, who passed away in 2022. His wish was to be buried in the legendary Hollywood Forever Cemetery. I’ve been thinking about him a lot lately and it means a lot to me to be able to tell you about him every night in my play ‘Silver Manhattan’, its our story and it’s our song. Thank you to Tad Kubler from The Hold Steady and Jimmy G from Murphy's Law for joining me, Derek, Rob, Paul and James on this one” Malin said in a statement.

== Discography ==
=== With The Blessed ===
- "Deep Frenzy" / "American Bandstand" (1979)

=== With Freaks ===
- Pippi Skelter: A Rock Opera in Five Movements (1988)
- Potter's Field – EP – (1988)
- In Sensurround (1989)
- "Freakout Song" – Single – (1990)

=== With Action Swingers ===
- More Fast Numbers (1992)

=== With D Generation ===
- "No Way Out" – Single – (1993)
  - Re-released in 1994 and 1996.
- "Wasted Years" – Single – (1993)
- "No God" / "Degenerated" – Single – (1994)
- D Generation – (1994)
- No Lunch – (1996)
- "She Stands There" – Single – (1996)
- "Capital Offender" – Single – (1997)
- "Prohibition" – EP – (1998)
- "Helpless" – Single – (1998)
  - Re-released in 1999.
- Through The Darkness – (1999)
- Nothing Is Anywhere – (2016)

=== With Joey Ramone ===
- Christmas Spirit... In My House (2002)

=== With Genesis P. Orridge / Splinter Test ===
- Electric Newspaper: Issue Four (1997)

=== With Danzig ===
- Live on the Black Hand Side – (2001)
- I Luciferi – (2002)
