= Sunset Kids =

Studio album by Jesse Malin
- Released: August 30, 2019
- Genre: Roots rock
- Length: 49:27
- Label: Wicked Cool Records
- Producer: Lucinda Williams and Tom Overby

Jesse Malin chronology
Outsiders (2015)	Sunset Kids (2019)	Lust for Love (2020)

Singles from Sunset Kids
- 1. "Meet Me at the End of the World Again" Released: June 30, 2017; 2. "Room 13" Released: June 3, 2019

Professional ratings
Aggregate scores
Source	Rating
Metacritic	81/100
Review scores
Source	Rating
AllMusic	4/5 stars
American Songwriter	4/5 stars
Americana UK	9/10 stars
PopMatters	(7/10)
Rolling Stone	4/5 stars

Sunset Kids is the eighth studio album by New York singer/songwriter Jesse Malin. It was released on August 30, 2019 by Wicked Cool Records and The Orchard. The album was produced by Lucinda Williams and Tom Overby, and features performances by Lucinda Williams, Billie Joe Armstrong, and Joseph Arthur.

== Track listing ==
All tracks are written by Jesse Malin, except where noted.

No.	Title	Writer(s)	Length
1.	"Meet Me at the End of the World Again"	Jesse Malin, Derek Cruz, Alejandro Escovedo	4:05
2.	"Room 13" (feat. Lucinda Williams)	Jesse Malin, Lucinda Williams, Tom Overby	3:56
3.	"When You're Young"	Jesse Malin, Holly Ramos, Derek Cruz	2:56
4.	"Chemical Heart"	Jesse Malin, Holly Ramos	2:31
5.	"Promises"	Jesse Malin, David Bianco	3:45
6.	"Shining Down"		3:15
7.	"Shane" (feat. Lucinda Williams)		3:07
8.	"Strangers & Thieves" (feat. Billie Joe Armstrong)	Billie Joe Armstrong, Jesse Malin	3:16
9.	"Revelations"		2:45
10.	"Gray Skies Look so Blue"		2:47
11.	"Do You Really Wanna Know"	Jesse Malin, Lucinda Williams, Derek Cruz	3:21
12.	"Friends in Florida"		4:35
13.	"Dead On" (feat. Lucinda Williams)	Jesse Malin, Lucinda Williams, Derek Cruz	3:34
14.	"My Little Life"		3:04

== Recording and production ==
Sunset Kids was produced by Lucinda Williams and engineered by David Bianco and Geoff Sanoff. The album was recorded on both coasts between the two artists' touring schedules. Two songs were co-written by Lucinda Williams including the first single, "Room 13." Other guests that appear on the album are Billie Joe Armstrong of Green Day, who co-wrote and sings on "Strangers and Thieves," and singer songwriter Joseph Arthur who appears on three tracks.

== Reception ==
Reviews for the album were mostly positive, gaining an 81 out of 100 score on review aggregating site Metacritic. Rolling Stone called it "a celebration of survival that finds the New York City hardcore troubadour reflecting on life’s precious and fleeting moments." American Songwriter said "each of these 14 tracks is an exquisitely constructed gem." Americana UK said "(the songs) fit together here into a triumph a record which must rank among the best of Malin’s career and among the best of this year."
