= D Generation =

American glam punk band

- Origin: New York City, U.S.
- Genres: Glam punk, garage rock
- Years active: 1991–1999; 2011–2016
- Labels: Chrysalis; Columbia; C2
- Members: Jesse Malin; Richard Bacchus; Danny Sage; Michael Wildwood
- Past members: Howie Pyro; Georgie Seville; Belvy K; Todd Youth; Scotti Dee; Jim Wallerstein
- Website: dgeneration.us

D Generation (also known as DGen) was an American glam punk band formed in 1991 in New York City. They released three albums and several EPs, to much critical acclaim, before breaking up in 1999. In 2011 the band reunited for a series of shows in Europe and the United States. In 2016, they released their fourth album, Nothing Is Anywhere. The group's sound blurs the lines between punk rock, glam rock and garage rock.

== History ==
The original lineup for D Generation consisted of vocalist Jesse Malin (who had previously played with New York band Heart Attack during the late 1980s), guitarist Danny Sage (also an ex-Heart Attack member), John Carco on bass, Howie Pyro on guitar, and drummer Michael Wildwood (Danny Sage's brother). The band had not yet been named, although much of the material would later be performed and recorded by D Generation. The line up did not last. After bassist John Carco quit (later to join forces with Dee Dee Ramone), Malin and Pyro (who had switched to bass) continued to play, naming the band and adding Richard Bacchus on guitar, and Sage and Wildwood left briefly to finish up their previous projects and were replaced for a brief time, 4 months only, by Georgie Seville and Belvy K respectively. Sage and Wildwood soon returned, solidifying the lineup that lasted for the majority of their career.

=== Debut release, No Lunch and touring ===
The band first signed with Chrysalis Records, with whom they released their debut album, D Generation. Despite a generally favorable critical and audience reaction, the album's promotional support was abruptly pulled following the appointment of a new executive at the label, who didn't like the band's music. The band left Chrysalis at the beginning of 1995, and signed with Columbia Records in April of that year. The band released their second album, No Lunch, on the label in 1996. The Cars frontman Ric Ocasek produced the record. Around this time D Generation played shows supporting such bands as Social Distortion, Ramones, and Kiss. Shortly after, Bacchus left the band, and was replaced by ex-Murphy's Law and Agnostic Front member Todd Youth. The band toured Europe with Green Day in early 1998.

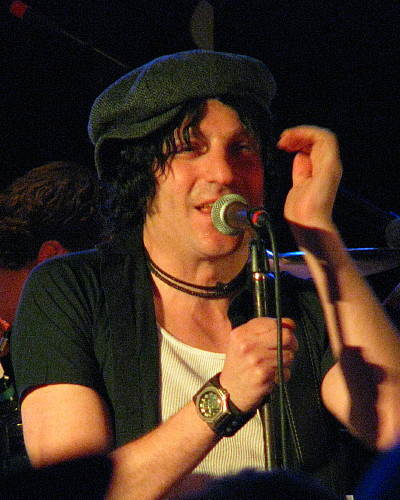
Jesse Malin, frontman for D Generation, performing at The Stone Pony in Asbury Park, NJ as part of the Light of Day Foundation Festival in 2016.

=== Through The Darkness and band split ===
D Generation then recorded their third album, Through the Darkness, this time with David Bowie and T.Rex producer Tony Visconti. However, once again the album failed to reach the sales that were hoped for, despite scoring the lead-off single on the soundtrack of the film The Faculty just a few months prior.

Just prior to the tour in support of that album, Youth and Wildwood left to form the short-lived but critically acclaimed Chrome Locust with bassist Jim Heneghan (formerly of Richard Bacchus's Vásquez), and released one self-titled album. For the tour, the band recruited drummer Joe Rizzo, and Richard Bacchus briefly returned on guitar and was then replaced during the band's last few dates by Jim Wallerstein. The band toured the US with The Offspring and The Living End, before playing their final show in their hometown at Coney Island High on April 24, 1999. This show was recorded by Greg Di Gesu from the Rolling Stones Mobile Studio, and has since remained unreleased. After this, D Generation broke up.

=== Post-D Generation ===
After the demise of D Generation in 1999, Michael Wildwood formed the critically acclaimed Chrome Locust with guitarist Todd Youth and bassist Jim Heneghan, releasing only one self-titled record. Wildwood then toured with New Jersey's Monster Magnet and played on their album Monolithic Baby!. In 2005, Wildwood joined Atomic#76. The group disbanded in 2007.

Both Wildwood and Sage lent their hands to help Hurricane Katrina victims, backing up Deborah Harry at a benefit in 2005.

Danny Sage recorded a solo album in 2002 (which has remained unreleased) and released two EPs, the self-titled Danny Sage and Don't Look Down, in 2003 and 2007, respectively, and has performed live.

Jesse, Howie and Joe Rizzo formed the band PCP Highway with guitarist Esko Poldvere. The band recorded a number of demo tracks and toured the east coast of the United States. During the beginning of 2000, Howie Pyro was invited to join Glenn Danzig's band (which then included former D Generation member Todd Youth on guitar). Pyro accepted and PCP Highway disbanded; a planned album, titled Dreamless, was never released.

Meanwhile, Bacchus was performing with his new project, Vásquez, which included Eric Kuby on drums and former Hanoi Rocks bassist Sami Yaffa (who replaced original bassist Jim Heneghan when he left to join Chrome Locust). This group released an independent EP, entitled Two Songs.

Malin began playing a series of solo shows and released a self-produced EP titled 169 in 2000. However, by the end of that year, Malin had re-teamed up with Esko and Joe Rizzo, along with bassist Johnny Pisano, to form a new band which was initially called Tsing-Tsing (a handful of shows were played under that name) and then re-christened Bellvue. Together they released one album, To Be Somebody in April 2001 on Goldenseal Records. This album was re-released in October 2001 with a slightly different track list. The following year, Bellvue disbanded, and Jesse revived his solo career, releasing the Ryan Adams-produced The Fine Art of Self Destruction in late 2002, followed by The Heat in 2004. He released his third album, Glitter in the Gutter, on March 20, 2007. The fourth album, On Your Sleeve, was released in April 2008. It consists entirely of famous rock covers, such as "Wonderful World" by Sam Cooke and "Walk on the Wild Side" by Lou Reed.

Currently, Bacchus is recording and touring with his band The Luckiest Girls. He released an album produced by Hanoi Rocks / New York Dolls bassist Sami Yaffa titled Jet Black and Beautiful on Stay Gold Records, an independent CD titled The Bicycle Diaries, and a split 7-inch on Old Grey Cat Records.

Howie Pyro and Todd Youth had also both left Danzig. Pyro went on to host the weekly Intoxica Radio show on LuxuriaMusic Internet Radio. Youth continued to play with a number of acts, including Ace Frehley, and has sporadically played in Jesse Malin's touring band over several years. Todd Youth died in 2018.

=== Reunion and Nothing Is Anywhere ===
On April 17, 2008, the band (consisting of Mailn, Pyro, Bacchus, Sage and Wildwood) re-formed for a one-off performance at the John Varvatos store in New York City (located in the space of the former CBGB) as part of a VH1 Save The Music benefit, during which they played a three-song set.

In April 2011, almost 12 years after their final show, the band announced that they had re-formed to play shows in September of that year in New York City, Los Angeles and Spain. The band also performed a sold-out London show on September 5 as well as the 2011 Riot Fest Chicago in October 2011 and Fun Fun Fun Fest in Austin, Texas, in November 2011. As a warmup for their New York City shows, the band performed on September 15 at the Wonder Bar in Asbury Park, New Jersey. Following these dates the band opened two shows for Guns N' Roses in December 2011 on their US tour stops in Auburn Hills, Michigan, and Cincinnati, Ohio.

On December 13, 2011, Jesse Malin stated, in an interview with Rolling Stone, that the band would go into rehearsals for a new album in January 2012. It was later announced, via various tweets from the band's Twitter page, that the band had entered the studio to start work on a new album to be produced by Ryan Adams; however, the material from those sessions remains unreleased.

On April 18, 2015, D Generation released a 10-inch single titled "Queens of A" for Record Store Day, that featured two new songs ("Queens of A" and "Piece of the Action"). These songs were the band's first release of new music since 1999. D Generation's first album in 17 years was released on July 29, 2016, and was titled Nothing Is Anywhere. It was produced by guitarist Danny Sage. The band did a few east coast dates at the end of July 2016 to coincide with this release in Ringwood, New Jersey, Philadelphia, Pennsylvania, and New York City. This was followed by a handful of west coast dates during the last week of August 2016, with their show at Doug Fir Lounge in Portland, Oregon on August 30, 2016, being their last live performance until 2022.

In December 2021, it was announced that Howie Pyro was fighting for his life and in recovery following a liver transplant. Jesse Malin announced a benefit concert Pyro in January 2022 with all funds raised going to Pyro's medical and living expense for the next year as he recovers. Various other benefit shows were held for Pyro. In May 2022, Pyro, who had already suffered from liver disease, died from COVID-19-related pneumonia. On July 23, 2022, a memorial show was held at the Bowery Ballroom in New York City, which featured performances by a number of acts, culminating with a 9-song set by DGeneration, during which Kevin Tyler Preston played bass for the band.

On June 14, 2023, Jesse Malin announced that he suffered a rare spinal stroke in May 2023 that has left him paralyzed. Malin and friends were commemorating the one year anniversary of the passing of Howie Pyro when Malin suffered a stroke that left him unable to walk. Malin is expected to be released from the hospital in late June and a donation campaign has been set up by his manager and other artists to help pay for his medical expenses.

DGeneration announced its first live performance in five years, which will be on the bill for Little Steven's Underground Garage Cruise 3, which takes place from April 24-28, 2027. It is unknown at this time who will play bass for the band.

== Members ==
Current members

- Jesse Malin – vocals (1991–1999, 2011–present)
- Richard Bacchus – guitar, vocals (1991–1997, 1999, 2011–present)
- Danny Sage – guitar, vocals (1992–1999, 2011–present)
- Michael Wildwood – drums (1992–1999, 2011–present)

Former members

- Howie Pyro – bass (1991–1999, 2011–2022; died 2022)
- Georgie Seville – guitar (1991–1992)
- Belvy K – drums (1991–1992)
- Todd Youth – guitar (1997–1999; died 2018)
- Joe Rizzo – drums (1999)
- Jim Wallerstein – guitar (1999)

== Discography ==
=== Albums ===
List of studio albums, with selected chart positions and sales figures
Title	Album details	Peak chart positions	Sales
Title	Album details	US Heat.	Sales
D Generation	Released: October 11, 1994; Label: Chrysalis	—	US: 10,343
No Lunch	Released: July 16, 1996; Label: Columbia	—	US: 12,564
Through the Darkness	Released: February 23, 1999; Label: C2/Columbia	—	US: 6,406
Nothing Is Anywhere	Released: July 29, 2016; Label: Self-released	18	
"—" denotes a recording that did not chart or was not released in that territory.

=== EP ===
- Prohibition – (1998)

=== Singles ===
- "No Way Out" b/w "Guitar Mafia" – (1993)
- "Wasted Years" b/w "Waiting For The Next Big Parade" – (1993)
- "Degenerated" b/w "No God" – (1994)
- "No Way Out" – (1994; version from the DGeneration album)
- "She Stands There" – (1996)
- "No Way Out" – (1996; version from the No Lunch album)
- "Capital Offender" – (1997)
- "Helpless" – (1998)
  - Re-released in 1999.
- "Queens Of A" b/w "Piece of The Action" – (2015)

=== Compilations ===
- "No Way Out" (1994 version) on Airheads soundtrack (1994)
- "No Way Out" (1994 version) on Loaded: Volume 1 (1995)
- "Scorch" on Flipside: R.A.F.R. Compilation (1995; different version than on No Lunch)
- "No God" on A Small Circle of Friends: A Tribute To The Germs (1996)
- "I Got Nuthin'" on We Will Fall (A Tribute to Iggy Pop) (1997)
- "Dying For A Living" on Old Skars and Upstarts (1998)
- "Helpless" on Explore – (Columbia Records sampler 1998)
- "Helpless" on The Faculty Soundtrack (1998)
- "Hatred" on Universal Soldier II: The Return soundtrack (1999)
- "Prohibition" on A Fistful Of Rock N Roll: Volume 4 (2000; different version than on the Prohibition EP)

=== Demo tapes ===
- D-Generation – (1992) [13-track, cassette-only release, distributed in limited quantities by the band. The 4 songs that appeared on their two, 1993 singles were taken from this recording; some songs were later re-recorded for their debut album].
