= Chrome Locust =

American stoner rock band

- Origin: New York City, United States
- Genres: Stoner rock
- Years active: 1998–1999
- Label: Tee Pee Records
- Spinoff of: D Generation
- Past members: Michael Wildwood; Todd Youth; Jim Heneghan

Chrome Locust were an American stoner rock band formed in New York City that was active between 1998 and 1999.

"In the Summer of 1998, while New York punk kings D Generation went on hiatus, drummer Michael Wildwood and guitarist Todd Youth (who had previously formed and played with seminal outfits Agnostic Front and Murphy's Law) began work on a side project that evolved out of a jam session that the two had with bassist Jim Heneghan (who was in Vásquez at the time). Within a few months, all three decided to leave their respective groups in order to devote all of their energies to this new band, which they dubbed Chrome Locust."

== Discography ==
=== Albums ===
- Chrome Locust - (1999)

=== Compilations ===
- Built for Speed - a Motörhead Tribute - (1999)
