= Through the Dark =

Through the Dark may refer to:

== Films ==
- Through the Dark (1924 film), an American silent film directed by George W. Hill
- Through the Dark (2016 film), an interactive film directed by Mike Daly

== Music ==
- "Through the Dark", a song by British singer songwriter Alexi Murdoch, from his 2011 album Towards the Sun
- "Through the Dark", a song by British-Irish boy band One Direction, from their album Midnight Memories
- "Through the Dark", a song by Australian hip hop group Hilltop Hoods, from their album Walking Under Stars

== See also ==
- Through the Darkness (disambiguation)
