= Murphy's Law (Murphy's Law album) =

Studio album by Murphy's Law
- Released: 1986
- Recorded: July 1986; Sound Ideas and Evergreen Studios, New York City, U.S.
- Genres: Hardcore punk, crossover thrash
- Length: 23:15
- Labels: Profile Records; Another Planet 1994 reissue
- Producer: Robert Musso

Murphy's Law chronology
Bong Blast (1983)	Murphy's Law (1986)	Back With A Bong (1989)

Re-issue cover
- 1994 Another Planet re-issue – with Back With A Bong on same disc

Professional ratings
Review scores
Source	Rating
Allmusic	4/5 stars

Murphy's Law is the debut studio album by American hardcore punk band Murphy's Law. It was released in 1986 on Profile Records, which was attempting to broaden its horizons from the rap genre it was generally known for at that time. It was re-issued by Another Planet records in 1994 with Back With A Bong on the same disc. On January 1, 2014, the album was reissued once again via I Scream Records, who re-released the rest of the band’s discography throughout the year.

The album produced many songs that remain staples at their live shows such as "Beer", "Crucial Bar-B-Q" and "Sit Home & Rot".

The song "A Day In The Life" was featured in the 2008 video game Grand Theft Auto IV on the LCHC (WHERE HARDCORE LIVES) radio station, which lead singer Jimmy Drescher was the host of.

== Critical reception ==
In a contemporary review Maximum RocknRoll wrote "A supposedly “fun” album by this New York band, one of many that play good music (punk—as opposed to thrash metal—in this case)."

Among later reviews Jason Anderson of AllMusic stated "The eponymous Murphy's Law debut is perhaps one of the most rocking New York punk releases to appear in the '80s. The manic tempos, masochistic vocals, and other hardcore signatures are toned down here to better suit the group's party message. Apolitical when compared to hard-line contemporaries like Cro-Mags and Agnostic Front, Murphy's Law shoots for an inebriated slice-of-life essence more aligned with Boston's Gang Green. The right-wing and skinhead references didn't exactly sit well with some '80s punk observers who mistakenly labeled the band as fascist. But even a casual study of "California Pipeline" and "Ilsa" reveals an allegiance contrary to the skinhead stereotype."

Reviewing the album following the 2014, reissue Tom of PunkNews added "Murphy"s Law is clearly a product of the 80's. There's the obligatory Ronald Reagan taunt ("California Pipeline"). There's a song about a cartoon/toy fad ("Care Bear"). The song "Beer" throws around the word "queer" in a way that might make the younger, politically correct crowd uncomfortable. The whole album is so good natured that it shouldn't offend many."

== Track listing ==
1. Murphy's Law
2. California Pipeline
3. Sit Home & Rot
4. Fun
5. Beer
6. Wahoo Day
7. Crucial Bar-B-Q
8. A Day In The Life
9. Care Bear
10. Ilsa
11. Skinhead Rebel
12. I Got A Right

== Personnel ==
- Jimmy Drescher – lead vocals
- Alex Morris – guitars
- Petey Hines – drums, backing vocals
- Pete Martinez – bass
- Recorded July, 1986 at Sound Ideas and Evergreen Studios, New York City, USA
- Produced and engineered by Robert Musso for Action Entertainment Group, Inc
- Assistant engineered by Dary S
- Mixed at 39th Street Studios and Quadrasonic, New York City, USA
- Cover illustration by Alex Morris
- 1994 re-issue remastered by Alan Douches at West West Side Music
