= Love It to Life =

Studio album by Jesse Malin
- Released: April 27, 2010
- Recorded: Mission Studios, Greenpoint, Brooklyn; Think Tank Studios, Hoboken, NJ
- Genre: Rock, punk rock, folk rock
- Label: Side One Dummy
- Producer: Ted Hutt

Jesse Malin chronology
Mercury Retrograde (2008)	Love It to Life (2010)	New York Before the War (2015)

Professional ratings
Review scores
Source	Rating
Consequence of Sound	2.5/5 stars
NME	5/10 stars
The Music Cycle	5/5 stars
Slant Magazine	3.5/5 stars

Love It to Life is the fifth studio album by Jesse Malin. It features a collective of players and friends called "The St. Marks Social". The first single from the album was "Burning the Bowery". The album was released on April 27, 2010.

On two of the tracks ("The Archer" and "Disco Ghetto") Malin's best friend Ryan Adams played electric guitar and sang backing vocals.

== Track listing ==
1. "Burning the Bowery"
2. "All the way from Moscow"
3. "The Archer"
4. "St. Mark's Sunset"
5. "Lowlife in a High Rise"
6. "Disco Ghetto"
7. "Burn the Bridge"
8. "Revelations"
9. "Black Boombox"
10. "Lonely at Heart"
