= The Chelsea Smiles =

American hard rock band

- Origin: Los Angeles
- Genres: Hard rock
- Years active: 2004–Present
- Labels: Capitol Records; Acetate Records; People Like You; DR2/Demolition Records
- Members: Skye Vaughan-Jayne; Johnny Martin; RJ Ronquillo; Karl Rosqvist
- Past members: Christian Martucci; Todd Youth

The Chelsea Smiles are a hard rock band formed in 2004 featuring Karl Rosqvist of Danzig, Steel Prophet, Skye Vaughan-Jayne of Bullets and Octane, Johnny Martin and RJ Ronquillo.

== History ==
The band was formed by guitarist Todd Youth in the aftermath of his Danzig exit, just before forming the Chelsea Smiles, Youth had played some shows with Motörhead filling in on guitar for Phil Campbell.

Youth was joined in the formation of the Chelsea Smiles by drummer, Karl Rosqvist ("Rockfist") (formerly of Steel Prophet), Danzig, bassist Johnny Martin and Christian Martucci who previously played with Dee Dee Ramone's band.

Together they released a four song EP named "Nowhere Ride" in 2005 on Capitol Records, the following year, vocalist Martucci left the band to form Black President. He was replaced by Skye Vaughan-Jayne, former Bullets And Octane guitarist/songwriter.

The band toured with several notable bands such as Social Distortion, The Datsuns and the reformed New York Dolls. A debut full-length album titled; "Thirty Six Hours Later" followed with a US release date on November 7, 2006. Vocal duties on the album were shared by both Todd and Skye. The record was released in Europe in early December 2006, the Chelsea Smiles toured the United States with Swedish rockers Backyard Babies, Social Distortion, etc. in support of the record as well as many headlining tours in Europe and the US.

Detroit native and LA studio musician RJ Ronquillo joined The Chelsea Smiles in January 2009. RJ, who is an in-demand studio player, met Todd Youth through the various studio work they both do in the Los Angeles area. RJ has played on albums from Ricky Martin, Santana, 2pac and DMX, to name a few.

In March 2009 The Chelsea Smiles signed a worldwide licensing deal with DR2/Demolition Records to release the group's new record which came out in March 2009, and the band toured in support of the record in the United Kingdom and in the US.

Youth died on October 27, 2018, at the age of 47.

== Members ==
Current

- Skye Vaughan-Jayne - lead vocals
- RJ Ronquillo - vocals, guitar
- Johnny Martin - bass, vocals
- Karl Rosqvist ("Rockfist") - drums
- Ty Smith - drums

Former

- Christian Martucci - guitar/vocals
- Todd Youth - vocals, guitar (Died 2018)

== Discography ==
=== Album ===
- Thirty Six Hours Later - (2006) Acetate Records/People Like You Records.
- The Chelsea Smiles - (2009) Demolition Records/ DR2 Records.

=== EP ===
- Nowhere Ride - (2005) Capitol Records/ EMI Records

=== Soundtrack ===
- Annapolis Soundtrack - (2006) Touchstone Pictures/ Disney
- Flatout 2 In-Game Soundtrack (2006)
- Park Soundtrack (2007)
- Close To Home (2006 TV-series) Warner Brothers
