= On Your Sleeve =

Studio album by Jesse Malin
- Released: April 7, 2008 (UK); October 28, 2008 (US)
- Recorded: Sear Sound; Stratosphere Studios, New York City
- Genre: Indie rock
- Length: 49:27
- Label: One Little Indian
- Producer: Diane Gentile

Jesse Malin chronology
Glitter in the Gutter (2007)	On Your Sleeve (2008)	Mercury Retrograde (2008)

Professional ratings
Aggregate scores
Source	Rating
Metacritic	61/100
Review scores
Source	Rating
Allmusic	4/5 stars
BBC	(unfavorable)
Drowned in Sound	(4/10)
Rolling Stone	2.5/5 stars

On Your Sleeve is Jesse Malin's fourth studio album. It consists entirely of covers of other artists' songs. The album was first released in the UK on April 7, 2008. The North American version of the album, released on October 28, 2008, features a different track listing from the European release, including a newly recorded version of "You Can Make Them Like You," and Malin's previously released cover of Bruce Springsteen's "Hungry Heart."

== UK track listing ==
1. "Looking for a Love" (Neil Young) – 3:51
2. "Do You Remember Rock 'n' Roll Radio?" (The Ramones) – 3:20
3. "Sway" (The Rolling Stones) – 3:29
4. "Russian Roulette" (The Lords of the New Church) – 3:14
5. "Gates of the West" (The Clash) – 3:22
6. "Me and Julio Down by the Schoolyard" (Paul Simon) – 2:27
7. "You Can Make Them Like You" (The Hold Steady) – 2:30
8. "Walk on the Wild Side" (Lou Reed) – 4:01
9. "Harmony" (Elton John) – 2:48
10. "Rodeo Town" (The Kills) – 3:21
11. "Wonderful World" (Sam Cooke) – 2:24
12. "Operator" (Jim Croce) – 3:53
13. "I Hope I Don't Fall in Love With You" (Tom Waits) – 3:56
14. "Everybody's Talkin'" (Fred Neil) – 3:39
15. "Yoshimi" (The Flaming Lips) (unlisted bonus track) – 3:13

== US track listing ==
1. "Leaving Babylon" (Bad Brains) – 4:08
2. "Me and Julio Down by the Schoolyard" (Paul Simon) – 2:27
3. "Sway" (The Rolling Stones) – 3:29
4. "Russian Roulette" (The Lords of the New Church) – 3:14
5. "Walk on the Wild Side" (Lou Reed) – 4:01
6. "You Can Make Them Like You" (The Hold Steady) – 2:30
7. "Harmony" (Elton John) – 2:48
8. "It's Not Enough" (Johnny Thunders and The Heartbreakers) – 1:16
9. "Looking for a Love" (Neil Young) – 3:51
10. "Lady from Baltimore" (Tim Hardin) – 2:52
11. "Operator" (Jim Croce) – 3:53
12. "Fairytale of New York" (The Pogues featuring Kirsty MacColl) – 4:47
13. "Hungry Heart" (Bruce Springsteen) – 3:50
14. "Everybody's Talkin'" (Fred Neil) – 3:39
