= The Party's Over (Murphy's Law album) =

Studio album by Murphy's Law
- Released: May 22, 2001
- Recorded: 2000–2001
- Genre: Hardcore punk
- Length: Lobo Studios, Long Island, New York
- Labels: Artemis Records, Reflex/Wolfpack Records
- Producer: Daniel Rey

Murphy's Law chronology
Dedicated (1996)	The Party's Over (2001)	Beer, Smoke, and Live (2002)

Professional ratings
Review scores
Source	Rating
AllMusic	2.5/5 stars
The Encyclopedia of Popular Music	3/5 stars
Ox-Fanzine	7/10
PunkNews	4.5/5 stars

The Party's Over is an album by hardcore punk band Murphy's Law. It was released in 2001 on Artemis Records. Reflex/Wolfpack Records released the European vinyl pressing of the album in 2002.

== Production and background ==
The album was produced by Daniel Rey.

In an interview, lead singer Jimmy Drescher commented on the album:

...it's a lot of songs. I mean some actual songs and some lyrics and stuff. Not a lot of songs about just beer and pot, although some of that's in there too. But we're covering some more topics like the song "Maximum Lie" which is about Maximum Rock N Roll and a lot of the bullshit that they write about. And a lot of the judgmental attitude they have on a lot of people and a lot of the negative things they write about people. Y'know we're touching a part of some heavier topics and also songs about the state of New York right now. How there's nowhere for bands to play and our mayor tries to control what we do and what we see and the art and what we listen to and how loud music should be and where it should be played. It's a real real tough situation.

The title of the album is a reference to New York City's music scene at the turn of the century.

== Critical reception ==
AllMusic called the album "15 tracks of blistering, rowdy, and fast club punk, something that diehard fans should truly savor." Billboard wrote that singer Jimmy G "displays a wider range and a sense of melody only hinted at on past albums." PunkNews stated, "The Party's Over is a criminally overlooked record in their prolific catalogue. It rocks with ferocity and fun and insight and humor." Ox-Fanzine added, "As for the ska influences, they appear only very sporadically—which is a good thing. All in all, it's a truly thrilling, rock 'n' roll-infused punk album packed with melodies; for the most part, it's closer to bands like Electric Frankenstein or Turbo AC's than to S.O.I.A."

== Track listing ==
1. "Maximum Lie" - 2:31
2. "Vicky Crown" - 2:53
3. "Stressed Out" - 1:37
4. "Hypocrite" - 1:27
5. "Bitch" - 1:39
6. "Redemption Time" - 1:53
7. "Mission" - 2:53
8. "Walking Alone" - 2:20
9. "Wasting My Time" - 2:19
10. "C-Low" - 2:30
11. "Faith" - 1:53
12. "Skinhead Girl" - 3:15
13. "Know Loyalty" - 2:21
14. "Exile" - 2:12
15. "Woke Up Tied Up" - 3:06

== Credits ==
- Bass – Sal Villanueva (tracks: Sal Villaneuva)
- Drums – Eric Goat Arce
- Engineer – Joe Hogan
- Engineer (assistant) – Merle Chornuk
- Engineer, mixed by – Jon Marshall Smith
- Guitar – Rick Bacchus
- Producer, mixed by – Daniel Rey
- Reissue producer – Phil Merckx, Sebastiaan Putseys
- Saxophone – Raven
- Vocals – Jimmy Drescher
