= Glitter in the Gutter =

Studio album by Jesse Malin
- Released: March 20, 2007
- Recorded: Los Angeles, California
- Genre: Indie rock
- Length: 43:48
- Label: Adeline Records; One Little Indian
- Producer: Rob Caggiano, Eddie Wohl

Jesse Malin chronology
The Heat (2004)	Glitter in the Gutter (2007)	On Your Sleeve (2008)

Professional ratings
Aggregate scores
Source	Rating
Metacritic	67/100
Review scores
Source	Rating
Allmusic	4/5 stars
Prefix	7/10 stars
Rolling Stone	3/5 stars

Glitter in the Gutter is singer-songwriter Jesse Malin's third studio album, released on Adeline Records on March 20, 2007. Glitter in the Gutter includes Malin's cover of The Replacements' "Bastards of Young," and the album features guest appearances from Bruce Springsteen (backing vocals on "Broken Radio"), Jakob Dylan (backing vocals on "Black Haired Girl"), Josh Homme, and Chris Shiflett of Foo Fighters and Me First and the Gimme Gimmes. Jesse Malin's good friend Ryan Adams guests on several tracks as well.

"In the Modern World" gets frequent play on Little Steven's Underground Garage.

The album was re-released in 2022 featuring a rerecorded version of Broken Radio (Broken Radio 22) and an additional track "The Angel To The Slave"

== Track listing ==
1. "Don't Let Them Take You Down (Beautiful Day!)" – 2:51
2. "In the Modern World" – 2:58
3. "Tomorrow Tonight" – 3:30
4. "Broken Radio" – 3:37
5. "Prisoners of Paradise" – 2:56
6. "Black Haired Girl" – 3:00
7. "Lucinda" – 2:56
8. "Love Streams" – 3:28
9. "Little Star" – 2:58
10. "Bastards of Young" – 3:36
11. "Happy Ever After (Since You're in Love 2007)" – 4:06
12. "NY Nights" – 3:47
13. "Aftermath" – 4:05

== Singles ==
- "Don't Let Them Take You Down (Beautiful Day!)" (February 12, 2007), one-sided 7" vinyl
  1. "Don't Let Them Take You Down (Beautiful Day!)"
- "Broken Radio" (May 21, 2007), CD and 7" vinyl
  1. "Broken Radio" (Dave Bascombe Radio Mix)
  2. "Sister Christian Where Are You Now"
  3. "Broken Radio" (album version)
- "Love Streams" (August 20, 2007), promo CD
  1. "Love Streams" (Dave Bascombe Radio Mix)
