= Through the Darkness (album) =

Through The Darkness

Studio album by D Generation
- Released: February 23, 1999
- Genre: Rock, glam punk
- Label: C2/Columbia
- Producer: Tony Visconti

D Generation chronology
No Lunch (1996)	Through The Darkness (1999)	Nothing is Anywhere (2016)

Professional ratings
Review scores
Source	Rating
AllMusic	3/5 stars
Christgau's Consumer Guide	(choice cut)
Entertainment Weekly	A−
Hit Parader	B
Los Angeles Times	3/4 stars
Rolling Stone	3/5 stars

Through The Darkness is the third album by New York City glam punk band D Generation, released on February 23, 1999. It was their second released via Columbia Records, and their last release until 2016. It is the only D Generation album without founding member and guitarist Richard Bacchus, who was replaced by Todd Youth. The album was produced by T. Rex and David Bowie producer Tony Visconti. Drummer Michael Wildwood's writing credits on "Lonely" and "Cornered" are listed under his actual name of "Michael Reich."

D Generation broke up a month after its release; the band eventually regrouped to record a new album, Nothing Is Anywhere, which was released 17 years later, in 2016. "Helpless" was taken from the record as a single; the single appeared in the movie The Faculty.

== Critical reception ==
CMJ New Music Report wrote that the album's "relentless power chords could light up all of Times Square."

== Track listing ==
1. "Helpless" (Jesse Malin) - 3:33
2. "Every Mother's Son" (Malin) - 2:46
3. "Hatred" (Malin, Danny Sage) - 3:19
4. "Rise & Fall" (Malin) - 2:53
5. "Only a Ghost" (Malin) - 4:04
6. "Lonely" (Malin, Sage, Howie Pyro, Michael Reich) - 4:09
7. "Good Ship Down" (Malin, Sage) - 3:23
8. "Sick on the Radio" (Malin, Sage) - 3:30
9. "Chinatown" (Malin, Pyro) - 2:09
10. "So Messed Up" (Malin) - 3:31
11. "Sunday Secret Saints" (Malin, Todd Youth) - 3:03
12. "Cornered" (Reich) - 3:25
13. "Don't Be Denied (Neil Young) -16:27
14. "Violent Love" (Malin; an unlisted track which begins at the 10:00 mark of Track 13)

== Personnel ==
D Generation

- Jesse Malin - vocals
- Todd Youth - guitar
- Howie Pyro - bass
- Danny Sage - guitar
- Michael Wildwood - drums
