= The Fine Art of Self Destruction =

Studio album by Jesse Malin
- Released: 2002 (UK) 2003 (U.S.)
- Length: 47:31
- Label: Artemis
- Producer: Ryan Adams

Jesse Malin chronology
| The Fine Art of Self Destruction (2002) | The Heat (2004) |

Professional ratings
Aggregate scores
| Source | Rating |
|---|---|
| Metacritic | 84/100 |
Review scores
| Source | Rating |
| Allmusic | 4/5 stars |
| The Guardian | 4/5 stars |
| PopMatters | favourable |

The Fine Art of Self Destruction is Jesse Malin's debut solo album. Released on December 24, 2002 in the UK and January 28, 2003 in the United States. It was produced by Ryan Adams (his album-production debut). The front cover photograph was taken at Delancey Street Subway, Manhattan, New York City.

The album was reissued in 2022 to celebrate the album's 20th anniversary. The reissue featured eight re-recorded versions of songs from the original release.

== Track listing ==
All tracks are written by Jesse Malin, except where noted.

| No. | Title | Writer(s) | Length |
|---|---|---|---|
| 1. | "Queen of the Underworld" | | 3:43 |
| 2. | "TKO" | Jesse Malin, Johnny Pisano | 3:27 |
| 3. | "Wendy" | | 3:27 |
| 4. | "Downliner" | | 4:11 |
| 5. | "Brooklyn" | | 4:35 |
| 6. | "The Fine Art of Self Destruction" | | 3:55 |
| 7. | "Riding on the Subway" | | 4:13 |
| 8. | "High Lonesome" | | 4:06 |
| 9. | "Solitaire" | | 4:19 |
| 10. | "Almost Grown" | Jesse Malin, Joe McGinty | 3:04 |
| 11. | "Xmas" | | 3:37 |
| 12. | "Cigarettes and Violets" | | 4:30 |
| 13. | "Brooklyn" (Band Version) | | 4:54 |

2022 Anniversary Reissue
| No. | Title | Length |
|---|---|---|
| 14. | "Brooklyn (Walt Whitman in the Trash)" | 4:58 |
| 15. | "Riding on the Subway '22" | 4:23 |
| 16. | "Downliner (Afterglow Version)" | 4:25 |
| 17. | "High Lonesome (PBR Vacation)" | 4:31 |
| 18. | "Cigarettes and Violets '22" | 4:24 |
| 19. | "Almost Grown (Busker Version)" | 3:04 |
| 20. | "Solitaire (Song for Kelly Keller)" | 4:21 |
| 21. | "Queen of the Underworld (Cantina Version)" | 3:52 |
| 22. | "Xmas, Etc." | 3:37 |

== Personnel ==
- Jesse Malin – vocals, acoustic guitar
- Johnny Pisano - bass guitar, upright bass, backing vocals
- Paul Garisto - drums
- Joe McGinty - piano, Hammond organ, Wurlitzer
- Toby Dammit (Larry Mullins) - percussion
- Ryan Adams - electric guitars, backing vocals, keyboards
- Melissa Auf der Maur - backing vocals
- Richard Fortus - lead guitar on "Queen of the Underworld"
- Esko - guitar on "TKO"
