= The Heat (Jesse Malin album) =

Studio album by Jesse Malin
- Released: June 29, 2004
- Genre: Alternative rock
- Label: Artemis
- Producer: Jesse Malin

Jesse Malin chronology
The Fine Art of Self Destruction (2002)	The Heat (2004)	Glitter in the Gutter (2007)

Professional ratings
Aggregate scores
Source	Rating
Metacritic	76/100
Review scores
Source	Rating
AllMusic	3.5/5 stars
Rolling Stone	4/5 stars

The Heat is the second album by rock artist Jesse Malin. It was released on June 29, 2004, on Artemis Records.

== Track listing ==
1. "Mona Lisa"
2. "Swinging Man"
3. "Silver Manhattan"
4. "Arrested"
5. "Since You're In Love"
6. "Going Out West"
7. "Scars Of Love"
8. "New World Order"
9. "About You"
10. "Block Island"
11. "Basement Home"
12. "Hotel Columbia"
13. "Indian Summer"
14. "God's Lonely People"
