= The Mob (American hardcore band) =

New York hardcore band

The Mob is a New York hardcore band formed in 1980. The band began when Jack Flanagan left the group Heart Attack to form his own group with Ralph Gebbia, John Frawley, and Nicko. After being exposed to hardcore through a Bad Brains show at CBGB, the group started playing harder and faster (described by Flanagan as "speedrock"), moving away from the sound of the first wave of New York City punk rock bands. In 1981, Jose Gonzalez officially joined the group, following John Frawley's departure to join Heart Attack, and Jamie Shanahan replaced Nicko on drums. With Gonzalez, the Mob released two iconic hardcore singles, "Upset the System" and "Step Forward".

The Mob was included among the acts chosen to play the CBGB 10 year anniversary festival on December 24, 1983. A few months later in 1984, the Ramones selected The Mob to open consecutive shows on March 17 in Brooklyn, NY (at L'Amour West) and on March 20 in Washington, DC (The Wax Museum).

Gonzalez left the band to join HR for his first solo record It's About Luv, released in 1985 on Olive Tree Records. He was briefly replaced by Kenny Ahrens, lead vocalist of Urban Waste, before Chris Hackett assumed bass duties and the band recorded their first full-length album, We Come to Crush. The band continued, more or less with this lineup, until 1991, when they went on a hiatus with only a handful of sporadic shows and releases. In 2011, the group reunited to play live shows and record new music once again. From 2011 onward, the Mob shows and recordings were recorded as the Mob five-piece with Gonzalez on bass and Hackett on rhythm guitar. In 2012 the band released the single Back to Queens / That's It both written by Hackett/Gebbia. Jack Flanagan died in 2019 ending the 39-year run of the Mob. With the death of Flanagan, Hackett changed direction forming Monk & The 66, which Hackett describes as a DIY psychedelic soul garage band.” Monk & the 66 released their first single in March 2021.

== Band members ==
- Jack Flanagan – guitar
- Ralph Gebbia – vocals
- Jose Gonzalez – bass,
- Chris Hackett – bass, guitar
- Jamie Shanahan – drums
