= The Joneses (band) =

Punk band from California, U.S.

- Origin: Southern California
- Genres: Rock, punk rock
- Years active: 1981 - 1991, 1994 - Present
- Past members: Jeff Drake; Steve Olson; Steve Houston; Mitch Dean; Scott Franklin; Johnnie Sage; John James; Paul Mars Black; Greg Keuhn; Mike Sessa; Mike Occhiato

The Joneses were a punk band from Anaheim, Southern California. In 1981 guitarist and singer Jeff Drake and professional skateboarder Steve Olson formed its nucleus, but over the years the Joneses included numerous players with Drake being the only constant member. The incarnation of the Joneses voted "Best Live Band" in the 1984 L.A. Weekly Reader's Poll included, in addition to Drake, Scott Franklin (The Cramps), Paul Mars Black (L.A. Guns) & Johnnie Sage (The Mau Maus).

== Background ==
The Joneses' first seven-inch, 45 rpm single was "Criminals in My Car" b/w "Jonestown". They next released a pair of songs, "Graveyard Rock" and "Pillbox", on the 1982 BYO Records compilation, Someone Got Their Head Kicked In. The EP, Criminals, was the Joneses next released recording. Hell Comes to Your House Volume 2, included the two Joneses tracks: "I'm Bad" and "She's So Filthy". The BYO compilation was made up of predominantly hardcore bands. Even though The Joneses style differed greatly, they were still included because then guitarist Steve Houston was in a number of early Hardcore bands before that. The Joneses ended up receiving more hate mail than all the other bands combined got fan mail.

Their only full-length LP, Keeping Up With, was released by Doctor Dream Records in 1987. Although the record was promoted to be released in July 1986 and popular on college radio stations, legal delays kept the album from being available until well into 1987. Jeff Drake and a new incarnation of the band recorded a demo for RCA Records that was passed up and ended up becoming the Tits and Champagne EP, released in 1989 by Trigon Records. It was around this time that a band from Boston wanted to use the name "The Joneses", Drake settled out of court over the rights of the name, and for a brief time Drake's band was known as "The Hollywood Joneses".

After serving a three-year prison sentence for bank robbery, Drake reformed another incarnation of The Joneses and recorded the Anita Fix EP in 1995 released by Cabeza de Tornado Records. A compilation entitled Criminal History, was released by Sympathy for the Record Industry in February 2000, it is a 20 track retrospective of The Joneses' recorded material. The Criminal History compilation caused a resurgence in popularity in the late 2000s, as a new generation of fans were introduced to the band. All of The Joneses previous albums were re-released by Full Breach Kicks starting in 2006. The songs "Big Boy" and "Pill Box" were featured on two different Season 2 episodes of the MTV show Nitro Circus, "Hydro Circus" (episode 2) and "Mud and Guts" (episode 6), respectively.

== Music videos ==
A music video was recorded for the song "Black Cat Bone" in 1987, but was never finalized and released.
