= D Generation (album) =

Studio album by D Generation
- Released: October 11, 1994
- Genre: Rock, Glam punk
- Label: Chrysalis
- Producer: David Bianco

D Generation chronology
D Generation (1994)	No Lunch (1996)

Professional ratings
Review scores
Source	Rating
AllMusic	3/5 stars
Kerrang!	4/5 stars
Rolling Stone	3/5 stars

D Generation is the debut album by New York City glam punk band D Generation, released on October 11, 1994, through Chrysalis Records.

"No Way Out" was released as a single. Tracks 1,3, 5 and 7 are re-recorded versions of songs that had previously been released as 7-inch singles in 1993 ("No Way Out" b/w "Guitar Mafia" and "Wasted Years" b/w "Waiting For The Next Big Parade").

== Track listing ==
1. "No Way Out" (Richard Bacchus, Jesse Malin, Howie Pyro) - 4:23
2. "Sins of America" (Malin, Pyro, Danny Sage) - 3:39
3. "Guitar Mafia" (Malin, Sage) - 4:16
4. "Feel Like Suicide" (Malin, Sage) - 2:20
5. "Waiting for the Next Big Parade" (Bacchus, Malin, Pyro) - 4:28
6. "Falling" (Malin, Pyro) - 4:21
7. "Wasted Years" (Malin) - 2:53
8. "Stealing Time" (Malin, Pyro) - 3:28
9. "Ghosts" (Malin, Sage) - 3:59
10. "Frankie" (Bacchus, Malin) - 3:16
11. "Working on the Avenue" (Malin, Sage) - 2:55
12. "Vampire Nation" (Malin, Sage) - 4:27
13. "Degenerated" (Paul Cripple, Dave Insurgent of Reagan Youth) - 3:34

== Personnel ==
D Generation

- Jesse Malin - vocals
- Richard Bacchus - guitar
- Howie Pyro - bass
- Danny Sage - guitar
- Michael Wildwood - drums
