= Jesse Malin =

American musician and songwriter

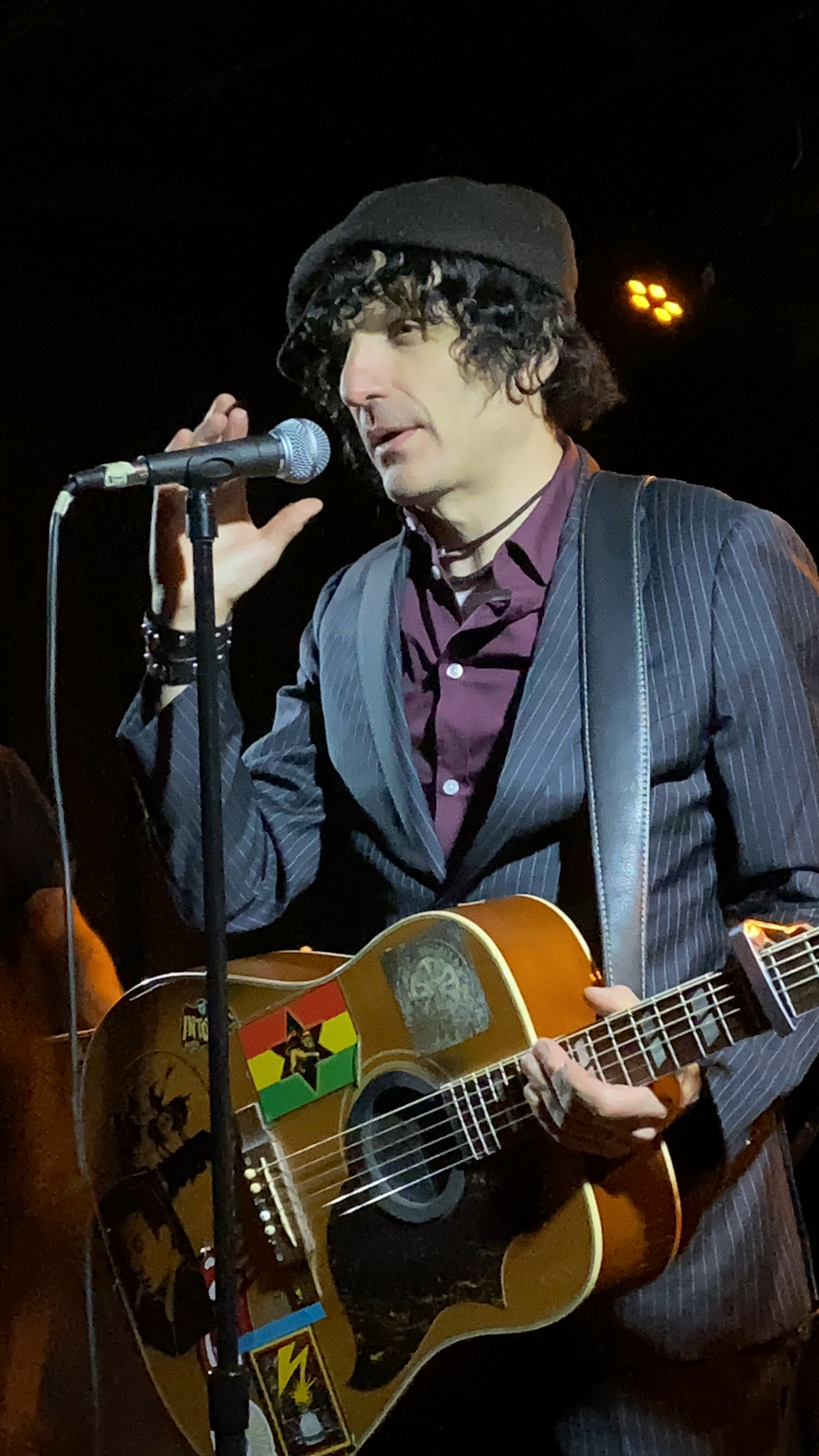
- Malin at The Seventh Street Entry in Minneapolis Minnesota, 2019

Background information
- Born: January 26, 1967 (age 59); Queens, New York, U.S.
- Genres: Rock, American rock, Americana, Roots rock, Punk rock
- Occupation: Singer-songwriter
- Instruments: Vocals, guitar
- Years active: 1980–present
- Labels: Artemis Records; Adeline Records; One Little Indian Records; SideOneDummy Records; Wicked Cool Records
- Member of: D Generation
- Formerly of: Heart Attack; The Finger; Bellvue; PCP Highway; Rodeo Queens
- Website: jessemalin.com

Jesse Malin (born January 26, 1967) is an American rock musician, guitarist, and songwriter. He began his performing career in the New York hardcore band Heart Attack, and rose to prominence as vocalist of D Generation. Since 2000, he has been a solo recording artist, having recorded numerous albums including the Lucinda Williams-produced Sunset Kids. Over the course of his career, Malin has collaborated with Bruce Springsteen, Billie Joe Armstrong of Green Day, Ryan Adams and numerous other musicians.

== Biography ==
=== Early career ===
Born January 26, 1967, Malin began his music career at the age of 12, as the frontman for the seminal New York City hardcore band Heart Attack. The band auditioned at CBGB but were denied because they couldn't bring in a drinking crowd to the bar. Following the demise of Heart Attack in 1984, Malin worked on several other projects, including the band Hope, before joining the band D Generation as the lead singer. As one of New York City's most noted bands of the 1990s, D Generation released three albums, including the critically acclaimed No Lunch, before eventually disbanding in April 1999. The band reunited and released its fourth album, Nothing Is Anywhere, in 2016.

Malin didn't stop writing music and went on to form two other projects, PCP Highway (with former D Generation bandmates Howie Pyro and Joe Rizzo) and Bellvue (also named Tsing-Tsing for a brief time); the latter band released one album, To Be Somebody, on Goldenseal Records. The album included versions of songs that would later be reworked for Malin's first two solo albums, including "Solitaire", "Basement Home", "Brooklyn" and "Downliner".

=== Solo career ===
Malin spent the next two years working on a fresh sound. Former Whiskeytown front-man Ryan Adams, who'd been a friend of Malin since the D Generation days, was impressed with Malin's new material. Adams offered to produce Malin's debut album despite the fact that he'd never produced a record before. The two headed into Loho Studios in New York in January 2001 and made an album in just six days. A deal with Artemis Records soon followed. The Fine Art of Self Destruction appeared in the United Kingdom in October 2002. The lead off first single "Queen of the Underworld" was a moderate hit and the British press quickly hailed Malin's debut as one of the year's best.

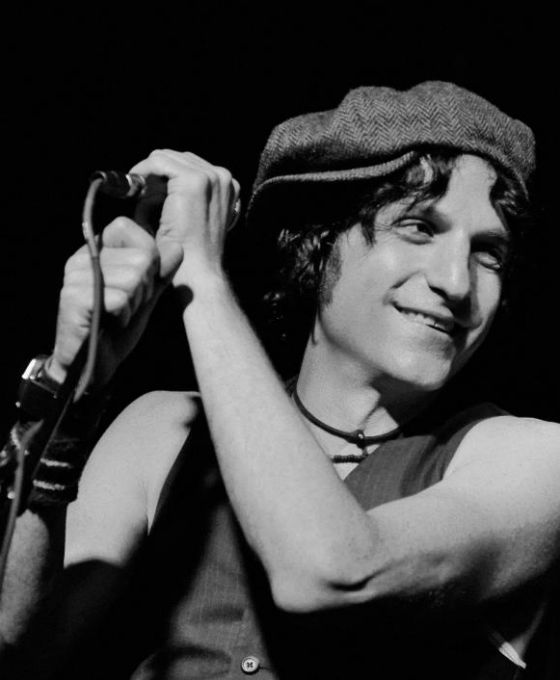
Malin performing at The Bowery Ballroom in New York City in 2015.

Stateside fans were eventually able to purchase the album The Fine Art of Self Destruction in January 2003. Tour dates followed, both in America and the United Kingdom. Malin contributed to two cover albums: first he covered "Hungry Heart" for Light of Day: A Tribute to Bruce Springsteen, and then he recorded a cover of the Clash's "Death Or Glory" on the tribute White Riot Vol. 2: A Tribute to The Clash. He also picked up a nomination for the Shortlist Music Prize.

By November 2003 he was back in the studio recording tracks for his second album, The Heat, which was released in June 2004, accompanied by a string of tour dates on both sides of the Atlantic.

Malin has also collaborated with Ryan Adams & Johnny T to form the band the Finger (the pair adopted the pseudonyms "Irving Plaza" and "Warren Peace" respectively) who released two EPs which were later collected into the album We Are Fuck You.

Malin's album Glitter in the Gutter was released on March 20, 2007. It also featured a cover of the Replacements' "Bastards of Young" and a duet with Bruce Springsteen on "Broken Radio." A music video was also made to accompany "Broken Radio."

Malin released a 'live in the studio' album, Love It To Life, in November 2007 on the One Little Indian label for sale in the UK. Recorded live at Gigantic Recording Studios in New York City, it featured songs from his previous albums. He used the title again in 2010 for an album of new material.

Malin released a cover album on April 7, 2008 entitled On Your Sleeve, containing covers of songs by, among others, the Ramones, Sam Cooke, Neil Young and the Hold Steady, as well as a studio recording of a long-time live favourite, Fred Neil's "Everybody's Talkin'."

In 2010, Malin formed a band called Jesse Malin and the St. Mark's Social and released a new album called Love It To Life; the title comes from a quote by Joe Strummer. Featuring a more rock-oriented approach, the album's first single was "Burning The Bowery" and next single was "All The Way From Moscow."

Malin was also a judge for the 9th annual Independent Music Awards.

In December 2010, Malin, along with members of Green Day, formed the band Rodeo Queens. They released one song, along with a video, called "Depression Times".

Malin has also done some film work and he had a role in Martin Scorsese's Bringing Out The Dead (1999). He did the music supervision on the documentary Burning Down the House: The Story of CBGB and he was associate producer with Bad Brains from DC. In addition he hosted the show "New York Nights" on Sirius XM's Spectrum with John Varvatos from 2011 to 2014. Malin released New York Before The War in March 2015 through One Little Indian / Velvet Elk Records.

Since 2019, Malin has been a DJ on Litte Steven's Underground Garage. Malin released his eighth studio album Sunset Kids in August 2019. The album was produced by Lucinda Williams and Tom Overby, and features performances by Lucinda Williams, Billie Joe Armstrong, and Joseph Arthur. On April 10, 2020, Malin released the single "Backstabbers" which was recorded during the sessions for Sunset Kids and appeared on his 2021 double album, Sad and Beautiful World.

On September 20, 2024, Silver Patron Saints: The Songs of Jesse Malin was released. The tribute and benefit album, released a year after Malin's spinal stroke, features twenty-two cover songs of Malin's solo work along with songs by his previous bands D Generation and Heart Attack by a wide range of artists and friends. The album was preceded by the singles "Prisoners of Paradise" by Bleachers, "Black Haired Girl" by Green Day's Billie Joe Armstrong and "She Don't Love Me Now" by Bruce Springsteen.

Malin performed for the first time since his 2023 spinal stroke when he appeared on CBS Saturday Morning on September 21, 2024, where he performed “State of the Art,” “Meet Me at the End of the World” and a new song, “Argentina”. Malin was also interviewed. Malin subsequently performed two benefit shows at the Beacon Theatre in New York City on December 1 and 2, 2024. He was joined by Lucinda Williams, Elvis Costello, Jakob Dylan, Butch Walker, J Mascis, Eugene Hütz, members of Counting Crows, the Hold Steady, and Alejandro Escovedo, among others. The December 1st performance was co-hosted by Michael Imperioli and Mary-Louise Parker. Proceeds from the performances went toward his Sweet Relief Musicians Fund.

On April 17, 2026, Malin released the two song single "Hollywood Forever" which features the title track and a cover of The Clash's "Rudie Can't Fail". The single was released as a tribute to Howie Pyro whose wish for when he died was to be buried in the Hollywood Forever Cemetery.

== Personal life ==
On June 14, 2023, Malin announced that he had suffered a rare spinal stroke on May 4, 2023, that left him paralyzed from the waist down. Malin and friends were commemorating the one-year anniversary of the passing of his D Generation bandmate Howie Pyro when he felt a burning pain in his lumbar region that slowly migrated to his hips, through his thighs, and into his heels. Malin then collapsed onto the floor of a restaurant and has since been unable to walk. Malin was carried by Murphy's Law singer Jimmy G from the restaurant into the hallway of a nearby apartment where an ambulance was called to take him to Mount Sinai Hospital. Malin said doctors do not understand his condition and are not sure of his chances of walking again. Malin said "The reports from the doctors have been tough, and there's moments in the day where you want to cry, and where you're scared. But I keep saying to myself that I can make this happen. I can recover my body." Malin has undergone various spinal procedures, and his days include three rounds of physical therapy and rehabilitation, with a short-term goal of teaching him to move his body without the use of his legs. Due to extensive medical bills, his manager and various friends have set up a donation campaign to help him pay for his medical expenses.

On December 11, 2023, Malin gave an update to Rolling Stone on his health saying that "I have a lot of anxiety and insomnia. Your mind goes into some dark places. But I just have to keep a positive outlook and believe." Malin said that he has been undergoing a strict daily rehabilitation routine that combines hours of intense physical therapy with stem-cell treatments at a clinic in Buenos Aires, Argentina. Malin made a grueling 12-hour flight from New York to South America after being admitted to a facility that offers what he calls an "alternative road" to recovery. Malin said he wanted to preserve his privacy, disappear from public life, and focus solely on his recovery, saying, "But everyone's been so great and supportive that I felt it was time to let people know what's up," and cited the donations made to his recovery fund and the proceeds from special merch drops that are helping to pay for his medical and living expenses. "I am getting some strength back in my legs, but it moves a lot slower than I would like. I don't want to portray it like I'm ready to do the James Brown splits onstage. I definitely have a long way to go, but I'm blessed and so grateful for the amazing fans and friends that I have", Malin said. As of September 2024, Malin is able to walk with the assistance of a walker and he has been undergoing physical therapy and stem-cell treatments.

In April 2025, Malin announced that he will tell his life story in the off-broadway musical titled Silver Manhattan which will be written by Malin. The production was to open in New York at the Gramercy Theatre in September 2025 with performances on select Saturdays once a month from October to January 2026 and will be part concert, part play that will document Malin's life including his efforts to recover from his stroke. Silver Manhattan opened in February 2026 at the Bowery Palace to run for a month. Malin also said that he has been working on his memoir and the writing began months before his stroke. Malin said that still after two years he still has no feeling in his legs and undergoes regular physical therapy however in recent months there have been glimmer of hope Malin said. “There’s some things I see progress in. I made it a goal to want to be able to find a way to stand up, even if it was just for a song. To find a way to get my body up onto that mic stand to sing. And we worked at that for six months.”

In 2026, Malin reigned as King Neptune of the 2026 Coney Island Mermaid Parade alongside Queen Mermaid Rickie Lee Jones.

== Discography ==
=== Solo ===
- 2002: The Fine Art of Self Destruction
- 2004: The Heat
- 2007: Glitter in the Gutter
- 2008: On Your Sleeve
- 2010: Love It to Life
- 2015: New York Before the War
- 2015: Outsiders
- 2019: Sunset Kids
- 2021: Sad and Beautiful World

EPs

- 2000: So-Low Demos April 2000
- 2000: 169
- 2003: The Wendy EP
- 2015: Hardcore Feeling
- 2015: Hardcore Feeling II
- 2017: Meet Me at the End of the World

Live albums

- 2004: Messed Up Here Tonight
- 2008: Mercury Retrograde
- 2024: Chasing The Light

Singles

- 2002: "Xmas"
- 2003: "Queen of the Underworld"
- 2003: "Wendy"
- 2003: "Happy Holidays 2003"
- 2003: "Messed Up Here Tonight"
- 2004: "Since Your in Love"
- 2004: "Mona Lisa"
- 2007: "Don't Let Them Take You Down"
- 2007: "Tomorrow, Tonight"
- 2007: "Broken Radio" (feat. Bruce Springsteen)
- 2008: "In the Modern World"
- 2008: "Leaving Babylon"
- 2008: "Russian Roulette"
- 2010: "Burning the Bowery"
- 2010: "All the Way from Moscow"
- 2010: "The Archer"
- 2010: "Black Boombox"
- 2014: "I Heard You Paint Houses"
- 2014: "Addicted"
- 2015: "You Know It's Dark When Athiests Star to Pray"
- 2015: "She Don't Love Me Now"
- 2015: "Turn Up the Mains"
- 2015: "San Francisco"
- 2016: "Edward Hopper"
- 2016: "Whitestone City Limits"
- 2017: "Meet Me at the End of the World"
- 2017: "Fox News Funk"
- 2017: "London Rain"
- 2017: "Revelations / Thirteen"
- 2019: "Strangers & Thieves" (feat. Billie Joe Armstrong)
- 2019: "Chemical Heart"
- 2019: "Room 13" (featuring Lucinda Williams)
- 2019: "When You're Young"
- 2019: "Meet Me at the End of the World Again"
- 2020: "Shane" (feat. Lucinda Williams)
- 2020: "Dead On" (feat. Lucinda Williams)
- 2020: "Backstabbers"
- 2020: "Todd Youth (feat. H.R.)"
- 2020: "Ameri' Ka"
- 2020: "Hungry Heart"
- 2020: "Sally Can't Dance"
- 2021: "The Way We Used to Roll"
- 2021: "Crawling Back to You"
- 2021: "Tall Black Horses"
- 2021: "Before You Go"
- 2021: "State of the Art"
- 2022: "Keep on Burning"
- 2022: "Broken Radio '22" (feat. Bruce Springsteen)
- 2022: "Brooklyn (Walt Whitman in the Trash)"
- 2022: "Xmas, Etc."
- 2022: "Riding on the Subway '22"
- 2022: "Downliner (Afterglow Version)"
- 2022: "Wendy (Tail Lights Fade)"
- 2022: "TKO (DTK)"
- 2023: "The Fine Art of Self Destruction (Lonely Process)"
- 2024: "Argentina"
- 2024: "I & I Survive" (with H.R.}
- 2026: "Hollywood Forever"

Tribute album

- 2024: Silver Patron Saints: The Songs of Jesse Malin

=== Heart Attack ===
- 1981: God Is Dead EP
- 1983: Keep Your Distance ep
- 1984: Subliminal Seduction EP
- 2001: The Last War '80–'84
- 2002: Toxic Lullabies: 1980-1984

=== D Generation ===
- 1994: D Generation
- 1996: No Lunch
- 1998: Prohibition EP
- 1999: Through the Darkness
- 2016: Nothing Is Anywhere

=== Bellvue ===
- 2001: To Be Somebody

=== The Finger ===
- 2002: We Are Fuck You

=== Rodeo Queens ===
- 2010: "Depression Times" (Malin with Green Day)
