= The Best of Times (album) =

Studio album by Murphy's Law
- Released: 1991
- Studio: Studio 55 (Los Angeles)
- Genre: Hardcore punk
- Label: Relativity
- Producers: John "Norwood", Phillip "Fish" Fisher

Murphy's Law chronology
Back with a Bong (1989)	The Best of Times (1991)	Good for Now EP (1991)

The Best of Times is an album by the New York City hardcore punk band Murphy's Law, released in 1991.

== Production ==
The album was produced by Fishbone's John "Norwood" and Phillip "Fish" Fisher. It explored the ska/brassier side of the band's sound. The songs are about weed, beer, and fun. "Harder Than Who" takes a shot at the tough-guy posturing in the hardcore scene. "Ebony and Ivory" is a cover of the Paul McCartney and Stevie Wonder song.

== Critical reception ==
Professional ratings
Review scores
Source	Rating
AllMusic	3/5 stars
Chicago Tribune	2.5/4 stars
The Encyclopedia of Popular Music	3/5 stars

The Washington Post opined that the "eclecticism does provide for more variegation than is common on hardcore punk albums, but the band is still most convincing on such high-speed, relatively unadorned rockers as Freaktown' and the title song." The Chicago Tribune noted that "a hearty horn section punctuates and adds a wallop to the guitar assault." The Deseret News noted the "muscular riff-rock approach."

Paul Henderson of AllMusic stated, "Murphy's Law usher in the '90s with a reinvigorated blast of their debauchery-laced brand of comedic punk. Stylistically, Murphy's Law makes quite a jump on The Best of Times. The band did dabble in skacore long before it exploded, but was always pretty much a flat-out hardcore unit in the '80s. The Best of Times finds Jimmy Gestapo and friends combining funk, reggae, ska, and hardcore into their own distinct brew, shedding any dogmatic restrictions applied to their ilk in the '80s."

== Track listing ==
1. "Intro" - 1:05
2. "The Best of Times" - 2:23
3. "Big Spliff" - 2:27
4. "Freaktown" - 2:37
5. "Tight" - 2:10
6. "Did You Play War?" - 1:59
7. "Ebony and Ivory" - 3:01
8. "Harder Than Who" - 2:12
9. "Car Song" - 2:02
10. "Beer Bath" - 2:06
11. "Sock It to Me Santa" - 1:52
12. "1%" - 2:30
13. "Burnt Toast" - 1:57
14. "Hemp for Victory" - 0:55
