= Murphy's Law (band) =

American hardcore band

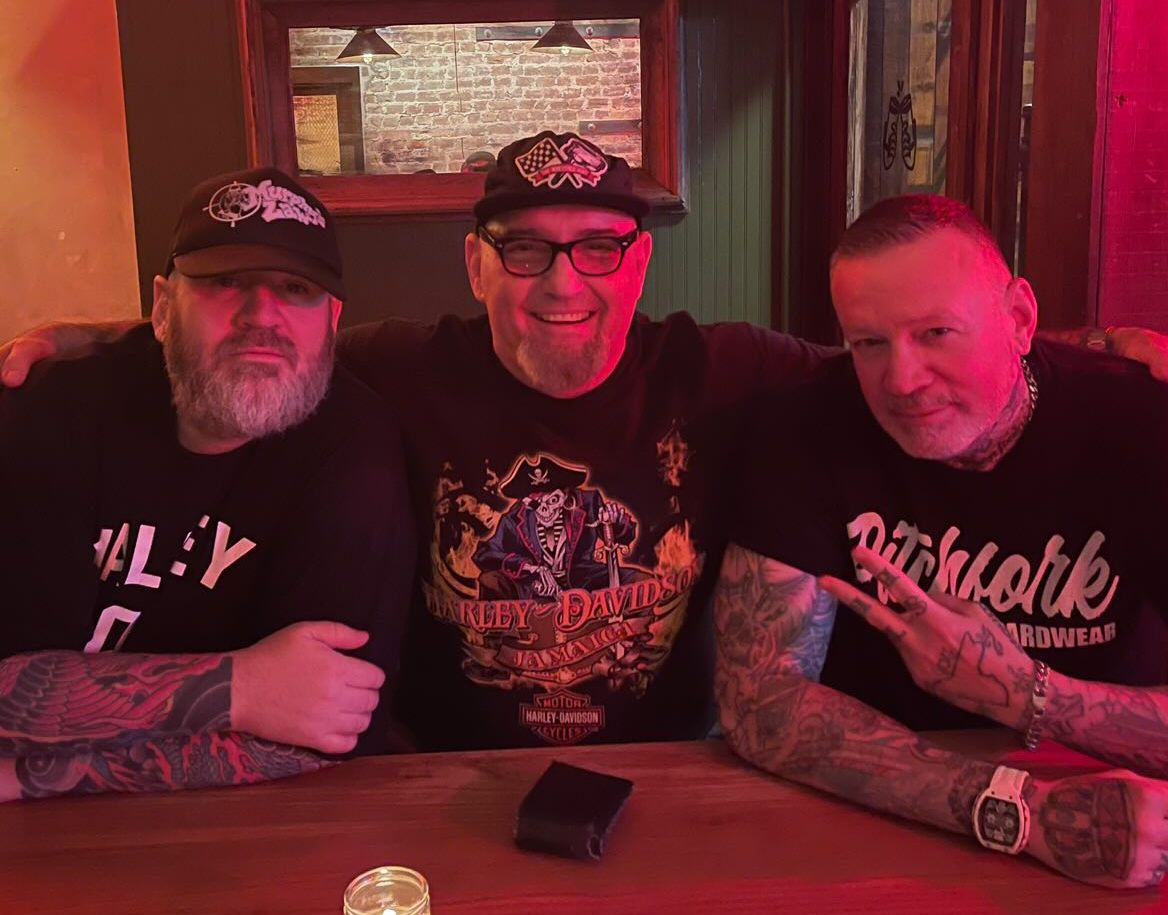
- Big B, Jimmy Drescher, Walter "Monsta" Ryan

Background information
- Origin: New York City, U.S.
- Genres: Hardcore punk, skate punk, crossover thrash
- Years active: 1982–present
- Labels: Profile, Relativity, We Bite, Artemis, NYHC Tattoos, I Scream, Reflex/Wolfpack
- Members: Jimmy Drescher; Joe James; Larry The Hunter; Gary Bennett; Big B; Walter "Monsta" Ryan
- Past members: See below
- Website: murphyslawnyhc.com

Murphy's Law is an American hardcore punk band from New York City, formed in 1982. Vocalist Jimmy Drescher remains the only founding member of the band, and the lineup has consisted of numerous musicians who have performed with a diverse selection of musical acts across multiple genres, such as Skinnerbox, Danzig, The Bouncing Souls, Mucky Pup, Dog Eat Dog, Hanoi Rocks, Fishbone, Agnostic Front, Warzone, the Cro-Mags, D Generation, New York Dolls, Joan Jett & the Blackhearts, The Slackers, Thursday, Skavoovie and the Epitones, White Trash and Glen Campbell. Over the course of their career, Murphy's Law has released five albums, the last of which, The Party's Over, was released in 2001.

== History ==
=== 1980s ===
Murphy's Law was formed in 1982 in Astoria Queens, by lead vocalist Jimmy Drescher. He claimed he started the band for "Girls, free beer, and getting into clubs for free. Ya know, what every other girl and guy does it for. And for glory, it was just fun and something to do." The group played their first show at a New Year's party on January 1, 1983, with Reagan Youth, MDC, and Heartattack, originally formed as just a one off however the band received positive feedback from the crowd so they ended up playing more shows and writing more material. Their band name is a direct reference to the adage Murphy's Law.

The groups ever changing lineup has contained guitarists such as Todd Youth, Alex Morris, and Jack Flanagan; bassists Pete Martinez, Chuck Valle, and Dean; and drummers Doug E. Beans and Eric Arce.

The bands original drummer was Ray Parada, however Drescher claims that Harley Flanagan of The Stimulators. Recorded live at CBGBs in 1983, they released their first demo Bong Blast. Throughout the year the band also began to tour regularly in the New York area, and by 1984 and 1985 they began playing shows all around the US.

Murphy's Law's self-titled debut album was released in 1986. Following the tour in support of the album Murphy's Law returned to the studio to record their second album Back with a Bong!, which was released in 1989 on Profile Records, and subsequently re-released on Another Planet Records in 1994, with the previous self-titled album on the same disc. The music video for "Panty Raid" also garnered the band recognition after appearing on MTV's Headbangers Ball.

The band underwent a transformation, with Jimmy Drescher being the only remaining member. Alex Morris had been replaced on guitar by Todd Youth – previously of fellow New York City hardcore bands, Agnostic Front and Warzone, and later of Danzig. Chuck Valle replaced Pete Martinez on bass, and Doug E. Beans took over drumming duties from Petey Hines. In 1986, the group toured the East Coast opening for acts such as Agnostic Front, Nuclear Assault and the Circle Jerks.

The members of the Beastie Boys were fans of Murphy's Law fans and in the spring of 1987 they invited them to open for their US Licensed to Ill tour along with Fishbone and later Public Enemy. This tour made Murphy's Law the first New York Hardcore band to play arena shows. In 1989, Murphy's Law continued touring extensively and opened for the Red Hot Chili Peppers on their Mother's Milk tour. During the summer of that year, they opened for the Ramones.

=== 1990s ===
In May and June 1990, Murphy's Law went on an extended European tour. Stylistically, Murphy's Law made a jump on The Best of Times (1991). While the band dabbled in skacore long before it exploded, The Best of Times combined funk, reggae, ska, and hardcore. The album was produced by Fishbone's John "Norwood" Fisher and Philip "Fish" Fisher, containing guest instrumentation from several members of Fishbone. From November 29 to December 15 of that year, Murphy's Law went on tour in support of the album alongside Mucky Pup & B'Zerker. That year also seen them release a three song Ep titled Monster Mash, which contained a cover of the novelty song Monster Mash. The band continued the touring into 1992 including a European tour with Take The Cake.

Following a busy touring schedule the previous years, Murphy's Law took a break from performing live in most of 1993. The band went on to tour Europe in 1994, and it was during this tour that the band's bassist Chuck Valle had stepped away briefly to travel to Los Angeles, California to tour with Sugartooth as their sound engineer; however, during the tour, he was murdered following an altercation. In 1995. the band toured Japan along with playing multiple US shows as well, Also in 1995, the group released an EP through We Bite Records titled Good for Now.

Dedicated was released by Another Planet on March 19, 1996. The label had already picked up the rights to their previous material from Profile Records and in 1994 had released a split CD with the self-titled and Back with a Bong! albums on the same disc. Dedicated was produced by Daniel Rey, who also wrote "Greenbud" on the album. It follows 1993's Good for Now EP and the 1991 studio album The Best of Times. Dedicated was dedicated to former bass player, Chuck Valle, who was killed in a knife related incident in 1994. His picture appears on the back page of the CD inlay and a picture of a tattoo inscribed with the words "In Memory of Chuck" appears on the jewel case inlay. From July to late October of that year the band went on their US Beer & Water tour. AllMusic wrote on the album stating "Dedicated is another collection of Murphy's Law's weed-obsessed, couch potato punk anthems like "Greenbud" and "Bag of Snacks."The catchier selections, like "Dysfunctional Family," make the album worthwhile, and longtime fans should be pleased." The grouped continued touring in the US and Europe throughout the rest of the 1990s.

=== 2000s ===
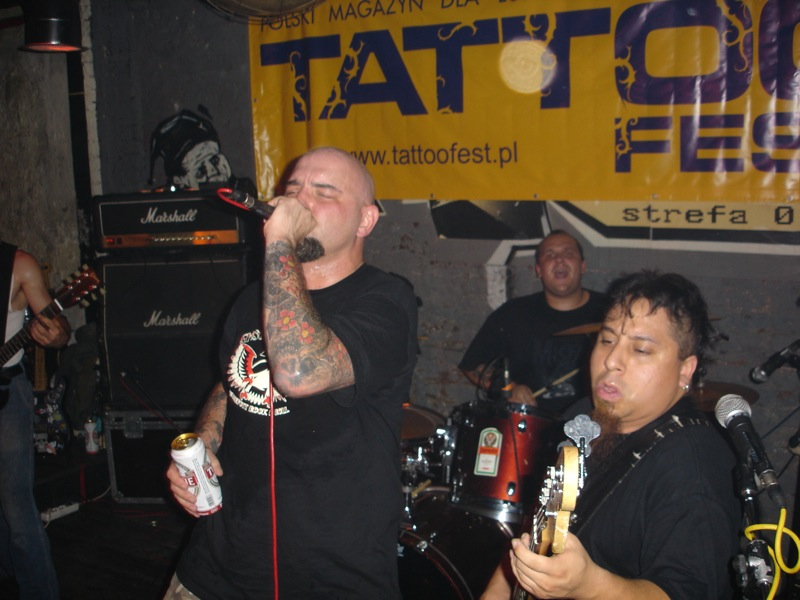
Murphy's Law live in Poland 2007

In 2000, Artemis Records reissued Best of Times/Good for Now into a compilation album. The following year in 2001 the bands fifth studio album The Party's Over was released, it was distributed by Artemis Records and produced by Daniel Rey. From late April to early June of 2001, Murphy's Law toured the US alongside Clutch and Vision Of Disorder. In 2002 Reflex/Wolfpack Records released a European vinyl pressing of The Party's Over, the group also released their first live album Beer, Smoke, and Live through P.O.P. Records. Throughout the year the band toured in the US and Japan.

In 2002, the band appeared in Matthew Barney's film Cremaster 3 along with Agnostic Front. In 2004, the song "Vicky Crown" appeared in a music video montage featuring Nick Mondo in the game Backyard Wrestling 2. In 2008, the song "A Day in the Life" was featured, as well as Jimmy G. himself as the DJ of Liberty City Hardcore (L.C.H.C) radio station in the action videogame Grand Theft Auto IV.

In 2005 the group released a cover album Covered through NYHC Tattoos Records. In the Summer of 2006 Murphy’s Law toured alongside Gorilla Biscuits and Comeback Kid. In 2007, Murphy's Law toured Japan they also they also held a US headlining tour in the fall of that year. From late May to early June of 2008 the group held a US headlining tour, they also took part in a benefit show on September 27, for Dr. Tom and Walter "Monsta" Ryan of Subzero and Merauder.

=== 2010s ===
On April 12, 2010, Murphy's Law announced in a MySpace blog entry that they were working on a sixth studio album as well as a DVD and vinyl reissues of their back catalog. On May 4, 2011, it was announced that Murphy's Law were signed to I Scream Records, who were scheduled to release the band's first studio album of original material since 2001's The Party's Over, as well as reissues of their back catalog. The reissued albums were released on CD, digital download, and vinyl in 2014 with previously unreleased bonus tracks. On September 18, 2011, Murphy's Law performed at Air Jam 2011 at Yokohama Stadium in Japan in front of 30,000 people. In September of 2013 Murphy’s Law went on their first ever Australian tour, they also went on an extensive European tour in the Summer of 2014. Throughout 2014, the bands entire discography was re-released via I Scream Records.In 2016 the group began the year playing show in Texas and Florida with Sick of it All and joined the band on their US 30th anniversary tour.

On May 19, 2018, Murphy's Law was one of four classic punk/hardcore acts to play the Prudential Center in Newark, New Jersey, along with Harley Flanagans band, Suicidal Tendencies, and the original Misfits. Later that year on June 23, lead singer Jimmy Drescher was hospitalized and underwent surgery to remove his gallbladder. The Mighty Mighty Bosstones, Sheer Terror, Killing Time held a concert to raise funds for his medical bills. Following Drescher's recovery the band began touring again in late 2019, including the annual Jimmy G b day bash. Which is a yearly concert the band host on Drescher's birthday which takes place during the Rock Off concert cruise in New York. In June of that year Drescher revealed that the group had been working on a concept Ep with all of the song titles being band names, such as Agnostic Front and Sick of it All.

=== 2020s ===
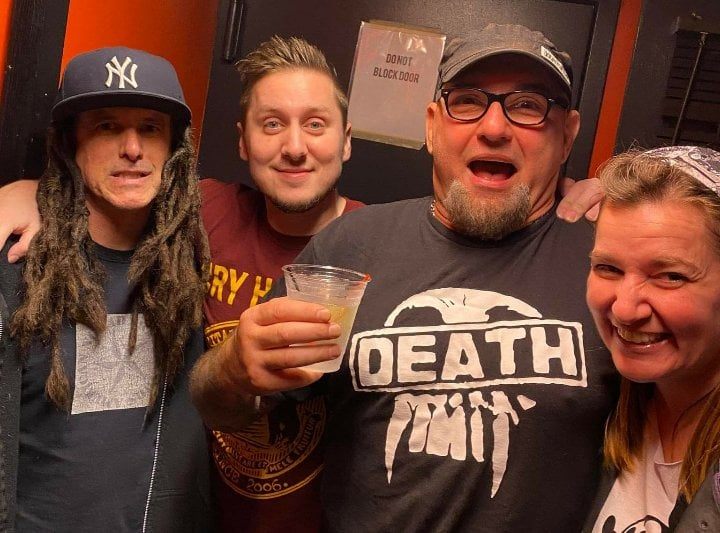
Murphy's Law in 2021

On April 24, 2021 Murphy's Law played a large concert at Tompkins Square Park in New York, alongside Madball and Bloodclot. In 2022 Murphy's Law held a winter and spring tour along with a Midwest tour.

In July 2023, Murphy's Law opened for the Adolescents, and later opened for Rancid in Boston in September. After touring in the Fall of 2023, Murphy's Law joined Agnostic Front on a December tour, they also played their 40th anniversary show at The Kingsland on December 31, with support from Urban Waste, The Stress, and CRIKE. In the Summer of 2024 Murphy’s Law once again teamed up with Agnostic Front for the "New York Blood Summer tour." The US leg of the tour took place in the Spring of 2025.

After two decades of no new music from Murphy's Law in April 2025, the band announced that they were in the studio recording a new album. Their first song in 24 years, "Go, Jimmy, Go!", was released digitally as a single in October 2025. They have signed with Trust Records to release their upcoming album, and the label will also be re-releasing the band's entire back catalog. The group also contributed to the Motörhead tribute album Killed By Deaf covering their song "Stay Clean" which was released on October 31, 2025.

In May of 2026, Murphy's Law embarked on an Australian tour and their first ever New Zealand tour. During an interview on May 13, Drescher provided an update on the bands new album stating "we have almost two albums done already" he also noted that the albums were entirely funded by him with no label support. They are scheduled to tour Europe in the fall of 2026, alongside The Bones.

== Artistry ==
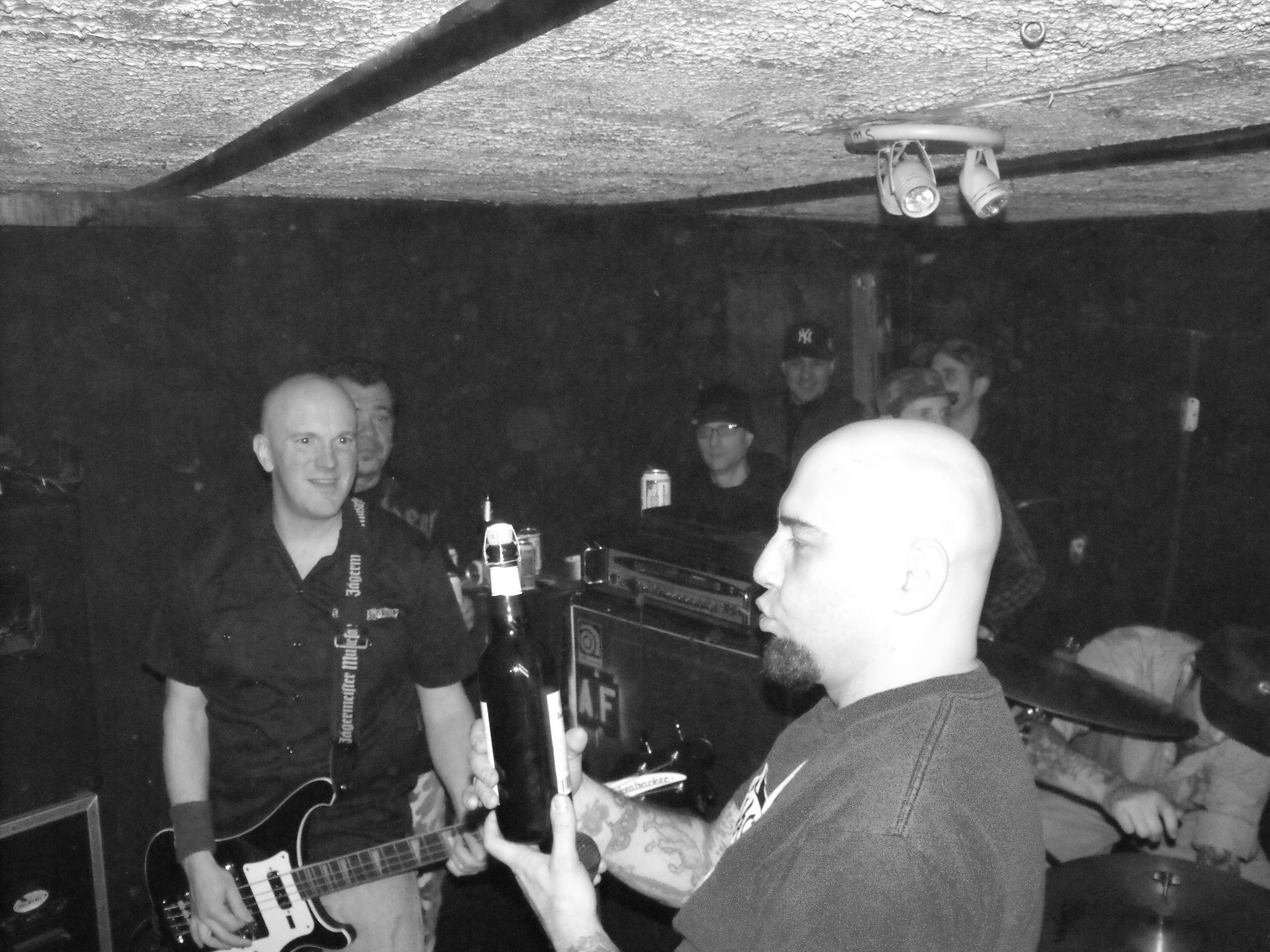
Murphy's Law Live 2009

The bands style has been referred to as hardcore and a fine line between obnoxious skatepunk and metal. However the Los Angeles Times have described the band as "a serious dose of energy into thrash, punk, speed metal and ska, amid intermittent showers--is sort of a musical extrapolation of Fudd's First Law of Opposition, which states, If you push something hard enough, it'll fall over."

Unlike many of their New York hardcore contemporaries, Murphy's Laws lyrical themes do not touch upon political and social issues, instead focusing on less serious and humorous topics. Jimmy Drescher has stated "Most of the good stuff is written by other people, but the dumb, funny shit is written by me." Another thing that sets them apart from other hardcore bands is their use of instruments such as the bagpipes, saxophone and Banjo which they incorporate into both their songs and live performances.

in a 1992 interview Drescher spoke on their lyrical themes stating:

Everybody just jumps around and screams and vents their emotions. We have a set beginning and a set ending; in between, whatever happens happens. We're sort of like a public service. The kids appreciate it; we're sort of like a breath of fresh air. Just leave your politics outside and listen to some loud, grungy music. Our music is about beer, food and sex--life, that's it.

In a separate interview when asked if he ever felt push back due to not trying to fit into the "tough-guy" mold as many other NYC hardcore bands Drescher added:

No. Never. We didn't want to fight at shows. We wanted to have fun. We were different and that made us stand out. But we were accepted from day one because we were different from the bands that surrounded us.

Murphy's Law have also garnered a reputation for their live shows, and has been described as one of the premier party bands. One of the staples of their live shows is bringing multiple cases of beer on stage and throwing cans out into the audience during show.

== Members ==
=== Current members ===
- James Drescher – lead vocals (1982–present)
- Joe James – guitars
- Larry The Hunter – guitars
- Gary Bennett – guitars
- Walter "Monsta" Ryan – drums
- Big B – bass

=== Past members ===
==== Guitars ====
- Alex "Uncle Al" Morris (1982–1986)
- Todd Youth (Danzig, Chrome Locust, Agnostic Front, Warzone, D Generation, Glen Campbell) (1989–1991, 1996) (died 2018)
- Felipe Lithgow (2007-2012)
- Jack Flanagan (The Mob) (1993)
- Ace Von Johnson (Madcap, The Generators, Duane Peters Gunfight)
- Christopher Kerrigan aka "Chris Redd" (Lockdown, Those Hated Hearts, Necktangle, Revenge of the Dragon)
- Chris Shannon (Demonspeed)
- Dan Nastasi (Dog Eat Dog, Nastasee, Mucky Pup, Kings Never Die)
- Erick "Epick" Hartz (Los Dudes, The Boilermakers, Zen Butcher, The Lobrows)
- Jason Stickney (CHUD)
- Jason Burton (Not A Part of It)
- Joe Porfido (Inhuman, Agnostic Front)
- Johnny Waste (Urban Waste, Major Conflict)
- Rick Bacchus
- Sean Kilkenny (Dog Eat Dog, Mucky Pup, Harley's War, Stigma) (died 2021)
- Tim Miller (Blanks 77, Broken Heroes)
- Rod Martino (Ruder Than You)
- A.J. Novello (1997)
- Kane Kelly (die Strömms)

==== Bass ====
- Adam Mucci (1982)
- Pete Martinez (1986)
- Chuck Valle (Ludichrist, Dripping Goss) (1989–1993)
- Felipe Lithgow(2019-2022)
- Dean Rispler (1996)
- Aaron "White Owl" Collins (Skarhead, White Trash, Butterbrain, Hash)
- Anthony Di Masi (The Unopposed)
- Ben "Tucks" Orenstein (U.N. Posse)
- Brian Ellingham aka Pico Da' Bass (F.O. the Smack Magnet)
- Christian Hoffmeister
- Dug Donohoe
- Eddie Cohen
- "Genghis" Jon Carrier
- Ghoul Man
- J.R.
- Phil Caivano (Shrapnel, Blitzspeer, Monster Magnet)
- Ron Delux (The Turnbucklers, Unlucky 3, Cinema Nine)
- Russel Iglay (Underdog)
- Sal Villanueva
- Sami Yaffa (Hanoi Rocks, New York Dolls, Joan Jett & the Blackhearts)
- Tommy Kennedy
- Tommy Sick (DFA, Zyris, SIB)

==== Drums ====
- Harley Flanagan (Cro-Mags, The Stimulators) (1982)
- Petey Hines (Cro-Mags, Handsome) (1986)
- Doug Beans (The Functional Idiots, Mearth, The Montalbans, Hellride 102, Aggravated Assault, Defiance) (1989–1991)
- Michael McDermott (Skinnerbox, The Bouncing Souls, Joan Jett And The Blackhearts, The Kilograms) (1993)
- Eric "Goat" Arce (Crown of Thornz, Skarhead, Merauder, The Misfits) (1996)
- Chris Ara (Zombie Vandals, The Krays)
- Dan Lettieri
- Donny Didjits (Time Bomb 77, Anti Heros, A.P.A, Liberty)
- Frank Lema (Half-Life, Freakmode)
- Jay Colangelo (American Standard)
- John “Solar Skin” Sullivan
- Nick Angeleri
- Quincy Kirk (Graves, Broken Heroes, Headwound)
- Steve Barna (Fake Your Death)
- Todd Irwin
- Tucker Rule (Thursday)
- Vincent Alva rest in peace.
- Pokey (1997)

==== Horns ====
- Angelo Moore – saxophone (1989–1991)
- Christopher Dowd – trombone (1989)
- Walter Kibby III – trumpet (1989)
- Scott Mayo – saxophone (1991)
- Reggie Young – trombone (1991)
- Fernando Pullam – trumpet (1991)
- Jeff "Django" Baker (Skinnerbox, Stubborn All-Stars) – trombone (1993)
- Danny Dulin (Skinnerbox, Stubborn All-Stars) – trumpet (1993)
- Ben Jaffe (Skavoovie and the Epitones, The Diamond Mines, Eli "Paperboy" Reed and the True Loves) – saxophone
- D-Robb (D-Robb and The Shots) – trombone
- Jeremy "Mush One" Mushlin (The Slackers) – trumpet, vocals
- Johnny Banks – trumpet
- John Mulkerin – trumpet
- Joseph Bowie – trombone
- Raven (Seaton "Chuck" Hancock III) – saxophone

==== Banjo ====
- Ian Meredith (Clean & Nasty, The Scrub-Ups)

== Discography ==
=== Studio albums ===
- Murphy's Law (1986) Profile Records
- Back with a Bong! (1989) Profile Records
- The Best of Times (1991) Relativity Records
- Dedicated (1996) Another Planet
- The Party's Over (2001) Artemis Records

=== Live albums ===
- Bong Blast (1983) Spliff Records
- Beer, Smoke, and Live (2002) P.O.P. Records

=== Cover albums ===
- Covered (2005) NYHC Tattoos Records

=== Re-Issued albums ===
- Murphy's Law / Back with a Bong! (1994) Another Planet – split CD
- The Best of Times / Good for Now (2000) Artemis Records – split CD

=== EPs ===
- Good for Now EP (1994) We Bite Records

=== Music videos ===
- "Panty Raid" (1989)
- "What Will the Neighbors Think?" (1996)
- "Vicky Crown" (2001)

=== Singles ===
- "Monster Mash" (1991) Relativity Records – CD single
- "My Woman from Tokyo" (1995) – Japan only 7" split single
- "What Will the Neighbors Think?" (1996) Another Planet – 7" single
- "Genkika" (1996) – Japan only 7" split single
- "Kansai Woman" (1996) – Japan only 7" single
- "Quality of Life" (1998) NG Records – 7" split single
- "Go, Jimmy, Go" (2025)

=== Compilation albums ===
- How to Start a Fight (1996) Side One Dummy Records
- Show & Tell - A Stormy Remembrance of TV Themes (1997) Which? Records
- Creepy Crawl Live (1997) Another Planet
- Music to Kill For (1998) Triple Crown Records
- City Rockers: A Tribute to the Clash (1999) Side One Dummy Records
- Never Mind The Sex Pistols: Here's The Tribute (2000) Radical Crown Records
- Under the Influence - A Tribute to the Clash, the Cure, and the Smiths (2001) Triple Crown Records
- The World Wide Tribute to the Real Oi Volume 2 (2002) I Scream Records
- Jager Music Volume 2 (2002) jagermusic.com Records
- Warped Tour Compilation (2002) Side One Dummy Records
- The Best (2005) NYHC Tattoos Records
- "Stay Clean" Killed By Deaf covering (2025)
