= Cro-Mags discography =

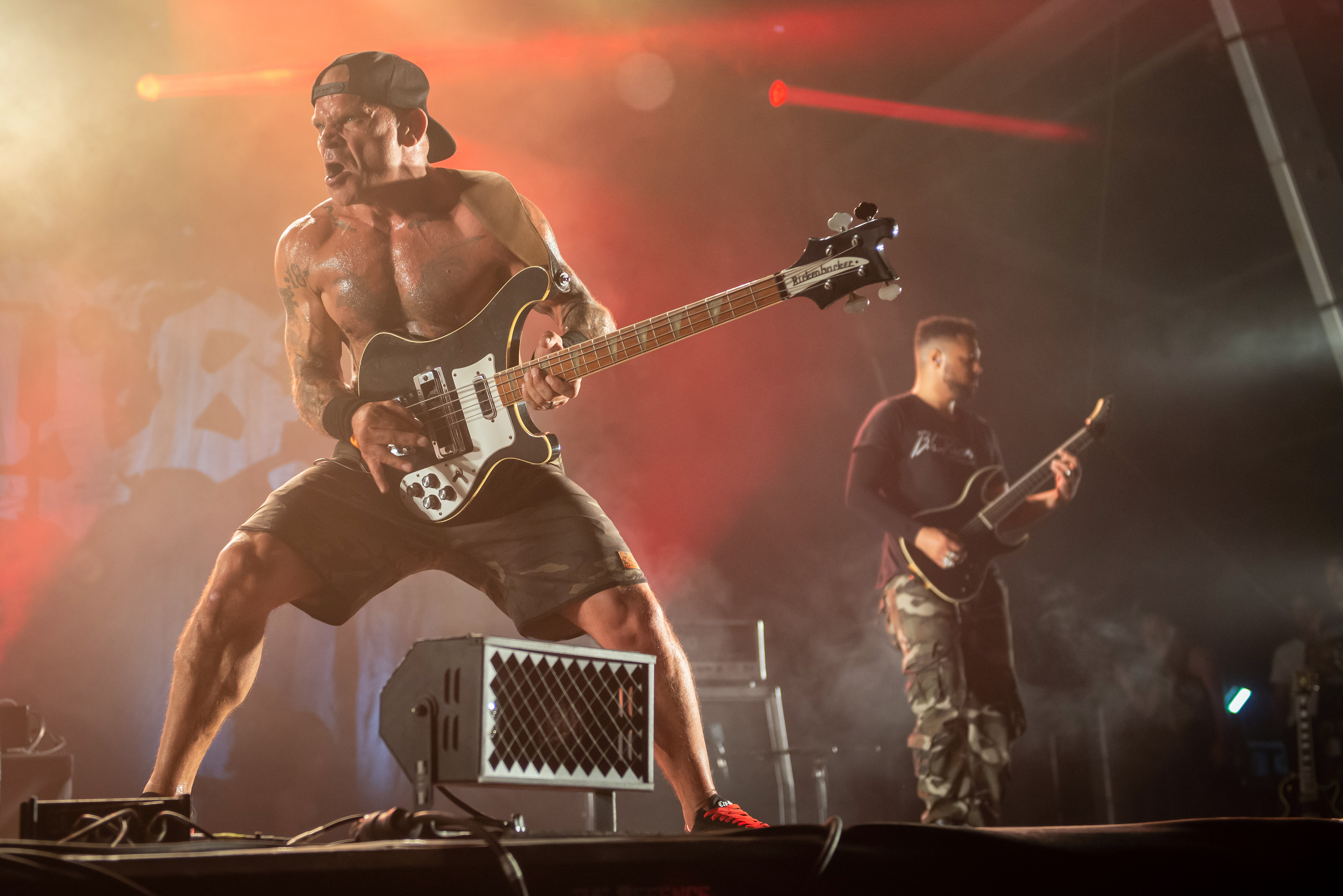
- Studio albums: 6
- Extended plays: 1
- Live albums: 1
- Compilation albums: 1
- Video albums: 1
- Music videos: 4
- Demo albums: 1

The discography of Cro-Mags, a New York hardcore band, consists of six studio albums, one compilation album, a live album, a DVD, a demo, and four music videos.

== Studio albums ==
Year	Album details
1986	The Age of Quarrel: Released: 1986; Label: Profile; Formats: LP, CS, CD
1989	Best Wishes: Released: 1989; Label: Profile; Formats: LP, CS, CD
1992	Alpha Omega: Released: 1992; Label: Century Media; Formats: LP, CS, CD
1993	Near Death Experience: Released: 1993; Label: Century Media; Formats: LP, CS, CD
2000	Revenge: Released: 2000; Label: Cargo; Formats: CD
2020	In the Beginning: Released: 2020; Label: Mission Two Entertainment; Formats: CD, digital Download

== EPs ==
Year	Album details
2019	Don't Give In: Released: 2019; Label: Victory Records; Formats: LP, CS, CD
2019	From the Grave: Released: 2019; Label: Victory Records; Formats: LP, CS, CD

== Compilation albums ==
Year	Album details
2006	Twenty Years of Quarrel and Greatest Hits: Released: March 21, 2006; Label: Cro-Mag Recordings; Format: CD

== Live albums ==
Year	Album details
1994	Hard Times in an Age of Quarrel: Released: 1994; Label: Century Media; Format: CD

== Video albums ==
Year	Album details
2007	Final Quarrel: Live at CBGB 2001: Released: August 28, 2007; Label: Cro-Mags Recordings; Format: DVD

== Demo albums ==
Year	Album details
1985	Before the Quarrel: Released: 1985; Label: Self-released; Format: CS (reissued on LP and CD some years later)

== Music videos ==
Year	Song	Album	Notes
1986	"We Gotta Know"	The Age of Quarrel	
1989	"Crush The Demoniac"	Best Wishes	
1992	"The Paths of Perfection"	Alpha Omega	

In 1988, Cro-Mags appeared in a movie called The Beat as "Iron Skulls", performing the songs "It's the Limit" and "Hard Times".
