= Near Death Experience (Cro-Mags album) =

Studio album by Cro-Mags
- Released: 1993
- Recorded: 1993
- Studio: Normandy Sound, Warren, Rhode Island; Unique Studios, New York City, New York
- Genre: Crossover thrash
- Length: 34:26
- Label: Century Media Records
- Producer: Harley Flanagan

Cro-Mags chronology
Alpha Omega (1992)	Near Death Experience (1993)	Hard Times in an Age of Quarrel (1994)

Professional ratings
Review scores
Source	Rating
AllMusic	1.5/5 stars

Near Death Experience is the fourth album by New York hardcore band Cro-Mags. It was released in 1993 on Century Media Records. In 2015, German record label Demons Run Amok Entertainment re-issued it on vinyl. It is, to date, the last album to feature vocalist John Joseph and guitarist Doug Holland. Songs on the album deal with topics such as environmentalism, anti-abortion, and spirituality. After the release of this album, the Cro-Mags had gone on hiatus for some time, experienced more lineup changes, and would not release their next album, Revenge, until seven years later.

== Track listing ==
No.	Title	Length
1.	"Say Good-Bye to Mother Earth"	5:03
2.	"Kali-Yuga"	6:23
3.	"War on the Streets"	3:27
4.	"Death in the Womb"	2:16
5.	"Time I Am"	4:42
6.	"Reflections"	4:21
7.	"Near Death Experiences"	3:33
8.	"The Other Side of Madness"	4:41
Total length:		34:26

== Personnel ==
- John Joseph – lead vocals
- Doug Holland – lead guitar
- Gabby Abularach – rhythm guitar
- Harley Flanagan – bass, backing vocals
- Dave di Censo – drums
