= Alpha Omega (Cro-Mags album) =

Studio album by Cro-Mags
- Released: May 12, 1992
- Recorded: 1991
- Studio: Normandy Sound, Warren, Rhode Island
- Genre: Crossover thrash; tough guy hardcore
- Length: 46:31
- Label: Century Media
- Producer: Harley Flanagan

Cro-Mags chronology
Best Wishes (1989)	Alpha Omega (1992)	Near Death Experience (1993)

Professional ratings
Review scores
Source	Rating
AllMusic	2/5 stars

Alpha Omega (also referred to as Alpha-Omega or Alpha III Omega) is the third album by the New York hardcore band Cro-Mags. It was released in 1992 on Century Media Records. In 2013, German record label Demons Run Amok Entertainment re-issued it on vinyl. It is the band's second album to feature vocalist John Joseph, who had been expelled from the band prior to the recording of their previous album Best Wishes (1989) and then rejoined in 1991.

According to founding guitarist Parris Mayhew, he wrote most of Alpha Omega with former guitarist Rob Buckley. However, neither Mayhew or Buckley played on the actual recording, and the claim has been disputed by Flanagan and others.

== Release and reception ==
In an AllMusic review, Vincent Jeffries said "This partial assemblage of the classic Cro-Mags lineup features bassist Harley Flanagan and singer John "Bloodclot" Joseph together again after years of separation. The two musicians had last joined forces on the band's seminal hardcore debut, The Age of Quarrel. Doug Holland (guitars), Gabby (guitars), and Dave DiCenso (drums) fill out the lineup for this, the group's third studio recording. With music penned by Flanagan and original guitarist Parris Mayhew, this 1992 release delivers a steady stream of straightforward metal. Alpha-Omega bears only a small resemblance to the frenzied, more destructive style that embodied '80s East Coast hardcore and on which the Cro-Mags' reputation was solidly built. Standout tracks 'The Other Side of Madness' and 'The Paths of Perfection' have a relatively subdued, melodic texture that furthers the band's career-long gravitation away from its hardcore roots. While certainly a decent offering, this record falls short of its creators' best work."

== Track listing ==
No.	Title	Length
1.	"See the Signs"	4:07
2.	"Eyes of Tomorrow"	3:28
3.	"The Other Side of Madness (Revenge)"	6:02
4.	"Apocalypse Now"	8:08
5.	"Paths of Perfection"	3:05
6.	"Victims"	4:41
7.	"VII" (instrumental)	1:18
8.	"Kuruksetra"	4:11
9.	"Changes/Cro-Mags Jam"	12:11
Total length:		46:31

== Personnel ==
Cro-Mags

- John Joseph – lead vocals
- Harley Flanagan – bass, backing vocals
- Doug Holland – lead guitar
- Gabby Abularach – rhythm guitar
- Dave di Censo – drums

Production

- Recorded in 1991 at Normandy Sound, Warren, Rhode Island
- Produced by Tom Soares
- Engineered by Tom Soares
