= The Stimulators =

American punk rock band

- Origin: New York City, New York, U.S.
- Genres: Punk rock, proto-New York hardcore
- Years active: 1978–1983
- Label: ROIR
- Past members: Denise Mercedes; Patrick Mack; Anne Gustavsson; Nick Marden; Harley Flanagan
- Website: stimulatorsnyc.com

The Stimulators were an American punk rock band from New York City. Although they have a limited discography, they are notable for being consistently cited as an important transitional band between the late-1970s New York City punk rock scene and New York hardcore, and for being the musical entry point for future Cro-Mags founder Harley Flanagan.

== History ==
Denise Mercedes grew up in Manhattan and Queens, New York City, raised by a longshoreman father who played flute and piano. Teaching herself to play guitar, she became infatuated with punk rock after having seen the Damned play their first New York City show at CBGB. Denise attended the gig with a friend who worked for Stiff Records and has recalled of the event "literally the second they started to play, my life changed." She elaborated that punk rock made creativity and attitude more important than "being able to play like Jimi Hendrix."

Determining that her local punk rock scene was beginning to age and soften ("there was a pause" in the vitality of NYC's punk landscape, Mercedes remembers), and after a tryout as a guitarist for a side-project of the Damned's Rat Scabies didn't pan out, Mercedes set out to form her own band called the Stimulators, named after a piece of equipment used in acupuncture.

Denise booked live dates for her band before she had a singer. She resolved this discrepancy by visiting Max's Kansas City and asking an attractive patron at the bar, Patrick Mack, whether he had experience singing, and whether he would like to be in a band, to which his answers were "no" and "yes" respectively. Mack, inspired by Iggy Pop, would go on to be noted as a wild, flamboyant, front man. Mack would also become the band's lyricist. Adding bassist Anne Gustavsson (later replaced by Nick Marden), the last step was procuring a drummer.

Drum tryouts with 1970s punk notables Johnny Blitz and Jerry Nolan failed to fill the vacant position, so Denise turned to her 11 year old nephew. Harley Flanagan had been raised in a Bohemian, rock 'n' roll environment. He had a book of poetry entitled Stories & Illustrations by Harley (Charlatan Press), with a foreword written by family friend Allen Ginsberg, published when he was nine. His mother was acquainted with members of the Velvet Underground/New York Dolls-era New York Rock scene, and Harley had frequently accompanied his aunt Denise to CBGB and Max's Kansas City. He proved to be an energetic and capable drummer.

The Stimulators, whose eclectic original lineup, now complete, featured two women, a homosexual man, and a child, began to attract a following from young city music fans that were still drawn to the initial spirit of punk rock from which the original CBGB bands had largely distanced themselves. Fanzine editor Jack Rabid, who was a regular at punk shows at Max's Kansas City, noticed for the first time many young overtly punk-looking and behaving attendees at the establishment, at Stimulators gigs. This gave him comfort as nearly 30 year old neighbor Richard Hell would tease him when seeing his own punk outfits, declaring that it "was over". Rabid would in 1980 publish the first issue of The Big Takeover, named after a Bad Brains song. The periodical originally focused on The Stimulators, but is published to this day covering punk rock generally.

The Stimulators played regularly at city rock venues, including CBGB, Irving Plaza, Paradise Garage, Tier 3, Danceteria, A7, and Max's Kansas City, and also toured both nationally, and in Ireland. They shared bills with bands like Madness, Stiff Little Fingers, the Cramps, Bad Brains, James Chance & the Contortions, Teenage Jesus & the Jerks, the B-52's, Richard Hell, Pure Hell, the Blessed, the Mad, Suicide, The Rattlers, The Necros, and The Circle Jerks. In 1980 they recorded the single "loud, fast, rules!", and in 1982 released a live album of the same name, recorded live in Raleigh, North Carolina. The phrase "loud, fast, rules!" came from bassist Nick Marden (who like Flannagan, had been around rock music from early childhood, his aunt Joan Baez having taken him to Monterey Pop when he was 8). Marden wrote the phrase on the back of his punk leather jacket, surrounded by band names, and when noticed by his bandmates, was used as a title for a song Mercedes and Mack had already written. The title became something of a punk rock catchphrase in its time.

Patrick Mack died in 1983 of complications associated with AIDS, ending the Stimulators' run.

Mercedes, Flanagan, and Marden have played reunion shows with the latter on vocals, notably opening for their old friends the Bad Brains on October 11, 2006, one of the last ever shows at CBGB. Mercedes and Marden recorded a song called "song about murder", which is about Hilly Kristal and CBGB, and references events in the Stimulators' heyday. The duo continue to collaborate on projects, but Mercedes has stated are unlikely to revive the Stimulators moniker: "that happened... you can't go home again."

In 2018, Mercedes teamed up with Marden and former singer of the iconic 1960s girl group The Crystals, LaLa Brooks to work on a new project called Dae Lilies.

Mercedes has been a feature writer for the entertainment site Music Realms since 2016.

Denise has been the lead guitarist of an all-girl Mötley Crüe tribute band called Girls Girls Girls since 2006 and is still actively playing with the band.

== Musical style ==
In his review of the Stimulators' only album, a reviewer from AllMusic noted that the music "exist(s) in the gray area between two eras of punk rock... the latter days of New York Punk's first wave (...and) the more manic and aggressive hardcore style". It was the reviewer's opinion that Patrick Mack's vocals were better suited for the former. He also noted that Denise Mercedes had "guitar heroine" ambition, playing flashier solos than are typical in punk rock. He acknowledged the band's reputation as "one of the better bands on the early-'80s New York scene", but lamented that, in his opinion, the recording did not capture this adequately.

Undead/Misfits/Whorelords guitarist Bobby Steele claims that Mercedes was one of the best ever punk guitarists, and one of the few true lead guitarists in the genre (this ability is also displayed in her more recent work in heavy metal tribute bands). Steele also asserts that the Stimulators were a formidable live act, and states that their recorded legacy does not reflect this.

== Legacy ==
In his book American Hardcore: A Tribal History, scene historian Steven Blush stated that the "Stimulators triggered the rise of NYHC. In 1980-1981, 50 or so ragtag kids attended their shows at Max's, CBs, or TR3, but those kids formed the roots of the NYHC scene." Blush also noted that the Stimulators befriended Washington D.C.'s Bad Brains, who proceeded to make NYC their second home, another hugely influential development in the history of NYHC. The two bands would be featured in cassette-only label ROIR's 3rd (Stimulators) and 4th ever releases. Both are featured on that label's compilation New York Thrash, considered a quintessential document of early east-coast hardcore punk.

Blush's observations were seconded by numerous NYHC notables, as interviewed in the oral history book NYHC by Tony Rettman (Bazillion Points). Paul Cripple of Reagan Youth testified that "in all honesty, Denise Mercedes, the guitarist of the Stimulators, was the catalyst for New York Hardcore". Doug Holland of Kraut and Cro-Mags added that "I can tell you 10 dudes off the top of my head who have thriving punk bands today because they went to see the Stimulators." Artist Sean Taggart, who got his start designing album covers for hardcore artists, compared The Stimulators' transitional role between scenes in NYC to what the Germs accomplished for the Los Angeles area punk scene(s). Jesse Malin of Heart Attack and D Generation noted that the presence of the adolescent Harley Flannagan in the band was a seminal influence on the underaged future hardcore set. Word got around that one of their peers was playing in the band, and by hook or crook they would attend. Malin suggests this may have been an influence on the all-ages shows that became a characteristic of hardcore punk.

Harley Flanagan returned from the Stimulators' 1980 Ireland tour with a shaved head and a skinhead identity, which proved influential to what became the New York Hardcore scene of the 1980s. Harley came up with the name Cro-Mags while still playing in the Stimulators and founded the band in 1982/83 when he wrote, played all instruments, sang and recorded the first Cro-Mags demos re-released by MVD 2018. Along with peers such as Vinnie Stigma and Jimmy Gestapo, Harley would go on to be one of the leading figures of the internationally notable 1980s New York hardcore scene. The first live performance for an embryonic form of Cro-Mags, with a lineup featuring Harley (under the name "Disco Smoothie") on bass, and members of Even Worse and Crucial Truth, took place at the Peppermint Lounge in 1980, opening for the Stimulators.

Denise Mercedes may have had some specific impact as well. Bobby Steele asserts that her instrumental lead intro parts may have influenced the likes of her friends in the Damned. She has occasionally been cited as a notable punk rock female and punk rock Hispanic. She has continued to play guitar, for all-female heavy metal cover bands such as the Black Sabbath-themed Bible Black, and as Mercedes Mars in the Mötley Crüe tribute Girls Girls Girls.

== Former band members ==
- Denise Mercedes – guitar
- Patrick Mack – vocals
- Anne Gustavsson – bass
- Nick Marden – bass
- Harley Flanagan – drums

== Discography ==
=== Albums ===
Year	Title	Label	Format	Other information
1982	Loud Fast Rules!	ROIR	Cassette/LP/CD	Recorded live

=== Singles ===
Year	Title	Label	Format	Other information
1980	"Loud Fast Rules!"	Stimulator	7" single	b/w "Run, Run, Run"

=== Compilations ===
Year	Title	Label	Format	Other information
1998	New York Thrash	ROIR	CD/LP/Cassette	Reissue from landmark 1982 cassette-only release
