= Revenge (Cro-Mags album) =

Studio album by Cro-Mags
- Released: January 18, 2000
- Recorded: 1998–1999
- Genre: Crossover thrash
- Length: 31:07
- Label: Cro-Mag Recordings
- Producer: Harley Flanagan, Parris Mitchell Mayhew

Cro-Mags chronology
Hard Times in an Age of Quarrel (1994)	Revenge (2000)	In the Beginning (2020)

Professional ratings
Review scores
Source	Rating
AllMusic	link
Kerrang!	4/5 stars

Revenge is the fifth studio album by New York hardcore band Cro-Mags. It was released in 2000 on their own label Cro-Mag Recordings and was the band's first studio album in seven years, as well as their first release with guitarist Rocky George (formerly of Suicidal Tendencies) and its first without vocalist John Joseph since 1989's Best Wishes. As he did on Best Wishes, bassist Harley Flanagan handled the vocals on this album. Revenge was also the Cro-Mags' last full-length studio album until the release of In the Beginning in 2020.

== Release and reception ==
In an AllMusic review, Patrick Kennedy said "Appearing nearly a decade after the previous album, the largely disappointing Near Death Experience, Harley Flanagan resuscitated the Cro-Mags -- at least temporarily -- and issued a few albums in 2000. Revenge, a disc of studio material from the newest incarnation (also with original guitarist Parris Mayhew and Suicidal Tendencies' Rocky George), is surprisingly good hardcore. Fortunately for long-time fans, the Cro-Mags, with Harley singing in place of the deposed John Joseph, who were often considered the toughest of the New York acts, have not mellowed with age, nor followed any crossover metal/rap hybrid trends. In fact, Revenge is stone-solid, and as beefy as a slab of Angus. What's most peculiar is the sudden emergence of more melodic aspects beneath the imposing tough-guy veneer. This is melodic hardcore along the lines of early-'80s Misfits, and bears immediate sonic resemblance to Walk Among Us. Assuredly, Flanagan's vocals are menacing, which, of course, is what one would expect and probably hope for.".

== Track listing ==
All songs written by Flanagan and Mayhew.

No.	Title	Length
1.	"Premeditated"	2:22
2.	"Jones"	1:50
3.	"Can You Feel?"	4:19
4.	"My Life"	2:59
5.	"Tore Up"	2:16
6.	"Without Her"	3:13
7.	"Pressure Drop"	2:41
8.	"Open Letter"	1:49
9.	"Don't Forget"	2:24
10.	"Steal My Crown"	2:26
11.	"These Streets"	2:21
12.	"Fireburn"	2:30
Total length:		31:07

== Personnel ==
- Harley Flanagan – bass, vocals
- Rocky George – lead guitar
- Parris Mitchell Mayhew – rhythm guitar
- Dave di Censo – drums
