= A7 (bar) =

Music venue in New York City

Coordinates: 40.7639°N 73.9817°W

A7 was a club in New York City that between 1981 and 1984, was a main location of the New York hardcore scene. The tiny space was located on the southeast corner of East 7th Street and Avenue A in Manhattan's East Village, and operated by Dave Gibson and Doug Holland. The venue hosted fast punk bands such as The Stimulators and The Violators. Slowly, a hardcore scene of initially about 100 persons formed around the club which spawned bands like Agnostic Front, Antidote, Cro-Mags, Heart Attack, Kraut, Reagan Youth, The Mob, The Abused and Urban Waste who played the A7 regularly, some of them weekly.

Although the venue was putting on performances from lesser known New York punk rock and hardcore bands like False Prophets and The High and the Mighty, it became the scene's unofficial headquarters after Bobby Steele began performing at the venue due to being banned from CBGB and Max's Kansas City. It also played host to a fertile jazz and reggae scene during the 1980s.

The success of the club led to the owner opening the 2+2 Club on the intersection of East Houston Street and 2nd Avenue in the summer of 1982. This venue was larger and could host bigger performances.

== Niagara ==
In 1997, the venue reopened and is now called Niagara. Bands continually perform in the room that used to be A7. In October 2013, a plaque was hung in the room, marking the space's history.
