= The Age of Quarrel =

Studio album by Cro-Mags
- Released: September 1986
- Recorded: 1986
- Studio: Eastside Studios (New York City, New York)
- Genre: Hardcore punk
- Length: 33:44
- Labels: Profile Records; Another Planet (1994 reissue)
- Producer: Chris Williamson

Cro-Mags chronology
The Age of Quarrel (1986)	Best Wishes (1989)

The Age of Quarrel is the debut studio album by the New York hardcore band Cro-Mags. It was originally released on then-independent Profile Records in September 1986. It was subsequently re-released by Another Planet in 1994, along with the band's 1989 follow-up album, Best Wishes, on the same disc.

The video for "We Gotta Know" (directed by guitarist Parris Mayhew) received airplay on MTV at the time (during their alternative music show 120 Minutes and later on Headbangers Ball) and was one of the first-ever clips on MTV to feature slam dancing and crowd surfing.

== Overview ==
Most of the songs are executed at speed with vocals from John Joseph, which inspired many sound-a-likes. However, "Malfunction", "Seekers of the Truth", and "Life of My Own" are slower songs that foreshadowed the more metallic influences on their next project, the crossover thrash bracketed Best Wishes.

The title refers to Kali Yuga, this term originating from the Sanskrit language can be translated into the "Age of Quarrel", "Age of Deception", or "Age of Illusion". Kali Yuga is the fourth age (and current) of the world in the Sanatan Dharma or Hindu tradition, characterized by general degradation, spiritual degeneration, and illusion.

Parris Mayhew has credited the Canadian progressive rock trio Rush as a direct inspiration on several riffs on the album.

The image on the front cover of the album is a photograph taken during the Castle Romeo H-bomb test in 1954.

Following the albums release Cro-Mags served as main support for Motörhead on the US leg of their Orgasmatron Tour. For the first half of 1987 the band toured the US, during the end of the year the band toured Europe it was during this tour that Joseph parted ways with the band again, leaving Flanagan to become the bands lead singer.

Following its release the album suffered from unauthorized re-releases, sketchy reissues, and lack of distribution. However in 2011, John Joseph authorized an official reissue via Mightier Than Sword Records. Since the album’s release many labels have been trying to obtain the rights to the record. In 2021, the album was listed for a record store day event released by the Rock hotel label; however, this was quickly denounced by the band as none of the original members authorized the re-release.

Flanagan has stated that since the album's original release none of the band members have ever received any royalties from the album. He has also tried to reunite the original lineup and regain the rights via the Copyright Reversion Act, however those efforts never amounted to anything.

On August 6, 2026, the band released a re-recorded version of the song "World Peace" which will be featured on The Age of Quarrel: 40 Years of Quarrel, a complete re-recording of the album which is scheduled for a November 13, 2026, release date.

== Writing and songs ==
The album was primarily written by cofounders Parris Mayhew and Harley Flanagan. The opening track "We Gotta Know" is Flanagan’s version of a fusion idea and was greatly inspired by the Bad Brains "I Against I". Flanagan claims he came up with the song while the rest of the band were on break and when they came back they put it all together in five minutes. "World Peace" was one of the first songs both Mayhew and Flanagan collaborated on it was their take on a Motörhead song. "Show You No Mercy" was a song written by John Joesph about street fighting in the Lower East Side. Both "Seekers of the Truth" and "Malfunction" have a more metal style and sound with "Malfunction" begin about Joesph’s psyche at the time. "Street Justice" is about Eric Casanova beating up Matt from a band called Hellbent.

Flanagan stated in his 2017 autobiography:

A lot of the lyrics had undertones of spiritual knowledge, because the materialistic aspects of life are all going to crumble, and then we’re going to be left with nothing. “As this age progresses, and gets more and more degraded...” wasn’t just inspired by our street experiences, but also from reading the Bhagavad Gita.

Flanagan also revealed in his autobiography that during the recording process the band never tried to intentionally write anything metal or hardcore. They instead just tried to write songs that they liked and viewed as up to a certain standard.

== Reception and legacy ==
Professional ratings
Review scores
Source	Rating
AllMusic	4.5/5 stars
PunkNews	4.5/5 stars

Critical reception to The Age of Quarrel has been met with positive reviews and ratings. Vincent Jeffries of AllMusic awards it four-and-a-half out of five stars and claims in hindsight that "the Cro-Mags helped define the East Coast hardcore movement with their now legendary debut, Age of Quarrel." He later states that "Age of Quarrel is loaded with hardcore classics like 'World Peace,' 'We Gotta Know,' and 'Street Justice.' On these cuts and throughout the record, Mayhew presents what were at the time cutting-edge post-Motörhead punk/metal riffs, and the entire group execute their roles with passion, dexterity, and extreme focus. It's practically impossible to understand or appreciate New York hardcore without first spending time listening to Age of Quarrel." Decibel called the album a "genre landmark" and PunkNews dubbed it "inarguably one of the most influential hardcore albums of all time." When ranking it among the best hardcore albums of all time in 2018, NME wrote "it inspired a generation of youths to invest themselves in hardcore, and had an impact easily rivalling that of the nuclear test that adorns its front cover."

In 2005, The Age of Quarrel was ranked number 274 in Rock Hard magazine's book of The 500 Greatest Rock & Metal Albums of All Time. In 2007, Hit Parader named Age of Quarrel the 4th greatest hardcore album of all time. whilst LA Weekly dubbed it the eighth best hardcore album in 2013. The Village Voice ranked the album at number 2 on its 2013, list of the "Top 20 New York Hardcore and Metal Albums of All Time". Noisecreep also listed it as one the "Top 10 New York Hardcore Albums".

In 2006, Revolver ranked in the 68th greatest metal album of all time. In 2018, the publication ranked it the 22nd Greatest Punk Album of All Time stating "it combined the belligerent thrash of NYC hardcore with the metallic heaviness of Motörhead and Black Sabbath." In 2023, the publication also put the album on their list of the 10 Best Hardcore Albums of the 1980s, and in 2024, readers of the publication voted the album as the greatest NYHC album of all time. In 2025, it was ranked second on a similar poll of the best hardcore albums of all time by Alternative Press.

Earth Crisis frontman Karl Buechner said that watching the video of "We Gotta Know" was "the spark that set off" his love for hardcore punk music and, during a 1996 interview, he would describe The Age of Quarrel as "still the greatest hardcore album of all time". Jamey Jasta of Hatebreed stated that the song "Life of My Own" inspired him to become a musician and named The Age of Quarrel one of the most crucial albums in hardcore's history.

Cro-Mags performed the songs "It's the Limit" and "Hard Times" in a 1988 film called The Beat as "Iron Skulls".

"It's the Limit" was featured in the 2008 video game Grand Theft Auto IV. It was featured on the "LCHC" radio station, referring to Liberty City Hardcore.

== Track listing ==
Lyrics by John Joseph, Harley Flanagan, and Eric Casanova. Music by Parris Mitchell Mayhew and Harley Flanagan.

No.	Title	Length
1.	"We Gotta Know"	3:24
2.	"World Peace"	2:13
3.	"Show You No Mercy"	1:58
4.	"Malfunction"	3:43
5.	"Street Justice"	1:33
6.	"Survival of the Streets"	1:06
7.	"Seekers of the Truth"	4:03
8.	"It's the Limit"	1:43
9.	"Hard Times"	1:40
10.	"By Myself"	2:35
11.	"Don't Tread On Me"	1:20
12.	"Face the Facts"	1:41
13.	"Do Unto Others"	1:50
14.	"Life of My Own"	2:53
15.	"Signs of the Times"	2:03
Total length:		33:44

== Personnel ==
Cro-Mags

- John Joseph – vocals
- Parris Mitchell Mayhew – lead guitar
- Doug Holland – rhythm guitar
- Harley Flanagan – bass
- Mackie Jayson – drums

Production

- Recorded in 1986 at Eastside Studios, New York City
- Produced by Chris Williamson
- Engineered by Steve Remote
- Mixed by Chris Williamson and Steve Remote
- Digitally transferred at Aura Sonic Ltd, New York City

Additional production

- Reissue remastered by Alan Douches at West Westside Music
