= Harley Flanagan =

American musician

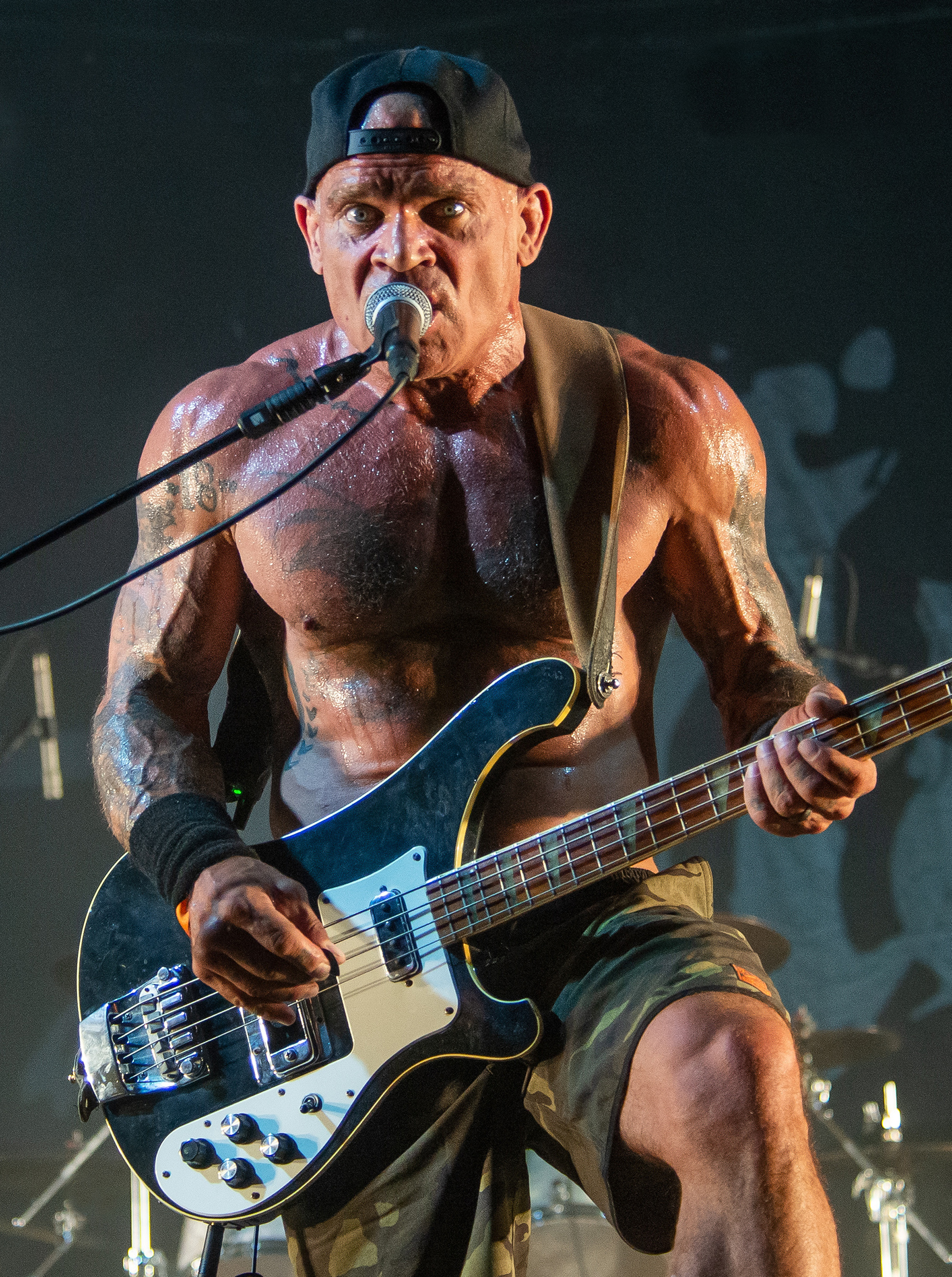
- Flanagan performing with Cro-Mags in 2022

Background information
- Born: Harley Francis Flanagan; March 8, 1967 (age 59); San Francisco, California, U.S.
- Origin: New York City, New York, U.S.
- Genres: Hardcore punk, crossover thrash, punk rock
- Occupation: Musician
- Instruments: Bass, vocals
- Years active: 1978–present
- Member of: Cro-Mags
- Formerly of: The Stimulators; Murphy's Law; White Devil; Sămsära; Harley's War
- Website: harleyflanagan.com

Harley Francis Flanagan (born March 8, 1967) is an American musician, known for being the bassist and vocalist of the hardcore punk band the Cro-Mags. Flanagan began his musical career at age 11 in 1978, drumming for the New York punk band the Stimulators alongside his aunt Denise Mercedes. By the early 1980s, he was a prominent figure in the developing New York hardcore scene, helping to found the Cro-Mags in 1981 and Murphy's Law in 1982. Although technically he has not remained a constant member of Cro-Mags, having left and rejoined the band on a few occasions, Flanagan is the only member to appear on all of their studio albums.

== Early life ==
Flanagan is the son of Tex Flanagan and Rose "Rosebud" Feliu-Pettet. His father was a petty criminal and his mother was a memoirist, actress, and prominent figure in Greenwich Village's bohemian culture, being featured in films such as Piero Heliczer's Dirt (1963) and Harry Everett Smith's Mahagonny (1980). Feliu-Pettet was featured in various works by Andy Warhol and was the muse for a number of the poets in the Beat Generation. He grew up in New York's Lower East Side.

When he was nine years old, Flanagan published a book of poetry and drawings written when he was seven years old, with a foreword written by family friend Allen Ginsberg. At age 11, Flanagan was the drummer for New York punk band the Stimulators. The bands guitarist was Flanagan's aunt Denise Mercedes. Flanagan officially dropped out of school in seventh grade.

== Music career ==
=== Cro-Mags ===
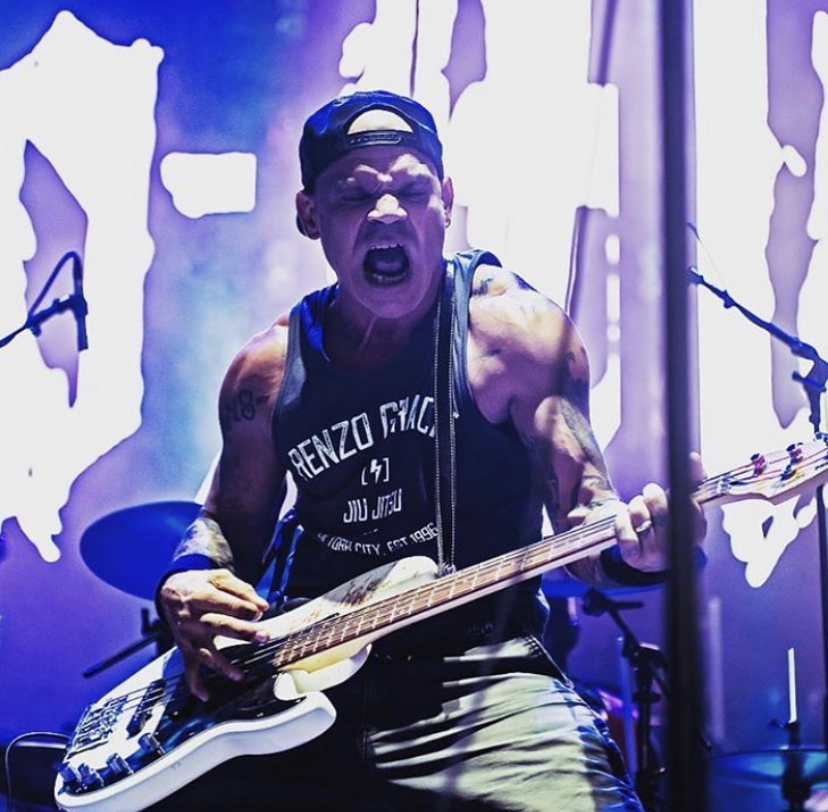
Flanagan performing live in 2019

Flanagan has claimed that he formed the Cro-Mags in 1980 with guitarist Dave Stein, drummer Dave Hahn and vocalist John Berry and that the band's first performance was at the Peppermint Lounge opening for the Stimulators the same year. He thought the band was not ready to debut using their real name, so instead performed as Disco Smoothy. After this performance, the group disbanded and in 1982–1983, Flanagan recorded four tracks in Songshop Studios in New York City with Denise Mercedes of the Stimulators, the tracks set to be released by Rat Cage Records but issues regarding management prevented the project to come to fruition. He then recruited Eric Casanova on vocals, before meeting Parris Mayhew in 1983, who then joined as guitarist, along with drummer Mackie Jayson. This final story by Flanagan is mainly supported by John Joseph in his 2007 autobiography The Evolution of a Cro-Magnon, but Joseph states the band formed in 1981 and that he was the band's vocalist prior to Berry, but left prior to the Peppermint Lounge performance because he thought the name they were performing under was not serious enough. The group went on to release their first album The Age of Quarrel in 1986, and went on to release five more albums until 2002 when Flanagan stepped away from the band to take care of his first child who was born that same year.

Following his departure John Joseph and Jayson began playing shows under the Cro-Mags name in 2008 and would not let Flanagan rejoin. After nearly 17 years Flanagan then started his own version of the Cro-Mags and on June 28, of that year they released their first new music in twenty years, three new songs "Don't Give In," "Drag You Under" and "No One's Victim."

In August 2026, Flanagan revealed that he will be stepping away from touring regularly, he noted this was due to both his age and not wanting to spend as much time on the road anymore.

=== Murphy's Law ===
In 1982 Flanagan helped form another prominent New York hardcore band Murphy's Law alongside lead singer Jimmy Dreschler. Flanagan was only in the band for a year however he played the drums on their 1983 demo Bong Blast.

=== White Devil ===
In 1994 Flanagan started a side project with former Cro-Mags bandmate Parris Mayhew called White Devil. The group released one album in 1995. However they disbanded shortly after with Mayhew being frustrated with Flanagan putting the Cro-Mags logo on all the bands promotional material and flyers. As Mayhew wanted to separate himself from the Cro-Mags.

=== Harley's War ===
During his time away from the Cro-Mags Flanagan played in a band called Harley's War alongside the likes of Rocky George, Crazy Jay Skin and Walter Ryan. During his time with the group they released two albums and went on multiple tours.

=== Solo career ===
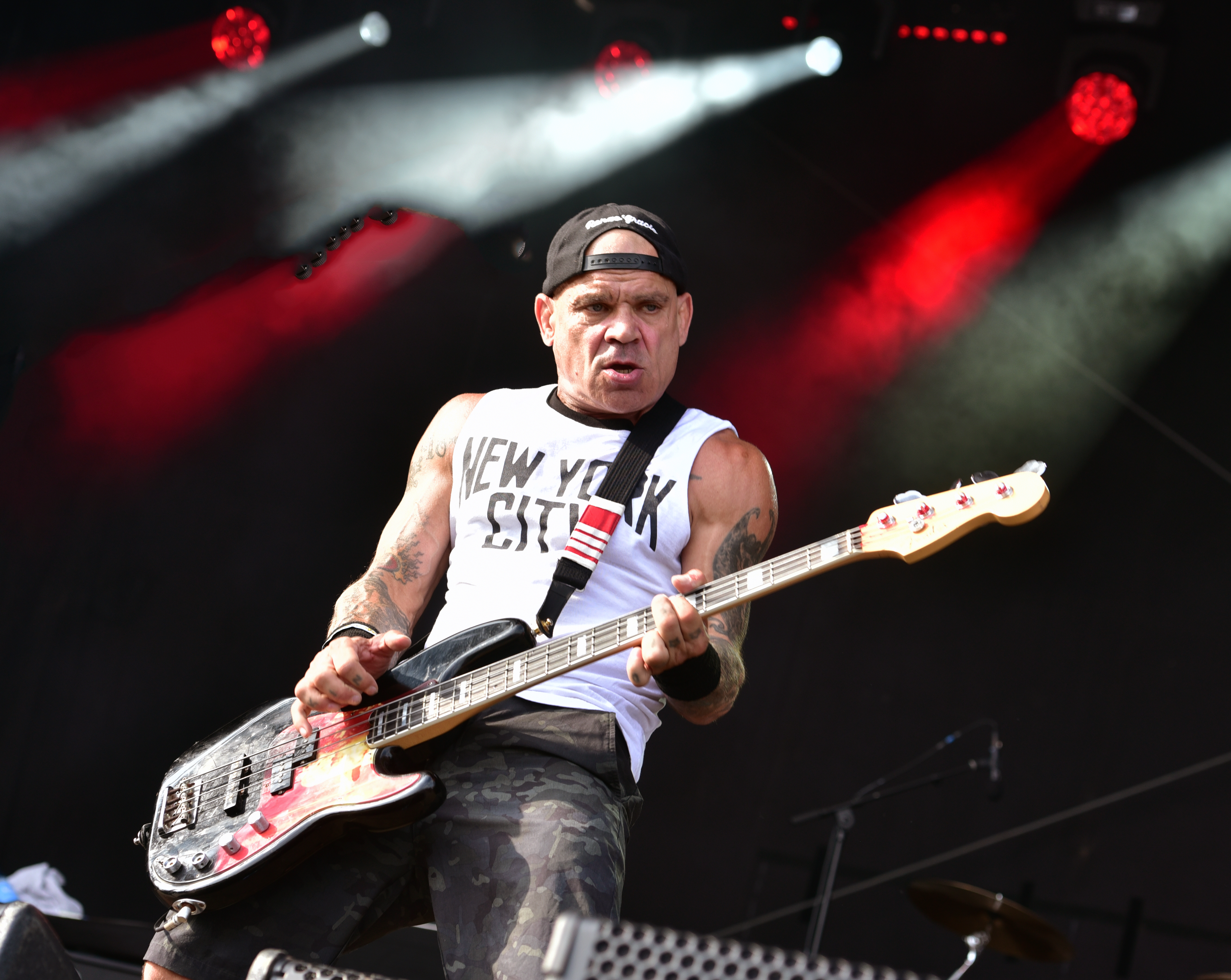
Flanagan performing at Reload Festival 2024

In 2012, Flanagan began writing songs for a solo project he stated "I started tracking all the songs myself. Originally, I tracked them all on acoustic guitar, then I put drums on some of them." However after some legal trouble and other personal problems it delayed the project. Nearly four years later he completed the album with producer Pete Thompson and the album titled Cro-Mags was released in early 2016 to positive reception.

On May 19, 2018, Flanagan's band was one of four classic punk/hardcore acts to play the Prudential Center in Newark, New Jersey, along with Murphy's Law, Suicidal Tendencies, and the Misfits. Flanagan also released two recordings: The Dr. Know EP, proceeds of which benefit the titular Bad Brains member, who has medical expenses; and, released on July 6, 2018, The Original Cro-Mags Demos, 1982/83, which documents Flanagan's work writing the songs, playing all instruments and singing early versions of the songs that are blueprint for the Cro-Mags sound.

== Artistry ==
Flanagan cited Darryl Jenifer, Geezer Butler, and Lemmy as his biggest bass influences. He also stated that Cronos of Venom, Jaco Pastorius (Flanagan owns one of his basses), and Stanley Clarke inspired him, trying to "bring all that stuff together" in his own music, mixed with hardcore's intensity.

When asked about his lyrical themes Flanagan stated:

My lyrics are the things that I feel and the things that I am going through. And the people that connect to that are usually going through the same thing. I just want to people to know that there was nothing about me that was fake. My legacy will always be that I was real. I’ve always been honest with my music and how I deal with people. I hope people learn something from my struggles and my experiences. I was as real as a mother fucker can be.

== Other ventures ==
Outside of music Flanagan has also made a number of acting appearances. His acting debut in the 1990 film Blue Steel where he played a punk background character. He played Irish Rouge in the 2003 Kamal Ahmed film God Has a Rap Sheet. In 2025 Flanagan made his feature film debut, playing Irish gangster McManus in the Tom Phillips film Between Wars.

Flanagan's autobiography, Hard-Core: Life of My Own, published by Feral House in 2016, contains an introduction by Steven Blush. Once published, the book spent over six months as the No. 1 seller in martial arts biographies on Amazon.

In 2024, Flanagan was the subject of a documentary called Harley Flanagan: Wired for Chaos. The documentary follows his life story from his entry into music at a young age all the way to present day.

In December 2024, Flanagan partnered with the hot sauce company Don Wapo to release his own signature hot sauce called Age of Hot Sauce.

== Personal life ==
Flanagan is the father of two sons and is married to Laura Lee Flanagan, who is an attorney and serves as Flanagan's business manager and also works as general counsel and CCO to investment advisory firms.

Flanagan exercises regularly and has been a vegetarian since 1982. He has credited the vegetarian lifestyle for keeping him in shape while he was addicted to drugs stating:

I was strung out on heroin for a while, I was a speed freak, I did crystal meth like it was going out of style, I smoked a lot of PCP, I used to eat acid like M&Ms. I'd say the worst drug experience is the depression and the cycle that you can't get out of. I'm really lucky that I did all that madness and I'm still in good shape. I think it was because I was a vegetarian! Even when I was chowing down on speed I'd still make sure I drank my wheatgrass juice.

In 2018 Flanagan underwent major back surgery due to a severe spinal cord injury several compressed discs and bone spurs that had built up major calcification.

=== Brazilian Jiu-jitsu ===
Flanagan is a second degree black-belt in Brazilian jiu-jitsu. He first got interested in training after renting UFC 1 & 2 on VHS. After this he began to actively look through black belt magazine’s for trainers in the New York area, eventually signing up for a class under Renzo Gracie. Flanagan would then continue to train under Gracie and the two would become good friends, with Flanagan eventually working as a professor for Renzo Gracie's Academy in New York City. His students included the daughter of Anthony Bourdain, who coincidentally attended NYC Stimulators concerts in the early 1980s, and was a fan of the then preteen drummer. Flanagan competed in tournaments from 1997 to 2012 and fought multiple unscationed MMA fights before it was legalized in New York.

=== Legal matters ===
On July 6, 2012, Flanagan was arrested for allegedly stabbing two current members of Cro-Mags, and biting one of them, backstage at the Webster Hall in New York City. Allegedly, Flanagan had been attacked in the dressing room. Flanagan was stabbed in the leg. He stated he drew the knife to defend himself and that the wound to his leg required 30 stitches. Charges were dropped in December 2012, due to a lack of cooperating witnesses. Flanagan was later sued in a civil action over the incident, but this suit was also dropped.

In 2018, Flanagan filed a lawsuit in federal court charging former band members John McGowan and Maxwell Jayson with trademark infringement. Flanagan won the lawsuit in April 2019, giving ownership and exclusive rights to the Cro-Mags band name. In April 2019 Flanagan announced a settlement where he would own exclusive use of the name "Cro-Mags"; simultaneously, Joseph announced his recognition of the settlement, and that he and his band would instead perform as Cro-Mags "JM", beginning in August 2019. Joseph's license to perform as Cro-Mags "JM" was revoked in September 2022 after a court decided that Joseph had violated the agreement when he instead began using the name Cro-Mags JAM which was outside of the terms of the settlement.

== Discography ==
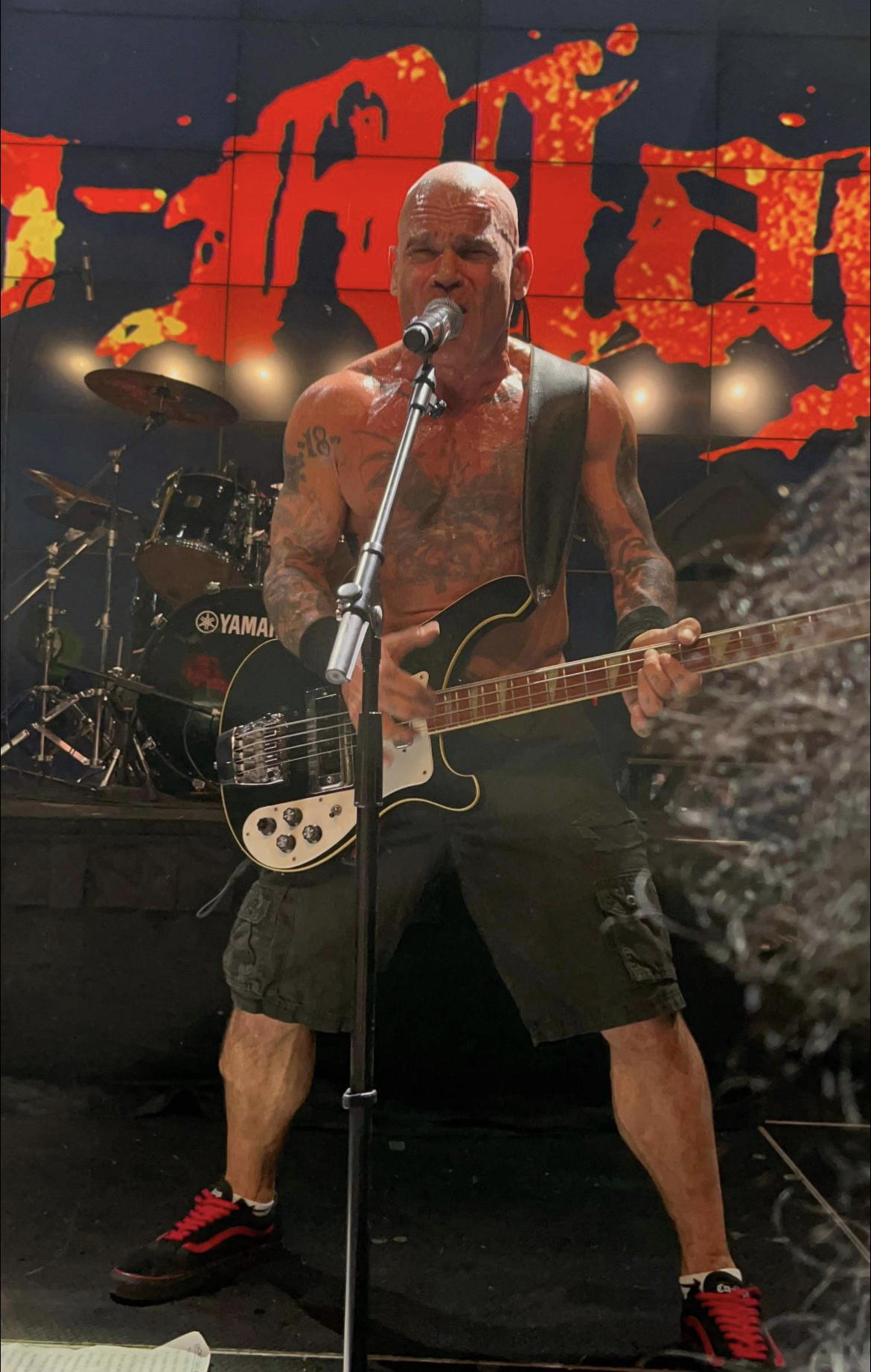
Flanagan performing in 2022

=== with the Stimulators ===
- Loud, Fast Rules!/Run Run Run (studio single, 1980)
- Loud, Fast Rules! (live concert recording, 1982)
- New York Thrash (various artists compilation, 1982)

=== with Cro-Mags ===
- The Age of Quarrel (1986)
- Best Wishes (1989)
- Alpha Omega (1992)
- Near Death Experience (1993)
- Revenge (2000)
- In the Beginning (2020)

=== with White Devil ===
- Reincarnation (1995)

=== with Harley's War ===
- Cro-Mag (2003)
- Hardcore All-Stars (2009)
- 2012 (2012)

=== Harley Flanagan solo work ===
- Cro-Mags (2016)
- Hard Core Dr. Know EP (2018)
- Cro Mags Demos (2018; recorded 1982–1983)
