= Best Wishes (Cro-Mags album) =

Studio album by Cro-Mags
- Released: April 26, 1989
- Recorded: 1988–1989
- Studios: Normandy Sound, Warren, Rhode Island
- Genres: Crossover thrash; thrash metal
- Length: 33:09
- Labels: Profile Records; Another Planet (1994 reissue)
- Producer: Chris Williamson

Cro-Mags chronology
The Age of Quarrel (1986)	Best Wishes (1989)	Alpha Omega (1992)

Best Wishes is the second album by the New York hardcore band Cro-Mags. It was released on April 26, 1989 via Profile Records and was subsequently re-released via Another Planet – along with the band's debut album, The Age of Quarrel, on the same disc.

The album's cover reflected the band's interest in the Hare Krishna religion which started with previous singer John Joseph and then carried on through Harley Flanagan who also became a devotee. Their next album, Alpha Omega, saw Joseph's return to the Cro-Mags fold, and an even further gravitation towards a metal sound.

== Overview ==
After the short, sharp bursts of song encountered on their previous album, 1986's The Age of Quarrel, this album saw a complete change of style as Cro-Mags entered the crossover thrash and thrash metal arena, complete with guitar solos. The songs also became longer – averaging around four minutes, whereas over half of Quarrel's songs came in under the two-minute mark. There were two line-up changes from the previous album – most notably, John Joseph's departure paved the way for Harley Flanagan to take up both bass and vocal duties. According to guitarist Parris Mayhew:

″The songs that made it infinitely apparent John couldn't do it were 'The Only One', and 'Death Camps' (all lyrics Harley wrote) you could hear and see that John was holding back vocally, struggling with melody and rhythm, mumbling quietly into the microphone instead of singing, while we blasted out these new songs. He was making excuses that our massive PA system wasn't loud enough to hear him when it was just that he was hiding, stalling and making excuses for his inability to find a melody...John was simply a bully and a jerk and his problematic uncooperative pose was getting old. I told him 'the band is moving on without you.' It was that simple.″

Flanagan's was a very different vocal style and it further juxtaposed the band's image from straightout hardcore punk to a more metal sound. Guitarist Parris Mayhew noted that following the release of The Age of Quarrel the bands metal fans began to outnumber their hardcore fans. He stated "the truth is we like heavy music, always had and we were developing an almost athletic musical performance. Best Wishes just became more athletic, musical and of course we were able to play more complicated and grooving music when we got a much better drummer, Pete Hines."

From April 14 to June 24, 1989, the Cro-Mags embarked on the "Down But Not Out tour" alongside Destruction in support of the album.

== Recording ==
The band recorded the album at Normandy Sound in Warren, Rhode Island the group were well rehearsed and finished recording the tracks in a couple of days. During the process drummer Pete Hines left due to being scared of a supposed local ghost in the area. Guitarist Doug Holland was suffering from a heroin addiction and was on methadone however the rest of the band still wanted him to record on the album. Parris Mayhew noted "his solos of course were excellent, his partial participation was all excellent but he just wasn't up to the task of meticulously learning and performing more of these complicated songs." This led to Mayhew playing Hollands parts of 4 of the 8 songs.

A majority of the material was written by both Mayhew and Harley Flanagan. While writing Flanagan told Mayhew that he wanted to "generic them to death" with some of the riffs.

== Release and reception ==
Professional ratings
Review scores
Source	Rating
AllMusic	4/5 stars

In an AllMusic review, Alex Henderson said:

"What would Lemmy Kilmister and Motörhead have sounded like if they'd been influenced by the Hare Krishna sect and the beliefs of Hinduism? They might have sounded like New York's unorthodox thrash metal/punk outfit the Cro-Mags, whose Best Wishes rocks ferociously while expressing a very Hindu viewpoint. The CD's cover contains some distinctly Indian art, and songs like 'Age of Quarrel,' 'Crush the Demoniac,' and 'Days of Confusion' were clearly inspired by the Bhagavad-Gita and other Hindu scriptures. The New Yorkers may see the violent, chaotic world around them as a living hell, but their overall message is one of hope and optimism. The Cro-Mags do see better days ahead—even if one has to go through various reincarnations in order to find them. Of course, a headbanger doesn't have to embrace Hinduism in order to appreciate Best Wishes—whatever one's spiritual beliefs, this is a band that rocks without hesitation."

Writing for The Pensive Quill, Christopher Owens summed the record up as "...a perfect example of crossover done correctly. It's heavy enough to appeal to the hi-tops brigade, but still retains the aggression and intensity of hardcore."

In 2018, Kerrang! ranked the album at number 36 on its 2019 list of the "50 Best Albums of 1989". The publication added "Those expecting traditional NYHC might be disappointed by Best Wishes' moaned vocals and icy riffs, but fans of latter-day thrash and hardcore's weirder edges are definitely in luck. Tracks like Days Of Confusion and Down But Not Out still provide plenty of heavy chugs, and there's a Misfits-on-speed sort of quality to Harley Flanagan's vocals thereon. Maybe not the most classic hardcore album, but one that provides powerful insight into the band's development."

== Track listing ==
No.	Title	Music	Length
1.	"Death Camps"	Flanagan, Holland, Hines	5:22
2.	"Days of Confusion"	Flanagan	2:19
3.	"The Only One"	Flanagan, Mayhew	4:55
4.	"Down but Not Out"	Flanagan, Mayhew	3:59
5.	"Crush the Demoniac"	Flanagan, Holland, Mayhew	3:56
6.	"Fugitive"	Flanagan, Holland, Mayhew	4:40
7.	"Then and Now"	Flanagan, Hines	3:12
8.	"Age of Quarrel"	Flanagan	4:45
Total length:			33:09

== Personnel ==
Cro-Mags

- Harley Flanagan – bass, vocals
- Doug Holland – lead guitar
- Parris Mitchell Mayhew – rhythm guitar
- Pete Hines – drums

Production

- Recorded in 1988–1989 at Normandy Sound, Warren, Rhode Island
- Produced by Chris Williamson
- Engineered by Tom Soares
- Assistant engineered by Jamie Locke
- Mixed by Chris Williamson and Tom Soares
- Further assistance by Robert Windsor
- Original cover illustration by The Bhaktivedanta Book Trust

Additional production

- Reissue remastered by Alan Douches at West Westside Music
