= Parris Mayhew =

American rock musician (born 1964)

Parris Mitchell Mayhew
- Born: September 28, 1964 (age 62); New York City, U.S.
- Genres: Hardcore punk, punk rock
- Occupations: Musician, songwriter, director, camera operator
- Instruments: Guitar, bass
- Years active: 1979–present
- Website: www.aggros.nyc

Parris Mitchell Mayhew (born 1964), formerly known as Kevin Mayhew, is an American musician, songwriter, director and camera operator. He is best known as a founding member of the New York Hardcore band Cro-Mags, in which he played guitar. He has also played in a number of other bands, including White Devil, and currently plays in Aggros.

Mayhew has directed several music videos and now works as a motion picture and television camera operator.

== Biography ==
Mayhew was born and raised in New York City. His father Aubrey Mayhew worked in the music industry and sparked Parris' interest to music in the 1970s. Mayhew cited Jimmy Page, Steve Howe, Alex Lifeson and Joe Perry as his early music influences when he learned to play guitar. Mayhew graduated from the High School of Art and Design and from The School of Visual Arts, New York City in 1989 with a bachelor's degree in Fine Arts Film.

He now lives with his wife Barblin Mayhew in Brooklyn, New York City.

== Career ==
=== Music ===
Mayhew got a drum set and a guitar when he was 13 years old, however he did not take a liking to either instrument and later switched to bass when his was 14. He never took any lessons or took part in any cover bands instead he started his own original band called Reported Missing with some of his friends in high school. The band broke up due to Mayhew wanting to play heavier while the rest of the band wanted to play music similar to Rush. At the age of 15, he joined New York City horror-punk band the MAD as a bass player for a few weeks.

Soon after the break up of Reported Missing Mayhew became a founding member, songwriter and guitarist of Cro-Mags, where he created music and played from 1983-1990 helping write both The Age of Quarrel and Best Wishes, which are both viewed as influential albums in the hardcore genre. He returned to the band for a reunion from 1996-2001 releasing one more album Revenge.

In 1994, he and Cro-Mags bandmate Harley Flanagan founded White Devil. The group released one album in 1995. However they disbanded shortly after with Mayhew being frustrated with Flanagan putting the Cro-Mags logo on all the bands promotional material and flyers, as Mayhew wanted to separate himself from the Cro-Mags at that point.

He played in other music bands including Sămsära and Psychic Orgy. In 2020, Mayhew founded Aggros, a new instrumental hardcore/metal band based in NYC. The band's first single "Chaos Magic" was released without label via Mayhew's YouTube channel in October 2020. He stated that band originally began as him writing a screenplay about a band called the Aggros and the music video was to establish the look of the show. In 2023, Mayhew recruited other members to the group to release their debut album Rise of the Aggros.

Mayhew also produced Merauder's first album Master Killer in 1995.

=== Directing and cinematography ===
While making music in Cro-Mags, Parris began directing music videos, first for Cro-Mags and then for other bands, including Biohazard ("Shades of Gray", "Punishment", "Tales From The Hard Side", "After Forever"), Onyx ("Slam"), Run DMC ("Ooh Whatcha Gonna Do?"), Type O Negative ("Black No. 1"), Public Enemy, Sepultura, King's X ("Dogman"), Insane Clown Posse ("Chickin Huntin"), Nuclear Assault ("Trail Of Tears"), Anthrax ("Belly Of The Beast", Live Noize and the documentary Attack Of The Killer B's), Flotsam and Jetsam, Gang Green, among dozens others.

From 2003, Mayhew worked as a camera operator in many projects for the International Cinematographers Guild (also known as Local 600). He is a member of the Society of Camera Operators and co-founder of Wildfire NYC, where he also works as director and cameraman.

== Gear and influences ==
During his early years with the Cro-Mags Mayhew used a 1981 BC Rich Bich. His amps consisted of JCM 800s 100 watt heads, with 2 straight Marshall cabinets. He used a BOSS Heavy Metal Pedal and on Best Wishes and on Revenge he used a Ibanez TS10 Tube Screamer. His gear now consists of three electric guitars, two acoustics a 1958 Martin D28 and a 1974 Martin D28 along with a 1980 Fender P bass which he uses to record on Aggros. He also uses a G & L Rampage, a Marshall JCM 2000 and JCM800.

In an interview with Guitar World he credited both Rush and Motörhead as the two biggest influences of his song writing.

== Selected discography ==
=== Cro-Mags ===
- Age of Quarrel (1986)
- Best Wishes (1989)
- Revenge (2000)

=== White Devil ===
- Reincarnation (1995)

=== Aggros ===
- Chaos Magic (2020)
- Rise of the Aggros (2023)

== Dispute over Cro-Mags domain name ==
Cro-Mags domain name ownership was a matter of dispute when Savoia NYC, an entity related to Harley Flanagan, filed the complaint with the World Intellectual Property Organization (WIPO). As Domain Name Wire states: " Mayhew was co-owner of an entity with Flanagan that held a trademark for Cro-Mags when he registered the domain name in 1999." However WIPO rejected granting the domain name to Flanagan, citing abuse of policy. As a result, Mayhew remained the owner of the original Cro-Mags domain.
