= Cro-Mags =

American hardcore punk band

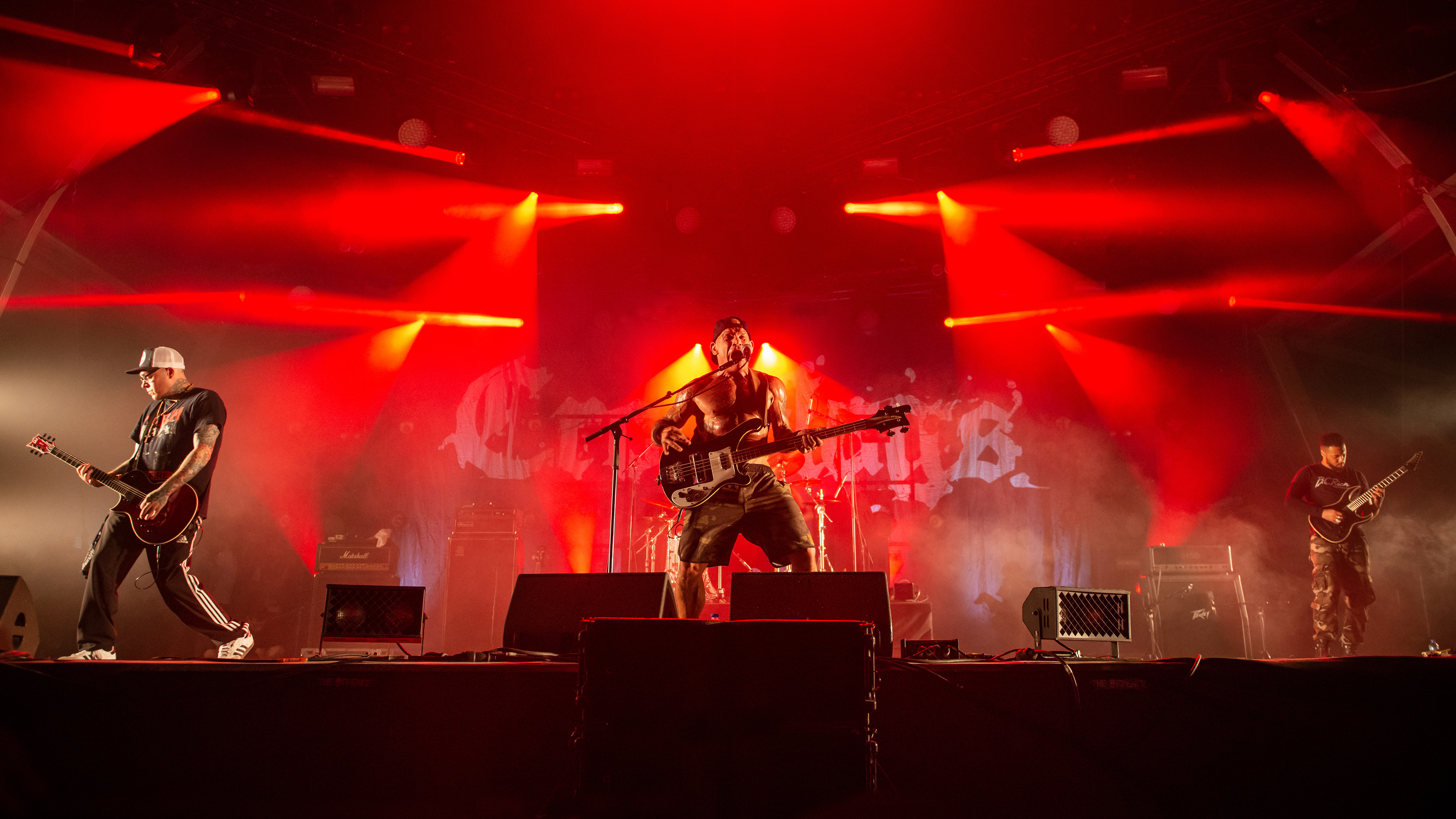
- Cro-Mags in 2022

Background information
- Also known as: Mode of Ignorance; Disco Smoothy (Note: Flanagan states in a 2018 interview with Blabbermouth.net that the name was Disco Smoothy, however John Joseph states in his 2007 autobiography that the name was the Disco Smoothies.)
- Origin: New York City, U.S.
- Genres: Hardcore punk; crossover thrash
- Works: Discography
- Years active: 1981 (Note: Flanagan states in a 2018 interview with Blabbermouth.net that the band was formed in 1980, however John Joseph states in his 2007 autobiography that the band was formed in 1981.)–2002; 2008–present
- Labels: Victory; Arising Empire; Century Media; Mightier Than Sword; BlkIIBlk
- Members: Harley Flanagan; Dom DiBenedetto; Pete Hines; Dave Sharpe
- Past members: Parris Mayhew; Dave Hahn; Dave Stein; John Joseph; John Berry; Mackie Jayson; Todd Youth; Roger Miret; Robb "Nunzio" Ortiz; Jim "HN's" Rice; Doug Holland; A.J. Novello; Johnny Waste; Craig Setari; Eric Casanova; Chris Lawrence; Gabby Abularach; Joe Affe; Dave di Censo; Rob Buckley; Garry Sullivan; Hector Guzman; Rocky George
- Website: realcromags.com

The Cro-Mags are an American hardcore punk band from New York City. They have released six studio albums. They were among the first bands to fuse hardcore punk with thrash metal. They were also a prototypical band for Krishnacore, a sub-sect of hardcore bands that adopt Krishna consciousness.

Harley Flanagan, who co-founded the Cro-Mags, reached a settlement in April 2019 with former singer John Joseph and former drummer Mackie Jayson. Under the terms of the agreement, Flanagan retained exclusive rights to the Cro-Mags name, while Joseph and Jayson would continue performing under the name Cro-Mags"JM". Despite not being a constant member of the band, having left and rejoined on a few occasions, Flanagan is the only musician from The Age of Quarrel lineup to appear on every Cro-Mags album.

== History ==
=== Early years (1980–1985) ===
How the Cro-Mags were formed is disputed by the band's founding members. In Tony Rettman's 2014 book NYHC: New York Hardcore 1980–1990, guitarist Parris Mayhew states that the band formed after he had put up a number of posters around New York in search of band members, to which Flanagan responded. In the same book, other people involved in the New York hardcore scene suggest that the band formed under the name Mode of Ignorance, with an original lineup consisting of Dave Hahn on drums, Mayhew and Dave Stein on guitar, John Joseph on lead vocals and Flanagan on bass. During its early existence, the band went through frequent lineup changes. Mayhew explains that this was because "Harley would see some kid with a shaved head and think 'This kid is hard... let's bring him into the band.' Then I would end up tolerating some horrible, talentless person for however long it took Harley to realise that the guy had no talent". Joseph left the band soon after to live in Puerto Rico and then Hawaii, and was replaced by Eric Casanova. One Cro-Mags lineup from this time consisted of Flanagan on drums, Mayhew on guitar, Todd Youth on bass and Casanova on vocals. By the time the band played their first live performance, Youth had been replaced by Roger Miret. Soon after, Casanova was kicked out of the band due to the birth of his son interfering with scheduling. By this time, Joseph had returned to New York and rejoined as the band's vocalist. Youth briefly rejoined the band after Miret's departure, at the same time Robb "Nunzio" Ortiz joined as an additional guitarist. A few months later, the band changed their name to the Cro-Mags.

However, Flanagan claims in his 2016 autobiography Hard-Core: Life of My Own that he and Mayhew met in 1980 after being introduced by Paul Dordal, and they began writing music together soon after and formed the band with vocalist Eric Casanova, who had only performed with the band twice. Following this, they would go on hiatus as Flanagan went to California then Canada, during which time he wrote and recorded demos for the songs "Everybody's Gonna Die", "Don't Tread On Me", "By Myself" and "Do Unto Others". After returning to New York in 1983, he regrouped the band and he, Mayhew and Casanova began writing again, using his demo tracks as a basis.

In 2018, Flanagan claimed that he formed the Cro-Mags in 1980 with guitarist Dave Stein, drummer Dave Hahn and vocalist John Berry and that the band's first performance was at the Peppermint Lounge opening for the Stimulators the same year. He thought the band was not ready to debut using their real name, so instead performed as Disco Smoothy. After this performance, the group disbanded and in 1982–1983, Flanagan recorded four tracks in Songshop Studios in New York City with Denise Mercedes of the Stimulators, the tracks set to be released by Rat Cage Records but issues regarding management prevented the project to come to fruition. He then recruited Eric Casanova on vocals, before meeting Parris Mayhew in 1983, who then joined as guitarist, along with drummer Mackie Jayson. This final story by Flanagan is mainly supported by John Joseph in his 2007 autobiography The Evolution of a Cro-Magnon, but Joseph states the band formed in 1981 and that he was the band's vocalist prior to Berry, but left prior to the Peppermint Lounge performance because he thought the name they were performing under was not serious enough.

During the summer and fall of 1984, the band began playing multiple shows in New York, opening for bands such as Warzone, Murphy’s Law and The Young & The Useless. In 1985, they continued playing shows in New York mainly at CBGB’s, however they would also make their first international appearances playing multiple shows in Montreal, Canada.

=== Rising popularity, lineup changes and breakup (1986–2002) ===
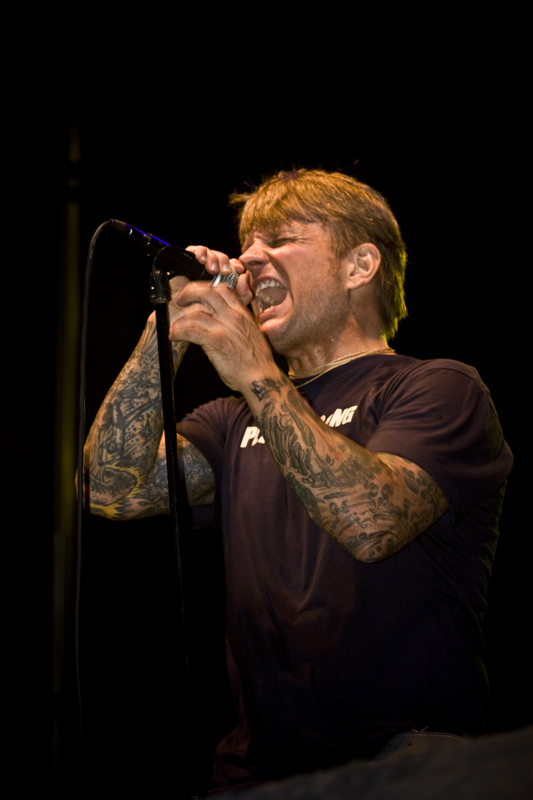
Former vocalist John Joseph in 2010

In the summer of 1986, the Cro-Mags supported GBH on their US tour. Later that year the bands debut album The Age of Quarrel was released in 1986, which was mostly written by Parris Mayhew and Flanagan, some songs being based on a four track demo that Flanagan had recorded solo in 1982 while on the West Coast. Following the albums release Cro-Mags served as main support for Motörhead on the US leg of their Orgasmatron Tour. For the first half of 1987 the band toured the US, during the end of the year the band toured Europe it was during this tour that Joseph parted ways with the band again, leaving Flanagan to become the bands lead singer.

From April 14 to June 24, 1989, the Cro-Mags embarked on the "Down But Not Out tour" alongside Destruction. While on tour the groups on the second album, Best Wishes was released, which had a more heavy metal-influenced sound. In the summer of 1990, the Cro-Mags held a US tour with bands such as Wargasm and Temporary Insanity serving as support. The following summer saw the Cro-Mags hold an extensive European tour in celebration of the bands 10th anniversary.

The bands next album, Alpha Omega was released in 1992, and saw the return of Joseph singing along with Flanagan. According to co-founder Parris Mayhew, he wrote most of the album with guitarist Rob Buckley. However, neither Mayhew or Buckley played on the actual recording, and the writing has been disputed by Flanagan and others. The Alpha Omega US tour then took place in the November and December of that year. The Cro-Mags disbanded but later recorded the album with the return of Doug Holland and a new rhythm guitarist, Gabby Abularach.

Their third album, Near Death Experience was released in 1993, the band then toured Europe in support of the album with Only Living Witness and Upset Noise. In 1994, the live album Hard Times in an Age of Quarrel was released via Century Media, they spent most of the year touring the US. Soon the group disbanded for several years. They began touring again in the late 1990s with Flanagan on vocals and bass and Mayhew returning to the fold. Eventually, the band released Revenge in 2000. For many fans, this album signified a return to the Cro-Mags' early hardcore roots. Many songs were comparable to those on The Age of Quarrel, although some featured a more melodic/punk rock style. The release of Revenge and its subsequent tour resulted in yet another break up, which caused lasting resentment between Mayhew and Flanagan. In 2001 Flanagan asked Joseph to join him once again, but the short-lived reunion ended in 2002.

=== Reunion and legal battle over name ownership (2008–2019) ===
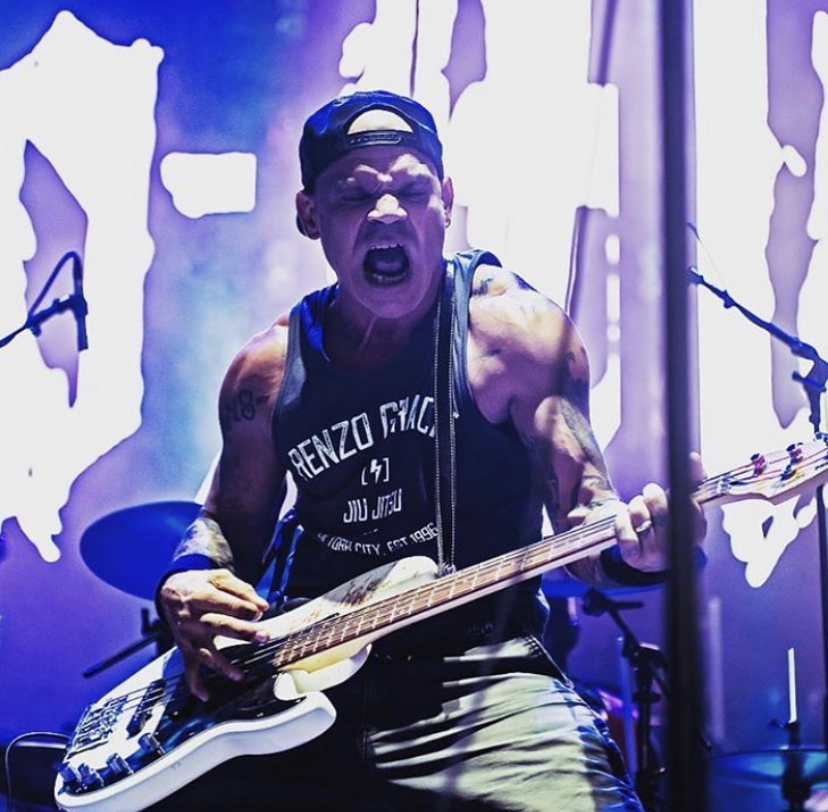
Harley Flanagan performing in 2019

In 2008, John Joseph and Jayson began playing shows under the Cro-Mags name with other established hardcore musicians such as Craig Setari from Sick of It All on bass and A.J. Novello from Leeway on guitar. In an October 2010 interview, Joseph revealed that they were planning to release a new album in 2011. This album never happened, as Joseph did not have the legal right to release music using the trademarked name Cro-Mags.

During the 2010s Cro-Mags continued to tour the US and North America multiple times with acts such as Hatebreed, Eyehategod along with making multiple festivals appearances.

On July 6, 2012, Flanagan was arrested for allegedly stabbing two current members of Cro-Mags, and biting one of them, backstage at the Webster Hall in New York City. Allegedly, Flanagan had been attacked in the dressing room. Flanagan was stabbed in the leg. He stated he drew the knife to defend himself and that the wound to his leg required 30 stitches. Charges were dropped in December 2012, due to a lack of cooperating witnesses. Flanagan was later sued in a civil action over the incident, but this suit was also dropped.

In 2018, Flanagan filed a federal trademark infringement suit against John Joseph and Mackie Jayson in the Southern District of New York. In April 2019, Flanagan announced a settlement wherein he would own exclusive rights to the name Cro-Mags; simultaneously, Joseph announced his recognition of the settlement, and that he and his band would perform as the Cro-Mags JM, having been granted a limited license to use the name in this manner, beginning in August 2019. Joesph's version of the Cro-Mags then toured with Killswitch Engage during the summer of that year. Infringement by Joseph in 2022 resulted in a permanent injunction granted by the Federal District Court of the Southern District of New York. The rights to the Cro-Mags name now belong exclusively to Flanagan.

=== Current version of the Cro-Mags (2019–present) ===
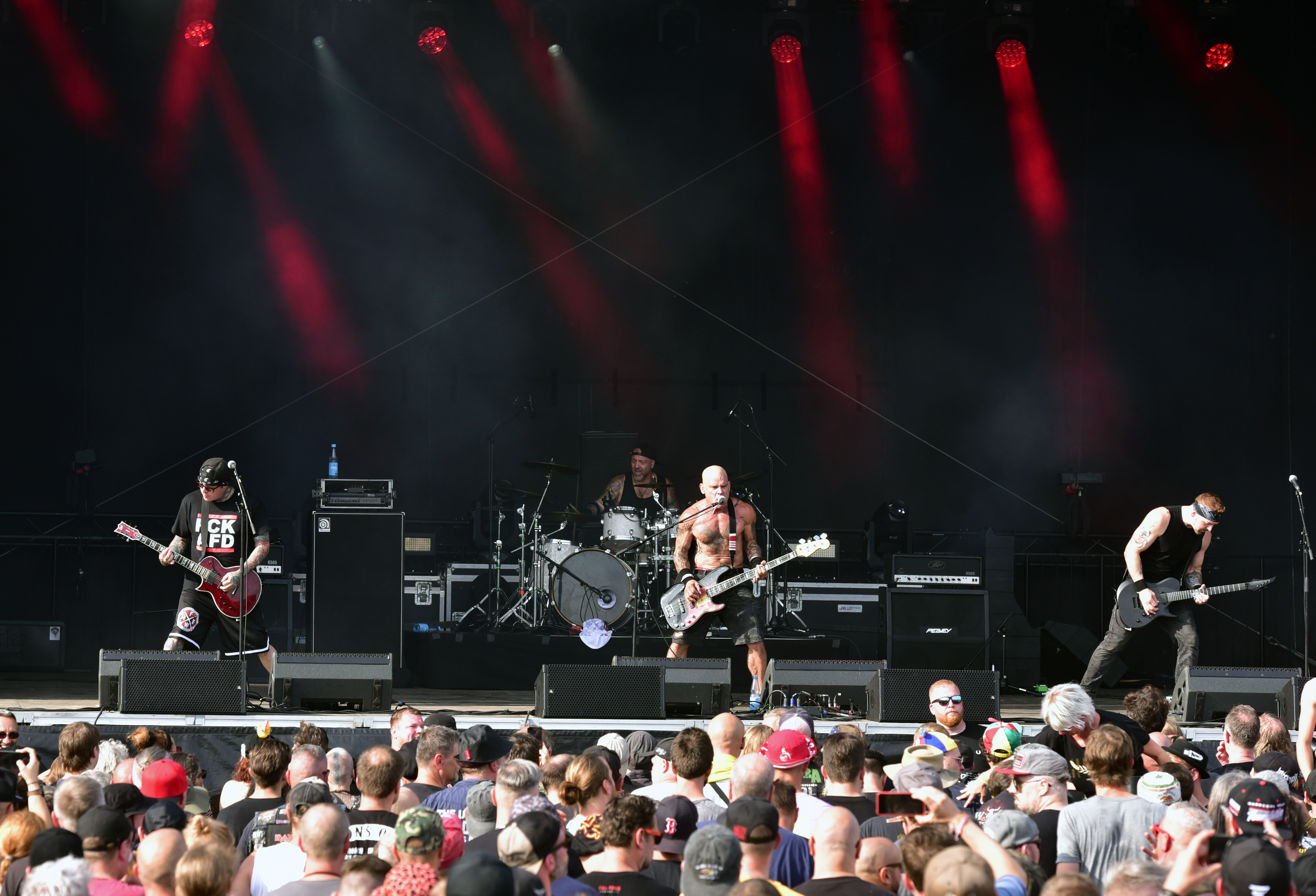
Cro-Mags at Reload Festival 2024

On June 28, 2019, the Cro-Mags released their first new music in nineteen years, before a five-show string of performances opening for the Misfits, sharing three new songs "Don't Give In", "Drag You Under", and "No One's Victim", and toured in North America and Europe. The line-up consisted of Flanagan on bass and vocals, Abulurach on guitar, Rocky George on lead guitar and long time drummer Garry "G-Man" Sullivan on drums.

At the end of 2019, they released "From the Grave" featuring former Motörhead guitarist Phil Campbell on lead and slide guitar. A three-song 7-inch EP of the same name was released on December 6, 2019, in various colors and have the tracks "PTSD" and "Between Wars" included. The band was set to perform with Body Count in New York City on March 15 at Webster Hall. The show was postponed due to the COVID-19 virus. The band decided to live stream a free performance from SIR studios, one of the first bands to do so during the pandemic. On March 31, 2020, the band offered a free download of the track, "The Final Test" and announced the June 19 release date of their first studio album in twenty years, In the Beginning.

In July 2022, Flanagan announced that the Cro-Mags were working on new material for their next album. In July 2023, the band embarked on a short tour playing their 1989 album Best Wishes in it entirety. In early 2024, Cro-Mags headlined a Southeastern tour with Snafu and Writhings. They then toured alongside Helmet in the spring and ended the year by touring with Terror.

In March 2025, the Cro-Mags supported Danzig on a West Coast tour. On September 10, 2025, Flanagan announced that drummer Pete Hines had rejoined the Cro-Mags, and in the same month, the band embarked on their first East Coast U.S. tour with him in more than 35 years. The band had also planned to release a new album in 2026. On January 14, 2026, the Cro-Mags announced that they had signed a deal with BlkIIBlk Records. In June of that year, the band released its first song in six years "Wired for Chaos", and announced that their new album will be released in 2027. Cro-Mags played a mini-East Coast tour alongside Suicidal Tendencies in the late summer of 2026.

On August 6, 2026, the band released a re-recorded version of "World Peace" from The Age of Quarrel: 40 Years of Quarrel, a complete re-recording of their 1986 album The Age of Quarrel, which was released on November 13.

== Musical style and legacy ==
The Cro-Mags are known for their ability to blend both hardcore and thrash metal influences. The band's debut album The Age of Quarrel had a traditional hardcore sound, whereas their next three albums Best Wishes, Alpha Omega and Near Death Experience touched more upon a metal-influenced sound. In an interview former Cro-Mags guitarist Parris Mayhew, he noted that following the release of The Age of Quarrel the band's metal fans began to outnumber their hardcore fans. Commenting on the sound change on Best Wishes, Mayhew stated: "The truth is we like heavy music, always had and we were developing an almost athletic musical performance. Best Wishes just became more athletic, musical and of course we were able to play more complicated and grooving music when we got a much better drummer, Pete Hines." While the band had kept their hardcore punk roots and metal influences intact, Alpha Omega and Near Death Experience saw the Cro-Mags evolve into a more progressive vein, combining elements of funk, jazz, groove metal, and rap metal.

Some of the band's influences include Motörhead, Bad Brains, Black Sabbath, Rush, Yes, Minor Threat, the Circle Jerks and Black Flag. In 2017, Flanagan stated he was also influenced by the unusual chord structure of jazz/fusion genres.

The Cro-Mags are viewed as a crucial band in the hardcore, crossover and thrash metal genres. Their debut The Age of Quarrel is often cited as a landmark in the hardcore genre, with AllMusic writing "It's practically impossible to understand or appreciate New York hardcore without first spending time listening to Age of Quarrel." Best Wishes also heavily impacted the crossover trash scene. The album was cited as a major influence by much of the 1990s New York hardcore scene, particularly Biohazard, Merauder and Candiria.

The Cro-Mags have been cited as an influence or inspiration to numerous bands such as Metallica, Green Day, Pantera, Sepultura, Sick of It All, Earth Crisis, Shadows Fall, Power Trip, Life of Agony, Bleeding Through, AFI, Killswitch Engage, Avenged Sevenfold, Hatebreed, Madball, Prong, Turnstile, and Crown of Thornz. Exclaim! wrote "the amount of bands that check Cro-Mags as an influence is mind-boggling." The band has also received praise from musicians such as Dave Grohl, Scott Ian, Lemmy, Rob Halford, Mike Patton and Dimebag Darrell. According to Mayhew, Layne Staley of Alice in Chains once told him that "In Seattle, [the] Cro-Mags [were] like our Led Zeppelin."

== Band members ==
Current

- Harley Flanagan – bass (1981–1982, 1984–1996, 1999–2003, 2019–present), vocals (1982, 1987–1991, 1999–2002, 2019–present), drums (1982–1984), guitars (1982)
- Pete Hines – drums (1986–1989, 2025–present)
- Dom DiBenedetto – rhythm guitar (2022–present)
- Dave Sharpe – lead guitar (2023–present)

Former

- Dave Hahn – drums (1981)
- Dave Stein – lead guitar (1981), died 2014
- John Joseph – vocals (1981, (Note: Joseph states in his 2007 autobiography that he was the band's founding vocalist in 1981 prior to John Berry. This is disputed by Flanagan, who claims Berry was the band's founding vocalist in 1980.) 1984–1987, 1991–1999, 2002–2003, 2008–2019)
- John Berry – vocals (1981 (Note: Flanagan states in a 2018 interview with Blabbermouth.net that Berry was the band's founding vocalist in 1980, however John Joseph states in his 2007 autobiography that Berry was the band's second vocalist in 1981. Berry being a part of the band was disputed by Parris Mayhew in NYHC: New York Hardcore 1980–1990.)), died 2016
- Parris Mayhew – rhythm guitar (1983 (Note: Flanagan states in his 2016 autobiography that Mayhew was a founding member of the band in 1980. However, he states in a 2018 interview with Blabbermouth.net that Mayhew did not join until 1983.)–1991, 1999–2001); lead guitar (1982–1984)
- Eric Casanova – vocals (1983 (Note: Flanagan states in his 2016 autobiography that Casanova joined 1980. However, he states in a 2018 interview with Blabbermouth.net that he joined in 1983.)–1984)
- Todd Youth – bass (1982–1983, 1984), died 2018
- Roger Miret – bass (1983–1984)
- Robb "Nunzio" Ortiz – lead guitar (1984)
- Mackie Jayson – drums (1983–1986, 1996–1999, 2008–2019)
- Doug Holland – lead guitar (1985–1989, 1991–1999, 2001); rhythm guitar (1995–1999, 2001)
- Dave di Censo – drums (1989–1995)
- Rob Buckley – lead guitar (1989–1991, 1993–1995, 2001); rhythm guitar (1993–1995, 2001)
- Gabby Abularach – rhythm guitar (1991–1995, 2019–2020)
- A.J. Novello – guitars (1993–1994, 2001–2002, 2008–2019)
- Rocky George – lead guitar (1999–2001, 2002–2003, 2019–2022); rhythm guitar (2002–2003)
- Craig Setari – bass (2008–2019)
- Joe Affe – rhythm guitar (2020–2022; touring 2019, 2025)
- Garry "G-Man" Sullivan – drums (1999–2001, 2002–2003, 2019–2023)
- Hector Guzman – lead guitar (2022–2023)
- Christian Lawrence – drums (2023–2025)

At various times during the 1990s and 2000s, Flanagan and Joseph simultaneously led separate versions of the Cro-Mags with completely different lineups. The groups billed themselves as Cro-Mag Jam, Street Justice, Age of Quarrel, FVK (Fearless Vampire Killers) or Cholo-Mags.

Timeline

== Discography ==
- The Age of Quarrel (1986)
- Best Wishes (1989)
- Alpha Omega (1992)
- Near Death Experience (1993)
- Revenge (2000)
- In the Beginning (2020)

== See also ==
- New York hardcore
