= Orgasmatron Tour =

1986–1987 concert tour by Motörhead

- Tour by Motörhead
- Poster with the UK tour dates
- Associated album: Orgasmatron
- Start date: 15 September 1986
- End date: 28 April 1987
- Legs: 5
- No. of shows: 96

Motörhead concert chronology
- 10th Anniversary Tour (1985); Orgasmatron Tour (1986–1987); Rock 'n' Roll Tour (1987–1989)

The Orgasmatron Tour was a concert tour by heavy metal band Motörhead in support of their album, Orgasmatron. It would be the final tour with Pete Gill, as he would be fired in 1987 and replaced with Phil "Philthy Animal" Taylor for the remainder of the tour.

== Overview ==
Originally the band was planning on having a life sized replica of the train from the cover of Orgasmatron, akin to the Bomber rig and the Iron Fist prop. In his biography White Line Fever, Lemmy described how it was supposed to work:

The drums went on the front of the train, and it came out on rails in the middle of the stage – basically Pete was riding out to the front on the train. But it never fucking worked. You couldn't get the rails on the stage properly and things like that.

During the band North American leg in 1986 Lemmy recalls it "not being our most stellar tour". Megadeth opened for a few dates but were dropped due to frustrations with their manager. During their show in Chalmette, Louisiana the band cut their set short due to the crowd continuously spitting on the band, which resulted in a riot. In 1987, Motörhead appeared in the Peter Richardson film Eat the Rich. As the band was about to film their cameo, however, drummer Pete Gill was fired and Phil "Philthy Animal" Taylor rejoined after having quit in 1984. Gill tried to downplay his firing saying in The Hard Report that his departure was "by mutual agreement. I left for business reasons, not musical or personal. There has been no great rift." Lemmy adds that he knew Taylor, who had been playing with Frankie Miller and ex-Thin Lizzy guitarist Brian "Robbo" Robertson, wanted to come back. Phil would go on to finish the last remaining dates of the tour.

== Personnel ==
- Lemmy Kilmister – bass guitar, vocals
- Phil "Wizzö" Campbell – guitar
- Michael "Würzel" Burston – guitar
- Pete Gill – drums (26 March 1986 – 10 February 1987)
- Phil "Philthy Animal" Taylor (5 March 1987 – 28 April 1987)

== Setlists ==
=== 1986 ===
1. "Iron Fist"
2. "Stay Clean"
3. "Nothing Up My Sleeve"
4. "Metropolis"
5. "Doctor Rock"
6. "Killed by Death"
7. "Ace of Spades"
8. "Steal Your Face"
9. ”Deaf Forever”
10. "Bite the Bullet"
11. "Built for Speed"
12. "No Class"
13. "Orgasmatron"
14. "Motorhead"

Encore:

15. "Bomber"
16. "Overkill"

=== 1987 ===
1. "Iron Fist"
2. "Stay Clean"
3. "Nothing Up My Sleeve"
4. "Metropolis"
5. "Doctor Rock"
6. "Deaf Forever”
7. "Ace of Spades"
8. "Steal Your Face"
9. "Ain't My Crime"
10. "Bite the Bullet"
11. "Built for Speed"
12. "No Class"
13. "Orgasmatron"
14. "Motorhead"

Encore:

15. "Killed by Death"
16. "Overkill"

== Tour dates ==
List of 1986 concerts
Date	City	Country	Venue	Support act(s)
15 September 1986	Birmingham	England	Birmingham Odeon	Zodiac Mindwarp and the Love Reaction
16 September 1986	Newcastle	England	Newcastle City Hall	Zodiac Mindwarp and the Love Reaction
17 September 1986	Edinburgh	Scotland	Edinburgh Playhouse	Zodiac Mindwarp and the Love Reaction
18 September 1986	Bradford	England	St George's Hall	Zodiac Mindwarp and the Love Reaction
20 September 1986	Manchester	England	Manchester Apollo	Zodiac Mindwarp and the Love Reaction
21 September 1986	Cardiff	Wales	St David's Hall	Zodiac Mindwarp and the Love Reaction
22 September 1986	London	England	Hammersmith Odeon	Zodiac Mindwarp and the Love Reaction
23 September 1986	Nottingham	England	Nottingham Royal Concert Hall	Zodiac Mindwarp and the Love Reaction
10 October 1986	Oakland	United States	Henry J. Kaiser Convention Center	Megadeth; Cro-Mags
12 October 1986	San Bernardino	United States	Orange Pavilion	Megadeth; Cro-Mags
14 October 1986	Portland	United States	Pine Street Theatre	Megadeth; Cro-Mags
15 October 1986	Seattle	United States	Paramount Theatre	Megadeth; Cro-Mags
17 October 1986	San Diego	United States	California Theatre	Cro-Mags; Raw Power; Dayglo Abortions
18 October 1986	Long Beach	United States	Fender's Ballroom	Cro-Mags; Raw Power; Dayglo Abortions
19 October 1986	Phoenix	United States	Pride Pavilion	Cro-Mags; Kaiser
22 October 1986	Austin	United States	—N/a	Cro-Mags
23 October 1986	Corpus Christi	United States	The Ritz Theatre	Cro-Mags; Omen
24 October 1986	San Antonio	United States	Sunken Gardens Amphitheater	Cro-Mags; Omen
25 October 1986	Dallas	United States	Longhorn Ballroom	Cro-Mags; Wendy O. Williams; Scratch Acid
26 October 1986	Houston	United States	Cardi's	Cro-Mags
27 October 1986	Chalmette	United States	St. Bernard Civic Auditorium	Agnostic Front; Cro-Mags
29 October 1986	Cincinnati	United States	Bogart's	Cro-Mags
30 October 1986	Detroit	United States	Harpos Concert Theatre	Cro-Mags
31 October 1986	Chicago	United States	Aragon Ballroom	Cro-Mags; T.T. Quick
1 November 1986	West Hartford	United States	Agora Ballroom	Cro-Mags
3 November 1986	Racine	United States	Memorial Hall	Cro-Mags; Screamer
4 November 1986	Aurora	United States	Malo's	Cro-Mags
5 November 1986	Cuyahoga Falls	United States	Agora	Cro-Mags
7 November 1986	Buffalo	United States	Buffalo State College	Cro-Mags; Wendy O. Williams
8 November 1986	Niagara Falls	Canada	Uncle Sam's	—N/a
9 November 1986	New York City	United States	The Ritz	Cro-Mags; Dark Angel
12 November 1986	Hamilton	Canada	—N/a	—N/a
13 November 1986	Gatineau	Canada	Chaudiere Ballroom	Shock
14 November 1986	Montreal	Canada	Le Paladium	Lizzy Borden; Deaf Dealer
15 November 1986	Toronto	Canada	The Concert Hall	Razor
16 November 1986	Cleveland	United States	Cleveland Agora	Cro-Mags
19 November 1986	Boston	United States	The Channel	Cro-Mags; Knightmare
20 November 1986	Baltimore	United States	Hammerjack's	—N/a
21 November 1986	New York City	United States	L'Amour	Lizzy Borden
22 November 1986	Bay Shore	United States	Sundance	Lizzy Borden
23 November 1986	Washington, D.C.	United States	Warner Theatre	Cro-Mags; Lizzy Borden
24 November 1986	Providence	United States	The Living Room	Lizzy Borden
1 December 1986	Hanover	West Germany	Rotation	Savatage
2 December 1986	Hamburg	West Germany	Große Freiheit 36	Savatage
3 December 1986	Essen	West Germany	Pink Palace	Savatage
4 December 1986	West Berlin	West Germany	Neues Schauspielhaus	Savatage
6 December 1986	Bremen	West Germany	ÖVB Arena	Savatage
7 December 1986	Ludwigshafen am Rhein	West Germany	Friedrich-Ebert-Halle	Savatage
8 December 1986	Ulm	West Germany	Donauhalle Ulm	Savatage
9 December 1986	Neunkirchen am Brand	West Germany	Hemmerleinhalle	Savatage
10 December 1986	Munich	West Germany	Alabamahalle	Savatage
11 December 1986	Offenbach	West Germany	Stadthalle Offenbach	Savatage
12 December 1986	Ludwigsburg	West Germany	Rockfabrik	Savatage

List of 1987 concerts
Date	City	Country	Venue	Support act(s)
10 February 1987	Paris	France	Maison de la Mutualité	—N/a
5 March 1987	Madrid	Spain	Pabellón de la Ciudad Deportiva del Real Madrid	—N/a
7 March 1987	San Sebastián	Spain	Polideportivo Anoeta	—N/a
9 March 1987	Toulouse	France	L'Apocalypse	—N/a
10 March 1987	Dijon	France	Le Forum	—N/a
11 March 1987	Reims	France	Théâtre	—N/a
12 March 1987	Nancy	France	Parc des Expositions	—N/a
13 March 1987	Geneva	Switzerland	Palladium	—N/a
14 March 1987	Zürich	Switzerland	Volkshaus	Onslaught
16 March 1987	Naples	Italy	Teatro Palapartenope	Onslaught
17 March 1987	Nancy	France	Parc des Expositions	—N/a
18 March 1987	Milian	Italy	Rolling Stone	Onslaught
19 March 1987	Gorizia	Italy	Palasport	Onslaught
21 March 1987	Dornbirn	Austria	Stadhalle	Onslaught
22 March 1987	Appenweier	West Germany	Schwarzwaldhalle	Onslaught
23 March 1987	Osnabrück	West Germany	Gartlage Hall	Onslaught; Zeltinger Band
25 March 1987	Poperinge	Belgium	Maeke Blyde	Onslaught
26 March 1987	's-Hertogenbosch	Netherlands	Brabanthallen	Onslaught
28 March 1987	Copenhagen	Denmark	Saga Cinema	Onslaught
29 March 1987	Oslo	Norway	Unknown venue	Onslaught
30 March 1987	Stockholm	Sweden	Fryshuset	Onslaught
31 March 1987	Lund	Sweden	Olympen	—N/a
4 April 1987	Old Forge	United States	Autograph's	Savage Grace; Malice
5 April 1987	Providence	United States	The Living Room	Savage Grace; Malice
7 April 1987	Rochester	United States	Penny Arcade	Savage Grace
8 April 1987	Boston	United States	The Channel	Savage Grace; Malice; Knightmare
9 April 1987	West Hartford	United States	Agora Ballroom	Savage Grace; Malice
10 April 1987	New York City	United States	L'Amour East	Savage Grace
11 April 1987	Commack	United States	L'Amour Far East	Savage Grace
12 April 1987	Philadelphia	United States	Trocadero Theatre	Savage Grace; Anvil Bitch; She-Male Experience
14 April 1987	Washington, D.C.	United States	The Bayou	Savage Grace
15 April 1987	Washington, D.C.	United States	The Bayou	Savage Grace
16 April 1987	Cleveland	United States	Shadow's Night Club	Savage Grace
17 April 1987	Detroit	United States	Harpos Concert Theatre	Savage Grace
18 April 1987	Milwaukee	United States	Eagles Ballroom	Savage Grace; Zoetrope
19 April 1987	Minneapolis	United States	First Avenue	Savage Grace
21 April 1987	Cincinnati	United States	Bogart's	Savage Grace
22 April 1987	Chicago	United States	The Vic Theatre	Savage Grace
24 April 1987	Los Angeles	United States	Hollywood Palladium	Savage Grace; Lizzy Borden
25 April 1987	Berkeley	United States	Pauley Ballroom	Savage Grace
26 April 1987	Los Angeles	United States	Reseda Country Club	Savage Grace
27 April 1987	San Francisco	United States	The I-Beam	Savage Grace
28 April 1987	Santa Clara	United States	One Step Beyond	Savage Grace
