= Master Killer (album) =

Studio album by Merauder
- Released: October 1995
- Studios: Normandy Sound, Warren, Rhode Island
- Genres: Metalcore; hardcore punk; groove metal
- Length: 34:29
- Label: Century Media
- Producer: Parris Mayhew

Professional ratings
Review scores
Source	Rating
AllMusic	4/5 stars
Chronicles of Chaos	3/10
Lollipop Magazine	positive
Powermetal	positive
Rock Hard	9/10
Visions	8/12

Master Killer is the debut studio album by American metalcore/hardcore band Merauder, released by Century Media in 1995.

Produced by Parris Mayhew, it moved over 30,000 units and was described by AllMusic as an "artistic and commercial success". They stated that "heaviness is at a premium on Master Killer. The guitars are loud and large, vocalist Jorge belts out his lines with a rare depth and conviction, and every participant contributes admirably, making this Century Media offering a truly impressive one."

== Track listing ==
Master Killer track listing
No.	Title	Length
1.	"Time Ends"	03:46
2.	"Life Is Pain"	03:21
3.	"Mirror Shows Black"	02:49
4.	"Master Killer"	03:23
5.	"Downfall of Christ"	03:16
6.	"Dead End Path"	03:13
7.	"Take by Force"	04:25
8.	"Fear of Sin"	03:05
9.	"Besiege the Masses"	03:37
10.	"Crossfire"	03:35
Total length:		34:29

== Personnel ==
Merauder

- Jorge Rosado – vocals
- Javier "Sob" Carpio – guitars
- Anthony Muccini – guitars
- Rick Lopez – bass
- Vinnie Vitale – drums

Guest/session

- Jay Sunkes – vocals (backing)
- Parris Mitchell Mayhew – vocals (backing)
- Bob Riley – vocals (additional)

Production

- Brian Buccelato – cover art
- Tom Soares – engineering, mixing
- Parris Mitchell Mayhew – producer
- Drew Stone – executive producer
