= John Joseph (singer) =

American musician

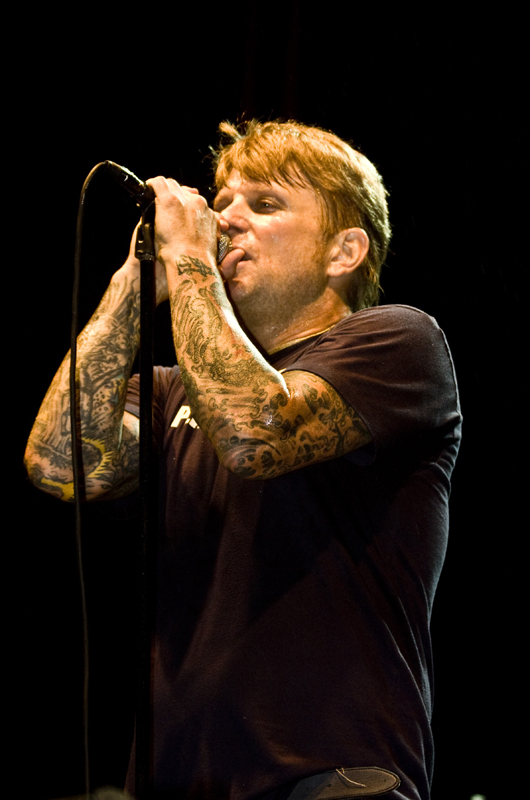
- McGowan with Cro-Mags in 2010

Background information
- Born: John Joseph McGowan; October 3, 1962 (age 63); New York, U.S.
- Genres: Hardcore punk, crossover thrash
- Occupations: Singer, author
- Formerly of: Cro-Mags

John Joseph McGowan (born October 3, 1962) is an American musician and author, most famous for his work as the lead singer of the hardcore band Cro-Mags. He is currently the vocalist of Bloodclot and was previously the vocalist of Both Worlds in the 1990s. He has been described by Blabbermouth.net as a "pioneer of the punk rock and New York hardcore genres."

== Early life ==
John Joseph McGowan was born on October 3, 1962. His father was a well known boxer who was very violent towards his mother. Joseph once stated "The last memory I have of him was that he broke down the door one night to my mom’s house and beat her all over the apartment, and she ended up in the hospital. Broke her jaw, everything. That’s when they took us away and put us in the orphanages, and then they put us in foster care." McGowan and his two brothers were separated in foster care. He spent 5-7 years in the foster care system where he was beaten and starved.

By the age of 14 McGowan ran away from the foster home and began living on the streets of New York City. He also took to drugs such as heroin and began doing petty crimes, eventually getting shot in Forest Park. After serving time for a drug conviction McGowan joined the U.S. Navy in 1980. He would graduate with honors and became a physical training petty officer. His service would only last a year as he went AWOL after a physical altercation.

== Career ==
=== Cro-Mags ===
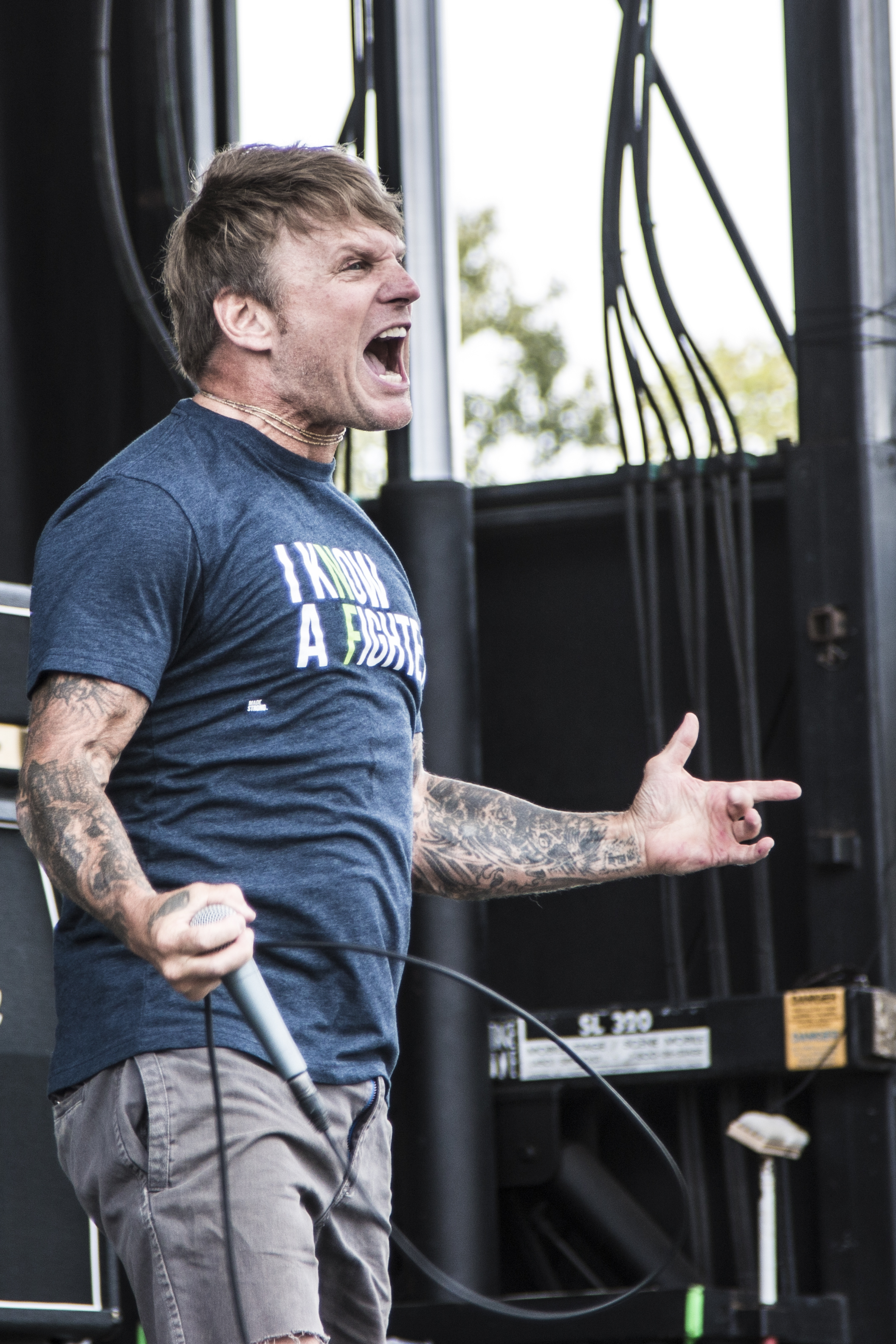
McGowan at the Gwar B-Q music festival 2015

Before, during, and after his time in the Cro-Mags, McGowan served as a roadie for Bad Brains, and portrayed a mentally handicapped Santa Claus in a wheelchair pretending to beg for donations. McGowan originally wanted to be a drummer, however Bad Brains lead singer H.R. told McGowan he had too much energy and should instead be a vocalist. So in 1981 McGowan and the rest of the Bad Brains roadies formed a band called Bloodclot and opened for them on their 1981 Summer tour.

McGowan then joined the New York City hardcore punk band Cro-Mags in 1981 as the lead singer and then again from 1984 until 1987, taking over on vocals from Eric Casanova. And rejoined in 1991 - He sang on a demo and wrote lyrics on the band's first, third, and fourth albums (The Age of Quarrel, Alpha Omega, and Near Death Experience). He also sings lead on the Before the Quarrel CD, essentially a reissue of the demo. The group disbanded in 2002, however McGowan and original drummer Mackie Jayson began playing shows under the Cro-Mags name again in 2009. With other notable NYC hardcore musicians such as Craig Setari from Sick of It All on bass and A.J. Novello from Leeway on guitar.

In 2018, original bass player Harley Flanagan filed a federal trademark infringement suit against McGowan and Jayson in the Southern District of New York. In April 2019, Flanagan announced a settlement wherein he would own exclusive rights to the name Cro-Mags; simultaneously, Joseph announced his recognition of the settlement, and that he and his band would perform as the Cro-Mags JM, having been granted a limited license to use the name in this manner, beginning in August 2019. Infringement by Joseph in 2022 resulted in a permanent injunction granted by the Federal District Court of the Southern District of New York. The rights to the Cro-Mags name now belong exclusively to Flanagan.

In 2024, McGowan revealed he would never take part in a Cro-Mags reunion with the classic lineup.

=== Bloodclot ===
McGowan is also the lead singer of the hardcore band Bloodclot which can trace it’s origins back to 1981, when the idea was hatched during a Cro-Mags tour with Bad Brains. In 2008, Joesph transformed the group from a live act to a studio one, recording their debut Burn Babylon Burn! and releasing it via an independent label. In 2016, McGowan recruited an entirely new lineup consisting of Todd Youth, Nick Oliveri and Joey Castillo. The group signed with Metal Blade Records, to release their second studio album Up In Arms in 2017, and embarked on a worldwide tour. In 2022, McGowan once again recruited a whole new lineup featuring guitarist Tom Capone, bassist Craig Setari and drummer Darren Morgenthaler to release their third album Souls.

=== Both Worlds ===
In the mid 1990s McGowan started another band called Both Worlds which included A.J. Novello, bassist Eddie Coen, and drummer Pokey. who released an EP in 1996 called Beyond Zero Gravity. The group then began touring cross-country opening for bands such as Misfits, Helmet, and Life of Agony. The group then signed with Roadrunner Records to release their debut album Memory Rendered Visible in 1998.

=== Other works ===
After getting released from jail McGowan worked as a bicycle messenger in New York City from 1981 to 1991.

Interviews with McGowan were featured in the 1999 documentary N.Y.H.C. as well as the 2006 documentary American Hardcore.

In 2018, McGowan began uploading plant-based cooking recipes on his YouTube channel The Hard Truth with John Joesph.

== Published works ==
McGowan authored Evolution of a Cro-Magnon (2007) which details the major events in his life, including his extensive involvement with the hare krishnas, as well his experiences with the Cro-Mags and Bad Brains. As well as Meat Is for Pussies (2010). The PMA Effect (2018) is a self improvement book on how to achieve a positive mental attitude and Unf*ck Your Health (2025) touches upon food and health problems such obesity and world hunger along with including multiple recipes.

== Personal life ==
McGowan follows a plant-based diet. He was a vegan prior to becoming plant-based. He lives a straight edge lifestyle, but does not identify with its subculture. He is also a spiritual person and was first introduced to spiritually and the vegan lifestyle in the 1980s while working with the Bad Brains he stated "It wasn’t until I met the Bad Brains in 1980 that I started getting into yoga and meditation and stopped eating meat. I just had this conversation with the singer all about spirituality. And they gave me a job, and they were like, ‘You can’t do drugs, and you can’t eat meat."

McGowan got into the Hare Krishnas in 1982, which inspired him to get involved with charitable causes. He started his own food program in Tompkins Square Park in 1982 to feed the homeless. He and the Cro-Mags later held a benefit concert in Tompkins Square Park called "Rock Against Maya." He later opened a soup kitchen on 4th Street in Manhattan along with a Yoga studio that gave free Yoga lessons for which he owned and operated for 10 years.

In 2007, McGowan completed his first marathon the "Marine Corps Marathon" and has since transitioned into being a triathlete competitor and first started training in 2012. His first triathlon was an Iron Man which took place on August 11, 2012, he has since completed in multiple other competitions.

He writes about his "positive mental attitude" and vegan lifestyle, and he is known for his anti-vaccine stance against mandatory vaccine policy requirements. During the 2019 government shutdown McGowan criticized U.S. President Donald Trump, urging him to cease "acting like a f**king five-year-old" and reopen operations to allow workers to support their families. McGowan has also openly expressed his dismay of cancel culture.

== Discography ==
=== Cro-Mags ===
- The Age of Quarrel (1986)
- Alpha Omega (1992)
- Near Death Experience (1993)

=== Bloodclot ===
- Burn Babylon Burn! (2008)
- Up In Arms (2017)
- Souls (2022)

=== Both Worlds ===
- Beyond Zero Gravity EP (1996)
- Memory Rendered Visible (1998)
