= Doug Holland =

American musician (born 1962)

Douglas William Paul Lozito (born March 7, 1962, in Manhattan, New York City), known professionally as Doug Holland, is an American musician, vocalist, and songwriter for New York hardcore bands Kraut and Cro-Mags. He was a bartender and manager at the A7 club in New York from 1981 until it closed in 1984.
