= New York hardcore =

Punk music and associated subculture

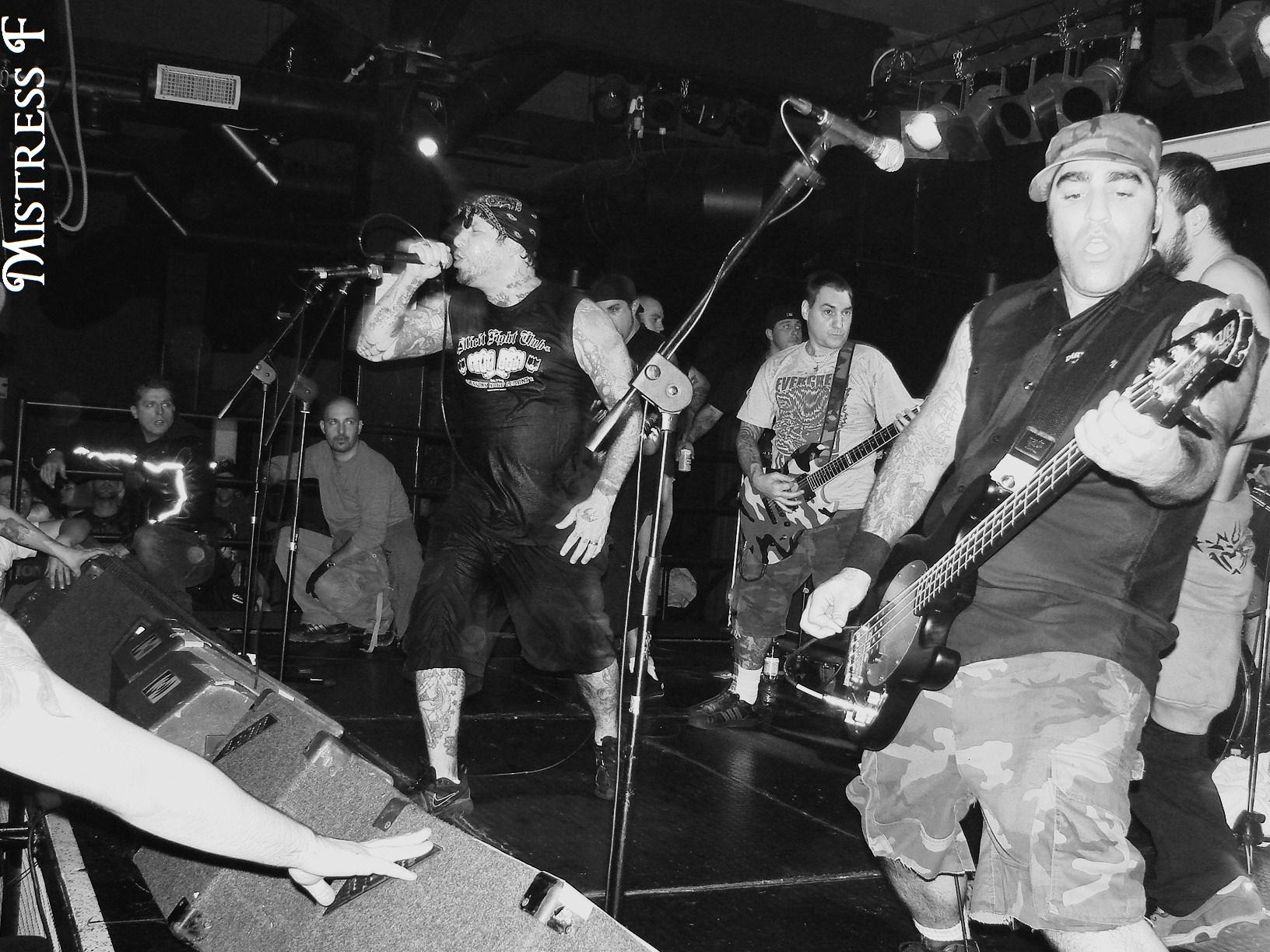
Agnostic Front playing in Rome, Italy in 2007

New York hardcore (also known as NYHC) is both the hardcore punk music created in New York City and the subculture and lifestyle associated with that music. The scene established many aspects that are fixtures of hardcore punk today, including its simplified name "hardcore", its hardcore skinhead and youth crew subcultures, the moshing style hardcore dancing, its association with street gangs and its prominent influence of heavy metal.

The scene experienced many distinct waves and deviations in style: early 1980s bands who directly outgrew the earlier punk scene including Agnostic Front, Reagan Youth and Kraut began the scene. In the mid–1980s, the Cro-Mags, Leeway and Stormtroopers of Death embraced the influence of the nascent thrash metal genre, helping to pioneer crossover thrash. In the mid-to-late 1980s, a reaction against this metal influence saw Youth of Today, Gorilla Biscuits and Bold established the youth crew subculture, which revived hardcore's punk–based roots. However, by the end of the decade, thrash metal's influence permeated the scene again establishing a new form, tough guy hardcore, played by Sick of It All, Breakdown, Madball and Killing Time. During the 1990s, the sound of New York hardcore largely diversified: Helmet, Quicksand and Life of Agony helped to establish the alternative metal genre, while Bulldoze and 25 ta Life pioneered beatdown hardcore and Merauder, All Out War and Vision of Disorder becoming prominent forces in metalcore. Furthermore Biohazard, Cro-Mags and Skarhead embracing influences from hip hop and H_{2}O and CIV creating music indebted to pop music.

== History ==
=== 1980s ===
==== Origins ====
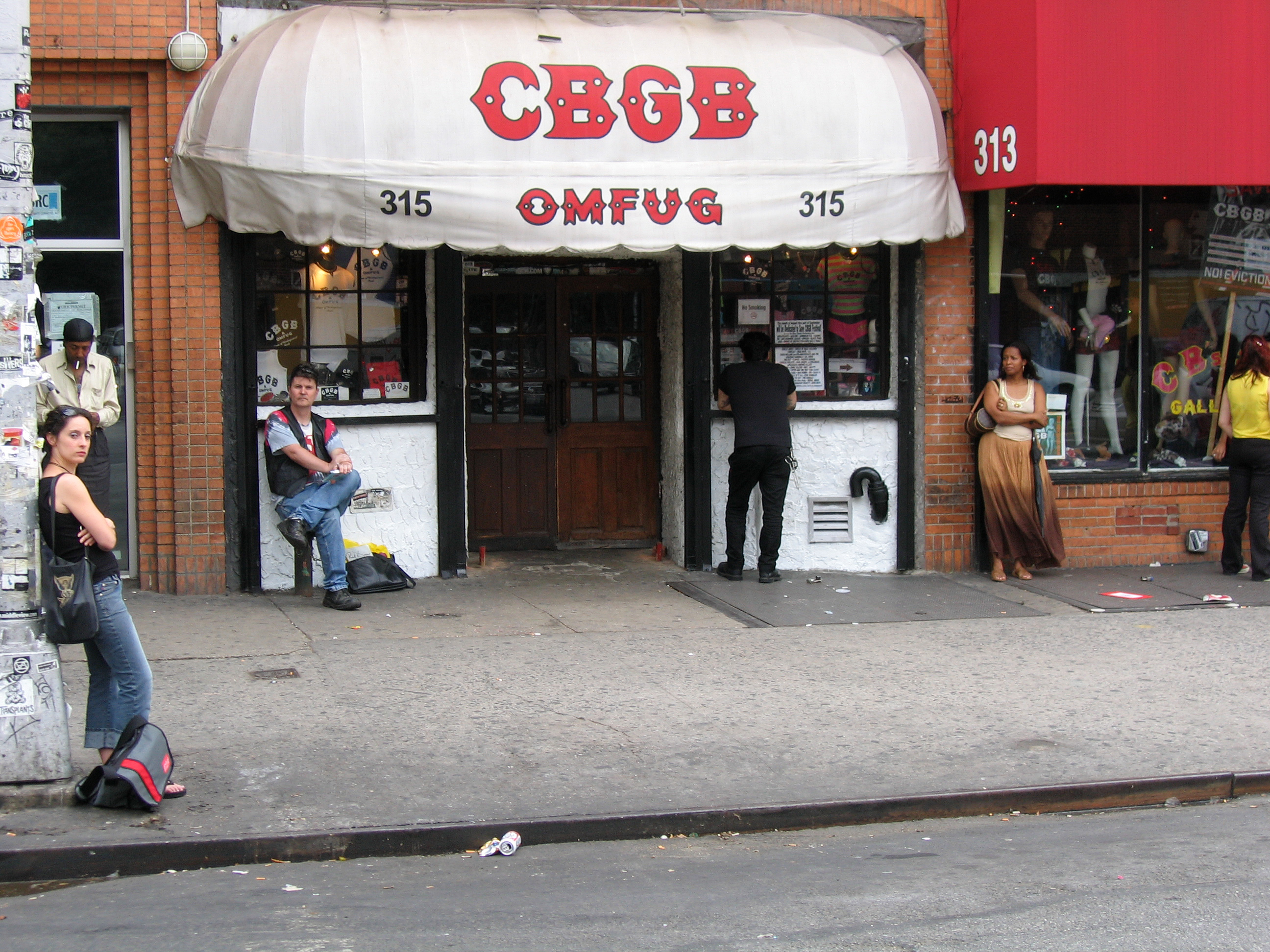
CBGB was one of the main venues for the New York hardcore scene

The origins of New York's punk rock scene can be traced back to such sources as late 1960s trash culture and an early 1970s underground rock movement centered on the Mercer Arts Center in Greenwich Village, where the New York Dolls performed. In early 1974, this early punk scene began to develop around the CBGB club, also in lower Manhattan, featuring groups and musicians like Television, Richard Hell, Patti Smith, the Ramones, the Heartbreakers and Jayne County The New York hardcore scene particularly grew of out of the section of this punk scene that was documented on the 1982 New York Thrash compilation, with groups like the Stimulators, the Eliminators and the Mad.

After the breakup of the Eliminators, the band's bass player Vinnie Stigma formed Agnostic Front. The band soon became the godfathers of New York Hardcore and one of the scene's most crucial bands. Around the same time the term "hardcore" started being used instead of "punk rock". Roger Miret of Agnostic Front asserts that "We started using the term 'hardcore' because we wanted to separate ourselves from the punk scene that was happening in New York at the time ... We were rougher kids living in the streets. It had a rougher edge". The scene emerged around 1981, when members of Agnostic Front, Cause for Alarm, Kraut, Murphy's Law and Antidote began to spend time together on Avenue A and performing at A7 in Manhattan. Rock clubs like Max's Kansas City, the Ritz and CBGB's also quickly became crucial spots for this newly formed scene.

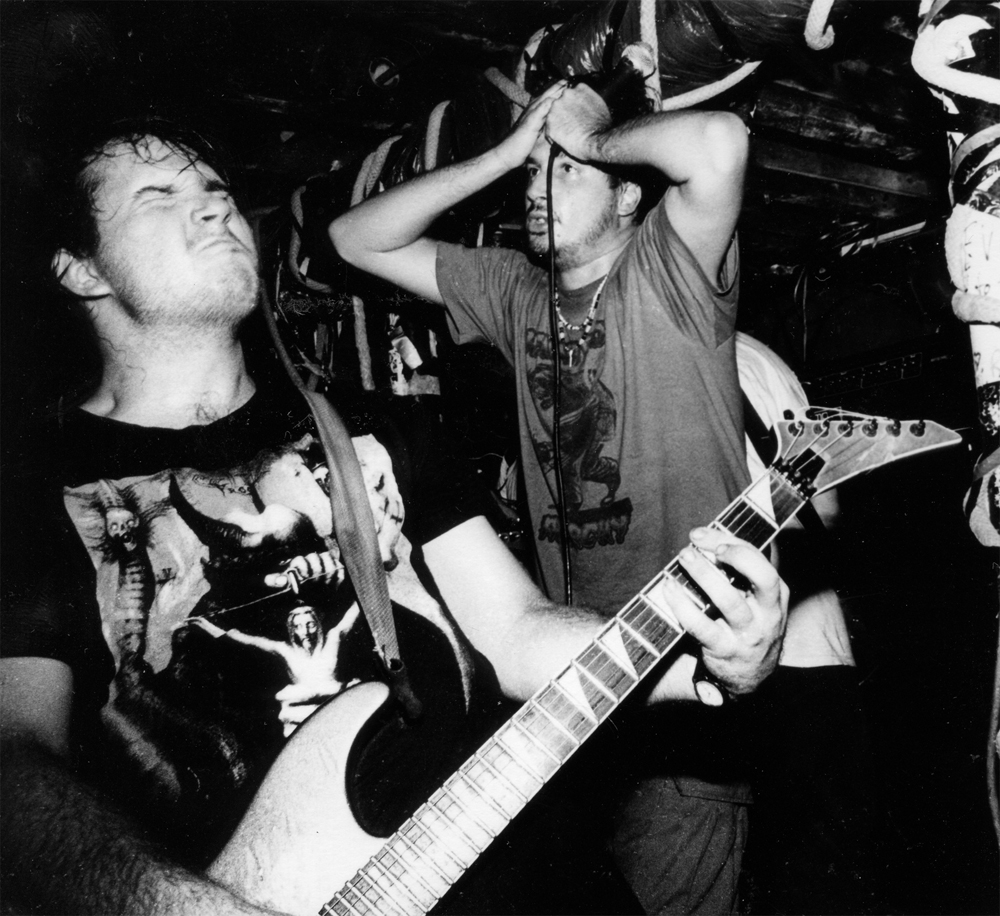
Florida band Assück playing New York venue ABC No Rio

Early in the decade, many bands were inspired by the British anarcho-punk scene. Beginning as a part of the larger New York hardcore scene, bands like Reagan Youth, False Prophets and Heart Attack made use of a similar musical style and mentality to their British counterparts. This scene split from New York hardcore as the decade progressed. Nausea were a key figure in the scene during this period, helping to cultivate a new scene in the city based around politics and squatting.

==== Crossover thrash ====
After the release of Metallica's 1983 debut album Kill 'Em All, New York hardcore bands began embracing elements of heavy metal music, especially thrash metal. This event caused the scene to expand, with the average attendance at shows jumping from around 100 to over 400. One of the earliest New York hardcore bands to embrace heavy metal influences was NYC Mayhem. In the following years, many crossover thrash bands began to form within the scene, notably Leeway, Crumbsuckers, Nuclear Assault and Ludichrist. New York metal bands like Anthrax and Carnivore began attending and performing at hardcore shows, and many original NYHC bands became increasingly heavier and harder in sound as the metal influences grew stronger, consequently some NYHC bands who were previously skinheads started growing their hair and adopting metal looks. Agnostic Front released the crossover album Cause for Alarm in 1986, which led many in the scene to deride them as sell outs. Writer Freddie Alva stated in a 2014 article that "[Cause for Alarm's] combination of heavy metal precision and hardcore energy created a landmark for the crossover sound".

The Cro-Mags released the crossover album, Best Wishes in 1989, which also heavily impacted the scene. The album was cited as a major influence by much of the 1990s New York hardcore scene, particularly Biohazard, Merauder and Candiria.

==== Youth crew ====
Youth crew was a movement that began in the mid-to-late 1980s as a reaction against the metal influences being embraced in New York hardcore. Youth crew bands began playing a sound that called back to earlier punk rock–leaning hardcore acts. The movement was fronted by Youth of Today, who coined the name on their 1985 song "Youth Crew". Gorilla Biscuits and Bold were also prominent bands in the style. Straight edge and vegetarianism were also defining features of this movement, however this led to many older members of the scene rejecting the movement. Because of this, New York youth crew became an isolated entity separate from the wider hardcore scene. Bands such as Sick of It All and Warzone emerged from the youth crew scene, though they did not necessarily adhere to all of its elements. Both bands would go on to become influential to many subsequent hardcore bands. Later youth crew bands, namely Judge, began to take heavily from metal, helping to lead to the development of heavy hardcore. New York youth crew began to decline in popularity and prominence following the 1988 Tompkins Square Park riot and 1990 departure of Ray Cappo from Youth of Today.

==== Tough guy hardcore ====
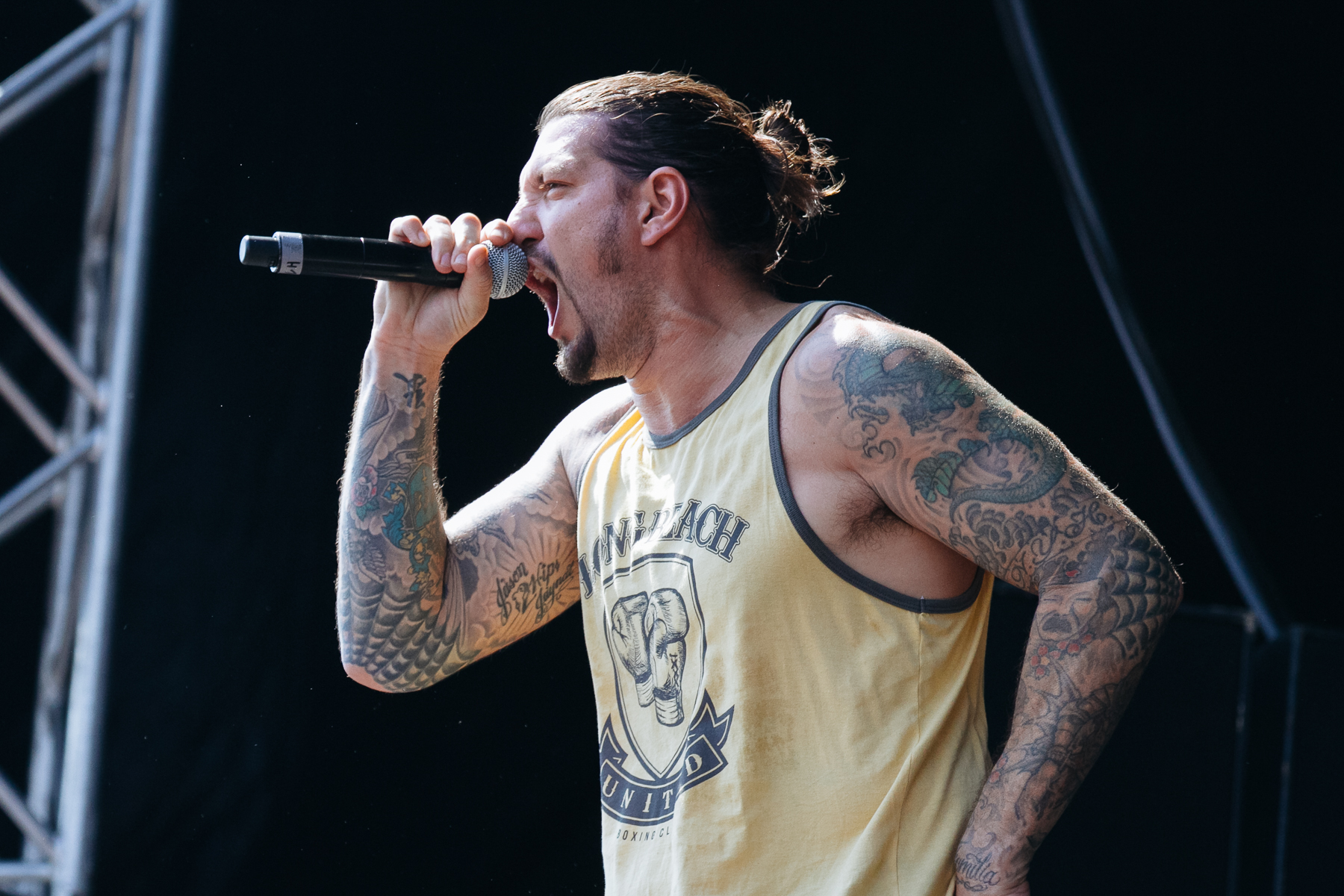
Madball, described by Stereogum as "an archetypal tough-guy hardcore band"

As the scene progressed many bands began to emerge that took significant influence from heavy metal and hip hop. Some musicians in the New York hardcore scene cultivated a "tough guy ethos" through use of aggression, criminal violence and gang mentalities.

Over time, many of these bands began to develop a unique style that was based more around rhythm and less around the influence of punk. The palm muting guitar technique was a key aspect of this sound, as well as gang vocals, heavy guitar riffs and heavy breakdowns. According to writer Tony Rettman, in his book NYHC (2015), Yonkers, New York band Breakdown, formed in 1987, were one of the first bands to define tough guy hardcore. The same year Judge released their debut EP New York Crew, which Crack magazine described as the record that took New York's "tough guy mentality to new heights". Other bands pushing this sound at the time included Sick of It All, Sheer Terror and Killing Time. Madball, formed in 1988, were credited by Riverfront Times as the band that defined tough guy hardcore, and by Stereogum as "an archetypal tough-guy hardcore band". During the 1990s, they become of the most prominent bands in New York hardcore.

Gradually, tough guy hardcore became so ubiquitous of the New York hardcore that the style became popularly known as simply "New York hardcore". Through the 1990s and 2000s, the sound was expanded upon by groups from outside of New York, including Blood for Blood, Death Before Dishonor, Terror and Trapped Under Ice. Ultimately, tough guy hardcore became a more dominant sound in the hardcore scene than its original punk-based sound, becoming what is thought of "when you say 'hardcore'". It influenced the development of beatdown hardcore, brutal death metal, slam death metal and deathcore.

=== 1990s ===
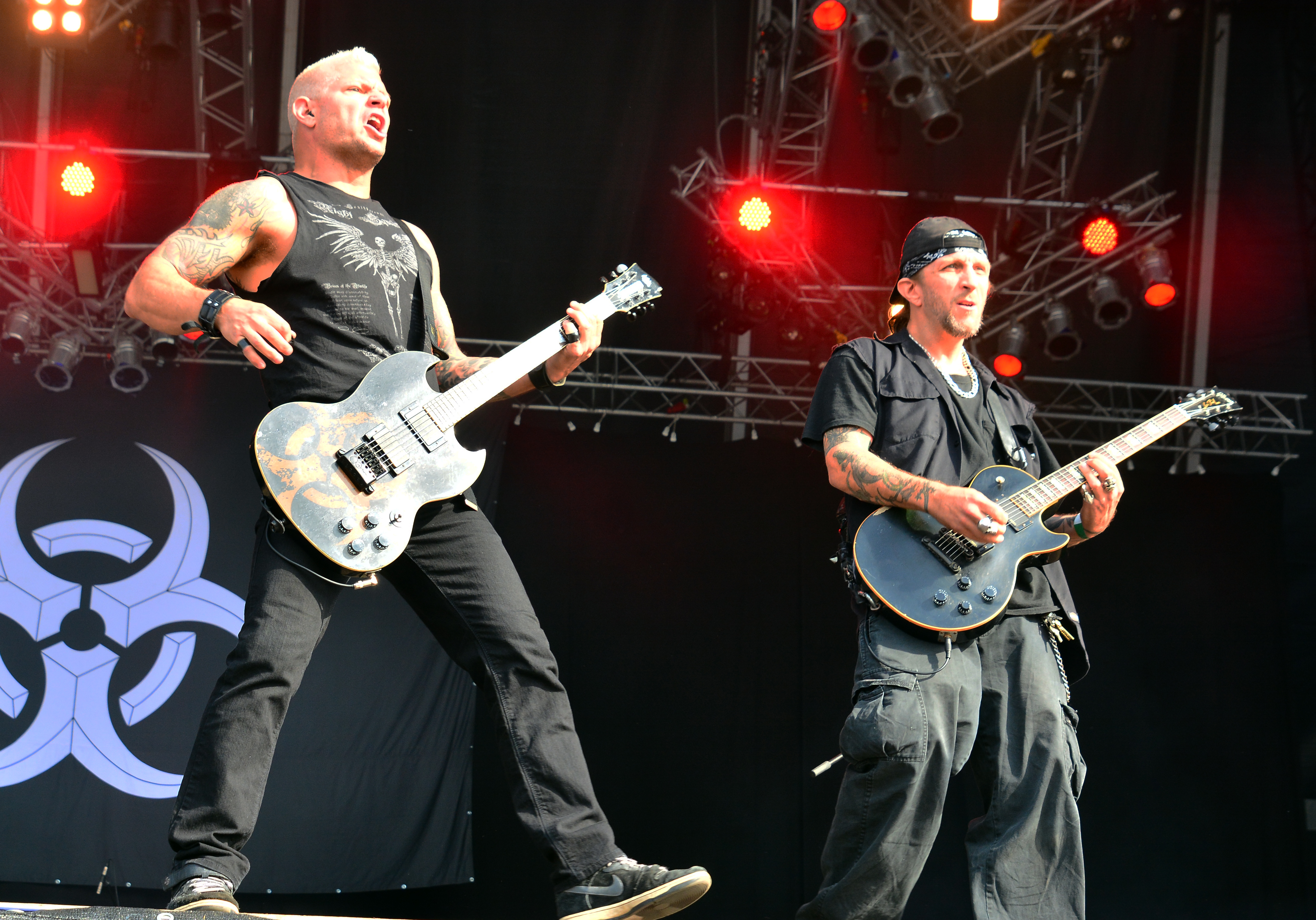
Biohazard, one of the most commercially successful bands to come from the New York hardcore scene

During the 1990s, the sound of New York hardcore bands diversified, with the influence of thrash metal and death metal becoming increasingly common. Groups like Biohazard, Madball, Skarhead and 25 Ta Life became influenced by hip-hop music, an influence which permeated through most of the mid to late 1990s NYHC scene. Biohazard's merger of hip hop and tough guy hardcore, in particular, was widely successful, with their 1992 single "Punishment" gaining significant airplay on MTV. The band's 1993 collaboration with rap group Onyx on the remix of "Slam" was certified platinum and the band would go on to be cited as an influence by nu metal pioneers Korn.

At this time, members of New York hardcore bands began to form new bands which played alternative metal including Shelter, Quicksand, Orange 9mm and Helmet. The Cro-Mags third album Alpha Omega (1992) saw the band lean further into their metal influence, while incorporating conventional singing and experimenting with rap metal on "Eyes Of Tomorrow". Life of Agony were one of the most prominent, the vinyl edition of their debut album River Runs Red (1993) peaking at number 11 on the Billboard Vinyl Albums chart. In May 2005, the album inducted into the Decibel Magazine Hall of Fame; it was fourth album overall to be featured. Furthermore, many New York hardcore musicians began to pursue more pop–influenced styles, including. H_{2}O, CIV and nearby Lifetime. Concurrently, the scene was primarily based around the Bond Street Café on Bond Street, Manhattan. By 1993, Brownies, Coney Island High and the Wetlands Preserve became frequented venues, and CBGB recommended hosting Sunday matinees.

In the mid-1990s, the New York hardcore scene expanded outward into much of the New York metropolitan area and New York state, which gave rise to Vision of Disorder, Crown of Thornz and No Redeeming Social Value. Bulldoze, whose members were from both Irvington, New Jersey and New York City, pioneered the beatdown hardcore subgenre. Their 1996 album The Final Beatdown giving the style its name. Originating from the earlier tough guy hardcore sound, Bulldoze, along with Terror Zone, created the genre bu merging the sound with lyrics of gang activity and heavy breakdowns to set the template for the genre. In their wake followed groups like Neglect, Confusion and 25 Ta Life.

New York City's Merauder released their debut album Master Killer in 1996, merging the sounds of metalcore, earlier New York hardcore and the newly emerged beatdown hardcore style. Of the album, Revolver writer Elis Enis stated "any self-proclaimed 'metallic hardcore' band of the last 25 years is indebted to Master Killer's steel-toed stomp." Along with All Out War, Darkside NYC and Confusion, Merauder were a part of a wave of bands defining a newer, increasingly metallic style of hardcore in New York that had long been one of the epicentres of metalcore. Long Island's Vision of Disorder were also a prevalent band in the scene, being one of the first bands to incorporate clean singing into metalcore, which would soon become a staple, as well as incorporating elements of nu metal. In a 2005 article by Billboard magazine, writer Greg Pato stated that "with seemingly every local teen waving the VOD banner circa the mid/late '90s, it seemed as though it was only a matter of time before VOD would become the band to take 'metalcore' to a massive audience".

== Culture ==
=== Crews ===
New York originated "hardcore crews". Sociology academic Edgar M. Peralta defined crews as being people involved in hardcore scene who unify "based on reciprocal ties and varying interests, including non-criminal elements such as music or sports, but also including some criminal elements, which often include violence and graffiti", specifically originating as a means to oppose the white supremacist currents in their scenes.

The most prominent crew in New York City is DMS (Doc Marten Skinheads) from the Lower East Side. Formed in the early 1980s by Jere DMS, the crew's embrace of elements of hardcore, hip-hop, graffiti, motorcycle, skinhead and skateboarding culture, and multi-ethnic membership led to it including members who would go on to form bands including Bulldoze, Madball and Skarhead.

The Sunset Skins were a New York hardcore crew established in Sunset Park, Brooklyn in 1987. Largely made up of Stateside Puerto Ricans, it included members who played in Merauder, All Out War, Direct Approach and Brute Force. It had largely disbanded by 1993, by which time the members of Merauder had joined DMS as their Brooklyn chapter.

=== Hare Krishna ===
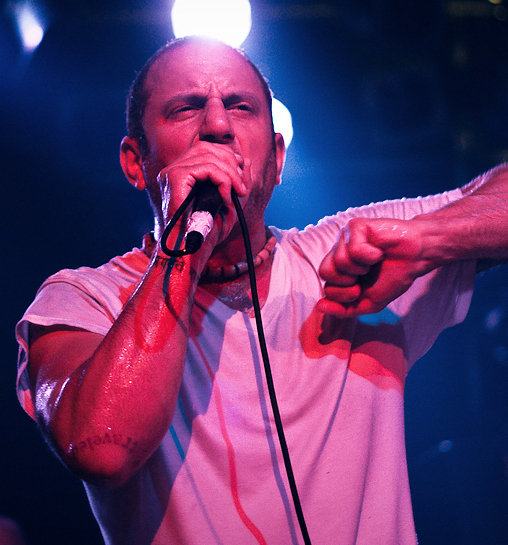
Ray Cappo, a prominent figure in the scene and an adherent of Hare Krishna

Beginning with Cro-Mags and inspired by the spirituality of the Bad Brains, many New York hardcore musicians are followers of the Gaudiya Vaishnavism religious organisation the International Society for Krishna Consciousness (ISKCON). Although some hardcore punk bands had already made references to Krishna Consciousness in the 1980s, the religion was most prominent through bands established in the early 1990s by the bands Shelter and 108. One of the first members of its scene to adopt Krishna Consciousness was John Joseph of the Cro-Mags. New York bands Antidote and Cause for Alarm were among the first that began to explore Krishna Consciousness in both their creative and personal lives, The main influence to on many musicians to embrace ISKCON was the Washington D.C.'s hardcore band the Bad Brains which, despite being Rastas, they "grafted fervent spirituality onto an otherwise nihilistic and antitranscendental genre."

=== Imagery ===
The New York hardcore logo

The "New York hardcore logo" is a symbol attached to the scene which features the letters "NYHC" within the quadrants of an X shape. The symbol was created by the Abused vocalist Kevin Crowley. According to Harley Flanagan, the use of the X was inspired by the crossed hammers on the logo of the English Football firm the Inter City Firm, which he witnessed when in London in the late 1970s.

Since its early stages, New York hardcore has been heavily associated with hardcore skinhead culture (unrelated to neo-Nazi skinheads), gang ideology and tattoo culture as well as squatting. In the mid to late 1980s, youth crew ideology and graffiti culture started to make an impact on the scene and had a long-lasting influence on the genre. Critics and observers have also noted an inspiration and influence from gritty, urban and/or dystopian films such as Death Wish, Taxi Driver, The Warriors, and Escape from New York. Historically, political stances in New York Hardcore have been varied and sometimes controversial.

=== Moshing ===
New York hardcore developed early slam dancing into what is now understood as moshing. In their distinction, participants may stay in one position on their own or collide with others, while executing a more exaggerated version of the arm and leg swinging of California slam dancing.

As fans of heavy metal began to attend New York hardcore performances, they developed their own style of dancing based on New York hardcore's style of slam dancing. Beginning around 1983, metalheads began to refer to the slower sections of hardcore songs as "mosh parts", while hardcore musicians had called them "skank parts". It was this group, particularly Scott Ian and Billy Milano who popularised the word "moshing". Ian and Milano's band Stormtroopers of Death released their debut album Speak English or Die in 1985, which included the track "Milano Mosh". This led to the term being applied to the style of dance. The same year, moshing began to incorporate itself into live performances by heavy metal bands, with one early example being during Anthrax's 1985 set at the Ritz. The term was then further popularised by Anthrax's 1987 song "Caught in a Mosh".

With the popularity of tough guy hardcore came increased violence during performance. To the extent that in the late-1980s, many clubs, namely CBGB began to refuse to book hardcore bands to perform, due to the increasing violence and gang behavior that was present at them. This also led many long time members of the scene to depart.

=== Politics ===
Some of the mid-1980s NYHC groups were aligned with right-wing ideology and had strong stances on immigration and patriotism, all the while openly condemning racism and nazism. Similarly, leftist groups associated with the scene such as Born Against and Nausea also exist within the scene. Naturally, conflict can sometimes arise between the two groups.

Sam McPheeters argues that:

What early New York Hardcore bands lacked in distinctive output, however, they more than compensated for in sheer menace. As the scene coalesced in Reagan's first term, the New York Hardcore scene—known in the shorthand of graffiti and knuckle tattoos as NYHC—injected class into the subculture in a way that no other city could. It was a world marinating in poverty and violence.

== See also ==
- List of New York hardcore bands
- Metalcore
- Moshing
- Music of New York City
- Straight edge
- Hardcore skinhead
