= Dog Eat Dog discography =

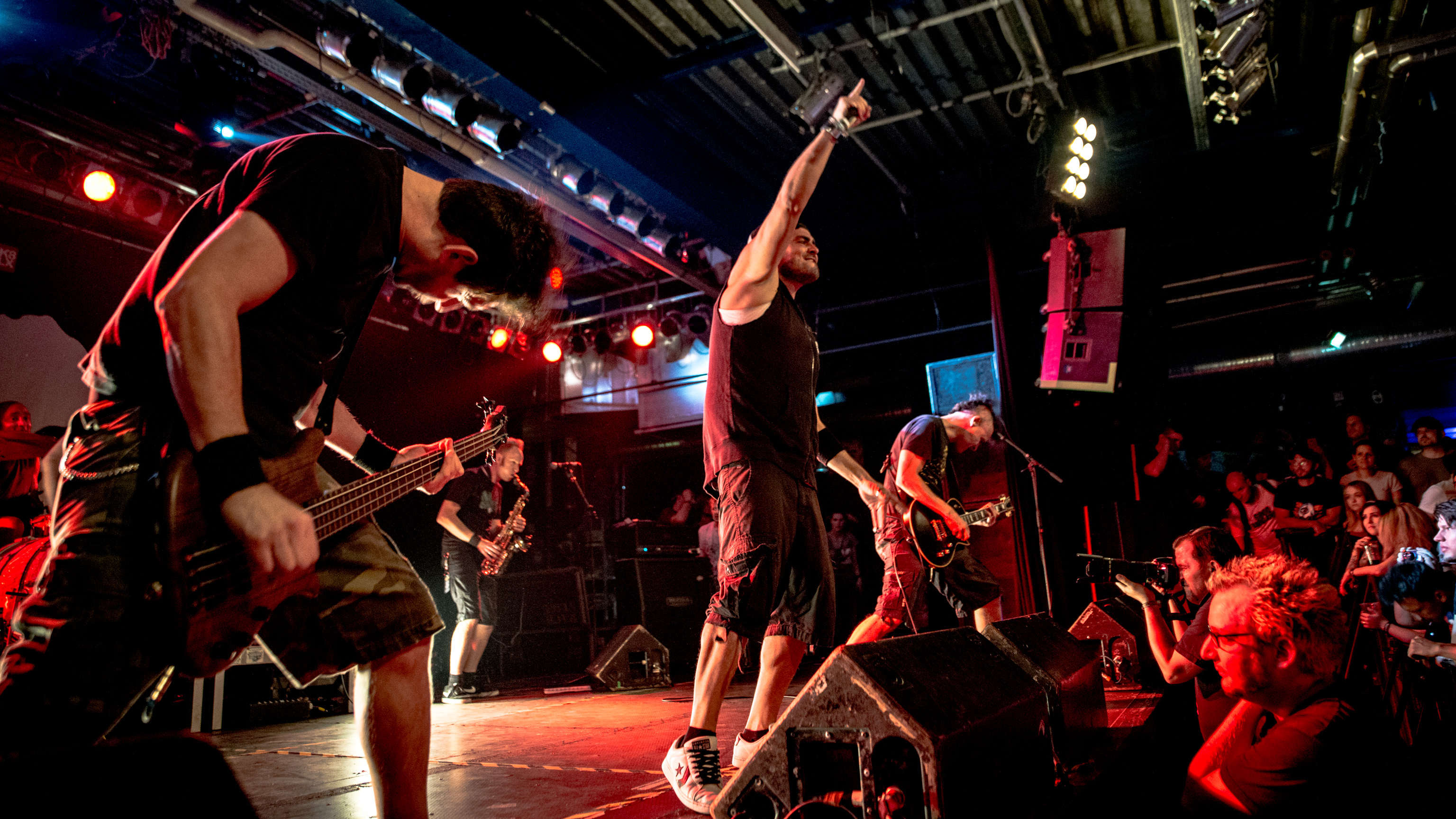
- Dog Eat Dog performing in 2014
- Studio albums: 5
- EPs: 2
- Demo albums: 2
- Live albums: 1
- Compilation albums: 1
- Singles: 15
- Video albums: 1
- Music videos: 12

Dog Eat Dog is an American rock band formed in Bergen County, New Jersey in 1990. They have released five studio albums, two EPs, one live album, one compilation album, 15 singles, one video album and 12 music videos. In 1993, they signed to Roadrunner Records, who released their debut EP Warrant. One year later, Roadrunner released the band's debut studio album All Boro Kings. The album was a success in Europe, peaking at top 20 in three countries, with the highest position being in Belgium (Flanders) where it peaked at number 16. The album also peaked at number 99 in UK Albums Chart, as well as number 7 in UK Rock & Metal chart. The album was certified gold in Netherlands in 2000, for selling 40,000 copies. The lead single "No Fronts" would peak at number 9 on the UK Album chart, as well as number 1 in UK Rock & Metal singles, staying on that position for three weeks. After a successful tour promoting the album, the band recorded their sophomore album, Play Games. The album displayed a change in sound from their previous material, but it was still a success in Europe, peaking at top 20 in four countries, with the highest position being in Austria and Belgium (Flanders), where it peaked at number 12. It also peaked at number 40 in the UK Albums chart, as well as peaking at number 5 on the UK Rock & Metal chart. The lead single "Isms" peaked at number 19 in Finland, as well as number 3 in UK Rock & Metal.

In 1999, Roadrunner released the band's third album, Amped. The album was released exclusively in Europe and was a commercial failure in comparison to previous two albums. It peaked at number 42 in Germany. The lead single "Expect The Unexpected" peaked at number 94 in UK Albums Chart. Due to disappointment with the label for not supporting the album, as well as it not being it released in their home country, the band left Roadrunner Records.

In 2001, Roadrunner released a compilation album titled In The Dog House: The Best And The Rest. The album was released without the band's input. Roadrunner would also release a video album titled Live At Dynamo in 2005. The album was recorded at the Dynamo Open Air festival in 1995. In 2006, Nuclear Blast Records and Wanted Records released the band's fourth album, titled Walk With Me.

In 2017, Metalville Records released the band's second EP, titled "Brand New Breed". In 2019, Metalville Records released the band's first live album, titled "All Boro Kings Live". In 2023, Metalville Records released Free Radicals, the band's fifth album.

== Albums ==
=== Studio albums ===
List of albums, with selected details, chart positions and certifications
Title	Album details	Peak chart positions										Sales	Certifications
Title	Album details	AUT	BEL (FL)	BEL (WA)	GER	NLD	SWI	FIN	SCO	UK	UK Rock	Sales	Certifications
All Boro Kings	Released: May 24, 1994; Label: Roadrunner	21	16	23	30	17	17	—	—	99	7	NLD: 40,000; WW: 600,000+	NVPI: Gold
Play Games	Released: July 2, 1996; Label: Roadrunner	12	12	20	13	26	22	14	67	40	5	BEL: 25,000	BEA: Gold
Amped	Released: June 14, 1999; Label: Roadrunner	—	—	—	42	—	—	—	—	—	—		
Walk With Me	Released: October 16, 2006; Label: Nuclear Blast / Wanted	—	—	—	—	—	—	—	—	—	—		
Free Radicals	Released: October 20, 2023; Label: Metalville	—	—	—	62	—	—	—	—	—	—		
"—" denotes releases that did not chart or were not released in that country.

=== Live albums ===
Title	Album details
All Boro Kings Live	Released: November 22, 2019; Label: Metalville

=== Compilation albums ===
Title	Album details
In The Dog House: The Best And The Rest	Released: May 22, 2001; Label: Roadrunner

=== Demo albums ===
Title	Album details
First Demo Tape	Released: 90s; Label: Self-released
Dog Eat Dog	Released: 1992; Label: Self-released

== EPs ==
Title	Album details
Warrant	Released: July 3, 1993; Label: Roadrunner
Brand New Breed	Released: December 7, 2018; Label: Metalville

== Singles ==
List of singles, with selected chart positions
Year	Single	Peak chart positions						Album
Year	Single	FIN	GER	NLD	SWE	UK	UKRock	Album
1994	No Fronts	—	—	—	—	—	—	All Boro Kings
1994	If These Are Good Times.../No Fronts	—	—	—	—	—	30	All Boro Kings
1995	Who's the King?	—	—	—	34	—	10	All Boro Kings
1995	No Fronts: The Remixes	—	45	20	—	9	1	All Boro Kings
1996	Isms	19	71	—	—	43	3	Play Games
1996	Rocky	—	—	—	—	—	—	Play Games
1997	Step Right In	—	—	—	—	—	—	Play Games
1999	Expect the Unexpected	—	—	—	—	94	—	Amped
2006	Summertime	—	—	—	—	—	—	Walk with Me
2017	Lumpy Dog	—	—	—	—	—	—	Brand New Breed (EP)
2017	Vibe Cartel	—	—	—	—	—	—	Brand New Breed (EP)
2023	Lit Up	—	—	—	—	—	—	Free Radicals
2023	Never Give In	—	—	—	—	—	—	Free Radicals
2023	Man's Best Friend	—	—	—	—	—	—	Free Radicals
2023	Bar Down	—	—	—	—	—	—	Free Radicals
"—" denotes releases that did not chart or were not released.

== Videography ==
=== Video Albums ===
Title	Album details
Live At Dynamo	Released: 2005; Label: Roadrunner
"—" denotes releases that did not chart or were not released in that country.

=== Music Videos ===
Year	Song	Album	Location	Director
1994	No Fronts	All Boro Kings	Pipeline Newark, New Jersey	N/A
1995	Who's the King?	All Boro Kings	Chinatown, New York City	N/A
1995	No Fronts (Jam Master Jay's Main Edit)	No Fronts: The Remixes (Single)	Paris, France	N/A
1996	Isms	Play Games	Los Angeles, California	Michael Lucero
1996	Rocky	Play Games	San Francisco, California	
1999	Expect The Unexpected	Amped	N/A	
2017	Vibe Cartel	Brand New Breed (EP)	N/A	
2023	Lit Up	Free Radicals	N/A	
2023	Never Give In	Free Radicals	Hellfest, Wacken Open Air, Punk Rock Holiday	
2023	Man's Best Friend	Free Radicals	N/A	
2023	Bar Down	Free Radicals	N/A	
