= Nelson DeCastro =

American comic book artist (born 1969)

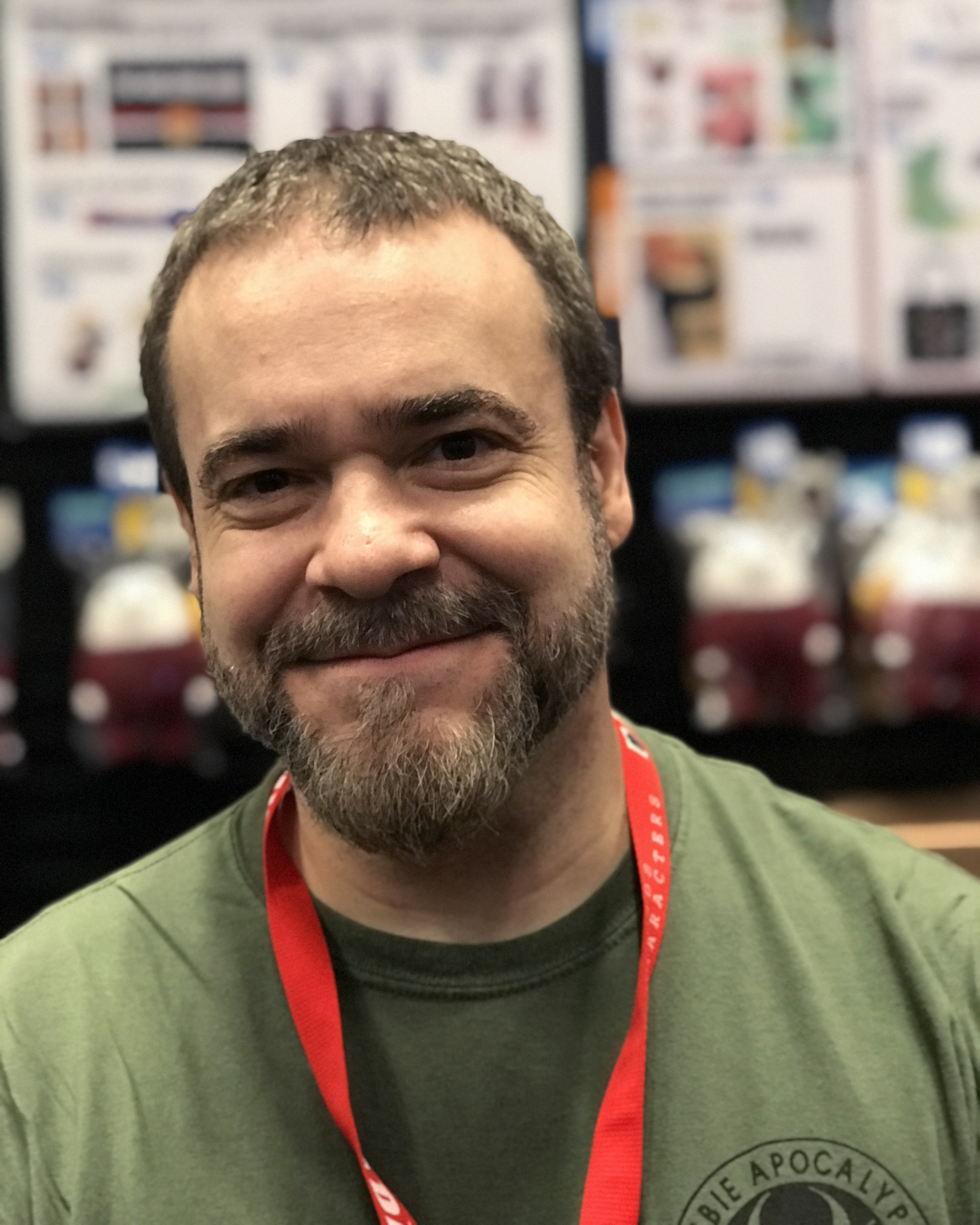
- DeCastro at the New York Comic Con
- Born: Nelson Faro DeCastro; February 17, 1969 (age 57)
- Areas: Writer, Penciller, Artist, Inker, Colourist
- Pseudonym: Nelson
- Notable works: Robocop: Prime Suspect, Eudaemon, Green Lantern Corps

Nelson Faro DeCastro, known professionally as Nelson (born February 17, 1969), is an American comic book artist known for his airbrushed cover art, and his interior penciling, inking and coloring work. He is also a writer and teacher. Nelson's career began in the early 1990s, doing cover work and publishing his creator-owned work for Dark Horse Comics, before becoming a frequent artist for both Marvel Comics and DC Comics.

== Early life ==
Nelson Faro DeCastro was born February 17, 1969. His earliest memory of reading comics is of a Spider-Man book featuring the Gibbon, illustrated by John Romita Sr., whom he cites as his primary artistic influence. Other influences he names include Caravaggio, Joe Jusko, Frank Frazetta, and Simon Bisley.

Nelson studied art at the School of Visual Arts in Manhattan.

== Career ==
=== 1990s ===
Before his comic book career began, DeCastro created artwork for the band Mucky Pup, with whom he was friends. He provided the interior art for their 1987 album Can't You Take a Joke?, and the cover art for their 1989 album, A Boy In A Man's World.

DeCastro broke into the American comic book industry in 1992 doing airbrushed cover work for various Dark Horse Comics series, including Insider vol. 2, #6, and the four-issue limited series RoboCop: Prime Suspect. In 1993 he wrote and illustrated his own creator-owned horror character, Eudaemon, in the anthology Dark Horse Presents #72-74, for which he provided the first issue's cover. He would later publish through Dark Horse a three-issue Eudaemon series, which he wrote, pencilled, and inked, and for which he provided airbrush-painted covers.

His first work for Marvel Comics was a six-page story he penciled and inked for the company's Custom Comic division. He would also provide the publisher with a painted cover for Ghost Rider #18 in 1991. His first work for DC Comics was interior art for Team Superman Secret Files and Origins #1, which was published in 1998. Other DC work during the 1990s includes Birds of Prey: The Ravens #1.

In 1999, DeCastro worked for Marvel Comics, beginning with a painted cover and the interior art for X-Men: The Magneto War #1. His other Marvel work that year included issues of Generation X, Black Panther and X-Force.

=== 2000s ===
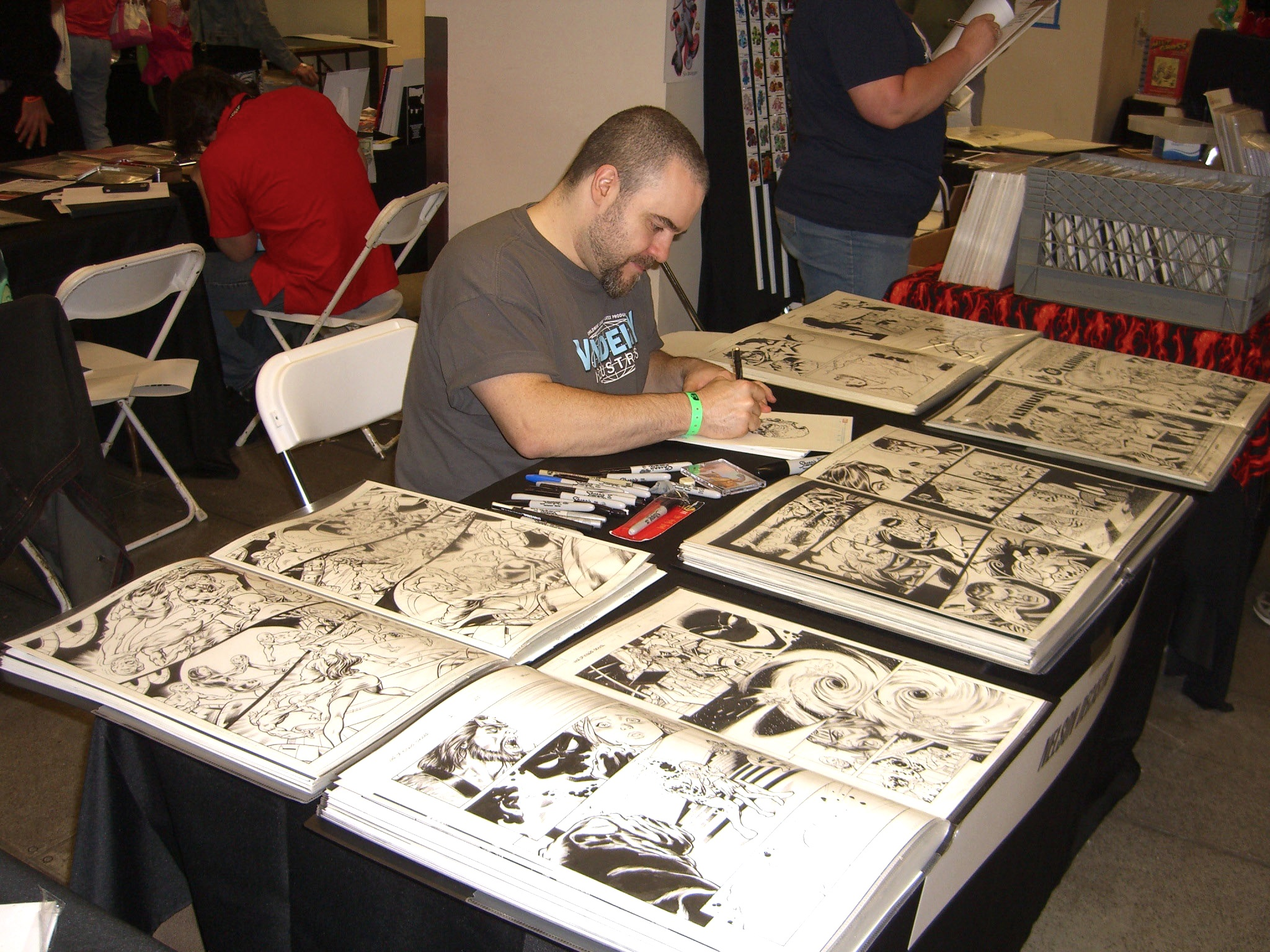
DeCastro drawing at the Big Apple Convention, May 22, 2011

DeCastro continued to work for Marvel Comics in the early 2000s, on such titles as Iron Man, Ant-Man's Big Christmas, Generation X, Marvel Knights, Elektra, and Inhumans.

He also provided work for DC Comics, on Birds of Prey and 2004's The DC Comics Encyclopedia. His other mid-2000s work for DC included doing inks for Superman: The Journey and inking over John Byrne's pencils and providing his first interior color work on Action Comics #831.

DeCastro branched out into educational comics with 2005's The Home Depot: Safety Heroes, a giveaway from the Home Depot featuring several Marvel Comics characters, as well as into Marvel's mature readers imprint, MAX, with Doctor Spectrum, two issues of which he inked, and Marvel's Ultimate line, providing interior inks for three issues of the miniseries Ultimate Nightmare and Ultimate Galactus Trilogy.

Although he mostly worked for Marvel Comics in the late 2000s, in 2008 DeCastro provided the interior pencils and inks for DC's Green Lantern Corps #21-22.

2009 marked DeCastro's first foray into writing for Marvel with the story "The Strange Bonds of Strange People", which appeared in Astonishing Tales: The Thing #1 by Marvel Digital Comics. He also provided inks for War of Kings: Savage World of Skaar, for which he was credited on the cover as "DeCastro", and not "Nelson", as he is typically credited. That year he also inked issues of Incredible Hercules, and penciled and inked Iron Man: Iron Protocols.

=== Other work ===
As of 2010, DeCastro teaches a Drawing for Cartoonists course at Manhattan's School of Visual Arts, where he himself once studied.

DeCastro has illustrated cards for the Magic: The Gathering collectible card game.

== Personal life ==
DeCastro is an avid guitar player, and expressed a desire to try sculpture, though he laments that he has trouble finding the time.

== Bibliography ==
=== Writer ===
- Astonishing Tales: The Thing (2009)
- Eudaemon #1-3 (1993)

=== Penciller ===
- Astonishing Tales: The Thing
- Birds of Prey: The Ravens
- The DC Comics Encyclopedia (2004)
- Generation X
- Iron Man: Iron Protocols (2009)
- Team Superman Secret Files and Origins #1 (1998)
- X-Force #95
- Eudaemon #1-3 (1993)

=== Inker ===
- War of Kings: Savage World of Skaar (2009)
- Ultimate Galactus Trilogy (2007)
- Ant-Man's Big Christmas #1
- Astonishing Tales: The Thing #1
- Birds of Prey #44 & #46
- Black Panther #11 & #12
- Captain America & the Falcon
- Doctor Spectrum
- Elektra
- Generation X #51
- The Home Depot: Safety Heroes #1
- Incredible Hercules #132, 134 & 136
- Inhumans #3, 4, 7 & 9
- Iron Man #1/2
- Iron Man: Iron Protocols
- Marvel Knights #7 - 9
- Superman: The Journey
- Team Superman Secret Files and Origins (1998)
- The Tomb of Dracula #3
- Ultimate Nightmare #2 - 5 (2004)
- Wolverine #17
- Eudaemon #1-3 (1993)

=== Colorist ===
- Action Comics #831

=== Cover artist ===
- Astonishing Tales: The Thing (2009)
- X-Men: The Magneto War (1999)
- Eudaemon #1-3 (1993)
- RoboCop: Prime Suspect #1-4 (1992–93)
- The Punisher: G-Force (1992)
- Insider Vol. 2 (1991)
