= Act of Faith (album) =

Studio album by Mucky Pup
- Released: 1992
- Recorded: 1991
- Genre: Hardcore punk, punk rock
- Label: Century Media
- Producer: Chris Milnes (for Bullet-Proof Productions)

Mucky Pup chronology
Now (1990)	Act of Faith (1992)	Lemonade (1993)

Act of Faith is the fourth studio album by the American band Mucky Pup. It was released in 1992.

It was the last studio album to feature founding member and guitarist Dan Nastasi. It features the debuts of bassist Christopher "Junior" LaPlante and keyboardist Kevin Powers. A video was shot for the song "Mr. Hand."

== Critical reception ==
Professional ratings
Review scores
Source	Rating
AllMusic	3/5 stars
The Encyclopedia of Popular Music	3/5 stars

The Toronto Star noted that the band "gnaw away at hardcore, power pop and the heavier end of psychedelia and don't shy from tossing samples and snatches from instruments other than the basic guitars, bass and drums into the mix."

== Tracks ==
1. Freakin' at the Peepshow 4:31
2. Mr. Hand 2:46
3. Understand 3:02
4. Please Don't Burn the Johnson 2:57
5. I Am 4:11
6. Summertime 3:21
7. Gotta Go 3:52
8. Angry Song 4:49
9. Mucky Pumpin' Motion 2:44
10. The Skinheads Broke My Walkman 2:18
11. Blowtorch 3:36
12. Lonely as Me 3:18

== Personnel ==
- Chris Milnes – Vocals
- John Milnes – Drums
- Dan Nastasi – Guitar
- Christopher "Junior" LaPlante – Bass
- Kevin Powers – Keys
