= Lemonade (Mucky Pup album) =

Studio album by Mucky Pup
- Released: 1993
- Recorded: 1992
- Genre: Alternative metal, hardcore punk, punk rock
- Label: Century Media Records
- Producer: Glen Cummings, Kevin Powers and Chris Milnes

Mucky Pup chronology
Act of Faith (1992)	Lemonade (1993)	Five Guys in a Really Hot Garage (1995)

Lemonade is the fifth studio album by Mucky Pup, released in 1993, and was the last record for Century Media Records. This album saw the band's style change by moving away from their comedic humorous songs into a more aggressive yet melodic sound. Since Dan Nastasi and Christopher "Junior" LaPlante left the band, John Milnes moved to guitar, Kevin Powers became the band's drummer, and piano and synthesizer were added. The album also saw the return of Marc DeBacker on bass. Glen Cummings from Scatterbrain became a co-producer for the band, and also played guitar on two songs.

The album was rated an eight out of ten by Rock Hard.

== Track listing ==
1. "Own Up For What You Say" - 4:30
2. "Junkie Eyes" - 3:26
3. "Three Sides" - 3:37
4. "Beautiful People" - 3:43
5. "Mountain Song" - 3:07
6. "The T.V.'s On Fire" - 2:25
7. "Deja Vu" - 5:44
8. "Two Little Men" - 3:49
9. "If Wishes Were Fishes" - 4:06
10. "Confessions" - 3:03
11. "Mountain Song 2" - 2:56
12. "Darkwave Sleeps" - 1:54

== Personnel ==
- Chris Milnes - lead vocals, lyrics, guitar, tambourine
- John Milnes - lead/rhythm guitar
- Marc DeBacker - bass guitar
- Kevin Power - drums, samples, piano, synthesizer
- Glen Cummings - lead guitar on "The T.V.'s On Fire" and "Darkwave Sleeps"

Production

- Artwork, design, computer graphics by David Bornguesser
- Assistant engineer – Rick Deardorff
- Mastered by Chris Gerringer
- Artwork, design - Chris Milnes
- Recorded & mixed by Ben Elliot
