= Mucky Pup =

American rock band

- Origin: Bergenfield, New Jersey, U.S.
- Genres: Crossover thrash, hardcore punk, alternative metal, thrash metal, punk rock
- Years active: 1986–1996; 1999–2003 (various reunions); 2009–2014; 2026–present
- Labels: Torrid, Roadrunner, Century Media, Mucky, Hammerheart
- Past members: Chris Milnes; John Milnes; Dan Nastasi; Scott Dottino; Scott LePage; Dave Neabore; Sean Kilkenny; Marc DeBacker; Chris "Junior" LaPlante; Bill Bergmann; Eric VanSteenbergh; Joe "Mama" Savino; Splatter; Terry Torino; Jack "Hinge" Pitzer; Kevin Powers; Matt DeSomma

Mucky Pup is an American hardcore and crossover thrash band formed in Bergenfield, New Jersey, in 1986, when brothers Chris (vocals) and John (drums) Milnes joined up with Scott Dottino (bass) and Dan Nastasi (guitar) as the cover band, Predator. The band soon began writing original material and changed the band name to Mucky Pup. Over the years, the band went through several lineup changes and musical style changes while gaining minor success in both the US and Europe. Their breakthrough moment occurred when they won second place in a Bloom County comic strip contest, resulting in the band performing a song featured on a flexi disc packaged with a 1987 Bloom County comic strip compilation. However, their European success, based on strong tours and charting for the 1989 A Boy in a Man's World album, surpassed all recognition achieved in their home country. The band split up in 1996 but reunited from 1999 to 2003, and again from 2009 to 2014 with a rotating lineup of both former and new members, with vocalist Chris Milnes being the only constant. In May 2026, it was announced that the A Boy in a Man's World lineup will reunite in 2027 for a new album and re-issues of their first three albums to celebrate the band's 40th anniversary.

== History ==
=== Early years ===
The band initially started as a cover band named Predator. It was not long before the band started writing original material and changed their name to Mucky Pup. They released two demo tapes in 1987. The first demo, Live and Mucky, was recorded live. After its release, bassist Scott Dottino left the band. A second demo, Greatest Hits, featuring former Hades member Scott LePage on bass, followed. Together, the two demos sold a combined amount of over 1,200 copies. That same year, the band was featured on a flexi disc in the Bloom County book, Billy and the Boingers Bootleg. This was the result of the band taking second place in a contest held for the Bloom County comic strip. The band, performing as the comic strip characters Billy and the Boingers, recorded "U-Stink-But-I-♥-U," to be featured as one of the two songs featured on the flexi disc.

=== Torrid Records ===
The band went on to play "battle of the bands" competitions in and around New Jersey. It was during one such event, while playing with the band Trixter at the Paramus, New Jersey roller rink, that a representative from Torrid Records first saw the band. The band was offered a record contract and several weeks later, they signed their first record deal with the independent label. Signing with Torrid brought a distribution deal in Europe with Roadrunner Records' sister label, Roadracer Records. The band's first album, Can't You Take a Joke?, was released in 1988.

In 1989, the band released their second album, A Boy in a Man's World. The album featured a re-recorded version of "U-Stink-But-I-♥-U", for which the band shot their first music video. MTV played the video two times. A Boy In A Man's World also featured cover art by friend and future DC and Marvel comic book artist, Nelson DeCastro, who had previously created T-shirt art for the band as well.

Before the recording of A Boy In A Man's World, LePage, who had never been considered an official member of the band, left due to touring conflicts. He was replaced by Dave Neabore. Shortly after the album was released, the band found themselves on their first tour of Europe. Although Mucky Pup never had a hit in the U.S., their European distribution deal, combined with this tour, helped the band attain success in Europe. When the band returned home, Nastasi resigned and helped co-found the band Non-Fiction with former members of Hades. Nastasi stayed with Non-Fiction for a short time before leaving to join Murphy's Law. Nastasi's position in Mucky Pup was filled by band friend Sean Kilkenny. After a year or so, Neabore and Kilkenny left to form the band that would become Dog Eat Dog and Nastasi returned to record with Mucky Pup while simultaneously joining Dog Eat Dog as well.

The band's third album, Now, was released in 1990. Now introduced new bass player Marc DeBacker, of Belgium, to the lineup and featured guest appearances by Evan Seinfeld and Billy Graziadei of the band Biohazard, whom Mucky Pup had befriended and regularly used as an opening act. In the past, various clubs had refused to let Biohazard play, thinking that their performances could lead to violence, but Mucky Pup sneaked the band on stage for a few songs before their own set. The band shot a second video, "Hippies Hate Water," which MTV never played.

The band began playing shows with bands such as Primus, Gwar, Red Hot Chili Peppers, Murphy's Law, Bad Brains, 24-7 Spyz, and Scatterbrain. While Nastasi had returned to record Now, he no longer toured with the band, as he was performing with Dog Eat Dog at the same time Mucky Pup was touring. As a result, new guitarist Splatter became the band's live guitarist. Splatter's time with band was brief and he was replaced by Terry Torino, who remained their live guitarist until 1992.

After the release of Now, Mucky Pup ended their association with Torrid and Roadrunner Records.

=== Century Media Records ===
In 1991, the band signed with Century Media Records and released Act Of Faith in the following year. Once again, the lineup shuffled with DeBacker being replaced by Christopher "Junior" LaPlante, and the addition of Kevin Powers as a keyboard player. Powers had previously played in the local New Jersey band, Articulate Violence. A video was shot for the song "Mr. Hand", which only received airplay in Europe.

Shortly after the recording of the album, Nastasi stepped down from both Mucky Pup and Dog Eat Dog. He re-joined the original lineup of Non-Fiction, now calling themselves #9. #9 was in the process of recording their debut when Nastasi accepted a solo record deal with SPV Records. Nastasi named the band Nastasee and recorded two albums, featuring collaborations with members of both Mucky Pup and Dog Eat Dog. Trim The Fat and Ule Tide were only intended for European release and as a result, the band embarked on four tours of the continent. Before Ule Tide could officially be released, Nastasee was dropped from the label and the album was never officially released outside of promotional and mail order copies. As a result, Nastasi disbanded his band.

1993 saw Mucky Pup take a turn away from humorous pop songs to focus on more aggressive, emotional and angry songs with their fifth release, Lemonade. The album brought yet another lineup change, as John Milnes moved to guitar and Kevin Powers took the drummer's position. It also saw the return of Marc DeBacker on bass. Since his previous run with Mucky Pup, DeBacker had moved on to replace Nastasi on guitar in Dog Eat Dog and had taken part in the recording of the band's second full-length album, Play Games as well as the European tour that preceded it. Once again, Mucky Pup returned to Europe, appearing frequently with Carter the Unstoppable Sex Machine with whom the band became good friends.

After releasing two albums in as many years with Century Media Records, Mucky Pup ended their association with the label.

=== Mucky Records / SPV Music ===
In 1993, the band released the album Alive & Well under their own imprint, Mucky Records, through SPV Music exclusively in Europe. The album was primarily a collection of live tracks recorded during their 1993 tour of Europe. It also contains a demo version of "The Skinheads Broke My Walkman" from the Act of Faith album, as well as cover versions of Prince's "Darling Nikki" and Sade's "Nothing Can Come Between Us". New additions to the lineup were Eric "EVS" VanSteenbergh and Glen Cummings, both on guitar. Cummings had previously been a member of both Ludichrist and Scatterbrain and toured Europe with Mucky Pup, on two occasions, as a part-time member of the band.

The band's final album, Five Guys In A Really Hot Garage, was released in Germany in 1995. The final lineup saw John Milnes return to the drums and also featured the additions of Jack "Hinge" Pitzer, formerly of New Jersey thrash metal band, The Beast, on guitar and Joe Mama on bass. DeBacker had already left the band a second time to return to Belgium and form the band 10,000 Women Man. Bass player Bill Bergmann appeared on two of the songs and was pictured on the album cover. Bergmann remained as the bass player for what was the last several months of the band's original existence.

=== Post-Mucky Pup ===
In 1998, Chris and John Milnes formed a band named Bully with Bill Bergmann and Kevin Powers. Bully was an attempt to continue recording together without the Mucky Pup name which they felt, at the time, had run its course. This lineup recorded a five-song demo consisting of the final original Mucky Pup material but no album ever materialized. The songs were retroactively made Mucky Pup songs when included on the 2012 re-release of Five Guys In A Really Hot Garage and referred to as the Straight Outta' Jersey EP.

Also in 1998, Dan Nastasi and John Milnes joined forces with former Mucky Pup and Dog Eat Dog bandmates Dave Neabore and Sean Kilkenny, to become All Boro Kings. The project was a throwback to the early days of Dog Eat Dog, as it focused on the hardcore style that Dog Eat Dog had originally displayed on their first two releases. The band quickly signed with Century Media Records who released their debut album Just For The Fun Of It in 2002. The album was released exclusively in Europe due to the strong European fan base the members had in their other bands. The band would also appear on several compilation albums. The band played most of their shows in and around New Jersey before embarking on one European tour with Biohazard, Agnostic Front, Hatebreed, Discipline, Death Threat and Born From Pain, as part of the Eastpak Resistance Tour. In 2004, All Boro Kings quietly disbanded.

In 2005, Kevin Powers co-directed the music video for the Bloodhound Gang song "Uhn Tiss Uhn Tiss Uhn Tiss", the second single from their Hefty Fine album.

In 2013 Bill Bergmann along with Dylan Gadino and Derek Gadino formed Robots and Monsters. Soon after their debut album Down to Ash was recorded, they enlisted former bandmate Kevin Powers for drumming duties. Robots and Monsters went on to release the follow-up Nothing to Fear, Nothing to Fight in 2016.

=== Reunions ===
After their breakup in 1996, Mucky Pup reunited for one night performances on several occasions, each time featuring a different incarnation or combination of previous lineups. In 1999, they reunited as an opening act for their first show ever with Dog Eat Dog. This was followed by five more one-off headlining reunion shows in 2000, 2002 and 2003.

In October 2008, the band updated their website for the first time in several years. As part of the update, the band announced that they would embark on a European mini-tour in the summer of 2009. The reunited band, consisting of Chris Milnes, John Milnes, Dan Nastasi, Dave Neabore and Kevin Powers, made a United States appearance at Mexicali Live in Teaneck, New Jersey, on April 11, 2009, performing to a sold-out crowd. In July 2009, the band performed at the Rock for People and With Full Force festivals. The band made a second trip to Europe in late August to play a handful of festival dates with bands such as Municipal Waste, Gorefest, Flotsam and Jetsam, Sodom and Martyr, before ending the tour with a string of dates with Superbutt. The European tour dates featured the lineup of Chris Milnes, Dan Nastasi, Mark DeBacker and Kevin Powers performing songs voted on, via the internet, by their fans. The band returned to Mexicali Live on December 11 to perform their final show of 2009. The show was a release party for Live At Mexicali 2009, a DVD and CD recording of the show held at the same location, the previous April. Towards the end of Mucky Pup's set, the original lineup of Dog Eat Dog reunited onstage to perform two songs.

Mucky Pup continued to perform in 2010 starting with a performance at The Saint, a nightclub located in Asbury Park, New Jersey, on January 16. On May 1, 2010, the band performed at a small benefit show held in honor of Marc DiNardo, a Jersey City Emergency Services Unit Police Officer, and longtime fan of the band, who was killed in the line of duty in July 2009. Mucky Pup made its return to Europe during the summer of 2010 for several festival and club dates. The most notable appearance of the tour was on June 27 at the Graspop Metal Meeting in Dessel, Belgium where the band appeared alongside acts such as Killswitch Engage, Amon Amarth and Kiss. The band returned for a third performance at Mexicali Live in Teaneck, New Jersey on November 24, 2010, with Murphy's Law as an opening act.

On February 27, 2011, Mucky Pup appeared as an opening act for D.R.I. at Starland Ballroom in Sayreville, New Jersey. A short tour of the Netherlands and Belgium followed in the first week of June 2011 and featured the lineup of Chris Milnes, Kevin Powers, Mark DeBacker and Sean Kilkenny. On June 24, 2011, Mucky Pup performed on the first day of the three-day East Coast Tsunami Fest in Reading, Pennsylvania where they shared the stage with several bands such as Skarhead, Murphy's Law and Leftöver Crack. The band returned to Mexicali Live on November 25, 2011, as an opening act for Assault, a band featuring John Connor of Dog Eat Dog and Nelson Decastro within its lineup.

Mucky Pup performed its first show of 2012 at The Blue Room in Secaucus, New Jersey on February 10 and featured the line up of Chris Milnes, Dave Neabore, Kevin Powers and Sean Kilkenny. The show served as a warm-up show for a tour of Europe scheduled to run from mid-February through early March and featuring the previous year's European lineup of Chris Milnes, Kevin Powers, Mark DeBacker and Sean Kilkenny. The band returned to The Blue Room on November 27, 2013, with the five-piece lineup of Chris Milnes, Dave Neabore, Dan Nastasi, Sean Kilkenny and Matt DeSomma.

On March 14, 2014, Mucky Pup performed with D.R.I. once again at the Studio at Webster Hall in New York City. Both bands performed at Mexical Live in Teaneck, New Jersey on March 15. Both nights featured the five-piece lineup of Chris Milnes, Dave Neabore, Dan Nastasi, Sean Kilkenny and John Milnes. The band ceased performing again after these two 2014 shows and their official website shut down soon after.

After more than a decade of inactivity, it was announced on May 14, 2026 that the lineup of A Boy in a Man's World had reunited, and that Mucky Pup had signed to Hammerheart Records, who will release the band's first studio album in 32 years in 2027.

== Band members ==
=== Original lineup ===
- Chris Milnes – lead vocalist (all releases and tours)
- John Milnes – drummer, guitarist (all releases and tours)
- Dan Nastasi – guitarist (Live and Mucky demo – Act of Faith)
- Scott Dottino – bassist (Live and Mucky demo)

=== Later members ===
- Scott LePage – bassist (Greatest Hits demo and Can't You Take A Joke) (not considered a full-time member)
- Dave Neabore – bassist (A Boy In A Man's World)
- Sean Kilkenny – guitarist (live during the A Boy In A Man's World tours); died 2021
- Marc DeBacker – bassist (Now and Lemonade)
- Christopher "Junior" LaPlante – bassist (Act Of Faith)
- Eric VanSteenbergh – guitarist (Alive & Well)
- Joe "Mama" Savino – bassist (Five Guys In A Really Hot Garage)
- Splatter – guitarist (live during the Now tour)
- Terry Torino – guitarist (live during the Now tour)
- Glenn Cummings – guitarist (Alive & Well) (not considered a full-time member)

=== Final lineup ===
- Chris Milnes – lead vocalist
- John Milnes – drummer
- Jack "Hinge" Pitzer – guitarist (Five Guys In A Really Hot Garage)
- Bill Bergmann – bassist (live after Five Guys In A Really Hot Garage)
- Kevin Powers – keyboardist (Act Of Faith and Five Guys In A Really Hot Garage) / drummer (Lemonade and Alive & Well)

=== Reunion lineups ===
After the band's initial 2009 reunion, the shows that followed featured a rotating lineup with Chris Milnes being the only consistent member.

- Chris Milnes – lead vocalist (all dates)
- John Milnes – drummer (all but one USA date 2009–2012, 2014 / Europe dates in 2010)
- Dan Nastasi – guitarist (all but one USA date) / (Europe dates 2009–2010)
- Kevin Powers – keyboardist (2009–2011); drummer (one USA date in 2012) / (Europe dates in 2009, 2011 & 2012)
- Marc DeBacker – bassist (all Europe dates) / (one USA date in 2011)
- Dave Neabore – bassist (all but one USA date)
- Sean Kilkenny – guitarist (Europe dates in 2011 & 2012) / (various USA dates 2012–2014); died 2021
- Matt DeSomma – drummer (Europe dates in 2012/USA dates in 2013)
- Jack "Hinge" Pitzer – live sound (2009 & 2010)

== Discography ==
=== Studio albums ===
- Can't You Take a Joke? (1988)
- A Boy in a Man's World (1989)
- Now (1990)
- Act of Faith (1992)
- Lemonade (1993)
- Five Guys in a Really Hot Garage (1995)

=== Singles ===
- "U-Stink-But-I-♥-U" (1987) (included as a flexi disc in the Bloom County book, Billy and the Boingers Bootleg (ISBN 0-316-10729-8))
- "Short Attention Span" (1996)

=== Live ===
- Alive & Well (1993) (Europe only release)
- Live At Mexicali 2009 (2009) (CD & DVD)

=== Demo tapes ===
- Live and Mucky (1987)
- Greatest Hits (1987)
