= Dan Lorenzo =

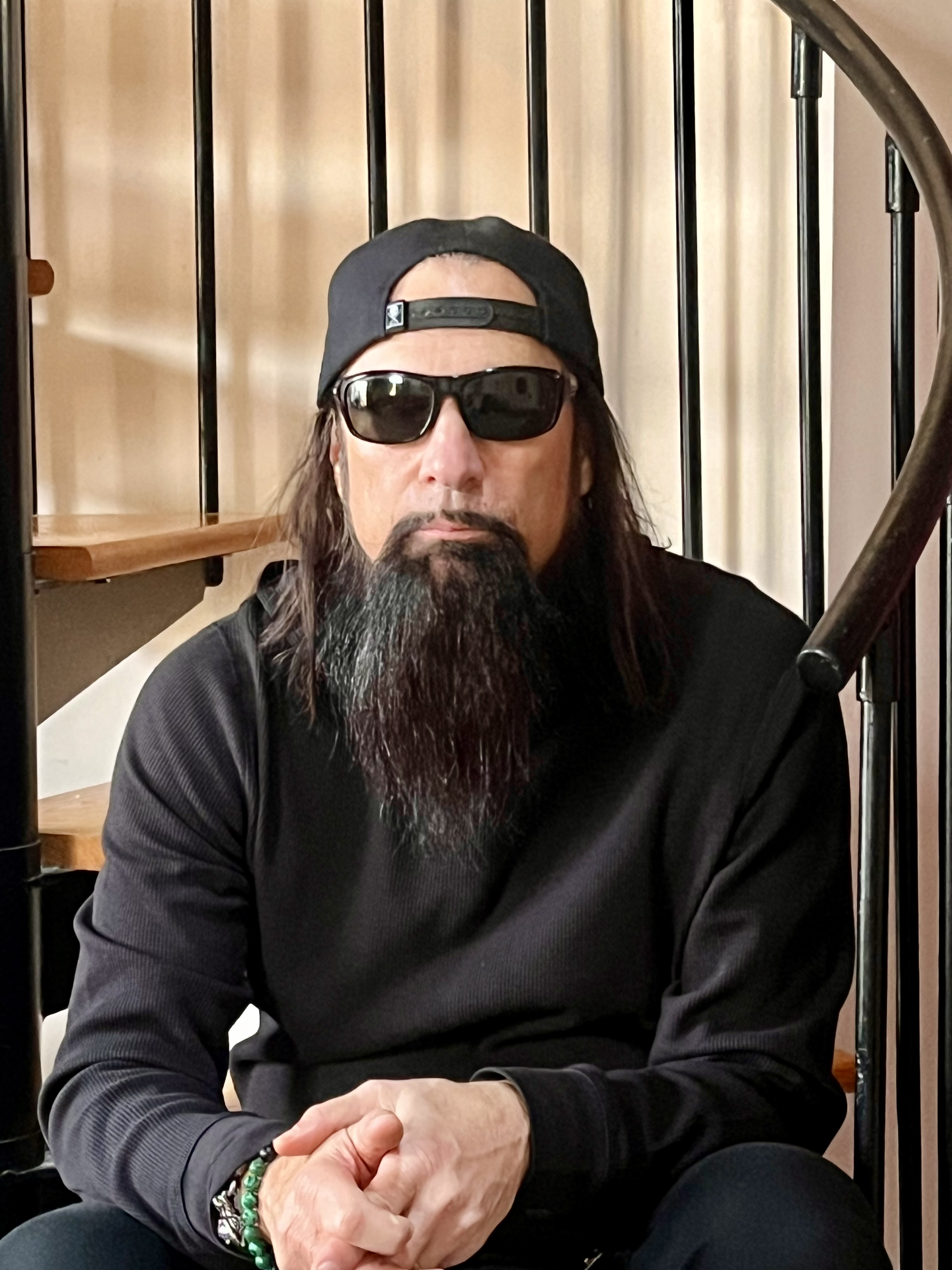
- Lorenzo in 2024

Background information
- Born: January 9, 1963 (age 63)
- Origin: Paramus, New Jersey, U.S.
- Genres: Heavy metal; thrash metal; doom metal; hard rock
- Occupation: Musician
- Instrument: Guitar
- Years active: 1978–present
- Member of: Patriarchs in Black; Vessel of Light; Cassius King
- Formerly of: Hades; Non-Fiction; The Cursed; Number 9
- Website: danlorenzo.net

Dan Lorenzo is an American guitarist and songwriter. He is best known as a founding member of the heavy metal bands Hades, Non-Fiction, The Cursed, Patriarchs in Black, Cassius King and Vessel of Light.

== Early life and education ==
Lorenzo was raised in Paramus, New Jersey, where he attended Paramus High School. Inspired by KISS, he began playing guitar and formed his first band while still in high school.

== Career ==
=== Hades ===
Lorenzo co-founded Hades in 1978 with Paul Smith. The band's early sound was influenced by artists including KISS, Cheap Trick, AC/DC, The Plasmatics, and Aerosmith. Hades began performing in Paramus, New Jersey, opening for Twisted Sister at the Soap Factory in 1982. In 1984, the band recorded two songs for Megaforce Records' compilation Born To Metalize released in 1984. In 1985, vocalist Alan Tecchio, guitarist Scott LePage, and bassist Jimmy Schulman joined the band. Together with Lorenzo and drummer Tom Coombs, they self-released the single The Cross/Widow's Mite in 1986. Later in 1986, Hades signed with Torrid Records. The band released its debut album, Resisting Success, in 1987. This was followed by If at First You Don't Succeed in 1988. The band disbanded following its European headlining tour in 1989.

Hades released the full-length album Exist to Resist in 1995, consisting primarily of songs written before the band's 1989 breakup.

Hades reunited in the late 1990s and signed with Metal Blade Records. The band released $avior$elf (1999), The Downside (2000), and DamNation (2001). After touring throughout the East Coast, Hades disbanded again.

=== Non-Fiction ===
Lorenzo formed Non-Fiction with Dan Nastasi of Mucky Pup and Dog Eat Dog. The band released an EP on Arena Records in 1990. Arena Records was owned by Glen Evans from Nuclear Assault. Vocalist Alan Tecchio subsequently rejoined Lorenzo, and Non-Fiction released its debut album, Preface, on Grand Slamm Records in 1991, followed by In The Know in 1992. In 1993, the band toured Europe with Overkill on the "World of Hurt Tour."

Non-Fiction released its third and final studio album, It's A Wonderful Lie..., on Steamhammer Records in 1996.

=== The Cursed ===
Lorenzo formed The Cursed with Bobby Elsworth of Overkill. The band released its only album, Room Full of Sinners, on Screaming Ferret Wreckords in 2007.

Later that year, Lorenzo launched the weekly internet radio show F-Bombs for Everyone on Bionic Strigl Radio/Live365. The program ran for approximately six months before ending.

=== Vessel of Light ===
In 2017, Lorenzo formed Vessel of Light with vocalist Nathan Opposition (Ancient Wisdom), bassist Jimmy Schulman (Hades; formerly Attacker), and drummer Ron Lipnicki (Hades; formerly Overkill). The band released its self-titled EP later that year, followed by its debut full-length album, Woodshed, in 2018. Both releases were issued by Argonauta Records.

The band's second album, Thy Serpent Rise, was released in 2019, followed by Last Ride in 2020. Both albums were released by Nomad Eel Records.

=== Patriarchs in Black ===
Lorenzo formed Patriarchs in Black with drummer Johnny Kelly of Type O Negative and Quiet Riot. The band's debut album, Reach for the Scars, was released by MDD Records in 2022. It featured numerous guest vocalists and bassists, including Karl Agell, Dewey Bragg, and Jimmy Gnecco.

The band's second album, My Veneration, followed in 2023 and included guest performances by Darryl McDaniels, Mark Sunshine of Riot God and Unida, Rob Traynor, and bassist Dave Neabore of Dog Eat Dog.

Patriarchs in Black released its third studio album, Visioning, through Metalville Records in 2024. Guest vocalists included Kyle Thomas of Exhorder and Jason McMaster of Dangerous Toys and Watchtower. Later that year, Brutal Planet Records released the EP Covered in Black, featuring cover versions performed by the band.

The band's fourth studio album, Home, was released by Metalville Records on August 15, 2025. In February 2026, NoLifeTilMetal Records released the vinyl covers EP Completely Covered in Black, which included a guest performance by Rob Dukes.

In September 2026, Patriarchs in Black announced plans to release a new studio album, To Serve Man, through Metalville Records on January 8, 2027, preceded by the single "No More Blood" on October 1, 2026.

=== DMC collaboration ===
In 2024, Lorenzo co-wrote and recorded two songs with Darryl McDaniels, "terRIFFic!" and "Game Changer."

=== Solo ===
Lorenzo released a solo thrash song "Silver Lined Cyanide Serenity" in August 2026.
