= Nastasee =

American hardcore punk band

- Origin: Bergen County, New Jersey, U.S.
- Genres: Hardcore punk
- Years active: 1996–1998
- Label: SPV
- Past members: Dan Nastasi; John Milnes; Mike Heinzer; Sean Kilkenny

Nastasee was an American hardcore band formed in Bergen County, New Jersey by former Mucky Pup, Dog Eat Dog, and Murphy's Law guitar player, Dan Nastasi. Nastasee recorded two albums featuring collaborations with members of Mucky Pup, Dog Eat Dog, Non-Fiction, Hades and Murphy's Law.

== History ==
=== Origins ===
Dan Nastasi was a founding member and guitarist of Mucky Pup, a Bergenfield, New Jersey hardcore and crossover thrash band formed in 1985. After three years and two albums with the band, Nastasi parted ways with Mucky Pup and spent a brief time as vocalist for the band Non-Fiction. After recording one EP, Nastasi left to fill the guitarist position in Murphy's Law. Nastasi's time in Murphy's Law was brief and Nastasi returned to Mucky Pup to record their third album, Now. Nastasi also joined with former Mucky Pup members, Dave Neabore and Sean Kilkenny, to form Dog Eat Dog with whom he would record the Warrant EP and the All Boro Kings album. Nastasi recorded one more album, Act of Faith, with Mucky Pup before stepping down from both Mucky Pup and Dog Eat Dog to focus on running his own business.

=== Trim the Fat ===
Nastasi soon reunited with the original Non-Fiction lineup to form the band named #9. #9 was in the process of recording their debut when Nastasi accepted a solo record deal with SPV Records. Nastasi named the band Nastasee and began recording his first album, Trim the Fat. One song on the album, titled "Two Pops," was co-written by Dan Lorenzo, his former #9 bandmate, and was originally intended for use on the #9 album. In 1996, the album was released exclusively in Europe due to the popularity of his previous bands in the continent. Four European tours followed in support of the album.

=== Ule Tide ===
Due to the favorable response that the album received, the label had Nastasee begin work on the followup immediately. In 1998, SPV Records were set to release the second Nastasee album, Ule Tide. While on another European tour with the band Shelter, to support the upcoming Ule Tide album, Nastasi was informed by the label that due to cost cutting and their signing of Motörhead, SPV Records would be dropping Nastasee and not releasing the Ule Tide album . As a result, Dan Nastasi decided to end the band. Ule Tide was made available through mailorders and promotional copies only. Those copies continue to be circulated through websites such as eBay and Amazon.com.

=== Nastasi's return to Mucky Pup and Dog Eat Dog ===
Soon after the breakup of the band, Nastasi joined with former Mucky Pup and Dog Eat Dog bandmates, John Milnes, Dave Neabore & Sean Kilkenny, to become All Boro Kings. All Boro Kings released one album, Just for the Fun of It, in Europe. The band played most of their shows in and around New Jersey before embarking on one European tour with Biohazard, Agnostic Front, Hatebreed, Discipline, Death Threat and Born From Pain, as part of the EastPak sponsored Resistance Tour. Six years later, the All Boro Kings project also ended. In 2009, Nastasi reunited with Mucky Pup who continue to play shows in the United States and Europe. In 2010, Nastasi and the original lineup of Dog Eat Dog reunited for two shows to commemorate the band's twentieth anniversary. In January 2011, Nastasi performed three European shows with Dog Eat Dog to fill in for current guitarist, Roger Haemmerli, who was working with his band Henchman at the time.

== Albums ==
- Trim The Fat (1996)
- Ule Tide (1998)
