= Stone Deep =

American rap-rock group

Stone Deep is an American rock band from Nashville, Tennessee. The group formed in 1992 following the major label run of its predecessor, The Hard Corps, and reunited in 2022.

The band plays rap rock, rap metal, and hard rock - each as a different amalgam of Southern rap and guitar-driven rock ‘n’ roll and with a lyrical focus on social issues.

The band navigated several lineup changes through the 1990s and then, after a 23-year hiatus began performing and releasing music again in 2022. The current lineup consists of founding members Ronzo "The Beast" Cartwright, Glen Cummings, and DJ KUTT/Terry Hayes together with the longest serving rhythm section: bassist Tim Books and drummer David Howard.

== Band History ==
=== The Hard Corps ===
Stone Deep was preceded by The Hard Corps (THC), a multi-racial rap-rock band from Nashville's ‘90s alternative scene.

THC teamed rappers Cartwright and Bob “Deputy Dirty Bob” Samuels and DJ Terry “Major Kutt” Hayes with rock musicians Kelly “Machine Gun Kelly” Butler (bass), Kenny “Maestro K.O.” Owens (drums), and Kevin “Rev-Kev” Reinen (guitar).

Butler came from Mr. Zero, a Nashville rap punk band. Cartwright and Samuels were in a separate Nashville-based rap group, The Vice, while Hayes was a local DJ. They became friends while working together at the same audio company. Cartwright told The Scene (Nashville) that the group initially struggled to find common ground between rap and metal but found it in "beats with more pocket... a fat, tight, chunky beat”.

The group signed in 1991 with Interscope Records after an attention-garnering performance at a Nashville Music Association function. In the December 1991 issue of Music Row, Brian Mansfield speculated that it was "the biggest pop deal ever for a Nashville band (a reported $2 million plus for two albums)."

THC's debut album Def Before Dishonor was issued in Sept. 1991 and co-produced by Jam Master Jay of Run DMC and Grammy award-winner Phil Nicolo. The video for debut single “Hard Corps” made MTV history as the first added to both the Yo! MTV Raps and Headbangers Ball playlists.

The Tennessean's Robert K. Oermann interpreted The Hard Corps' military stage gear as representing “the battlefield against prejudice and misunderstanding” which placed them on “the frontline of a new musical style." "We're about doing the right thing and we have something to say," Butler told Oermann. “We address certain issues and we cross certain barriers, including race, but that's not our main focus. Just by being who we are and doing what we do is a message in itself."

THC toured with Primus, Fishbone, 24-7 Spyz, and Ice T & Body Count. Billboard praised the band's ability to "rap and scratch out a fearsome metal hip-hop fusion."

In 1992, four of the six THC members – Cartwright, Hayes, Butler, and Owens – enlisted Cummings to play a handful of outstanding dates around the region. Cummings had spent the previous decades writing, recording, and touring with his hardcore punk and thrash metal bands Ludichrist and Scatterbrain. The provisional line-up immediately geled, and they renamed themselves Stone Deep.

The rechristened group began wearing matching Dickies workwear because four members were co-workers at a tire distribution warehouse and would come directly to rehearsal from their job. The other band members took to wearing the same clothes so everyone would match, and that onstage look remains consistent today.

=== The First Two EPs, 1992-1993 ===
Within three months of forming, Stone Deep recorded its first EP, Nashville. Half of the songs were developed from songs THC never recorded, while the other half were completely new. Because of the quick turnaround between band names, some positive coverage of the EP —such as a Scene (Nashville) review by Kath Hansen which praised the songs for being "raw and down to business"— incorrectly called the band THC.

The band recorded its Gangs and The Govt EP in 1993. The four brand-new tracks were co-written by Cartwright, Butler, and Cummings. While the title track netted comparisons to Rage Against the Machine and other rap-rock peers, "Mr. Sunray's" lighter tone and positive message got likened to the works of De La Soul and Arrested Development. A Punk Planet review of the EP declared that "there's no reason this shouldn't be on MTV right now."

THC's reputation in Nashville positioned Stone Deep to perform locally not just at Lucy's Record Shop and other DIY venues. The self-managed group also appeared at the Nashville Entertainment Association's (NEA) Extravaganza ‘94, which featured such regional talents as country songwriter and four-time Grammy nominee Darrell Scott.

=== Kung Fu Grip and the NARAS Foundation's National Grammy Showcase, 1996 ===
The group's first full-length album, 1996's Kung Fu Grip introduced a rougher, darker tone that reflected Stone Deep's transition from co-founder Butler to new bassist Sam Tucker. Butler stepped away from playing in bands to become a luthier and currently owns K. Butler Guitars in Nashville. In addition, Howard joined for the first time as drummer, bringing his hard rock experience via Nashville prog rock band and former MCA Records signees Paradise Lost. USA Today praised album's “tough-minded songs about the urban edge.”

That same year, Stone Deep won Best Independent Artist at the Nashville Entertainment Awards, edging out Nashville rocker Tim Carroll and others. Stone Deep was the first non-country act to win the honor. Kung Fu Grip won Best Indie Album, with country singer-songwriter Buddy Miller's Your Love and Other Lies among the nominees. The event was hosted at the Ryman Auditorium, with such country notables as Martina McBride, Alison Krauss, and Vince Gill among the night's winners.

That same year, Stone Deep took part in a national battle of the bands competition sponsored by the National Academy of Recording Arts and Sciences (NARAS) called The Grammy Showcase. Performances in Nashville and New York earned the group a spot in the final four. The competition began with 3,500 demos from different acts. Stone Deep ultimately won first place and was honored at a ceremony during the Grammy Awards. The band turned down the demo deal it earned from Atlantic Records by reaching the final four and passed on interest by Epic Records.

=== The End of the Band's Original Run, 1997- 2000 ===
A second full-length album, One followed in 1997. This time, the group worked at Nashville's historic Woodland Studios with Bruce Calder, a producer with credits on releases by Mother Love Bone, Green River and Swans. It's from the first recording sessions with Brooks, whose reggae background with Nashville's Freedom of Expression further evolved the group's sound.

Stone Deep's original-run discography ended with Engage, a 2000 CD compiling new and unreleased tracks. Its cover shows a photo of Brooks’ back tattoo, which reads “ENGAGE.” By then, David “Drummy Dave” DePriest, Brooks’ former bandmate in Freedom of Expression, had joined as the group's drummer. Billboard praised later Stone Deep recordings for their blend of "intelligent rapping with electric guitar and throbbing bass."

The band went on hiatus in 2000.

=== Reformation and Reissues ===
Stone Deep reformed with its current lineup in Oct. 2022. As of March 2024, Nashville, Gangs and The Govt, and Kung Fu Grip have been remastered, repackaged, and re-released. The group has used not just digital streaming but also its social media presence to reconnect with longtime fans and be discovered by new ones. There are plans to reissue the remainder of the band's discography, including the live album Live at Ellston Place.

After performing one secret concert for Lucy Record Store's 30th anniversary, Stone Deep performed their first advertised set in 24 years on July 25, 2023 at Drkmttr, a DIY space in Nashville. As of March 2025, a 25-song double album titled Peace and War is in pre-production.

== Personnel ==
=== Current members ===
- Ronzo Cartwright- vocals (1992–present)
- Glen Cummings- guitar (1992–present)
- Terry Hayes- vocals, DJ (1992–94, 2022–present)
- David Howard- drums (1994–98, 2022–present)
- Tim Brooks- bass (1995–99, 2022–present)

=== Former members ===
- Kelly Butler- bass (1992–94)
- Kenny Owens- drums (1992–93)
- Ruben Makepiece Garzas- drums (1993–94)
- Sam Tucker- bass (1994–95)
- Dave DePriest- drums (1998–99)

== Discography ==
- 1992 - Nashville EP (Secession Recordings, reissued in 2022 by Odis)
- 1993 - Gangs and The Govt EP (Secession Recordings, reissued in 2023 by Odis)
- 1996 - Kung Fu Grip (Secession Recordings)
- 1997 - One (Secession Recordings)
- 2000 - Engage (Irregular Records)
- 2022 - Nashville EP Reissue (Odis)
- 2023 - Gangs and The GovtEP Reissue (Odis)
