= Can't You Take a Joke? =

Studio album by Mucky Pup
- Released: 1988
- Recorded: Fox Studios
- Genre: Thrash metal, crossover thrash
- Label: Torrid Records
- Producer: Chris Milnes & Scott LePage

Mucky Pup chronology
Can't You Take a Joke? (1988)	A Boy in a Man's World (1989)

Can't You Take a Joke? is the first studio album by Mucky Pup. The album was recorded at Fox Studios in Rutherford, New Jersey and released in 1988 through Torrid Records and Roadrunner Records.

== Track listing ==
1. "Knock Knock" - 0:59
2. "Nazichizm" - 2:24
3. "Caddy Killer" - 0:47
4. "M.B. (Ballad of the Morron Bros.)" - 2:47
5. "Innocent's" - 2:29
6. "Daddy's Boy (Theme Song)" - 1:01
7. "F.U.C.K." - 1:19
8. "U-R Nothing" - 1:00
9. "A.I.D.S." - 2:48
10. "Life 4 Def" - 1:54
11. "Laughing in Your Face" - 2:10
12. "Woody" - 1:48
13. "Bushpigs" - 1:38
14. "Mr. Prezident" - 2:01
15. "I.R.S." - 1:08
16. "Shmbluh" - 1:49

== Credits ==
- Chris Milnes - lead vocalist
- John Milnes - drummer
- Dan Nastasi - guitarist
- Scott LePage - bassist

Production

- Design – Deborah Lauren
- Engineer – Bill (The Catt) Klatt
- Executive-Producer – Ken Adams, Todd Gordon
- Lyrics By – Mucky Pup
- Music By – Mucky Pup
- Photography By – Brian Downing, Brian Newman, Chris Milnes, Mark Hart
- Photography By (Front Cover) – Brian Downing
- Producer – C. Milnes, S. LePage
