= Who's the King? =

"Who's the King"

Single by Dog Eat Dog

from the album All Boro Kings
- Released: 1995
- Genre: Rap metal; hardcore punk
- Length: 3:55 (album version); 3:34 (single version)
- Label: Roadrunner
- Producer: Jason Corsaro

"Who's the King?" is a song by the American band Dog Eat Dog. It was released as a single in 1995 by Roadrunner Records. Darryl Jenifer, from the hardcore punk band Bad Brains, makes a vocal appearance in the song.

== Commercial performance ==
The song and its music video were successful in Europe. The music video was featured in rotation on MTV Europe, and the song peaked at no. 34 in Sweden.

== Track listing ==
No.	Title	Length
1.	"Who's the King?" (Slight Remix)	3:34
2.	"Pull My Finger" (Live)	3:31
3.	"Think" (Live)	3:36
4.	"Dog Eat Dog" (Live)	5:13
Total length:		15:54

== Chart performance ==
Chart (1995)	Peak position
Sweden (Sverigetopplistan)	34
UK Rock & Metal (OCC)	10

Chart (1996)	Peak position
UK Rock & Metal (OCC)	38
