= Glen Cummings (musician) =

American thrash metal guitarist

- Born: Bethpage, New York, U.S.
- Genres: thrash metal; hardcore punk; speedcore; nyhc; rap rock
- Occupations: guitarist; producer; songwriter; designer
- Instrument: guitar
- Years active: 1983–1999, 2022-present
- Labels: Combat Core; Combat; In Effect Records; Elektra

Glen Cummings is an American thrash metal guitarist best known for his work in Ludichrist, Scatterbrain, and Stone Deep.

== Horror Planet ==
In 1984 Glen joined New York psychedelic-punk ensemble Horror Planet. The group featured Paul Quigley (Party Frank), vocals, congas and maracas; Rick Bruccoleri (Hambone Legbone), bass and kazoo; Dave (Funk Ma Da Goonk El Paso Fungalscreen Xtra-Cheese Eggs on a Platter), Drums; Tony Arena (Weasle Worm Crumb Boy) backing vocals, tenor kazoo, and tambourine; and Glen Cummings (Swami Swami Swami), guitar. The group's influences varied from early psychedelic/acid rock, to bubblegum pop, to novelty albums, to proto-punk acts like The Cramps.

Horror Planet created two releases: "Otis The Frogman", a collection of songs and outtakes on a hand-painted cassette tape and "Cow Pies from Outer Space", a six-song E.P. on a clear vinyl record with hand-painted covers.

Mike Bullshit of Bullshit Monthly wrote: "I can't describe this record. Every song on the E.P. has something special about it... Bits of hardcore, psychedelia, punk and kazoo mixed in together to achieve god-like potential. They are a complete venture into the completely improbable where anything can happen, and it does..."

Tim Yohannan of Maximum Rocknroll wrote "Expand your Mind and Shorten your Life" "is one of the six songs, and that typifies the 'zany' outlook expressed by this combo. Musically they play a grungy, noisy, but tight garage metal-tinged thrash. Unique."

== Ludichrist ==
Ludichrist was an early hardcore thrash band from Long Island, NY which released two albums: Immaculate Deception (1986) and Powertrip (1988).

=== Demos ===
After multiple rehearsals and performances, Ludichrist recorded its second effort (and first since Cummings joined): "Ludichrist– The Demo" featuring new arrangements of the songs featured on the previous demo plus the new songs "Games Once Played" and "Young, White and Well Behaved".

In the October 1985 Maximum Rocknroll contributing writer Pushead (a.k.a. Brian Schroeder) wrote: "Wild, chaotic, intense and full of different variations, Ludichrist charge outward with a superb sonic flailing."

=== Immaculate Deception and Powertrip ===
Ludichrist's 1986 release Immaculate Deception features Cummings paired with guitarist Joe Butcher and was recorded at Platinum Island Sounds in Manhattan with Randy Burns producing.

The album featured 19 tracks, 12 of them rearranged versions which had appeared on other releases, and seven of them appearing for the first time. Fresh material included "Fire at The Firehouse," which begins with a riff inspired by Black Sabbath's "Fairies Wear Boots" and tells a moral fable of a racist who magically wakes up with the tables turned; "Games Once Played," which features a guitar and bass duet written by Chuck Valle and the first of Tommy Christ's poetic lyrics; and "Green Eggs and Ham," a song with lyrics cribbed directly from Dr. Seuss's Green Eggs and Ham, and music lifted wholesale from Rapid Deployment's "No Edge". The latter also featured a rap section written by the group's unofficial sixth member Jeff Hubner (a.k.a. LL. Cool Jeff) but performed on the album by bassist Valle. In addition, "You Can't Have Fun" is a lyrical tribute to Glen's mother who at some point had scolded Tommy saying "life was not meant to be fun." The track features guest performances by Roger Miret of Agnostic Front, John Connelly of Nuclear Assault, Eddie Sutton of Leeway, and Chris Notaro of the Crumbsuckers. "Legal Murder" is a pisstake which alternates between melodic swing and DRI-esque thrash, "Thinking of You" was penned by Joe Butcher and inspired by doom rockers Trouble's post-Sabbath heaviness; and finally, "Last Train to Clarksville" is a thrashy but earnest cover of Boyce and Hart's pop hit written for the made-for -TV-band The Monkees.

People magazine said "Though the ferocious guitar riffs on Immaculate Deception start to sound strangely appealing after a few listens, this record isn't for everybody"

By the time their second album, the more metal-influenced Powertrip, was released, only two original members, Cummings and singer Tommy Christ, remained.

Before the release of Ludichrist' third album Here Comes Trouble on In Effect Records, the group renamed itself Scatterbrain to circumvent a boycott by conservative Christian record distributors.

In a Nov. 2024 interview with Blasted By Britton, Cummings shared that a three-song demo for Powertrip, known as both The Basement Demos and And We Mean That, will be issued in the future by F.O.A.D. Records.

== Scatterbrain ==
Scatterbrain was an American funk metal band with ironic lyrics.

=== Here Comes Trouble and Scamboogery ===
The group's debut album was heralded in the music press as an eclectic amalgam of musical styles, for the group's tight musicianship and production, and for the humorous lyrics.

Music critic Mike Gitter wrote: “...the musical brilliance Scatterbrain yield, neath girded loins, sets them light years apart from the competition. Ask guitar god Joe Satriani, who reportedly swore up and down that the Neider/Cummings tag team churned forth some of the finest finger work he's heard in a dog's age."

In a feature in Faces magazine's October 1990 issue, staff writer Lee Sherman wrote: "Scatterbrain's musical eclecticism is more than merely gratuitous buffoonery… they have the musical know-how to pull it off." and "Scatterbrain isn't the first band to make screwball behavior an indispensable part of its persona, but they may be the first one where the playing is the only thing that isn't a joke".

Second album Scamboogery was issued in 1991 by major label Elektra.

=== Unreleased Album ===
In a Nov. 2024 interview with Blasted By Britton, Cummings revealed that there's a third, unreleased Scatterbrain album titled Hot Garbage that was recorded for --and rejected by-- Elektra Records.

=== Music videos ===
Filmmaker George Seminara created two music videos for the group which portrayed songs as short stories. In "Don't Call Me Dude," a jilted lover goes berserk when he's called "dude." In "Down with The Ship," a band sneaks in and auditions to appear in their own music video after being shunned by a record company.

Host of MTV's Headbangers Ball, Riki Rachtman can be credited for single-handedly popularizing the group on MTV. On his June 16, 1990 birthday episode, Rachtman held a live interview with the band and on February 8, 1992, he hosted Headbangers Ball live from a Scatterbrain concert at The Scrap Bar. In interviews Rachtman still lists "Don't Call Me Dude" at number five on his ideal playlist. On March 8, 1993 the first season of Mike Judge's Beavis and Butt-Head featured "Don't Call Me Dude" in episode 2: "Blood Drive" on MTV.

=== Australia ===
"Don't Call Me Dude" spent 15 weeks on Australia's national ARIA Charts (Australian Recording Industry Association), peaking at #14 for three non-consecutive weeks in January and February 1991.

Music journalist Ian McFarland explains that "its not hard to figure out how a cult metal outfit from the U.S. can become stars virtually overnight here in Australia [...] the likes of ABC TV's late night video show Rage and JJJ FM regularly aired the track last year, which set a groundswell in motion that led to more commercial FM stations like MMM adding it to their playlists."

Scatterbrain performed a month-long series of dates in Australia promoted by TripleJ and Virgin Australia. To promote the tour a video for "Sonata #9" was produced in which an Alistair Cook-like TV host cries after mistakenly presenting the group's take on Mozart's "Sonata 3".

== Stone Deep ==
In 1992, Cummings provided lead guitar on two tracks on, as well as co-produced, Mucky Pup's fifth studio album Lemonade which was released in 1993. Cummings then toured Europe with the band twice as a part-time member. Some of these performances can be heard on Mucky Pup's 1994 live album Alive & Well.

Circa 1992, Cummings relocated to Nashville, Tennessee where he founded the rap rock act Stone Deep together with Ronzo Cartwright (vocals), Terry Hayes (vocals and turntable), Kelly Butler (Bass), and Kenny Owens (Drums). Cartwright, Hayes, Butler, and Owens were previously members of The Hard Corps whose lone album Def Before Dishonor (Atlantic Records, 1991) was co-produced by Run-DMC's Jam Master Jay and Joe "the Butcher" Nicolo. The Hard Corps was the opening act for Ice-T and Body Count on their 1992 "Cop Killer Tour".

Stone Deep recorded and released two EPs ("Stone Deep" cassette, 1993; "Gangs and The Government/Mr. Sunray" single, 1995) and four albums (Kung Fu Grip cassette, 1996; Stone Deep CD, 1997; Hump n Hum CD, 1999; Engage CD, 2000). Since reforming in 2022 after a 23-year hiatus, the band has begun remastering and reissuing its catalog. As of 2025, the two EPs and Kung Fu Grip have been reissued. One, Engage and Live at Ellston Place are expected to arrive in 2025 or 2026. In addition, a 25-song double album titled Peace and War is in pre-production.

Stone Deep was featured or profiled in NY Daily News, USA Today, The Tennessean, The Nashville Banner, the Nashville Scene, Music Row, and Ripple.

Stone Deep was lauded in 1996 with its second Nashville Music Award for "Best Independent Act" and voted Best Unsigned Act in the United States by the NARAS (The National Academy of Recording Arts and Sciences)/The National Grammy Award Showcase.

After performing one secret concert for Lucy Record Store's 30th anniversary, Stone Deep performed their first advertised set in 24 years on July 25, 2023 at Drkmttr, a DIY space in Nashville.
