= Here Comes Trouble (Scatterbrain album) =

Studio album by Scatterbrain
- Released: 1990
- Genres: Funk metal, thrash metal
- Length: 37:05
- Label: Relativity

Scatterbrain chronology
| Here Comes Trouble (1990) | Scamboogery (1991) |

Singles from Here Comes Trouble
- 1. "Don't Call Me Dude" Released: 1990; 2. "Down with the Ship (Slight Return)" Released: 1991

Here Comes Trouble is the first album by American funk metal band Scatterbrain, released in 1990. It spent 16 weeks on Billboard's album charts, peaking at number 138.

The album contains a cover version of Cheech and Chong's "Earache My Eye". The single "Don't Call Me Dude" makes reference to vaudeville routine "Slowly I Turned" and comedian Bill Saluga's "Johnson" character; the intro is a parody of Dion's "Runaround Sue". The follow-up single "Down with the Ship (Slight Return)" features snippets from a number of classic rock and heavy metal songs, as detailed below.

== Reception ==
Professional ratings
Review scores
| Source | Rating |
|---|---|
| AllMusic | link |

The album's initial reception was generally positive, with reviews noting the quality of the band's vocals and humorous approach to heavy metal. The album proved memorable enough for some music writers that it enjoyed continuing retrospective coverage into the 2000s. Later reviews reflect on the album's quirky and sometimes scattered themes, as well as the quality musicianship. Others believe the album demonstrates that the band should hold a more important place in the history of the genre, in spite of the fact that later offerings failed to reach the level of success enjoyed by Here Comes Trouble.

== Track listing ==
1. "Here Comes Trouble" — 3:54
2. "Earache My Eye" — 2:47
3. "That's That" — 3:57
4. "I'm with Stupid" — 5:05
5. "Down with the Ship (Slight Return)" — 2:29
6. "Sonata #3" — 1:54
7. "Mr. Johnson and the Juice Crew" — 1:55
8. "Goodbye Freedom, Hello Mom" — 4:49
9. "Outta Time" — 3:36
10. "Don't Call Me Dude" — 5:14
11. "Drunken Milkman" — 1:19

== Personnel ==
- Tommy Christ – lead vocals
- Glen Cummings – guitars, backing vocals
- Paul Nieder – guitars, backing vocals
- Guy Brogna – bass, backing vocals
- Mike Boyko – drums, backing vocals

=== Additional musicians ===
- John Connelly – lead vocals on 8 tracks
- Tom Soares – backing vocals

== Song snippets in "Down with the Ship" ==
- Voodoo Child (Slight Return) – Jimi Hendrix
- Rock and Roll – Led Zeppelin
- Dazed and Confused – Led Zeppelin
- Seek And Destroy – Metallica
- La Grange (drum fill) – ZZ Top
- Lonely Is the Night – Billy Squier
- The Ocean – Led Zeppelin
- Walk This Way – Aerosmith
- Heartbreaker- Led Zeppelin
- In the Air Tonight (drum fill) – Phil Collins
- Roundabout – Yes
- Roadhouse Blues – The Doors
- Ain't Talkin' 'bout Love – Van Halen
- Where Eagles Dare (drum intro) – Iron Maiden
- The Star-Spangled Banner
- The Woody Woodpecker Song

== Charts ==
Chart performance for Here Comes Trouble
| Chart (1990) | Peak position |
|---|---|
| Australian Albums (ARIA) | 54 |
| US Billboard 200 | 138 |
