= No Fronts =

Single by Dog Eat Dog

from the album All Boro Kings
- Released: 1994
- Genre: Rapcore; rap metal
- Length: 4:36
- Label: Roadrunner
- Producer: Jason Corsaro

Professional ratings
Review scores
| Source | Rating |
|---|---|
| Music Week | 3/5 stars |

"No Fronts" is a song by American band Dog Eat Dog from their debut studio album All Boro Kings. It was released as a single in 1994 by Roadrunner Records. The music video for the song was shot at the Pipeline in Newark, New Jersey and was in rotation on TV. The other two versions of the song were remixed by the Beatnuts.

== Commercial performance ==
The song, especially the Jam Master Jay's version, became really popular in Europe. In 1995, the song peaked at top no. 45, 20 and 64 in Germany, Netherlands and UK respectfully. It also peaked at no. 3 in UK Rock and Metal charts. In 1996, the song re-entered the UK charts, peaking at no. 9, as well as peaking at no. 1 in UK Rock and Metal chart and stayed on that position for 3 weeks.

== In pop culture ==
In December 1994, the song's music video was featured in an episode of Beavis and Butt-Head, where the animated duo called the band "a bunch of butt-munches".

"No Fronts: The Remixes"

Single by Dog Eat Dog
- Released: 1995
- Genre: rap rock
- Length: 15:59
- Label: Roadrunner

== No Fronts: The Remixes ==
No Fronts: The Remixes is an EP released in 1994 by Roadrunner Records. The single features the Jam Master Jay remix of No Fronts. The music video for the remix was successful, getting heavy rotation on MTV Europe .

=== Track listing ===
| No. | Title | Length |
|---|---|---|
| 1. | "No Fronts" (LP version) | 4:36 |
| 2. | "No Fronts" (Not Pearl Jam mix) | 4:30 |
| 3. | "No Fronts" (Psycho Les Pas) | 4:05 |
| Total length: | | 13:11 |

No Fronts: The Remixes
| No. | Title | Length |
|---|---|---|
| 1. | "No Fronts" (Jam Master Jay's Main Edit) | 3:45 |
| 2. | "No Fronts" (Clean Greene Version) | 4:05 |
| 3. | "No Fronts" (Psycho Les Pass) | 4:05 |
| 4. | "No Fronts" (Jam Master Jay's TV) | 4:04 |
| Total length: | | 15:59 |

== Charts ==
| Chart (1995) | Peak position |
|---|---|
| German Singles (Offizielle Top 100) | 45 |
| Dutch Singles (Single Top 100) | 20 |
| UK Singles (OCC) | 64 |
| UK Rock & Metal (OCC) | 3 |

| Chart (1996) | Peak position |
|---|---|
| UK Singles (OCC) | 9 |
| UK Rock & Metal (OCC) | 1 |
