= Now (Mucky Pup album) =

Studio album by Mucky Pup
- Released: 1990
- Recorded: 1990
- Genre: Hardcore punk
- Label: Roadracer
- Producer: Chris Andersen, Mucky Pup

Mucky Pup chronology
A Boy in a Man's World (1989)	Now (1990)	Act of Faith (1992)

Professional ratings
Review scores
Source	Rating
The Encyclopedia of Popular Music	2/5 stars

Now is the third album by the American band Mucky Pup, released in 1990. The band supported the album with a North American tour.

== Track listing ==
1. Hippies Hate Water 3:21
2. Three Dead Gophers 3:06
3. Jimmies 3:48
4. Baby 2:21
5. She Quieffed 0:42
6. Feeling Sick 1:52
7. A Headbanger's Balls & 120 Minutes 1:38
8. My Hands, Your Neck 3:18
9. Face 2:29
10. Hotel Penitentiary 3:04
11. Mucky Pumpin' Beat 3:10
12. I Know Nobody 2:35
13. Walkin with the Devil 1:46
14. Yesterdays 2:33
15. To Be Lonely 4:21
