= All Boro Kings =

Studio album by Dog Eat Dog
- Released: May 24, 1994
- Studios: Ambient Recording Co., Stamford CT
- Genres: Hardcore punk; rap metal; rap rock
- Length: 35:20
- Label: Roadrunner
- Producer: Jason Corsaro

Dog Eat Dog chronology
| Warrant (1993) | All Boro Kings (1994) | Play Games (1996) |

Singles from All Boro Kings
- 1. "No Fronts" Released: 1994; 2. "If These Are Good Times/No Fronts" Released: 1994; 3. "Who's The King?" Released: 1995

All Boro Kings is the first studio album by American rock band Dog Eat Dog, released on May 24, 1994, by Roadrunner Records. The album was a solid success, selling over 400,000 copies by the end of 1995. The album was a big hit in Europe, charting in countries like: Germany, United Kingdom and the Netherlands. The album got certified gold in the Netherlands in 2000. The music videos for songs "Who's the King?" and "No Fronts" were in heavy rotation on MTV Europe which proved to be the key factor in the album's success. So far, the album has sold 600,000 copies worldwide. Darryl Jenifer of the Bad Brains made a vocal appearance on "Who's The King"

== Recording and production ==
The album was recorded at the Ambient Recording Co. in Stamford, CT. It was produced, mixed and engineered by Jason Corsaro.

Alongside the band, the album features additional musicians.

Paul Vercesi played saxophone on the album alongside the band's saxophone player Scott Mueller. Kevin Reilly played saxophone on "Strip Song". Doug Wilson, Rasheed Godlowe and Chris Finn make a vocal appearance in "No Fronts". Doug Wilson also made a vocal appearance in "In the Doghouse".

Darryl Jenifer from the legendary punk band Bad Brains made a vocal appearance in "Who's the King".

Brian Fitzpatrick and Ethan Piper provided backup vocals for the album.

Despite being in the band, Scott Mueller was credited as an additional saxophone player.

== Release and promotion ==
The album was released on May 24, 1994, and was made available on audio cassette, CD and Vinyl in North America, Europe, Japan, Brazil and later in Turkey and South Korea. The special edition with a green cd case was released in 1994 in Europe on CD and cassette. The special edition featured remixes of "If These Are Good Times", "Who's The King?" and "No Fronts", the remixers were not credited. This edition also featured 3 songs from their debut EP Warrant released in 1993 ("It's Like That", "World Keeps Spinning" and "Dog Eat Dog"). The Japanese edition features same 3 songs from the Warrant EP. Some European editions featured the Jam Master Jay remix of "No Fronts".

=== Singles ===
"No Fronts" was released as the lead single in 1994. The music video was played on TV, but the single did not chart. In 1994 the second single was released, this time it was the song "If These Are Good Times", which didn't chart as well. In 1995 the band released the third single and it was the song "Who's the King". The song and its music video became a big hit in Europe. The music video was in heavy rotation on MTV and MTV Europe, and it peaked at number 34 in Sweden and spent 2 weeks on the chart. In 1995. due to the success of the album, they released a maxi single titled "No Fronts: The Remixes". The music video for the remix by Jam Master Jay from Run-DMC was on heavy rotation on MTV and the maxi single peaked at number 9 in the UK.

=== Touring ===
The band toured in support of the album in North America and Europe as well as opened for Biohazard in beginning. While they were playing mostly club gigs in North America, they would play festivals and bigger venues in Europe. During the tour, they would share stages with bands like: Biohazard, Type O Negative, Paradise Lost, Machine Head, Foo Fighters, Green Day, NOFX and more. Most notable festivals being Pinkpop, Lowlands and Dynamo Open Air, where they played in front of 120,000 people. They also headlined the "Crossing Ol' Over" tour that featured bands Downset, Such a Surge and Dub War.

== Critical reception ==
Professional ratings
Review scores
| Source | Rating |
|---|---|
| AllMusic | 4/5 stars |

AllMusic gave the album a 4-star (out of 5) review of the album.

== Commercial performance ==
While the album did not have much mainstream recognition in the US, the album was a success in Europe, peaking at top 20 in 3 countries with the highest position being in Belgium where it peaked at number 16. The album peaked at number 7 in UK Rock & Metal chart, as well as number 99 in UK Albums Chart. The album would go to be certified gold in Netherlands in 2000 for selling 40,000 copies. The most popular songs on the album were "Who's the King" and "No Fronts" with "Who's the King" peaking at number 34 in Sweden and the music video for the song got a lot of airplay on MTV, and it is considered their most popular song. In 1995 the band would go to be voted the Breakthrough Artist of the Year at the MTV Europe Music Awards, winning over the likes of Alanis Morissette and Weezer. The band would also appear in TV shows like The Word, MTV's Most Wanted and Top of the Pops. In 1996 it was reported that All Boro Kings sold over 400,000 copies worldwide. In 2019, the album has sold over 600,000 copies worldwide.

== In popular culture ==
In December 1994, the music video for the song "No Fronts" was featured in an episode of Beavis and Butt-Head, where the cartoon duo called them "a bunch of butt-munches".

== 25th anniversary reissue ==
On November 22, 2019, Metalville records released a 25th anniversary edition of All Boro Kings on CD and on LP

== Track listing ==
All tracks are written by Dog Eat Dog.

| No. | Title | Length |
|---|---|---|
| 1. | "If These Are Good Times" | 3:08 |
| 2. | "Think" | 3:06 |
| 3. | "No Fronts" | 4:36 |
| 4. | "Pull My Finger" | 3:34 |
| 5. | "Who's the King?" | 3:55 |
| 6. | "Strip Song" | 2:44 |
| 7. | "Queen" | 2:24 |
| 8. | "In the Doghouse" | 5:49 |
| 9. | "Funnel King" | 2:41 |
| 10. | "What Comes Around" | 3:23 |
| Total length: | | 35:20 |

European special edition
| No. | Title | Length |
|---|---|---|
| 1. | "If These Are Good Times (Remix)" | 3:09 |
| 2. | "Think" | 3:07 |
| 3. | "No Fronts" | 4:36 |
| 4. | "Pull My Finger" | 3:34 |
| 5. | "Who's the King? (Slight Remix)" | 3:33 |
| 6. | "Strip Song" | 2:45 |
| 7. | "Queen" | 2:45 |
| 8. | "In the Doghouse" | 5:49 |
| 9. | "Funnel King" | 2:41 |
| 10. | "What Comes Around" | 3:25 |
| 11. | "It's Like That" | 5:16 |
| 12. | "Dog Eat Dog" | 4:28 |
| 13. | "World Keeps Spinnin'" | 3:06 |
| 14. | "No Fronts (Not Pearl Jam Mix)" | 4:32 |
| Total length: | | 52:26 |

== Personnel ==
Dog Eat Dog

- John Connor - vocals
- Dan Nastasi - guitar, vocals
- Dave Neabore - bass, vocals
- Sean Kilkenny - guitar
- Dave Maltby - drums

Additional musicians

- Scott Mueller - saxophone
- Paul Vercesi - saxophone
- Kevin Reilly - saxophone on "Strip Song"
- Doug Wilson - vocals on "In the Dog House" & "No Fronts"
- Rasheed Godlowe - vocals on "No Fronts"
- Chris Finn - vocals on "No Fronts"
- Darryl Jenifer - additional vocals on "Who's the King"
- Brian Fitzpatrick and Ethan Piper - additional backup vocals

Production

- Jason Corsaro - production, engineering and mixing
- Tom Bender - assistant engineer
- Mark Conese - technical assistant

== Charts ==
=== Weekly charts ===
| Chart (1995) | Peak position |
|---|---|
| Austrian Albums (Ö3 Austria) | 21 |
| Belgian Albums (Ultratop Flanders) | 16 |
| Belgian Albums (Ultratop Wallonia) | 23 |
| German Albums (Offizielle Top 100) | 30 |
| Dutch Albums (Album Top 100) | 17 |
| Swiss Albums (Schweizer Hitparade) | 17 |
| UK Rock & Metal Albums (Official Charts) | 7 |

| Chart (1996) | Peak position |
|---|---|
| UK Albums (Official Charts) | 99 |
| UK Rock & Metal Albums (Official Charts) | 9 |

=== Year-end charts ===
| Chart (1995) | Position |
|---|---|
| Belgian Albums (Ultratop Flanders) | 51 |
| Belgian Albums (Ultratop Wallonia) | 94 |
| German Albums (Offizielle Top 100) | 38 |

== Certifications ==
| Region | Certification | Certified units/sales |
|---|---|---|
| Netherlands (NVPI) | Gold | 50,000^{^} |
^{^} Shipments figures based on certification alone.
