= Play Games (Dog Eat Dog album) =

Studio album by Dog Eat Dog
- Released: June 2, 1996
- Genre: Rap rock; rap metal; punk
- Length: 37:07
- Label: Roadrunner
- Producer: Butcher Bros.; Robert Musso

Dog Eat Dog chronology
All Boro Kings (1994)	Play Games (1996)	Amped (1999)

Singles from Play Games
- 1. "Isms" Released: 1996; 2. "Rocky" Released: 1996; 3. "Step Right In" Released: 1997

Play Games is the second studio album by American rock band Dog Eat Dog. It was released on June 2, 1996, by Roadrunner Records. The album shows a change of sound in the band, shifting from the hardcore punk sound they performed on their previous album, All Boro Kings, to a more pop-punk sound. The album was successful in Europe and the music videos for the songs "Isms" and "Rocky" received heavy rotation on TV. The album peaked at number 40 in the UK Albums Chart. The album also peaked at number 5 in the UK Rock & Metal chart. The album was certified gold in Belgium two months after the release of the album. Ronnie James Dio of Dio and RZA of Wu-Tang Clan make vocal appearances on the album. Play Games is the first of the band's albums to feature Brandon Finley on drums, as well as the only album to feature Marc DeBacker on guitar and Scott Mueller on saxophone.

== Recording and production ==
Tracks 1, 2, 4, 6 and 8 were recorded and mixed at the Studio 4 and Big Zone Studios in Conshohocken, Pennsylvania. The tracks mentioned were produced, mixed and recorded by the Butcher Bros, known for working with artists like Anthrax, Cypress Hill, Fugees and more.

Tracks 3, 7, 9 and 11 were recorded and mixed at the Sony Recording Studio in New York City. The tracks mentioned were produced, recorded and mixed by Robert Musso, known for working with artists like Jimi Hendrix, Blondie, Ozzy Osbourne and more.

The song "Step Right in" was recorded at RPM Studios in New York City. The song was produced by RZA from Wu-Tang Clan, who also makes a vocal appearance on the song. The song was mixed by Steve Ett at Chung King Studios in New York City. The collaboration with RZA happened as a result of vocalist John Connor sharing a lawyer with the rapper. The two met at the waiting room of the lawyer's office and discussed music. After the discussion, Connor explained that his band was interested in working with a hip-hop producer, to which RZA replied that he was looking to work with a live band. Dog Eat Dog and RZA met at RPM Studios in New York City and after hours of jamming, "Step Right In" was recorded.

The album was mastered by Chris Gehringer at The Hit Factory in New York City.

When recording the song "Games", the band joked about John Connor's vocals sounding like Ronnie James Dio. The label overheard the idea and decided to contact Dio's management. As a result, Dio recorded the song with them.

Dave Neabore wrote and composed the song "Rocky". When he arrived at the studio to record the song, Connor had to leave the studio early. As a result, the band decided to record the song with Neabore on vocals.

On the song "Games", American sports announcer Ian Eagle, makes an appearance.

== Music and lyrics ==
The album shows a change of sound in the band, shifting from their raw hardcore punk to a more distinct pop-punk sound. Despite that, this album contains wide range of genres including rap metal ("Bulletproof", "Step Right In"), hardcore punk ("Numb") and more.

Unlike their previous album, some songs from the album talks about social issues. The song "Bulletproof" talks about gun violence, while the song "Isms" talks about racism, sexism.

== Release and promotion ==
Play Games was released on June 2, 1996, by Roadrunner Records on CD, vinyl and audio cassette. The album was made available in North America, Europe, South America, and Asia.

=== Singles ===
The band released the song "Isms" as the lead single in 1996. The song received significant airplay on TV and debuted at number 19 in Finland. It also debuted at number 3 in UK Rock & Metal chart. In the same year the band released the song "Rocky" as the second single. The music video didn't get much airplay on MTV; however, the song got significant airplay on VIVA. The song "Step Right In" was released in 1997 as the third single.

=== Touring ===
The band toured US and Europe as well as Asia in support of the album. In United States they opened for No Doubt and they became really good friends with the band. They also took part in the Vans Warped Tour in 1996. In Europe they played concert halls and festivals, most notable ones being Pinkpop, Pukkelpop, Roskilde, Eurockéennes and Monsters of Rock where they played in front of 75,000 people and is the third largest crowd Dog Eat Dog has ever played in front of. During the tour, they shared stages with much more important acts than before like: Sepultura, Deftones, Rage Against the Machine, Kiss, Ozzy Osbourne and Metallica.

== Critical reception ==
Professional ratings
Review scores
Source	Rating
AllMusic	3/5 stars
Visions	6/12 stars

The album was met with mostly good reviews from critics. In the AllMusic review, Stephen Thomas Erlewine said that "with their second album, the band improved their crunching fusion of metal, punk, hip-hop and reggae from their debut album, offering a more muscular production and more developed songwriting"

German music magazine Visions in their review said that "The album isn't amazingly innovative, however that doesn't make "Play Games" a bad album"

== Commercial performance ==
Like the previous album All Boro Kings, the album didn't receive significant mainstream recognition in USA, though it saw success in Europe, debuting at number 40 in UK Albums Chart as well as number 5 in UK Rock & Metal chart. The album would be certified gold in Belgium in 1996, two months after the release of the album, for selling 25,000 copies. They also made their second appearance in the French talk show Nulle Part Ailleurs. With the release of the album, the band expanded its fanbase to Asia, performing in countries like Singapore, Thailand, Japan and more. This was their last album to be recognized in the UK charts.

== In popular culture ==
The song "Rocky" was featured in a Guinness commercial in the United Kingdom and Ireland in 1996.

== Track listing ==
All tracks are written by Dog Eat Dog.

No.	Title	Writer(s)	Length
1.	"Bulletproof"		3:14
2.	"Isms"		3:11
3.	"Hi-Lo"		3:02
4.	"Rocky"	Dave Neabore	2:26
5.	"Step Right In"	RZA	3:50
6.	"Rise Above"		2:46
7.	"Games"		5:25
8.	"Getting Live"		3:10
9.	"Buggin'"		3:12
10.	"Numb"		3:07
11.	"Sore Loser"		3:48
Total length:			37:07

== Personnel ==
Dog Eat Dog

- John Connor - vocals
- Sean Kilkenny - guitar
- Marc DeBacker - guitar
- Dave Neabore - bass, vocals
- Scott Mueller - saxophone, keyboard, vocals
- Brandon Finley - drums

Additional musicians

- Paul Vercesi - horns
- Jon Vercesi - horns
- Keene Carse - horns
- Kevin Batchelor - horns
- Heartbeat - percussion on "Rise Above"
- Jeannie Brooks - vocals on "Isms"
- Ronnie James Dio - vocals on "Games"
- Danny Ilchuk - vocals on "Getting Live"
- Chippy Love - vocals on "Getting Live"
- RZA - vocals on "Step Right In"

Production

- Butcher Bros. - production, recording and mixing
- Robert Musso - production, recording and mixing
- RZA - production
- Steve Ett - mixing
- Dirk Grobelny - engineer
- David Voigt - engineer
- Jim Caruana - assistant engineer
- Jay Nicholas - assistant engineer
- Chris Gehringer - mastering (at The Hit Factory)

== Charts ==
=== Weekly charts ===
Chart (1996)	Peak position
Austrian Albums (Ö3 Austria)	12
Belgian Albums (Ultratop Flanders)	12
Belgian Albums (Ultratop Wallonia)	20
German Albums (Offizielle Top 100)	13
Dutch Albums (Album Top 100)	26
Swiss Albums (Schweizer Hitparade)	22
Finnish Albums (Suomen virallinen lista)	14
UK Albums (OCC)	40
Scottish Albums (OCC)	67
UK Rock & Metal Albums (OCC)	5

=== Year-end charts ===
Chart (1996)	Position
German Albums (Offizielle Top 100)	94

== Certifications ==
Region	Certification	Certified units/sales
Belgium (BRMA)	Gold	25,000^{*}
^{*} Sales figures based on certification alone.
