= Isms (song) =

Single by Dog Eat Dog

from the album Play Games
- Released: 1996
- Genre: Pop-punk; rap rock
- Length: 3:13
- Label: Roadrunner
- Producer: Butcher Bros.

"Isms" is a song made by the American band Dog Eat Dog from their second album Play Games. It was released as a single in 1996 by Roadrunner Records. The song and its music video were a success in Europe.

== Commercial performance ==
The song and its music video were a commercial success in Europe, with its music video being on rotation on MTV and other European TV, as well as the song debuting at no. 19 in Finland. The song also debuted at no. 3 in UK Rock & Metal chart.

== Track listing ==
No.	Title	Length
1.	"Isms"	3:13
2.	"Getting Live"	3:09
3.	"Isms" (Royale With Cheese Remix)	4:23
4.	"Isms" (Instrumental With Cheese)	5:09
Total length:		15:54

== Charts ==
Chart (1996)	Peak position
Finland (Suomen virallinen lista)	19
Germany (GfK)	71
UK Singles (OCC)	43
UK Rock & Metal (OCC)	3
