= Amped (Dog Eat Dog album) =

Studio album by Dog Eat Dog
- Released: June 14, 1999
- Studio: Central Studios, Bladensburg, MD
- Genre: Rap rock; funk; punk
- Length: 41:00
- Label: Roadrunner
- Producer: Italric

Dog Eat Dog chronology
Play Games (1996)	Amped (1999)	Walk with Me (2006)

Singles from Amped
- 1. "Expect The Unexpected" Released: 1999

Amped is the third studio album by American rock band Dog Eat Dog. It was released by Roadrunner Records exclusively in Europe. The album was a commercial failure in comparison to the previous two albums. It only charted in Germany, where it debuted at number 42. The album's only single, "Expect the Unexpected", debuted at number 94 in the UK singles chart. This was the band's final album released through Roadrunner Records as well as the last album to feature Sean Kilkenny on guitar.

== Recording and production ==
The album was recorded in Central Studios in Bladensburg, Maryland.

The album was produced, recorded and mixed by Italric, a friend of Brandon Finley who also owned the studio.

The band spent four days a week in the studio and recorded 15 new songs in a span of ten months.

== Release and promotion ==
The album was released on June 14, 1999, in Europe on CD, audio cassette and vinyl.

=== Singles ===
In 1999, the band released "Expect the Unexpected" as the first and only single. The song debuted at number 94 in the UK singles chart. A music video for the song was also released

=== Touring ===
The band toured Europe in support of the album. Despite losing popularity, the band managed to play bigger European festivals like Pukkelpop and Bizarre. In 1999, German TV show Rockpalast broadcast the band's performance at the Bizarre Festival. During the tour, they shared stages with bands like Red Hot Chili Peppers, The Offspring, Silverchair and more.

== Critical reception ==
Professional ratings
Review scores
Source	Rating
Visions	4/12

The album received mostly positive reviews from critics.

German music magazine "Visions" criticized the album, saying that "Despite the band trying to sound hardcore or funky, a lot of bands can convey their style about 100 percent emphatically". The magazine also said that "Their time is slowly coming to an end"

== Commercial performance ==
The album was a commercial failure in comparison to the previous two albums. The album only charted in Germany, where it debuted at number 42. The band made their third appearance on the French talk show Nulle part ailleurs, where they performed the song "Expect The Unexpected".

Due to the band being disappointed in Roadrunner's support of the album, as well as not getting the album released in their home country, the band left the label. In response, Roadrunner released the compilation album In the Dog House: The Best and the Rest on May 22, 2001, without the band's input.

== Track listing ==
All tracks are written by Dog Eat Dog.

No.	Title	Length
1.	"Gangbusters"	1:56
2.	"Expect the Unexpected"	3:41
3.	"Whateverman"	3:24
4.	"Modern Day Devils"	3:11
5.	"Get Up"	3:39
6.	"Always the Same"	3:24
7.	"Big Wheel"	3:59
8.	"In the City"	3:43
9.	"Right Out"	3:01
10.	"One Day"	4:15
11.	"True Color"	2:53
12.	"In Time (Growing Came)"	3:53
Total length:		41:00

== Personnel ==
Dog Eat Dog

- John Connor – vocals
- Sean Kilkenny – guitar, vocals
- Dave Neabore – bass, vocals
- Brandon Finley – drums

Additional musicians

- Dan Lipman – guitar (Wah)
- Milton Elijiah Russ II – percussion
- Heartbeat – percussion, vocals
- Skip Pruitt – saxophone
- Paul Vercesi – saxophone, flute
- Mr. Sinister – scratches
- Greg Boyer – trombone
- Bennie Cowan – trumpet
- Kevin Bachelor – trumpet
- Sherman Abraham – vocals

Production

- Italric – production, recording, mixing, mastering, engineering
- Bryan West – engineering

== Charts ==
Chart (1999)	Peak position
German Albums (Offizielle Top 100)	42
