= Ludichrist =

American crossover thrash band

- Origin: Long Island, New York, U.S.
- Genres: Crossover thrash; hardcore punk; thrash metal
- Years active: 1984–1989, 2012–present
- Labels: CBGBs; In Effect; Combat Core; We Bite (Europe)
- Spinoffs: Scatterbrain
- Members: Tommy Christ; Glen Cummings; Paul Nieder; Guy Brogna; Dave Miranda
- Past members: Alan Bazin aka "Al Batross"; Mark Kanabrocki; Joe Butcher; Chuck Valle; Mike Walters; Tony Scaglione

Ludichrist is an American crossover thrash band formed in Long Island, New York in 1984. They are one of the crossover movement's most prominent groups, alongside D.R.I.

== History ==
=== Early history and recordings ===
Ludichrist was founded in 1984 by Al Batross (aka Al Bazin) and Mark Durnex (aka Mark Kanabrocki) in Long Island, New York. The first line-up included Batross on drums, Durnex on guitar, Chud on vocals, and Chuck Valle on bass. Batross, the group's first wordsmith named the group and wrote the lyrics for the core group of songs the band played. Durnex wrote the songs. After a few months Tommy Christ replaced Chud as vocalist, and the group produced a demo cassette tape titled "Ludichrist" and leveraged it to book performances at regional venues that allowed punk shows.

Guitarist Glen Cummings joined the group as lead guitarist, and after a few rehearsals the group decided to re-record its demo tape to highlight its new, denser sound. The group recorded "Ludichrist, The Demo", and released it on cassette. The cassette features a graphic "cover" and a 16-page illustrated booklet designed by Christ and Cummings. The group purchased a half-page space in Maximum Rock n Roll fanzine to advertise the cassette.

=== CBGBs Records ===
The group performed mainly in NYC where there were existing venues and a hardcore scene, but the group first substantial following grew out of a series of shows at Club Anthrax in Connecticut, enabling the group to larger crowds around the east coast region. After a series of energized performances at his venue, CBGBs owner Hilly Kristal asked the group to release a live recording of their show on CBGBs record label which he was reviving through a series of cassette-only releases. Instead of releasing the live performance made on the venues mixing console earlier that day the group waited until the venue was closed then performed a more precise version of its set to only the engineer, Steve. This live recording was expertly combined with crowd sounds from the earlier matinee and released as "CBGBs Live "Off the Board" Ludichrist".

Founding member, Mark Durnex (aka Mark Kanabrocki) who had written most of the first album's songs appears only on the two demos and the CBGBs cassette – leaving the group before Immaculate Deception was recorded. Long Island native and ludichrist fan Joe Butcher joined the group as second guitarist, bringing his active musical sensibilities with him. Joe wrote the music for the album track "Thinking of You" – lyrics by Tommy Christ.

Per an interview with Cummings that was posted on Facebook in November 2024 by Blasted by Britton, a reissue of the CBGBs cassette is being discussed with Megaforce Records.

=== Immaculate Deception ===
Immaculate Deception features the lineup Batross, Butcher, Christ, Cummings, and Valle, and was recorded at Platinum Island Sounds in Manhattan with Randy Burns producing. The album track "You Can't Have Fun" features guest vocalists Roger Miret, John Connelly, Chris Notaro, and Eddie Sutton from fellow New York bands Agnostic Front, Nuclear Assault, Crumbsuckers and Leeway. Drummer and founder Al Batross left the group after Immaculate Deception was recorded.

=== Powertrip ===
By the time their second album, Powertrip, was released, only two original members, singer Tommy and guitarist Glen, were left. The band became far more metallic in style, while retaining a range of musical influences and being more overtly humorous, they abandoned the early hardcore style and featured musicianship by Paul Neider (guitar) and Dave Miranda (drums) in particular. After the American tour bassist Mike Walter departed and Guy Bronga joined the group. After the European tour drummer Dave Miranda departed and Mike Boyko joined the group.

Before the release of Ludichrist' third album "Here Comes Trouble" on In Effect Records, the group renamed itself Scatterbrain, to circumvent a boycott by conservative Christian record distributors.

In a Nov. 2024 interview with Blasted By Britton, Cummings shared that a three-song demo for Powertrip, known as both The Basement Demos and And We Mean That, will be issued in the future by F.O.A.D. Records.

=== Post-Ludichrist ===
Al Batross (Al Bazin) formed Big Sniff (with releases on both Mint Tone Records and Do iT! Records in Germany) with future members of The Arsons and Kill Your Idols in the 1990s. From 2001 through 2003 Batros played with MDC (Millions of Dead Cops). As of 2008, Batross continues to live in NYC and has been the sole American member in three all-Japanese bands: The Plungers, The Spunks and Gelatine. Bazin is also a film and video editor.

Original bassist Chuck Valle joined Murphy's Law, and had become an audio engineer (see Six and Violence), but was stabbed to death in California.

== Musical style ==
The band's musical style broke from the conventions of New York hardcore by adding aspects of rock, heavy metal and jazz, such as musical interludes and extended guitar solos. Drummer Dave Miranda saw Ludichrist as "crossing into both, punk and metal without firmly belonging into either camp." He observed that "the band was readily influenced by bands around them such as Crumbsuckers and Agnostic Front."

== Members ==
- Al Batross (aka Alan Bazin), drums
- Guy Brogna, bass
- Joe Butcher, guitar
- Tommy Christ, vocals
- Glen Cummings, guitar
- Mark Durnex (aka Mark Kanabrocki), guitar
- Dave Miranda, drums
- Paul Nieder, guitar
- Tony Scaglione, drums
- Mike Walter, bass
- Chuck Valle, bass

== Discography ==
- Ludichrist, cassette (1984)
- Ludichrist, The Demo, cassette (1985)
- There's a Method to Our Madness, compilation, LP (1985)
- Ludichrist, CBGB Live "Off the Board", cassette (1985)
- Ludichrist, Young White and Well Behaved, cassette (1986)
- Ludichrist, Immaculate Deception, LP, cassette (1986)
- Ludichrist, And I Mean That! demo, cassette (1987)
- Ludichrist, Powertrip, LP, cassette, CD (1988)
- Ludichrist, Immaculate Deception & Powertrip, double CD (2014)
- Ludichrist, God Is Everywhere Demos and Live, double LP (2020)
