= Scatterbrain (band) =

American metal band

- Scatterbrain in 1991

Background information
- Origin: Long Island, New York, U.S.
- Genres: Funk metal, thrash metal, comedy rock
- Years active: 1989–1995 (reunion: 2007)
- Labels: Relativity; Elektra; Pavement
- Spinoff of: Ludichrist
- Members: Tommy Christ; Glen Cummings; Paul Nieder; Guy Brogna; Mike Boyko

Scatterbrain was an American band from Long Island, New York that played heavy metal, thrash metal, funk, and punk, with humorous lyrics. It was active between 1989 and 1994. Some members reunited to perform shows in 2007.

== History ==
Scatterbrain was founded in 1989 by Tommy Christ and Glen Cummings after the break-up of their group Ludichrist. The band members are from Long Island, New York.

Their live shows combined Mozart medleys, Motörhead covers, cross-dressing, and chicken costumes. Their song "Don't Call Me Dude" was a top-twenty hit in Australia. Its video, directed by George Seminara, received regular rotation on MTV's Headbangers Ball with Riki Rachtman, and was featured in Beavis and Butt-Head's "Blood Drive" episode. The band contributed a cover of LL Cool J's "Mama Said Knock You Out" to the soundtrack of the 1992 film Encino Man.

In 1992, Cummings left the band, moved to Nashville, and founded rap-rock group Stone Deep with members of The Hard Corps. Christ, Neider, Brogna, and Boyko wrote and recorded the band's third release, a seven-song EP titled Mundus Intellectualis (1994). The band ceased all activities in 1994.

In 2007, Christ, Neider, Brogna, and Ludichrist drummer Dave Miranda reunited to perform several Scatterbrain / Ludichrist reunion shows. Cummings did not participate.

In a November 2024 interview, Cummings revealed that there was a third, unreleased Scatterbrain album, Hot Garbage, recorded for, and rejected by, Elektra Records.

== Discography ==
=== Studio albums ===
List of studio albums, with selected details and chart positions
Title	Album details	Peak chart positions	
Title	Album details	US	AUS
Here Comes Trouble	Released: 1990; Format: CD, LP, cassette; Label: In-Effect (88561–3012–1)	138	54
Scamboogery	Released: 1991; Format: CD, LP, cassette; Label: Elektra (E2 61224)	—	—

=== Live albums ===
List of live albums, with selected details and chart positions
Title	Album details	Peak chart positions
Title	Album details	AUS
Live from the Basement	Released: 1991; Format: CD, cassette; Label: Shock	85

=== Extended plays ===
List of extended plays, with selected details and chart positions
Title	EP details	Peak chart positions
Title	EP details	AUS
Return of the Dudes	Released: 1992; Format: CD, cassette; Label: Shock	92
Mundus Intellectualis	Released: 1994; Format: CD, cassette; Label: Pavement Music (72445-15004-2)	—

=== Charting singles ===
List of singles, with selected chart positions
Title	Year	Peak chart positions		Album
Title	Year	AUS	NZ	Album
"Don't Call Me Dude"	1990	14	43	Here Comes Trouble
"Down with the Ship (Slight Return)"	1991	90	—	Here Comes Trouble
