= Dog Eat Dog (band) =

American rock band

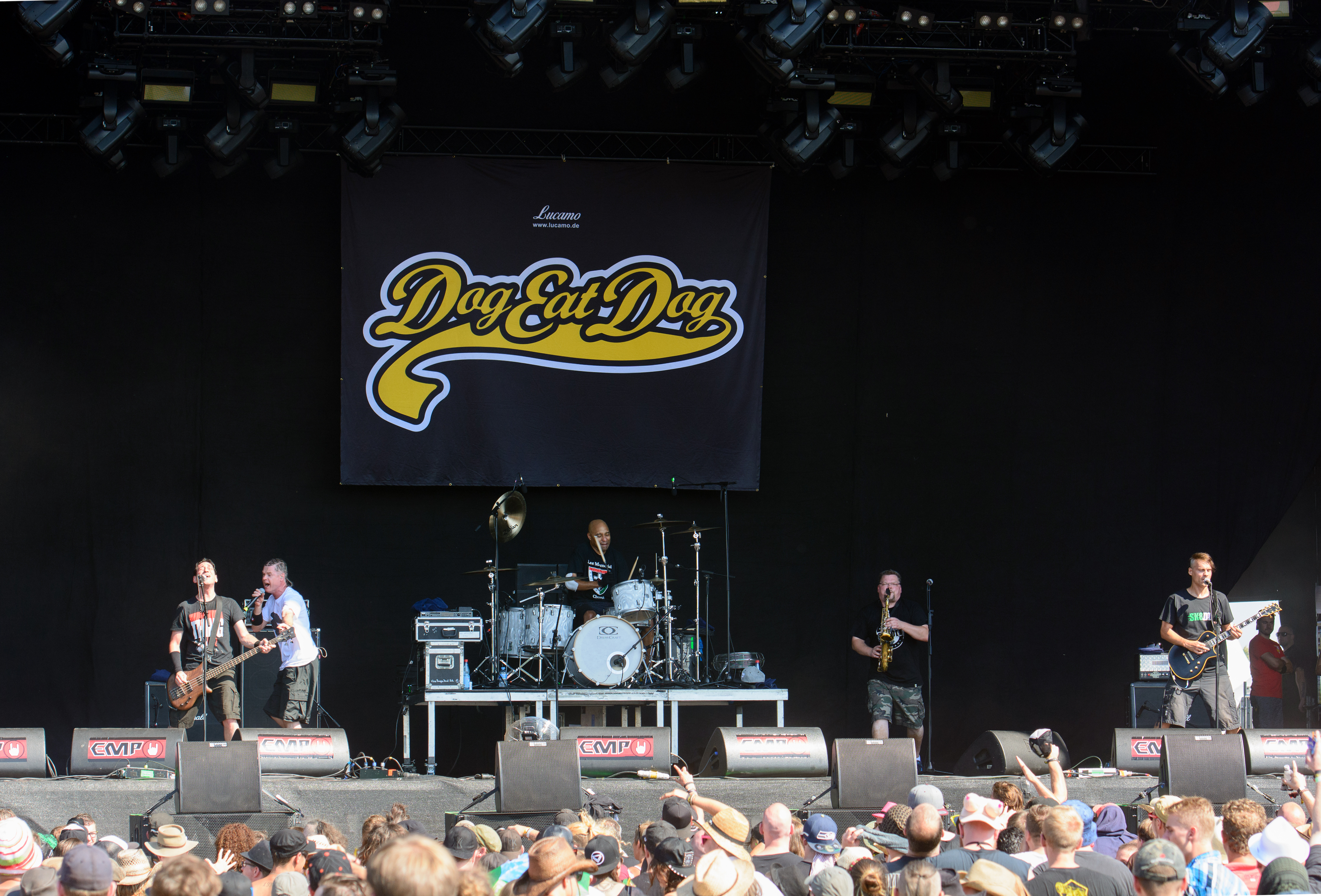
- Dog Eat Dog performing at the 2016 Reload Festival in Germany

Background information
- Origin: Bergen County, New Jersey, U.S.
- Genres: Rap rock; rap metal; punk rock; funk
- Years active: 1990–present
- Labels: Roadrunner; Wanted
- Members: Dave Neabore; John Connor; Brandon Finley; Roger Haemmerli
- Past members: Dan Nastasi; Sean Kilkenny; Brett; John Milnes; Kevin Reilly; Mark Mari; Dave Maltby; Scott Mueller; Marc DeBacker; Matt Salem
- Website: dogeatdogofficial.com

Dog Eat Dog is an American band that fuses a variety of genres, such as hardcore punk, rock, metal, hip-hop, and funk. Formed in Bergen County, New Jersey in 1990, the band was one of the earliest to combine metal and rap together. The group has released five full-length albums and two EPs. As of 2009, the lineup consists of Dave Neabore (bass), John Connor (vocals), Brandon Finley (drums), and Roger Haemmerli (guitar).

== History ==
=== Formation and early demos (1989–1991) ===
Bassist Dave Neabore had joined Bergenfield, New Jersey band Mucky Pup before the recording of Mucky Pup's second album, A Boy in a Man's World. Soon after the album's 1989 release, guitarist Dan Nastasi quit Mucky Pup to help form the band Non-Fiction with former members of the band Hades and to briefly join Murphy's Law. Sean Kilkenny was a friend of Mucky Pup's who would occasionally play guitar with the band at social gatherings. His friendship and experience with the band led to his being hired as Nastasi's replacement. Kilkenny performed with the band for several New Jersey area shows before joining them on a European tour as well.

Neabore and Kilkenny began writing music together for Mucky Pup. When the music did not quite fit Mucky Pup's style, the two friends decided to form their own band. It wasn't long before friend and former Mucky Pup crew member, John Connor joined the duo on vocals. Connor had already been a vocalist for several local bands and together, the trio wrote songs like "Funnel King", "Strip Song", and "Psychorama". After a long search, the band also found a drummer known simply as Brett. After several rehearsals, they held their first "official" performance in Neabore's basement on April 1, 1990. The band packed fifty people into Neabore's basement and held a toga party. Kevin Reilly, a band friend, was invited to perform with the band on saxophone.

On April 22, 1990, Neabore and Kilkenny performed their final show with Mucky Pup. Shortly after their departure, Nastasi rejoined Mucky Pup and went on to record Now, which featured Marc DeBacker replacing Neabore on bass.

Following a positive reaction from friends, the band began playing birthday parties, ice cream parlors, and college fraternity houses. After hearing several live recordings, Nastasi expressed his interest in playing with the band and was invited to bring his equipment to one of their band practices. The practice sessions were fruitful and Nastasi was asked to join the band. For a short time, Nastasi played with both Dog Eat Dog and Mucky Pup. Brett later quit the band in order to move to San Francisco, and John "Booge" Milnes of Mucky Pup temporarily took the position until a permanent drummer could be found. The band also felt it was time to decide on a permanent name. For their earliest shows, the band had called themselves "Face Off", "F-Troop", "B-Load", and "Rubber Band". Dog Eat Dog was suggested as a name and the band agreed to keep it.

Dog Eat Dog decided to record their songs and entered the studio for two days. The result was their first five-song demo. Kilkenny's contacts with pro skateboarder Andy Howell led to several logo ideas, including the doghouse image used by the band for many years. Howell's artwork was previously used for New Deal Skateboards. With the demo tape completed, they continued to play larger shows. During the shows that followed, Mark Mari joined as the new drummer. The band considered the demo a success and quickly wrote and recorded a second five-song demo.

=== Roadrunner Records and Warrant (1992–1993) ===
While touring Europe, Biohazard guitar player Billy Graziadei gave the new Dog Eat Dog demo tape to a Roadracer Records representative. At the time, Roadracer was the European sister label to Roadrunner Records and the tape was sent back to the New York offices of Roadrunner Records. Roadrunner representatives attended several Dog Eat Dog shows and soon offered Dog Eat Dog their first record deal. Mari decided not to sign the deal, instead opting to spend time with his wife and child. Although the band now had a record deal, they were once again in search of a new drummer.

After trying out only a few hopefuls, Dave "Mopey" Maltby auditioned and was officially hired as the new drummer. The band also found a more serious saxophone player in Scott "Sooty" Mueller who, while not yet a full-time member, would become a frequent guest player at live shows.

Roadrunner Records released Dog Eat Dog's debut album, the Warrant EP, worldwide on July 13, 1993. The title was a lighthearted jab at the band Warrant for releasing an album titled Dog Eat Dog almost a year before. While playing shows along the East Coast of the United States, the band was offered a European tour. Their first overseas tour saw them supporting the Bad Brains and Philadelphia hip hop group The Goats, as well as 7 Seconds and Big Drill Car. It was on this tour that the Bad Brains mentored Dog Eat Dog on touring foreign countries.

=== All Boro Kings and mainstream success (1994–1995) ===
Dog Eat Dog began writing the songs that would become their first full-length album. Titled All Boro Kings, it was released on May 24, 1994. All Boro Kings also brought the saxophone into the foreground of their songs. Tracks like "If These Are Good Times", "Who's the King", and "No Fronts" contained the trademark saxophone sound that the band would be known for. Darryl Jenifer of the Bad Brains also made a vocal appearance on "Who's the King".

With the release of the album, Nastasi decided he could no longer tour for long periods of time due to family and business obligations. The band hired Parris Mayhew of the Cro-Mags to temporarily fill the position with the intention of bringing back Nastasi for local touring and recording.

With a new record in stores, the band toured Europe, once again opening for Biohazard. This proved to be a huge success for Dog Eat Dog. They received critical acclaim for both the new album and their live performances. All Boro Kings went on to sell over 600,000 records worldwide. The band also saw their videos in heavy rotation on MTV Europe. In December 1994, Dog Eat Dog's video for "No Fronts" was featured on an episode of MTV's Beavis and Butthead, where the animated duo referred to the band as "a bunch of butt-munches."

After the tour, Mayhew returned to directing videos as well as forming his new band, White Devil. The band contacted DeBacker, Neabore's replacement in Mucky Pup, with an offer for him to fill-in on guitar on their upcoming tour. Being familiar with the material, he accepted. It was then that Maltby also decided to part ways with the band for personal reasons. He later put together a short-lived band called The Shining Path, with Jenifer of the Bad Brains and the members of Roguish Armament. After many auditions, Brandon Finley, known for his drumming with Chuck Brown, Queen Latifah, Urban Blight, and Chris Haskett of the Rollins Band, was hired. Mueller was also brought on as a full-time saxophone player. The band had always stood out from other hardcore bands because of their addition of a saxophone player. For a good portion of their live shows, as well as their two studio albums, Mueller had held the position. While the albums would list Mueller as a guest musician, he had never been considered a full-time member of the band until now.

MTV would prove to be one factor that would help the band achieve its status. After the surprise hit "Who's the King", the band collaborated with Run–D.M.C. member Jam-Master Jay on a remix of their hit song "No Fronts". The single entered the top ten on the UK Singles Chart, peaking at No. 9, and the video was in heavy rotation on MTV UK. On Thanksgiving Night 1995, they were voted Breakthrough Artists of the Year at the MTV Europe Music Awards, as part of a viewer's choice program and were presented the award by Patsy Kensit and Michael Hutchence of INXS. In winning the award, they defeated the likes of Alanis Morissette, Weezer, H-Blockx, and Portishead. Europe continued to be a large part of the band's fan base. While they were relegated to small clubs at home in America, they were playing festivals and arena-sized shows in Europe, the biggest being the Dynamo Open Air festival in 1995. They also charted on Europe's top forty heavy metal charts while radio stations at home rarely acknowledged them. When the band returned home from Europe, Nastasi decided not to return from his hiatus and the decision was made to keep DeBacker as the full-time guitar player. After leaving Dog Eat Dog, Nastasi recorded two albums, Trim the Fat and Ule Tide, under the name Nastasee. Both albums and their respective tours contained members from both Dog Eat Dog and Mucky Pup.

=== Play Games and a new sound (1996–1997) ===
With summer festivals rapidly approaching and Roadrunner demanding a single by spring, the band was rushed back into the studio with nothing written for the album. They finished songs and wrote lyrics in the studio, sometimes improvising lyrics. While listening to demos for the song "Games", the band joked that Connor's vocals were so heavy metal-like, it wouldn't be right for anyone to sing it like that except heavy metal legend Ronnie James Dio. The idea was overheard by label representatives from Roadrunner who decided to contact Dio's management and see if he would be interested in doing a guest vocal on the record. To the band's surprise, Dio arrived at the studio and recorded the song with them.

Another collaboration on the new record was with the RZA, a member of the Wu-Tang Clan. The RZA shared a lawyer with Dog Eat Dog leading Connor to meet the RZA in the waiting room of the lawyer's office. As the two discussed music, Connor made mention of the band's interest in working with a hip hop producer. The RZA explained that he was actually looking to work with a rock band and after some phone calls, Dog Eat Dog met up with the RZA in a New York City studio. After a few short hours of jamming together, "Step Right In" was recorded. The band recorded the first half of the record with the Butcher Bros., Phil and Joe Nicolo, who had previously produced multi-platinum acts such as Cypress Hill, The Fugees, and Urge Overkill. Working with well-known producers opened up Dog Eat Dog to new ideas in the studio and they experimented with full horn sections and additional musicians to fill out their overall sound. The second half of the album was completed with producer Bob Musso, best known for his previous work with bands such as Murphy's Law and Praxis.

Once finished, the album was titled Play Games, and released on July 2, 1996. The album took the band from their hardcore roots to a distinctly more pop sound. The single "Isms" peaked at No. 43 on the UK Singles Chart. With Play Games released, Dog Eat Dog returned to touring. This time, the band traveled to many countries for the first time. Full tours of Asia, South America, Greece, and Spain followed. The band also shared stages with acts such as Rage Against the Machine, Sepultura, Ozzy Osbourne, Kiss, and Metallica. After playing several West Coast shows with No Doubt, a friendship between the two bands began. Dog Eat Dog later appeared as an opening act when No Doubt came to New York City to film concert footage at The Roseland Ballroom for use in the "Don't Speak" video. Dog Eat Dog soon found themselves playing festivals such as Donington, Reading, PinkPop, and Roskilde.

1996 also saw the usage of the song "Rocky" from the Play Games album used for a Guinness beer commercial in the United Kingdom and Ireland. During this era, Dog Eat Dog also recorded the theme song for the New Jersey Rockin' Rollers, a professional inline hockey team in the Roller Hockey International league. The song was played over the loudspeaker during home games at Continental Airlines Arena at East Rutherford, New Jersey but was never made commercially available.

When Dog Eat Dog returned home from the Play Games tour, more changes took place within the band. Listening back to Play Games, the band felt that the saxophone was drowning out the guitars and the vocals, making those instruments sound less prominent. The band came to the conclusion that the saxophone was not as important as the rest of the music was and Mueller was asked to step down as saxophone player. Mueller has since gone on to form the band Years of Static. At the same time, guitarist DeBacker also expressed a desire to pursue other musical interests and left the band. He briefly returned to Mucky Pup before moving back to Belgium to form the band 10,000 Women Man.

=== Amped and other musical projects (1998–2002) ===
In 1998, after almost two years of constant touring, Dog Eat Dog began working on new material. They worked in a studio four days a week and wrote fifteen new songs in a few short months. These songs would result in the Amped album, recorded in Washington, D.C., with Italric, a friend of Finley's who owned his own studio. The band would spend nearly ten months working on their album and considered it to be their finest work yet. The album was released exclusively in Europe, on June 28, 1999. "Expect the Unexpected" was the first single and video, and it managed to peak at No. 94 on the UK Singles Chart. Due to their disappointment in Roadrunner's support and the fact that their latest album wasn't even available in their own home country, the band decided to part with the Roadrunner label after a seven-year relationship. Roadrunner responded by releasing In the Dog House: The Best and The Rest on May 22, 2001. The album, a compilation of songs and remixes spanning their six years on the Roadrunner label, was released without the band's input or approval.

Over the next few years, the band continued to tour Europe on their own accord. Finding themselves without proper management, Dog Eat Dog were unable to secure a new record label. In 2001, the band recorded two versions of the holiday classic, "Let It Snow! Let It Snow! Let It Snow!". Though never commercially released, the songs were made available to the public through their website.

During this time, band members pursued other musical projects. Producer Tim Gilles approached some of the band members about recording a song for his New York's Hardest: Vol. 3 compilation. When it was requested that the music sound more like their original material, Kilkenny and Neabore reunited with guitarist Nastasi and drummer Milnes. The result was the band All Boro Kings, named after the first full-length Dog Eat Dog album. The project was a throwback to the early days of Dog Eat Dog as it focused on the hardcore style that Dog Eat Dog had displayed on their first two releases. The band was soon signed to Century Media Records who released their debut album Just for the Fun of It on July 22, 2002. The album was released exclusively in Europe due to the strong European fan base for Dog Eat Dog and Mucky Pup. The guests on the album included Dog Eat Dog member Connor and alumni Mueller, and also Jimmy Gestapo of Murphy's Law. All Boro Kings toured with Biohazard, Agnostic Front, and Hatebreed as part of the 2002 Eastpak Resistance Tour of Europe. The remainder of their shows took place in the New Jersey/New York/Connecticut tri-state area. The band continued playing shows through 2004 before quietly disbanding.

Neabore began performing with a band named LowBuz. Initially, Neabore's intention was to fill the empty bass position until the band could find a permanent bass player. Instead, he remained and recorded with the band for several years. Kilkenny kept busy by playing guitar for various NYC hardcore bands including Murphy's Law, Harley's War, and M.O.D.

=== Kilkenny's departure and Walk with Me (2003–2008) ===
Dog Eat Dog played eight shows in 2003 before they were approached by the Vibra Agency, a management group who promised to get the band back on the road and into the studio as well. Dog Eat Dog and Vibra formed a new partnership and in 2004, the band found itself in the studio recording new demo material. The band was also introduced to former pro-skater and musician Claus Grabke, who saw promise in the band's new material. In the summer of 2005, the band recorded twelve new songs with Grabke. The album featured guest vocals by Marta Jandová of the German band Die Happy, as well as German ska musician Dr. Ring-Ding.

Soon after the recording of the songs, it was announced through the band's website that co-founding member Kilkenny had taken a temporary leave from the band; however, Kilkenny did not return and Roger Haemmerli of the Swiss band Henchman served as the band's temporary live guitarist until the hiring of Matt Salem in May 2006.

The album, titled Walk with Me, was released on June 23, 2006, and featured a mix of musical styles that both new and old fans of the band could appreciate. In support of the album, the band played over 35 summer festivals and 40 club dates in 2006. In April 2007, Salem abruptly quit the band and was replaced by Thumb guitarist Axel "Axe" Hilgenstoehler, who toured with the band through the spring and summer of 2007.

After performing a single show in Switzerland, the band took the remainder of 2008 off from touring and recording. The band returned to touring in 2009 to celebrate the fifteenth anniversary of the release of the All Boro Kings album. Haemmerli returned on guitar and the band brought back its trademark saxophone sound by adding Tobi Vogelfänger from the German ska band The Slapstickers. The European tour included shows in Belgium, the Netherlands, Germany, Austria, Switzerland, Slovenia, and Bosnia and was a mix of club dates and festivals.

=== Twentieth anniversary, original lineup reunion, and continued tours (2009–2012) ===
On December 11, 2009, during a Mucky Pup set at Mexicali Live in Teaneck, New Jersey, Connor and Kilkenny joined Nastasi, Neabore, and Milnes onstage to perform two Dog Eat Dog songs. It was the first time this lineup had played together as Dog Eat Dog since their demo tapes had been recorded in the early 1990s.

The band celebrated its twenty-year anniversary on April 1, 2010, and commemorated the event by reuniting the original lineup once again. The lineup consisted of Connor, Neabore, Nastasi, Kilkenny, and Milnes with the addition of Mueller on saxophone and Reilly handling live-sound mixing duties. They performed one show at Mexicali Live on April 2 and another at The Studio at Webster Hall in New York City on April 3. These two shows were a one-time event before the lineup of Connor, Neabore, Finley, and Haemmerli embarked on their 2010 tour of Europe. The tour included over twenty shows in Germany, the Netherlands, Belgium, Czech Republic, and Switzerland.

Dog Eat Dog began its 2011 tour in January and continued with additional dates throughout the year. Guitarist Nastasi returned for three January dates taking place in Germany and the Netherlands. Nastasi was temporarily filling in for the absent Haemmerli who was working with his band Henchman at the time.

=== Brand New Breed (2013–2022) ===
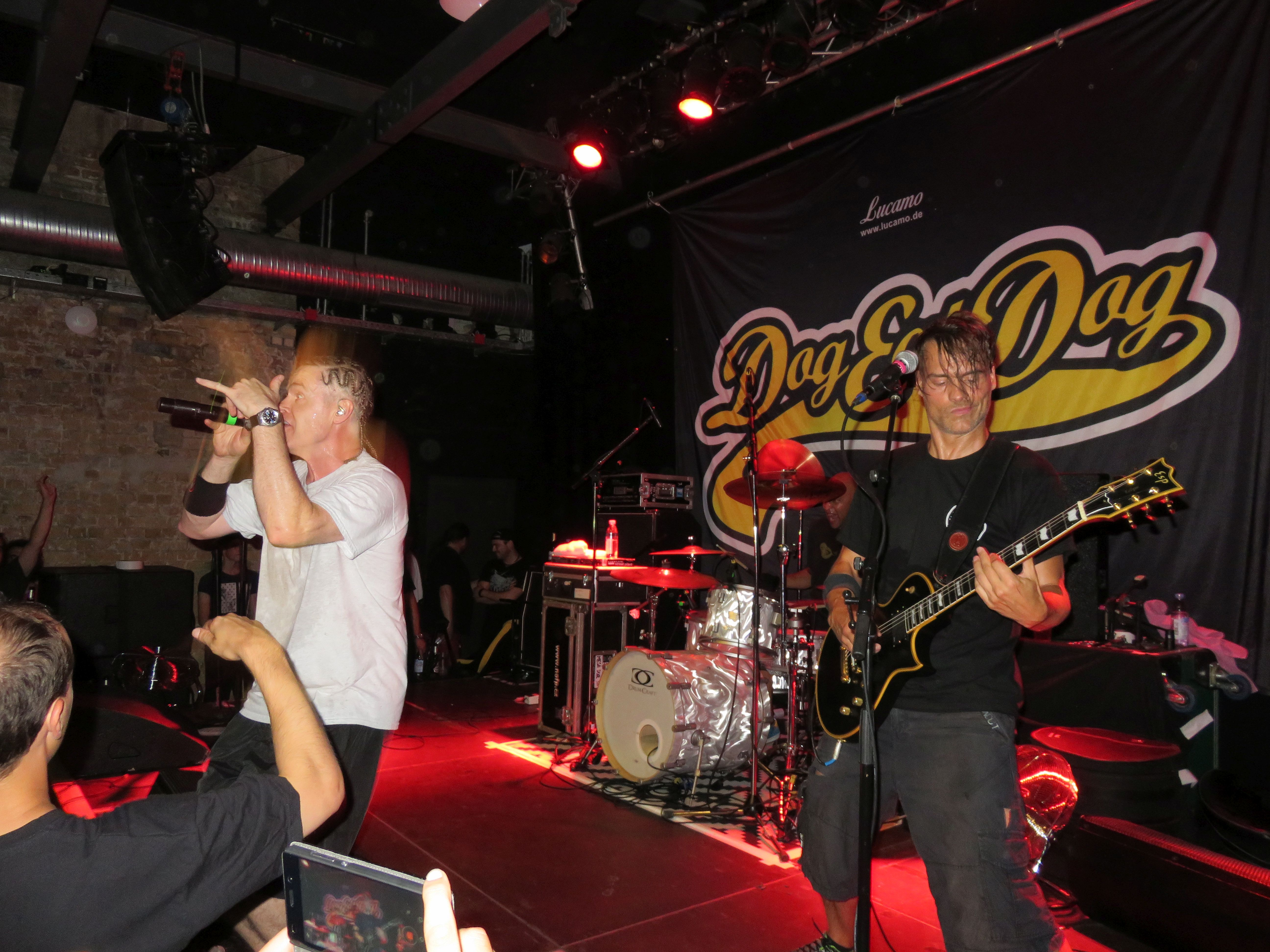
Dog Eat Dog performing in Germany in 2016

In 2017, Dog Eat Dog released their first new material since 2006, an EP titled Brand New Breed. It consisted of four new tracks, and was expanded to include four acoustic/live tracks the following year with a reissue. They embarked on a staggered but extensive tour throughout 2018 and 2019.

In October 2021, founding guitarist Sean Kilkenny died at the age of 51.

In January 2022, the band embarked on its first American tour since 1997, as the opening act for Life of Agony on the latter's Lost at 2022 tour. The band lineup for the tour saw Connor, Neabore, Finley and Haemmerli joined by Nastasi whose band, Kings Never Die, were also scheduled to perform on five of the tour's eight dates. The tour was cancelled after completion of the first four dates due to Life of Agony vocalist Mina Caputo and drummer Veronica Bellino testing positive for COVID-19.

=== Free Radicals (2023) ===
Dog Eat Dog's fifth album, titled Free Radicals, was released by independent label Metalville Records on October 20, 2023.

== Other projects ==
In 1999, Dave Neabore, a devout horror movie fan, contributed music to the For Lucio Fulci: A Symphony of Fear tribute album. The double album consists of cover versions of songs originally featured in the soundtracks of various Lucio Fulci films. Neabore's contribution was the song, "Suite from Luca il Contrabandiere". Other contributors included Gwar, Mike Scaccia of Ministry and James Murphy of Testament. Neabore has since composed the soundtrack to the film Paura: Lucio Fulci Remembered Vol. 1, which was released on DVD in February 2009. Neabore also composed the main title theme to a 2001 zombie film called Biohazardous. Two songs from the band All Boro Kings also appear in the film. Neabore has also directed several short films between 2000 and 2013. The films are Reel Fear (2000), I Love Susie (2001), Hayride To Hell (2003), Lunch Date (2006), Jason Hurts (2008), Dead Bugs On The Carpet (2009) and "When A Stranger Tweets" (2013). In 2010, Neabore directed the music video "Bitch" for the New Jersey–based punk band, DogHouse Swine.

In 2012, Sean Kilkenny rejoined Mucky Pup for several tours of Europe. He continued to play with band during their European tours as well as select North American shows. In January 2013, Kilkenny briefly performed with the band Stigma, fronted by Vinnie Stigma of Agnostic Front.

== Band members ==
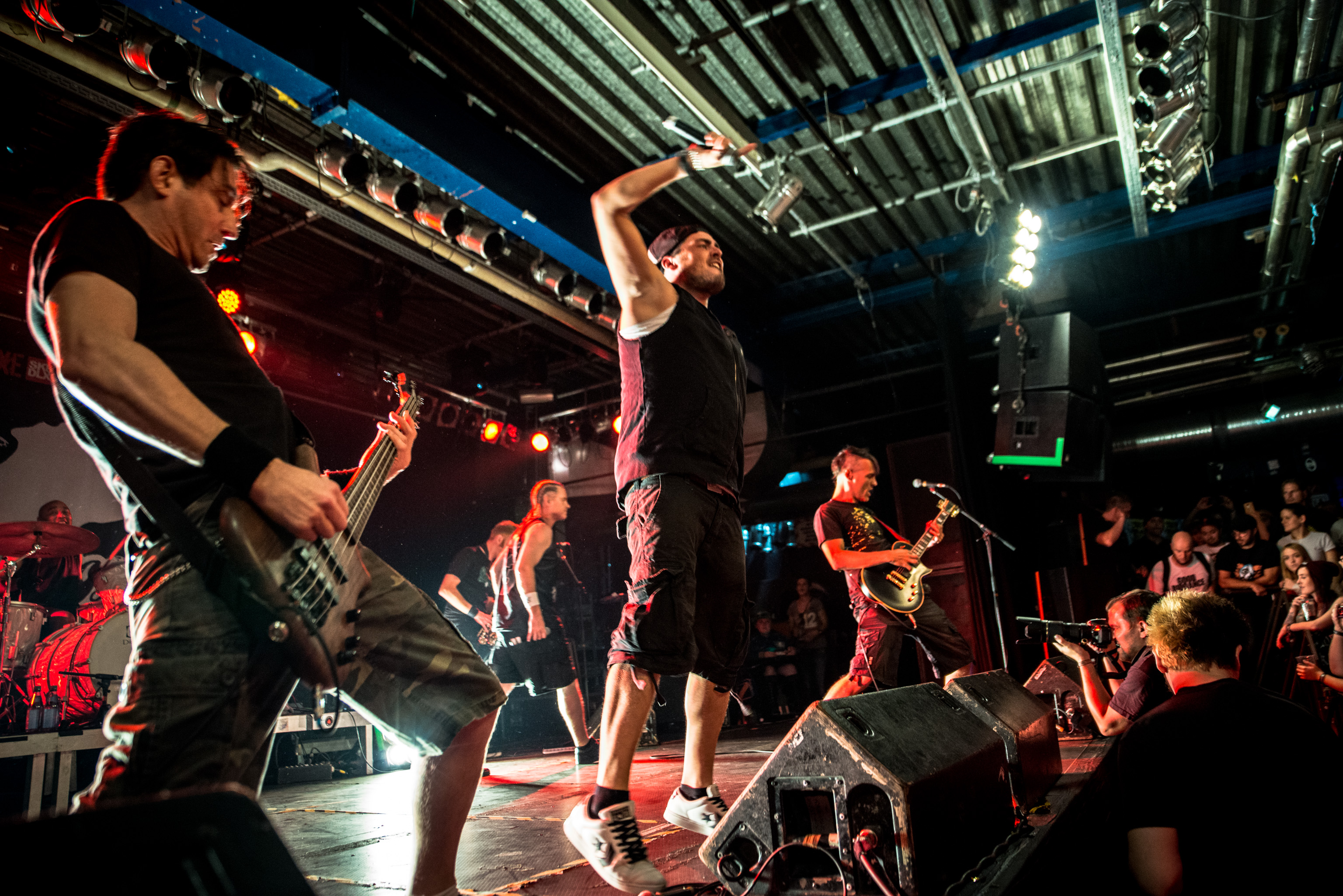
Dog Eat Dog in 2014

Current

- John Connor – vocals (1990–present)
- Dave Neabore – bass, backing vocals (1990–present)
- Brandon Finley – drums (1994–present)
- Roger Haemmerli – guitars (2005–2006, 2008–present)

Former

- Dan Nastasi – guitars (1990–1994; guest 2009–2011, 2015, 2019, 2021–2022, 2024)
- Sean Kilkenny – guitars (1990–2005; guest 2010, 2015); died 2021
- Brett – drums (1990)
- John Milnes – drums (1990–1991; guest 2010)
- Kevin Reilly – saxophone (1990–1992), live sound (guest 2010)
- Mark Mari – drums (1991–1992)
- Dave Maltby – drums (1992–1994)
- Scott Mueller – saxophone (1995–1997; guest 1992–1995, 2010, 2015)
- Marc DeBacker – guitars (1994–1997)
- Matt Salem – guitars (2006–2007)

Touring

- Parris Mayhew – guitars (1994)
- Axel Hilgenstoehler – guitars (2007–2008)
- Tobi Vogelfänger – saxophone (2008–2009)

== Discography ==
- All Boro Kings (1994)
- Play Games (1996)
- Amped (1999)
- Walk with Me (2006)
- Free Radicals (2023)
