= A Boy in a Man's World =

Studio album by Mucky Pup
- Released: 1989
- Recorded: Saugerties, New York
- Genre: Hardcore punk
- Label: Torrid Records
- Producers: Chris Andersen & Mucky Pup

Mucky Pup chronology
Can't You Take A Joke? (1988)	A Boy in a Man's World (1989)	Now (1990)

A Boy in a Man's World is the second studio album by Mucky Pup. The album was recorded at Nevessa Productions and released in 1989 through Torrid Records and Roadrunner Records. The album features a re-recorded version of "U-Stink-But-I-♥-U," which the band had previously won a Bloom County songwriting contest with. The band would also shoot their first music video for this song. The album also features "Batman", a song based on an urban legend that also contains a snippet of the title theme to the 1966 Batman TV.

The album featured cover art by future DC and Marvel comic book artist Nelson DeCastro, who had previously done T-shirt art for the band as well.

Several years after the album went out of print, the band pressed their own version of the CD to sell on their website and at their occasional reunion shows. This version of the album contains five additional live songs not released on the original pressings.

== Credits ==
- Chris Milnes (vocals)
- John Milnes (drums)
- Dan Nastasi (guitars)
- Dave Neabore (bass)

== Track listing ==
1. "U-Stink-But-I-♥-U"
2. "Batman"
3. "Someday"
4. "Homosexual"
5. "Reagan Knew"
6. "Landscrapers"
7. "Never Again"
8. "Death By Cholesterol"
9. "P.T.L. (We Want Your Money)"
10. "A Boy in a Man's World"
11. "Little Pigs"
12. "All's Cool"
13. "Jam It"
14. "Whasky Wabbit"
15. "Big Freeze"
16. "Little Pigs Intro" *
17. "Little Pigs" *
18. "P.T.L. Intro" *
19. "P.T.L." *
20. "You Stink But I Love You" *

(* Live versions only available on Mucky Records re-issue)
