= Biohazard discography =

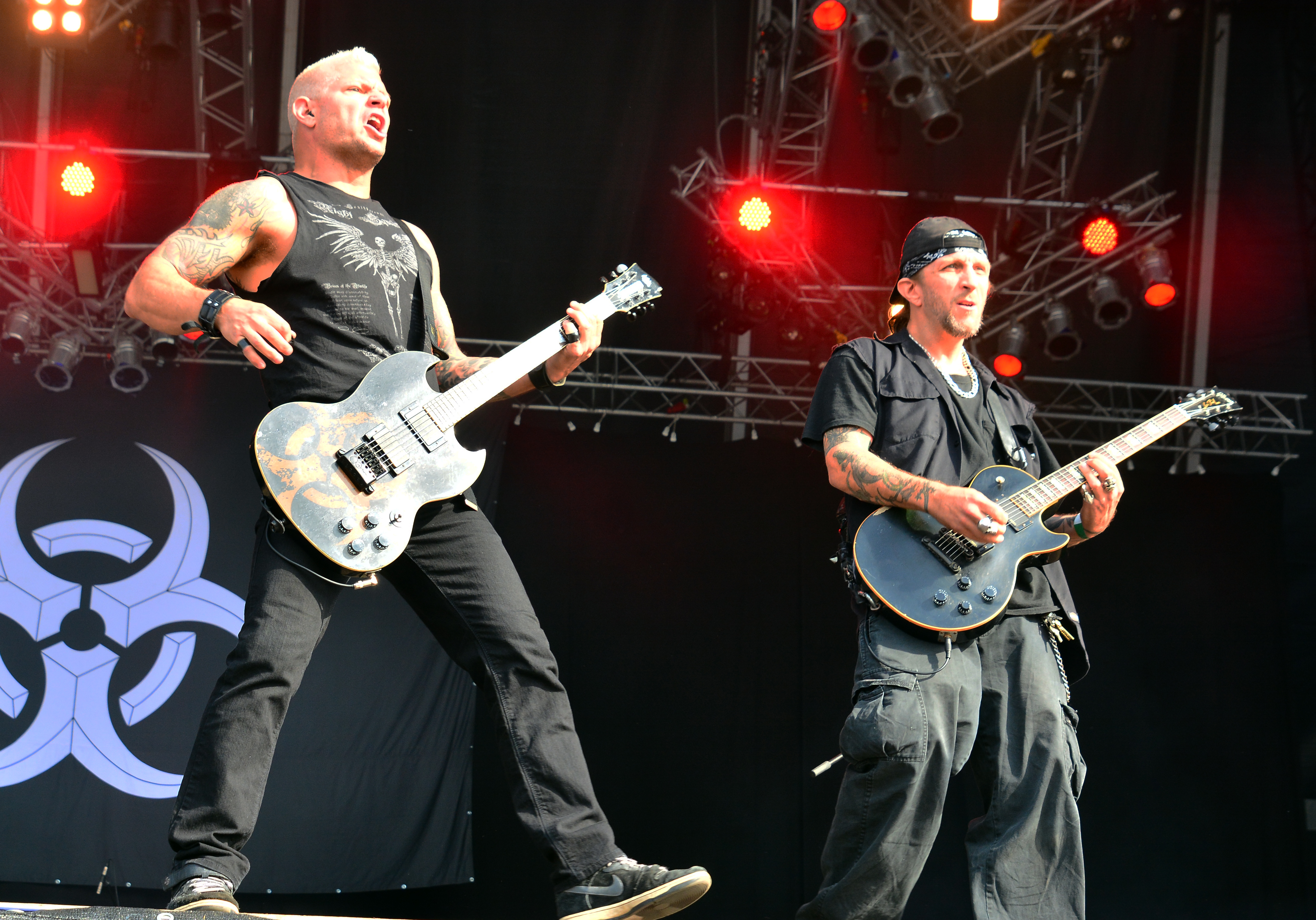
- Biohazard at Wacken Open Air 2015
- Studio albums: 9
- Live albums: 2
- Compilation albums: 1
- Singles: 15
- Music videos: 13
- Demo albums: 2

The discography of the American metal band Biohazard includes ten studio albums, two live albums, two demo albums, one compilation album, 15 singles, and 13 music videos.

== Studio albums ==
List of studio albums, with selected chart positions and sales figures
Title	Album details	Peak chart positions											Sales
Title	Album details	US	US Heat.	AUS	AUT	BEL (FL)	BEL (WA)	GER	NLD	SWE	SWI	UK	Sales
Biohazard	Released: June 30, 1990; Label: Maze Records	—	—	—	—	—	—	—	—	—	—	—	US: 40,000
Urban Discipline	Released: November 10, 1992; Label: Roadrunner	—	36	—	—	—	—	70	—	—	—	—	US: 135,000; WW: 1,000,000
State of the World Address	Released: May 24, 1994; Label: Warner Bros.	48	—	67	10	—	47	7	35	12	19	72	US: 198,790; WW: 1,000,000
Mata Leão	Released: June 25, 1996; Label: Warner Bros.	170	—	81	21	32	24	35	53	40	—	72	US: 51,408
New World Disorder	Released: June 8, 1999; Label: Mercury	187	—	—	—	—	—	40	—	—	—	105	US: 51,147; WW: 250,000
Uncivilization	Released: September 11, 2001; Label: Sanctuary/SPV	—	—	—	54	—	—	53	—	—	—	—	US: 20,663
Kill or Be Killed	Released: March 18, 2003; Label: Sanctuary/SPV	—	—	—	—	—	—	84	—	—	—	—	
Means to an End	Released: August 30, 2005; Label: SPV	—	—	—	—	—	—	—	—	—	—	—	
Reborn in Defiance	Released: January 20, 2012; Label: Nuclear Blast	—	—	—	—	98	—	80	—	—	—	—	
Divided We Fall	Released: October 17, 2025; Label: Black II Black	—	—	—	25	71	170	—	—	—	51	—	
"—" denotes a recording that did not chart or was not released in that territory.

== Live albums ==
Title	Album details	UK
No Holds Barred	Released: August 12, 1997; Label: Roadrunner	195
Live in San Francisco	Released: 2007; Label: 2b1	—

== Compilations ==
Year	Title	Label
2001	Tales from the B-Side	Orchard DK

== Demos ==
Year	Title
1988	Biohazard
1989	Infection Approaching

== Singles ==
List of singles, with selected chart positions and certifications, showing year released and album name
Title	Year	Peak chart positions	Album
Title	Year	UK	Album
"Punishment"	1992	—	Urban Discipline
"Judgment Night" (feat Onyx)	1993	—	Judgment Night
"Tales from the Hard Side"	1994	47	State of the World Address
"How It Is"	1994	62	State of the World Address
"Five Blocks to the Subway"	1994	—	State of the World Address
"After Forever"	1994	—	Nativity in Black
"Authority"	1996	—	Mata Leão
"A Lot to Learn"	1996	—	Mata Leão
"Resist"	1999	—	New World Disorder
"Switchback"	1999	—	New World Disorder
"End of My Rope"	1999	—	New World Disorder
"New World Disorder"	1999	—	New World Disorder
"Never Turn Your Back on Me"	2000	—	Non-album single (outtake from Uncivilization sessions)
"Sellout"	2001	—	Uncivilization^{[a]}
"Kill or Be Killed"	2003	—	Kill or Be Killed
"My Life, My Way"	2005	—	Means to an End
"Vengeance Is Mine"	2011	—	Reborn in Defiance
"—" denotes a recording that did not chart or was not released in that territory.

=== Featured singles ===
Song	Year	Album
Slam (remix) (Onyx feat. Biohazard)	1993	Non-album single

== Notes ==
a. ^{^} Released as a promotional-only single for radio and press; not issued as a commercial retail single.

== Music videos ==
- "Panic Attack" (1990)
- "Punishment" (1992)
- "Shades of Grey" (1992)
- "Slam (Bionyx Remix)" Onyx feat. Biohazard (1993)
- "Judgment Night" with Onyx (1993)
- "Tales from the Hard Side" (1994)
- "How It Is" (1994)
- "Five Blocks to the Subway" (1994)
- "After Forever" (Black Sabbath cover) (1995)
- "Authority" (1996)
- "A Lot to Learn" (1996)
- "Sellout" (2001)
- "Vengeance Is Mine" (2012)
