= Biohazard (disambiguation) =

A biohazard, or biological hazard, is a biological substance that poses a threat to the health of living organisms.

Biohazard may also refer to:

- Biohazard (band), an American band
  - Biohazard (1988 demo tape)
  - Biohazard (album), 1990
- Biohazard (book), a 1999 non-fiction book by Ken Alibek
- Biohazard (film), a 1985 science-fiction horror film
- BioHazard, a combat robot
- Resident Evil, known in Japan as Biohazard, a Japanese horror media franchise
  - Resident Evil (1996 video game), the first game in the series, known as Bio Hazard in Japan
  - Resident Evil (2002 video game), a remake of the above game, known as Biohazard in Japan
  - Resident Evil 7: Biohazard, a 2017 video game
- The pseudonym of Brian Swords, painter of Stay Up Late

== See also ==
- Bio-Hazard Battle, a 1992 video game
- Biohazzard Records, a German independent record label
