= Wrong Side of the Tracks =

Wrong Side of the Tracks may refer to:

== Television ==
- Wrong Side of the Tracks (TV series), a Spanish television series known in Spanish as Entrevías
- "Wrong Side of the Tracks", an episode of Happy Tree Friends
- "Wrong Side of the Tracks", an episode of American television series Boy Meets World

== Music ==
- "Wrong Side of the Tracks", a song recorded by Leroy Van Dyke
- "Wrong Side of the Tracks", a 2005 video by Johnny Hazzard
- "Wrong Side of the Tracks", a song by Biohazard from No Holds Barred
- "Wrong Side of the Tracks", a song by Strung Out from Suburban Teenage Wasteland Blues
- "Wrong Side of da Tracks", a song by Artifacts from Between a Rock and a Hard Place

== Other ==
- "Wrong Side of the Tracks", a mission in Grand Theft Auto: San Andreas
