= Powerflo =

American rap metal band

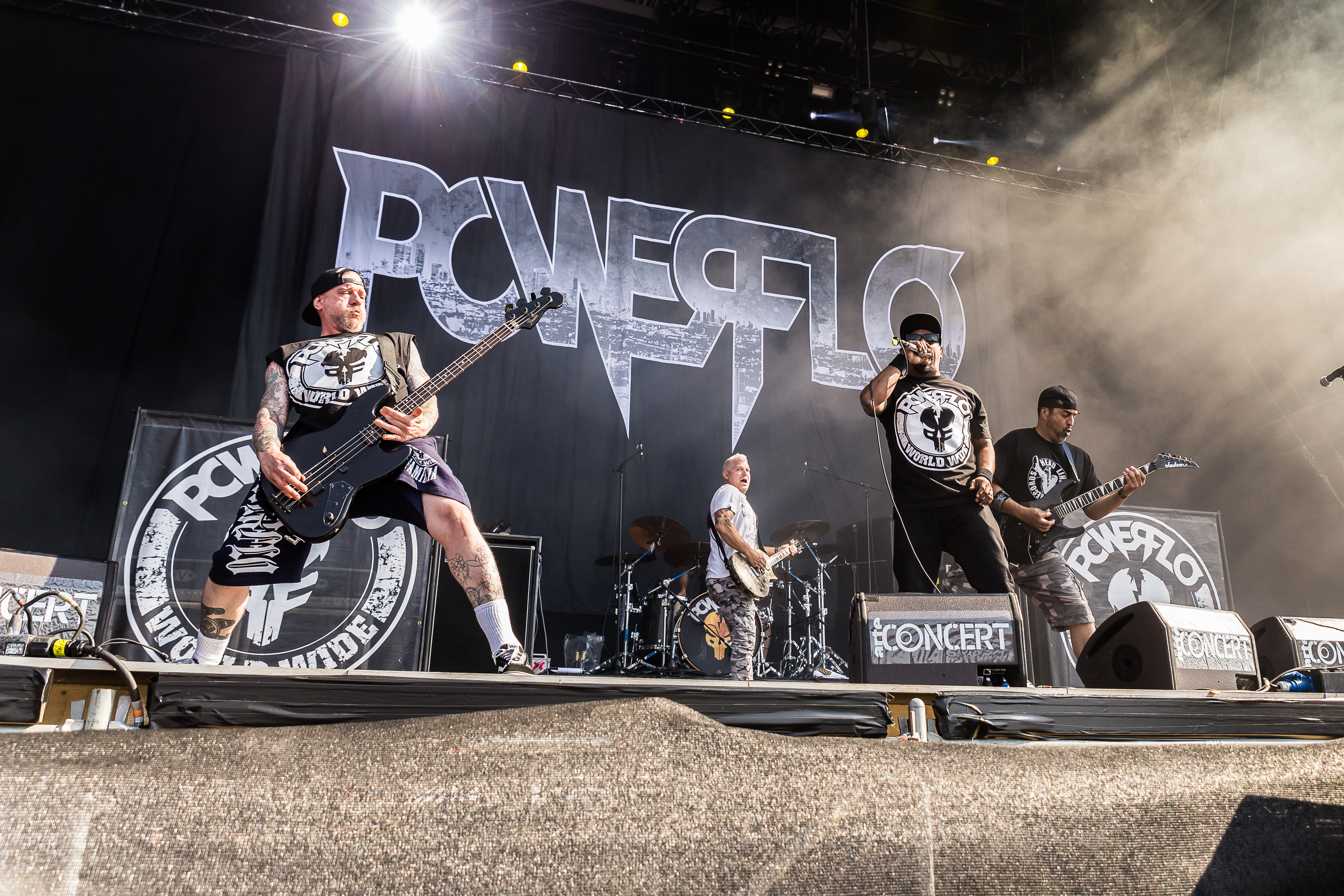
- Powerflo performing at With Full Force 2018

Background information
- Origin: Los Angeles, California, U.S.
- Genres: Rap metal; nu metal
- Years active: 2016–present
- Label: New Damage
- Members: Senen Reyes; Roy Lozano; Billy Graziadei; Christian Olde Wolbers
- Past members: Fernando Schaefer
- Website: powerflomusic.com

Powerflo is an American rap metal band from Los Angeles, formed in 2016. The band's current lineup consists of lead vocalist Senen Reyes (Cypress Hill), lead guitarist/backing vocalist Rogelio "Roy" Lozano (Downset.), rhythm guitarist/lead vocalist Billy Graziadei (Biohazard), bassist/backing vocalist Christian Olde Wolbers (Fear Factory), and drummer Fred Aching (Rio). Aching replaced original drummer Fernando Schaefer (Korzus) in 2018.

== History ==
The band's history can be traced back to the 1990s, where the band members would often collaborate – such as Senen "Sen Dog" Reyes and Billy Graziadei performing on Biohazard's State of the World Address album with the hit single "How It Is", or Christian Olde Wolbers and Roy Lozano appearing on the Cypress Hill albums Skull & Bones and Stoned Raiders. In 2015, Lozano played some demos to Senen Reyes on a ride to the airport, setting the foundations for Powerflo.

The name of the band comes from a comment Lozano made about Reyes's vocal tracking for the upcoming album. Describing their sound as a "cross between Iron Maiden, Black Sabbath and Cypress Hill", they first unveiled the band on March 1, 2017 while recording their self-titled debut album. On May 2, 2017, they released the first single "Resistance" via Metal Injection. In launching the first single, Reyes indicated that this is a longterm project and that future Powerflo albums will be released after their self-titled, produced by Billy Graziadei and Josh Lynch, is released, while also announcing a June 23 release date.

On June 2, 2017, Powerflo released their next music video (directed by Graziadei) for "Victims of Circumstance", a song influenced by the TV series The First 48. At the same time, they announced their first show at The Viper Room in Los Angeles on June 15. On May 31, "Resistance" was chosen as the official theme song for WWE NXT's programming.

In July 2017, Powerflo released another video for the single "Where I Stay" (directed by Jeremy Danger and Travis Shinn) which reached over 1 million views within weeks of release. The band spent the summer and fall touring with friends from San Diego P.O.D. and L.A. family Brujeria.

Powerflo released the next video for "Less than Human" (directed by Graziadei) in December 2017 and went on tour with Prong in the spring of 2018.

== Members ==
Powerflo live at With Full Force 2018

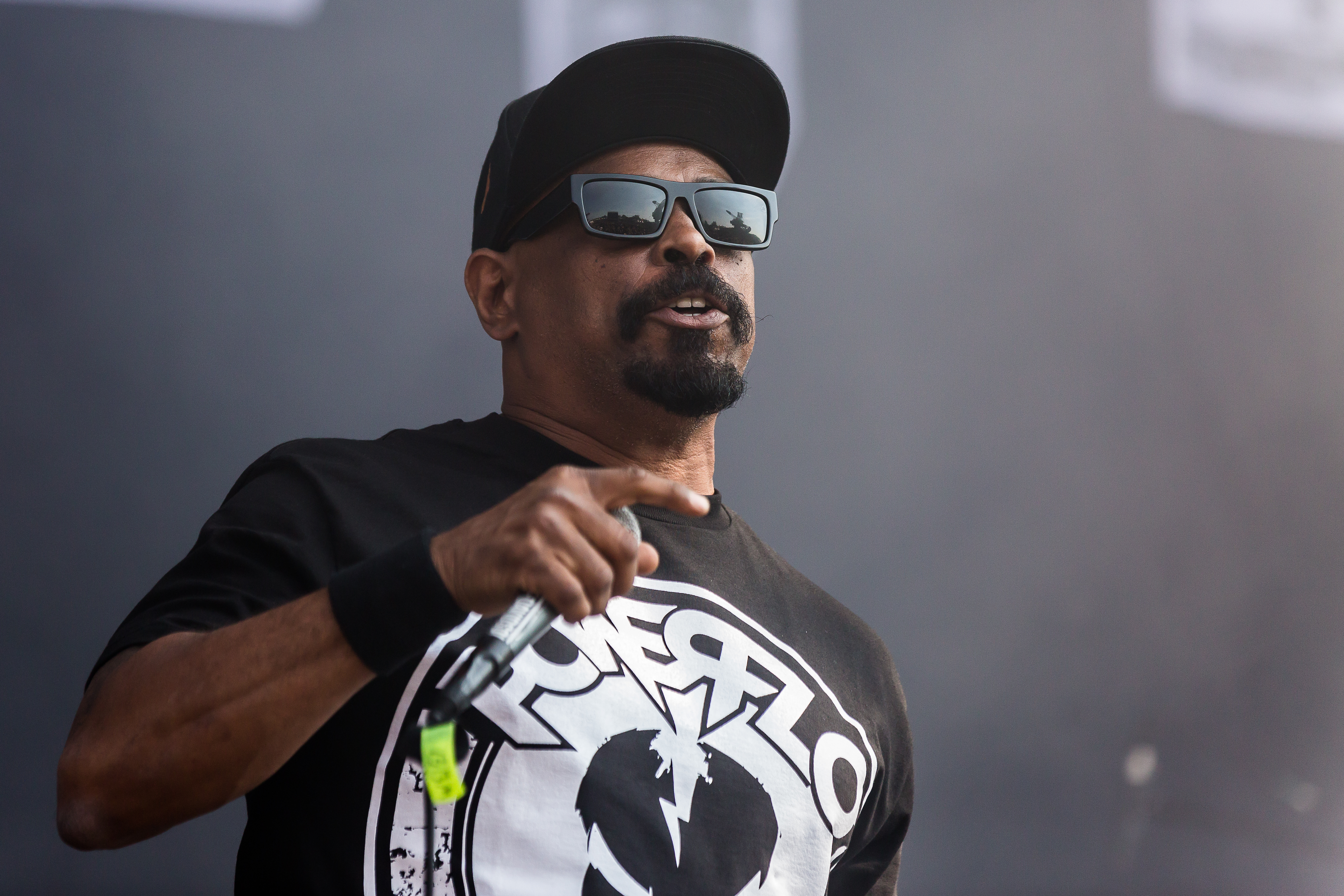
Senen Reyes

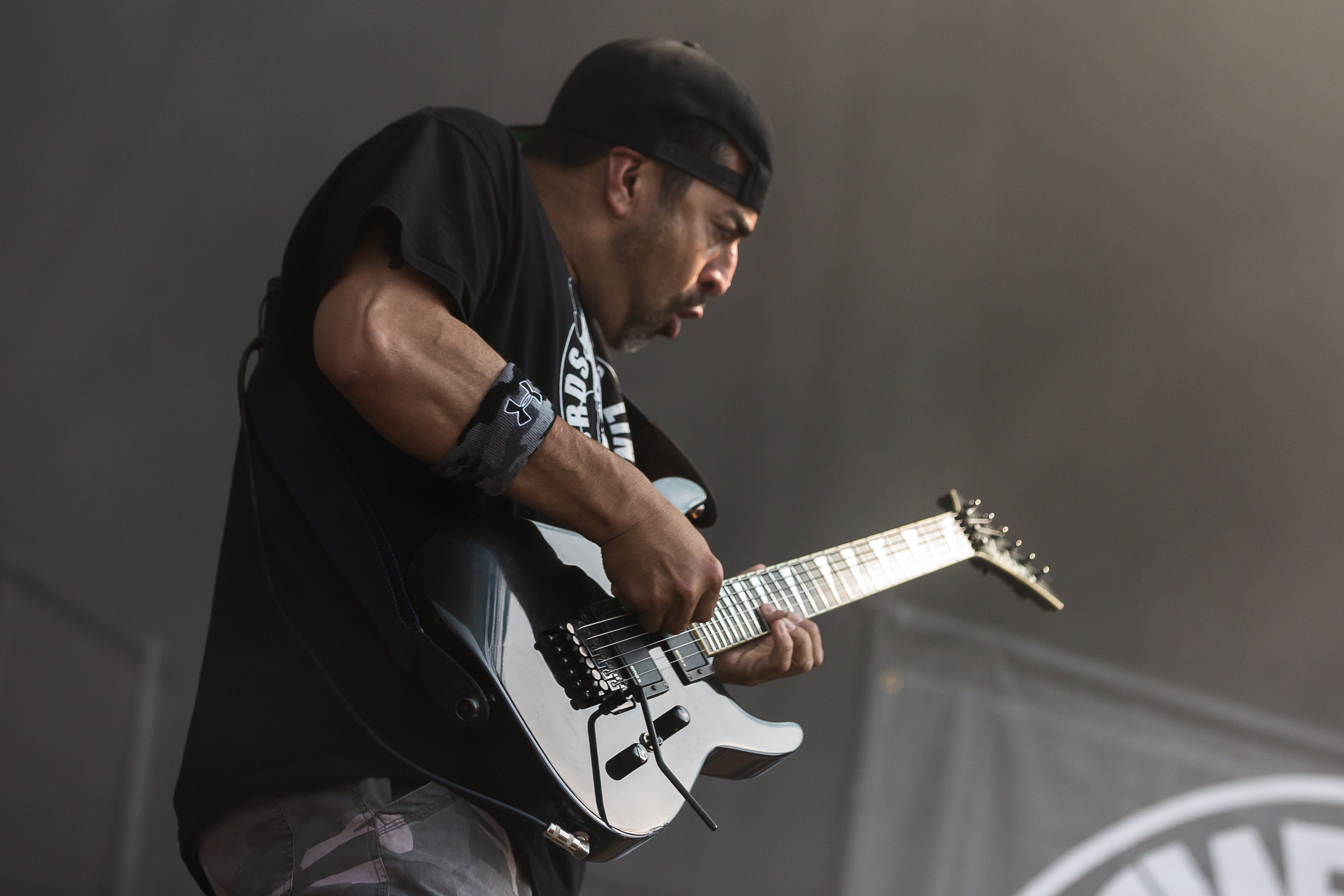
Roy Lozano

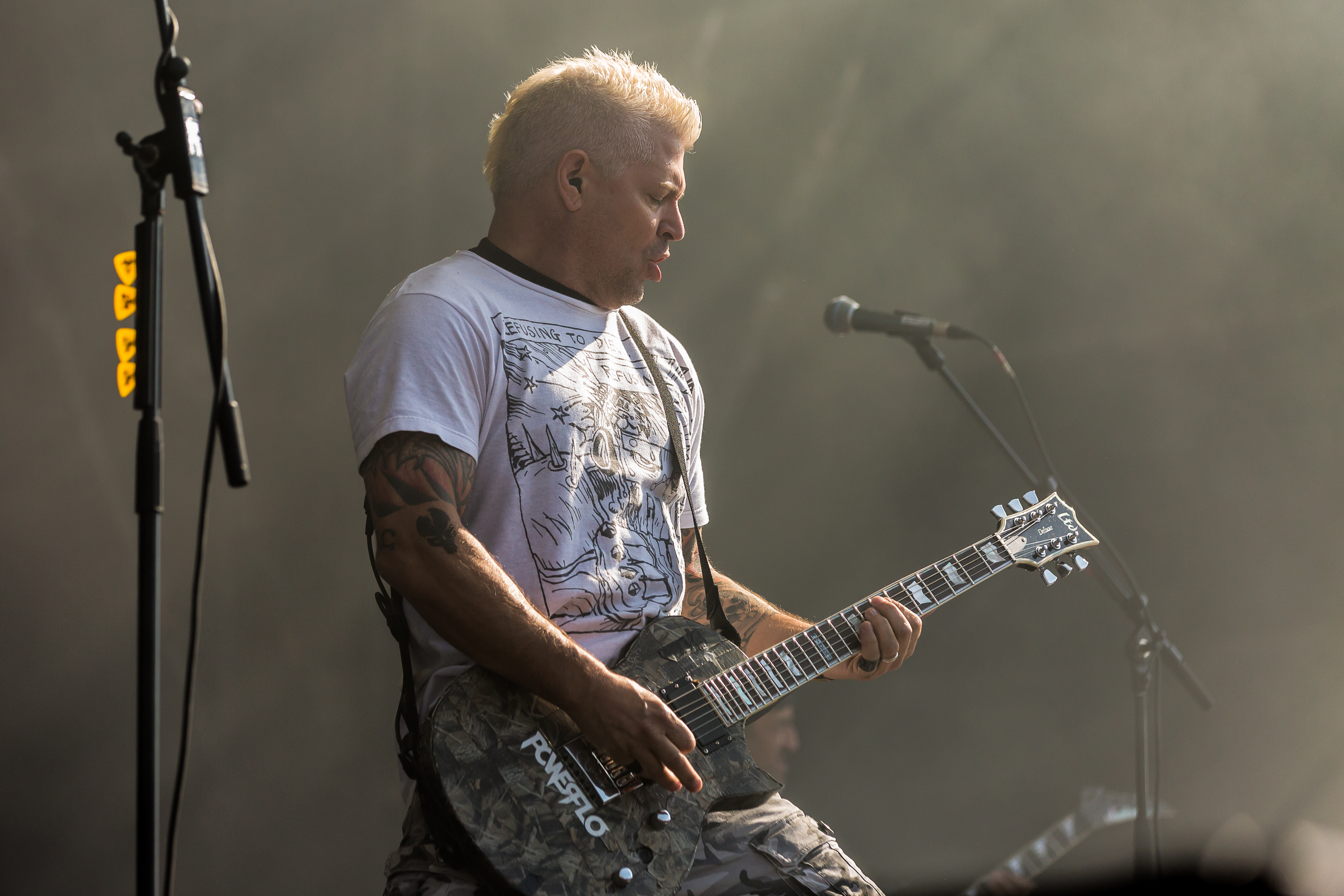
Billy Graziadei

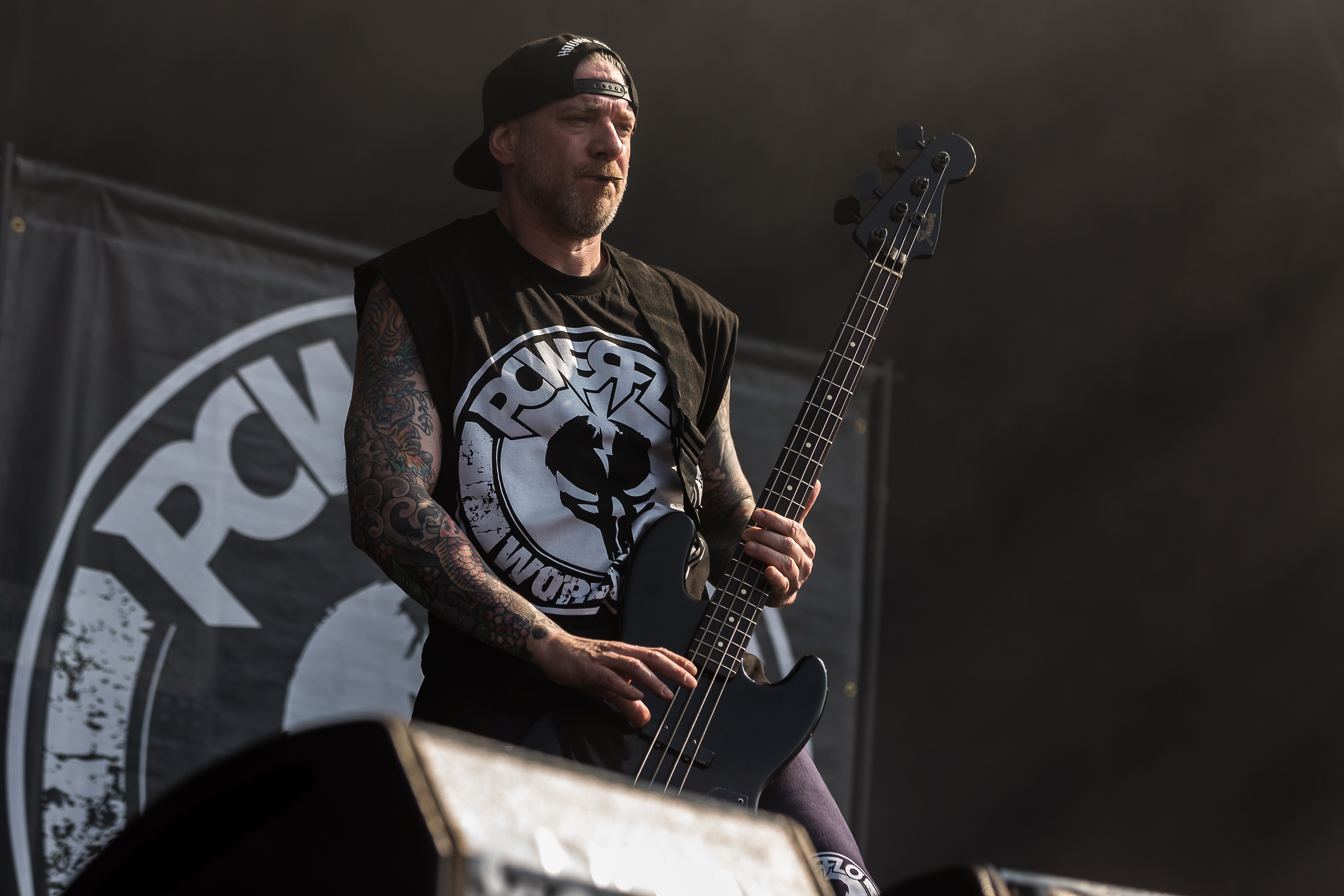
Christian Olde Wolbers

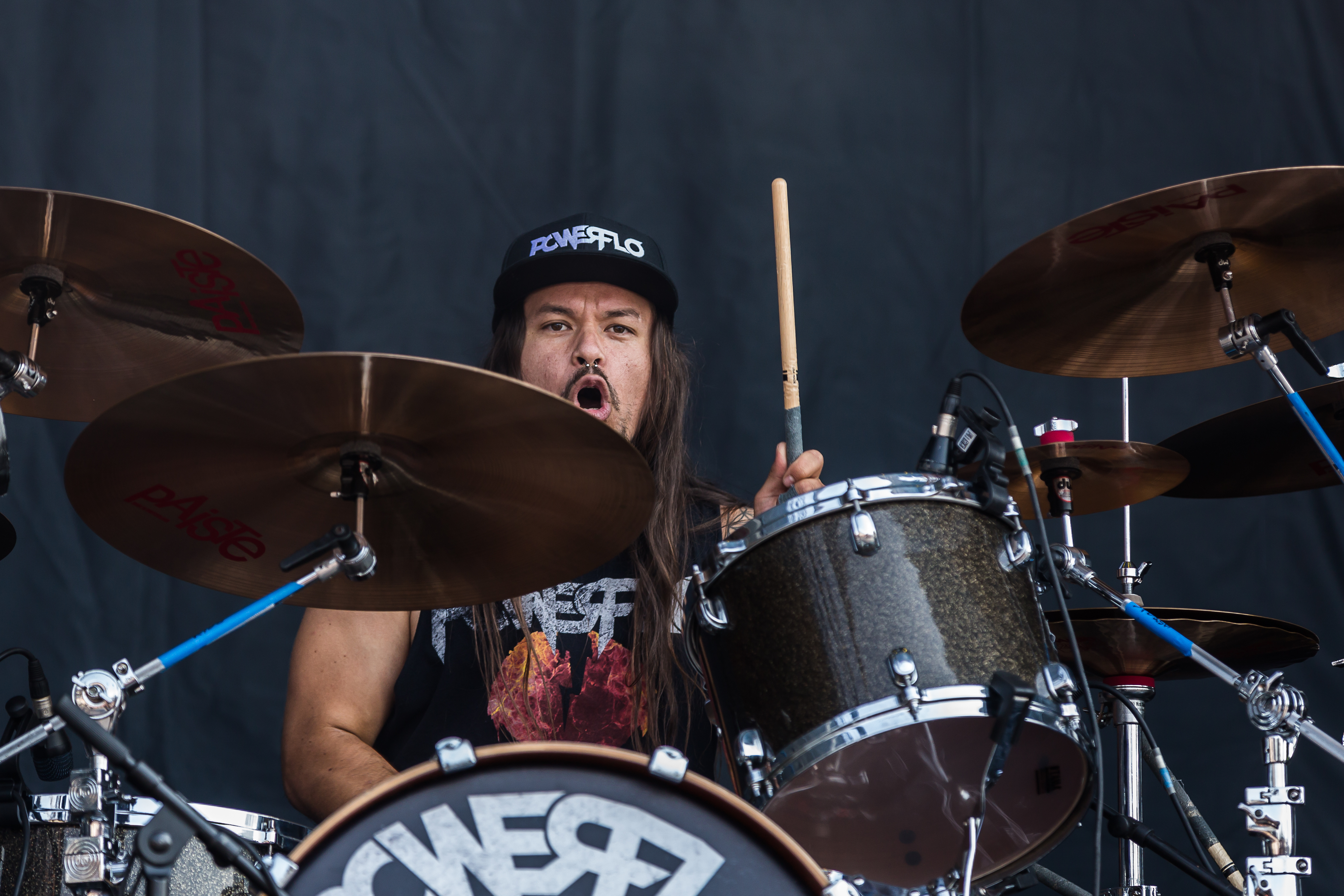
Fred Aching

Current members

- Senen Reyes – lead vocals (2016–present)
- Roy Lozano – lead guitar, backing vocals (2016–present)
- Billy Graziadei – rhythm guitar, co-lead vocals (2016–present)
- Christian Olde Wolbers – bass, backing vocals (2016–present)
- Fred Aching – drums (2018–present)

Former members

- Fernando Schaefer – drums (2016–2018)

== Discography ==
=== Albums ===
- Powerflo (2017)
- Gorilla Warfare (2024)

=== EPs ===
- Bring That Shit Back! (2018)
