= New World Disorder (album) =

Studio album by Biohazard
- Released: June 8, 1999
- Recorded: ??? – August 1998
- Studio: Right Track and Baby Monster (New York City); A&M Studios (Los Angeles)
- Genre: Hardcore punk; rap metal; groove metal
- Length: 53:37
- Label: Mercury
- Producer: Ed Stasium

Biohazard chronology
No Holds Barred (1997)	New World Disorder (1999)	Tales from the B-Side (2001)

Singles from New World Disorder
- 1. "Resist" Released: 1999; 2. "Switchback" Released: 1999; 3. "End of My Rope" Released: 1999; 4. "New World Disorder" Released: 1999

Professional ratings
Review scores
Source	Rating
AllMusic	3/5 stars
Collector's Guide to Heavy Metal	6/10
Entertainment Weekly	C+
NME	2/10
Q	3/5 stars
Rock Hard	8.5/10

New World Disorder is the fifth studio album by American hardcore punk band Biohazard, released on June 8, 1999 by Mercury Records. It is the only record Biohazard released on Mercury, their last major-label album to date. It is the only Biohazard studio release to feature former Helmet guitarist Rob Echiverria. It was produced by Ed Stasium, who previously produced State of the World Address.

It features guest appearances from Sticky Fingaz, Christian Olde Wolbers, and Igor Cavalera.

== Commercial performance ==
New World Disorder has been considered a commercial disaster for the band. The album charted at number 187 on the Billboard 200 chart. By January 2000, the album had sold 40,000 copies in the US, and by May 2002 had sold 51,408 copies in the US according to Nielsen Soundscan. In January 2000, Evan Seinfeld claimed that the album had sold 250,000 copies worldwide.

Following the poor sales of the album, Biohazard left Mercury Records in late 1999. Since then, band has been hostile to questions about their record deal with Mercury; Evan Seinfeld said that Mercury had "slipped" with the album's promotion as the reason the band left the label. When asked about the record deal in 2018, Echeverria said "no comment".

== Track listing ==
No.	Title	Length
1.	"Resist"	2:43
2.	"Switchback"	3:33
3.	"Salvation"	3:55
4.	"End of My Rope"	3:43
5.	"All for None"	3:51
6.	"Breakdown"	2:52
7.	"Inner Fear On"	3:27
8.	"Abandon in Place"	3:45
9.	"Skin"	3:28
10.	"Camouflage"	2:48
11.	"Decline"	3:43
12.	"Cycle of Abuse"	4:52
13.	"Dogs of War"	4:13
14.	"New World Disorder" (feat. Sticky Fingaz, Christian Olde Wolbers, and Igor Cavalera)	6:44
Total length:		53:37

== Personnel ==
- Evan Seinfeld – bass, lead vocals
- Billy Graziadei – guitars, lead vocals
- Rob Echeverria – lead guitar
- Danny Schuler – drums

== Charts ==
Chart (1999)	Peak position
U.S. Billboard 200	187
German Albums Chart	40
