= Suicide City =

American punk rock band

- Origin: New York City, U.S.
- Genres: Punk rock; hardcore punk; horror punk; industrial rock
- Years active: 2005–present
- Label: The End Records
- Members: Karl Bernholtz; AJ Marchetta; Jennifer Arroyo; Danny Lamagna
- Past members: Billy Graziadei

Suicide City is an American punk rock band from Brooklyn, New York City, founded in 2005. The band's original lineup consisted of lead vocalist Karl Bernholtz, rhythm guitarist Billy Graziadei, lead guitarist AJ Marchetta, bassist Jennifer Arroyo, and drummer Danny Lamagna.

== History ==
The group began when producer/guitarist Billy Graziadei sent some songs to singer Karl Bernholtz after working with him on his band The Groovnicks. The two quickly got on and brought in guitarist AJ Marchetta and drummer Danny Lamagna. Bassist Jennifer Arroyo soon joined the group to round out Suicide City. They self-released the EP Not My Year in 2005, selling 7,000 copies without label support. They also self-produced and released a live DVD entitled Live from CBGB.

On August 4, 2009, Suicide City released their debut full-length effort, Frenzy, via Brooklyn label The End Records. Benholtz described it as follows: "Suicide City thrives on making people happy and smile through our music without having to candy coat anything. Life does not 'suck and then you die.' Life is great, dangerous, exciting, strange, and then you die. I guess that's what we're trying to portray with our music." Graziadei soon after left Suicide City to focus on his band Biohazard.

In 2011, after a one-year hiatus, the band returned as a four-piece consisting of Bernholtz, Lamagna, Marchetta and Arroyo.

=== Touring ===
The band has made numerous trips around the United States while touring with Mindless Self Indulgence, Gwar, Otep, Life of Agony, Taking Back Sunday, and Glenn Danzig.

The band toured Brazil with MxPx and co-headlined the Maquinaria Rock Fest alongside Sepultura, the Misfits, and Suicidal Tendencies on May 18, 2008. In November 2008, Live from CBGB was released featuring Suicide City's performance at CBGB, filmed shortly before the venue's closure. Suicide City signed to The End Records in the summer of 2009.

Suicide City played their last live show February 11, 2010, before going on a hiatus. Exactly one year later, on February 11, 2011, the band reunited, with the exception of Graziadei, to perform at the Highline Ballroom in New York City.

== Band members ==
Current members

- Karl Bernholtz – lead vocals, rhythm guitar (2005–present)
- AJ Marchetta – lead guitar, backing vocals (2005–present)
- Jennifer Arroyo – bass (2005–present)
- Danny Lamagna – drums, percussion (2005–present)

Former members

- Billy Graziadei – rhythm guitar, backing vocals (2005–2011)

== Discography ==
- Not My Year (EP) (2005)
- Frenzy (2009)

=== Videos ===
- Live from CBGB DVD (2008)

== Other work ==
Suicide City was featured on the "More and Faster" mix of Mindless Self Indulgence's "Straight to Video", which appears on that band's "Shut Me Up" single.
