= Urban Discipline =

Studio album by Biohazard
- Released: November 10, 1992
- Recorded: May–June 1992
- Studio: Fun City Studios (New York City)
- Genres: Hardcore punk; rap metal; groove metal
- Length: 56:46
- Label: Roadrunner
- Producers: Wharton Tiers, Biohazard

Biohazard chronology
Biohazard (1990)	Urban Discipline (1992)	State of the World Address (1994)

Urban Discipline is the second studio album by American hardcore band Biohazard, released on November 10, 1992 by Roadrunner Records. A remastered edition featuring bonus tracks was released in 1998.

The intro to the song "Punishment" is from the 1989 superhero film The Punisher starring Dolph Lundgren.

== Background ==
Prior to the release of Urban Discipline Biohazard had been signed to a local Staten Island based label Maze Records who they had a seven album deal with. However following the release of their self titled debut album the band was no longer getting attention from the label. So they hired a lawyer who negotiated with the label to get the band off their contract for $15,000. Following this the band had no record deal waiting for them so they went on a self financed US tour with The Exploited. It was during this tour they began playing four songs that would eventually appear on Urban Discipline those being "Urban Discipline", "Punishment", "Shades of Grey", "Black and White" and "Red All Over." It was when they returned from this tour they landed a deal from Roadrunner Records.

Biohazard recorded Urban Discipline in May and June 1992 at Fun City Studios in New York. Throughout the album vocals are traded off between bassist Evan Seinfeld and rhythm guitarist Billy Graziadei.

According to Billy Graziadei, an early version of "Five Blocks to the Subway" was written and recorded during the Urban Discipline sessions but was held back, as the band felt it was not ready for release. The track was later reworked and appeared on their third album, State of the World Address (1994).

Music videos were made for both "Punishment" and "Shades of Gray" which both received significant playtime on MTV’s Headbangers Ball. The video for "Punishment" would go on to become the most played video on the history of the program.

A remastered edition of the album was issued in 1998 with four demo tracks. In 2022, a 30th-anniversary double-LP reissue was released by Run Out Groove, featuring the same four demos ("Business", "Urban Discipline", "Loss", and "Black and White and Red All Over") but not "Five Blocks to the Subway", which has never been officially released in its Urban Discipline form.

== Commercial performance ==
Commercially Urban Discipline became the bands first album to chart in multiple countries such as Germany, Hungary along with the US Heatseekers chart. By 1994, the album had sold 135,000 copies in the US , and eventually went on to sell over 1 million copies worldwide.

== Critical reception ==
Professional ratings
Review scores
Source	Rating
AllMusic	4.5/5 stars
Collector's Guide to Heavy Metal	6/10
Kerrang!	4/5 stars
laut.de	5/5 stars
Metal Hammer	4/5
Rock Hard	9.5/10
Select	2/5 stars

Kieran McCarthy of AllMusic wrote "They're technically competent enough to implement light crescendos and decrescendos, tempo variation, and a diffuse focus of the instruments within the band. It's not Mozart, but it is one of the most authentic combinations of thrash and rap ever made."

In 2005, Urban Discipline was ranked number 277 in Rock Hard magazine's book The 500 Greatest Rock & Metal Albums of All Time. In 2013, The Village Voice ranked the album at number 20 on its list of the "Top 20 New York Hardcore and Metal Albums of All Time".

In 2025, the album was inducted into the Decibel Hall of Fame. The publication added "It was an album boiled by and boiling in palpable acrimony that connected with people around the globe equally outraged by their own environments, defeats and struggles. This connection opened Biohazard to more of the world than they ever imagined as the victories piled up. They toured relentlessly to meet the demand created by becoming mainstays on MTV specialty programs."

== Track listing ==
All tracks are written by Biohazard, unless otherwise noted.

No.	Title	Writer(s)	Length
1.	"Chamber Spins Three"		3:41
2.	"Punishment"		4:44
3.	"Shades of Grey"		3:27
4.	"Business"		4:04
5.	"Black and White and Red All Over"		4:04
6.	"Man with a Promise"		3:20
7.	"Disease"		4:01
8.	"Urban Discipline"		5:34
9.	"Loss"		5:20
10.	"Wrong Side of the Tracks"		3:37
11.	"Mistaken Identity"	Biohazard, Mick Devitt	4:32
12.	"We're Only Gonna Die (From Our Own Arrogance)" (Bad Religion cover)	Greg Graffin	2:19
13.	"Tears of Blood"		4:52
14.	"Hold My Own"		2:51
Total length:			56:46

Limited edition digipak bonus tracks
No.	Title	Length
15.	"Shades of Grey" (Live)	4:13
16.	"Punishment" (Live)	5:14
Total length:		66:13

1998 remastered edition bonus tracks
No.	Title	Length
15.	"Business" (Demo)	4:23
16.	"Urban Discipline" (Demo)	5:32
17.	"Loss" (Demo)	4:39
18.	"Black and White and Red All Over" (Demo)	4:00
Total length:		75:20

== Personnel ==
Biohazard

- Evan Seinfeld – lead vocals, bass
- Billy Graziadei – lead vocals, rhythm guitar
- Bobby Hambel – lead guitar, backing vocals
- Danny Schuler – drums

Additional personnel

- Executive producer: Lyor Cohen
- Produced by Wharton Tiers & Biohazard
- Mixed by Steven Ett & Biohazard
- Mastering: George Marino
- Art director: Mitchell Trupia

== Charts ==
Chart (1992)	Peak position
U.S. Billboard Top Heatseekers	36
German Albums Chart	70
Hungarian Albums (MAHASZ)	37
