= Danny Lamagna =

American drummer

- Lamagna performing with Agnostic Front in 2024

Background information
- Genres: Hardcore punk, crossover thrash, punk rock
- Occupation: Drummer
- Member of: Agnostic Front, Suicide City
- Formerly of: Sworn Enemy
- Website: danlamagna.com

Danny Lamagna is an American musician who is the drummer for the punk/hardcore bands Agnostic Front and Suicide City and formerly Sworn Enemy.

== History ==
=== Suicide City ===
In 2004, Lamagna started Suicide City with Groovenics singer Karl Bernholtz, Groovenics/Ghost Fight guitarist A. J. Marchetta, Kittie bassist Jennifer Arroyo, and Biohazard vocalist Billy Graziadei.

=== Sworn Enemy ===
In 2010, vocalist Sal Lococo, bassist Jamin Hunt, and guitarists Lorenzo Antonucci and Jeff Cummings of hardcore band Sworn Enemy brought Lamagna in to perform drums with the ensemble.

=== Agnostic Front ===
In 2022, Agnostic Front revealed that Lamagna would be their new drummer after Pokey Mo's departure in 2020.
