= Mata Leão =

Studio album by Biohazard
- Released: June 25, 1996
- Recorded: 1995–1996
- Studios: Eldorado Recording (Burbank, California)
- Genres: Hardcore punk; rap metal; groove metal
- Length: 38:23
- Label: Warner Bros.
- Producers: Dave Jerden, Biohazard

Biohazard chronology
State of the World Address (1994)	Mata Leão (1996)	No Holds Barred (1997)

Singles from Mata Leão
- 1. "Authority" Released: 1995; 2. "A Lot to Learn" Released: 1996

Professional ratings
Review scores
Source	Rating
AllMusic	4/5 stars
Chicago Tribune	3/4 stars
Collector's Guide to Heavy Metal	8/10
The Encyclopedia of Popular Music	2/5 stars
Entertainment Weekly	D
Kerrang!	3/5 stars
NME	4/10
Rock Hard	9.5/10
Spin	5/10
Vox	5/10

Mata Leão is the fourth studio album by American hardcore punk band Biohazard, released on June 25, 1996, by Warner Bros. Records, their second and final album for the label. Upon release, it charted at No. 170 on the Billboard 200, charting over 100 places lower than its predecessor, State of the World Address (which charted at No. 48), and was a commercial failure, leading Warner Bros. to drop the band from the label. Music videos for "Authority" and "A Lot to Learn" were released to promote the album.

The album was produced by Dave Jerden, best known for producing albums by Alice in Chains and Jane's Addiction. It was recorded by the band as a three-piece following the departure of guitarist Bobby Hambel in 1995. During the touring cycle for the album, former Helmet guitarist Rob Echeverria stepped in his place.

The title comes from "mata-leão", which is the rear naked choke's Portuguese name, used in Brazilian Jiu-Jitsu, literally meaning "lion-killer".

The album was released on vinyl, cassette and CD. Some versions of the CD came with an O-Card.

== Track listing ==
No.	Title	Length
1.	"Authority"	2:14
2.	"These Eyes (Have Seen)"	2:39
3.	"Stigmatized"	1:51
4.	"Control"	2:50
5.	"Cleansing"	3:25
6.	"Competition"	1:49
7.	"Modern Democracy"	2:26
8.	"Better Days"	1:49
9.	"Gravity"	2:39
10.	"A Lot to Learn"	1:29
11.	"Waiting to Die"	3:06
12.	"A Way"	2:05
13.	"True Strengths"	2:34
14.	"Thorn"	3:20
15.	"In Vain"	4:04
Total length:		38:23

== Charts ==
Chart	Peak position
US Billboard 200	170
Australian Albums (ARIA Charts)	80
Austrian Albums Chart	21
Dutch Albums Chart	53
German Albums Chart	35
Swedish Albums Chart	40
UK Albums Chart	72

== Personnel ==
- Evan Seinfeld – bass, vocals
- Billy Graziadei – lead and rhythm guitar, vocals
- DJ Lethal – turntables
- Danny Schuler – drums, percussion
