= Kill or Be Killed (Biohazard album) =

Studio album by Biohazard
- Released: March 18, 2003
- Recorded: July 18–31, 2002
- Studio: Pie Studios: (Glen Cove, New York); Ratpiss Studios (Brooklyn, New York)
- Genre: Hardcore punk; nu metal
- Length: 36:35
- Label: Sanctuary
- Producer: Biohazard

Biohazard chronology
Uncivilization (2001)	Kill or Be Killed (2003)	Means to an End (2005)

Professional ratings
Review scores
Source	Rating
AllMusic	2/5 stars
Collector's Guide to Heavy Metal	5/10

Kill or Be Killed is the seventh studio album by American hardcore punk band Biohazard. It features new guitarist Carmine Vincent, formerly of Nucleus, who had replaced Leo Curley.

It was noted as return to the traditional style of Biohazard after the more experimental style of the previous album, Uncivilization.

== Track listing ==
No.	Title	Length
1.	"Intro"	0:26
2.	"World on Fire"	2:34
3.	"Never Forgive, Never Forget"	4:13
4.	"Kill or Be Killed"	2:39
5.	"Heads Kicked In"	4:38
6.	"Beaten Senseless"	2:08
7.	"Make My Stand"	2:37
8.	"Open Your Eyes"	3:15
9.	"Penalty"	3:01
10.	"Dead to Me"	4:04
11.	"Hallowed Ground"	6:55

- The track listing on the album's back cover is incorrect. It incorrectly lists the songs in this order:
- Some CDs are only the 10 tracks listed below. Confirmed with ripping software. Sanctuary Records BG2 84563, EMI Canada, distributed by Columbia House. Sleeves could potentially have gone on the wrong CDs that have 11 tracks.

No.	Title	Length
1.	"Never Forgive, Never Forget"	4:14
2.	"Kill or Be Killed"	2:39
3.	"Heads Kicked In"	4:38
4.	"Beaten Senseless"	2:08
5.	"Make My Stand"	2:37
6.	"Open Your Eyes"	3:15
7.	"Penalty"	3:00
8.	"World on Fire"	3:00
9.	"Dead to Me"	4:05
10.	"Hallowed Ground"	6:57

== Personnel ==
- Billy Graziadei: lead vocals, guitars
- Evan Seinfeld: vocals, bass
- Carmine Vincent: guitars
- Danny Schuler: drums

Production

- Produced by Billy Graziadei and Danny Schuler
- Engineer: Pete DeBoer
- Mixing: Billy Graziadei, Danny Schuler and Pete DeBoer
