= Powerflo (album) =

Studio album by Powerflo
- Released: June 23, 2017
- Recorded: 2017
- Studios: NRG Studios (North Hollywood); Firewater Studios (Los Angeles)
- Genres: Rap metal; nu metal
- Length: 34:36
- Label: New Damage Records
- Producers: Billy Graziadei; Josh Lynch

Powerflo chronology
Powerflo (2017)	Gorilla Warfare (2024)

Singles from Powerflo
- 1. "Resistance" Released: May 2017; 2. "Victim of Circumstance" Released: June 2, 2017; 3. "Where I Stay" Released: July 12, 2017

Professional ratings
Review scores
Source	Rating
Exclaim!	5/10
Metal Hammer	2.5/5 stars
Punknews.org	3/5 stars
Sputnikmusic	4/5

Powerflo is the debut studio album by American heavy metal band Powerflo. It was released on June 23, 2017 via New Damage Records. Recording sessions took place at NRG Studios and at Firewater Studios in Los Angeles. Production was handled by Josh Lynch and member Billy Graziadei, with Roy Lozano serving as executive producer. It peaked at number 17 on the US Billboard Heatseekers Albums chart.

== Track listing ==
No.	Title	Length
1.	"My M.O."	3:23
2.	"Resistance"	3:26
3.	"Where I Stay"	3:26
4.	"Crushing That"	3:19
5.	"Less Than a Human"	2:53
6.	"The Grind"	3:19
7.	"Victim of Circumstance"	2:42
8.	"Made It This Way"	2:46
9.	"Finish the Game"	2:43
10.	"Up and Out of Me"	3:13
11.	"Start a War"	3:26
Total length:		34:36

== Personnel ==
Powerflo

- Senen "Sen Dog" Reyes – lead vocals
- Rogelio "Roy" Lozano – lead guitar, backing vocals, executive producer
- Billy Graziadei – rhythm guitar, backing vocals, producer
- Christian Olde Wolbers – bass, backing vocals
- Fernando Schaefer – drums, percussion

Additional

- Josh Lynch – producer
- Jay Baumgardner – mixing
- Maor Appelbaum – mastering
- Filip Horsch – artwork, logo, package layout
- Deborah J. Klein – management

== Charts ==
Chart (2017)	Peak position
US Heatseekers Albums (Billboard)	17
