= Reborn in Defiance =

Studio album by Biohazard
- Released: January 20, 2012
- Studio: Firewater Studios (Los Angeles, California): Ocean Studios (Burbank, California)
- Genres: Hardcore punk; rap metal; groove metal
- Label: Nuclear Blast
- Producer: Toby Wright

Biohazard chronology
Means to an End (2005)	Reborn in Defiance (2012)	Divided We Fall (2025)

Professional ratings
Review scores
Source	Rating
SputnikMusic	2.5/5 stars
Thrash Hits	3.5/6 stars

Reborn in Defiance is the ninth studio album by American hardcore punk band Biohazard. It was the first album since 1994's State of the World Address to feature the original recording line-up, after Bobby Hambel's return to the band in 2008. Founding member and vocalist/bassist Evan Seinfeld left the band in June 2011 shortly after the album was recorded, though he returned to the band in October 2022.

The album was released worldwide, with the exception of North America, on January 20, 2012, through Nuclear Blast. The band originally planned to offer a digital edition of the album as a free download for American fans on the same date but these plans were canceled at the last moment.

== Critical reception ==
In a review at SputnikMusic, the site wrote: "Following the vein of Means to End, Reborn in Defiance is a heavy, chunky record, but nothing new for Biohazard. A very solid album, with some enjoyable groove orientated riffs, displaying the essence of their music since their early beginnings as one of the progenitors of rap metal, or nu-metal, Reborn in Defiance has some variance, with tracks such as Killing Me standing out with its clean intro. However, there are a lot of very stagnant guitar parts, mainly the choruses, and some of the verses."

== Track list ==
All tracks are written by Biohazard.

No.	Title	Length
1.	"9:IIIX6.941"	0:54
2.	"Vengeance Is Mine"	3:24
3.	"Decay"	4:24
4.	"Reborn"	4:52
5.	"Killing Me"	4:49
6.	"Countdown Doom"	4:56
7.	"Come Alive"	3:48
8.	"Vows of Redemption"	4:56
9.	"Waste Away"	4:24
10.	"You Were Wrong"	6:05
11.	"Skullcrusher"	4:14
12.	"Never Give In"	3:57
13.	"Season the Sky"	4:14
Total length:		54:57

== Personnel ==
- Evan Seinfeld – bass, lead vocals
- Billy Graziadei – rhythm guitar, co-lead vocals
- Bobby Hambel – lead guitar
- Danny Schuler – drums

== Charts ==
Chart performance for Reborn in Defiance
Chart (2012)	Peak position
Belgian Albums (Ultratop Flanders)	98
German Albums (Offizielle Top 100)	80
