= Means to an End =

Studio album by Biohazard
- Released: August 30, 2005
- Studio: Underground Sound Studios (South Amboy, New Jersey)
- Genres: Hardcore punk; rap metal; groove metal
- Length: 34:05
- Label: SPV/Steamhammer
- Producers: Billy Graziadei, Scott Roberts, Danny Schuler

Biohazard chronology
Kill or Be Killed (2003)	Means to an End (2005)	Reborn in Defiance (2012)

Professional ratings
Review scores
Source	Rating
AllMusic	3.5/5 stars
Collector's Guide to Heavy Metal	5/10

Means to an End is the eighth studio album by American hardcore punk band Biohazard. Guitarist Scott Roberts, formerly of the Cro-Mags and the Spudmonsters, is featured on this album having replaced Carmine Vincent during Biohazard's previous tour schedules.

== Recording ==
The band initially wrote and recorded the material for Means to an End in early 2004. During the mixing process, a studio disaster resulted in the loss of the recordings, and the album had to be completely re-recorded before its release in August 2005. Graziadei later recalled, "we wrote and recorded what became Means to an End in early 2004… while we were mixing the album disaster struck and we lost EVERYTHING. We had to go back in and eventually turn a horrible situation into a miracle."

== Track listing ==
No.	Title	Length
1.	"My Life, My Way"	4:13
2.	"The Fire Burns Inside"	2:17
3.	"Killing to Be Free"	4:24
4.	"Filled with Hate"	3:09
5.	"Devotion"	3:17
6.	"Break It Away from Me"	3:07
7.	"Kings Never Die"	2:52
8.	"Don't Stand Alone"	3:53
9.	"To the Grave"	2:55
10.	"Set Me Free"	3:38

== Personnel ==
- Evan Seinfeld: vocals, bass
- Billy Graziadei: vocals, guitars
- Scott Roberts: guitars
- Danny Schuler: drums, percussion

=== Production ===
- Produced and engineered by Billy Graziadei, Scott Roberts and Danny Schuler
- Assistants: Joe Pucciarelli, Mike Turner
- Mixed and mastered by Ed Stasium
