= Divided We Fall (Biohazard album) =

Studio album by Biohazard
- Released: October 17, 2025
- Studios: Shorefire (Long Branch); The Hydeaway (Van Nuys); Firewater (Los Angeles)
- Length: 38:08
- Label: BlkIIBlk
- Producer: Matt Hyde

Biohazard chronology
Reborn in Defiance (2012)	Divided We Fall (2025)

Divided We Fall is the tenth studio album by American hardcore punk band Biohazard. The work was produced by Matt Hyde and released on October 17, 2025.

== Background ==
In October 2022, it was reported that Biohazard would reunite with the “classic” lineup of Seinfeld, Graziadei, Hambel, and Schuler. Seinfeld credited a chance encounter with Schuler's brother as inspiration to reconnect with his former bandmates. On August 14, 2023, it was announced the group had officially begun working on new material.

In October of 2024, Frontiers Music unveiled a new imprint, BlkIIBlk Records, and Biohazard were announced as the labels first signing along with an announcement their 10th studio album would be released sometime in 2025. In December of that year it was reported the band were back in the studio working on the album.

Divided We Fall was produced, mixed, and mastered by Matt Hyde, it was recorded between Long Branch, New Jersey’s Shorefire Recording Studios and Van Nuys, California’s The Hydeaway (Van Nuys, CA).

Drummer Danny Schuler spoke on the what inspired the band to make the album:

We started doing some shows, we started touring, and everybody started talking about, 'Hey, why don't we do a record?', our managers and everybody. And that was it. It was just we started talking about it. We started getting together with the purpose of writing songs and seeing how that went. After a while, we kind of hit our stride and the songs just kind of came quick.

== Release ==
On June 16, 2025, the albums first single "Forsaken" was released marking the band’s first new material in over a decade. Only July 17, Biohazard announced the album would be released in October of that year and also released the second single "Fuck the System" along with an official music video. The third single "Eyes on Six" was released on August 18, along with an official music video. The fourth and final single "Death of Me" was released on September 17.

== Critical reception ==
Stormbringer Magazine states that "The sound may have become more modern, and you also seem to hear one or the other effect in the vocals, but what is beaten around your ears here from New York captivates not only with a believable back-to-the-roots flair but also with a lightness and consistency that the last albums (maybe apart from "Reborn In Defiance") didn't want to succeed."

Gary Alcock of Ghostcult Magazine professed that that "Incorporating everything that made the band so popular back in the day, Biohazard in 2025 sounds like the perfect extension of their early nineties existence". He goes on to state that "The riffs hit hard with brief and subtle nods to classics like “Wrong Side of the Tracks” and “Tales From the Hardside,” as well as occasionally channeling the likes of Suicidal Tendencies, and fellow New Yorkers Agnostic Front and Merauder."

Blabbermouth indicated that "This is an album designed to respect BIOHAZARD's roots, while making something fresh and ferocious out of them".

Metalstorm wrote that "Divided We Fall sees the classic line-up return to their roots, producing an album that feels like a continuation of their 90s output, when the band were at their peak" continuing on to say "Never ones to shy away from speaking their minds, the intervening years have provided Biohazard with ample inspiration, which the band spin into gold on several tracks" and "While Divided We Fall starts off slowly, the album does pick up in quality, with a particularly strong mid-section".

== Track listing ==
All tracks are written by Biohazard.

Divided We Fall track listing
No.	Title	Length
1.	"Fuck the System"	3:43
2.	"Forsaken"	3:33
3.	"Eyes on Six"	3:20
4.	"Death of Me"	3:50
5.	"Word to the Wise"	3:17
6.	"Fight to be Free"	3:51
7.	"War Inside Me"	3:36
8.	"S.I.T.F.O.A."	3:24
9.	"Tear Down the Walls"	3:15
10.	"I Will Overcome"	3:05
11.	"Warriors"	3:14
Total length:		38:08

== Personnel ==
Credits adapted from the album's liner notes.

=== Biohazard ===
- Evan Seinfeld – vocals, bass
- Billy Graziadei – vocals, guitar
- Bobby Hambel – lead guitar
- Danny Schuler – drums

=== Additional contributors ===
- Matt Hyde – production, mixing, mastering, additional recording, additional engineering
- Joseph DeMaio – recording, engineering
- Phil Caivano – guitar technician, production technician
- Filip Horsch – art, graphic design

== Charts ==
Chart (2025)	Peak position
Austrian Albums Chart	25
Belgian Albums (Ultratop Flanders)	71
Belgian Albums (Ultratop Wallonia)	170
Swiss Albums Chart	51
Scottish Albums (OCC)	82
UK Album Downloads (OCC)	98
UK Physical Albums (OCC)	72
UK Rock & Metal Albums (OCC)	13
UK Independent Albums (OCC)	26
UK Independent Album Breakers (OCC)	8
