= Biohazard (album) =

Studio album by Biohazard
- Released: 1990
- Recorded: June 1990
- Studio: Broccoli Rabe Studios (Fairfield, New Jersey)
- Genre: Hardcore punk
- Length: 41:23
- Label: Maze Records
- Producer: John Burns

Biohazard chronology
Biohazard (1990)	Urban Discipline (1992)

Professional ratings
Review scores
Source	Rating
AllMusic	2.5/5 stars
Collector's Guide to Heavy Metal	6/10

Biohazard is the debut studio album by American hardcore punk band Biohazard, released in June 1990 by Maze Records.

The intro to the song "Retribution" is from the movie The Godfather Part II. The song "Wrong Side of the Tracks" features sampled dialogue from the movie The Warriors.

The songs "Wrong Side of the Tracks" and "Hold My Own" were rerecorded for the band's second album Urban Discipline. The 2004 remaster features a different cover than the original 1990 pressing, which prominently featured an orange biohazard symbol over the background of a circular brick wall pattern.

== Track listing ==
No.	Title	Length
1.	"Retribution"	4:26
2.	"Victory"	2:29
3.	"Blue Blood"	2:29
4.	"Howard Beach"	2:09
5.	"Wrong Side of the Tracks"	3:54
6.	"Justified Violence"	4:09
7.	"Skinny Song"	2:27
8.	"Hold My Own"	2:38
9.	"Panic Attack"	2:35
10.	"Pain"	3:30
11.	"Survival of the Fittest"	2:16
12.	"There & Back"	4:02
13.	"Scarred for Life"	4:15
Total length:		41:23

== Personnel ==
- Evan Seinfeld – vocals, bass
- Billy Graziadei – guitar, vocals
- Bobby Hambel – guitar
- Danny Schuler – drums
