= Biohazard (band) =

American metal band

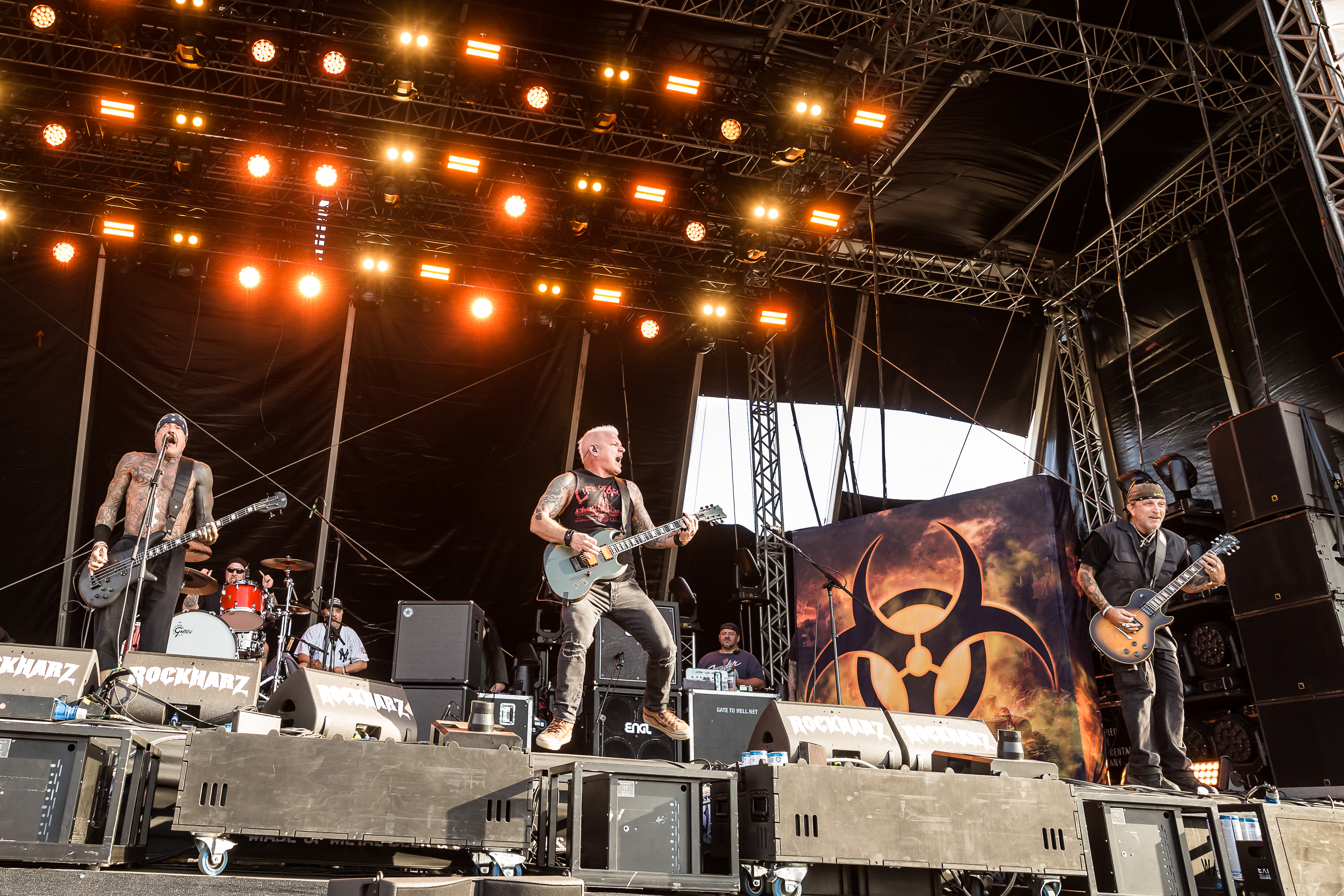
- Biohazard at Rockharz 2026

Background information
- Origin: New York City, U.S.
- Genres: Hardcore punk; rap metal; groove metal
- Works: Discography
- Years active: 1987–2006; 2008–2016; 2022–present
- Labels: Maze; Magnetic Air; Roadrunner; Warner Bros.; Mercury; King; Sanctuary; SPV America; Nuclear Blast
- Spinoffs: Suicide City, Powerflo
- Members: Billy Graziadei; Bobby Hambel; Danny Schuler; Evan Seinfeld
- Past members: Anthony Meo; Rob Echeverria; Leo Curley; Carmine Vincent; Scott Roberts
- Website: biohazard.com

Biohazard is an American hardcore band formed in Brooklyn, New York City, in 1987. They are one of the earliest bands to fuse hardcore punk and heavy metal with elements of hip hop. The original lineup consisted of bassist/vocalist Evan Seinfeld, guitarist Bobby Hambel, and drummer Anthony Meo. Guitarist/vocalist Billy Graziadei joined soon after, and drummer Danny Schuler replaced Meo before the recording of their first album, thus solidifying the band's lineup from 1988 to 1995.

After several lineup changes, a breakup, a 2008 reunion, and a seven-year period of inactivity, the classic lineup of Seinfeld, Graziadei, Hambel, and Schuler reunited in 2022 and began performing again in 2023.

== History ==
=== Early years: 1987–1990 ===
Biohazard formed in Brooklyn in 1987. Their first demo, released in 1988, caused a stir with journalists who felt that some of the band's lyrics displayed fascist and white supremacist views, overlooking the fact that frontman Seinfeld was himself Jewish. The accusations of racism in their music were denied by the group but in later interviews, Seinfeld and Graziadei explained that it had been a publicity stunt to win over the band Carnivore and their fans. Additionally, Seinfeld has defended the lyrics of songs such as "Master Race" and "America" as metaphors meant to gain the attention of listeners, and he maintains that the band was never racist. After the release of the first demo, Anthony Meo left the band and drummer Danny Schuler replaced him. A second demo tape followed in 1989.

Although Biohazard did not present themselves as a hardcore band, they shared stages with groups associated with the New York hardcore scene, such as the Cro-Mags and Agnostic Front. They also shared stages with the New Jersey band Mucky Pup, and a friendship between the two groups developed.

Biohazard's self-titled debut album was released in June 1990 through Maze Records, and in spite of being poorly promoted, it went on to sell 23,000 copies in the US by 1994 and approximately 40,000 copies by 2001. The album's subject matter revolved around Brooklyn, gang wars, drugs, and violence.

One year after the release, Seinfeld and Graziadei contributed vocals to the song "Three Dead Gophers" from Mucky Pup's third album, Now. The record was released on Roadrunner Records, who would soon issue Biohazard's second album.

=== Roadrunner Records and initial mainstream exposure: 1991–1993 ===
In 1992, Biohazard signed with Roadrunner Records and released Urban Discipline, which gave the band national and worldwide attention in both the heavy metal and hardcore communities. The band also began opening for larger acts, such as House of Pain, Sick of It All, Fishbone, and Kyuss.

In 1993, the hardcore rap group Onyx recorded an alternate "Bionyx" version of their hit single "Slam", with Biohazard as their backup band. This led to a collaboration on the title track of the Judgment Night soundtrack. The soundtrack would go on to sell over two million copies in the United States.

=== Warner Bros. and Hambel's departure: 1994–1998 ===
Months later, the band left Roadrunner Records and signed with Warner Bros. Records, who released their third studio LP, State of the World Address. The album was produced by Ed Stasium in Los Angeles and contained the singles "Tales from the Hard Side", "How It Is", featuring Sen Dog of Cypress Hill, and "Five Blocks to the Subway", for which videos were also shot. During their 1994 tour, the band made an appearance on the second stage at the Monsters of Rock festival, held at Castle Donington. State of the World Address went on to sell over one million copies. This was the last Biohazard album with Bobby Hambel, who left due to differences with the rest of the band. In late 1995, the band, along with Therapy? and Gunshot, contributed remixes to the Pitchshifter album The Remix War.

Biohazard recorded their fourth studio album, Mata Leão, as a three-piece in 1996. It was produced with the help of Dave Jerden. For the 1996–97 Mata Leão Tour, the band hired former Helmet guitarist Rob Echeverria. They also played on the Ozzfest mainstage, alongside Ozzy Osbourne, Slayer, Danzig, Fear Factory, and Sepultura.

While touring Europe in support of Mata Leão, the band recorded their Hamburg, Germany show for their first live album, No Holds Barred (Live in Europe), which was released in 1997 through Roadrunner Records.

In 1998, Seinfeld began his acting career, playing Jaz Hoyt on HBO's award-winning series Oz. The character was introduced in the second season and appeared throughout the sixth and final season.

=== Mercury Records: 1999–2000 ===
Biohazard signed to Mercury Records and released their fifth studio album, New World Disorder, in 1999, once again with Ed Stasium as producer. The relationship with Mercury Records soured quickly as the band felt betrayed and misunderstood by the label. They severed their ties amidst the merger of Mercury Records, Island Records, Def Jam Records, and Polygram into the Universal Music Group.

In 2000, the band continued to tour Europe and Japan, without the support of a record label or management. In 2001, they released a compilation album titled Tales from the B-Side. The record consisted of various B-sides and remixes from various eras in the band's recording history. The album was released by the Phantom Sound & Vision label. After the publication of Tales from the B-Side, Rob Echeverria resigned from the band in order to get married. Leo Curley, of Outline and All Means Necessary, was hired as his replacement.

=== New record deals and side projects: 2000–2004 ===
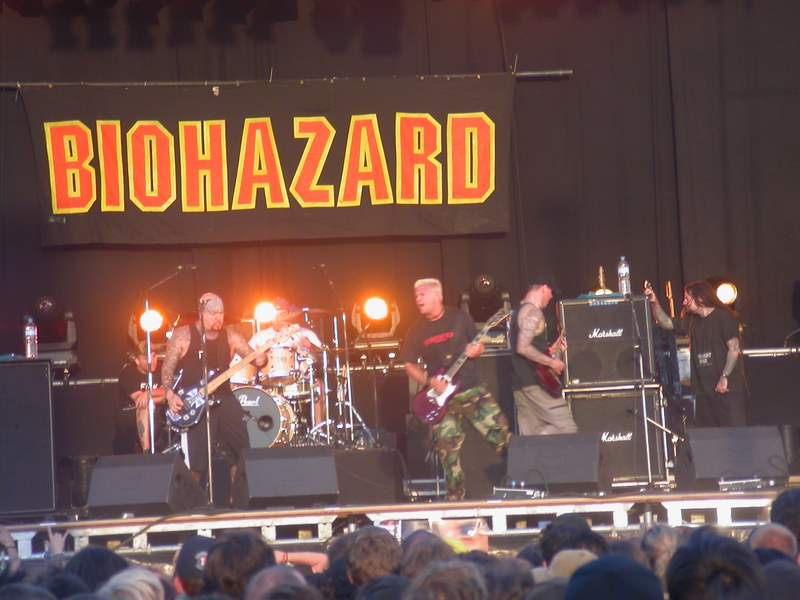
Biohazard at the Dour Festival, 2003

In the same year, Biohazard signed two new record deals, with SPV/Steamhammer in Europe and Sanctuary Records for the remainder of the world. Despite the new record deals, the band took some personal time in order to work on other projects.

Graziadei briefly formed a trip hop project, named Blu, with Jenifer Bair of the Ohio band Hilo. After writing and recording approximately twenty songs for the project, Bair relocated to Los Angeles to continue an art career, and the project dissolved. Graziadei also began work on a book, Tales From the Hardside. Schuler used his downtime to perform with New York band Among Thieves as a replacement drummer for the departing Will Shepler.

Graziadei and Schuler also collaborated in transforming Biohazard's Brooklyn rehearsal space into a digital recording studio, known as Rat Piss Studios, and soon after changed the name to Underground Sound Studios. Reinvesting into the band, Graziadei and Schuler honed their engineering and productions skills while recording and producing local acts and new Biohazard demos. The band then undertook the process of writing, recording, and producing their own music. Their studio work led to Biohazard's sixth album, Uncivilization, released in September 2001. It featured several guest appearances by members of bands such as Agnostic Front, Hatebreed, Pantera, Slipknot, Sepultura, Cypress Hill, Skarhead, and Type O Negative. Shortly after the release, Leo Curley left the band. He was replaced by former Nucleus member Carmine Vincent, who had previously toured with Biohazard as part of their road crew.

Biohazard completed their seventh studio album, Kill or Be Killed, in 2003. While touring North America with Kittie, Brand New Sin, and Eighteen Visions, Carmine Vincent was forced to leave the band due to a long term illness that required immediate surgery. The band hired former Spudmonsters and Among Thieves guitarist Scott Roberts to cover for Vincent. The tour itself would soon be curtailed when it was announced that Seinfeld had fallen ill. With more downtime due to Seinfeld's illness, Graziadei and Schuler collaborated to mix Life of Agony's live comeback album, River Runs Again: Live 2003. Once Seinfeld was healthy again, the band toured Japan and North America, headlining for bands such as Hatebreed, Agnostic Front, Throwdown, and Full Blown Chaos.

Once home, Seinfeld began recording and circulating demos for his own trip hop project, named Triplesicks. For a brief time, Graziadei and his wife moved to Brazil, where their daughter was born. While there, Graziadei struck up a friendship with drummer Fernandao Schafer. After jamming together in the studio, Schafer formed the band Ink, which Graziadei would eventually produce and later join. It wasn't long before Ink was renamed Endrah and an EP, titled DEMONstration, was released. Once Graziadei returned to New York City, the logistical problems of traveling back and forth led him to quit Endrah.

In early 2004, Graziadei teamed up with gabber DJ Rob Gee to help write and produce his music. When a few albums were completed, Graziadei joined Schuler, Roberts, DJ Starscream (aka Sid Wilson of Slipknot), Jeff Anthony, and Keith Rooney, to form Ampt. The band combined gabber music with hardcore and heavy metal. After writing several songs and putting together a live band, Graziadei and Schuler left the project in order to continue with Biohazard. By the end of 2004, the band had begun recording its eighth studio album, Means to an End. The completed album was lost in a studio disaster, forcing the band to completely re-record it. It was released in August 2005.

=== Breakup: 2004–2007 ===
In the meantime, Graziadei had formed another new band with former members of Kitte and The Groovenics. Originally named Rodek, the group eventually changed its name to Suicide City. In October 2004, Graziadei announced that Means to an End had been the final Biohazard album and that he would continue playing with Suicide City as his main focus. One month later, on the Biohazard website, it was announced that there would in fact be a 2005 Biohazard tour.

On December 15, Seinfeld and Graziadei participated in the Roadrunner United conglomerate event at the Nokia Theater in New York City, for an all-star event. The show opened with Biohazard's "Punishment", performed by Seinfeld, Graziadei, Sepultura's Andreas Kisser, former Fear Factory member Dino Cazares, and Slipknot's Joey Jordison.

In 2005, Seinfeld and Patrick formed The Tera Patrick Agency, with the goal of representing talent in both the adult and mainstream entertainment business. The same year, Suicide City released their first EP, Not My Year, and continued to tour as an opening act for such bands as Danzig, Taking Back Sunday, Mindless Self Indulgence, Otep, and Gwar. The band's full-length album, Frenzy, followed in 2009.

In January 2006, Danny Schuler announced his resignation from Biohazard and the formation of Bloodclot with singer Jon Joseph of the Cro-Mags, guitarist Scott Roberts, and bassist Craig Setari of Sick of It All. Roberts later announced that he would also be leaving Biohazard to focus on Bloodclot with Schuler. The same month, Graziadei announced that Biohazard would not go on a farewell tour after all.

Graziadei and Schuler relocated their recording studio to South Amboy, New Jersey, and renamed it Underground Sound Studios. The space was renovated to include a live room with 20-foot (6.1 m) ceilings and 4,000 square feet (370 m^{2}) of studio space. After Schuler's departure from the studio business, Graziadei relocated the studio to Los Angeles and changed the name to Firewater Studios.

In February 2006, Seinfeld participated in the filming of Supergroup, a VH-1 reality television series also starring Ted Nugent, Scott Ian, Sebastian Bach, and Jason Bonham as a supergroup named Damnocracy. The show debuted on May 21, 2006.

In March 2007, Seinfeld debuted his new band, The Spyderz, as an opening act for a Buckcherry performance. The group was originally named White Line Fever, until it was discovered that a UK band already owned the name. The Spyderz also featured guitarist John Monte, formerly of Ministry and M.O.D. In October 2008, Seinfeld also briefly joined Tattooed Millionaires as a bassist and co-vocalist. Seinfeld and Tera Patrick separated in 2009 and divorced in 2010.

=== Reunion and departure of Seinfeld: 2008–2021 ===
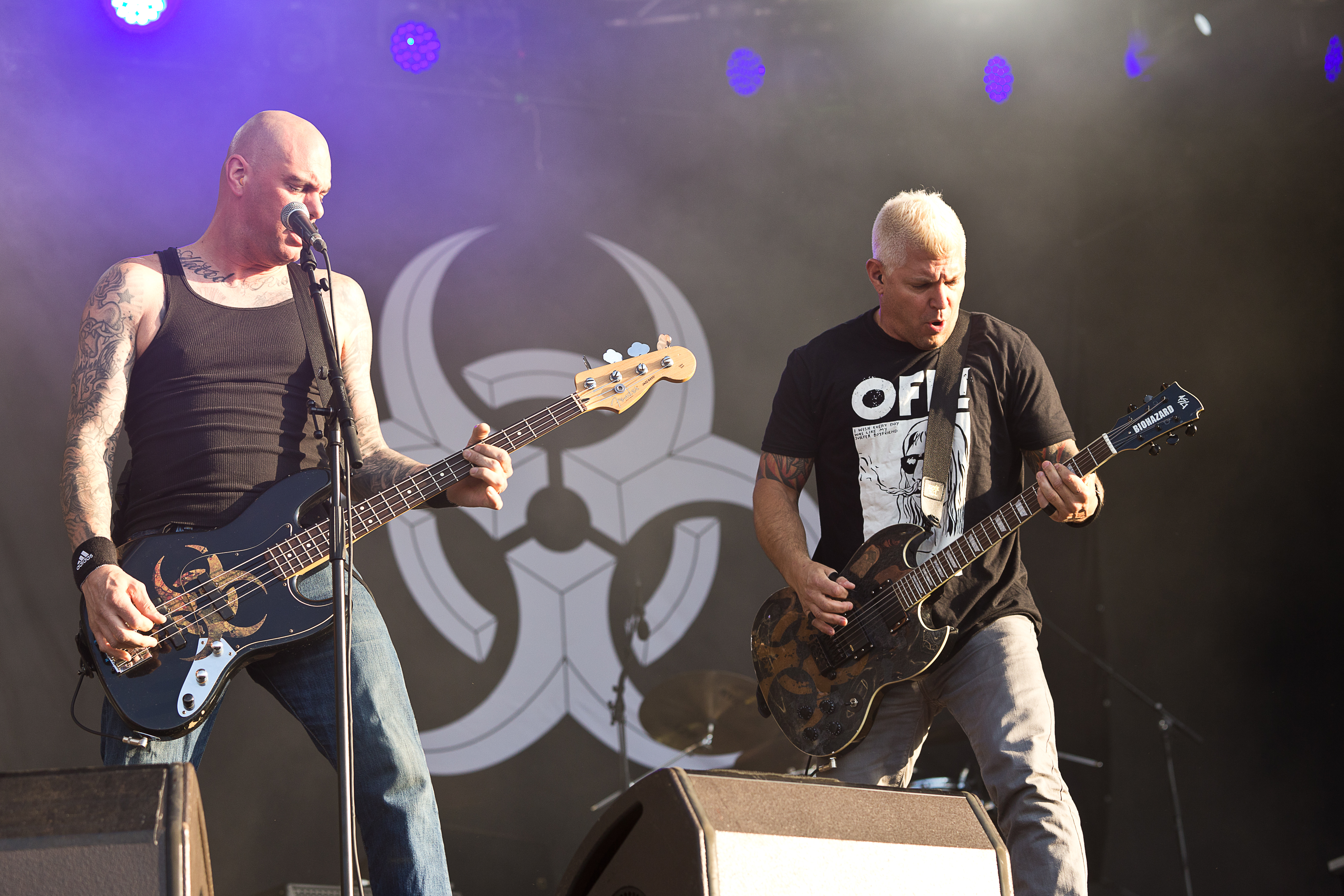
Biohazard at Rockharz Open Air 2015, Germany

In January 2008, Biohazard's classic lineup of Evan Seinfeld, Billy Graziadei, Danny Schuler, and Bobby Hambel made the announcement that rehearsals had begun for a 2008 summer tour, to commemorate the band's twentieth anniversary. They toured Australia and New Zealand in April with Chimaira, Throwdown, Bloodsimple, and headliners Korn. The band also took part in Persistence Tour 2009 and announced at one of their shows that they were working on a new record. It was also noted that the album would be dedicated to Type O Negative frontman Peter Steele, who died in April 2010. Biohazard brought in producer Toby Wright to work on the album and after several months at Graziadei's Firewater Studios in Los Angeles, the band completed their recording sessions.

In June 2011, Biohazard announced that they had amicably parted ways with Evan Seinfeld. Scott Roberts returned to replace Seinfeld for two UK dates, but no decision regarding a permanent replacement was made. In August 2011, the band announced that they were searching for a full-time singer to replace Seinfeld and opened auditions to the public. In September 2011, three months after his departure from Biohazard, Seinfeld joined Los Angeles-based heavy metal band Attika 7, which also featured Tony Campos, formerly of Soulfly and Static-X, and Rusty Coones. Attika 7 began recording their debut album for THC Music/Rocket Science in February 2012. After several lineup changes, including the departure of Campos, the band's debut album, Blood of my Enemies, was released in 2013. Seinfeld also continues to work in adult entertainment as Spyder Jonez, most notably through his production company, Iron Cross Entertainment and Teravison, which he co-owns with his former wife, Tera Patrick, as well as his own Rockstar Pornstar website.

In January 2012, Biohazard decided that Scott Roberts would remain with the band as a permanent member. Their new album, Reborn in Defiance, was released worldwide, with the exception of North America, on January 20, 2012, through the Nuclear Blast label. The band originally planned to offer a digital edition of the album as a free download for American fans on the same date, but those plans were canceled at the last moment. The album never received a United States label partner or release.

In support of the record, Biohazard embarked on a short co-headlining tour of Europe with Suicidal Tendencies in the latter half of January 2012. The band arrived in Belgium to begin the tour on January 20, where abruptly, Scott Roberts was rushed to the hospital. After going through several tests and receiving no answers concerning his ailment, Roberts checked himself out of the hospital in time to perform with the band. After their set, Roberts was rushed back to the hospital. Roberts was released from the hospital in time to continue on with the tour at the next stop in Oberhausen, Germany, on January 21. On January 22, Schuler left the tour in order to return home and be with his wife for the birth of their baby. Danny Lamagna of Sworn Enemy and Suicide City stepped in to replace Schuler until he was able to return.

In July 2015, Schuler indicated that the band was actively working on a new album. On February 10, 2016, Biohazard announced that previously scheduled upcoming shows had been canceled and that Scott Roberts was no longer a member of the band. In December 2017, Roberts clarified that he had quit the band due to not getting along with one of the other members and not enjoying being in the group anymore.

On June 23, 2017, the debut album from Graziadei's new band Powerflo was released. Graziadei formed the band with Sen Dog (Senen Reyes) of Cypress Hill, Rogelio Lozano of Downset., and Christian Olde Wolbers of Fear Factory. A follow-up EP, titled Bring That Shit Back, came out in June 2018. Coinciding with the EP's release, it was also announced that Graziadei would be releasing a solo album later in the year, under the name BillyBio. It was also stated that BillyBio would serve as the opening act on the European dates of Life of Agony's Rise of the Underground tour in October. The first BillyBio album, Feed the Fire, was released on November 30, 2018.

In January 2019, Graziadei explained that, despite not performing or recording since 2015, Biohazard still existed as a band and that when the time was right, there would be a new record.

=== Second reunion with Seinfeld: 2022–present ===
In October 2022, it was reported that the lineup of Seinfeld, Graziadei, Hambel, and Schuler had reunited. Seinfeld credited a chance encounter with Schuler's brother as inspiration to reconnect with his former bandmates, while Graziadei credited former manager Scott Koenig with inspiring the reunion. Koenig had been adamant on the band's reforming but died before Graziadei could be convinced. Graziadei then met Seinfeld at Koenig's memorial and began a conversation about getting back together.

The band announced two concerts for 2023, one at Bloodstock Open Air and another at Dynamo Metalfest. On March 10, 2023, Biohazard was announced as the headliner for the first day of Milwaukee Metal Fest, the band's first concert since reuniting. This was the first show for the band overall since 2015 and the first with Seinfeld since 2012. Later in June, Seinfeld noted that a new album and a documentary, directed by Drew Stone, were in the works. On July 14, 2023, it was reported that original drummer Anthony Meo had died of cancer; Graziadei and Schuler posted tributes via their social media pages.

In 2024, the band was inducted into the Metal Hall of Fame.

The band's new album, titled Divided We Fall, was released in October 2025. They issued the first single, "Forsaken", in June of that year, and the next one, "F*** the System", came out in July.

== Musical style and legacy ==
Critics have categorized Biohazard's music as hardcore punk, rap metal, and groove metal. The band merges elements of tough guy hardcore and hip hop. In the book Louder Than Hell, Seinfeld explained that their hip hop influence was derived from how "[he] and Billy were kind of shy about our vocals, so we started this rhythmic delivery because it sounded hard and you didn't have to worry about sounding too happy if you were singing".

The band have cited influences including Carnivore, Agnostic Front, the Cro-Mags, Black Sabbath, Iron Maiden, and Judas Priest.

They have been cited as an influence on the music of Pantera, Machine Head, Trapped Under Ice, Candiria, Sworn Enemy, Korn, and 25 ta Life.

== Band members ==
Current

- Evan Seinfeld – vocals, bass (1987–2006, 2008–2011, 2022–present)
- Billy Graziadei – vocals, rhythm guitar (1988–2006, 2008–2016, 2022–present)
- Bobby Hambel – lead guitar (1987–1995, 2008–2016, 2022–present)
- Danny Schuler – drums (1988–2006, 2008–2016, 2022–present)

Former

- Anthony Meo – drums (1987–1988; died 2023)
- Rob Echeverria – lead guitar (1996–2000)
- Leo Curley – lead guitar (2000–2002)
- Carmine Vincent – lead guitar (2002–2003)
- Scott Roberts – lead guitar (2003–2006); bass, vocals (2011–2016)

Biohazard, band members at Rockharz 2026

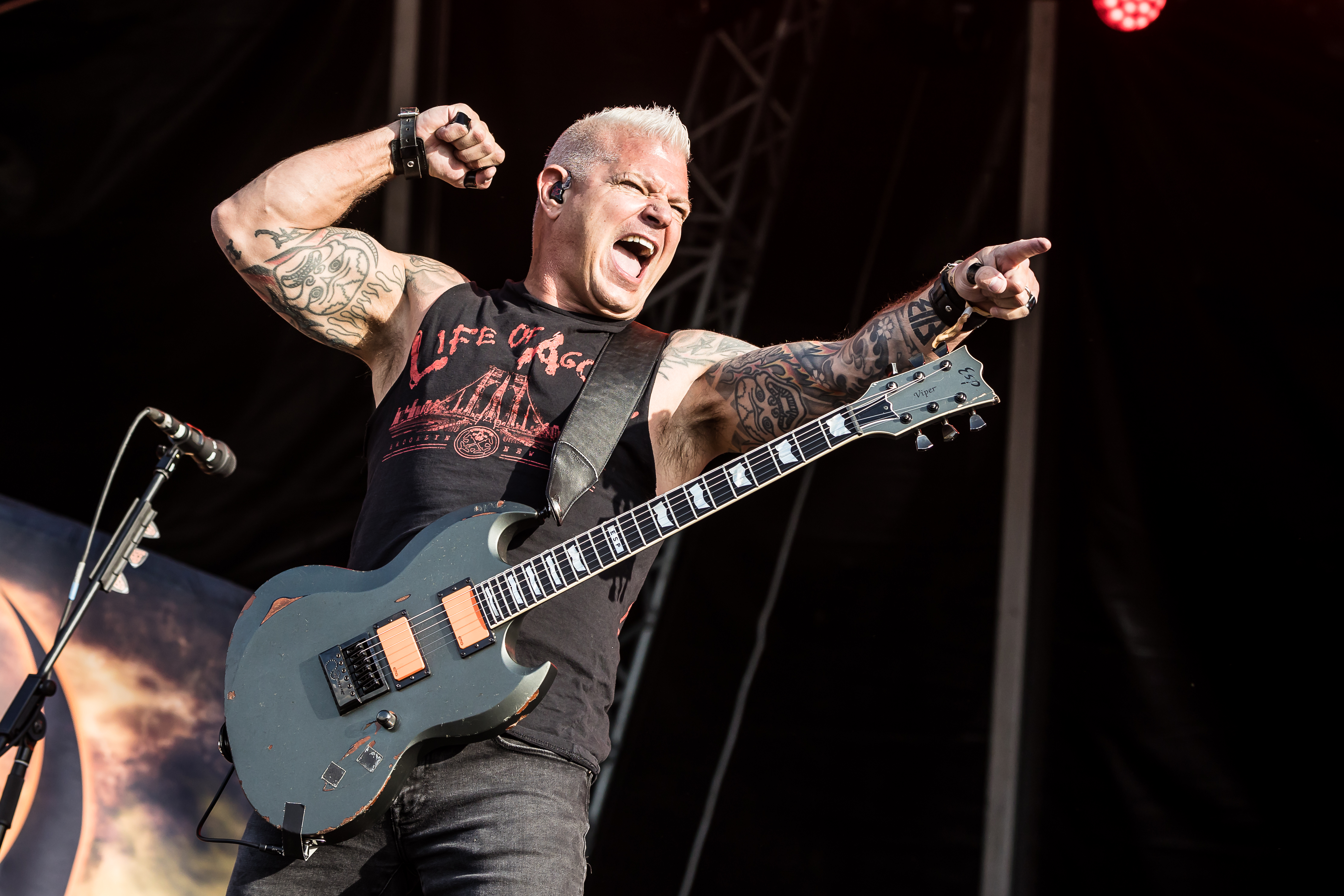
Billy Graziadei, vocals, rhythm-guitar

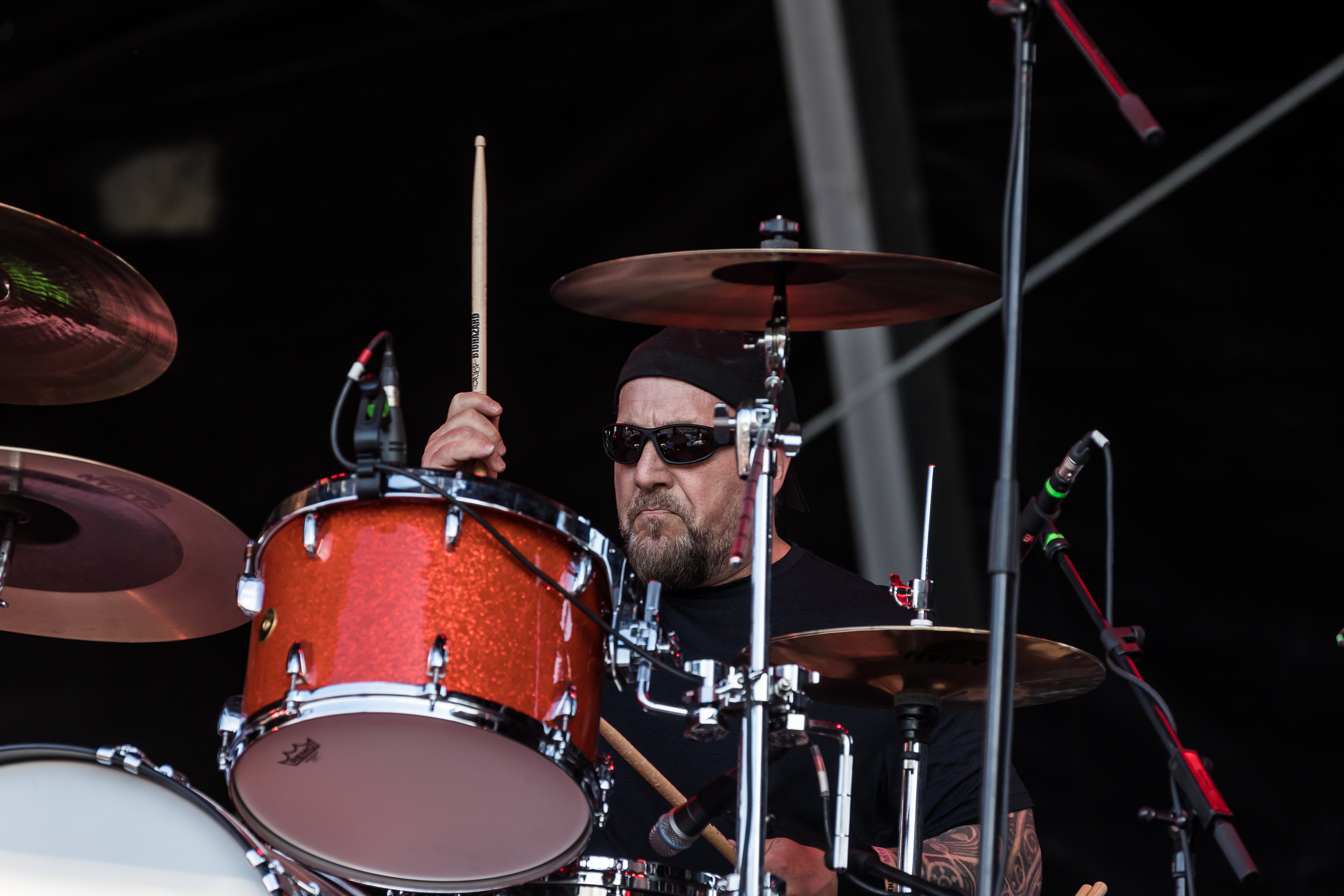
Danny Schuler, drums

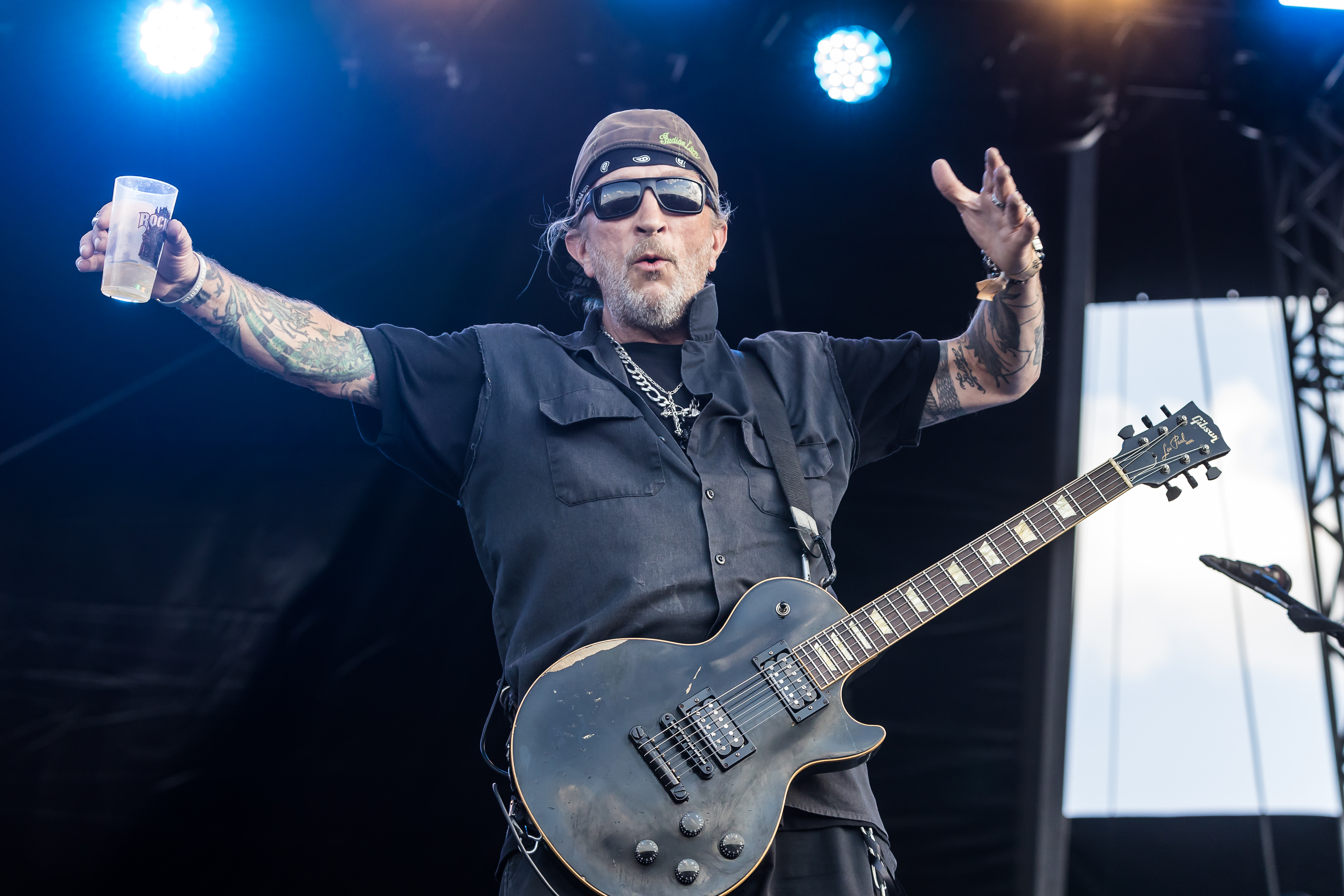
Bobby Hambel, lead-guitar

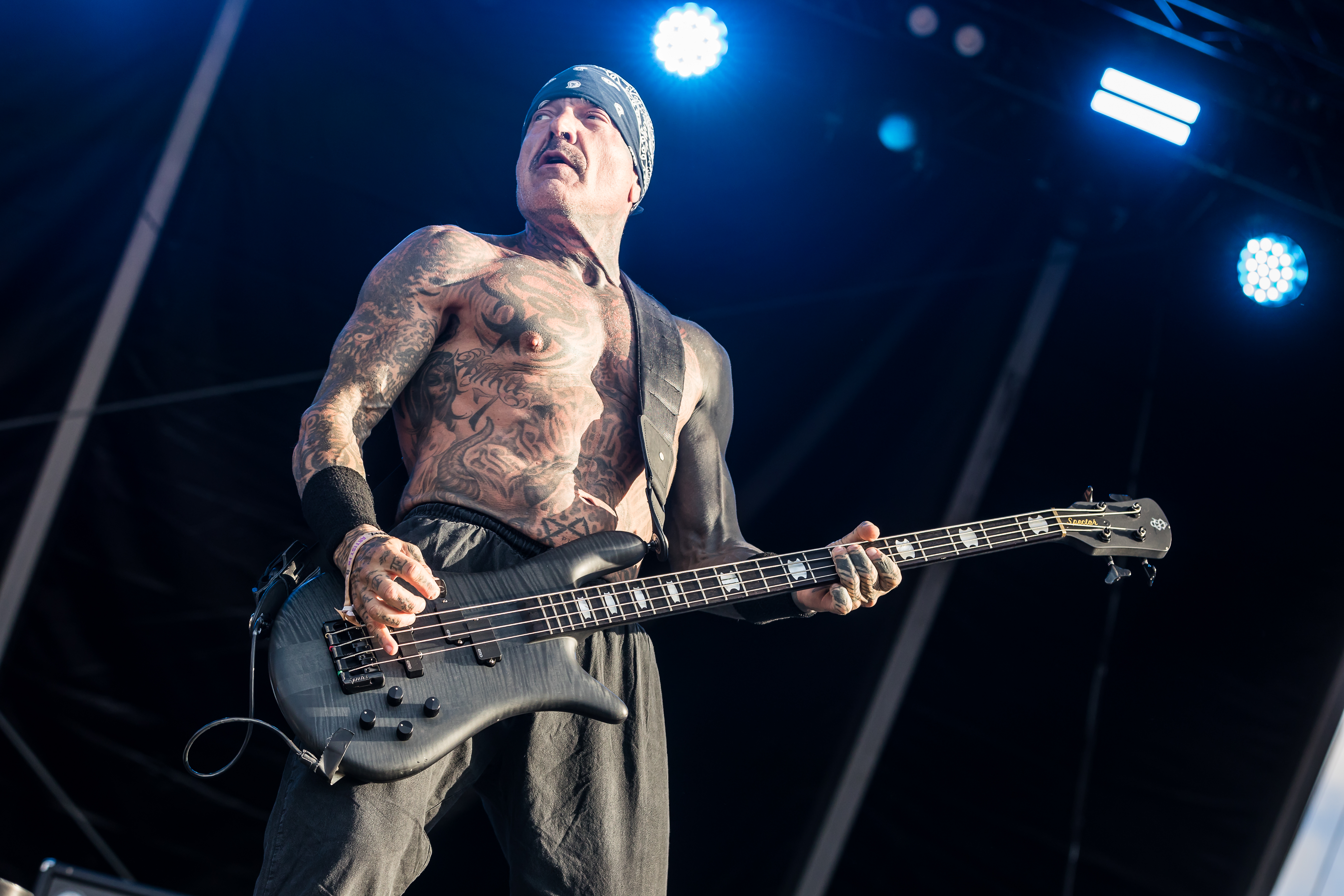
Evan Seinfeld, vocals, bass

Timeline

== Discography ==
- Biohazard (1990)
- Urban Discipline (1992)
- State of the World Address (1994)
- Mata Leão (1996)
- New World Disorder (1999)
- Uncivilization (2001)
- Kill or Be Killed (2003)
- Means to an End (2005)
- Reborn in Defiance (2012)
- Divided We Fall (2025)
