= Brick By Brick (band) =

American metal band

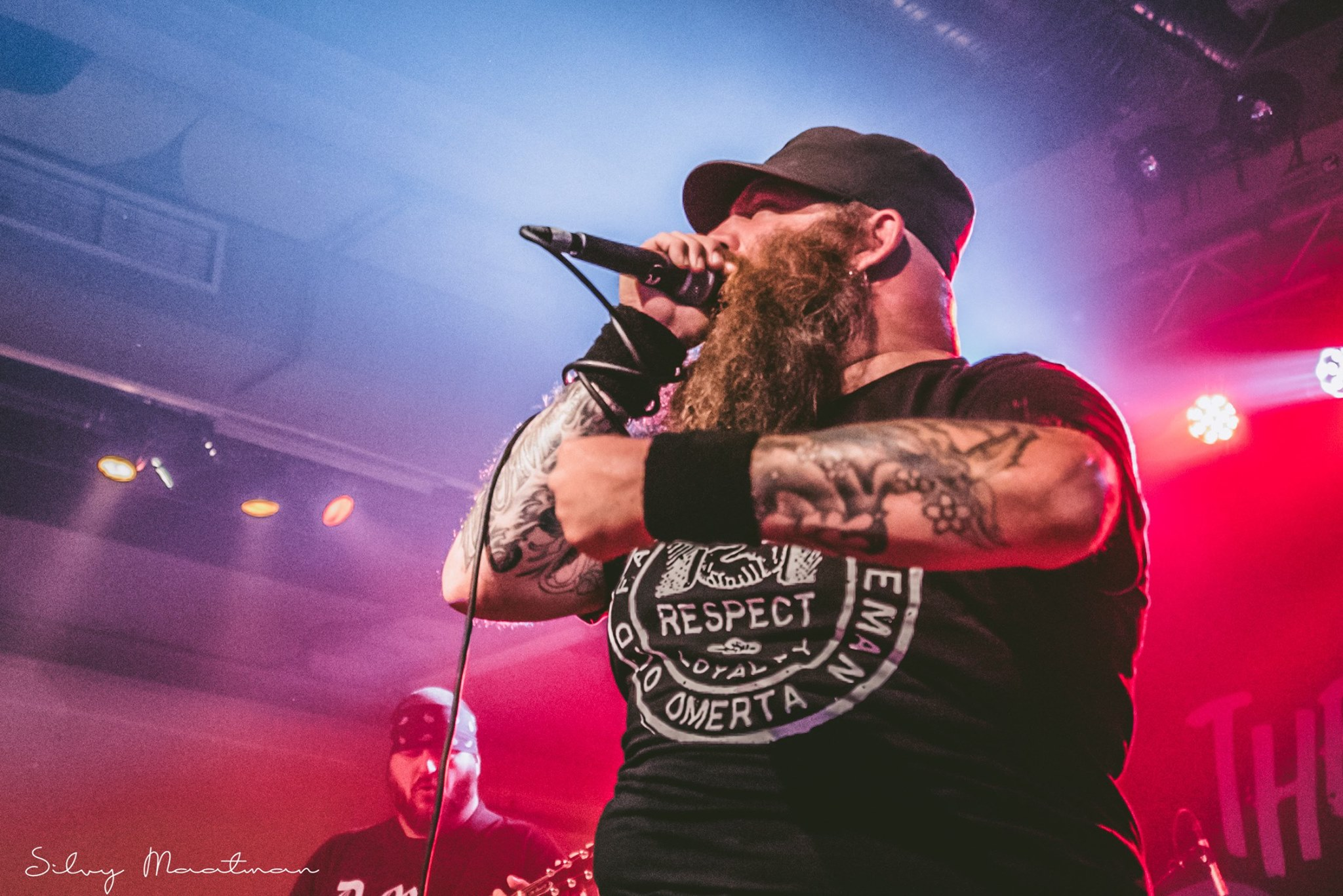
- Brick By Brick at Sound Of Revolution in Eindhoven, Netherlands

Background information
- Origin: Troy, New York, U.S.
- Genres: Hardcore, Metal, NYHC
- Years active: 2004–present
- Labels: Upstate Records; Fast Break! Records; Eulogy Recordings; Spare Change Records; Stupid White Boy Records
- Members: Ray Mazzola; Mike Valente; Andy Parsons; Jeff Facci
- Past members: James "Jameson" Muller; Rich Roberts; Rory O'Brien; Sean Green; Dave Gragnano

Brick By Brick is a hardcore metal band based out of Albany, New York. They have released seven studio records and four 7" vinyl. The record Thin The Heard was re-released on 12" vinyl in 2017.

== History ==
Brick By Brick was based on the Troy-Core style that the founding members grew up on. Mike Valente recruited Sean Green and Rory O'Brien after having a conversation about similar musical interests. Rich Roberts was picked as their frontman after a few other auditions. The idea was to be reminiscent of Hatebreed, Slayer, and the Troy style. At the time, they all lived in Troy, New York, and the "Troy-Core" moniker was embraced.

In less than a year, the band released their first record Pull The Trigger. In 2007, they released their second record, Wings Of Angels.

They released their third album, Severed Ties, independently in 2010.

In 2012, O'Brien decided to leave the band to focus more on his family. The band recruited James Muller to fill in, but eventually became a permanent member. The band released a 7" split with the California-based hardcore band, Ruckus. Brick By Brick contributed a song to the split called "In The Ruins", which featured guest vocalist Vincent Bennett of The Acacia Strain. In 2014, Brick By Brick started touring. Not long after the band rose to the next level, Roberts was replaced by Ray Mazzola of Full Blown Chaos. The band has appeared at festivals including New England Metal Fest, Black n Blue Bowl, Tsunami Fest, Breast Fest, Motorcity Fest, Grownfest, and the Rebellion Tour, among others.

In 2015, the band signed with Eulogy Recordings and released their first international record, This World, My Enemy. Their next international record, Thin The Herd, was released on Fast Break! Records in 2017.

In late 2017, Sean Green had a mutual departure from the band. He was replaced by Andy Parsons.

In 2018, Brick By Brick signed with Upstate Records, and entered the studio to record their sixth studio record, Hive Mentality, which would include a revamp of the song "In The Ruins", again featuring Vincent Bennett of The Acacia Strain. The record also featured guest vocals from Tony Foresta of the bands Municipal Waste and Iron Reagan, as well as vocals from Jessica Pimentel, lead vocalist for the band Alekhine's Gun.

Brick By Brick released a new album under Upstate Records, entitled Dismal Existence on February 18, 2022. The album features guest vocals from Chuck Billy of Testament.

In July 2022, James Muller parted ways with the band due to an injury that prevented him from playing drums. He was replaced by Jeff Facci of Full Blown Chaos.

== Band Members ==
Current members

- Ray Mazzola – vocals (2014–present)
- Mike Valente – guitar (2004–present)
- Andy Parsons – bass (2017–present)
- Jeff Facci – drums (2022–present)

Former members

- Rich Roberts – vocals (2004–2005, 2006–2014)
- Dave Gragnano – vocals (2005–2006)
- Rory O'Brien – drums (2004–2012)
- Sean Green – bass (2004–2017)
- James Muller - drums (2012–2022)

Timeline

== Discography ==
Studio albums

- Pull The Trigger (2004, Stupid White Boy Records)
- Wings Of Angels (2007, Spare Change Records)
- Severed Ties (2010, Self-Released)
- This World, My Enemy (2015, Eulogy Recordings)
- Thin The Herd (2017, Fast Break! Records)
- Hive Mentality (2019, Upstate Records)
- Dismal Existence (2022, Upstate Records)
- Collapse (2025, Upstate Records)

7" Vinyl

- Bad Days & Tough Breaks, CBGB's Live (2006, Black Rose Records)
- Brick By Brick/Ruckus split (2012, Bad Ground Records)
- NYHC - The Way It Was Meant To Be (2013, Reaper Records)
- Brick By Brick/Cutthroat LA split (2021, Upstate Records)
- Brick By Brick/Concrete split (2025, Upstate Records)

12" Vinyl

- Thin The Herd (2018, PitchforkNY-US, Demons Run Amok-Europe)
- Hive Mentality (2019, Upstate Records-US, Demons Run Amok-Europe)
- Dismal Existence (2022, Upstate Records)
- Collapse (2025, Upstate Records)

Compilations

- Upstate Records, Volume One (2018, Upstate Records)
