= Tales from the B-Side =

Compilation album by Biohazard
- Released: July 3, 2001
- Genre: Hardcore punk; rapcore
- Length: 41:16
- Label: Renegade Recordings

Biohazard chronology
New World Disorder (1999)	Tales from the B-Side (2001)	Uncivilization (2001)

Professional ratings
Review scores
Source	Rating
AllMusic	3/5 stars

Tales from the B-Side is a collection of B-sides from American hardcore punk band Biohazard.

== Track listing ==
No.	Title	Length
1.	"Three Point Back"	2:42
2.	"Falling"	2:57
3.	"Sumptin' to Prove" (Demo)	1:29
4.	"Slam" (Bionyx remix, feat. Onyx)	3:40
5.	"Beaten"	3:12
6.	"How It Is" (Remix)	4:12
7.	"Sadman"	3:47
8.	"Enslaved"	2:09
9.	"Judgment Night" (feat. Onyx)	4:36
10.	"Inhale"	1:54
11.	"Piece of Mind"	2:45
12.	"Shades of Grey" (Demo)	3:24
13.	"Punishment" (Demo)	4:30
Total length:		41:16
