= Uncivilization =

Studio album by Biohazard
- Released: September 11, 2001
- Studio: Mission Sound Studios (Brooklyn, New York)
- Genre: Hardcore punk; rap metal
- Length: 58:03
- Label: Sanctuary
- Producer: Billy Graziadei, Danny Schuler, Evan Seinfeld, Jive Jones

Biohazard chronology
Tales from the B-Side (2001)	Uncivilization (2001)	Kill or Be Killed (2003)

Professional ratings
Review scores
Source	Rating
AllMusic	2.5/5 stars
Collector's Guide to Heavy Metal	7/10

Uncivilization is the sixth studio album by American hardcore punk band Biohazard, released on September 11, 2001, by Sanctuary Records and is the only album to feature guitarist Leo Curley, who would leave the band shortly after to focus on writing his own music.

== Track listing ==
No.	Title	Writer(s)	Length
1.	"Sellout"	Danny Schuler	3:31
2.	"Uncivilization"	Billy Graziadei	4:08
3.	"Wide Awake"	Schuler	3:46
4.	"Get Away"	Schuler	3:46
5.	"Unified" (feat. Roger Miret, Danny Diablo and Puerto Rican Mike)	Evan Seinfeld	2:55
6.	"Gone" (feat. Igor Cavalera)	Graziadei	4:16
7.	"Letter Go"	Graziadei	1:22
8.	"Last Man Standing" (feat. Sen Dog)	Graziadei, Seinfeld, Schuler	3:17
9.	"HFFK" (feat. Phil Anselmo)	Graziadei, Seinfeld, Schuler	2:46
10.	"Domination" (feat. Corey Taylor and Jamey Jasta)	Graziadei, Schuler	4:24
11.	"Trap" (feat. Andreas Kisser and Derrick Green)	Graziadei	3:56
12.	"Plastic"	Seinfeld	5:29
13.	"Cross the Line" (feat. Peter Steele)	Seinfeld	4:11
Total length:			58:03

Bonus tracks
No.	Title	Length
14.	"A.T.F."	4:01
15.	"Life of My Own" (Cro-Mags cover)	2:52
16.	"Sex and Violence" (Carnivore cover)	3:23

=== Track listing changes ===
An early track listing for Uncivilization was published by Blabbermouth.net in April 2001, several months before the album's release. The final release contained several changes, with two songs being removed entirely and others added late in the recording process.

Early track list (April 2001)	Final track list (September 2001)
Unified	Sellout
Population Control	Population Control
H.F.F.K. (featuring Phil Anselmo)	Unified
Last Man Standing (featuring Sen Dog)	Gone
Getaway	Last Man Standing (featuring Sen Dog)
Gone	H.F.F.K. (featuring Phil Anselmo)
Treason	Get Away
Never Turn Your Back On Me	Trap
Sellout	Cross the Line
Crossed the Line	Lonely Time
—	Plastic
—	Don’t Stand Too Close
—	Letter Go

A demo recording titled "Treason" was considered during the sessions but omitted from the final track listing, alongside "Never Turn Your Back on Me".

== Personnel ==
Credits adapted from AllMusic.

Biohazard

- Billy Graziadei – vocals, guitar, engineer, production
- Evan Seinfeld – vocals, bass, production
- Leo Curley – guitar
- Danny Schuler – drums, engineer, production

Additional personnel

- Phil Anselmo – additional vocals on track 9
- Tristan Avakian – additional guitar
- Ken Caillat – executive producer
- Pete Deboer – engineering
- George Fullan – assistant engineer
- Randy Glenn – quality control
- Janelle Guillot – voiceover
- Jive Jones – production
- U.E. Nastasi – mastering
- Melinda Pepler – production coordination
- Sen Dog – additional vocals on track 8
- Corey Taylor – additional vocals on track 10
- Ed Stasium – mixing
- Peter Steele – additional vocals on track 13
- Kristian Storli – authoring
- John Trickett – executive producer
- Charlie Watts – mastering
- Chuck Ybarra – graphic design

== Charts ==
Chart (2001)	Peak position
Austrian Albums Chart	54
German Albums Chart	53
