= No Holds Barred (Biohazard album) =

Live album by Biohazard
- Released: August 12, 1997
- Recorded: February 17, 1997
- Venue: Markthalle Hamburg (Hamburg, Germany)
- Genre: Hardcore punk; rapcore
- Length: 63:27
- Label: Roadrunner
- Producer: Biohazard

Biohazard chronology
Mata Leão (1996)	No Holds Barred (1997)	New World Disorder (1999)

Professional ratings
Review scores
Source	Rating
AllMusic	3/5 stars
Chronicles of Chaos	3/10
Collector's Guide to Heavy Metal	7/10
The Encyclopedia of Popular Music	3/5 stars
NME	2/10
Vox	4/10

No Holds Barred is a live album by American band Biohazard. It is the first to feature former Helmet guitarist Rob Echeverria, who had joined the band for the Mata Leão tour.

== Track listing ==
No.	Title	Length
1.	"Shades of Grey"	3:54
2.	"What Makes Us Tick"	2:00
3.	"Authority"	2:16
4.	"Urban Discipline"	5:03
5.	"Modern Democracy"	2:35
6.	"Love Denied"	1:52
7.	"Business"	2:34
8.	"Tales from the Hard Side"	3:58
9.	"Better Days"	2:17
10.	"Victory"	2:18
11.	"Survival of the Fittest"	0:47
12.	"Blue Blood"	0:29
13.	"Black and White and Red All Over"	0:42
14.	"Victory (Reprise)"	0:29
15.	"How It Is"	3:26
16.	"After Forever" (Black Sabbath cover)	1:53
17.	"Tears of Blood"	4:41
18.	"German Lesson #7"	0:41
19.	"Chamber Spins Three"	3:41
20.	"Wrong Side of the Tracks"	3:35
21.	"Waiting to Die"	3:14
22.	"These Eyes (Have Seen)"	2:45
23.	"Punishment"	4:57
24.	"Hold My Own"	3:19
Total length:		63:27

== Personnel ==
- Evan Seinfeld – vocals, bass
- Billy Graziadei – vocals, guitar
- Danny Schuler – drums, percussion
- Rob Echeverria – guitar
