= Biohazard (1988 demo tape) =

Demo album by Biohazard
- Released: 1988
- Recorded: 1988
- Genre: Crossover thrash, hardcore punk
- Length: 39:40
- Label: none

Biohazard chronology
Biohazard (1988)	Infection Approaching (1989)

Professional ratings
Review scores
Source	Rating
AllMusic	2.5/5 stars

The 1988 demo is the first demo tape by American band Biohazard, released in 1988. It is the only release to feature drummer Anthony Meo, who was replaced by Danny Schuler for the band's second demo the following year, Infection Approaching.

== Track listing ==
1. "Intro/Skinny Song" – 2:35
2. "Master Race" – 2:58
3. "Victory of Death" – 2:37
4. "Howard Beach" – 4:30
5. "Money for the Unemployed" – 2:27
6. "Lying Coke Bitch" – 2:17
7. "America" – 3:01
8. "Panic Attack" – 4:07
9. "Survival of the Fittest"
10. "Howard Beach Reprise"
11. "Outro/Skinny Song"
