= State of the World Address =

Studio album by Biohazard
- Released: May 24, 1994
- Recorded: September 1993 – March 1994
- Studios: A&M Studios (Hollywood, California)
- Genres: Hardcore punk; rap metal; groove metal
- Length: 57:36
- Label: Warner Bros.
- Producer: Ed Stasium

Biohazard chronology
Urban Discipline (1992)	State of the World Address (1994)	Mata Leão (1996)

Singles from State of the World Address
- 1. "Tales from the Hard Side" Released: 1994; 2. "How It Is" Released: 1994; 3. "Five Blocks to the Subway" Released: 1995

State of the World Address is the third studio album by American band Biohazard, released on May 24, 1994, by Warner Bros. Records. Sen Dog has a guest performance on the song "How It Is". Until 2012's Reborn in Defiance, this would be the final album to feature guitarist Bobby Hambel, who would leave the band after touring due to musical differences.

"Lack There Of" [sic] contains audio samples taken from the Quentin Tarantino film Reservoir Dogs.

== Marketing ==
Billboard magazine detailed a long-term marketing strategy developed and executed by Warner Bros. for Biohazard's breakout from the underground into mainstream culture, as marked by the highly anticipated State of the World Address. The magazine quoted the great exuberance expressed by several retail outlet representatives and by the Warner Bros. label, about the band as a new "legitimate commercial force".

The label included its alternative marketing department in deploying many "low-key" tactics of marketing directly to retail stores without the "perception of hype", to raise the industry's general awareness of the band's existence and message. The label created a censored version of the album for radio stations, and an electronic press kit detailing the music's social issues was distributed to retailers. A 1980 Chevy Malibu emblazoned with the Biohazard logo was driven around Southern California, with label representatives passing out materials to cross-market the band with various social justice organizations.

The band appeared on Beavis and Butt-Head, and the album's development was detailed for three weeks on MTV's Headbangers Ball. There were two contests to discover fans who bore the best Biohazard tattoos. The album was marketed to alternative radio stations in addition to metal stations. Music videos were made for the songs "How It Is" and "Five Block to the Subway."

== Background ==
Several tracks for State of the World Address were developed from ideas dating back to the Urban Discipline sessions. Billy Graziadei has stated that an early version of "Five Blocks to the Subway" was originally recorded for Urban Discipline but held back, as the band did not feel it was ready for release at the time. The song was reworked and appeared on State of the World Address.

The song "How It Is" features rapper Sen Dog guitarist Billy Graziadei commented on how the collaboration came about in a 1994 interview stating: "We wrote the song, and we were friends with him, and we heard his voice in the song. We were like, "It sounds like Sen would say something like this." So we asked him to listen to the song, and he came to the studio and jammed on it, and we asked him if he wanted to record it with us, and he did."

Prior to recording the songs Biohazard would play them at live shows to see how the crowd to react. If they did not get the reaction they were looking for they would then tweak the songs for the recording process.

Much of the albums lyrical content focuses on addressing social issues, violence, injustice, and corruption.

== Commercial performance ==
Billboard 200 recognized this as the first Biohazard album to enter its chart, at number 48 in the first week and number 88 in the second week. Sales of 22,000 units were reported in the first week. It also sold an additional 160,000 copies outside the US in its first week, primarily in Germany. This made it their first album to reach the charts in Australia, Austria, Denmark, Sweden and the UK. It also reached the top ten in Germany peaking at number 7. By 2002, Soundscan reported the album had sold 198,970 copies in the US, and it has since gone on to sell 1 million copies worldwide.

Both singles "Tales from the Hard Side" and "How It Is" reached the UK singles chart peaking at number 47 and 62 respectively staying on the chart for multiple weeks.

== Reception ==
Professional ratings
Review scores
Source	Rating
AllMusic	3/5 stars
Collector's Guide to Heavy Metal	7/10
The Encyclopedia of Popular Music	3/5 stars
Entertainment Weekly	B+
Kerrang!	4/5 stars
Rock Hard	8.5/10
Select	3/5 stars
Vox	6/10

Entertainment Weekly gave the album a B+, saying that with this album, the band is "redefining metal not only by writing what amount to modern-day protest songs, but also by creating thrash that grooves rather than lumbers" and concluding that "metal rarely gets as fierce or as forward-thinking as it does here". AllMusic gave the album 3/5 stars writing "they express their anger in shouted, profanity-filled lyrics, pounding rhythms, and raging guitar lines. But they don't bring any particular insight to their observations, and their musical approach, but for the occasional piano interlude, is near-generic."

In 2016, Metal Hammer placed the album on its list of the top 10 rap metal albums. The review says the album "brought tough street-metal grit to bear upon flagrant boom-bap grooves", summarizing with this: "Rap-metal by default rather than design, it was a natural and neat fit for a band that deserves more credit for their pioneering nous."

== Track listing ==
No.	Title	Length
1.	"State of the World Address"	3:18
2.	"Down for Life"	3:46
3.	"What Makes Us Tick"	2:23
4.	"Tales from the Hard Side"	5:40
5.	"How It Is" (featuring Sen Dog and DJ Lethal)	4:02
6.	"Remember"	3:40
7.	"Five Blocks to the Subway"	3:13
8.	"Each Day"	3:52
9.	"Failed Territory"	5:40
10.	"Lack There Of"	4:47
11.	"Pride"	3:16
12.	"Human Animal"	4:53
13.	"Cornered"	3:11
14.	"Love Denied"	5:55
Total length:		57:36

- Track 14 contains a hidden track, an a cappella titled "Ink", professing the band's love of tattoo art. "Love Denied" ends at 4:40, with the hidden track beginning at 4:54.

== Personnel ==
- Evan Seinfeld – bass, vocals
- Billy Graziadei – guitars, vocals
- Bobby Hambel – guitars
- Danny Schuler – drums
- Sen Dog – guest vocals on "How It Is"
- Ed Stasium – producer, mixer

== Charts ==
Chart (1994)	Peak position
US Billboard 200	48
Australian Albums (ARIA Charts)	67
Austrian Albums Chart	10
Dutch Albums Chart	35
German Albums Chart	7
Swedish Albums Chart	12
Swiss Albums Chart	19
UK Albums Chart	72
UK Physical Albums Chart	72
