= Billy Graziadei =

American musician

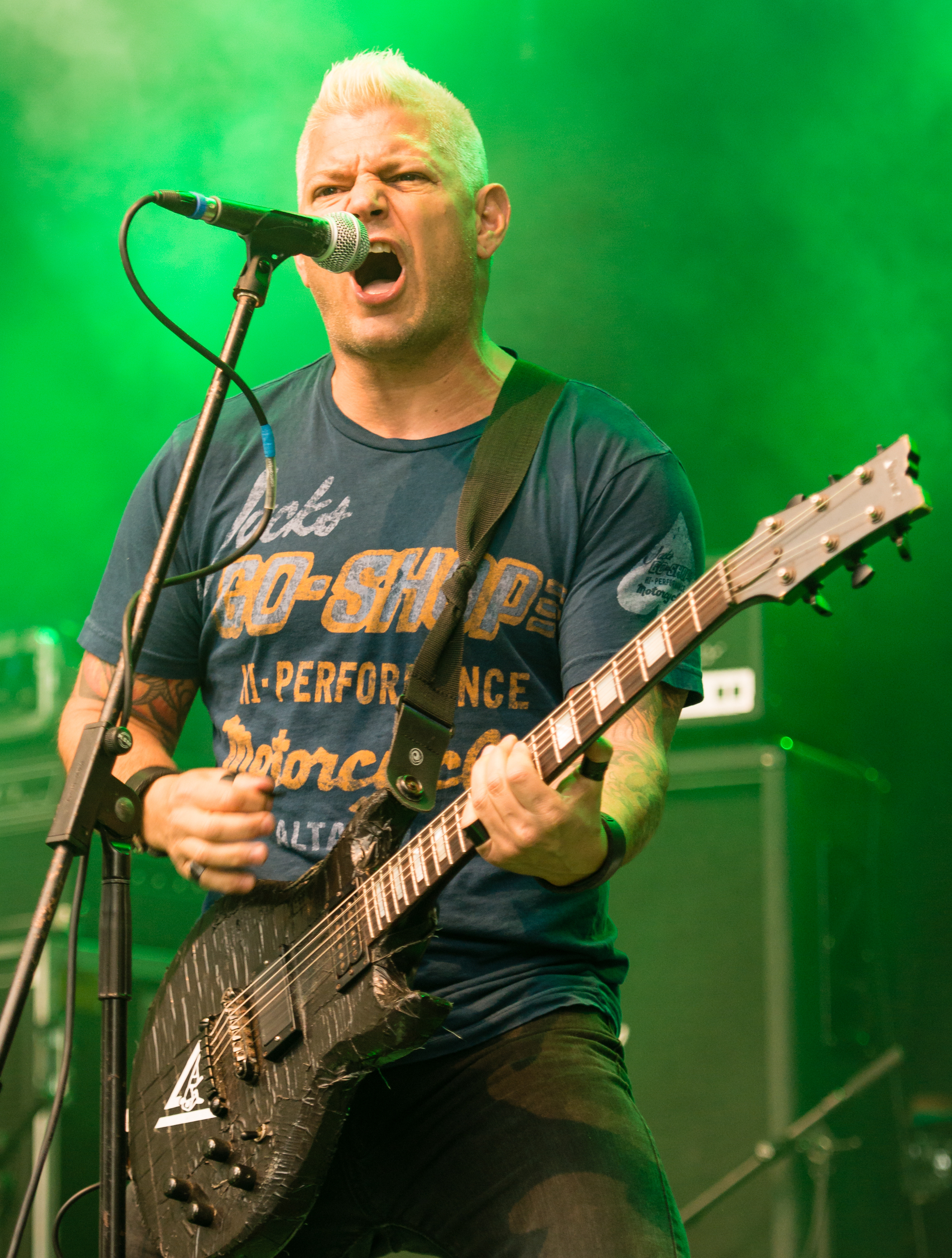
- Graziadei in 2014

Background information
- Born: July 28, 1969 (age 57); Boston, Massachusetts, U.S.
- Genres: Hardcore punk, rap metal, groove metal, alternative metal, thrash metal, crossover thrash
- Occupation: Musician
- Instruments: Guitar, vocals
- Years active: 1987–present
- Member of: Biohazard, Powerflo, BillyBio
- Formerly of: Suicide City, Museum of Corruption
- Website: biohazard.com

Billy Graziadei (born July 28, 1969) is an American musician who is the rhythm guitarist, one of the vocalists and the only continuous member of the hardcore/metal band Biohazard. He is also the rhythm guitarist and co-lead vocalist of the band Powerflo and frontman for BillyBio, his latest solo project. In addition, he is the former rhythm guitarist for Suicide City. Graziadei also performed as part of the Roadrunner United project in 2005 as well as Blood for Blood in 2010.

Additionally, through his music, Graziadei frequently speaks about the realities of inner city life in New York City, while promoting tolerance, speaking out against racism and opposing drug abuse. Graziadei is the owner of Los Angeles-based Firewater Studios.

== Early life ==
Billy Graziadei was born on July 28, 1969, in Boston, Massachusetts. He became involved in music from an early age, playing his family’s out-of-tune upright piano. He then started studying music under both his grandfather and uncle. His love for music eventually led him to the hardcore scene in New York City in the 1980s, where he would attend Sunday matinee hardcore shows at CBGB’s along with metal shows at Brooklyn’s L’Amour metal/rock club. Prior to forming Biohazard he was in another band called Museum of Corruption.

== Biohazard ==
In 1987, Graziadei became a member of Biohazard alongside Evan Seinfeld, Anthony Meo and Bobby Hambel. Through their music, the band has promoted tolerance, opposed racism, spoken out against drug abuse all while speaking about the realities of inner city life.

The band briefly went on hiatus in 2006, but shortly returned in 2008. This second run lasted till 2016, when the band went on an indefinite hiatus for a second time with Graziadei then focusing on his solo project. In October 2022, it was reported that the lineup of Seinfeld, Graziadei, Hambel, and Schuler had reunited for a handful of reunion shows which eventually turned into the band releasing their first album in 13 years with Divided We Fall (2025).

In 2024, Biohazard was inducted into the Metal Hall of Fame, Graziadei attended the 9 annual gala and accepted the award on the band’s behalf.

== Other projects ==
=== Firewater Studios ===
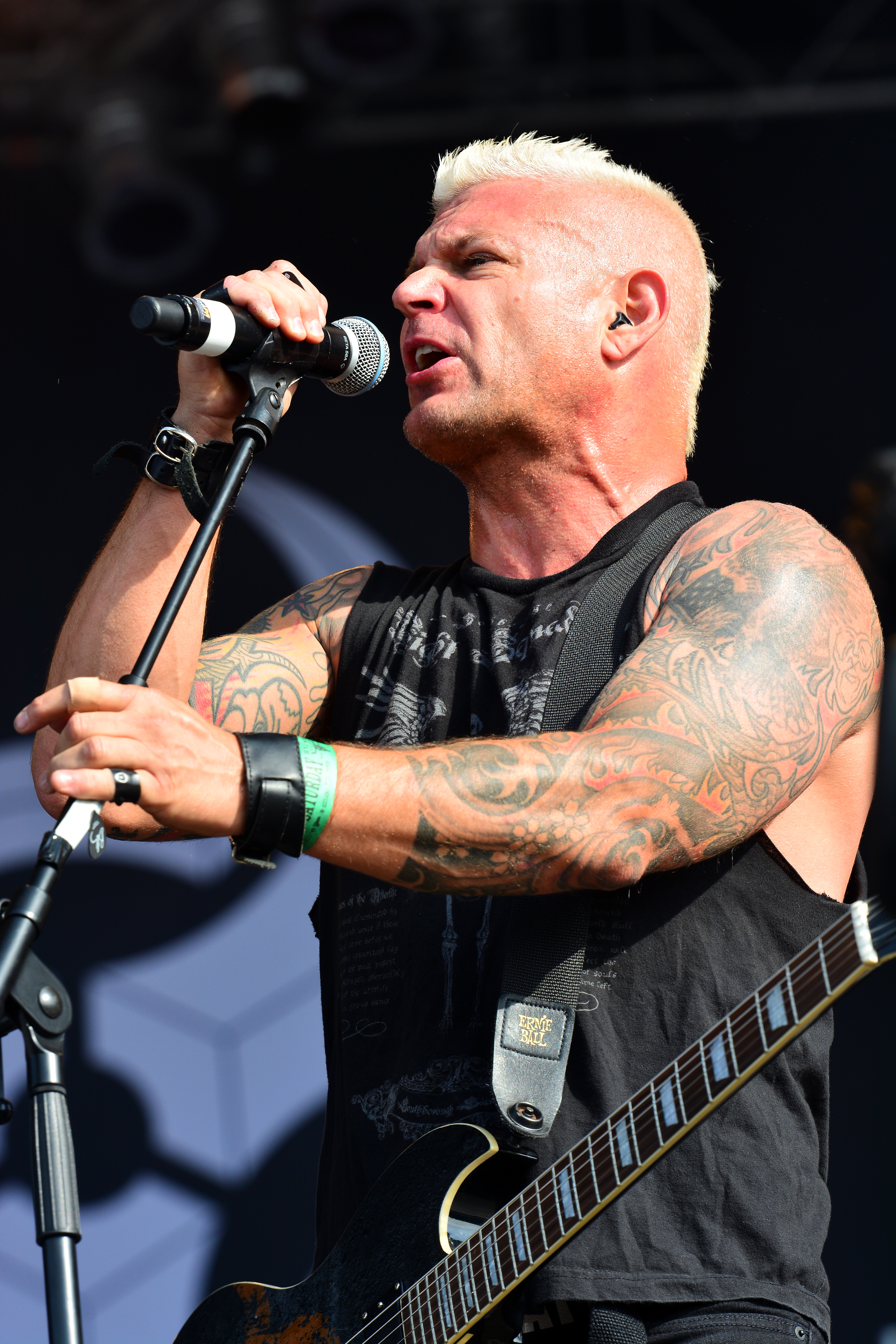
Graziadei in 2015

In 2000, the band renovated their rehearsal space creating a digital recording studio in Downtown Brooklyn, New York named Rat Piss Studios. In 2005, while working on Means to an End, their eighth studio album, the band opened the larger and less expensive Underground Sound Studios in South Amboy, New Jersey, leaving Rat Piss Studios behind. In 2010, Graziadei moved his recording space to Los Angeles changing its name to Firewater Studios.

=== Blu ===
Graziadei briefly formed a trip hop project named Blu with Jenifer Bair of the Ohio band Hilo. After writing and recording approximately twenty songs for the project, Bair relocated to Los Angeles to continue an art career and the project dissolved with all material, save for three demo tracks, remaining unreleased.

=== Suicide City ===
In 2004, Graziadei started Suicide City with Groovenics singer Karl Bernholtz, Groovenics/Ghost Fight guitarist A. J. Marchetta, Kittie bassist Jennifer Arroyo and New York drummer Danny Lamagna. He Later left the band in 2011.

=== RODEK ===
In 2004, he formed another side project called RODEK alongside Kittie bassist Jennifer Arroyo. They began recording material later that same year, releasing a video for their song "Undone".

In 2004, he appeared on the Brazilian metal band Endrah’s debut EP DEMONstration where he played guitar and provided vocals.

=== Roadrunner United ===
In December 2005, Graziadei and Evan Seinfeld performed Biohazard's "Punishment" with Dino Cazares of Fear Factory, Andreas Kisser of Sepultura, Adam Duce of Machine Head and Joey Jordison of Slipknot. This recording was released on the Roadrunner United: The Concert DVD three years later.

=== Blood for Blood ===
In 2010, Graziadei was selected by Boston hardcore band Blood for Blood to fill in for their former guitarist Rob Lind.

=== Powerflo ===
In 2017, Graziadei formed Powerflo, featuring lead vocalist Senen Reyes, better known as Sen Dog from Cypress Hill, lead guitarist Roy Lozano, bassist Christian Olde Wolbers, and drummer Fernando Schaefer. Graziadei is the band's rhythm guitarist and backing vocalist. The band's self-titled debut LP was released on June 23, 2017. A follow-up EP titled Bring That Shit Back followed in June 2018. In 2024, the group released their second studio album Gorilla Warfare.

=== BillyBio ===
In June 2018, it was announced that Graziadei was working on a studio album for his first solo project, BillyBio. The album, titled Feed the Fire, was released on November 30, 2018. BillyBio was asked to be the opening act for Life of Agony's Rise of the Underground tour in Europe October 2018. BillyBio joined Madball on tour for a few shows in early 2019. Graziadei and his solo project will head off to Europe at the end of May 2019, to play club dates and festivals, such as Antwerp Metal Fest in Belgium and Full Force Festival in Germany. Between 2020 and 2021, Graziadei, recorded and produced material for his second album at Firewater Studios in Los Angeles. The album Leaders And Liars was later released on March 23, 2022.

=== Viral ===
In October 2019, the industrial crossover project Viral released their first single Disorder. The band, formed around Graziadei and singer Frankie Cassara, embarked on a European tour as a support act for the German Industrial Metal band Die Krupps.

== Personal life ==
Graziadei has a daughter. He has been training in Brazilian Jiu-Jitsu for several years, holding a black belt in the art. He trains under UFC co-founder Rorion Gracie and his sons Ryron and Rener at their school in Torrance, California.

In 2020, Graziadei teamed up with Edward Davis and Angela Andrew to create Cru Sox, a sock company that donates a pair a socks to someone in need every time a pair are purchased. He has also been involved with other causes focusing on mental health, substance abuse and cancer research due to losing his mother from cancer when he was young.

On September 4, 2023, Graziadei made headlines after he saved a woman from drowning in the Kern River in California, after she fell out of raft and couldn't swim after hitting her head.

== Discography ==
Solo

- Feed the Fire (2018)
- Leaders And Liars (2022)

With Biohazard

- Main article: Biohazard discography

Suicide City

- Not My Year (EP) (2005)
- Frenzy (2009)

Endrah

- DEMONstration (2004)

Powerflo

- Powerflo (2017)
- Gorilla Warfare (2024)

Viral

- "Disorder" (2019)

== Production discography ==
Year	Artist	Work	Role
1994	Spudmonsters	Ace of Spades (EP)	Producer
2001	Biohazard	Uncivilization	Producer, composer, engineer
2002	Raging Speedhorn	We Will Be Dead Tomorrow	Co-producer
2005	Biohazard	Means to an End	Producer, engineer
2007	Full Blown Chaos	Heavy Lie the Crown	Producer, audio engineer, audio production, engineer, mixing
2007	No Hollywood Ending	Everybody's Talking	Producer, engineer
2008	Cold World	Dedicated To Babies Who Came Feet First	Producer, engineer
2009	Suicide City	Frenzy	Producer, engineer, mixing
2009	VTT	Symptoms of Sin	Producer
2014	Raimundos	Cantigas De Roda	Producer
2015	Brick By Brick	This World is my Enemy	Producer, mixing, editor
2017	Powerflo	Powerflo	Producer
2018	BillyBio	Feed The Fire	Producer
2018	Cutthroat	Cutthroat	Producer
2022	BilyBio	Leaders And Liars	Producer, engineer, mixing
2023	Cutthroat LA	Fear By Design	Producer, recording
2024	Powerflo	Gorilla Warfare	Producer
