= Boston hardcore =

Music scene

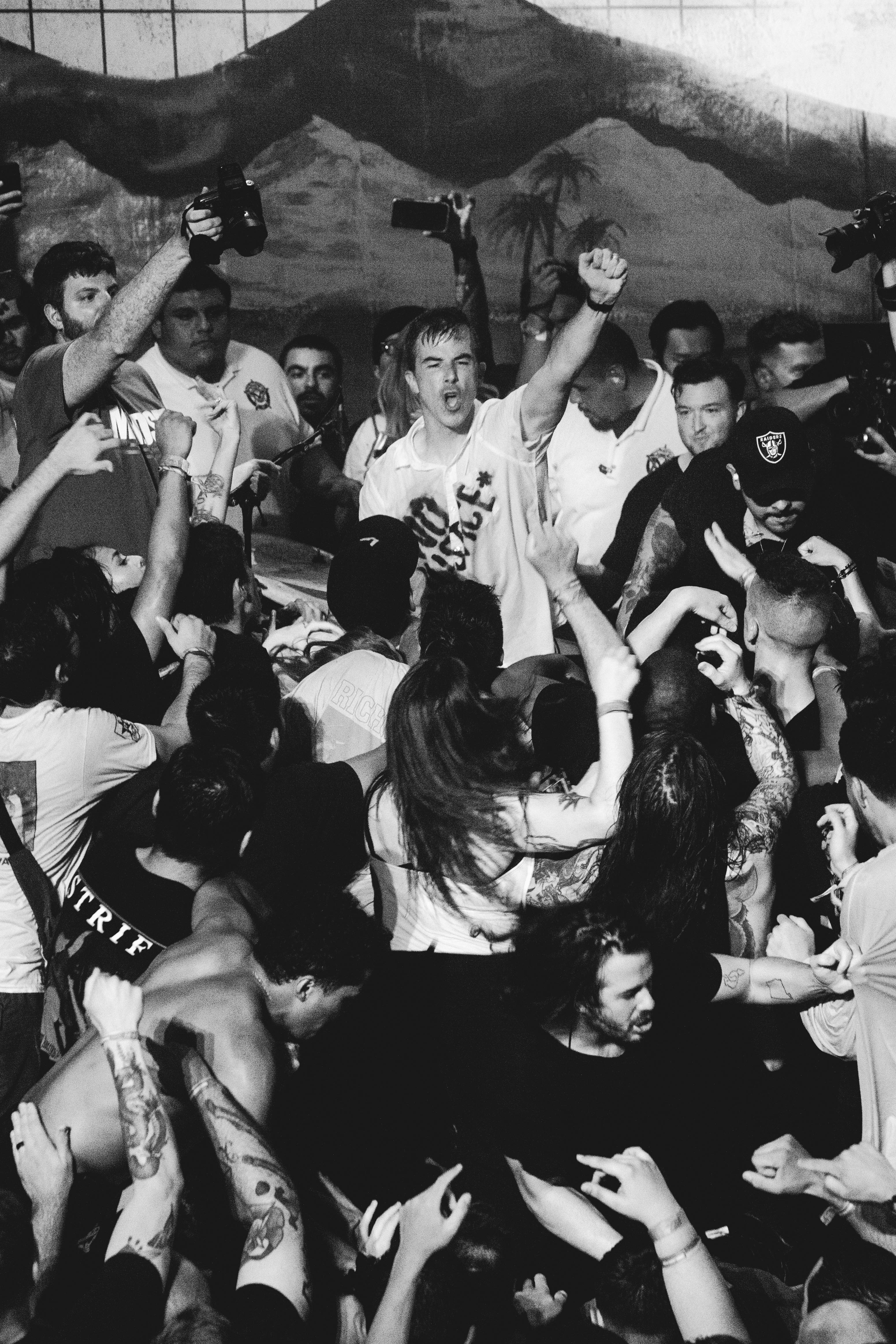
Boston band Have Heart's 2019 reunion show outside the Worcester Palladium had the highest attendance of any hardcore show in history.

Boston hardcore is the hardcore punk scene of Boston, Massachusetts. Beginning in the early 1980s, bands such as SSD, DYS, Jerry's Kids and Negative FX formed a nascent hardcore scene in the city that was notably captured on the compilation This Is Boston, Not L.A. (1982). By 1986, many of these bands had either disbanded or departed from the hardcore genre, instead beginning to play heavy metal. During the 1990s, the influence of extreme metal became prominent in the scene with Overcast, Converge, Cave In and Shadows Fall becoming prominent figures in the metalcore genre. However, a reaction against this metal influence quickly took place, which led to the mid-1990s youth crew revival of In My Eyes, Bane and Ten Yard Fight. By 2000, the youth crew revival had declined, and in response to its lyrical positivity, bands including American Nightmare, the Suicide File and the Hope Conspiracy began making music influenced by its music but centred on darker and nihilistic lyrics. In the following years, a reaction also took place against this lyrical style, which led to the rise of positive hardcore bands Mental and Have Heart. The 2000s also saw mainstream successful of Boston melodic metalcore bands including Killswitch Engage, All That Remains and Shadows Fall. Revolver noted that "Massachusetts has been one of hardcore's most fertile states as long as the genre has been around."

== 1980s ==
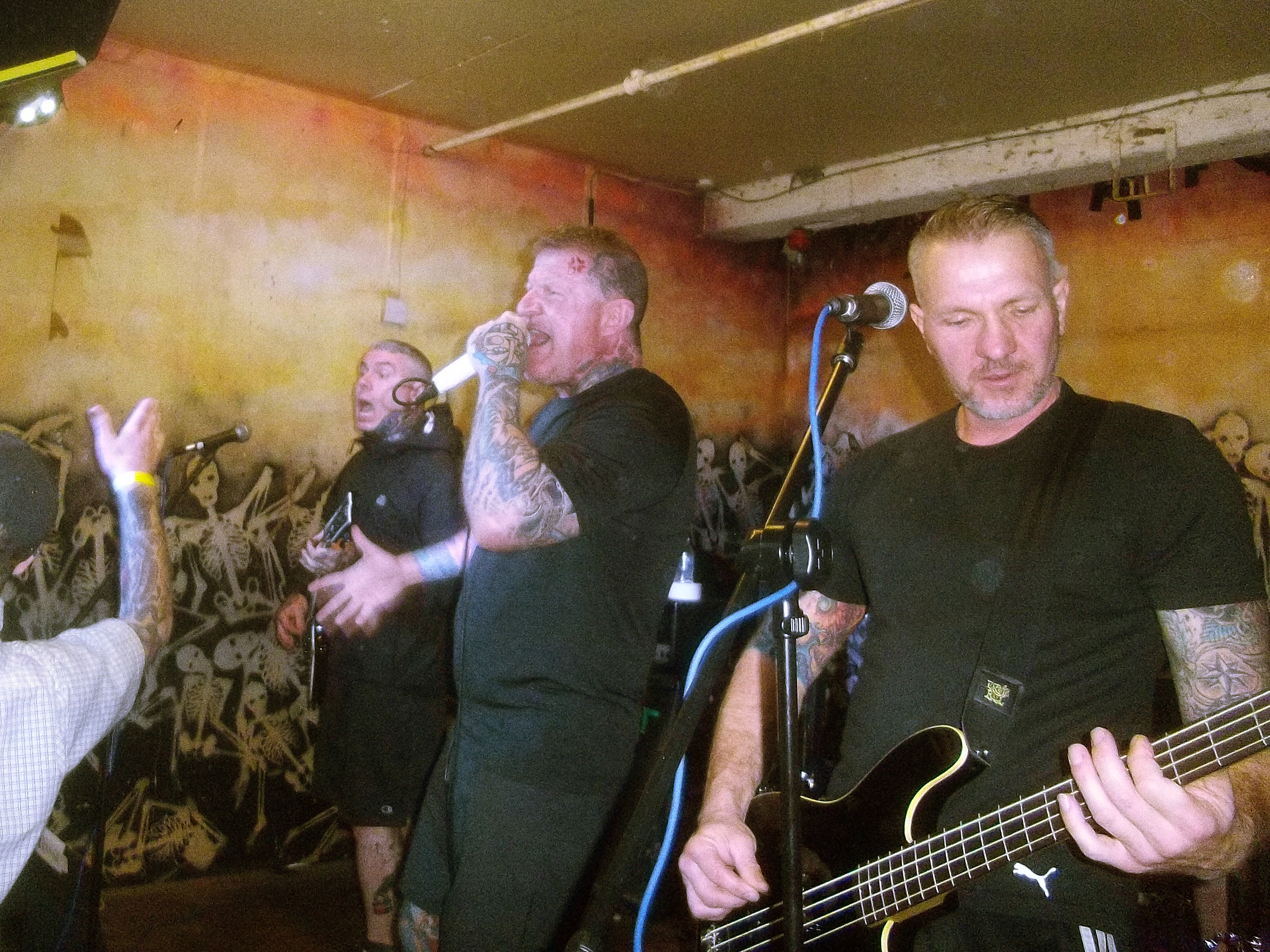
Slapshot was formed in 1985 by members of early Boston hardcore acts including Negative FX and DYS

Disheartened by Boston's local punk bands like Mission of Burma and the Neighbourhoods, and feeling enfranchised by straight edge after watching Minor Threat perform in New York City, Boston's first hardcore band was SSD. Formed in 1981 and performing live for the first time on September 19 of the same year, SSD influenced the formation of a Boston hardcore scene. The groups of bands especially influenced by SSD and their straight edge philosophy called themselves the Boston Crew, which included DYS and Negative FX, while other early bands to join the scene included Jerry's Kids, the F.U.'s, Gang Green and the Freeze. The Proletariat, although a part of this scene were set apart significantly due to their jangle pop guitars, influence from Gang of Four and Wire and communist lyrics. In 1982, Modern Method Records released This Is Boston, Not L.A., a compilation album of the Boston hardcore scene. In addition to Modern Method was Taang! Records, who released material by a number of the aforementioned Boston hardcore bands. Gang Green went on to become one of the most successful bands of this era having multiple music videos appear on MTV programming, AllMusic stated that the band are "Far and away the biggest name to emerge from the Boston hardcore scene."

Despite writing a mere 20 minutes of music and never playing outside of New England, Siege became highly influential. Their tracks on Cleanse the Bacteria exposed them to wide audiences, including Lars Ulrich of Metallica, who described them as the fastest band he had ever heard. Numerous pioneering bands establishing the death metal and grindcore subgenres in the 1980s cited Siege as a formative influence, including British groups Carcass and Napalm Death. Further outside of Boston were Western Massachusetts bands Deep Wound (which featured future Dinosaur Jr. members J Mascis and Lou Barlow) and the Outpatients, both of whom would come to Boston to play shows. From nearby Manchester, New Hampshire was G.G. Allin, a solo singer who contrary to straight edge used large amounts of drugs and alcohol, eventually dying of a heroin overdose. Allin's stage show included defecating on stage and then throwing his feces at the audience. At this time, a prominent venue was the Gallery East.

By 1986, the scene was in decline, SSD, DYS and the F.U.'s has begun to play heavy metal, with the lattermost doing so also changing their name to Straw Dogs. By the end of the year, both SSD and DYS had disbanded. Members of the Boston Crew then went on to form the band Slapshot. The members of ska punk band the Mighty Mighty Bosstones also originated from this scene. Slapshot have been credited by the Eagle Online as being one of the driving forces in the resurrection of hardcore in the Boston area, when all the other bands moved away from the genre. Stewart Marson of AllMusic wrote on their 1990 album Sudden Death Overtime stating “At a time when hardcore itself, never mind straight-edge, was on the ropes, Sudden Death Overtime proved that some bands were still in the game.”

== 1990s ==
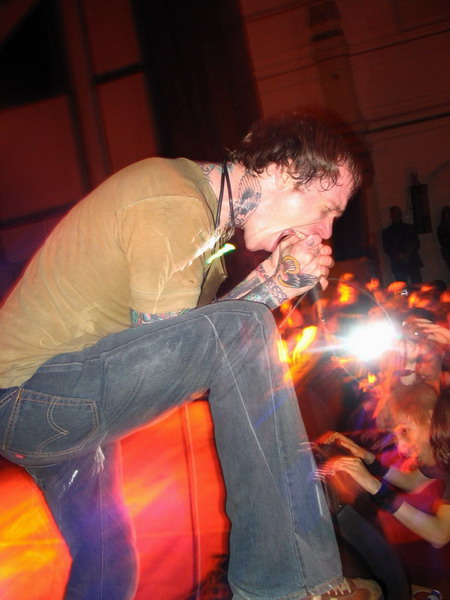
Converge are an influential band in the metalcore genre

In the early 1990s, Only Living Witness and Sam Black Church gained national attention during a time when New York hardcore dominated the scene. Both bands also incorporated elements of metal to their hardcore sound. At the same time, an early metalcore developed in Boston, led by Overcast who formed in 1990. Much of this scene were based around Hydra Head Records, which was founded by Aaron Turner after moving to Boston. Converge were one of the earliest and most prominent groups from the city, formed in 1990. Using Rorschach's music as their sonic template, the band's experimental attitude, emotional lyrics and attention to dynamics led to them becoming one of the most influential bands in the genre. Blood for Blood was formed in 1994, and were known for their live performances being violent due to the audience getting into large brawls and riots. This resulted in the band having a large police presence at their shows.

As a reaction against the dominance of metal-influenced hardcore amongst straight edge bands, around 1996, a revival of the sound of the youth crew bands began. Bands including In My Eyes, Bane, Ten Yard Fight and Floorpunch, used the key aspects of late 1980s bands such as the gang vocals, high tempos and lyrical themes of straight edge, unity and vegetarianism.

In 1997, the Rathskeller, a prominent venue in the scene was closed and the building was demolished, hosting acts such as Blood for Blood. In a 2014 article by Vice Media, writer John Liam Policastro called it "Boston's legendary shithole".

As the 1990s drew to a close, a wave of metalcore bands began incorporating elements of melodic death metal into their sound. This formed an early version of what would become the melodic metalcore genre. The first band to make use of this fusion was Overcast, who were soon followed by Shadows Fall on Somber Eyes to the Sky and Unearth on Above the Fall of Man (1999).

== 2000s ==
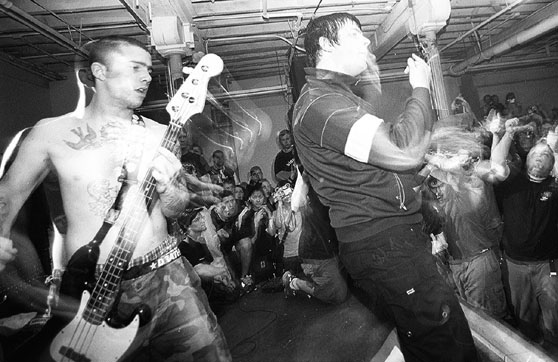
American Nightmare's music was rooted in youth crew, but the band's negative, poetic lyrics of self-loathing were inspired by groups like the Smiths

By 1999 and 2000, the youth crew revival was in decline, with Ten Yard Fight, In My Eyes and Floorpunch all disbanding. As a reaction against the homogeneity and simplicity that scene had developed, Ten Yard Fight guitarist Tim Cossar and the band's roadie Wesley Eisold formed American Nightmare. Although still musically rooted in the youth crew revival, the band's negative, poetic lyrics of self-loathing were inspired by groups like the Smiths. American Nightmare's influence was apparent promptly in their home of Boston, then expanded nationally with the release of their 2001 debut album Background Music, being followed by a wave of bands including Ceremony, Ruiner, Modern Life Is War and Killing the Dream. A 2011 article by Lambgoat called Boston bands American Nightmare, the Hope Conspiracy and the Suicide File as three bands who in particular "left a noteworthy mark" in the scene.

A reaction against this movement also took place, which began with Mental, who were quickly followed by Have Heart. Have Heart's success led to the rise in popularity of other positive hardcore groups like Champion, Verse and Sinking Ships, and the rise in prominence of Bridge 9 Records. In an AllMusic review, Greg Prato wrote about the label's band Energy that "While you wouldn't go quite as far as calling Energy "a hardcore boy band," the group's leanings toward the mainstream are undeniable throughout Invasions of the Mind. Death Before Dishonor formed in 2000, and began making a name for themselves through extensive touring averaging 250 live performances a year by the late 2000s headlining worldwide in Australia, Europe, Mexico, and Canada.

Defeater formed in Boston in 2008. The band went on to be one of the forefront acts in the Wave, a movement of post-hardcore bands in the late 2000s and early 2010s. Their discography narrates an overarching story of a working class New Jersey family in the Post-World War II Era.

=== Metalcore ===
At the beginning of the 2000s, many of the bands from Boston's 1990s metalcore scene began becoming increasingly experimental, with Cave In starting to make progressive music and Aaron Turner's post-metal band Isis emerging from the scene. Metal Hammer writer Stephen Hill called Jane Doe by Converge "the high watermark of the Boston scene [in this era]". Around this time, many of these acts gained international mainstream attention, with Cave In signing to the major label Capitol Records and touring with the Foo Fighters.

Converge's album was released on 4 September 2001 to universal critical and fan acclaim. The album influenced the development of the sound of other U.S. bands like Norma Jean and Misery Signals as well as international acts like Eden Maine, Johnny Truant and Beecher. Blake Butler of Allmusic stated that Converge "put the final sealing blow on their status as a legend in the world of metallic hardcore" with the album, calling it "an experience -- an encyclopedic envelopment of so much at once." Terrorizer Magazine named it their 2001 Album of the Year, and it was named the greatest album of the 2000s by Noisecreep and Sputnikmusic

==== Melodic metalcore ====
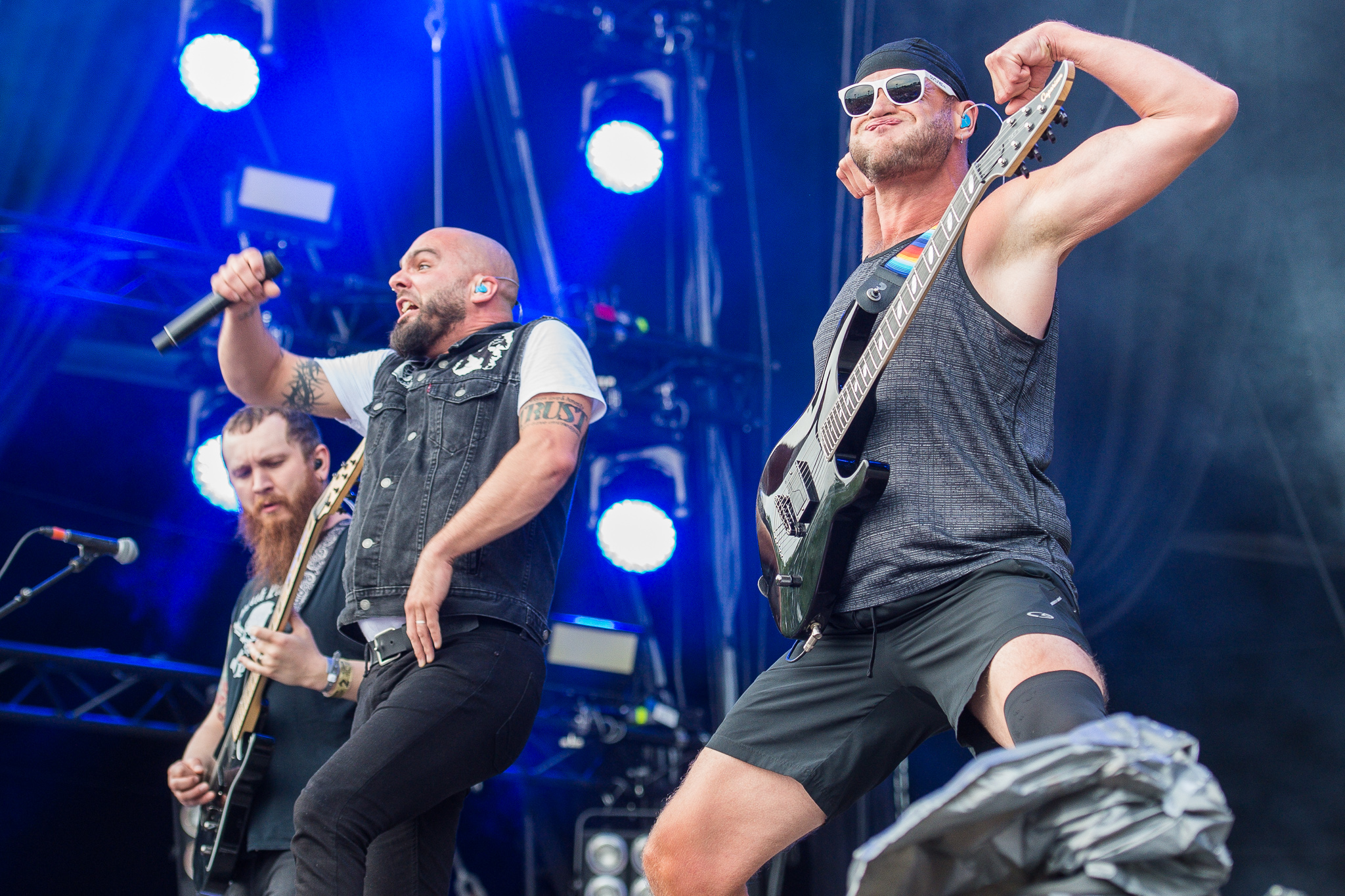
Killswitch Engage received significant commercial success with their melodic metalcore sound

By the 2000s, the melodic death metal-influenced style of metalcore had become increasingly prominent, with this bands soon separating themselves into their own scene, which Converge vocalist Jacob Bannon referred to as the "commercial metalcore scene". This scene was fronted by Killswitch Engage, Shadows Fall and Unearth. In 2002, Killswitch Engage's Alive or Just Breathing reached number 37 on the Heatseekers Albums chart. In 2004, Killswitch Engage's The End of Heartache, Shadows Fall's The War Within, Killswitch Engage's 2004 album The End of Heartache has been certified gold by the Recording Industry Association of America and their 2006 album As Daylight Dies was certified platinum by the Recording Industry Association of America (RIAA) in 2007 and 2021, respectively. Killswitch Engage's 2002 album Alive or Just Breathing, as of 3 July 2004, has sold 114,000 copies in the United States. Their album is a landmark album for the genre, being considered a foundational and highly influential record that helped define the metalcore in its early years. The band also became the first to receive a Grammy nomination for Best Metal Performance at the 47th annual Grammy awards in 2005.

Shadows Fall began to pick up in popularity with their 2002 album The Art of Balance with his since surpassed 100,000 plus sales. Their follow up 2004 album seen even more success peaking at number 20 on the Billboard 200 along with topping the Independent Album Charts, and has since sold 200,00 units. They also picked up two Grammy nods for Best Metal Performance in 2006 and 2008 respectively.

Unearth began to have success among heavy metal fans in 2004 with the release of their second album The Oncoming Storm, which peaked at number 1 on the Heatseekers Albums chart on 17 July 2004. On that same day, the album peaked at number 105 on the Billboard 200. Unearth's 2006 album III: In the Eyes of Fire peaked at number 35 on the Billboard 200. The band's 2008 album The March peaked at number 45 on the Billboard 200. Oncoming Storm, III: In the Eyes of Fire', and The March peaked at numbers 6, 2 and 3 on the Independent Albums chart, respectively. All That Remains achieved success with their 2006 album The Fall of Ideals, which, as of 1 October 2025, sold 500,00 copies in the United States. All That Remains' 2008 album Overcome peaked at number 16 on the Billboard 200 and has also sold roughly 500,000 copies. Overcome's song "Two Weeks" peaked at number 9 on the Mainstream Rock Songs chart on 16 May 2009.

== 2010s ==
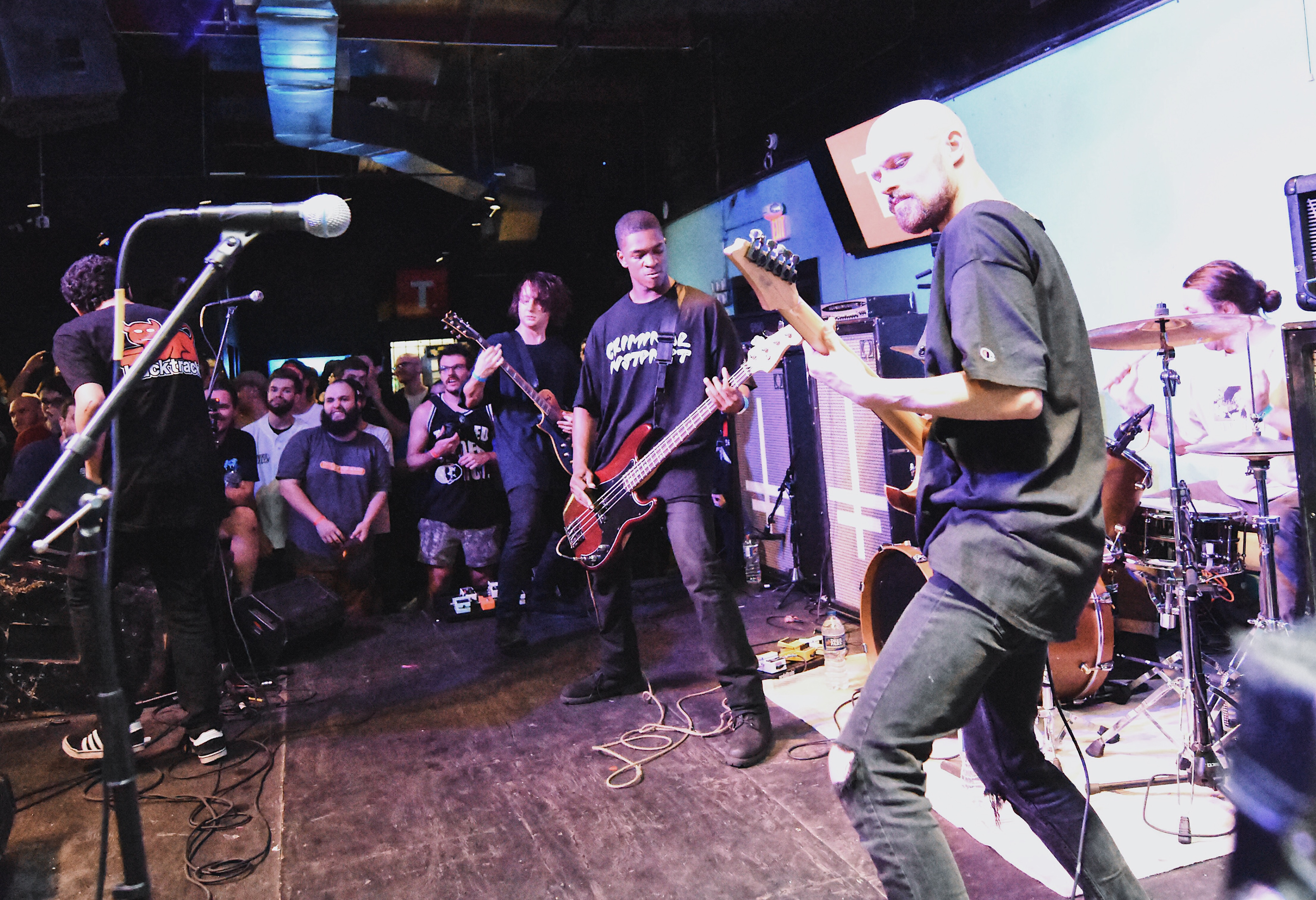
Vein.fm became one of the new prominent names during the 2010s

During the 2010s the Boston's Triple B Records became the most prolific and important new label in hardcore, spotlighting regional, national and international groups to the rise of present-day hardcore mainstays like Vein.fm, Fiddlehead and Fuming Mouth, who are all Massachusetts based bands. Fiddlehead, formed in 2014 by former members of Have Heart and English band Basement, become one of the faces of melodic hardcore and post-hardcore in the city. Vein.fm gained prominence in the national hardcore scene during the 2010s for their fusion of 1990s style metalcore, with nu metal. Kerrang called them "the most explosive live act in hardcore today" and Metal Hammer called them "the group on a mission to push hardcore forward". More traditional hardcore bands such as Boston Strangler, The Rival Mob, Restraining Order and Risk also began receiving praise from multiple publications throughout the 2010s.

On August 29, 2010, legacy acts DYS and The F.U.'s reunited and played their first shows in 25 years at Gallery East in front of over 1,000 fans alongside Jerry's Kids and Gang Green. The show was in support of xxx ALL AGES xxx, a documentary about the original hardcore punk scene in Boston in the early 1980s, being produced in association with Stone Films NYC. American Nightmare also reformed in 2011.

Metalcore and melodic metalcore continued its success into the following decade bands like Killswitch Engage, Converge and All That Remains continued to their success. Killswitch Engage's 2013 Disarm the Descent album peaked at number 7 on the Billboard 200 and their 2016 album Incarnate achieved their highest debut ever at number 6. The group also picked up another 2 Grammy nominations for Best Metal performance in 2014 and 2020 respectively. Converge only released two albums during the 2010s however both of them achieved their highest appearances on the Billboard 200.

All That Remains 2010 album For We Are Many debuted at number 10 on the Billboard 200 and topped the Billboard Hard Rock chart. With all 3 singles reaching the top 10 of the Mainstream Rock Charts. They then shifted to a more hard rock sound with their 2012 album A War You Cannot Win, which produced the single Stand Up which reached number 1 on the Mainstream Rock Charts. The album has since sold over 120,000 copies. Unearth continued to release new material and Shadows Fall went on hiatus in 2015.

In 2018, Slapshot released their final studio album Make America Hate Again.

== 2020s ==
In 2023, Revolver published an article highlighting seven bands leading the state's new wave of hardcore, including Adrienne, Anklebiter, Burning Lord, C4, Move BHC, Restraining Order and Risk. Adrienne and Anklebiter later disbanded in 2024. Additional bands associated with the era include Haywire, Final Gasp, Hard Target, Blood Tithe, Buried Dreams, Grasp and Street Power, many of whom became prominent within the New England DIY touring circuit. Haywire gained wider recognition through extensive international touring during the decade, including a 2025 European tour with Dropkick Murphys. In 2026, Haywire and Dropkick Murphys released the collaborative split LP New England Forever, featuring original songs and covers from both bands.

The decade saw wider recognition for Fleshwater, a spinoff featuring members of Vein.fm, whose blend of alternative metal and shoegaze gained mainstream attention through touring and festival appearances.

The decade saw the return of several influential legacy acts. Blood for Blood reunited during the 2020s and signed a deal with Roadrunner Records ahead of their first new material in over two decades. Shadows Fall reunited in 2021, and released new material for the first time in over a decade in 2024. Slapshot announced their retirement in 2025, and embarked on a farewell tour.

== Culture ==
=== Straight edge ===
Straight edge has long been impactful on Boston hardcore. The ideology came to Boston after the members of the Boston Crew saw Black Flag at Irving Plaza in New York City. There, they met Henry Rollins who told them about straight edge. On their drive back to Boston, the members of the crew decided they "were going to make a conscious decision to take on this whole straight edge thing". Boston hardcore musicians and took a more militant stance to the ideology. In Tony Rettman's book Straight Edge A Clear-Headed Hardcore Punk History (2017), multiple proponents say that although straight edge was first thought of in Washington D.C., it was "solidified" as an ideology in Boston. The band Slapshot and their debut album Back on the Map which was released in 1985, both made significant contributions to the rise of straight edge ideology in Boston. With their lyrics being described as “the crux of the straight edge movement’s beliefs” in Boston.

Straight edge remained prominent in Boston, with straight edge members being a part of Converge, Have Heart, American Nightmare, All That Remains and Killswitch Engage. It experienced a major resurgence in the 1990s with youth crew revival bands such as In My Eyes, Bane and Ten Yard Fight.

=== Moshing ===
In the 1980s, the Boston scene made heavy use of slam dancing, influenced by that found in the Los Angeles and Washington D.C. scene, however more violent, incorporating punching below the neck, a style called the "Boston thrash" or "punching penguins". Another style of moshing common was "pig piles" in which one person was pushed to the ground and others would begin to pile on top of them. This originated during a D.O.A. set, and was initiated by SSD vocalist Al Barile.

During the 1990s, Boston hardcore show attracted increased violence, with a 2014 article by Vice Media recalling that "It was not uncommon to see pool balls in handkerchiefs, chains, and even cinderblocks in the hands of fans as they kicked the crap out of each other".

In 2012, the Boston Police Department released a statement announcing that they would crack down on moshing during live events. This came following a performance by Flogging Molly at Boston's House of Blues on February 21 of the same year where sixty concertgoers moshed, during which one person was knocked to the ground and received a concussion. In reference to the event, Boston police spokeswoman Officer Nicole Grant stated "Dancing is a First Amendment right, but the behavior itself is a violation, especially when it becomes dangerous and a public safety hazard". On March 13, an article was published in the Boston Herald, where members of the Red Chord, Shadows Fall, Dropkick Murphys and Unearth criticised this decision. On 2 April, the person who was concussed was interviewed by the blog Punk Rock Pravada, in which he stated he didn't agree with the police department's decision, and that he believed "Boston is just asking people to stop pumping money into their clubs".

=== FSU ===
Friends Stand United (FSU) formed in Boston in the 1980s in an attempt to expel neo-Nazis from the scene. By the end of the decade it had succeeded in this goal.

In the late 1990s, Elgin James, a musician involved in the militant faction of the Boston straight edge scene, helped revive FSU. By the early 2000s, there were FSU chapters in Philadelphia, Chicago, Arizona, Los Angeles, Seattle, upstate New York and New Jersey, and they were considered to have about 200 members. The Federal Bureau of Investigation eventually classified FSU as a street gang, which used violent methods and repeatedly assault people at hardcore shows and on Boston streets. In conjunction with the gang activities, James eventually did time in jail for extortion. The group released two Boston Beatdown movies featuring interviews with members, fights and live performances by bands.

FSU members were present in bands including Death Before Dishonor, Ramallah and Blood for Blood.

== See also ==
- All Ages: The Boston Hardcore Film
