= Greatest Hits, Slashes and Crosschecks =

Compilation album by Slapshot
- Released: 2001 (November)
- Genre: Hardcore punk
- Length: 51:57
- Label: Century Media/Bridge 9

Slapshot chronology
Old Tyme Hardcore (1996)	Greatest Hits, Slashes and Crosschecks (2001)	Digital Warfare (2003)

Greatest Hits, Slashes and Crosschecks is a compilation album by the American hardcore band Slapshot. It contains 22 songs and was released by Century Media in Germany in 2001. It was released in the U.S. by Bridge 9 Records the following year. The album was reissued by Street Justice Records in 2018 featuring new cover art.

== Background ==
This album was the first that band had recorded in five years. During that time the band almost disbanded; however, this album marked a comeback. It is a collection of re-recordings of some of the band's more well-known tracks, along with two brand new ones, "Crossover Sucks" and "Shoot Charlton Heston".

Of the 22 tracks on the album, seven come from the band's first two records. Five come from Sudden Death Overtime, four more 16 Valve Hate, and the rest are made up from tracks on "Old Tyme Hardcore", "Unconsciousness", and "Blast Furnace".

The CD included live video performances of their songs "Step On It" / "Chip on My Shoulder" and "Olde Time Hardcore" / "Silence" with "Old Tyme Hardcore". Along with this it included a collection of flyers for the band's various performances and extensive liner notes including a booklet that contained the history of the band.

== Critical reception ==
Professional ratings
Review scores
Source	Rating
AllMusic	2.5/5 stars
Aversionline	Favorable
Ox-fanzine	4/5 stars
Punk News	3.5/5 stars
Rough Edge	3/5 stars

Kurt Morris of AllMusic wrote "The music on this album surely shows what they have accomplished, although people not familiar with the band may have a hard time understanding their importance in the face of the multiple number of other current Boston hardcore acts with a similar sound. Nonetheless, fans of Slapshot and old-school hardcore fans owe it to themselves to pick this up." Ox-fanzine wrote "If you want to get an overview of the SLAPSHOT chaining, especially the nineties, you've come to the right place - they didn't get any better afterwards. And yes, essential songs like "Step on it" and "No friend of mine" from the 1988 debut "Step On It" and "Back On The Map".

== Track listing ==
All tracks are written by Slapshot.

New tracks
No.	Title	Length
1.	"Crossover Sucks"	2:17
2.	"Shoot Charlton Heston"	1:22

Re-recordings
No.	Title	Length
1.	"Firewalker"	2:23
2.	"Chip On My Shoulder"	2:29
3.	"Say Goodbye"	2:40
4.	"What's at Stake"	3:18
5.	"I've Had Enough"	1:36
6.	"Punk's Dead"	1:59
7.	"Day My Thoughts"	1:44
8.	"Back on the Map"	2:53
9.	"Step On It"	2:16
10.	"No Time Left"	2:16
11.	"No Friend of Mine"	1:45
12.	"Hang Up Your Boots"	2:47
13.	"In Your Face"	2:42
14.	"Another Mistake"	2:40
15.	"Watch Me Bleed"	2:19
16.	"Loser"	2:36
17.	"Secrets"	2:06
18.	"16 Valve Hate"	3:52
19.	"Old Tyme Hardcore"	1:24
20.	"Silence"	2:28
Total length:		51:57

== Personnel ==
Slapshot

- Jack "Choke" Kelly – lead vocals
- Mike Bowser – guitar
- David Link – bass
- Mark Mckay – drums

Technical personnel

- D. Kelly – composer
- James Siegel – engineer, mixing
- Jack Kelly – producer
- Aubrey Arago, Sandra Steh and Laura Black – photography, video
- Mad Marc – liner notes
- Anthony "Wrench" Moreschi – enhanced CD design
