= Back on the Map (EP) =

EP by Slapshot
- Released: 1985
- Studio: Audio Matrix, Cambridge, Massachusetts
- Genre: Thrashcore, hardcore punk
- Length: 18:41
- Label: Taang!
- Producer: George Hicks

Slapshot chronology
Back on the Map (1985)	Step on It (1988)

Back on the Map is debut release by American hardcore band Slapshot. It was originally released in 1985 as an Ep on Taang! Records. However it has since been reissued in various formats. The record is said to have "played a crucial role and factor in defining what became known as Boston hardcore."

== Background ==
It is the only record to feature the entire original line up which consisted of Jack “Choke” Kelly, Jonathan Anastas, Mark McKay, and Steve Risteen. Unlike other hardcore acts Slapshot decided to make their first album a 24 track recording as opposed to the regular 8 to 16-track hardcore album. To reduce costs, they recorded the entire record at night and completed it in just four sessions. They also decided to record on 24 tracks instead of the typical recording on 8 or 16 tracks, which led to the Ep having a dynamic sound."

The album’s track listing varies, originally released as a 12” EP by Taang!, between later editions, some cases of CD/LP reissues include bonus tracks.

In 1988 Taang! released a compilation album titled Step on It/Back on the Map which featured both Back on the Map and their first full-length album Step on It.

== Reception and legacy ==
Elpida Baphomet of Metal Invader wrote "Sonically, the album is simple, but carries a sense of urgency. Songs like the title track “Back on the Map”, “Addiction” and “Where There’s Smoke” showcase the band's signature combination of dynamic, mosh-ready riffs and catchy vocal hooks that easily become sing-alongs. The short, snappy songs, the careful arrangements and the choruses that make you want to raise your fist are the album's key points."

Around the time of Back on the Map release many Boston hardcore bands such as SSD were moving more towards heavy metal. So with this release Slapshot aimed to revive the hardcore ethos of the area hence the records name Back on the Map. This feat was greatly helped by reputations of its members as they had all previously been in prominent hardcore bands in the Boston area such as Negative FX, Terminally Ill and DYS. Historically, the album is said to have played a crucial role and factor in what is now known as the Boston hardcore scene with the lyrics and mindset resonating with a local scene at the time. In addition Ava Ackerman of Taste Makers Magazine wrote that the EP greatly contributed to straight edge movement in the Boston hardcore scene.

== Track listing ==
All tracks are written by Jack Kelly.

No.	Title	Length
1.	"Back on the Map"	3:03
2.	"Addiction"	3:07
3.	"Where There’s Smoke?"	1:36
4.	"It’s Happening Today?"	2:23
5.	"Chip On My Shoulder"	2:40
6.	"Moment Of Truth"	1:28
7.	"Hardcore Rules"	4:26

Reissue bonus tracks
No.	Title	Length
8.	"Same Mistake"	2:58
9.	"Might Makes Right"	1:50
10.	"Gilligan"	0:54

== Personnel ==
- Jack "Choke" Kelly — vocals
- Jonathan Anastas — bass
- Steve Risteen — guitar
- Mark McKay — drums

Production

- George Hicks — producer and engineer
- Curtis Casella — executive producer
