= Olde Tyme Hardcore =

1996 album by Slapshot

Old Tyme Hardcore

Studio album by Slapshot
- Released: 1996
- Genre: Hardcore punk
- Length: 25:40
- Label: Century Media/Tang

Slapshot chronology
16 Valve Hate (1995)	Old Tyme Hardcore (1996)	Greatest Hits, Slashes And Crosschecks (2001)

Old Tyme Hardcore is the fifth studio album by the American hardcore band Slapshot. It was originally released in Germany and Europe in 1996 via Century Media Records. It was then later released in the United States by Tang Records.

== Background ==
Following a 1995 European tour in support of 16 Valve Hate, the band returned to America and started writing material for a new album. The album was officially recorded in 1996 for Tang Records however German label Century Media wanted to put it out in Europe resulting in Slapshot singing with them. The album was later released in the U.S. by Tang with a different layout however both versions featured an untitled bonus track.

The album was a return to a more "old-school" hardcore sound and features a cover of the SSD track Get It Away. The album starts with a clip from the '70s hockey movie that gave Slapshot their band name.

The album title is a reference to multiple things: it nods to hockey, Boston’s Revolutionary War–themed tourist culture, and to the idea that their hardcore sound was already considered old-fashioned at the time.

At the time of the album's release various reports stated lead singer disbanded the group the day after the album's release citing “the idiocy of a scene that is increasingly predominated by college frat boys who will mosh to anything that even closely resembles punk.” However the group still went on tours and eventually released a compilation album in 2001.

== Reception ==
Professional ratings
Review scores
Source	Rating
AllMusic	3.5/5 stars
Visions.de	8/12 stars
Ox-fanzine	Positive
Lollipop Magazine	Favorable

German music review Visions.de wrote "Olde Tyme Hardcore" contains nothing really new; in just 27 minutes, the Boston band manages to present their entire understanding of hardcore. What's nice about it is their simple and honest style, which always lets you know where you stand right away."

Joachim Hiller of Ox-fanzine gave the album a positive review stating “Musically, little has changed in the nine songs here: straightforward, brutal Sturm & Drang core in the familiar SLAPSHOT style.” Adding “ The album title and lyrics of the title track, demonstrate what the Boston band thinks of people who think SLAPSHOT's best days are behind them.”

== Track listing ==
All tracks are written by Jack Kelly, Chris Lauria and Mark Mckay.

No.	Title	Length
1.	"Slapshot intro"	0:47
2.	"Old Tyme Hardcore"	1:21
3.	"Lip Service"	2:30
4.	"Silence"	2:30
5.	"Pennies From Heaven"	1:53
6.	"What’s In My Head"	2:03
7.	"What’s On Your Mind"	2:14
8.	"Get It Away" (SSD Cover)	2:53
9.	"If You Had"	1:58
10.	"I Knew I’d Lose"	4:55
Total length:		25:40

Germany Bonus Track
No.	Title	Length
12.	"Untitled" (Sometimes referred to as “Swedish Whoreshow”)	4:55

== Personnel ==
Slapshot

- Jack "Choke" Kelly – lead vocals
- Mike Bowser – guitar
- Chris Lauria – bass
- Mark Mckay – drums

Technical personnel

- Arthur Johnston – composer
- Rudy De Doncker – photography
