= Works with titles derived from Make America Great Again =

"Make America Great Again" is an American political slogan, most recently popularized by Donald Trump during his presidential campaigns. Derivatives of the slogan, some of which are satirical, include:

== Music ==
- Make America Crip Again, 2017 EP by Snoop Dogg
- Make America Hate Again, 2018 studio album by Slapshot
- Make America Psycho Again, 2015 remix album by Fall Out Boy
- Make America Rock Again, 2017 concert tour by Scott Stapp
- Make America Great Again (song), 2016 song by Pussy Riot
- Make America Slime Again Tour, 2025 concert tour by YoungBoy Never Broke Again

== Television ==
- Make Rebecca Great Again, episode of Ted Lasso

== Visual arts ==
- Make Everything Great Again, mural in Vilnius, Lithuania
- Make America Wait Again, sculpture of Elon Musk

== See also ==
- List of things named after Donald Trump
- Donald Trump in popular culture
