= Tear It Down (Slapshot EP) =

EP by Slapshot
- Released: 15 February 2005
- Genre: Hardcore punk
- Length: 18:16
- Label: Spook City/Thorp
- Producer: Killswitch productions

Slapshot chronology
Digital Warfare (2003)	Tear It Down (2005)	I Believe (2012)

Tear It Down is an EP by the American hardcore band Slapshot. It was released on February 15, 2005, via Spook City and Thorp Records.

The Thorp version of the release contained extra content including a 15-minute video consisting of interviews and the band's recording process, two live recordings of their songs "Firewalker" and "Step on It" along with a brief trailer for the band's documentary which was released the following year in 2006.

== Controversy ==
Tear It Down contains the song "Fuck New York" which makes fun of numerous things related to the state such as Manhattan, former Yankees manager Joe Torre, Sex and the City, Broadway and Times Square. However, this song caused some controversy due to the lyrics mentioning the September 11 attacks. Lead singer Jack Kelly later issued an apology to the city of New York and their hardcore scene in 2012.

== Critical reception ==
Professional ratings
Review scores
Source	Rating
AllMusic	3.5/5 stars
Punknews	2.5/5 stars
Ox-fanzine	7/10
Lambgoat	4/10
Lollipop Magazine	Favorable

Tear It Down received mixed reception from critics. Stewart Mason of AllMusic gave the EP a positive review stating "lyricist Jack Kelly sounds re-energized throughout, and the band is equally on fire". He described the EP as one of Slapshot's "most serious and politically minded releases focusing on wartime paranoia in 'Spread the Fear' and 'Terrorized' and calling the hardcore troops to the battle in 'Relight the Fire'.

Adam White of Punknews gave the band credit stating "Slapshot sounds as determined and furious as ever." In a negative review by Jhonn Thomassen of Lambgoat, he claimed "The major flaw with this record is that it just doesn't hold up to all the previous Slapshot material out there."

== Track listing ==
All tracks are written by Jack Kelly.

No.	Title	Length
1.	"Relight the Fire"	2:08
2.	"Fuck New York"	3:21
3.	"Terrorized"	2:45
4.	"Rap Sucks"	2:01
5.	"Tear It Down"	1:44
6.	"Spread the Fear"	3:43
7.	"Hardcore Rules"	2:41
Total length:		29:39

== Personnel ==
- Chris Lauria – bass
- Jack "Choke" Kelly – lead vocals
- Ed Lalli – guitar
- Mark McKay – drums

Technical

- Killswitch Productions — production
- Brett (15) — mastering
- Seth Farrell — engineering
- John Bean — engineering
- Orion Landau — design
