= Jonathan Anastas =

- Born: Boston, Massachusetts
- Education: University of Massachusetts, Amherst (BA); University of Pennsylvania, Wharton School, (Executive MBA)
- Occupations: Gaming, entertainment, media, marketing, and sports executive, musician

Jonathan Anastas is an American gaming, entertainment, media, marketing, and sports executive and musician.

== Early life and education ==
Anastas grew up in Gloucester and Marblehead then spent his teenage years in Cambridge, Massachusetts. His father, Peter Anastas, was a writer.

Anastas attended Cambridge Rindge and Latin School and the University of Massachusetts Amherst, where he studied political science and economics and served as student attorney general. He became interested in marketing and advertising after working on student political campaigns. Anastas is also an alumnus of the Wharton School of the University of Pennsylvania, having graduated from the Advanced Management Program.

== Career ==
=== Music ===
Anastas co-founded the Boston hardcore bands, DYS and Slapshot. He recorded the DYS album Brotherhood when he was a sophomore in high school. Anastas played bass and wrote songs for both DYS and Slapshot. In a review of Slapshot's debut album, Back on the Map, Maximum Rocknroll described Anastas as "assaulting his bass with sheer brutality combined with a ton of muscle overdrive."

Both DYS and Slapshot were straight edge: they abstained from alcohol, drugs, and smoking. DYS was known for their early role in the crossover movement, where hardcore punk bands attempted a more commercial hard rock sound and looked toward recording deals within the mainstream major label system, inventing the idea of a "hardcore power ballad" to describe a track on their second metal-influenced album. The band broke up in the 1980s. In 2009 they reformed, performing at the Gallery East Reunion Festival. Their performance was filmed for the documentary xxx All Ages xxx.

Anastas wrote the song "Slam" for a one-off project called Decadence, which appeared on Modern Method Records’ This Is Boston, Not L.A. collection in 1982. The track was used to score MTV's Santa Claus, the Man, the Myth, the Slam Dancer holiday promo, which ran for over 15 years.

His contributions to punk were documented in several books, including All Ages: Reflections on Straight Edge, and American Hardcore: A Tribal History by Steven Blush. He was featured in the film adaptation of the book, which was released by Sony Pictures in 2006. He also appeared in Chip on My Shoulder: The History of Slapshot, directed by music video director Ian McFarland.

=== Advertising career ===
Anastas was director of interactive marketing at Saatchi & Saatchi in Los Angeles; he worked with Toyota when the company first started using the internet. He later worked as VP/head of marketing at Atari and as a senior marketing executive at Activision. He was the chief marketing officer at LiveXLive Media and global CMO at Singapore-based ONE eSports before becoming the CEO of ClashTV in March 2023. Anastas's work has been covered in Ad Age and his campaigns have won EFFIES.

== Discography ==
- 1982 – Decadence, "Slam" on the This Is Boston, Not L.A. compilation LP (bass)
- 1983 – DYS, Brotherhood (bass, back-up vocals)
- 1985 – DYS, DYS (bass)
- 1986 – Slapshot, Back on the Map (bass, back-up vocals)
- 1993 – DYS Fire and Ice – CD reissue of previous two albums (bass, back-up vocals)
- 1993 – DYS, "Wolfpack" on the Faster and Louder, Volume Two compilation
- 2005 – DYS "Wolfpack" – "Brotherhood," re-released with the band's original Wolfpack radio demo
- 2011 – DYS "More than Fashion: LIVE from the Gallery East Reunion" – live tracks from the band's initial reunion show, Bridge 9 Records
- 2011 – DYS "Wild Card" – Single on Bridge 9 Records
- 2011 – DYS "Sound of our Town" – Single on Bridge 9 Records
- 2012 – DYS "Unloaded" – Single on Bridge 9 Records
- 2012 – DYS "(We are) The Road Crew" (Motorhead Cover) – Single on Bridge 9 Records
- 2012 – DYS "Brotherhood 2012" – Single on Bridge 9 Records
- 2012 – DYS "True Believers" – Single on Bridge 9 Records
- 2024 – DYS "Brotherhood Anniversary Edition" - on Bridge 9 Records, issued in clear, ruby red and green editions
- 2024 - DYSBANDED "Black Daze" - Single on a)))live Records
- 2024 - DYSBANDED "Another Broken Night" - Single on a)))live Records
- 2025 - DYSBANDED "Rebel Son" - Single on a)))live Records
- 2025 - DYSBANDED "Bitter" - Single on a)))live Records
- 2025 - DYSBANDED "The Wilcox Demos" - EP on a)))live Records
- 2025 - DYSB "Wolfpack '25" - Single on Bridge 9 Records
