= All Ages: The Boston Hardcore Film =

- Film poster
- Directed by: Drew Stone
- Produced by: Duane Lucia; Katie Goldman
- Distributed by: Gallery East
- Release date: April 27, 2012
- Running time: 85 minutes
- Language: English

All Ages: The Boston Hardcore Film, a Gallery East Production in association with Stone Films/NYC, is a documentary directed by Drew Stone, which had its world premier at the Independent Film Festival of Boston on April 27, 2012. The film features interviews, archival footage and the music of Boston’s early hardcore bands including Deep Wound, DYS, Gang Green, Impact Unit, Jerry's Kids, Negative FX, SS Decontrol, The Freeze and The F.U.'s. Also featured in the film are interviews with renowned author Michael Patrick MacDonald ("Easter Rising", "All Souls"), Actress Christine Elise McCarthy, Advertising Executive Jonathan Anastas, Thrasher Magazine Editor Jake Phelps, "American Hardcore" Director Paul Rachman, "Blowing Smoke with Twisted Rico Podcast" host Steev Riccardo, and Newbury Comics owner Michael Dreese. All Ages has been released on DVD with numerous extras and director's commentary.

== Plot ==
The film explores the early Boston Hardcore music scene from the years 1981 through 1984 and delves deep into the social and communal aspects of that era; the community, culture, straight-edge and DIY (‘do it yourself’) ethic of the time. There are over fifty interviews, never before seen live footage, rare photographs, and dramatizations.

Composed of a soundtrack of first generation hardcore including SS Decontrol, Gang Green, Jerry's Kids, The F.U.'s, among others, All Ages examines this period of American youth culture and its history.

== Production ==
The film was shot and edited over a three-year period, with many of the posters and photos resulting from a Facebook campaign to gather archival imagery coupled with scanning parties at the West End Museum. The majority of the personal interviews were shot at Suffolk University. Included in the film are over 120 images of Boston punk rock photographer Phil In Phlash whose photography appeared on the cover of Boston's first two hardcore LPs This Is Boston, Not L.A. and The Kids Will Have Their Say.

== Soundtrack ==
1. How Much Art - SS Decontrol 2. More Than Fashion - DYS 3. I Don’t Belong - Jerry's Kids 4. Time Bomb - The Freeze 5. We Don’t Need It - Jerry's Kids 6. Not Normal - SS Decontrol 7. Complain - Impact Unit 8. Is This My World? - Jerry's Kids 9. F.U. - F.U.'s 10. My Friend The Pit - Impact Unit 11. More Than Fashion - DYS 12. This Is Boston Not LA - The Freeze 13. Stand Proud - DYS 14. Have Fun - Gang Green 15. Slam - Decadence 16. Now Or Never - The Freeze 17. Sick of Fun - Deep Wound 18. Snob - Gang Green 19. Straight Jacket - Jerry's Kids 20. Night Stalker - Impact Unit 21. Hazardous Waste - Negative FX 22. Young Fast Iranians - F.U.'s 23. Trouble If You Hide - The Freeze 24. Brotherhood - DYS 25. My Machine Gun - Jerry's Kids
