= Miles Away (band) =

Australian hardcore punk band

- Origin: Perth, Western Australia
- Genres: Hardcore punk, Melodic hardcore
- Years active: 2002–present
- Labels: Resist Records, Bridge Nine Records, Common Bond Records, 6131 Records, Anchors Aweigh Records
- Members: Nick Horsnell- Vocals; Adam Crowe - Guitar; Cam Jose - Guitar; Jared Crowe - Bass; Jackson McCutcheon - Drums
- Past members: Chris Unsworth - Drums; Josh Stucken - Drums; Steven Hopperton - Bass; Ash Pederick - Bass; Colton Vaughan Jolliffe - Bass
- Website: www.myspace.com/milesawayhc

Miles Away is an Australian hardcore punk band from Perth, Western Australia, formed in 2002.

== History ==
Miles Away was formed in mid-2002 by Cam Jose and Adam Crowe, who then drafted in Chris Unsworth, the drummer from Crowe's first band Alleged, to play the bass. Nick Horsnell joined up on vocals in late 2002. At this time the band was going under the name Burning Bridges, until they found a US band with the same name.

The band's second album, Consequences was released in January 2006.

Miles Away recorded their 2010 album Endless Roads with producer Dean Baltulonis (Sick of It All, American Nightmare, No Warning, Modern Life is War) at The Wild Arctic Recording Studio in New York City. The album was released in August through Resist Records (Australia) and Anchors Aweigh Records (Europe). Ash Pederick decided to leave the band and focus on his own project. Colton Vaughan Jolliffe (formally of Perth hardcore act Something More) filled in on bass while the band was on tour.

In 2010, Miles Away released the full-length album Endless Roads, and followed that with Tide in 2015.

== Discography ==
=== Full Length Recordings ===
List of albums, with selected chart positions
Title	Album details	Peak chart positions
Title	Album details	AUS
Miles Away	Released: 12 July 2005; Label: Common Bond (AU) / Bridge Nine (US.EU); Format: CD; Note: Make It Count EP re-released with the 4 songs from the "State of Affairs" split and the "Armed with Hope" demo tracks	—
Consequences	Released: 24 January 2006; Label: Common Bond (AU) / Bridge Nine (US/EU), Alliance Trax (JP); Format: CD, LP	—
Rewind, Repeat...	Released: 13 June 2007; Label: Resist Records (AU) / 6131; Format: CD, LP	—
Endless Roads	Released: 20 August 2010; Label: Resist Records (AU) / Anchors Aweigh (EU) / Six Feet Under (US) / Brainwreck (Asia); Format: CD, LP, Cassette	93
Tide	Released: 5 May 2015; Label: Resist Records / Anchors Aweigh Records (EU) / Six Feet Under (US); Format: CD, LP	—

=== Demos, EPs & 7" ===
- Miles Away 2SD (2003, Self-released, Tape)
- Armed with Hope (2003, Self-released, CD-R)
- Make It Count (2004, Common Bond Records, CD, 10")
- Brainwashed (2006, Resist Records, 7")
- Memory Embraced (30 July 2010, Self-released, 7")
- Weathered (15 January 2015, Self-released, 7")

=== Splits & Compilations ===
- State of Affairs Split (split album with The Amity Affliction, Perish the Thought, Hi End Audio, Away from Now) (2004)
