= The F.U.'s =

American hardcore punk band

The FUs
- Origin: Boston, Massachusetts, United States
- Genres: Hardcore punk
- Years active: 1982–1985; 2010–present
- Labels: Xclaim, Restless, Taang!, Reflex/Wolfpack Records
- Past members: John Sox; Steve Grimes; Bob Furapples; Wayne Maestri; Steve Martin; Bones; Mick Stunt; Rockin' Bob Cenci

The FUs are a hardcore punk band from Boston, Massachusetts. They formed in 1981 as a three-piece band, released three records and appeared on the compilation This Is Boston, Not LA before changing their name to Straw Dogs in 1986 to market themselves as a heavy metal act. In 2010 The FUs reformed under their original moniker.

== History ==
=== Formation and early records ===
The FUs formed as a hardcore punk band in Boston late in 1981. The band initially consisted of John Sox on bass and lead vocals, Bob Furapples on drums, and Steve Grimes on guitar. This line-up recorded a four-song demo which received airplay on the numerous college radio stations in the Boston area.

The FUs started out playing fast, thrashy hardcore punk. In 1982 Wayne Maestri was recruited to take over bass guitar, and this four-piece line-up recorded tracks for the Modern Method compilation, This Is Boston, Not LA, which also featured tracks by Gang Green, Jerry's Kids and The Freeze. A companion 7-inch EP, Unsafe at Any Speed, included another FUs' track.

Later the same year, FUs‘ debut album, Kill For Christ, was released on Xclaim Records, featuring cover artwork by Septic Death frontman Brian 'Pushead' Schroeder, depicting Jesus with a machine gun. Their second album for Xclaim, My America, came out in 1983, and the band's final album as The FUs, Do We Really Want To Hurt You? followed in 1984, on Gasatanka/Enigma.

=== Political controversy ===
During the heyday of political hardcore punk of the early 1980s, The FUs ran afoul of Tim Yohannan, founder and editor of Maximum Rocknroll. Yohannan and others found the patriotic lyrics and artwork on My America to be emblems of right wing nationalism. Drummer and songwriter Bob Furapples noted that MRR's negative publicity had adversely impacted the band's record sales, particularly in Europe. Satirical punk band The Dead Milkmen poked fun at the band's supposed right-wing views on their song "Tiny Town" on the album Big Lizard in My Backyard.

FUs lyricist Jon Sox has said in writing "My America," He "wanted to get a reaction." Sox writes: "On our first tour I encountered lots of young kids who had their entire lives in front of them. A lot of them had turned to hard drugs. I was looking for a shocking way to say, 'Yeah, America has its problems but destroying yourself isn't helping.' It had to be high impact because I saw a crisis looming."

=== Straw Dogs ===
After the release of the third FUs album, the band had begun to take a more aggressive rock direction, favoring "punk" without the label of "hardcore." The changes were taken further when the band changed its name to Straw Dogs, with guitarist Steve Martin and drummer Chris "Bones" Jones added to the line-up. As Straw Dogs, the band released an EP followed by two albums. Drummer Jones died in a car crash the day after the debut Straw Dogs LP was released. The EP and first LP, Straw Dogs and We Are Not Amused, respectively, were released on the Restless/Enigma label. The third album Your Own Worst Nightmare was released by Lone Wolf Records, an independent label from Toronto. European re-releases came from German label, Lost and Found Records, some of which were authorised by the band.

=== Reissues and reunions ===
The FUs material was re-released on Classy Records and then on Taang! Records. In 2002 Reflex/Wolfpack Records re-released both Kill For Christ and My America on one LP.

John Sox reintroduced the music of FUs and Straw Dogs by forming the band Payload! in 2006 with Richie Rich, Bobby Frankenheim (who later joined the reunited DYS), Jack Snyder currently of Wrought Iron Hex, and Mick Stunt, currently of the West Coast band, The Stuntmen. When approached by Katie Goldman of Gallery East to participate in an upcoming documentary called xxx ALL AGES xxx Sox decided to reunite all of the original members with members of Payload! to form the first hardcore supergroup for lack of a better term. Sharing the stage for a live show (as mentioned in the press release) at Club Lido in Revere were, Sox, Grimes, Furapples, Maestri, Rich, and Stunt.

The FUs performed a reunion show in the Boston area on August 29, 2010, along with fellow Boston pioneer hardcore punk bands DYS, Jerry's Kids, and Gang Green as well as New York City's Antidote. The show was in support of xxx ALL AGES xxx, a documentary about the original hardcore punk scene in Boston in the early 1980s, being produced in association with Stone Films NYC.

The reunited band has followed the Club Lido show with gigs in New England, and returned to the studio to record a song for a compilation called Cashing in on Christmas Vol. III for Black Hole Records.

The reborn FUs continue to play extensively in New England and have completed tours to Europe including the festivals Rebellion and Bloodstains in the UK and Ieper Hardcore Fest in Belgium, and in the US to the mid-atlantic states and the West Coast including an appearance in the Punk Rock Bowling Festival, held annually in Las Vegas.

The current line-up is John Sox, vocals, Steve Grimes, lead guitar, backup vocals, Ian King, second guitar, backup vocals, Jimmy Foul, bass, backup vocals, and Bob Furapples, drums.

Wayne Maestri died in January 2026.

== Discography ==
=== The FUs ===
- Kill For Christ (1982), Xclaim
- My America (1983), Xclaim
- Do We Really Want to Hurt You? (1984), Gastanka/Enigma
- Death Squad Nostalgia(2022), Yankee Vandal

=== Straw Dogs ===
- Straw Dogs EP (1986), Restless
- We Are Not Amused (1986), Restless 1986
- Your Own Worst Nightmare (1990), Lone Wolf
