= Kicked in the Head =

American ska punk band

Kicked in the Head were a ska punk band founded in Boston, Massachusetts in the mid-1990s. Known for Halloween shows with Big D and The Kids Table, the band signed with the label run by Big D, Fork in Hand Records, and released their debut album World Domination in 1997. They went on to appear on the Warped Tour in 1998 and opened for The Mighty Mighty Bosstones.

In 1999 the band was selected to play in the WBCN Rock & Roll Rumble. They again toured on the Warped Tour in 2003, and appeared on the Warped Tour 2003 Tour Compilation album. Kicked in the Head disbanded in 2005.

== Discography ==
=== Studio albums ===
- World Domination (1997)
- Thick as Thieves (2000)

=== EPs ===
- All in the Family (1998) (split with The Goonies)
- Salita (2002)

=== Compilation appearances ===
- Boston Drops the Gloves: A Tribute to Slapshot (1999)
- Warped Tour 2003 Tour Compilation (2003)
- In Honor: A Compilation to Beat Cancer (2004)

== Members ==
- Gary Hedrick - lead vocals
- Ryan Dowd - bass guitar
- Matt Sanocki - guitar
- Anthony Modano - drums
- Ryan Overbeck - vocals, keyboards
- Benjamin B. Bado-Pacciarelli (a.k.a. "Snaggletooth") - alto saxophone, vocals, merchandiser, band treasurer
- Edwin Selvaraj - trumpet, vocals
- Julian "Caz" Cassinetti - trombone, vocals
- Matt Rositano - trombone, guitar, vocals
- Jonathan Togo - alto saxophone
- Daniel “Spam” Calden - alto/baritone saxophones, vocals
