= Negative FX (album) =

Studio album by Negative FX
- Released: 1984
- Recorded: April and November 1982 at Radiobeat Studios in Kenmore Square
- Genre: Thrashcore, Hardcore Punk
- Length: 16:06
- Label: Taang!

Negative FX chronology
Negative FX (1984)	Government War Plans (2003)

Negative FX is the only full-length album released by Boston hardcore punk band Negative FX. It was released in 1984 on Taang! Records.

In 2002, Belgian label Reflex/Wolfpack Records reissued the album under the name Discography & Live with the addition of a live version of "Might Makes Right".

Professional ratings
Review scores
Source	Rating
AllMusic	4/5 stars
PunkNews	4.5/5 stars

== Track list ==
1. "Feel Like a Man" – 1:59
2. "Together" – 0:33
3. "Protester" – 0:23
4. "Mind Control" – 1:28
5. "I Know Better" – 0:32
6. "Citizens Arrest" – 0:50
7. "Negative FX" – 0:24
8. "The Few, The Proud" – 0:36
9. "Punch in the Face" – 0:08
10. "Primary Attack" – 0:30
11. "Hazardous Waste" – 1:05
12. "Turn Your Back" – 1:36
13. "Nightstick Justice" – 0:22
14. "I.D.N.T.F.S." – 0:36 (a.k.a. "I Don't Need This Fucking Shit")
15. "Modern Problems" – 0:59
16. "Nuclear Fear" – 0:40
17. "VFW" – 2:36
18. "Repeat" – 0:49
