= Unconsciousness (album) =

Studio album by Slapshot
- Released: 1994
- Genre: Hardcore punk
- Length: 37:46
- Label: We Bite
- Producer: Steve Albini

Slapshot chronology
| Blast Furnace (1993) | Unconsciousness (1994) | 16 Valve Hate (1995) |

Unconsciousness is the third studio album by the American hardcore band Slapshot. It was released in 1994 via We Bite Records. It the first album to feature Mike Bowser on guitar.

== Background ==
The album was recorded during a difficult period for the band from 1993 and 1994. They were working on material for their next record, writing and discarding a large amount of music, about 30 songs in all were composed. During this time Chris Lauria was pushing to bring former drummer Mark McKay back into the lineup to add some energy, but Jack Kelly refused the idea. They also had a line up change during the process as following a 1993 tour their guitarist Darryl Sheppard left to pursue other musical interests, his friend Mike Bowser, then joined the group in the summer of 1993.

Tensions were high within the group. Lauria and Barry Hite were clashing, and Hite was also having problems with Kelly. In the midst of this internal strain, tragedy struck on June 7, 1994, when former Slapshot member Jordan Wood died by suicide. McKay, Kelly, and Lauria reunited briefly at the funeral, though guitarist Steve Risteen was overseas and unable to attend. Lauria used the moment to once again advocate for McKay's return, but Kelly remained firmly opposed.

Soon after, the band traveled to Chicago to record the album. With this record the group believed they were creating something fresh and different compared to their earlier work. The result was Unconsciousness, which was produced by former member of Big Black and Nirvana producer Steve Albini.

The band's lead singer Jack Kelly later reflected on the sound change in a 2014 interview stating:

Well you know after doing hardcore for a few years, everyone was starting to change and do something a little different. You think you're doing what's right, you think you're doing what you're into at the moment. Everyone was listening to Soundgarden and Nirvana and the whole grunge thing was getting pretty big. I was really into industrial bands like Ministry. You know what you like to do is probably not what the band should be doing at that period of time and you sort of get out of your comfort zone and do some things that you're into at the time, but maybe some other people are not that into.

Altogether the recording and mixing process took four days.

== Critical reception ==
Professional ratings
Review scores
| Source | Rating |
|---|---|
| Ox-Fanzine | 4.0/5 stars |
| Visions.de | Positive |

Ox-Fanzine wrote that the album continued Slapshots “musical trajectory unwaveringly.” Adding “Great songs, fantastic atmosphere, always lyrically edgy and teetering on the edge, plus a cover of NEGAZIONE's "Back to my friends".

Germany music reviewer Visons.de stated “Unconsciousness” is their most complex and inaccessible album, featuring catchy, memorable tunes.”

== Track listing ==
All tracks are written by Slapshot.

| No. | Title | Length |
|---|---|---|
| 1. | "Day My Thoughts Turned to Murder" | 1:55 |
| 2. | "Unconsciousness" | 4:24 |
| 3. | "Broken" | 2:55 |
| 4. | "Gasoline" | 3:46 |
| 5. | "Bulletproof" | 3:24 |
| 6. | "My Mothers Son" | 3:05 |
| 7. | "Victimized" | 3:10 |
| 8. | "Pushing In on Me" | 3:31 |
| 9. | "Back to My Friends" (Negazione cover) | 3:03 |
| 10. | "Insomnia" | 4:44 |
| 11. | "Blameless" | 3:35 |
| 12. | "You Have the Right to Remain Violent" | 1:42 |

== Personnel ==
Slapshot

- Bass – Chris Lauria
- Drums – Barry Hite
- Guitar – Mike Bowser
- Vocals – Jack Kelly

Additional work

- Cover art – Marcus Pacheco
- Direct Metal Mastering by – G.P*
- Mastered by – John Golden
- Produced by – Steve Albini
