= DYS (band) =

American hardcore punk band

- DYS performing in 2026

Background information
- Origin: Boston, Massachusetts, U.S.
- Genres: Hardcore punk, heavy metal
- Years active: 1983-1985, 2010-present
- Label: Bridge 9
- Members: Dave Smalley; Jonathan Anastas; Johnny Heatley; Demien Arragia; Adam Porris
- Past members: Andy Strachan; Ross Luongo; Dave Collins; Chris Foley; Bobby Frankenheim; Jack Clark; Al Pahanish Jr; Franz Stahl
- Website: facebook.com/dysboston

DYS is an American straight edge hardcore punk band from Boston, Massachusetts, who were part of the "Boston Crew" in the 1980s, along with contemporaries such as SSD and Negative FX. The group later expanded their sound, becoming one of the first hardcore bands to veer into heavy metal.

== History ==
=== Formation/First Incarnation ===
DYS was founded in the 1980s by singer Dave Smalley and bassist Jonathan Anastas. At the time, Smalley was a freshman at Boston College, while Anastas - at age 15 - had previously founded the short-lived band Decadence, whose song "Slam" was featured on the This Is Boston, Not LA compilation, and later adopted for a long-running MTV advertising campaign titled "Santa, the Man, the Myth, the Slam Dancer."

DYS took its name from the Department of Youth Services, a Massachusetts governmental organization where delinquent youth were housed, as well as the Alice Cooper teen power anthem "Department of Youth." Smalley and Anastas were joined by guitarist Andy Strachan and drummer Dave Collins. The band released their debut album Brotherhood, produced by punk recording legend Lou Giordano. They added lead guitar player Ross Luongo and released their second self-titled album, DYS, which took them in a metal direction and included the first power ballad ever attempted by a hardcore band. During their metal period, live sound was handled by noted hard rock producer Andrew Murdock, who works under the professional name "Mudrock” and ex-SS Decontrol drummer Chris Foley performed with the band, including their final show, a showcase for Elektra Records A&R executive Michael Alago, who was feted in a 2017 bio pic.

=== Initial breakup ===
After DYS broke up, Anastas became a founding member of Slapshot. Dave Smalley went on to sing for Dag Nasty, ALL and Down By Law, before founding Don't Sleep. Strachan co-founded the more rock-focused band Slaughter Shack, winning the Rumble music contest. Ross Luongo went on to play guitar for the reformed Jerry's Kids. Both of DYS's 1980s albums were re-issued together on CD and in digital formats by Taang! Records (titled Fire and Ice). Brotherhood has periodically reissued on CD, vinyl and digital formats with and without the addition of the Wolfpack demo tape, featuring Hüsker Dü singing back-up vocals. An anniversary re-release with Bridge9 Records was issued in January 2024.

=== Reformation/Second Incarnation ===
On August 29, 2009, DYS headlined the Gallery East reunion show in front of over 1,000 fans, along with fellow Boston hardcore punk pioneers Jerry's Kids, Gang Green and The F.U.'s, Slapshot as well as New York City's Antidote. The reunion line-up included an additional guitar player, Bobby Frankenheim (Ex-Deathwish), and drummer Jack Clark of Jerry's Kids and Unnatural Axe. The show was recorded for the movie xxx ALL AGES xxx, a documentary about the hardcore punk scene in Boston in the 1980s. A live album of the performance was released on August 9, 2010, on Bridge 9 Records as "More than Fashion: LIVE from the Gallery East Reunion" on vinyl and digital formats.

After that show, and facing interest from promoters to continue the reunion shows, Smalley and Anastas recruited a new west coast-based "all star" line-up featuring ex-Foo Fighters and current Scream guitarist Franz Stahl, ex-Powerman 5000 drummer Al Pahanish Jr., and guitarist Adam Porris, who played in Far From Finished. They played the 2010 "Hometown Throwdown" at the House of Blues in Boston, in support of the Mighty Mighty Bosstones, and again at the same venue in support of the Dropkick Murphys' annual St. Patrick's Day stand in 2012. The band also completed 2011 and 2012 recording sessions with their old soundman, Andrew "Mudrock" Murdock, in Los Angeles. Recordings from these sessions were released as digital singles from Fall 2011 through to Fall 2012 on Bridge 9, the first being "Wild Card," released November 8, 2011, followed by "Sound of our Town" featuring Dicky Barrett of the Mighty Mighty Bosstones on guest vocals, released December 13, 2011, "Unloaded", released January 24, 2012, a cover of Motörhead's "(We Are The) Road Crew" in February 2012, a re-make of "Brotherhood" (Brotherhood 2012) in July 2012 and "True Believers" in October 2012.

This line-up of DYS played more than 100 live shows in the US and Europe between 2011 and 2017. Major festival dates included the 2011 Rumble Fest in Chicago, the 2011 Sound and Fury Fest in Santa Barbara, the 2012 Black n' Blue Bowl, the 2012 SXSW Festival, the 2012 Groezrock Festival, the 2012 My Fest in Berlin, the 2012 Tsunami East Fest, the 2014 Southeast Beast Fest, the 2014 EIPER Fest and the 2017 Resurrection fest in Spain. DYS announced summer 2020 and 2021 runs of European festivals and club shows that were cancelled due to the COVID-19 pandemic.

The 2024 Bridge9 Records anniversary re-release of "Brotherhood" sold out the first pressing in pre-orders and peaked at #9 on the Cortex Records sale charts, appearing on the legendary German punk rock record store's influential charts for three weeks.

DYS ended their live hiatus (extended by Dave Smalley's battle with cancer) in 2026, opening up for Slapshot during their farewell show on October 17, 2026 in front of 2,000 fans in Boston. With new drummer Demien Arragia and new gitiar player Johnny "Rock" Heatley.

== Discography ==
- 1983 – DYS "Brotherhood" on XClaim! Records
- 1985 – DYS "DYS" on Modern Method Records
- 1993 – Various Artists "Faster and Louder, Volume Two" (Contributed the track "Wolfpack" which was the band's unreleased first demo tape and a live favorite)
- 1993 – DYS "Fire and Ice" (first two albums combined on CD) on Taang! Records
- 2005 – DYS "Wolfpack" – "Brotherhood" re-released with the addition of the band's original Wolfpack radio demo featuring Hüsker Dü on back-up vocals, on Taang! Records
- 2010 – DYS "More than Fashion: LIVE from the Gallery East Reunion" – live tracks from the "Gallery East Reunion" festival and "xxx All Ages xxx" movie, on Bridge 9 Records
- 2011 - DYS "Wild Card" - Single on Bridge 9 Records
- 2011 - DYS "Sound of our Town" - Single on Bridge 9 Records, featuring Dicky Barrett of the Mighty Mighty Bosstones
- 2012 - DYS "Unloaded" - Single on Bridge 9 Records
- 2012 - DYS "(We are) The Road Crew" - Single on Bridge 9 Records, Motorhead cover
- 2012 - DYS "Brotherhood 2012" - Single on Bridge 9 Records
- 2012 - DYS "True Believer" - Single on Bridge 9 Records
- 2012 – DYS "Brotherhood" Vinyl-only re-release on Taang! Records, limited edition, red and 180 gram versions
- 2023 – DYS "Brotherhood" Vinyl-only "40th Anniversary" version released on Bridge 9 Records, limited edition, three colors, screen printed, one-sided
- 2023 – DYS "Wolfpack 2025" - Single on A)))Live records

== Bibliography ==
- Blush, Steve (2001). American Hardcore: A Tribal History. Feral House. ISBN 1-932595-89-9.
