= Boston Drops the Gloves: A Tribute to Slapshot =

Compilation album by Various artists
- Released: December 14, 1999
- Genre: Hardcore punk
- Length: 48:05
- Label: TKO

Boston Drops the Gloves: A Tribute to Slapshot is a tribute album to Boston hardcore punk band Slapshot. It was released in 1999 on TKO Records and features Slapshot covers by 22 Boston area punk bands.

== Track listing ==
No.	Title	Artist	Length
1.	"No Friend of Mine"	Blood for Blood	3:21
2.	"Chameleon"	Tommy & The Terrors	2:02
3.	"Straight Edge in Your Face"	Ten Yard Fight	2:23
4.	"Might Make Right"	Close Call	2:25
5.	"Do What You Want"	30 Seconds Over Tokyo	1:18
6.	"Old Tyme Hardcore"	Anal Cunt	1:12
7.	"Rise and Fall"	Pug Uglies	2:07
8.	"Enforcer"	Strikers	2:36
9.	"What's at Stake"	The Mighty Mighty Bosstones	2:49
10.	"Where There's Smoke"	Vigilantes	1:33
11.	"Step on It"	Intent to Injure	1:52
12.	"I Want You Dead"	Kicked in the Head	2:14
13.	"Back on the Map"	The Trouble	2:56
14.	"Something to Prove"	Wrong Side of the Tracks	2:47
15.	"It's Happening Today"	Pinkerton Thugs	2:24
16.	"Johnny Was"	Blacklist	2:40
17.	"No Guts, No Glory"	Last in Line	1:33
18.	"Hang Up Your Boots"	The Grenades	2:51
19.	"No Time Left"	Nobody's Heroes	1:59
20.	"Secrets"	Down But Not Out	2:09
21.	"Moment of Truth"	Molly Maguires	1:41
22.	"I've Had Enough"	Dropkick Murphys	1:56
