= Digital Warfare (album) =

Studio album by Slapshot
- Released: July 18, 2003
- Genre: Hardcore punk
- Length: 36:05
- Label: I Scream Records

Slapshot chronology
| Olde Tyme Hardcore (1996) | Digital Warfare (2003) | Tear it Down (2005) |

Digital Warfare is the sixth studio album by the American hardcore band Slapshot that was released on July 18, 2003 via I Scream records. It was the band's album in over a decade to not feature longtime guitarist Mike Bowser, who had been with the band since 1994, and the last album to feature founding drummer Mark McKay.

In 2018, a limited edition reissue was released in both the U.S. and Belgium.

== Background ==
Following the band's crossover tour in 1996, lead singer Jack "Choke" Kelly didn't feel like continuing the band and no new album was expected; however, following a few tours between 2001 and 2003, bassist bass player Chris Laurie called Kelly. "Chris called me one day and suggested that we record something new again. And that sounded damn good, so I got to work and wrote new songs. Then we recorded and mixed the album over a few weekends – and it was fun to be back in the studio. That's how the new album was created." Following the departure of long time guitarist Mike Bowser, Ed Lalli took over and the album was recorded in Baked Bean Studios in Harrison, Maine.

The album title was picked in criticism towards the Iraq war and how sterile today's wars have become. Kelly stated “Someone sits in a command center and presses a few buttons, and a few hundred people die. But the perpetrators don't see anything of it, it's all become a crazy video game. Just think of CNN and the way war is presented there: 'Dear ladies and gentlemen, here you can see how a cruise missile is shot down. We are now switching live to the onboard camera to better track the flight.'. That's so sick, especially when it comes to this talk about clean warfare. There is no such thing, we are just less aware of what war actually is, and let the whole thing be presented as entertainment. Only when you see all the blood again will some people understand what war is all about." He added “Every war is wrong, no reasonable person can seriously justify a war. And in the matter with Iraq, it is so that everyone has been lied to with the fairy tale of the Iraqi threat."

The album also featured some less serious lyrics, such as a cover of "C Is for Cookie" from Sesame Street. The song "The Last Laugh" is about former Madball bassist Jorge "Hoya Roc" Guerra.

== Reception ==
Professional ratings
Review scores
| Source | Rating |
|---|---|
| AllMusic | 3/5 stars |
| Punk News | 3.5/5 stars |
| Rough Edge | 4/5 stars |
| Read Junk | 3.5/5 stars |
| Visions.de | 8/12 stars |
| Ox-Fanzine | Favorable |
| Metal.de | 7/10 |

With this album, Slapshot went back to their roots with a more aggressive sound. Punknews stated "The thing that really strikes me about this release is how revitalized this band sounds. Their past few releases weren't really as aggressive as their earlier material, but they sound like a new band on here. Not that they've changed their sound, or that they don't sound seasoned, but they just come out of the gate with the intensity of some kids who are recording their first album." Scott Bolton, writing for Rough Edge, gave the album a positive review, stating “Amazingly, this is the band's first studio album in seven years. You'd never know it. 'Digital Warfare' is a furious, raging ass-kicking disc with nary a low point. Any fan of hardcore or heavy punk will find something to like here."

Rick Anderson of AllMusic wrote "Slapshot are true eminence grise. And no one can accuse them of selling out, either; Choke may be starting to get a bit thick around the middle, but he can still yell like it's 1984, and the band's outraged roar has only condensed and tightened with time. They've also got a sense of humor, a rare and precious commodity in the world of hardcore: while they're probably (and unfortunately) serious about the 'Spirit of '81,' and about how they've 'got the straight-edge,' on 'Had It With Unity,' they also have the guts to proclaim their impatience with the empty and insular rhetoric of so much hardcore punk ('United we win/Divided we fall/How much have we heard that call?/All these years we've never learned a thing'), and they have the good taste to cover Cookie Monster on the album's hidden track at the end. And hey, is that a melody on 'Wasted Time'? No, I must be hearing things. Good stuff."

German reviewer Visions.de wrote "Hardly any other band embodies such unwavering self-consistency as the Boston hardcore outfit fronted by vocalist Jack “Choke” Kelly. 'Digital Warfare,' and 'Stupid Fucking Kids' blast through your system just as uncompromisingly as 'Sixteen Valve Hate' did in 1995, and the sound is more reminiscent of their 1994 banger 'Unconsciousness.'

== Track listing ==
| No. | Title | Writer(s) | Length |
|---|---|---|---|
| 1. | "Digital Warfare" | Jack Kelly | 1:56 |
| 2. | "The Last Laugh" | Kelly | 3:00 |
| 3. | "Identity" | Kelly | 2:06 |
| 4. | "Kill Your Parents" | Kelly | 1:47 |
| 5. | "Spirit of '81" | Kelly | 3:09 |
| 6. | "Straight Edge" | Ian MacKaye; Minor Threat | 1:24 |
| 7. | "Had It with Unity" | Kelly | 3:17 |
| 8. | "Tear Down the Walls" | Kelly; Chris Lauria | 2:24 |
| 9. | "Stupid Fucking Kids" | Kelly | 1:45 |
| 10. | "Focus" | Kelly; Ed Lalli | 2:03 |
| 11. | "Wasted Time" | Kelly | 3:30 |
| 12. | "Witch Hunt" | Kelly | 1:59 |
| 13. | "C Is for Cookie" | | 1:59 |
| Total length: | | | 29:39 |

== Personnel ==
Slapshot

- Jack "Choke" Kelly – lead vocals
- Ed Lalli – guitar
- Chris Lauria – bass
- Mark Mckay – drums

Technical personnel

- Alan Ward – mastering
- John Bean – engineer
- Grail Mortillaro – photography
- Matt Pike – concept
