= Expire =

American hardcore punk band

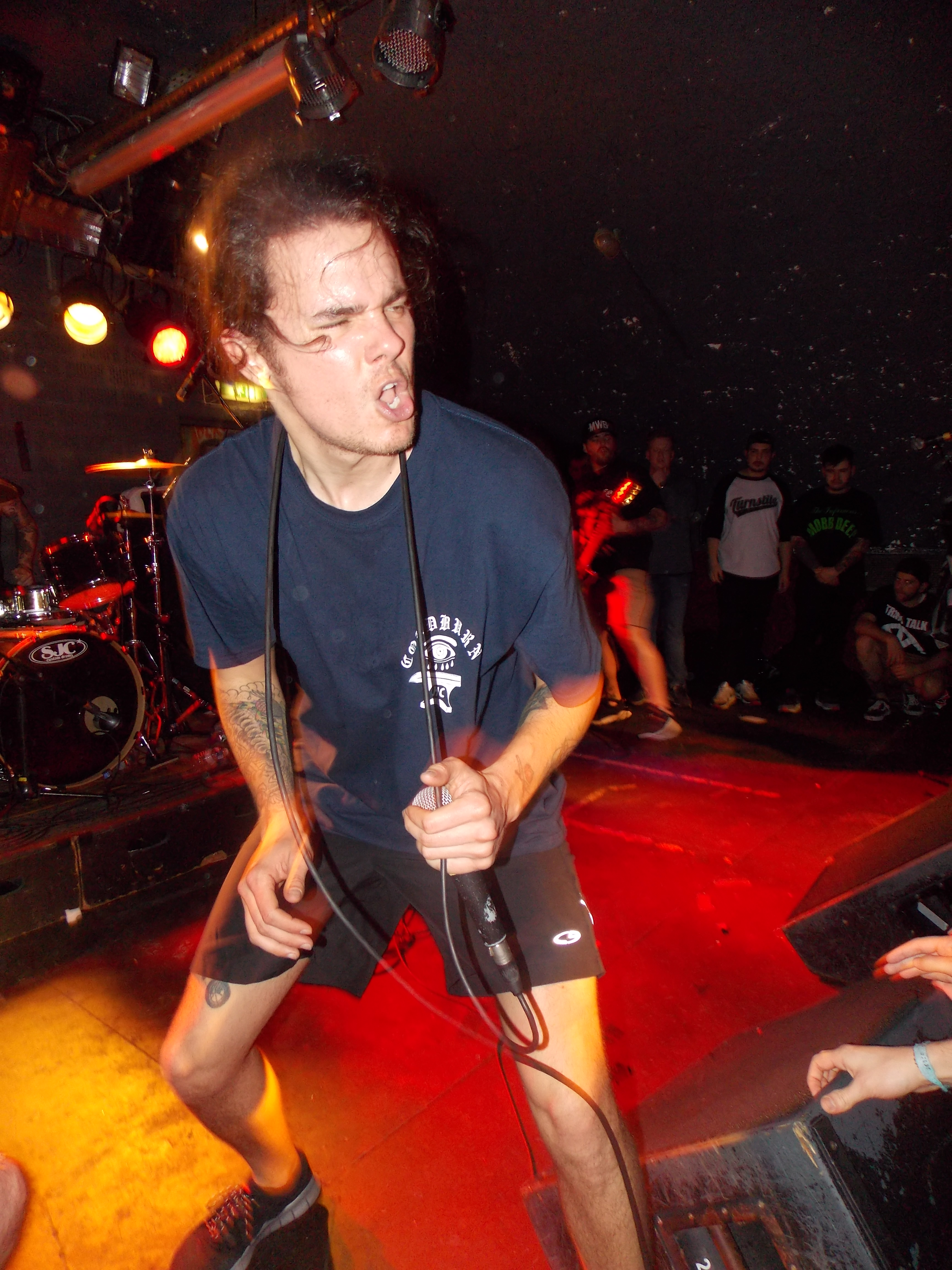
- Vocalist Joshua Kelting in Trier

Background information
- Origin: Milwaukee, Wisconsin, U.S.
- Genres: Hardcore punk
- Years active: 2009–2017
- Labels: Bridge 9
- Members: Josh Kelting; Zach Dear; Marcus Boldt; Caleb Murphy
- Website: expirehc.com

Expire was an American hardcore punk band from Milwaukee, Wisconsin, United States, active from 2009 to 2017. They were signed to Bridge 9 Records.

== History ==
Expire was formed in 2009. They released three full-length albums, three EPs and one split. They released their first full length, titled Pendulum Swings in 2012. They released their second full length, titled Pretty Low in 2014. Pretty Low peaked at No. 175 on the Billboard 200 chart. In August 2016, the band announced plans to break-up following the release of a new album, titled With Regret, and a few international tours. On March 11, 2017, they played their final show to a sold-out crowd in their hometown of Milwaukee.

Zach Dear and Marcus Boldt would go on to form the band Stone, while Caleb Murphy would go on to form the band Inclination. In January 2018, Stone disbanded following a large wave of sexual assault accusations against Zach Dear, resulting in all members of both Expire and Stone publicly denouncing Zach and donating all band funds to RAINN.

== Members ==
- Josh Kelting – vocals
- Zach Dear – guitar
- Marcus Boldt – drums
- Caleb Murphy – bass

== Discography ==
Studio albums

- Pendulum Swings (2012)
- Pretty Low (2014)
- With Regret (2016)

EPs

- Grim Rhythm (2010)
- Suffer the Cycle (2011)
- Sink with Me (2012)

Splits

- Expire / Soul Control (2013)

Compilation albums

- Old Songs (2016)
