= Slapshot (band) =

American hardcore punk band

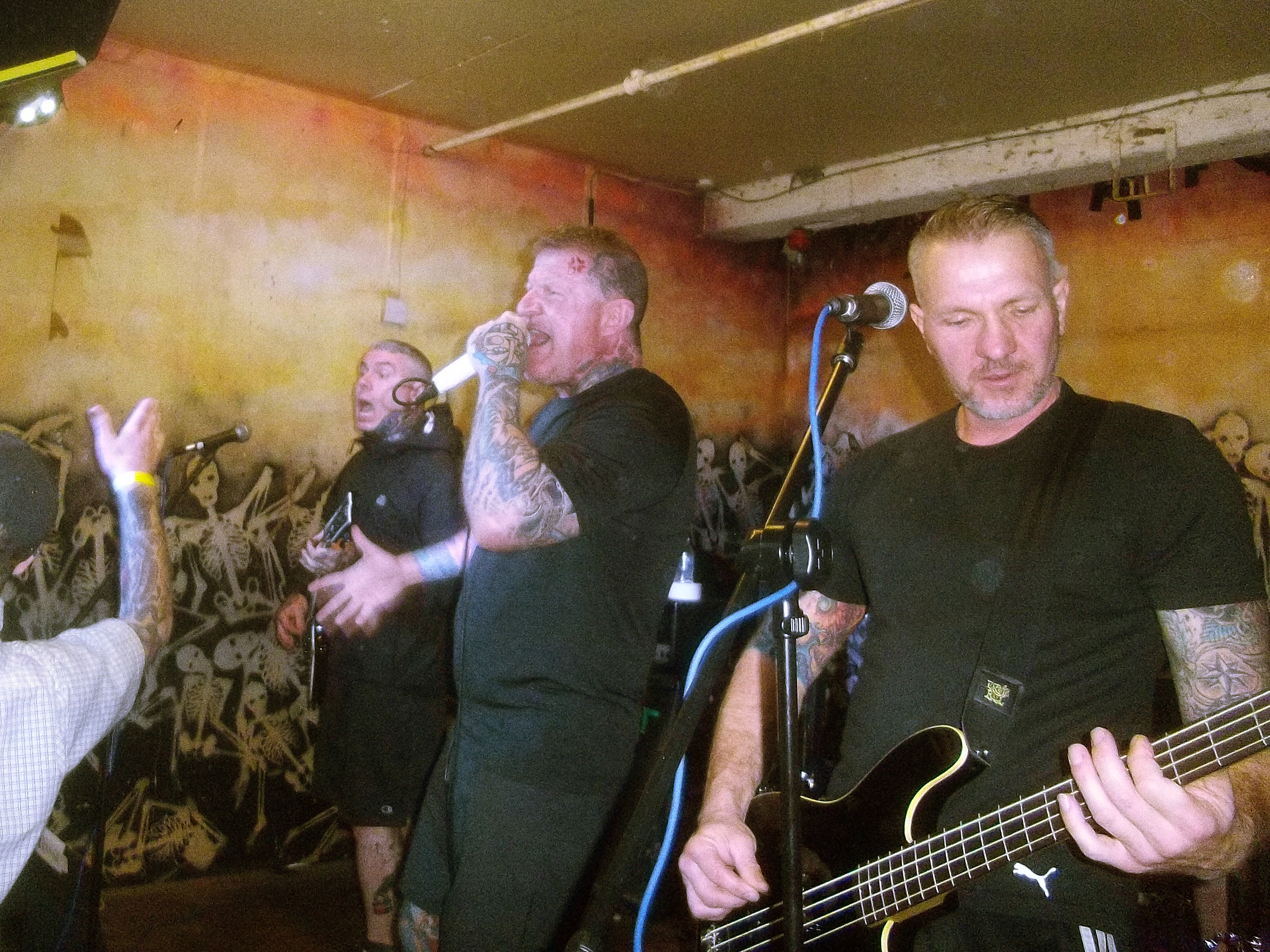
- Slapshot in 2023

Background information
- Origin: Boston, Massachusetts, U.S.
- Genres: Punk rock; hardcore punk
- Years active: 1985–2026
- Labels: Taang! Records, Bridge 9
- Past members: Jack "Choke" Kelly; Corey Koniz; Ryan Packer; Tye Tonkin; John Bean; Steve Risteen; Jonathan Anastas; Jordan Wood; Jamie Sciarappa; Barry Hite; Daniel Kaufman; Darryl Sheppard; Ed Lalli; Mike Bowser; Mark McKay; David Link; Craig Silverman; Joshua Hurst; Chris Lauria; Nick Charrette
- Website: oldtimehardcore.com

Slapshot was an American hardcore punk band from Boston, Massachusetts. Formed in 1985, the band released eight studio albums, along with numerous singles and EPs. Despite frequent lineup changes, founding member Jack "Choke" Kelly has remained the band's primary vocalist and only constant band member. They officially retired with their final show on October 17, 2026, also known as "Edge Day."

== History ==
=== Formation, Back on the Map, Step On It (1985-1988) ===
Slapshot was formed in 1985 by Steve Risteen and Mark McKay, formerly of Terminally Ill, Jack "Choke" Kelly, formerly of Negative FX and Last Rights, and Jonathan Anastas, formerly of Decadence and DYS. The group first came to fruition after Kelly repeatedly bumped into Risteen while shopping for groceries. This led to Risteen asking Kelly if he wanted to rehearse with his friend drummer Mark McKay, bass player Anastas soon joined the group rounding out the original lineup.

Slapshot's first album was a 24-track recording, instead of an 8/16-track album. Slapshot recorded the entire album at night, completing it in just four sessions to reduce the cost of recording. Back on the Map was later released by Taang! Records in 1986.

Slapshot experienced several lineup changes during its early years. Jordan Wood, who had previously played with S.T.P. and would later join Deathwish, initially joined as a second guitarist. After bassist Anastas left the group to pursue his education, Wood moved to bass. This lineup recorded the band's second album, Step On It, which was also released through Taang! Records. In 1989, the group's first two albums were later combined and issued as a compilation. During the mid-to-late 1980s Slapshot began to tour the US and Canada opening for acts such as Bad Brains, Gang Green, Agnostic Front and Circle Jerks.

=== Sudden Death Overtime (1988–1993) ===
In July 1988, Jamie Sciarappa, former bass player of SS Decontrol, joined the band and Jordan returned to his original slot as a second guitar player. This five-piece released their first 3-song promotional single titled Firewalker in 1989 including "Firewalker" and live recordings of "Chip on My Shoulder" and "Moment of Truth". From April 29, 1989 to May 27, 1989 Slapshot embarked on the "Witness The Hate" tour. The tour's opening night, with support from Full Circle and Scruffy Tearaways, occurred at Blondies in Detroit, Michigan. Their third studio album, Sudden Death Overtime, was then released in 1990, receiving positive reviews. Stewart Marson of AllMusic wrote about the album, stating "At a time when hardcore itself, never mind straight-edge, was on the ropes, Sudden Death Overtime proved that some bands were still in the game." The band then toured the U.S. in support of the album, the two legs took place in June and October, respectively, with the band playing shows in both the US and Canada. In February 1991, the band went on their first European tour which was also in support of the album.

Around the time the band began writing for their next album, Wood left, leaving Slapshot a single-guitarist band. Sciarappa would move to Los Angeles soon after Wood’s departure and was replaced with McKay and Chris Lauria. Yet another lineup change occurred when the band decided to fire Risteen later that same year. Darryl Sheppard was picked as his replacement.

This tumultuous period was discussed in the band's documentary "Chip On My Shoulder: The Cautionary Tale of Slapshot". They were then set for a U.S. tour, but Mark McKay told the band that he couldn't participate. Darryl Sheppard got Barry Hite, the drummer from his other band, to fill in for the tour. When Slapshot returned from the tour, McKay decided to officially quit the band. His departure was the result of multiple issues, mainly not having an interest in the material the group was writing for their next release.

=== Blast Furnace and Unconsciousness (1993–1994) ===
Their next album, Blast Furnace, was released in 1993 through We Bite Records. With this release, Slapshot evolved its sound while retaining its hardcore roots while also mixing industrial metal. At this point Kelly was the only original member left in the band, with Darryl Sheppard of Slaughter Shack, Barry Hite and Chris Lauria rounding out the rest of the lineup. The album was written in two weeks and recorded in three days, though the band was unsatisfied with the final result. Slapshot then toured Europe that spring. During the tour, the band recorded their first live album in Berlin called Live at SO36 which was also released via We Bite Records.

In 1994, Sheppard left the band and was replaced by Mike Bowser. They recorded their next album in Chicago with producer Steve Albini, ex-member of Big Black and producer for Nirvana. During this time, there was a lot of tension among the band, with Lauria not getting along with Hite and Hite not getting along with Kelly. Around the recording process of their third album Unconsciousness being recorded, ex-guitar and bass player Jordan Wood committed suicide. This brought Mark McKay back into the group socially and ultimately back into the band. Unconsciousness was released later that year via We Bite Records.

In August 1994, Slapshot embarked on a lengthy European tour with Ignite the two would release a split 7-inch record was to help promote the tour. The tour began with a performance at the Hultsfred Festival in Sweden on August 11, and concluded in Germany on October 4. Over the course of 54 days, Slapshot performed 50 shows across seven countries. After returning home, Chris Lauria persuaded Jack Kelly to bring Mark McKay back into the band's lineup.

With both Blast Furnace and Unconsciousness, the band ventured away from their hardcore sound into a more hard rock territory. Lead singer Choke later commented on the sound change, stating:

Well you know after doing hardcore for a few years, everyone was starting to change and do something a little different. You think you're doing what's right, you think you're doing what you're into at the moment. Everyone was listening to Soundgarden and Nirvana and the whole grunge thing was getting pretty big. I was really into industrial bands like Ministry. You know what you like to do is probably not what the band should be doing at that period of time and you sort of get out of your comfort zone and do some things that you're into at the time, but maybe some other people are not that into.

=== Return to hardcore sound/mini hiatus, 16 Valve Hate and Olde Tyme Hardcore (1995-1999) ===
Upon the return of original drummer Mark McKay, Slapshot returned to the studio to record their album, 16 Valve Hate which was released by Lost & Found Records in Europe and Taang! Records in North America in 1995. The album featured a cover of the Smiths song, "Big Mouth Strikes Again" (1986). Choke later recalled "When we were recording '16 Valve Hate' we kind of suddenly decided to do 'Big Mouth Strikes Again' and throw it together on the spot. A lot of the songs on that record were written in the studio on the day they were recorded. It was just one of those things where everything kind of came together that day." German music review site Visions.de wrote "16 Valve Hate is back to rocking like the old days: 13 songs of straightforward Boston hardcore, devoid of metal ballast and stupid moshing." Following the album’s release Slapshots relationship with Lost & Found Records became sour, with Slapshot accusing the label off not playing them. According to McKay, the band has never received any royalties for the sales of 16 Valve Hate by Lost & Found Records.

On August 25, 1995, the band set off on their most ambitious tour to date in support of 16 Valve Hate. With Doug McKinnon filling in for Mark McKay, Slapshot played over 60 shows in 8 countries with only 4 days off. Just under a year later Slapshot returned to the studio with the same lineup to record Olde Tyme Hardcore which was released via Taang! Records in 1996. The album was a return to the band's roots with an "old-school" hardcore sound and featured a cover of the SSD song "Get It Away".

In early 1996, Century Media Records invited Slapshot to take the headlining spot on the Crossover 2000 European tour. However things went poorly, from the beginning, and only got worse as the tour went on. Around three weeks into the tour, Lauria, became frustrated and worn out, which resulted in him ditching the band to return home. This led to Brian Omer, who was already performing with another group on the tour taking his place, and finishing out the remaining dates with Slapshot. The band quickly returned to Europe just two weeks later, once again embarking on a two-and-a-half-week club tour with John Madden [ex-Doc Hopper] on bass filling in for the absent Lauria. This tour featured Slapshot's first appearance at the Full Force Festival in Germany on June 23, 1996, where they opened for Motörhead and Ministry.

In July 1997, Slapshot played what would be their last concert in the United States for five years, in Plymouth, Massachusetts. For a long time, it looked as if this show was going to be their last show ever. The concert was videotaped for local TV. During the post show interview, Kelly noted that he didn't know if it was Slapshot's last show or not, adding "every show can be the last, but then again, they might come out a few years later and do another show."

Things then went quiet, leading people to believe the band had disbanded. However, they then returned to tour Europe in 1999, including a stop at the Graspop Metal Meeting in Belgium. Former band members still couldn't get along, so Chris Lauria and Steve Risteen wouldn't participate, leading to David Link coming in as the replacement. In December 1999, a Slapshot tribute album called Boston Drops the Gloves: A Tribute to Slapshot was released by Flat Records and San Francisco-based TKO Records. The album included covers by 22 Boston bands.

=== Greatest Hits, Slashes and Crosschecks, Digital Warfare and Tear it Down (2001–2008) ===
In 2001, Slapshot released a new album entitled Greatest Hits, Slashes and Crosschecks released via King Fisher and Century Media. The album featured re-recorded and re-mastered versions of classic songs along with two brand new recordings. This would be the last album to feature Mike Bowser on guitar and the only recorded material with David Link on bass.

In 2002, the band went on another European tour, featuring the return of Chris Lauria. Later that same year, Slapshot played a 15-minute surprise set at The Hideaway in Cambridge, Massachusetts as part of a show alongside Poison Idea, Kill Your Idols, Thumbs Up! and others. Despite being a short set, it resulted in the band having a full show booked at The Hideaway for October 13, 2002. However, the club closed days before the show was scheduled to take place. 13 days later on October 26, 2002, they played at the "6th annual Back to School Jam" in Framingham, Massachusetts. The event also featured Blood for Blood, Converge, Reach The Sky, Panic, No Warning, Some Kind of Hate and a set by Kelly’s other band, Stars & Stripes. The event marked the first show Slapshot played in the US in over five years.

Soon after Mike Bowser moved to New York for a new job opportunity. The would end up finding a replacement in Ed Lalli. Ever since the band's 1996 crossover tour, Kelly had been contemplating disbanding the group. However this changed when Lauria called Kelly and suggested working on a new album. So they then returned to the studio for 2003's Digital Warfare released via I Scream Records. This album saw the band return to their more aggressive/intense style. Scott Bolton writing for Rough Edge gave the album a positive review stating "Amazingly, this is the band's first studio album in seven years. You'd never know it. Digital Warfare is a furious, raging ass-kicking disc with nary a low point." In late 2003 Slapshot headlined a European tour with Blood for Blood and The Blues Bloods serving as support.

In 2005 Slapshot released a 7-song EP Tear It Down (Thorp Records), this record was one of Slapshot's more serious and politically minded releases, focusing on wartime paranoia. It also featured one of their more controversial songs "Fuck New York", along with several more European tours, including joining All, 7 Seconds, Walls Of Jericho, and Unearth on the 2004 Eastpak Resistance Tour. In 2005 they embarked on the Pope's Dead, You're Next tour alongside Champion and Some Kind of Hate.

In 2006, an announcement was posted on Slapshot’s official website stating that the group were defunct. Around a year later, on June 30, 2007, they returned to play a set at the Significant Fest 2007 in Clearwater, Florida. They also played with Killing Time, 108 and Uppercut, and in July 2008, they played multiple European dates, along with an appearance at the Full Force festival in Germany. These would be the last shows with Ed Lalli on guitar.

On November 8, 2008, Slapshot played a show at Anchors Up in Haverhill, Massachusetts on November 8, 2008, with Ten Yard Fight, Step Forward, and Word For Word. They then embarked on a Winter Tour with Energy and All For Nothing, later that year which seen the return of former guitarist Mike Bowser resulting in the reformation of the Olde Tyme Hardcore and 16 Valve Hate lineup.

Following returning from the tour, Slapshot took part in the "2008 Hometown Throwdown" in Boston on December 28 at the Middle East with The Mighty Mighty Bosstones. Choke joined the Bosstones on stage during their cover of the Slapshot song "What's at Stake".

=== Slapshot documentary and I Believe EP (2009–2013) ===
On April 24, 2009, the world premiere of the Slapshot documentary film "Chip On My Shoulder: The Cautionary Tale of Slapshot" took place at the Brattle Theatre in Cambridge, Massachusetts to a sold-out audience as part of the Boston Independent Film Festival. Following its premiere, the film was screened as part of a hardcore festival in Toronto, Canada, which also featured performances by Negative Approach and Supertouch. The film was also screened at the Salt Lake City Film Festival in August 2009. The film was directed and produced by Ian McFarland (Blood for Blood) and Anthony "Wrench" Moreschi (Ten Yard Fight) of Killswitch Productions and was later released on DVD by Taang! Records.

In 2009, Lauria switched from bass to guitar and Slapshot embarked on a tour of Europe in August, for a ten-date tour. Joining them on support was Frigate, a band featuring Lauria alongside Linda Bean of Stars & Stripes. The tour was dubbed the "2009 Replacements Tour."

By 2010, Slapshot had another new lineup featuring Kelly, longtime member Lauria back on bass, John Bean on drums and Craig Silverman (formerly of Only Living Witness) on guitar. The group spent the first half of the year working on new material in hopes of having songs recorded by the end of the year. They then played the "Gallery East" reunion show in August 2010 along with several European shows.

In 2012, Lauria left the band once again being replaced by Nick Charrette. During the Spring the group embarked on a European headlining tour. On June 6, 2012, Slapshot released a three song EP titled I Believe via Taang! Records making it the band's 11th release on Taang. In November and December of that year Slapshot held a European tour with New Morality serving as support. Ryan Packer joined as a permanent replacement on bass in later that same year. During a live show in Florida in January 2013, Slapshot had their banner stolen by a member of the audience, however the show promoter knew who the man was that had stolen it and quickly recovered it and gave it back to the band.

=== Self-titled, Make America Hate Again (2014–2024) ===
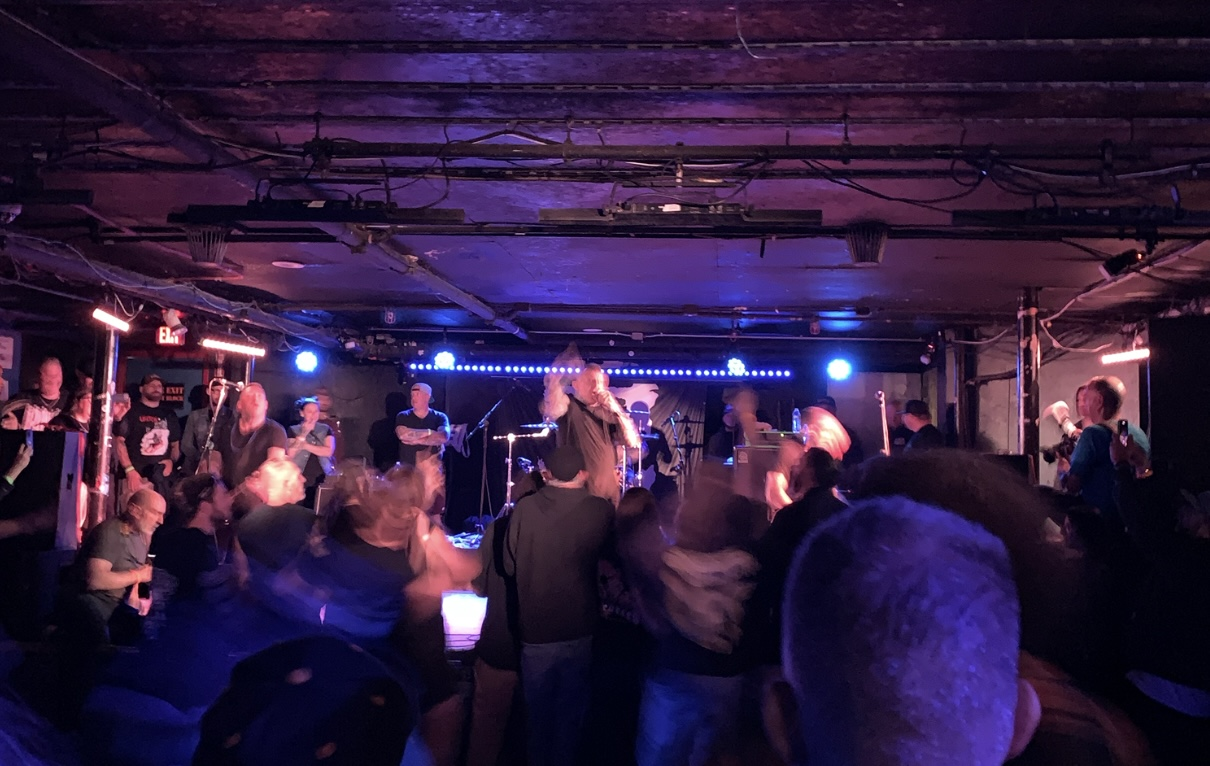
Slapshot live at The Middle East in 2024

In 2014, the band went on tour in Australia for the first time, recording a song specifically for the tour titled "Everything Wants To Kill You". Later that same year, they released their 6th studio album, a self-titled record, and went on another European tour. On April 18, the band performed at that year's New England Metal and Hardcore Fest. Benny Grotto joined the band in November 2014. That same month guitarist Craig Silverman joined Agnostic Front and began playing in both bands simultaneously. On January 15, 2015, Slapshot released a music video for the song "I Told You So" which is a rarity for the band. Kelly stated in an interview "We only had 4 hours to shoot the video and had very limited resources. [The] goal of the video was to create a raw, gritty, unique and in your face music video."

In February 2015, the band flew to the Netherlands to play a secret one-off show for a Dutch friend's birthday party in a small bar in Goes.

In 2016, the band went on a tour in Europe and the U.S. They also performed at Boston University's Agganis Arena as part of a special St. Patrick's Week run by Dropkick Murphy. Douglas Mackinnon also took over on drums. They also released a live album, Blood Bath in Germany, which was originally recorded in on September 13th, 1995 in Esterhofen, Germany.

In early 2017, Slapshot embarked on a European tour alongside fellow Massachusetts band Dropkick Murphys. Following this the band held their own European headlining dates in August, October and November of that year.

In 2018, Corey Koniz replaced Douglas Mackinnon on drums. On March 27, 2018, Slapshot announced their 8th studio album Make America Hate Again would be released on June 1, 2018, via Bridge 9 Records. The first single, "Remedy," was released on April 6, 2018. Robert F., reviewing for Scene Point Blank, said that unlike most "old-tyme" hardcore bands that end up sounding like tired and worn-out stereotypes of their former selves, Slapshot completely avoided that issue with their songs sounding fresher than ever. They then followed up the album release with a U.S. tour supported by Brick By Brick and Unruly Boys. They also headlined Baroeg Open Air on July 1 of that year.

On March 18, 2019, Craig Silverman announced that he was quitting Slapshot via his Instagram page. Long-time friend of the band Tye Tonkin joined to play guitar in 2022. In June of that year Slapshot supported Sick of It All on multiple US tour dates.

In 2020, the band went on a 35th anniversary tour but had to postpone it due to the COVID-19 lockdowns. They then rescheduled the tour in 2021 and toured alongside Sheer Terror and Skull Crack in the "35 Years of Hardcore" tour. In May and June of 2022, Slapshot toured Europe.

After doing a few U.S. shows in 2023, the band embarked on another European tour along with a separate UK tour alongside Death Before Dishonor in the "Boston Takeover tour". In 2024, the band went on an East Coast tour along with Ignite, Death by Stereo, and School Drugs. Later that same year, they toured Europe alongside Ignite in celebration of the first time the two bands toured together in 1994.

=== Farewell tour and retirement (2025-2026 ) ===
Slapshot performing during their final concert 2026

In late 2024, Slapshot announced that the band would retire in 2025: "...after 40 unforgettable years, we, SLAPSHOT, are announcing our retirement in 2025. This decision comes after an incredible journey filled with passion, hard work, trials and tribulations and a lot of fun." The band then went on an extensive final European tour, titled "The Hang Up Your Boots" tour. At a show in Eindhoven, bass player Ryan Packer said the band would play their last ever European show at the Dutch festival Revolution Calling which took place on November 22, 2025.

The band announced they will be playing three final U.S. shows in 2026. The first will be in April at the Rodeoi Fest III in Nashville, Tennessee, and the second will take place at the BNB Bowl in New York on May 22. Their farewell tour will also consist of a July tour in Japan alongside Aggressive Dogs.

Slapshot played their farewell show on straight edge day on October 17, 2026, at the sold out Big Night Live in Boston. The opening acts for the show were Agnostic Front, Bold, DYS, Restraining Order, Wisdom in Chains, Béton Armé, Time X Heist, Aggressive Dogs, and Neighborhood Shit. The event seen the band play 25 songs along with numerous video packages played in between songs. Former guitarist Craig Silverman re-joined the band to play the entire set and former drummer Mark McKay also performed multiple tracks. Have Heart vocalist Pat Flynn made an appearance and performed one song.

== Artistry ==
Slapshot emerged from the early Boston hardcore scene, and became known for speaking out against people and lifestyles they were against, such as in their songs "Fuck New York", "Rap Sucks", "Shoot Charlton Heston", "Stupid Fucking Kids" and "Crossover Sucks". Being a straight edge band, their lyrics also touch upon substance abuse, and their "Straight Edge In Your Face" lyrics have been cited as "the crux of the straight edge movement's beliefs" in Boston. Some of their lyrics have resulted in feuds with other bands.

Throughout the band's tenure, their songs were known for aggression and fast tempos, with Choke providing strong vocals. Revolver Magazine wrote that the band "took inspiration from the straight-edge philosophies of Minor Threat and Co., but had more in common with the stompy sound of the nascent NYHC scene."

They were also known for their live shows, sometimes getting into fights with members of the crowd. Choke performed some shows cut up with blood on his face.

The band are also big hockey fans. Lead singer Choke played hockey growing up and was a Boston Bruins season ticket holder. The sport has inspired many of the band's album covers. Choke stated that the band's name came when they were throwing hockey inspired names around until former guitarist Steve Risteen said "Hey, what about that movie Slap Shot?"

== Stars and Stripes ==
In 1989, Jack Kelly, Jordan Wood and Mark McKay formed Stars and Stripes as a side project. The band played typical English Oi! in the style of 4-Skins and Red Alert, blending American hardcore punk elements. In 1989, a 7" EP called Drop the Bomb was released on the US label Vulture Rock. Shortly thereafter, Jack Kelly released their debut album, Shaved for Battle, on his own label, Patriot Records. With the original lineup, the band played a single gig in Allston, Massachusetts on November 11, 1989. Also present that evening were other Patriot Records bands Forced Reality and The Bruisers. Jeff Morris and Scotty Davies from The Bruisers were hired for later live concerts. The band remained inactive until 2002. Many of the lyrics were centered around political issues and contained strong patriotic slant, which Jack Kelly claims were meant to be ironic. During the band’s first European tour in 1991, Kelly was questioned about the band having far-right sympathies. He referred to the lyrics as a "joke and provocation" Chris Lauria then joined the lineup as a permanent bassist and the group began performing again. In 2002, the second album, One Man Army, was released. Unlike the previous album, Jack Kelly stated that this album had nothing to do with politics and was solely about football hooligans. With all the members also being part of Slapshot, they would occasionally play live shows as both bands. In 2015, they released their third album Battle of The States.

== Legacy ==
By the mid-1980s, Boston's early hardcore movement had largely fizzled out, with many of the original bands such as SSD shifting towards heavy metal. Slapshot went on to become one of the driving forces in the resurrection of hardcore in the Boston area. Since then, the band has become one of the more prominent hardcore bands to come out of Massachusetts. The band, alongside their debut album Back on the Map, are also credited with making significant contributions to the rise of straight edge ideology in Boston. Johnathan R., reviewing for Jankysmooth, stated "I've never seen so much Boston represented in a band." Slapshot, along with SSD, In My Eyes and Blood for Blood, have been viewed as essential to the ethos and energy of Boston's hardcore scene. The group were also quite influential abroad in European countries such as Germany or Belgium, where their raw style inspired a wave of late-'80s and '90s hardcore acts. Their popularity abroad often eclipsed their U.S. following. Converge guitarist Kurt Ballou credited Slapshot for opening his eyes to the nationwide spread of hardcore and not just a regional scene, while Wes Eisold of American Nightmare considered Slapshot "mandatory listening" for him getting into hardcore. In 1999, a tribute album titled Boston Drops the Gloves was released by TKO Records and features Slapshot covers by 22 Boston area punk bands.

== Members ==
Former

- Jack "Choke" Kelly – vocals (1985–2026)
- Ryan Packer – bass (2012–2015, 2018–2026)
- Corey Koniz – drums (2018–2026)
- Tye Tonkin – guitar (2022–2026)
- Steve Risteen – guitar (1985–1992)
- Darryl Sheppard – guitar (1993–1994)
- Mike Bowser - guitar (1994–2003, 2008–2009, 2016–2017)
- Ed Lalli - guitar (2003–2007)
- Craig Silverman - guitar (2010–2016, 2018–2019, 2026 final show)
- Jonathan Anastas – bass (1985–1987)
- Jordan Wood - bass (1987–1988), guitar (1986–1987, 1988–1992)
- Jamie Sciarappa - bass (1988–1992)
- Chris Lauria – bass (1993–2012, 2016–2018)
- Mark McKay - drums (1985–1992, 1994–2009, 2026 final show)
- Barry Hite – drums (1993–1994)
- John Bean - drums (2010–2016)
- Douglas Mackinnon - drums (2016–2018)
- Nick Charrette - bass (2012)
- Joshua Hurst - bass (one European tour)

Timeline

== Discography ==
Studio albums

- Step On It (1988, Taang!)
- Sudden Death Overtime (1990, Taang!)
- Unconsciousness (1994, We Bite)
- 16 Valve Hate (1995, Lost and Found)
- Olde Tyme Hardcore CD/12" (1996, Century Media)
- Digital Warfare (2003, I Scream)
- Slapshot (2014, Olde Tyme, Brass City Boss Sounds)
- Make America Hate Again (2018, Bridge 9)

EPs and splits

- Back on the Map 12-inch (1986, Taang!)
- Same Mistake / Might Makes Right 7-inch (1988, Taang!)
- Firewalker 7-inch (1990, Taang!)
- Blast Furnace (1993, We Bite)
- Slapshot / Ignite split 7-inch (1994, Lost and Found)
- The New England Product Session 7-inch (2004, Bridge 9)
- Tear It Down CD/7" (2005, Thorp, Spook City)
- I Believe 7-inch (2012, Taang!)
- Limited Tour Edition 2012 7-inch (2012, S.J.)
- Everything Wants to Kill You 7-inch (2014, Old School Cartel, Brass City Boss Sounds)

Live albums

- Live at SO36 12-inch/CD (1993, We Bite)
- Live in Germany VHS (1993, We Bite)
- Super Pro Hardcore CD (2005, self-released)
- Blood Bath in Germany (2016, Street Justice)

Compilation albums

- The CD (1989, Taang!)
- Greatest Hits, Slashes And Crosschecks (2001, KINGfisher, Century Media)

Music Videos

- "Told You So" (2015)

== See also ==
- Boston hardcore
