= Make America Hate Again =

Studio album by Slapshot
- Released: June 1, 2018
- Genre: Hardcore punk
- Length: 23:20
- Label: Bridge 9

Slapshot chronology
Slapshot (2014)	Make America Hate Again (2018)

Make America Hate Again is the eighth and final studio album by the American hardcore band Slapshot. It was released on June 1, 2018 via Bridge 9 Records. It is the only album to feature drummer Corey Koniz.

== Background ==
The album was recorded at the Wild Arctic in Portsmouth, New Hampshire. The instrumentation was recorded by the end of 2016, but vocals were not recorded until August 2017 due to lead singer Jack Kelly taking an extended period of time to write the lyrics for the album. So the band and the label decided to wait until 2018 to release the album.

Although the album title references the "Make America Great Again" campaign slogan, vocalist Jack "Choke" Kelly has maintained that the lyrics are not political, stating that the title track is about "finally putting an end to this constant politeness in the States."

Kelly noted that the album was less aggressive than previous releases. As lyrically, he found writing for Make America Hate Again to be a challenge, noting that it had become harder with age as he feels he has fewer things to be angry about. As a result, he focused deeper topics and past events."

== Release and promotion ==
Slapshot announced the album’s release on March 27, 2018. In an interview with Decibel Jack Kelly commented on the album stating "More violence, More brutality. More hate, hate, hate. More cat memes. It’s all you expect from Slapshot and more."

The albums first and only single "Remedy," was released on April, 6 2018. The album was officially released on June, 1, 2018. Slapshot headlined a short West Coast tour in support of the album alongside Brick By Brick and Unruly Boys.

== Reception ==
Professional ratings
Review scores
Source	Rating
Away From Life	4/5 stars
metal.de	6/10 stars
Ox-Fanzine	4/5 stars
Scene Point Blank	7/10 stars
Visions	7/12 stars

Make America Hate Again received mixed-to-positive reviews from independent music publications. Ox-Fanzine described the record as a "brilliant late album" and compared the style to Hatebreed, while Marek Protzak, writing for metal.de, criticized the songs for "[lacking] something truly lasting or standout." Shawn Macomber of Decibel dubbed the album "the Friday the 13th: The Final Chapter of Slapshot albums." Calling it "a powerful offering on which creator fully understands creation and, firing on all cylinders, all previous wrinkles ironed out, carries the conceit to its gnarliest, deadliest end."

== Track listing ==
All tracks are written by Jack Kelly, Ryan Packer and Craig Silverman.

No.	Title	Length
1.	"Edge Break Your Face"	1:16
2.	"Hypocrite"	2:07
3.	"Remedy"	1:18
4.	"Alone"	2:42
5.	"Cry For Help"	1:13
6.	"Trainwreck"	2:29
7.	"I Got Your Number"	1:58
8.	"It’s All About You"	3:30
9.	"Make America Hate Again"	2:08
10.	"White Flag"	2:07
11.	"One Last Chance"	2:43
Total length:		23:20

== Personnel ==
Slapshot

- Jack "Choke" Kelly – lead vocals
- Craig Silverman – guitar
- Ryan Packer – bass
- Corey Koniz – drums

Technical personnel

- Chris Wrenn – production, design
- Brad Boatright – engineering
- Mick Lambrou – artwork
