= The Stains (Maine) =

American punk band from Portland, Maine

The Stains were an American punk band from Portland, Maine, United States, started in 1979 and lasted until Feb. 1983, and were led by guitarist George Ripley and vocalist Dave Buxton, Beth Blood and Ira Nulton on bass as well as Joe Potter on drums. Lead guitarists in the studio and in live performance included Dave Morton, Steve Soma, Marc English, Gary Gogel, and Roger Miller. The Stains released a 7" EP on Gutterworst Records with the songs "Feel Guilty" and "Give Ireland Back To The Snakes" on one side, and "Sick Of Being Sick" and "Submission" on the other. A posthumous album was released on the same label in 1989, featuring 15 more songs recorded between 1979 and 1983. Ripley and Potter along with Beth Blood moved on to form a garage rock band called GHOST WALKS.

The Portland Stains did not move to Boston until 1981, and are not to be confused with Steve Stain; a Boston-area punk performance artist who often borrowed musicians from various Boston rock bands to back him up when he was performing, and who sometimes billed his impromptu band as "The Stains".
