= Ruiner (band) =

American hardcore punk band

- Origin: Baltimore, Maryland, U.S.
- Genres: Hardcore punk, melodic hardcore
- Years active: 2004–2010; 2016–present
- Labels: Bridge Nine Records, 1917 Records
- Past members: Rob Sullivan; Stephen Smeal; Danny Porter; Dustin Thornton; TJ Catalfo; Joey Edwards; Mitch Roemer; Joe Redd

Ruiner is an American hardcore punk band from Baltimore, Maryland, United States.

== History ==
On October 5, 2004, Ruiner played their first show and released their first three-song demo. On May 5, 2005, they released a 7” EP “What Could Possibly Go Right…” through Firestarter and Gravemistake Records. At the end of the summer in 2005, Ruiner signed with 1917 Records.

Lyrically, Ruiner touched on personal sentiments such as disillusion with the world, desolation, lost love, self-loathing and disappointment.

Ruiner played over 200 shows in their first year and half in existence and in their second year, the band headed to Europe for 31 shows in ten countries. The band toured all over the world including Europe six times, Australia twice, as well as tours through Southeast Asia, China, and Japan, and many tours through Canada and Mexico. Bridge Nine Records released their debut album, Prepare To Be Let Down, in 2007.

In 2009, Ruiner took a break from touring and returned to Baltimore to work on writing their new album. The band headed to the studio in July with producer J. Robbins, and recorded the tracks for what would become Hell Is Empty.

On October 9, 2010, Ruiner played their final show and announced their break up.

The band reunited in 2016, and has resumed touring.

== Members ==
=== Final lineup ===
- Rob Sullivan – Vocals (2004-2010),(2016–present)
- Stephen Smeal – Bass (2004-2010),(2016–present)
- Danny Porter – Guitar (2004-2010),(2016–present)
- Dustin Thornton – Guitar (2007-2010),(2016–present)
- Joey Edwards - (2005-2009),(2016–present)

=== Previous members ===
- TJ Catalfo – Drums (2009-2010) (died 2026)
- Mitch Roemer – Guitar (2004-2007)
- Joe Redd – Drums (2004-2005)

== Discography ==
=== Studio albums ===
- Prepare to Be Let Down (2007), Bridge Nine Records
- Hell Is Empty (2009), Bridge Nine Records

=== Demos, singles and EPs ===
- Demo (2004), Silly Girl Records
- What Could Possibly Go Right (2005), Firestarter Records/Grave Mistake Records
- Ruiner & Day of the Dead (2007), Vendetta Records/Burn Bridges - Split EP with Day of the Dead
- The Lives We Fear (2007), Bridge Nine Records
- Dead Weight (2007), Bridge Nine Records
- Under the Influence Vol. 14 (2011), Vinyl Collective/Suburban Home Records - Split EP with Attica! Attica!

=== Compilation albums ===
- I Heard These Dudes Are Assholes (2008) - Bridge Nine Records
