= Sudden Death Overtime (album) =

Studio album by Slapshot
- Released: January 1, 1990
- Studios: Fort Apache, Cambridge, Massachusetts
- Genre: Hardcore punk
- Length: 36:05
- Label: Tang

Slapshot chronology
Step On It (1988)	Sudden Death Overtime (1990)	Unconsciousness (1993)

Sudden Death Overtime is the third studio album by the American hardcore band Slapshot. It was released on January 1, 1990, via Tang Records. It was the only album to feature bass player Jamie Sciarappa and the last to feature guitarist Steve Risteen.

The album features a cover of the Jefferson Airplane song "White Rabbit". It also includes two live tracks of their songs "Chip on My Shoulder" and "Moment of Truth".

A limited Edition, Red Repress, was released in 2018.

== Background and reception ==
Professional ratings
Review scores
Source	Rating
AllMusic	3.5/5 stars
Rough Edge	3/5 stars
Sputnik Music	3/5 stars

The album was recorded in Fort Apache studio in Cambridge, Massachusetts. The album brought the band to a 5-piece with the addition of Jaimie Sciarappa on bass and Jordan Bass moving to guitar. Leading up to the release of the album Slapshot released a three track single titled Firewalker in 1989 including "Firewalker" and the live recordings of "Chip on My Shoulder" and "Moment of Truth"". The full album was released on January 1, 1990. The album features a mixture of fast, maniacal hardcore with angry street punk, commandeered by the lead singer Jack "Choke" Kelly.

Stewart Mason reviewing for AllMusic stated "no metal moves by the guitarists, no plodding, weed-infused Black Sabbath-like dirge tempos from the rhythm section, no dorky growling from singer Choke Kelly, just straight-ahead straight-edge. The tempos are a hair slower, perhaps, but songs like 'Punk's Dead, You're Next' and the righteous 'War on Drugs' bristle with well-directed anger. At a time when hardcore itself, never mind straight-edge, was on the ropes, Sudden Death Overtime proved that some bands were still in the game."

== Track listing ==
All tracks are written by Jack Kelly, except where noted.

No.	Title	Writer(s)	Length
1.	"What's At Stake"		3:29
2.	"Firewalker"		2:23
3.	"Dealing With Pennies"		2:00
4.	"Transmission"		2:47
5.	"Something to Prove"		2:28
6.	"National of Hate"		3:09
7.	"Punks Dead, You're Next"		3:36
8.	"Say Goodbye"		2:52
9.	"War On Drugs"		3:08
10.	"Get Me Out"		2:15
11.	"Change"		1:41
12.	"White Rabbit"	Grace Slick	4:22
13.	"Chip On My Shoulder" (live)		2:24
14.	"Moment of Truth" (live)		1:31
Total length:			36:05

== Personnel ==
Slapshot

- Jack "Choke" Kelly – lead vocals
- Jordan Bass – guitar
- Steve Risteen – guitar
- Jamie Sciarappa – bass
- Mark Mckay – drums

Technical personnel

- Rich Spillberg – engineer, photography
- Tim O'Heir – engineer, producer
- Paul Slifer – cover drawing
- Jane Gulick – graphic design
- Frank White – photography
