= Gallery East =

Coordinates: 42°21′4.92″N 71°3′23.57″W

Gallery East is an art and performance network based in Boston, Massachusetts notable for being one of the first venues to host hardcore punk rock shows for an all-ages audience. Founded in 1979 by Duane Lucia and Al Ford, it closed its location at 24 East St. in 1983, but re-emerged in 2006 as a driving force that continues to support up and coming artists and performers.

== History ==
=== Early history ===
Gallery East opened in December 1979 and quickly gained prominence as the home for Boston’s avant-garde and alternative culture. Founded by artist Al Ford and DIY pioneer Duane Lucia, Gallery East occupied a 5000-square-foot storefront at 24 East Street in Boston's Leather District near South Station.

Early shows featured up and coming visual artists such as David Barbero, Al Ford, Armand Saiia, Susan Shup and Pablo Hurtado, with some intermittent music performances by Gary Koepke, Samm Bennett, Paul Shapiro, and others. In the fall of 1980 the gallery expanded its performance programming to include poetry, dance, independent film, performance art, and photography. New young artists included Walter Tamasino, Kathy Hayes, Magnus Johnstone, Tony Millionaire, Mark Morrisroe, Steve Stain, Kevin Porter, Pia MacKenzie, Susan Hellewell and Robert Dombrowski.

By late 1980 it was the broad variety of live music that set the gallery apart from other art and performance venues in New England. In November, Wild Stares, Dangerous Birds, and The Neats staged shows at the gallery called Propeller Parties, an endeavor which later led to the founding of Propeller Records. Other bands who played these shows included Mission of Burma, Bound and Gagged, V, and The Stains. Art music, jazz and world sounds were also represented at the gallery with performances by Warren Senders, Raqib Hassan, Tony Vacca, Scott Robinson, Julian Thayer and others. Gallery East began to draw critical acclaim from local media, including the Boston Globe, who called it a "home for the avant-garde."

=== The Season of the One-Week Art Show ===
In the spring of 1981, Gallery East began mounting one week shows, which were much shorter than the traditional gallery exhibits in Boston. Sculptor, painter and musician Robert Rutman started things off in May with the "International Art Show". In June, Dark Week, which was described as a "boho free-for-all," featured alt-culture performances such as 24 bands lip syncing their own music, including performances by The Dark, Young Snakes, Red, Birdsongs of the Mesozoic, and Peter Dayton, as well as "The Wonderful World of Jesus" and The Dark's "89 Systems". In July the gallery hosted Polare Levine's work and Pink. Inc. amongst others. August was packed full of performances, including Kick Week, Take It! Magazine Week, and the Boston New York Fellowship Week.

=== Hardcore punk ===
In late August 1981, two local bands, SS Decontrol and The Freeze, took the stage at Gallery East and introduced hardcore punk to the city of Boston. It was billed as aggressive music: loud and fast songs lasting 30 seconds. Hand-drawn xeroxed flyers promoted the show as "xxx ALL AGES xxx."

Hardcore shows continued to supplement the art at the Gallery through 1982. The Boston Hardcore crew invited nationally known acts, including Minor Threat, T.S.O.L., MDC, Meatmen, Government Issue, and Necros, to appear on the same bill.

The Gallery continued to support other musical and artistic genres as well, including jazz shows, visual art, performance art events by companies such as Mobius Artists Group, more regular independent film screenings, and poetry readings.

=== Controversy ===
Gallery East was a vanity gallery; artist and performers rented wall and floor space, making the curatorial process minimal. It was criticized for this by the Boston art establishment, often being called a ‘glorified night club’. A number of artists in the Leather District even went as far to sign a petition asking the City of Boston licensing board to refrain from granting permits to the gallery and further criticized the board for underwriting the Gallery’s ‘nuisances’. On July 7, 1982 a hearing was held before the Boston Licensing Board to decide the case. Room 801 at New City Hall was filled with artists, musicians and performers, as well as kids who arrived with their parents. The City ruled in favor of the Gallery, based on its right to freedom of expression, as long as they continued to obtain the proper permits.

=== Closing ===
The gallery closed its space at 24 East Street in the winter of 1983. Both Ford and Lucia continued to stage shows throughout the Northeast.

== Current ==
Under Lucia's direction, Gallery East re-emerged in 2006 as a web-based network, which continues to contribute to the local and international art scene with art shows, performances and community events. Art exhibitions included two shows at Studio Soto: the "Sides Show" and "Living Large" paintings by Paola Savarino in conjunction with Fort Point Channel Open Studios, and an exhibit of Evenlyn Berde's paintings at the West End Museum. Other events include "Made in Massachusetts" at the Plymouth Independent Film Festival, Pink Inc. at the 4th Annual West End Children’s Festival, and the Gallery East Reunion Show, which was staged in conjunction with Gallery East's most current large-scale project, the production of a 90-minute film, xxx ALL AGES xxx: The Boston Hardcore Film documenting the origins of the Boston’s Hardcore music culture on which Lucia, director Drew Stone, and former WERS host Katy "the kleening lady" Goldman are collaborating.

== The Pointing Finger ==
Gallery East’s logo since 1979 has been a pointing index finger. Because of the Gallery’s sometimes association with Dada and the prevalent use of the pointing index finger by Dada artists, some have conjectured that the Gallery East logo was lifted, thereby identifying it with that particular anti-art movement. However, it was a pure coincidence. The deco-style pointing index finger was from a shipping label used on freight boxes and was found in a desk when the gallery moved into the 24 East Street location.
