= 16 Valve Hate =

Studio album by Slapshot
- Released: January 1, 1996
- Genre: Hardcore punk
- Length: 37:27
- Labels: Lost & Found/Tang

Slapshot chronology
Unconscious (1994)	16 Valve Hate (1996)	Digital Warfare (2003)

16 Valve Hate is the fifth studio album by the American hardcore band Slapshot. It was originally released in Germany 1995 via Lost & Found Records. It was then released in the United States on January 1, 1996, by Tang Records.

A limited-edition reissue was released in 2018.

== Background ==
The album saw the return of the band's original drummer Mark McKay and was recorded in the outpost studio in Stoughton, Massachusetts. The recording studio's original digital master tape used for the lone production master CD was then sent to Sony DADC in Austria and released by German punk label Lost & Found Records in 1995. It was re-released by Tang Records on January 1, 1996, however the band the band couldn't get the original artwork which Lost & Found Records had done by themselves on the first album. Resulting in the U.S. release having completely different cover art. The US version also featured two additional tracks If You Had and I Knew I'd Lose. The album was a return to the band's hardcore sound, after their previous releases were more experimental and ventured into hard rock territory.

The album features a cover of the Smiths' song "Bigmouth Strikes Again". Lead singer Jack Kelly stated in an interview, "When we were recording 16 Valve Hate we kind of suddenly decided to do 'Big Mouth Strikes Again' and throw it together on the spot. A lot of the songs on that record were written in the studio on the day they were recorded. Was just one of those things were everything kind of came together on the day." Kelly has stated that the album is the best the band ever created.

== Reception ==
Professional ratings
Review scores
Source	Rating
AllMusic	3.5/5 stars
Visions.de	8/12 stars
Ox-Fanzine	Positive

German music review Visions.de wrote "16 Valve Hate is back to rocking like the old days: 13 songs of straightforward Boston hardcore, devoid of metal ballast and stupid moshing. Overall, while not particularly innovative, it's precisely for that reason that it's appealing. As ever, Jack 'Choke' Kelly's throaty, slightly gurgling vocals define the image of the four ice hockey fans."

Stewart Mason of AllMusic added "16 Valve Hate is a fully aggro blast of old-school hardcore, so defiantly true to the style's roots that it sounds timeless instead of retro, complete with Jack Kelly's familiar hoarse but surprisingly expressive vocals."

== Track listing ==
All tracks are written by Jack Kelly, Chris Lauria and Blair Borden.

No.	Title	Length
1.	"Watch Me Bleed"	2:17
2.	"How Much Can I Take"	2:27
3.	"Secrets"	2:04
4.	"Do What You Want"	1:40
5.	"16 Valves Hate"	3:51
6.	"Teach Me to Kill"	3:30
7.	"Johnny Was"	2:57
8.	"The Truth Hurts"	2:09
9.	"Desensitized"	2:25
10.	"108"	2:14
11.	"I Want You Dead"	1:43
12.	"Bigmouth Strikes Again (The Smiths cover)"	3:04
13.	"L.O.S.E.R"	2:35
14.	"If You Had"	2:08
15.	"I Knew I'd Lose"	2:37
Total length:		37:27

== Personnel ==
Slapshot

- Jack "Choke" Kelly – lead vocals
- Mike Bowser – guitar
- Chris Lauria – bass
- Mark Mckay – drums

Technical personnel

- Rich Spillberg – engineer, photography
- James Siegel – recording
- Jason Richardson – artwork
- Karl Trout – graphic design
