= Negative FX =

American hardcore punk band

Background information
- Origin: Boston, Massachusetts
- Genres: Hardcore punk; thrashcore
- Years active: 1981-1982
- Labels: Taang! Records, Distortions Records, Reflex/Wolfpack Records
- Past members: Jack Kelly; Patrick Raftery; Rich Collins; Dave Bass

Negative FX was a hardcore punk band from Boston, formed in 1981. Though the band lasted only a short time, playing a total of five shows (six flyers exist), the band was well known for their involvement in the local straight edge scene of the early 1980s. Along with members of the bands DYS and SS Decontrol (SSD), Negative FX was part of the "Boston Crew", a group of social friends who traveled around the country with SSD and other Boston hardcore bands.

Negative FX played fast and unmelodic hardcore punk that often featured shouted gang vocals on the songs' choruses, which was influential in the development of thrashcore. The band members consisted of Patrick Raftery on guitar, Rich Collins on bass, Dave Bass on drums, and high-profile vocalist Jack Kelly, who frequently went by the name of "Choke". Kelly went on to form the bands Last Rights and Slapshot.

Negative FX released only one self-titled album, which was recorded in April and November 1982 at Radiobeat Studios in Kenmore Square, but was not released until 1984 on Taang! Records. It was rereleased on blue, red, clear and amber vinyl (all limited to approximately 500) by Taang! in 1989. In 2002, Belgian label Reflex/Wolfpack Records reissued the album under the name Discography & Live with the addition of a live version of "Might Makes Right", on black (limited to 1400), pink (limited to 100) and yellow (limited to 100) vinyl. Distortions Records issued the Government War Plans EP in 2003, consisting of early demos.

Successful punk rock band NOFX's name is a reference to this band. Eric Melvin had listened to Negative FX's one studio album, and when trying to come up with a name for his new band with Fat Mike, he suggested the name "NO-FX". Fat Mike agreed on the name (later dropping the hyphen), noting that "it was the best one so far".

== Discography ==
=== Studio albums ===
- Negative FX (1984, Taang! Records)

=== EPs ===
- Government War Plans EP (2003, Distortions Records)

=== Compilation albums ===
- Discography & Live (2002, Reflex/Wolfpack Records)
