= Bridge 9 Records =

American hardcore punk record label

Bridge Nine Records
- Founded: 1995
- Founder: Chris Wrenn
- Distributors: Caroline, Revelation
- Genre: Hardcore punk, Melodic hardcore, Post-hardcore, punk rock, indie rock
- Country of origin: United States
- Location: Beverly, Massachusetts
- Official website: bridge9.com

Bridge 9 Records is an American hardcore record label located outside Beverly, Massachusetts. Bridge Nine is owned by Chris Wrenn of Salem, Massachusetts, who began the label in 1995 and produced its first release in 1996.

In 2022, the label opened a record store.

== History ==
Chris Wrenn started Bridge 9 Records in 1995, when he was a sophomore in college. During labels early years Wrenn followed a DIY approach and funded the label by selling novelty bumper stickers to Hot Topic, which made him enough money to release two records a year throughout the 1990s. However when American Nightmare, signed with Bridge 9 they were the first band on the label willing to tour extensively, leading to Wrenn needing to find the money to invest in them. So in 1999, Wrenn along with many accomplices began to sell "Yankee’s suck" merchandise outside of Fenway Park, and with the revenue made by these sales, Bridge 9 was able to promote more bands, going from two bands in 1999, to 12 in 2001. Wrenn later remarked "The money I was making at Fenway Park basically allowed me to ramp up very, very quickly."

As American Nightmare began to grow Bridge 9 also gained more attention and throughout the 2000s they signed multiple prominent hardcore acts such as Have Heart, Death Before Dishonor, H_{2}O and Terror.

In 2008, New Found Glory’s EP Tip of the Iceberg became the first release on the label to reach the Billboard 200 peaking at number 136. During the 2010s the label began to work with legacy acts such as Agnostic Front, Crown of Thornz, DYS, Sick of It All, and Slapshot.

In September 2022, the label opened a record store in Beverly, Massachusetts, it shares the retail space with Sully’s which is Wrenn’s sports apparel company. The store also contains a warehouse where bands such as New Found Glory, American Nightmare, H2O, and Agnostic Front have performed.

In 2026, the Bridge 9 began a podcast hosted by Wrenn where he interviews various artists associated with the label.

== Name ==
The label is named as a metaphor for what Wrenn wanted to do in creating the label: bridge all parts of the hardcore scene into one label and then put his lucky number (nine) in the title.

== Bridge Nine bands ==
Current:

- Advent
- Alcoa
- Alpha & Omega
- American War Machine
- Antidote
- BoySetsFire
- Buried Alive
- Death Before Dishonor
- Dead Swans
- H_{2}O
- HEAVYHEX
- Ruiner

Former:

- After the Fall
- Agnostic Front
- Ambitions
- American Nightmare
- Anger Regiment
- Backtrack (disbanded)
- Beach Rats
- Beach Slang (disbanded)
- Bent Life
- Betrayed
- Blue Monday
- Breaker Breaker
- Breathe In
- Burn (active with Deathwish Inc.)
- Candy Hearts (disbanded)
- Carry On
- Ceremony (active with Relapse Records)
- Champion (disbanded)
- Cops and Robber
- Crime in Stereo (active with Pure Noise Records)
- Cross Me
- Crown of Thornz
- Cruel Hand (active with Hopeless Records)
- Dave Hause
- Dead Ending
- Death Threat
- Defeater (active with Epitaph Records)
- DYS
- Energy
- Expire (disbanded)
- F-Minus
- Foundation
- Gallows
- Good Time Boys
- Have Heart (disbanded)
- Hierophant
- Holding On
- Incendiary Device
- Iron Chic (active with SideOneDummy Records)
- Jesus Piece (disbanded)
- Lemuria (disbanded)
- Malfunction
- Malice at the Palace
- Mental
- Miles Away
- Modern Pain
- Moral Mazes
- Mother of Mercy
- Nervous Impulse
- New Found Glory (active with Pure Noise Records)
- No Turning Back
- No Warning
- Octaves
- On the Rise
- Outbreak
- Paint it Black (active with Revelation Records)
- Palehorse
- Panic
- Polar Bear Club (disbanded)
- Project X
- R.A. (Rude Awakening)
- Ramallah
- Reaching Forward
- Right Brigade
- Roll Call
- Shark Attack
- Sick of It All (active with Century Media Records)
- Silver Snakes
- Sinners & Saints
- Slapshot (disbanded)
- Some Kind of Hate
- Soul Control
- Spine
- Stand & Fight
- Strike Anywhere (active with Pure Noise Records)
- Striking Distance
- Sworn In
- Ten Yard Fight (disbanded)
- Terror (active with Flatspot Records)
- Test of Time
- The Allegators
- The Distance
- The Eulogy
- The Hope Conspiracy (active with Deathwish Inc.)
- The Proletariat (active with Boss Tuneage)
- The Trouble
- The Trust
- Think I Care
- Triple Threat
- True Love (MI)
- Underdog
- Verse (disbanded)
- Violent Sons
- War On Women
- What's Eating Gilbert
- Wrecking Crew

== Bibliography ==
- Fenway Punk: How a Boston Indie Label Scored Big on Baseball's Greatest Rivalry (2026)
