= Taang! Records =

American independent record label

- Founded: 1983
- Founder: Curtis Casella
- Genre: Punk rock, ska, heavy metal, alternative rock, ambient, Oi!, power pop, psychedelic
- Location: San Diego, California, United States,
- Official website: www.taang.com

Taang! Records is an independent record label with a roster of hardcore punk, punk rock, Oi!, power pop, ska, indie rock, psychedelic, and ambient artists and bands founded by Curtis Casella in Boston, Massachusetts in 1983.

== History ==
Taang! Records began as a singles-only label, recording acts in Boston's early hardcore and punk scene such as Gang Green, Negative FX, the Mighty Mighty Bosstones, and The Lemonheads. The name is an acronym for the phrase "Teen Agers Are No Good!" The label gained prominence with the rise of Boston hardcore in the punk culture of the 1980s which had strong ties to the scene in nearby Washington D.C. Additionally, popularity of the 45 rpm format in the punk and indie underground scene, and the network of independent distribution, zines, retail outlets, and college radio stations that had already developed around the format also contributed to the label's success. By the early 1990s, the label developed close ties to the punk scene in Southern California and moved its headquarters to San Diego, where it remains. Today, the Taang! catalogue includes over 200 releases in multiple formats, with international distribution.

=== 1983-1993 ===
Curtis Casella, a Boston native, started Taang! to promote the burgeoning Boston hardcore punk scene.

“In the early 80's, frustrated with the scene in Boston with all the greatest bands in the USA I felt that there should a place they could call home. No one else was doing it. Washington, DC had Dischord, UK. had No Future, Clay & Secret and Crass, LA had SST, Boston needed Taang!"

The label's first full-length release was Negative FX's self-titled album, which was recorded in 1982.

In 1986, Taang! released five vinyl titles: Burning in Water by Moving Targets, Back on the Map by Slapshot, Another Wasted Night by Gang Green, the 7-inch Mine Caroline by The Oysters, and a bonus 7-inch by The Lemonheads. Gang Green's Another Wasted Night spawned three videos that received MTV play, and their non-stop tour propelled sales of their release to upwards of 30,000 units. The label achieved wide airplay on college radio stations with releases from The Lemonheads and Bullet LaVolta, and expanded its repertoire to include acts with a more diverse sound such as Poison Idea, The Mighty Mighty Bosstones, Swirlies and Spacemen 3.

In 1992, Taang! produced an archival release of early material from San Diego hardcore band Battalion of Saints. Casella, who had been dividing his time between Los Angeles and Boston, moved the label's headquarters to Mission Beach, San Diego and simultaneously opened a retail outlet in Hollywood. Shortly after moving to San Diego, Taang! issued two releases by local ska band Buck-O-Nine (the album Barfly and the EP Water In My Head), which was spurred on by a national tour in support of the ska band The Specials.

=== 1994-1999 ===
In the mid- to late 1990s, there were no new signings and the label focused primarily on archival releases by bands such as: Cock Sparrer (four releases), The Adicts (three releases), The Business (seven releases), The Exploited (two releases), The Boys (two releases), Last Resort, The Ruts, Slaughter and The Dogs, and Stiff Little Fingers (two releases), a total of twenty-six releases over five years.

=== 2001-2006 ===
While operating in California, the label continued its focus on Boston-based bands. Full catalogue releases were produced for the Proletariat, Bruisers and The F.U.s. Bands such as Gang Green, Slapshot and Poison Idea, which had previously left Taang! for other labels returned, each producing new releases for the label.

=== 2007-2012 ===
In 2007, the label started to sign more new bands, including Everybody Out!, featuring Rick Barton of Dropkick Murphys, Bill Close of The Freeze and Sweeney Todd of The Dead Pets as well as Southern California's Evacuate, led by Mike Virus of Cheap Sex and The Virus, who released their debut in 2009. Taang! also released a DVD from Cheap Sex from San Diego.

An addition to the label in this period was Negative Approach. Marking the label's 200th release was their work Friends of No One, a lost six-song recording from 1984 that was discovered in 2009 in a basement in Detroit. Taang!'s next released Nothing Will Stand In Our Way, a full album by the band, which focused on its earliest recordings (a total of 53 songs). This record represented the first ever performance studio session practice as well as club show with the earliest photos of the band. In 2011 the label released works by two legendary bands from the San Francisco Bay area – Attitude Adjustment and Part Time Christians. Both releases contained the bands' complete recorded works and were released digitally as well as on vinyl editions. Attitude Adjustment released a new recording entitled No Way Back in 2012.

=== 2013-present ===
In 2013, the label announced plans to release a series of more than fifty vinyl records from its catalogue over the span of 10 years. In April 2014, the label released The First 10 Singles 1984-88, 7" Vinyl Box Set to celebrate the Boston-based punk label's 30th anniversary. Included in the box set were ten seven-inch discs. Each disc included a full re-creation of the original jacket except for the Oysters which was redone for this box set. There was also a 26-song CD that combined all of the musical selections. This vinyl boxset was limited to 2,000 numbered copies. The bands featured were Gang Green, Last Rights, Stranglehold, Noonday, Underground, Last Stand, Negative FX, Oysters, Lemonheads, Moving Targets, and Slapshot. There are plans to release the singles box set as an LP version as well as a CD in 2021.

== Artists ==
- The Adicts
- Anti-Heros
- Attitude Adjustment
- Battalion of Saints
- Ben Deily
- The Boys
- The Bruisers
- Buck-O-Nine
- Bullet LaVolta
- The Business
- Brandon Cruz
- Cheap Sex
- Cock Sparrer
- D.Y.S.
- The Dickies
- Dropkick Murphys
- Everybody Out!
- The Exploited
- The F.U.'s
- The Freeze
- The 4-Skins
- Gang Green
- Hard-Ons
- Jerry's Kids
- The Lemonheads
- Keith Levene
- Lyres
- The Mighty Mighty Bosstones
- Mission of Burma
- Moving Targets
- Negative Approach
- Negative FX
- Newtown Neurotics
- Poison Idea
- The Proletariat
- The Ruts
- Sam Black Church
- Slapshot
- Slaughter & The Dogs
- Sloppy Seconds
- Spacemen 3
- Spore
- SSD
- Stars & Stripes
- Stiff Little Fingers
- Swirlies
- The Titanics

== See also ==
- List of record labels
