= Break the Ice (festival) =

- Genre: Hardcore punk, metalcore
- Dates: March/April/May
- Locations: Melbourne, Australia
- Years active: 2012–2014
- Founders: Oliver Cation
- Website: www.brokenhiverecords.com

Break the Ice (BTI) was a hardcore punk festival held in Melbourne, Australia in 2012, 2013, and 2014. It was run by Broken Hive Records and though short-lived, it was a significant event in the Australian hardcore calendar, attracting hundreds of punters each year.

== History ==
The festival began in 2012 as the feature date on the national tour for well-known band Trapped Under Ice. Inspiration for the fest comes from similar styled multi-day hardcore punk festivals in the USA such as This Is Hardcore and Sound and Fury. In 2013 the festival turned into a 2-day event with a more purposeful focus on other aspects of the hardcore music scene consisting of a trade market place, a bigger presence of local DIY labels, stalls selling vegan baked goods and an increased sense of community. However, the subsequent 2014 event would be the last.

=== 2012 ===
Saturday 10 March

- Trapped Under Ice
- 50 Lions
- Hopeless
- Shinto Katana
- Dropsaw
- Iron Mind
- In Trenches
- Relentless
- Phantoms
- Anchor (SWE)
- Warbrain
- Endless Heights

=== 2013 ===
Saturday 27 April

- Cold World
- Miles Away
- Iron Mind
- 50 Lions
- Phantoms
- Survival
- Endless Heights
- Vigilante
- Free World
- Reincarnation

Sunday 28 April

- Bane
- Hopeless
- Relentless
- Warbrain
- The Weight
- The Others
- Outright
- Thorns
- Civil War
- Machina Genova

Rotting Out from the US were due to play day two of the 2013 lineup but pulled out and cancelled their Australian tour set for the same period for unannounced reasons.

=== 2014 ===
Saturday 10 May

- Ringworm
- Mindsnare
- Twitching Tongues
- Iron Mind
- I Exist
- Against
- Shackles
- Colossus
- Mood Swing
- Manhunt
- Born Free

Sunday 11 May

- Misery Signals
- Foundation
- Disgrace
- Endless Heights
- Warbrain
- Blkout
- Outright
- The Others
- Starvation
- Legions
- Downside

== See also ==
- List of punk rock festivals
