= Broken Hive Records =

Australian independent record label

- Founder: Oliver Cation
- Genre: Hardcore, punk rock
- Country of origin: Australia
- Location: Sydney
- Official website: www.brokenhiverecords.com

Broken Hive Records is an Australian independent record label based in Sydney. The label caters predominantly for hardcore bands, although have released music and booked tours for bands that cross over into punk rock and metal. Broken Hive was formed by toy, who "will continue his work in hardcore music by booking international and local tours, managing and booking local bands, as well as releasing and distributing a variety of titles through the label." In 2011 the label released an extended play, Dream Strong by Sydney band Endless Heights. Since then the label has expanded to release records by many well known Australian hardcore bands, and is one of the go-to labels for fans of the hardcore genre.

Broken Hive also book shows and tours for both Australian and international bands, previous tours include Backtrack, Iron Mind, Trapped Under Ice, Xibalba, Basement, Harms Way and Endless Heights.

The label achieved wider attention with the announcement of a tour for American band Trapped Under Ice in 2012. As part of the tour the band would headline a new Melbourne based hardcore festival called Break The Ice. The festival, run by Broken Hive, has since become an integral part of the Australian hardcore calendar attracting hundreds of punters each year.

== Label roster ==
=== Current ===
- Apart From This
- Dreamtigers
- Endless Heights
- Flowermouth
- Harbourer
- Machina Genova
- Marathon
- Monuments
- Remembering Never
- Trainwreck

=== Alumni ===
- Civil War
- Phantoms
- Postblue
- Thorns

== Releases ==
Cat. #	Artist	Title	Format	Release year
BHR001	Endless Heights	Dream Strong	EP	2011
BHR002	Thorns	Thorns	EP	2012
BHR003	Phantoms	"S.O.S"	7"	2012
BHR004	Civil War	"Jaded Minds"	7"	2012
BHR005	Endless Heights	"Lady Wisdom"	7"	2012
BHR006	Machina Genova	"Weathered Heart"	10"	2013
BHR007	Trainwreck	Fresh Air / Dead Lungs	CD	2013
BHR008	Endless Heights	New Bloom	CD/LP	2013
BHR009	Remembering Never	This Hell Is Home	LP	2013
BHR010	Harbourer	"Harbourer"	7"	2014
BHR011	Dreamtigers	Wishing Well	LP	2014
BHR012	Marathon	Cure	LP	2014
BHR013	Legions	"Apparition Songs"	7"	2014
