= Mary Jane Kelly (band) =

Australian hardcore band

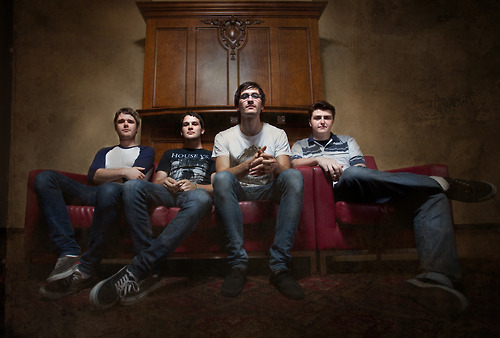

Background information
- Origin: Wollongong, New South Wales, Australia
- Genres: Hardcore
- Years active: 2006–present
- Labels: Trial and Error Records
- Members: Justin Bortignon; Matt Velozo; Jamal Salem; Steve Blomberg
- Past members: Sam Kost; Brendan Dive

Mary Jane Kelly is an Australian hardcore band out of Wollongong New South Wales that formed in 2005. The band shares its name with the last known victim of Jack The Ripper. Mary Jane Kelly have released 2 EP's the first was released in 2007 entitled Marionettes. Their second entitled Our Streets Turn White was released on 11 October 2008 through Trial and Error Records.

Mary Jane Kelly's debut album was released on 12 March 2010 entitled Like There's No Tomorrow

== Marionettes & Our Streets Turn White (2007–2010) ==
Mary Jane Kelly released their debut demo in 2007 to a positive reception. They signed a deal with Trial and Error Records. The EP entitled Our Streets Turn White was released on 11 October 2008 through Trial and Error Records to positive reviews. They were chosen as a Triple J Unearthed Next Crop featured artist in late 2008 alongside The Amity Affliction and other Australian bands. During this time they supported Bring Me the Horizon, I Killed the Prom Queen, A Wilhelm Scream, The Ghost Inside, Parkway Drive The Abandonment and various other local and international acts around Australia. Before the release of their debut album in 2010 Sam Kost left the band due to work commitments. Brendan Dive of the Sydney punk/hardcore band Rex Banner was recruited as the new bass player.

== Like There's No Tomorrow (2010–2012) ==
Mary Jane Kelly recorded their debut album in a friends garage. They released their debut album "Like There's No Tomorrow" through Trial & Error Records on 12 March 2010. In 2010 Mary Jane Kelly where chosen as a support for the annual Australian "Boy's of Summer Tour" sponsored by Macbeth. Mary Jane Kelly toured Australia with Every Time I Die as well as fellow Australian supports 50 Lions and House Vs. Hurricane. Originally American heavy metal band Trap Them were set to play, though unforeseen circumstances arose and they were unable to perform. House Vs. Hurricane were then asked to take their place.

In preparation for their debut album's release Mary Jane Kelly became supports for the upcoming "Perspectives Tour" led by House Vs. Hurricane. Other supports for the "Perspectives Tour" included Antagonist A.D. and Skyway.

== (2013–present) ==
As of late 2013 Mary Jane Kelly started playing live again. As of 2014 they are currently doing pre-production for their next full-length LP to be released in 2014 (date to be confirmed). They are also remixing and remastering their debut release for a 2014 re-release. In the meantime they are offering free downloads of their previous releases, as well as some remixed and remastered songs from 'Like There's No Tomorrow' through their band camp page: Mary Jane Kelly at Band Camp.

== Discography ==
Studio Albums

- Like There's No Tomorrow (2010, Trial and Error Records)

EPs

- Marionettes (2007)
- Our Streets Turn White (2008, Trial and Error Records)
