= Ultimatum (Australian band) =

Australian hardcore punk band

- Ultimatum at Wax Studios 1999

Background information
- Origin: Melbourne, Australia
- Genres: Hardcore punk
- Years active: 1995–2000
- Labels: Trial and Error
- Members: Lloyd Denovan; Daniel Kukiel; Emillie Reader; Tim Dywelska; Adam Nanscawen
- Past members: Michael Denovan; Billy Forde

Ultimatum were an influential hardcore punk band based in Melbourne, Australia, and formed in 1995. They were the first vegan straight edge band in Australia and appeared around the same time that Earth Crisis released Destroy the Machines. Ultimatum were one of the early Australian bands to introduce the modern 'new school' metal influenced form of hardcore to Australia. They were also recognised, not only for their vegan straight edge stance, but also for their emotional and politically charged lyrics.

In 1995 upon release of their demo, Ultimatum raised the interest and ire of people within the small punk and hardcore scene in Australia with their expressly militant lyrics and fanzine interviews.

In late 1996, after some line-up changes, Ultimatum rechartered their direction, taking a more personal and broader political focus in their lyrics. They garnered a following around Australia and in Europe with the release of their first self-titled EP in 1997, recorded by engineer Scott Harper and mastered by Martin Pullan.

Ultimatum's second split EP released on Melbourne based Trial and Error/Shock Records, with highly regarded and now defunct hardcore band Not for You was well received. This release promptly sold out and is now a rare item.

During their time, Ultimatum performed with international bands H_{2}O, Strife, Vision of Disorder, Sommerset and Australian bands 28 Days, Mindsnare, Vicious Circle and many others.

Ultimatum disbanded in 2000. Members of the band have gone on to perform in other outfits in various music genres including Meatlocker (UK), Within Blood, Hitlist, AudioWoundStabber and The Stupid Questions.

== Members ==
- Lloyd Denovan - Guitar
- Daniel Kukiel - Vocals
- Emillie Reader - Bass
- Tim Dywelska - Guitar
- Adam Nanscawen - Drums

=== Former members ===
- Michael Denovan - Drums
- Billy Forde - Vocals

== Discography ==
=== Demos and EPs ===
- Demo (1995)
- Ultimatum EP(1997) - Self Released, UP002
- Split CD with Not for You (2000) - Shock Records, Trial and Error

=== Compilations ===
- New Tools for the Hunter (1997) - First Blood Records
- Mother Earth (1997) - Impression Recordings
- Bastard Squad (1997) - Bastard Squad Fanzine
- Underground Surf (1998) - Phantom Records, Mushroom Records, Underground Surf Magazine
- Falsestart Vol. 1 (1998) - Falsestart Magazine
- The Good Life (1999) - Good Life Records, Trial and Error
- Punk You (2000) - Shock Records
- True 'til Death Vol. 2 (2005) - Snapshot Records
