= Like There's No Tomorrow =

Studio album by Mary Jane Kelly
- Released: March 12, 2010
- Genre: Hardcore
- Length: 29:38
- Label: Trial and Error Records
- Producer: Murray Adams

Mary Jane Kelly chronology
Our Streets Turn White (2008)	Like There's No Tomorrow (2010)

Professional ratings
Review scores
Source	Rating
Kill Your Stereo	(4.75/5)

Like There's No Tomorrow is the debut studio album by Australian hardcore band Mary Jane Kelly. It was released in March 2010.

== Track listing ==
1. "Intro" – 1:32
2. "Pigs Of Gluttony" – 2:59
3. "Wallflowers" – 3:02
4. "Hell In Gold Leaf Palaces" – 2:36
5. "The Imprecision Of My Dimensions" – 3:23
6. "Broken Hips, Burnt Cigars" – 2:43
7. "With A Bang To Mute Our Whimpers" – 2:27
8. "Filthy Lucre" – 2:22
9. "If God Were Here..." – 2:33
10. "Weak, Corrupt, Worthless & Restless" – 2:42
11. "It's Just The Abyss" – 3:21

== Credits ==
- Justin Bortignon – Vocals
- Matt Velozo – Guitar
- Jamal Salem – Drums
- Brendan Dive – Bass Guitar
- Murray Adamson – Producer
