= Italian hardcore =

The Italian hardcore punk scene was active throughout the 1980s.

== History ==
Italian hardcore as a genre was extremely influential throughout the 1980s, and still is for many hardcore bands across the world. Although there were important scenes in the USA and the UK, in the 1980s Italy punks grew up in a difficult social and political situation, once the era of political terrorism (both left and right wing) ended up and the moment was ready for mass-firing in Italian factories.

Many punks of that years came directly from the Italian working and underclass, so the lyrics of the bands were focused on the social situation and on the distance between punk movement and the growing Italian-yuppie philosophy.

Inspired by bands such as Crass and Discharge, many lyrics were anti-war and NATO.

== List of Italian hardcore bands ==
- Cripple Bastards
- Negazione
- Raw Power
- Skruigners
- Wretched
- CCCP Fedeli alla Linea
