= Lucre =

Lucre usually refers to one of many slang terms for money. It may also refer to:

- Lucre, a hill in the novel The Pilgrim's Progress by John Bunyan
- Lucre (EP), by Dean Blunt, Elias Rønnenfelt, and Vegyn (2025)
- Lucre District, Quispicanchi, a district in Peru
- Lucre Island, a fictional island in the Monkey Island video-game series

== See also ==
- Filthy Lucre (disambiguation)
- Luker (disambiguation)
