= Toe to Toe =

Australian hardcore band

- Origin: Sydney, New South Wales, Australia
- Genres: Hardcore punk Soul
- Years active: 1992—
- Labels: Old School Cartel, Trial & Error Records, Resist Records

Toe to Toe is an Australian hardcore band from Sydney, New South Wales, Australia. The band was most prominent in the Australian hardcore scene during the 1990s, touring and recording less frequently by the 2000s. It have been described as "one of the best hardcore outfits ever to grace the planet" by Punknews.org.

== Influence and style ==
Toe to Toe's stated aim is "to reintroduce the sounds and ethics of 80's hardcore punk", having been influenced by the emergence of the Washington, D.C. hardcore band Bad Brains, Portland hardcore band Poison Idea and later, New York hardcore bands such as Agnostic Front and Sick of it All. It has tried to distance itself from the metal and pop aspects of punk. The band's name itself, including much of its lyrical content and album artwork, reference boxing terms to match the aggressive musical style.

== History ==
Toe to Toe formed in 1992 by vocalist and Resist Records founder, Scotty Mac, who remains the band's only original member. Described by Missing Link Records as the "mainstays of the Sydney hardcore scene", the band has seen numerous line-up changes, released several recordings and have possibly been one of the only Australian hardcore acts to have received mainstream acknowledgment in the country, playing festivals such as Livid, Homebake and the Vans Warped Tours. It have also done national tours of Japan, Europe and America and have played with internationally renowned hardcore acts such as Agnostic Front, the Dropkick Murphys, and Madball. Political artist and activist, Azlan McLennan, described the band as superior to its US influences, citing Scott Mac's stance against racism.

== Members ==
As of 2025, the band's line-up consists of:

- Vocals: Scott Mac
- Lead guitar: Simon Tattam
- Rhythm guitar: Shane Fensom
- Bass: Jay Blurter
- Drums: Ben Muckenshnabl

2016

- Vocals: Scott Mac
- Guitars: Nick Rakebrandt
- Guitars: Matt Campbell
- Drums: Ant Deitz
- Bass: Adam Check

2004-tba

- Bass: Matty Albert

2001-2004:

- Vocals: Scott Mac
- Lead guitar: Pete Bursky
- Rhythm guitar: Will Webber
- Bass: Neil 'Beans' Ryan
- Drums: Ben 'Mook' Muckenshnabl

2000-2001:

- Vocals: Scott Mac
- Guitar: Will Webber
- Bass: Neil 'Beans' Ryan
- Drums: Matt 'Spider' Lodge (deceased)

== Discography ==
Release date	Title	Label	Format
1992	Slap of Reality	Punch Drunk Productions	EP
1993	Unanimous Points Decision	Punch Drunk Productions	EP
1993	Circlestorm	Custom Recordings	Compilation
1993	Election Night 93: Straight Off the Desk	Heinous Fuck Records	Live
1995	Force	Kangaroo	EP
1995	Fuck Seattle This is Sydney	Kangaroo	Compilation
1995	Threats and Facts	Spent Records	LP
1995	Southpaw	Beer City Records	EP
1996	No Gods	Spent Records	EP
1996	Kings (with Mindsnare)	Spent Records	Split
1996	The Best Defence Is Attack	Custom Recordings	Discography
1997	Tao	Custom Recordings	LP
1999	Consolidated	Custom Recordings	LP
1999	"Slave"	No Deal Records	Single
2001	Fighting Pride	Snaphot Records	Live
2003	Old Scores, New Glories	Sold Our Souls Records	EP
2008	Toe to Toe/Tenth Dan	Trial & Error Records	Split
2010	Arturo Gatti	Resist Records	LP
2013	Still Fighting	Old School Cartel	EP Featuring Lou Koeller, Craig Setari, Freddy Cricien

== See also ==
- Resist Records
- Trial & Error Records
