= Our Streets Turn White =

EP by Mary Jane kelly
- Released: 2008
- Genre: Hardcore
- Length: 16:57

Mary Jane kelly chronology
Marionettes (2006)	Our Streets Turn White (2008)	Like There's No Tomorrow (2010)

Professional ratings
Review scores
Source	Rating
Kill Your Stereo	4.5/5 stars

Our Streets Turn White is the second EP released by Australian Hardcore band Mary Jane Kelly. The album was released in 2008 featuring a remake of "Worthwhile Overdose" heard on their previous album Marionettes.

== Track listing ==
1. "Intro" – 0:58
2. "Sinking Ships To Burning Cars" – 3:34
3. "Folding Seas And Lonely Deaths" – 3:17
4. "Worthwhile Overdose" – 3:01
5. "Our Streets Turn White" – 2:53
6. "I Stabbed God In The Back" – 3:16

== Credits ==
- Justin Bortignon – vocals (2006–present)
- Matt Velozo – guitar (2006–present)
- Jamal Salem – drums (2006–present)
- Sam Kost – bass (2009–present)
- Shane Edwards – Producer
