= Filthy Lucre =

Filthy Lucre is a slang term for money, "filthy" implying it was illegally or corruptly obtained. It may also refer to:

== Books ==
- Filthy Lucre: Economics for People Who Hate Capitalism, 2009 book by Joseph Heath
- Filthy Lucre (novel), a novel by English author Beryl Bainbridge

== Music ==
- "Filthy Lucre", a track on the 2010 album Like There's No Tomorrow by Australian band Mary Jane Kelly
- Filthy Lucre (band), a band formed by British musician Steve Dior in 1993
- Filthy Lucre Live, an album by British punk rock band the Sex Pistols
  - Filthy Lucre Tour, 1996 reunion tour of the Sex Pistols
- Filthy Lucre (music producer), an Australian music production and remixing outfit headed by Gavin Campbell
- "Filthy Lucre", a track on the 2026 album Hope by Christian Rock band Petra

== Other ==
- Filthy Lucre, a 2014 art project by U.S. artist Darren Waterston
- "Filthy Lucre" (Californication), an episode of the television series Californication

== See also ==
- Lucre (disambiguation)
