= Embodiment 12:14 =

Australian Christian metal band

- Also known as: Embodiment (1992-1997)
- Origin: Adelaide, Australia
- Genres: Christian metal, death metal, hardcore punk, metalcore
- Years active: 1992-2006
- Labels: Rowe, Trial & Error, 618

Embodiment 12:14 were an Australia Christian metal band formed in Adelaide, as Embodiment in 1992, initially performing death metal. They released two albums, Elements of This Man-Made Man (1998) and Inroads Out (2005), before disbanding in 2006.

== History ==
Drummer Aaron Harslett, guitarists Luke Martin and Ben Reid, and singer Darren Reid formed Embodiment 12:14 in Adelaide in 1992, as Embodiment. They played death metal and contributed tracks to three compilation albums by various artists. In 1997, they tweaked their name to become Embodiment 12:14 due to an American band of similar name, Embodyment. The "12:14" is a reference to "a couple of verse’s taken from Phillipians 3 12-14."

They supported metal and hardcore acts such as Agnostic Front, Madball, Mindsnare, Vision of Disorder, Anthrax, Fear Factory, Soulfly, Norma Jean, 59 Times the Pain, Soilwork, Inflames, As I Lay Dying, Atreyu, Good Clean Fun, Killswitch Engage and Chimaira. Embodiment 12:14 released the album Elements of This Man-Made Man in 1998 via Trial & Error Records. The band has influenced metal and hardcore bands, for example Shai Hulud. In 2002, Trial & Error issued a split extended play with three tracks by Embodiment 12:14, "The Bridge Is Out", "Penknife" and "Coming of Age", and another four tracks by label mates Not for You. Owen McGregor-Hart of Oz Music Project observed, "[they] give us 3 sharp tracks of emotion filled hardcore... [and] show us their true colours. Combining raw guitars, both screaming and melodic vocals and a strong rhythm section, you're left wish a sweet, sweet taste in your mouth from this release."

The line-up of singer Darren Reid, drummer Harslett, guitarist Michael Wright, guitarist/vocalist Kyle Bloksgaard, bassist Greg Smith, keyboardist/vocalist/programmer Rodger Smith, and rhythm guitarist/vocal harmonizer Tim Lawrence recorded and released the group's second album, Inroads Out, in 2003. It was recorded at Soundhouse Studio by Anj and produced by the group with Anj. Tracks received "consistent rotation" on Triple J, national youth radio.

Aidan Quinn of Punk Hardcore felt that with the album, "these dudes still have it, a lot more melodic-metal that basically could be summed up as Shai Hulud cross Inflames. Nice vocals, both melodic and heavy... amazing new guitar work, the addition of keys and solid drumming with heaps of stand out fills, make sure you check these guys out as they are the shit for melodic metalcore[...] with a huge focus on melody, technicality and a strong christian influence."

== Members ==
- Aaron Harslett – drums (1992–2003)
- Luke Martin – guitar (1992–1995)
- Ben Reid – guitar (1992–98, 2003)
- Darren Reid – vocals (1992–2003, 2010)
- Chris Duggan – bass guitar (1994–95)
- Kane Jones – bass guitar (1995–98)
- Mike Wright – guitar, clean vocals (1995–2003)
- Tim Lawrence – guitar (1998–2003)
- Greg Smith – bass guitar (1998–2003)
- Kyle Bloksgaard – guitar, vocals (2003)
- Roger Smith – keys, programming, vocals (2003)
- Kelvin Sugars – drums (2010)
- Dave McGuire – guitar, vocals

== Discography ==
Compilation appearances

- Australian Metal Compilation I - Godspeed (Rowe; 1994)
- Australian Metal Compilation II - The Raise the Dead (Rowe; 1995)
- Australian Metal Compilation IV - Falling on Deaf Ears (Rowe; 1996)
- While the City Sleeps Compilation (2001; 618 Records)

Studio albums

- Elements of This Man-Made Man (1998) – Trial & Error Records
- Inroads Out (2003) – Trial & Error Records (Trial033CD)

Split extended plays

- "The Bridge Is Out", "Penknife" and "Coming of Age" on Embodiment 12:14/Not for You Split EP (four tracks by Not for You) (2002) – Trial & Error Records
