= Against (Australian band) =

Australian hardcore punk band

- Origin: Brisbane, Queensland, Australia
- Genre: Hardcore punk
- Years active: 2001–present
- Label: Trial & Error Records
- Members: Greg Appleby; Chris Dumble; Chris Hill; Ash McIntyre; Michael Elmes
- Past members: Andrew Barber, Brett Kearney, Steve Blackaby
- Website: Official Against MySpace

Against is an Australian hardcore punk band from Brisbane, Australia.

== History ==
Vocalist Greg first formed the group in September 2001, with the intention of having fun with some friends and playing hardcore music with heart and a message.

After signing with Common Bond Records, Against recorded and released their second EP, entitled My Hate My Choice, which has now sold over 2000 copies to date. The band has toured Australia with acts such as Mindsnare and Champion, as well as AFI, Terror, Madball, Cro-Mags, Boysetsfire and Silence The Epilogue, which has allowed them to "road-test" their sound.

With Against's first album entitled Left For Dead, released on Melbourne-based Trial & Error Records in November 2006, the band have taken their sound to the next level. Against's second studio release, Loyalty and Betrayal, was released on 20 August 2007.

== Current Lineup ==
- Greg Appleby – Vocals
- Ash McIntyre – Guitar
- Michael Elmes – Guitar
- Chris Hill – Bass
- Christopher Dumble – Drums

== Former members ==
- Chris Buttery – Guitar (Pre Demo)
- Bojan Sambolec – Drums (Demo, My Hate, My Choice)
- Mike Sambolec – Bass (Demo, My Hate, My Choice)
- Nathan Scutts – Drums (Demo, My Hate, My Choice)
- Sean Cash – Bass
- Dean Allthorpe – Bass (My Hate My Choice)
- Tyrone Ross – Bass (My Hate My Choice)
- Chris Dusting – Guitar (Demo, My Hate My Choice)
- Dave Banning – Guitar (Left for Dead)
- Vinnie Steel – Guitar (My Hate My Choice, Left for Dead)
- Brett Kearney – Drums (My Hate My Choice, Left for Dead, Loyalty & Betrayal)
- Steve Blackaby – Bass (Loyalty & Betrayal)
- Andrew Barber – Guitar (Left for Dead, Loyalty & Betrayal)

== Discography ==
- 2002 — Won't Be Your Fall Demo CD
- 2004 — My Hate My Choice CD
- 2005 — Left For Dead CD
- 2007 — Loyalty and Betrayal CD
- 2013 — Bring The End - LP

== See also ==
- Trial & Error Records
