= We Are the Dead (album) =

Studio album by Antagonist A.D.
- Released: 2008
- Genre: Metalcore
- Label: Trial & Error

Antagonist A.D. chronology
Distance (2007)	We Are the Dead (2008)

We Are the Dead is Antagonist A.D.'s second full-length album. The title is drawn from a line in the World War I poem "In Flanders Fields".

Before the release of this album they changed their name from Antagonist to Antagonist A.D. to reduce confusion between them and the American metalcore band, Antagonist.

== Track listing ==
No.	Title	Length
1.	"Twelve Twenty Two"	2:11
2.	"Wolves & Cowards"	2:02
3.	"No Regrets?"	1:36
4.	"The Golden Years"	2:06
5.	"This Gun"	2:29
6.	"Bleached"	2:38
7.	"The Twilight Years"	2:46
8.	"We Are the Dead"	2:01
9.	"Celebrity"	2:09
10.	"Misery"	2:03
