= Wretched =

Wretched may refer to:

- Wretched (punk band)
- Wretched (doom metal band)
- Wretched (death metal band)
- The Wretched (film), a 2020 supernatural horror film by the Pierce Brothers
- "The Wretched", a song by The Word Alive from their album, Deceiver
- "The Wretched", a song by Attack Attack! from their album, This Means War
- The Wretched, an English translation of Les Misérables
- "The Wretched", a song by Nine Inch Nails from their album, The Fragile
- Wretched and Divine: The Story of the Wild Ones, Black Veil Brides' third studio album
