= Negazione =

Italian band

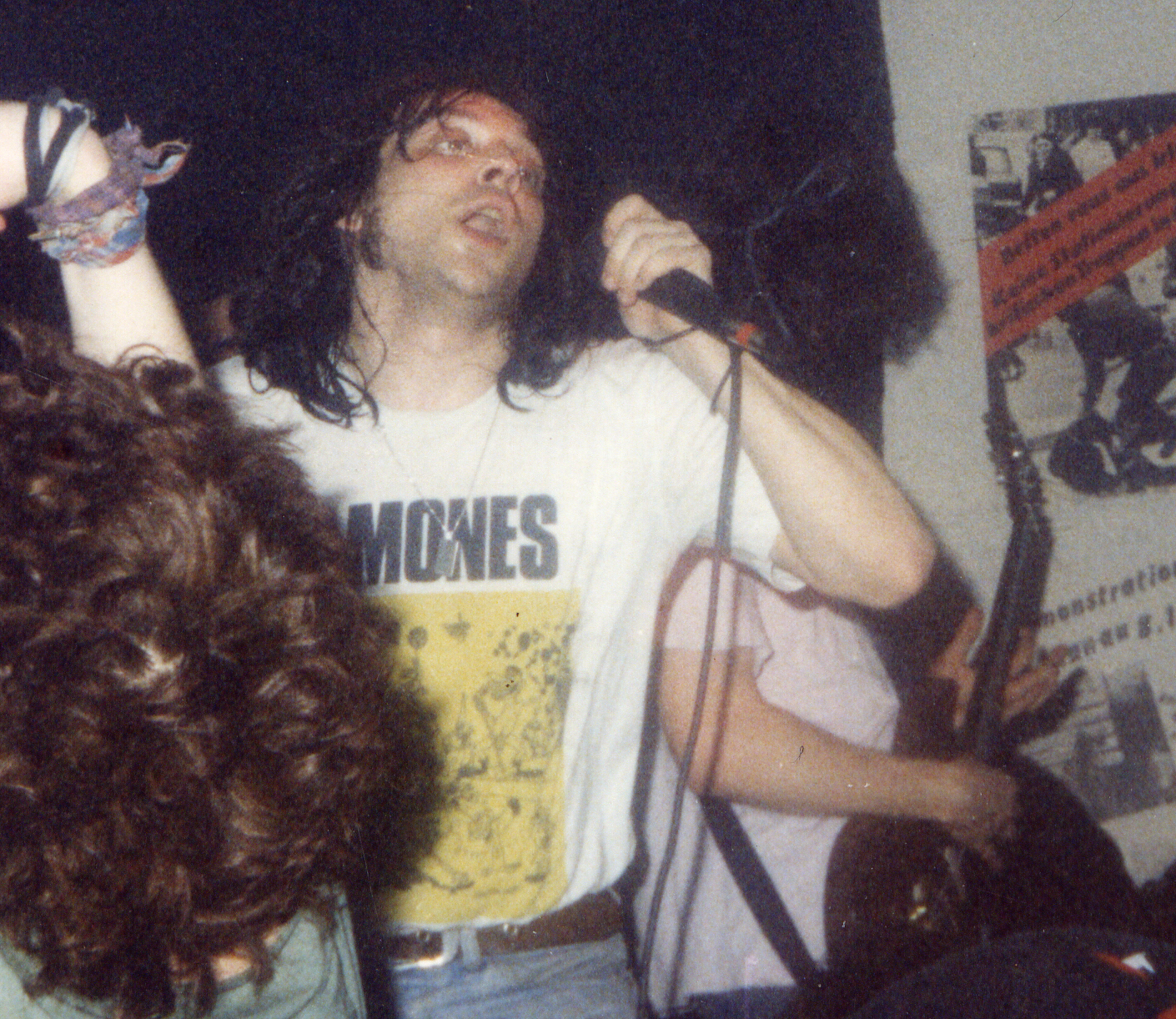
- Negazione live in Germany, 1988

Background information
- Origin: Turin, Italy
- Genres: Hardcore punk, punk rock
- Years active: 1983–1992
- Labels: Konkurrel, Mordam Records, T.V.O.R., New Beginning Records, We Bite Records
- Past members: Guido Sassola - vocals (1983–1992); Roberto Farano - guitar (1983–1992); Marco Mathieu - bass (1983–1992); Several drummers (see Band Members)
- Website: Negazione.com

Negazione was a hardcore punk band based in Turin, Italy during the 1980s and early 1990s.

Formed in 1983, they were one of the most important bands of the hardcore punk scene in Italy at the time. They were one of the early bands of the Italian hardcore punk scene, like Raw Power and Wretched.

The band broke up in 1992, their last show being at that year's Monsters of Rock festival.

Bass guitarist Marco Mathieu died on 24 December 2021, at the age of 57. He was in a coma since 2017 after suffering a stroke.

== Band members ==
The main members of the band were:

- Guido Sassola, "Zazzo" – vocals
- Roberto Farano, "Tax" – guitar
- Marco Mathieu (1964 – 24 December 2021) – bass guitar

In the course of the band's existence there were many changes in drummers. In chronological order they were:

- Orlando Furioso
- Michele D'Alessio
- Roberto Vernetti – drum machine
- Fabrizio Fiegl (died 18 July 2011)
- Rowdy James
- Stefano Bonanni, "Bone"
- Elvin Betty
- Giovanni Pellino, "Jeff", now known as "Neffa", funky-pop singer
- Massimo Ferrusi

== Discography ==
=== Studio albums ===
- Mucchio selvaggio (1984) (split cassette with Declino)
- Lo spirito continua... (1986)
- Little Dreamer (1988)
- 100% (1990)

=== EPs ===
- Tutti pazzi (1985)
- Condannati a morte nel vostro quieto vivere (1985)
- ...nightmare (1987)
- Behind the Door (1989)
- Sempre in bilico (1989)

=== Compilation albums ===
- Wild Bunch: The Early Days (1989)
- TuttiPazzi: Negazione 1983-1992 (2002)
- Il giorno del sole (2012)
- La Nostra Vita (2017)

=== Singles ===
- Sempre in bilico (1989)
