= These Cities, Our Graves =

Studio album by Antagonist A.D
- Released: 7 August 2006
- Genre: Metalcore
- Length: 24:34
- Label: Elevenfiftyseven Records

Antagonist A.D chronology
| These Cities, Our Graves (2006) | Distance (2007) |

Alternative Cover
- These Cities, Our Graves 2008 (re-release cover)

These Cities, Our Graves is the first full-length album released by the New Zealand metalcore band Antagonist A.D. It was released in August 2006. In 2008 the album was re-released in Australia on Trial & Error Records, featuring two more songs, "Distance" and "Stranger", which are both on the 2007 Distance EP.

== Track listing ==
2006 release

1. "These Cities, Our Graves" - "1:12"
2. "The Walking Dead" - "2:53"
3. "Hollywood" - "3:14"
4. "Show Some Heart (Go Vegan)" - "2:46"
5. "R.E.S.P.E.C.T" - "3:05"
6. "The Birth of Tragedy" - "2:49"
7. "(Not Even) Silver Bullets" - "2:44"
8. "Suicide Girls" - "2:34"
9. "Q. What Do You Call Getting A Handjob From Mrs Calloway In The Back Of Her Jaguar? A. A Fucking Lie" - "3:18"

2008 re-release

10. "Distance" - "2:46"
11. "Stranger" - "2:27"
