= Trial & Error Records =

- Type: Independent
- Industry: Music
- Genre: Hardcore/Punk
- Founded: 1997
- Headquarters: Melbourne, Victoria, Australia
- Owner: Nigel Melder
- Website: Official Website; Official MySpace

Trial & Error Records is an independent record label based in Melbourne, Victoria. It is one of Australia's largest hardcore labels. The label is owned and run by Mindsnare bassist, Nigel Melder. As of 2019 Trial and Error are no longer releasing music.

== Current artists ==
- 4dead
- Against
- Antagonist A.D
- Bulldog Spirit
- Dead Kings
- Dropsaw
- Extortion
- From The Ruins
- Fuck It I Quit
- Hopeless
- In Name and Blood
- Jungle Fever
- Life in Pictures
- Lookin' In
- Mary Jane Kelly
- Meatlocker
- Mindsnare
- S W \V Z D (Sex Wizard)
- The Nation Blue
- Pet Meat
- Samsara
- The Seduction
- Tenth Dan
- Stretch Arm Strong

== Former bands ==
- Charter 77
- Toe To Toe
- Through His Blood
- Ultimatum
- Day of Contempt
- Shotpointblank
- Embodiment 12:14

== See also ==
- List of record labels
- Australian hardcore
