= Antagonist A.D. =

New Zealand metalcore band

- Origin: Auckland, New Zealand
- Genres: Metalcore; Hardcore
- Years active: 2005–present
- Labels: Greyscale Records, UNFD, Trial & Error, Elevenfiftyseven, Mediaskare
- Members: Sam Crocker; Matt Livingstone; Luke Manson; Jai Morrow; Kevin Cameron
- Past members: Sean O'Kane Connelly; Brendan Wishnowsky; Ross McDougall; Kris 'Boozey' Bosman; Milon William; Israel McDean; Joshua Moffitt
- Website: www.antagonistad.net

Antagonist A.D. are a metalcore band from Auckland, New Zealand, formed in 2005.

== History ==
=== Formation and S/T Demo (2005) ===
Antagonist A.D was formed in 2005 by vocalist Sam Crocker and bassist Joshua Moffitt as just Antagonist. They were inspired by fast American hardcore bands such as Martyr A.D. and Until the End as well as European bands Arkangel and Maroon. They took the name from Maroon's debut album. The original line-up also comprised drummer Brendon Wishnowsky and Sean Connolly. The band recorded a four-song demo with Ulcerate's Jamie Saint Merat. Some releases following the main pressing featured a fifth song, "Some Glory".

=== These Cities, Our Graves (2005–2008) ===
At the end of 2005, Connolly and Wihsnowsky left, and guitarists Kris Bosman and Ross Mcdougall and drummer Israel Mcdean joined.

The band's debut full-length record These Cities, Our Graves was recorded in early 2006 by Avalanche City frontman David Baxter, then guitarist in metalcore band One Must Fall, and released on 1157 Records. The band's lyrics focused on animals and respecting women.

Around this time the band toured Australia for the first time, with the help of Washed Up Records owner Tommy Dollars, playing in Victoria and South Australia with local bands Stronghold, Her Nightmare, and The Red Shore, as well as dates in Queensland supporting US hardcore band Most Precious Blood. Shortly later, the band was signed by Melbourne-based Trial & Error Records. An Australian version of These Cities, Our Graves was released through Trial & Error Records in 2008, featuring two new tracks, "Distance" and "Stranger".

The band then went on a national tour of Australia with Parkway Drive, Have Heart and Break Even in support of the release. After the tour the band continued playing throughout New Zealand and Australia for the next year.

=== We Are the Dead (2008–2010) ===
Antagonist A.D. released their second studio album in Australia and New Zealand in October 2008, recorded at various studios around Auckland and Hamilton, and mixed and mastered by Zack Ohren.

To facilitate international tours, We Are the Dead was released under the name Antagonist A.D., adding the suffix to avoid confusion with the American band Antagonist. The band played New Zealand's biggest music festival, the Big Day Out.

In 2009, the band went on a headline tour through The Philippines, Singapore, Thailand, Malaysia, Indonesia, and Japan. They returned in mid-2009 to tour Australia with Earth Crisis and Day of Contempt. Shortly after the tour, towards the end of 2009, the band fired guitarist Ross McDougall, who is now in Saving Grace.

In August 2010 they played their first shows in Europe with Australia's 50 Lions and Canadian band Gravemaker, returning to New Zealand in mid-September to tour with Parkway Drive on their Deep Blue album release tour alongside The Devil Wears Prada and The Ghost Inside.

=== Old Bones Make New Blooms (2010) ===
Old Bones Make New Blooms was recorded in 2010 at Red Dog Studios by Nate Sowter. Following a series of delays from record label Trial & Error the five song 7" was released in February 2011. Between the recording and release of the 7", Matthew Livingstone joined the band as a guitarist.

Founding member and bassist Joshua Moffitt left the band in July 2010 to move to Japan to work as a scientist.

=== Nothing from No One and Haunt Me as I Roam (2012–2015) ===
In 2012 Antagonist A.D. joined the Mediaskare label and Nothing from No One was the first release. The album was recorded in 2012 by Nate Sowter. Drums were tracked at the Porch Studio in Hamilton and guitars and vocals tracked at Red Dog Studios in Mount Maunganui. The album was mixed and mastered by Zach Ohren and released on Mediaskare Records. The album was released July 2012 and was followed in August by an album release tour of New Zealand and Australia.

In 2013 the band started a world tour including New Zealand, the United States, Australia, and Europe. The band were accompanied by labelmates Murder Death Kill on the US leg. The Australian leg was in support of The Ghost Inside and alongside Emmure and Hand of Mercy. The European leg was a collaboration of tours with friends Parkway Drive and Deez Nuts. After a year of touring, the band started working on a new full-length album, which resulted in the release of Haunt Me as I Roam in 2015.

=== Through Fire All Things Are Renewed (2020-2022) ===
The album Through Fire All Things Are Renewed was recorded by Kurt Ballou at GodCity in Salem MA and was released as a three part 7" vinyl EP series via Greyscale Records from 2020 to 2022, and finally as a 12" vinyl LP and CD on 3 June 2022. It includes the singles No Justice, A.P.M.D., Gates of Hell, The System as Racist and Oppressive, Through Fire, and Angels at Your Feet, Devils in Your Head. The release was followed by an album release tour of New Zealand and Australia in July 2022.

== Lyrical themes ==
Antagonist A.D. are known for their outspoken views on socio-political issues such as racism and sexism. Animal rights issues feature heavily in the band's lyrics, and all members are vegans and vegetarians. The band are vocal supporters of Sea Shepherd.

== Members ==
Current members

- Sam Crocker – vocals (2005–present)
- Matt Livingstone – guitar (2010–present)
- Luke Manson – guitar (2012–2018); bass (2018–present)
- Jai Morrow – drums (2018–present)
- Kevin Cameron - guitar (2018–present)

Former members

- Sean O'Kane Connelly – guitar (2005)
- Brendon Wishnowsky – drums (2005)
- Ross McDougall – guitar (2005–2010)
- Kris "Boozey" Bosman – guitar (2005–2013)
- Milon William – bass (2012–2013)
- Joshua Moffitt – bass (2005–2010, 2014–2018)
- Israel McDean – drums (2005–2018)

Timeline

== Discography ==
Year	Title	Label
2006	These Cities, Our Graves	Elevenfiftyseven Records
2007	Distance	Elevenfiftyseven Records
2008	We Are the Dead	Trial & Error Records
2011	Old Bones Make New Blooms	Trial & Error Records
2012	Nothing from No One	Mediaskare Records
2015	Haunt Me as I Roam	UNFD
2020	Through Fire	Greyscale Records
2021	All Things	Greyscale Records
2022	Are Renewed	Greyscale Records
