= Luker =

Luker (from lucre) is idiomatic Australian English for "money".

Luker may also refer to the following people:

== Given name ==
- Luker Kentfield (born 2005), Australian rules footballer playing for the Melbourne Football Club

== Surname ==
- Archibald Leonard Luker (1918–1971), composer of the Guyanan national anthem "Dear Land of Guyana, of Rivers and Plains"
- James Luker (born 1942), American politician and lawyer
- Joseph Luker (c. 1765–1803), first police officer to be killed on active duty in Australia
- Kristin Luker (born 1946), Professor of Sociology at the University of California
- Kelan Luker (born 1980), American footballer and coach; bassist and musician for Submersed
- Rebecca Luker (1961–2020), American singer, Broadway actress, and musician
