= Iron Mind =

Australian hardcore punk band

- Origin: Melbourne, Australia
- Genres: Hardcore punk
- Years active: 2006–present
- Labels: Suppression Records, Life.Lair.Regret. Records, Resist Records

Iron Mind are a hardcore punk band from Melbourne, Australia that began in 2006, originally under the name of 'Hold Up'. The band takes influence from the NYHC sound and are notable for being one of the most popular bands of the hardcore genre in Australia. The band is currently signed to Resist Records.

== History ==
Iron Mind toured Australia in 2012 in support of their album, Hell Split Open, alongside Backtrack and Terror. They followed with shows in New Zealand in October.

Their second album, Iron Mind, was produced by Mike Deslandes (Blkout, Robotosaurus, Coerce) in the Dandenong Ranges; it was released in mid-January 2014 via Resist Records. Mark Hebblewhite of The Music felt "this is very angry music. Each of the album's ten tracks seethes with an unrelenting rage channeled into an epic avalanche of molten mid-tempo riffage... [they] have probably dropped the hardcore album of 2014." The album reached No. 15 on the ARIA Hitseekers – Albums Chart.

== Discography ==
=== Studio Releases ===
Year	Album	Label
2009	The Sun Has Set EP	Suppression Records
2011	Guilt Demo Tape (Hell Split Wide Open Promo)	Dead Souls Records
2011	Hell Split Wide Open LP	Dead Souls Records
2013	Divide/Praise Tape (Self Titled Promo)	Life.Lair.Regret. Records
2014	Iron Mind	Resist Records
2025	Test Of The Iron Mind	Last Ride Records

=== Releases as 'Hold Up' ===
Year	Album	Label
2007	Demo	Self Release

== Members ==
=== Current ===
- Sam Octigan - Vocals
- Neil Bloem - Guitar
- Akira Asahina - Guitar
- Daniel Collins - Bass
- Josh Barclay - Drums

=== Former ===
- David Gatica - Guitar
- Daniel "Tbone" Peters - Guitar
- Jack Sparrow - Bass
- Brenton Lee - Bass
