= Mindsnare =

Australian hardcore punk band

- Origin: Melbourne, Victoria, Australia
- Genres: Hardcore punk Metalcore
- Years active: 1993–present
- Labels: Trial & Error, Resist, Goodlife Recordings
- Members: Matt Maunder; Nigel Melder; Beltsy; Gordy Forman
- Past members: Bomber, Brad
- Website: www.myspace.com/mindsnarehc

Mindsnare are an Australian hardcore band from Melbourne, Victoria. Formed in 1993 under the name Mad Circle, their music is a blend of traditional "old school" hardcore punk and crossover metal, and as such has seen them play alongside metal bands like Kreator and Ringworm, as well as more straightforward hardcore acts like Agnostic Front, Sick of it All and Australia's Toe To Toe. In its genre, Mindsnare have been described as "one of the most influential bands of the past decade " by Missing Link Records.

== Discography ==
- 1995: Under Fire LP
- 1996: Credulity LP
- 1996: Split with Toe To Toe EP
- 1997: White EP EP
- 1998: Under Fire (93-96) LP
- 1999: Split with Congress CD
- 2001: Downside Eastside CD/EP
- 2004: 1997-1999: The Bootleg CD
- 2004: Hanged, Choked, Wrists Slit CD
- 2004: The Death CD/LP
- 2006: Gasman 7"
- 2007: Disturb the Hive CD/LP
- 2011: Split with Ringworm EP
- 2017: Unholy Rush CD/LP

== See also ==
- Trial & Error Records
