= Australian hardcore =

Music genre

Australian hardcore punk bands tend to have local fan bases, although a number have toured Australia and internationally. Prominent bands from the scene that have been recognised by the mainstream have included Toe to Toe, Massappeal and Mindsnare, while many relative newcomers (such as Ill Brigade, Miles Away, Break Even, 50 Lions, Speed Relentless and Iron Mind to name a few examples) have enjoyed some commercial success due to the recent popularity of the genre. Many of these bands are currently very popular and are bringing some mainstream attention to the label "hardcore", Australian hardcore is played on the national Triple J network in the short.fast.loud program and on a number of local stations.

== Early history (late 1970s–early 1980s) ==
Brisbane was at the forefront of the hardcore punk scene in the late 70s with bands emerging such as Young Identities, Public Execution, Razar, Mystery of Sixes and The Leftovers. Sydney had a strong following of hardcore punk bands in the early 1980s such as Vigil Anti, Massappeal, Hard-Ons and Johnny Dole & The Scabs. Depression and Vicious Circle from Melbourne were two of the most popular hardcore bands in Australia, which formed in 1982 and 1983, respectively. Depression released 3 LP's, 3 singles & 1 EP before disbanding in 1989. Where's the Pope? from Adelaide was another popular hardcore band forming in 1985 and releasing their first LP "Straight Edge Holocaust" in 1987. Adelaide was also home to early hardcore punk band The Skunks who formed in 1979 and released their first EP in 1982. Rupture from Perth was another popular band forming in the mid-1980s. Canberra was home to The Vacant Lot a band who formed in 1978 and played quite a few gigs around the nations capital until they disbanded in August 1980. The Vacant Lot released one EP in 1980.

== Culture ==
=== Ideology ===
Winston McCall of Parkway Drive commented in an interview about straight edge and veganism:

Veganism and straight edge beliefs are becoming more prominent in the hardcore scene, and in Adelaide in particular, according to McCall. "I'd say Adelaide has probably got the biggest straight edge/vegan scene in Australia. In Byron there's about five straight edge kids and I think maybe two kids that are vegan and that's about it," McCall laughs. "I'm vegetarian myself and there's a couple of us that are straight edge, but we just wanna have fun and play music. We do believe in trying to make a difference in some way, but as a whole we don't really champion any beliefs. We're just a hardcore band!"

=== Radio shows ===
The ABC Triple J network has a weekly program, short.fast.loud, which showcases some punk and hardcore music released both locally and elsewhere. The show focuses on a range of music, from radio-friendly acts such as Go It Alone, Stolen Youth and Miles Away, to smaller, more obscure act such as Hospital The Musical, Bad Day Down, Robotosaurus, This City Sunrise and R.A.D.

== See also ==
- Music of Australia
