= Wretched (punk band) =

Wretched was a hardcore punk band from Milan, Italy. Along with other bands such as Indigesti, they formed the basis of the hardcore scene in Italy during the 1980s. Their music was usually fast-paced with violent and dark lyrics. It was fronted by Gianmario and Fabietto Mussi.

== Biography ==
From Kill From The Heart:

Wretched hailed from Milan, Italy circa 1980. The original line-up was Gigi on guitar, Fabio on bass, Giancarlo on drums, and Gianmario singing. This version of Wretched debuted on their 1982 split EP with Indigesti. Although they originally sang in English, they soon switched to their native Italian, finding it better suited to expressing their radical political message. The band took strong anti-war and pro-anarchist stands through their lyrics and imagery. They also self-released all of their records on a label that came to be known as Chaos Productions. The band lived at the infamous Milano squat Virus, which played host to many hardcore shows in the early-mid '80's. Wretched lived and breathed the DIY spirit of rebellion that they advocated in their music.

The band recorded their first EP before switching guitar players and drummers in 1984. Daniele (guitar) and Crema (drums) played on the next record, Finira Mai?, and on the full length. Appearances on BCT tapes comps and the seminal international compilation P.E.A.C.E. spread the word of "Chaos non musica" to everywhere punk was being played. Zambo took over drums in 1985, and the band began its shift into more heavy metal territory. They recorded one more LP and a 7" before internal problems (including Mario's shredded vocal cords) and line-up changes forced them to call it quits. Before melting down, they played the last show at Virus with Antisect. Unfortunately, Wretched's strong commitment to doing it themselves meant that their records have always been hard to get outside of Italy. An official CD discography (mysteriously missing the first EP) came out some time in the mid 1990s, and the Furious Years of Italian Hardcore compilation CD fills in the hole.

== Discography ==
Wretched / Indigesti split 7" (Autoproduzione, 1982)

- In nome del loro potere tutto è stato fatto EP (Autoproduzione, 1983)
- Finirà mai? EP (Autoproduzione, 1983)
- Libero di vivere libero di morire LP (Chaos Produzioni, 1984)
- La tua morte non aspetta 12" (Chaos Produzioni, 1986)
- In controluce 7" (Chaos Produzioni, 1988)

Reissues:

- The Furious Years of Italian Hardcore Punk CD (Antichrist / Dionysis, 1995 - contains the first EP)
- Lotta per vivere CD (Antichrist / Dionysis, 1996 - contains everything but the first EP)
