= Hardcore punk =

Aggressive and fast subgenre of punk rock

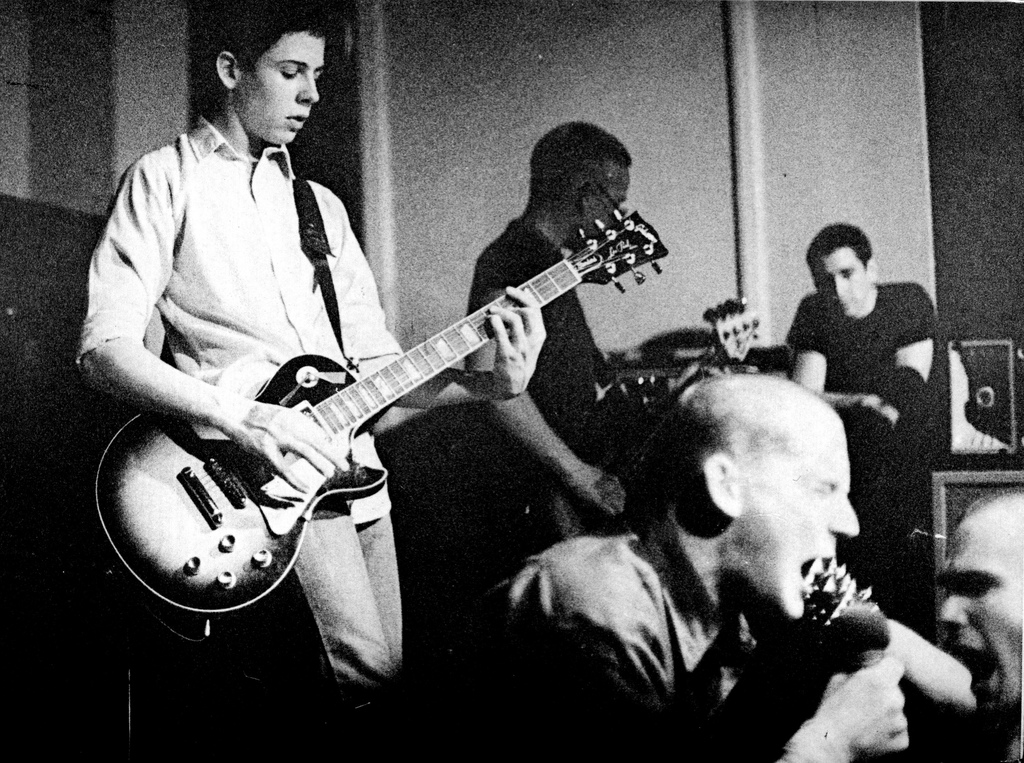
- Minor Threat performing in 1981
- Other names: Hardcore; hXc
- Stylistic origins: Punk rock; proto-punk
- Cultural origins: Late 1970s to early 1980s, Southern California, Vancouver, Knoxville, San Francisco, Washington, D.C. area
- Derivative forms: Alternative rock; black metal; crustcore; death metal; emo; grunge; noise rock; nu metal; post-hardcore; screamo; skate punk; slam death metal; speed metal; street punk; thrash metal

Subgenres
- Beatdown hardcore; Christian hardcore; D-beat; melodic hardcore; powerviolence; thrashcore; tough guy hardcore

Fusion genres
- Crossover thrash; digital hardcore; grindcore; jazzcore; mathcore; metalcore (deathcore); Nintendocore; rapcore; skacore; sludge metal (sludgecore)

Regional scenes
- Australia; Belgium; Brazil; California (Southern California); Canada; Italy; Japan; Spain; Sweden; United Kingdom

Local scenes
- Birmingham; Buenos Aires; Boston; Chicago; Detroit; Leeds; New York; Washington, D.C.; Basque country

Other topics
- Anarcho-punk; DIY ethic; extreme metal; hatecore; hardcore hip-hop; hardcore techno; hardcore skinhead; hardline; horror punk; moshing; Oi!; positive hardcore; punk subculture; straight edge; youth crew

Hardcore punk (commonly abbreviated to hardcore or hXc) is a punk rock subgenre and subculture that originated in the late 1970s. It is generally faster, harder, and more aggressive than other forms of punk rock music. Its roots can be traced to earlier punk scenes in San Francisco and Southern California which arose as a reaction against the still predominant hippie cultural climate of the time. It was also inspired by Washington, D.C., and New York punk rock and early proto-punk. Hardcore punk generally eschews commercialism, the established music industry and "anything similar to the characteristics of mainstream rock" and often addresses social and political topics with "confrontational, politically charged lyrics".

Hardcore sprouted underground scenes across the United States in the early 1980s, particularly in Los Angeles, San Francisco, Washington, D.C., Boston, and New York, as well as in Canada and the United Kingdom. Hardcore has spawned the straight edge movement and its associated sub-movements, hardline and youth crew. Hardcore was heavily involved in the rise of the independent record labels in the 1980s and with the DIY ethics in underground music scenes. It has also influenced various music genres that have experienced widespread commercial success, including grunge and thrash metal.

Although the music genre started in English-speaking Western countries, notable hardcore scenes have existed in Italy, Japan and Brazil.

== Characteristics ==
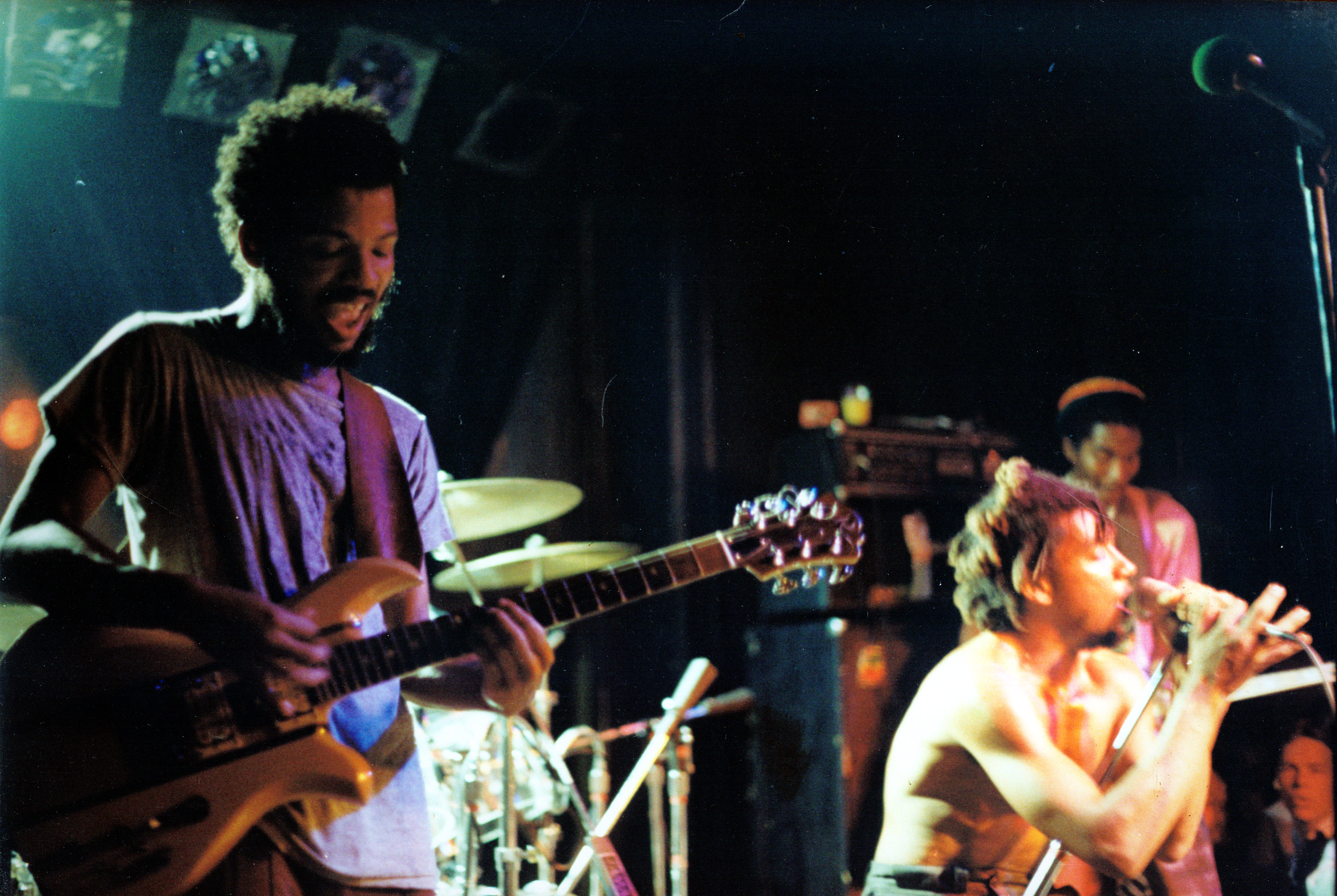
Bad Brains at 9:30 Club, Washington, D.C., 1983

Hardcore historian Steven Blush credits Minor Threat's Ian MacKaye with starting a "die-hard mindset that begat almost everything we now call Hardcore", which was virulently anti-music industry and anti-rock star. An article in Drowned in Sound argues that late 1970s/early 1980s-era hardcore is the true spirit of punk, because "all the poseurs and fashionistas fucked off to the next trend of skinny pink ties with New Romantic haircuts, singing wimpy lyrics" and the punk scene now consisted of people like Minor Threat, Bad Brains, Black Flag, and Circle Jerks, dedicated to the DIY ethics. Other writers have also attributed hardcore to a reaction against artsy and mellower sub-genres that punk grew into, such as post-punk and new wave. Hardcore punk additionally broke with original punk rock song patterns and visuals, favoring lower-key aesthetics.

=== Musical elements ===
One definition of the genre is "a form of exceptionally harsh punk rock". Hardcore has been called a faster, meaner genre of punk rock, that was a stern refutation against it, being more primal and immediate, with speed and aggression as the starting point.

In the vein of earlier punk rock, most hardcore punk bands have followed the traditional singer/guitar/bass/drum format. The song-writing has more emphasis on rhythm rather than melody. Blush writes "The Sex Pistols were still rock'n'roll...like the craziest version of Chuck Berry. Hardcore was a radical departure from that. It wasn't verse-chorus rock. It dispelled any notion of what songwriting is supposed to be. It's its own form." According to AllMusic, the overall blueprint for hardcore was playing louder, harder and faster. Hardcore was a reaction to the "cosmopolitan art-school" style of new wave music. Hardcore "eschew[ed] nuance, technique, [and] the avant-garde", and instead emphasized "speed and rhythmic intensity" using unpredictable song forms and abrupt tempo changes.

The impact of powerful volume is important in hardcore. Noisey magazine describes one hardcore band as "an all-encompassing, full-volume assault" in which "[e]very instrument sounds like it's competing for the most power and highest volume". Scott Wilson states that the hardcore of the Bad Brains emphasized two elements: "off-the-charts" loudness which reached a level of threatening, powerful "uncompromising noise" and rhythm, in place of the typically focused-on elements in mainstream rock music, harmony and pitch (i.e., melody).

Hardcore vocalists often shout, scream or chant along with the music, using "vocal intensity" and an abrasive tone. The shouting of hardcore vocalists is often accompanied by audience members who are singing along, making the hardcore vocalist like the "leader of a mob" commonly known as "gang vocals". Steven Blush describes one early Minor Threat show where the crowd was singing the lyrics so loud they could be heard over the PA system. Hardcore vocal lines are often based on minor scales and songs may include shouted background vocals from the other band members. Hardcore lyrics expressed the "frustration and political disillusionment" of youth who were against 1980s-era affluence, consumerism, greed, Reagan politics and authority. The polarizing sociopolitical messages in hardcore lyrics (and outrageous on-stage behaviour) meant that the genre garnered no mainstream popularity.

In hardcore, guitarists frequently play fast power chords with a heavily distorted and amplified tone, creating what has been called a "buzzsaw" sound. Guitar parts can sometimes be complex, technically versatile, and rhythmically challenging. Guitar melody lines usually use the same minor scales used by vocalists (although some solos use pentatonic scales). Hardcore guitarists sometimes play solos, octave leads and grooves, as well as tapping into the various feedback and harmonic noises available to them. There are generally fewer guitar solos in hardcore than in mainstream rock, because solos were viewed as representing the "excess and superficiality" of mainstream commercial rock.

Hardcore bassists use varied rhythms in their basslines, ranging from longer held notes (whole notes and half notes) to quarter notes, to rapid eighth note or sixteenth note runs. To play rapid bass lines that would be hard to play with the fingers, some bassists use a pick. Some bassists play fuzz bass by overdriving their bass tone.

Hardcore drumming, typically played fast and aggressively, has been called the "engine" and most essential element of the genre's aggressive sound of "unrelenting anger". Two other key elements for hardcore drummers are playing "tight" with the other musicians, especially the bassist (this does not mean metronomic time; indeed, coordinated tempo shifts are used in many important hardcore albums) and the drummer should have listened to a lot of hardcore, so that they can understand the "raw emotions" it expresses. Lucky Lehrer, the drummer and co-founder of the Circle Jerks in 1979, was an early developer of hardcore drumming; he has been called the "Godfather of hardcore drumming" and Flipside zine calls him the best punk drummer. According to Tobias Hurwitz, "[h]ardcore drumming falls somewhere between the straight-ahead rock styles of old-school punk and the frantic, warp-speed bashing of thrash." Some hardcore punk drummers play fast D-beat one moment and then drop tempo into elaborate musical breakdowns in the next. Drummers typically play eighth notes on the cymbals, because at the tempos used in hardcore, it would be difficult to play a smaller subdivision of the beat.

=== Dancing ===
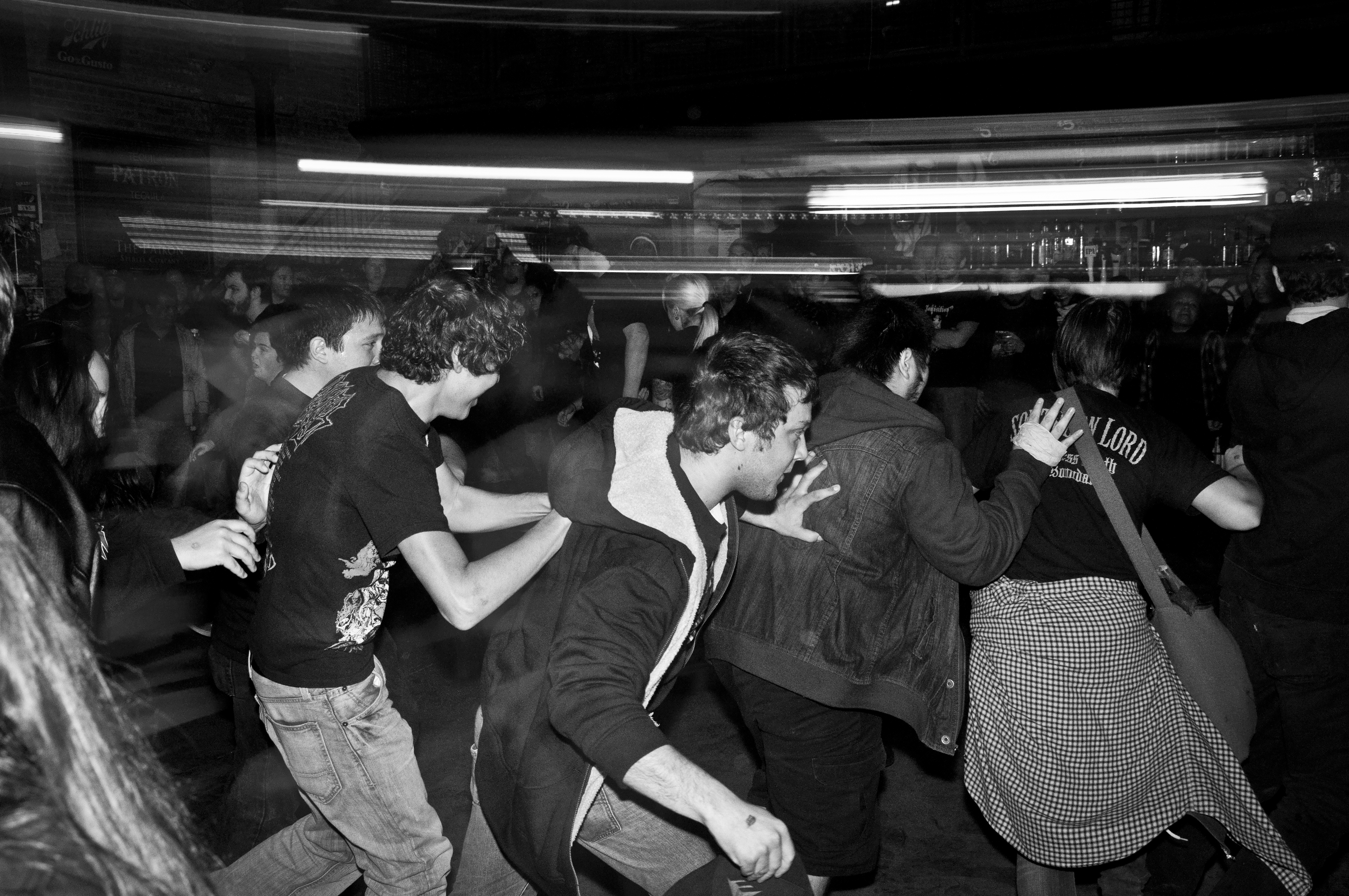
Audience members moshing to Toxic Holocaust

The early 1980s hardcore punk scene developed slam dancing (also called moshing), a style of dance in which participants push or slam into each other, and stage diving. Moshers have popularized a number of moves used in the pit, with some of the most notable being two-stepping, windmilling, the gorilla, and roundhouse kicking. Moshing works as a vehicle for expressing anger by "represent[ing] a way of playing at violence or roughness that allowed participants to mark their difference from the banal niceties of middle-class culture". Moshing is in another way a "parody of violence", that nevertheless leaves participants bruised and sometimes bleeding. The term mosh came into use in the early 1980s American hardcore scene in Washington, D.C. A performance by Fear on the 1981 Halloween episode of Saturday Night Live was cut short when moshers, including John Belushi and members of a few hardcore punk bands, invaded the stage, damaged studio equipment and used profanity.

=== Fashion ===
Many North American hardcore punk fans adopted a dressed-down style of T-shirts, jeans or work chinos, combat boots or sneakers, and crew cut-style haircuts. Women in the hardcore scene typically wore army pants, band T-shirts and hooded sweatshirts. The clothing style was a reflection of hardcore ideology, which included dissatisfaction with suburban America and the hypocrisy of American culture. It was essentially a deconstruction of American fashion staples—ripped jeans, holey T-shirts, torn stockings for women, and work boots.

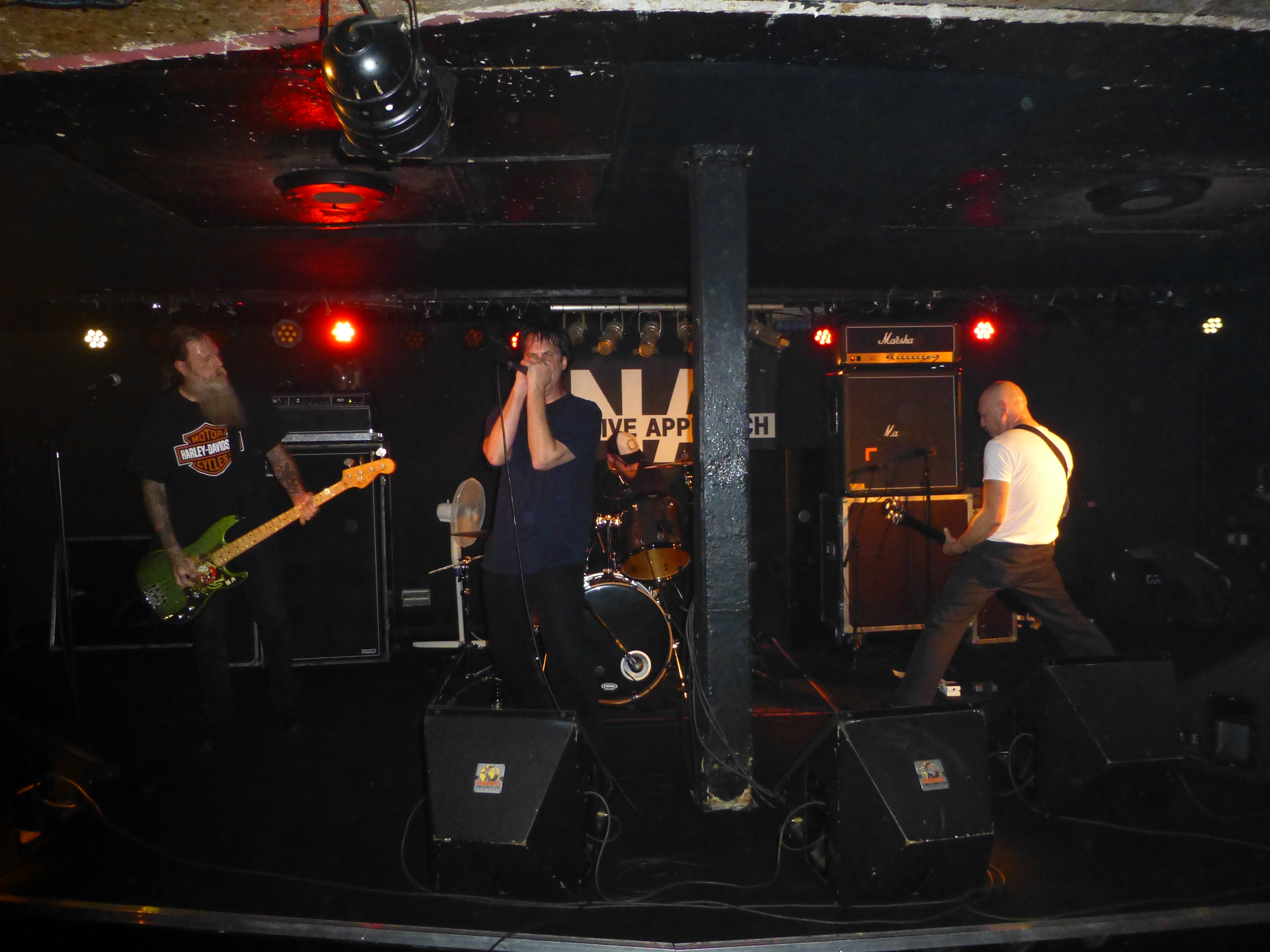
Negative Approach in T-shirts at a 2013 show

The style of the 1980s hardcore scene contrasted with the more provocative fashion styles of late 1970s punk rockers. Siri C. Brockmeier writes that "hardcore kids do not look like punks", since hardcore scene members wore basic clothing and short haircuts, in contrast to the "embellished leather jackets and pants" worn in the punk scene. Lauraine Leblanc, however, claims that the standard hardcore punk clothing and styles included torn jeans, leather jackets, spiked armbands, dog collars, mohawk hairstyles, DIY ornamentation of clothes with studs, painted band names, political statements, and patches. Tiffini A. Travis and Perry Hardy describe the look that was common in the San Francisco hardcore scene as consisting of biker-style leather jackets, chains, studded wristbands, multiple piercings, painted or tattooed statements (e.g., an anarchy symbol) and hairstyles ranging from military-style haircuts dyed black or blonde to mohawks and shaved heads.

Circle Jerks frontman Keith Morris wrote: "[Punk] was basically based on English fashion. But we had nothing to do with that. Black Flag and the Circle Jerks were so far from that. We looked like the kid who worked at the gas station or sub. shop." Henry Rollins stated that for him, getting dressed up meant putting on a black shirt and some dark pants; taking an interest in fashion as being a distraction. Jimmy Gestapo from Murphy's Law describes his own transition from dressing in a punk style (spiked hair and a bondage belt) to adopting a hardcore style (shaved head and boots) as being based on needing more functional clothing.

Skateboard culture, streetwear, and workwear are also major influences on clothing worn by participants in both past and present eras of hardcore.

=== Politics ===
Music writer Barney Hoskyns attributed hardcore being younger, faster and angrier than punk rock, to adolescents who were sick of their life in a "bland Republican" America. Hardcore punk lyrics often express antiestablishment, antimilitarist, antiauthoritarian, antiviolence, and pro-environmentalist sentiments, in addition to other typically left-wing, anarchist, or egalitarian political views. During the 1980s, the subculture often rejected what was perceived to be "yuppie" materialism and interventionist American foreign policy. Numerous hardcore punk bands have taken far-left political stances, such as anarchism or other varieties of socialism, and in the 1980s expressed opposition to political leaders such as then US president Ronald Reagan and British prime minister Margaret Thatcher. Reagan's economic policies, sometimes dubbed Reaganomics, and social conservatism were common subjects for criticism by hardcore bands of the time. Jimmy Gestapo of Murphy's Law, however, endorsed Reagan and even went as far to call then former president Jimmy Carter a "pussy" in a 1986 New York Magazine cover story. Shortly after Reagan's death in 2004, the Maximumrocknroll radio show aired an episode composed of anti-Reagan songs by early hardcore punk bands.

Certain hardcore punk bands have conveyed messages sometimes deemed "politically incorrect" by placing offensive content in their lyrics and relying on stage antics to shock listeners and people in their audience. Boston band The F.U.'s generated controversy with their 1983 album, My America, whose lyrics contained what appeared to be conservative and patriotic views. Its messages were sometimes taken literally, when they were actually intended as a parody of conservative bands. Another act from Massachusetts, Vile, were known to insult women, minorities and gay people in their lyrics and would even go as far as putting their albums on the windshields of people's cars. On the other hand, Tim Yohannan and the influential punk rock fanzine Maximumrocknroll were criticized by some punks for acting as the "politically correct scene police", having what was perceived to be "a very narrow definition of what fits into Punk", apparently being "authoritarian and trying to dominate the scene" with their views.

During the 2001–2009 United States presidency of George W. Bush, it was not uncommon for hardcore bands to express anti-Bush messages. During the 2004 United States presidential election, several hardcore punk artists and bands were involved with the anti-Bush political activist group PunkVoter. A minority of hardcore musicians have expressed right-wing views, such as the band Antiseen, whose guitarist Joe Young ran for public office as a North Carolina Libertarian. Former Misfits singer Michale Graves appeared on an episode of The Daily Show, voicing support for George W. Bush, on behalf of the Conservative Punk website, and in 2023 testified on behalf of the far-right Proud Boys during their sedition trial for their role in attacking the U.S. Capitol on January 6, 2021.

=== Demographics ===
While the early hardcore scene was mostly young white males, both onstage and in the audience, there are notable exceptions. Black musicians include Bad Brains, Fred "Freak" Smith of Beefeater, Dead Kennedys drummer D.H. Peligro, and Scream bassist Skeeter Thompson. Numerous Black and Latino members have been in the band Suicidal Tendencies, including Mike Muir, Rocky George, R.J. Herrera, Louiche Mayorga, Robert Trujillo, Thundercat, Dean Pleasants, Ra Díaz, Dave Lombardo, Eric Moore, Tim "Rawbiz" Williams, David Hidalgo Jr., and Ronald Bruner Jr. Other Latinos in early hardcore bands include Black Flag members Ron Reyes, Dez Cadena, Robo, and Anthony Martinez, Agnostic Front singer Roger Miret, his brother Madball singer Freddy Cricien, Adolescents guitarist Steve Soto, and Wasted Youth drummer Joey Castillo. Soto would later form the all-Latino punk band Manic Hispanic, which also featured Efrem Schulz from Death By Stereo. There are also notable women such as Crass singers Joy de Vivre and Eve Libertine, Black Flag bassist Kira Roessler, and Germs bassist Lorna Doom.

Several documentaries, including 2003's Afro-Punk and 2016's Los Punks, chronicle these subcultures within American punk and hardcore.

As of 2019, the genre is still overwhelmingly represented by white males. However, as sonic diversity has increased in the genre, so too has its fanbase. This has helped bring greater attention to inclusivity within the scene. Bands like War On Women, Limp Wrist, Gouge Away, and G.L.O.S.S. have helped bring attention to subjects like women's rights, transphobia, rape, mental health, queer rights, and misogyny.

=== Record labels ===
Record labels in hardcore are often DIY endeavors, run by musicians or participants within the community. Largely inspired by early labels like Dischord Records, Alternative Tentacles, Epitaph Records, SST Records, Revelation Records, and Touch & Go Records, record labels are usually run on DIY ethic, collaboration, financial trust, and an emphasis on creative control. Labels within hardcore are seldom large, profit-making operations, but rather collaborative music partners with the intent to document and release music for the underground community.

Ian Mackaye, co-founder of Dischord Records claimed, "We don't use contracts, lawyers, any of those kinds of things. We are partners – they make the music, and we make the records. From the beginning of this label, people have said that the way we do things is unsustainable, unrealistic, idealistic, and we were just dreaming", he said. "Well, the dream is now 35 years old, so they can go fuck themselves."

== Etymology ==
During the early 1980s, the genre was popularly referred to using the name "thrash", as shown on the 1982 hardcore compilation album New York Thrash. In the following years, "thrash metal" began being used to refer to the fusion of the genre and heavy metal music. By the middle of the decade, "thrash" had instead evolved to become a shortened name for the thrash metal fusion genre, becoming increasingly less common as a descriptor for hardcore.

Steven Blush states that the Vancouver-based band D.O.A.'s 1981 album, Hardcore '81, "was where the genre got its name". This album also helped to make people aware of the term "hardcore". Konstantin Butz states that while the origin of the expression "hardcore" "cannot be ascribed to a specific place or time", the term is "usually associated with the further evolution of California's L.A. Punk Rock scene", which included young skateboarders. A September 1981 article by Tim Sommer shows the author applying the term to the "15 or so" punk bands gigging around the city at that time, which he considered a belated development relative to Los Angeles, San Francisco, and Washington, D.C. Blush said that the term "hardcore" is also a reference to the sense of being "fed up" with the existing punk and new wave music. Blush also states that the term refers to "an extreme: the absolute most Punk". Kelefa Sanneh states that the term "hardcore" referred to an attitude of "turning inwards" towards the scene and "ignoring broader society", all with the goal of achieving a sense of "shared purpose" and being part of a community. Sanneh cites Agnostic Front's band member selection approach as an example of hardcore's emphasis on "scene citizenship"; prospective members of the band were chosen based on being part of the local hardcore scene and being regularly in the moshing pit at shows, rather than based on a musical audition.

== History ==
=== Late 1970s and early 1980s ===
==== United States ====
===== Los Angeles =====
Hardcore punk drew a line in the sand between older and avant-garde rock fans and a new bunch of kids who were coming up. On one side there were those who considered the music (and its fans) loud, ugly and incoherent: to the folks on the other side, hardcore was the only music that mattered. A rare generational divide in rock music had arisen. And that's when exciting things happen.

— Music journalist Michael Azerrad in the book Our Band Could Be Your Life (2001)

Michael Azerrad states that "[by] 1979 the original punk scene [in Southern California] had almost completely died out" and was replaced by punk music boiled down to its essence, but with faster tempos, which became known as "hardcore". Steven Blush states that the first hardcore record to come out of the West Coast was Out of Vogue by the Santa Ana band Middle Class. The band pioneered a shouted, fast version of punk rock which would shape the hardcore sound that would soon emerge. In terms of impact upon the hardcore scene, Black Flag has been deemed the most influential group. Azerrad calls Black Flag the "godfathers" of hardcore punk and states that even "...more than the flagship band of American hardcore", they were "...required listening for anyone who was interested in underground music." Blush states that Black Flag were to hardcore what the Sex Pistols and Ramones were to punk. Formed in Hermosa Beach, California by guitarist and primary songwriter Greg Ginn, they played their first show in December 1977. Originally called Panic, they changed their name to Black Flag in 1978. In 2002, during an interview with Nardwuar, Dead Kennedys singer Jello Biafra was asked what he believed to be the first hardcore record, he remarked: "Sound Of Imker Train of Doomsday single in the late '60s in Holland. The only true '60s hardcore record I know."

By 1979, Black Flag were joined by another South Bay hardcore band, the Minutemen, with whom they shared a practice space until both bands were evicted, as well as the Circle Jerks (which featured Black Flag's original singer, Keith Morris). From Hollywood, two other bands playing hardcore punk, Fear and the Germs, were featured with Black Flag and the Circle Jerks in Penelope Spheeris' 1981 documentary The Decline of Western Civilization. By the time the film was released, other hardcore bands from Los Angeles County were also making a name for themselves including Bad Religion, Descendents, Red Kross, Rhino 39, Suicidal Tendencies, Wasted Youth, Youth Brigade, and Youth Gone Mad. Neighboring Orange County had the Adolescents, Agent Orange, China White, Social Distortion, Shattered Faith, T.S.O.L., and Uniform Choice, while north of Los Angeles, around Oxnard, California, a hardcore scene known as "nardcore" developed with bands like Agression, Ill Repute, Dr. Know, and Rich Kids on LSD.

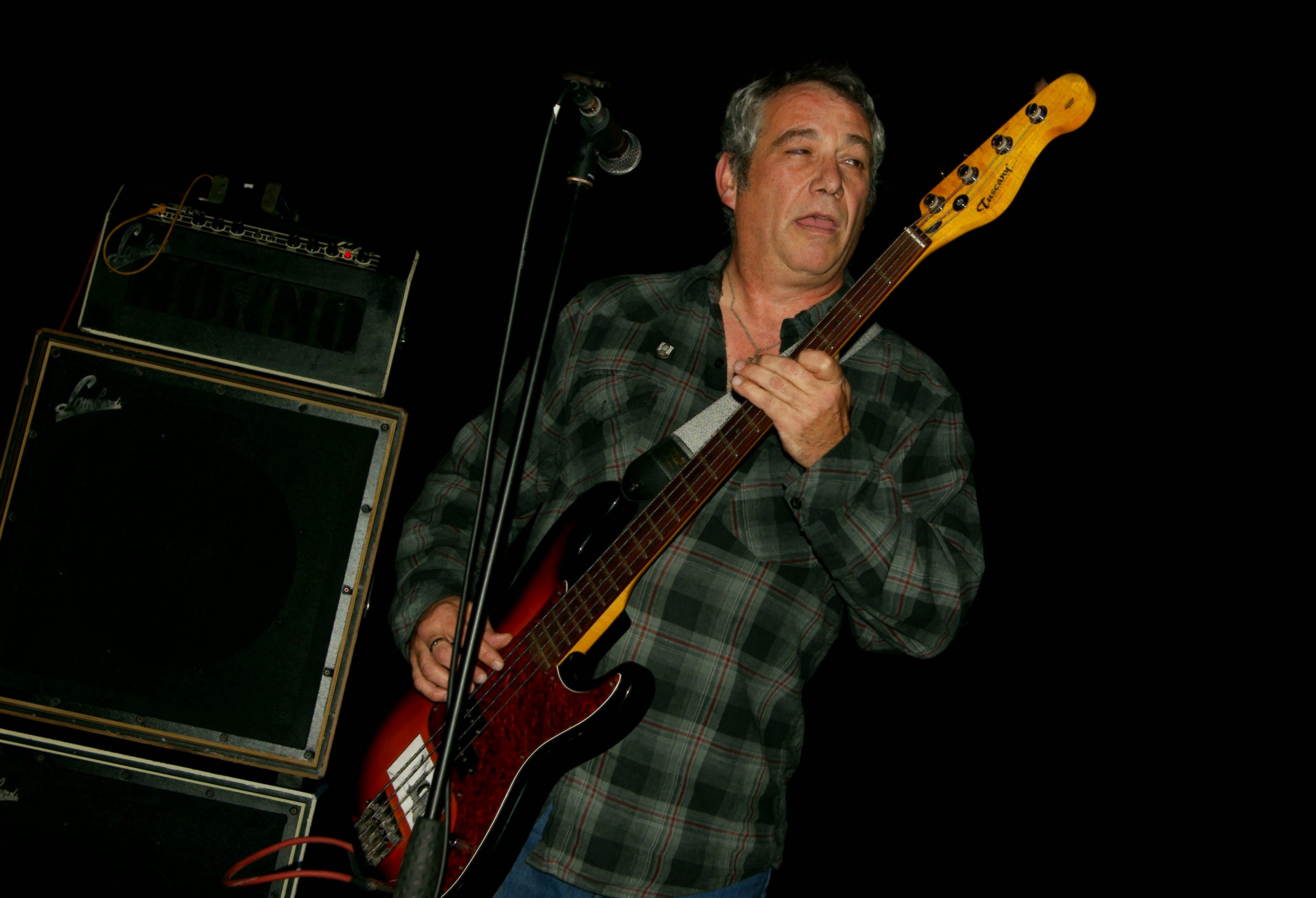
Mike Watt, formerly the bassist for the Minutemen in a 2013 show

Whilst popular traditional punk bands such as the Clash, Ramones, and Sex Pistols were signed to major record labels, the hardcore punk bands were generally not. Black Flag, however, was briefly signed to MCA subsidiary Unicorn Records but were dropped because an executive considered their music to be "anti-parent". Instead of trying to be courted by the major labels, hardcore bands started their own independent record labels and distributed their records themselves. Ginn started SST Records, which released Black Flag's debut EP Nervous Breakdown in 1979. SST went on to release a number of albums by other hardcore artists, and was described by Azerrad as "easily the most influential and popular underground indie of the Eighties." SST was followed by a number of other successful artist-run labels—including BYO Records (started by Shawn and Mark Stern of Youth Brigade), Epitaph Records (started by Brett Gurewitz of Bad Religion), New Alliance Records (started by the Minutemen's D. Boon and Mike Watt), as well as fan-run labels like Frontier Records and Slash Records.

Bands also funded and organized their own tours. Black Flag's tours in 1980 and 1981 brought them in contact with developing hardcore scenes in many parts of North America, and blazed trails that were followed by other touring bands. Concerts in the early Los Angeles hardcore scene increasingly became sites of violent battles between police and concertgoers. Another source of violence in L.A. was tension created by what one writer calls the invasion of "antagonistic suburban poseurs" into hardcore venues. Violence at hardcore concerts was portrayed in episodes of the popular television shows CHiPs and Quincy, M.E..

In the pre-Internet era, fanzines, commonly called zines, enabled hardcore scene members to learn about bands, clubs, and record labels. Zines typically included reviews of shows and records, interviews with bands, letters, ads for records and labels, and were DIY products, "proudly amateur, usually handmade. A zine called We Got Power described the Los Angeles scene from 1981 to 1984, and it included show reviews and band interviews with groups including D.O.A., the Misfits, Black Flag, Suicidal Tendencies and the Circle Jerks.

===== San Francisco =====
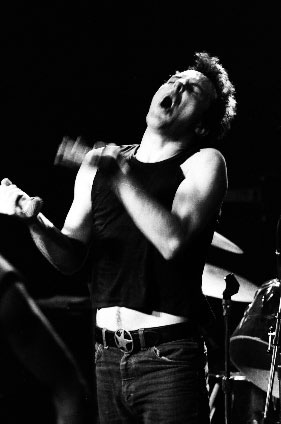
Jello Biafra performing with the Dead Kennedys

Shortly after Black Flag debuted in Los Angeles, Dead Kennedys were formed in San Francisco. While the band's early releases were played in a style closer to traditional punk rock, In God We Trust, Inc. (1981) marked a shift into hardcore. Similar to Black Flag and Youth Brigade, Dead Kennedys released their albums on their own label, which in DK's case was Alternative Tentacles. The scene was helped in particular by the San Francisco club Mabuhay Gardens, whose promoter, Dirk Dirksen, became known as "The Pope of Punk". Another important local institution was Tim Yohannan's Maximumrocknroll, which started as a radio show in 1977, but branched out into a fanzine in 1982.

While not as large as the scene in Los Angeles, the hardcore scene of the early 1980s included a number of noteworthy bands originating from the San Francisco Bay Area, including Bl'ast, Crucifix, the Faction, Fang, Flipper, and Whipping Boy. Additionally, during this time, seminal Texas-based bands Dirty Rotten Imbeciles, the Dicks, MDC, Rhythm Pigs, and Verbal Abuse all relocated to San Francisco. Further out of the Bay Area, Sacramento's Tales of Terror were cited by many, including Mark Arm, as a key inspiration for the grunge movement.

===== Washington, D.C. =====
The first hardcore punk band to form on the East Coast of the United States was Washington, D.C.'s Bad Brains. Initially formed in 1977 as a jazz fusion ensemble called Mind Power, and consisting of all African-American members, their early foray into hardcore featured some of the fastest tempos in rock music. The band released its debut single, "Pay to Cum", in 1980, and were influential in establishing the D.C. hardcore scene. Hardcore historian Steven Blush calls the single the first East Coast hardcore record.

Ian MacKaye and Jeff Nelson, influenced by Bad Brains, formed the band Teen Idles in 1979. The group broke up in 1980, and MacKaye and Nelson went on to form Minor Threat, a band which, apart from Bad Brains, has arguably had the biggest influence on the hardcore punk genre, and whose contributions to the music, ethics, aesthetic, and ethos are still widely acknowledged by hardcore bands of the 2020s. The band used faster rhythms and more aggressive, less melodic riffs than was common at the time. Minor Threat popularized the straight edge movement with its song "Straight Edge", which spoke out against alcohol, drugs and promiscuity. MacKaye and Nelson ran their own record label, Dischord Records, which released records by D.C. hardcore bands, including the Faith, Iron Cross, Scream, State of Alert, Government Issue, Void, and D.C.'s Youth Brigade. The Flex Your Head compilation was a seminal document of the early 1980s D.C. hardcore scene. The record label was run out of the Dischord House, a Washington, D.C., punk house. Henry Rollins, who would come to prominence as the lead singer of the California-based Black Flag, as well as his own later Rollins Band, grew up in Washington, D.C., singing for the State of Alert, and was influenced by the music of Bad Brains and the bands of his childhood friend Ian MacKaye.

The tradition of holding all-ages shows at small DIY spaces, has roots in the early Washington, D.C., straight edge movement. It emerged from the idea that people of all ages should have access to music, regardless of if they're old enough to drink alcohol.

===== Boston =====
Seminal Boston-area hardcore bands included the F.U.'s, the Freeze, Gang Green, Jerry's Kids, Siege, DYS, Negative FX, and SS Decontrol. Members of the latter three bands were influenced by D.C.'s straight edge scene, and were part of "the Boston Crew", a mostly straight edge group of friends known to physically fight people who used alcohol or drugs. Members of the Boston Crew would later go on to form the band Slapshot, and also included future Mighty Mighty Bosstones singer Dicky Barrett, who was then a member of the band Impact Unit, and drew the artwork for the DYS album Brotherhood.

In 1982, Modern Method Records released This Is Boston, Not L.A., a compilation album of the Boston hardcore scene. In addition to Modern Method was Taang! Records, who released material by a number of the aforementioned Boston hardcore bands.

Further outside of Boston were Western Massachusetts bands Deep Wound (which featured future Dinosaur Jr. members J Mascis and Lou Barlow) and the Outpatients, both of whom would come to Boston to play shows. From nearby Manchester, New Hampshire, was G.G. Allin, a solo singer who, contrary to straight edge, used large amounts of drugs and alcohol, eventually dying of a heroin overdose. Allin's stage show included defecating on stage and then throwing his feces at the audience.

===== New York =====
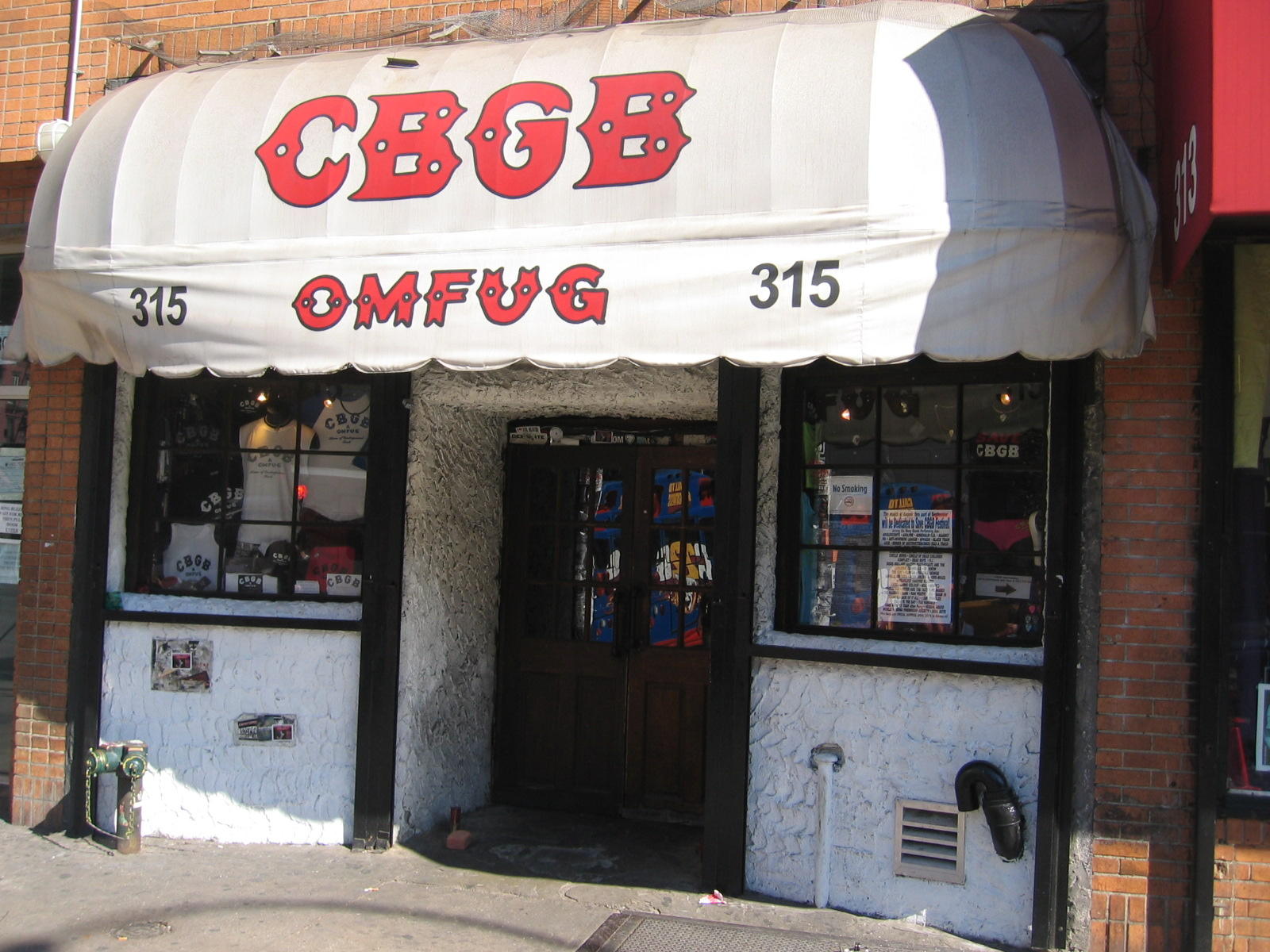
Facade of the music club CBGB in New York City

The New York City hardcore scene emerged in 1981 when Bad Brains moved to the city from Washington, D.C. Starting in 1981, there was an influx of new hardcore bands in the city including Agnostic Front, Beastie Boys, Cro-Mags, Cause for Alarm, the Mob, Murphy's Law, Reagan Youth, and Warzone. A number of other bands associated with New York hardcore scene came from New Jersey, including the Misfits, Adrenalin OD and Hogan's Heroes. Steven Blush calls the Misfits "crucial to the rise of hardcore." New York hardcore had more emphasis on rhythm, in part due to the use of palm-muted guitar chords, an approach called the NY hardcore "chug". The New York scene was known for its tough ethos, its "thuggery", and club shows that were a chaotic "proving ground" or even a "battleground".

In the early 1980s, the New York hardcore scene centered around squats and clubhouses. After these were closed down, the scene was emanating in a small after-hours bar, A7, on the Lower East Side of Manhattan, and later around the famous bar CBGB. For several years, CBGB held weekly hardcore matinées on Sundays, but they stopped in 1990 when violence led Kristal to ban hardcore shows at the club.

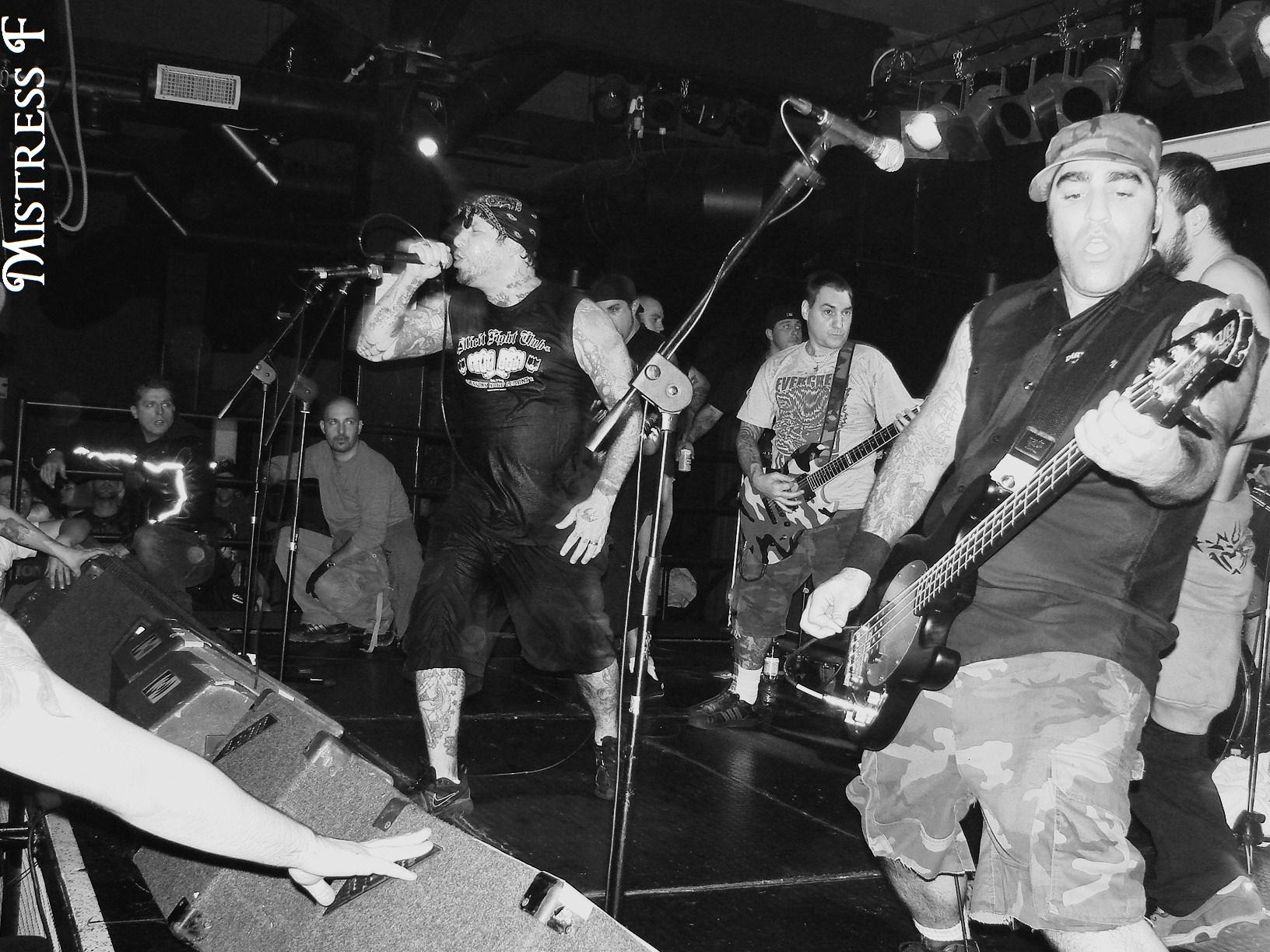
Agnostic Front performing

Early radio support in New York's surrounding Tri-State area came from Pat Duncan, who had hosted live punk and hardcore bands weekly on WFMU since 1979. Bridgeport, Connecticut's WPKN had a radio show featuring hardcore called Capital Radio, hosted by Brad Morrison, beginning in February 1979 and continuing weekly until late 1983. In New York City, Tim Sommer hosted Noise The Show on WNYU.

By 1984, the Ramones, one of the original New York punk bands, were experimenting with hardcore, the first recordings of which included two songs, "Wart Hog" and "Endless Vacation" on their album Too Tough To Die.

===== Other American regions =====
Minneapolis hardcore consisted of bands such as Hüsker Dü and the Replacements, while Chicago had Articles of Faith, Big Black and Naked Raygun. The Detroit area was home to Crucifucks, Degenerates, the Meatmen, Negative Approach, Spite and Violent Apathy. From Ohio was Maumee's Necros and Dayton's Toxic Reasons. The zine Touch and Go covered this Midwest hardcore scene from 1979 to 1983.

JFA and Meat Puppets were both from Phoenix, Arizona; 7 Seconds were from Reno, Nevada; and Butthole Surfers, Big Boys, the Dicks, Dirty Rotten Imbeciles (D.R.I.), Really Red, Verbal Abuse and MDC were from Texas. Portland, Oregon, hardcore punk bands included Poison Idea and Final Warning, while north of there, Washington state included the Accüsed, Melvins, the Fartz, and 10 Minute Warning (the latter two included future Guns N' Roses member Duff McKagan). Other prominent hardcore bands from this time that came from areas without large scenes include Raleigh, North Carolina's Corrosion of Conformity.

==== Canada ====
D.O.A. formed in Vancouver, British Columbia in 1978 and were one of the first bands to refer to its style as "hardcore", with the release of their album Hardcore '81. Other early hardcore bands from British Columbia included Dayglo Abortions who formed in 1979, the Subhumans and the Skulls.

Nomeansno is a hardcore band originally from Victoria, British Columbia, and now located in Vancouver. SNFU formed in Edmonton in 1981 and also later relocated to Vancouver. Bunchofuckingoofs, from the Kensington Market neighbourhood of Toronto, Ontario, formed in November 1983 as a response to "a local war with glue huffing Nazi skinheads". In Montreal, The Asexuals helped fertilize a scene that became a necessary tour stop for punk and hardcore bands headed to the Northeast.

==== United Kingdom ====
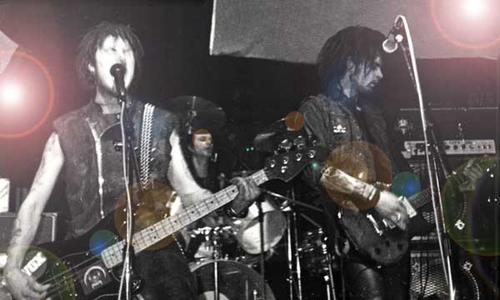
The UK anarcho-punk and D-beat band Antisect playing in Brighton in 1985

In the United Kingdom, a fertile hardcore scene took root early on. Referred to under a number of names including "U.K. Hardcore", "UK 82", "second wave punk", "real punk", and "No Future punk", it took the previous punk sound and added the incessant, heavy drumbeats and heavily distorted guitar sound of new wave of British heavy metal bands, especially Motörhead. Formed in 1977 in Stoke-on-Trent, Discharge played a large role in influencing other European hardcore bands. AllMusic calls the band's sound a "high-speed noise overload" characterized by "ferocious noise blasts." Their style of hardcore punk was coined as D-beat, a term referring to a distinctive drum beat that a number of 1980s imitators of Discharge are associated with.

Another UK band, the Varukers, were one of the original D-beat bands, Scottish band the Exploited were also influential, with the term "UK 82" (used to refer to UK hardcore in the early 1980s) being taken from one of their songs. They contrasted with early American hardcore bands by placing an emphasis on appearance. Frontman Walter "Wattie" Buchan had a giant red mohawk and the band continued to wear swastikas, an approach influenced by the wearing of this symbol by 1970s punks such as Sid Vicious. Because of this, the Exploited were labeled by others in the scene as "cartoon punks". Other influential UK hardcore bands from this period included GBH, Anti-Establishment, Antisect, Broken Bones, Chaos UK, Conflict, Dogsflesh, English Dogs, and grindcore innovators Napalm Death.

==== Other countries ====
There was an Italian hardcore punk scene in the 1980s that included groups like Wretched, Raw Power, and Negazione. Sweden developed several influential hardcore bands, including Anti Cimex, Disfear, and Mob 47. Finland produced some influential hardcore bands, including Terveet Kädet, one of the first hardcore groups to emerge in the country. In Eastern Europe, notable hardcore bands included Hungary's Galloping Coroners from 1975, Yugoslavia's 1980s-era Niet from Ljubljana, Patareni from Zagreb and KBO! from Kragujevac.

A Japanese hardcore scene arose to protest the social and economic changes sweeping the country in the late 1970s and during the 1980s. The band SS is regarded as the first, forming in 1977. Bands such as the Stalin and GISM soon followed, both forming in 1980. Other notable Japanese hardcore bands include Balzac, Bomb Factory, Disclose (a D-beat band), Garlic Boys, Gauze, SOB, and the Star Club.

=== Mid–to–late 1980s ===
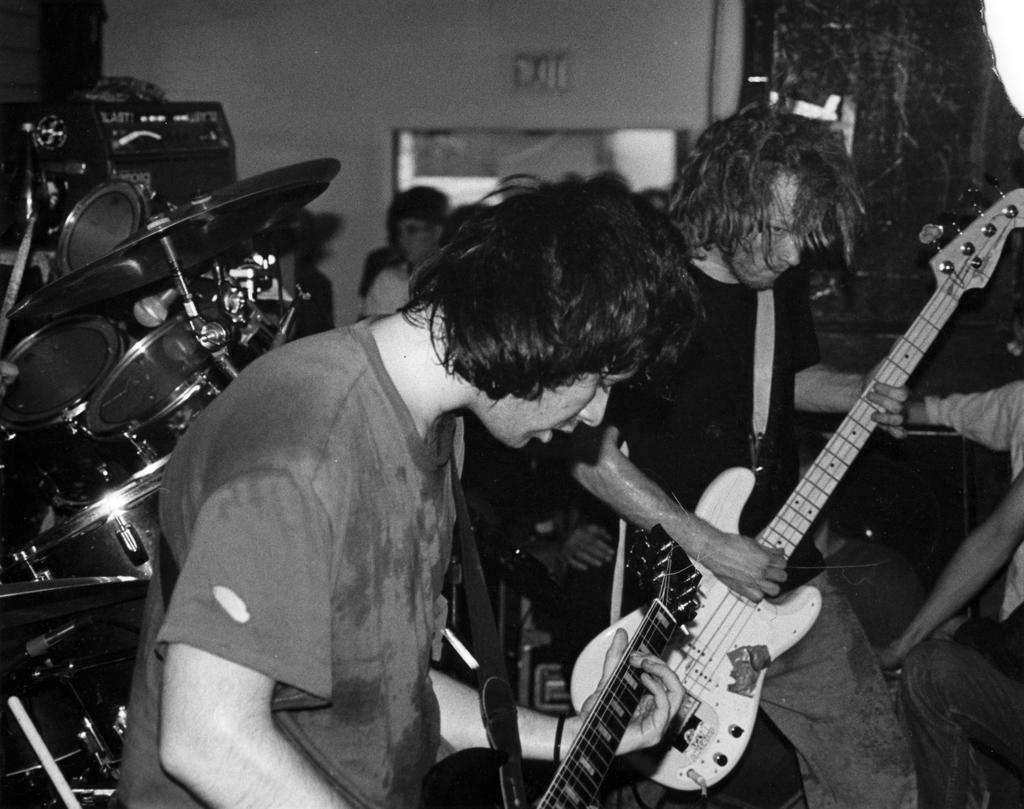
Corrosion of Conformity playing in Denver in 1986

The mid-1980s were a time of transition for the hardcore scene, with a number of influential bands from earlier in the decade changing their sound or breaking up. For instance, Black Flag's 1984 album My War, which coincided with the band members growing their hair long, were criticized for having "gone heavy metal". The album's second side was called a road map for sludge metal, as well as being influenced by doom metal bands. Black Flag's eventual breakup in 1986 would coincide with the breakup of one of the other most influential hardcore bands, the Dead Kennedys.

By 1985, Boston bands SS Decontrol and DYS became metal bands, while the F.U.'s did the same, but changed their name to "Straw Dogs". By the end of the year, both SSD and DYS had broken up. Other bands in the mid-'80s that went from being strictly hardcore to adding more metal riffs developed an even heavier sound, with Corrosion of Conformity, Cro-Mags and D.R.I., becoming known as crossover thrash bands. Bands like Cro-Mags looked to early Bad Brains songs such as Supertouch/Shitfit as inspiration for heavy breakdowns in hardcore punk music.

Bad Religion briefly broke up in 1984, after making the progressive rock album Into the Unknown. They returned to their roots on the 1985 Back to the Known EP, and then began their embrace of more melodic straightforward punk rock, starting with 1988's Suffer. In 1986, Los Angeles's Youth Brigade changed their name to The Brigade, and changed their sound to a style that The Los Angeles Times compared to mainstream bands like U2, R.E.M., and Big Country. They broke up the following year.

Bands such as Minutemen, Meat Puppets, Hüsker Dü and the Replacements, changed their style, becoming alternative rock. Around the same time, a social movement within the influential hardcore punk scene of Washington, D.C., occurred during the summer of 1985, dubbed Revolution Summer. The movement challenged the initial wave of hardcore music, the attitudes of fans and bands before them and also the image mainstream media portrayed of punks. The bands that spawned out of Revolution Summer often took a stand against violence, especially at shows in the form of slam dancing, as well as standing up against the sexism of the scene. Bands associated with the movement, such as Rites of Spring, Embrace, and Dag Nasty, are notable for having inspired the emotional hardcore and the original emo genre of the late 1980s and 1990s. The subsequent post-hardcore music genre, spearheaded by bands like Fugazi, is an evolution of hardcore which was created by participants of the Revolution Summer movement. T.S.O.L., who had already embraced goth rock, became a hard rock band with 1986's Revenge, being compared to Poison and Faster Pussycat, and touring with Guns N' Roses. Red Kross's second album, 1987's Neurotica, was described as a blend of pop rock and art rock. The Beastie Boys gained fame by playing hip-hop, and Bad Brains incorporated more reggae into their music, such as in their 1989 album Quickness.

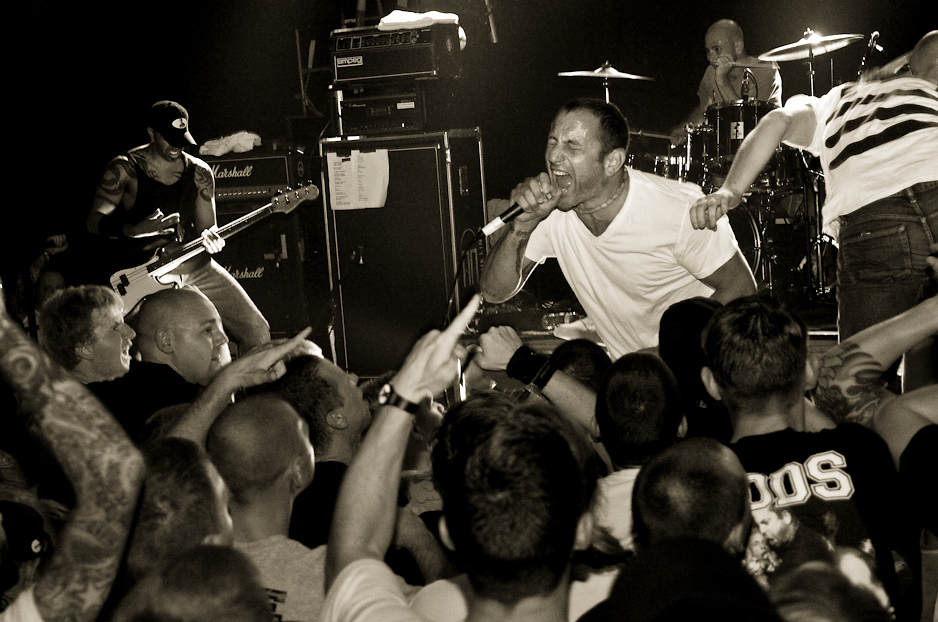
Youth of Today at a 2010 show

Starting in 1986, the youth crew movement, became prominent in New York hardcore. Inspired by early hardcore bands such as 7 Seconds, Minor Threat and SSD, whose members were all straight edge and lyrical concerns included brotherhood and community values, youth crew was a reaction against the prevailing metal influence in hardcore at the time. The movement was based around Youth of Today, and fleshed out by bands signed to Youth of Today vocalist Ray Cappo's record label Revelation Records, including Gorilla Biscuits, Bold and Side by Side. Following the release of their second album Break Down the Walls (1986), Youth of Today toured extensively across the United States and internationally, leading to youth crew ideals spreading and the formation of many subsequent bands. Youth crew took a particular hold in Southern California, where Chain of Strength became one of the style's premier bands. As the style progressed, it too became influenced by the metal it originally opposed, seen in the musical style of Judge.

In the late 1980s, a more militant subculture of straight edge called hardline emerged through members of the anarcho punk scene and embraced veganism and radical environmentalism. Vegan Reich began as a crew of Animal Liberationists before becoming a band in order to promote their views in 1986; however, the group split from the wider U.S. anarchist movement in 1988 due to backlash from the community for their anti-carnist views. Vegan Reich vocalist Sean Muttaqi and Raid vocalist Steve Lovett created hardline philosophy and pioneered its musical movement alongside the English band Statement. Although hardline was overtly a political, anarchist school of thought rather than a hardcore subculture, hardline activists began to push their views specifically towards those in the mid to late 1980s straight edge scene due to the scene's wider appeal. The movement quickly gained popularity in Memphis and Indianapolis, before then spreading to Salt Lake City and Syracuse.

=== 1990s ===
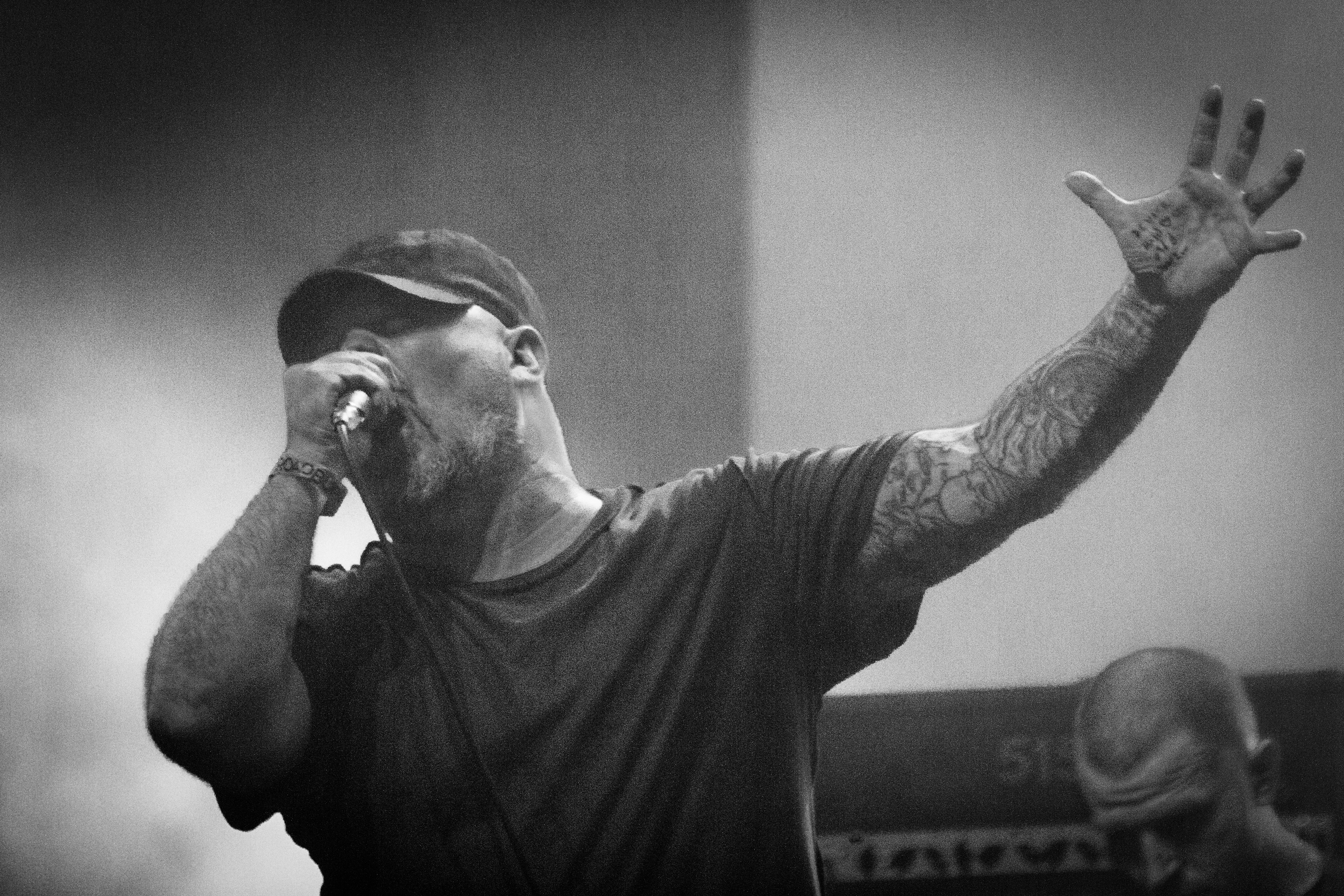
Integrity were one of the pioneers of metalcore in the early 1990s.

The early 1990s saw the pioneering of metalcore. One of the earliest metalcore scenes was that of Cleveland, Ohio, fronted by Integrity and Ringworm. Integrity's debut album Those Who Fear Tomorrow (1991) merged hardcore with apocalyptic lyrics and metal's guitar solos and chugging riffs to create one of the primeval albums in the genre. Revolver magazine writer Elis Enis stated that the album "influenced practically every breakdown that's been recorded since". Philadelphia's Starkweather and New Jersey's Rorschach were also early bands in the genre. In 1993, Earth Crisis released "Firestorm", one of the most influential songs in the genre. which ultimately popularised the militant vegan straight edge ethic and chug riffs. Soon after, the sound spread to Boston with Overcast and Converge and New York City with All Out War and Merauder.

During this era in mainstream music, punk rock became a success in 1994 with popular bands like Green Day, the Offspring, and Rancid. While typically playing pop punk, Green Day's 1997 album Nimrod contained two songs ("Platypus [I Hate You]" and "Take Back") that were described as hardcore; meanwhile, Rancid would record a hardcore album with 2000's Rancid. The same year, punk became popular again in 1994, Sick of It All released the major label album Scratch the Surface. According to lead singer Lou Koller, people thought that they would go from a hardcore band to sounding like Green Day, so they intentionally made an album heavier than anything they'd done before. The album became a surprise success, with the single "Step Down" becoming a staple on MTV, thanks to a tongue-in-cheek music video featuring a roving reporter "exposing" the world of hardcore, and showing how to do various hardcore dance moves. The decade also saw a rise in pop-punk bands like New Found Glory and Saves the Day, which garnered attention from fans of hardcore due to band member connections to the contemporary hardcore scene.

As a reaction against the dominance of metal-influenced hardcore amongst straight edge bands, around 1996, a revival of the sound of the youth crew bands began. Bands including In My Eyes, Bane, Ten Yard Fight and Floorpunch, used the key aspects of late 1980s bands such as the gang vocals, high tempos and lyrical themes of straight edge, unity and vegetarianism. Additionally, at this time, Youth of Today's Ray Cappo formed Better Than a Thousand with Ken Olden and Graham Land of early 1990s straight edge band Battery, creating a sound, too, harkening back to this era. Further bands meshed straight edge with additional causes, such as Christian hardcore bands Call to Preserve, the Red Baron, xLooking Forwardx, Jewish band Sons of Abraham, queercore band Limp Wrist, right-wing anti-immigrant band One Life Crew, and anti-capitalism bands Manliftingbanner and Refused.

In the late 1990s, a number of movements that attempted to rebel against the hypermasculinity that hardcore had come to embrace. One of these was fashioncore, which originated from Orange County, California metalcore bands, particularly Eighteen Visions. The movement placed emphasis on the fashion style of the musicians and saw many in hardcore begin to wear skinny jeans, collared shirts and white belts and adopting dyed, straightened and swooping fringed hairstyles. Sass music began with this same intention, doing so by incorporating elements such as homoerotic lyrics, lisped vocals, dance parts and sometimes synths.

As the 1990s drew to a close, a wave of metalcore bands began incorporating elements of melodic death metal into their sound. This formed an early version of what would become the melodic metalcore genre, with Shadows Fall's Somber Eyes to the Sky (1997), Undying's This Day All Gods Die (1999), Darkest Hour's The Prophecy Fulfilled (1999), Unearth's Above the Fall of Man (1999), Prayer for Cleansing's Rain in Endless Fall (1999) being some of the style's earliest releases. CMJ writer Anthony Delia also credited Florida's Poison the Well and their first two releases The Opposite of December... A Season of Separation (1999) and Tear from the Red (2002) as "design[ing] the template for most of" the melodic metalcore bands to come.

=== 2000s ===
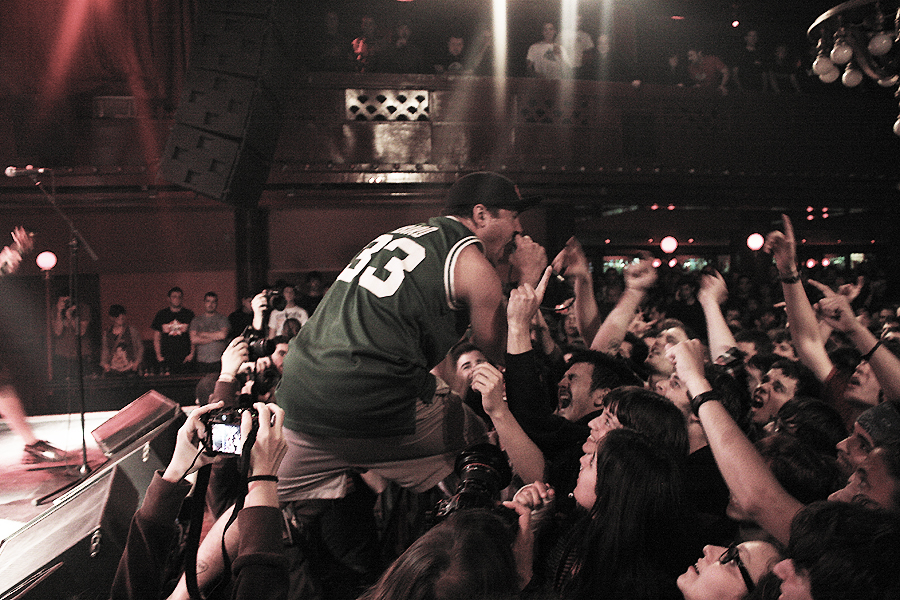
Singer Nuno Pereira performing at A Wilhelm Scream show

By 1999 and 2000, the youth crew revival was in decline, with Ten Yard Fight, In My Eyes and Floorpunch all disbanding. As a reaction against the homogeneity and simplicity that scene had developed, Ten Yard Fight guitarist Tim Cossar and the band's roadie Wesley Eisold formed American Nightmare. Although still musically rooted in the youth crew revival, the band's negative, poetic lyrics of self-loathing were inspired by groups like the Smiths. American Nightmare's influence was apparent promptly in their home of Boston, then expanded nationally with the release of their 2001 debut album Background Music, being followed by a wave bands including Ceremony, Ruiner, Modern Life Is War, the Hope Conspiracy and Killing the Dream. A reaction against this movement also took place, which began with Mental, who were quickly followed by Have Heart. Have Heart's success led to the rise in popularity of other positive hardcore groups like Champion, Verse and Sinking Ships, and the rise in prominence of Bridge 9 Records. In an AllMusic review, Greg Prato wrote about the label's band Energy that "While you wouldn't go quite as far as calling Energy "a hardcore boy band," the group's leanings toward the mainstream are undeniable throughout Invasions of the Mind. Friends Stand United (FSU) formed in Boston in the 1980s in an attempt to expel neo-Nazis from the scene. By the early 2000s, there were FSU chapters in Philadelphia, Chicago, Arizona, Los Angeles, Seattle, upstate New York and New Jersey, and they were considered to have about 200 members. The Federal Bureau of Investigation eventually classified FSU as a street gang, which used violent methods and repeatedly assault people at hardcore shows and on Boston streets. In conjunction with the gang activities, James eventually did time in jail for extortion.

With the increased popularity of punk rock in the mid-1990s and the 2000s, additional hardcore bands signed with major record labels. In 2001, New York's H_{2}O released the album Go on MCA, but it failed at bringing the band big success, and fell flat with longtime fans. In 2002, AFI signed to DreamWorks Records but changed their sound considerably for its successful major label debut Sing the Sorrow. Chicago's Rise Against were signed by Geffen Records, and three of its releases on the label were certified platinum by the RIAA. Like AFI, Rise Against gradually removed elements of hardcore from their music, culminating with 2008's Appeal to Reason, which lacked the intensity found in their earlier albums. United Kingdom band Gallows were signed to Warner Bros. Records for £1 million. Their major label debut Grey Britain was more aggressive than their previous material, and the band was subsequently dropped from the label. The success of the band led to other British hardcore acts of the time gain notability like the Ghost of a Thousand and Heights. Los Angeles band the Bronx briefly appeared on Island Def Jam Music Group for the release of their 2006 self-titled album, which was named one of the top 40 albums of the year by Spin magazine. They appeared in the Darby Crash biopic What We Do Is Secret, playing members of Black Flag. In 2007, Toronto's Fucked Up appeared on MTV Live Canada, where they were introduced as "Effed Up". During the performance of its song "Baiting the Public", the majority of the audience was moshing, which caused $2000 in damages to the set. Fucked Up went on to win the 2009 Polaris Music Prize for the album The Chemistry of Common Life.

Australian hardcore also took off during this time with bands like Miles Away, Break Even, 50 Lions (formed in 2005), and Iron Mind (formed in 2006). The genre was played on the national Triple J network on the short.fast.loud program. Australian labels that released hardcore music include Broken Hive Records, Resist Records and UNFD Records.

=== 2010s ===
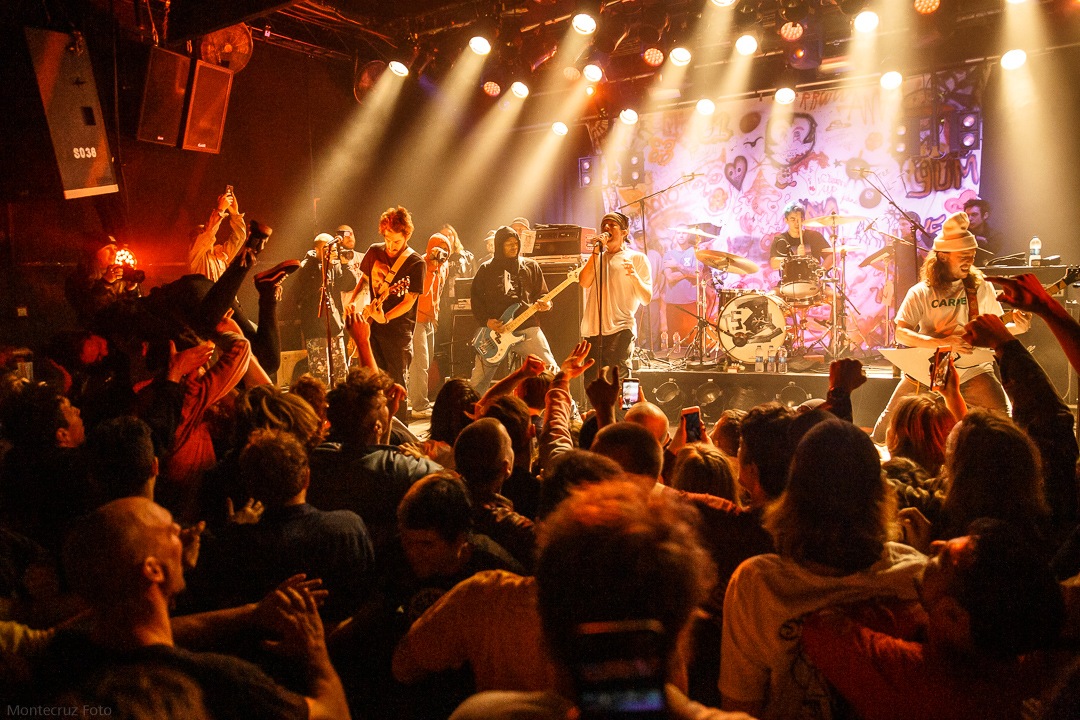
Turnstile have been one of the most prominent bands in the hardcore scene since their 2010 formation.

With many bands breaking up in the late 2000s, accompanied by a general sense of sonic homogeny in the hardcore genre, the 2010s became a decade of experimentation and fusion in hardcore music that was fueled by access to streaming. Drawing from and collaborating with elements of other eras and genres, hardcore grew as music styles intersected. For instance, bands like Trash Talk began collaborating with artists like Tyler, the Creator and his hip-hop collective Odd Future. Meanwhile, bands like Fury, Fiddlehead, and Give garnered a great deal of attention on an underground level for their lyricism and diverse sounds. Other prominent bands, like Title Fight and Basement brought elements of shoegaze and '90s noise rock into the hardcore genre.

Trapped Under Ice were one of the most prominent bands in hardcore in the early 2010s. The band's second album Big Kiss Goodnight (2011) changing the sonic landscape of hardcore at the time, with Stereogum writer Tom Breiham stating in a 2023 article that "it's been years since we've gotten a new Trapped Under Ice song, but that band's influence looms large over the entire hardcore landscape today." However, in 2013, the band suddenly disbanded, disheartened by the amount of interest in them by the music industry. In the meantime, its members focused on their other projects Angel Dust, Diamond Youth, Down to Nothing and Turnstile. Angel Dust's embrace of styles like indie pop, and Turnstile's of 1960s surf music and 1990s alternative rock led to them, too, becoming formidable in the follow decade.

In the early to mid-2010s, a number of British hardcore punk bands began being represented as members of a new musical movement dubbed the New Wave of British Hardcore, a term coined by Adam Malik from the Essence Records. Bands who are part of the movement generally take influence from '80s Boston and New York hardcore bands. Bands associated with the movement include Arms Race, Violent Reaction, Big Cheese, Higher Power, Perspex Flesh, Mob Rules, the Flex and Blind Authority. Some bands such as Rapture, Violent Reaction and Payday are straight edge.

During this time, Muslim hardcore bands have emerged in the U.S., Canada, Pakistan, and Indonesia. The development of Muslim hardcore has been traced to the impact of a 2010 film Taqwacore, a documentary about the Muslim hardcore scene. Bands include the Kominas from Boston, the all-girl Secret Trial Five from Toronto, Al Thawra (The Power) from Chicago "and even a few bands out in Pakistan and Indonesia." Partly due to developments in digital communications, there was a rise in interaction between hardcore scenes in different places and subgenres, particularly in Europe. In September 2017, Bandcamp Daily wrote that Fluff Fest, which has been held in the Czech Republic since 2000 and features an international lineup of independent bands ranging in style from crust punk to screamo, "has established itself as the main DIY hardcore punk event in Europe".

During the decade, many hardcore bands also had considerable chart recognition. Turnstile signed to Roadrunner Records in 2017 and released their sophomore album Time & Space in 2018, which reached number one on the Billboard Heatseekers chart. Gouge Away, formed in 2012 in Fort Lauderdale, Florida, saw their record Burnt Sugar peak at 46 on Billboard Independent Albums. Code Orange, who formed in Pittsburgh in 2008, their 2014 sophomore album I Am King reached number 96 on the Billboard 200, and its follow up, 2017's Forever peaked and number 62. Kentucky hardcore band Knocked Loose formed in 2013 and released their debut album Laugh Tracks in 2016, which peaked at number 163 on the Billboard 200. Its follow-up A Different Shade of Blue was released in 2019 and peaked at number 26. Many of these bands were a part of wave of bands gaining recognition for harkening back to the metallic hardcore sound of bands from the 1990s, which included Vein.fm, Code Orange, Knocked Loose, Varials, Jesus Piece, Counterparts and Kublai Khan.

Hardcore in the late 2010s saw a significant growth of the scene to involve bands taking influence from styles generally disassociated with it, such as industrial, heavy metal, post-punk and nu metal. Around this time, mainstream rappers began to associate themselves with the hardcore scene. Playboi Carti included a performance from a hardcore show as the front cover for his 2018 album Die Lit, Denzel Curry collaborated with Bad Brains and Fucked Up in 2019 and rap groups Suicideboys and City Morgue were joined on tour by hardcore bands Turnstile and Trash Talk. Rappers Wicca Phase Springs Eternal and Ghostemane even began playing music by performing in hardcore bands. In September 2019, rap group Injury Reserve released a collaborative track with Code Orange and JPEGMafia.

In 2019, the highly influential 2000s Boston hardcore band Have Heart reunited for performances in four different locations after a ten-year breakup. One of these performances was outside the Worcester Palladium in Massachusetts, which drew around 10,000 attendees, making it the largest standalone hardcore show in history.

=== 2020s ===
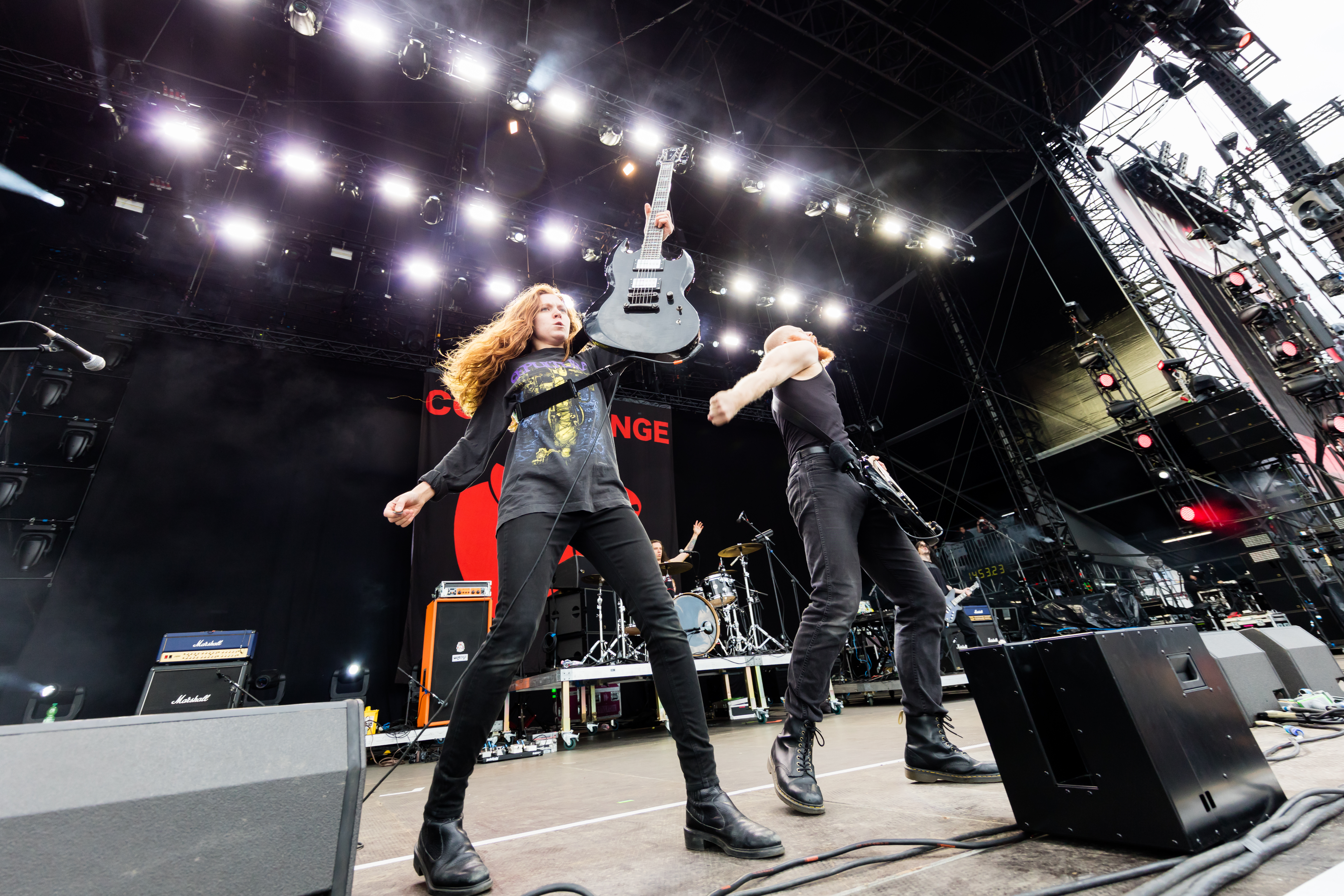
Code Orange's Underneath (2020) achieved significant chart success and universal critic acclaim.

The 2020 COVID-19 pandemic made the prospect of playing live music difficult. This brought about a heavy digital shift in independent music, where many bands began performing livestream shows for fans until physical shows could occur. With social distancing limiting the availability of physical interactions, the hardcore community relied on social media activity, podcasting, zines, and video content to stay connected virtually. During this period, a number of hardcore releases gained attention from the media and online that surpassed the genre's usual scope, namely Code Orange's Underneath (2020), Higher Power's 27 Miles Underwater (2021) and Turnstile's Glow On (2021). Underneath topped the UK Rock & Metal Albums, reached number two on the US Top Tastemaker Albums chart, and received universal critical acclaim. Higher Power were hailed by Metal Hammer as "the band redefining hardcore for a new generation", and voted the most likely UK band to break into the mainstream in a Revolver fan poll. However, Glow On triggered an international explosion in popularity of the genre, and allowed for the subsequent success of bands including Zulu, High Vis and Speed. Glow On also received universal critical acclaim, peaked at number two on the UK Rock & Metal Albums, and number thirty on the mainline Billboard 200 chart. A podcast published the New York Times credited a number of viral videos of live performances by hardcore bands as contributing to the popularity, including Sunami's live debut in San Jose on October 26, 2019, Hate5six's July 03, 2021 video of Mindforce performing at Underground Arts in Philadelphia and Turnstile's performance in Oxnard on August 29, 2021. The Financial Times named London's Chubby and the Gang and Detroit's the Armed as two of the most commercially successful groups of this wave.

By 2023, the most prominent style in hardcore was its fusion with alternative rock, fronted by Turnstile, Angel Dust, Scowl and Higher Power. Spin magazine credited Militarie Gun, High Vis and Scowl as bands "help[ing] to breathe life back into both" alternative rock and hardcore. In a 2023 episode his podcast Violent Treatment, former Revolver editor Eli Enis called this style "pop-hardcore". As a style, PopMatters writer Ethan Stewart credited the album as building upon the alternative metal-meets-New York-style hardcore style of 1990s bands including Snapcase or Crown of Thornz. BrooklynVegan editor Andrew Sacher traced its popularity as slowly growing since around 2008 with the release of Cold World's Dedicated to Babies Who Came Feet First and Fucked Up's The Chemistry of Common Life and through 2010s releases by Trapped Under Ice, Title Fight and Trash Talk. Of the style, Militarie Gun vocalist Ian Shelton said it was reviving "the original intent of hardcore... instead of this formulaic thing" citing the Minutemen, Bad Brains, and Hüsker Dü as its forefathers. Sacher also noted the grungegaze of Narrow Head and Fleshwater as interconnected with this wave.

The southern San Francisco Bay Area scene gained particular prevalence in the 2020s, based in Santa Cruz and San Jose. The first of these bands was Gulch, who formed in 2016, and were later followed by Scowl, Drain and Sunami. As lockdowns began to ease, many of the bands in this scene began to put on "guerilla shows", such as one that took place on June 19, 2021, in San Jose featuring Sunami, Gulch, Drain, Scowl, Xibalba and Maya Over Eyes, which had an attendance of around 2,000. Gulch performed their final live performance at Sound and Fury Festival on July 31, 2022, at the peak of their popularity.

== Influence ==
Hardcore punk has spawned a number of subgenres, fusion genres and derivative forms. Key derivatives like post-hardcore, emo, and skate punk have had a major impact on alternative music. Other subgenres include D-beat, melodic hardcore, crust punk, and thrashcore. Fusion genres include crossover thrash, grindcore, and metalcore, all of which fuse hardcore punk with extreme metal.

Metallica and Slayer, pioneers of the heavy metal subgenre thrash metal, were influenced by a number of hardcore bands. Metallica's cover album Garage Inc. included covers of two Discharge and three Misfits songs, while Slayer's cover album Undisputed Attitude consisted of covers of predominately hardcore punk bands.

The Washington state band Melvins, aside from their influence on grunge, helped create what would be known as sludge metal, which is also a combination between Black Sabbath-style music and hardcore punk. This genre developed during the early 1990s, in the Southern United States (particularly in the New Orleans metal scene). Some of the pioneering bands of sludge metal were Eyehategod, Crowbar, Down, Buzzov*en, Acid Bath and Corrosion of Conformity. Later, bands such as Isis and Neurosis, with similar influences, created a style that relies mostly on ambience and atmosphere that was eventually named atmospheric sludge metal or post-metal.

=== Fusion and subgenres ===
==== Rapcore ====
Rapcore is a fusion genre, combining elements of hardcore punk and hip-hop. The two genres have a shared history, originating from oppressed, marginalized and disenfranchised young people, despite generally having distinctly separate ethno-cultural roots. During the 1980s, Chuck D, of hip-hop group Public Enemy, was inspired by Black Flag vocalist Henry Rollins, while Beastie Boys began as a hardcore band, before transitioning into hip-hop despite retaining their hardcore influence. Furthermore, many bands in the New York hardcore scene at this time began incorporating elements of hip-hop.

Rapcore was pioneered acts including Biohazard, Dog Eat Dog, downset., E.Town Concrete and Every Day Life. Notable subsequent acts include Deez Nuts, Fever 333 and Stray From the Path.

==== D-beat ====
D-beat (also known as discore or kängpunk) is a hardcore punk subgenre, developed in the early 1980s by imitators of the band Discharge, after whom the genre is named, as well as a drum beat characteristic of this subgenre. The bands Discharge and the Varukers are pioneers of the D-beat genre. Robbie Mackey of Pitchfork Media described D-beat as "hardcore drumming set against breakneck riffage and unintelligible howls about anarchy, working-stiffs-as-rats, and banding together to, you know, fight."

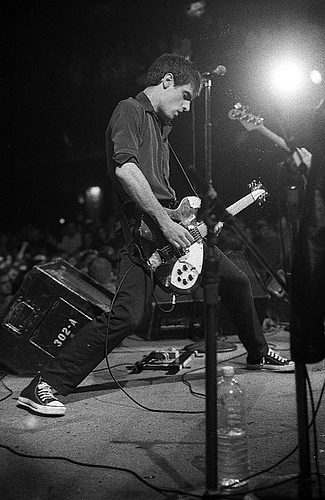
Guy Picciotto of Rites of Spring and Fugazi

==== Emo and post-hardcore ====
The 1980s saw the development of post-hardcore, which took the hardcore style in a more complex and dynamic direction, with a focus on singing rather than screaming. The post-hardcore style first took shape in Chicago, with bands such as Big Black, the Effigies and Naked Raygun. It later developed in Washington, D.C., within the community of bands on Ian MacKaye's Dischord Records, with bands such as Fugazi, the Nation of Ulysses, and Jawbox. The style extended until the late 2000s. The mid-'80s Washington, D.C., Revolution Summer movement and post-hardcore scene would also see the birth of emo. Guy Picciotto formed Rites of Spring in 1984, breaking free of hardcore's self-imposed boundaries in favor of melodic guitars, varied rhythms, and deeply personal, impassioned lyrics dealing with nostalgia, romantic bitterness, and poetic desperation. Other D.C. bands such as Gray Matter, Beefeater, Fire Party, Dag Nasty, also became connected to this movement. The style was dubbed "emo", "emo-core", or "post-harDCore" (in reference to one of the names given to the Washington, D.C. hardcore scene).

==== Thrashcore and powerviolence ====
Often confused with crossover thrash and sometimes thrash metal is thrashcore. Thrashcore (also known as fastcore) is a subgenre of hardcore punk that emerged in the early 1980s. It is essentially sped-up hardcore punk, with bands often using blast beats. Just as hardcore punk groups distinguished themselves from their punk rock predecessors by their greater intensity and aggression, thrashcore groups (often identified simply as "thrash") sought to play at breakneck tempos that would radicalize the innovations of hardcore. Early American thrashcore groups included Cryptic Slaughter (Santa Monica), D.R.I. (Houston), Ludichrist, (Long Island), Septic Death (Boise) and Siege (Weymouth, Massachusetts). Thrashcore spun off into powerviolence, another raw and dissonant subgenre of hardcore punk. Other notable powerviolence bands include early Ceremony, Man is the Bastard and Spazz.

==== Grindcore ====
Grindcore is an extreme genre of music that began the early to mid-1980s. Grindcore music relies on heavy metal instrumentation and eventually changed into a genre similar to death metal. Grindcore vocals, according to AllMusic, range "from high-pitched shrieks to low, throat-shredding growls and barks". Grindcore also features blast beats; according to Adam MacGregor of Dusted, "the blast-beat generally comprises a repeated, sixteenth-note figure played at a very fast tempo, and divided uniformly among the kick drum, snare and ride, crash, or hi-hat cymbal." The band Napalm Death invented the grindcore genre; their debut album Scum was described by AllMusic as "perhaps the most representative example of" grindcore.

==== Beatdown hardcore ====
Beatdown hardcore (also known as heavy hardcore, brutal hardcore, toughguy, and moshcore) is a style of hardcore punk and heavy metal which has deep, hoarse vocals, down-tuned guitars, blast beats, and slow breakdowns. More heavy metal-influenced than traditional hardcore punk, Rotting Out, Strife, Shai Hulud, Madball and Hatebreed all are beatdown hardcore bands.

==== Metalcore ====
Metalcore is a fusion genre that merges hardcore punk with extreme metal. Metalcore has screaming, growling, heavy guitar riffs, breakdowns, and double bass drumming. Heavy metal–hardcore punk hybrids arose in the mid-1980s and would also radicalize the innovations of hardcore as the two genres and their ideologies intertwined noticeably. The term has been used to refer to bands that were not purely hardcore nor purely metal such as Earth Crisis, Integrity and Hogan's Heroes. During the 2000s, there was a metalcore explosion and bands like Bullet for My Valentine, Killswitch Engage, Atreyu, Shadows Fall, and As I Lay Dying all had some popularity.

==== Grunge ====
In the mid-1980s, bands such as Melvins, Flipper and Green River developed a sludgy, "aggressive sound that melded the slower tempos of heavy metal with the intensity of hardcore," creating an alternative rock subgenre known as grunge. Grunge evolved from the local Seattle punk rock scene, and it was inspired by bands such as the Fartz, 10 Minute Warning and the Accüsed. Grunge fuses elements of hardcore and heavy metal, although some bands performed with more emphasis on one or the other. Grunge's key guitar influences included Black Flag and the Melvins. Black Flag's 1984 record My War, on which the band combined heavy metal with their traditional sound, made a strong impact in Seattle.

==== Nintendocore ====
Nintendocore, another musical style, fuses hardcore with video game music, chiptune, and 8-bit music.

==== Sludgecore ====
Eyehategod formed in Harvey, Louisiana in 1988 and is credited with originating a new style—New Orleans hardcore-edged sludge. Another viewpoint is that New Orleans was the birthplace of the sludgecore movement, with Eyehategod being given the most credit for it. Sludgecore combines sludge metal with hardcore punk, and possesses a slow pace, a low guitar tuning, and a grinding dirge-like feel. Bands regarded as sludgecore include Acid Bath, Eyehategod, and Soilent Green, and all three formed in Louisiana. Crowbar formed in 1991 and mixed "detuned, lethargic sludged-out metal with hardcore and southern elements". According to rock journalist Steve Huey writing in AllMusic, Eyehategod was a sludge metal band that became part of the "Southern sludgecore scene". This scene also included Crowbar and Down, with all three bands being influenced by Black Flag, Black Sabbath, and the Melvins. Some of these bands incorporated Southern rock influences.

== See also ==
- List of hardcore punk bands
- List of hardcore punk genres

== Bibliography ==
- Hurchalla, George (2005). Going Underground: American Punk 1979–1992. Zuo Press.
- Manley, Frank (1993). Smash the State: A Discography of Canadian Punk, 1977–92. No Exit. ISBN 0-9696631-0-2.
- Glasper, Ian (2004). Burning Britain: The History of UK Punk, 1980–1984. Cherry Red. ISBN 9781901447248.
- Glasper, Ian (2009). Trapped in a Scene: UK Hardcore 1985–1989. Cherry Red Books. ISBN 9781901447613.
