= Gang Green discography =

- Studio albums: 4
- Extended plays: 6
- Live albums: 1
- Compilation albums: 4

This is the discography of Gang Green, an American hardcore punk band from Boston. The band has released four studio albums, six extended plays, and one live album.

== Studio albums ==
Year	Title	Label
1986	Another Wasted Night	Taang! Records
1987	You Got It	Roadrunner Records
1989	Older... Budweiser	Roadrunner Records
1997	Another Case of Brewtality	Taang! Records

== Live albums ==
Year	Title	Label
1990	Can't LIVE Without It	Roadrunner Records

== Compilations ==
Year	Title	Label
1991	King of Bands	Roadrunner Records
1991	Another Wasted Night	Taang! Records
1997	Preschool	Taang! Records
2006	The Taang Years	Golf Records
2023	We'll Give It to You	Dissonance Productions

== EPs ==
Year	Title	Label
1984	Sold Out 7"	Taang! Records
1985	Drunk and Disorderly 10"	Deluxe Music
1985	P.M.R.C. Sucks 12"	Him Records
1985	Skate to Hell 7"	Taang! Records
1988	I81B4U	Roadrunner Records
1997	Back & Gacked	Taang! Records

== Various artists compilation tracks ==
- This Is Boston, Not L.A. (1982) Modern Method
  - "Snob" – "Lie Lie" – "I Don't Know" – "Rabies" – "Narrow Mind" – "Kill a Commie" – "Have Fun"
- Unsafe at Any Speed (1982) Modern Method
  - "Selfish"
- Thrasher Skaterock Vol. 3 (1985) Thrasher/High Speed
  - "Skate to Hell"
- Mr. Beautiful Presents: All Hard (1985, Modern Method)
  - "Let's Drink Some Beer"
- American Hardcore: The History of American Punk Rock 1980–1986 [Soundtrack] (2006, Rhino)
  - "Kill a Commie"
