= Chris Doherty =

American musician

- Genres: Hardcore punk; crossover thrash; skate punk; speed metal
- Occupations: Singer; songwriter
- Years active: 1980-present
- Labels: Taang!; Roadrunner
- Member of: Gang Green
- Formerly of: Jerry’s Kids; Hamerd; Klover

Chris Doherty (born 1965 in Braintree, Massachusetts) is an American musician best known as the founder of hardcore punk band Gang Green. He graduated from Braintree High School in 1983. The lone constant in the lineup, lead singer/guitarist Doherty has remained with Gang Green, off and on, for more than two decades. He formed the first incarnation of Gang Green in 1982, the second in 1985, and a third in 1997. They still continue to play live shows in the Boston area.

== Biography ==
=== 1980s ===
Doherty formed the first incarnation of Gang Green at the age of 15, in 1980. The group contributed seven tracks to the This Is Boston, Not L.A. compilation in 1982, and one track to the follow-up Unsafe at Any Speed EP, also in 1982. In 1983, Gang Green disbanded as Doherty had joined punk band Jerry's Kids in 1982, and later moved on to Stranglehold and the ska band the Cheapskates. Following stints in those three bands Doherty reemerged with an all new Gang Green lineup in 1984; they later released their debut album Another Wasted Night in 1986.

In 1987 Doherty and Gang Green signed with Roadrunner Records, releasing their second album You Got It in 1987, and an EP I81B4U in 1988, and Older... Budweiser 1989.

=== 1990s and 2000s ===
In 1990, Gang Green was dropped by Roadrunner and played their played their final show on December 16, 1991, at The Dome, London, England. Doherty decided to step away from music during this time due to the birth of he and his wife’s daughter and began working as a telemarketer. In 1993, he and his wife divorced with her and their daughter moving to Atlanta Georgia, Doherty then moved to Westerly, Rhode Island where he spent most of 1994, partying.

In late 1994, Doherty was approached by Mercury Records, in search of a punk-rock act for its roster, and asked him to do a record. Doherty then formed and fronted Klover, a punk band which released one album, Feel Lucky Punk?, in 1995. After Klover broke up, he formed another band, Hamerd, before reforming the current version of Gang Green in 1997.

Gang Green toured Europe and the U.S. extensively in 1997 and 1998. Soon after Doherty moved from Boston to Cincinnati and in the early 2000s, Gang Green played only once or twice a year in Boston and New York. The group continued to sporadically tour throughout the 2000s.

=== 2010s ===
In 2013, Doherty teamed up with local Cincinnati music veterans Chris Donelly, Dale Kishbaugh and Sean Boyle to bring back Gang Green. This lineup toured the US and Europe throughout the 2010s.

On October 31, 2018, Doherty suffered a major stroke that affected both his heart and brain and left him paralyzed on his left side, resulting in him going under successful brain surgery. 10 weeks after the suffering the stroke Gang Greens former manager Alec Peters scheduled a benefit show titled "Not a Wasted Night Out" which took place on January 11, 2019, and included performances by Slapshot, Tree, F.U.s, Evan Dando of The Lemonheads, The Outlets, and Springa of SSD.

=== 2020s ===
After several years of physical rehabilitation Doherty returned to the stage with Gang Green for the first time in nearly four years on October 1, 2022 at the Midway Cafe in Boston.

In 2023, Doherty would start doing shows again, embarking on a world tour from July 21–30 on the east coast, then August in Europe.

== Discography ==
=== Gang Green ===
- Another Wasted Night (1986)
- You Got It (1987)
- I81B4U (EP) (1988)
- Can't Live Without It (1988)
- Older... Budweiser (1989)
- Another Case of Brewtality (1997)

=== Jerry’s Kids ===
- Is This My World? (1983)

=== Klover ===
Feel Lucky Punk? (1995)
