= King of Bands =

Compilation album by Gang Green
- Released: December 1991
- Recorded: 1985 – September, 1991
- Genre: Hardcore punk, crossover thrash
- Length: 33:26
- Label: Roadrunner
- Producer: Ross Humphrey, Alec Peters, Thom Moore, Daniel Rey, Tom Soares

Gang Green chronology
| Can't LIVE Without It (1990) | King of Bands (1991) | Back & Gacked EP (1997) |

King of Bands is a compilation album by American hardcore punk band Gang Green, released in 1991.

It was released in December, 1991 on Roadrunner Records and contained two newly recorded tracks from two-fifths of the line up who had appeared on the previous album.

Josh Pappe had got married and was replaced by Kevin Brooks on bass. Fritz Ericson had retired and was replaced by Mike Lucantonio on guitar. Brian Betzger left to start a pool hall and was replaced in a touring capacity by Walter Gustafson – the drummer in the band who left in 1984. Gustafson left before this album and was replaced once again, by Brian Betzger.

The material is evenly gleaned from previous albums: three tracks from Another Wasted Night, two from You Got It, two from the EP I81B4U, and three from their last studio album, Older... Budweiser.

The album's opening and closing tracks were newly recorded by the new line-up in September, 1991. These two songs were the last new songs to be created by Doherty and Co until 1997, when an EP, Back & Gacked was swiftly followed by a new album, Another Case Of Brewtality and a re-issue of their pre-Another Wasted Night material, Preschool – all on their original independent label, Taang.

== Track listing ==
All tracks written by Chris Doherty, except where noted.

1. "Thunder" – 3:05
2. "Alcohol" (Chuck Stilphen, Doherty) – 2:06
3. "We'll Give It To You" – 3:13
4. "Bartender" (Joe Gittleman, Doherty) – 3:18
5. "Ballad" (Fritz Ericson, Doherty) – 2:30
6. "Fuck In A" – 0:52
7. "Just One Bullet" (Doherty, Betzger) – 3:06
8. "Another Wasted Night" – 2:28
9. "Another Bomb" – 2:28
10. "Put Her On Top" – 3:43
11. "Church Of Fun" (Doherty, Betzger) – 3:12
12. "Rub It In Your Face" – 3:34

== Personnel ==
- Chris Doherty – vocals, guitar – all tracks
- Chuck Stilphen – guitar – tracks 2, 6, and 8
- Fritz Ericson – guitar – tracks 3, 4, 5, 7, 9, 10, and 11
- Mike Lucantonio – guitar – tracks 1 and 12
- Glen Stilphen – bass – tracks 2, 6, and 8
- Joe Gittleman – bass – tracks 3, 4, 5, 7, 9, 10, and 11
- Kevin Brooks – bass – tracks 1 and 12
- Brian Betzger – drums – all tracks
- Recorded 1985 – September, 1991
- Produced by
  - Ross Humphrey – tracks 1, 6, and 12
  - Alec Peters – tracks 2 and 8
  - Thom Moore – tracks 3 and 9
  - Daniel Rey – tracks 4 and 10
  - Tom Soares – tracks 5, 7, and 11
