= American Hardcore (film) =

2006 documentary film by Paul Rachman

- Movie poster
- Directed by: Paul Rachman
- Written by: Steven Blush
- Produced by: Steven Blush; Paul Rachman
- Starring: Bad Brains; Black Flag; Circle Jerks; D.O.A.; Minor Threat
- Cinematography: Paul Rachman
- Edited by: Paul Rachman
- Distributed by: Sony Pictures Classics
- Release date: September 22, 2006
- Running time: 100 minutes
- Language: English

American Hardcore: The History of American Punk Rock 1980–1986 is a 2006 documentary film directed and produced by Paul Rachman and written by Steven Blush. It is based on the 2001 book American Hardcore: A Tribal History also written by Blush. It had its world premiere at the 2006 Sundance Film Festival and was released on September 22, 2006 on a limited basis by Sony Pictures Classics. The film features some early pioneers of the hardcore punk music scene including Bad Brains, Black Flag, D.O.A., Minor Threat, Minutemen, SSD, and others. It was released on DVD by Sony Pictures Home Entertainment on February 20, 2007.

== Synopsis ==
The film addresses the birth and evolution of hardcore punk rock from 1978 to 1986 (although the packaging says 1980-1986). The documentary boasts extensive underground footage shot during the height of the hardcore movement. It features exclusive interviews with early hardcore punk music artists from bands such as Black Flag, Minor Threat, Bad Brains, and many more.

== Interviewees ==
- Jonathan Anastas formerly of D.Y.S. and Slapshot
- Phil Anselmo of Pantera and Down
- Brian Baker of Bad Religion, formerly of Minor Threat and Dag Nasty
- Dicky Barrett of Mighty Mighty Bosstones, formerly of Impact Unit and The Cheapskates
- Vic Bondi formerly of Articles of Faith
- Dave Brockie of Death Piggy (which would later form into the band Gwar), formerly of X-Cops, and the Dave Brockie Experience
- Curtis Casella, owner and founder of Taang! Records
- Brandon Cruz of Dr. Know (band), formerly of the Dead Kennedys
- Bob Cenci of Gang Green and Jerry's Kids
- Steve "Mugger" Corbin, former Black Flag roadie and formerly of Nig-Heist
- Mike Dean of Corrosion of Conformity
- Dave Dictor of MDC
- Chris Doherty of Gang Green, formerly of Jerry's Kids
- Harley Flanagan founding member of the Cro-Mags
- Flea of the Red Hot Chili Peppers, formerly of Fear
- Flipper members Bruce Loose, Ted Falconi and Steve DePace
- Greg Ginn formerly of Black Flag
- Jack Grisham of T.S.O.L.
- Brett Gurewitz of Bad Religion, owner of punk rock record label Epitaph Records
- H.R., Dr. Know and Darryl Jenifer of Bad Brains
- Greg Hetson of Bad Religion and the Circle Jerks
- Ken Inouye of Marginal Man
- John Joseph of the Cro-Mags
- Joe Keithley of D.O.A.
- Alec Mackaye formerly of The Faith
- Ian Mackaye of Fugazi, formerly of The Teen Idles and Minor Threat
- Paul Mahern of Zero Boys
- Moby formerly of the Vatican Commandos and, briefly, Flipper
- Keith Morris of the Circle Jerks, formerly of Black Flag
- Duff McKagan, formerly of The Fartz and Guns N' Roses
- Reed Mullin of Corrosion of Conformity
- Rev. Hank Peirce former roadie for Slapshot, Corrosion of Conformity and Uniform Choice
- Kira Roessler formerly of Black Flag
- Henry Rollins of Rollins Band, formerly of Black Flag and State of Alert
- Kevin Seconds of 7 Seconds
- Dave Smalley of Down by Law, formerly of D.Y.S., ALL, and Dag Nasty
- Bobby Steele of The Undead and The Misfits
- Dave "Springa" Spring formerly of SS Decontrol
- Vinnie Stigma of Agnostic Front
- Mike Watt formerly of the Minutemen and Firehose
- Perry Webb of Culturcide
- Todd Youth of The Chelsea Smiles, formerly of Agnostic Front, Warzone and Murphy's Law
- Mike Patton of Middle Class, Elysian Fields, Trotsky Icepick and Jeff Atta of Middle Class

== Production ==
The film was shot and edited over five years with many clips of 80s hardcore bands being sent in by the bands themselves. Some of the footage was shot by director Paul Rachman in the 80s.

Many of the interviews were actually done in both Paul Rachman's and Steven Blush's apartments in different areas to make it seem like they were done in different locations.

The film also features the photography of Edward Colver notably and principally, and his shot of Danny Spira from Wasted Youth covered in blood was used for the book cover.

== Reception ==
On the review aggregator website Rotten Tomatoes, 72% of 60 critics' reviews are positive. The website's consensus reads: "American Hardcore is an informative and highly entertaining look at the heyday of punk in the early 1980s." Metacritic, which uses a weighted average, assigned the film a score of 69 out of 100, based on 21 critics, indicating "generally favorable" reviews.

== Soundtrack ==
American Hardcore OST

Studio album by Various artists
- Released: 10 October 2006
- Genres: Hardcore punk, thrashcore
- Length: 37:01
- Label: Rhino Records

Professional ratings
Review scores
Source	Rating
Allmusic	4.5/5 stars

=== Track listing ===
1. Nervous Breakdown – Black Flag
2. Out of Vogue – Middle Class
3. Pay To Cum – Bad Brains
4. Fucked Up Ronnie – D.O.A.
5. Red Tape – Circle Jerks
6. Filler – Minor Threat
7. I Remember – MDC
8. Nic Fit – Untouchables
9. Kill a Commie – Gang Green
10. Boston Not L.A. – The Freeze
11. Straight Jacket – Jerry's Kids
12. Boiling Point – SSD
13. Who Are You/Time To Die – Void
14. Came Without Warning – Scream
15. Enemy for Life – YDI
16. Runnin' Around – D.R.I.
17. Don't Tread On Me – Cro-Mags
18. Friend or Foe – Negative Approach
19. Bad Attitude – Articles of Faith
20. Think For Me – Die Kreuzen
21. I Hate Sports – 7 Seconds
22. Brickwall – Big Boys
23. I Was a Teenage Fuckup – Really Red
24. I Hate Children – The Adolescents
25. My Mind's Diseased – Battalion of Saints
26. Ha Ha Ha – Flipper
27. Victim In Pain – Agnostic Front

== Bibliography ==
- Blush, Steven (2001). American Hardcore: A Tribal History. Second ed., 2010. Feral House. ISBN 9781932595895.
