= Preschool (album) =

Compilation album by Gang Green
- Released: October 7, 1997
- Recorded: July, 1981 – March, 1983; Boston
- Genre: Hardcore punk
- Length: 14:01
- Label: Taang Records
- Producer: Lou Giordano

Gang Green chronology
Another Case of Brewtality (1997)	Preschool (1997)

Professional ratings
Review scores
Source	Rating
AllMusic	2.5/5 stars

Preschool is a compilation album of early material from American hardcore punk band Gang Green.

It was recorded between 1981 and 1983 and was originally released on Taang Records before the band disbanded, reformed for the Alcohol 7-inch and Another Wasted Night LP, disbanded again, and reformed for their breakthrough album, You Got It.

It contains material previously released on the Sold Out 7-inch EP, and two compilations – This Is Boston, Not L.A. and Unsafe At Any Speed.

The original catalogue number for the Sold Out 7-inch was "TAANG01" – as this was now out-of-print, Taang released this compilation with the same catalogue number. All tracks featured the original recording three-piece line up of Chris Doherty, Mike Dean, and Bill Manley.

Dean later joined the Marines, managed to discharge himself and joined Jerry's Kids, another Boston band. Manley went to live in Hawaii. The band broke up until interest in all their early material surfaced and a new line-up re-entered the fray in 1984.

This album was released on the same day as their first full-length studio album since 1989, Another Case Of Brewtality.

== Overview ==
The early incarnation of Gang Green grew up with the likes of SSD, and Negative FX – listening to music such as British band, Discharge. It was hardly a surprise, then, that they came out with super-fast, brutal hardcore punk which caught the eye of such punk luminaries of the time like Black Flag, The Misfits, and Dead Kennedys.

These songs were still part of their live set right into the late 90s. Live renditions which were laid to record, on Can't LIVE Without It in 1990, include "Sold Out", "Have Fun", and "Rabies".

== Track listing ==
All tracks written by Gang Green.

1. "Sold Out" – 2:04
2. "Terrorize" – 0:48
3. "Snob" – 0:28
4. "Lie Lie" – 0:37
5. "I Don't Know" – 1:03
6. "Rabies" – 1:27
7. "Narrow Mind" – 0:44
8. "Kill A Commie" – 1:08
9. "Have Fun" – 0:54
10. "Selfish" – 4:48

== Personnel ==
- Chris Doherty – vocals, guitar
- Bill Manley – bass
- Mike Dean – drums
- Recorded between July, 1981 – March, 1983 at various places in Boston, Massachusetts
- Produced and mixed by Lou Giordano
