= Zen Wrapped in Karma Dipped in Chocolate =

2009 book by Brad Warner

Zen Wrapped in Karma Dipped in Chocolate: A Trip Through Death, Sex, Divorce, and Spiritual Celebrity in Search of the True Dharma
- Author: Brad Warner
- Cover artist: Johnny Kraft
- Language: American English
- Subject: Sōtō Zen Buddhism,
- Published: 2009 (New World Library)
- Publication place: United States
- Media type: Print
- Pages: 224
- ISBN: 1-57731-559-6
- Preceded by: Sit Down and Shut Up
- Followed by: Sex, Sin, and Zen

Zen Wrapped in Karma Dipped in Chocolate: A Trip Through Death, Sex, Divorce, and Spiritual Celebrity in Search of the True Dharma (often referred to simply as Zen Wrapped in Karma Dipped in Chocolate) is a book written by Zen priest and punk rock bassist Brad Warner. The book chronicles Warner's 2007, the year in which Zen helped Warner handle his mother and grandmother's deaths, the dissolution of his marriage, and the end of his career.

== The title ==
Brad Warner has said that the title was inspired by a yogurt commercial featuring two women discussing the deliciousness of their yogurt. One opines that it is "Zen wrapped in Karma dipped In chocolate good."

== Reception ==
Zen Wrapped in Karma Dipped in Chocolate received mostly positive reviews. Publishers Weekly said of the book, " As ever, Warner is unafraid to smash idols, including his own celebrity status as a Zen master." and "Those familiar with his previous work will find this book exceptionally plainspoken and pungent".

Elephant Journal claimed that Zen Wrapped in Karma Dipped in Chocolate was " destined to be on my "best of '09″ list." A review for Razorcake stated "he's written a book on a subject that I have absolutely zero interest in, and he's done it well enough that I plowed right through the thing in record time."
