= Klover =

American punk rock band

- Klover, 1995. L-R: Darren Hill, Mike Stone, Chris Doherty, and Brian Betzger.

Background information
- Origin: Boston, Massachusetts, U.S.
- Genres: Punk rock
- Years active: 1995
- Label: Mercury Records
- Past members: Brian Betzger; Chris Doherty; Darren Hill; Mike Stone

Klover was an American punk band from Boston, Massachusetts. The short-lived band consisted of Mike Stone (later a Queensrÿche guitarist) on vocals and guitar, Chris Doherty (ex-Gang Green) on lead guitar, Darren Hill (ex-Red Rockers, Paul Westerberg) on bass and Brian Betzger (ex-Jerry's Kids, Gang Green) on drums.

They released only one album, Feel Lucky Punk?, and an EP, Beginning to End, on Mercury Records in 1995 and disbanded after the subsequent tour. "Beginning to End" was used in the soundtrack for the 1995 Sylvester Stallone film Assassins.

== Discography ==
- Feel Lucky Punk? (Mercury, 1995)
1. "Our Way"
2. "Beginning to End"
3. "Here I Go Again"
4. "All Kindsa Girls"
5. "What a Waste"
6. "I Wanna Be"
7. "Memory"
8. "Brain"
9. "Illusions (Make It Go Away)"
10. "Sandbag"
11. "Building a Wall"
12. "Y.R.U. (Still Here)"
- Beginning to End (EP) (Mercury, 1995)
1. "Beginning to End"
2. "Common Factor" (non-lp)
3. "Nothing" (non-lp)
4. "Building a Wall"
