= Gang Green =

American hardcore band

- Origin: Boston, Massachusetts, U.S.
- Genres: Hardcore punk; crossover thrash; skate punk; speed metal
- Works: Discography
- Years active: 1980–1983; 1984–1992; 1996–1998; 2005–present
- Labels: Taang!; Roadrunner
- Members: Chris Doherty; Chris Donnelly; Sean Boyle; Matt Hemingway
- Past members: Daren Hiller; Brian Betzger; Kevin Brooks; Mike Dean; Fritz Erickson; Joe Gittleman; Mike Lucantonio; Bill Manley; Tony Nichols; Josh Pappe; Chuck Stilphen; Glen Stilphen; Bob Cenci

Gang Green is an American hardcore punk/crossover thrash band originally from Braintree, Massachusetts. Chris Doherty (guitar), Bill Manley (bass) and Mike Dean (drums) started the band in 1980 and broke up in 1983. Doherty reformed Gang Green the following year, and the band experienced numerous lineup changes until its dissolution for the second time in 1992. Doherty has been the band's only constant member and has kept Gang Green active from 2005 onwards. The band was influential in the formation of the East Coast hardcore scene, and went on to become one of the forerunners of crossover thrash and speed metal in the late 1980s. With AllMusic dubbing them "Far and away the biggest name to emerge from the Boston hardcore scene."

== History ==
=== Formation and first hiatus (1980–1984) ===
The first incarnation of the band in 1980 consisted of then-15-year-old Chris Doherty, Mike Dean, and Bill Manley, who contributed seven tracks to the This Is Boston, Not L.A. compilation in 1982, and one track to the follow-up Unsafe at Any Speed EP, also in 1982. Throughout that year the band played man shows in Massachusetts along with Washington, D.C., New York and New Jersey. Opening for bands such as S.S. Decontrol, Bad Brains and The Misfits.

In mid-1983, the group disbanded, as lead singer Chris Doherty had already joined the band Jerry's Kids, for their album Is This My World?. In 1985, Gang Green released the 7" "Sold Out" on Taang! Records, the influential Boston label's first release. All of the tracks recorded by the original line up of Gang Green were later released on the Preschool CD, released by Taang! Records.

=== First reunion and Another Wasted Night (1984–1986) ===
In late 1984, Chris Doherty reemerged with an all new Gang Green lineup consisting of former members of D.A.M.M. (Drunks Against Mad Mothers), The Freeze and Smegma And The Nunz. Chuck Stilphen (lead guitar), Glen Stilphen (bass, vocals) and Walter Gustafson (drums). This second lineup is the most famous nationally as it was both the first to tour and the one that recorded the songs "Alcohol" and "Skate to Hell". This edition of Gang Green released the debut album Another Wasted Night on Taang! Records in 1986. This record is considered to be the band's best recording and is regarded as one of the definitive hardcore punk records of its time. This line-up of Doherty, Stilphen, Stilphen and Gustafson only existed for one year from November 1984 until November 1985 before Gustafson quit to pursue The Outlets. The sound of the band changed again after this point. The brothers went on to form Mallet Head and Scratch. Glen was in The Northern Skulls from 2018–2021 with Jonah Jenkins (Only Living Witness, Milligram), Johnny Mullin and Michael Lefebvre. Glen is currently in Spiller with Jack Clark long-time drummer of Jerry's Kids, Greg Fiore and Chris Pearson from Green Magnet School.

During the summer of 1985, the band embarked on a US tour and continued touring the US regularly till May 1986. In June of that year the band embarked on their "Wasted Nights" North American Summer tour. With Another Wasted Night being released near the end of the tour. Following the album's release the band continued touring regularly tour the US for the rest of the year including opening for Ozzy Osbourne during Summer Jam 1986 at the Kingston Fair Grounds in Kingston, New Hampshire. Film director Paul Rachman (American Hardcore) directed the music video for "Alcohol" as well music videos for "Have Fun" and "Another Wasted Night" which all aired on 120 Minutes on MTV.

The song "Alcohol" (C. Stilphen/C. Doherty) from Another Wasted Night has been covered by a number of bands. Tankard, a German thrash metal band, featured the song on their album Chemical Invasion. It was also covered by Impaled Nazarene, a black metal band from Finland. It appeared on their EP entitled Motörpenis which was released in 1996. Boston punk rock band Dropkick Murphys covered the song on their "Back to the Hub" 7 inch. It also appeared on their live compilation, Live on St. Patrick's Day from Boston, MA. Before The Meatmen covered "Alcohol", Tesco Vee's Hate Police featuring Keith Campbell and Tommy "Dog" Cohen, released it on a 7" on Sympathy For The Record Industry. Then it was also covered by The Meatmen on their album Pope on a Rope, and also by No Fun at All on their releases No Straight Angles (US edition), EP's Going Steady, and Master Celebrations, and by Australian band, Where's The Pope? who released it on their PSI album released on Resist Records. Metallica also played the song live. The song was originally an instrumental entitled "The Drinking Song" before Doherty attached his lyrics. "Alcohol" also appears on the soundtrack to the 2010 film Jackass 3D.

=== Roadrunner years (1987–1989) ===
By 1987, when Gang Green were signed by Roadrunner Records the band's musical style had come to lean more toward heavy metal and the personnel of the band had changed completely after the Stilphen brothers departed at the end of 1986. This incarnation of Gang Green consisted of Doherty, Fritz Erickson (guitar), Joe Gittleman (bass) and former Jerry's Kids drummer Brian Betzger. The groups Roadrunner debut You Got It was released in 1987, the group then toured Europe to end the year.

In 1988, the five song EP I81B4U was released via Roadrunner, During the Spring of that year Gang Green toured alongside The Goo Goo Dolls and toured Europe during the end of the year opening up for D.R.I..

To begin 1989, Gang Green toured the US during the Spring. Gittleman was fired by Doherty and was replaced by Josh Pappe, formerly of Dirty Rotten Imbeciles. Gittleman returned to The Mighty Mighty Bosstones. The band's Older... Budweiser album was named so the band could attract sponsorship from the brewery of the same name.

=== Second hiatus (1990–1995) ===
From January 25 to February 25, 1990, Gang Green took part in the "Party Machine" European tour alongside Meliah Rage. This was then followed by the "Can't Live Without You" US tour with Social Distortion during the Spring. Following this tour Gang Green experienced a few more lineup shuffles with former D.R.I. bassist Josh Pappe joining the band to record the live album Can't Live Without It. Soon after the band were dropped by Roadrunner and played their final show on December 16, 1991, at The Dome, London, England went on a second hiatus for several years in which Doherty founding other projects such as Klover (Mercury Records) and Hamerd.

=== Second reunion (1996–2004) ===
In 1996, Chris Doherty, Chuck Stilphen, Glen Stilphen and Walter Gustafson re-formed to play five East Coast dates including shows at The Rat and CBGB's. Later in 1996, Gang Green surfaced yet again with Walter Gustafson returning on drums, along with newcomers Mike Earls (guitar, vocals) and Matt Sandonato (bass, vocals). They re-signed with Taang! Records and in 1997 released Back & Gacked (EP) and Another Case of Brewtality. These records saw the band returning to their punk roots and even moving in a pop direction. Gang Green toured Europe and the U.S. extensively in 1997 and 1998. Doherty moved from Boston to Cincinnati shortly afterwards and, in the early 2000s, Gang Green played only once or twice a year in Boston and New York.

=== Third reunion and Doherty's stroke (2005–2021) ===
In 2005, Doherty and a new Gang Green lineup supported the Dropkick Murphys' West Coast leg of their US tour.

In early 2007, the band toured through Florida and up the east coast of the US with bands such as Lucky Scars before heading out for a European tour scheduled for spring 2007 that included UK and Irish dates. The Irish dates were filmed for a live DVD by punk filmmaker, Lewis Smithingham.

In 2013, Doherty teamed up with local Cincinnati music veterans Chris Donelly, Dale Kishbaugh and Sean Boyle. This lineup toured the US and Europe throughout the 2010s.

On October 31, 2018, Doherty suffered a stroke which left him paralyzed on his left side. 10 weeks after suffering the stroke the bands former manager Alec Peters scheduled a benefit show titled "Not a Wasted Night Out" which included performances by Slapshot, Tree, F.U.s, Evan Dando of The Lemonheads, The Outlets, and Springa of SSD.

=== Return of Doherty and recent activity (2022–present) ===
After several years of physical rehabilitation Doherty returned to the stage with Gang Green for the first time in nearly four years on October 1, 2022 at the Midway Cafe in Boston. In January 2023, Cherry Red Records released a 56 song box set titled Well Give It to You. They spent the summer of that year touring the East Coast and making European festival appearances.

During the summer of 2026, Gang Green toured the East Coast in celebration of Another Wasted Night 40th anniversary.

== Musical style ==
During the beginning of their career Gang Green played a more traditional hardcore sound, however with later releases the band began to incorporate a more hard rock and metal sound. Decibel also described them as "one of the first skate punk acts." Adding "even though they were more punk than metal you can pretty much draw a straight line from this to Municipal Waste or SSS."

Unlike many bands of the time Gang Green were opposed to the straight edge lifestyle, with their lyrics touching upon drinking, partying, skateboarding and sex life. AllMusic described the band as an "unabashed party band specializing in beer-soaked, warp-speed three-chord thrash." In a 2019, interview The Proletariat vocalist Richard Brown stated that despite not being a straight edge band Gang Green never faced any trouble from straight edge bands due to them playing "lightning-fast."

== Band members ==
=== Current ===
- Chris Doherty – vocals, guitar (1980–present)
- Mikke Brennan – rhythm guitar
- Nick Hebditch – bass
- Johnnie Luevano – lead guitar
- Josh Goodreau – drums

=== Former and touring ===
- Ray Jeffrey – guitar
- Chuck Stilphen – guitar (1984–1986, 1996)
- Tony Nichols – guitar (1986–1987)
- Fritz Erickson – guitar (1987–1990)
- Mike Lucantonio – guitar (1990–1992)
- Molly Flanagan – guitar and vocals (1991, 1992)
- Mike Earls – guitar (1996–1998, 2007–2011)
- Bryan Hinkley – guitar (1999)
- Bob Cenci – guitar (2005–2007)
- Bill Manley – bass (1980–1983)
- Glen Stilphen – bass (1984–1986, 1996)
- Joe Gittleman – bass (1986–1989)
- Josh Pappe – bass (1989–1991; died 2020)
- Kevin Brooks – bass (1991–1992)
- Matt Sandonato – bass (1996–1998, 2005–2011)
- Dusty Bryant – bass (2009)
- Mike Dean – drums (1980–1983)
- Brian Betzger – drums (1986–1991, 1991–1992)
- Nate Rubright – drums and vocals (1991, 1992)
- Walter Gustafson – drums (1984–1985, 1991, 1996–1998, 2005–2011)
- Troy Bryant- drums (2009)
- Davis Gunter – keyboards (2001)
- Chris Donnelly – vocals, guitar (2013–2019)
- Sean Boyle – vocals, bass (2013–2017)
- Dale Kishbaugh - drums (2013-2014)
- Matt Hemingway – drums (2014–2019)

== Discography ==
- Another Wasted Night (1986)
- You Got It (1987)
- I81B4U (EP) (1988)
- Can't Live Without It (1988)
- Older... Budweiser (1989)
- Another Case of Brewtality (1997)

== Awards ==
Boston Music Awards

Year	Nominee / work	Award	Result
1987	Gang Green	Best Heavy Metal/Hardcore Act	Won
2006	Gang Green	Hall of Fame	Inducted
