= Preschool (disambiguation) =

Preschool education is the provision of structured learning to children before the commencement of formal education.

Preschool may also refer to:

- Preschool (South Park), an episode of the animated television series South Park
- Preschool (album), a 1997 compilation album by Gang Green
- Preschool (film), a 2026 American comedy film
