= The Proletariat =

Punk rock band from Massachusetts

- The Proletariat's original lineup, left to right: Tom McKnight, Frank Michaels, Peter Bevilacqua, and Richard Brown.

Background information
- Origin: Southeastern Massachusetts, United States
- Genres: Hardcore punk; post-punk; noise rock; art punk
- Years active: 1980–1985, 2016–Present
- Labels: Modern Method; Non-U; Radiobeat; Homestead; Taang!; Bridge Nine; Boss Tuneage
- Spinoffs: Churn
- Members: Richard Brown; Peter Bevilacqua; Tom McKnight; Don Sanders
- Past members: Frank Michaels; Laurel Ann Bowman †; Steve Welch
- Website: proletariatband.com

The Proletariat are a punk rock band from Southeastern Massachusetts, whose heyday was during the 1980s, when they were active in the early Boston hardcore scene, sharing the bill with many of the best punk and hardcore punk acts of the time, despite their recorded output having a decidedly non-hardcore aesthetic. The Proletariat show more strongly the musical influences of early British post-punk bands such as Wire and the Gang of Four in their fractured guitar sound and Marxist-themed lyrics.

== History ==
=== Early years (1980-mid-1982) ===
Formed in early 1980, the Proletariat started as a cover band playing at hardcore punk shows in the Boston area, just as the local scene was breaking. Belligerent British-sounding American singer Richard Brown fronted the group with two friends, both former classmates of his at Apponequet Regional High School: guitarist Frank Michaels and bassist Peter Bevilacqua. The three had enrolled at Southeastern Massachusetts University together, where they studied history, finance, and industrial relations, respectively, but, after exposure to left-wing politics, and despite having no previous musical experience, all dropped out of college during their senior year to form a punk band, which Brown would name the Proletariat. In wanting to align themselves with the working class, Brown took work as a delivery truck driver, and Bevilacqua as a supermarket clerk; Michaels, for his part, devoted himself to managing the band.

Brown initially played snare drum standing up while he sang, until the slightly younger high-schooler Tom McKnight, who worked as a gas station attendant, completed the band as their drummer in September 1980, occasionally accompanied by Brown on cowbell. After a few months of practicing at Brown's parental home in Assonet, the group played their first gig on February 14, 1981 at the Lafayette Club in Taunton. By mid-1981, after playing a few shows in Southeastern Massachusetts, doing mostly Sex Pistols covers, the Proletariat evolved a new sound that melded the straight-ahead sound of early records by the Clash with more angular rhythms, and agitprop political rhetoric under the influence of the Gang of Four. They grew into a sound unlike other Boston punk or hardcore bands, characterized by drums holding an almost militaristic steadiness while guitars alternated between jarring upstrokes and overdriven chords. People drew comparisons of the band's music to that of the anarchist group Crass and post-punk group the Fall, bands that the Proletariat's members only listened to after fans tipped them off to it.

Between November 1981 and March 1982, they recorded material at Boston's Radiobeat Studios with producers Jimmy Dufour and Lou Giordano, and brought a couple of songs as reels for airplay on local radio, making some stations' top-ten lists. In July 1982, after the group gained national exposure via the hardcore punk audience on This is Boston, Not L.A., a compilation of bands from the local scene just released in May of that year by Newbury Comics' Modern Method Records label, they self-released a limited edition seven-song cassette EP called Distortion, which received positive response from local critics and DJs. In the late summer of 1982, the band would appear on Unsafe at Any Speed, the six-song follow-up compilation EP to This is Boston, Not L.A.

"The Proletariat were a Hardcore band that had a backbeat you could dance to, the most slam-danceable — they had that serious marching beat down. They were given the Hardcore tag because they wrote short songs and kinda fit in."

— Edward "Shred" Jacobs, former DJ at Boston's WERS and WBCN radio stations

=== Repute and Soma Holiday (late 1982–1983) ===
The Proletariat "Bread and Circus" (1983)
"Bread and Circus" excerpt, from Soma Holiday.

As a live band the Proletariat were making a name for themselves after becoming finalists in the 1982 Rock 'n' Roll Rumble competition hosted by Boston commercial radio station WBCN, and haranguing the oppressive management of Boston's Paradise Rock Club. Because of their proximity to Rhode Island, they gigged more frequently in Providence and Pawtucket, where they had a devoted following. The group also received monetary contributions from benefactors who wanted to support the Proletariat's music and politics.

Four songs from the Proletariat's earlier demo tape surfaced on vinyl along with 14 more songs to comprise the band's first LP, Soma Holiday, hailed by rock critic Robert Christgau as "the hardcore debut of 1983", even as Christgau noted their sound was not hardcore per se. Named for the drug in Aldous Huxley's Brave New World, the album demonstrates the band's art punk roots, with lyrics examining social issues from Brown's distant Marxist perspective, critiquing capitalism without embracing determinist revolutionary dogma. The band's members were themselves members of the working class, most of whom had dropped out of college to drive trucks and labor elsewhere.

In the 1983 Boston Rock magazine's year-end poll, the Proletariat placed first as best local band, second for best record, and fourth as best national band.

"The Proletariat played offbeat post-Punk with Hardcore intensity and a radical twist. Frontman Richard Brown wrote oblique lyrics, part Ginsberg, part Mao ... 1983's Soma Holiday LP ... came off light years ahead of its time..." (Note: As originally worded, in the first edition of American Hardcore: A Tribal History, this same paragraph reads: "The Proletariat played vicious [hardcore] fused with a jagged Gang Of Four/Killing Joke edge. Frontman Richard Brown wrote poetically oblique lyrics with a distinct Marxist bent – part Burroughs, part Mao. Soma Holiday, their '83 LP, was way ahead of its time...")

— Steven Blush, author of American Hardcore: A Tribal History

=== Breakup and Indifference (1984-85) ===
In 1984, the Proletariat returned to Radiobeat Studios to record another album with Dufour and Giordano, assisted by Josiah McElheny. An early version of "An Uneasy Peace", a song composed for the upcoming album, brought the band international attention via its inclusion on the P.E.A.C.E. compilation, a hardcore punk collection released on Dave Dictor's R Radical Records label that included more well known bands like the Dead Kennedys, Crass, and MDC. On June 30, 1984, the Proletariat performed what would be their final show with their original lineup at Chet's Last Call in Boston, sharing the bill with the Volcano Suns and fellow Radiobeat labelmates Sorry. Later that year, before their second album was completed, Brown quit the band, as did McKnight who was studying engineering at Bristol Community College. The two would be replaced by female singer Laurel Ann Bowman and drummer Steve Welch; both of whom performed on recordings of two songs for the new album. This lineup was short-lived, and the Proletariat disbanded shortly after performing a pair of shows on July 1, 1985 with Italian band Raw Power and the local act Rash of Stabbings, at the Living Room rock club in Providence, Rhode Island.

The Proletariat "An Uneasy Peace" (1985)
"An Uneasy Peace" excerpt, with Roger Miller on keyboards, from Indifference.

The band's new recordings were released as the album Indifference and its lead single titled "Marketplace" on Homestead Records in 1985. Both the album and single showed another side of the band, including layered melodies and featuring a guest appearance by Roger Miller of Mission of Burma playing piano on an updated version of "An Uneasy Peace", as well as Laurel Bowman's soft-toned voice in sharp contrast with Brown's staccato pronouncements.

=== Churn and reissued discography (1995-1998) ===
In early 1995, after ten years of not playing together, Brown, Bevilacqua, and Michaels, with new drummer Jack Prascovics, formed a new band called Churn. By mid-1996, McKnight joined them to replace a previous drummer, with the result that all the original members of the Proletariat got reunited in Churn, albeit for a short time. In 1997, after continued lineup problems, the group broke up, having only released a five-song CD titled Heated Couplings in the Sun in 1995.

In 1998, all of the Proletariat's recorded material, including four previously unreleased tracks, was compiled on Voodoo Economics and Other American Tragedies, a double CD collection released on Taang! Records.

=== Reformation (2016–present) ===
After a three-decade hiatus, the Proletariat reformed for a series of shows in the fall of 2016. Original members Richard Brown, Peter Bevilacqua and Tom McKnight were joined by guitarist Don Sanders, former member of the Providence early hardcore punk band Idle Rich. The band's return was accompanied by the vinyl reissue, on Sacramento-based label Ss Records, of their 1983 debut album, Soma Holiday.

In the spring of 2017, the Proletariat performed a handful of shows in the United States and Canada, including an appearance on March 25 at the fifth edition of Bleak Outlook, the annual citywide weekend music festival of Tacoma, Washington.

Recently, the band have confirmed tour dates, including a festival appearance in Pittsburgh, Pennsylvania, for the second half of 2017. Also, they have announced the recording of a new EP in August, and a new studio album in the works for early 2018.

== Discography ==
Besides the Proletariat's official output, there are recordings of three live performances they did on Metrowave, a show that ran on Sunday nights from 9pm to midnight on Emerson College's FM radio station, WERS. At least two of those radio sessions, broadcast on December 6, 1981 and 29 May 1983, respectively, have made the rounds in tape trading circles and on the Internet. "It's More Than Soil", one of the four previously unreleased songs featured on the Voodoo Economics and Other American Tragedies anthology, was taken from one of the WERS sessions.

Studio albums

- Soma Holiday (1983, Non-U/Radiobeat).
- Indifference (1985, Homestead).
- Move (2019, Boss Tuneage).

EPs

- Distortion (1982, Non-U).
- The Murder of Alton Sterling (2018, Bridge Nine).

Singles

- "Marketplace"/"Death of a Hedon" (1985, Homestead).

Compilations The 2CD compilation Voodoo Economics and Other American Tragedies (1998, Taang!) contains all their recorded work, including the previously unreleased tracks "Ten Years", "Abstain", "Choice", and "It's More Than Soil" (live in studio).

Compilation appearances

- "Options", "Religion Is the Opium of the Masses", and "Allegiance", on This Is Boston, Not L.A. (1982, Modern Method).
- "Voodoo Economics", on Unsafe at Any Speed (EP 1982, Modern Method).
- "An Uneasy Peace" (early version), on the International P.E.A.C.E. Benefit Compilation (1984, R Radical).
- "No Lesser of Evils", on All for One... One for All: A Benefit for Roger Miret (1995, Grand Theft Audio).
- "Abstain", on Suburban Voice: 15th Anniversary Compilation (1998, Suburban Voice).

== Works cited ==
- Blush, Steven (2001). American Hardcore: A Tribal History. Port Townsend, Washington: Feral House. ISBN 9780922915712.
- Blush, Steven (2010). American Hardcore: A Tribal History (2nd ed.). Port Townsend, Washington: Feral House. ISBN 9781932595895.
- Hurchalla, George (2016). Going Underground: American Punk 1979–1989 (2nd ed.). Oakland, California: PM Press. ISBN 9781629631134.
