= Break It Up =

Break It Up may refer to:

- "Break It Up", a song from the 1975 album Horses by Patti Smith
- "Break It Up" (Foreigner song), 1982
- "Break It Up" (Rocket from the Crypt song), 1998
- "Break It Up" (Scooter song), 1996
- Break It Up (SSD album), 1985
- Break It Up (Jemina Pearl album), 2009
- "Break It Up", a 1991 song by Cypress Hill from the album Cypress Hill

== See also ==
- "Break It up, Break It Up", the third episode of The Drew Carey Show's second season
