= Sit Down, Shut Up =

Sit Down, Shut Up may refer to:

- Sit Down, Shut Up (2001 TV series), an Australian live-action sitcom
- Sit Down, Shut Up (2009 TV series), an American animated series
- Sit Down and Shut Up: Punk Rock Commentaries on Buddha, God, Truth, Sex, Death, & Dogen's Treasury of the Right Dharma Eye, a 2007 book by Brad Warner
