= Brad Warner =

American musician and Buddhist priest

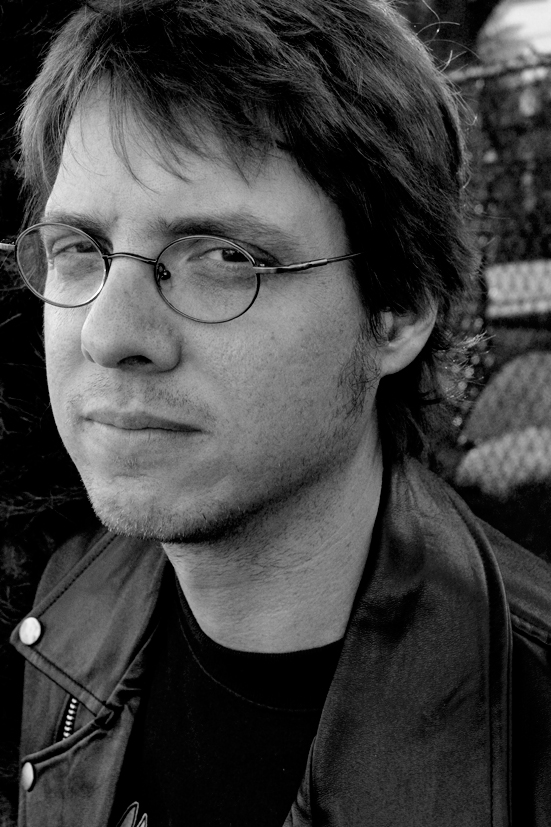
- Warner in 2008
- Title: Priest

Personal life
- Born: March 5, 1964 (age 62) Hamilton, Ohio, U.S.
- Education: Kent State University
- Occupation: Author, blogger, documentarian, musician, Zen teacher

Religious life
- Religion: Buddhism
- School: Soto Zen
- Dharma name: Ōdō

Senior posting
- Teacher: Gudō Wafu Nishijima

Military service
- Website: hardcorezen.info

Brad Warner (born March 5, 1964) is an American Sōtō Zen teacher, author, blogger, documentarian, and punk rock bass guitarist.

== Biography ==
Brad Warner was born in Hamilton, Ohio, in 1964. His family traveled for his father's job and Warner spent some time in Nairobi, Kenya, but grew up mainly near Akron, Ohio, and attended Kent State University. As a teenager, Warner got into the music of the 1980s and hardcore punk, and a friend of his took him to a show by Zero Defex. He auditioned for and joined the band after finding out they needed a bass guitarist. He agreed to write articles for SuicideGirls, an online soft porn site, but stopped after a few years.

Warner has played with Dimentia 13. After the financial failure of his Dimentia 13 albums, Warner got a job in Japan with the JET Programme, and then later in 1994 with Tsuburaya Productions, the company behind Ultraman. Warner played the roles of various foreigners in their programs.

In 2007 he directed the documentary film Cleveland’s Screaming, which depicts the punk rock scene in Akron and Cleveland in the 1980s.

== Zen Buddhism ==
Warner began practicing Zen Buddhism under his first teacher, Tim McCarthy. Warner later studied with Gyomay Kubose. While in Japan, he met and trained with Gudō Wafu Nishijima, a student of Rempo Niwa Zenji, who ordained him as a priest and named him as his dharma heir in 2000.

In 2007, Gudo Wafu Nishijima named Warner the leader of Dogen Sangha International which Nishijima had founded. Warner dissolved the organization in April 2012.

In 2012, Warner moved to California and started Dogen Sangha Los Angeles.

In 2013, Pirooz Kalayeh directed a film about Warner entitled Brad Warner's Hardcore Zen The film premiered on October 5, 2013 in Amsterdam at the Buddhist Film Festival of Europe.

== Bibliography ==
=== Fiction ===
- Warner, Brad (2011). Death To All Monsters!. Hardcore Zen Books. ISBN 9781257647248.

=== Non-fiction ===
- Warner, Brad (2003). Hardcore Zen: Punk Rock, Monster Movies & the Truth About Reality. Wisdom Publications. ISBN 0-86171-380-X.
- Warner, Brad (2007). Sit Down and Shut Up: Punk Rock Commentaries on Buddha, God, Truth, Sex, Death, and Dogen's Treasury of the Right Dharma Eye. New World Library. ISBN 978-1-57731-559-9.
- Warner, Brad (2009). Zen Wrapped in Karma Dipped in Chocolate: A Trip Through Death, Sex, Divorce, and Spiritual Celebrity in Search of the True Dharma. New World Library. ISBN 978-1-57731-654-1.
- Warner, Brad (2010). Sex, Sin, and Zen: A Buddhist Exploration of Sex from Celibacy to Polyamory and Everything in Between. New World Library. ISBN 978-1-57731-910-8.
- Nishijima, Gudo Wafu; Brad Warner (2011). Fundamental Wisdom of the Middle Way: Nagarjuna's Mulamadhyamakakarika. Monkfish Book Publishing. ISBN 978-0-9833589-0-9.
- Warner, Brad (2012). Hardcore Zen Strikes Again!. Cooperative Press. ISBN 9781937513078.
- Warner, Brad (2013). There Is No God and He Is Always With You: A Search for God in Odd Places. New World Library. ISBN 9781608681839.
- Warner, Brad (2016). Don't Be a Jerk: And Other Practical Advice from Dogen, Japan's Greatest Zen Master. New World Library. ISBN 9781608683888.
- Warner, Brad (2017). It Came from Beyond Zen!: More Practical Advice from Dogen, Japan's Greatest Zen Master: 2. New World Library. ISBN 9781608685110.
- Warner, Brad (2019). Letters to a Dead Friend about Zen. New World Library. ISBN 9781608686018.
- Warner, Brad (2022). The Other Side of Nothing: The Zen Ethics of Time, Space, and Being. New World Library. ISBN 9781608688043.

== Discography ==
Compilations

- The New Hope. New Hope Records. 1983.
- International P.E.A.C.E. Benefit Compilation (double LP). R Radical Records. 1984.
- Midnight X-Mess #2 LP. Midnight Records. 1986.
- Midnight X-Mess #3 LP. Midnight Records. 1987.

Dimentia 13

- Dimentia 13. Midnight Records. 1985.
- Mirror Mind. Midnight Records. 1987.
- Disturb the Air. Midnight Records. 1989.
- T.V. Screen Head. Midnight Records. 1990.
- Flat Earth Society. Midnight Records. 1991.

Guest appearances

- Twink and Plasticland (1989). You Need a Fairy Godmother. Midnight Records.

0DFx

- drop the A-bomb. Get Revenge Records. 2007. (1982 demo reissue)
- Discography. Get Revenge Records. 2007. (1982 demo and 1983 debut, 2 CD)
- War Hero. Get Revenge Records. 2007. (1983 debut reissue)
- Zero Defex. 0DFx Records. 2008. (New recordings 2007/2008)

== See also ==
- Timeline of Zen Buddhism in the United States
