= Indifference =

Indifference may refer to:

- Apathy, a psychological attitude
- A concept of beneficial detachment in Ignatian spirituality
- Indifference (album), 1985 album by the Proletariat, or the title song
- "Indifference" (Law & Order), 1990 episode of the television series Law & Order
- "Indifference" (The Walking Dead), 2013 episode of the television series The Walking Dead
- Indifference curve, in microeconomic theory, a graph describing consumer preferences
- Principle of indifference, in probability theory, a rule for assigning epistemic probabilities
- A song on the band Pearl Jam's second album Vs.
- In Catholicism, indifferentism, the belief which holds that no religion is superior to another
- Indifferent, a promotional single from Megan Moroney's album Am I Okay?

== See also ==
- Difference (disambiguation)
