= Soma Holiday =

A soma holiday is a catatonic, drug-induced state of mind in Aldous Huxley's Brave New World, but may also refer to:

- Soma Holiday (the Proletariat album), 1983 album by the Proletariat
- Soma Holiday (Greenwheel album), 2002 album by Greenwheel
- Soma Holiday (Soma Holiday album), 1990 album by Soma Holiday-SF
