= How We Rock =

Studio album by SSD
- Released: September 1984
- Recorded: 1984
- Studio: Downtown Recorders
- Genre: Hardcore punk; heavy metal
- Label: Modern Method
- Producer: Mike Bastarache, Lou Giordano

SSD chronology
| Get It Away (1983) | How We Rock (1984) | Break It Up (1985) |

How We Rock was the third release from the Boston hardcore punk band SSD. It was rooted in the hardcore sound but exhibited overt heavy metal characteristics, such as a relatively high number of lengthy guitar solos.

== Track listing ==
All songs written and arranged by SS Decontrol.

=== Side A ===
1. "Intro" 3:13
2. "How We Rock" 2:20
3. "Words That Kill" 3:19
4. "The Choice" 2:53

=== Side B ===
1. "On the Road" 3:42
2. "What It Takes" 3:44
3. "What If I" 3:10

== Personnel ==
- Springa – vocals
- Al Barile – rhythm guitar
- Francois Levesque – lead guitar
- Jaime Sciarappa – bass
- Chris Foley – drums
