= Indifference (album) =

Studio album by the Proletariat
- Released: 1985
- Studio: Radiobeat
- Genre: Post-punk; hardcore punk; noise rock; art punk
- Length: 43:27
- Language: English
- Label: Homestead
- Producer: Lou Giordano; Frank Michaels

The Proletariat chronology
Marketplace (1985)	Indifference (1985)	Voodoo Economics and Other American Tragedies (1998)

Singles from Indifference
- 1. "Marketplace" Released: 1985

Indifference is the second studio album by American punk rock band the Proletariat.

The record was named after its opening song, which was inspired by the photography of David Henry of the homeless in Boston, Massachusetts. One of Henry's photos serves as the album's front cover.

In late 1984, before Indifference was completed, lead vocalist Richard Brown and drummer Tom McKnight left the band. They were replaced by Laurel Ann Bowman, and Steve Welch, both of whom performed on the new album's songs "Homeland" and "The Guns Are Winning".

Roger Miller of Mission of Burma makes a guest appearance playing the piano in the track "An Uneasy Peace", which is an updated version from that contributed to the hardcore punk compilation P.E.A.C.E., (Note: R Radical #R.R.R. 1984) released a year earlier on R Radical Records.

Indifference was preceded by its lead single "Marketplace". (Note: Homestead #HMS 037)

== Production and release ==
Produced by Lou Giordano and Frank Michaels, Indifference was recorded in different sessions at Radiobeat Studios in Boston, mixed at White Dog Studio in Newton, Massachusetts, and mastered by George "Porky" Peckham at Porky's Mastering in London, England. (Note: The mastering engineer, uncredited on the cover art, can be identified via the run-out groove etchings onto the original vinyl pressings, which reads as follows: "HMS-52-A2 A PORKY PRIME CUT MT.1" (side A), and "HMS-52-B2 PRM. MT.1" (side B).) It was released in 1985 on Homestead Records, on LP (Note: Homestead #HMS 052) and Compact Cassette. (Note: Homestead #HMS 052-C) Etched onto its run-out grooves, the vinyl release features, in a mocking way, a paraphrase of the main conclusion of the 1984 Ronald Reagan's Task Force on Food Assistance report, which reads as follows: "There is no evidence of wide spread hunger in America.." (side A), "....Government report on federal assistance." (side B). (Note: "... with this possible exception [the homeless], there is no evidence that widespread undernutrition is a major health problem in the United States." – U.S. President, Task Force on Food Assistance, 1984)

== Critical reception ==
Oliver Sheppard, contributor at the online magazine Souciant, was of the view that Indifference:

"... is every bit as good as Soma Holiday, yet still sorely overlooked. A mature mix of smart songwriting and deft, accomplished instrumentation, the album hints at the early "positive punk" of UK bands like Sex Gang Children or Furyo. The influence of bands like The Dils, the Mekons, and fellow Bostonite postpunkers Mission of Burma also courses strongly through the LP’s veins ... Like Middle Class’ Homeland LP, it seems an accident of geography (i.e. the band is from Boston, not London) that has resulted in the record languishing in obscurity."

For his part, Ryan Foley, from The Music Museum of New England, commented:

"[In the Proletariat's second album] The sense of urgency was heightened, the threat of violence more pointed. On songs like "The Guns Are Winning" and "Homeland" the band tackled sociopolitical issues that are still relevant today..."

The punk zine Suburban Voice wrote:

"... Texture and melody became an increasing part of the picture by the time [the Proletariat] had reached their second album, "Indifference", but it was without sacrificing the purity of rage."

== "Marketplace" 7" ==
"Marketplace"

Single by the Proletariat

from the album Indifference
- B-side: "Death of a Hedon" (3:29)
- Released: 1985
- Studio: Radiobeat
- Genre: Post-punk; hardcore punk; noise rock
- Length: 2:38
- Label: Homestead
- Songwriter(s): Richard Brown; Peter Bevilacqua; Frank Michaels
- Producer(s): Lou Giordano; Frank Michaels

The Proletariat singles chronology
"Soma Holiday" (1983)	"Marketplace" (1985)	"Indifference" (1985)

"Marketplace" is a song by the Proletariat, originally released in 1985 on Homestead Records as the lead single for the band's second studio album, Indifference, on which it is featured as the closing track. The B-side to the single, "Death of a Hedon", was not included on the album. Both songs would be re-released in 1998 as part of the band's anthology Voodoo Economics and Other American Tragedies. (Note: Taang! #TAANG! 127)

The record's front cover features a photograph of a homeless man lying at the top of a stairway while he is avoided and ignored by the people passing by. The image was taken by photographer David Henry at one of the entrances to the Boylston light rail station of the Boston, Massachusetts, rapid transit system.

== Reissues ==
Out of print after its original release, Indifference would later resurface, in its entirety, on the band's 2-CD anthology Voodoo Economics and Other American Tragedies, compiled in 1998 by Taang! Records.

== Track listing ==
Music and arrangements by Peter Bevilacqua and Frank Michaels, lyrics by Richard Brown, except where noted.

Side A
No.	Title	Lyrics	Length
1.	"Indifference"		2:44
2.	"Pride"		2:25
3.	"Better Man"		3:13
4.	"Homeland"	Frank Michaels	3:56
5.	"Columns"		2:37
6.	"Sins"	Peter Bevilacqua	2:25
7.	"An Uneasy Peace" (updated version)		3:25

Side B
No.	Title	Lyrics	Length
1.	"Recollections"	Michaels	2:43
2.	"Instinct"		2:49
3.	"Trail of Tears"		2:43
4.	"The Guns Are Winning"	Michaels	3:40
5.	"No Real Hope/Prelude"		2:38
6.	"No Real Hope"		1:54
7.	"Piecework"		3:34
8.	"Marketplace"		2:41
Total length:			43:27

== Personnel ==
The Proletariat

- Richard Brown – vocals
- Frank Michaels – guitar
- Peter Bevilacqua – bass, backing vocals
- Tom McKnight – drums
- Laurel Bowman - vocals (tracks A4, B4)
- Steve Welch - drums (A4, B4)

Guest performers

- Roger Miller – piano (A7)

Production same credits for the "Marketplace" 7"

- Lou Giordano - co-production, co-engineering
- Frank Michaels - co-production
- Jimmy Dufour – co-engineering
- Josiah McElheny – engineering (assistance)
- George "Porky" Peckham – mastering
- Pickles – graphic design
- David Henry – photography
