= Paul Rachman =

American film director

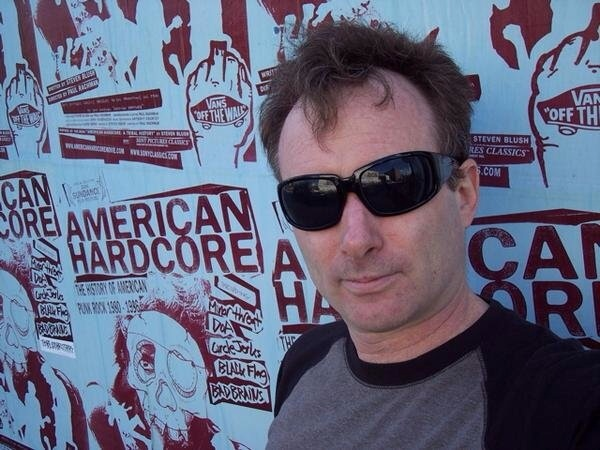
- Rachman in 2006
- Born: September 13, 1962 (age 63); New York City, New York, United States
- Education: Boston University (1982)
- Occupations: Film director, screenwriter, producer, music video director, editor and Slamdance Film Festival co-founder
- Years active: 1980–present
- Known for: American Hardcore; Four Dogs Playing Poker
- Website: paulrachman.com

Paul Rachman (born September 13, 1962) is an American film director who directed the highly praised 2006 documentary on punk music American Hardcore, which premiered at the Sundance Film Festival and was released by Sony Pictures Classics. He is also one of the founders of the Slamdance Film Festival.

Rachman started his career as a music video director with low-budget videos for hardcore punk bands Gang Green and the Bad Brains. He was later signed to Los Angeles–based Propaganda Films, where he directed music videos for bands Sepultura, Alice in Chains, Temple of the Dog, The Replacements, Kiss, Pantera, Joan Jett, and Roger Waters, among many others. He made his feature film debut with the low-budget film noir Four Dogs Playing Poker, starring Forest Whitaker, Tim Curry and Balthazar Getty, released by Warner Home Video. He lives in New York City.
