= Hardcore Zen =

2003 book by Brad Warner

Hardcore Zen: Punk Rock, Monster Movies, & the Truth about Reality
- First edition
- Author: Brad Warner
- Cover artist: Elizabeth Lawrence
- Language: English
- Subject: Sōtō Zen Buddhism
- Publisher: Wisdom Publications
- Publication date: October 3, 2003
- Media type: Print
- Pages: 224
- ISBN: 0-86171-380-X
- OCLC: 52348846
- Dewey Decimal: 294.3/927 21
- LC Class: BQ9288 .W37 2003
- Followed by: Sit Down and Shut Up

Hardcore Zen: Punk Rock, Monster Movies, & the Truth about Reality is a book written by Brad Warner, an author and ordained Zen priest. It was released in October 2003 by Wisdom Publications. The work serves as both an autobiography and an introduction to Sōtō Zen philosophy.

== Reception ==
Hardcore Zen received mostly positive reviews. Publishers Weekly said of the book, "Entertaining, bold and refreshingly direct, this book is likely to change the way one experiences other books about Zen—and maybe even the way one experiences reality." Tricycle: The Buddhist Review said "Hardcore Zen is Be Here Now for now."

== Publication data ==
- Hardcore Zen: Punk Rock, Monster Movies, & the Truth about Reality, Brad Warner, Wisdom Publications (October 2003), 224 pages, ISBN 0-86171-380-X
