= Four Dogs Playing Poker =

- DVD cover
- Directed by: Paul Rachman
- Written by: Shawn David Thompson (as Thomas Durham); William Quist
- Produced by: Steven Hoffman; Matt Salinger
- Starring: Stacy Edwards; Balthazar Getty; Daniel London; Olivia Williams; Tim Curry
- Cinematography: Claudio Rocha
- Edited by: Conrad M. Gonzalez
- Music by: Brian Tyler
- Distributed by: Warner Home Video
- Release date: June 6, 2000
- Running time: 97 minutes
- Country: United States
- Language: English

Four Dogs Playing Poker is a 2000 crime thriller directed by Paul Rachman starring Stacy Edwards, Balthazar Getty, Olivia Williams, Daniel London and Tim Curry. Forest Whitaker makes a cameo appearance in the picture.

== Plot ==
A group of friends steal a valuable statuette for a ruthless art dealer. The amateur thieves botch the delivery of the statuette and the art dealer demands that they pay him $1 million by the end of the week or face the consequences: certain death.

Desperate, the friends decide to take out a $1 million life insurance policy on one of themselves with the idea that if one of them is sacrificed, the others will collect on the policy and be able pay off the art dealer. What follows is a reckoning: The friends enter into a lethal lottery to choose who will be the victim and who will be the killer.

== Cast ==
- Stacy Edwards as Holly
- Balthazar Getty as Julian
- Olivia Williams as Audrey
- Daniel London as Kevin
- Tim Curry as Felix
- Arly Jover as Maria
- George Lazenby as Carlo
- John Taylor as Dick
- Octavia L. Spencer as Waitress
- Inday Ba as Punk Chick
- Forest Whitaker as Mr. Ellington
