= 0DFx =

American hardcore punk band

- Origin: Akron, Ohio, United States
- Genres: Hardcore punk
- Years active: 1981–1983
- Past members: Jimi Imij; Tommy Strange; Mickey X-Nelson; Brad No Sweat

0DFx (also known as Zero Defects or Zero Defex) is an American hardcore punk band.

== History ==
The band was formed in Akron, Ohio, in late 1981 by Tom Seiler of local punk group The Bursting Brains, Mick Hurray of the neo-surf group The Nelsons, and Jim Friend of V-Nervz.

The band went through a few bass players before placing an ad in the Cleveland free paper Scene. Brad Warner, who had been in a new wave group called Mmaxx, answered the ad and after an afternoon audition he was accepted into the band. Warner remained a member of the group until its dissolution.

The band dissolved in the spring of 1983.

In December 2005, Jim Lanza hatched the idea of reviving a handful of old Cleveland-area punk bands for a one time show entitled Cleveland's Screaming. Warner decided to take the opportunity to create a documentary about the punk rock scene in Akron and Cleveland in the 1980s also entitled Cleveland's Screaming. The documentary was released in 2007.

Since they reformed, the band has begun writing and recording new music. In early 2013, the band signed to the record label Revolution Harmony. Zero Defex still plays shows as often as the band members are able.

== Guest appearances ==
0DFx appeared on the Ohio-based punk rock compilation, The New Hope and on the nationally released International P.E.A.C.E. Benefit Compilation, which has remained in print since 1984.

== Members ==
- Jim Friend "Jimi Imij" (vocals)
- Tom Seiler "Tommy Strange" (guitar, 1981–83)
- Jeff Hardy "Jeffro Smull" (guitar, from 2005)
- Mick Hurray "Mickey X-Nelson" (drums)
- Brad Warner "Brad No Sweat" (bass)

=== Short-term members ===
- Alan Litt "Alan Nelson" (bass)
- Franklin Tarver "Frank N. File" (bass)
- John Despins "Johnny Phlegm" (bass)

== Discography ==
=== Studio albums ===
- Zero Defex (0DFx Records 2008)
- Discography (Get Revenge Records, 2008)
- Caught in a Reflection (Revolution Harmony, 2013)

=== EPs ===
- War Hero 7 (Get Revenge Records 016, 2007)
- Drop the A-Bomb 7 (Get Revenge Records 018, 2008)

=== Compilation album appearances ===
- The New Hope (New Hope Records 001, 1983)
  - Songs - Drop the A-Bomb on Me / By the Day / Oppression / No More
- International P.E.A.C.E. Benefit Compilation (R Radical Records, 1984)
  - Song - Drop the A-Bomb on Me

== Related bands ==
- Dimentia 13 (Brad Warner)
