= The Kids Will Have Their Say =

Studio album by SS Decontrol
- Released: 1982
- Recorded: December 1981 – May 1982
- Studio: Active Sound and Radiobeat
- Genre: Hardcore punk; thrashcore
- Length: 21 min
- Label: Dischord/X-Claim
- Producer: Mike Bastarache and Lou Giordano

SS Decontrol chronology
The Kids Will Have Their Say (1982)	Get It Away (1983)

The Kids Will Have Their Say is the debut album by the Boston hardcore punk band SS Decontrol. The album was released in 1982 as a split-release between Dischord and X-Claim records (catalog numbers X-Claim 1/Dischord 7½). Only 1,900 copies were pressed and the album was not repressed or reissued officially until 2023. A bootleg version was made in the late 1980s, but the label names on the back of the sleeves are switched to Discord and Ex-Claim, making it easy to differentiate from the original pressing.

== Reception ==
Writing in The Boston Phoenix, Joyce Millman called the album "a stupefying barrage indistinguishable from dozens of other hardcore LPs. Seventeen tracks tumble into each other, with vocals so rushed and garbled they could be one long harangue; and one number, 'How Much Art Can You Take?' is a parody of highbrow punk and a hymn to inarticulation." Millman felt that "The utility of The Kids Will Have Their Say lies in the lyric sheet, a manifesto by and for Boston's bored, scared, fed-up, and pissed-off teenagers."

== Track listing ==
=== Side A ===
1. "Boiling Point" (0:54)
2. "Fight Them" (1:07)
3. "Do You Even Care" (0:29)
4. "Not Normal" (0:52)
5. "Wasted Youth" (0:33)
6. "Jock Itch" (0:46)
7. "Fun to You" (0:34)
8. "V.A." (0:59)
9. "How Much Art" (3:05)

=== Side B ===
1. "The Kids Will Have Their Say" (1:20)
2. "Headed Straight" (1:29)
3. "War Threat" (1:27)
4. "Teach Me Violence" (0:36)
5. "Screw" (0:21)
6. "Who's to Judge" (1:26)
7. "Police Beat" (1:58)
8. "United" (0:46)
9. "The End" (1:28)

== Personnel ==
- Springa – vocals
- Al Barile – guitar
- Jaime Sciarappa – bass
- Chris Foley – drums
- Larry Lessard – engineer
