= Get It Away =

Studio album by SS Decontrol
- Released: May 1983
- Recorded: Downtown Studios, 1983
- Genre: Hardcore punk
- Length: 11:19
- Label: X-Claim
- Producer: Mike Bastarache and Lou Giordano

SS Decontrol chronology
| The Kids Will Have Their Say (1982) | Get It Away (1983) | How We Rock (1984) |

Get It Away is the second release from the Boston hardcore punk band SS Decontrol. It is the first release to feature Francois Levesque. The cover art, featuring a trash-strewn city street, was done by Pushead, who spelled out his girlfriend's name in part of the trash.

== Track listing ==
Side One
| No. | Title | Length |
|---|---|---|
| 1. | "Glue" | 1:19 |
| 2. | "Forced Down Your Throat" | 1:32 |
| 3. | "Get It Away" | 2:46 |

Side Two
| No. | Title | Length |
|---|---|---|
| 4. | "Under the Influence" | 1:32 |
| 5. | "Nothing Done" | 1:07 |
| 6. | "X-Claim" | 1:27 |
| 7. | "No Reply" (Buzzcocks cover) | 2:06 |
| Total length: | | 11:19 |

== Personnel ==
- Springa – vocals
- Al Barile – guitar
- Francois Levesque – guitar
- Jaime Sciarappa – bass
- Chris Foley – drums
