= Sex, Sin, and Zen =

2010 book by Brad Warner

Sex, Sin, and Zen: A Buddhist Exploration of Sex from Celibacy to Polyamory and Everything in Between
- Author: Brad Warner
- Cover artist: Harvey Pekar
- Language: English
- Subject: Sōtō Zen Buddhism
- Publisher: New World Library
- Publication date: August 21, 2010
- Publication place: United States
- Media type: Print
- Pages: 304
- ISBN: 978-1-57731-910-8
- Preceded by: Zen Wrapped in Karma Dipped in Chocolate
- Followed by: Death to All Monsters!

Sex, Sin, and Zen: A Buddhist Exploration of Sex from Celibacy to Polyamory and Everything in Between is a book written by Zen priest and punk rock bassist Brad Warner. The book is an exploration of sex from a modern Zen Buddhist perspective. It alternates between practical chapters and more arcane, conceptual ones.

The book also features an interview with porn star Nina Hartley, who was raised in Berkeley, California, by two Zen Buddhists.

== Reception ==
The book received mostly positive reviews. Publishers Weekly said of the book, "The subject is as fundamental as the human sex drive, which does not go away as one spends time on the cushion...Kudos to Warner for tackling the subject."

The book has been seen as being alternatively too positive towards polyamory and too critical of it.

== Publication data ==
- Sex, Sin, and Zen: A Buddhist Exploration of Sex from Celibacy to Polyamory and Everything in Between. New World Library. 2010. ISBN 978-1-57731-910-8.
