= Back & Gacked =

Back & Gacked EP

EP by Gang Green
- Released: May 6, 1997
- Recorded: December 1996
- Studio: Capertown Sound, Boston, Massachusetts
- Genre: Hardcore punk
- Length: 12:40
- Label: Taang Records
- Producer: Dave Minehan, Walter Gustafson, Chris Doherty

Gang Green chronology
King of Bands (1991)	Back & Gacked EP (1997)	Another Case of Brewtality (1997)

Professional ratings
Review scores
Source	Rating
VISIONS	8/12

Back & Gacked is an EP by American hardcore punk band Gang Green. It was released on May 6, 1997 on Taang Records.

It marked the band's first recordings in over five years–the last being two new tracks which were included in the compilation album, King of Bands in December, 1991.

The EP saw the return to the independent Taang Records label which had launched their career back in 1983 and also saw the return of drummer Walter Gustafson who had last appeared on Another Wasted Night in 1984. He had briefly returned to the band to stand in for Brian Betzger in 1991, but was not present for the King of Bands recording.

Mike Lucantonio and Kevin Brooks had since left the band and their positions were now filled by Mike Earls and Matt Sandonato, with Dave Minehan adding guitar parts as well as co-producing and mixing.

All but two of these tracks – "You Tucked It To Me" and "Deflect And Swerve" – made it onto their first full-length studio release since 1989's Older... Budweiser later that year, entitled Another Case of Brewtality.

== Overview ==
This EP saw not only the return of an old face in drummer Walter Gustafson and a return to their first record label, but also a return to the traditional hardcore sound which the band had built their reputation on throughout the 1980s.

It was a generally well-received batch of music and more was to come on the Another Case of Brewtality album, which covers this and extra material in more depth.

== Track listing ==
All tracks written by Chris Doherty and Walter Gustafson.

1. "Livin' In Oblivion" – 2:07
2. "Time To Pay" – 2:14
3. "You Tucked It To Me" – 3:07
4. "Here To Stay" – 1:12
5. "Accidental Overdose" – 2:07
6. "Deflect And Swerve" – 1:46

== Personnel ==
- Chris Doherty – vocals, guitar
- Michael Earls – guitar
- Matt Sandonato – bass
- Walter Gustafson – drums
- Dave Minehan – additional guitars
- Recorded in December, 1996 at Capertown Sound, Boston, Massachusetts
- Produced by Dave Minehan, Walter Gustafson, and Chris Doherty
- Mixed by Dave Minehan and Walter Gustafson
