= Another Wasted Night =

Studio album by Gang Green
- Released: 1986
- Genre: Hardcore punk
- Length: 28:26
- Label: Taang! Records
- Producers: A.C. Peters and Gang Green

Gang Green chronology
Another Wasted Night (1986)	You Got It (1987)

Professional ratings
Review scores
Source	Rating
AllMusic	4/5 stars

Another Wasted Night is the first full-length album from Boston hardcore punk band Gang Green. It is perhaps best remembered for their punk cover of the tune "Voices Carry", written by Aimee Mann for her band 'Til Tuesday.

== Background ==
In 1985 Chris Doherty reemerged with an all new Gang Green lineup consisting of former members of Smegma and the Nunz, D.A.M.M. (Drunks Against Mad Mothers) and The Freeze. This new lineup, which consisted of Chuck Stilphen (lead guitar), Glen Stilphen (bass, vocals) and Walter Gustafson (drums), is the most famous nationally as it was both the first to tour and the one that recorded the songs "Alcohol" and "Skate to Hell". This edition of Gang Green released the Another Wasted Night LP on Taang! Records in 1986, which is considered to be the band's best recording and is regarded as one of the definitive hardcore punk records of its time.

"Alcohol" has been covered numerous times. Tankard, a German thrash metal band, featured the song on their album Chemical Invasion. Impaled Nazarene, a black metal band from Finland, included it on their EP entitled Motörpenis which was released in 1996. Boston punkrock band Dropkick Murphys covered the song on their "Back to the Hub" 7 inch, and also included it on their live album Live on St. Patrick's Day from Boston, MA. The Meatmen covered it on their album Pope on a Rope. Swedish band No Fun at All covered the song on their album No Straight Angles (US edition), and Metallica have been known to play the song live. The song also appears on the soundtrack of the 2010 film Jackass 3D, as well as during Dave England's "Bareback base jumping" stunt in 2011's Jackass 3.5.

== Original US Release ==
- All songs written by Gang Green, unless stated

=== Side One ===
1. "Haunted House (Live)" (cassette only)
2. "Another Wasted Night" – 2:27
3. "Skate to Hell" – 1:51
4. "Voices Carry" (Aimee Mann) – 3:28
5. "Last Chance" – 2:17

=== Side Two ===
1. "Alcohol" – 2:09
2. "19th Hole" – 2:57
3. "Hate" – 1:06
4. "Have Fun" – 0:56
5. "L. D. S. B." (cassette only)

== German release ==
The album was re-issued in Germany on the Funhouse record label in 1987 with a different sleeve and a different track sequence. All 8 tracks from the original album were included along with 4 additional tracks.

=== Side one ===
1. "Another Wasted Night" – 2:28
2. "Skate to Hell" – 1:51
3. "Last Chance" – 2:14
4. "Alcohol" – 2:10
5. "Have Fun" – 1:05
6. "19th Hole" – 3:00

=== Side two ===
1. "Skate Hate" (aka "Hate") - 1:07
2. "Let's Drink Some Beer" (aka "L.D.S.B.") (Doherty, D Barret)
3. "Protect and Serve" - 0:51
4. "Another Bomb" (Chris Doherty)
5. "Voices Carry" (Aimee Mann) - 3:34
6. "Sold Out Alabama" - 2:23

== CD Re-Issue ==
The 1991 CD re-issue of the album included all 8 tracks from the original US release, plus 2 of the extra tracks from the German release, and another 5 additional tracks, including a different version of "Voices Carry" re-titled "Voices Scary". Once again, the tracks were in a completely different sequence.

The track entitled "Fuck In A" comprises just a single guitar chord along with a drumstick intro, with the whole thing lasting just 8 seconds. The untitled final track on the CD is outtakes from the recording session for "Fuck In A".

This CD would later be issued as disc 1 of the "Taang Years" compilation.

Track list

1. "19th Hole" - 2:46
2. "Alcohol" - 2:03
3. "Another Wasted Night" - 2:21
4. "Voices Carry" (Aimee Mann) - 3:34
5. "Protect and Serve" - 0:51
6. "Eight Ball" - 2:44
7. "Evil" - 2:33
8. "Last Chance" - 2:07
9. "Fuck In A" - 0:08
10. "Tonight We Rock" - 2:47
11. "Sold Out Alabama" - 2:23
12. "Have Fun" - 0:55
13. "Crocadile Rock" (sic) (Elton John, Bernie Taupin) - 2:11
14. "Hate" - 1:07
15. "Skate To Hell" - 1:46
16. "Voices Scary" (Aimee Mann) - 4:36
17. "Fuck In A" (outtakes) - 1:12

== Personnel ==
- Chris Doherty – vocals, guitar
- Chuck Stilphen – guitar
- Glen Stilphen – bass
- Brian Betzger – drums (19th Hole, Have Fun)
- Walter Gustafson – drums (rest of the tracks)

== Reception ==
- "While it might not be a masterpiece, this record is critical for fans of the band and early East Coast hardcore and punk." (Jason Anderson, Allmusic)
- The album "attracted a cult following that grew steadily over the next few years" (Kerry Purcell, Boston Herald)
- The Boston Phoenix and WFNX placed the album at #19 in their "Boston Rocks" 1986 "Top 50" album chart.
