= Break It Up (SSD album) =

Studio album by SSD
- Released: November 1985
- Recorded: October-November 1984
- Studios: Radio Beat (Boston, MA)
- Genre: Heavy metal
- Length: 43:57
- Label: Homestead
- Producers: Lou Giordano, SSD; assisted by Mike Bastarche

SSD chronology
How We Rock (1984)	Break It Up (1985)

Professional ratings
Review scores
Source	Rating
AllMusic	2.5/5 stars

Break It Up was the fourth and final release from Boston band SSD. It saw the band delve further into the heavy metal genre, leaving behind their punk and hardcore roots.

== Track listing ==
- All lyrics by Springa, Francois Levesque and Alan Barile. All music by Francois Levesque and Alan Barile. Arranged by SSD.

=== Side A ===
1. "Break It Up" (3:19)
2. "Children Will Rock" (3:46)
3. "Heart Failure" (4:35)
4. "Hit the Bottom" (4:28)
5. "Blood Flood" (5:07)

=== Side B ===
1. "No Solution" (4:17)
2. "Baby Black" (3:49)
3. "Calendar" (5:27)
4. "Screams of the Night" (4:58)
5. "Feel the Flame" (4:11)

== Personnel ==
- Springa – vocals
- Al Barile – guitar
- Francois Levesque – guitar
- Jaime Sciarappa – bass
- Chris Foley – drums
