= Boston Rock =

Defunct entertainment magazine

- 47th issue cover, December 1983.
- Editor in chief: Billie Best
- Art Director: Nancy Harrington
- Former editors: Greg A. Reibman
- Categories: Music magazine
- Format: Tabloid
- Publisher: Michael Dreese
- Founder: Michael Dreese
- Founded: 1980
- First issue: June 1980; 46 years ago
- Final issue Number: February 1987; 83
- Company: Boston Rock Inc.
- Country: United States
- Based in: Cambridge, Massachusetts
- Language: English
- ISSN: 0889-230X

Boston Rock was a tabloid format entertainment magazine published in Boston, Massachusetts. Its focus, as stated on the cover was: fashion, style, and entertainment. The main focus was on the local music scene and indie rock.

== History and profile ==
Mike Dreese founded Newbury Comics in Boston in 1978, and started selling music when a friend brought in his record collection to sell. Newbury Comics quickly became one of the region's leading record retail specialist during the punk and new wave movement; and by 1982 a second location was opened in Harvard Square. In early 1980, Dreese founded Boston Rock magazine and co-founded Modern Method Records, an imprint to Boston's emerging punk scene. Dreese now serves on the boards of the National Association of Recording Merchandisers (NARM), as well as Berklee College of Music and is currently a partner in Subversion Media, a Boston-based High Definition music video production firm. Tristam Lozaw, now a writer for the Boston Herald and contributor to Rolling Stone, became the editor in the early 1990s.

The first issue of Boston Rock was published in June 1980, and the final was reported in February 1987, though publication continued through at least 1993. Through its history the magazine interviewed cutting-edge culture icons like Zippy comic's Bill Griffith, Ace of Hearts Records founder Rick Harte, The Cure's Robert Smith, Night Flight's Stuart Samuels, Spin magazine founder Bob Guccione, Jr., the first US new wave promotion company Rockpool and New Music Seminar founder Mark Josephson, The Cars' Ric Ocasek, The B-52's Kate Pierson, U2's Bono, The Clash's Joe Strummer and Bernie Rhodes, Greg Kihn, Plasmatics; as well as covering the music of John Lydon, Rich Parsons, Troggs, Suicide, Winter Hours, The Bodeans, Art of Noise, The Go-Go's, Nervous Eaters, Pere Ubu, Mission of Burma, Devo, Ramones, Mekons, Au Pairs, Billy Idol, OMD, The Cramps, Black Flag, The Pretenders; The Psychedelic Furs; Squeeze; Killing Joke; David Johansen; Tom Petty; Joan Jett, New Order Birdsongs of the Mesozoic, The Alarm, The Shaggs, til Tuesday, Rain Parade, Green On Red, Saccharine Trust, Run-D.M.C., Leaving Trains, and Tiny Tim; just to name a few.
