= Another Case of Brewtality =

Studio album by Gang Green
- Released: October 7, 1997
- Recorded: December 1996
- Studio: Capertown Sound, Boston, Massachusetts
- Genre: Hardcore punk
- Length: 45:05
- Label: Taang! Records
- Producer: Dave Minehan, Walter Gustafson, Chris Doherty

Gang Green chronology
Back & Gacked EP (1997)	Another Case of Brewtality (1997)	Preschool (1997)

Professional ratings
Review scores
Source	Rating
AllMusic	4.5/5 stars

Another Case of Brewtality is the fourth full-length album from American hardcore punk band Gang Green. It was released on October 7, 1997, by Taang Records.

It follows hotly on the heels of an EP, Back & Gacked, which the band produced only five months previous. It contains 23 tracks, of which six were on the EP.

It was the band's first full-length studio album since 1989's Older... Budweiser, and features drummer Walter Gustafson – who had left the band in 1984 and subsequently returned in 1991 to temporarily cover Brian Betzger.

Since Mike Lucantonio and Kevin Brooks had left the band after two new tracks were recorded for the King of Bands compilation, a new guitarist – Mike Earls – and bassist – Matt Sandonato – were found to play on this album.

It was also the band's first full-length release for Taang Records since 1986's Another Wasted Night. On the same day, Taang also re-released all their early material – from 1981 to 1983 – on a CD called Preschool.

== Overview ==
The lyrics on Another Case of Brewtality revert from the socio-political stance on Older... Budweiser to the band's earlier subject matter of drinking, partying, and womanizing. The songs are generally short and fast-paced with one track falling headlong into another, and changes in tempo are frequent. A cover version of a Stiff Little Fingers song, "Suspect Device", is present. The song "Out On The Couch" has been used on several episodes by the Blowing Smoke with Twisted Rico Podcast.

== Track listing ==
All tracks are written by Chris Doherty and Walter Gustafson, except where noted.

No.	Title	Length
1.	"Eviction Party"	1:10
2.	"Wash the Blood"	2:19
3.	"Break the Bottle"	2:05
4.	"Hole in the Road"	2:01
5.	"Death of the Party"	2:30
6.	"I Missed It"	1:04
7.	"Beach Whistle"	3:50
8.	"Don't You Know"	1:42
9.	"Tricked into Bed Again"	1:47
10.	"Denied"	1:00
11.	"This Job Sucks" (Doherty, Matt Sandonato, Sweet, Mark Weiss)	2:10
12.	"Out on the Couch" (Doherty, Sandonato, Sweet, Weiss)	2:10
13.	"Weekend Millionaire" (Doherty, Sandonato, Gustafson)	2:45
14.	"I'll Worry About It Monday"	2:37
15.	"Time to Pay"	2:14
16.	"Say Good Buy"	2:00
17.	"Livin' in Oblivion"	2:02
18.	"Accidental Overdose"	2:09
19.	"6000 Crucified Slaves" (Doherty, Gustafson, Dave Connolly)	2:11
20.	"Suspect Device" (Fingers, Ogilvie, cover of Stiff Little Fingers)	2:12
21.	"Penalty Box"	1:02
22.	"To the Point"	0:55
23.	"Here to Stay"	1:13

== Personnel ==
- Chris Doherty – vocals, guitar
- Mike Earls – guitar
- Matt Sandonato – bass
- Walter Gustafson – drums
- Dave Minehan – additional guitar on tracks 9, 12, and 13
- Dave Connolly – lead vocals on "6,000 Crucified Slaves"
- Recorded December 1996 at Capertown Sound, Boston, Massachusetts
- Produced and engineered by Dave Minehan, Walter Gustafson, and Chris Doherty
- Mixed by Dave Minehan and Walter Gustafson
