= This Is Boston, Not L.A. =

1982 compilation album

Compilation album by various artists
- Released: May 1982
- Studios: Radiobeat; Oak Grove; Newbury Sound
- Genre: Hardcore punk
- Length: 36:46
- Language: English
- Label: Modern Method
- Producers: Michel Bastarache; Jimmy Dufour

Professional ratings
Review scores
Source	Rating
AllMusic	4/5 stars

This Is Boston, Not L.A. is a hardcore punk compilation released in 1982. It is considered the definitive album from the Boston hardcore scene, as several of its most prominent bands appear on the record, namely, Jerry's Kids, the Proletariat, the Groinoids, the F.U.'s, Gang Green, Decadence, and the Freeze. For them, with the exception of the latter, This Is Boston, Not L.A. was also their debut release. Al Barile's band, SSD, were asked to contribute, but they refused to participate.

The album was named after its closing track, the eponymous song by the Freeze:

If you dance the same and dress the same
It won't be long 'til you are the same
You look the same and act the same
There's nothing new and you're to blame
This is Boston, not L.A.
This is Boston, fuck L.A.

—The Freeze, "This Is Boston, Not L.A." lyrics

According to Clif Hanger, vocalist for the Freeze, the title song was written not to insult Los Angeles scene, but to encourage other Boston acts to find their own unique, local sound rather than emulate other bands from other areas. However, Boston audiences often took away a different meaning. They assumed the song asserted Boston's superiority to Los Angeles.

The album's front cover features a black-and-white image of a mosh pit, taken by Bostonian punk photographer Phil In Phlash.

This Is Boston, Not L.A. would be followed up a few months later by a six-song complementary record, the Unsafe at Any Speed EP. (Note: Modern Method #MM 014)

== Release ==
Consisting of only previously unreleased material, This Is Boston, Not L.A. was originally released in May 1982, as LP (Note: Modern Method #MM 012) and Compact Cassette, on Modern Method Records. A second vinyl pressing of the album would be released later that same year.

== Critical reception ==
Writing contemporaneously in The Boston Phoenix, Doug Simmons said that "crudely put, our punk scene is a pimple compared to California’s festering wounds. What's even more dehabilitating [sic], as Cliff Hanger points out, is that Boston hardcore lacks even the force of originality. Shaved skulls, scrawled-on T-shirts, and heavy boots have become just one more uniform. Still, I find hope in This is Boston, Not L.A. Jerry's Kids, the Groinoids (defunct), the F.U.’s, Decadence (ditto), and Gang Green may all be Circle Jerkoffs in terms of sound (raw, fast, brief, mean), but many songs strike a nerve."

In his review for AllMusic, Alex Henderson said:

"... in the late '70s and early '80s. While Los Angeles, New York, and San Francisco were famous for their punk scenes, Boston's punk scene didn't enjoy nearly as much publicity. But make no mistake: Boston was a punk hotbed back then, and Modern Method Records tried to spread the word with this obscure but excellent compilation ... This Is Boston, Not L.A. ... paints an impressive picture of the Beantown punks who were active during that era."

== Unsafe at Any Speed EP ==
Unsafe at Any Speed

EP by various artists
- Released: Late summer 1982
- Genre: Hardcore punk
- Length: 11:48
- Language: English
- Label: Modern Method

A few months after releasing This Is Boston, Not L.A., Modern Method issued a follow-up companion record, the 7-inch EP titled Unsafe at Any Speed, featuring one unreleased song apiece from six of the bands which had appeared on the original compilation.

Also featuring a Phil In Phlash's photograph of a mosh pit, and bold typography, the record's front cover is of a similar design to that on the original album.

The tracks that make up the EP resurfaced in 1995 as the last six songs on the CD re-release of This Is Boston, Not L.A. (Note: Wicked Disc #WIC 1001-2)

=== Track listing ===
Side A
No.	Title	Artist	Length
1.	"Selfish"	Gang Green	1:44
2.	"Empty Skull"	Groinoids	1:18
3.	"Voodoo Economics"	The Proletariat	2:51

Side B
No.	Title	Artist	Length
1.	"Machine Gun"	Jerry's Kids	1:17
2.	"CETA Suckers"	The F.U.'s	0:57
3.	"Refrigerator Heaven"	The Freeze	3:41
Total length:			11:48

== Influence ==
After the record's release, Boston natives took to mocking the title with T-shirts that proclaimed in large type: "This is L.A. (Lower Allston), not Boston" in reference to Allston, Massachusetts. In the early to mid-1980s, the T-shirt appropriately mimicked the NBA rivalry between the Boston Celtics and Los Angeles Lakers.

The Boston-based ska-punk band Big D and the Kids Table printed T-shirts referencing the song and compilation. They featured "L.A" with a strike through it on the front and "This is Boston Not L.A." on the back. South shore pop-punk band A Loss for Words also made shirts that featured a modified version of the Celtics logo and the same saying on the reverse side. This alludes to both the compilation and the Celtics' victory in the 1984 NBA Finals.

In 1994 Zafio Records released the This is Berkeley Not West Bay 4-way split EP with Black Fork, Dead and Gone, Screw 32 and AFI on it. As a response, in 2000 the Amsterdam-based Kangaroo Records label released the compilation EP This is Kangaroo Not Berkely, with 12 bands from different countries playing 'straight forward hardcore. Like the way it SHOULD be.'

The compilation was mentioned by the punk rock band NOFX on their song "We Got Two Jealous Agains", featured on their album The War on Errorism, released in 2003. A verse of the lyrics reads: "But when I saw Christ on Parade, and This is Boston, Not LA, I knew you were the one".

In 2012, appeared an unlabeled self-released EP titled This Is Boston and S.J., displaying on its cover art the same photograph and graphic style of the 1982 LP, but instead of it saying "Not L.A.", it's crossed off and says "and S.J.". Hostage and Swamps from Massachusetts share the record with Bad Times Crew, and True Hearted from San Jose, California.

== Reissues ==
In October 1995, This Is Boston, Not L.A. was re-released as a remastered CD on Newbury Comics' in-house record label Wicked Disc, a short-lived follow-up to the demised Modern Method Records. This edition included, as bonus tracks, the entire Unsafe at Any Speed EP.

On July 29, 2016, Newbury Comics re-released the album as a limited repressing of 1,500 copies on colored vinyl, in four different design variations.

== Track listings ==
In the original LP from 1982, "Straight Jacket" is spelled "Strait Jacket" on the side A disc label and on the inner sleeve, while "I Don't Know" appears as "I Don't Care" on the back cover and on the side B disc label, and "This Is Boston, Not L.A." is shortened to "Boston not L.A." on the back cover and on the side B disc label. In the Compact Cassette version, also from 1982, "I Don't Know" appears as "I Don't Care", and "This Is Boston, Not L.A." is shortened to "Boston not L.A."

=== 1982 LP and MC release ===
Side A
No.	Title	Writer(s)	Artist	Length
1.	"Straight Jacket"	Rick Jones	Jerry's Kids	0:27
2.	"Uncontrollable"	R. Jones	Jerry's Kids	0:50
3.	"Wired"	R. Jones	Jerry's Kids	1:22
4.	"Desperate"	Bob Cenci	Jerry's Kids	1:15
5.	"Pressure"	Dave Aronson	Jerry's Kids	1:25
6.	"I Don't Wanna"	Cenci	Jerry's Kids	1:25
7.	"Options"	Richard Brown, The Proletariat	The Proletariat	2:00
8.	"Religion Is the Opium of the Masses"	Brown, The Proletariat	The Proletariat	2:14
9.	"Allegiance"	Frank Michaels, The Proletariat	The Proletariat	1:39
10.	"Angel"	Mongoloid, Groinoids	Groinoids	1:06
11.	"Preskool Dropouts"	John Sox, Peter Cristofono	The F.U.'s	1:32
12.	"Radio UNIX USA"	Steve Grimes	The F.U.'s	1:01
13.	"Green Beret" (version)	Robin Moore, Barry Sadler	The F.U.'s	1:39
14.	"Time Is Money"	Bob Furapples, Grimes	The F.U.'s	0:20

Side B
No.	Title	Writer(s)	Artist	Length
1.	"Snob"	Chris Doherty	Gang Green	0:26
2.	"Lie Lie"	Doherty, Mike Dean	Gang Green	0:33
3.	"I Don't Know"	Doherty	Gang Green	1:01
4.	"Rabies"	Doherty, Dean	Gang Green	1:26
5.	"Narrow Mind"	Doherty	Gang Green	0:41
6.	"Kill a Commie"	Doherty, Dean	Gang Green	1:07
7.	"Have Fun"	Doherty	Gang Green	0:54
8.	"Slam"	Jonathan Anastas	Decadence	1:31
9.	"Broken Bones"	C. Croce	The Freeze	1:31
10.	"Idiots at Happy Hour"	Croce	The Freeze	0:58
11.	"Now or Never"	Rob DeCradle, Croce	The Freeze	0:39
12.	"Sacrifice Not Suicide"	Croce	The Freeze	1:08
13.	"It's Only Alcohol"	DeCradle, Croce	The Freeze	1:24
14.	"Trouble If You Hide"	DeCradle, Croce	The Freeze	2:49
15.	"Time Bomb"	Croce	The Freeze	1:58
16.	"This Is Boston, Not L.A."	Croce	The Freeze	0:25
Total length:				36:46

=== 1995 remastered CD edition ===
Track 36 hides an untitled looped version of the final line of the title song: "This is Boston" is heard once, "fuck L.A." is the loop.

No.	Title	Artist	Length
1.	"Straight Jacket"	Jerry's Kids	0:28
2.	"Uncontrollable"	Jerry's Kids	0:51
3.	"Wired"	Jerry's Kids	1:22
4.	"Desperate"	Jerry's Kids	1:17
5.	"Pressure"	Jerry's Kids	1:26
6.	"I Don't Wanna"	Jerry's Kids	1:25
7.	"Options"	The Proletariat	2:01
8.	"Religion Is the Opium of the Masses"	The Proletariat	2:14
9.	"Allegiance"	The Proletariat	1:38
10.	"Angel"	Groinoids	1:07
11.	"Preskool Dropouts"	The F.U.'s	1:32
12.	"Radio UNIX USA"	The F.U.'s	1:01
13.	"Green Beret"	The F.U.'s	1:38
14.	"Time Is Money"	The F.U.'s	0:21
15.	"Snob"	Gang Green	0:27
16.	"Lie Lie"	Gang Green	0:36
17.	"I Don't Know"	Gang Green	1:03
18.	"Rabies"	Gang Green	1:27
19.	"Narrow Mind"	Gang Green	0:44
20.	"Kill a Commie"	Gang Green	1:08
21.	"Have Fun"	Gang Green	0:54
22.	"Slam"	Decadence	1:30
23.	"Broken Bones"	The Freeze	1:32
24.	"Idiots at Happy Hour"	The Freeze	0:59
25.	"Now or Never"	The Freeze	0:39
26.	"Sacrifice Not Suicide"	The Freeze	1:08
27.	"It's Only Alcohol"	The Freeze	1:23
28.	"Trouble If You Hide"	The Freeze	2:46
29.	"Time Bomb"	The Freeze	1:57
30.	"This Is Boston, Not L.A."	The Freeze	0:25

Bonus tracks: Unsafe at Any Speed EP
No.	Title	Writer(s)	Artist	Length
31.	"Selfish"	Chris Doherty	Gang Green	1:47
32.	"Empty Skull"	Mongoloid, Groinoids	Groinoids	1:20
33.	"Voodoo Economics"	Richard Brown, The Proletariat	The Proletariat	2:49
34.	"Machine Gun"	Rick Jones	Jerry's Kids	1:20
35.	"CETA Suckers"	Steve Grimes	The F.U.'s	0:59
36.	"Refrigerator Heaven"	C. Croce, The Freeze	The Freeze	8:27
Total length:				53:41

== Personnel ==
Jerry's Kids

- Bryan Jones – vocals
- Bob Cenci – guitar
- Dave Aronson – guitar
- Rick Jones – bass
- Brian Betzger – drums

The Proletariat

- Richard Brown – vocals
- Frank Michaels – guitar
- Peter Bevilacqua – bass, backing vocals
- Tom McKnight – drums

Groinoids

- Mongoloid – vocals
- Rico Petroleum – guitar
- Fetuchini (aka Cheesely) – bass
- Red-Squirts (aka Big Daddy) – drums, horn

The F.U.'s

- John Sox – vocals
- Steve Grimes – guitar, vocals
- Joe Rockhead – bass
- Bob Furapples – drums
- The John Wayne Memorial "Lick-the-Big-C" Boys' Choir – choir in "Green Beret"

Gang Green

- Chris Doherty – guitar, vocals
- Bill Manley – bass, vocals
- Mike Dean – drums

Decadence

- Eric Wilkinson – vocals
- Glenn Norton – guitar
- Jon Anastas – bass
- Wright Manley – drums

The Freeze

- Clif "Hanger" Croce – vocals
- Rob DeCradle – guitar
- Rick Andrews – bass
- Lou Cataldo – drums

Production

- Michel Bastarache (pka Mr. B) – production (tracks A1 to A6, B1 to B7)
- Jimmy Dufour – production (A7, A8), co-production (A9, A11 to A14), engineering (A1 to A10, B1 to B7) (Note: At Radiobeat Studios in Boston, Massachusetts.)
- The Freeze – production (B9 to B16)
- Lou Giordano – co-production (A9), engineering (A1 to A6, A11 to A14, B1 to B7)
- Frank Michaels – co-production (A9)
- Jay Snow – co-production (A10)
- Groinoids – co-production (A10)
- The F.U.'s – co-production (A11 to A14)
- Nasty – co-production (B8)
- Grub the Great – co-production (B8)
- Emir Galevi – engineering (B9) (Note: At Oak Grove Studio in Malden, Massachusetts.)
- Ken Kanavous – engineering (B10 to B16) (Note: At Newbury Sound in Boston, Massachusetts.)
- Phil In Phlash – photography

Additional production (1995 remastered CD edition)

- Mark McKay – editing
- Sean Sweeney – editing
- Henk Kooistra – remastering (Note: At 9 West Mastering in Marlborough, Massachusetts.)
- Joe Cuneo – remastering (assistance)
- Michel Bastarache (pka Mr. B) – technical assistance, illustration (flyers), liner notes
- Rachel Kieserman – illustration (assistance)
- Jack Kelly – illustration (flyers)
- Mike Gitter (from xXx Fanzine) – liner notes
