= Soma Holiday (the Proletariat album) =

Album by The Proletariat

Studio album by the Proletariat
- Released: 1983
- Recorded: March 1982 –
- Studio: Radiobeat
- Genres: Hardcore punk; post-punk; noise rock; art punk
- Length: 39:30
- Language: English
- Labels: Non-U; Radiobeat
- Producers: Jimmy Dufour; Lou Giordano; Frank Michaels

The Proletariat chronology
Distortion (1982)	Soma Holiday (1983)	Marketplace (1985)

Professional ratings
Review scores
Source	Rating
Robert Christgau	B+

Soma Holiday is the second release and the first studio album by American punk rock band the Proletariat. It was also the debut output for Radiobeat Records.

The record was named after the drug used to control society in Aldous Huxley's novel Brave New World.

== Production and release ==
Produced by Jimmy Dufour, Lou Giordano and Frank Michaels, Soma Holiday was recorded and mixed at Radiobeat Studios in Boston, Massachusetts. Bill Kipper was in charge of the mastering of the album at Masterdisk in New York City.

The record includes the songs "Splendid Wars", "Events/Repeat", "Blind", and "Torn Curtain", which were originally featured on the band's debut EP Distortion, (Note: Non-U Records) a limited edition seven-track cassette tape self-released the previous year.

Soma Holiday was originally co-released in 1983, as LP, on band's Non-U label (Note: Non-U #NON-U 01) and Radiobeat Records. (Note: Radiobeat #RB 001) A second pressing of the album would be released later that same year.

== Critical reception ==
In a contemporary review of the album, Joyce Millman, music critic at The Boston Phoenix, wrote:

"... Soma Holiday ... is a hefty 18-song manifesto ... on class warfare and economic inequality ... [with] frequent midsong tempo changes ... from martial punk to bouncing-off-the-wall hardcore. The record ... spotlights the nuances that often get swept up into the band's whirling live sound. Michaels, for instance, emerges as a guitarist who combines flash and restraint [on an album] built on a [hardcore] foundation of gurgling bass and rifle-range drumming, that varies little from track to track [over which his] leads and solos (18 of 'em all different) glow with imaginative detail ... That kind of invigorated playing bolsters Brown's dry, [protest] lyrics ... anchored in slogans ... rather than images [at the risk of] rhetorical overkill ... Brown may be a taciturn lyricist, but he's a demonically frenetic singer who employs an arsenal of orator's tricks ... Soma Holiday ... chronicles a band that's growing wiser and more proficient while losing none of its original commitment..."

Around the same time, Jeff Bale from Maximumrocknroll, was of the view that:

"A lot of Boston bands sound great, but few--if any--have the political sophistication displayed by the Proletariat on their debut album. I would liken them to the early Gang of Four, both musically and ideologically, though the comparison shouldn't be overdrawn. They create equally complex structures, but they replace Gang of Four's sparseness with a full-bodied sound and punky guitar power ... A fabulous record that renews my faith in Bosstown."

== Distortion EP ==
Distortion

EP by the Proletariat
- Released: July 1982
- Recorded: November 1981 – March 1982
- Studio: Radiobeat
- Genres: Hardcore punk; post-punk; noise rock; art punk
- Length: 13:45
- Language: English
- Label: Non-U
- Producer: Jimmy Dufour

The Proletariat chronology
Distortion (1982)	Soma Holiday (1983)

Distortion is a seven-song EP and the first stand-alone release by the Proletariat. It was issued in July 1982 on the band's own label, Non-U Records, as a limited edition single-sided C46 cassette tape.

The EP is composed of songs recorded in three separate sessions at Radiobeat Studios in Boston, Massachusetts with producer Jimmy Dufour: "After the Rise" was recorded in November 1981 with Jimmy Johnson as audio engineer, "Westernization" was engineered by Dufour himself in January 1982, whereas the rest of the tracks were laid down in March 1982 with recording engineer Lou Giordano.

The songs "Torn Curtain", "Splendid Wars", "Blind", and "Events/Repeat" would be re-released the following year on the band's first studio album Soma Holiday. (Note: Non-U #NON-U 01 / Radiobeat #RB 001)

The tracks "After the Rise", "White Hands", and "Westernization" would not be reissued until 1998, when they were included on the band's anthology Voodoo Economics and Other American Tragedies. (Note: Taang! #TAANG! 127)

The cover and label art were designed by graphic artist Pickles. The insert liner notes sheet was created by Frank Michaels and Richard Brown. The EP's artwork includes a reproduction of Dorothea Lange's photo Migrant Mother (1936).

=== Track listing ===
Music, lyrics, and arrangements by the Proletariat.

Side A: Distortion
No.	Title	Length
1.	"Torn Curtain"	1:42
2.	"Splendid Wars (Myth)"	1:42
3.	"After the Rise"	2:42
4.	"Blind"	1:49
5.	"Events/Repeat"	1:56
6.	"White Hands"	1:15
7.	"Westernization"	2:39

Side B: (Blank side)
No.	Title	Length
Total length:		13:45

== Reissues ==
Long out of print in its original form, Soma Holiday was re-released, in its entirety, as part of the band's 2-CD anthology Voodoo Economics and Other American Tragedies, (Note: Taang! #TAANG! 127) compiled in 1998 by Taang! Records.

In October 1999, apparently under license from the band, the album was reissued in cassette-only format, (Note: Social Napalm #SNR 1) featuring alternate cover art, on Social Napalm Records, a small DIY label based in Chelmsford, Massachusetts.

On October 21, 2016, 33 years after its debut, Soma Holiday was re-released for the first time in its original vinyl format, on Sacramento-based label Ss Records; (Note: Ss #SS085) which also simultaneously released the album for the first time on CD.

== Track listing ==
Music by Peter Bevilacqua and Frank Michaels, lyrics by Richard Brown, except where noted. Arrangements by the Proletariat.

Side A
No.	Title	Lyrics	Length
1.	"Decorations"		3:04
2.	"Splendid Wars (Myth)"		1:42
3.	"Famine"		1:54
4.	"Embraced"		2:36
5.	"Events/Repeat"		1:56
6.	"Another Banner Raised"	Frank Michaels	1:42
7.	"Hollow Victory"		2:44
8.	"Condition"		2:09
9.	"Avoidance"		1:55

Side B
No.	Title	Lyrics	Length
1.	"Pictures"		2:46
2.	"Bread and Circus"		2:08
3.	"Blind"		1:49
4.	"Subsidized"		3:22
5.	"Torn Curtain"		1:32
6.	"Purge"	Michaels	2:40
7.	"Scars"		1:37
8.	"Decide on Change"	Peter Bevilacqua	1:36
9.	"No Lesser of Evils"		2:18
Total length:			39:30

== Personnel ==
The Proletariat

- Richard Brown – vocals, cowbell (track A7)
- Frank Michaels – guitar, backing vocals
- Peter Bevilacqua – bass, backing vocals
- Tom McKnight – drums

Additional performers

- Mick Miller – backing vocals (A4)
- Lou Giordano – backing vocals (A9)
- Jimmy Dufour – backing vocals (A9)

Production

- Jimmy Dufour - production (A2, A5, B3, B5), co-production, co-engineering
- Lou Giordano - co-production, engineering (A2, A5, B3, B5), co-engineering
- Frank Michaels - co-production, sleeve concept
- Mick Miller – engineering (assistance)
- Bill Kipper – mastering
- Pickles – graphic design

Additional production (2016 remastered LP reissue)

- John Golden - remastering
- Dane Henas – graphic design (restoration)
