= The Freeze =

American punk rock band

- Origin: Cape Cod, Massachusetts, United States
- Genres: Hardcore punk, punk rock
- Years active: 1978–2026
- Labels: Modern Method, Taang! Records, Lost And Found, Dr Strange Records, Schizophrenic, Gummopunx Records
- Members: Clif "Hanger" Croce; Bill Close; Dave “DB” Barbee; Tom Reardon; Kaz McClain; Brandon Meunier
- Past members: Numerous (see 'Former members' section below)

The Freeze is an American punk rock band from Cape Cod, Massachusetts, United States, formed by a group of teenagers in 1978. They released the first single, "I Hate Tourists" in 1980 and contributed eight songs, including the title track to the 1982 hardcore punk compilation This Is Boston, Not L.A.

The band is known for their dark lyrics, original punk rock melodies, and their longevity. A lot of their early lyrics deal with alienation, drug-use/abuse and paranoia (especially of the church, government and those exercising authority over others in general). A constant theme or thread regarding apathetic observers or people willing to give up their freedoms for fear of losing their "security" is also apparent in their work.

== History ==
Influenced by The Ramones, The Clash and other early punk bands, Clif "Hanger" Croce put together The Freeze in 1978. A friend scraped up enough cash the next year to make 2,000 copies of the band's debut single, "I Hate Tourists". According to a band history, “A Christian group tried to ban it. The Boston Phoenix voted it one of the top 10 local singles of the year. It was fun." "I Hate Tourists" was released in 1980. The Freeze's music was picked by Newbury Comics' in-house label, Modern Method Records, which released several of the Freeze's songs on the Boston hardcore compilation albums Unsafe at Any Speed and This Is Boston, Not L.A. in 1982. The Freeze's title track for that album was used in a television commercial for Newbury Comics on local UHF music video station V66, with the song's penultimate word bleeped out. The band also re-recorded "No One's Ever Coming Home" for Flipside Vinyl Fanzine, Vol. 1, released by Gasatanka Records in 1984.

The 1983 album Land of the Lost and 1985's Rabid Reaction followed before Modern Method folded. The group was picked up by Taang! Records for their 1991 album, Misery Loves Company. The cover of their 1999 album, One False Move, featured fellow Cape Cod artist and author Edward Gorey.

Crawling Blind, an album released in 1994, told tales about people who were slaves to addiction. In 1996, the release Freak Show explored mental illness on songs such as "Creeping Psychosis" and "Suspended Heaven".

They released an album, One False Move, in March 1999.

After a twenty-year gap The Freeze released another album called Calling All Creatures on Slope Records, in 2019.

Lead singer Cliff "Hanger" Croce, passed away on October 17, 2026.

== Members ==
Band founder, songwriter, and vocalist Clif "Hanger" Croce is the only member that has been in every incarnation of the band, which has seen many line-up changes.

=== Current members ===
- Clif "Hanger" Croce — vocals
- Bill Close — guitar, vocals, bass
- Dave “DB” Barbee — guitar, vocals
- Brandon Meunier — guitar, vocals
- Tom Reardon — bass
- Kaz McClain-drums — vocals

=== Former members ===
- Queeny Curmudgeon Carmichael (AKA The Mudge-Man) — guitar, vocals, yipping, high octave yodeling, and legal consultant
- Dave “DB” Barbee — Guitar, Vocals
- Johnny Baxter — drums
- Rob (DeCradle) Rosenthal – guitar
- Pat Leonard — bass
- Eric Dewolf — bass
- Pat Brady — drums
- Paul Delano — guitar
- Scott Moulaison — drums, vocals
- Steve Wood — guitar
- Shane Mackie — guitar
- Rick Andrews — bass
- Marc Thalasitas — guitar, vocals
- Daniella Thalasitas — bass
- Craig Adams — bass
- Eric Short — guitar
- Joe Koonz — guitar and vocals
- Ronald Cormier — guitar
- Kevin Vicha ("Kev") — drums
- Lou "Chip" Cataldo — drums
- Walter Gustafson — drums
- Chuck Stilphen — guitar
- Mark Leonard — bass
- Chris Barone — drums
- Mikey Jak — bass
- Anthony Pizzo — guitar
- Patrick "Swedish" Souza — drums
- Slade Anderson — guitar
- John — guitar
- Molusk — bass guitar
- Jason Stone — drums
- Joshy Wastrel — guitar, vocals
- Gizz Lazlo — drums, vocals
- David Diamond — guitar
- Arvin Mani — bass
- Frank Anderson — drums
- Anthony Barbaria — drums
- Nick Govoni — bass
- Kevin Bonelli — guitar, bass
- Peter Soszynski - bass

== Discography ==
=== Studio albums ===
- Land of the Lost (1983)
- Rabid Reaction (1985)
- Misery Loves Company (1991)
- Crawling Blind (1994)
- Freak Show (1996)
- One False Move (1999)
- Calling All Creatures (2019)

=== Singles and EPs ===
- "I Hate Tourists" (1980)
- "Guilty Face EP" (1982)
- "PTP" (1991)
- "Bloodlights" (1991)
- "Welcome to Planet Earth" (1999)
- "Blood Flows Home" CD-EP (2011)
- "Someone's Bleeding" CD-EP (2015)

=== Split releases ===
- The Freeze and Straw Dogs 7" (1991)
- The Freeze and the Killrays CD (1995)
- A Deadly Duo 10" (w/ the Bollweevils) (1996)

=== Compilation appearances ===
- A Wicked Good Time: Vol. 2 (1981)
- This Is Boston, Not L.A. (1982)
- Unsafe at Any Speed (1983)
- Life is a Joke vol. 3 (1987)
- Revenge of the Kamikaze Stegosaurus From Outer Space (1988)
- Boston Wolfpack (1999)

=== Live recordings ===
- Five Way Fury LP (1992)
- The Freeze 11/2/96 7" (1996)
- Live at the Mill Hill Club in 1980 LP (2007)

=== Collections and reprints ===
- Guilty Face + 3 10" EP (1991)
- Double Dosed LP (1992)
- Token Bones LP (1997)
- Crawling Blind / Freak Show (CD, 2004) (LP, 2013)
