= Can't Live Without It =

Only live album release from American hardcore punk/speed metal band, Gang Green

Can't LIVE Without It

Live album by Gang Green
- Released: 1990
- Recorded: February 25, 1990
- Venue: Marquee Club (London, UK)
- Studio: The Manor Mobile
- Genre: Hardcore punk
- Length: 40:30
- Label: Roadrunner
- Producer: Tony Wilson

Gang Green chronology
Older... Budweiser (1989)	Can't LIVE Without It (1990)	King of Bands (1991)

Professional ratings
Review scores
Source	Rating
AllMusic	3/5 stars

Can't LIVE Without It is the only live album by American hardcore punk band Gang Green. It was recorded at The Marquee Club in London on February 25, 1990, and was released by Roadrunner Records later that year.

It features one line up change from their previous two albums – Josh Pappe had joined from fellow crossover thrash band, D.R.I., to replace Joe Gittleman who had been fired shortly after the release of the studio album, Older... Budweiser, in 1989.

After finishing a headline tour of Europe, of which this material was a part, Fritz Ericson retired, Josh Pappe got married, and long-term drummer, Brian Betzger decided to start a pool hall.

Far from finishing the band, Chris Doherty assembled some replacements, including Walter Gustafson who had left the band in 1984 – only to be replaced by Betzger again seven months later. They released one last album, a compilation called King of Bands with two newly recorded tracks, with new bass and guitar players, before a hiatus which lasted until 1997.

== Overview ==
If this was to be the band's last testament to a decade of thrash and punk, it had to assemble all the band's best tracks. The first side – tracks 1 to 8 – was mainly material from their three full-length studio albums, with the exception of "Have Fun" which was an early line-up creation.

The second side – tracks 9 to 15 – was mainly early material with a few tracks from You Got It and one from Older... Budweiser.

The production was fairly good and emphasised the band's ability to play at speed with some amount of precision.

== Track listing ==
All tracks written by Chris Doherty, except where noted.

1. "L.D.S.B." (Doherty, D Barret) – 1:30
2. "Bartender" – 3:10
3. "Lost Chapter" (Joe Gittleman, Doherty) – 3:09
4. "We'll Give It To You" – 3:11
5. "We Can Go" (Gittleman, Doherty) – 2:29
6. "Have Fun" – 0:51
7. "Last Chance" – 2:48
8. "Just One Bullet" (Doherty, Betzger) – 3:14
9. "Born To Rock" – 4:33
10. "Rabies" (Doherty, Mike Dean) – 1:12
11. "Voices Carry" (M Hausman, J Pesce, A Mann, R Holmes) – 3:19
12. "Sold Out" – 2:32
13. "Bedroom Of Doom" (Franz Ericson, Doherty) – 4:28
14. "Another Bomb" – 2:56
15. "Alcohol" (Doherty, Chuck Stilphen) – 2:21

== Personnel ==
- Chris Doherty – vocals, guitar
- Fritz Ericson – guitar
- Josh Pappe – bass
- Brian Betzger – drums
- Recorded February 25, 1990 at The Marquee Club, London, UK on the Manor Mobile
- Produced by Tony Wilson
- Engineered Mick McKenna
- Mixed February 26–27, 1990 at Wessex Studios, London
- Mastered by Tom Coyne at The Hit Factory, New York City, US
