= Sit Down and Shut Up =

2007 book by Brad Warner

Sit Down and Shut Up: Punk Rock Commentaries on Buddha, God, Truth, Sex, Death, & Dogen's Treasury of the Right Dharma Eye
- Author: Brad Warner
- Language: English
- Subject: Sōtō Zen Buddhism, Dogen
- Publisher: New World Library
- Publication date: April 28, 2007
- Media type: Print
- Pages: 255
- ISBN: 1-57731-559-6
- OCLC: 80020152
- Dewey Decimal: 294.3/85 22
- LC Class: BQ9288 .W377 2007
- Preceded by: Hardcore Zen

Sit Down and Shut Up: Punk Rock Commentaries on Buddha, God, Truth, Sex, Death, & Dogen's Treasury of the Right Dharma Eye is a book written by Brad Warner, an author and ordained Zen priest. The work serves as both an autobiography and an introduction to Dogen's (道元) work Shōbōgenzō (正法眼蔵), (Treasury of the Right Dharma Eye).

== Reception ==
The book received mixed reviews. MetroActive stated "At times Warner comes off as pandering, with his cutesy pop-culture tangents and I-know-what-you're-thinking-right-now comments" while Buddhadharma ultimately summed the book up with "Too much of an adolescent rant for most Zen readers and too much of a middle-aged strut down memory lane for most punk readers, Sit Down and Shut Up will likely get an enthusiastic reception only from the small group of readers who already identify as Zen punks." Razorcake, however, stated "Irreverent, cocksure, glib, and wise, this is one damn good book.". The book received positive reviews from EnlightenNext, Shambhala Sun, and Genji Press.

Warner himself noted that he received some criticism of his handling of polyamory in the book.

A certain number of the polyamory people have gotten on my case about it. I don't hear from them directly, but I made the huge mistake of reading my Amazon customer reviews recently, and there was someone there who complained that I'd completely misconstrued the philosophy of polyamory -- so there's that contingent. Then you've got a certain number of the more traditional Buddhist crowd, who've never even heard of polyamory, who think I take a much too positive view of it. I feel that if I'm somewhere in the middle of those two sets of opinions, I must be doing something right.

== Publication data ==
- Sit Down and Shut Up: Punk Rock Commentaries on Buddha, God, Truth, Sex, Death, & Dogen's Treasury of the Right Dharma Eye, Brad Warner, New World Library (May 2007), 255 pages, ISBN 1-57731-559-6
