= Modern Method Records =

Record label in Boston, Massachusetts

Modern Method Records was a record label that helped to document the Boston hardcore scene in the early 1980s. Modern Method was an offshoot of the Newbury Comics music retailer and also the Boston Rock magazine. The label was located at 268 Newbury ST. in Boston, Massachusetts.

== Discography ==
| catalog # | artist | title | format | year |
|---|---|---|---|---|
| MM LP1/ MD268 | various artists | We Had a Wicked Good Time | LP | 1981 |
| MM001 | Gremies | No Surfing in Dorchester Bay | 7" | 1980 |
| MM002 | Thrills | I'll Be the Heartbreaker | 7" | 1979 |
| MM003 | Uncommitted | Italy's Underground Economy | 7" | 1980 |
| MM004 | Boy's Life / The Outlets | Boy's Life vs. The Outlets | 7" | 1980 |
| MM005 | Bound and Gagged | Bound and Gagged | 12" | 1980 |
| MM006 | Pastiche | Lock It Up | 7" | 1981 |
| MM007 | Someone & The Somebodies | Bops on the Head | 12" | 1981 |
| MM008 | Future Dads | Dorchester Summer | 7" | 1981 |
| MM009 | New Models | Shattered Windows | 7" | 1981 |
| MM010 | Native Tongue | Native Tongue | 12" | 1981 |
| MM011 | various artists | A Wicked Good Time! Vol. 2 | LP | 1981 |
| MM012 | various artists | This Is Boston, Not L.A. | LP | 1982 |
| MM013 | The Outlets | Best Friends/ Bright Lights | 7" | 1982 |
| MM014 | various artists | Unsafe at Any Speed | 7" | 1982 |
| MM015 | November Group | November Group | LP | 1982 |
| MM016 | Someone & The Somebodies | Newvo | 7" | 1982 |
| MM017 | The Fabulous Billygoons | Rhapsody in Flatulence | LP | 1982 |
| MM018 | The Freeze | Guilty Face | 7" | 1983 |
| MM019 | Lou & The Kozmetix | Lou & The Kozmetix | LP | 1982 |
| MM020 | Native Tongue | Yowl | LP | 1983 |
| MM021 | The Freeze | Land of the Lost | LP | 1984 |
| MM022 | SSD | How We Rock | LP | 1984 |
| MM023 | DYS | DYS | LP | 1984 |
| MM024 | various artists | Mr. Beautiful Presents: All Hard | LP | 1985 |
| MM025 | Band 19 | Dictate | 12" | 1985 |
| MM026 | — | | | |
| MM027 | The Freeze | Rabid Reaction | LP | 1985 |
