= Jerry's Kids (band) =

American hardcore punk band

- Origin: Braintree, Massachusetts, U.S.
- Genres: Hardcore punk
- Years active: 1981–1990; 1994; 2004–2018
- Labels: Modern Method, X-Claim, Taang! Records, Reflex/Wolfpack
- Past members: Bob Cenci; Karl Jacobson –; Eric Saganov; Rick Jones; Bryan Jones; Dave Aronson; Brian Betzger; Chris Doherty; Joseph Orangio; Mike Dean; Jack Clark; Ross Luongo

Jerry's Kids is a Boston, Massachusetts, hardcore punk band, formed in 1981, from Braintree, Massachusetts, United States.

The band was named for "the beneficiaries of the Jerry Lewis telethon". Their first recorded output was on the Modern Method This Is Boston, Not L.A. compilation LP in 1982. They contributed six tracks along with other early Boston hardcore band Gang Green.

Frontman Bryan Jones and rhythm guitar player Dave Aronson left the band early on. Bryan Jones had broken his leg at one of their gigs and his parents denied him permission to play in the band any further. Bassist Rick Jones (Bryan's brother) switched to vocals and Chris Doherty of Gang Green took over on rhythm guitar. It was this line-up that recorded the classic 12 song LP Is This My World? on X-Claim in 1983, featuring songs such as "Cracks In The Wall", "Build Me A Bomb" and "Vietnam Syndrome".

Is This My World? was reviewed by Pushead in Maximumrocknroll: "An adventure into hyperactive, full-tilt, bulldozing quickness and thundering power. This overwhelming supply of burning rapid-fire speed destroys the mold, exploding into maniac doses of invincible strength and energy. Bolting drums, high-velocity crooning, and hysterically blistering wild guitars (featuring ex-GANG GREEN axeman Chris Doherty). JERRY’S KIDS totally shred the eardrums to mincemeat. For the fast fanatic’s cravings; the essence of what other will try to duplicate". Trouser Press called the album "a hardcore classic". In Europe, Ox-Fanzine gave the album 8/10.

They broke up in 1985, but reformed in 1987 with a more speed metal sound and released an LP on Taang! Records entitled Kill Kill Kill. Reflex/Wolfpack Records released a limited re-issue of the Is This My World? LP in 2002. The band reunited again in 2004 and has been playing several shows per year around Boston since then.

== Lineups ==
=== Before 1981 ===
- Bob Cenci – guitar
- Karl Jacobson – guitar
- Eric Saganov – Drums
- Rick Jones – bass

=== 1981–1982 ===
- Bryan Jones – vocals
- Bob Cenci – guitar
- Dave Aronson – guitar
- Rick Jones – bass
- Brian Betzger – drums

=== 1982 ===
- Rick Jones – vocals and bass
- Bob Cenci – guitar
- Dave Aronson – guitar
- Brian Betzger – drums

=== 1982–1984 ===
- Rick Jones – vocals and bass
- Bob Cenci – guitar
- Chris Doherty – guitar
- Brian Betzger – drums
- Joseph Orangio - vocals

=== 1986 ===
- Rick Jones – vocals and bass
- Bob Cenci – guitar
- Dave Aronson – guitar
- Mike Dean – drums

=== 1986–1990 ===
- Rick Jones – vocals and bass
- Bob Cenci – guitar
- Dave Aronson – guitar
- Jack Clark – drums

=== 1994 (Reunion Show at Bill's Bar) ===
- Rick Jones – vocals and bass
- Bob Cenci – guitar
- Chris Doherty – guitar
- Brian Betzger – drums

=== 2004–present ===
- Rick Jones – vocals and bass
- Bob Cenci – guitar
- Ross Luongo – guitar
- Jack Clark – drums

== Discography ==
=== Studio albums ===
- Is This My World? (1983)
- Kill Kill Kill (1989)
