= International P.E.A.C.E. Benefit Compilation =

P.E.A.C.E.

Compilation album by various artists
- Released: 1984
- Recorded: 1982–1984
- Genre: Punk rock; hardcore punk; anarcho-punk; thrashcore
- Length: 1:50:07 (original LP), 2:03:25 (CD reissue)
- Label: R Radical Records (original LP), New Red Archives (CD reissue)

Back cover

Professional ratings
Review scores
Source	Rating
AllMusic (1984 release)	4/5 stars
AllMusic (1997 release)	3/5 stars

The International P.E.A.C.E. Benefit Compilation, (Note: This is the original title of the album, as it is printed on the spine of the 1984 LP release.) commonly referred to as the P.E.A.C.E. compilation, retitled in 1997 as P.E.A.C.E./War, by combining the legends on its front and back cover, for its reissue on CD, (Note: New Red Archives #NRA68CD) is a compilation double album first released in 1984 by R Radical Records, (Note: R Radical #R.R.R. 1984) the label run by MDC frontman Dave Dictor, in association with San Francisco Bay Area punk fanzine Maximumrocknroll. The "P.E.A.C.E." in the album title is a backronym for "Peace, Energy, Action, Cooperation, Evolution".

== Overview ==
P.E.A.C.E. features 55 hardcore punk acts from around the world, including high profile bands like Dead Kennedys, Crass, Subhumans, Butthole Surfers, and MDC .

Maximumrocknroll's main contribution to the project, other than assisting in recruiting acts to participate on the double album, was in the assemblage of a 72-page magazine-sized insert featuring several pages on the topics of nuclear disarmament, imperialism, radiation, pollution, and political demonstrations.

All of the profits from the album, according to a primitive obi strip-style insert shrinkwrapped to the original double vinyl release, were slated for various anti-nuclear groups and activities worldwide.

== The CD reissue ==
In 1997, the indie label New Red Archives re-released the album as a double CD set under the title P.E.A.C.E./War, adding five tracks from artists on their roster to the end of disc two. The reissue does not include a reproduction of the first release's booklet, and, since its early name was changed, it is not known if the benefit aspect of the original album still holds.

== Re-release ==
Dave Dictor along with Grimace Records re-released this compilation in vinyl, CD, and digital format in 2020 All online streaming revenues are being donated to Covid-19 relief, via a Mutual Aid strategy implemented by Anarchist Organization Mutual Aid Disaster Relief.

== Track listings ==
In keeping with the original album's insert, the band's country of origin is given in parentheses.

=== 1984 2-LP release ===
Side A
No.	Title	Artist/Country	Length
1.	"Up Against a Wall"	Articles of Faith (USA)	2:07
2.	"Endless Blockads for the Pussyfooter"	G.I.S.M. (Japan)	3:44
3.	"Ashes to Ashes"	Neon Christ (USA)	1:41
4.	"Schluter's Kabinet"	Kalashnikov (Denmark) (Note: The song is about the then Danish prime minister Poul Schlüter.)	1:46
5.	"Time Will Tell"	Cause for Alarm (USA)	2:08
6.	"No U.S.A."	Local Disturbance (Netherlands)	2:42
7.	"Honour's Calling"	Unwarranted Trust (Canada)	3:11
8.	"Finirà mai?" (It Will Never End?)	Wretched (Italy) (Note: On the booklet insert provided with the original release, the track is incorrectly titled as "Mai arrendersi" (Never Surrender), which is the name of another song by Wretched.)	1:10
9.	"Drop the A-Bomb on Me"	0DFx (USA)	0:21
10.	"Here Come the Cops"	The Afflicted (USA)	2:15
11.	"Inutile trionfo" (Useless Triumph)	Declino (Italy)	1:31
12.	"I Hope You Get Drafted"	Dicks (USA)	1:27
13.	"Arms Race"	BGK (Netherlands)	1:11
14.	"It's You"	Crass (UK)	2:03

Side B
No.	Title	Artist/Country	Length
1.	"Swastika Ratss"	Upright Citizens (West Germany)	1:36
2.	"Banana Split Republic"	False Prophets (USA)	4:04
3.	"Kärnvapen Attack" (Nuclear Attack)	Mob 47 (Sweden)	1:20
4.	"Face Down in the Dirt"	Offenders (USA)	1:27
5.	"Sbarre" (Bars)	Contrazione (Italy)	1:32
6.	"So Much Hate"	S.C.U.M. (Canada)	1:40
7.	"Viejos patéticos" (Pathetic Old Men)	Los Violadores (Argentina)	1:37
8.	"Sometimes"	Deadlock (Netherlands)	1:34
9.	"Will It Ever End?"	P.P.G. (USA)	0:57
10.	"Peace of What?"	Trash (USA)	1:22
11.	"Police Brutality"	Vicious Circle (Australia)	2:12
12.	"Gartlands Pit"	Condemned to Death (USA)	1:09
13.	"Non mi dire" (Don't Tell Me)	Negazione (Italy)	1:27
14.	"America the Beautiful"	D.O.A. (Canada)	2:21

Side C
No.	Title	Artist/Country	Length
1.	"Snap"	D.R.I. (USA)	1:12
2.	"Jump Back"	Porno Patrol (West Germany)	2:05
3.	"Drop Out"	Treason (USA)	2:20
4.	"Abortos" (Abortions)	Shit S.A. (Spain)	2:04
5.	"Silence"	Septic Death (USA)	1:33
6.	"Life of Punishment"	Cheetah Chrome and the Motherfuckers (Italy)	2:40
7.	"No mai" (Never)	Peggio Punx (Italy)	1:20
8.	"An Uneasy Peace" (early version)	The Proletariat (USA)	3:14
9.	"From Protest to Resistance"	Conflict (UK) (Note: On the booklet insert provided with the original release, the track is incorrectly titled as "Bomb".)	2:37
10.	"Battlefield (Nightmare)"	The Iconoclast (USA)	1:54
11.	"Pay for Shit"	Pandemonium (Netherlands)	1:03
12.	"Kinky Sex Makes the World Go 'Round"	Dead Kennedys (USA)	4:18
13.	"Skorbut" (Scurvy)	Boskops (West Germany)	2:11

Side D
No.	Title	Artist/Country	Length
1.	"Rats"	Subhumans (UK) (Note: Written about the Stop the City demonstrations being held around the world at the time.)	3:19
2.	"Peace Officer"	White Lie (USA)	1:17
3.	"R.A.T./Pentagone"	Wargasm (Netherlands)	1:58
4.	"Four More Hours"	Slaughterhouse 4 (USA)	1:09
5.	"Finale"	Execute (Japan)	1:36
6.	"Reagan Youth"	Reagan Youth (USA)	1:18
7.	"The Man Goes On"	Impact (Italy)	1:33
8.	"100 Million People Dead"	Butthole Surfers (USA)	2:41
9.	"Ataque" (Attack)	Kangrena (Spain)	1:09
10.	"Will Amerika"	Porcelain Forehead (Canada)	2:26
11.	"No Mercy, No War"	Barely Human (USA)	2:48
12.	"Contro la pace, contro la guerra" (Against the Peace, Against the War)	RAF Punk (Italy)	4:02
13.	"Moment by Moment/Exiled Shadows"	Zenzile (South Africa) (Note: These are actually two poems recited by a South African expatriate. "Moment by Moment" is about the Soweto riots, while "Exiled Shadows" is about "the struggle for the liberation of our land in chains", according to the artist.)	2:11
14.	"Missile Destroyed Civilization"	MDC (USA)	2:30

=== 1997 2-CD edition ===
Disc 1
No.	Title	Artist/Country	Length
1.	"Up Against a Wall"	Articles of Faith (USA)	2:07
2.	"Endless Blockads for the Pussyfooter"	G.I.S.M. (Japan)	3:44
3.	"Ashes to Ashes"	Neon Christ (USA)	1:41
4.	"Schluter's Kabinet"	Kalashnikov (Denmark)	1:46
5.	"Time Will Tell"	Cause for Alarm (USA)	2:08
6.	"No U.S.A."	Local Disturbance (Netherlands)	2:42
7.	"Honour's Calling"	Unwarranted Trust (Canada)	3:11
8.	"Finirà mai?" (It Will Never End?)	Wretched (Italy)	1:10
9.	"Drop the A-Bomb on Me"	0DFx (USA)	0:21
10.	"Here Come the Cops"	The Afflicted (USA)	2:15
11.	"Inutile trionfo" (Useless Triumph)	Declino (Italy)	1:31
12.	"I Hope You Get Drafted"	Dicks (USA)	1:27
13.	"Arms Race"	BGK (Netherlands)	1:11
14.	"It's You"	Crass (UK)	2:03
15.	"Swastika Ratss"	Upright Citizens (West Germany)	1:36
16.	"Banana Split Republic"	False Prophets (USA)	4:04
17.	"Kärnvapen Attack" (Nuclear Attack)	Mob 47 (Sweden)	1:20
18.	"Face Down in the Dirt"	Offenders (USA)	1:27
19.	"Sbarre" (Bars)	Contrazione (Italy)	1:32
20.	"So Much Hate"	S.C.U.M. (Canada)	1:40
21.	"Viejos patéticos" (Pathetic Old Men)	Los Violadores (Argentina)	1:37
22.	"Sometimes"	Deadlock (Netherlands)	1:34
23.	"Will It Ever End?"	P.P.G. (USA)	0:57
24.	"Peace of What?"	Trash (USA)	1:22
25.	"Police Brutality"	Vicious Circle (Australia)	2:12
26.	"Gartlands Pit"	Condemned to Death (USA)	1:09
27.	"Non mi dire" (Don't Tell Me)	Negazione (Italy)	1:27
28.	"America the Beautiful"	D.O.A. (Canada)	2:21
29.	"Snap"	D.R.I. (USA)	1:12
30.	"Jump Back"	Porno Patrol (West Germany)	2:05
31.	"Drop Out"	Treason (USA)	2:20
32.	"Abortos" (Abortions)	Shit S.A. (Spain)	2:04
33.	"Silence"	Septic Death (USA)	1:33

Disc 2
No.	Title	Artist/Country	Length
1.	"Life of Punishment"	Cheetah Chrome and the Motherfuckers (Italy)	2:40
2.	"No mai" (Never)	Peggio Punx (Italy)	1:20
3.	"An Uneasy Peace" (early version)	The Proletariat (USA)	3:14
4.	"From Protest to Resistance"	Conflict (UK)	2:37
5.	"Battlefield (Nightmare)"	The Iconoclast (USA)	1:54
6.	"Pay for Shit"	Pandemonium (Netherlands)	1:03
7.	"Kinky Sex Makes the World Go 'Round"	Dead Kennedys (USA)	4:18
8.	"Skorbut" (Scurvy)	Boskops (West Germany)	2:11
9.	"Rats"	Subhumans (UK)	3:19
10.	"Peace Officer"	White Lie (USA)	1:17
11.	"R.A.T./Pentagone"	Wargasm (Netherlands)	1:58
12.	"Four More Hours"	Slaughterhouse 4 (USA)	1:09
13.	"Finale"	Execute (Japan)	1:36
14.	"Reagan Youth"	Reagan Youth (USA)	1:18
15.	"The Man Goes On"	Impact (Italy)	1:33
16.	"100 Million People Dead"	Butthole Surfers (USA)	2:41
17.	"Ataque" (Attack)	Kangrena (Spain)	1:09
18.	"Will Amerika"	Porcelain Forehead (Canada)	2:26
19.	"No Mercy, No War"	Barely Human (USA)	2:48
20.	"Contro la pace, contro la guerra" (Against the Peace, Against the War)	RAF Punk (Italy)	4:02
21.	"Moment by Moment/Exiled Shadows"	Zenzile (South Africa)	2:11
22.	"Missile Destroyed Civilization"	MDC (USA)	2:30

Bonus tracks
No.	Title	Artist/Country	Length
23.	"Walked in Line"	Jack Killed Jill (USA)	2:14
24.	"Feeble Attempt"	Corrupted Ideals (USA)	1:33
25.	"Paranoid World Vision"	Christ on a Crutch (USA)	1:36
26.	"Postcard from LA"	U.K. Subs (UK)	4:20
27.	"Die for the Government"	Anti-Flag (USA)	3:39

== Production personnel ==
- Jon Smith – engineering (track A1)
- Dan Levitin – production (A10, D14)
- Neon Christ – co-production (A3)
- Nick Jameson – co-production (A3), engineering (A3)
- Dana F. Smith – artwork (front and back cover paintings)
