= I81B4U =

EP by Gang Green
- Released: 1988
- Recorded: Newbury Sound, Boston, Massachusetts
- Genre: Crossover thrash, hardcore punk, speed metal
- Length: 15:05
- Label: Roadrunner
- Producer: Daniel Rey, Ross Humphrey

Gang Green chronology
| You Got It (1987) | I81B4U (1988) | Older... Budweiser (1989) |

I81B4U is an EP by American hardcore punk band Gang Green. It was released in 1988, after the previous year's debut for Roadrunner Records, You Got It, and before 1989's release Older... Budweiser.

The title is a reference to Van Halen's album OU812, released in the same year. I81B4U translates phonetically to "I Ate One Before You".

== Overview ==
The EP shows the band's musical style as an intermediate point between hardcore punk and speed metal. Sing-along choruses and distinguished riffs combined with proficient guitar solos are trademarks of both of the subgenres.

A few songs featured the band's trademark melodic mutant rock and roll style, "Bartender" and "Lost Chapter", have frequently been played during live shows.

Tracks 3 and 5 detail the love of loose women; the lyrics, including titles, contain noticeable sexual innuendo.

== Track listing ==
All songs written by Chris Doherty, unless stated

1. "Bartender" – 3:16
2. "Lost Chapter" (Joe Gittleman, Doherty) – 2:59
3. "Rent" – 2:07
4. "Put Her on Top" – 3:42
5. "Cum in U" – 3:02

== Credits ==
- Chris Doherty – vocals, guitar
- Fritz Ericson – guitar
- Joe Gittleman – bass
- Brian Betzger – drums
- Recorded and mixed in 1988 at Newbury Sound, Boston, Massachusetts
- Tracks 1, 2, and 4 produced by Daniel Rey
- Tracks 3 and 5 produced by Ross Humphrey
- Engineered by Drew Townson
- Mastered by Tom Coyne at Frankford/Wayne, New York City
- Illustrations by Joel Adams
