= Older... Budweiser =

Studio album by Gang Green
- Released: 1989
- Recorded: Normandy Sound, Warren, Rhode Island
- Genre: Punk rock, heavy metal, hard rock
- Length: 31:05
- Label: Emergo/Roadrunner
- Producer: Tom Soares

Gang Green chronology
I81B4U EP (1988)	Older... Budweiser (1989)	Can't LIVE Without It (1990)

Older... Budweiser is the third album by the American hardcore punk band Gang Green, released in 1989.

It was the last album of new material to emerge from the band until 1997's EP, Back & Gacked, but was followed by a live album, Can't LIVE Without It, in 1990. After the album was released, bass player Joe Gittleman left the band and replaced for the tour by D.R.I.'s Josh Pappe.

It was the first time the band had recorded outside of their Boston, Massachusetts, hometown. Rhode Island was the new setting, with Tom Soares replacing Daniel Rey at the mixing and production table.

== Overview ==
Older... Budweiser marked a change in sound for the band.

Songwriting was no longer mostly a solo effort on the part of Doherty. Nearly every track was written in partnership with another member. Gittleman was the sole writer of two tracks.

The lyrics changed from fun, beer-drinking, womanizing anthems to more socio-political themes—except "Bedroom of Doom", which reverted to form. "We Can Go" was an acknowledgement that they knew they had disappointed some fans by "selling out" or "going metal", but it contained the message that no matter what the genre, they could still enjoy a punk or metal show.

"Church of Fun" was a stab at the widespread prominence of evangelism.

The up-beat catchy melodies had dissipated somewhat, making way for a darker mood, which returns on "Bedroom of Doom" and gives way to full on thrash metal on "Casio Jungle", an attack on electronica music.

"Ballad" features an orchestra, which was used in an ironic fashion.

The band kept its "local" Boston Hardcore-style sound. The album contained some metallic attributes and also proved the band had more than one dimension lyrically.

== Reception ==
Professional ratings
Review scores
Source	Rating
AllMusic	3/5 stars

The Washington Post determined that "the Greens are funnier when the gag is musical, as in 'Ballad', a convincing attempt at a pop-metal ballad complete with acoustic guitar, whistling and strings."

AllMusic noted that, "while the theme remains the same, Gang Green takes a musical leap into the great punk rock musical unknown by incorporating violins and other string instruments on the aptly titled cut." Trouser Press stated: "Driven by the rhythm section's charging gallop, Doherty's frantic shouts and Erickson’s full-throttle arena-scale guitar lift the quartet out of small-scale adolescent punk to embrace metal, speed-rock and regular ol' hard rock."

== Track listing ==
1. "Church of Fun" (Chris Doherty, Brian Betzger) – 3:10
2. "Just One Bullet" (Doherty, Betzger) – 3:00
3. "We Can Go" (Joe Gittleman, Doherty) – 2:19
4. "Tear Down the Walls" (Fritz Erickson, Doherty) – 3:11
5. "Flight 911" (Doherty) – 3:57
6. "Bedroom of Doom" (Doherty, Erickson) – 4:16
7. "Casio Jungle" (Doherty, Betzger) – 2:22
8. "Why Should You" (Gittleman) – 3:44
9. "I'm Still Young" (Gang Green) – 2:37
10. "Ballad" (Erickson, Doherty) – 2:29

== Credits ==
- Chris Doherty – vocals, guitar
- Fritz Erickson – guitar
- Joe Gittleman – bass
- Brian Betzger – drums
- Rich Spillberg of Wargasm – additional musician
- Ralph Petrarcha – additional musician
- Orchestra on "Ballad":
  - Guido Antipastianio – cello
  - Carmine Pelegrino – piano
  - Stephanie Liebowitz – harp
  - Antony Rizelli – violin 1
  - Herbert Boletti – violin 2
  - Vinny Scalisi – trumpet
  - Tommy Stromboli – trombone
  - Louie Bianelli – tuba
- Recorded and mixed in 1989 at Normandy Sound, Warren, Rhode Island
- Produced and engineered by Tom Soares
- Assistant engineered by Jamie Locke
