= SSD (band) =

American hardcore band

Background information
- Also known as: SS Decontrol
- Origin: Boston, Massachusetts, U.S.
- Genres: Hardcore punk; heavy metal
- Years active: 1981–1985
- Labels: Taang!, X-Claim, Modern Method, Homestead
- Members: Springa; Al Barile; Jaime Sciarappa; Chris Foley; Francois Levesque

SSD (Society System Decontrol) was an American straight edge hardcore band from Boston. They released two records as SS Decontrol in the early 1980s and then formally changed their name to SSD. As SSD, they released two more records with a heavy metal influenced sound. However, the group is often simply referred to, including all its periods, as SSD.

== History ==
The band's early logo

Formed by songwriter/guitarist Al Barile (then a machinist at the General Electric plant in Lynn, Massachusetts and a student at Northeastern University), SSD started performing at smaller venues throughout the Greater Boston metropolitan area, like Gallery East, in the summer of 1981. The band quickly gained notoriety within the local music scene for intense, charged performances and the provocative antics of their core group of followers, the Boston Crew.

The original lineup was Al Barile on guitar, Springa (David Spring) on vocals, Jaime Sciarappa on bass and Chris Foley on drums. They released their debut LP The Kids Will Have Their Say on their own X-Claim label in 1982. Ian MacKaye of Minor Threat was a friend and supporter and his Dischord label's logo appeared on the back cover.

In 1983 they added second guitarist Francois Levesque and released the EP Get It Away, widely regarded as their best record, and one that helped define Boston's straight-edge scene. The X-Claim pressings of it and The Kids Will Have Their Say are both highly collectable.

Like many hardcore bands in the mid-1980s, particularly in the Boston area, SSD began heading in a heavy metal direction. In 1984 they signed to the Boston label Modern Method and released the How We Rock EP, which was rooted in the hardcore sound but exhibited overt heavy metal characteristics, such as a relatively high number of lengthy guitar solos. After signing to Homestead they released the Break It Up LP in 1985 which saw the band expand further into the metal genre, leaving behind all trappings of punk and hardcore. SSD broke up in November that year.

Barile went on to form Gage, Sciarappa joined Slapshot, and Springa went on to join Razorcaine and Die Blitzkinder. On February 5, 2025, SSD were inducted into the New England Music Hall of Fame. Barile died of rectal cancer on April 6, 2025, at the age of 63.

Scott Schinder, in his book Alt-Rock-a-Rama, described SSD as "The most important hardcore band to emerge from New England."

== Discography ==
- The Kids Will Have Their Say (LP, X-Claim, 1982)
- Get It Away (EP, X-Claim, 1983)
- Jolly Old Saint Nicholas (7", Taang Records)
- A Boston Rock Christmas (various artists compilation, Boston Rock, 1983) – "Jolly Old St. Nick"
- How We Rock (LP, Modern Method, 1984)
- Break It Up (LP, Homestead, 1985)
- Power (compilation, Taang!, 1993)

== See also ==
- Boston hardcore
- Music of Massachusetts
