= You Got It (album) =

Studio album by Gang Green
- Released: 1987
- Studio: Blue Jay Recording Studio, Boston
- Genre: Hardcore punk, speed metal, skate punk, thrash metal
- Length: 40:43
- Label: Roadrunner
- Producer: Thom Moore

Gang Green chronology
Another Wasted Night (1986)	You Got It (1987)	I81B4U EP (1988)

Professional ratings
Review scores
Source	Rating
AllMusic	3/5 stars

You Got It is the second full-length album from Boston hardcore punk band Gang Green. It was released in 1987, a year after their previous release, Another Wasted Night, in 1986. It was their first for a major record label – Roadrunner Records – after leaving independent punk label, Taang.

Chris Doherty and Brian Betzger were the only surviving members from the previous album. Joe Gittleman replaced Glen Stilphen on bass, and Fritz Ericson replaced Chuck Stilphen on lead guitar after "a major dispute". The brothers had since formed a band of their own called Mallethead.

== Overview ==
Earlier versions of "Let's Drink Some Beer" and "Another Bomb" can be found on the German version of the band's debut LP "Another Wasted Night" on Funhouse Records. A live version of "Haunted House" had previously appeared on the U.S. cassette version of "Another Wasted Night" on Taang! Records.

The Re-Release came as double-CD version featuring the tracks from the follow-up album "Older...Budweiser".

== Track listing ==
- All songs written by Chris Doherty, unless stated

First Keg

1. "Haunted House" – 1:39
2. "We'll Give It To You" – 3:12
3. "Sheet Rock" – 3:53
4. "Ballerina Massacre" (Brian Betzger) – 3:59
5. "Born to Rock" (Doherty, Betzger, Joe Gittleman) – 4:36
6. "Another Bomb" – 2:46
7. "L.D.S.B." (Doherty, D Barret) – 1:11

Second Keg

1. "Whoever Said" – 3:36
2. "Party With the Devil" – 3:56
3. "Somethings" – 2:32
4. "The Climb" (Doherty, Betzger) – 4:09
5. "Sick, Sex, Six" (Betzger) – 6:11

== Credits ==
- Chris Doherty – vocals, guitar
- Fritz Erickson – guitar
- Joe Gittleman – bass
- Brian Betzger – drums
- Thom Moore and Rob Peters – background vocals
- Tony Nichols – additional guitar tracks – was in the band from November, 1986 but left to form Meliah Rage before its release
- Recorded in 1987 at Blue Jay Recording Studio, Boston, Massachusetts
- Produced and engineered by Thom Moore
- Assistant engineered by Mark Wessels
- Mastered at Masterdisk, New York
- Logo artwork by Mark Falls
