= Illusory Walls =

2021 studio album by the World Is a Beautiful Place & I Am No Longer Afraid to Die

Studio album by the World Is a Beautiful Place & I Am No Longer Afraid to Die
- Released: October 8, 2021
- Studios: Silver Bullet, Burlington, Connecticut; David Bello's and Katie Dvorak's home studios, Philadelphia
- Genres: Post-rock; emo; progressive rock
- Length: 70:25
- Label: Epitaph
- Producers: Chris Teti; Greg Thomas

The World Is a Beautiful Place & I Am No Longer Afraid to Die chronology
Always Foreign (2017)	Illusory Walls (2021)	Thank You for Being Here (2022)

Singles from Illusory Walls
- 1. "Invading the World of the Guilty as a Spirit of Vengeance" Released: August 3, 2021; 2. "Queen Sophie for President" Released: September 1, 2021; 3. "Trouble" Released: October 5, 2021

Illusory Walls is the fourth studio album by American emo band the World Is a Beautiful Place & I Am No Longer Afraid to Die, released October 8, 2021, by Epitaph Records. The name of the album, as well as the lead single "Invading the World of the Guilty as a Spirit of Vengeance", is inspired by the video game series Dark Souls. It is the band's first album since the departure of guitarist-vocalists Tyler Bussey and Dylan Balliett and the death of founding member Tom Diaz. The album was followed by a tour through the fall, including a concert at Brooklyn's Elsewhere Hall which was recorded for their live album Thank You for Being Here.

== Writing and recording ==
Recording was split between Chris Teti's home studio, Silver Bullet Studios, in Burlington, Connecticut; and David Bello's and Katie Dvorak's homes both in Philadelphia, where they recorded their respective vocal parts and Dvorak recorded her synthesizer. This, as well as the year-long timeframe the album was made in, enabled the band to experiment a lot more with their writing, as opposed to past releases which were usually fully turned around in the span of a couple months with ideas needing to be immediate in order to meet strict deadlines. In an interview with BrooklynVegan's Andrew Sacher, Chris Teti described this using the example of his process of coming up with his lead guitar part for the middle and three-quarters sections of "Queen Sophie for President", saying that he was "pretty stumped on that song in general for like months" but "sat on it for a couple months and played around with some ideas in my free time", even declaring he would avoid listening to the song for a week before returning to it. One day, while watching a band documentary on either Blur or Bloc Party, Teti was inspired to buy a guitar pedal which led him to the song's dual lead guitar part for that section and even inspired him to rewrite the rest of the song's guitars.

Teti also explained how the length of the two last songs on the album was partly inspired by a conversation with Fiddlehead's Patrick Flynn during the recording of their album Between the Richness; how recording had to be delayed because of Dvorak injuring her vocal chords and being unable to sing for multiple months; and how that injury was one of numerous lyrical themes she and Bello explored on the album along with Bello discussing "dietal issues" and "fucked up stuff" from his childhood growing up in West Virginia, which Teti described as making him "nostalgic for [Bello's] childhood" despite having no nostalgia for his own.

== Release ==
The album was preceded by three singles: "Invading the World of the Guilty as a Spirit of Vengeance" was released on August 3, 2021, "Queen Sophie for President" was released on September 1, and "Trouble" was released on October 5. The first two came with music videos directed by Adam Peditto, with the former starring Wataru Nishida, and the third had an animated video directed by Callum Scott-Dyson.

== Live ==
Thank You for Being Here

Live album by the World Is a Beautiful Place & I Am No Longer Afraid to Die
- Released: October 7, 2022
- Recorded: November 13, 2021
- Venues: Elsewhere Hall, Brooklyn, New York
- Length: 41:22
- Label: Epitaph

The World Is a Beautiful Place & I Am No Longer Afraid to Die chronology
Illusory Walls (2021)	Thank You for Being Here (2022)	Dreams of Being Dust (2025)

Prior to announcing the album, the band announced US headlining tour dates in June 2021, supported by Bent Knee, Greet Death, State Faults, and Gates. The last of those dates was a November 13 performance at Elsewhere Hall in Brooklyn, featuring the band's core lineup playing alongside Bent Knee's Chris Baum on violin and the band's manager Anthony Gesa on guitar, a show which BrooklynVegan's Andrew Sacher reviewed positively. On August 30, 2022, the band announced a live album and tour documentary which had been recorded during the Elsewhere Hall show, both titled Thank You for Being Here. A trailer and a single release of their live performance of "January 10, 2014" from their previous album Harmlessness were both released the same day. The second single, their recording of Illusory Walls's "Afraid to Die", was released September 27, and the album and tour doc were both released October 7 by Epitaph Records.

== Style ==
The album is a mix of emo, post-rock, and progressive rock, with the prog rock newly emphasized compared to their previous releases. The album has been called the band's most adventurous release to date despite the band's pared down lineup, even incorporating elements of metal music. That changed lineup includes the reduction of the band from three guitarists to just one, though the mix is regarded as no less full or intricate, with Beats Per Minute's Rob Hakimian even saying the album adds "a lot more guitars ... to their already-dense sound." Steven Buttery's drums are called "punchy", "thunderous", and "relentless". The album also sees the addition of string and horn sections from guest musicians, with the strings described in terms such as "cinematic", "elegiac", "anthemic", and "dramatic". Overall though, the band's core sound remains the same: "[David] Bello and Katie Dvorak still trade vocal duties, guitars still loop, and sudden climaxes are still the backbone". The album even incorporates elements which can be drawn back to the band's previous work: the "spacious post-rock" of Whenever, If Ever; "gleaming theatrics" and "unabashed grandeur" of Harmlessness; and "lyrical clarity" and "melancholy" of Always Foreign; and contains multiple callbacks to past the World Is music, such as the inclusion of a guitar from the band's split album with Deer Leap, Are Here to Help You, at the end of "Fewer Afraid"; a small clip of music originally from between the last two songs on Harmlessness appearing at the end of the music video for "Invading the World of the Guilty as a Spirit of Vengeance"; and a reference to the vocals of the Long Live Happy Birthday EP track "Katamari Duquette" on "Died in the Prison of the Holy Office". 35 of the album's 70 minute runtime is dedicated to its last two songs, "Infinite Josh" and "Fewer Afraid", both of which No Ripcord's Juan Edgardo Rodriguez calls "post-rock epics that split the difference between Yo La Tengo and Explosions in the Sky" and compares them to expanded versions of longer songs from the band's previous albums.

Lyrically, the album opens in a less optimistic position. Opening track "Afraid to Die" subverts the band's name to depict a story of people struggling under capitalism, though with a note of hopefulness suggested by the song's string-filled finish. The whole album takes the same anti-capitalistic stance, with depictions of protagonists who struggle with low incomes, medication costs, homelessness, consumerism, and various failed attempts to cope with these things such as drugs, religion, and self-help. Exclaim!'s Adam Feibel calls the album the band's "most angry, cynical and hopeless record" but "also their most joyous, ambitious and hopeful record", The hopefulness opens up on the last two tracks, with lines such as "The objects we're locked in, immobile and violent / Just fewer like that, fewer afraid" feeling like an awakening,slant and "Fewer Afraid"'s reuse of the coda from Whenever, If Ever's "Getting Sodas" – "The world is a beautiful place, but we have to make it that way / Whenever you find home, we'll make it more than just a shelter / If everyone belongs there, it will hold us all together / If you're afraid to die, then so am I." – showing the band display how they hold themselves together through shared understanding and trust.

== Reception ==
Illusory Walls ratings
Aggregate scores
Source	Rating
AnyDecentMusic?	8/10
Metacritic	82/100
Review scores
Source	Rating
Beats Per Minute	83/100
Exclaim!	9/10
No Ripcord	7/10
Pitchfork	6.8/10
Slant Magazine	4.5/5 stars
Sputnikmusic	4.7/5

According to the review aggregator Metacritic, Illusory Walls received "universal acclaim" based on a weighted average score of 82 out of 100 from 6 critic scores. Beats Per Minute's Rob Hakimian said that 20-minute closing track "Fewer Afraid" is "a perfect way to underline an album so overloaded with emotion and sheer sonic weight that you sometimes wonder how they manage to keep it chugging so frictionlessly", and "Illusory Walls is a definitive document of the power of their combined ability and belief." In Exclaim!, Adam Feibel called Illusory Walls "a going-for-it album from a band that has never been known to hold back anyway" on which the band "give a lot and only ask for some of your time, patience and attention in return", and that "at every interval, [the band] make it worth your while."

Pitchfork's Patric Fallon said the album "sacrifices intimacy and warmth in favor of the most technically proficient and hard-hitting music of their career." Jordan Walsh wrote in Slant that the album "feels like the awakening that the band has been building toward all along", the band "bring[s] their emo-inflected brand of post-rock to bigger, darker, and more life-affirming places than ever before", and that they "[incorporate] a prog-rock bombast and studio slickness that serve to revitalize the band's signature sound." Stereogum's Chris DeVille called the album's lyrics "consistently remarkable" and "as immersive and stirring as the music", and the album the band's "heaviest, proggiest, most audacious release to date", "scaling up the old bombast in every conceivable way."

=== Year-end lists ===
Illusory Walls year-end lists
Publication	#	Ref.
The Alternative	18	
BrooklynVegan	16	
Chorus.fm	21	
Flood Magazine	24	
Sputnikmusic	2	
Treble	50	

== Track listing ==
All tracks are written by the World Is a Beautiful Place & I Am No Longer Afraid to Die. Additional lyrics on "Fewer Afraid" by Sarah Cowell and Christopher June Zizzamia.

Illusory Walls tracks
No.	Title	Length
1.	"Afraid to Die"	3:09
2.	"Queen Sophie for President"	3:29
3.	"Invading the World of the Guilty as a Spirit of Vengeance"	5:50
4.	"Blank//Drone"	1:40
5.	"We Saw Birds Through the Hole in the Ceiling"	3:35
6.	"Died in the Prison of the Holy Office"	6:48
7.	"Your Brain Is a Rubbermaid"	3:03
8.	"Blank//Worker"	2:46
9.	"Trouble"	4:42
10.	"Infinite Josh"	15:39
11.	"Fewer Afraid"	19:44
Total length:		70:25

== Personnel ==
=== Band ===
- David F. Bello – vocals, guitar
- Steven K. Buttery – drums, mallets, auxiliary percussion
- Joshua K. Cyr – bass, vocals
- Katie Dvorak – vocals, synthesizer
- Chris Teti – guitar, vocals, bass

=== Additional musicians ===
- Chris Baum, Michael Hustedde, Cymrie Hukill, and Julie Beistline – violin
- Roselie Samte and Caryn Bradley – viola
- Ben Swartz and Lisa Williams – cello
- Matt Hull – trumpet
- Eric Stilwell – trombone
- Travis Bliss – saxophone
- Sarah Cowell, Adam Peditto, Connor Feimster, Christopher June Zizzamia, and Caroline Mills – additional vocals

=== Technical ===
- Chris Teti – producer, mixing engineer, programming, recording engineer
- Greg Thomas – producer, mixing engineer, recording engineer, string composition, string arrangement, additional programming
- Kris Crummett – mastering engineer
- Randy Slaugh – string arrangement, additional programming, additional orchestra production and engineering
- Jamie Van Dyck – string arrangement, additional programming
- Chris Baum – additional string composition (4), string arrangement
- David F. Bello and Katie Dvorak – additional engineering
- Justin Khan and Dennis Tuohey – additional editing
- Brookesia Studio – artwork
- Finnbogi Örn – album layout design
