= Between the Richness =

Studio album by Fiddlehead
- Released: May 21, 2021
- Recorded: February 2020
- Studios: Q Division Studios, Somerville, Massachusetts
- Genres: Post-hardcore · melodic hardcore; emo
- Length: 25:11
- Label: Run for Cover

Fiddlehead chronology
Springtime and Blind (2018)	Between the Richness (2021)	Death Is Nothing to Us (2023)

Singles from Between the Richness
- 1. "Million Times" Released: March 16, 2021; 2. "Heart to Heart" Released: April 14, 2021

Between the Richness is the second studio album by the American post‑hardcore band Fiddlehead, released on May 21, 2021, through Run for Cover Records. It follows the group's 2018 debut, Springtime and Blind.

Work on the record began in 2019 after the unexpected success of the debut and a period of personal change for the band's lead vocalist Pat Flynn, who became married and a father while the album was recording. The band recorded the ten tracks in February 2020 at Q Division Studios in Somerville, Massachusetts, with engineering and mixing by Chris Teti and mastering by Dan Coutant.

Musically, the album preserves Fiddlehead's fast‑paced songwriting while adding spoken‑word passages and poetry samples. Announced on March 16, 2021, The digital and physical release of Between the Richness was preceded by the singles "Million Times" and "Heart to Heart." The album received positive reviews from critics, who praised its emotional directness and its energetic hardcore sound. The album also reached number nine on the UK Rock & Metal Albums Chart.

== Background and recording ==
Fiddlehead, featuring members of the hardcore band Have Heart (singer Pat Flynn, drummer Shawn Costa) and Basement (guitarist Alex Henery), had initially not expected to make a second record. However, the strong reception of their debut Springtime and Blind (2018), as well as Flynn's life between the first and second album going through "massive" changes: he got married and had his first child, coinciding with the ten-year anniversary of his father's death, motivated him to continue writing and turn what was once meant as a one-off project into another album. The band began recording new songs in 2019.

Between the Richness was recorded in February 2020 at Q Division Studios in Somerville, Massachusetts. According to Flynn, sessions were produced in a relaxed, "no expectations" manner, as the band still treated Fiddlehead as a passion project rather than a full-time career. The recording was engineered and mixed by Chris Teti and mastered by Dan Coutant. These sessions took place shortly before the COVID-19 pandemic shutdown; the band, uncertain when they could perform again, still attempted to complete the album.

== Composition and lyrics ==
Musically, Between the Richness continues Fiddlehead's blend of post-hardcore aggression with melodic emo and punk sensibilities. Writing for Pitchfork, Ian Cohen noted that the album doesn't stray far from the band's foundational sound, describing it as "gruff but approachable, intense without being aggro, emo but not emo." The album frequently uses spoken-word and poetry to bookend songs. The opening track "Grief Motif" begins with a recording of poet E. E. Cummings reciting lines from his poem "I carry your heart with me." The same poem reappears at the album's conclusion: in the final moments of "Heart to Heart," Cummings' voice returns to finish the poem's closing lines ("I carry your heart (I carry it in my heart)") as the music fades.

Lyrically, Between the Richness addresses personal issues for Flynn. Whereas Fiddlehead's first album saw Flynn processing his father's death largely through his mother's perspective, on this record he writes from his own perspective in the present. "The Years" addresses the passage of time since his father's passing ("All the years have changed / ten folded like a day… Old Death's dulling sting to new life blooming") alongside the joy of new life. "Down University" and "Get My Mind Right" confront feelings of inadequacy, depression and the pressure to meet expectations. The album's closing track "Heart to Heart" is written as a letter to Flynn's infant son, while also doubling as an imagined dialogue with his late father across the divide of life and death. "Essentially, it's a song about finding ways to reconnect with those we love, despite the hard barriers between life and death," Flynn explained of its message. According to Flynn, the title refers to "the richness of life and the richness of death," symbolized by Flynn's infant son and late father (both named Richard).

== Release and promotion ==
On March 16, 2021, Fiddlehead officially announced Between the Richness alongside the release of its lead single "Million Times." The track was made available on streaming platforms and accompanied by a music video directed by guitarist Alex Henery. A second song, "Heart to Heart," was released on April 14, 2021 as the album's second single. Kerrang! premiered "Heart to Heart", with Flynn discussing the song's meaning in an interview.

Between the Richness was released on May 21, 2021 through Run for Cover Records, in digital and physical formats. To celebrate the album, the band performed a handful of regional shows when pandemic restrictions allowed.

== Critical reception ==
Professional ratings
Review scores
Source	Rating
Kerrang!	4/5 stars
Pitchfork	7.6/10
PopMatters	8/10

Between the Richness received positive reviews from critics, who praised its intensity and sincerity.

Mischa Pearlman of Kerrang! gave the album a 4 out of 5 rating, describing it as "glorious" and "one of those rare records that not only helps you understand life more... but also makes it better". He complimented Fiddlehead's ability to condense "all of life's highs and lows" into a short runtime, noting the record's balance of catharsis and hope. Writing for Pitchfork, Ian Cohen also praised the album, scoring it 7.6/10. He wrote that Between the Richness "doesn't stray far from [the band's] foundational qualities: gruff but approachable, intense without being aggro, emo but not emo".

PopMatters critic Andrew Spiess praised the record's "precise and vigorous" songwriting, giving it a score of 8/10. In his review, he commended the band for trimming any fat and delivering a potent 25-minute experience that "rocks, but isn't overwhelming" despite the members' backgrounds in heavier bands. He also noted the emotional clarity of Flynn's lyrics, saying the vocalist "isn't afraid to express deep-cutting sincerity" in confronting topics of love and loss.

== Track listing ==
All tracks are written by Patrick Flynn.

No.	Title	Length
1.	"Grief Motif"	1:12
2.	"The Years"	2:05
3.	"Million Times"	2:45
4.	"Eternal You"	2:28
5.	"Loverman"	2:13
6.	"Down University"	2:35
7.	"Get My Mind Right"	2:56
8.	"Life Notice"	2:27
9.	"Joyboy"	2:13
10.	"Heart to Heart"	4:17
Total length:		25:11

=== Notes ===
- E.E. Cummings' 1950 recording of "I Carry Your Heart with Me" is sampled on tracks 1 and 10.

== Personnel ==
=== Fiddlehead ===
- Patrick "Pat" Flynn – vocals, lyrics
- Alex Henery – guitar (lead)
- Alex Dow – guitar (rhythm)
- Casey Nealon – bass guitar
- Shawn Costa – drums

=== Additional personnel ===
- Chris Teti – engineering, mixing
- Matthew Alexander – assistant engineer
- Dan Coutant – mastering

== Charts ==
Weekly chart performance for Between the Richness
Chart (2021)	Peak position
UK Rock & Metal Albums (Official Charts)	9
