= Tied Down Fest =

Tied Down Fest is an American music festival focused on punk rock and hardcore punk held at the Russell Industrial Center in Detroit.

The 2022 lineup had Trash Talk, Fiddlehead and Jesus Piece. The following year featured acts such as Gorilla Biscuits and Trapped Under Ice. Acts such as Pity Sex and 100 Demons performed at the festival in 2024. Have Heart, Drain, Terror and Youth of Today also played. Additionally, bands like Ceremony, No Warning, Fury and Haywire played the festival's pre-show event. In 2025, the lineup consisted of American Nightmare, Speed and Fiddlehead.

== See also ==
- BLED Fest
- Michigan Metal Fest
- Post Fest
