= Skrappys =

Performing arts center in Tucson, Arizona, U.S.

Coordinates: 32.2212°N 110.9668°W

Skrappy's Tucson Youth Collective
- Skrappy's
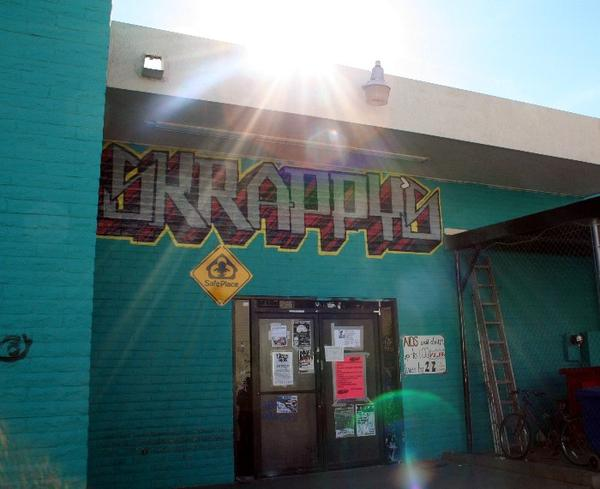
- Interactive map of Skrappy's Tucson Youth Collective
- Former names: Skrappy's Tucson Youth Center
- Location: Tucson, Arizona
- Owner: Kathy Wooldridge
- Capacity: 50 (as of January 2009)
- Type: Music venue and recreation center

Construction
- Opened: 1995
- Renovated: 2002
- Expanded: 2009
- Closed: 2013

Skrappy's was a youth-run, youth-oriented performing arts and after-school center as well as an all-ages music venue, performance space and community hub in downtown Tucson, Arizona. It was billed as a drug-free, positive environment that encouraged expression and youth culture. It offered live music, and classes in music, film and theater, break dancing, visual art, printing, karate, literacy, GPS mapping, sewing and fashion design photography, writing, publishing, activism, organizing, civic engagement and empowerment.

== History ==
The center was founded in 1995 Kathy Wooldridge. As an alcohol-free haven, Skrappy's hosted national bands, such as Botch, Fall Out Boy, Give Up the Ghost, and a wide variety of Tucson native bands like The Bled, Versus the Mirror, Blues, The American Black Lung, Line of Fire, The Mean Reds, and Beyond the Citadel of Coup de Grace. Skrappy's also offered job opportunities, drug counseling, classes and emergency clothing, blankets and shelter.

In December 2005, a fight broke out in Skrappy's when adult members of a gang associated with a hard-core metal band that was playing entered the venue and began shoving people. The fight moved into the parking lot where members of the gang grabbed weapons like a hammer and machete. A man with a license to carry a concealed weapon shot and killed another man who was assaulting a third person. The shooter was not charged with a crime, but the umbrella organization under which Skrappy's ran, Our Family Services, paid an out-of-court settlement of $150,000 in the summer of 2007 and never recovered financially. IN 2013 it was taken over by a local church with a youth program and renamed.

In 2006, Skrappy's served more than 16,000 young people in the form of food, clothing or referrals to other resources in the community. More than 29,000 at-risk children, youth, families, seniors and disabled adults received counseling, education, housing, mediation and crisis help. It continued its usual shows until winter of that year when it were given a 90-day eviction notice. It continued at Broadway until the summer of 2007. In September it relocated to the basement of Big Brothers Big Sisters and continued to provide services but stopped doing shows. In 2008, it moved 91 E. Toole Avenue but the building's condition forced Skrappy's team to vacate and meet at the houses of team members, collaborating with the University of Arizona and city officials of Tucson. It moved to 191 E. Toole Avenue in downtown Tucson in 2009 but by 2013 the venue was a shambles and it Skrappy's closed.
