= Pat Flynn =

Pat Flynn may refer to:

- Pat Flynn (bluegrass musician) (born 1952), American guitarist, singer, and songwriter
- Pat Flynn (tennis) (born 1968), Australian tennis player
- Pat Flynn (punk singer) (born 1985), American hardcore musician
- Pat Flynn (footballer) (born 1985), Irish footballer

== See also ==
- Patrick Flynn (disambiguation)
