= The Things We Carry =

Studio album by Have Heart
- Released: August 8, 2006
- Recorded: March 2006
- Genres: Hardcore punk, youth crew
- Length: 25:56
- Label: Bridge 9 Records

Have Heart chronology
What Counts EP (2005)	The Things We Carry (2006)	You Can't Go Home Again (EP) (2008)

Professional ratings
Review scores
Source	Rating
Punknews.org	4.5/5 stars

The Things We Carry is the first full-length album by the straight edge hardcore punk band Have Heart. It was released in 2006, following EPs in 2003 and 2004.

== Critical reception ==
Las Vegas Weekly called the album "the defining hardcore record of the century so far." Punknews.org wrote that "with undeniably earnest lyrics and a blistering, relentless pace, The Things We Carry sets the standards high for what modern day straight-edge hardcore albums should sound like."

== Track listing ==
1. "Life Is Hard Enough" – 0:56
2. "Watch Me Sink" – 3:15
3. "Armed with a Mind" – 3:14
4. "About Face" – 2:38
5. "The Unbreakable" – 2:04
6. "Old Man II (Last Words and Lessons Learned)" – 2:56
7. "Song of Shame" – 1:24
8. "To Us Fools" – 0:23
9. "Something More Than Ink" – 2:36
10. "The Machinist" – 3:01
11. "Watch Me Rise" – 3:29

== Personnel ==
Members

- Patrick Flynn - vocals
- Ryan Hudon - guitar
- Kei Yasui - guitar
- Ryan Briggs - bass
- Shawn Costa - drums

Production

- Engineered by Jim Siegel, March 2006
- Mastered by David Locke, @ JP Masters, Boston, Massachusetts
- Guest vocals by JD, Kenny, Sean Murphy & Pete Maher
- Backing vocals by Brendan Dougherty, Eric Lepine, Kenny, Matt Dude, Nick Dub, Pauly Edge, Sean Mckendry, Sean Murphy, Pete Maher & Todd Pollock
- Artwork by Don Naylor
- Layout by Chris Wrenn & Kei Yasui
- Photo by Todd Pollock
