= Ten Yard Fight =

American hardcore punk band

- Origin: Boston, Massachusetts, U.S.
- Genres: Hardcore punk
- Years active: 1995–1999, 2018, 2025
- Label: Equal Vision Records
- Past members: Anthony "Wrench" Moreschi; John LaCroix; Jay Frechette; Anthony Pappalardo; Tim Cossar; Brian "Clevo" Ristau; Ben Chused; Aaron Dalbec; Chris Patterson

Ten Yard Fight was an American straight edge, football-themed band formed in 1995 in Boston. Along with In My Eyes and Floorpunch, they spearheaded the youth crew revival in 1997. Ten Yard Fight's "official" last show was in Boston on October 17, 1999, which would become the first National Edge Day. They would later play two additional shows with partial line-ups and a full reunion show at This Is Hardcore festival.

== Biography ==
Ten Yard Fight played their first show with Moreschi clad in a combination of football gear and punk rock clothing. After receiving positive feedback the band decided to become more serious. Ten Yard Fight began performing on the East Coast.

Having sold 1,000 copies of their demo, Ten Yard Fight teamed up with Big Wheel Recreation to release the Hardcore Pride 7-inch in 1996. The initial pressing sold out in less than a week, helping generate a buzz that resulted in the band's signing to Equal Vision. During that time they also released a split 7-inch with Fastbreak. The first result of the partnership was to compile the demo and Hardcore Pride 7-inch onto a single CD. Ten Yard Fight would next release an album entitled Back On Track. Line-up changes followed, as the group toured Europe and the United States through 1997 and 1998. In 1998, the band recorded six new songs that would later surface on their The Only Way EP.

In between these releases, Ten Yard Fight appeared on many different compilation recordings. At the end of 1999, Ten Yard Fight played their last show together with friends Bane, Reach the Sky, and In My Eyes. This show was at the Karma Club on Lansdowne Street as the New York Yankees and Boston Red Sox of Major League Baseball were playing across the street during that year's American League Championship Series at Fenway Park. The final line-up of the band included Anthony Moreschi, guitarist John LaCroix (who started out playing bass), guitarist Tim Cossar (who later formed American Nightmare), bassist Brian Ristau, and drummer Ben Chused.

The Only Way: 1995-1999, a video documentary, had its release celebrated a year later with Ten Yard Fight taking the stage unannounced at Edge Day Two, coinciding with the final performance of Boston's "In My Eyes". During the 4+ years that Ten Yard Fight was active, the band played all over the world, including several US tours, a European tour, many shows in Canada and a weekend of two shows in Puerto Rico where Steve Reddy caused permanent spinal damage to LaCroix. At some point between May 2000 and June 2005, LaCroix had penned the first "edge confession" letter when he broke edge. This was followed closely by Ray Lemoine (the band's former tour driver) penning a similar letter known to scholars as the "State of the Edge address".

== Aftermath ==
Ristau and Moreschi reunited as First and Ten at National Edge Day 2007 in Haverhill, MA. They played another show there under the same name with Slapshot on November 8, 2008.

Moreschi went on to front Stand and Fight (Bridge 9 Records), and later formed Resist, featuring members from Drug Test and Since the Flood.

John LaCroix moved to California and started the band Terror. He now plays guitar in Portland hardcore band Unrestrained.

Ten Yard Fight's original lineup reunited for one show headlining the first day at This Is Hardcore 2018 in Philadelphia, PA.

== Discography ==
- Demo '95 (1995)
- Hardcore Pride (April 15, 1995)
- Back On Track (July 17, 1997)
- The Only Way (1999)

== See also ==
- Youth Crew
- Straight Edge
- Posicore
