= Nothing to Hide (album) =

Studio album by In My Eyes
- Released: 2000
- Genre: Hardcore punk, youth crew
- Label: Revelation

In My Eyes chronology
The Difference Between (1998)	Nothing to Hide (2000)

Professional ratings
Review scores
Source	Rating
AllMusic	3.5/5 stars
Kerrang!	3/5 stars

Nothing to Hide is the second and final studio album by In My Eyes. It was released in 2000 by Revelation Records. Showing a somewhat more developed style than that on their first album (The Difference Between), this album incorporated more melodic elements, along with some experimentation (e.g. the breakdown on track 8, "On My Side"), a characteristic rare in youth crew hardcore. Track 9, "What's Wrong With Me?", is a cover of the legendary Washington DC hardcore punk band The Faith which originally appeared on the Void/Faith split 12".

== Track listing ==
1. Take the Risk 1:37
2. For the Moment 1:43
3. Nothing to Hide 0:52
4. Can't Live Through Me 2:01
5. Perspective 1:43
6. Making Sense 1:48
7. Welcome to Boston 1:15
8. On My Side 1:49
9. What's Wrong with Me? 0:36
10. The Big Dig 1:28
11. Another Way 2:24
12. The Weight of Words 2:15
