= Death Is Nothing to Us =

Studio album by Fiddlehead
- Released: August 18, 2023
- Studio: Woolly Mammoth Studios
- Genres: Post-hardcore, alternative rock, emo
- Length: 27:14
- Language: English
- Label: Run for Cover
- Producers: Fiddlehead; Chris Teti

Fiddlehead chronology
Between the Richness (2021)	Death Is Nothing to Us (2023)	Baby I'll Change (2026)

Singles from Death Is Nothing to Us
- 1. "Sullenboy" Released: June 7, 2023; 2. "Sleepyhead" Released: July 11, 2023

"I don't want people to romanticize grief and depression, myself included. But I wanted to write about the way loss can perpetuate this feeling of sadness in your life. I didn't intend to make some kind of thematic trilogy but there is this connection to the first two records, and this album sort of rounds out some of the stages of grief that weren't addressed previously–especially this feeling of stickiness that a depressive attitude can have."

— Vocalist Patrick Flynn on the lead single "Sullenboy"

Death Is Nothing to Us is the third full-length studio album by American post-hardcore band Fiddlehead, released by Run for Cover in 2023. It has received positive reviews from critics. The music explores mourning as part of a thematic trilogy with the band's previous two releases and was influenced from many different sources, including DC hardcore, James Joyce, and Kids.

== Reception ==
Professional ratings
Review scores
Source	Rating
Distorted Sound	9/10
Exclaim!	8/10
Far Out	4.5/5 stars
God Is in the TV	7/10
Kerrang!	4/5 stars
Metal Hammer	4/5 stars
Pitchfork	7.6/10

BrooklynVegan gave several positive reviews to this album: Andrew Sacher named it one of the picks of the week when it was released, for having the band's "most melodic, hook-filled songs yet, and also some of their hardest-hitting". In a mid-year wrap-up of the best emo and post-hardcore albums of the year, he included this among the top ten and also included it among the 50 best punk albums of the year. In Exclaim!, Adam Feibel rated this album an 8 out of 10 for combining melody and intensity, with music that "is just as intellectually and emotionally engaging". This was one of the picks of the week from The Fader, where critic David Renshaw called it "nuanced" for dealing with the emotional complexities of mourning that "ends with a moment of pitch-black positivity". Mischa Pearlman, writing for Kerrang! scored this album a 4 out of 5, summing up that "it turns death into both everything and nothing, by reminding us that, even when we're no longer here, we'll still exist within the minds and memories of those who love us and who – for a while, anyway – are still here".

A feature piece from Paste by Matt Mitchell characterized this work as "dense, thoughtful, and ambitious". Nina Corcoran of Pitchfork gave Death Is Nothing to Us a 7.6 out of 10, praising the band for showing restraint by "prioritizing nimble bass and guitar work". Corcoran later chose this album to spotlight how American hardcore punk music embraced experimentation and cross-genre elements in 2023. Cogwheel of PunkNews rated this album 4 out of 5 stars for showing emotional growth through grief and having "top notch" musicianship. Updates from Revolver praised "Sleepyhead" and "Sullenboy". Two critics from Uproxx voted this among the best albums of 2023. Staff from WBUR-FM chose the best local albums of the year and Karen Muller wrote that vocalist Pat Flynn's "roar embodies that pain and rallies against it, often within the same track".

== Track listing ==
All songs written by Shawn Costa, Alex Dow, Pat Flynn, Alex Henery. and Nick Hinsch. The liner notes state that lyrics include lines "respectfully borrowed" from Jim Carrol, Alex G, Infest, Sebadoh, Trapped Under Ice, W. B. Yeats, The Cranberries, Everclear, 108, and All Chrome, as well as lyrical help from Meryn Flynn and melody help from Andrew Fisher on "Fifteen to Infinity".

1. "The Deathlife" – 1:08
2. "Sleepyhead" – 2:16
3. "Loserman" – 2:19
4. "True Hardcore (II)" – 2:34
5. "Welcome to the Situation" – 1:28
6. "Sullenboy" – 3:20
7. "Give It Time (II)" – 1:21
8. "Queen of Limerick" – 2:33
9. "The Woes" – 2:43
10. "Fiddleheads" – 2:19
11. "Fifteen to Infinity" – 3:00
12. "Going to Die" – 2:17

== Personnel ==
Fiddlehead

- Shawn Costa – drums, production
- Alex Dow – guitar, production
- Pat Flynn – lead vocals, production
- Alex Henery – guitar, backing vocals, cover art, design, layout, production
- Nick Hinsch – bass guitar, production

Additional personnel

- Matthew Alexander – engineering
- Z. Belair – tambourine on "The Woes"
- Deanie Chen – photography
- Kris Crummett – mastering at Interlace Audio
- Ian Fledge – cello on "The Deathlife"
- Justin Khan – mixing assistance
- Kate "O8" Reddy – additional vocals on "The Woes"
- Chris Teti – engineering, mixing at Silver Bullet Studios, production
- Greg Thomas – mixing assistance
- Justice Tripp – additional vocals on "True Hardcore (II)"

== See also ==
- 2023 in American music
- 2023 in rock music
- List of 2023 albums
