= Patrick Flynn =

Patrick Flynn may refer to:

- Patrick Flynn (Canadian politician) (1921–1996), Canadian Liberal Party politician of Irish extraction
- Patrick Flynn (athlete) (1894–1969), American Olympic medalist
- Patrick Flynn (composer) (1936–2008), composer and conductor
- Patrick Flynn (hurler) (1867–1948), Irish hurler
- Patrick J. Flynn, race horse trainer
- Patrick Flynn, vocalist for Have Heart and Fiddlehead

== See also ==
- Pat Flynn (disambiguation)
- Patrick O'Flynn (born 1965), politician
