= We're Down Til We're Underground =

2003 studio album by American Nightmare

Studio album by American Nightmare
- Released: September 23, 2003
- Genre: Melodic hardcore
- Length: 31:15
- Label: Equal Vision (EVR083)

American Nightmare chronology
Background Music (2001)	We're Down Til We're Underground (2003)	Year One (2004)

Professional ratings
Review scores
Source	Rating
Allmusic	2.5/5 stars
Punknews.org	4/5 stars

We're Down Til We're Underground is the second studio album by the American hardcore band American Nightmare, known at that time as Give Up The Ghost. The album was originally supposed to be titled Give Up The Ghost instead of We're Down Til We're Underground. Instead American Nightmare changed their name to Give Up The Ghost due to legal issues with another band named American Nightmare. The album was released on September 23, 2003 through Equal Vision Records. The album was later reissued in 2011 through Deathwish Inc. to coincide with the band's reunion shows.

== Track listing ==
1. "(It's Sometimes Like It Never Started)" – 0:58
2. "Love American" – 2:14
3. "Young Hearts Be Free Tonight" – 1:43
4. "Since Always" – 2:23
5. "Calculation-Nation" – 0:57
6. "The Last Supper After Party" – 2:37
7. "Crime Scene" – 2:33
8. "Bluem" – 3:24
9. "AEIOU" – 2:50
10. "Crush of the Year" – 2:04
11. "No Lotion Could Ever Unclog These Pores" – 1:11
12. "We Killed It" – 3:15
13. "(And It's Sometimes Like It Will Never End)" – 5:11
