= National Edge Day =

Unofficial observance, October 17

International Edge Day
- Also called: Straight Edge Day; 10/17; Edge Day; Edge Fest (former)
- Observed by: Straight edge people
- Type: Cultural
- Observances: Hardcore dancing, hardcore music, moshing
- Date: October 17
- Frequency: Annual
- Related to: Straight edge, hardcore punk, youth movement

Edge Day is a celebration founded by people who live straight edge lifestyles. The occasion has been observed annually on October 17 since 1999. The inaugural event, originally called Edge Fest, was held in Boston, Massachusetts. It is most prominent in Boston, but annual events are now held by individuals in U.S. states such as Georgia and California, and globally in cities such as Gothenburg, São Paulo and London.

== History ==
=== Founding ===
The first annual National Edge Day was celebrated on October 17, 1999, at the final Ten Yard Fight show at the Karma nightclub in Boston, Massachusetts. The show also featured the bands Bane, In My Eyes, Reach the Sky, and Floorpunch. This show marked the end of the 1990s "youth crew" revival, but arguably started a new chapter in straight edge society by creating an observable holiday in the community.

Since the inaugural event, a local Boston show has been organized annually to celebrate Edge Day. Central to the holiday is the organization of local live shows, performed mainly by hardcore bands who also identify as straight edge. If the 17th day of October does not fall on a weekend, the Edge Day show usually falls on the Saturday before or after October 17.

=== 2009 ===
Have Heart played one final show prior to their initial disbandment in honor of National Edge Day in Revere, Massachusetts.

National Edge Day was celebrated in Gothenburg, Sweden.

=== 2011 ===
A National Edge Day celebration was held in Atlanta, Georgia. Performing bands included Mindset, Foundation, and Break Away.

The first UK Edge Day since 2004 was held in London.

=== 2012 ===
The first recognized West Coast Edge Day was held in Santa Ana, California.

The second annual UK Edge Day show was held in London at the Brixton Jamm Bar.

=== 2015 ===
London Edge Day celebrations were held in the DIY Space For London.

Edge Day is celebrated in Kuala Lampur, Malaysia in punk space called Rumah Api.

Edge-day was celebrated at THE HARDCORE STADIUM in Cambridge, MA on Oct. 16,17,18th. Bands played included Stop and Think, Invasion and Mindset.
