= Dreams of Being Dust =

2025 studio album by the World Is a Beautiful Place & I Am No Longer Afraid to Die

Studio album by the World Is a Beautiful Place & I Am No Longer Afraid to Die
- Released: August 22, 2025
- Genres: Metalcore; post-hardcore; progressive emo
- Length: 45:00
- Label: Epitaph
- Producers: Chris Teti; Gregory Thomas

The World Is a Beautiful Place & I Am No Longer Afraid to Die chronology
| Thank You for Being Here (2022) | Dreams of Being Dust (2025) |

Singles from Dreams of Being Dust
- 1. "Auguries of Guilt" Released: June 12, 2024; 2. "Beware the Centrist" Released: May 28, 2025; 3. "Se Sufre Pero Se Goza" Released: June 24, 2025

Dreams of Being Dust is the fifth studio album by American rock band The World Is a Beautiful Place & I Am No Longer Afraid to Die. The album was released on August 22, 2025, through Epitaph Records.

== Background ==
The album was co-produced by the band's guitarist Chris Teti and metalcore band End's guitarist Gregory Thomas. It centers on the theme of worldly injustices and incorporates metalcore and progressive emo.

== Reception ==
Professional ratings
Review scores
| Source | Rating |
|---|---|
| Beats Per Minute | 59% |
| Kerrang | 4/5 |
| New Noise | 5/5 stars |
| Pitchfork | 6.2/10 |
| Sputnikmusic | 4.0/5 |

Kerrang! assigned it a rating of four out of five and noted, "Fuelled by personal tragedies and savage times, this fifth album is understandably dark in tone, but never feels too austere to engage."

The album received a rating of 6.2 from Pitchfork, whose reviewer Patrick Lyons remarked, "Gnarly, compressed guitars are paired with shouted or snarled vocals; noodly harmonized riffs accompany the more skyward-reaching singing." Beats Per Minute gave it a percentage score of 59 and described it as "not a 'confused' work lacking identity, but it is dubiously effective in its overall approach," opining that it "aims to reflect the staggering, formidable nature of contemporaneity by looking to new sonic palettes for resonance, producing songs charged with veritable grief, ferocity, and passion on part of the group."

Sputnikmusic staff member Sowing observed that the album is "leaner, angrier, and four more years removed from whatever sliver of post-pandemic light once existed," commenting "It's clear the direction they think the world is heading in." New Noise's Lamar Ramos rated the album five stars and referred to it as "a violent record for violent times, but it's also a testament to endurance."

== Track listing ==
Dreams of Being Dust track listing
| No. | Title | Length |
|---|---|---|
| 1. | "Dimmed Sun" | 3:46 |
| 2. | "Se Sufre Pero Se Goza" | 2:33 |
| 3. | "No Pilgrim" | 4:04 |
| 4. | "Beware the Centrist" | 1:44 |
| 5. | "Oubliette" | 4:02 |
| 6. | "Captagon" | 4:29 |
| 7. | "Dissolving" | 3:33 |
| 8. | "Reject All and Submit" | 3:38 |
| 9. | "December 4, 2024" | 3:55 |
| 10. | "Auguries of Guilt" | 5:34 |
| 11. | "For Those Who Will Outlive Us" | 7:03 |
| Total length: | | 44:21 |

== Personnel ==
Credits adapted from Bandcamp and Tidal.

The World Is a Beautiful Place & I Am No Longer Afraid to Die

- David F. Bello – vocals
- Katie Dvorak – synthesizer, vocals
- Anthony Gesa – guitar, vocals
- Steven K. Buttery – drums, percussion
- Joshua Cyr – bass
- Chris Teti – guitar, vocals, production, engineering, mixing, creative direction

Additional musicians

- Greg Thomas – additional guitar and vocals
- Brendan Murphy – vocals on "Se Sufre Pero Se Goza"
- Mike Sugars – vocals on "Captagon"
- Dylan Walker – vocals on "Reject All and Submit"

Production

- Greg Thomas – production, engineering, mixing
- Dennis Tuohey – engineering assistance
- Tyler Ranno – engineering assistance
- Nick DeMichele – engineering assistance
- Dave Swanson – additional engineering on "Captagon"
- Brendon Padjasek – guest vocal engineering on "Se Sufre Pero Se Goza" and "Captagon"
- Dylan Walker – guest vocal engineering on "Reject All and Submit"
- Will Putney – mastering
- Triple Dog Studio – creative direction, artwork, layout
