= BLED Fest =

Music festival in Michigan, United States

- Genre: Punk rock, hardcore punk, indie rock
- Frequency: Annually
- Venue: Heartland Educational Center
- Location: Howell, Michigan
- Years active: 2008-2019
- Founder: Ben Staub
- Website: instagram

BLED Fest (an acronym for Big Love's Educational Festival) was an American annual one-day music festival held in Howell, Michigan focused on punk rock, hardcore punk, and indie rock. The festival was held annually over an eleven-year period, with its final year being in 2019. BLED Fest was held at the Heartland Educational Center. With the venue being a former educational facility, the event's stages were set up inside what were once classrooms. The festival ended after its organizers were told they would no longer be allowed to hold the event in this location.

== History ==
The festival was founded in 2008 by Ben Staub in the initial form of a pool party in his backyard, according to Alternative Press Magazine.

Real Friends, Touché Amoré, Modern Baseball and The Early November played in 2015. La Dispute played in 2017. The 2018 lineup consisted of Basement, Norma Jean, and '68. The Wonder Years and Hawthorne Heights headlined the festival's final year in 2019. Aaron West and The Roaring Twenties, Kississippi and Prince Daddy & the Hyena also performed.

== See also ==
- Post Fest
- Tied Down Fest
