= Always Foreign =

Studio album by the World Is a Beautiful Place & I Am No Longer Afraid to Die
- Released: September 29, 2017
- Studios: Silver Bullet; Burlington, Connecticut
- Genres: Emo, indie rock, post-rock, pop-punk
- Length: 42:23
- Label: Epitaph
- Producer: Chris Teti

The World Is a Beautiful Place & I Am No Longer Afraid to Die chronology
Harmlessness (2015)	Always Foreign (2017)	Illusory Walls (2021)

Singles from Always Foreign
- 1. "Dillon and Her Son" Released: August 1, 2017; 2. "Marine Tigers" Released: August 29, 2017; 3. "Gram" Released: Sep 26, 2017

Always Foreign is the third studio album by American emo band the World Is a Beautiful Place & I Am No Longer Afraid to Die. It was released on September 29, 2017, through Epitaph Records.

== Critical reception ==
Professional ratings
Aggregate scores
Source	Rating
Metacritic	80/100
Review scores
Source	Rating
The 405	9.5/10
AllMusic	3.5./5 stars
Exclaim!	8/10
The Line of Best Fit	7.5/10
No Ripcord	7/10
Pitchfork	8.0/10
Punknews.org	8/10 stars
Under the Radar	7.5/10

Always Foreign was well received by contemporary music critics. At review aggregator site Metacritic, which assigns a normalized rating out of 100 to reviews from critics, the album received a score of 80 out of 100, indicating "generally favorable reviews" based on eight music critic's reviews.

== Track listing ==
All tracks are written by Dylan Balliett, David F. Bello, Tyler Bussey, Steven K. Buttery, Joshua Cyr, Katie Dvorak and Chris Teti, except where noted

No.	Title	Writer(s)	Length
1.	"I'll Make Everything"		2:26
2.	"The Future"		2:30
3.	"Hilltopper"		3:02
4.	"Faker"		5:12
5.	"Gram"		3:50
6.	"Dillon and Her Son"		2:24
7.	"Blank #12"	Balliett, Bello, Cyr, Teti	1:16
8.	"For Robin"		4:00
9.	"Marine Tigers"		7:04
10.	"Fuzz Minor"		4:32
11.	"Infinite Steve"	Balliett, Bello, Bussey, Buttery, Cyr, Dvorak, Greg Horbal, Teti	6:12
Total length:			42:23

== Personnel ==
The following individuals were credited with the production, artwork, and composition of the album.

The World Is a Beautiful Place & I Am No Longer Afraid to Die

- David Bello – Vocals
- Joshua Cyr – Bass, Harp, Synthesizer, Vocals
- Tyler Bussey – Guitar, Banjo, Synthesizer, Vocals
- Dylan Balliett – Guitar, Vocals
- Chris Teti – Guitar, Synthesizer, Programming
- Katie Dvorak – Synthesizer, Vocals
- Steven Buttery – Percussion, Vocals

Additional musicians

- Gary Buttery – Tuba
- Eric Stilwell – Trombone
- Matthew Hull – Trumpet
- Armand Aromin – Violin
- Sarah Cowell – Vocals
- Chad Matheny – Vocals, Electronics
- Bernard Parsons – Vocals
- Aaron Weiss – Vocals

Production and recording

- Dylan Balliett – Artwork, Photography
- Johnny Fabrizio – Back Cover Photo, Cover Photo
- Jason Link – Layout
- Chris Teti – Engineer, Producer, Programming
- Christopher Yeterian – Assistant Engineer

== Charting ==
Chart (2017)	Peak position
US Heatseekers Albums (Billboard)	7
US Independent Albums (Billboard)	31
US Vinyl Albums (Billboard)	15
