= Songs to Scream at the Sun =

Studio album by Have Heart
- Released: July 8, 2008
- Recorded: by Kurt Ballou, @ GodCity Studios, Salem, Massachusetts
- Genres: Hardcore punk, melodic hardcore
- Length: 21:01
- Label: Bridge Nine
- Producer: Kurt Ballou

Have Heart chronology
You Can't Go Home Again (EP) (2006)	Songs to Scream at the Sun (2008)	10.17.09 (2010)

Professional ratings
Review scores
Source	Rating
Allmusic	3.5/5 stars
Alternative Press	(#242, p.154)
Lambgoat	2.5/5 stars
Punknews.org	4/5 stars
ThePunkSite.com	4/5 stars
Scene Point Blank	8.5/10

Songs to Scream at the Sun is the second and final studio album by American hardcore band Have Heart. The album sold 3,254 copies in its first week and peaked at No. 193 on the Billboard Top 200. The band announced their breakup the next year.

== Reception ==
Reviews of Songs To Scream At The Sun were generally favorable. AllMusic's Greg Prato said that "in a day and age when it's arguably more common than ever to start softening your sound in hopes of crossover success, there's something quite noble in Have Heart's approach... And even when Have Heart take the intensity down a notch or two -- such as on the track "Brotherly Love"—it's still more intense than your average up-and-coming hardcore band," giving the album a 3.5/5. Casey Boland of Alternative Press had a similar review, noting that while the band's influences were obvious on 2006's The Things We Carry, "they now stir them into a unique sound."

== Track listing ==
No.	Title	Length
1.	"The Same Son"	0:58
2.	"Bostons"	2:48
3.	"Pave Paradise"	1:47
4.	"On That Bird in the Cage"	2:11
5.	"Brotherly Love"	2:50
6.	"No Roses, No Skies"	2:22
7.	"The Taste Of The Floor"	0:53
8.	"Reflections"	1:13
9.	"Hard Bark on the Family Tree"	2:58
10.	"The Same Sun"	3:01

== Personnel ==
Members

- Patrick Flynn - vocals
- Ryan Hudon - guitar
- Kei Yasui - guitar
- Ryan Briggs - bass
- Shawn Costa - drums

Production

- Recorded & produced by Kurt Ballou, @ GodCity Recording Studio, Salem, Massachusetts / Q Division (Drums)
- Mastered by Nick Zampiello, @ New Alliance East Mastering, Cambridge, Massachusetts
- Guest vocals by JD, Sean Murphy & Toomey
- Background vocals by Chris Berg, JD, Pauly Edge, Pete Maher & Toomey
- Lyrics by Joni Mitchell & Leo «Recaall» Mooney (Lines Respectfully Borrowed From)
- Author: Edward Estlin Cummings (Liner Notes)
- Design by Kei Yasui
- Photo by Patrick Flynn & Todd Pollock
- Cover photo by Javier Bartlett

== Member quotes ==
"Songs to Scream at the Sun is the coming of age story. It's about the growing process of a young kid shaking the chains of selfishness, but it's everything about what you lose and gain in that process of growing up."

— Patrick Flynn
