= American Nightmare (band) =

American hardcore punk band

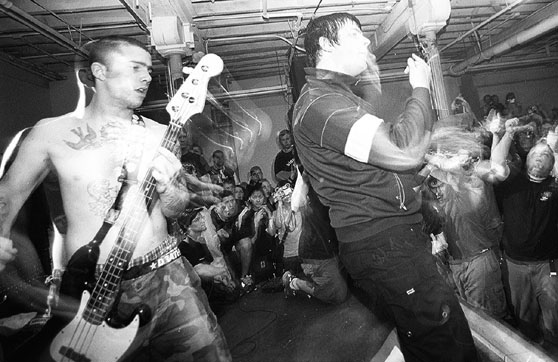

Background information
- Also known as: AN; American Nothing; Give Up the Ghost
- Origin: Boston, Massachusetts, U.S.
- Genres: Hardcore punk, melodic hardcore
- Years active: 1998–2004, 2011–present
- Labels: Rise, Bridge 9, Equal Vision, Burning Heart, Deathwish
- Spinoffs: Cold Cave
- Spinoff of: Ten Yard Fight
- Members: Wesley Eisold; Joshua Holden; Brian Masek; Alex Garcia-Rivera; Jim Carroll
- Past members: Jarrod Alexander; Jesse Gustafson; Nate Helm; Azy Relph; Jesse van Diest; Zachary Wilson; Matt Woods; Tim Cossar; Colin Kimble
- Website: americannightmare.net

American Nightmare (briefly known as Give Up the Ghost) is an American hardcore punk band from Boston, Massachusetts. They have released three albums, one EP and a compilation of earlier released material under the name American Nightmare.

== History ==
=== Formation (1998–2004) ===
American Nightmare was formed when Tim Cossar and Wesley Eisold (who was then a roadie for Ten Yard Fight) met up with Azy Relph and Jesse van Diest in 1998. They recorded a demo tape in 1999, followed by their debut release, a self-titled EP on Bridge 9 Records in 2000. After extensive touring and line-up changes, the band recorded their second EP, The Sun Isn't Getting Any Brighter. This was later combined with their self-titled effort to form Year One, which was released by Reflections Records in 2001 and reissued posthumously by Bridge 9.

Their debut full-length, Background Music, was recorded for Equal Vision Records and released in 2001. They then embarked on multiple tours in support of the album including a Fall North American tour alongside Converge. The extensive touring continued into the following year. In 2003, the band faced a legal battle with a similarly named band from Philadelphia. The band then changed their name briefly to the initials "A.N." then to American Nothing for a brief period. After the other American Nightmare threatened to file suit again, they changed their name to Give Up the Ghost (which was intended to be the name of their second album). Their second full length, We're Down Til We're Underground released on Equal Vision, displayed the band experimenting with their sound, with longer songs that did not follow the typical hardcore songwriting formula they had adhered to in their previous releases.

=== Breakup and aftermath (2004–2010) ===
The band broke up suddenly in June 2004, a day after announcing the cancellation of a European tour. The band issued a statement which cited "health and personal reasons" for the split. Members went on to join/form other bands such as Cold Cave, Some Girls, XO Skeletons, Ye Olde Maids, Head Automatica, Bars, and the Hope Conspiracy. Give Up the Ghost came back into the headlines in 2007 under accusations that Fall Out Boy had taken lyrics from Wes Eisold, the band's lyricist, resulting in an out-of-court settlement and a credit in the liner notes of both the multi-platinum selling From Under the Cork Tree and Infinity on High.

=== Reunion shows (2011–present) ===
After seven years of disbandment, the band reunited under their original name and performed two reunion shows in December 2011. The band performed in Revere, Massachusetts on December 29, and in Los Angeles on December 31. Deathwish Inc. reissued the albums Background Music (2001) and We're Down Til We're Underground (2003) to coincide with the reunion dates. Since the original 2011 reunion shows, American Nightmare have played a small handful of shows almost every year. In 2017 they joined the Togetherfest tour alongside Youth of Today, Trash Talk, Vanishing Life and Wolf Down. In November of that same year they announced a new album for release on February 16, 2018, through Rise Records. The first track from the self-titled album, The World Is Blue, was released December 19, 2017.

In January 2022, the band embarked on a Background Music 20th Anniversary tour, playing the album in its entirety. The tour was supported by Chemical Fix, as well as Gel on the east coast dates and Scowl on the west coast dates.

On May 1, 2023 the group released a 4 song EP titled Dedicated to the Next World.

After not playing any live shows in 2024, the band played a special 25th anniversary show in Brooklyn New York. They also played at Tied Down Fest in Detroit in 2025.

== Musical style and legacy ==
American Nightmare have been categorised as hardcore punk, melodic hardcore and emo. Their music was a reaction against the lyrical positivity of Youth Crew revival bands that had been popular in Boston at the time like In My Eyes, Floorpunch and Bane. The band pursued a more dark and nihilistic sound in comparison through the influence of the Smiths and Joy Division. Other influences include Turning Point, Mission of Burma, the Bruisers, Heroin, the Lemonheads, Slapshot, Bauhaus, Converge, Ink & Dagger, New Order, Unbroken, Orchid, One Last Wish, Archers of Loaf, Cat Power, Leatherface, Avail, Jawbreaker, Lifetime, Sebadoh, SSD, Sick of It All, Moss Icon, Chisel, Suede, Chain of Strength, Sheer Terror, the Afghan Whigs, the Magnetic Fields, Sonic Youth, Eric's Trip, Agnostic Front, Galaxie 500, the Microphones, Cave In, Black Flag, the Cro-Mags and Siouxsie and the Banshees.

Their music often makes use of high-tempos, breakdowns, gang vocals and singalongs.

American Nightmare were highly influential in the 2000s, with their impact being felt in groups as diverse as Fall Out Boy, Hatebreed, Glassjaw, New Found Glory, Converge and AFI. They have been cited as an influence by Modern Life is War, Ceremony, Harm's Way, Incendiary, Deez Nuts, Gallows, the White Noise, Four Year Strong, Thursday, Senses Fail, Pierce the Veil, Frameworks, Killing The Dream, Defeater, Touché Amoré, Dead Swans and Frank Iero of My Chemical Romance and Leathermouth. In 2013 Diffuser.fm named the band to their list of the top 10 best hardcore bands of all time.

== Lawsuit ==
In September 2024, Eisold filed a lawsuit against professional wrestling promotion WWE, professional wrestler Cody Runnels (who wrestles as Cody Rhodes) and online merchandise retailer Fanatics over the "American Nightmare" name and trademark on merchandise. Eisold has held the "American Nightmare" clothing, music and entertainment services trademark since 2016. In 2019, Eisold agreed with Runnels on using the nickname after the latter tried to file a trademark on it. In 2021, Eisold and Runnels entered into an agreement that allowed Runnels to use the trademark so long as the trademark prominently featured Runnels' name, likeness and association with wrestling. In the lawsuit, Eisold claims that WWE, Runnels and Fanatics have violated the agreement by selling merchandise bearing the "American Nightmare" name with little to no reference to Runnels as a wrestler. Eisold also cites confusion in the marketplace by saying that some wear Runnels' merchandise to his band's concerts and that his band is regularly tagged on social media in stories about Runnels. Eisold is seeking at least $150,000 in damages and treble damages of up to $300,000 for federal trademark infringement, in addition to attorneys' expenses.

== Discography ==
=== Studio albums ===
- Background Music (2001, Equal Vision)
- We're Down Til We're Underground (2003, Equal Vision)
- American Nightmare (2018, Rise Records)

=== Compilations ===
- Year One (2001, Bridge 9, Reflections Records)

=== EPs ===
- American Nightmare (2000, Bridge 9)
- The Sun Isn't Getting Any Brighter (2001, Bridge 9)
- Love American (2003, Bridge 9)
- Live in London (2003, Bridge 9)
- Life Support (2020, Deathwish Inc.)
- Dedicated To The Next World (2023, Deathwish Inc.)

=== Compilation contributions ===
- "Depression" – Black on Black: A Tribute to Black Flag (2002, Initial)
- “It’s The Limit” — Still Having Their Say: A Compilation (2017, Bridge 9)
