= Whenever, If Ever =

Studio album by The World Is a Beautiful Place & I Am No Longer Afraid to Die
- Released: June 18, 2013
- Genre: Emo; post-rock; post-hardcore; melodic hardcore; punk rock; indie rock
- Length: 35:16
- Label: Topshelf
- Producer: Chris Teti

The World Is a Beautiful Place & I Am No Longer Afraid to Die chronology
Josh Is Dead (2012)	Whenever, If Ever (2013)	Harmlessness (2015)

Professional ratings
Review scores
Source	Rating
AbsolutePunk	90%
AllMusic	3.5/5 stars
Pitchfork	7.8/10
PopMatters	8/10 stars
Punknews.org	4.5/5 stars
Sputnikmusic	4.5/5

Whenever, If Ever is the debut studio album by American indie rock band The World Is a Beautiful Place & I Am No Longer Afraid to Die, released on June 18, 2013, on Topshelf Records.

== Writing and recording ==
The record was largely written instrumentally as a five-piece band, with the finished versions of the tracks coming together in the studio with the rest of the members contributing their ideas. The album's songs had been written close to a year before the band entered the studio, and the band made demos for all the songs in every stage of the writing process. Guitarist Nicole Shanholtzer noted that many of the songs progressed into something completely different than the direction they started with, while others stayed relatively unchanged. After production had started, Julia Peters offered to perform cello on the record. The band was so impressed with her playing that she was asked to join the band.

== Composition ==
=== Musical style ===
Whenever, If Ever is an emo indie rock album that incorporates elements of hardcore punk, melodic hardcore and post-rock. The album's sound has drawn comparisons to 90s emo and post-hardcore bands such as Mineral, Cap'n Jazz and Sunny Day Real Estate. The album has also been likened to Bright Eyes and the early work of Arcade Fire.

The sound has been described as "cathartic, victorious, and theatrical all at once." The band achieved an atmospheric, thick, and layered sound on the album by using four vocalists that would share vocal duties throughout. Ian Cohen of Pitchfork remarked, "TWIABP sounds like the kind of band where you get the lead vocals simply by wanting it more-- there’s the adenoidal guy, the screaming guy, someone named 'Shitty Greg' who might not be either of them, and they sometimes sing in tandem, initially exaggerating their hiccuping modulations to a degree that feels like trolling; you'll know pretty quickly if you're built for this stuff if 'Kinsella' is your safe word." To further layer the sound, the band used a three guitarists, synthesizers, cellos and trumpets.

=== Lyrics ===
"I think the idea of being self-referential helps connect our entire work into a more cohesive piece about the collective experience of being alive. That is the sort of general idea about the lyrical aspect of our songwriting."

== Legacy ==
Whenever, If Ever is held in high esteem within emo music, especially in its fourth wave, where it's regarded as one of its "most crucial documents". On Spin's 2017 list, it placed #2 out of the emo revival's 30 best albums, only behind Home, Like Noplace Is There by The Hotelier. Writer Briana Younger dubbed it "a masterful journey through the dark" from "a band that believes profoundly in the light at the end of the tunnel". She praised the "remarkable conviction" that they portrayed "effective idealistic angst" with, which "is a rare achievement for past and revival bands alike".

=== Accolades ===
Critical rankings for Whenever, If Ever
Publication	List	Year	Rank	Ref.
Spin	30 Best Emo Revival Albums, Ranked	2017	2	
BrooklynVegan	100 Best Punk & Emo Albums of the 2010s	2019	47	
Consequence	The Top 15 Emo Albums of the Last 15 Years	2022	8	

== Track listing ==
All music is composed by The World Is a Beautiful Place & I Am No Longer Afraid to Die.

No.	Title	Length
1.	"blank #9"	2:13
2.	"Heartbeat in the Brain"	5:42
3.	"Fightboat"	2:05
4.	"Picture of a Tree That Doesn't Look Okay"	4:01
5.	"You Will Never Go to Space"	2:25
6.	"The Layers of Skin We Drag Around"	1:33
7.	"Ultimate Steve"	4:04
8.	"Gig Life"	2:59
9.	"Low Light Assembly"	3:20
10.	"Getting Sodas"	7:00
Total length:		35:16

== Personnel ==
- Thomas Diaz – vocals, guitar, synthesizer
- David Bello – vocals
- Nicole Shanholtzer – guitar, vocals
- Joshua Cyr – bass guitar, synthesizer
- Katie Shanholtzer-Dvorak - synthesizer, vocals
- Steven Buttery – percussion
- Christopher Teti – guitar
- Julia Peters – cello
- Patrick Malone – trumpet
- Greg Horbal – guitar, vocals, piano, synthesizer

== Chart performance ==
Chart (2013)	Peak position
U.S. Billboard Vinyl Albums	3
