= Pat Flynn (punk singer) =

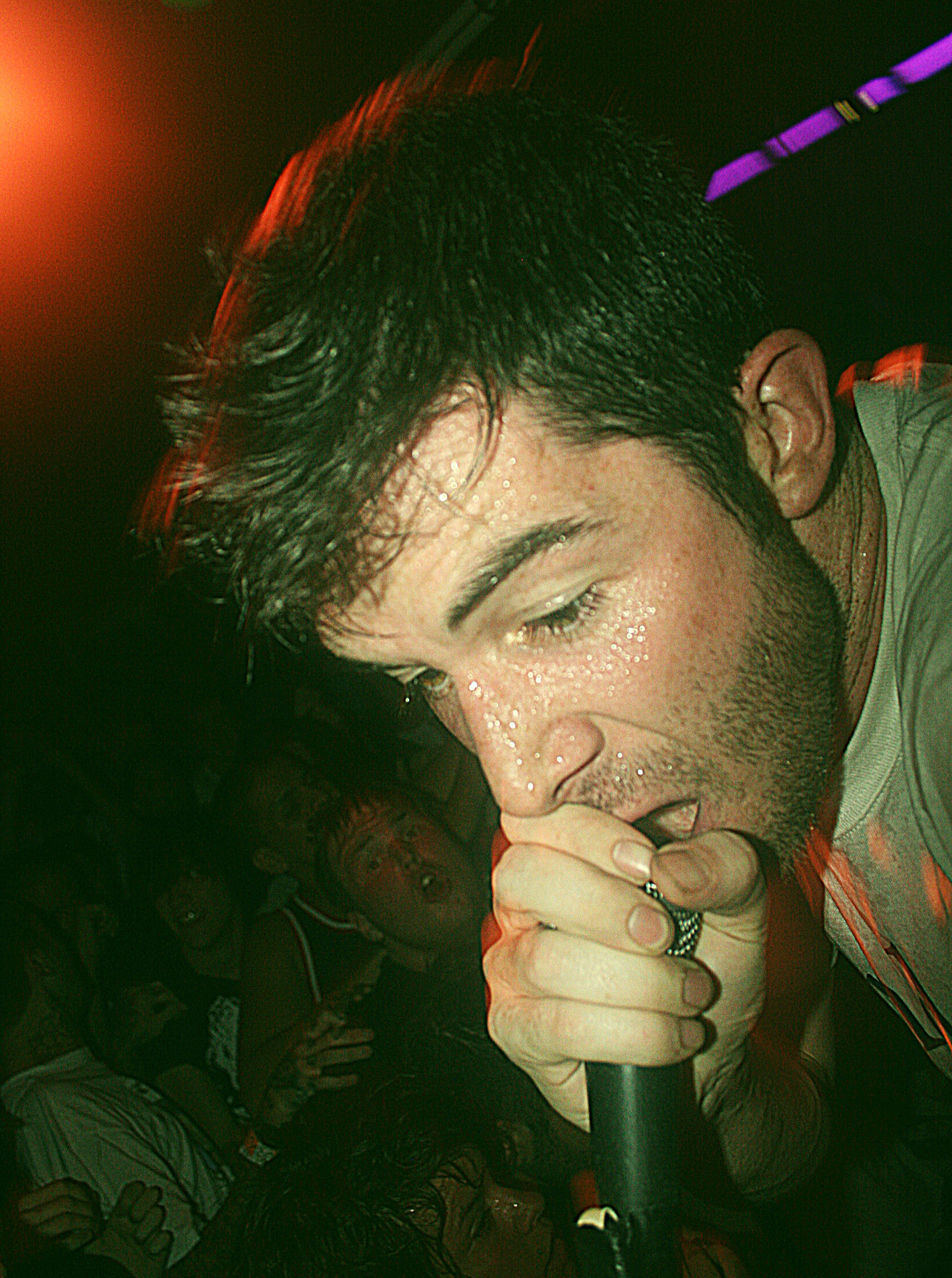
- Flynn performing with Have Heart in 2009

Background information
- Born: Patrick Flynn; 1985 (age 40–41)
- Origin: New Bedford, Massachusetts, U.S.
- Genres: Hardcore punk; post-hardcore; melodic hardcore
- Occupations: Singer; songwriter; teacher
- Instrument: Vocals
- Years active: 2002–present
- Labels: Bridge Nine, Run For Cover
- Member of: Fiddlehead, How Much Art, Have Heart
- Formerly of: Free, Sweet Jesus, Clear

Patrick Flynn (born 1985) is an American punk rock vocalist, songwriter, and schoolteacher, best known as the frontman of the hardcore band Have Heart and the post-hardcore band Fiddlehead. Active in the Boston hardcore scene since the early 2000s, Flynn gained prominence leading Have Heart from its formation in 2002 until its breakup in 2009. He later co-founded Fiddlehead in 2014 and has fronted the group through three studio albums in the 2010s–2020s.

== Early life ==
Flynn grew up in a military family and moved frequently during childhood; his father, Richard Flynn, was a U.S. Army officer and speechwriter for General Colin Powell. In his youth Flynn developed a passion for punk and alternative music. During his teens, his family settled in southeastern Massachusetts, and Flynn became involved in the straight-edge hardcore scene of New Bedford. He attended a Catholic high school and cultivated a strong interest in history, which he went on to study in college.

== Career ==
=== Have Heart ===
In 2002, at age 16, Flynn co-founded the hardcore punk band Have Heart in New Bedford, serving as lead vocalist and lyricist. Have Heart became a key part of the 2000s Boston hardcore scene, being described as a seminal straight-edge band in the genre. The group's debut album, The Things We Carry, was released in 2006 on Bridge Nine Records, followed by Songs to Scream at the Sun in 2008; both records were acclaimed in hardcore circles. Have Heart disbanded in October 2009 after a final show on National Edge Day.

After Have Heart's breakup, Flynn pursued a career as a schoolteacher but remained musically active. In 2010 he and former members of bands like Dropdead formed the hardcore project Sweet Jesus, which issued a demo and later an album. The following year, Flynn and guitarist Austin Stemper launched a straight-edge band called Clear, releasing a demo in 2011. By 2015, four of the final Have Heart members (including Flynn) regrouped under the new name Free, releasing a self-titled demo (2015) and the EP Ex Tenebris (2017). Flynn said that they chose to not continue as "Have Heart" in order to avoid overshadowing younger bands in the scene.

=== Fiddlehead and later projects ===
Flynn's next major project was Fiddlehead, a post-hardcore band he formed in 2014 with Have Heart drummer Shawn Costa and members of the U.K. rock band Basement. Fiddlehead debuted with a self-titled 2014 demo and signed to Run For Cover Records in 2018. The band's first full-length album, Springtime and Blind (2018), was written as a concept record processing the death of Flynn's father in 2010 and its emotional aftermath. Critics noted the album's heartfelt exploration of grief was unusual for hardcore music. Fiddlehead's second album, Between the Richness, followed in 2021, further reflecting on themes of fatherhood and legacy. Their third album, Death Is Nothing to Us (2023), completed what was characterized as a trilogy on depression and grief. The title of the album was inspired by a line from the Roman poet Lucretius ("Death is nothing to us").

Although Fiddlehead features a more melodic, post-hardcore sound than Flynn's earlier work, the band maintains a hardcore intensity in live shows. Due to Flynn's full-time job as a teacher and other members' commitments, Fiddlehead operates as a part-time project and tours only sparingly. In July 2019, Flynn reunited with Have Heart for a limited run of reunion concerts, including an outdoor show in Worcester, Massachusetts that drew over 8,000 attendees, reportedly one of the largest hardcore audiences ever in the United States. Have Heart returned again for five farewell shows in 2024, headlining major hardcore festivals in the U.S. and U.K. (such as Sound and Fury and Outbreak Fest) and concluding with sold-out hometown dates in Boston.

Outside of Fiddlehead, Flynn has continued to launch new musical projects. In 2025, he and Shawn Costa formed a band called How Much Art, joined by members of the hardcore bands Gel and Down. How Much Art's debut single, "PR," was released in mid-2025 on Convulse Records as a preview of their EP Public Relations.

On October 17, 2026, Flynn appeared on stage during Slapshot’s farewell show to perform a cover of the Last Rights song "Chunks".

== Musical style and influences ==
Flynn's songwriting is noted for its emotional depth, which, according to critics, distinguished him among hardcore punk vocalists. Lyrically, he often draws from personal experience, including family relationships, loss, and mental health, topics that were once uncommon in the hardcore genre. For example, Have Heart's song "Unbreakable" (on 2006's The Things We Carry) was written about Flynn's grandfather, an unusually intimate subject for the scene at that time. With Fiddlehead, Flynn has continued this autobiographical approach: many songs (and entire albums) address the death of his father and his own journey through grief and healing. Across three albums, Fiddlehead's lyrics trace a narrative arc from mourning to acceptance, a trilogy that Pitchfork described as "about grief, depression, and fighting to move forward in the face of loss".

In addition to their confessional nature, Flynn's lyrics frequently incorporate literary and historical references. He has cited influences ranging from punk and hardcore legends to authors and poets. The title of Death Is Nothing to Us was taken from Lucretius via historian Stephen Greenblatt's book The Swerve, which Flynn read while writing the album. On the song "True Hardcore (II)" he critiques elitism in subcultures using language reminiscent of his Catholic school experiences, and elsewhere he has quoted lines from W.B. Yeats and alternative rock artists like Alex G and the Cranberries in his songs. According to Arun Starkey of Far Out, Flynn's style has evolved from the raw, shouted vocals of Have Heart's hardcore to a more melodic delivery in Fiddlehead's post-hardcore sound.

== Personal life ==
Flynn is married and has two children. He resides in Massachusetts and works as a high school history teacher, a role he began after Have Heart's initial breakup. He continues to identify with the straight-edge punk subculture, maintaining a sober lifestyle.

== Discography ==
=== Studio albums with Have Heart ===
- The Things We Carry (2006, Bridge Nine Records)
- Songs to Scream at the Sun (2008, Bridge Nine Records)

EPs with Have Heart

- What Counts (2004, Think Fast! Records)
- You Can't Go Home Again (2008, Bridge Nine Records)

Studio albums with Fiddlehead

- Springtime and Blind (2018, Run For Cover Records)
- Between the Richness (2021, Run For Cover Records)
- Death Is Nothing to Us (2023, Run For Cover Records)

EPs with Fiddlehead

- Out of the Bloom (2015, Lockin' Out) – demo EP
- Get My Mind Right (2019, Run For Cover Records)
- Baby I'll Change (2026, Run For Cover Records)

with Free

- Demo 2015 (2015, self-released)
- Ex Tenebris (EP, 2017, Triple-B Records)
