= Have Heart =

American hardcore punk band

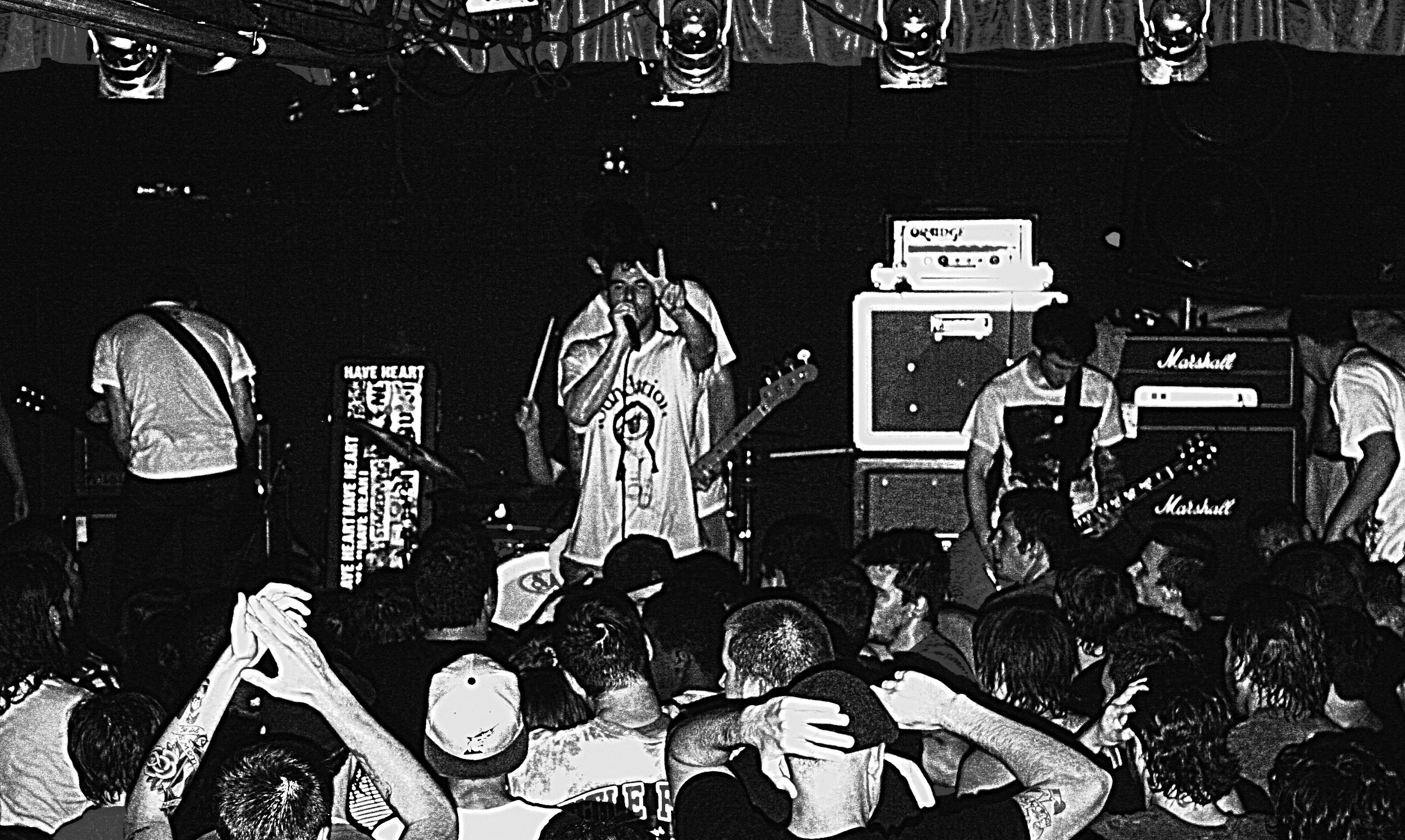
- Have Heart in 2009

Background information
- Origin: New Bedford, Massachusetts, U.S.
- Genres: Hardcore punk; melodic hardcore
- Years active: 2002–2009; 2019; 2024; 2026–present
- Label: Bridge Nine
- Spinoffs: Fiddlehead, Free
- Past members: Patrick Flynn; Ryan Hudon; Kei Yasui; Austin Stemper; Shawn Costa; Ryan Briggs; Ryan Willis; Eric St. Jacques; Justin Paling; Vincent Conti; Ben Kelly
- Website: haveheartusa.com

Have Heart are an American straight edge hardcore punk band formed in New Bedford, Massachusetts in 2002. The band recorded a demo that was released in 2003. In 2004, they released the What Counts EP (Think Fast! Records), with their debut full-length, The Things We Carry (Bridge Nine Records) arriving in 2006. Their last full-length, Songs to Scream at the Sun (Bridge Nine Records), arrived in 2008.

== History ==
Part of the resurgent Boston hardcore scene, Have Heart formed in 2002 around the core lineup of singer Patrick Flynn, guitarist Ryan Hudon, and bassist Ryan Briggs. Hailing from the coastal town of New Bedford, the trio moved to Boston after graduating high school. Initially working with a revolving lineup of local musicians, the band played their first show in July 2003, and in November, their debut demo was released. The demo came to the attention of Think Fast! Records, who signed them for the release of the What Counts EP in 2004.

In 2005, Have Heart moved to the estimable hardcore indie Bridge Nine Records and underwent a lineup change, with Paling replaced by Kei Yasui and Shawn Costa, respectively. The following year they released The Things We Carry, their first full length. In 2007, the band toured through the U.S., Canada, Europe, and later, South America

In 2008, the band released their second full-length album on Bridge Nine, Songs to Scream at the Sun, which debuted and peaked at No. 193 on the Billboard 200 and No. 16 on the Top Heatseekers chart.

=== 2009: Disbandment ===
On May 13, 2009, vocalist Patrick Flynn told the world that Have Heart was breaking up after they completed their scheduled world tour, posting a bulletin on the group's Myspace account:

"Once the Fall rolls around, we can't really do this band the way we would prefer to anymore. Knowing this deadline of ours and having a whole world tour already booked, we'd like to take advantage of the chance to say goodbye to all the people we have met around the world over the years.

So, please come check us out in the remaining months on our little trip around the globe. So far Asia has been a wonderful experience and we're very happy to have had the chance to meet so many kind people and look forward to the rest of Asia.

We will be playing our last show on this year's National Edge Day on October 17, 2009 with a bunch of our friends bands and a sweet guest. It will be somewhere T accessible in the Boston area. It will also be a benefit for a women's shelter in New Bedford, MA, run by my kind mother.

It's been a nice 7 years and we'd like to thank all the unique hardcore kids and bands we have encountered. We have met so many wonderful people who we'll just never forget.

It's been so great. Take care and hope to see you over the next couple months."

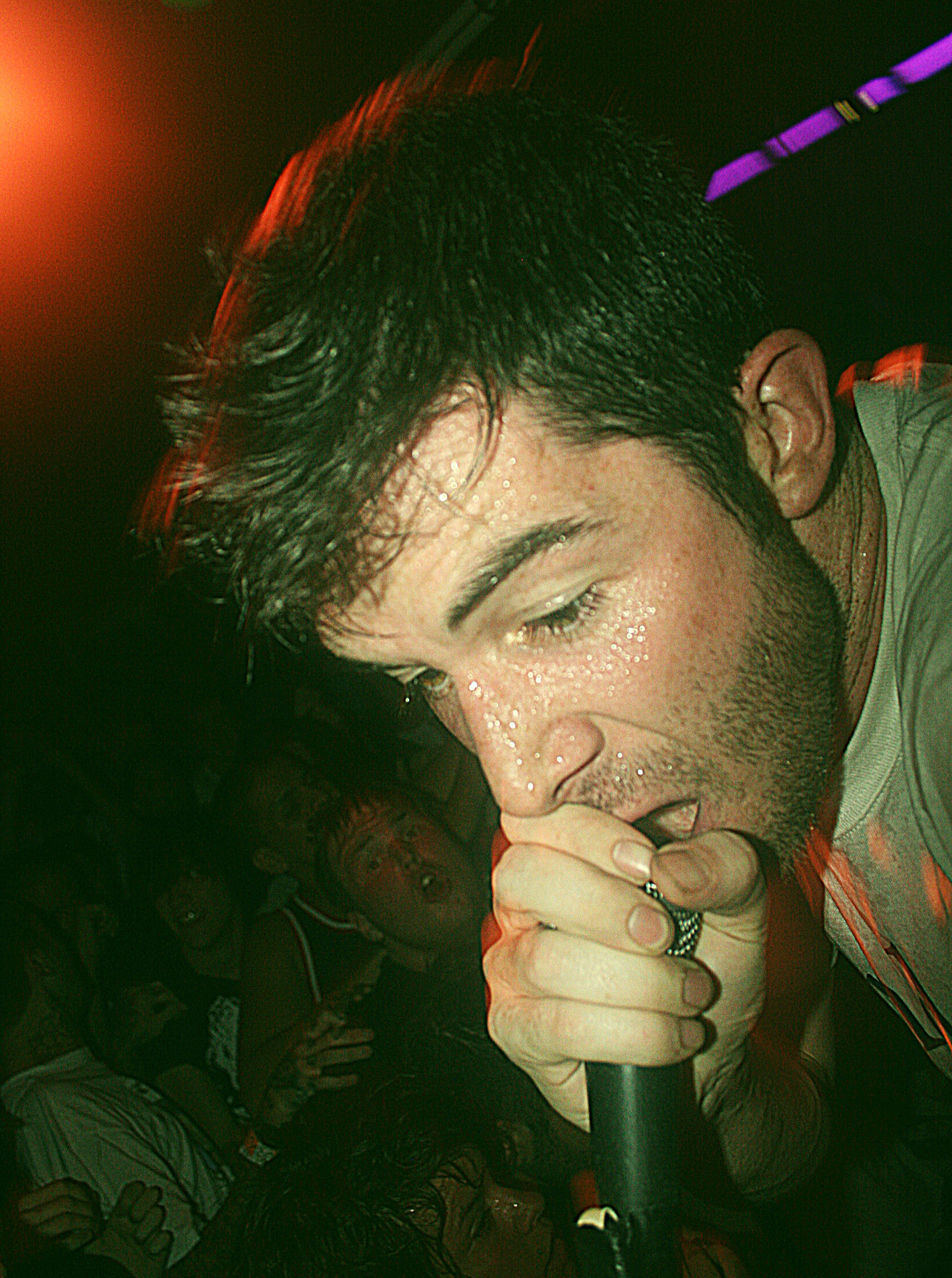
Flynn performing in 2009

On May 13, Have Heart announced that after finishing their world tour and doing a final show on October 17, 2009 for National Edge Day in Massachusetts, they would split. Their final tour with support from Shipwreck covered every major continent. However, due to a family crisis, Flynn was absent during the first week of shows on the European tour. In this time, Sam Yarmuth from Triple B Records filled in for Flynn, and he rejoined the tour on July 3 in Wiesbaden, Germany. On July 25, 2009, Pat Flynn told the audience during their set on Moshvalleyfest in Belgium that they might release a last EP later that year, though this plan was later scratched. A day later on July 26, they played Fluff Fest in Czechia.

Bridge Nine Records posthumously released a live recording of Have Heart's final show, titled 10.17.09, on November 23, 2010. The release features, in one package, the performance on both CD and DVD. Included with 10.17.09 was a pamphlet announcing We Were Supposed to Stay Young, an upcoming DVD chronicling the band's career and general scene of the time. Named after lyrics from Minor Threat's "Betray", the DVD was set to be released at some point in 2012.

Final show

Have Heart's final show was played on National Edge Day 2009 in Revere, Massachusetts, along with other straight edge bands.

=== 2010–2014: Post-breakup ===
Following the disbandment of Have Heart, Patrick Flynn began working as a history teacher but he and the other members remained active in their local scenes. Flynn and Costa, along with members of Dropdead, Fucking Invincible, and Voices Forming Weapons, formed the band Sweet Jesus in 2010. Flynn and Stemper formed the straight edge band Clear and released a demo in 2011. Flynn, Costa and members of Basement formed the group Fiddlehead and released their first demo in 2014.

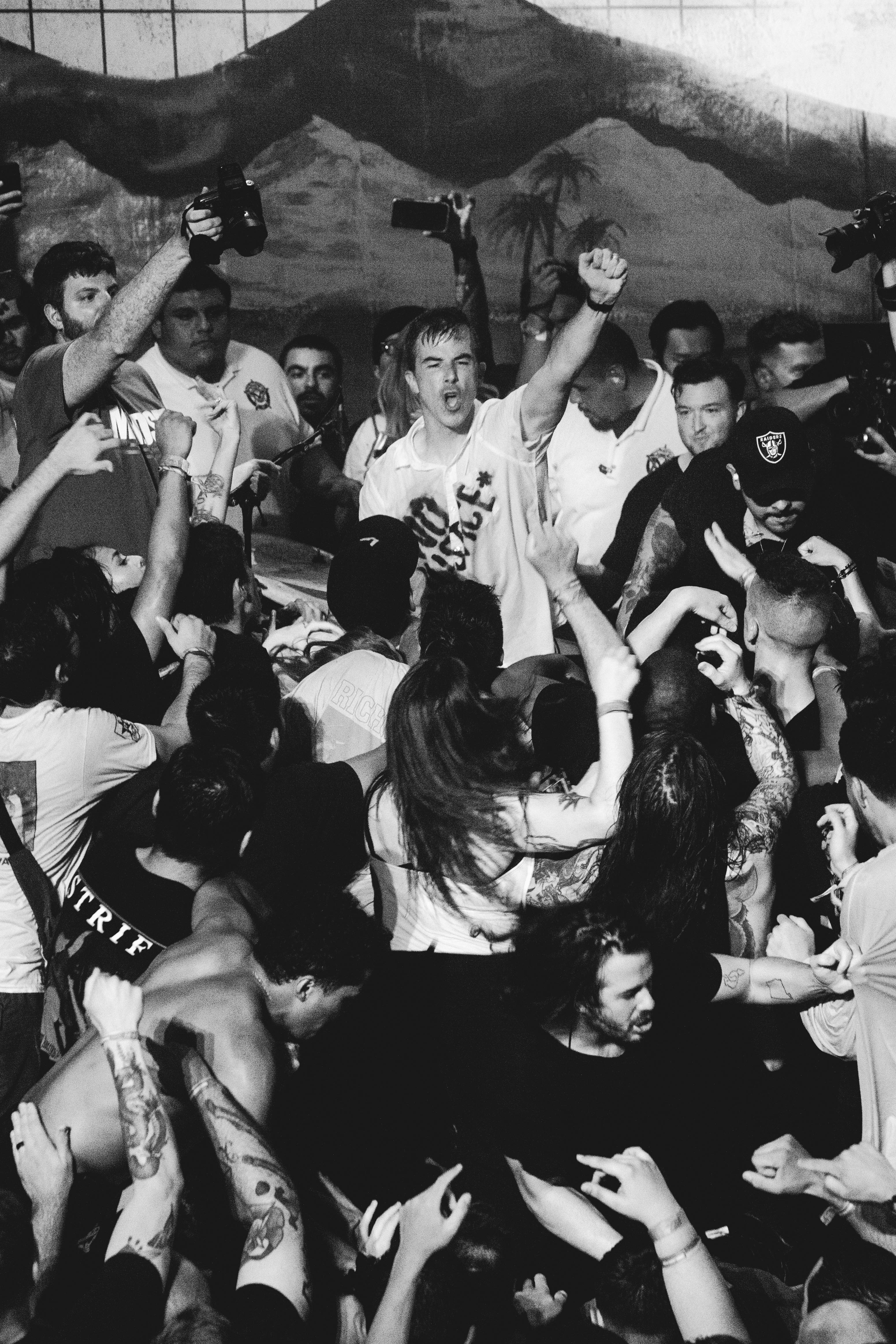
Have Heart performing in 2019

=== 2015–present: Free and reunion tours ===
In 2015, four of the final five members of Have Heart – Patrick Flynn, Kei Yasui, Shawn Costa, and Ryan Hudon – in addition to the band's 2009 touring guitarist, Austin Stemper – formed the band "Free". Free released a four-track, self-titled demo recorded by Trevor Vaughan (Sex Positions, Soul Control) in their home of New Bedford, MA on November 29, 2015, followed by another EP titled Ex Tenebris on May 15, 2017, which also consisted of four songs, recorded by Will Killingsworth at Dead Air Studios. Flynn stated that although they kept the last lineup and same creative process, they changed the band's name in order to not take "the spotlight" away from younger hardcore bands.

In February 2019, the line-up of Free announced they would be playing eight shows under the name "Have Heart" in Leeds, Boston, Los Angeles and Cologne in July 2019. To promote a sale in their webstore and to celebrate the return of Have Heart, Bridge 9 pressed the previously unreleased track from the Songs to Scream at the Sun sessions titled "Lions and Lambs" as a stand-alone limited-edition 7" single in March 2019. The single was also uploaded to most streaming services. According to Kei Yasui, attendance of their Worcester outdoor show was around 8560. The large audience at their reunion has it considered as the biggest hardcore show ever.

On February 13, 2024, the band announced five reunion dates, set to take place between June 2 and July 24 of the same year, including a co-headline spot at the Saturday of Outbreak Festival and headline spots at Sound and Fury and Tied Down festivals.

On June 28, 2026, Have Heart announced their reunion with the headline slot for the 2027 edition of the Netherland's Revolution Rising Festival. Throughout Fall 2026, the band will play a short reunion headlining tour throughout the US.

== Musical style and influences ==
According to vocalist Pat Flynn, the band was formed with the intention of recreating the sound of youth crew bands, however as the band progressed their songwriting evolved to be more melodic. They have cited influences including Swiz, Turning Point, Inside Out, Crossed Out, Embrace, Count Me Out and In My Eyes.

== Band members ==
Current line-up

- Patrick Flynn – vocals (2002–2009, 2019, 2024, 2026–present)
- Ryan Hudon – guitar (2002–2009, 2019, 2024, 2026–present)
- Kei Yasui – guitar (2005–2009, 2019, 2024, 2026–present)
- Shawn Costa – drums (2005–2009, 2019, 2024, 2026–present)

Former members

- Ryan Briggs – bass (2002–2009)
- Ryan Willis – guitar (2002–2003)
- Eric St. Jacques – guitar (2002–2004)
- Ben Kelly – guitar (2004)
- Justin Paling – drums (2002–2005)
- Austin Stemper – bass (2019); guitar (2009, touring)

Touring musicians

- Evan Radigan – drums (2004)
- Trevor Vaughan – bass (2004, 2024)
- Chris Cox – drums (2005)
- J.D. Shipwreck – bass (2005)

== Discography ==
Year	Title	Peak chart positions		Record company
Year	Title	US	US Heat	Record company
2003	2003 (EP)	—	—	Bottled Up Records
2004	What Counts (EP)	—	—	Think Fast! Records
2006	The Things We Carry	—	—	Bridge Nine Records
2008	You Can't Go Home Again (EP)	—	—	Bridge Nine Records
2008	Songs to Scream at the Sun	193	16	Bridge Nine Records
2010	10.17.09 (live album)	—	—	Bridge Nine Records
