= Harmlessness =

Studio album by The World Is a Beautiful Place & I Am No Longer Afraid to Die
- Released: September 25, 2015
- Genres: Indie rock; emo; post-rock
- Length: 61:03
- Label: Epitaph
- Producer: Chris Teti

The World Is a Beautiful Place & I Am No Longer Afraid to Die chronology
Whenever, If Ever (2013)	Harmlessness (2015)	Always Foreign (2017)

Harmlessness is the second studio album by American indie rock band The World Is a Beautiful Place & I Am No Longer Afraid to Die. It was announced on August 4, 2015, and was released on September 25, 2015. The title of the album is a play on the name of the band's first EP, Formlessness.

== Reception ==
Professional ratings
Aggregate scores
Source	Rating
Metacritic	84/100
Review scores
Source	Rating
AbsolutePunk	10/10 stars
Alternative Press	3.5/5 stars
Blurt	5/5 stars
Pitchfork	7.9/10
Punknews.org	4/5 stars
Under the Radar	7.5/10

Harmlessness charted at number 11 on the Heatseekers Albums chart, and at number 46 on the Independent Albums chart. Upon release, the album received critical acclaim. At Metacritic, which assigns a normalized rating out of 100 to reviews from specialized critics, the album received an average score of 84, based on 6 reviews. Stereogum placed the album at number 13 on their top 50 albums of 2015 list. James of Stereogum wrote: "It's not the kind of music that will change the world, but it might just change your life." Aaron Mook of AbsolutePunk wrote: "Harmlessness is ambitious and intimidating in scope; it is not an easy listen, but with the right amount of time and dedication, it is easily one of the most rewarding listens of 2015." "January 10th, 2014" appeared on a best-of emo songs list by Vulture.

=== Legacy ===
In 2017, Harmlessness placed seventh on Spin's list of the emo revival's 30 best albums, with writer Ian Cohen dubbing it "one of the most stunningly accomplished indie rock records of the past decade." Several months later, Cohen called it "an astonishing redirection" for indie rock, seeing it anticipate the genre's impending fusion of the late 90's Pacific Northwest scene's "experimental and expanse" with mid-00s Canadian indie's "grandeur" that would give way to the emo revival. In 2021, Exclaim!'s Adam Feibel wrote that the album had "frequently been held up as [the band's] crowning achievement".

=== Accolades ===
Publication	Accolade	Year	Rank
Stereogum	The 50 Best Albums of 2015	2015	13
Brooklyn Magazine	The 20 Best Rock Albums of 2015	2015	1
BrooklynVegan	Our 50 Favorite Albums of 2015	2015	--
AbsolutePunk	Staff's Top 30 Albums of 2015	2015	5

== Track listing ==
All music is composed by David F. Bello, Tyler Bussey, Steven K. Buttery, Joshua Cyr, Katie Dvorak, Greg Horbal, Derrick Shanholtzer and Chris Teti, except as noted

No.	Title	Writer(s)	Length
1.	"You Can't Live There Forever"	Bello, Buttery, Cyr, Dvorak, Shanholtzer, Teti	4:01
2.	"blank #11"	Shanholtzer, Teti	1:09
3.	"January 10th, 2014"		5:39
4.	"The Word Lisa"		2:03
5.	"Rage Against the Dying of the Light"	Bello, Bussey, Buttery, Cyr, Dvorak, Shanholtzer, Teti	3:29
6.	"Ra Patera Dance"		4:30
7.	"Mental Health"	Bello, Bussey, Buttery, Cyr, Dvorak	4:07
8.	"Wendover"		2:57
9.	"We Need More Skulls"	Bello, Bussey, Buttery, Cyr, Shanholtzer, Teti	4:20
10.	"Haircuts for Everybody"		2:44
11.	"Willie (For Howard)"		3:10
12.	"I Can Be Afraid of Anything"		7:10
13.	"Mount Hum" (ends at 8:20; hidden track "Make Mistakes" begins at 11:28)		15:44
Total length:			61:03

iTunes bonus track
No.	Title	Writer(s)	Length
14.	"Make Mistakes" (hidden track on CD version, see above)	Bussey, Buttery, Cyr, Shanholtzer, Teti	4:16

== Personnel ==
The lineup for this album is:

- David Bello - vocals
- Nicole Shanholtzer - guitar, vocals
- Josh Cyr - bass guitar, acoustic guitar
- Katie Dvorak - synthesizer, vocals
- Steven Buttery - percussion
- Chris Teti - production, engineering, mixing, guitar, vocals, percussion
- Nick Kwas - violin
- Tyler Bussey - guitar, banjo, vocals
- Greg Horbal - guitar
