= Positive hardcore =

Music genre

- Stylistic origins: Musical: Hardcore punk; melodic hardcore; Ideological: Social consciousness; community orientation; nonviolence
- Cultural origins: 1980s
- Typical instruments: Vocals; electric guitar; bass; drums

Other topics
- Easycore; queercore; riot grrrl; youth crew

Positive hardcore (sometimes shortened to posicore or posi-core) is a branch of the hardcore punk music scene that is socially aware, or focuses on values such as being inclusive, community-oriented, and anti-violent. The genre was created as a backlash to the violence and negativity in the straight edge scene.

== History ==
Since the term was coined in the 1980s, it has been applied to a divergent group of musical styles and bands including 7 Seconds, Youth of Today, Good Clean Fun, and The Wonder Years. Early positive hardcore bands in the 1980s and 1990s sang about social issues such as the treatment of the LGBT community by the hardcore punk scene as well as non-violence and scene unity. These were topics that the hardliners rejected. In the late 2000s through the 2010s there has been a renaissance in the genre. Instead of being a backlash against hardline, the renaissance comes from a backlash against the dominant metalcore bands in the scene during the 2010s.

== References and Bibliography ==
- Ensminger, D. A. (2011). Visual Vitriol: The Street Art and Subcultures of the Punk and Hardcore Generation. Jackson: University Press of Mississippi.
- Haenfler, R. (2006). Straight edge: Clean-living youth, hardcore punk, and social change. Piscataway: Rutgers University Press.
- Kuhn, G. (2010). Sober Living for the Revolution: Hardcore Punk, Straight Edge, and Radical Politics. Oakland: PM Press.
- Martin, T. (2011). Like Rats is an unlikely opener. Accessed from Northern Star http://northernstar.info/dekalb_scene/article_edf0bc0a-63dd-11e0-bf9c-001a4bcf6878.html
- Reyes, I. (2008). Sound, technology, and interpretation in subcultures of heavy music production. (Doctoral dissertation). Retrieved from ProQuest. (AAT 3322362)
- Wood, R. T. (2006). Straight Edge Youth: The Complexity and Contradictions of a Subculture. Syracuse: Syracuse University Press.
