= Post Festival =

Music festival

- Genre: Post-rock, post-metal, post-hardcore
- Date: October
- Founders: Derek Vorndran and Nason Frizzell
- Website: www.thepostfestival.com

Post Festival (stylized as Post. Festival) is a music festival held in Indianapolis, Indiana focused on post-rock and post-metal music. The event was founded by Derek Vorndran and Nason Frizzell, who are natives to the state of Indiana.

Converge, Cave In, A Place to Bury Strangers, This Will Destroy You, and We Lost the Sea are examples of acts who have played this festival. Notably, Cave In was forced to cancel an appearance at the festival after guitarist Adam McGrath broke his arm. Pelican also appeared at the festival in 2025.

== See also ==
- BLED Fest, a punk rock festival that was held in Michigan that was held from 2008 to 2019
