= Background Music (album) =

2001 studio album by American Nightmare

Studio album by American Nightmare
- Released: June 12, 2001
- Genre: Hardcore punk
- Length: 23:33
- Label: Equal Vision (EVR062)

American Nightmare chronology
The Sun Isn't Getting Any Brighter (2001)	Background Music (2001)	We're Down Til We're Underground (2003)

Professional ratings
Review scores
Source	Rating
Allmusic	1.5/5 stars
Punknews.org	3/5 stars

Background Music is the debut studio album by the American hardcore punk band American Nightmare. The album was originally released on June 12, 2001 through Equal Vision Records. Background Music was later reissued in 2003 under the name Give Up the Ghost after another band named American Nightmare filed a cease and desist order. Background Music was also reissued in 2011 through Deathwish Inc. in celebration of the band's reunion shows.

== Track listing ==
1. "(We Are)" – 2:38
2. "There's a Black Hole in the Shadow of the Pru" – 2:00
3. "AM/PM" – 3:05
4. "Shoplifting in a Ghost Town" – 2:51
5. "I Saved Latin" – 0:22
6. "Postmark My Compass" – 2:15
7. "I.C. You Are Feeling Drake" – 2:09
8. "Hearts" – 1:03
9. "God Save the Queen" – 2:00
10. "Your Arsonist" – 2:48
11. "Farewell" – 2:22
