= Fiddlehead (band) =

American post-hardcore supergroup

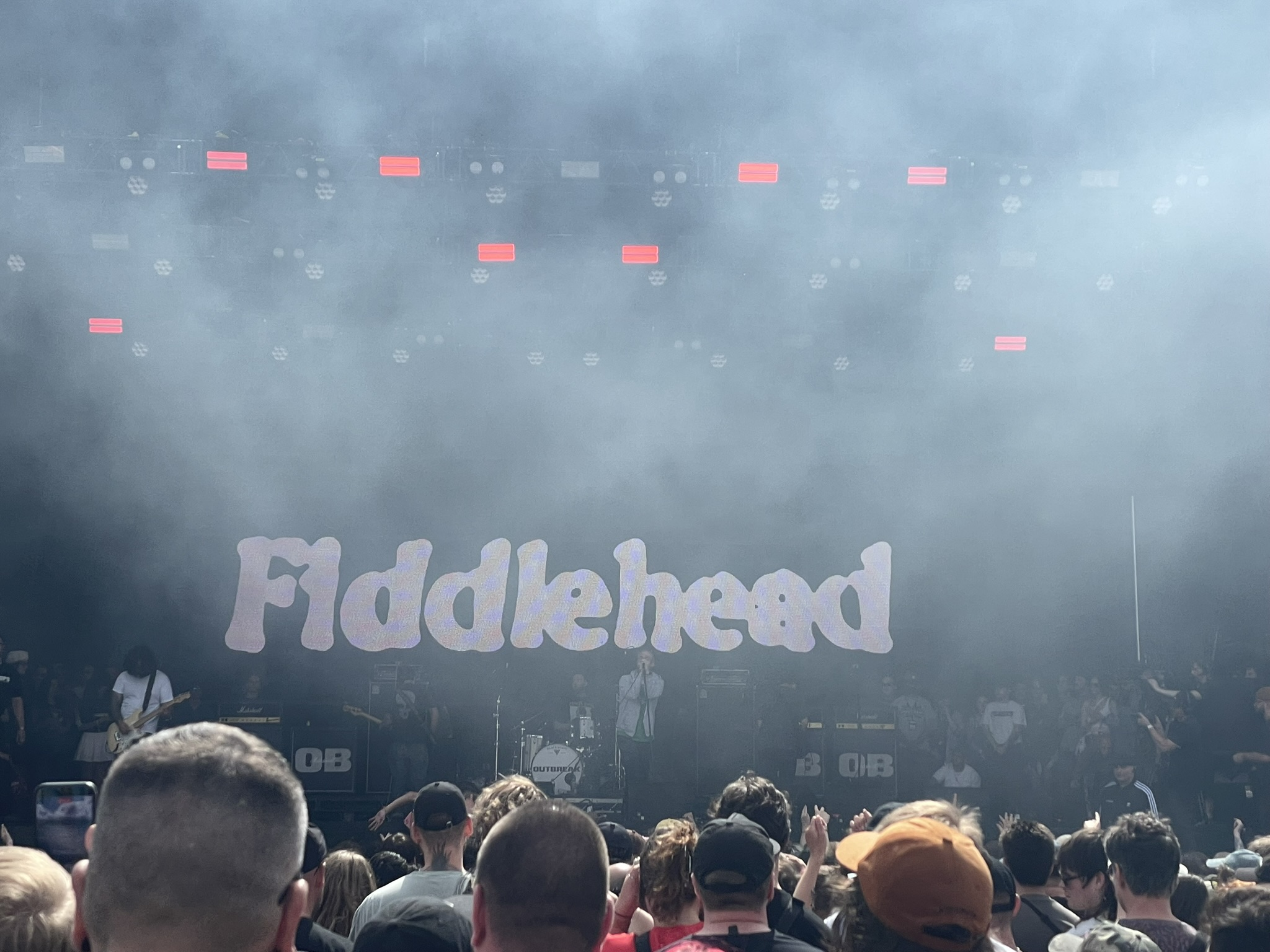

Background information
- Origin: Boston, Massachusetts
- Genres: Post-hardcore; soft grunge; melodic hardcore; emo
- Years active: 2014–present
- Label: Run For Cover
- Spinoffs: Free
- Spinoff of: Have Heart; Basement; Big Contest; Death Injection; Sweet Jesus; Verse
- Members: Patrick Flynn; Alex Henery; Alex Dow; Shawn Costa; Niklás Hinsch

Fiddlehead is an American post-hardcore supergroup formed in Boston, Massachusetts. The band's current line-up consists of Patrick Flynn (vocals) and Shawn Costa (drums) of Have Heart, Alex Henery (guitar) of Basement, Alex Dow (guitar) of Big Contest, and Nick Hinsch (bass) of Stand Off and Nuclear Age.

== History ==
Fiddlehead released their first EP in 2014, titled Out of the Bloom. In 2018, Fiddlehead signed to the Boston record label Run for Cover Records and released their debut full-length album Springtime and Blind. In 2021, they released their second full-length on Run for Cover, Between the Richness. In 2023, they released their third full-length on Run for Cover, Death Is Nothing to Us.

The band rarely participates in full-length tours, often due to Patrick Flynn's full-time career as a high school history teacher. Instead, the band tends to commit to one-off shows or small weekend tours of a single region at a time. One example includes an appearance they made at Tied Down Fest in Detroit in 2025.

== Band members ==
- Patrick Flynn – lead vocals (2014–present)
- Alex Henery – guitar, backing vocals (2014–present)
- Alex Dow – bass guitar (2014–present)
- Shawn Costa – drums (2014–present)
- Nick Hinsch – guitar (2021–present)

Former members

- Adam Gonsalves – bass (2014–2016)
- Casey Nealon – bass (2016–2021)

== Discography ==
Studio albums

- Springtime and Blind (2018, Run for Cover Records)
- Between the Richness (2021, Run for Cover Records)
- Death Is Nothing to Us (2023, Run for Cover Records)

EPs

- Out of the Bloom (2014, Lockin' Out)
- Get My Mind Right (2019, Run for Cover Records)
- Baby I'll Change (2026, Run for Cover Records)
