= Youth crew =

Music subculture of hardcore punk

- Stylistic origins: Straight edge; hardcore punk
- Cultural origins: Mid-1980s, United States
- Derivative forms: Bandana thrash; heavy hardcore; positive hardcore

Other topics
- Moshing; straight edge; DIY punk ethic; positive mental attitude

Youth crew is a music subculture of hardcore punk, which was particularly prominent during the New York hardcore scene of the late 1980s. Youth crew is distinguished from other punk styles by its optimism and moralistic outlook. The original youth crew bands and fans were predominantly straight edge (abstaining from alcohol and drugs) and vegetarian.

Early musical influences included Minor Threat, Bad Brains, Negative Approach, 7 Seconds, and Black Flag. While some youth crew music is similar to melodic hardcore, other styles can be very thrash metal-influenced and also includes breakdowns intended for the hardcore dancing style associated with live performances. Youth crew bands exhibited a range of influences and sounds. Later youth crew bands took increasing influence from heavy metal.

== Etymology ==
The term crew was used by many first wave hardcore punk bands of the early 80s. 7 Seconds named their debut LP record The Crew in 1984, which also contained the song "The Crew". Some other notable examples of this are Boston straight edge bands like SS Decontrol, Negative FX, DYS and other associates calling themselves the "Boston Crew", bands in the Reno area (most notably 7 Seconds) used to refer to themselves as the "Skeeno Crew". John L Hancock III (aka RatBoy) designed a T-shirt and wrote the Youth of Today song "Youth Crew" which appeared on their 1985 Can't Close My Eyes 7". Warzone also had a song called "We're the Crew" on their 1988 album Don't Forget the Struggle, Don't Forget the Streets. Judge also released a song called "New York Crew" in 1988.

== History ==
Youth crew was most popular from 1985 to 1992, primarily in New York City tri-state region and, to a lesser degree, California. It was inspired by bands such as 7 Seconds, Minor Threat and SSD, whose members were all straight edge, and lyrical concerns included brotherhood and community values. The sound was largely defined by a series of releases by labels such as Revelation Records, including albums by Youth of Today, Chain of Strength, Gorilla Biscuits, Bold, Judge, and Side By Side. However, many of these bands were more aggressive in their attitudes. Ray Cappo eventually converted to the Hare Krishna faith, and 108 and the Cro-Mags also participated in the Krishnacore offshoot. The California band Vegan Reich established the hardline wing of straight edge youth crew hardcore. Although hardline had few adherents, its attitudes and militancy had a notable effect on later bands such as Earth Crisis and Racetraitor. The "Youth Crew" scene also included the participation of skinheads, many of whom were fans of Warzone, Cro-Mags and Youth Defense League. Youth crew bands were contemporary to, though noticeably distinct from, crossover thrash, thrashcore, crust punk, melodic hardcore, and emo bands. The music of youth crew bands was originally intended to be a reaction against the metal-influenced hardcore that groups like Agnostic Front and the Cro-Mags made popular at the time, by using a sound that called back to earlier punk rock–leaning hardcore acts. However, later youth crew bands, namely Judge, began to take heavily from metal, helping to lead to the development of beatdown hardcore.

The end of the 1980s also saw the beginning of the Durham, England scene, one of the few youth crew scenes outside of the U.S. Heavily inspired by the sound of U.S. youth crew and straight edge bands, groups in the scene included Steadfast, False Face, No Way Out, Long Cold Stare, Know Your Enemy, The MacDonalds and Northern Wolfpack. Members of multiple of these bands would eventually form Voorhees.

The 1990s saw the emergence of groups inspired by this scene, as well as by thrash and death metal. These bands, including Earth Crisis, Snapcase, One Life Crew, Integrity, Strife, Hatebreed and Blood for Blood, recorded for Victory Records, and were partly responsible for the contemporary metalcore scene. Groups on Trustkill Records, such as Walls of Jericho, Racetraitor and Shai Hulud, were also part of this current. There were some bands, such as Mouthpiece, who were still keeping the original sound of youth crew.

As a reaction against the dominance of metal-influenced hardcore amongst straight edge bands, around 1996, a revival of the sound of the youth crew bands began. Bands including In My Eyes, Bane, Ten Yard Fight and Floorpunch, used the key aspects of late 1980s bands such as the gang vocals, high tempos and lyrical themes of straight edge, unity and vegetarianism. Additionally, at this time, Youth of Today's Ray Cappo formed Better Than a Thousand with Ken Olden and Graham Land of early 1990s straight edge band Battery, creating a sound, too, harkening back to this era.

By 1999 and 2000, the youth crew revival was in decline, with Ten Yard Fight, In My Eyes and Floorpunch all disbanding. As a reaction against the homogeneity and simplicity that scene had developed, Ten Yard Fight guitarist Tim Cossar and the band's roadie Wesley Eisold formed American Nightmare. Although still musically rooted in the youth crew revival, the band's negative, poetic lyrics of self-loathing were inspired by groups like the Smiths. American Nightmare's influence was apparent promptly in their home of Boston, then expanded nationally with the release of their 2001 debut album Background Music, being followed by a wave bands including Ceremony, Ruiner, Modern Life Is War, the Hope Conspiracy and Killing the Dream. A reaction against this movement also took place, which began with Mental, who were quickly followed by Have Heart. Have Heart's success led to the rise in popularity of other positive hardcore groups like Champion, Verse and Sinking Ships, and the rise in prominence of Bridge 9 Records.

In the mid-to late 2010s, there was an international youth crew revival. In the United States, these bands were largely drawing upon the influence of early 2000s melodic hardcore youth crew. Its proponents included One Step Closer, True Love, Chemical Fix, Mindset, If It Rains Unified Right, Fading Signal and Time and Pressure. In the United Kingdom, prominent players were Rapture, Shrapnel and Insist.

== Fashion ==
The youth crew fashion, different from the stereotypical skinhead fashion worn by many New York City-area hardcore music fans circa 1988, is preserved in record-liner photos, videos, and zine photos from that era. The look was more conventional than the usual punk fashion. In an interview in 2004's All Ages: Reflections on Straight Edge, Cappo described the youth crew look as "Tony Hawk meets Beaver Cleaver".

Youth crew fashion included bleached hair, crewcuts and similar haircuts, athletic wear, letterman jackets, sportswear, army pants or shorts, oversized T-shirts bearing band logos or straight edge slogans, hooded sweatshirts and hightop basketball shoes. 7 Seconds and their fans often drew black lines under their eyes in a similar manner to athletes. Hardliners and more militant straight-edgers sometimes wore camouflage and military surplus gear. The Swatch X-Rated became popular in youth crew fashion. Sports brands, such as Adidas, Nike or Champion, were popular in youth crew fashion.

The year 1988 is often considered the peak of youth crew straight edge New York hardcore, so the abbreviation '88 sometimes appears in songs, T-shirts, album cover art or other media. The year is also commonly remembered as a violent and dangerous one in the New York hardcore scene, when many clubs closed or banned hardcore concerts.

== Bibliography ==
- Andersen, Mark and Mark Jenkins (2003). Dance of Days: Two Decades of Punk in the Nation's Capital. Akashic Books. ISBN 1-888451-44-0
- Blush, Steven (2001). American Hardcore: A Tribal History. Los Angeles, CA: Feral House. ISBN 0-922915-71-7.
- Lahickey, Beth (1998). All Ages: Reflections on Straight Edge. Revelation Books. ISBN 1-889703-00-1
- O'Hara, Craig (1999). The Philosophy of Punk: More Than Noise. AK Press. ISBN 1-873176-16-3
