= In My Eyes (band) =

American hardcore punk band

- Origin: Boston, Massachusetts, U.S.
- Genres: Hardcore punk; melodic hardcore
- Years active: 1997–2000
- Past members: Sweet Pete; Damian Genuardi; Luke Garro; Neal St. Clair; Anthony Pappalardo

In My Eyes was an American, Boston-based, straight edge band which spearheaded the 1997 youth crew revival along with Follow Through, Ten Yard Fight, Bane, The Trust, Fastbreak and Floorpunch. The band and its members were a part of the hotbed that was the Boston music scene in the late 1990s and early 2000s. Members of the band also played in The Explosion, Fastbreak, and Panic. In My Eyes played their last show in October 2000, commemorating the second National Edge Day. The band was named after the Minor Threat song.

== Members ==
- Sweet Pete - Vocals
- Damian Genuardi - Bass
- Luke Garro - Drums
- Neal St. Clair - Guitar
- Anthony Pappalardo - Guitar
- Jeff Neuman - Guitar (for the Nothing to Hide LP only)

== Discography ==
=== Albums ===
- Demo - Big Wheel Recreation 1997
- The Difference Between - Revelation Records 1998
- Nothing to Hide - Revelation Records 2000
