= The World Is a Beautiful Place & I Am No Longer Afraid to Die =

American emo band

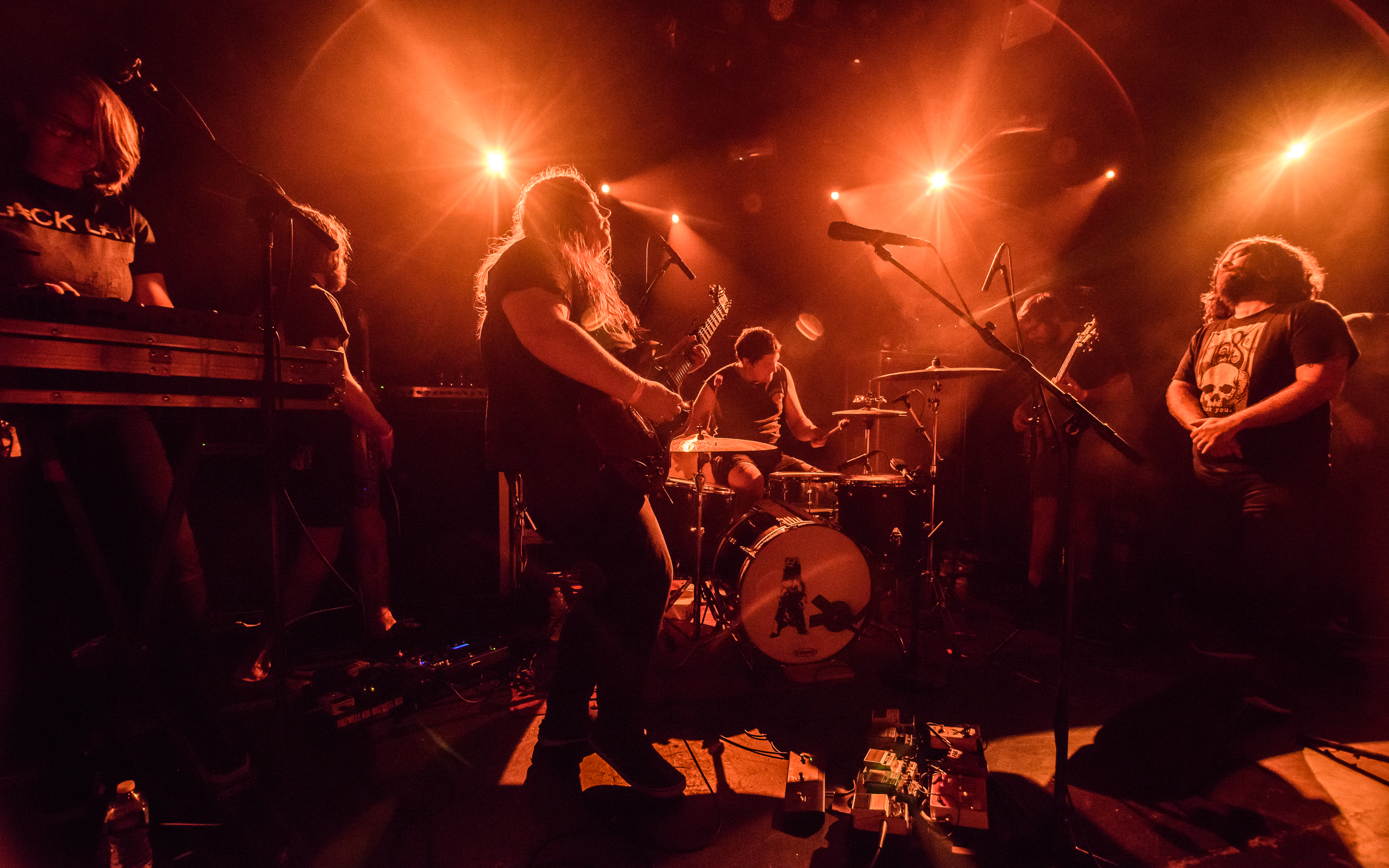
- The band performing at (Le) Poisson Rouge in New York in 2015

Background information
- Also known as: The World Is a Beautiful Place; The World Is; TWIABP
- Origin: Willimantic, Connecticut, U.S.
- Genres: Emo; post-hardcore; indie rock; post-rock
- Years active: 2009–present
- Labels: Epitaph; Topshelf; Black Lake; Ice Age; Skeletal Lightning
- Members: Josh Cyr; Steven Buttery; Chris Teti; David Bello; Katie Dvorak
- Past members: Nicole Shanholtzer; Thomas Diaz; Greg Horbal; Dylan Balliett; Bryan Casey; Devin Spector; Tyler Bussey; Julia Peters; Chris Zizzamia

The World Is a Beautiful Place & I Am No Longer Afraid to Die is an American rock band formed in Willimantic, Connecticut, in 2009. Following the release of several EPs and splits featuring original lead singer Thomas Diaz, they released their debut LP Whenever, If Ever in 2013 to generally positive reviews. Undergoing a series of roster changes, they proceeded to release a 2014 collaboration with spoken word artist Christopher Zizzamia titled Between Bodies, as well as several full-length records, including Harmlessness in 2015, Always Foreign in 2017, 2021's Illusory Walls, and Dreams of Being Dust in 2025.

== History ==
=== Early history and initial releases (2009–2012) ===
The band was formed in 2009 in Willimantic, Connecticut by Tyler Bussey, Nicole Shanholtzer, Thomas Diaz, and Josh Cyr, who remains the sole founding member. In the next two years, they released one demo; two extended plays, Formlessness (2010) with Devin Spector on guitar, and Josh is Dead (2011); a split with Deer Leap, Are Here To Help You (2011); and one single, "Gig Life" (2012). Although the band's early lineup changed multiple times, in 2012 they settled upon a core revolving around Nicole Shanholtzer, Josh Cyr, Steven Buttery, Chris Teti, David Bello, and Katie Dvorak, some of whom would play on their debut album, Whenever, If Ever, and subsequent follow ups.

=== Debut album and further EPs (2013–2014) ===
On June 18, 2013, through Topshelf Records, the band released their debut full-length LP, Whenever, If Ever, featuring Thomas Diaz's final contributions before departing the band due to medical issues. Upon release, it received generally positive reviews, and was considered a landmark album in the then infant emo revival movement. The album charted at No. 3 on the Billboard Vinyl charts, due to strong word-of-mouth as the band had virtually no press leading up to the release. In 2014, the band released two more extended plays, Between Bodies, and The Distance, as well as their first live album, recorded with Audiotree, Audiotree Live January 3, 2014.

=== Harmlessness (2015) ===
In August 2015, the band released "January 10, 2014", a single from their upcoming record, as well as an accompanying music video. One month later, in September, the band would release their sophomore record, Harmlessness, to critical acclaim. It subsequently charted at number 11 on the Heatseekers Albums chart, and at number 46 on the Independent Albums chart.

In November 2016, the band released a single "Body Without Organs", with proceeds going to the ACLU. Founding member Nicole Shanholtzer left the band in 2016.

=== Always Foreign and Illusory Walls (2017–present) ===
On August 1, 2017, the band announced their third album, Always Foreign, releasing a single "Dillon and Her Son" alongside it. David Bello said, concerning the writing and production of the record: "When we started writing we were fresh off Trump being elected, so there's an anger to the album that's different from what we've done in the past. There's a lot more resistance thinking throughout the songs – not in a way that's strictly anti-Trump, but also addressing things like white supremacy and controlling elements of the state." The album was released September 29, 2017, to positive reviews.

Dylan Balliett left the band in 2017.

Founding member Tom Diaz (born Thomas M. Diaz on September 2, 1986) died unexpectedly on November 1, 2018, at the age of 32. On November 3, 2018, the band confirmed his death on their social media accounts.

The band announced its next album, Illusory Walls, on August 3, 2021 and released it on October 8, 2021.

On August 22, 2025, the band released its fifth studio album, Dreams of Being Dust, on Epitaph Records.

== Musical style ==
The World Is a Beautiful Place & I Am No Longer Afraid to Die performs an experimental and atmospheric take on the emo genre. The band is described as one of the most important representatives of the newly emerging wave of emo of the 2010s. Under the Gun's Dan Bogosian argues that the band draws inspiration from '90s post-rock and first-generation emo. Slight influences from post-hardcore can also be found in some songs. The orchestral parts of some songs have drawn comparisons to Sigur Rós. Other influences include the post-rock bands Godspeed You! Black Emperor and Explosions in the Sky. They have also been called an indie rock band, with AllMusic describing them as "atmospheric emo/indie".

== Band members ==
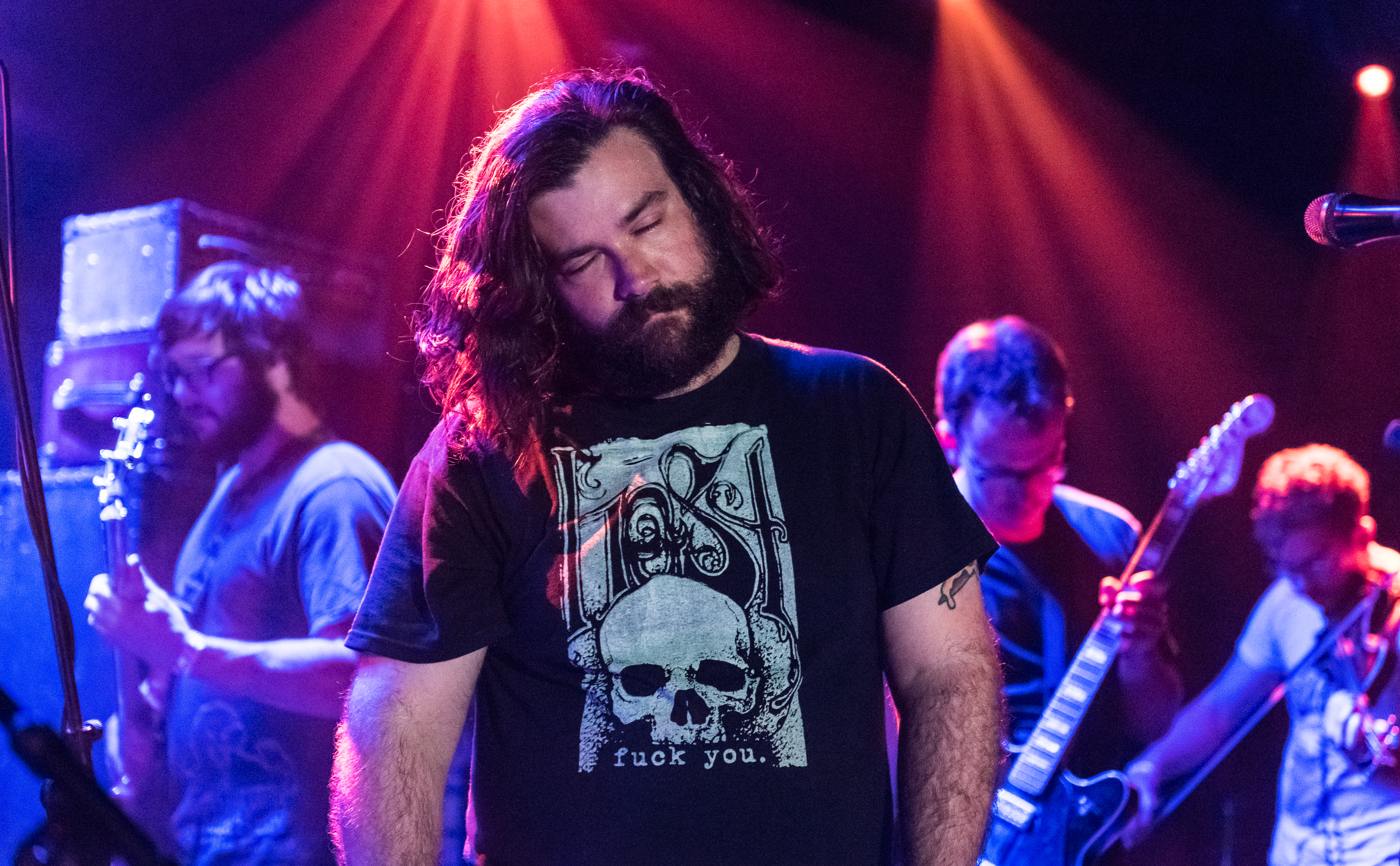
The band performing on August 22, 2015, at Greenwich Village

Current

- Josh Cyr – bass guitar, keyboards, vocals (2009–present)
- Steven Buttery – drums, percussion (2011–present)
- Chris Teti – guitar, trumpet (2011–present)
- David Bello – lead vocals (2012–present)
- Katie Dvorak – keyboards, vocals (2012–present)

Former

- Tyler Bussey – guitar, vocals (2009–2010, 2015–2018)
- Nicole Shanholtzer – drums (2009–2010), guitar, vocals (2010–2016)
- Thomas Diaz – keyboards, guitar, vocals (2009–2012; died 2018)
- Devin Spector – guitar (2009-2010)
- Brian Casey – drums (2010–2011)
- Greg Horbal – guitar, keyboards, vocals (2010–2015)
- Julia Peters – cello (2012–2014)
- Chris Zizzamia – spoken word (2014)
- Dylan Balliett – guitar, vocals (2015–2017)

== Discography ==
Studio albums

- Whenever, If Ever (2013, Topshelf)
- Harmlessness (2015, Epitaph)
- Always Foreign (2017, Epitaph)
- Illusory Walls (2021, Epitaph)
- Dreams of Being Dust (2025, Epitaph)

Extended plays

- Formlessness (2010, Topshelf)
- Josh Is Dead (2011, Topshelf/Ice Age)
- Between Bodies (2014, Broken World Media / Black Lake in the UK)
- The Distance (2014, Broken World Media)
- Death to New Years (2015, Topshelf)
- Long Live Happy Birthday (2016, Topshelf)
- Formlessness 2016 (2016, Topshelf)

Compilations

- Assorted Works (2019, Triple Crown)

Splits

- Are Here to Help You (Split LP with Deer Leap) (2011, Topshelf)
- Tigers Jaw/The World Is a Beautiful Place & I Am No Longer Afraid to Die/Code Orange Kids/Self Defense Family 4-Way Split 7" (2013, Topshelf)
- Sundae Bloody Sundae (split with Kittyhawk, Rozwell Kid, Two Knights) (2014, Skeletal Lightning)
- Fourteen Minute Mile (split with Rozwell Kid) (2015, Broken World Media)
- Sorority Noise/The World Is a Beautiful Place & I Am No Longer Afraid to Die (2016, Triple Crown)

Live albums

- Audiotree Live January 3, 2014 (2014, Audiotree Live)
- Live On KEXP (2016, KEXP)

Singles

- "Gig Life" (2012, Broken World Media)
- "January 10th, 2014" (2015, Broken World Media)
- "Mental Health" (2015, Broken World Media)
- "Body Without Organs" (2016)
- "Invading the World of the Guilty as a Spirit of Vengeance" (2021)
- "Queen Sophie for President" (2021)
- "Trouble" (2021)
- "Auguries of Guilt" (2024)
- "Beware the Centrist" (2025)

Appearances on compilation albums

- Mixed Signals Comp (2011, Run for Cover)

=== Music videos ===
Year	Song	Director
2013	"Picture of a Tree That Doesn't Look Okay"	Geoffrey Hoskinson
2013	"Low Light Assembly"	Alex Henery
2014	"Shoppers Beef"/"$100 Tip"	Geoffrey Hoskinson
2015	"January 10th, 2014"	Christopher Good
2017	"Marine Tigers"	Ryan Sheehy
2021	"Invading the World of the Guilty"	Adam Peditto
2021	"Queen Sophie for President"	Adam Peditto
