= List of New York hardcore bands =

This is a list of notable New York hardcore bands.

== Early bands (early to mid-1980s) ==
- Agnostic Front
- Adrenalin O.D. (this band is from New Jersey)
- Antidote
- Beastie Boys
- Carnivore
- Cro-Mags
- Crumbsuckers
- Damage
- Even Worse
- Heart Attack
- The Icemen
- Kraut
- Leeway
- Ludichrist
- The Mad
- Misfits (this band is from New Jersey)
- Murphy's Law
- Nausea
- Reagan Youth
- Sheer Terror
- Sick of It All
- Six and Violence
- The Stimulators (not hc, but important transitional band from the old scene.)
- Stormtroopers of Death (S.O.D.)
- Straight Ahead
- The Undead
- Urban Waste
- Vatican Commandos (This band is from Connecticut)
- Warzone
- The Young and the Useless

== Late-1980s to early-1990s bands ==
- Biohazard
- Bold (aka Crippled Youth)
- Born Against
- Breakdown
- Burn
- Candiria
- The Casualties
- Choking Victim
- Earth Crisis
- Gorilla Biscuits
- Helmet
- Into Another
- Judge
- Killing Time
- Life of Agony
- Life's Blood
- Madball
- Merauder
- Method of Destruction (M.O.D.)
- Orange 9mm
- Pro-Pain
- Project X
- Quicksand
- Shelter
- Subzero
- Unsane

== Mid-1990s to 2000s bands ==
- 25 ta Life
- 108
- All Out War
- The Austerity Program
- Awkward Thought
- Battle of Mice
- Bulldoze
- Castevet
- Cerebral Ballzy
- CIV
- Crown of Thornz
- Full Blown Chaos
- Gay for Johnny Depp
- H_{2}O
- Indecision
- Jets to Brazil
- Leftöver Crack
- Morning Glory
- Most Precious Blood
- No Redeeming Social Value
- On The Rise
- Off Minor
- Rival Schools
- Saetia
- Skarhead
- Star Fucking Hipsters
- Sworn Enemy
- Tragic Figure
- Tripface
- District 9
- Sons of Abraham
- United Nations

== Long Island bands ==
- Backtrack
- Crime in Stereo
- Glassjaw
- Half-Man
- Incendiary
- Invade
- Kill Your Idols
- Neglect
- On The Rise
- 1.6 Band
- Putdown
- Scapegrace
- Skycamefalling
- Stray from the Path
- This Is Hell
- Tripface
- Vision of Disorder

== See also ==
- List of hardcore punk bands
- New York Thrash Compilation documenting the earliest NYHC scene.
