= List of hardcore punk bands =

This is a list of notable hardcore punk bands. Hardcore punk (commonly shortened to hardcore) is an underground music genre that generally revolves around a thicker and more aggressive tone than earlier punk rock.

== # ==
- 10 Minute Warning
- 108
- 100 Demons
- 25 ta Life
- 50 Lions
- 7 Seconds
- 88 Fingers Louie

== A ==
- AC4
- The Accüsed
- Adolescents
- Adrenalin O.D.
- AFI
- Against
- Agent Orange
- Agnostic Front
- All Out War
- American Nightmare
- American Standards
- Angry Samoans
- Angst
- Anti Cimex
- Anti-Everything
- Anti Feminism
- Anti-Flag
- Anti-Nowhere League
- Anti-Pasti
- Antidote
- Antisect
- Armia
- Arms Race
- Arson Anthem
- Articles of Faith
- Assjack
- Attitude Adjustment
- Avail
- Awkward Thought

== B ==
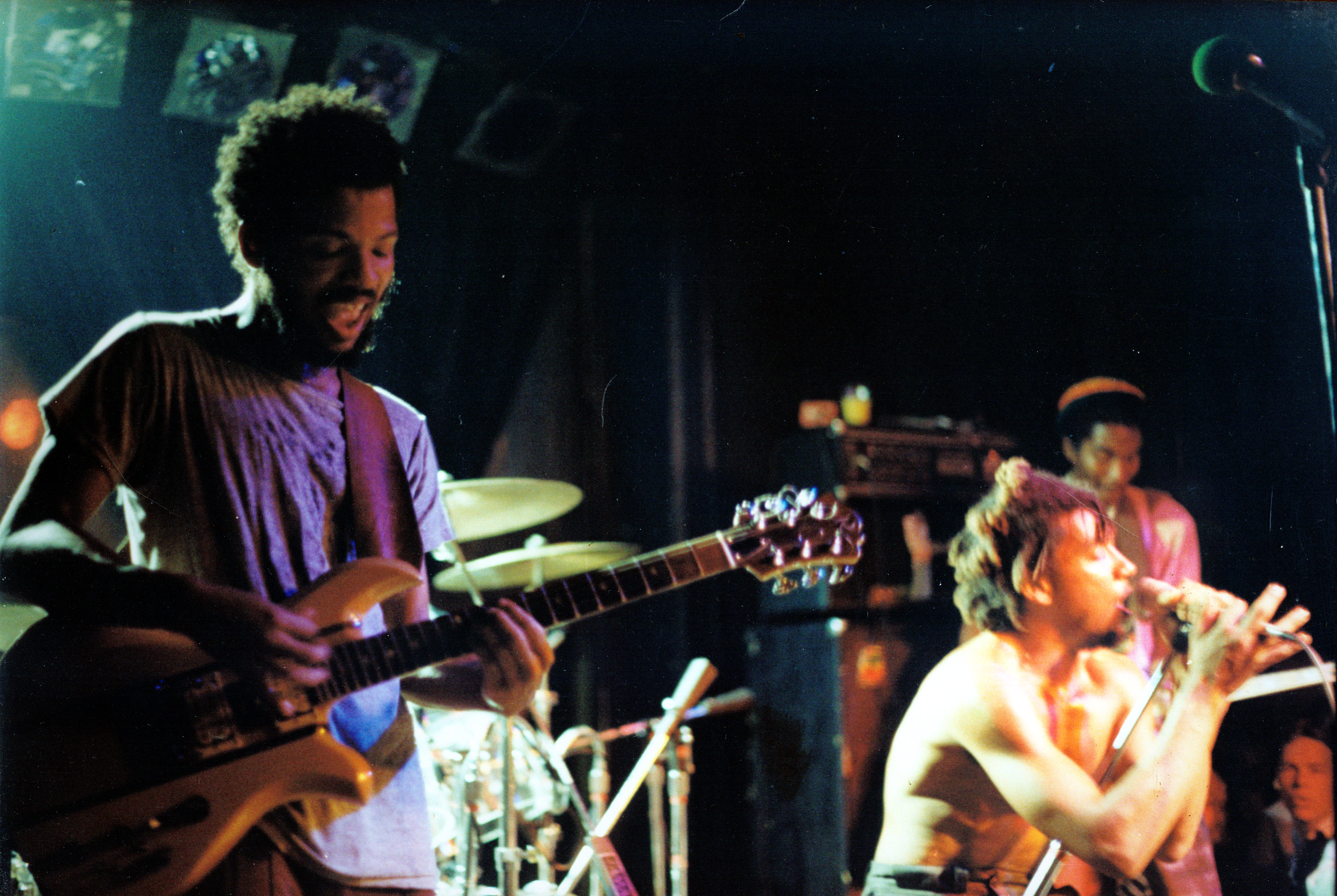
Bad Brains at 9:30 Club, Washington, D.C., 1983

- Backstabbers Incorporated
- Bad Brains
- Bad Religion
- Bags
- Bane
- Battalion of Saints
- Battery
- Bayonet
- Beastie Boys (early)
- Being as an Ocean
- Big Boys
- Big Cheese
- Black Flag
- Black Market Baby
- Blast
- Break Even
- The Blood
- Blood for Blood
- Bomb Factory
- Born Against
- Born from Pain
- Botch
- The Brat
- Brick By Brick
- Broken Bones
- Broken Teeth
- The Bronx
- Brutal Knights
- Bulldoze
- Bullet Treatment
- Bunchofuckingoofs
- Burn
- Burning Sensations

== C ==
- Cancer Bats
- Capsize
- Career Suicide
- Carpathian
- Casey Jones
- The Casualties
- Cerebral Ballzy
- Chain of Strength
- Champion
- Chaos UK
- Channel 3
- The Chats
- The Chisel
- Chokehold
- Choking Victim
- Christ on Parade
- Circle Jerks
- CIV
- Clit 45
- Clutch (early)
- Close Your Eyes
- Corrosion of Conformity (early)
- Code Orange
- Cold as Life
- Cólera
- Comeback Kid
- Consumed
- Converge
- Counterparts
- Cripple Bastards
- Cro-Mags
- Crumbsuckers
- Cryptic Slaughter
- Crucifix
- Los Crudos
- Cruel Hand

== D ==
- D.I.
- D.O.A.
- Drain
- D.R.I.
- Dag Nasty
- Damage
- Dayglo Abortions
- Dead Kennedys
- Dead Swans
- Deathkiller
- Death Before Dishonor
- Death Piggy
- Death Ray Vision
- Deep Wound
- Defeater
- Descendents
- Die Kreuzen
- Discharge
- Disembodied
- Down to Nothing
- Dr. Know
- Dropdead
- The Dicks
- DYS

== E ==
- E.Town Concrete
- Earth Crisis
- Econochrist
- electric eels
- Endpoint
- Endwell
- Energy
- English Dogs
- Evergreen Terrace
- Excel
- The Exploited
- Expire

== F ==
- F-Minus
- The F.U.'s
- Faith
- Fang
- Farewell to Freeway
- The Fartz
- Fear
- The Feederz
- Fever 333
- Final Conflict
- Flipper
- FOD
- The Flex
- For Against
- Fortunate Son
- The Freeze
- Fucked Up
- Full of Hell

== G ==
- Gang Green
- GBH
- The Geeks
- Gel
- Germs
- GISM
- A Global Threat
- G.L.O.S.S.
- God Complex
- Good Riddance
- Gorilla Biscuits
- Government Issue
- Green Arrows
- Good Clean Fun
- Gulch

== H ==
- H_{2}O
- Hatebreed
- Have Heart
- Heart Attack
- Heart in Hand
- Heresy
- Higher Power
- High Vis
- Hogan's Heroes
- Hoods
- Hundredth
- Hüsker Dü

== I ==
- I.R.A.
- The Icemen
- Icepick
- The Idoru
- Ignite
- Ill Repute
- Incendiary
- Infest
- In My Eyes
- Inside Out
- Integrity
- International Superheroes of Hardcore
- Iron Cross
- Iron Mind
- I-Spy

== J ==
- Jawbreaker
- Jello Biafra and the Guantanamo School of Medicine
- Jerry's Kids
- JFA
- John Coffey
- Judge
- Judiciary

== K ==
- Kid Dynamite
- Kill Your Idols
- Killing the Dream
- Killing Time
- The Killing Tree
- King Parrot
- Knuckledust
- Knocked Loose
- Kraut
- Kublai Khan

== L ==
- Lard
- Lay It on the Line
- Leathermouth
- Leftöver Crack
- Life's Blood
- Limp Wrist
- Litmus Green
- The Locust

== M ==
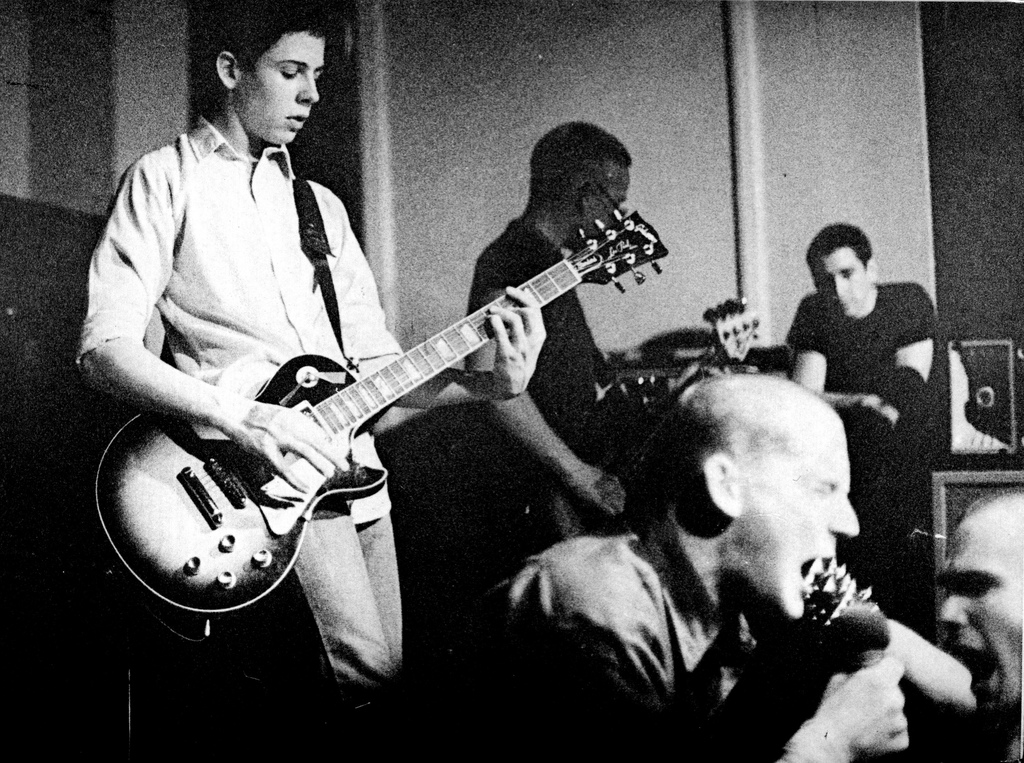
Minor Threat performing in 1981

- M.O.D.
- Madball
- Malevolence
- Man Is the Bastard
- Marginal Man
- MDC
- The Meatmen
- Meat Puppets (early)
- Melvins (early)
- Middle Class
- Miles Away
- Mindsnare
- Minor Threat
- Minutemen
- Misfits
- The Mob
- Mob 47
- Modern Life Is War
- Moshiach Oi!
- Mouthpiece
- Murphy's Law
- The Murder Junkies

== N ==
- Nails
- Napalm Death (early)
- Necros
- Negative Approach
- Negative FX
- Negazione
- The Nerve Agents
- Neurosis (early)
- Newborn
- New Regime
- The Nip Drivers
- No Bragging Rights
- No Innocent Victim
- No Redeeming Social Value
- No Trigger
- NOFX (early)
- No Means No

== O ==
- Off!
- One King Down
- Operation Ivy
- Outbreak
- One Step Closer

== P ==
- Painstream
- Paint It Black
- Parasites
- Pest Control
- Phinius Gage
- Point of No Return
- Poison Idea
- Pro-Pain
- Project X
- The Proletariat
- Punch
- Propagandhi

== R ==
- Rambo
- Raised Fist
- Ratos de Porão
- Rattus
- Raw Power
- Reagan Youth
- Really Red
- Redd Kross
- Refused
- Rotting Out
- The Replacements (early)
- Repulsion
- Revenge of the Psychotronic Man
- Rich Kids on LSD
- Ringworm
- Rise Against (early)
- Rites of Spring
- Rorschach
- Rudimentary Peni
- Ruiner
- Rupture

== S ==
- S.O.A.
- S.O.D.
- Scream
- Septic Death
- Septic Tank
- Shai Hulud
- Sharptooth
- Sheer Terror
- Shelter
- Show Me the Body
- Sick of It All
- Siege
- Skarhead
- Slant
- Slapshot
- Snapcase
- SNFU
- Snot
- Speed (Australian band)
- SSD
- The Stalin
- Stick to Your Guns
- Straight Faced
- Stray from the Path
- Stretch Arm Strong
- Strike Anywhere
- Strongarm
- The Stupids
- Subhumans (British band)
- Subhumans (Canadian band)
- Subzero
- Suicidal Tendencies
- The Suicide File
- The Suicide Machines
- Sunami
- Superjoint Ritual
- Sworn Enemy

== T ==
- T.S.O.L.
- Tales of Terror
- Ten Yard Fight
- Terror
- Terveet Kädet
- The Ejected
- The Teen Idles
- This Is Hell
- Thrice (early)
- Throwdown (early)
- Thrown (band)
- To the Wind
- Toe to Toe
- Toxic Reasons
- Tragedy
- Trapped Under Ice
- Trash Talk
- Trial
- Turnstile

== U ==
- Ulrikes Dream
- Ultimatum
- Undertow
- The Undead
- Uniform Choice
- The Unseen
- Unseen Terror
- Up Front
- Urban Waste

== V ==
- Vatican Commandos
- Vegan Reich
- Vein.fm
- Venomous Concept
- Verbal Abuse
- Verse
- Violent Reaction
- Vision of Disorder
- Vitamin X
- Void
- Vorvaň

== W ==
- The Warriors
- Warzone
- Wasted Youth
- Waterdown
- Western Addiction
- Where's the Pope?
- White Flag
- A Wilhelm Scream
- Wormrot
- Wrangler Brutes
- The White Noise

== X ==
- X-Cops
- XTRMST

== Y ==
- Youth Brigade
- Youth Defense League
- Youth of Today
- Yellowcard (early)

== Z ==
- Zeke
- Zero Boys
- Zulu

== See also ==
- List of beatdown hardcore bands
- List of Christian hardcore bands
- List of crossover thrash bands
- List of crunkcore artists
- List of crust punk bands
- List of deathcore artists
- List of melodic hardcore bands
- List of New York hardcore bands
- List of Nintendocore bands
- List of Oi! bands
- List of post-hardcore bands
- List of screamo bands
- List of street punk bands
- List of thrashcore bands
