= Hardcore 4 The Coldhearted =

Compilation album by Danny Diablo
- Released: August 29, 2008
- Genre: NYHC; hardcore rap; hardcore punk; underground hip hop
- Length: 79:07 + 58:46
- Label: Countdown Records
- Producer: Lord Ezec

Danny Diablo chronology
Thugcore 4 Life (2007)	Hardcore 4 The Coldhearted (2008)	Danny Diablo Vs. The Vendetta (2008)

Hardcore 4 The Coldhearted is the double CD album by American hardcore punk and hip hop artist Danny Diablo. It was released on August 29, 2008, via Countdown Records.

The record consists of a compilation album disc (also known as the Street C.D. Volume #3) and an official mixtape (originally released as El Diablo's Most Sinister) featuring Lord Ezec's project acts such as Crown Of Thornz, Skarhead, ShotBlockers, Icepick, with guest appearances by the likes of fellow bands and artists such as La Coka Nostra, Transplants, Madball, Hatebreed, SubZero among others.

== Track listing ==
=== Disc 1: The Best Of Danny Diablo ===
1. "Princess Mischevious (Phone Message)"
2. "No Remorse" by Crown of Thornz
3. "Peter Greene (Phone Message)"
4. "Dogz Of War" by Skarhead
5. "Estevan Oriol (Phone Message)"
6. "Head Check" by Crown of Thornz
7. "Creations Of Chaos" by Icepick
8. "I Won't Change" by Skarhead, Roger Miret, Freddy Madball
9. "Lash One (Phone Message)"
10. "Love Sick" by Crown of Thornz
11. "King At Crime" by Skarhead and Lou Dibella of SubZero
12. "Home Of The Sleaze" by Skarhead and Deep Down
13. "The Juggernaut" by Crown of Thornz
14. "Puerto Rican Myke (Phone Message)"
15. "Loyal To The Grave" feat. Rick Ta Life and Freddy Madball
16. "Johnny Boy (Phone Message)"
17. "Devotion Measures Strength" by Icepick
18. "Hardcore" by Skarhead and Deep Down
19. "Kevin Bulldoze (Phone Message)"
20. "The Big Payback" by Skarhead, Lou Dibella of SubZero and Jorge Rosado of Merauder
21. "Game Over" by Skarhead, Deep Down and Jimmy Williams of Maximum Penalty
22. "Big Vinny (Phone Message)"
23. "Tomorrow Is Never Promised" by Icepick
24. "Steve Poss (Phone Message)"
25. "Rebirth" by Crown of Thornz
26. "Bitter Twisted Memory" by Icepick
27. "Vinny Stigma (Phone Message)"
28. "Skarhead" by Skarhead and Freddy Madball
29. "T.C.O.B." by Skarhead, John Joseph and Craig Setari
30. "Jamey Jasta (Phone Message)"
31. "Real Recognizes Real" by Icepick, Ice-T, Roger Miret, Paul Bearer, Freddy Madball, All Barr, Pete Morcey
32. "Y.A.S." by Skarhead and Rick Ta Life
33. "Sean B. (Phone Message)"
34. "We Don't Care by Danny Diablo
35. "Icepick" by Crown of Thornz
36. "Jorge Merauder (Phone Message)"
37. "The Harsh Truth" by Danny Diablo (Originally recorded by The Icemen)

=== Disc 2: El Diablo's Mixtape ===
1. "Intro"
2. "DJ Spae's "Living By The Gun" Remix"
3. "Bloodshed Part 2 (feat. Danny Boy, Big Left, CeeKay and Shotblockers)
4. "PSK Remix" (feat. Puerto Rican Myke and Lordz Of Brooklyn)
5. "Unstoppable"
6. "DJ Spae's "Rise Above" Remix" (feat. Everlast and Ill Bill)
7. "D.R.E.A.M" (feat. Skinhead Rob)
8. "4 Shots" (feat. Slaine)
9. "Snickers"
10. "DJ Spae's "Get Down" Remix"
11. "You Know What I'm Talkin' Bout Man?" (feat. Mr. Hyde and Prince Power Rule)
12. "Watch Ur Back" (feat. Necro)
13. "Back On Up" (feat. Puerto Rican Myke, Danny Boy and Slaine)
14. "DJ Spae's "Kill Em Dead" Remix"
15. "DJ Spae's "Who Is The Man" Remix" (feat. House Of Pain)
16. "Satanic Shamrocks" (feat. Slaine, Big Left, Danny Boy, Skinhead Rob)
17. "Banged Out"
18. "Bonus Track: The Vendetta - The Mechanix Remix" (feat. Prince Metropolitan, Skinhead Rob and Necro)
