= N.Y.H.C. (film) =

1999 American documentary film

- Directed by: Frank Pavich
- Produced by: Frank Pavich; Stephen Scarlata; Anthony Edwards (EP); Dante Di Loreto (EP)
- Starring: Madball; 25 ta Life; Vision of Disorder; Crown of Thornz; 108; No Redeeming Social Value; District 9
- Cinematography: Henryk Tzvi Cymerman
- Edited by: Jason Airey; Frank Pavich
- Distributed by: HALO 8 Entertainment
- Release date: 1999
- Running time: 87 minutes
- Country: United States
- Language: English

N.Y.H.C. is a documentary film directed by Frank Pavich about the mid-1990s New York hardcore scene. Filmed in mid-1995, it was completed and self-released on VHS by Pavich in 1999.

The documentary was acquired for distribution by HALO 8 Entertainment in December 2007. On March 25, 2008, Halo-8 released a two-disc special edition for the documentary's first time on DVD. Disc 2 features previously unreleased footage including "Where Are They Now?" interviews shot ten years after the original documentary, live performances of complete songs by Vision of Disorder, Madball, 25 ta Life, 108, No Redeeming Social Value, District 9, and more, as well as new interviews with Lou Koller (Sick of It All) and Toby Morse (H_{2}O).

== Plot ==
One of the few documentaries focusing on the hardcore music scene of one city, N.Y.H.C. featured seven bands prominent in the mid-90s scene. A diverse grouping was selected, from Long Island suburbanites to Bronx inner-city youth to Hare Krishna devotees.

== Live performances ==
The featured bands are:

- Madball
- 25 ta Life
- Vision of Disorder
- Crown of Thornz
- 108
- No Redeeming Social Value
- District 9

== Interviewees ==
Interviewees include:

- Freddy Madball (Madball)
- Rick ta Life (25 ta Life)
- Roger Miret (Agnostic Front)
- John Joseph (Cro-Mags)
- Lord Ezec (Crown of Thornz)
- Mike Dijan (Crown of Thornz)
- Kevin Gill (SFT Records)
- Barbara Kenngott (SFT Records)
- Vic DiCara (108)
- Rasaraja dasa aka Rob Fish (108)
- Trivikrama dasa (108)
- Jimmy Gestapo (Murphy's Law)
- Tommy Rat (Rejuvenate)
- Dean Miller (No Redeeming Social Value)
- Vinnie Value (No Redeeming Social Value)
- K love the Sonic Maximizer (No Redeeming Social Value)
- Mike Dixon (No Redeeming Social Value)
- Chris Wynne (In Effect Magazine)
- Tim Williams (VOD)
- Mike Kennedy (VOD)
- Mike Fleischmann (VOD)
- Brendan Cohen (VOD)
- Matt Baumbach (VOD)
- Myke Rivera (District 9)
- Cesar Ramirez (District 9)
- Todd Hamilton (District 9)
- Loki Velasquez (District 9)

Notable in this film is interview footage of Roger Miret while using a wheelchair due to a vertebrae injury sustained at a show.

== Film festivals ==
- Chicago Underground Film Festival - 1999
- Euro Underground Film Festival - 1999
- Hot Springs Documentary Film Festival - 2000
- New York Underground Film Festival - 2000
- Sound Unseen Film & Music Festival - 2000
- Mostra Internacional de Cinema (Brazil) - 2001

== Soundtrack ==
The N.Y.H.C. Documentary Soundtrack was released in 1996 prior to the film’s release by SFT Records on compact disc. It was intended to help raise funds for the completion of the documentary itself (which was finally completed & released in 1999). This CD featured live tracks as well as interview clips. The featured bands are Madball, 25 ta Life, Vision of Disorder, 108, Crown of Thornz, No Redeeming Social Value, and District 9.

N.Y.H.C. Documentary Soundtrack

Soundtrack album
- Released: 1996
- Recorded: 1995
- Genre: Hardcore punk
- Length: 73 minutes
- Label: S.F.T Records
- Producer: Velebit Productions

All tracks were recorded live in mid-1995.

=== Track listing ===
1. Crown of Thornz – "Juggernaut"
2. 25 ta Life – "Da Lowdown"
3. Kevin Gill of SFT Records (interview dialogue)
4. Vision of Disorder – "Suffer"
5. Virginia (interview dialogue)
6. District 9 – "Fool"
7. Freddy Madball (interview dialogue)
8. Madball – "New York City"
9. Rasaraja dasa of 108 (interview dialogue)
10. 108 – "Solitary"
11. Vinnie & Dean of NRSV (interview dialogue)
12. No Redeeming Social Value – "New 64"
13. Myke & Todd of District 9 (interview dialogue)
14. District 9 – "Victim"
15. Rick ta Life (interview dialogue)
16. 25 ta Life – "Separate Ways"
17. John Joseph of the Cro-Mags (interview dialogue)
18. 108 – "Holyname"
19. Tim & Brendan of Vision of Disorder (interview dialogue)
20. Vision of Disorder – "Formula for Failure"
21. Roger Miret of Agnostic Front (interview dialogue)
22. Madball – "It's Time"
23. Madball – "Crucified" (with Roger Miret on vocals)
24. Dean & Vinnie of NRSV with Chris of In Effect Magazine (interview dialogue)
25. No Redeeming Social Value – "No Regrets"
26. Tim Williams, Matt Baumbach, Mike Kennedy & Mike Fleischmann of Vision of Disorder (interview dialogue)
27. Vision of Disorder – "D.T.O."
28. Ezec of Crown of Thornz (interview dialogue)
29. Crown of Thornz – "Crown of Thornz"

== Home media ==
The film was released on DVD on March 25, 2008.
