= For the Bleeders =

Studio album by Vision of Disorder
- Released: August 24, 1999
- Recorded: 1998–1999
- Genre: Metalcore; groove metal; alternative metal
- Length: 30:28
- Label: Go-Kart
- Producer: Tim Gilles

Vision of Disorder chronology
Imprint (1998)	For the Bleeders (1999)	From Bliss to Devastation (2001)

Professional ratings
Review scores
Source	Rating
AllMusic	3/5 stars

For the Bleeders is an album by American metalcore band Vision of Disorder. Released on August 24, 1999, this is the band's only release on Go-Kart Records. It contains a collection of re-recorded songs from their 1990s demos and their 1995 EP Still, along with three new originals; "Adelaide", the title track, and "In the Room".

== Track listing ==
1. "Choke" - 2:29
2. "Adelaide" - 2:58
3. "Watch Out" - 2:14
4. "7/13" - 3:16
5. "For the Bleeders" - 2:41
6. "No Regret" - 2:05
7. "Formula for Failure" - 4:15
8. "Beneath the Green" - 4:08
9. "Take Them Out" - 3:20
10. "In the Room" - 3:03

== Credits ==
- Tim Williams – lead vocals
- Mike Kennedy – guitar
- Matt Baumbach – guitar
- Mike Fleischmann – bass
- Brendon Cohen – drums

Production

- Tim Gilles – producer, mixing, mastering
- Greg Gordon – engineering
- Mike Ward – engineering
- Yuki Koroyanagi – photography
