= Vision of Disorder (album) =

Studio album by Vision of Disorder
- Released: October 22, 1996
- Recorded: June 4 – August 7, 1996
- Studio: B.K. (Saugus) (Note: Vocals); Brown Sound (Gloucester) (Note: Overdubs); Outpost (Stoughton) (Note: Basic tracks)
- Genre: Metalcore; heavy hardcore; hardcore punk
- Length: 39:04
- Label: Supersoul; Roadrunner
- Producer: Jamie Locke

Vision of Disorder chronology
Still (1995)	Vision of Disorder (1996)	Imprint (1998)

Vision of Disorder is the debut studio album by the American metalcore band Vision of Disorder, released on October 22, 1996, through the Roadrunner Records imprint label Supersoul Recordings. The band recorded the album with producer Jamie Locke at various Massachusetts studios between June and August 1996. Vision of Disorder is a metalcore album that combines hardcore and metal influences and features socially conscious lyrics.

Vision of Disorder was well received by critics and went on to sell more than 100,000 copies by 2001, although Vision of Disorder have been critical of it since its release, citing its production and their performances. The band promoted the album through tours with Orange 9MM, Earth Crisis, Madball and Sick of It All, before performing on the inaugural Ozzfest tour in 1997.

== Background and recording ==
Vision of Disorder were formed in 1992. By 1995, the band's lineup consisted of vocalist Tim Williams, guitarists Matt Baumbach and Mike Kennedy, bassist Mike Fleischmann and drummer Brendon Cohen. That year, Vision of Disorder released its debut extended play (EP), Still, and were featured on the New York's Hardest compilation album. After playing a show with Shelter in Pennsylvania, Ray Cappo offered to sign Vision of Disorder as the first band on his new imprint label on Roadrunner Records, Supersoul, whom they would sign a five-album contract with. Vision of Disorder were given the choice to either record their debut album at Legend Studios in Long Island, where they had recorded demos of "Element" and "Ways to Destroy One's Ambition" with producer Bob V., or work with producer Jamie Locke. Fleischmann said the band rejected the former suggestion at the time as "insane", though later believed the album's production would have been better and more relaxed had they done so. The band went with Locke based on his work with Madball, after which they recorded Vision of Disorder at three different studios in Massachusetts between June 4 and August 7, 1996. The band recorded basic tracks at the Outpost in Stoughton, overdubs at Brown Sound in Gloucester, and vocals at B.K. Studios—owned by guitarist Bobby Keyes—in Saugus. The album was then mixed at Blue Jay Recording Studios in Carlisle.

As [the recording of Vision of Disorder went] on we knew it wasn't coming out good. ... We were in the studio and everyone at the same time just clashed. To be honest any of us could have walked out of the studio, we all wanted to, but it just happened to be [Fleischmann] ... he had the balls to do it.

—Matt Baumbach

The recording of Vision of Disorder was marred by various difficulties. The band did not get on with Locke, and lacked enough money for food; their car also broke down. The band ordered new amplifiers prior to recording, which did not arrive on time, delaying the recording of guitars by three days. Williams had problems getting himself in the right headspace to record vocals, and had trouble trying to sing over the new equipment. As he began redoing his parts, Williams was forced to leave the Boston area to get his wisdom teeth removed, which he spent a week recovering from. As Vision of Disorder had overrun their time at Brown Sound, he redid his vocal tracks at B.K. According to A&R rep Howie Abrams, Williams struggled to use a studio microphone and ultimately recorded his parts with a handheld microphone. Following its recording, Fleischmann left Vision of Disorder due to personal differences and returned to school. Baumbach attributed his departure to tensions stemming from their unhappiness with the album's production. Williams later said that Fleischmann's departure cast "a huge dark cloud over [the band]. It was like a complete darkness, everything went down."

== Composition and lyrics ==
Vision of Disorder is a metalcore, heavy hardcore, and hardcore punk album that combines hardcore and metal influences. The band's members described their sound as "heavy", with Kennedy stating that they considered it hardcore-influenced metal. Adrian Bromley of Chronicles of Chaos described the album as combining hardcore with death metal, whilst Finn McKenty of MetalSucks considered it a blend of nu metal with "Victory-style hardcore". Baumbach said that its biggest musical influence was Korn's self-titled debut album (1994), which he felt came through in "Zone Zero" and "Through My Eyes". Williams uses sung and screamed vocals and was compared to Pantera vocalist Phil Anselmo. Steve Huey of AllMusic called Williams' lyrics socially conscious, with Bromley likewise stating they comment on life and society. Dean Golemis of the Chicago Tribune described it as "full of rage, protest and introspection".

According to Williams, the album's lyrics are about energy and "venting frustrations about what people collectively choose to believe, government, day to day things, everything from bliss to devastation". In an interview with LiveWire, he cited The Doors, Henry Rollins, Jane's Addiction and Madball alongside his own essays and poetry as influences on the album's lyrics. Although he usually had them prepared beforehand, he improvised many lyrics in the studio due to the stress of recording. He wanted the lyrics to "stimulate thought", but not tell people how to be or what to do. "Element" is about "getting what you want through dedication". "Through My Eyes" criticizes humanity's dependence on computers. "Viola" was inspired by serial killer Henry Lee Lucas, whilst "Ways to Destroy One's Ambition" was inspired by the Bosnian genocide and addresses the descruction of knowledge. "Suffer" is about the hostility faced by Generation X from older generations. "Excess" is about drug abuse.

== Release and promotion ==
Vision of Disorder was released through Supersoul/Roadrunner Records on October 22, 1996. Williams said that the album's cover art was meant to "[represent] a toxic vibe [...] something nuclear." Vision of Disorder initially toured with Madball using a fill-in bassist, whom Williams considered good but a poor fit for the band. The band met Fleischmann and reconciled their differences thereafter, though had to wait for him to drop out of school before he could rejoin. Vision of Disorder attempted a tour with Godflesh with a bassist called Jake, who Williams called "horrendous"; they ultimately dropped off the tour after playing only six dates. By November 1996, Fleischmann had rejoined the band.

From December 12–29, 1996, Vision of Disorder toured with Orange 9MM and Madball. Between January and February 1997, the band toured the east coast of the United States with Earth Crisis. The band dropped out of a planned west coast tour with Earth Crisis and Downset in favour of supporting Sick of It All in Europe, in April 1997. In May and June 1997, Vision of Disorder performed on the second stage of the inaugural Ozzfest tour with Coal Chamber, Downset, Drain STH, Kyuss, Neurosis and Slo Burn. The band were almost dropped from Ozzfest twice due to communication issues and lateness, with Williams attributing the latter to problems with their RV and driver. Roadrunner eventually got the band a tour bus halfway through the tour. Thereafter, the band former their own headlining tour with Bloodlet, Day in the Life, One King Down and Fahrenheit 451 and toured Japan for the first time.

== Reception ==
Professional ratings
Review scores
Source	Rating
AllMusic	2.5/5 stars
Chicago Tribune	3/4 stars
Chronicles of Chaos	9/10
Collector's Guide to Heavy Metal	7/10
Hit Parader	4/5 stars
In Music We Trust	4/5 stars
Rock Hard	7.5/10

Vision of Disorder was well received by critics. Bromley of Chronicles of Chaos called Vision of Disorder a "loud and truly stunning debut" album, praising Vision of Disorder's "ability [...] to channel emotions into one powerful punch" and Williams' lyrics. Hit Parader likewise highlighted the control the band displayed over their "full throttle power" and meaningful yet intense lyrics. Martin Popoff said the album was "quite good" and highlighted its production and muscular, groove-laden riffs. Todd Follett of In Music We Trust considered it repetitive but not bland on account of its songwriting, whilst Huey of AllMusic highlighted its variety but found Williams' lyrics and performances limited and overworked. Golemis of the Chicago Tribune felt that whilst some of the album's songs "simply toot the hackneyed horn of 'life sucks' ", it ultimately did not matter in the "hardcore arena" and considered it a "promising debut".

As of August 2001, more than 100,000 copies of Vision of Disorder have been sold. According to Greg Prato of AllMusic, the album is considered Vision of Disorder's best by fans, with "Element," "Through My Eyes" and "D.T.O." becoming "early favorites". In 2016, Justin Krieger of New Noise Magazine described it as a "cult classic" and viewed its style as influential on metalcore. Eighteen Visions covered "D.T.O." on their eight album 1996 (2021), and Hatebreed paid tribute to the album through one of their t-shirts released in 2024.

Vision of Disorder have criticized the album since its release; according to Lorne Behrman of CMJ New Music Monthly, the band "dismissed [it] almost as soon as it came out". In a 1998 interview with Terrorizer, Baumbach referred to it as a "bad, processed record". In an interview Killjoy Circus that year, Williams also said: "We hate it. The material is there. The performance is horrible, and the production is even worse."

== Track listing ==
All tracks are written by Vision of Disorder.

No.	Title	Length
1.	"Element"	3:12
2.	"Watering Disease"	2:34
3.	"Through My Eyes"	3:38
4.	"Viola"	4:18
5.	"Liberation"	3:36
6.	"Divide"	1:50
7.	"Ways to Destroy One's Ambition"	2:52
8.	"Suffer"	2:55
9.	"Zone Zero"	3:58
10.	"D.T.O."	4:04
11.	"Excess"	3:10
12.	"Gloom"	2:57
Total length:		39:12

== Personnel ==
Adapted from liner notes.

Vision of Disorder
- Tim Williams - vocals
- Mike Kennedy - guitar
- Matt Baumbach - guitar
- Brendon Cohen - drums

Additional personnel

- Mike Fleischmann - bass (Note: Fleischmann was not a member of Vision of Disorder at the time of the album's release, though he rejoined the band shortly thereafter.)
Production
- Jamie Locke - producer, engineering, mixing
- Chris Gehringer - mastering
- Neal Ward - assistant engineering
- Andy Hollinger - assistant engineering
- Joel Sio Lima - assistant engineering

Artwork

- Modino Graphics - artwork, design
- Roderick Angle - band photo
- Keith Wick - live photos
