= International Hardcore Superstar =

Studio album by Danny Diablo
- Released: October 6, 2009
- Recorded: 2009
- Genre: Hardcore punk; hip hop
- Length: 1:03:56
- Label: Hellcat
- Producer: Tim Armstrong; Danny Diablo

Danny Diablo chronology
When Worlds Collide (2008)	International Hardcore Superstar (2009)	The Blood Of Eden (2012)

International Hardcore Superstar is the sixth studio album by Danny Diablo. It was released on October 6, 2009, via Tim Armstrong's Hellcat Records. The record is the follow-up to his 2007 album Thugcore 4 Life.

== Track listing ==
No.	Title	Length
1.	"Sex And Violence" (featuring Everlast & Tim Armstrong)	3:26
2.	"Kill Em Dead"	3:04
3.	"International Hardcore Superstar" (featuring Vinnie Paz)	4:59
4.	"Working Class"	3:55
5.	"Cold Beer" (featuring Prince Metropolitan)	5:01
6.	"Give Me A Chance" (featuring White Lion)	4:21
7.	"Blood Money"	4:55
8.	"Don't You Want Me" (featuring Natasha Nicholson)
9.	"Shot Gun Blast"	2:36
10.	"P.S. I Love You"	2:24
11.	"The Chosen Few" (featuring Sick Jacken)	4:51
12.	"2 Hip" (featuring Natasha Nicholson)	5:19
13.	"Put Your Hands Up" (featuring Big Left & Ceekay Jones)	4:45
14.	"Queens Killaz" (featuring Prince Metropolitan & Cynic)	4:55
15.	"Goodbye Farewell"	3:57
16.	"Supreme 1 The Alpha Male" (Bonus track)	5:28
Total length:		1:03:56

== Samples ==
- "Sex And Violence" contains samples of The Exploited's song "Sex & Violence" from their 1981 album Punks Not Dead

== Personnel ==
- Dan Singer - main performer, producer
- Erik Schrody - performer
- Jack Gonzalez - performer
- Natasha Nicholson - additional vocals
- Richard Alfaro - performer
- Tim Armstrong - producer, performer
- Toby Morse - additional vocals
- Vincenzo Luvineri - performer
- Big Left, Ceekay Jones, Prince Metropolitan - guest performers
