= Imprint (Vision of Disorder album) =

Studio album by Vision of Disorder
- Released: July 28, 1998
- Recorded: April 1–19, 1998
- Studios: Sear Sound (New York City); Studio 900 (New York City); The Magic Shop (New York City)
- Genres: Metalcore; heavy metal; hardcore punk
- Length: 43:33
- Label: Roadrunner
- Producer: Dave Sardy

Vision of Disorder chronology
Vision of Disorder (1996)	Imprint (1998)	For the Bleeders (1999)

Imprint is the second studio album by the American metalcore band Vision of Disorder, released on July 28, 1998, through Roadrunner Records. Recorded with producer Dave Sardy at various studios in New York City in April 1998, it is a metalcore, heavy metal, and hardcore punk album featuring a raw sound and complex rhythms and arrangements. Its lyrics were primarily inspired by vocalist Tim Williams receiving a permanently scarring face injury, depicted on the album's cover, and are centered on turning negative experiences into positive ones. Pantera vocalist Phil Anselmo makes a guest appearance on "By the River".

Imprint received positive reviews from critics and debuted at number 10 on the Billboard Heatseekers Albums Chart and number 197 on the UK Albums Chart. Vision of Disorder toured internationally in support of the album and embarked on a co-headlining tour of North America with labelmates Sepultura and Earth Crisis. Four months after its release, Roadrunner pulled the band's touring support, leading to their exit from the label. Retrospectively, Imprint has been described as an influential metalcore album, with Kerrang! and Metal Hammer listing it as one of the genre's greatest albums.

== Background and recording ==
In 1996, Vision of Disorder released their debut album through the Roadrunner Records imprint label Supersoul. Following the album's release, Supersoul was shut down and the band signed directly to Roadrunner. After touring in support of the album and performing on the inaugural Ozzfest tour, Vision of Disorder began writing material for their second album, Imprint. Pre-production commenced in November 1997, and the band spent seven or eight months rehearsing together. Guitarists Matt Baumbach and Mike Kennedy and bassist Mike Fleischmann wrote most of the album's material before discussing their arrangements and figuring out a drum part with Brendon Cohen. The band then gave a demo to vocalist Tim Williams, who would come up with lyrics in a day, according to Baumbach.

Vision of Disorder recorded Imprint with producer Dave Sardy between April 1 and April 19, 1998, at Sear Sound, Studio 900 and The Magic Shop in New York City. Baumbach said that the band wanted to work with Sardy after listening to his albums with Helmet and Skeleton Key, which "all sounded like a band playing in a room – as compared to a bad, processed record like our [debut]". Cohen recorded his drum tracks in twelve hours. The last song completed for Imprint was "By the River", a duet with Pantera vocalist Phil Anselmo, whom Williams was introduced to during the Ozzfest tour by Robb Flynn of Machine Head. With the rest of the band's approval, Williams asked Anselmo to make an appearance on the album and subsequently travelled to New Orleans to record his vocals. Williams and Anselmo recorded at the same studio used by Down for their debut album NOLA (1995).

== Composition ==
Imprint is a metalcore, heavy metal, and hardcore punk album. Retaining the metal/hardcore crossover style of Vision of Disorder's debut, it features a rawer, more experimental sound, complex arrangements, shifting rhythms and time signature changes, and melodic elements. The 1997 albums OK Computer by Radiohead and Through Silver in Blood by Neurosis, which the band got into during Ozzfest, served as influences on the album's writing. Fleischmann highlighted the influence of the latter on "Twelve Steps to Nothing", "By The River", and "Colorblind". Williams frequently switches between shouted, screamed and clean vocals during songs. Jason Arnopp of Kerrang! likened his vocals to Obituary's John Tardy, Death's Chuck Schuldiner, and Gorilla's John Whitby.

Williams said that the main theme of Imprint is turning negative experiences into positive ones. In an interview with Terrorizer, he said that much of its lyrics are about "situations – like fights – that I got caught up in". One particular incident, which resulted in his face being permanently scarred by a razorblade, served as the "catalyst" behind many of the album's lyrics. Its cover artwork is a hospital photo of Williams' injury, manipulated on the computer by Kennedy. In an interview with Metal Hammer, Williams said that although he did not want the incident to be the album's "focal point" – it was not mentioned in its press bio – Imprint "would have been totally different" if it had not occurred. He also said he was no longer concerned about what others thought about his lyrics and their subject matters.

Greg Prato of AllMusic called Imprint's opening track, "What You Are", an example of its "over-the-top assault[s] on the senses". "Twelve Steps to Nothing" features four alternating rhythms, whilst "Landslide" progresses from frenetic riffing and drumming into a bridge with shimmering guitars. "By the River" is a duet between Williams' and Anselmo, with the latter using guttural screams and spoken word vocals. Williams derived its title from one of Anselmo's lyrics. The album's title track is about Williams' scarring injury and how he dealt with it. "Colorblind", which Williams viewed as a tribute to The Doors, offsets its "pantherlike lunge and thurst" with "chiming" guitarwork, according to Nick Terry of Terrorizer. "Up in You" criticizes "scenester posturing" behaviour that Williams felt was detrimental to the hardcore community. Written a day before recording commenced, the closing track of Imprint, "Jada Bloom", recounts "an emotive tale of addiction and lost love" and progresses from an aggressive beginning into more melancholic territory, per Terrorizer's Zena Tsarfin.

== Release and promotion ==
Imprint was released in the United States on July 28, 1998, and in Europe on August 3, 1998. The album debuted and peaked at number 10 on the Billboard Heatseekers Albums Chart, and number 197 on the UK Albums Chart. In July 1998, Vision of Disorder toured the East Coast of the United States with Day in the Life. The band then toured with Anthrax, before embarking on a co-headlining tour of North America with Roadrunner labelmates Sepultura and Earth Crisis. Vision of Disorder spent the rest of 1998 touring the countries of Japan, New Zealand and Australia, and the U.S. state of Hawaii. Tensions during the Australia tour almost led to the band breaking up that year.

According to Fleischmann, Roadrunner pulled Vision of Disorder's tour support four months after Imprint's release and asked them to start working on another album; he said the band were offended by this and took it as a sign the label "hated" the album and them. After several meetings, Vision of Disorder left the label. Fleischmann said that Vision of Disorder were offered a better record deal and a $150,000 advance for their third album with Roadrunner but turned it down, citing the label's perceived lack of faith in the band and their desire to have a fresh start. Imprint was later reissued in 2004 as part of Roadrunner's "Two From the Vault" series with Vision of Disorder, and by Music on Vinyl in 2018.

== Reception and legacy ==
Professional ratings
Review scores
Source	Rating
AllMusic	4.5/5 stars
Brave Words & Bloody Knuckles	8/10
Collector's Guide to Heavy Metal	7/10
Juice	5/5 stars
Kerrang!	4/5 stars
Metal Hammer	7/10
Metal Storm	9.0/10
Rock Hard	7/10
Terrorizer	5/5 stars

Imprint received positive reviews from critics. Prato of AllMusic and Arnopp of Kerrang! both praised the album for presenting a heavy sound differing from contemporary acts similar to Korn; the former hailed it as "the best heavy album of 1998". Terry of Terrorizer likened it to Pantera's Far Beyond Driven (1994), considering it to have such "obvious" crossover appeal "as to make any normal conventions around the hardcore/metal divide redundant." Martin Popoff highlighted its complex arrangements and alternating vocals and called it "Organic, manic, and stuck underground like a pig". In a more mixed review, Mike Breen of the Cincinnati CityBeat felt that Vision of Disorder's "wall of rage gets pretty linear after a few listens". Jan Jaedike of Rock Hard likewise stated that whilst its "level of aggression remains high, powerfully impressive, and effortlessly flattens everything in its path [...] this also includes the individuality of [Vision of Disorder]."

In 2000, Terrorizer listed Imprint as one of the 100 most important albums of the 1990s. Kerrang! and Metal Hammer both included the album in their lists of metalcore's greatest albums. In a 2011 retrospective on Vision of Disorder's career for MetalSucks, Finn McKenty (a.k.a. Sergeant D) called Imprint "a landmark record" and believed that, regardless of how much acknowledgement they received, much of contemporary metalcore and screamo music was heavily indebted to the band and album. Gallows guitarist Laurent "Lags" Barnard, writing for Metal Hammer in 2015, called Imprint metalcore's first successful album, citing the support it received from the press, as well as "the most enduring and influential album of its genre", with later metalcore bands such as Killswitch Engage and Trivium expanding on Williams' vocal style on the album. In 2017, Nate Hertweck of Grammy.com said that its "pure, unadulterated aggression [...] still sounds grating, pained and eviscerating nearly 20 years later."

Bassist Stuart "Stu" Ross, also a member of Gallows, cited Imprint as an influence on his songwriting and his other band Misery Signals. Producer and Fit for an Autopsy guitarist Will Putney, who would go on to produce Vision of Disorder's fifth album The Cursed Remain Cursed (2012), said that "Imprint was like listening to Hell." Touché Amoré vocalist Jeremy Bolm featured the album in his 2016 list of "Ten Underrated Hardcore Records" for Vice, stating that he was "floored" by the album when it came out. Dave and Greg McPherson of InMe both credited Imprint with shaping their tastes in metal music; the former cited the album as an influence on their song "I Swear", from their eighth album Jumpstart Hope (2020).

== Track listing ==
All tracks are written by Vision of Disorder, except where noted.

Standard release
No.	Title	Lyrics	Length
1.	"What You Are"		3:35
2.	"Twelve Steps to Nothing"		3:42
3.	"Landslide"		3:29
4.	"By the River" (featuring Phil Anselmo)	Tim Williams; Phil Anselmo	3:36
5.	"Imprint"		3:45
6.	"Colorblind"		6:09
7.	"Rebirth of Tragedy"		3:58
8.	"Locust of the Dead Earth"		3:28
9.	"Up in You"		3:24
10.	"Clone"		4:10
11.	"Jada Bloom"		4:19
Total length:			43:33

Japanese edition
No.	Title	Writer(s)	Length
12.	"Soul Craft" (Bad Brains cover)	Gary Miller; Darryl Jenifer; Paul D. Hudson	2:32
Total length:			46:05

== Personnel ==
Adapted from liner notes.

Vision of Disorder
- Tim Williams – vocals
- Mike Kennedy – guitar
- Matt Baumbach – guitar
- Mike Fleischmann – bass
- Brendon Cohen – drums

Additional personnel

- Phil Anselmo – additional vocals on "By the River"
- Dave Sardy – organ on "Jada Bloom"
Production
- Dave Sardy – producer, mixing
- Vision of Disorder – producer, mixing (12)
- Larry Hundermark – producer, mixing (12)
- Greg Gordon – engineering
- Juan Garcia – assistant engineering
- Bryce Goggin – Pro Tools
- Vlado Meller – mastering

Artwork

- Vision of Disorder – artwork concept
- Jamie Miller – artwork concept
- Josh Kessler – group photo
- Jason Zampino – photography

== Charts ==
Chart performance for Imprint
Chart (1998)	Peak Position
UK Albums Chart (OCC)	197
US Heatseekers Albums (Billboard)	10
