= Danny Diablo =

American vocalist (born 1971)

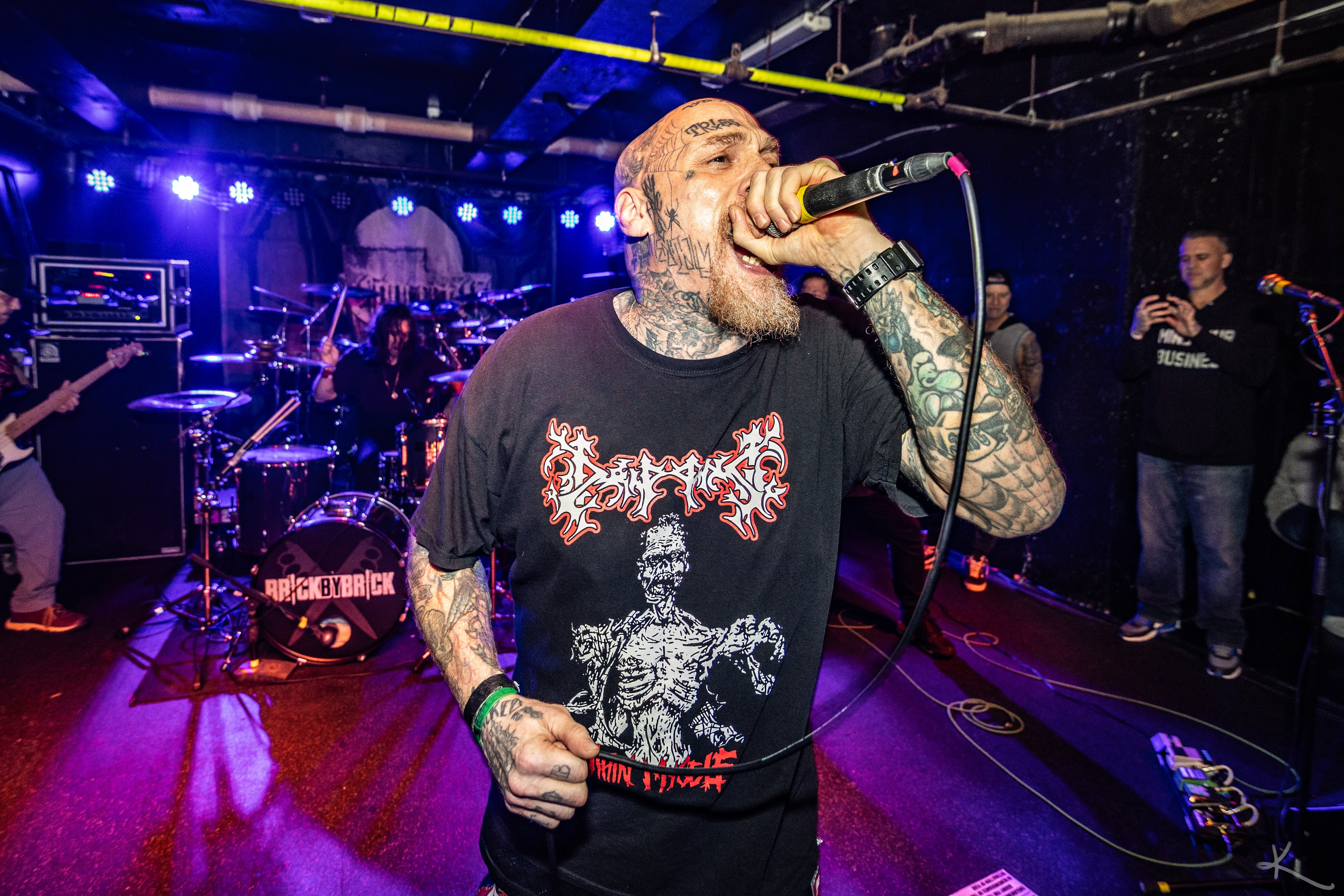

Background information
- Also known as: Lord Ezec; Danny D.
- Born: Dan Singer; December 20, 1971 (age 54); Manhattan, New York, U.S.
- Genres: Underground hip hop; nu metal; rapcore; hardcore punk
- Occupation: Vocalist
- Years active: 1994–present
- Labels: Force 5; LaSalle; Suburban Noize; Hellcat; ILL-ROC
- Website: dannydiablo.com

Dan Singer (born December 20, 1971), known professionally as Danny Diablo and Lord Ezec, is an American hardcore punk and hip hop vocalist based in New York City. He is currently a member of underground hip hop acts The ShotBlockers, KAOS 13 and FTW, as well as a founding member of hardcore bands Crown of Thornz, Skarhead, and Icepick.

== Early life ==
Dan Singer was born in Harlem, New York. He is the son of a Polish-Jewish police sergeant father, who is Brooklyn-born and a Puerto Rican homemaker mother from the East River Houses of Spanish Harlem. From an early age Singer would graffiti under the name Lord Ezec and became a follower of the NYC hardcore scene. He was originally into Hip-hop, however after getting introduced to bands such as Slayer and Agnostic Front he became a fan of the metal and punk genres.

== Musical career ==
=== Crown of Thornz ===
In 1994, Singer formed New York hardcore band Crown of Thornz consisting of former Breakdown guitarist Mike Dijan, drummer Dimi, and bassists Steve O'Brien and Franklin Rhi. In 1995, the band released their debut EP Train Yard Blues on Equal Vision Records, dedicating it to Singer's younger brother David, who had committed suicide the previous year. The following year the group released Mentally Vexed. In 1998, the band began a hiatus. In 2013, Crown of Thornz reunited for Ieperfest in Belgium, This Is Hardcore Fest in Philadelphia, and a North American tour with Rancid and the Transplants. On August 14, 2015, they released the two track single "Nothing But Tragedy", with Diablo on vocals, Matthew Mangiaracina on guitar and Rigg Ross on drums. They have since played live shows sporadically.

=== Skarhead ===
After Crown of Thornz went on hiatus, Singer formed Skarhead with Madball's guitarist Brian "Mitts" Daniels, bassist Hoya Roc, former White Trash bassist Aaron "White Owl" Collins, Murphy's Law's and Misfits' drummer Eric "Goat" Arce, and Puerto Rican Mike from District 9. The band released their debut EP Drugs, Money & Sex in 1997, followed by Kings at Crime on Victory Records in 1999.

=== Icepick ===
In 1996, Singer collaborated with Jamey Jasta to form the metalcore band Icepick, which served as a side project of Hatebreed, alongside their bandmates Derek Kerswill, Wayne Lozinak, and Frank Novinec. The group remained virtually stagnant until the song "Born to Crush You" appeared on UFC: Ultimate Beat Downs, Vol. 1 in August 2004. Former UFC heavyweight champion Andrei Arlovski frequently used their song "Onward to Victory" as his entrance music for fights. Icepick's debut album, Violent Epiphany, was released on April 18, 2006, under Jasta's record label Stillborn Records.

=== Wilding Incident ===
In the early 2010s Singer founded a new band called The Wilding Incident, which also features Jimmy Williams of Nausea and Maximum Penalty. The groups debut Ep Prey for the Wolfpack was released in 2016.

=== Smoke AxD ===
In December of 2023, it was announced Singer had joined a new supergroup called Smoke AxD with Hoya Roc (formerly of Madball), guitarist Sean Martin (Hatebreed), and drummer Dimi Douvas who is one of his bandmates in Crown of Thornz. Their first single was released in March of 2024, and their debut Ep Vaya Con Dios was released on May 7, of that year.

=== Solo ===
Singer's first solo recording began with "D.R.E.A.M." by the Transplants, which led him to sign with Travis Barker of Blink-182's LaSalle Records for the 2005 release of his Hardcore 4 Life EP. Diablo included some of its tracks on Thugcore 4 Life record released in 2007, featuring the Tim Armstrong-produced track "Living By The Gun". His friendship with Armstrong continued, and he moved to Epitaph Records and signed with Tim's Hellcat Records to release his sophomore solo album International Hardcore Superstar in 2009. The album included guest appearances by La Coka Nostra members Vinnie Paz, Sick Jacken, and Tim himself.

In early 2012, Singer founded his own independent record label, ILL-ROC Records and released his third solo album, The Blood Of Eden, which featured Madchild, Bizarre, Adil Omar, and the ILL-ROC roster. He went to Paris and released his fourth solo album, Dollerz Make Sense, in 2016 with label Knives Out Records. In 2017 he signed with Force 5 Records to release his fifth album The Crackson Heights Project.

=== Production ===
Singer has made vocal appearances on releases by Ceekay Jones, Jay R, Grizz, and Prince Metropolitan.

== Acting career ==
Singer has made multiple appearances in both long and short films. In 2020, he co started alongside Peter Greene in the Tom Vujcic short film Princeless. He and Greene both won an IndieX Film Festival award in the Outstanding Achievement Award (Acting Duo) category for their performance. From 2022 to 2025 he played Randy Roachtrap in the Tv mini series Crash the System. He played meth dealer 1 in the 2024 horror film Directors Cut.

== Personal life ==
Singer has a son. His younger brother David committed suicide, which had a huge impact on him, he stated that the only thing that helped him grieve was Disintegration by The Cure.

In 1993 Singer got into an altercation where he was stabbed with a screwdriver and almost died. However he was also nearly charged for attempted murder by the court because of the beating his attacker took.

Since 2018 Singer has hosted the Diablo's Den podcast.

== Discography ==
=== Studio albums ===
- 2007 - Thugcore 4 Life
- 2009 - International Hardcore Superstar
- 2012 - The Blood of Eden
- 2016 - Doller Make Sense
- 2017 - The Crackson Heights Project
- 2019 - Diablo's Way Mixtape

=== Extended plays ===
- 2005 - Hardcore 4 Life

=== Compilation albums ===
- 2003 - The Street CD Volume 1
- 2005 - Street C.D. Volume # 2
- 2008 - Hardcore 4 The Coldhearted
- 2016 - Force 5 Records Mixtape Vol. 1

=== Vs series ===
- 2008 - When Worlds Collide (w/ The Vendetta)

=== Collaborative albums ===
- 2016 - The World Is Fucked (w/ Skriptkeeper & Tony Slippaz as FTW)
- 2020 - Devils & Demons (w/Mars)
- 2021 - Spictacular (w/S.P.I.C)
- 2023 - Danny Diablo vs. Piss Mobb (w/Piss Mobb)
- 2024 - Vaya Con Dios (Ep)

=== Guest appearances ===
Year	Song	Artist	Album
2001	"Unified"	Biohazard, Roger Miret, Puerto Rican Mike	Uncivilization
2002	"D.R.E.A.M."	Transplants	Transplants
2004	"Spit My Rage"	Terror, Jamie Jasta	One with the Underdogs
2004	"Watch Your Back"	Necro	The Pre-Fix for Death
2005	"Unstoppable"	Subzero	The Suffering of Man
2007	"Put 'Em Up"	Big B	More to Hate
2008	"Nothing To Prove"	H_{2}O	Nothing to Prove
2008	"Desperados"	Riviera Regime, Necro	Real Soldierz Ride
2013	"Go Fuck Yourself"	Deez Nutz	Bout It!
2015	"Danny Diablo vs Cirex"	Cirex	Single
2020	"Danny Diablo vs Chris Brown"	TRAPT	
