= Six and Violence =

American New York hardcore band

The Six and Violence
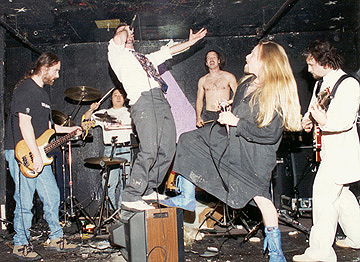
- The Six and Violence c.2004

Background information
- Origin: Queens, New York, United States
- Genres: Heavy metal, thrash metal, punk
- Years active: 1984–2005
- Labels: Fist Records, Striving For Togetherness Records, Dignified Bastard Records
- Members: Kurt Stenzel; Dave Miranda; Ray Amico; Kenn Kim
- Past members: J. Garino; Paul Gazzara; Jim Starace; Jim Vafeas; Chris Sorgie; Mr. Clarke; Ron Zirin
- Website: sixandviolence.com

The Six and Violence was an American musical group in the genre of New York hardcore. Established in Queens, New York, United States, in 1985, the band appeared at the seminal club CBGBs and other punk and heavy metal related venues in the New York area between 1985 and 2005. The band released 2 full-length albums and a series of demos, singles, and EPs throughout their career. The Six and Violence is also featured on hardcore and punk compilations from the 1980s and 1990s.

The band consisted of 6 members with line-up changes over 20 years. The most consistent line-up consisted of Kurt Stenzel on vocals, Paul Gazzara on vocals (deceased February 9, 2005), Dave Miranda on drums, Ray Amico on guitar, J. Garino (deceased 2011) on bass, and Kenneth Kim (deceased 2020) on cymbals. The live presentation consisted of two vocalists, as well as two percussionists who played drums and cymbals in a standing position. The band appeared twice on the Uncle Floyd Show in 1987.

Guitarist Jim Vafeas and Vocalist Chris Sorgie were among the first members, later replaced by Ray and Paul.

The Six and Violence is notable for being unorthodox within the genre of punk and hardcore, and achieved national college radio play based on comedic elements with songs such as "Golf" and "Planet of the Apes". Six and Violence is also known for musical departures more associated with progressive rock and Jethro Tull frontman Ian Anderson guested on 1990's Lettuce Prey album.

Lyrical content varied from the silly "Hamburger Hairdo" to the philosophical, "All my Best Friends are Turning into their Dads" as well as the controversial “I’m Gonna Kick God’s Ass” and “Death to Guidos”.

The band continues to get seasonal radio play with their Christmas single “Xmas Pigs”, an anti-consumerist spin on the Black Sabbath classic "War Pigs". Their 1991 anti-Gulf War single “Armageddon Outta Here” found relevance with the second U.S. war in Iraq.

The Six and Violence is also notable for their use of props and costumes on stage, including men in gorilla suits, women dressed as nuns, and the demolition of television sets and drums with chainsaws. The band was also known for throwing golf balls, hamburgers and bananas at the audience, and often engaged in dangerous stage antics.

== Recordings ==
The full-length records are Lettuce Prey (Fist Records 1990) and Petty Staycheck (Striving For Togetherness Records 1995). Fist records is notable as having released the first Warzone record, and Striving For Togetherness pioneered a resurgence in New York hardcore with releases by Vision of Disorder, Shutdown, and 25 ta Life.

In 2005, The Six and Violence was featured on the soundtrack to the Eidos video game "Backyard Wrestling Vol. 2” as well as a number of independent films. Despite only two full-length recordings, the band retains a loyal cult following in the U.S. and abroad.

In October 2007, Dignified Bastard Records released a two disc retrospective of the band's career, containing both "Lettuce Prey" and Petty Staycheck" discs as well as rare and unheard gems.

== Where are they now ==
Drummer Dave Miranda has been involved with prog rock trio The Magic Elf. He has also been producer for various independent artists. Guitarist Ray Amico is road manager for many established musical acts including his childhood heroes Devo. Singer/Songwriter Kurt Stenzel fronted or co-fronted musical and performance art projects, Cookin’ With Kurt, Lopsided Space Kart and SpacEKrafT. Kurt Stenzel has also been composing for film. His first feature-length film is Jodorowsky's Dune.
