= Striving For Togetherness Records =

American independent hardcore music label

Striving For Togetherness Records (aka SFT Records) is an independent hardcore music label known for its mid-1990s New York hardcore releases.

== Notable releases ==
- Intent to Injure - "Habit of Thought" 7-inch
- Headfirst - "Intervention" 7-inch
- V/A - "X Marks the Spot" 7-inch (straight edge compilation)
- Without a Cause - "Nation of Neglect" 7-inch
- Stick Figure - "Meat & Potatoes" 7-inch
- Up Front - "Changes" 7-inch
- Choose X - "Our Struggle" 7-inch
- 25 ta Life - s/t 7-inch (later re-released as a CD EP)
- District 9 - "Schoolahardknox" 7-inch
- Vision of Disorder - "Still" 7-inch
- No Redeeming Social Value/Six and Violence - split 7-inch
- No Redeeming Social Value - "Rocks the Party" CD
- No Redeeming Social Value - "Three Way Dance" (1988)
- V/A - N.Y.H.C. Documentary Soundtrack CD
- Fahrenheit 451 - "The Thought of It" CD
- Shutdown - Turning the Tide" CD EP
- No Redeeming Social Value - "Hardcore Your Lousy Ass Off" CD
- Six and Violence - "Petty Staycheck" CD
- Neck - s/t CD
- V/A - "Three Way Dance" CD (feat. Six and Violence, No Redeeming Social Value and Romantic Gorilla)
- No Redeeming Social Value - "THC" CD
