= Thugcore 4 Life =

Studio album by Danny Diablo
- Released: August 14, 2007
- Recorded: 2007
- Studio: Tim's Basement, Los Angeles, CA; Atomic Studios, New York, NY; Planet Z, Hadley, MA; Lethal Dose Studio; Stimulated Studios; Subnoize Compound
- Genre: Hardcore punk; hip hop
- Length: 52:20
- Label: Suburban Noize; Epitaph
- Producer: Dante Ross; John Morrical; Tim Armstrong; Necro; Zuess; Lord Ezec; DJ Spae

Danny Diablo chronology
| Hardcore 4 Life (2005) | Thugcore 4 Life (2007) | Hardcore 4 The Coldhearted (2008) |

Thugcore 4 Life is the fourth studio album by American hip hop and hardcore punk artist, Danny Diablo. It was released August 14, 2007 via Suburban Noize Records. The album was praised by both hardcore punk fans as well as hip hop fans. This release was also the only Suburban Noize album to be distributed by Epitaph Records. American actor Peter Greene was featured in their music video, "Mechanix".

Professional ratings
Review scores
| Source | Rating |
|---|---|
| RapReviews | 5.5/10 stars |

== Track listing ==
| No. | Title | Length |
|---|---|---|
| 1. | "We Don't Care" | 3:15 |
| 2. | "Get Down" | 4:48 |
| 3. | "Banged Out" | 3:36 |
| 4. | "Funky Rhyme" (featuring Daddy X, Stress & Havok) | 3:50 |
| 5. | "Jersey White Trash" | 3:17 |
| 6. | "I'm A Shotblocker!!!" (featuring Prince Metropolitan, CeeKay & Panic) | 4:12 |
| 7. | "Livin' By The Gun" | 4:07 |
| 8. | "Satanic Shamrocks" (featuring Slaine, Skinhead Rob, Danny Boy & Big Left) | 5:19 |
| 9. | "Unstoppable" | 3:57 |
| 10. | "Mechanix" (featuring Necro, Skinhead Rob & Prince Metropolitan) | 5:11 |
| 11. | "The Harsh Truth" (The Icemen cover) | 5:06 |
| 12. | "Hardcore 4 Life" | 5:48 |
| Total length: | | 52:26 |

== Personnel ==
- Dan Singer - primary artist, executive producer, lead vocals, writer
- Big Left - guest vocals on track 8
- Brad Xavier - executive producer, writer, guest vocals on track 4
- Casey Quintal - art direction, design
- CeeKay Jones - guest vocals on track 6
- Chris Love - photography
- Daniel O’Connor - guest vocals on track 8
- Dante Ross - producer
- Dave Carlock - engineer
- Dean Baltulonis - engineer
- George Carroll - writer, guest vocals on track 8
- Havok of the Subhoodz - guest vocals on track 4
- Jamey Jasta - executive producer
- John Edney - engineer, mixing
- John Morrical - producer
- Panic of the ShotBlockers - guest vocals on track 6
- Patrick Shevelin - engineer, mastering
- Prince Metropolitan - guest vocals on tracks 6 and 10
- Rob Aston - writer, guest vocals on tracks 8 and 10
- Ron Braunstein - writer, guest vocals on track 10
- Stress of the Subhoodz - guest vocals on track 4
- Tim Armstrong - engineer, executive producer, writer
