= Friendship Loyalty Commitment =

Friendship, Loyalty, Commitment

Studio album by 25 ta Life
- Released: July 6, 1999
- Recorded: 1999
- Genre: Heavy hardcore
- Length: 32:40
- Label: Triple Crown / Good Life
- Producer: 25 ta Life, Joe Hogan

25 ta Life chronology
| Strength Through Unity. The Spirit Remains (1997) | Friendship, Loyalty, Commitment (1999) | Best of Friends/Enemies (2003) |

Friendship, Loyalty, Commitment is the debut studio album by American heavy hardcore band 25 ta Life, released on July 6, 1999. The album features a Warzone cover song "As One" and special appearances by Jamey Jasta of Hatebreed, Roger Miret and Vinnie Stigma of Agnostic Front, Jimmy Gestapo from Murphy's Law, Paul Bearer from Sheer Terror, and more. The song "Over the Years" was featured on the Tony Hawk's Underground 2 soundtrack.

AllMusic described the album as "a set of slamming street-level hardcore/metal grooves that take no prisoners."

== Track listing ==
1. "Let the Past Be the Past"
2. "Pain Is Temporary"
3. "Hardcore Rules"
4. "Backfire"
5. "Positive Hardcore, Go!"
6. "Friendship, Loyalty, Commitment"
7. "The Next Level"
8. "Bullet for Every Enemy"
9. "Over the Years"
10. "Refocus"
11. "Wise to da Game"
12. "Da Lowdown"
13. "Short Fuse"
14. "As One" (Warzone cover)
15. "Smakin' You Up"

== Credits ==
- Rick Healey – vocals
- Fred Mesk – guitar
- Dave Urban – bass
- Rob Pallotta – drums
- Joe Hogan – engineering, mixing
- Alan Douches – mastering
- Kentax – artwork
- Produced by 25 ta Life and Joe Hogan
- Additional personnel: Jamey Jasta, Jimmy Gestapo, Roger Miret, Vinnie Stigma, Paul Bearer
