= From Bliss to Devastation =

Studio album by Vision of Disorder
- Released: June 19, 2001
- Recorded: 2001
- Genre: Alternative metal; nu metal; hard rock
- Length: 54:16
- Label: TVT, Victor Entertainment Japan
- Producer: Machine

Vision of Disorder chronology
For the Bleeders (1999)	From Bliss to Devastation (2001)	The Cursed Remain Cursed (2012)

Professional ratings
Review scores
Source	Rating
AllMusic	2/5 stars

From Bliss to Devastation is the fourth studio album by American metalcore band Vision of Disorder, released on June 19, 2001 through TVT Records.

Citing a lack of support from TVT, Vision of Disorder went on hiatus before breaking up the following year in 2002. A follow-up, The Cursed Remain Cursed, was released on September 18, 2012.

== Musical style ==
This album has more of an alternative metal sound mixed with hard rock and nu metal. In addition to the change in musical style, the songs feature a verse-chorus-verse structure. On the band's different approach to writing for the album, vocalist Tim Williams stated:

The songwriting is much more stuck to the classic boundaries of songwriting as far as a verse and chorus. Before we had no respect for songwriting and that was our style and we liked that. But now we are getting older and we want to be able to make music that you can just sit back hit play and listen to it.

== Track listing ==
All tracks are written by Vision of Disorder.

No.	Title	Length
1.	"Living to Die"	4:06
2.	"Southbound"	4:52
3.	"Itchin' to Bleed"	2:57
4.	"Sunshine"	3:00
5.	"On the Table"	3:51
6.	"From Bliss to Devastation"	6:11
7.	"Downtime Misery"	3:50
8.	"Pretty Hate"	4:14
9.	"Without You"	3:15
10.	"Overrun"	3:47
11.	"Done In"	3:10
12.	"Regurgitate"	3:06
13.	"Walking the Line"	3:45

Japanese version bonus tracks
No.	Title	Length
14.	"In the Room" (New Version)	3:03
15.	"Blacktoned Child"	3:08

== Personnel ==
Vision of Disorder

- Tim Williams – vocals
- Matt Baumbach – guitar
- Mike Kennedy – guitar
- Mike Fleischmann – bass
- Brendon Cohen – drums

Production

- Machine – producer, mixing, engineer, drum programming, sound designer
- Jeff Juliano – engineer
- Bob Ludwig – mastering
- Clinton Bradley – drum programming, sound designer
- John Colangelo – drum technician
- Matt Mead – guitar tech

Artwork

- Paul R. Brown – art direction, design, photography
- Nala – CD artwork
