= Painstream =

Finnish hardcore punk band

Painstream is a Finnish hardcore punk band. Formed in 2000 in the city of Turku, they began as an "old school HC"-style band. They play fast HC punk with some metal influences. Painstream stands out in their local punk scene by their use of different instruments such as the Hammond organ, saxophone and cello in some of their songs.

== Discography ==
- Painstream (2002 in music)
- Turku Hardcore (2003 in music)
- Á bas les tyrans' (2004 in music) French title translated to English means "Down with Tyranny!"
