= The Anthrax =

The Anthrax was a highly regarded all-ages music venue that hosted punk and hardcore shows in Connecticut. To the many touring acts that played there, The Anthrax was as essential a stop as punk rock landmarks like New York City's CBGB or 924 Gilman Street in Berkeley, California. Founded in 1982 by brothers Brian and Shaun Sheridan, the actual club was located in the basement of a makeshift art gallery on the then dilapidated west side of Stamford, Connecticut, at 70 Main Street. The space was small and the stage was barely 5 inches off the ground. Many bands played the small Stamford location including 7 Seconds, Corrosion of Conformity, Youth of Today, RKL and Circle Jerks. By the summer of 1986, the reputation of The Anthrax grew and attendance at shows had outgrown the physical space. The Stamford location closed its doors and within 3 months the Anthrax reopened at a much larger location at 25 Perry Avenue in nearby Norwalk, Connecticut. At the Norwalk location, the club's reputation continued to grow and Brian and Shaun Sheridan continued to book shows until November 1990 when a neighboring apartment complex won a decision against the club in a zoning dispute.

Among the many influential bands that performed the Norwalk location were Reagan Youth, The Exploited, 7 Seconds, MDC, Descendents, Government Issue, NOFX, Die Kreuzen, Fugazi, Sick of It All, Dag Nasty and many more. The Anthrax is often mentioned in books about hardcore history. The book Everybody's Scene by Chris Daily is solely about The Anthrax and contains many photographs.
