= Still (Vision of Disorder EP) =

EP by Vision of Disorder
- Released: 1995
- Recorded: 1995
- Studio: Big Blue Meenie Recording Studio
- Genre: Metalcore; hardcore punk; groove metal
- Length: 17:03
- Label: SFT Records
- Producer: Tim Gillies and Vision of Disorder

Vision of Disorder chronology
| Still (1995) | Vision of Disorder (1996) |

Professional ratings
Review scores
| Source | Rating |
|---|---|
| AllMusic | 3/5 stars |

Still is the first EP by American metalcore/hardcore band Vision of Disorder, released in 1995.

== Track listing ==
1995 vinyl release

| No. | Title | Length |
|---|---|---|
| 1. | "Through My Eyes" | 3:47 |
| 2. | "Choke" | 2:36 |
| 3. | "Beneath the Green" | 4:13 |
| 4. | "Watch Out" | 2:14 |
| Total length: | | 12:50 |

1996 CD release (US, Europe)

| No. | Title | Length |
|---|---|---|
| 5. | "D.T.O." | 4:11 |
| 6. | "No Regrets" | 2:10 |
| Total length: | | 19:11 |

1996 CD release (Spain)

| No. | Title | Length |
|---|---|---|
| 7. | "Formula for Failure (Live)" | 4:22 |
| Total length: | | 23:33 |
