= Stillborn Records =

American independent record label

- Founder: Jamey Jasta
- Distributor: Caroline Distribution
- Genre: Heavy metal, hardcore punk, metalcore
- Country of origin: United States
- Official website: stillbornrecords.com

Stillborn Records is an American-based independent record label, founded by Jamey Jasta of Hatebreed, and primarily operated by Jay Reason of the Distance. Stillborn Records has released a variety of bands, mainly focused in the genres of heavy metal and hardcore punk. Stillborn Records is based in West Haven, Connecticut.

== Distribution ==
Stillborn Records releases are currently distributed through many well-known worldwide distributors, including but not limited to Caroline Distribution, RevHQ.com, Interpunk.com, iTunes, and via their own website StillbornRecords.com.

== Stillborn Fest ==
Stillborn Records is the organizer of the annual Stillborn Fest, that takes place over multiple dates in multiple cities around the US. The festival features current Stillborn Records artists as well as other artists not on the label's roster. Stillborn Fest has featured such bands as Hatebreed, H_{2}O, A Life Once Lost, Crowbar, and Thy Will Be Done.

== Featured bands ==
- Abolish
- Another Victim
- Better Left Unsaid
- Blacklisted
- Bloodwar
- Candiria
- Catalepsy
- Channel
- Clear
- Cold as Life
- Damnation
- Suffokate
- Dead to the World
- Dead Wrong
- Deadbeat
- Death Threat
- Dying Breed
- Full Blown Chaos
- Hatebreed
- Hoods
- Icepick
- Integrity
- Jasta 14
- Legacy of Pain
- Love Is Red
- Neglect
- One 4 One
- Overthrow
- The Program
- Pushbutton Warfare
- Right Brigade
- Ringworm
- The Risk Taken
- Scurvy
- Stalemate
- Strength for a Reason
- Subzero
- The Takeover
- A Thousand Falling Skies
- Thy Will Be Done
- The Ugly Truth
- Voice of Reason
- What Feeds the Fire
- With Honor
- The World We Knew
- The Wrong Side
