= Scapegrace =

The word scapegrace appears in the title of several books. including The Scapegrace by Sylvia Thorpe. A brand of gin uses the word in its name. A 1916 film is titled Scapegrace.

- Dick Lightheart, The Scapegrace of London (1879)
- Jack; The Story of a Scapegrace by Emily M. Bryant (1897)
- Andy Dodge; The History of a Scapegrace by Mark Pierce Pendleton

Frances Aymar Mathews wrote "Six to One, Or, The Scapegrace: A Comedietta in One Act".
