= Tripface =

Tripface was an American hardcore punk band from Long Island, operating between 1993 and 1997. Band members went on to join Glassjaw and In This Moment.

== History ==
In 1992, Jeff Fabb (Drums), Brian Langan (Guitar), and Brian Green (Bass) started a nameless punk/metal band on the rural eastern end of Long Island. They enlisted friend Scott Jarzombek, to sing. The band’s remote geographic location automatically made them outsiders to the Long Island and NYC scene. The band began to organize and play shows with their friends within their small town, in basements, recreation halls, and garages. For the most part, they were parties, gatherings of a handful of skaters, metalheads, and geeks from the local area high schools. The bills were always shared with their friends Grid and a mix of side projects.

Within the first year, the band went through numerous members, styles, and names. For a short time, it morphed into a side project, Offsides, with Scott moving to bass and his best friend, Ross Milligan, taking over vocals. Sometimes the band would play under the name Offsides and other times as Tripface. Sometimes they would play together, sharing a set. It was Ross who would later solidify the band as Tripface.

The first lineup to record was a version of Offsides, in which guitarist Austin Macdonald moved to bass, Scott was back on vocals, and a school friend, Rory, played guitar. This lineup also played live on WUSB’s Riptide. The set was recorded and released as a split cassette with Grid. After a kind review in Artie Philly’s “Paranoid Zine” section of Under the Volcano, Long Island began to take notice of the small East End hardcore scene.

After a handful of shows and several failed attempts to record a demo, this lineup ceased to function. The band’s popularity, however, continued to grow with the circulation of the split cassette. Jay May, a fellow East End resident who had been doing sound at local Long Island shows and had recorded an unreleased Offsides demo, approached Scott and Austin about reforming the band with himself on guitar.

== Some Part Sorrow line up ==
The band was reborn, recruiting Dave Allen to play bass and Pete Ruland on drums. This would be its final and most productive lineup. Playing a cross of 1990s metalcore and NYHC, the band grew in popularity on Long Island and began to make a dent on the East Coast.

After a few months, the band recorded the Closed In demo. It included the title track, “Brotherhood,” which had been written not long before by the first Godhead lineup, and an Offsides original, “I’ve Lost.” The band played on WUSB again and another split cassette with Grid was released. Austin left the band soon after, over musical and ideological differences.

This final lineup was the most productive and well-known incarnation of Tripface. Tripface would go on to play many shows, including CBGBs, the QE2, Right Track Inn, the PWAC, and the Wetlands, sharing stages with bands like Warzone, Sheer Terror, Agnostic Front, Hatebreed, and Outburst. They did only one East Coast tour, with NYHC legends Indecision, but did numerous long weekends with bands like Marauder, Blood for Blood, and Earth Crisis.

In 1994 Artie Philly’s new subsidiary of Wreckage Records, Exit, agreed to release the This Foundation EP. Not long after, they were taken under the wing of Tyler King at King-sized booking, who can be credited with much of the band’s later success. Exit would release their CD, Some Part Sorrow, in 1996. Tracks were also featured on the From the Ground Up compilation (Eyeball Records), the Mindset Overhaul compilation (Wreakage Records), and the Release DVD (Victory Records).

In 1997, Scott Jarzombek was kicked out due to internal differences. The band recruited Tommy Corrigan from Silent Majority to form the short-lived Advent. Even after their break-up, the band continued to get critical acclaim for their recordings. Some Part Sorrow was voted NYHC Album of the Year by In Effect Fanzine and was featured on a list of Alternative Press' “Essential but Obscure Long Island Records.”

Motherbox Records has recently released the band's discography titled, Some Part Hope.

== Discography ==
ST Demo (Self Released) 1993
Split Live Cassette with Grid (Riptide Recordings) 1993
Closed in Demo (Self Release) 1994
Split Live Cassette with Grid (Riptide Recordings)1994
This Foundation E.P. (Exit Records) 1995
Some Part Sorrow CD (Exit Records) 1996
Some Part Hope: Discography (Motherbox Records) 2009

== Members ==
(1994-1997)
Bass: Dave Allen
Guitar: Jason May
Drums: Pete Ruland
Vocals: Scott Jarzombek

(1994)
Dave Allen: Bass
Austin Macdonald: Guitar
Jason May: Guitar
Pete Ruland: Drums
Scott Jarzombek: Vocals

(1993)
Rory: Guitar
Austin Macdonald: Bass
Jeff Fabb: Drums
Vocals: Scott Jarzombek
