= Up Front (hardcore band) =

American hardcore band

- Origin: New York City, U.S.
- Genres: Hardcore punk
- Years active: 1987–1992, 1997–1999
- Labels: Smorgasbord, New Age, Sober Mind,
- Website: up-front.org

Up Front was an American hardcore band from New York City. They were an influential part of the late 1980s New York hardcore and Connecticut straight edge scenes. They played many of their early shows at the now famous Anthrax Club in Norwalk, Connecticut. In 1987 they appeared on the X Marks The Spot compilation 7-inch, one of the first documents of the burgeoning Connecticut straight edge scene.

In 1988, they released their Spirit LP, and a summer tour followed in 1989 with Unit Pride, Insted and Gorilla Biscuits. Up Front remained active through 1992, releasing the Daybreak 7 inch in 1990, touring the US again in the summer of 1991, and completing their first tour of Europe in the winter of 1991–1992.

They initially broke up after recording the Changes 7-inch in 1992, but reformed in the spring of 1994 to record the What Fire Does 7-inch followed with their second tour of Europe that summer.

After a brief hiatus Up Front wrote and recorded the Movement CD in 1997. After a handful of US shows, a tour of Japan in 1998, and their third summer tour of Europe in 1999 followed (supporting a split 7-inch vinyl with Belgian hardcore band Building, released through Sober Mind Records).

Other than three "reunion" shows in the summer/fall of 2005, and one "reunion" show with a return to the Daybreak lineup in November 2009 at the A Time We'll Remember Fest, the band has remained dormant since 1999.

== Band members ==
- Steve Keeley – vocals
- Jon Field – guitar
- Rich Ryder – guitar
- Jeff Terranova – bass
- Tim Schmoyer – drums

=== Former members ===
- Dan Pettit – drums (1987)
- Jim Eaton – drums (1988–1989)
- Roger Lambert – vocals (1989)
- Ari Katz – drums (1989)

== Discography ==
- X Marks the Spot – 7 inch, 1988
- Spirit – CD, 1988
- Daybreak – 7 inch, 1990
- Changes – 7 inch, 1992
- What Fire Does – 7 inch, 1994
- Doin' It Live on WNYU – 7 inch, 1997
- Movement – CD, 1997
- Split w/ Building – 7 inch, 1999
- Five by Seven – CD, 2004
