= 25 ta Life =

American New York hardcore band

- Origin: New York City, U.S.
- Genres: Beatdown hardcore
- Years active: 1991–present
- Labels: Back ta Basics, Striving for Togetherness, We Bite, Triple Crown, Good Life, The Age of Venus, Superhero
- Members: Jay Way; Fred Mesk; Rob Rosario; Harry Minas; Warren Lee
- Past members: Rick Healey; Seth Franklin Meyer; Mike 141; Stikman; Simon Doucet; Ezra Vanbuskirk; Erwan Herry; Goulax; Dave Urban; Steve Pettit; Frank Smarra; Sxe Shawn; Jskamz; Steve Lowlife; Erock; Scott Bartley; Trey Tree

25 ta Life is an American New York hardcore band that originally formed in mid-1991.

== History ==
The band was started by Frank Smarra (bass) and Harry Minas (drums) in Astoria, Queens, New York City. They were soon joined by Fred Mesk (guitar) and together wrote most of the material that would be on their early releases.

In early 1992, they recruited former Agnostic Front roadie Rick Healey who added the lyrics to all the songs. They adopted the name after it was suggested by Freddy Cricien from Madball that also helped by giving them guest appearances at the end of its sets. 25 ta Life played their first full show at Studio 1, New Jersey on May 10, 1993, supporting Obituary. After a few failed attempts to add a second guitar player, Steve Pettit (formally of Dmize) joined the band in late 1993. In January 1994, bassist and co-founding member Frank left the band due to family commitments and was replaced by Warren Lee from Out of Line Queens. Steve was later replaced by his partner in Dmize: Beto Rosario. The band continued to play a large number of shows in the tri-state area and up and down the East Coast. In early 1996, 25 ta Life travelled to Europe, playing in France, Italy, Germany, Austria, Belgium, and Poland for the first time. By late 1996, co-founding member Harry left the band and was replaced by Seth Meyer from One 4 One.

25 ta Life opened for Agnostic Front's reunion show at the Wetlands in December 1996 and then played all of AF's East Coast dates along with Madball, Hatebreed and H_{2}O in early 1997. They went to Japan in April 1997. Warren and Beto left in May 1997 after the West Coast tour. Mike H from One 4 One joined on bass in June 1997 and they went to Europe in July 1997. They recorded "Strength Through Unity..." in July 1997, writing half of it on the spot. "Loyal ta the Grave", featuring Freddy (Madball) and Lord Ezec (Crown of Thornz, Skarhead), was written and recorded in less than an hour. Mike left in August 1997 and was replaced by Dave Urban from Faction Zero. Later that month, they went to Puerto Rico and recorded two songs for the second "New York's Hardest" compilation. In October–November 1997, Biohazard took 25 ta Life on a short eight-show tour of the East Coast from Washington, D.C., to Boston. Seth left the band in February 1998 and was replaced by Rob Pallotta. The band recorded its first full-length album "Friendship, Loyalty, Commitment" in 1999. After years of touring, the band broke up in late 2000.

Rick reformed the band in 2002 with all new members. They released several albums with different lineups over the next few years. The band eventually stopped releasing new albums and playing shows as rumors of Rick's mental illness began to spread.

In 2017, Fred Mesk, Seth Meyer, Beto and Mike 141 reformed the band with Stikman from Fury of Five on vocals. They performed at This is Hardcore fest in Philadelphia on July 29, 2017. They also announced on their Facebook page that they are working on new material. In March 2018, 25 ta Life released three new songs (Hunting Season EP) online. They also went on a short European tour which included headlining the sold out Superbowl of Hardcore in Rennes, France.

In February 2024, they announced via Instagram a new lineup, consisting of former drummer Harry Minas, Warren Lee, Fred Mesk and Rob Rosario. Later it was announced that Jay Way, from New Jersey hardcore band Bayway and Shattered Realm will take the vocal duties. New music is on the way and is expected in 2025.

== Influences ==
The band have cited influences including Bulldoze, Biohazard, Crown of Thornz, Madball, Agnostic Front, Merauder, the Bad Brains, Cro-Mags, Negative Approach and Leeway.

== Members ==
Current members

- Jay Way – vocals
- Harry Minas – drums
- Fred Mesk – rhythm guitar
- Warren Lee – bass
- Rob "Beto" Rosario – lead guitar

Former members

- Rick "Rick ta Life" – vocals
- James "Stikman" Ismean - vocals
- Goulax – guitars
- Steve Pettit – guitars
- Mark da Fist – guitars
- Shawn – guitars
- Ezra van Buskirk – guitars
- Chris Manning – guitars
- Jackson "Ta Life" Bunz - guitars
- Frank Smarra – bass
- Dave Urban – bass
- Loco Matt – bass
- Erick Hernández – bass
- Chumley – bass
- Dobro Hristov – bass
- Mike "141" Heinzer – bass
- Erwan Herry – bass
- Mike Maher - bass
- Simon Doucet – drums
- Scott Bartley – drums
- Rob Pallotta – drums
- Justin Skamz Strickland – drums
- Justin The Jew – drums
- Pete DeRosso – drums
- Seth Meyer – drums
- JM- bass

== Discography ==
=== Studio albums ===
Year	Title	Label
1999	Friendship, Loyalty, Commitment	Triple Crown, Good Life
2005	Hellbound, Misery, Torment	The Age of Venus
2009	Strength, Integrity, Brotherhood	Back ta Basics

=== EPs ===
Year	Title	Label
1993	Demo	Back ta Basics
1994	Twenty-five ta Life	Striving for Togetherness
1995	Keepin' It Real	We Bite
1997	Strength Through Unity. The Spirit Remains	Triple Crown
2003	Best of Friends/Enemies	The Age of Venus
2006	Fallen Angel	Superhero
2018	Hunting Season	Self-released

=== Splits ===
Year	Title or label	With
1995	Separate Ways...	DWF
1996	Hardcore Pride	Falling Down, Comin' Correct
1997	Make It Work	Skarhead
1997	Where It Begins	Morning Again
1998	Let the Past Be the Past...	Spazz
1999	Never Tear Us Apart	Slang
2005	Hellbound	Last Hope
2006	Rock Vegas	Cut Throat
2007	Scorpion	In Search Of
2008	Hate Unit	Russian Roulette
2009	Hardcore Trooper	Tromatized Youth

=== Live album ===
Year	Title	Label
2004	Live at Few da Real	Back ta Basics

=== Compilations ===
Year	Title	Label
2004	Haterz, Be Damned	Back ta Basics
2006	Early Dayz	Back ta Basics
2008	Forever True, Represent	Back ta Basics
