= Deathkiller =

American hardcore band

- Origin: Stamford, Connecticut, United States
- Genre: Hardcore punk
- Years active: 2006 – 2008
- Label: I Scream Records
- Members: Matt McIntosh; Christina Chiaramonte; Anthony Realbuto
- Past members: Ian McFarland

Deathkiller was an American hardcore band based in Stamford, Connecticut, United States. The trio, who formed in spring 2006 and signed with I Scream Records shortly thereafter, released their first album New England is Sinking on April 24, 2007. Their songs featured socially/politically conscious themes and effective merging of classic and contemporary hardcore-punk sensibilities.

== Members ==
Deathkiller featured singer/guitarist Matt McIntosh, bassist Christina Chiaramonte and drummer Anthony Realbuto. In January 2007, longtime friend Ian McFarland of Boston hardcore quartet, Blood for Blood assumed bass duties while Chiaramonte took an extended hiatus for undisclosed reasons. Chiaramonte returned to the band in August 2007.

== History ==
Deathkiller played their final show in the winter of 2008.

In a 2010 interview with Vista Fanzine, McIntosh stated that he felt that the band had run its course and that their message was specific to the Bush era.

== Reception ==
Following the circulation of their 2006 demo, the UK's Terrorizer magazine referred to Deathkiller as "Taking the timeless, yet simplistic fury of Black Flag and cranking the energy levels up way beyond human tolerance."

== Discography ==
Album title
New England Is Sinking
- Released: April 24, 2007
- Label: I Scream Records
