= No Redeeming Social Value =

American hardcore punk band

- Also known as: NRSV
- Origin: New York City, New York, U.S.
- Genre: Tough guy hardcore
- Years active: 1988–present
- Labels: Grapes Of Wrath, Desperate Records, SFT Records, Triple Crown Records, Dead City Records
- Website: www.nrsv.com

No Redeeming Social Value, also known as NRSV, is an American hardcore punk band. The band was started in 1988 by the brothers D Thrilla and K9 the sonic Maximizer of the Queens Village neighborhood of New York City. Alcohol, marijuana and parties are major themes in the group's music.

== History ==
The group was formed primarily to play a battle of the bands at the local Queens Village church Our Lady of Lourdes in 1988. Most songs were jokes and paid tribute to the legendary local bands Norman Bates and the Showerheads and Six and Violence. After a surprising turnout and mass appeal they decided to continue to play locally and record demo tapes and 7-inch records. At this point they acquired drummer Vinnie Value, second vocalist Mike Dixon and bassist Scott Cumbo to replace the members who left the original line-up. No Redeeming Social Value had a run on the local Queens Heavy Metal circuit in the late 1980s and early 1990s. Eventually, with the help of the Lower East Side band Warzone (band) and local punk DJ Johnny Stiff, they began to play many hardcore punk matinee shows in Manhattan. The band's first LP release Rocks the Party on SFT Records led to opportunities for national and international tours. No Redeeming Social Value currently plays shows sporadically throughout the year.

The band is featured in the hardcore punk documentary N.Y.H.C.. The band's song "Clueless" is used in the video game Backyard Wrestling 2: There Goes the Neighborhood.

=== Members ===
==== Current ====
- D Thrilla, stage name Major Damage, voice
- K9 the Sonic Maximizer stage name K-Love, guitars
- John Franko, bass
- Glen Lorieo, stage name Seeweed, beats
- Dick Van Butlett, Olde English bottle

==== Former ====
- Mike Dixon, second vocals and spiritual advisor
- Vinnie Value, percussion
- Scott Cumbo, bass
- Pete "the Meat" Larussa, drums
- Big Bud, blunt tech
- Insane James, drums
- Rich Hoak (of Brutal Truth), drums
- Kevin Gill, Occasional Vocals

== Discography ==
- No Redeeming Social Value demo
- Negative Image 7-inch
- N.Y.H.C. (1996)
- Three Way Dance (1998)
- THC (1999)
- Hardcore Your Lousy Ass Off (2000) 7-inch
- 40 Oz. of Hardcore (2001) LP
- Still Drinking (2007) LP
- High in Holland LP
- Skinheads Rule 7-inch
- Rocks the Party (1997) LP
- Drunken Chicken Style EP
- America's Favorite Hardcore Band EP
- Wasted for Life (2020)
