= Icepick (band) =

American metalcore band

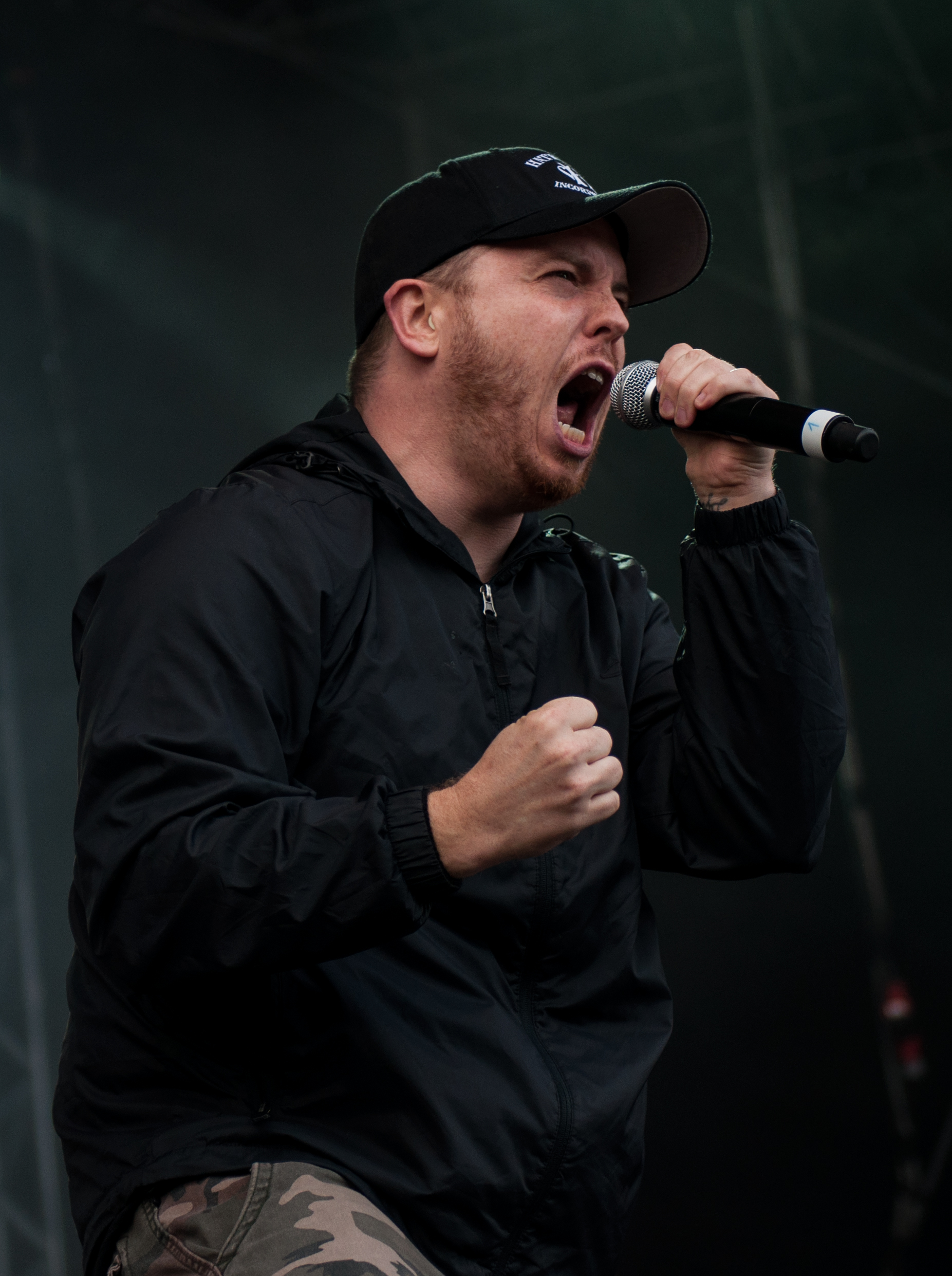
- Frontman Jamey Jasta performing in 2014

Background information
- Origin: West Haven, Connecticut, U.S.
- Genres: Metalcore, tough guy hardcore
- Years active: 1996–present
- Label: Stillborn
- Spinoff of: Hatebreed; Crown of Thornz
- Members: Jamey Jasta; Danny Diablo; Derek Kerswill; Wayne Lozinak; Frank Novinec
- Website: icepickhardcore.com

Icepick is an American metalcore band formed in 1996. It serves as a side project to Jamey Jasta of Hatebreed, Danny Diablo, and other musicians of the hardcore punk and hip hop scenes. Although founded in 1996, Icepick remained virtually stagnant until the song "Born to Crush You" appeared on UFC: Ultimate Beat Downs, Vol. 1 in August 2004. Former UFC heavyweight champion Andrei Arlovski frequently uses their song "Onward to Victory" as his entrance music for fights.

Icepick's debut album, Violent Epiphany, was released on April 18, 2006, under Jasta's record label, Stillborn Records. It features guest vocals by musicians including Ice-T, Roger Miret, Freddy Cricien, Al Barr, Paul Bearer of Sheer Terror, and Pete Morcey of 100 Demons. Wrote Allmusic, the album "is exactly what you'd expect from a Jasta-Ezec union -- spit-flying, angsty hollering and riffs that alternate between ragingly fast and grindingly slow."

== Band members ==
- Jamey Jasta – vocals
- Danny Diablo – vocals
- Wayne Lozinak – lead guitar
- Frank Novinec – rhythm guitar
- Derek Kerswill – drums

== Discography ==
- Violent Epiphany (2006)

No.	Title	Length
1.	"Devotion Measures Strength"	2:14
2.	"Bitter Twisted Memory"	2:44
3.	"Tomorrow Is Not a Promise"	2:53
4.	"Violent Epiphany"	2:25
5.	"Creations of Chaos"	2:33
6.	"With One Ideal"	2:48
7.	"Show of Force"	2:23
8.	"This Can Never Be Undone"	2:30
9.	"Nothing Without Loyalty"	2:53
10.	"Real Recognizes Real"	3:59
11.	"Onward to Victory"	2:04
12.	"Born to Crush You"	3:21
