= Crown of Thornz =

Hardcore punk band

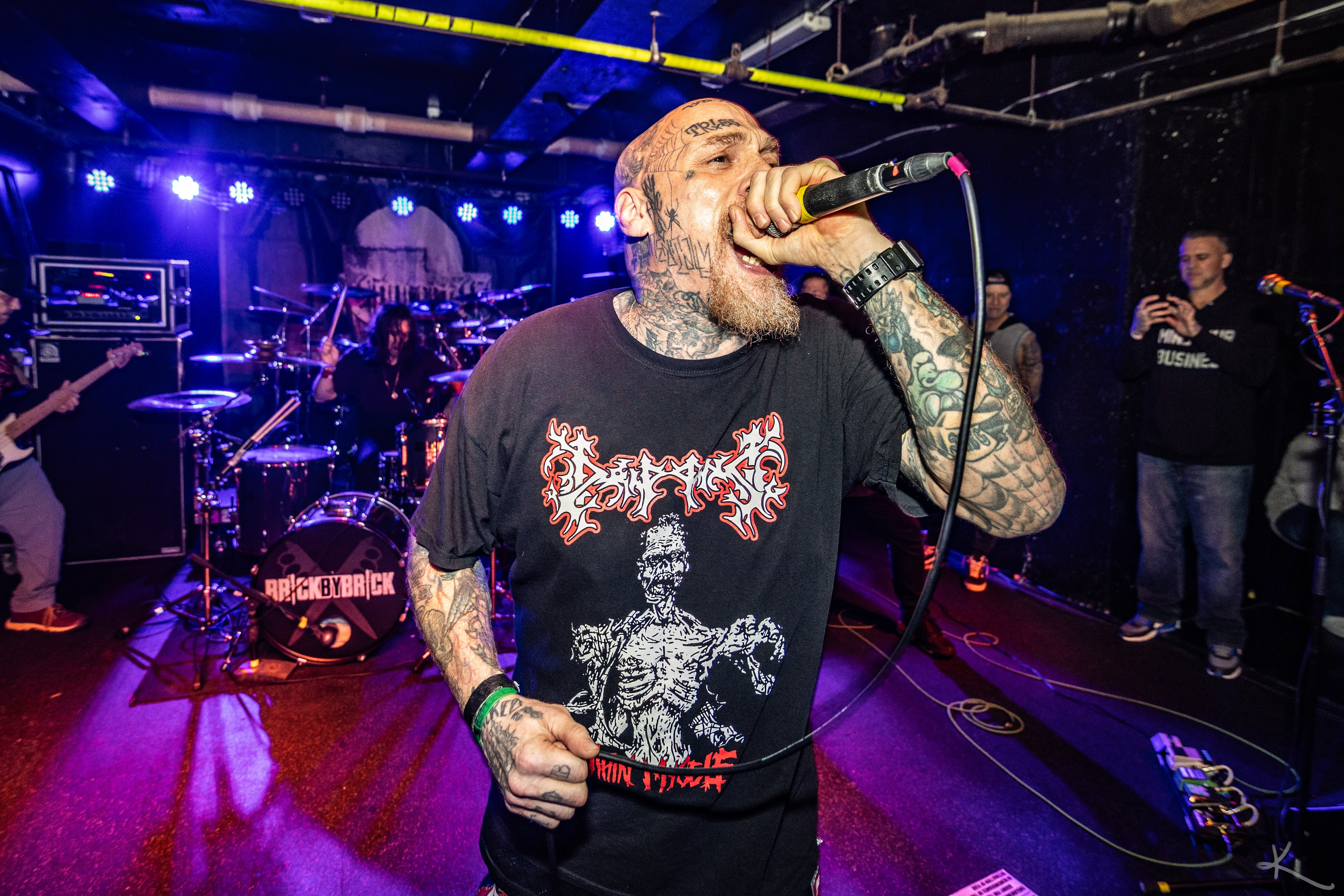
- Lead singer Danny Diablo

Background information
- Origin: New York City, New York, U.S.
- Genres: Tough guy hardcore; melodic hardcore; beatdown hardcore
- Years active: 1994–1998, 2012–present
- Labels: Equal Vision, Another Planet, Bridge Nine, Durty Mick
- Spinoffs: Skarhead; Icepick
- Members: Danny Diablo; Mike Dijan; Dimi Douvas; Paul Delaney
- Past members: Franklin Rhi; Marcos "Jere" Rodriguez; Steve O'Brien; Eric "Goat" Arce; Matthew Mangiaracina; A.K.Ray; Rigg Ross; Brett Evans; Brian Daniels

Crown of Thornz are a hardcore punk band, formed in New York City in 1994. By their 1998 disbandment, they were one of the most prominent groups in New York hardcore. They released only one EP, Train Yard Blues (1995); one studio album, Mentally Vexed (1996); and one split single with Aggressive Dogs (1998). Following their 2012 reunion, they have release the two track single Nothing But Tragedy.

== History ==
When Diablo decided to form a band in 1994, he recruited Franklin Rhi, who at the time was playing bass for 108. Diablo then decided to audition five guitar plays simultaneously, having Merauder and Dmize vocalist Marcos "Jere" Rodriguez sit in on drums. However, Rhi, Rodriguez and Diablo were unimpressed by the guitar players. In response, Rhi called Mike Dijan, former guitarist of Breakdown and asked him to come to the rehearsal space and play to help improve the situation. When Dijan arrived he began to play with Rhi, Rodriguez and Diablo, and soon the five auditionees put down their guitars and watched as they wrote the song that would become the Crown of Thornz song "Mental Masquerade". After this, Diablo informed Dijan that he was now a part of the band, and they recruited Dimi Douvas of Dmize to be a permanent drummer, and began to rehearse in his basement. After two months, the band had only written two songs, however Diablo informed them that he had booked them to soon open for Killing Time at the Grant. This led to the band beginning to rehearse every day, during which time they wrote the entirety of the Train Yard Blues EP.

The name "Crown of Thorns" was derived from when Diablo was eating a thornback guitarfish in sushi, and decided he wanted to name the band something including the word "thorns". He decided on a play on Jesus' crown of thorns thinking it would be ironic because of his Jewish faith. Train Yard Blues was released in 1995 through Equal Vision Records, by which time Rhi had been replaced by Steve O'Brien. The following year, they released their debut album Mentally Vexed through Another Planet Records. In 1998, they released a split single with Aggressive Dogs, then disbanded by the end of the year.

On April 23, 2006, the band reunited to play at The SuperBowl of Hardcore marking their first live performance in eight years. The group returned once again in 2009, to play at that years Black N Blue Bowl.

In 2012, the band began sporadically playing live shows again going on short tours and making festival appearances. Between June 11 and 23, 2013, they toured the United States supporting Rancid, alongside the Transplants. They performed at United Blood Festival 2015, which took place on May 17. On August 14, 2015, they released the two track single "Nothing But Tragedy", with Diablo on vocals, Matthew Mangiaracina on guitar and Rigg Ross on drums. Throughout March 2016, Crown of Thornz supported Madball on that years Rebllion tour in Europe. They once again took part in the Black N Blue Bowl on May 19, 2018.

Between May 5 and September 24, 2022, they toured the United States supporting Sick of It All and Agnostic Front as co-headliners. They performed at FYA Festival 9, which took place January 7 and 8, 2023. On January 28 and 29, 2023, they opened for Trapped Under Ice in New York alongside Bulldoze and Pain of Truth. On April 29, 2023, they performed at Tompkins Square Park alongside Madball and Murphy's Law. On November 23, 2024, they performed at Irving Plaza, alongside Killing Time and Vision of Disorder to raise money for Sick of It All vocalist Lou Koller and his battle with esophageal cancer.

In 2026, the band supported Angel Dust on select dates of their US tour.

== Musical style and legacy ==
Crown of Thornz played a mid-tempo style of hardcore punk which put an emphasis on rhythm and made use of emotional vocals and lyrics. They drew on the influence of the Cro-Mags and Agnostic Front's crossover thrash eras. Original guitarist Mike Dijan cited his influences on the band as the Cro-Mags's 1992 album Alpha Omega, Slayer and the genres of darkwave and punk rock. PopMatters writer Ethan Stewart cited Crown of Thornz as a part of a movement of tough guy hardcore bands who began incorporating elements of alternative metal in the 1990s. Following their reunion, they began to incorporate elements of metalcore. Critics have categorized their music as beatdown hardcore, tough guy hardcore and melodic hardcore.

They have been cited as influence by bands including Higher Power, Never Ending Game, Regulate, Trapped Under Ice, and Joey Chiaramonte of Koyo, in addition to being covered by Narrow Head.

== Members ==
Current

- Danny Diablo – vocals (1994–1998, 2012–present)
- Mike Dijan – guitar (1994–1998, 2017–present)
- Dimi Douvas – drums (1994–1997, 2013, 2017–present)
- Paul Delaney – bass (2021–present)

Former

- Franklin Rhi – bass (1994–1995)
- Marcos "Jere" Rodriguez – drums (1994)
- Steve O'Brien – bass (1995–1998)
- Eric "Goat" Arce – drums (1997-1998)
- Matthew Mangiaracina – guitar (2012–2017)
- Rigg Ross – drums (2012–2017)
- Brett Evans – bass (2012–2021)
- Brian Daniels – guitar (2012–2021)

== Discography ==
Albums

- Mentally Vexed (1996)

EPs

- Train Yard Blues (1995)

Singles

- Crown of Thornz / Aggressive Dogs (1998, split single with Aggressive Dogs)
- Nothing But Tragedy (2015)
