= Subzero (band) =

American punk/metal band

- Origin: New York City, U.S.
- Genres: Crossover thrash, punk metal, NYHC, hardcore punk
- Years active: 1989–2009, 2011–present
- Labels: Upstate, Demons Run Amok, Stillborn, Century Media, Inner Journey
- Members: Lou di Bella; Rich Kennon; Larry Susi; Matt Mangiaracina; Rigg Ross
- Past members: Javier Carpio (aka SOB); Anthony Schiavo; Jim Eaton; Tim o'Reilly; Jason Kalfin; Larry "The Hunter" Nieroda; Brian "Mitts" Daniels; Joe Capizzi; John Bryan; Mark Levy; Walter "Monsta" Ryan; Eddie Ortiz

Subzero is a New York hardcore / punk metal band that was formed in 1989.

== History ==
The band was created by Rich Kennon of NYHC band Breakdown and Jim Eaton of the New York-based straight edge band Up Front. After hooking up with singer Lou di Bella and bassist Larry Susi who had played in various local bands in the New York area together, Subzero was finalized. Subzero is one of the longest active bands in the New York hardcore scene, despite a period of inactivity in the late 1990s due to singer Lou di Bella's bout with acute lymphoblastic leukemia. He claims his harrowing experiences while in the hospital and numerous brushes with death have made him into a stronger person, evidenced by the lyrics to their song "Lionhearted", as well as a tongue-in-cheek tattoo across his sternum reading "Cancer killah". The song Lionhearted, from the 2005 Stillborn Records release, The Suffering of Man, earned a music video which debuted on MTV's "Headbangers Ball" and drew in close to one million views on YouTube. The song has become a staple anthem in the bands live set. Subzero have toured the world many times over as headliners and as a support group under national acts as well. They have shared the stages with an array of prominent acts such as Slayer, Hatebreed, Megadeth, Motörhead, The Misfits, Sick of It All, Rancid, Cro-mags, Killswitch Engage, Napalm Death, Iron Maiden, Cannibal Corpse, Eminem and others. They have headlined every major club in Japan, played all the major festivals in Europe. They were one of the first 5 American hardcore bands to ever tour Japan to sold-out audiences. Subzero retains their underground ethics and frequently play small clubs, basements and dive bars.

On September 25, 2020, Subzero released a new digital single entitled, "House of Grief" which will appear on the A side of a two-song vinyl 7" to be released on October 30 under Upstate Records (USA) Demons Run Amok (EU). A 6-song EP entitled "Beauty in Sorrow" is scheduled to be released in winter 2020 under Upstate Records/Demons Run Amok as well.

=== Breakup/Reformation ===
On Sunday February 9, 2009, the band announced that they would be breaking up after "Black n' Blue Bowl 2009". In the fall of 2011 Subzero regrouped and have played an October show with the Cro-mags as well as completing a 12 date headlining tour of Japan with Aggressive Dogs aka Uzi-one.

== Critical reception ==
Decibel Magazine quoted (Sept 2020): "Subzero is one of the most unique, multi-dimensional, enlivening acts to ever grind its way out of the legendary New York hardcore scene, period. I don't think even longtime fans are prepared for the fury and awesomeness the band has harnessed in their recent 2020 sessions. Subzero has put the elements of its past work/evolutions together in a sharper, defter way than ever before and now returns, perhaps improbably, with some of the best material of its storied career.

Metal Maniacs magazine says of the band, "Subzero are one of the most significant forces to be reckoned with in New York hardcore...One of NY's most promising and powerful Hardcore/Metal acts...This style of hardcore sounds like no other..Punctuated by seriously metallic and almost artsy moments."

Maximumrocknroll describes them as "A very powerful package of New York hardcore here but with more intelligence musically and lyrically."

Terrorizer magazine suggests, "Subzero are thoroughly distraught with genuine NYHC rage, but are quite diverse in their musical ethics".

== Covers ==
- Subzero's original song, "Boxed In" from the album 'Happiness Without Peace' (originally from the 1990, 2 song promo) was covered by Hatebreed on their album For the Lions.
- "Boxed In" has also been covered by the band Terror on the Century Media Records's 2CD compilation "Covering 20 Years Of Extremes".

== Discography ==
- House of Grief single – Upstate Records – 2020
- NYJP Split w/Facecarz – 2006
- The Suffering of Man – Stillborn Records – 2005
- Necropolis EP – Stillborn Records – 2004
- The Smiths Tribute album – "The World Still Won't Listen" song "What Difference Does it Make" – Too Damn Hype Records – 1996
- Happiness Without Peace LP – Too Damn Hype Records – 1996
- Happiness Without Peace re-issue (remixed/remastered) by Tom Soares at Normandy Sound – 1997 Century Media Records
- 1993 "Giger Demo" demo - self released – 1993
- Ice Age 7" – Inner Journey Records – 1991
- 1990 2 song promo – self-released – 1990
