= Skarhead =

American hardcore punk band

- Origin: New York City, U.S.
- Genres: Beatdown hardcore; Heavy hardcore; Hardcore Punk
- Years active: 1995–present
- Labels: Another Planet; Victory; Reality; I Scream; Force 5
- Members: Dan Singer; A.K. Ray; Puerto Rican Myke
- Past members: Aaron "White Owl" Collins; Brian "Mitts" Daniels; Eric "Goat" Arce; Hoya Roc; Rigg Ross; Don Capria; Kevin Thorne

Skarhead is an American hardcore punk band from New York City, founded and fronted by Lord Ezec a.k.a. Danny Diablo (of Crown of Thornz). The group is considered the originators of thugcore music, a subgenre of hardcore punk "full of relentless breakdowns and throwdown-ready posturing". They have toured with Gwar, Hatebreed, and Earth Crisis. They have been cited as an influence by Deez Nuts and Fucked Up.

== Members ==
- Dan Singer (of Crown of Thornz) – lead vocals
- White Owl (formerly of White Trash) – bass
- Mitts (from Madball) – guitar
- Goat (from Murphy's Law & Misfits) – drums
- Hoya Roc (from Madball) – guitar
- Puerto Rican Mike (from District 9) – vocals
- A.K.Ray (from Vietnom, Northern Hit Squad ) – guitars
- Kevin Thorne (from Bulldoze) – guitars
- Rigg Ross (from Madball and Hatebreed) – drums

== Discography ==
1995	Drugs, Money, Sex. (6-track EP)	Another Planet Records
1998	Kings at Crime	Victory Records
2009	Drugs, Music & Sex	I Scream Records
2010	Kickin' It Oldschool	Reality Records
2011	Dreams Don't Die!!!	I Scream Records
