= Vision of Disorder =

American metalcore band

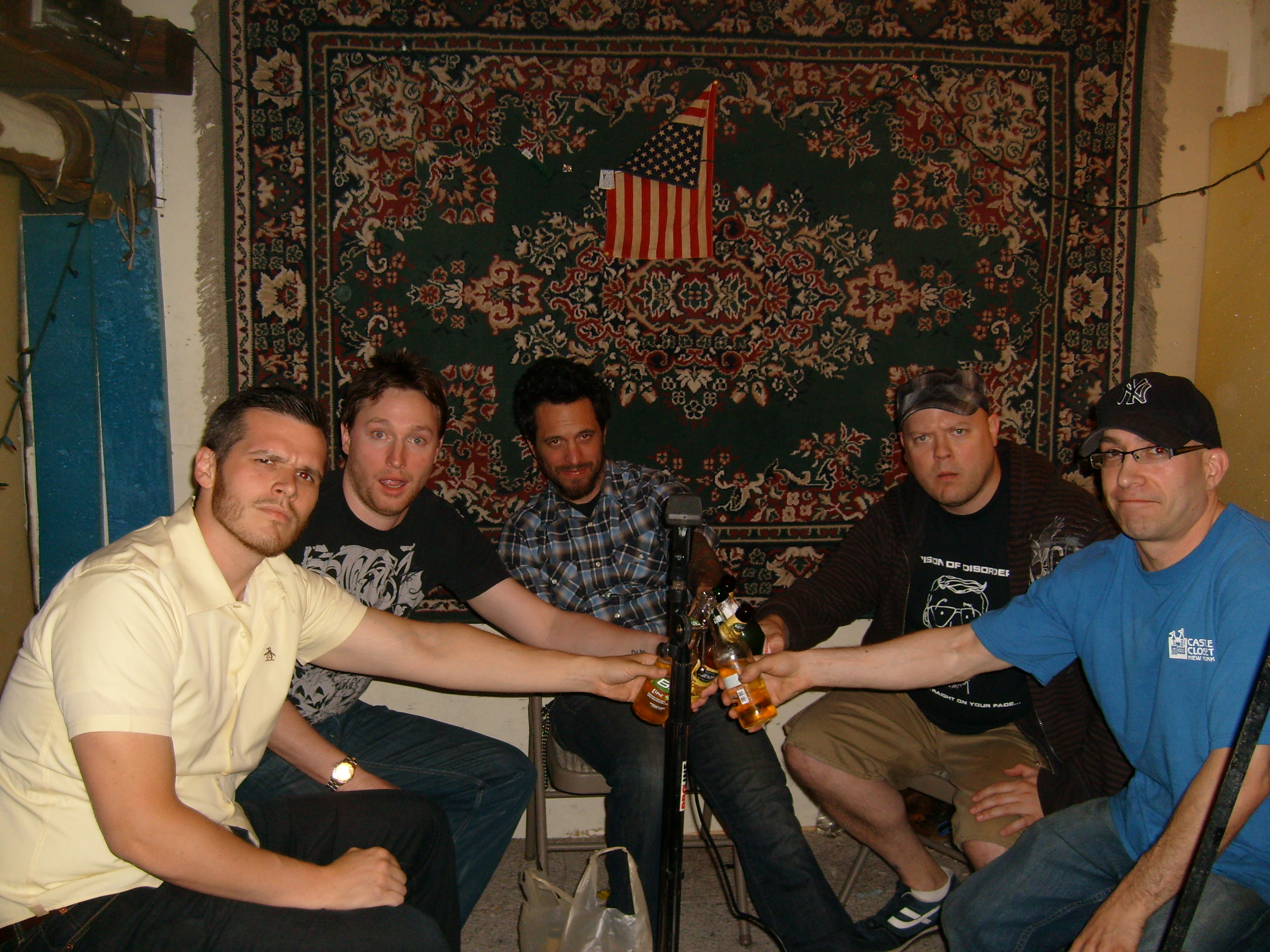
- Left to right: Mike Fleischmann, Mike Kennedy, Tim Williams, Matt Baumbach, Brendon Cohen (2008)

Background information
- Origin: Long Island, New York, U.S.
- Genres: Metalcore; alternative metal; groove metal; hardcore punk; heavy hardcore
- Works: Discography
- Years active: 1992–2002; 2006; 2008–present
- Labels: Striving for Togetherness; Supersoul; Roadrunner; Go-Kart; TVT; Music for Nations; Candlelight
- Spinoffs: Bloodsimple
- Members: Tim Williams; Mike Kennedy; Matt Baumbach; Mike Fleischmann; Brendon Cohen
- Past members: Josh Demarco; Jake

Vision of Disorder is an American metalcore band from Long Island, New York. Formed in 1992, the band released three albums before disbanding in 2002. They garnered attention for blending melody and groove into traditional hardcore, but their attempts to pursue an alternative metal direction on their fourth album met limited commercial success. The band reunited in 2008 and has since released two further albums, The Cursed Remain Cursed in 2012 and Razed to the Ground in 2015.

== History ==
Guitarists Matt Baumbach and Mike Kennedy formed the band in 1992 with vocalist/lyricist Tim Williams, drummer Brendon Cohen, and bassist Mike Fleischmann. Vision of Disorder released a series of demos and contributed to several compilations before releasing the Still EP in 1995 on Striving for Togetherness Records. The band appeared in the N.Y.H.C. documentary around that time. Vision of Disorder gained attention for incorporating different styles into its hardcore framework.

Vision of Disorder signed with Roadrunner Records' subsidiary Supersoul, and released its self-titled full-length debut in 1996. The band was praised for popularizing hardcore music. The debut album was "metallic hardcore that no one had heard, released for a mass audience on a big label. It had its merits; powerful, screamed vocals often layered over depressing clean vocals combined with fresh 'un-hardcore' guitar sections and unfamiliar drum patterns. For anyone into hardcore at the time, this was the album to have." Fleischmann departed Vision of Disorder after the album's recording, and was briefly replaced with a bassist called Jake. Williams said that Jake "was a good bass player, but was horrible for VOD", and he was fired following a tour with Madball. As a result, the band cancelled a tour with Godflesh. The band reconciled with Fleischmann and began touring in December 1996. The band took part in the 1997 Ozzfest Tour.

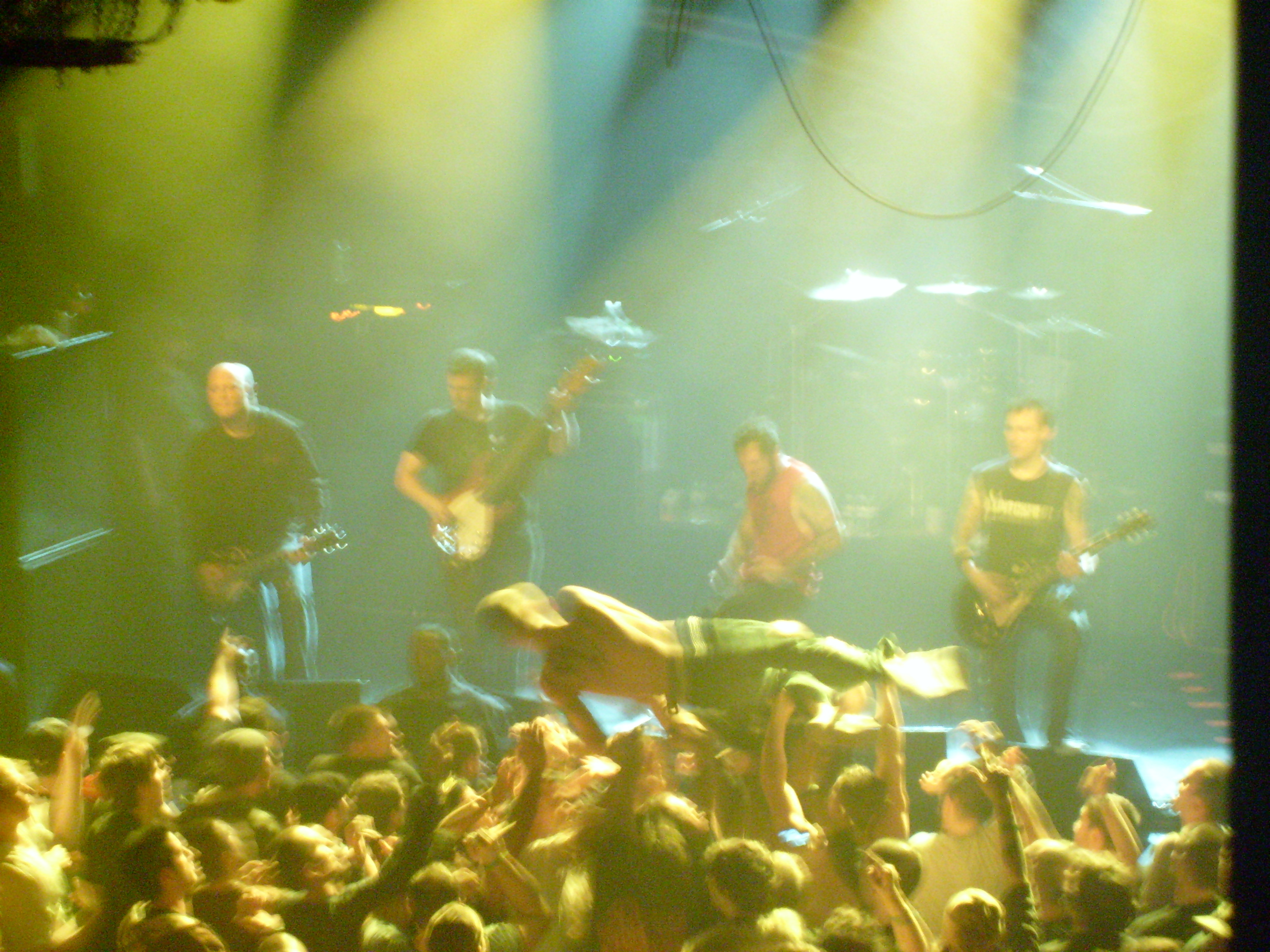
VOD live at Irving Plaza in New York City, 2008

Vision of Disorder's second album, Imprint, was released in 1998 on Roadrunner Records, and featured guest vocals by Pantera's Phil Anselmo on the song "By the River". The band was displeased with the production, which it attributed to the brief recording span. Vision of Disorder also disliked its label's purported lack of tour support. The band and label severed parted ways. Williams recalls,

Three years ago we were on Roadrunner and Imprint had just come out maybe two, three months ago and they weren't pushing us or doing anything...Roadrunner said "We're yanking your tour support, come home and make another record". But we wanted to go out and support Imprint and just felt insulted that they said that. So we said "Something is going on here, we're getting the fuck off of this label"...We want[ed] to go back to being a hardcore band and playing weekends and they tried to offer us money and a better deal but we were like "Nope, see you".

After the label strife, Vision of Disorder kept a low profile. They returned in 1999 with For the Bleeders, consisting mostly of re-recorded demo songs, released on Go-Kart Records.

In 2001, Vision of Disorder released From Bliss to Devastation on TVT Records. The album shifted towards a traditional verse-chorus-verse structure. Kennedy described the album as "fitting in with the nu-metal scene" while Williams praised the band's songwriting approach:

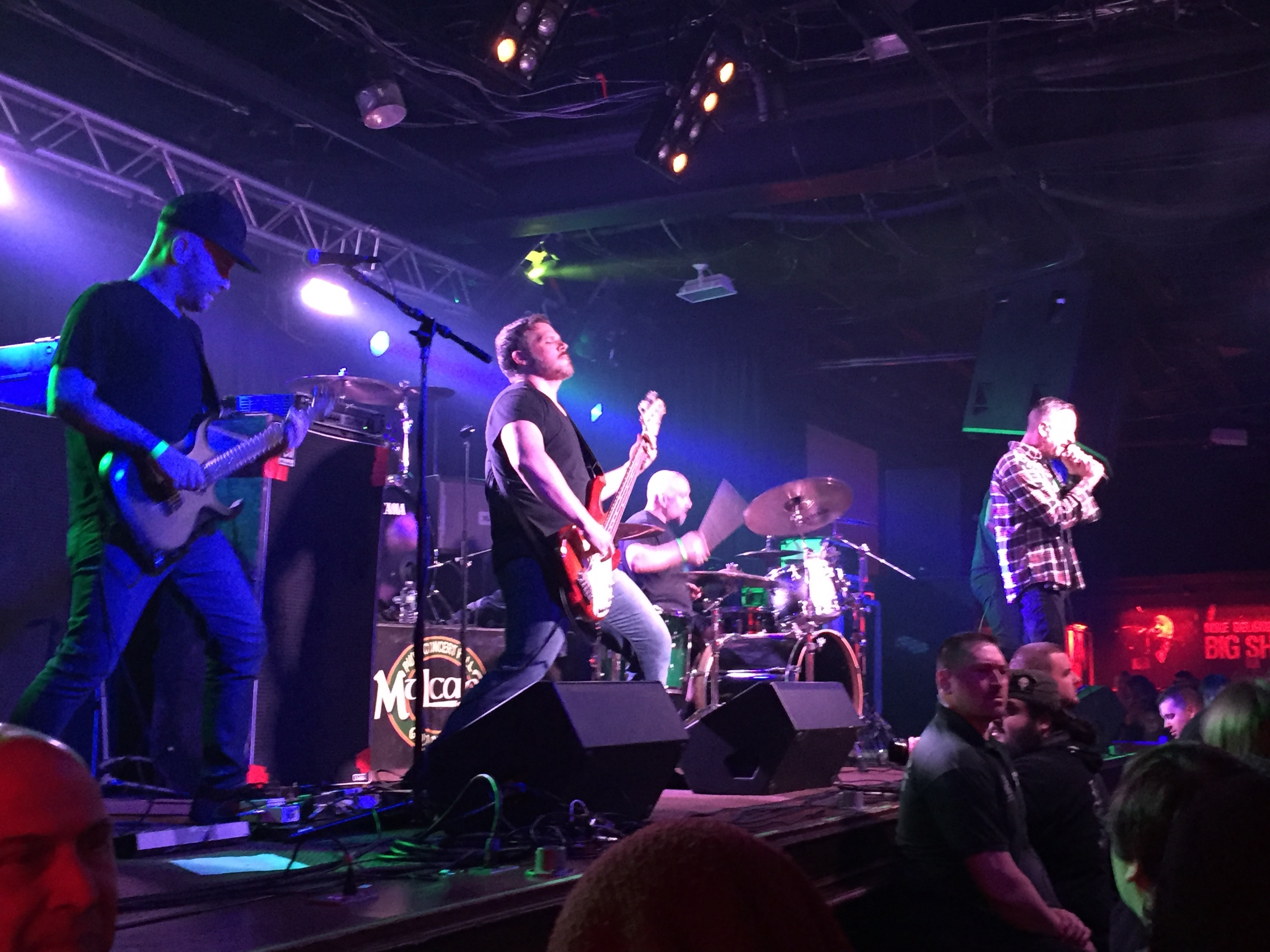
VOD live at Mulcahys in 2017 (Josh Demarco, Mike Fleischmann, Brendon Cohen, and Tim Williams; Mike Kennedy not visible)

The songwriting is much more stuck to the classic boundaries of songwriting as far as a verse and chorus. Before we had no respect for songwriting and that was our style and we liked that. But now we are getting older and we want to be able to make music that you can just sit back hit play and listen to it.

Reportedly frustrated by TVT's lack of support, Vision of Disorder went on hiatus and disbanded. Williams and Kennedy formed the band Bloodsimple while Cohen and Fleischmann played in Karvnov.

Vision of Disorder reunited briefly in order to play three songs during a show with Bloodsimple and Karnov. The band played several one-off shows and shot footage for a DVD before formally reuniting in October 2008. Williams described the material for the reunion album as similar to Imprint. While the album was ultimately delayed several times, in July 2011, the first single, "The Enemy", was released on Candlelight Records. On September 18, 2012, The Cursed Remain Cursed was released. The album was celebrated as "largely a return to the confrontational metallic hardcore that gave Imprint its cult following," although "some elements of From Bliss to Devastation...creep in on occasion".

Around this time Matt Baumbach left the band, and former Mind Over Matter and dayinthelife guitarist Josh Demarco took his place in the line-up. VOD's next album was released on November 27, 2015, 'Razed to the Ground', via Candlelight Records (and was produced by Zeuss). AXS contributor Terrance Pryor named the release one of the best metalcore records of 2015, calling it "a definite rager from start to finish".

== Band members ==
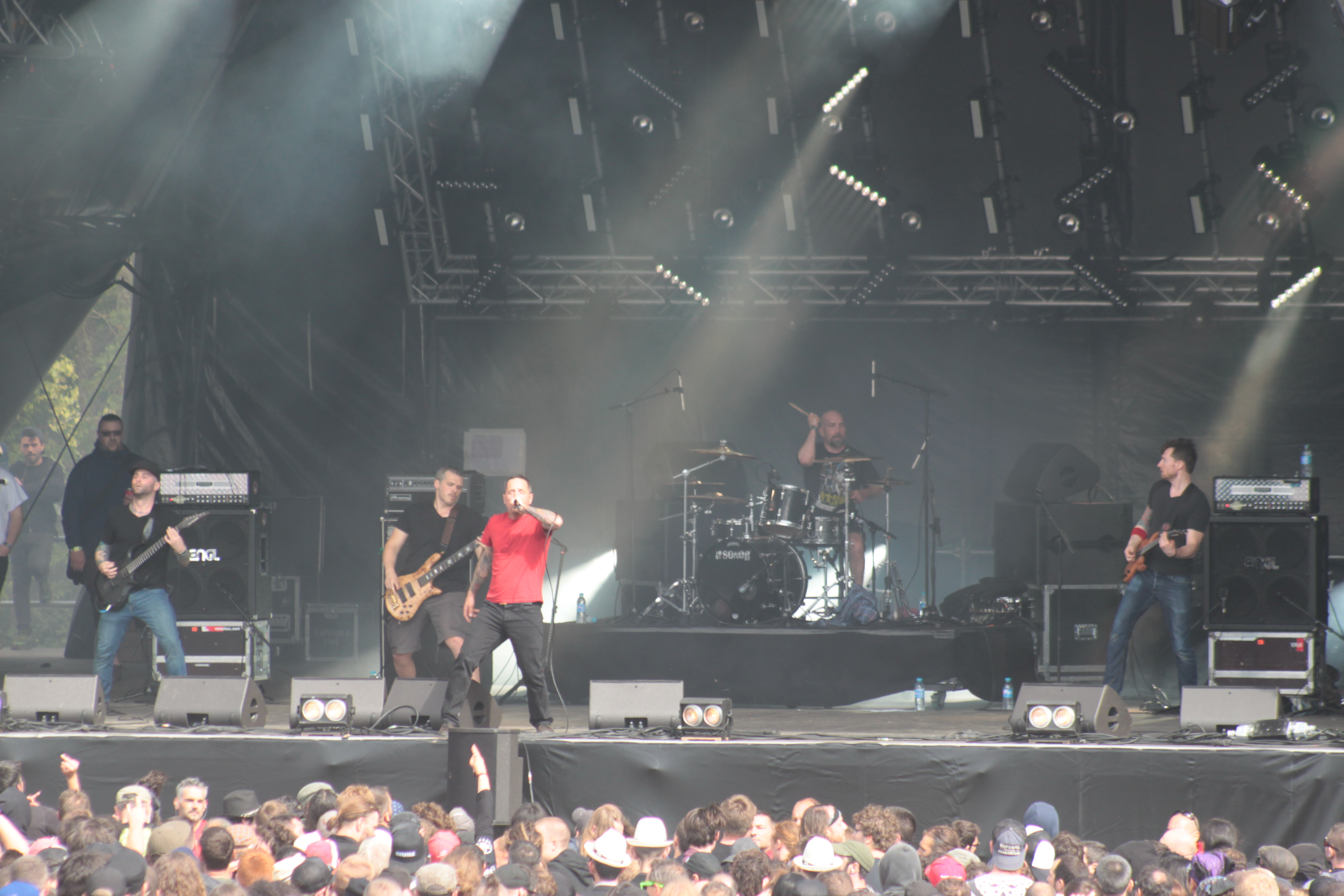
Vision of Disorder at Hellfest 2016

Current members

- Tim Williams − vocals (1992–2002, 2006, 2008–present)
- Mike Kennedy – guitar (1992–2002, 2006, 2008–present)
- Mike Fleischmann – bass guitar (1992–2002, 2006, 2008–present)
- Brendon Cohen – drums (1992–2002, 2006, 2008–present)
- Josh Demarco – guitar (2015–present)

Former members

- Matt Baumbach – guitar (1992–2002, 2006, 2008–2013)
- Jake – bass guitar (1996)

== Discography ==
=== Studio albums ===
List of studio albums, with selected chart positions and sales figures
| Title | Details | Peak chart positions | |
| Title | Details | US Heat. | UK |
|---|---|---|---|
| Vision of Disorder | Released: October 22, 1996; Label: Supersoul/Roadrunner; Format: CD, CS, LP | — | — |
| Imprint | Released: July 14, 1998; Label: Roadrunner; Format: CD, CS, LP | 10 | 197 |
| For the Bleeders | Released: August 24, 1999; Label: Go-Kart Records; Format: CD, LP | — | — |
| From Bliss to Devastation | Released: June 19, 2001; Label: TVT Records; Format: CD | — | — |
| The Cursed Remain Cursed | Released: September 18, 2012; Label: Candlelight; Format: CD, LP | 11 | — |
| Razed to the Ground | Released: November 27, 2015; Label: Candlelight; Format: CD, LP | — | — |
"—" denotes a recording that did not chart or was not released in that territory.

=== DVD ===
- Dead in NY (Koch Entertainment, 2008)

=== EPs ===
- Still (Striving for Togetherness Records, 1995)
- N.Y.H.C. Documentary Soundtrack (Striving for Togetherness Records, 1996)
- Resurrecting Reality (EP) (Crisis/Revelation Records 1998)

=== Demos ===
- Demo '93
- Demo '94 (The "Extra Shit" Demo)
- Demo '95

=== Miscellaneous ===
- Vision of Disorder/Loyal to None split 7-inch (Hearsay Records, 1994)
- Vision of Disorder/Loyal to None Live on WUSB Riptide Radio (split cassette, recorded live, 1994)
- Vision of Disorder Live on WUSB Riptide Radio (distributed on cassette tape, 1995)
- Vision of Disorder/Nanchaku - split 7-inch (Japanese Import) (Dea Records, 1997)
- Landslide/Twelve Steps to Nothing - split 7-inch w/ Dive, Uzamaki (Dea Records, 1999)
- What You Are/Jada Bloom - split 7-inch w/ Minor League, Wrongside (Dea Records, 1999)
