= The Icemen =

American hardcore punk band

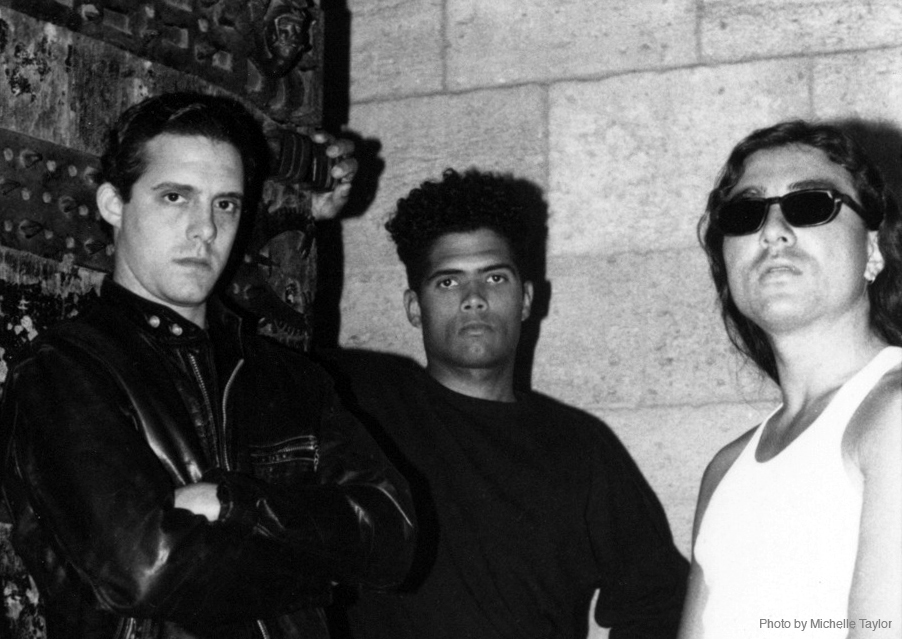
- The Icemen – original members: Marco Abularach, Noah Evans, Mackie Jayson

Background information
- Origin: New York City, U.S.
- Genres: Crossover thrash, hardcore punk, metalcore, thrash metal
- Years active: 1982–2013
- Labels: Blackout, Reaper
- Members: Marco Abularach; Noah Evans; Mackie Jayson
- Past members: John Gamble; Carl Demola
- Website: officialicemen.com

The Icemen are an American hardcore punk and metal band from New York City. The band was founded in late 1982 by guitarist and songwriter Marco Abularach. He was later joined by Noah Evans on bass guitar and Mackie Jayson (Bad Brains, Cro-Mags) on drums.

Abularach and Evans grew up together in the Westbeth Artists Community of New York's Greenwich Village, and shared a recording/rehearsal studio there – Studio 50 otherwise known as SD50. They met Mackie at The High School of Music & Art.

All of The Icemen's music and lyrics were written by Marco Abularach who, in addition, created all band related artwork. Most of their recordings were produced by Evans, who also has worked as producer and/or engineer as well as live sound for many other bands.

== History ==
=== Early years (1982–1985) ===
The Icemen played their first show at CBGB on April 11, 1983, a memorial for the late Patrick Mack of the Stimulators. For that one show, they had Miles Kelly on vocals (guitarist of Frontline).

Next, the Icemen turned to John Gamble on vocals. In 1984, they recorded a pair of songs ("The Iceman" & "You Let It Go to Your Head") and had hoped to release it as a 7" although that never happened. These tracks ended up being used primarily to get gigs. With this lineup (Abularach, Evans, Jayson, Gamble), the Icemen played shows through 1984 and 1985 in New York City mostly at CBGB and Pyramid Club. Sometime not long after that, Gamble was released from the band.

=== Nola years (1985–1987) ===
What followed was a period with the band unable to find a vocalist they would accept. They continued to write songs and record at Nola Penthouse Studio where Evans worked as an engineer. Located in the Steinway Building on 57th street New York, Evans worked in the classic 24-track analog studio, engineering and producing everything from jazz to commercial "jingles". During this time, the songs for the R.I.P. EP were written and early versions recorded.

=== Rest in Peace years (1987–1992) ===
It was 1987 when they finally settled for Carl DeMola (Griffin) and this would be the lineup best known to most. The Icemen would perform live shows through the next five years, often at CBGB, their "Home Base". In 1991, the Icemen released the R.I.P. EP on Blackout Records. This four-song EP contained the tracks "Rest in Peace", "Shadow Out of Time", "The Harsh Truth" and "No Guts No Glory". It was released on both CD and cassette. In addition, "Rest in Peace" and "The Harsh Truth" were released on 7", including a limited edition in blue or red vinyl. R.I.P. was the Icemen's only official release; no other material written by creator Marco Abularach and performed by original members Abularach, Evans, Jayson has ever been released. While the band continued to perform through 1992, frustration at lack of musical growth continued to mount and it would not be much longer before the Icemen would release vocalist Carl DeMola from their band. While they would search for a new vocalist for a period of time, this was essentially the end of the official Icemen.

=== Return of the Icemen and new release (2008) ===
In 2008, the Icemen returned. Having transferred all of their many original tape recordings from analog to digital, they released two formerly unreleased tracks: on Reaper Records a colored vinyl 7" featuring "The Iceman" – the first ever recording by the Icemen (1984 Nola Studios New York) – and "It'll Be Your Grave", another of their earliest recordings, one of several sessions they recorded at Nola Studios from 1984 to 1987.

=== Death of Demola ===
On December 27, 2013, vocalist Carl Edward Demola died at the age of 43 in Texas City, Texas, where he had lived since 2002.
