= List of beatdown hardcore bands =

This is a list of notable bands considered to be beatdown hardcore. Beatdown hardcore is a subgenre of hardcore punk that incorporates more music elements of heavy metal than traditional hardcore punk.

== List of bands ==
- 100 Demons
- 25 ta Life
- Alpha Wolf
- Born from Pain
- Brutality Will Prevail
- Bulldoze
- Bury Your Dead
- Cold as Life
- Crown of Thornz
- E-Town Concrete
- Extortionist
- First Blood
- Fury of Five
- Get the Shot
- Hatebreed
- Hoods
- Knocked Loose
- Knuckledust
- Kublai Khan
- Lionheart
- Malevolence
- Merauder
- Nasty
- Never Ending Game
- NJ Bloodline
- Pain of Truth
- Paleface Swiss
- Ringworm
- Speed
- Subzero
- Sunami
- Sworn Enemy
- Terror
- Throwdown
- Trapped Under Ice
- Vision of Disorder
- World of Pain
- Xibalba
