= Beatdown Hardwear =

German record label

BDHW Records
- Founded: 2005
- Founder: Toni Grunert
- Genre: Hardcore punk, beatdown hardcore, metalcore
- Location: Leipzig, Germany
- Official website: bdhw-records.com

Beatdown Hardwear (BDHW Records) is a Germany-based hardcore punk independent record label founded by Toni Grunert in 2005. As of January 2025, it has had 100+ official releases, featuring bands such as Nasty Fallbrawl, Born from Pain, Lionheart, Malevolence, Desolated and World of Pain.

The name of the label is a play on the name of the genre "beatdown hardcore", replacing the word "hardcore" with a misspelled variant of the word hardware.

Beatdown Hardwear is now mostly known a BDHW Records.

== Current artists ==
- Born From Pain
- Brutality Will Prevail
- CDC
- Coldburn
- Cold Hard Truth
- Dagger Threat
- DCA
- Detriment
- Dead End Tragedy
- Dead Man's Chest
- Desolated
- Easy Money
- Eisberg
- Enemy Mind
- Fallbrawl
- Guilt Trip
- Hardside
- Harm/Shelter
- I Am Revenge
- Lawgiver
- Lionheart
- Malevolence
- Mad At The World
- Manu Armata
- Nasty
- Negative Self
- No Altars
- No Zodiac
- Optimist
- Pallass
- Ruckus
- Ryker's
- Sand
- Slope
- These Streets
- The Last Charge
- The Setup
- Thronetorcher
- World of Pain
- Wolfpack
- Whatever It Takes
- Words of Concrete
- Worst
- XILE

== Former artists ==
- 45. Stainless
- Awaken Demons
- Circle of Death
- Delusions of Lunacy
- Dos Dias De Sangre
- Give Em Blood
- Last to Remain
- Look My Way
- Red Eyed Devil
- Screamin Silence
- Sun Tzu
- Twitching Tongues
- World Eater
- Xibalba
