= Desolated (band) =

British hardcore punk band

- Desolated at Metal Frenzy, Gardelegen, Germany, 2017

Background information
- Origin: Southampton, England
- Genres: Hardcore punk; beatdown hardcore
- Years active: 2007–present
- Labels: Holy Roar; Siege of Amida; Century Media; Beatdown Hardwear; MLVLTD
- Members: Tony Evans; Richy Unsworth; Les Law; Dan Ford; Charlie Thorpe
- Past members: Jake Marlowe

Desolated are a British hardcore punk band formed in Southampton in 2007. Known for a heavy, breakdown-driven style, the band signed to Siege of Amida/Century Media Records in 2014 and has toured widely in Europe and the United States. Their third studio album, Finding Peace, was released on MLVLTD in 2025.

== History ==
Desolated formed in Southampton in 2007. Their early releases included The Birth of Corruption (2010) and the album Verse of Judas (2012), released through Holy Roar Records. In a 2016 interview, bassist Jake Marlowe described Verse of Judas as "the one that put us on the map"; at the time the band was based in Southampton while Marlowe lived in London.

In June 2014 the band signed a multiple-album deal with Siege of Amida and Century Media Records covering the world outside the United States, and announced a 7-inch single, Fear of Life. Later that year they toured the United States, and in February 2016 they toured nine European countries with Lionheart and Kublai Khan. Their second album, The End, was released in 2016 on Beatdown Hardwear Records, followed by the EP A New Realm of Misery in 2019.

In October 2023 former bassist Jake Marlowe, who had moved to Israel in 2021, was killed in the Nova music festival massacre, where he was working as a security guard. Before his death was confirmed, the band appealed on social media for information about his whereabouts.

In 2024 Desolated were announced as support on a European tour headlined by Paleface Swiss alongside The Acacia Strain. In February 2025 they released the single "Bite Down", their first with new vocalist Tony Evans, through MLVLTD Music. Evans had previously played bass in the band. The album Finding Peace, mixed and mastered by Will Putney and featuring Malevolence drummer Charlie Thorpe, followed on 30 May 2025; Kerrang! described it as the band's first full-length in nearly a decade. By then the members were split between Sheffield and London and had written the record remotely over more than five years. During the album's release shows in June 2025, the band's van was broken into in Sheffield and their guitars and equipment were stolen. In 2026 they were announced as support for a European tour by Madball.

== Members ==
Current

- Tony Evans – vocals (previously bass)
- Richy Unsworth – guitar
- Les Law – guitar
- Dan Ford – bass
- Charlie Thorpe – drums

Former

- Jake Marlowe – bass, drums (died 2023)

== Discography ==
Studio albums

- Verse of Judas (2012)
- The End (2016)
- Finding Peace (2025)

Other releases

- The Birth of Corruption (2010)
- Fear of Life (7-inch single, 2014)
- A New Realm of Misery (EP, 2019)
