= Nasty (band) =

Belgian band

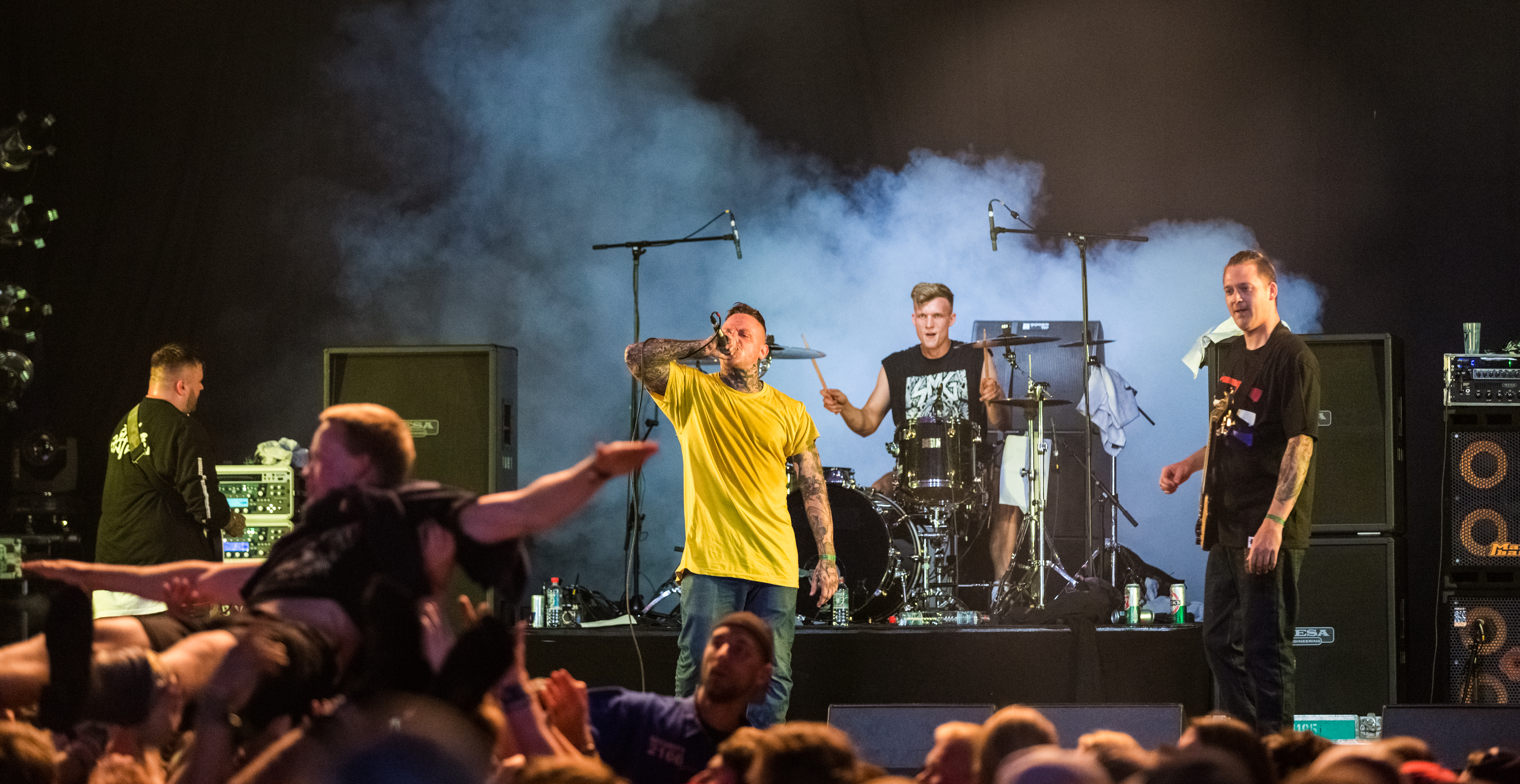
- Nasty performing live in 2016

Background information
- Origin: Kelmis, Liège, Belgium
- Genres: Beatdown hardcore, metalcore
- Years active: 2004–present
- Labels: Century Media, Beatdown Hardwear, GoodLife, Fuck This
- Members: Matthias Tarnath; Patrick Gajdzik; Christian "Nash" Fritz; Thomas Huschka

Nasty is a Belgian beatdown hardcore band from Kelmis. Formed in 2004 by former members of Van Damme, they emerged from the H8000 scene, soon relocating to Eupen. They released their debut album Declaring War (2006) through Fuck This Recordings, followed by Aggression (2008) and Give a Shit (2010) through Goodlife Recordings. In 2013, they signed to Beatdown Hardwear, who released their albums Love (2013), Shokka (2015) and Realigion (2017). Their following two albums Menace, (2020) and Heartbreak Criminals (2023), were released through Century Media Records.

== History ==
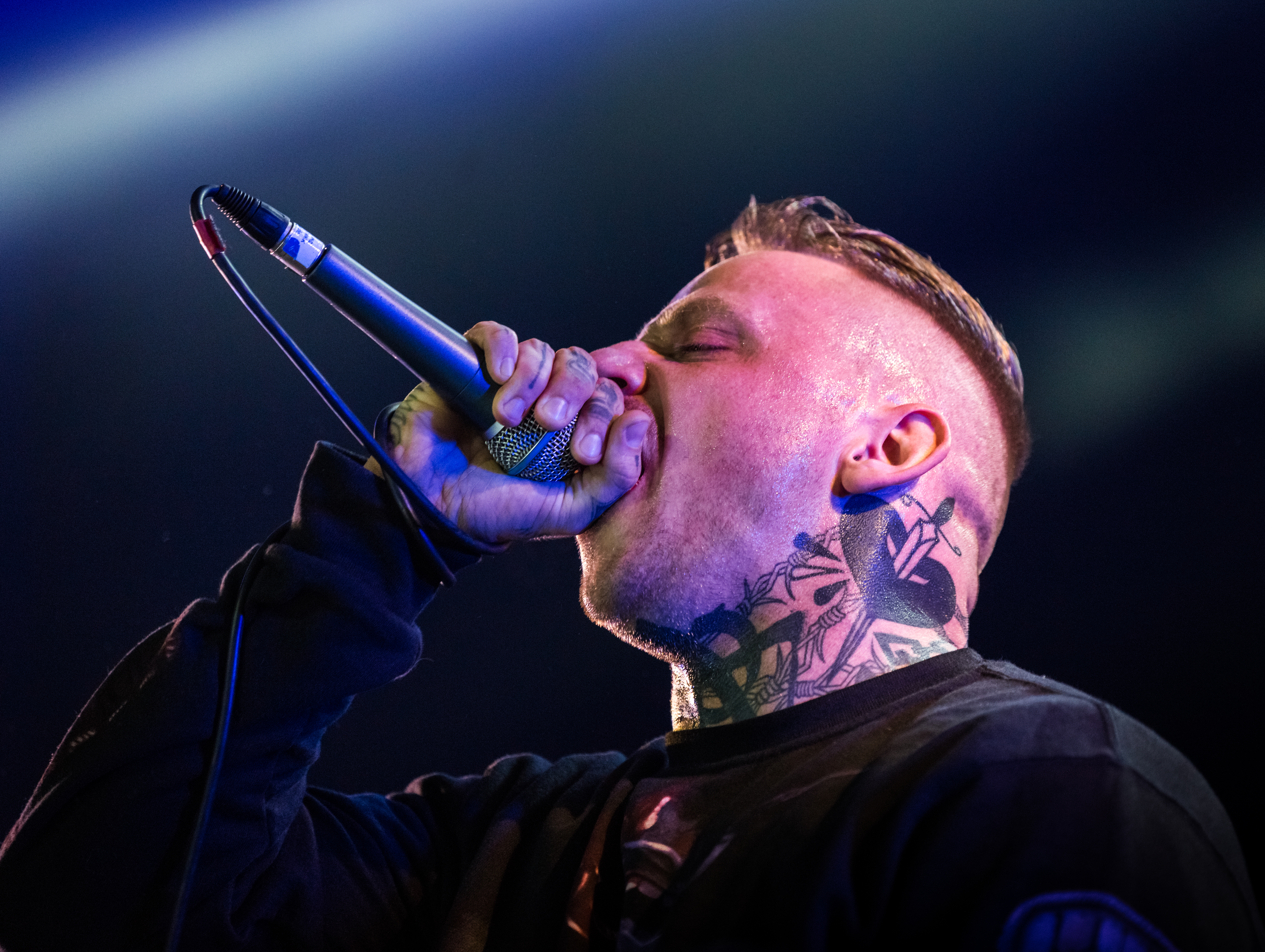
Vocalist Matthias Tarnath in 2016

Nasty was founded in November 2004 in Kelmis, Belgium, by former members of Van Damme. Due to backlash against their aggression, they relocated Eupen. Their early years were spent most associating with the West Flanders hardcore scene H8000 and its central record label GoodLife Recordings.

Their debut album, Declaring War, was released in 2006 via Fuck This Recordings. The band subsequently switched labels and released their second album on February 16, 2008; titled Aggression, it was financed by Goodlife Recordings. Give a Shit, released on July 10, 2010, was also financed and released through Goodlife Recordings. Their fourth studio album, Love, was released on 28 February 2013 via Beatdown Hardwear. This label change occurred partly because the musicians were dissatisfied with the record company's promotional efforts. On June 29, 2012, the group performed on the "Tentstage" at the With Full Force festival. In April 2012, the group had already played at the Impericon Festival in Leipzig. There, the band performed alongside acts such as Parkway Drive, The Ghost Inside, Born from Pain, Set Your Goals, While She Sleeps, and Caliban.

In March and April 2013, the group toured Germany, Belgium, and the Netherlands as part of the "Taste of Anarchy Tour" alongside A Traitor Like Judas, CDC, Warhound, and The Green River Burial. A performance at the Summerblast Festival in Trier followed in June 2013. In December 2013, Nasty toured Europe as a supporting act for Deez Nuts, alongside Your Demise and Madball; shows took place in Poland, the Czech Republic, Slovakia, Slovenia, Hungary, Serbia, Romania, Bulgaria, Bosnia and Herzegovina, and Austria. On December 26, 2013, Nasty played at the Underground club in Cologne—alongside Science of Sleep, Coldburn, and Desolated—as support for War from a Harlots Mouth on the latter's farewell tour. In January 2014, the group toured Europe with Suicidal Tendencies, Terror, Strife, Evergreen Terrace, Ramallah and the Arrs as part of the EMP Persistence Tour.

On 25 February 2015, they released their fifth album Shokka. On 10 September 2016, they released the single "At War with Love". Between 23 September and 29 October, they headlined a tour Europe with support from Malevolence, Varials, Aversions Crown, Sand and Vitja. They released their sixth album Realigion on 22 September 2017. In June 2019, they performed at Grass Pop Festival. In August, they played Reload Festival. During 2020, they signed to Century Media Records, then on 15 July, they announced their seventh album Menace was set for release on 25 September. On 27 July 2020, they released the single "Ultimate". On 22 June 2023, they released the single "Reality Check", announcing it would be a part of their eighth album Heartbreak Criminals, which would be released on 8 September. Between 3 and 24 November, they headlined the Impericon Never Say Die tour of Europe, with support from King 810, Chamber, Ten56., Fox Lake and Reduction. Between 2 and 10 September 2025, they co-headlined a tour of Australia alongside Paleface Swiss.

== Musical style ==
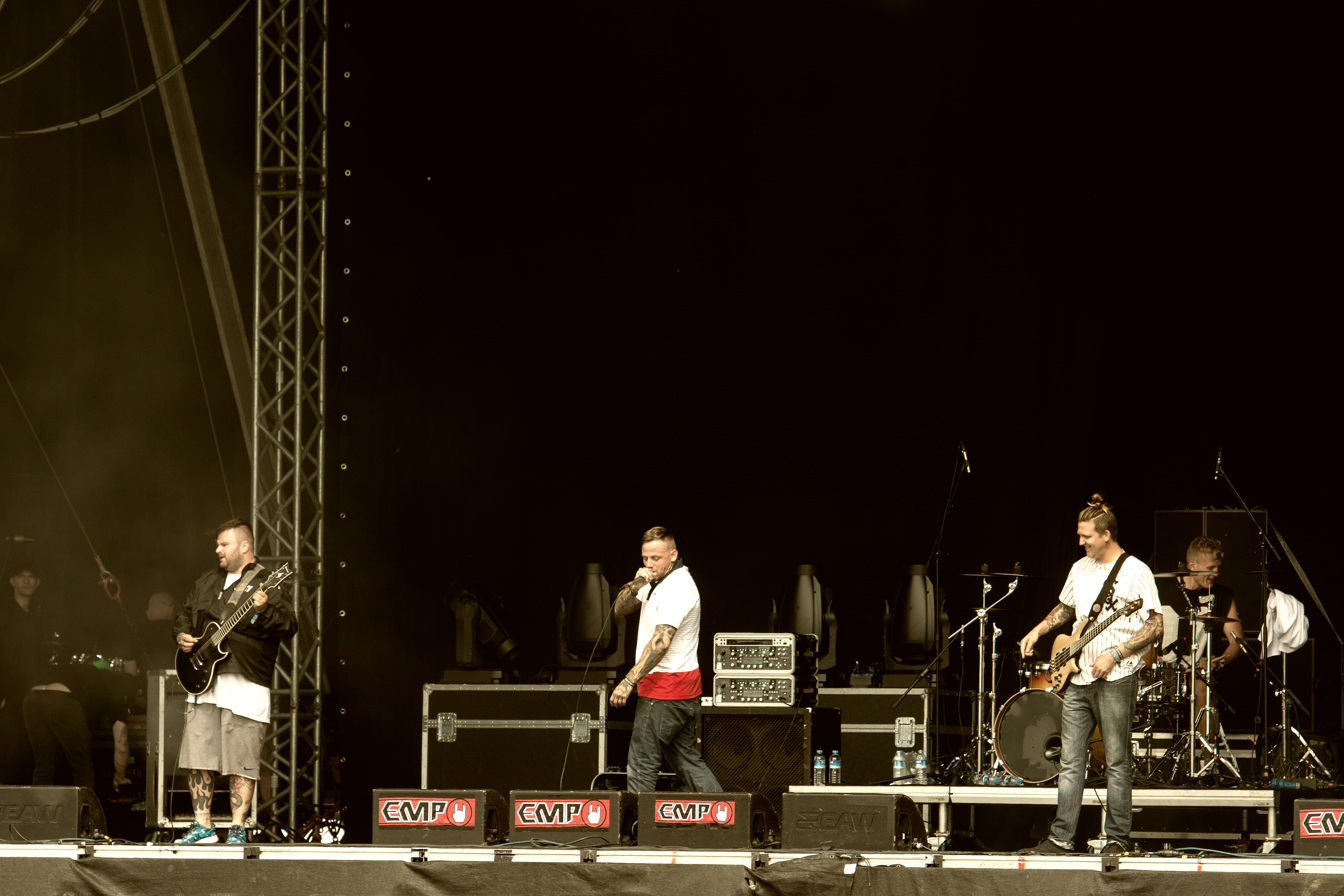
Nasty performing live in 2016

Critics have categorised Nasty's music as beatdown hardcore and metalcore.

Their music is often based around breakdowns, while also making use of death metal grooves, blast beats, tremolo picking, death growls palm muted open string riffs and rhythmic sections. They built upon the traditional beatdown sound but leaned further into metal as they progressed. Their lyrics are often antifascist and in support of anarchism.

They have cited influences including Cold as Life, Comin Correct, Madball, Agnostic Front, Rage Against the Machine, Clawfinger and Body Count.

== Discography ==
Albums

- Declaring War (2006)
- Aggression (2008)
- Give a Shit (2010)
- Love (2013)
- Shokka (2015)
- Realigion (2017)
- Menace (2020)
- Heartbreak Criminals (2023)

EPs

- NST RMX (2017)
- Black My Heart (2025)

Demos

- The Beginning (2005)

== Members ==
Nasty

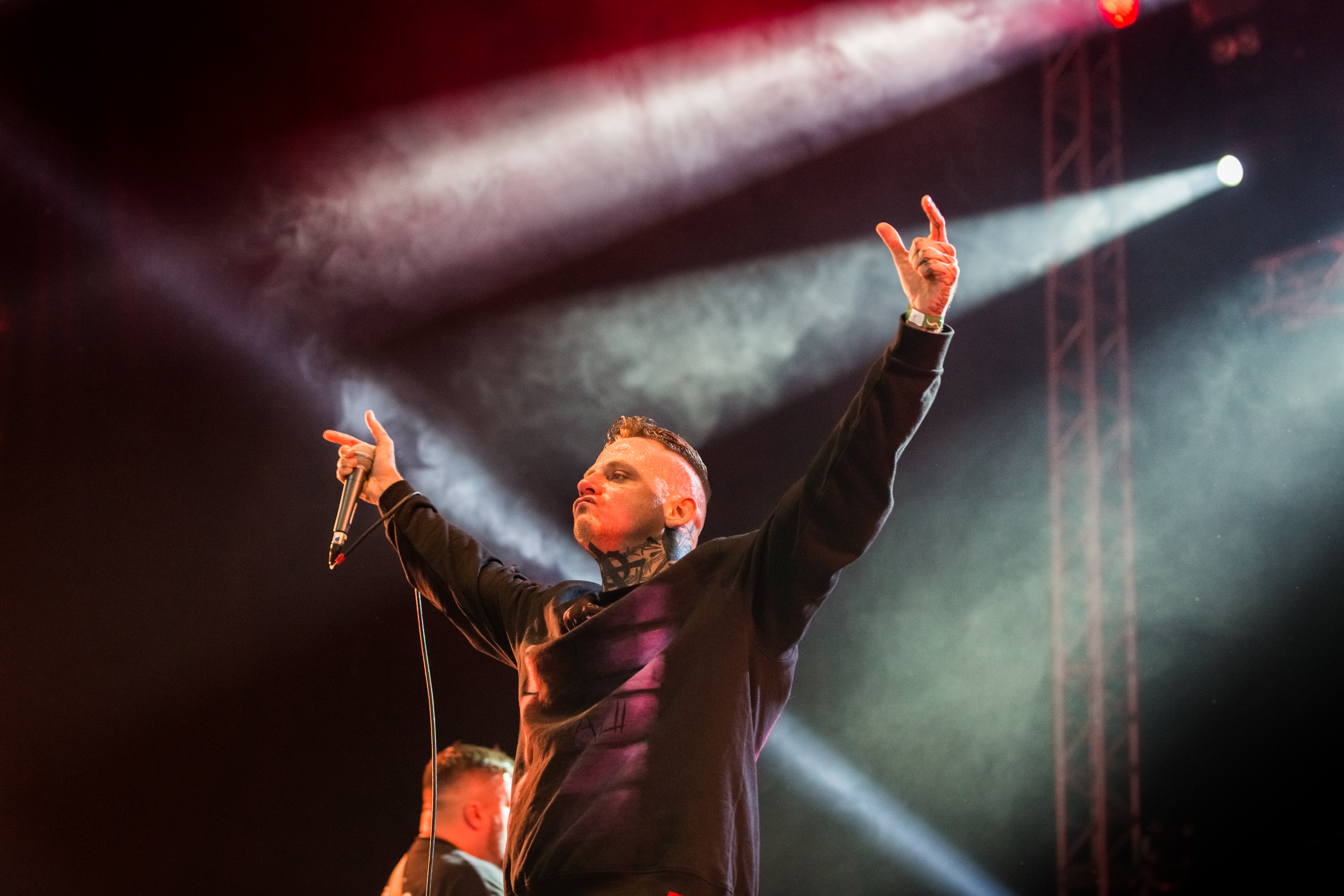
Matthias Tarnath

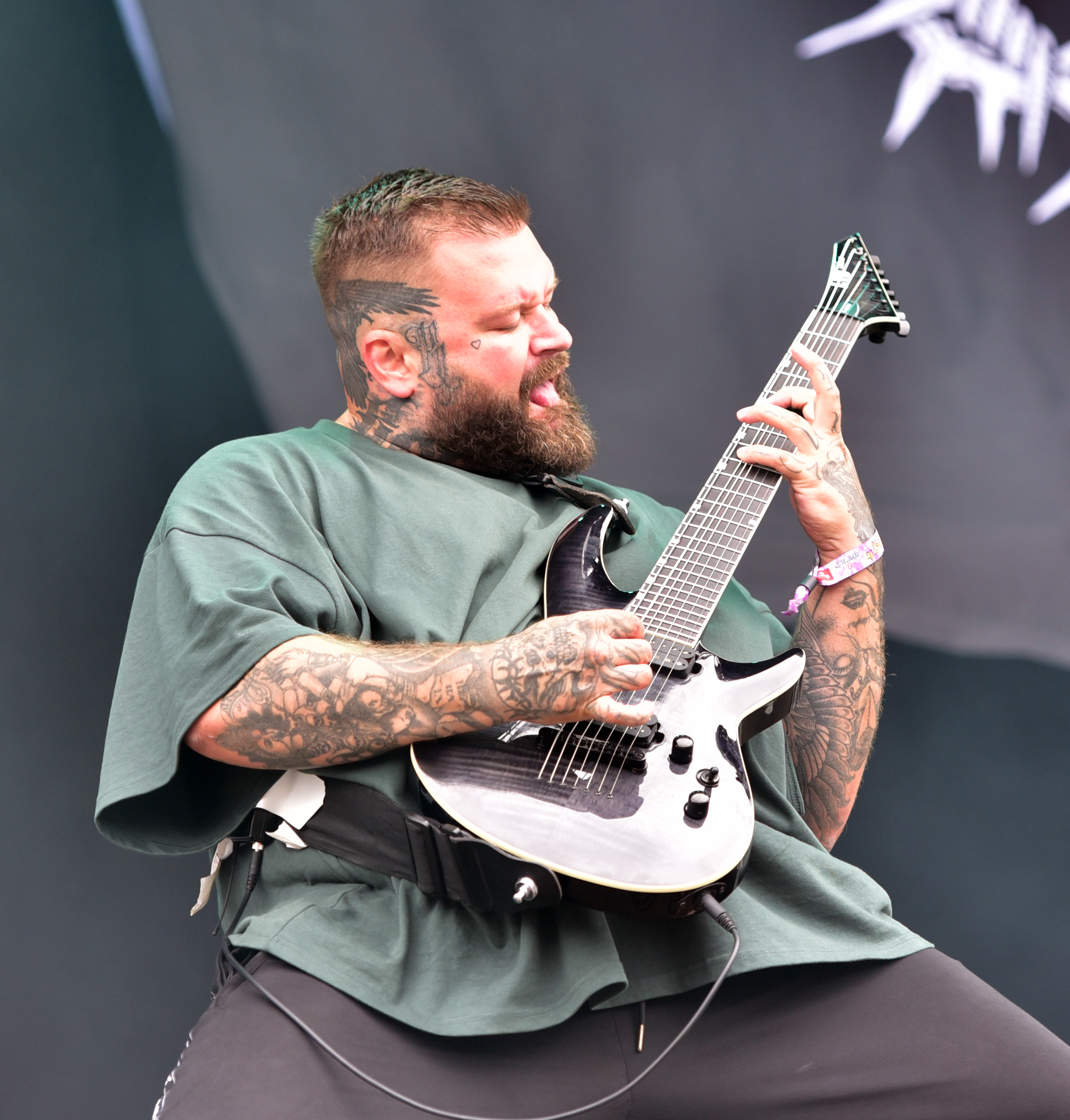
Patrick Gajdzik

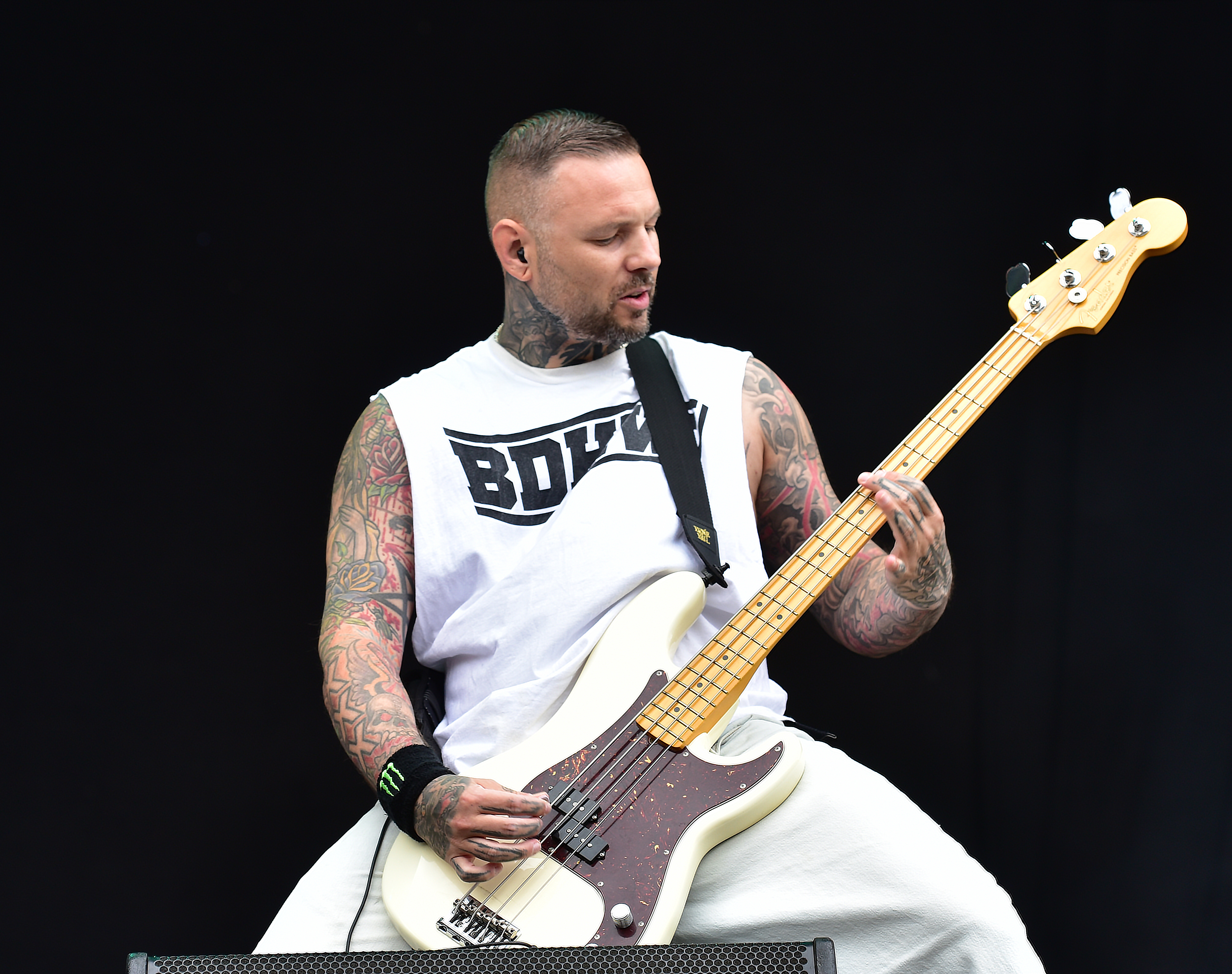
Thomas Huschka

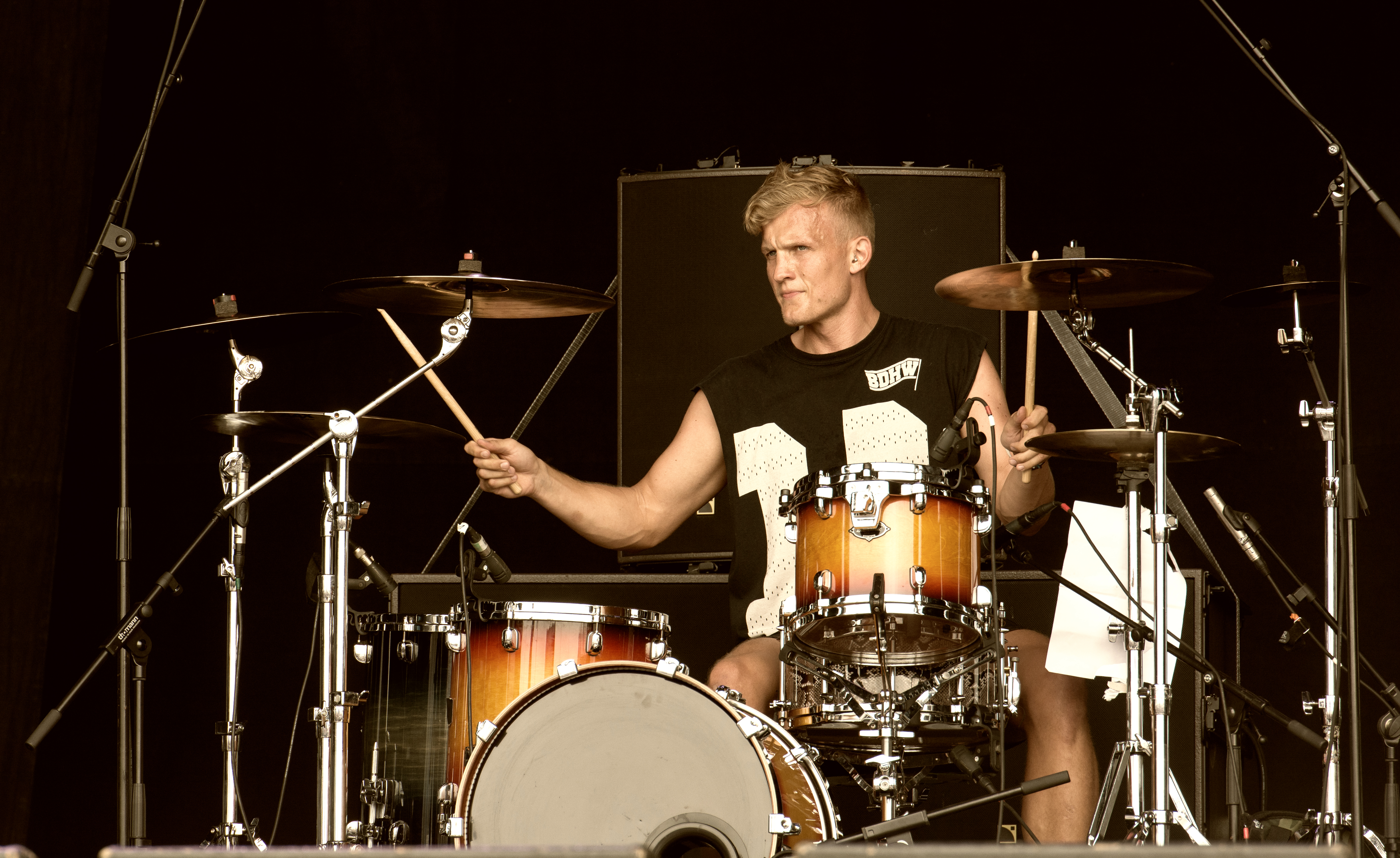
Christian "Nash" Fritz

Current

- Matthias Tarnath – vocals
- Patrick Gajdzik – guitar
- Christian "Nash" Fritz – drums
- Thomas Huschka – bass

Former

- Boris – guitar
- Georgie – guitar
- Christian Fritz – guitar
- Pat Ernst – bass
- Jean Toesano – bass
- Berislaw Audenaerd – bass
