= Get the Shot =

Canadian hardcore band

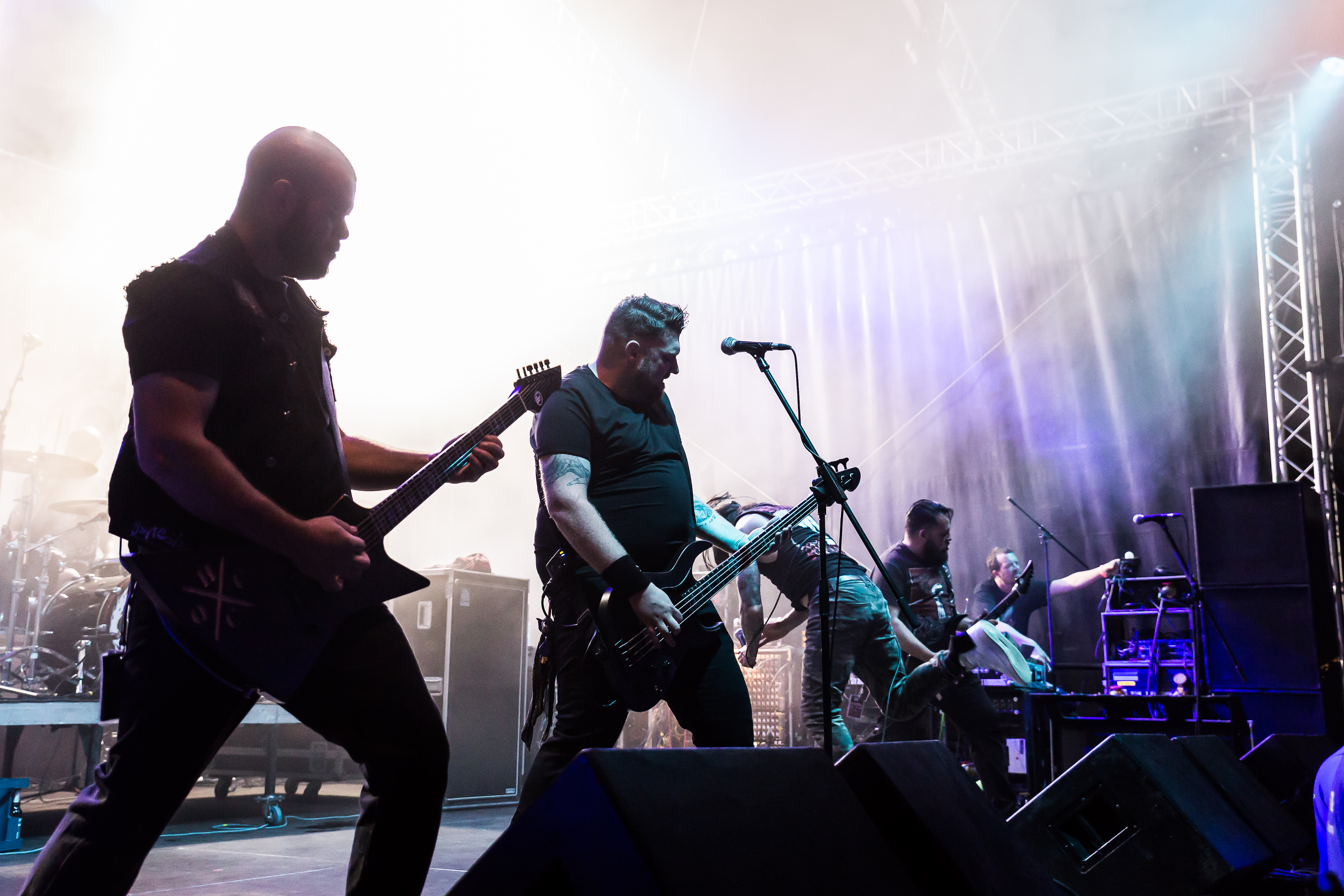
- Get the Shot performing at Metal Frenzy 2018

Background information
- Origin: Quebec City, Quebec, Canada
- Genres: Hardcore punk; metalcore; thrash metal
- Years active: 2009–present
- Label: Arising Empire
- Members: Mathieu Dhani; Tom Chiasson; Olivier Roy; Guy-Pierre Genest; Dan Fischer Roberge; Patrick Woods
- Past members: Jean-Philippe Lagacé; Samy Water; Max Cat; David St. Pierre; Sébastien Lalonde-Ricordi

Get the Shot is a Canadian hardcore/metalcore band from Quebec City, Quebec, formed in 2009.

== History ==
In 2009, the Quebec-based Get the Shot was born. In December of the same year, the quintet released a self-produced EP titled "In Fear We Stand". In 2012, the band released their debut album "Perdition" and have been bouncing around on record labels. In 2013, Get the Shot completed a European tour. In 2017, the band played two separate tours in Europe, in February as part of the You are Part of This tour with Comeback Kid and Deez Nuts, and in November with Nasty and Lionheart. In 2018, Get the Shot performed at the Hellfest festival in France as part of a European tour and later in the year at Heavy Montréal in Canada. That same year, they performed at the Metal Frenzy Open Air festival in Gardelegen, Germany.

In 2024, Get the Shot signed with German record label Arising Empire. Under the new label, Get the Shot released a music video for the song "Domination Predation".

== Musical style ==
In a review of the 2017 album Infinite Punishment, Austrian online magazine Stormbringer put Get the Shot in the hardcore section, but also saw elements of deathcore and beatdown and draws comparisons to Malevolence. Mighty Sounds saw the music of the bands as a form of anger which is pointed toward the cruel places many people live in.

== Band Members ==
Current

- Mathieu Dhani - vocals
- Olivier Roy – guitar
- Tom Chiasson – guitar
- Guy-Pierre Genest – guitar
- Dan Fischer Roberge – bass
- Patrick Woods – drums

Former

- Jean-Philippe Lagacé – vocals
- Samy Water – guitar
- Max Cat – drums
- David St. Pierre – drums
- Sébastien Lalonde-Ricordi – drums

== Discography ==
EPs

- 2009: In Fear We Stand
- 2026: Crucifixion Depiction

Albums

- 2012: Perdition
- 2014: No Peace in Hell
- 2017: Infinite Punishment
- 2022: Merciless Destruction
