= World of Pain =

American hardcore band (2009–2019)

- Origin: San Diego, California, U.S.
- Genres: Metalcore, beatdown hardcore
- Years active: 2009–2019
- Label: Beatdown Hardwear
- Members: Noah Friend; Vito Lograsso; Tristan Huarte; Timothy 'TJ' Seely; Paul Dove
- Past members: Conor Drury; Ryan 'Face' Brooks; Swayho Haines; Shawn McClendon
- Website: worldofpainhc.com

World of Pain was an American metalcore band from San Diego, California.

== History ==
Formed in 2009, World of Pain has released two studio albums, two EPs and one 3-way split. Shortly after the release of their 2009 demo, World of Pain signed with Beatdown Hardwear, releasing the Earthquake Split in 2010 with fellow American bands Ruckus and Xibalba. In 2011, the band released their self-titled debut studio album, World of Pain, via Beatdown Hardwear. The album featured guest vocalists Thaddeus 'Tad' Stamps of Stout, Martin Gonzalez of Billy Club Sandwich, Matthias 'Matthi' Odysseus of Nasty, and a secret track featuring voice actor Jon St. John as the voice of Duke Nukem. In 2013, World of Pain released an EP via Beatdown Hardwear titled Improvise & Survive in collaboration with clothing brand Us Versus Them. A few years later in 2016, World of Pain released their second studio album on Beatdown Hardwear titled End Game. This album featured guest vocalists Jeremy Tingle of Lifeless and Mike Score of All Out War. The following year in 2017, in collaboration with Retribute Records (Japan), World of Pain released their second EP, titled No Utopia. After 10 years of being together, World of Pain announced on March 6, 2019, via social media that 2019 would mark the final year of World of Pain. World of Pain played their final show on January 4, 2020, in their hometown of San Diego, California.

== Members ==
- Noah Friend – vocals
- Vito Lograsso – guitars
- Tristan Huarte – guitars
- Timothy 'TJ' Seely – bass
- Paul Dove – drums

== Discography ==
=== Studio albums ===
- Self-titled (2011)
- End Game (2016)

=== EPs ===
- Improvise & Survive (2013)
- No Utopia (2017)

=== Splits ===
- Earthquake Split (2010)

== Notable tours and festivals ==
- Long Island Fest (2011) featuring Most Precious Blood, Xibalba, Skycamefalling, Cipher, Foundation, Incendiary, The Partisan Turbine, and more.
- European Takeover Tour (2012) featuring Nasty and Fallbrawl.
- Summer of Hate (2012) featuring 100 Demons, Shattered Realm, Death Before Dishonor, Nasty, Suburban Scum, Sand and more.
- Bloodaxe Festival (2013) featuring Shai Hulud, Obey The Brave, Culture, Alpha & Omega, Loyal to the Grave and more.
- Tough Love Fest 3 (2014) featuring Earth Crisis, Shai Hulud, Sworn In, Death Before Dishonor, Lionheart and more.
- Tough Love Fest 4 (2015) featuring Sworn Enemy, Sworn Vengeance, 2X4, Redeemer, One X Choice and more.
- New England Metal and Hardcore Festival (2015) featuring Between the Buried and Me, Testament, Motionless in White, The Red Chord, Exodus, Code Orange, Death Before Dishonor and more.
- For the Children (2015) featuring Rotting Out, Power Trip, Death Threat, Strife, Modern Life Is War, Alpha & Omega, Xibalba and more.
- European Tour (2016) featuring CDC and Harm/Shelter.
- A Ruhrpott Hardcore Brawl (2016) featuring CDC, In Blood We Trust, Enemy Ground and more.
- Return to Strength Festival (2016) featuring Power Trip, Expire, CDC, No Turning Back, Knuckle Dust, Steel Nation, Laid 2 Rest and more.
- Homefront Presents.. (2017) featuring Skarhead, Billy Club Sandwich, Manipulate, Regulate and more.
- Brick by Brick Festival (2017) featuring Strength for a Reason, Naysayer, Trail of Lies, Enemymind, Laid 2 Rest and more.
- Bloodaxe Festival (2017) featuring Nasty, First Blood, After the Burial, Loyal to the Grave, Incendiary and more.
- For the Children (2017) featuring Infest, Terror, Ramallah, All Out War, Bitter End, Xibalba, Strife and more.
- Midwest Blood Fest (2018) featuring Knocked Loose, Bent Life, Blood In Blood Out, Year of the Knife, Heavens Die and more.
- EKB Fest Volume 1 (2019) featuring Xibalba, Billy Club Sandwich, Line of Scrimmage, Absolute Suffering and more.
- Mosh for Paws Festival (2019) featuring Xibalba, Racetraitor, No Zodiac and more.
