= Never Ending Game =

American hardcore band

- Origin: Detroit, Michigan, U.S.
- Genres: Beatdown hardcore; tough guy hardcore
- Years active: 2018–present
- Label: Triple B
- Members: Mikey Petroski; Mike Wasylenko; Will Kaelin; Derrick Daniel; Denis Halilovic
- Website: neverendinggame.net

Never Ending Game is an American hardcore punk band formed in Detroit, Michigan in 2018. Formed by former members of multiple Detroit hardcore bands, the band merge elements of heavy metal–influenced styles of hardcore such as beatdown hardcore and tough guy hardcore, with more melodic elements like harmonised lead guitars and guitar solos. They have released two full-length albums and two EPs.

== History ==
Never Ending Game was formed in Spring 2018. Its members had previously played in groups including True Love, Freedom, Breaking Wheel and Detain, and had begun discussing the formation of the band at the final Detain and Freedom shows. On June 16, 2018, they released their debut self-released EP Welcome to the... On September 25, 2019, they released the singles "Puppet" and "God Forgives". These tracks were included on their debut album Just Another Day on October 11, 2019, through Triple B Records.

On August 20, 2021, they released the single "But Not For Me", which would be a part of the EP Halo and Wings, released on September 24. On September 24, 2022, they performed at a Triple B Records, Streets of Hate and Daze Records showcase, alongside Pain of Truth and Sunami.

On March 22, 2023, the band released the double single Memories - Never Die, which included the songs "Never Die", featuring Justice Tripp and Sam Trapkin of Trapped Under Ice, and "Memories". On April 19, 2023, they released the single "Tank On E", alongside a music video filmed and directed by ReelLife Creative House. On May 3, 2023, they released the single "Hate Today... Die Tomorrow". The songs were included on their second album Outcry, released on May 12, 2023. On October 10, 2023, they opened for a reunited Cold As Life at Detroit Hardcore festival alongside Terror, Madball and Integrity. On December 30, 2023, they performed at Black Christmas festival in Detroit, alongside Ringworm. They performed at FYA festival, which took place on January 6 and 7, 2024, headlined by Trapped Under Ice and Dying Fetus. They performed at LDB Fest, which took place on March 22 and 23, headlined by Hatebreed and Obituary. They performed at Bangin' In The Rock festival 2024, which took place on September 27 and 28.

== Musical style and influences ==
Critics have categorized Never Ending Game's music as beatdown hardcore and tough guy hardcore. They make use of common traits in those genres, including heavy, palm muted guitar riffs, breakdowns, influence from heavy metal, lyrics about toughness and gang vocals, while also incorporating more melodic elements such as harmonised lead guitars and grand guitar solos. NoEcho writer Hannah Fitzmorris called them "[maybe] hardcore's first example of emotional-beatdown." Their music often makes use of elements of hip hop and samples from Motown records. Brooklyn Vegan writer Hugo Reyes noted elements of pop-punk and indie rock on their second album Outcry, as well as influence from melodic metalcore and melodic death metal. Noizze writer Nathaniel Maure described them as "Keeping to the very obvious Detroit sound the band are so proud of and pumped out track after track, somehow they also managed something that’s catchy, ensnaring and yet still effortlessly pulverising."

They have cited influences including Cold as Life, Bulldoze, Next Step Up, E.Town Concrete, Negative Approach, Crown of Thornz, Earthmover, One Second Thought, Second to None and Krutch.

== Members ==
- Mikey Petroski – vocals
- Mike Wasylenko – guitar
- Will Kaelin – guitar
- Derrick Daniel – drums
- Denis Halilovic – bass

== Discography ==
Studio albums

- Just Another Day (2019)
- Outcry (2023)

EPs

- Welcome to the... (2018)
- Halo and Wings (2021)
