= Love Don't Live Here (album) =

Studio album by Lionheart
- Released: January 22, 2016
- Genres: Beatdown hardcore, metalcore
- Length: 27:31
- Labels: LHHC (US), Beatdown Hardwear(Europe, Asia)
- Producers: Cody Fuentes at Rapture Recording Studios in Hayward, California

Lionheart chronology
Welcome to the West Coast (2014)	Love Don't Live Here (2016)

Singles from Love Don't Live Here
- 1. "Pain" Released: November 23, 2015; 2. "Love Don't Live Here" Released: January 25, 2016

Love Don't Live Here is the fourth album released by American hardcore band Lionheart. The album was released on January 22, 2016 via LHHC Records in the US and Beatdown Hardwear in Europe and Asia. The album's name is a reference to the song of the same name by funk band Rose Royce, which is one of Rob Watson's favorite recordings.

The album was streamed four days prior to its release via Metal Hammer.

Professional ratings
Review scores
Source	Rating
RevolverMag	3/5 stars

== Reception ==
Jens Kirsch, a writer for the German punk fanzine Ox compared the album with other albums from Hatebreed (The Concrete Confessional) and Born from Pain. He gave the album a positive review, writing:

Even if the band slowed down to a moderate speed in their music there will be much groove. The counts of gang shouts and the monstrous breakdowns may bring much action in the mosh pit.

Taylor Markarian of Revolver adds:

Love Don't Live Here is a sturdy hardcore record as it's brazen and to the point. Songs like "Pain", "Rewind" and the title track spit honest, street tough lyrics and are solid to stomp and throw down to. However, the spirit of ingenuity gets a little lost. While it is clear Lionheart are "still proud of HxC" as they say on their track "Still", this full-length sticks to the old school hardcore sound and doesn't step too far out of the bounds.

== Track listing ==
All tracks are written by Rob Watson and Evan Krejci.

No.	Title	Length
1.	"Pain"	2:35
2.	"Keep Talkin'"	2:13
3.	"Witness"	2:44
4.	"Bury Me"	3:20
5.	"Love Don't Live Here"	2:53
6.	"Rewind (feat. Andrew Mastiff)"	2:06
7.	"Still"	2:16
8.	"New Enemies"	2:32
9.	"Lock Jaw (feat. Cameron Grabowski)"	2:39
10.	"Dead Wrong (feat. Richard Mathews)"	2:49
11.	"Going Back to the Bay"	1:18
Total length:		27:31

== Personnel ==
- Rob Watson – vocals
- Cameron Grabowski – guitars
- Nik Warner – guitars
- Brandon Wells – bass
- Jay Scott – drums
