= Venom Prison =

Welsh death metal band

- Origin: South Wales, U.K.
- Genre: Death metal
- Years active: 2015–2022 (hiatus)
- Labels: Prosthetic, Century Media
- Spinoff of: Brutality Will Prevail, Wolf Down
- Members: Larissa Stupar: Ash Gray; Ben Thomas; Mike Jefferies; Joe Bills
- Past members: Richy Unsworth; Joe Sheehy; Jay Pipprell

Venom Prison are a Welsh death metal band. Stephen Hill of Metal Hammer described their second album as "2019’s most anticipated extreme metal albums". Their lead vocalist Larissa Stupar was described by Kerrang! as "metal's most important - and uncompromising - voice". The band has released four studio albums.

== History ==
In 2015, former Wolf Down vocalist Larissa Stupar (born in Russia) moved to Wales, where she met Ash Gray of Brutality Will Prevail. They began writing music and coined the name "Venom Prison" as it was "the most metal name they could imagine". The pair released the demo EP Defy the Tyrant in 2015, before recruiting lead guitarist Ben Thomas, drummer Joe Sheehy, and bassist Mike Jeffries. This line-up released the 2015 EP The Primal Chaos.

The band released their debut studio album on 14 October 2016, Animus. The album was released to critical acclaim.

On 7 July 2017, the band released a music video for "Perpetrator Emasculation" from Animus.

The band were set to support Decapitated on their November 2017 European tour. Following the arrest of all four members of Decapitated for allegations of rape, Venom Prison cancelled their shows with the band.

In August 2018, the band was set to join Dying Fetus, Toxic Holocaust and Goatwhore on their European tour, but the tour was canceled because of "personal issues"

In May and June 2019, the band toured Europe, beginning in Germany and ending in the UK, opening for Fit for an Autopsy.

Their second studio album, Samsara, was released on 15 March 2019.

On 21 March 2019, the band announced a collaboration with American streetwear brand The Hundreds.

Venom Prison's third album, Primeval, a collection of re-recorded early material, was released on 9 October 2020.

On 10 December 2020, Venom Prison announced that they had been signed to Century Media Records, and begun recording their next studio album. The album, Erebos, was released on 4 February 2022. Venom Prison performed on the Main Stage at Bloodstock 2021.

== Musical style and influences ==
The band are generally described as death metal, featuring elements of hardcore punk and grindcore. In an article for Metal Hammer by Stephen Hill, they were described as "part-death metal/part-hardcore". Their lyrics are generally based around political and social topics such as misogyny, rape culture, fascism, mental health and organized religion. The members have cited influences including Carcass, Napalm Death and Metallica. Frontwoman Larissa Stupar has described her past involvement in anti-fascist and animal rights activism as inspiring the political content of Venom Prison's music.

== Members ==
Current line-up

- Larissa Stupar – lead vocals (2015–present)
- Ash Gray – guitar (2015–present)
- Ben Thomas – guitar (2015–present)
- Mike Jefferies – bass (2015–present)
- Joe Bills – drums (2019–present)

Past members

- Joe Sheehy – drums (2015–2017)
- Jay Pipprell – drums (2017–2019)

Timeline

== Discography ==
Studio albums

- Animus (2016)
- Samsara (2019)
- Primeval (2020)
- Erebos (2022)

EPs

- Defy the Tyrant (2015)
- The Primal Chaos (2015)

== Accolades ==
Nominated work	Year	Award	Result
Venom Prison	2017	Metal Hammer Golden Gods Awards - Best New Band	Won
Venom Prison	2018	Heavy Music Awards - BEST UK BREAKTHROUGH BAND	Nominated
