= Jake Marlowe =

British-Israeli bassist (1997–2023)

- Marlowe performing with Desolated at Metal Frenzy, Gardelegen, Germany, 2017

Background information
- Born: Jake Aaron Marlowe; 9 July 1997; England
- Died: 7 October 2023 (aged 26) near Re'im, Israel
- Genre: Hardcore punk
- Instruments: Bass guitar, drums

Jake Aaron Marlowe (9 July 1997 – 7 October 2023) was a British-Israeli musician, best known as the former bassist of the British hardcore band Desolated. He emigrated to Israel in 2021 and was killed in the Nova music festival massacre while working as a security guard at the festival.

Known in the band as "the Riff Lord", Marlowe played drums and later bass in Desolated and toured with the band. During the attack he helped evacuate festival-goers before he was killed. He was one of 14 British nationals killed in the 7 October attacks, and his death drew tributes from the hardcore and metal scene, including from David Draiman of Disturbed. His parents have since established several memorial projects in Israel and the United Kingdom, and his story is featured in the touring Nova Exhibition.

== Early life ==
Marlowe was born in England to a Jewish family and grew up in Potters Bar, Hertfordshire. He attended JFS and was a member of the BBYO youth movement. His mother recalled that he was "heavily into his music" from a young age, with a particular love of hardcore.

== Music career ==
Marlowe first played drums and later bass in Desolated, earning the nickname "the Riff Lord", and toured with the band. Desolated is a British hardcore band whose releases include the album The Birth of Corruption (2010), the studio album The End (2016) and the EP A New Realm of Misery (2019). In a 2016 interview as the band's bassist, Marlowe said that the album Verse of Judas was "the one that put us on the map", spoke about the band's label, Beatdown Hardwear Records, and described its forthcoming album as "the Desolated sound but matured and fine tuned"; at the time the band was based in Southampton, while Marlowe lived in London. A friend described him as "a well-noted musician in the UK metal and hardcore scene". Following his disappearance and death in October 2023, fans of Desolated posted hundreds of messages of sympathy, and the band appealed on Facebook to anyone in Israel for information about him, writing that he "went missing after the attacks on the nature party festival which he was working security for".

== Life in Israel ==
In November 2021, aged 24, Marlowe emigrated to Israel. According to a lifelong friend, he had become interested in his family roots and felt he belonged in Israel. His father said that social media posts about pro-Palestinian protests in London had resonated with him, and that he told his parents he no longer felt safe in the UK. He settled in Ma'alot in northern Israel and took up carpentry. He was close friends with Shlomi Ziv, whose family had "adopted" him in Israel, and Aviv Eliyahu.

== Death ==
On 7 October 2023 Marlowe was working as an unarmed security guard, together with Ziv and Eliyahu, at the Nova music festival near Kibbutz Re'im when it was attacked by Hamas gunmen during the October 7 attacks. Early that morning he phoned his parents to say that rockets were being fired and that he would call back, and later texted his mother that he was safe. In a voice message to a friend he said that he and Ziv were using a quad bike to evacuate festival-goers.

According to his father, Marlowe made several trips in a buggy to help people escape before the area was overrun; he then got into a car that came under fire, was the last of its four occupants to get out, and was shot nine times. His mother said that "he could have run, but he chose to stay and try to save as many lives as possible".

Marlowe was reported missing. His father flew to Israel on 10 October to search for him and was initially told that he was believed to have been taken hostage to Gaza; he identified his son's body on 11 October, the day the Israeli Embassy in London announced the death. Marlowe was one of 14 British nationals killed in the attacks. He was buried in north London, and at his stone-setting his father eulogised him as "our hero". Eliyahu was also killed; Ziv was taken hostage to Gaza and was rescued on 8 June 2024 in the Nuseirat operation.

== Legacy ==
Memorial to Marlowe at the Nova festival site near Re'im

His lifelong friend Daniel Aboudy said of him, "He would give the shirt off his back to help others", and his father has described him as "our life's masterpiece". A heavy metal tribute concert in London in December 2023 raised £3,000 for the charity Kisharon Langdon. On 9 July 2024, what would have been his 27th birthday, more than 100 people attended a memorial ceremony for him in Brighton and Hove, and David Draiman, frontman of Disturbed, paid tribute to him in a video message played at the ceremony. His parents, Lisa and Michael Marlowe, have led several memorial projects in Israel and the United Kingdom:

- A Magen David Adom ambulance dedicated in his memory, which had been dispatched more than 2,000 times by May 2026, as well as an emergency-response motorbike and a bomb shelter near the Nova site.
- Guide-dog puppies at the Israel Guide Dog Centre named in his memory.
- The Jakey M Project, which aims to bring people together "through music, connection, positivity and community", and raises money for the Israel Guide Dog Centre to train guide dogs, PTSD service dogs and emotional support dogs, and which held a party in London for bat mitzvah girls whose fathers had been killed on or after 7 October.
- A "Bake for Jake" challah bake organised by the project in 2026 drew more than 300 participants and raised £10,000 for the Israel Guide Dog Centre UK.
- A tree planted in his memory in Finchley.
- The Jake Marlowe Memorial Scholarship, run by Youth Aliyah Child Rescue, for young people in Israel.

His story is featured in the touring Nova Exhibition, which opened in east London on 20 May 2026; his parents said that bringing the exhibition to London felt "like our boy is coming home for six weeks". His parents spoke at the exhibition on what would have been his 29th birthday, the day Mayor of London Sadiq Khan visited it. In a 2026 interview with Sky News, his parents described antisemitism in Britain as "like a wildfire". They have also criticised the British government's treatment of bereaved families. After visiting the exhibition in London and meeting Marlowe's parents and survivors of the attack, Boy George wrote the song "We Will Dance Again", describing Marlowe as having been murdered while trying to help others.
