= Finding Peace =

Studio album by Desolated
- Released: May 30, 2025
- Length: 23:01
- Label: MLVLTD
- Producer: Will Putney

Desolated chronology
New Realm of Misery (2019)	Finding Peace (2025)

Singles from Finding Peace
- 1. "Bite Down" Released: 26 February 2025; 2. "Glass Ceiling" Released: 19 April 2025

Finding Peace is the third studio album by British hardcore band Desolated. It was released via MLVLTD, on 30 May 2025.

== Background ==
Released six years after the band's 2019 EP, New Realm of Misery, and produced, mixed and mastered by Will Putney, Finding Peace is composed of ten songs ranging between one and three minutes each, with a total runtime of approximately twenty-three minutes.

The album's first single, "Bite Down", was released on 26 February 2025, alongside a music video directed by Daniel Priess and filmed in Dublin and Belfast in September 2024. It was followed by "Glass Ceiling", the second single, on 19 April 2025.

== Reception ==
Professional ratings
Review scores
Source	Rating
Distorted Sound	8/10 stars
Kerrang!	3/5 stars
Metal Hammer	6/10 stars
Sputnikmusic	3.2/5

Nik Young of Metal Hammer rated the album six out of ten and stated, "Their new release continues along a similar trajectory to 2016's The End, but sees Dan Ford return on bass and introduces new vocalist Tony Evans, who replaces Paul Williams." Kerrang! gave the album a three out of five rating and described it as "an undeniably fantastic-sounding record," opining "The wheel might not have been reinvented here, but it's been given a damn good polishing."

Benjamin Jack of Sputnikmusic assigned it a score of 3.2 out of five, noting that, "musically, Finding Peace doesn't stray far from the band's comfort zone, and it's unlikely to convert skeptics." Distorted Sound, rating the album eight out of ten, praised the album and called it "probably Desolated's best record yet, although we have had The End for about nine years so time will kinda have to tell."

== Track listing ==
Finding Peace track listing
No.	Title	Length
1.	"The Stomper"	1:17
2.	"Lessons"	2:08
3.	"Bite Down"	2:27
4.	"Glass Ceiling"	2:43
5.	"Never Enough"	1:15
6.	"Endless Betrayal" (featuring Ninebar)	3:22
7.	"Let It Slide" (featuring Whispers)	1:59
8.	"Victim 2.0" (featuring D Bloc)	3:12
9.	"Enemy"	2:42
10.	"Dead End 2025"	2:36
Total length:		23:01
