= Madre mía gracias por los días =

Studio album by Xibalba
- Released: 2010; June 21, 2011 (Reissue)
- Recorded: Earth Capital Studios
- Genre: Hardcore punk
- Length: 34:44
- Label: Self-released, Beatdown Hardware; A389, Southern Lord (Reissue)
- Producer: Ben Hammerstrom, Xibalba

Xibalba chronology
Madre mía gracias por los días (2010)	Hasta la Muerte (2012)

Madre mía gracias por los días is the debut album by the hardcore band Xibalba, originally released in 2010 by the band itself and Beatdown Hardware Records. Later, re-released on June 21, 2011 by A389 Recordings and Southern Lord Recordings.

== Track listing ==
No.	Title	Length
1.	"Bright Sun"	2:57
2.	"Madre mia"	5:43
3.	"Never Kneel"	4:30
4.	"Fallen"	3:25
5.	"Time's Up" (feat. Jason Brunes)	5:05
6.	"We Deserve to Die"	4:51
7.	"Red"	2:35
8.	"Obituary"	5:38
Total length:		34:44

2011 release bonus tracks^{†}
No.	Title	Length
9.	"Cold" (feat. Justin Moore)	3:00
10.	"Spanish Harlem"	3:42
11.	"Cursed"	2:56
12.	"Salvation" (feat. Taylor Young)	4:27

^† Originally released as part of Earthquake compilation and recorded at Young Bros Studios. Also produced by Xibalba not Ben Hammerstrom.

== Personnel ==
Xibalba

- Nate Rebolledo - vocals
- Brian Ortiz - electric guitar
- Jensen Hucle - electric guitar, acoustic guitar
- Jason Brunes - drums
- Bryan Valdivia - bass

Production

- Alex Estrada - mastering
- Ben Hammerstrom - producer
