= Brutality Will Prevail =

Welsh hardcore band

- Origin: Cardiff, Wales
- Genres: Metalcore; sludge metal; tough guy hardcore
- Years active: 2005–2022
- Labels: Beatdown Hardwear; Siege of Amida; Purgatory; Holy Roar; Pinky Swear
- Spinoffs: Venom Prison
- Members: Louis Gauthier; Nick Rix; Jordan Murray; Marc Richards; Adam Gent
- Past members: Gareth Arnold; Ajay Jones; Ash Gray; Craig Reynolds; Richard 'Dog' Dyas; Emlyn Lamb; James Goodman; Dale Williams; Adam Evans; Rohan Bishop; Huw Jones

Brutality Will Prevail (sometimes abbreviated BWP) were a Welsh hardcore punk band founded in Cardiff. Formed in 2005, the band went through significant lineup changes throughout their 17 year career, including seven years fronted by vocalist Ajay Jones who featured on their first three studio albums, and ten years fronted by Louis Gauthier. The band officially disbanded in 2022. They released six studio albums and six EPs, including two split EPs.

== History ==
In 2005, vocalist Gareth Arnold, guitarist James Goodman, bassist Dale Williams and drummer Adam Evans formed Brutality Will Prevail. This lineup released the Life Is Our War EP later that year, before Arnold and Williams both departed. Subsequently, Ajay Jones was hired as the band's vocalist and Emlyn Lamb as bassist. Their debut album Forgotten Soul was released in 2009, and their second Root of All Evil was released the following year. In December 2011 and January 2012, they toured the United Kingdom and mainland Europe alongside Harm's Way and Dead End Path, including the January 2012 Outbreak Festival. In March 2021, they toured the United Kingdom supporting the Acacia Strain alongside Hang the Bastard and TRC.

In 2012, their third studio album Scatter the Ashes was released, during this album's touring cycle, Jones departed from the band, citing that touring had led to the band becoming full time when he only wanted to ever do it part time. Louis Gauthier joined the band as their new vocalist, as did Craig Reynolds as drummer. In November 2013, the band then entered the Monnow Valley recording studio to record their next album. Suspension of Consciousness was then announced on 27 January 2014, and officially released on 7 April. On June, they played the 2013 Download Festival. Guitarist Ash Gray departed from the band in 2015 to form Venom Prison. and soon after Marc Richards rejoined the band on drums. On 8 February 2017, they released the music video for the single "Penitence", which was followed on 25 March 2017 by the release of their fifth studio album In Darkness. Their sixth album Misery Sequence was released on 13 September 2019. On 21 September 2021, the band announced they would be disbanding following a final tour during 2022.

== Musical style ==
Critics have categorised Brutality Will Prevail's music as metallic hardcore, sludge metal, tough guy hardcore, and heavy hardcore, often incorporating elements of doom metal, Southern rock, and post-rock. The band's early EPs made use of a tough guy hardcore style, before departing into a heavier, more sludge-influenced hardcore sound by the time of their debut album Forgotten Soul. Their songs are often feature slow tempos, groove-driven guitar riffs and anthemic vocal hooks.

They cited influences including Shipwreck A.D. and Rise and Fall.

== Members ==
Final lineup

- Louis Gauthier – vocals (2012–2022)
- Nick Rix – guitar (2008–2022)
- Jordan Murray – bass (2009–2022), guitar (2007–2009)
- Marc Richards – drums (2010–2012, 2015–2022)
- Adam Gent – guitar (2015–2022)

Former

- Gareth Arnold – vocals (2005)
- Dale Williams – bass (2005)
- Adam Evans – drums (2005–2007)
- James Goodman – guitar (2005–2008)
- Ajay Jones – vocals (2005–2012)
- Emlyn Lamb – bass (2005–2010)
- Richard "Dog" Dyas – drums (2007–2010)
- Ash Gray – guitar (2010–2015)
- Craig Reynolds – drums (2012–2015)

== Discography ==
Studio albums

- Forgotten Soul (2009)
- Root of All Evil (2010)
- Scatter the Ashes (2012)
- Suspension of Consciousness (2014)
- In Dark Places (2017)
- Misery Sequence (2019)

EPs

- Life Is Our War (2005)
- Never Turn Back (2006)
- South Wales Kings (2007)
- Brutality Will Prevail / Hang the Bastard (2010; split EP with Hang the Bastard)
- Sleep Paralysis (2011)
- Brutality Will Prevail / Ark of the Covenant (2011; split EP with Ark of the Covenant)
