= Fury of Five =

American hardcore band

- Origin: Asbury Park, New Jersey, U.S.
- Genres: Beatdown hardcore; metalcore; nu metal
- Years active: 1994–2000, 2010–present
- Labels: Victory; Century Media; Inner Rage
- Past members: James Ismean; Johnny Anger; Jay Fury; Chico Violencia; Mike Terror; Chris Rage; Mad Marc

Fury of Five (also commonly known as Fury of V) is an American hardcore punk band from Asbury Park, New Jersey.

== History ==
Fury of Five formed in 1994. Their early creative output limited to tracks on compilations, Fury of Five released two 7"s as well as a full-length album entitled No Reason to Smile in 1996. The band toured extensively throughout the Northeastern United States with bands such as Madball, Earth Crisis, and Fear Factory, and completed two European tours with Integrity and Pro-Pain. Two releases on Victory Records followed, which were At War with the World in 1998 and This Time It's Personal in 2000.

== Discography ==
=== Singles ===
- "Convicted and Condemned" 7" (1994)
- "Telling It Like It Is!" 7" (1995)
- "Real Is Back!" 7" (2014)

=== Demos ===
- The High Cost of Dying (1995)
- Reflections of Reality (1995)

=== Studio albums ===
- No Reason to Smile (1996)
- At War with the World (1998)
- This Time It's Personal (2000)
- Half past revenge (2023)
- Bloodstorm (2024)

=== Compilations ===
- Jersey Style (2007)
- Fast Break! Records Sampler (2014)

=== Music videos ===
- Do or Die – At War with the World
- Taking Respect – At War with the World
