= Birch Hill Nightclub =

Music venue and nightclub in Old Bridge Township, New Jersey, U.S.

Coordinates: 40.3951°N 74.3086°W

Birch Hill Nightclub was a music venue and nightclub in Old Bridge Township, New Jersey. The venue ran into trouble in 2000 after an accidental drowning and drug raids, along with a loss of their liquor license. Birch Hill was sold in 2003 and is now a housing development. Big-name bands including Gov't Mule, Dio, Scorpions, Hoobastank, Blue Öyster Cult, Cheap Trick, UFO, Iron Maiden, Rainbow, Eve 6, Kittie, Someday Never, Toadies, Sudzert and Slayer played the venue.
