= Bulldoze (band) =

American hardcore band

- Origin: Irvington, New Jersey, U.S.
- Genre: Beatdown hardcore
- Years active: 1992–1996, 2010–present
- Labels: Time; Hardway
- Members: George Puda; Zack Thorne; Mike Milewski; Chris Golas
- Past members: Kevin Cea

Bulldoze is an American beatdown hardcore band formed in Irvington, New Jersey in 1992. Originating from thrash metal band Retribution, Bulldoze's mid-tempo, heavy metal-inspired take on hardcore punk developed the beatdown hardcore genre. They have released a single studio album, The Final Beatdown (1996), along with the Remember Whose Strong (1994) EP and Cleaning Shit Up!! (1993) demo.

== History ==
Bulldoze has its origins in Irvington, New Jersey thrash metal band Retribution which featured bassist and vocalist George Puda, guitarists Zack Thorne and Mike Milewski and drummer Chris Golas. After seeing Mucky Pup and Leeway at the Cricket Club in Irvington, and befriending the members of Biohazard and Life of Agony, Retribution began changing their style towards hardcore. In 1992, Puda decided he wished to quit the band's vocal duties and instead only play bass. In his place, the band recruited Biohazard roadie Kevin "Kevone" Cea on vocals, whom Golas had met during the filming of Biohazard's "Punishment" music video, and changed their name to Bulldoze. The band's first live performance was an impromptu set at Studio One in the middle of NJ Bloodline's set when they were opening for Dog Eat Dog.

Due to the violence of their live performances and Cea's frequent criminal activities, Bulldoze were banned from many of the prominent venues in New Jersey's hardcore scene including Studio One, the Cricket Club and the Pipeline. This, along with the growing split within the band, where Puda, Thorne, Golas and Milewski wished to play more melodic and faster music, while Cea wanted to play heavier metal-influenced music led to the band deciding to disband in 1995. Following Bulldoze's disbandment Puda, Thorne, Golas and Milewski formed Train of Thought with bassist Larry Chiswick, and Cea began pursuing his side project Terror Zone full time. Soon after Cea was incarcerated.

On August 14, 2010, they performed at This is Hardcore Festival. On December 18, 2012, they rereleased The Final Beatdown with their demo, EP, two songs from compilation appearances and an hour of live footage. On May 24, 2013, they played in Copenhagen with support from Ruined, Cutdown and No Second Thought. On September 2, 2022, the band announced that Cea had died. Because of this, Puda moved to vocals during the band's subsequent live performances. In January 2022, they played FYA Festival in Tampa, Florida. On May 12, 2023, they performed at the 2023 Black N' Blue Bowl in New York City.

== Musical style and legacy ==
Bulldoze's take on hardcore is slow and influenced by heavy metal and hip hop. They make frequent use of breakdowns, heavy grooves and disses. They have cited influences including Metallica, Judge, Black Sabbath, Carnivore, Youth of Today, Gorilla Biscuits and Van Halen.

Bulldoze pioneered the beatdown hardcore genre, with their 1996 album The Final Beatdown giving the genre its name. NoEcho writer Carlos Ramirez called them "perhaps the biggest influence on the breakdown-heavy hardcore bands that came after them in the mid-'90s and beyond". They have also been cited as an influence by Trapped Under Ice.

== Members ==
- George Puda – vocals (2022–present), bass (1992–1995, 2010–present)
- Zack Thorne – guitar (1992–1995, 2010–present)
- Mike Milewski – guitar (1992–1995, 2010–present)
- Chris Golas – drums (1992–1995, 2010–present)

Former

- Kevin "Kevone" Cea– vocals (1992–1995, 2012–2022; his death)

== Discography ==
Albums

- The Final Beatdown (1996)

EPs

- Remember Who's Strong (1994)

Demos

- Cleaning Shit Up!! (1993)
