= Cold as Life =

American hardcore band

- Origin: Detroit, Michigan, U.S.
- Genres: Beatdown hardcore, metalcore
- Years active: 1988–2001, 2007, 2015–present
- Labels: CTYC Productions, +/- Records, A389 Recordings
- Members: Jeff Gunnells; Craig Holloway; Matt Martin; John Music; Jesse Wright
- Past members: Roy Bates; Jeff West; Rodney "Rawn Beauty" Barger; Jay Wade; Jake Loch; Jason Navarro; Jason Clifton; Johnny Hate; The Big Dog; Mike Couls; Tim Mycek; Enzo D Jake Bulldog; Emery "E-War" Keathley

Cold as Life is an American hardcore band based in Detroit, Michigan, formed in 1988. Lyrical themes consisted of brutal depictions of the horrors of growing up and living in a city plagued with corruption, murder, drugs, depression and poverty, along with the tragedy of losing friends, family and bandmates to murder and drug abuse. Their shows were frequently violent, involving vicious fights that often included stabbings and beatings with various weapons. However, Cold as Life has a large "family" based following. Stories of these shows would spread throughout the Midwest punk and hardcore communities, contributing to the band's notoriety. Cold as Life drew musical influence from such bands as Negative Approach, Sheer Terror, Discharge, 4 Skins, Cro-Mags, Black Sabbath, and Slayer.

== History ==
In early 2007, a reunion tour was organized by former members but featured Enzo D and Jake Bulldog (of fellow Detroit band Dogz of War) on vocals and Guitar instead of co-founder Jeff Gunnells.

On June 4, 2013, Jeff Gunnells was sentenced to between 10 and 20 years in prison for armed robbery.

Cold as Life reformed once again in 2015 and have played sporadically since.

In 2021 the band's first record "Born To Land Hard" was released on vinyl for the first time through A389 Recordings.

The band officially re-united in October 2023, playing a reunion show in their hometown of Detroit together with bands like Madball, Integrity and Terror. The band now consists of Jeff Gunnells (vocals and guitar), bassist Craig Holloway, guitarists Matt Martin and John Music, and drummer Jesse Wright.

2023 also saw the re-release of their second album "Declination of Independence" on A389 Recordings. The record got remixed and remastered by Taylor Young and Brad Boatright. That same year Cold as Life released an album with recordings stretching from 1988 to 1993 called "In Memory Of Rodney A. Barger 1970–1993".

A fugitive wanted for the 1993 murder of band member Rodney Barger was captured in Panama in 2026.

== Discography ==
=== Studio albums ===
- 1998: Born to Land Hard (CTYC Productions, +/- Records)
- 2000: Declination of Independence (CTYC Productions)

=== Splits ===
- 2001: Split with Ringworm (Stillborn Records)

=== Demos ===
- 1989: 1989 Demo
- 1991: 1991 Demo
- 1992: 1992 Demo
- 1995: 1995 Demo
- 1997: 1997 Demo

=== Compilation albums ===
- 2004: 1988–1993 (CTYC Productions)
- 2023: In Memory Of Rodney A. Barger 1970–1993 (A389 Recordings)

=== Non-album tracks ===
- 1996: Detroit Is Distraught Compilation 1996 – "How Much Longer"
- 1997: Feisty Cadavers and the Brotherhood (Idol Records) – "Live Like Vampires"
- 1999: Only the Strong Survive: 1999 (Victory Records) – "My Own Worst Enemy"
- 1999: The Spirit Lives On: A Tribute to Raybeez and Warzone (Hate Core Records) – "Fight the Opressor"
- 2007: United States of Hardcore (Hate Core Records) – "Pete's Sake (S.O.I.A.)"

== See also ==
- Music of Detroit#Hardcore punk
