= Lionheart (American band) =

American hardcore band

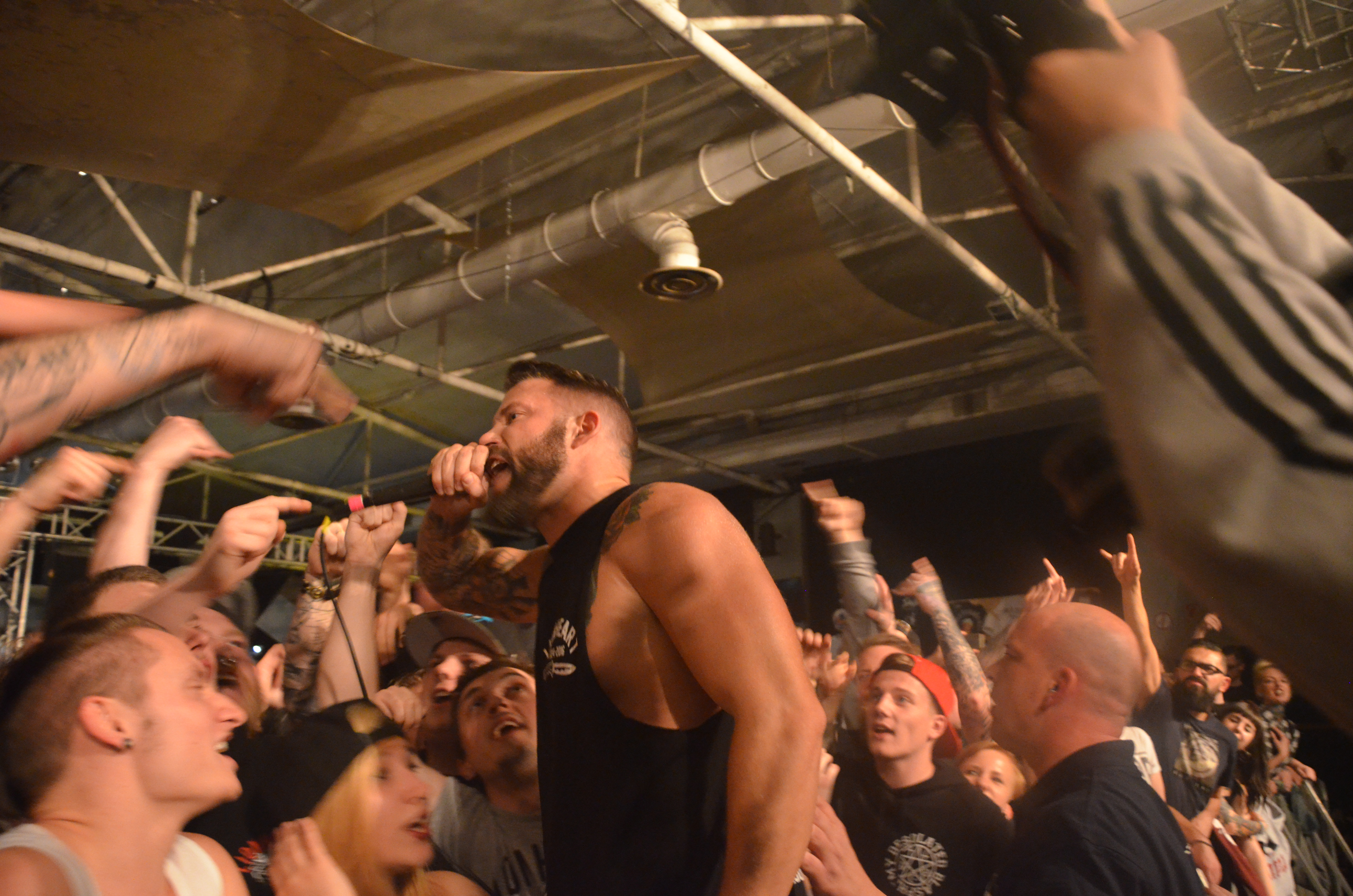
- Lionheart performing in October 2016

Background information
- Origin: Oakland, California, U.S.
- Genres: Beatdown hardcore, metalcore, tough guy hardcore
- Years active: 2004–2016, 2017–present
- Labels: Stillborn, I Scream, Mediaskare, Fast Break, Beatdown Hardwear, Arising Empire
- Members: Rob Watson; Walle Etzel; Nick Warner; Richard Mathews; Jay Scott; Cameron Grabowski
- Website: Lionheart on Facebook

Lionheart is an American beatdown hardcore band from Oakland, California.

== History ==
Formed in 2004 in Oakland, California, Lionheart consists out of vocalist Rob Watson, guitarists Evan Krejci and Rob McCarthy, as well of bassist Chad Hall (currently in "Wear the Crown" – a heavy metal / hardcore band formed in 2017) and drummer Jay Scott after several line-up changes.

The band released their debut record The Will to Survive on September 2, 2007, via Stillborn Records and I Scream Records which got re-released with bonus materials two years later. After signing a record deal with Mediaskare Records Lionheart released their second studio album Built on Struggle on January 8, 2011. A year and a half later, on May 8, 2012, the follow-up album Undisputed was released again on Mediaskare. An EP Welcome to the West Coast was released on January 14, 2014, via Fast Break Entertainment.

Between July and September 2011 Lionheart toured together with I Declare War. Between January 20–31, 2012 the band toured Europe during the Persistence Tour alongside Biohazard and Suicidal Tendencies. In July the same year a Northern American tour followed with Thick as Blood. The band should have played Europe during that time but the concert tour got cancelled. The band drew criticism from some fans after they confirmed playing a show with Motionless in White in Hawaii. The band stated that it was only one concert. In the beginning of 2015 the band toured Europa as participant of the Taste of Anarchy Tour with Nasty and German Beatdown band Coldburn. The band played some mid-sized festivals in summer 2005 including Ieperfest in Belgium, Traffic Jam Open Air and Summerblast Festival, both located in Germany. The festival appearances were part of a second Europe tour in Europe in 2015 where the band shared stage with bands like Death by Stereo, H_{2}O, Born from Pain, 7 Seconds and First Blood.

In the beginning of 2016 the band released their fourth studio album called Love Don't Live Here via German-based label Beatdown Hardwear Records. On May 26, 2016, the band announced their break-up. Five days after that announcement Lionheart announced the dates of their Farewell Tour in Europe, which included appearances on festivals like With Full Force, Vainstream Rockfest and the Free & Easy Festival all located in Germany. Even so, Lionheart played shows in Serbia and Greece for the first time. On August 12, 2016, it was announced that the Farewell Tour will be expanded so the band will play their last concert in Germany on November 5, 2016, in Chemnitz.

After about a year disbanding, on Facebook the band announced that they had reunited.

== Musical style ==
The music of Lionheart's first album was described as hardcore punk-rooted metalcore, and compared with Hatebreed. The musical style is comparable with Terror and Settle the Score. Lionheart uses musical elements of beatdown hardcore and two-step in their sound. One more musical influence is Cro-Mags. Overall, Lionheart is categorized as a mixture of hardcore punk and heavy metal.

The band is known for their aggressive sound which can be compared with First Blood and Blood Stands Still.

== Band members ==
Lionheart live at With Full Force 2018

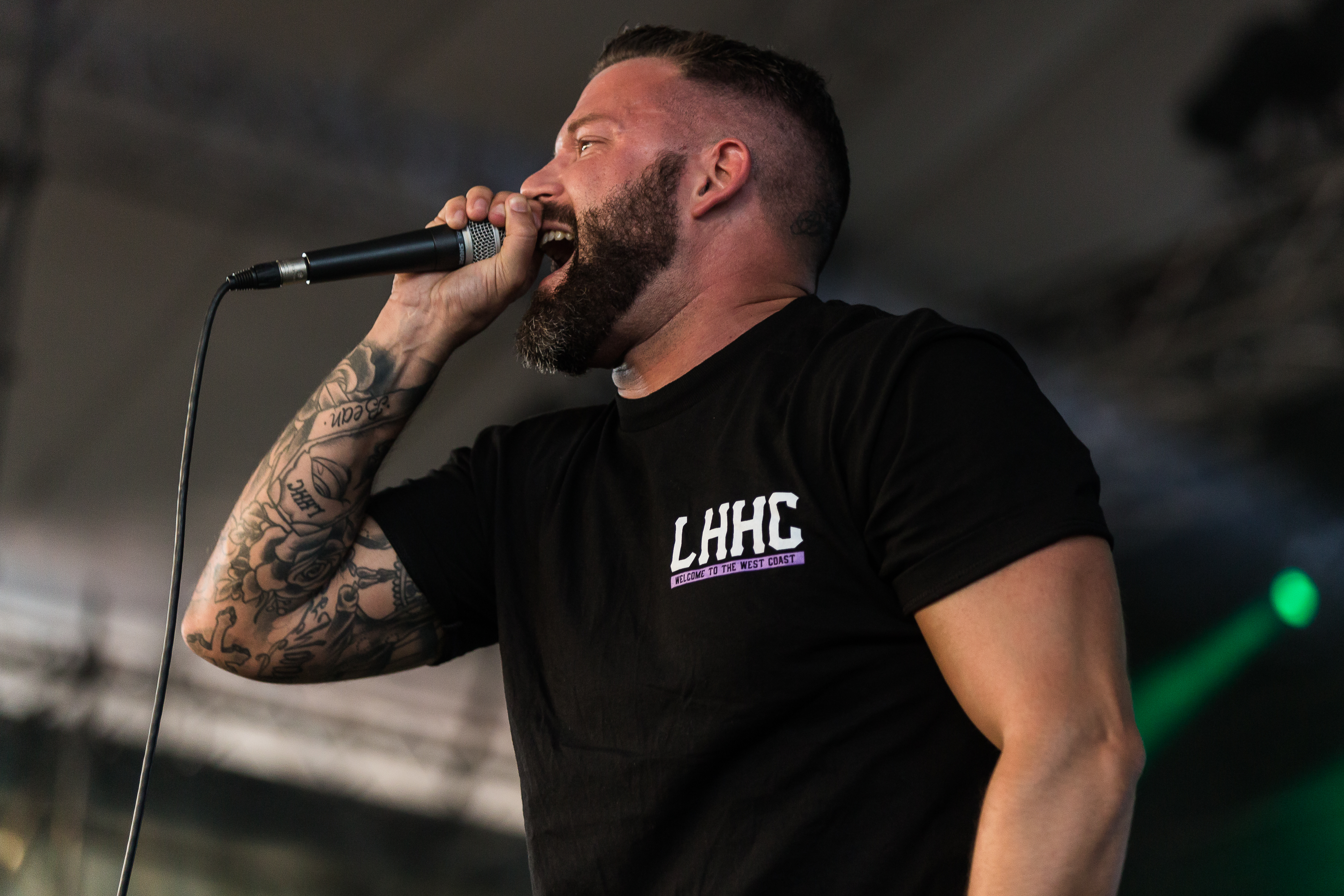
Singer Rob Watson

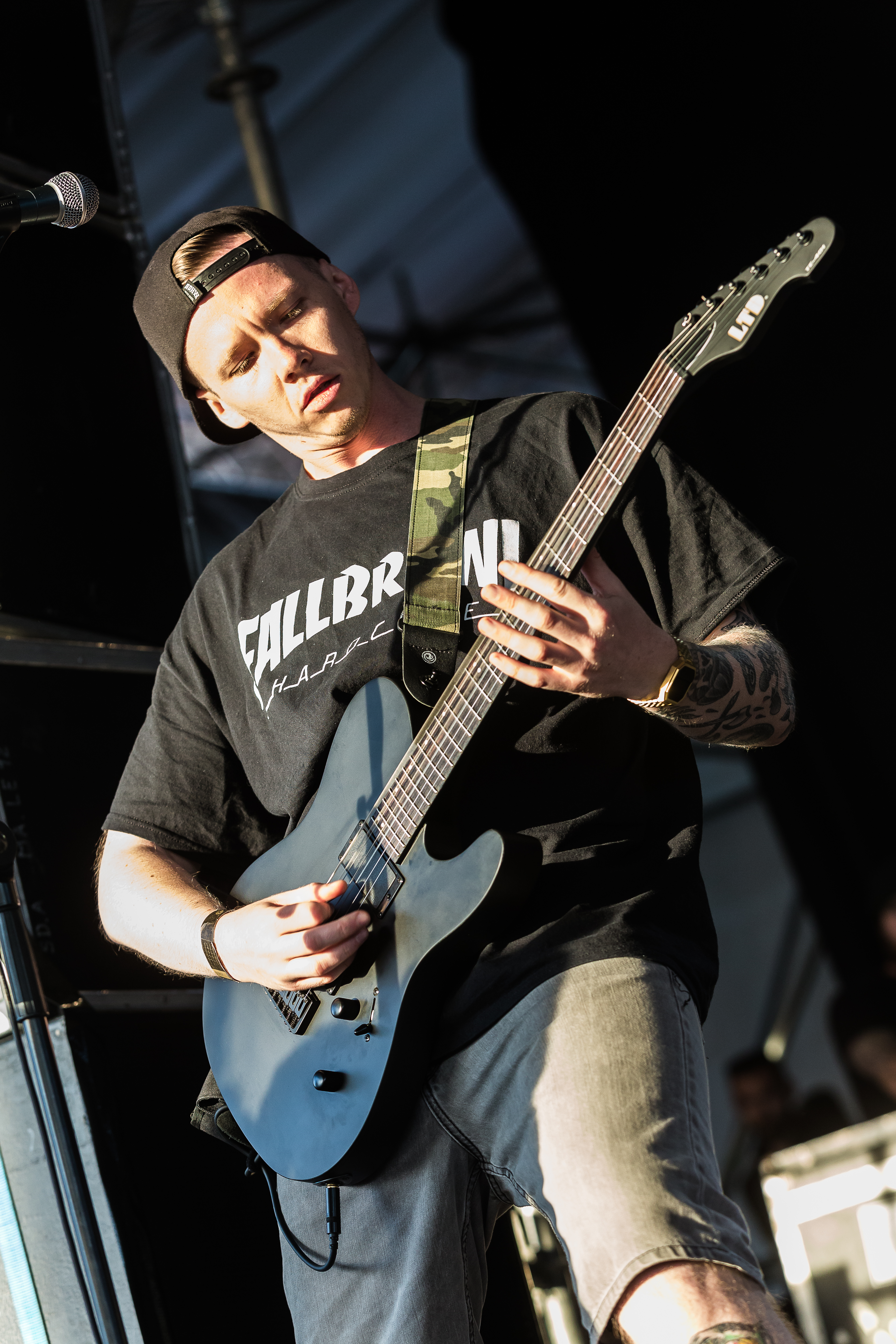
Guitarist Walle Etzel

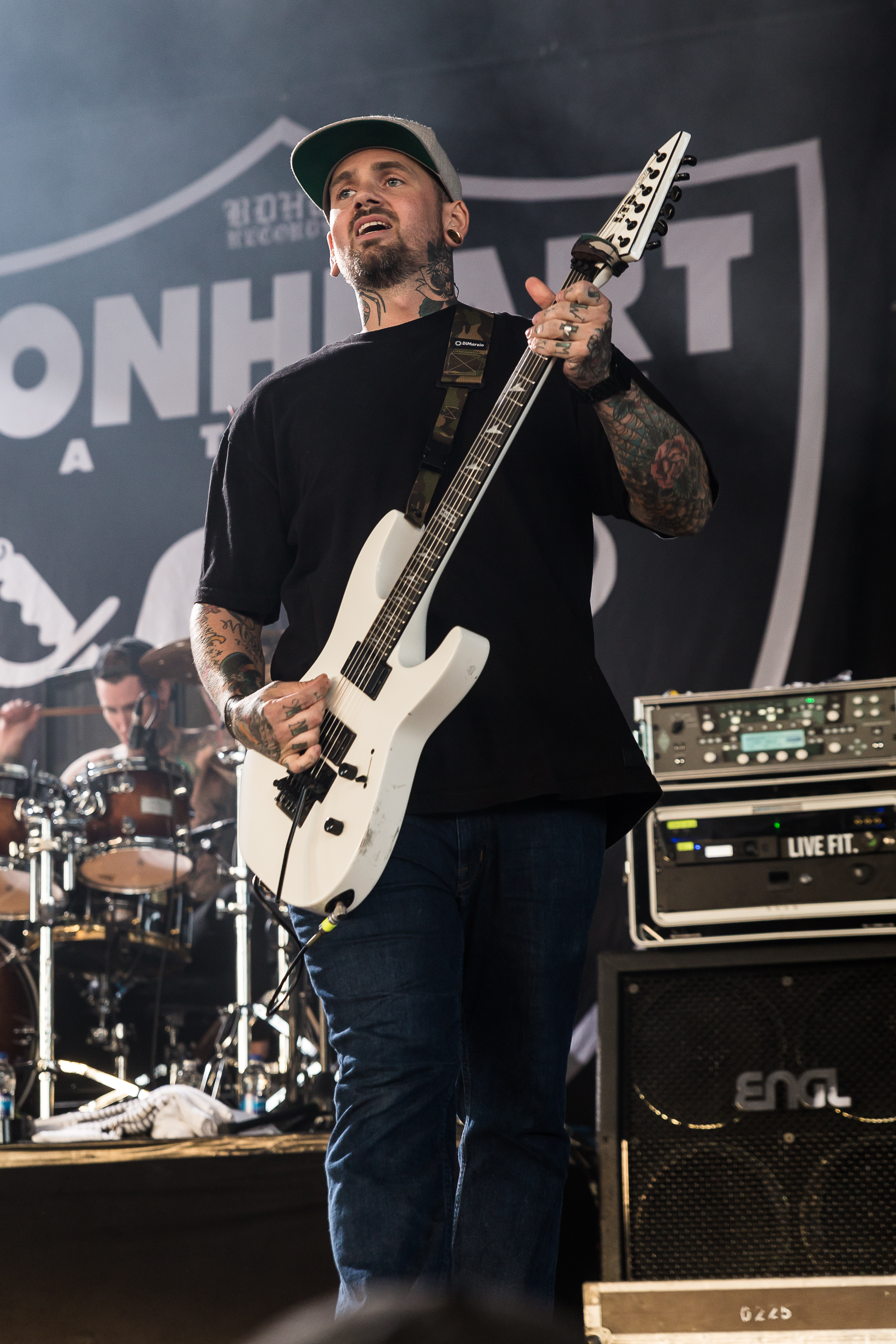
Guitarist Nik Warner

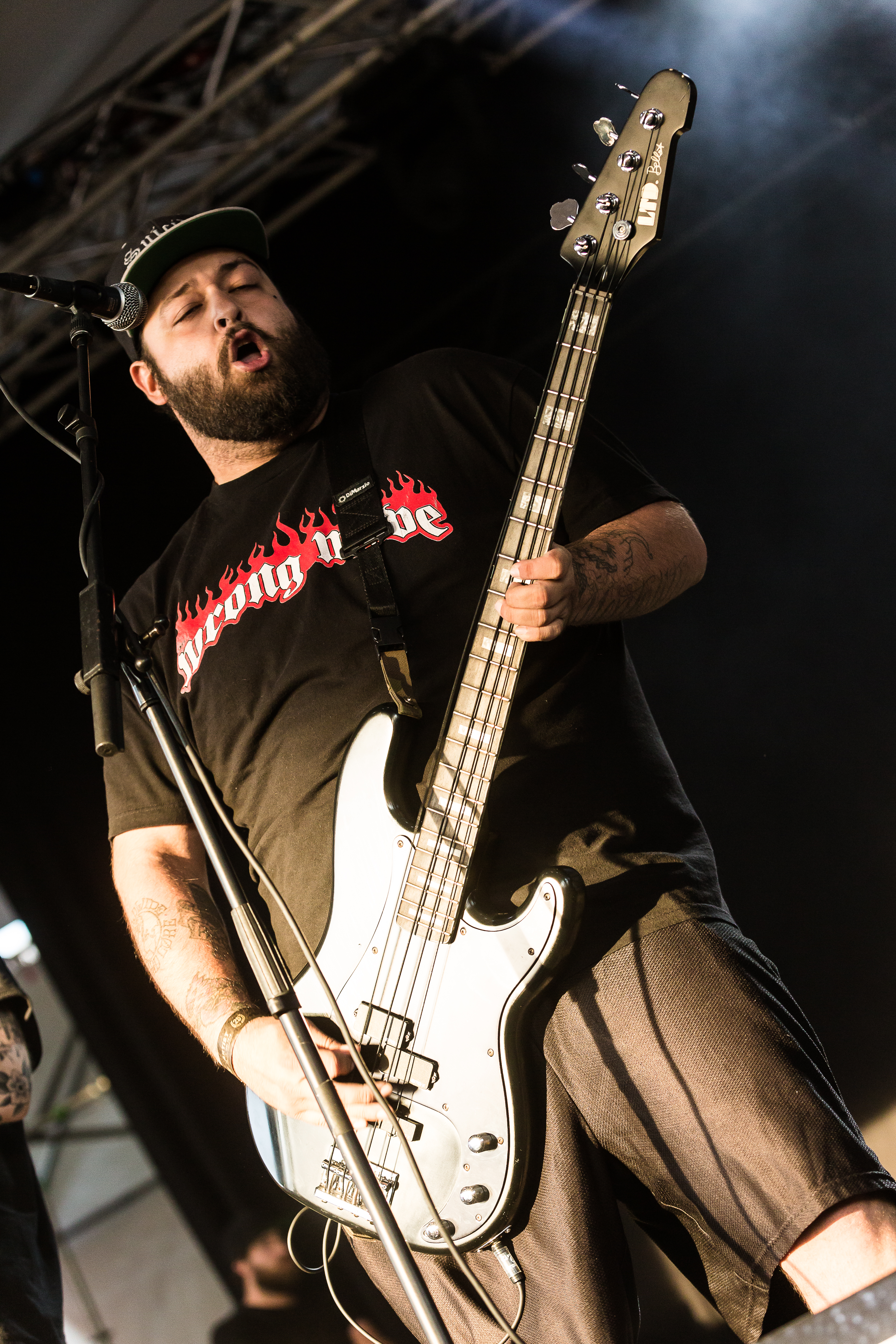
Bassist Richard Mathews

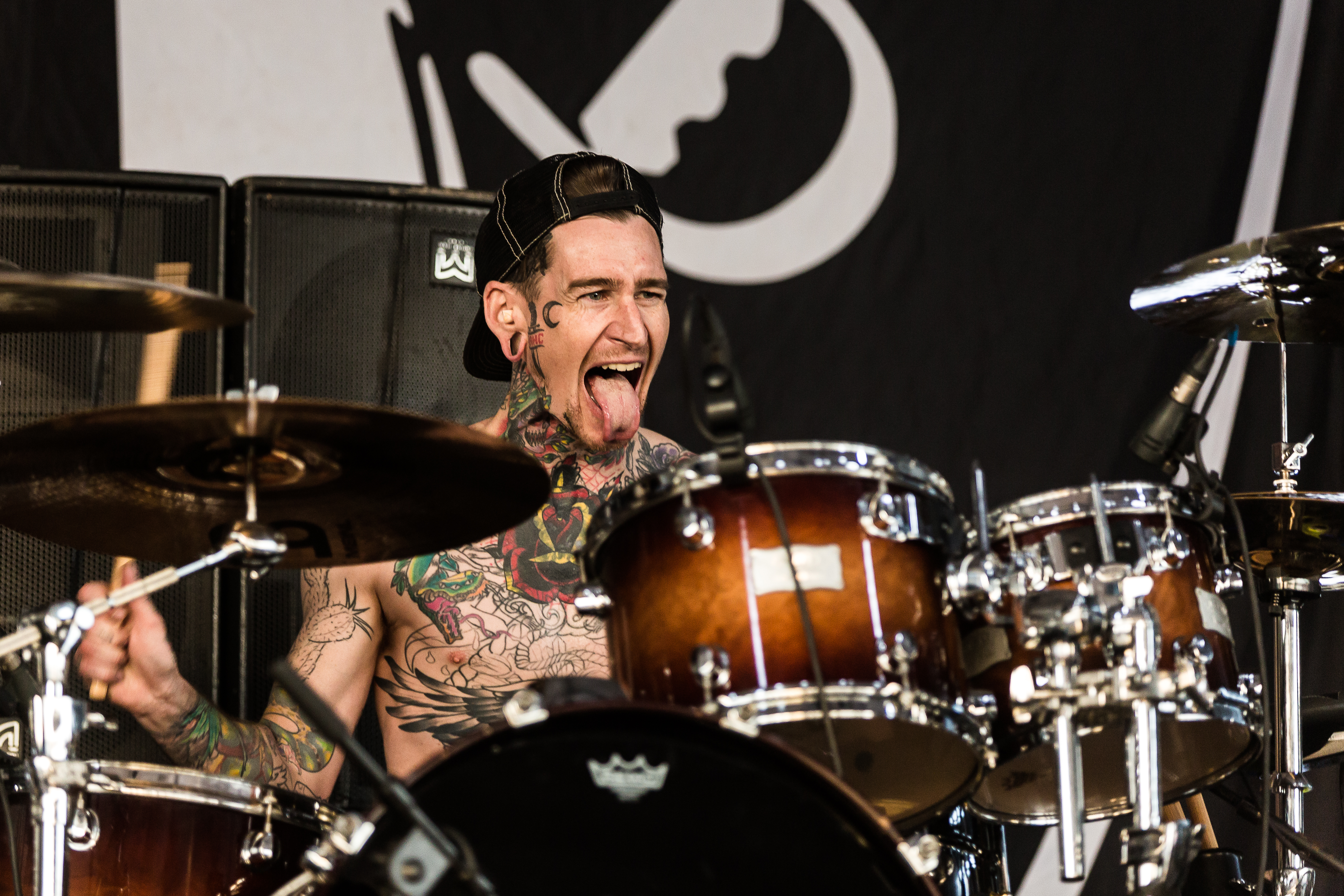
Drummer Jay Scott

== Discography ==
- 2006: This Means War (EP, I Scream Records)
- 2007: The Will to Survive (Album, Westcoast Worldwide Records, re-released in 2008 via I Scream Records along with This Means War EP)
- 2011: Built on Struggle (Album, Mediaskare Records)
- 2012: Undisputed (Album, Mediaskare Records)
- 2014: Welcome to the West Coast (EP, Fast Break Entertainment)
- 2016: Love Don't Live Here (Album, LHHC Records, BDHW Records)
- 2017: Welcome to the West Coast II
- 2019: Valley of Death
- 2020: Live At Summer Breeze (Live Album 2020 on Arising Empire)
- 2022: Welcome to the West Coast III
- 2026: Valley of Death II
