= Xibalba (band) =

American hardcore band

- Origin: Pomona, California, U.S.
- Genres: Hardcore punk; beatdown hardcore; metalcore; death metal
- Years active: 2007–present
- Labels: Southern Lord, A389, BDHW, Closed Casket Activities
- Members: Nate Rebolledo; Brian Ortiz; Jason Brunes; Jensen Hucle; Martín Stewart

Xibalba is an American band from Pomona, California, formed in 2007. They play hardcore, metalcore and death metal with influences from doom metal, with lyrics in English and Spanish.

== History ==
The band started in 2007 in Pomona, California, when longtime friends Nate, Brian, Jason and Bryan wanted to play dark and heavy music with eccentric influences. The friends performed together in hardcore punk bands prior to forming Xibalba.

Their debut album, Madre Mia Gracias Por Los Dias (2010), was released through A389 Recordings. Their second album, Hasta La Muerte (2012), was released by Southern Lord.

In 2012, the band went on an Australian tour with Warbrain and Incendiary. In 2013, they traveled with the "No Way Out" U.S. tour with headliners The Acacia Strain, and Within the Ruins, Fit for an Autopsy, and American Me. Xibalba also toured on the "Die Knowing" U.S. tour alongside Comeback Kid, Backtrack, Downpresser, and To the Wind.

== Members ==
=== Current members ===
- Jason Brunes – drums, backing vocals (2007–present)
- Jensen Huncle – guitar (2007–present)
- Brian Ortiz – guitar, backing vocals (2007–present)
- Nate Rebolledo – lead vocals (2007–present)

=== Former members ===
- Mike Salazar – guitar (2014–2015)
- Bryan Valdvia – bass (2007–2014)

== Discography ==
=== Studio albums ===
- Madre mía gracias por los días (2010)
- Hasta la muerte (2012)
- Tierra y libertad (2015)
- Años en infierno (2020)

=== Extended plays ===
- Diablo, Con Amor.. Adios. (2017)
- Aztlán (2023)

=== Splits ===
- Earthquake Split (2010)
- Split with Incendiary (2011)
- Split with Suburban Scum (2014)

=== Demos ===
- Place of Fear (2007)
