= Beatdown hardcore =

Heavy metal-oriented offshoot of hardcore punk

- Other names: Brutal hardcore; moshcore; heavy hardcore
- Stylistic origins: Tough guy hardcore; thrash metal; hip hop
- Cultural origins: Mid-1990s, New York City and New Jersey
- Typical instruments: Vocals; electric guitar; bass guitar; drums
- Derivative forms: Nu metal; sass

Local scenes
- Boston, New York

Other topics
- Groove metal; metalcore; moshing; sludge metal; nu metalcore; rapcore

Beatdown hardcore (also known as heavy hardcore, brutal hardcore, moshcore, or simply beatdown) is a subgenre of hardcore punk which incorporates elements of thrash metal and hip hop. The genre features aggressive vocals, heavy, palm muted guitar riffs and breakdowns. The genre has its origins in late 1980s tough guy hardcore bands such as Breakdown, Killing Time, and Madball, and was pioneered in the mid-1990s by bands like Bulldoze, Terror Zone, and Neglect. The definition of the genre has expanded over time to incorporate artists increasingly indebted to metal, notably Xibalba, Sunami, and Knocked Loose. Later acts also feature slam death metal riffs.

== Characteristics ==
Beatdown makes use of low pitched, shouted vocals, downtuned guitars and thrash metal–inspired drum rhythms, putting a particular emphasis on breakdowns. Many bands make use of palm muted guitar riffs, influenced by slam death metal, in conjunction with hip hop-influenced vocals. According to Bandcamp Daily writer Kevin Warwick, after the 1990s the genre expanded from a specific style of metal-influenced hardcore to "encompass a larger variety of mosh-friendly, breakdown-fixated groups", which includes both 1990s-style hardcore revivalists like Absolute Suffering and more metallic groups like Knocked Loose. With this progression, influence from death metal and doom metal became increasingly prevalent with MetalSucks writer Max Heilman calling slam riffs "a staple of modern beatdown". Subsequently, the genre's borders have become increasingly blurred with those of metalcore and deathcore.

One prominent characteristic of beatdown is its close association to hardcore crews particularly New York's DMS and Boston's Friends Stand United, to the extent that academic Jeff Purchla used the term "crew scene hardcore" to refer to the genre in his 2011 essay The Powers that be: Processes of Control in 'Crew Scene Hardcore'. Sociology academic Edgar M. Peralta defined crews as being people involved in hardcore scene who unify "based on reciprocal ties and varying interests, including non-criminal elements such as music or sports, but also including some criminal elements, which often include violence and graffiti", specifically originating as a means to oppose the white supremacist currents in their scenes.

Beatdown bands often make use of hip hop–inspired imagery, with logos being based on graffiti designs and band members wearing sagged pants and baseball caps on irregular angles.

== History ==
=== Predecessors ===
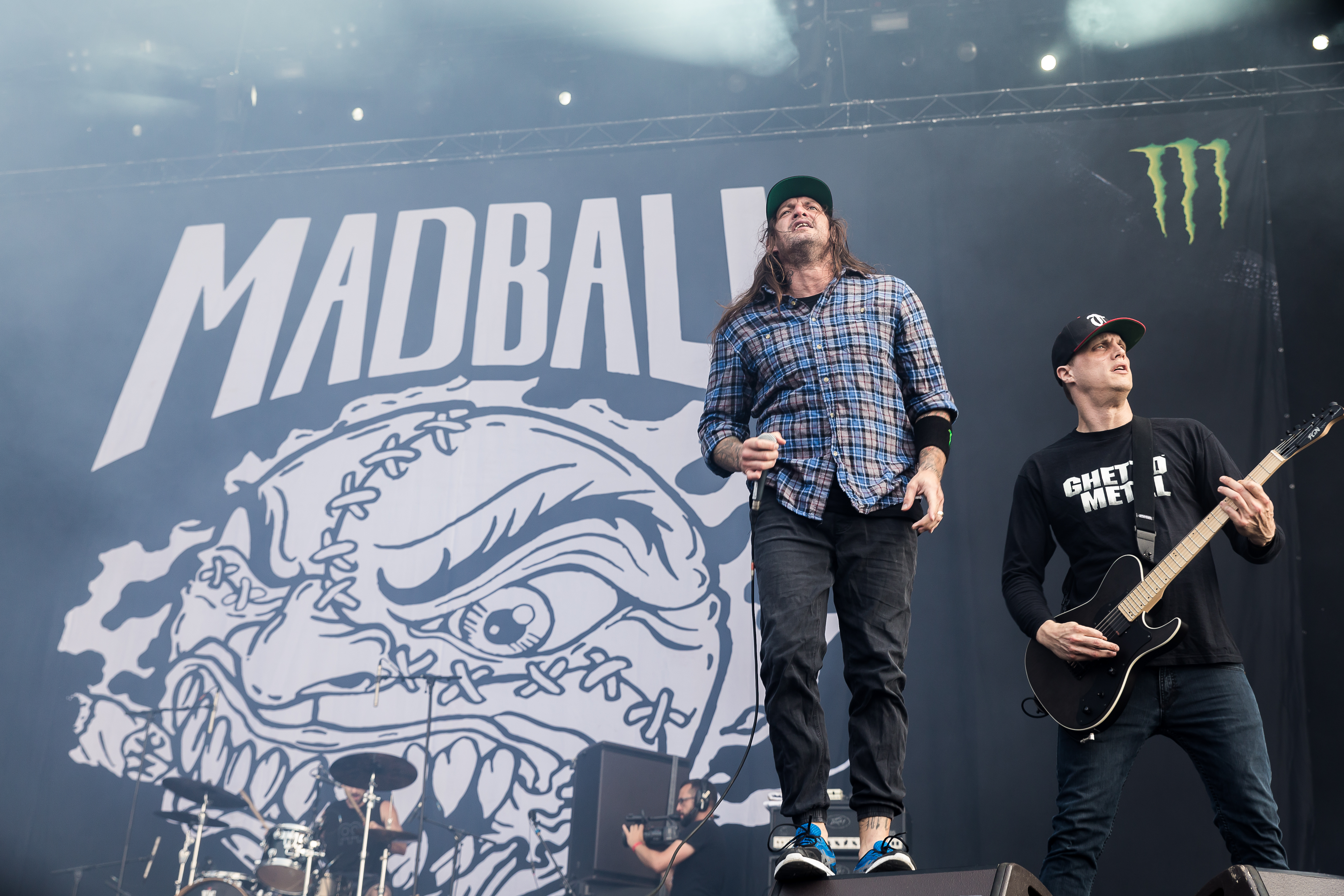
Madball were one of the earliest hardcore bands to merge masculine, street-wise lyrics with metal-influenced grooves.

Beatdown's origins are particularly tied to the Lower East Side hardcore crew DMS (Doc Marten Skinheads). Formed in the early 1980s by Jere DMS, the crew's embrace of elements of hardcore, hip-hop, graffiti, motorcycle, skinhead, and skateboarding culture, and multi-ethnic membership led to it including members who would go on to form bands including Bulldoze, Madball, and Skarhead. The way in which DMS bands would sometimes discuss their crew's brotherhood and criminal activities would play a key role in developing the lyrical themes of beatdown.

Beatdown originated from the earlier tough guy hardcore sound. One of the earliest tough guy bands was Breakdown from Yonkers, New York. Formed in 1987, they were a part of a new wave of New York hardcore bands similarly expanding the scope of the genre, like Sick of It All, Sheer Terror, and Krakdown. That same year, Judge released their debut EP New York Crew, which Crack magazine described as the record that took New York's "tough guy mentality to new heights". Killing Time's 1989 debut album Brightside was a key step in New York, by making use of the heaviness of thrash metal while sidelining metal's camp and creating beatdown style groove parts in songs like "New Release". Furthermore, Madball's emphasis on heavy grooves and lack of reliance on the speed which defined earlier hardcore, became the characterizing sound of New York hardcore in the 1990s and birthed beatdown.

=== Origins (mid-1990s) ===
Beatdown was pioneered by Bulldoze, with their 1996 album The Final Beatdown giving the genre its name. Bulldoze, along with Terror Zone, merged the sound of earlier New York hardcore with heavy breakdowns and lyrics revolving around themes such as gang activity to set the template for the genre. In their wake followed groups like Next Step Up, Neglect, Confusion, and Grimlock. The genre took a particular hold on the New Jersey hardcore scene at the time, with venues including Melody Bar, the Stone Pony, and Birch Hill Nightclub frequently playing host to bands like Clubber Lang, Signed with Hate, and Force of Aggression. NoEcho writer Chris Suffer called New Jersey beatdown band Shattered Realm's 2002 album " Broken Ties... Spoken Lies "the standard for which all future beatdown style hardcore should try to live up to but not expect to come anywhere close". Two of the most prominent groups were in this scene were E.Town Concrete and Fury of Five.

In 1996, a hardcore scene in London began around the informal collective "LBU" (London Black Up), which include bands like Knuckledust, Ninebar and Bun Dem Out. Bands in this scene often incorporated elements of grime, hip hop, and metal into their sounds and was based around venues such as the Camden Underworld, New Cross Inn, and the Dome in Tufnell Park.

In the following years beatdown's ignorant take on heavy riffing would prove particularly influential on the sound of nu metal. Furthermore, Hatebreed formed in Bridgeport, Connecticut in 1994, merging classic hardcore with beatdown and metalcore. Their 1997 debut album Satisfaction Is the Death of Desire sold over 150,000 copies. By the beginning of the 2000s, the genre was declining in popularity, with the dominant style of hardcore having become more metallic, and many bands adopting this style being signed to Victory Records.

=== Developments (2000s–present) ===
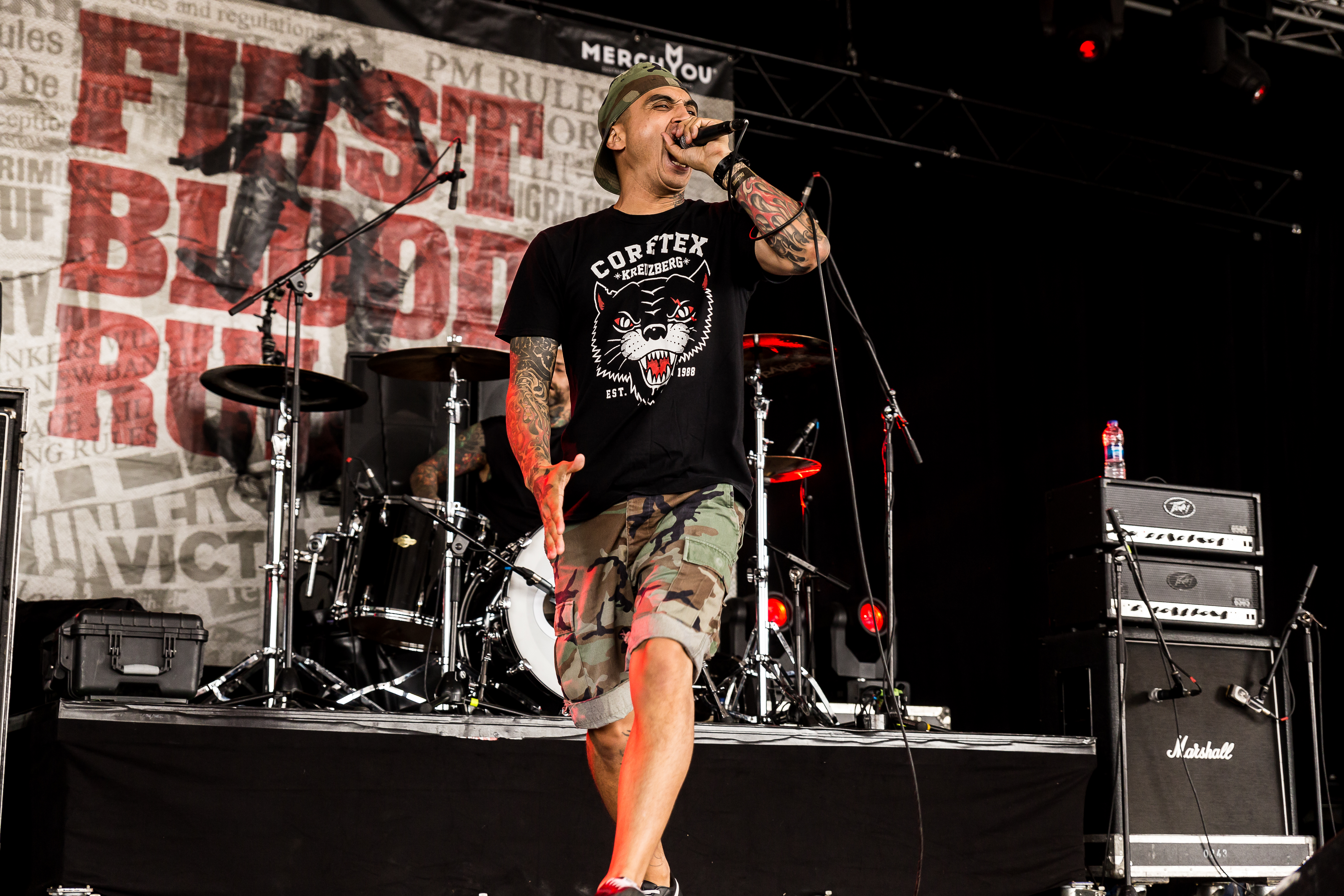
Carl Schwartz, vocalist of San Francisco beatdown band First Blood

Baltimore-based Trapped Under Ice and their 2007 demo, the cover photo of which featured the members aggressively posing, re-popularised the tough guy hardcore aesthetic and beatdown hardcore sound by incorporated polished production, danceable rhythms, and more melodic and experimental aspects into the genre. The band's Chad Gilbert-produced second album Big Kiss Goodnight (2011) was one of the most influential hardcore albums of its time, with Stereogum writer Tom Breiham stating in a 2023 article that "it's been years since we've gotten a new Trapped Under Ice song, but that band's influence looms large over the entire hardcore landscape today."

As the genre progressed, it became increasingly influenced by metal, often death metal and doom metal, an aspect particularly prominent in groups like Kruelty, Xibalba, and No Zodiac. In the 2010s, the Lancashire, England-based band Gassed Up made a name for themselves by putting a greater emphasis on the genre's hip hop influence. This helped to establish what Metal Injection referred to as the "UK style" of beatdown, which was continued as the decade progressed by Street Soldier and Recount.

Beatdown experienced a surge in popularity in the 2020s, Malevolence became one of the most prominent bands in the genre, incorporating themselves further into the heavy metal scene and embracing the influence of groove metal and sludge metal, and Enemy Mind became increasingly indebted to death metal. Beatdown band Sunami formed in 2019, originally a parody of the genre's violent ignorance, the attention the band received during the COVID-19 lockdowns, particularly on TikTok, led to them selling out the majority of their live performances in the following years. A 2023 article by Revolver credited them as "in the upper echelon of bands dominating the hardcore zeitgeist". Other prominent bands in the genre at this time were Pain of Truth and Never Ending Game.

== See also ==
- List of beatdown hardcore bands
- Groove metal
- Moshing
- Sludge metal
