= Vomit Forth =

American death metal band

- Origin: Pittsfield, Massachusetts, U.S.
- Genres: Brutal death metal
- Years active: 2018–present
- Labels: Maggot Stomp, Century Media, Pure Noise
- Members: Kane Gelaznik; Ricky Brayall; Bailey Olinger; Jett Stotts; Luke Zeitler
- Past members: Tyler Bidwell; Nick Herrmann

Vomit Forth is an American death metal band from Pittsfield, Massachusetts, formed in 2018.

== History ==
The band released two demos and two EPs independently before getting signed to a record label and going on a North American tour with Frozen Soul, Sanguisugabogg, and Inoculation. On May 7, 2022, the band announced their debut album, entitled Seething Malevolence. It was released on July 8, 2022, receiving positive reviews. Singles and music videos were released for the songs "Predatory Savior", "Carnivorous Incantation", "Seething Malevolence", and "Pain Tolerance".

From 2022 to 2024, the group embarked on massive touring. In September 2022, they supported Creeping Death in that band's North American tour, alongside bands like 200 Stab Wounds and Tribal Gaze. Vomit Forth went on their own North American tour with Simulakra and Snuffed on Sight in October, with Genocide Pact and No/Más in November, and with Upon Stone in March 2023. In April, they supported The Last Ten Seconds of Life in that band's North American tour, alongside Cell, Mugshot and Tactosa. In May, Vomit Forth originally planned to support The Acacia Strain in the premiere shows for that band's album Step into the Light, but they were replaced by Year of the Knife. In June, Vomit Forth supported Ingested in that band's North American tour, alongside Devourment, Extermination Dismemberment, and Organechtomy. In July and August, Vomit Forth supported Sanguisugabogg in that band's North American tour, alongside Kruelty, Gates to Hell, Deterioration, and Deadbody. In November, Vomit Forth supported Pain of Truth in that band's North American tour, alongside Ingrown. In March 2024, Vomit Forth supported Cattle Decapitation in that band's European tour, alongside 200 Stab Wounds and Signs of the Swarm, which includes the 2024 edition of Inferno Metal Festival. Finally, in April and May 2024, Vomit Forth supported Gates to Hell in that band's North American tour, alongside Corpse Pile.

Vomit Forth vocalist Kane Gelaznik has guest appeared in singles from other bands such as "Gouging" by Dissected, "24 Thorns" by Mugshot, and the Bayonet Dismemberment EP Carnage of War. On September 18, 2024, Vomit Forth announced their second album Terrified of God. It was released on October 11, 2024, receiving positive feedback. Singles and music videos were released for the songs "Blood Soaked Death Dream", "Negative Penance", and "Salt".

More touring was announced for Vomit Forth through late 2024 and 2025. In October and November 2024, they supported The Black Dahlia Murder in that band's North American tour, alongside Spite and AngelMaker, starting with a performance at The Rave/Eagles Club that also includes Dying Fetus. Vomit Forth went on their own North American tour with No Cure and Cemented in Fear in December. In March 2025, Vomit Forth is currently taking part in Get the Shot's European tour, alongside Half Me and Soulprison. Vomit Forth will participate in the 'Chaos & Carnage Tour' in April and May, with bands Dying Fetus, Cradle of Filth, Fleshgod Apocalypse, Ne Obliviscaris, Undeath, and Corpse Pile.

== Members ==
Current

- Kane Gelaznik – vocals (2018–present)
- Ricky Brayall – guitars (2018–present)
- Bailey Olinger – guitars (2022–present)
- Jett Stotts – bass (2022–present)
- Luke Zeitler – drums (2022–present)

Former

- Tyler Bidwell – bass, guitars (2018–2022)
- Nick Herrmann – drums (2018–2022)

== Discography ==
- Northeastern Deprivation (EP compilation) (August 21, 2019)

Northeastern Deprivation (January 18, 2019)
No.	Title	Length
1.	"Immortal Disseverance"	3:06
2.	"Pillar of Rot"	2:39

Inherent Laceration (December 19, 2018)
No.	Title	Length
3.	"Inherent Laceration"	1:45
4.	"Entanglement"	2:08
5.	"Rites of Suffering"	2:35

Vomit Forth (May 4, 2018)
No.	Title	Length
6.	"Torn Open"	2:26
7.	"Formless One"	2:20
8.	"Unclaimed Cadaver"	1:49
9.	"Lethal Impulse"	3:02
Total length:		21:50

- Seething Malevolence (July 8, 2022)

No.	Title	Length
1.	"Intro"	1:21
2.	"Eucharist Intact"	2:13
3.	"Pain Tolerance"	2:22
4.	"Tortured Sacrament"	2:35
5.	"Unrecognizable"	3:55
6.	"Seething Malevolence"	3:14
7.	"Severely Wounded"	2:04
8.	"Carnivorous Incantation"	2:10
9.	"I Feel Nothing"	1:25
10.	"Predatory Savior"	3:01
11.	"Pious Killing Floor"	5:04
Total length:		29:24

- Terrified of God (October 11, 2024)

No.	Title	Length
1.	"Victim Impact Statement"	1:56
2.	"Sacred Apple"	1:50
3.	"Blood Soaked Death Dream"	2:47
4.	"Negative Penance"	2:19
5.	"Blood Lead Index"	2:30
6.	"Poison Child"	2:30
7.	"Fixation on the Narrative"	1:29
8.	"Non Responsive"	2:47
9.	"Terrified of God"	0:43
10.	"Fear of Retaliation"	3:10
11.	"Rotting Wool"	2:18
12.	"Salt"	2:49
Total length:		27:08
