= Tough guy hardcore =

Genre of hardcore punk

- Other names: New York-style hardcore
- Stylistic origins: Hardcore punk; thrash metal; hip hop; oi!
- Cultural origins: Mid–to late 1980s, New York City
- Derivative forms: Beatdown hardcore; brutal death metal; metalcore; slam death metal

Local scenes
- Boston; New York

Other topics
- Crossover thrash; groove metal; sludge metal; rapcore

Tough guy hardcore (also known as New York–style hardcore) is a subgenre of hardcore punk with prominent influences from thrash metal. It makes use of groove-driven, palm muted guitar riffs, breakdowns, lyrics discussing hatred, personal struggles, and unity, and a vocal style influenced by hip hop and oi!.

In the early to mid–1980s New York hardcore scene, bands including Agnostic Front and the Cro-Mags began cultivating a tough, street-wise and groove-driven take on hardcore punk which embraced elements of heavy metal music, particularly its palm muted guitar riffs. By the late 1980s, this developed into the first wave of tough guy hardcore bands: Breakdown, Killing Time, Judge and Sick of It All. During the 1990s, the genre continued with Madball and Biohazard being forefront bands in New York, while Blood for Blood, Strife, Hoods and NJ Bloodline expanded the sound across the United States. The genre received a revived interest in the 2000s through acts including No Warning, Death Before Dishonor and Terror, and into the 2010s and 2020s with Trapped Under Ice, Backtrack, Speed and Pain of Truth.

== Characteristics ==
"With these labels, it's almost like spreading the genre too far. Just because we talk about reality doesn't mean were trying to be 'tough'. We're just being truthful. This music was born on the streets. If you don't get it, then you don't get it. If it's not your thing, then it's not your thing."

— Freddy Cricien of Madball on the "tough guy" label.

Over time, many New York hardcore bands developed a unique style that was based more around rhythm and less around the influence of punk. The palm muting guitar technique was a key aspect of this sound, as well as gang vocals, heavy guitar riffs and heavy breakdowns. Punknews.org described tough guy as "heavy breakdowns, growly vocals" and "the occasional metal riff". The sound is particularly indebted to thrash metal.

Lyrics in the genre often discuss being macho, unity, vigilance and interpersonal relationships, particularly betrayal. According to writer Brian J. Kochan, the genre "embraces the mystique of the gritty and hard working class lives of those in America's big cities". NoEcho writer Chris Suffer defined the genre as "Lyrics fueled by hatred and personal struggles bred some of the most violent live shows in the world turning clubs... into battlegrounds for a few hours." One notable element of the genre is the use of shouted, "sing-along" choruses, an aspect originally influenced by English oi! bands.

Jake Tiernan of webzine Heavy Blog Is Heavy criticized tough guy hardcore for its perceived hypermasculinity, writing that it encourages a herd mentality and causes physical violence, which defies what punk, hardcore's roots, is about because punk is about individuality. Tiernan believed the genre hypermasculinity and socially mandatory mosh pits caused exclusion when the scene was initially intended to be about individuality and inclusion.

== History ==
=== Precursors ===
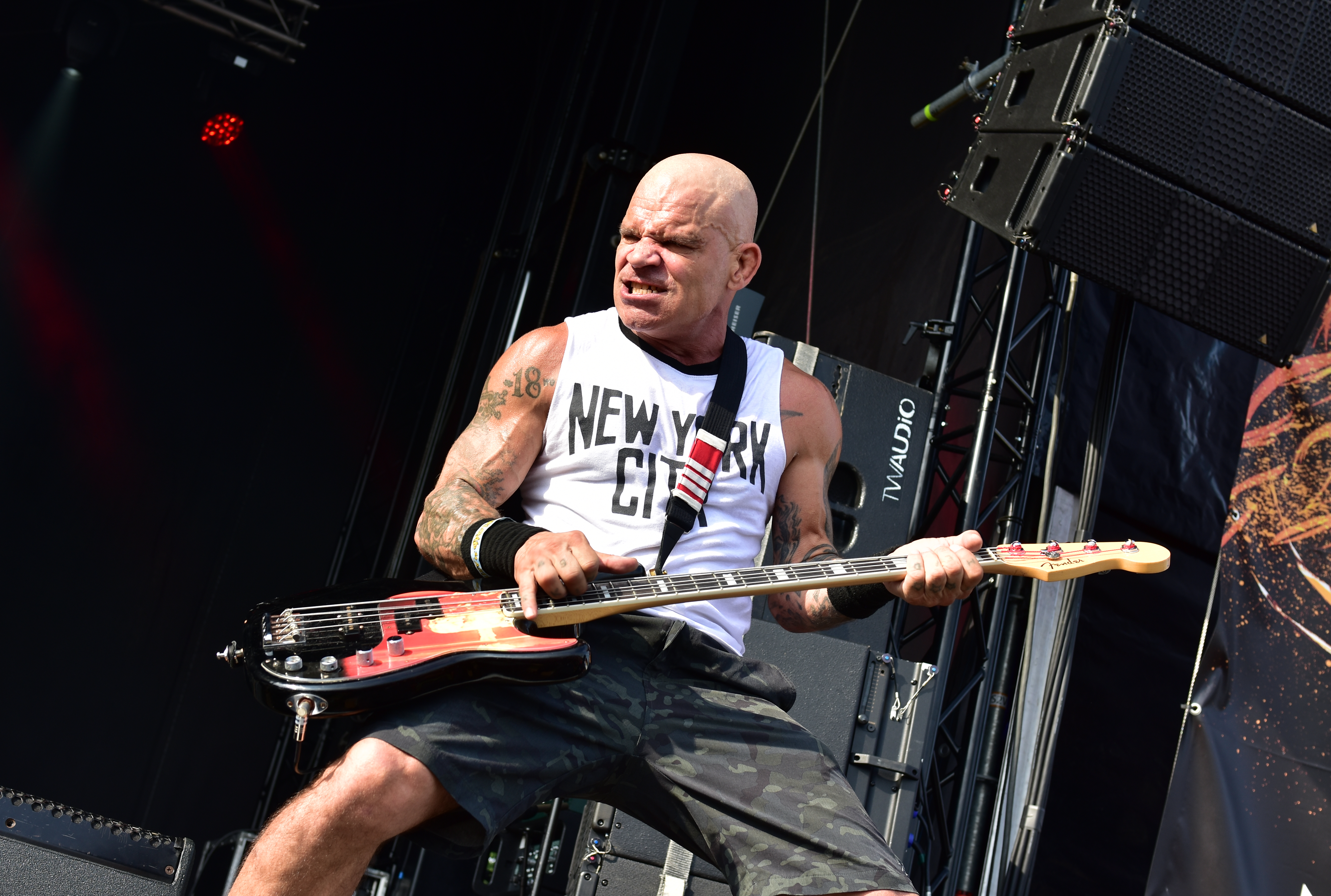
The Cro-Mags were an early New York hardcore band who emphasised their toughness, being influential on the development of tough guy hardcore.

During hardcore punk's early years, many participants in the Washington, D.C., hardcore, Boston hardcore and New York hardcore scenes developed a "tough guy ethos" through use of aggression, criminal violence and gang mentalites. By 1984, the Washington, D.C. and Boston scenes had largely began to distance themselves from this way of thinking, leaving New York bands Agnostic Front, the Cro-Mags, Murphy's Law and Warzone to continue it unchallenged. For some bands, particularly the Cro-Mags there was an active effort to search out musicians who bore this ethos. This was prominent enough within the band's sound that AllMusic writer Patrick Kennedy called their 1986 debut album the Age of Quarrel the "finest hour... [of] tough-guy hardcore". As the New York hardcore scene progressed many of these bands began to take significant influence from heavy metal and hip hop.

In 2020 interview with Revelation Records, Judge bassist Jimmy Yu discussed the early 1980s New York hardcore scene's relationship with hip hop and metal:

[T]here was a real gray area between straight edge kids, hardcore kids, punks, Hare Krishnas, and hip hop kids in NYC. It could all blur together, and it did. Especially hip-hop, it really came from the streets, and it had that element of violence. So, these boundaries were really blurred. It wasn’t like, “Ok, you are a rapper, and you are a straight edge kid, and you are a hardcore kid,” it wasn’t so strict and defined... Similarly, it was just like us listening to Metallica before the Kill 'Em All record came out. We saw their show, and they were throwing out their demo of the record before it came out... To us it was like hardcore just gone crazy. We had never thought about something like that in hardcore. It was like hardcore kids playing this music, except they had long hair and were more talented. That was great! And we just absorbed that too."

The Big Takeover noted Detroit band Negative Approach as "building a template for... tough guy hardcore", cited them as creating "the loudest, meanest, nastiest, harshest noise in existence then". Invisible Oranges cited the influence of Henry Rollins, of Black Flag, and his vocal style as influential on the genre.

=== Origins (late 1980s to mid–1990s) ===
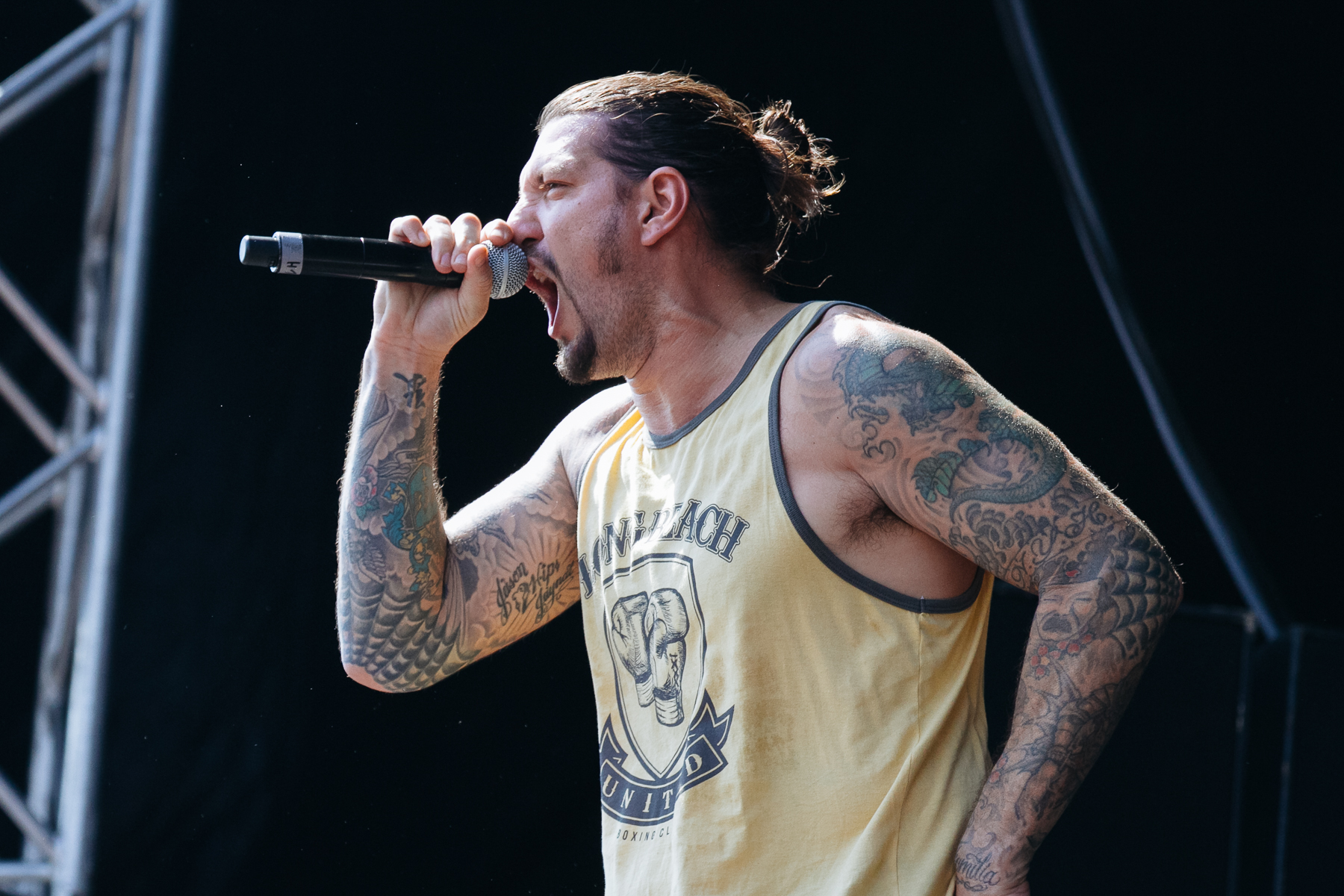
Madball, described by Stereogum as "an archetypal tough-guy hardcore band"

According to writer Tony Rettman, in his book NYHC (2015), Yonkers, New York band Breakdown, formed in 1987, were one of the first bands to define tough guy hardcore. The same year Judge released their debut EP New York Crew, which Crack magazine described as the record that took New York's "tough guy mentality to new heights". Other bands pushing this sound at the time included Sick of It All, Sheer Terror and Killing Time. One of the earliest bands to expand the sound's influence outside of New York was Inside Out from Orange County, California, formed in 1988.

Madball, formed in 1988, were credited by Riverfront Times as the band that defined tough guy hardcore, and by Stereogum as "an archetypal tough-guy hardcore band". During the 1990s, they became one of the most prominent bands in New York hardcore. with other New York bands continuing the sound including Pro-Pain, Merauder and No Redeeming Social Value. Biohazard's merger of hip hop and tough guy hardcore, in particular, was widely successful, with their 1992 single "Punishment" gaining significant airplay on MTV. The band's 1993 collaboration with rap group Onyx on the remix of "Slam" was certified platinum. Gradually, tough guy hardcore became so ubiquitous of the New York hardcore scene that the style became popularly known as "New York–style hardcore", or simply "New York hardcore".

=== Developments (mid–1990s to present) ===
During the 1990s, many bands from outside of New York began to play the style, including Blood for Blood, Strife, Hoods and NJ Bloodline. Of Blood for Blood, Lambgoat.com wrote "They've always sort of been the hardcore equivalent of N.W.A., keeping it 'realer' than anyone else and actually being tough guys who play so-called tough-guy hardcore". As the sound was expanded upon by groups from outside of New York, it ultimately became a more dominant sound in the hardcore scene than its original punk-based sound, becoming what is thought of "when you say 'hardcore'", and subsequently termed "new school hardcore".

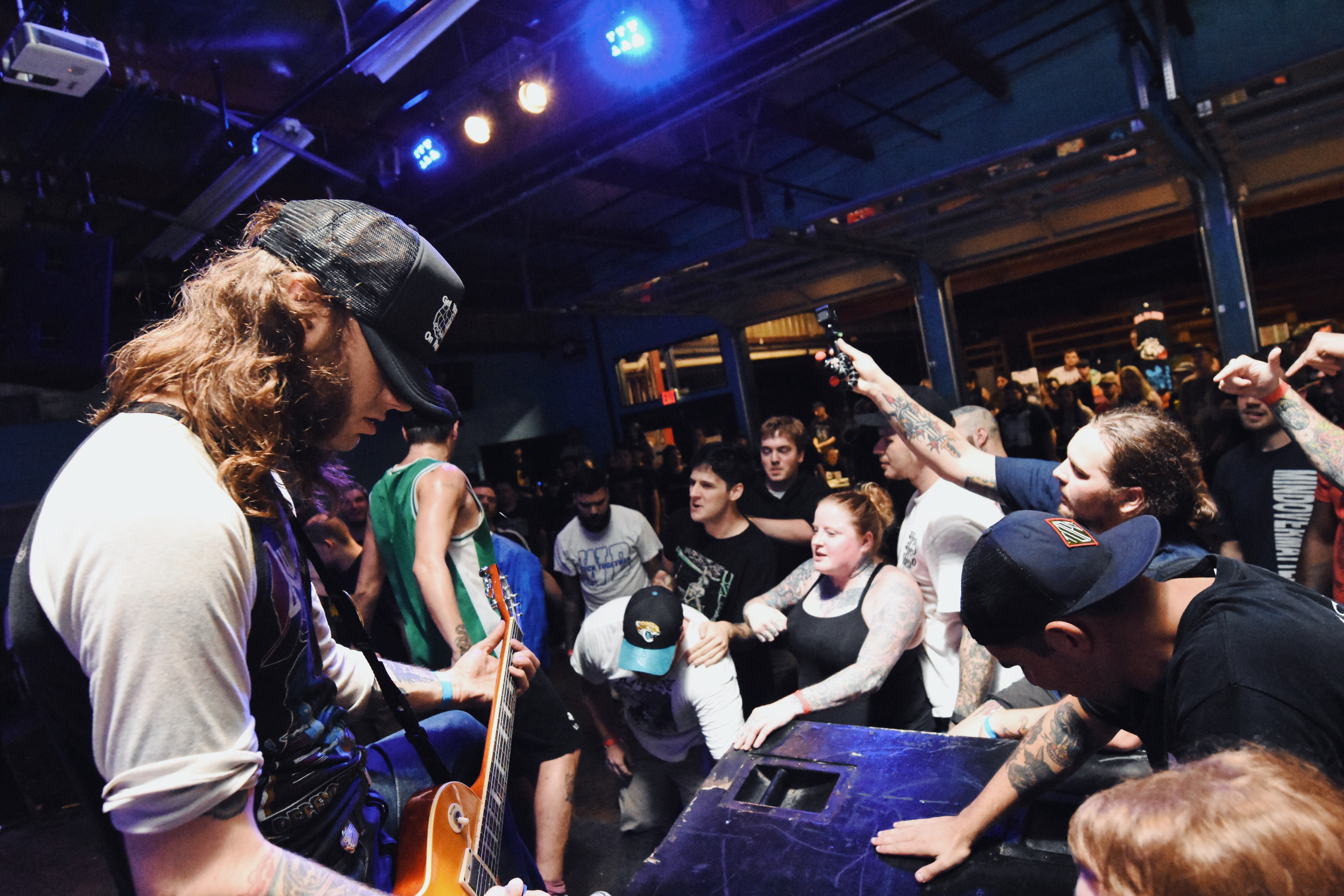
No Warning's debut album Ill Blood (2002) revived an interest in tough guy hardcore in the 2000s.

The 2000s saw the popularity of Death Before Dishonor, Terror, No Warning, Lionheart, Sworn Enemy and First Blood. Lambgoat.com called No Warning's debut album Ill Blood (2002) "Bridge 9's most prolific releases", stating that with its influence "the classic New York sound was brought to the masses in popular waves that had not been seen since Strife became the most convincing non-New York band to do it in the early 1990s...With the advent of No Warning’s popularity, the New York scene finally shed whatever underground status it had left as young fans scrambled to see who influenced them. And they discovered those bands. And then they formed their own bands." During this time, Agnostic Front, who had influenced the development of the style, changed their style to tough guy hardcore. Additionally, the sound's influence was seen in bands outside of the genre, including Emmure and the Ghost Inside, as well as playing a part in the pioneering of the deathcore genre,

In the 2010s, Trapped Under Ice, Incendiary and Backtrack became prominent players in the style. At the beginning of the decade, Trapped Under Ice were widely influential and emulated. The 2020s saw the popularity of Speed, Never Ending Game and Pain of Truth.

== Legacy ==
During the 1990s, the genre's influence went on to be embraced by groups outside of the genre such as Sepultura, Pantera and Throwdown. The genre's breakdowns influenced the sound of Long Island death metal band Suffocation, this aspect helped the band to pioneer the brutal death metal genre. The genre quickly developed a subgenre slam death metal, which put a greater emphasis on the elements of New York–style hardcore with notable groups including Internal Bleeding, Devourment and Cephalotripsy.

Tough guy hardcore influenced the development of metalcore, as well as beatdown hardcore, which was pioneered by Bulldoze, with their 1996 album The Final Beatdown giving the genre its name. Due to the prominence of alternative metal bands in the New York hardcore scene at the time, some tough guy hardcore bands began to incorporate melodic elements of that genre, namely Snapcase, Crown of Thornz and the Cro-Mags on Alpha Omega.

During the 2010s, some bands embraced the influence of the genre, but subverted its tough guy ethos by merging the sound with more upbeat and melodic elements, including Turnstile, High Vis and Higher Power.
