= No Warning =

No Warning may refer to:

- No Warning (band), a Canadian punk band
  - No Warning (album), the band's debut album
- No Warning, a 1991 album by British musician Dave Wakeling
- "No Warning", a song by King Crimson from Three of a Perfect Pair
- No Warning!, the second-season title of Panic (TV series)

== See also ==
- Without Warning (disambiguation)
