= Sanguisugabogg =

American death metal band

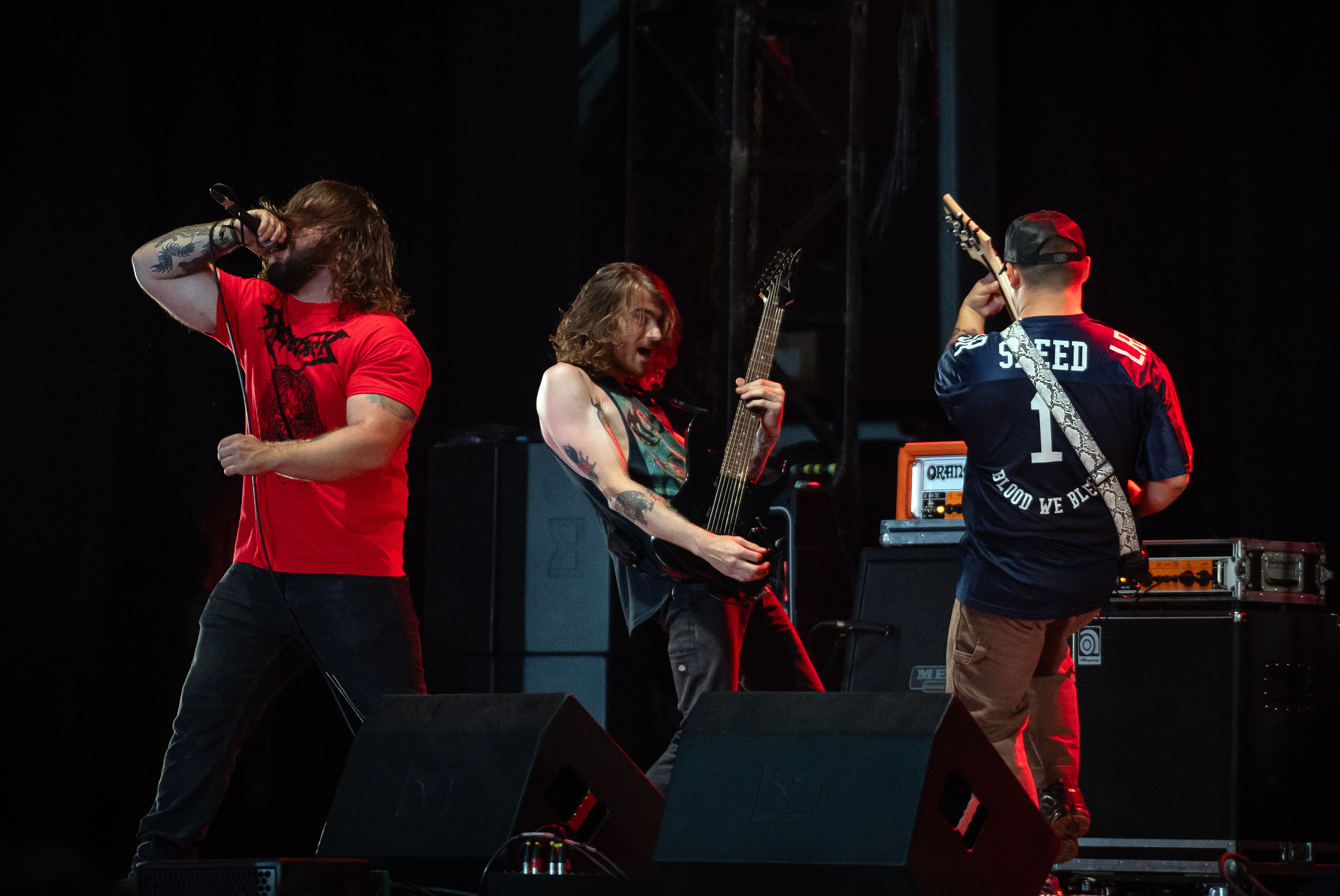
- Sanguisugabogg at Hellfest 2024

Background information
- Origin: Columbus, Ohio, U.S.
- Genre: slam metal
- Years active: 2019–present
- Labels: Maggot Stomp; Century Media
- Members: Cody Davidson; Devin Swank; Drew Arnold
- Past members: Cameron Boggs; Steph Barnes; Alex Cejas; Cedrik Davis
- Website: sanguisugabogg.com

Sanguisugabogg is an American slam metal band formed in Columbus, Ohio, in 2019 by guitarist Cameron Boggs. They have released one demo, one live album, and three studio albums. Current members include guitarist Cody Davidson, vocalist Devin Swank, and guitarist-bassist Drew Arnold.

The band's name is a reference to Boggs's last name and a combination of "sanguisuga" (Latin for "leech") and "bog" (British English slang for "toilet").

== History ==
=== 2019–2021: Formation and Tortured Whole ===
Sanguisugabogg formed in 2019 in Columbus, Ohio. On July 26, 2019, they released their debut EP/demo, Pornographic Seizures, through Maggot Stomp.

In early 2020, original bassist Steph Barnes left the group. That January, the band joined Creeping Death on a short U.S. tour, followed by a headlining run featuring Undeath, Vomit Forth, and Graveview on select dates.

On January 15, 2021, the band released the single "Menstrual Envy" and announced their debut full-length album, Tortured Whole, scheduled for release on March 26, 2021, via Century Media Records. Leading up to the album’s release, they issued additional singles, including "Dead as Shit" (February 5), "Dick Filet" (February 21) and "Gored in the Chest" (March 12). Following the release of Tortured Whole, Boggs left the band before the resumption of touring post-COVID-19 restrictions.

In late 2021, Sanguisugabogg co-headlined the "Frozen Whole" U.S. tour with Frozen Soul, supported by Vomit Forth and Inoculation.

=== 2022–2023: Homicidal Ecstasy ===
In May 2022, the band supported Terror on their Pain into Power U.S. release tour alongside Kublai Khan and Pain of Truth. The following month, they joined Cannibal Corpse and 200 Stab Wounds for a short U.S. run. During August 2022, they headlined another U.S. tour featuring Undeath, No/Más, Vomit Forth and Volcano. In November 2022, they toured Europe supporting Full of Hell alongside J.A.D.

On February 3, 2023, Sanguisugabogg released their sophomore album, Homicidal Ecstasy, through Century Media Records.

=== 2024–present: Hideous Aftermath and tours ===
On June 4, 2024, Sanguisugabogg released the standalone single "Permanently Fucked," their first new music since Homicidal Ecstasy.

In early 2024, the band supported Suffocation on a European tour alongside Enterprise Earth and Organectomy. Later that spring, they co-headlined a U.S. tour with Jesus Piece, featuring support from PeelingFlesh and GAG.

In November 2024, Sanguisugabogg's Instagram account was suspended without clear explanation. The band was frustrated over the platform's lack of communication and the impact on their fan engagement.

In January 2025, the band announced they were working on new music, slated for release later in the year. To promote their upcoming material, they headlined a spring tour with 200 Stab Wounds, Gridiron and Mutilatred. They were also set to perform at major festivals, including Louder Than Life 2025.

On June 27, 2025, the band released the single "Abhorrent Contraception", featuring Josh Welshman of Defeated Sanity. The band released its third studio album, Hideous Aftermath, on October 10, 2025.

== Musical style ==
Their debut album, Tortured Whole (2021), was noted for its raw and primitive approach, with critics highlighting its "caveman riffs" and "ignorantly heavy" sound. Angry Metal Guy described the album as "gross, tasteless, and a whole lot of fun," noting its blend of brutal death metal with a "swampy Obituary kick." Nattskog's Blog commented on the album's "primal, stomping slab of filthy Death Metal," emphasizing its "brutish, crude and heavy" nature.

With their follow-up album, Homicidal Ecstasy (2023), the band refined their approach, incorporating slightly more technicality while retaining their signature primal and sludgy aesthetic. Metal Injection noted that the album "effectively elevates music made by a band whose name roughly translates to 'blood sucking toilet,' while maintaining the tenets that make their music so much fun." Teeth of the Divine highlighted the album's "punch-you-in-the-face style" production, comparing it to the likes of Internal Bleeding, Dehumanized and Cannibal Corpse. Sputnikmusic praised the album's "hardcore energy," suggesting it elevates the band's presence within the genre. Metal Purgatory Media noted that tracks like "Pissed" and "Necrosexual Deviant" showcase the band's traditional sound while incorporating more groove and structured tones reminiscent of early Cannibal Corpse.

The band's sound is also distinguished by its tongue-in-cheek approach to death metal tropes, often exaggerating gore and violence to the point of parody, as noted in Pitchfork’s review of their early work.

== Members ==
=== Current ===
- Devin Swank – vocals (2019–present)
- Cody Davidson – drums (2019–present), guitar (2026–present)
- Drew Arnold – guitar, bass (2021–present)

=== Touring ===
- Eric Morotti – drums (2026–present)

=== Former ===
- Cameron Boggs – guitar (2019–2021)
- Steph Barnes – bass (2019–2020)
- Alex Cejas – bass (2024)
- Cedrik Davis – guitar, bass (2020–2026)

== Discography ==
=== Studio albums ===
- Tortured Whole (2021)
- Homicidal Ecstasy (2023)
- Hideous Aftermath (2025)

=== Live albums ===
- The Devil's Eyes (2022)

=== Demos ===
- Pornographic Seizures (2019)

== Controversies ==
=== "Free Luigi" shirt controversy (December 2024) ===
In December 2024, the band released a limited-edition "Free Luigi" shirt featuring a parody of the Super Mario Bros. character Luigi, referencing the arrest of Luigi Mangione in connection with the murder of UnitedHealthcare CEO Brian Thompson. The shirt depicted Luigi in a hoodie, holding a gun over Bowser, with the caption "Free Luigi." This design drew criticism for its insensitivity and potential legal issues, particularly concerning the use of Nintendo's intellectual property. Vocalist Devin Swank clarified that the shirt was a personal project and not official band merch.
