= Conceived in Sewage =

Studio album by Devourment
- Released: February 19, 2013
- Recorded: Mana Recording Studio in St. Petersburg, Florida
- Genre: Death metal
- Length: 33:26
- Label: Relapse
- Producer: Erik Rutan

Devourment chronology
| Unleash the Carnivore (2009) | Conceived in Sewage (2013) | Obscene Majesty (2019) |

Conceived in Sewage is the fourth studio album by American death metal band Devourment. It was released by Relapse Records on February 19, 2013. A music video was released for "Parasitic Eruption".

== Musical style ==
The album features a sound that differs from the band's notorious style of focusing on an abundance of slams. The slam riffs are notably kept to a minimum while a sound more reminiscent of traditional death metal is performed on the album.

This new sound gathered a mixed reception from fans and reviewers.

== Reception ==
Professional ratings
Review scores
| Source | Rating |
|---|---|
| Exclaim! | 8/10 |
| PopMatters | 7/10 stars |
| Revolver | 2.5/5 |

Conceived in Sewage received mixed to positive reviews. Denise Falzon of Exclaim! described the album as "33 minutes of slamming, brutal death metal mixed with grind elements", and called it "fast and punishing throughout". Dean Brown of PopMatters said, "for the most part Conceived in Sewage has...concise, memorable songwriting". Brown also liked "Majewski's...rhythmic gutturals", but noted that "Devourment are not pushing into any uncharted death metal terrains with Conceived in Sewage". Chris Krovatin of Revolver said that the band "[does] entirely what you expect them to". He also noted, "While spirited in their performance, this brutal quartet lack the dynamism and versatility of label-mates Dying Fetus, resulting in a relatively entertaining record for death metal fans but not much more."

Both Falzon and Krovatin praised Erik Rutan's production, with Falzon saying that it "takes Conceived in Sewage to a higher level of eviscerating brutality", and Krovatin calling the sound "solid" and "lush".

== Release history ==
Conceived in Sewage was released in North America on February 19, 2013, on February 22 in certain European countries, and on February 25 in the UK and the rest of the world.

== Track listing ==
| No. | Title | Length |
|---|---|---|
| 1. | "Legalize Homicide" | 4:11 |
| 2. | "Fifty Ton War Machine" | 4:16 |
| 3. | "Conceived in Sewage" | 4:10 |
| 4. | "Fucked with Rats" | 4:12 |
| 5. | "March to Megiddo" | 1:19 |
| 6. | "Today We Die, Tomorrow We Kill" | 4:15 |
| 7. | "Heaving Acid" | 3:10 |
| 8. | "Carved into Ecstasy" | 4:16 |
| 9. | "Parasitic Eruption" | 3:37 |
| 10. | "The Pick-Axe Murders" (Cannibal Corpse cover; digital bonus track) | 3:13 |
| Total length: | | 33:26 |

== Personnel ==
Devourment

- Mike Majewski – vocals
- Ruben Rosas – guitars
- Chris Andrews – bass
- Eric Park – drums

Additional personnel

- Travis Ryan – vocals ("Fucked with Rats")

Production

- Erik Rutan – producer
