= Hideous Aftermath =

Studio album by Sanguisugabogg
- Released: October 10, 2025
- Studio: God City
- Genre: Slam metal
- Length: 47:27
- Label: Century Media
- Producer: Kurt Ballou

Sanguisugabogg chronology
Homicidal Ecstasy (2023)	Hideous Aftermath (2025)

Singles from Hideous Aftermath
- 1. "Abhorrent Contraception" Released: June 27, 2025

Hideous Aftermath is the third studio album by American Slam metal band Sanguisugabogg. It was released on October 10, 2025, via Century Media Records in LP, CD and digital formats.

== Background ==
The album was recorded and produced by Converge guitarist Kurt Ballou in his Salem, Massachusetts studio. "Abhorrent Contraception" was released as the lead single on June 27, 2025. Lead vocalist Devin Swank noted the song as "a timeless classic with a theme very tried and true with our genre and it's about the slaughter of an entire family and the unborn."

== Reception ==
Professional ratings
Review scores
Source	Rating
Blabbermouth	9/10
Kerrang	3/5
New Noise	4/5 stars
Sputnikmusic	2.8/5

Rating the album 2.8 out of five, Ryan P of Sputnikmusic remarked, "There are glimmers of greatness here and there, but there's a bit too much generic death metal this time around."

Kerrang!'s James Hingle described the album as the band's "most putrid, powerful and perversely listenable," giving it a verdict score of three. The album received a 9/10 rating from Blabbermouth's Dom Lawson referred to the release as "a deep and deeply rewarding listen, with just enough puke-inducing obnoxiousness to keep everything on the right (i.e. wrong) side of sensible."

In a four-star review for New Noise, Randy Radic remarked, "At times slow-mo and black, at other times thrumming with vile waves of filth, Hideous Aftermath sees Sanguisugabogg leveling up." Writing for Metal.de, Oliver Schreyer opined, "Purely musically, the album is the most mature that the band has achieved so far in terms of its brutality, intensity and artistic implementation."

== Track listing ==
All tracks are written by Sanguisugabogg.

Hideous Aftermath track listing
No.	Title	Length
1.	"Rotted Entanglement"	5:37
2.	"Felony Abuse of a Corpse" (featuring PeelingFlesh)	5:23
3.	"Ritual of Autophagia" (featuring Todd Jones)	4:48
4.	"Heinous Testimony"	3:20
5.	"Abhorrent Contraception" (featuring Defeated Sanity)	5:30
6.	"Repulsive Demise"	4:02
7.	"Erotic Beheading"	2:52
8.	"Sanctified Defilement"	3:32
9.	"Semi Automatic Facial Reconstruction" (featuring Travis Ryan and Cattle Decapitation)	4:33
10.	"Paid in Flesh" (featuring Dylan Walker and Full of Hell)	7:50
Total length:		47:27

== Personnel ==
Credits adapted from the album's liner notes.

=== Sanguisugabogg ===
- Devin Swank – vocals
- Cody Davison – drums, bass, programming
- Drew Arnold – guitars, bass, programming
- Cedrik Davis – guitars

=== Additional contributors ===
- Kurt Ballou – production, recording, mixing
- Zach Weeks – recording
- Mike Balajian – mastering
- Jaden Stutts – band photo
- Kyle Allon Bond – artwork, layout

== Charts ==
Chart performance for Hideous Aftermath
Chart (2025)	Peak position
French Physical Albums (SNEP)	177
French Rock & Metal Albums (SNEP)	61
US Top Current Album Sales (Billboard)	49
