= 1.3.8. =

Compilation album by Devourment
- Released: 2000
- Genre: Slam death metal
- Length: 49:52
- Label: Corpse Gristle, Displeased, Unmatched Brutality, Night of the Vinyl Dead

Devourment chronology
Molesting the Decapitated (1999)	1.3.8. (2000)	Butcher the Weak (2005)

1.3.8. is a compilation album by American death metal band Devourment, released in 2000 by Corpse Gristle. The album was reissued in 2004 by Displeased Records and Unmatched Brutality Records with an upgraded layout and new artwork. 1.3.8 was also released as a limited edition record by the label Night of the Vinyl Dead. It includes one new song called "Babykiller" (1), all three tracks from the Impaled demo (3), and all eight tracks from Molesting the Decapitated (8).

== Track listing ==
1. "Babykiller" – 4:29
2. "Shroud of Encryption" (demo) – 2:58
3. "Festering Vomitous Mass" (demo) – 2:35
4. "Choking on Bile" (demo) – 4:16
5. "Festering Vomitous Mass" – 2:51
6. "Postmortal Coprophagia" – 6:15
7. "Choking on Bile" – 4:17
8. "Molesting the Decapitated" – 4:42
9. "Self Disembowelment" – 4:34
10. "Fucked to Death" – 5:28
11. "Devour the Damned" – 4:22
12. "Shroud of Encryption" – 2:57

== Personnel ==
- Wayne Knupp – vocals (tracks 1–4)
- Ruben Rosas – vocals (5–12)
- Brian "Brain" Wynn – guitars
- Kevin Clark – guitars
- Mike Majewski – bass
- Brad Fincher – drums
- D. Braxton Henry – guitar (1), backing vocals (4)
