= Unleash the Carnivore =

Studio album by Devourment
- Released: June 26, 2009
- Recorded: 379 Productions in Dallas, Texas
- Genre: Slam death metal
- Length: 34:26
- Label: Brutal Bands
- Producer: D. Braxton Henry

Devourment chronology
Butcher the Weak (2005)	Unleash the Carnivore (2009)	Conceived in Sewage (2013)

Professional ratings
Review scores
Source	Rating
Blabbermouth.net	7.5/10
Teufel's Tomb	favorable

Unleash the Carnivore is the third studio album by American death metal band Devourment. It was released through Brutal Bands on June 26, 2009.

== Track listing ==
No.	Title	Length
1.	"Unleash the Carnivore"	3:37
2.	"Abomination Unseen"	4:53
3.	"Fed to the Pigs"	4:00
4.	"Incitement to Mass Murder"	3:40
5.	"Crucify the Impure"	4:35
6.	"Deflesh the Abducted"	4:49
7.	"Over Her Dead Body"	3:04
8.	"Field of the Impaled"	5:48

== Personnel ==
Devourment

- Mike Majewski – vocals
- Ruben Rosas – guitars
- Chris Andrews – bass
- Eric Park – drums

Production

- D. Braxton Henry – producer
- Pär Olofsson – artwork
- Dan Seagrave – artwork (serpent)
