= Pain of Truth =

American hardcore band

- Origin: Long Island, New York, U.S.
- Genres: Tough guy hardcore; beatdown hardcore; metalcore
- Years active: 2020–present
- Label: Daze
- Spinoff of: Hangman
- Members: Michael Smith; Ridge Rhine; Nik Hansen; Zach Stachura; Nick Barker
- Past members: Chris Rini

Pain of Truth are an American hardcore punk band formed on Long Island, New York in 2020. As of 2024, they have released one demo, two split EPs, and two studio albums.

Following the disbandment of his previous band Hangman, Michael Smith began to write and record songs during the COVID-19 lockdowns. These tracks were eventually released as the No Blame… Just Facts demo in July 2020, by which time he had enlisted a band lineup of himself on vocals, Chris Rini on drums, Nik Hansen and Ridge Rhine on guitars and Zach Stachura on bass. The group made a name for themselves through their extensive use of guest features, which have included notable hardcore musicians such as Freddy Cricien, Scott Vogel and Justice Tripp. Their debut album Not Through Blood was released on September 8, 2023.

== History ==
Michael Smith was inspired to become involved in hardcore punk after seeing his older brothers Chris and Danny's band Backtrack's debut live show. Following this, he formed the band Stand Your Ground, in which he played guitar, in the following years he became the vocalist in Numbskull then the guitarist in Hangman. Hangman's debut album One By One was released in 2019, however within a few months the COVID-19 lockdowns and the band disbanded. During the lockdown, Smith began to record instrumental demos. After sending these recordings to his friend Andrew "Lumpy" Wojcik, owner of Daze Records, Wojcik encouraged Smith to record vocals. Inspired by hip hop music's use of vocal features, all but one of the five demoed tracks included a feature from another hardcore band: King Nine, Billy Club Sandwich, Forced Out, Simulakra, Life's Question and Scarab. Part of the way through the recording, Smith enlisted Chris Rini to play drums and Nik Hansen to play guitar, who assisted in completing the recording process. These demos were eventually released by Daze Records in July 2020, titled No Blame… Just Facts.

On March 16, 2021, the band released a split EP with Hudson Valley hardcore Age Of Apocalypse. In March 2022, they toured the United States supporting Drain along Ingrown. On April 29, they supported Gulch on the first night of their final two East Coast shows at Saint Vitus in New York, alongside King Nine and All Due Respect. In May, they toured the United States supporting Terror, alongside Kublai Khan and Sanguisugabogg. On September 23 and 24, they played the Black and Blue Bowl showcase, organised by Triple B, Streets of Hate, and Daze Records, alongside Sunami. Between June 23 and 9 July, they toured as a part of the Triple B Records European Takeover, headlined by Sunami and No Pressure.

Pain of Truth headlined the Friday of the 2023 Black and Blue Bowl on 12 May, with support from Bulldoze, Merauder and All Out War. On June 20, they released the single "Actin' Up" featuring 200 Stab Wounds vocalist Steve Buhl, announcing that it would be a part of their debut album Not Through Blood. The album's second single "Under My Skin" was released July 18 featuring Criminal Instinct vocalist Josiah Hoeflinger. On August 5, they played This is Hardcore festival 2023. On August 16, they released the single "You and Me" featuring Freddy Cricien, vocalist of Madball. During this time, Rini departed from the group and Nick Barker was brought in to fill his role. On August 27, they supported Life of Agony and Sick of It All at the Chance in Poughkeepsie alongside Outburst and Regulate. On September 8, they released their debut album Not Through Blood. On September 30, the band were scheduled to perform at Code's World festival organised and headlined by Code Orange, however they dropped out on the day due to illness. Between November 2 and December 15, the band toured the United States on their debut headline tour, with support from Life's Question, Vomit Forth and Momentum.

Between February 2 and 13 2024, the band toured the United Kingdom, supporting Malevolence alongside Rough Justice. Between May 11 and 26, they supported Kublai Khan on their United States headline tour alongside Harm's Way and Justice For The Damned. Between June 25 and July 7, they supported A Day To Remember on their United States headline tour. From August 22 to 30, they toured Australia supporting Speed alongside High Vis and Fuse. Between October 7 and 31, they will tour the United States on a co-headline tour with Dying Wish.

On September 25, 2026, the band’s second studio album Pain of Truth was released via DAZE records. Throughout October and November 2026, the band embarked on a North American tour in support of the album with bands such as Madball, Killing Time, 100 Demons, Rotting Out, and Missing Link serving as supporting acts.

== Musical style ==
Critics have categorized Pain of Truth's music as tough guy hardcore, beatdown hardcore and metalcore. Their music is indebted to heavy 1990s hardcore bands who put an emphasis on groove and the influence of hip hop like Dog Eat Dog and Biohazard. Revolver writer Eli Enis described their sound as "if Hatebreed came up on Trapped Under Ice instead of Madball". Noizze writer Jude Bennett described their sound as "Taking the best of Hatebreed and other classic hardcore bands and mixing it with metal and a dash of hip-hop."

== Members ==
Current

- Michael Smith – vocals (2020–present)
- Ridge Rhine – lead guitar (2020–present)
- Nik Hansen – rhythm guitar (2020–present)
- Zach Stachura – bass (2020–present)
- Nick Barker – drums (2023–present)

Former

- Chris Rini – drums (2020–2023)

== Discography ==
Albums

- Not Through Blood (2023)
- Pain of Truth (2026)

EPs

- Pain of Truth / Age of Apocalypse (2021, split EP with Age of Apocalypse)
- Coast to Coast (2025, split EP with Sunami)

Demos

- No Blame… Just Facts (2020)
