= Ill Blood =

Album by No Warning

Studio album by No Warning
- Released: November 26, 2002
- Recorded: 2002
- Genre: Tough guy hardcore
- Length: 24:21
- Label: Bridge 9
- Producers: Ben Cook, Dean Baltulonis

No Warning chronology
No Warning (2001)	Ill Blood (2002)	Suffer, Survive (2004)

Professional ratings
Review scores
Source	Rating
AllMusic	3/5 stars
Punknews.org	3.5/5 stars

Ill Blood is the second studio album by Canadian hardcore band No Warning. It was released on November 26, 2002, on Bridge 9 Records.

It is the band's last album on the indie hardcore label Bridge 9. This album was produced by Ben Cook and Dean Baltulonis.

== Critical reception ==
AllMusic wrote that "No Warning's sound is far from melodic -- singer Ben Cook is a vitriolic, atonal screamer in the grand tradition -- but it's more complex and nuanced than that of many of the group's contemporaries."

== Track listing ==
1. "Behind These Walls" - 2:36
2. "No Time for You" - 2:48
3. "Answer the Call" - 1:20
4. "Short Fuse" (ft. Mark Porter) - 3:08
5. "Wound Up" - 1:36
6. "Growing Silent - 2:01
7. "Caught in the Web" - 2:28
8. "All New Low" - 2:25
9. "Over My Shoulder" - 0:56
10. "Leech" - 2:12
11. "Pushing On" - 1:47
12. "Ill Blood" - 3:04

== Personnel ==
- Ben Cook - vocals
- Matt Delong - guitar
- Jordan Posner - guitar
- Ryan Gavel - bass
- Dj Jacobs - drums

=== Additional personnel ===
- Mark Porter - vocals
- Matt Henderson - guitar
- Dean Baltalonis - guitar
