= Not Through Blood =

Studio album by Pain of Truth
- Released: September 9, 2023
- Studios: Bricktop Recording, Chicago, Illinois, United States
- Genres: Beatdown hardcore; metalcore
- Length: 26:49
- Language: English
- Label: DAZE

Pain of Truth chronology
Live at TIHC 22' (2022)	Not Through Blood (2023)

Not Through Blood is the debut full-length studio album by American New York hardcore band Pain of Truth.

== Reception ==
Online retailer Bandcamp recognized this album as one of seven essential releases for the week, with critic Zoe Camp calling it "a priceless opportunity" to see legends of the New York hardcore scene on an album with a new artist. Andrew Sacher of BrooklynVegan chose this as one of the top ten hardcore albums of mid-2023, writing that the band's performance is strong and buoyed by all of the guest stars. Editors of Stereogum named this Album of the Week, with critic Tom Breihan writing that this album pushes hardcore orthodoxy for serving up "nothing but well-worn hardcore tropes", with "riffs [that] have a real snap to them, a bounce so brittle and unbending that it's almost funky on its own terms".

Eli Enis of Revolver chose "Actin' Up" as one of the six best songs of the week on June 23, 2023 and also spotlighted "Under My Skin". "Actin' Up" was also praised by Stereogum in that publication's monthly review of punk music.

This was rated the second best hardcore album of 2023 by Stereogum. Editors at Revolver ranked this the fourth best hardcore album of 2023.

== Track listing ==
1. "Lifeless in the Ground" – 2:25
2. "In Your Heart" – 1:30
3. "Actin' Up" – 2:23
4. "You and Me" – 2:28
5. "This Falls On You" – 2:09
6. "Too Late" – 3:09
7. "Pickin' at Scraps" – 2:28
8. "Out of Our Hands" – 2:46
9. "Same Old Story" – 1:33
10. "Under My Skin" – 2:52
11. "Not Through Blood" – 3:06

== Personnel ==
Pain of Truth

- Michael Brian Smith – vocals
- Ridge Rhine – lead guitar
- Nik Hansen – rhythm guitar
- Zach Stachura – bass
- Chris Rini – drums

Additional personnel

- Steve Buhl – guest on "Actin' Up"
- Vinnie Caruana – guest on "Out of Our Hands"
- Freddy Cricien – guest on "You and Me"
- Anthony DiDio – guest on "Lifeless on the Ground"
- Brendan Garrone – guest on "Not Through Blood"
- Corin Gillespie – guest on "Not Through Blood"
- Bill Henderson – mastering
- Josiah Hoeflinger – guest on "Under My Skin"
- Jonathan Lhaubouet – guest on "Lifeless on the Ground"
- Shane Moran – guest on "This Falls On You"
- Andy Nelson – recording, mixing
- Jason Petagine – guest on "Pickin' at Scraps"
- Austin Sparkman – guest on "Pickin' at Scraps"
- Justice Tripp – guest on "Too Late"
- Scott Vogel – guest on "In Your Heart"

== See also ==
- 2023 in American music
- List of 2023 albums
