= Suffer, Survive =

Studio album by No Warning
- Released: October 19, 2004
- Recorded: 2004
- Studio: Metalworks Studios (Mississauga, Ontario)
- Genres: Melodic hardcore, nu metal
- Length: 29:38
- Label: Machine Shop
- Producers: Greig Nori, Matt Hyde

No Warning chronology
Ill Blood (2002)	Suffer, Survive (2004)	Resurrection of the Wolf (2013)

Professional ratings
Review scores
Source	Rating
AllMusic	3.5/5 stars

Suffer, Survive is the third album from Canadian hardcore punk band No Warning. The album is the band's debut release on the Machine Shop label, and features a melodic hardcore and nu metal sound.

The album was produced by then Sum 41 manager/producer Greig Nori.

Music videos were made for the singles "Bad Timing" and "Back to Life". The song "Breeding Insanity" was featured in the 2005 video game Need For Speed: Underground Rivals and NFL Street 2, and "Bad Timing" was included in the 2006 video game Crusty Demons.

== Track listing ==
1. "Dirtier Than the Next" - 1:57
2. "Bad Timing" - 3:05
3. "Modern Eyes" - 1:44
4. "Scratch the Skin" - 3:22
5. "Hopeless Case" - 2:32
6. "Back to Life" - 2:46
7. "No Don't Think So" - 3:11
8. "Breeding Insanity" - 3:11
9. "Live Through Me" (Bonus track) - 2:57
10. "S304" (Bonus track) - 6:13

== Personnel ==
- Ben Cook - vocals
- Matt Delong - guitar
- Jordan Posner - guitar
- Zach Amster - bass
- Jesse Labovitz - drums
