= Age of Apocalypse (band) =

American hardcore band

- Origin: Hudson Valley, New York, U.S.
- Genres: Hardcore, metallic hardcore
- Years active: 2018–present
- Label: Closed Casket Activities

Age of Apocalypse is an American hardcore band from the Hudson Valley region of New York. The band was formed in 2018 and consists of vocalist Dylan Kaplowitz, guitarist Jack Xiques, guitarist Terry Orlando, bassist Joe Shannon, and drummer Will Kamerman.

Age of Apocalypse gained attention within the hardcore scene following the release of their debut EP The Way in 2020. Stereogum subsequently featured the band in its 2022 list The 40 Best New Bands of 2022.

The band's debut studio album, Grim Wisdom, was released in 2022, followed by In Oblivion in 2025.

== History ==
=== Formation and early releases ===
Age of Apocalypse was formed in 2018 in the Hudson Valley region of New York. Stereogum described the band as part of the Hudson Valley hardcore scene and noted their connection to the scene surrounding bands such as Mindforce.

The band's debut EP, The Way, was released in 2020. In July of that year, CVLT Nation premiered the record in full and described Age of Apocalypse as a New York melodic metallic hardcore band.

In 2021, the band released a split 7-inch with Pain of Truth. Stereogum covered the band that year in connection with the release of the song "The Patriot", describing Age of Apocalypse as a band from the Hudson Valley hardcore scene and noting the attention they had received before being able to play live shows.

=== Grim Wisdom ===
Age of Apocalypse released their debut studio album, Grim Wisdom, in 2022.

No Echo reviewed the album and described its sound as combining hardcore with metal-oriented guitar work, slow breakdowns and melodic vocals. The review singled out vocalist Dylan Kaplowitz's vocal performance as one of the band's distinguishing characteristics and compared parts of his singing to Mina Caputo of Life of Agony.

Grim Wisdom was also reviewed by Teeth of the Divine. The publication described Age of Apocalypse as a Hudson Valley metallic hardcore band and highlighted the band's combination of metal, hardcore and grunge-influenced elements.

In October 2022, Stereogum included Age of Apocalypse in its annual list The 40 Best New Bands of 2022. The publication described the band as a hardcore group from the Hudson Valley and highlighted Kaplowitz's vocals and the band's heavy guitar riffs.

=== In Oblivion ===
Age of Apocalypse released their second studio album, In Oblivion, on May 23, 2025, through Closed Casket Activities.

New Noise Magazine described the album as a development of the band's earlier material and highlighted its combination of heavy metal instrumentation and Kaplowitz's clean vocals. The album features guest appearances by Colin Young of Twitching Tongues, Shaun Alexander of Demonstration of Power and Graham Sayle of High Vis.

In an interview published by New Noise Magazine in May 2025, guitarist Jack Xiques and vocalist Dylan Kaplowitz discussed the writing and recording of In Oblivion, including the development of the band's sound and their approach to songwriting.

No Echo also interviewed Kaplowitz ahead of the album's release. The interview discussed the development of his vocal style and the band's progression from Grim Wisdom to In Oblivion.

In 2025, In Oblivion was included in New Noise Magazine's year-end list of the magazine's top albums of the year.

== Musical style ==
Age of Apocalypse have been described as a metallic hardcore band.

Stereogum described the band as a hardcore group whose sound combines large guitar riffs with Dylan Kaplowitz's distinctive vocal delivery, which the publication contrasted with more conventional hardcore vocals.

Reviews of Grim Wisdom have noted the band's use of metal-influenced riffs, breakdowns and melodic vocals.

Kaplowitz's vocal style has been a recurring focus of coverage of the band. No Echo described his singing as a combination of a heavy-metal influence and the harsher vocal approach associated with hardcore.

== Discography ==
=== Studio albums ===
- Grim Wisdom (2022)
- In Oblivion (2025)

=== Extended plays ===
- The Way (2020)

=== Split releases ===
- Pain of Truth / Age of Apocalypse (2021, with Pain of Truth)
