= Cephalotripsy (band) =

American death metal band

- Origin: San Diego, California, U.S.
- Genre: Slam death metal
- Years active: 2003–present
- Label: Amputated Vein
- Members: Angel Ochoa; Andres Guzman; Diego Sanchez; Albert Rios
- Website: Facebook

Cephalotripsy is an American slam death metal band from California. The group formed in 2003 and have released two albums, three demos and promos and have been included on a split with Membro Genitali Befurcator. The band is characterized by their very slow death metal style, which focuses primarily on playing slam riffs.

The band's name refers to the method of removing a stillborn fetus from the womb by crushing its head. A medical tool known as a cephalotribe is used to do this. As explained by Webster's Dictionary; a cephalotripsy is "The act or operation of crushing the head of a fetus in the womb in order to effect delivery."

== History ==
Cephalotripsy originally began with the members in high school, playing basement shows and house parties. The band wasn't taken seriously until at least 2006, when they released a three-song demo. Following their demo, the band wrote and recorded their full-length album entitled Uterovaginal Insertion of Extirpated Anomalies (2007), it was released through Amputated Vein Records and was met with mixed reviews. Some favored the band's style of playing slam riffs almost exclusively while others panned the release for being "too boring." Despite this, Amputated Vein re-released the album the next year.

In 2008, the band played the New England Deathfest alongside bands including Dying Fetus and Circle of Dead Children.

2011 saw Cephalotripsy release their Promo 2011 CD, displaying a new musical style of which abandoned their previous "slam only" style. This was met (again) with mixed reception, having some fans not favor the release while others praised their new direction. The following year, the band was included on a split entitled Membro Cephalic Symbiosis with the Russian band Membro Genitali Befurcator.

As of 2014, Cephalotripsy have announced that they are due to release their second full-length album entitled Induced Primordial Regression. They have stated that plans to begin recording start in either July or August.

In 2017, after years of inactivity, the band was included on the ninth annual Las Vegas Death Fest, their first performance since 2012. Cephalotripsy shortly thereafter followed-up this show with a US tour with the brutal death metal bands Splattered and Incinerate.

The band released their second album, Epigenetic Neurogenesis, on July 13, 2024, marking their first album in 17 years.

== Members ==
=== Current ===
- Angel Ochoa – vocals (2006–present)
- Andres Guzman – guitars (2008–present)
- Diego Sanchez – bass (2017–present)
- Albert Rios – drums (2021–present)

=== Former ===
- Nick Ochs – guitars (2003–2007)
- Kyle Heart – drums (2005–2006)
- Forrest Stedt – drums (2006–2021)
- Kenny Huffman – guitars (2006)
- Rah Davis – bass (2006)
- Wes "Hux" Kell – guitars (2007–2008)
- Carlos "Zinky" Hernandez – bass (2007)
- Shawn Whitaker – bass (2008)
- Mark Candelas – bass (2011–2012)

== Discography ==
Albums

- Uterovaginal Insertion of Extirpated Anomalies (2007)
- Epigenetic Neurogenesis (2024)

Demos/promos

- Demo 2006
- Promo 2007
- Promo 2011
