= Extermination Dismemberment =

Belarusian band

- Origin: Minsk, Belarus
- Genres: Slam death metal; symphonic metal
- Years active: 2009–present
- Labels: Imbecil, Amputated Vein, Unique Leader
- Members: Arseny Kovalchuk; Viktor Kanashevich; Vladislav Martirosov; Alexander Kazakov
- Past members: Valery Kozhemyako; Denis Poluyan
- Website: exterminationdismemberment.com

Extermination Dismemberment is a Belarusian slam death metal band from Minsk formed in 2009. They have released three studio albums and a re-recording of their debut, Butcher Basement.

Extermination Dismemberment is the first, and so far the only, Belarusian metal band to tour the United States.

== History ==
The band was formed by Arseniy Kovalchuk (guitars) and Valeriy Kozhemyako (vocals), later hiring bassist Viktor Kanashevich and drummer Vladislav Martirosov. In 2010, the band released their first studio album, Butcher Basement, which allowed them to become known beyond Belarus and to start touring across Europe. Their second album, Serial Urbicide (2013), was favorably received by the specialized press. However, Kozhemyako departed from the band in 2014. Following a long futile search for a new vocalist, Martirosov switched from drums to vocals in 2016, and the band hired Denis Poluyan as their new drummer.

In November 2021, the band signed to Unique Leader Records and announced that they were working on new material. On May 5, 2023, the band released their third album, entitled Dehumanization Protocol. From 2021 to 2024, singles and music videos were released for the songs "Protonemesis", "Agony Incarnate", "Extermination Factory", "Corpsepit", and "Terror Domination". The album received positive reviews from critics.

In March and April 2024, the group went on a European tour to promote Dehumanization Protocol. In February and March 2025, the band took part in Aborted's 'Terrifying North America' tour, replacing Stabbing after that band dropped out of the tour. Extermination Dismemberment has performed in all shows from the tour except the ones in Canada scheduled for February 25 and 26. Also in the tour were Ingested and PeelingFlesh.

== Musical style ==
Extermination Dismemberment and its material have been described as brutal death metal, slam death metal and symphonic death metal.

== Members ==
Current

- Arseny Kovalchuk – guitars, backing vocals (2009–present)
- Viktor Kanashevich – bass (2010–present)
- Vladislav Martirosov – drums (2010–2016), lead vocals (2016–present)
- Alexander Kazakov – drums (2024–present)

Former

- Valery Kozhemyako – lead vocals (2009–2014, guested 2023)
- Denis Poluyan – drums (2016–2024)

== Discography ==
- Promo 2009 (demo EP) (2009)

No.	Title	Length
1.	"Ophthalmic Eyeing"	2:43
2.	"Ogre Orchardman"	3:24
Total length:		6:07

- Butcher Basement (13 December 2010)

No.	Title	Length
1.	"Commencement of End"	1:21
2.	"Slaughterer Chainsaw"	3:36
3.	"Resurrectionist Blasphemous"	2:55
4.	"Merciless Infanticide"	3:18
5.	"Brutality Great Battle"	2:31
6.	"Rotten Entrails"	2:10
7.	"Butcher Basement"	4:18
8.	"Gastrointestinal Rupture"	3:01
9.	"Bulldozer Massacre"	6:32
Total length:		29:42

- Drowned Through Four Ways of Vomiting (split album) (12 May 2012)

Begging for Incest
No.	Title	Length
1.	"Postmortem Facefuck"	3:45
2.	"Cuntpuncher"	3:04
3.	"Gangbang the Preteen"	3:20

Extermination Dismemberment
No.	Title	Length
4.	"Nursery Carnage"	3:31
5.	"Ogre Orchardman"	3:24
6.	"Ophthalmic Eyeing"	2:43

Goreputation
No.	Title	Length
7.	"Anal Trooper"	3:31
8.	"Condemned Visions of Perversdismembering"	3:48
9.	"Strangulation Slut Butchery"	2:06

Gutfed
No.	Title	Length
10.	"Cockslap Genocide"	2:19
11.	"Fontanel Penetration"	2:48
12.	"Impaled with Her Own Leg"	3:06
Total length:		37:25

- Serial Urbicide (27 May 2013)

No.	Title	Length
1.	"Evisceration Conceiving"	1:13
2.	"Disemboweled Engorgement"	4:01
3.	"Gutted Face"	3:08
4.	"Serial Urbicide"	3:59
5.	"Deconstructive Parasite"	5:17
6.	"Survival"	3:30
7.	"Devastation Squad"	3:23
8.	"Carnivore Outraged"	3:33
9.	"Bloodbath Religion"	3:49
10.	"Human Holocaust"	6:22
Total length:		38:15

- Dehumanization Protocol (5 May 2023)

No.	Title	Length
1.	"God Help Us"	1:00
2.	"Dehumanization Protocol"	4:24
3.	"Terror Domination"	4:55
4.	"Protonemesis"	4:10
5.	"Plague in the Guise of Flesh"	4:55
6.	"Omnivore"	3:00
7.	"Extermination Factory"	5:52
8.	"Agony Incarnate"	4:19
9.	"Humanity's Last Grief"	1:30
10.	"Sentenced to Extinction"	6:33
11.	"Ruins of Armageddon" (feat. Valery Kozhemyako)	8:09
12.	"Corpsepit"	4:39
Total length:		53:26

- Butcher Basement Revamped (re-recording album) (25 October 2024)

No.	Title	Length
1.	"Commencement of End"	1:21
2.	"Slaughterer Chainsaw"	3:50
3.	"Resurrectionist Blasphemous"	3:09
4.	"Merciless Infanticide"	3:30
5.	"Pathological Deformity"	3:02
6.	"Brutality Great Battle"	2:50
7.	"Rotten Entrails"	1:55
8.	"Butcher Basement"	3:58
9.	"My Bloody Show"	4:01
10.	"Bulldozer Massacre"	6:52
11.	"Babykiller" (Devourment cover)	4:04
Total length:		38:32

=== Singles/music videos ===
- "Omnivore" (2018)
- "Protonemesis" (2021)
- "Agony Incarnate" (2022)
- "Corpsepit" (2023)
- "Terror Domination" (2024)
- "Slaughterer Chainsaw (Revamped)" (2024)
