= Without Warning =

Without Warning may refer to:

== Film and television ==
- Without Warning, alternate title selected by contest for The Story Without a Name (1924)
- Without Warning!, a 1952 film noir
- Without Warning (1980 film), a film starring Jack Palance
- Without Warning (1994 film), a made-for-television science fiction film
- Without Warning, a 1999 made-for-television film starring Arkie Whiteley
- Without Warning, a 2002 film starring Elizabeth Rodriguez
- Best of the Best 4: Without Warning, a 1998 direct-to-video martial arts film
- Without Warning: The James Brady Story, a 1991 made-for-television film written by Robert Bolt
- Diagnosis Murder: Without Warning, a 2002 made-for-television film based on the TV series Diagnosis: Murder

== Music ==
- Without Warning (band), an American progressive metal band 1988–1998
- Without Warning (album), by 21 Savage, Offset, and Metro Boomin, 2017
- Without Warning, a 1985 album by Everyman Band
- Without Warning, a 2008 album by Thomas Ian Nicholas
- Without Warning, a 1991 album by Blaq Poet and DJ Hot Day, recording as PHD
- Without Warning, a 2023 EP by Fivio Foreign
- Without Warning, a 1983 album by Marilyn Scott
- "Without Warning", a song by The Soundtrack of Our Lives from Communion
- "Without Warning", a song by Thine Eyes Bleed from In the Wake of Separation
- "Without a Warning", a song by The Weeknd from Hurry Up Tomorrow

== Other media ==
- Without Warning (Birmingham novel), a 2008 alternative history novel by John Birmingham
- Without Warning, a 2014 mystery novel by David Rosenfelt
- Without Warning (video game), a 2005 third-person shooter

== See also ==
- No Warning (disambiguation)
