= Cranioclast =

Surgical instrument

A cranioclast (from Greek κρανίον kranion "head, skull" and -κλάστης -klastes "breaker") is a surgical instrument akin to a strong forceps. It was once used to crush and then extract the skull of a fetus so as to facilitate delivery in cases of obstructed labour.

== Pictures ==
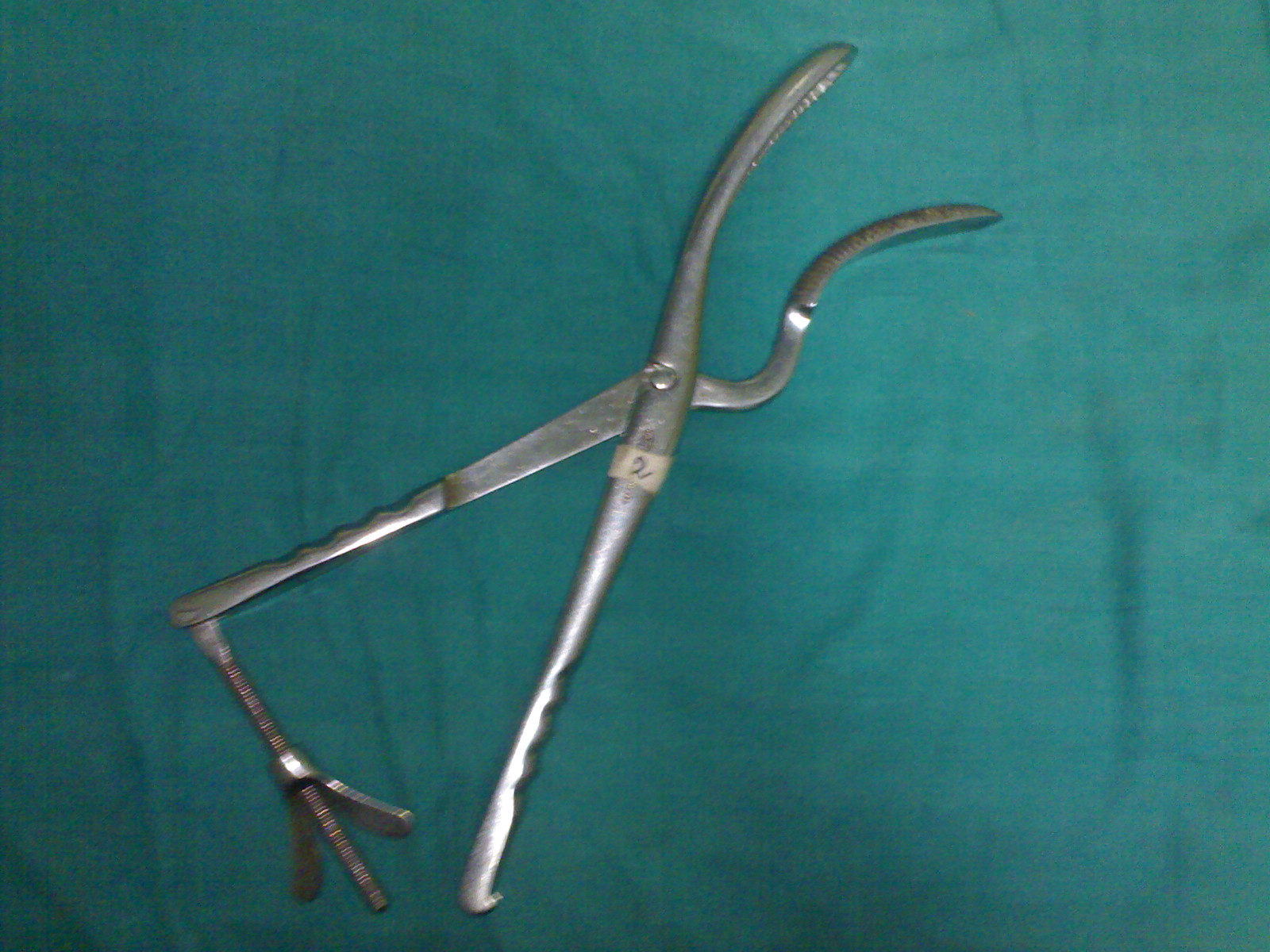
Open

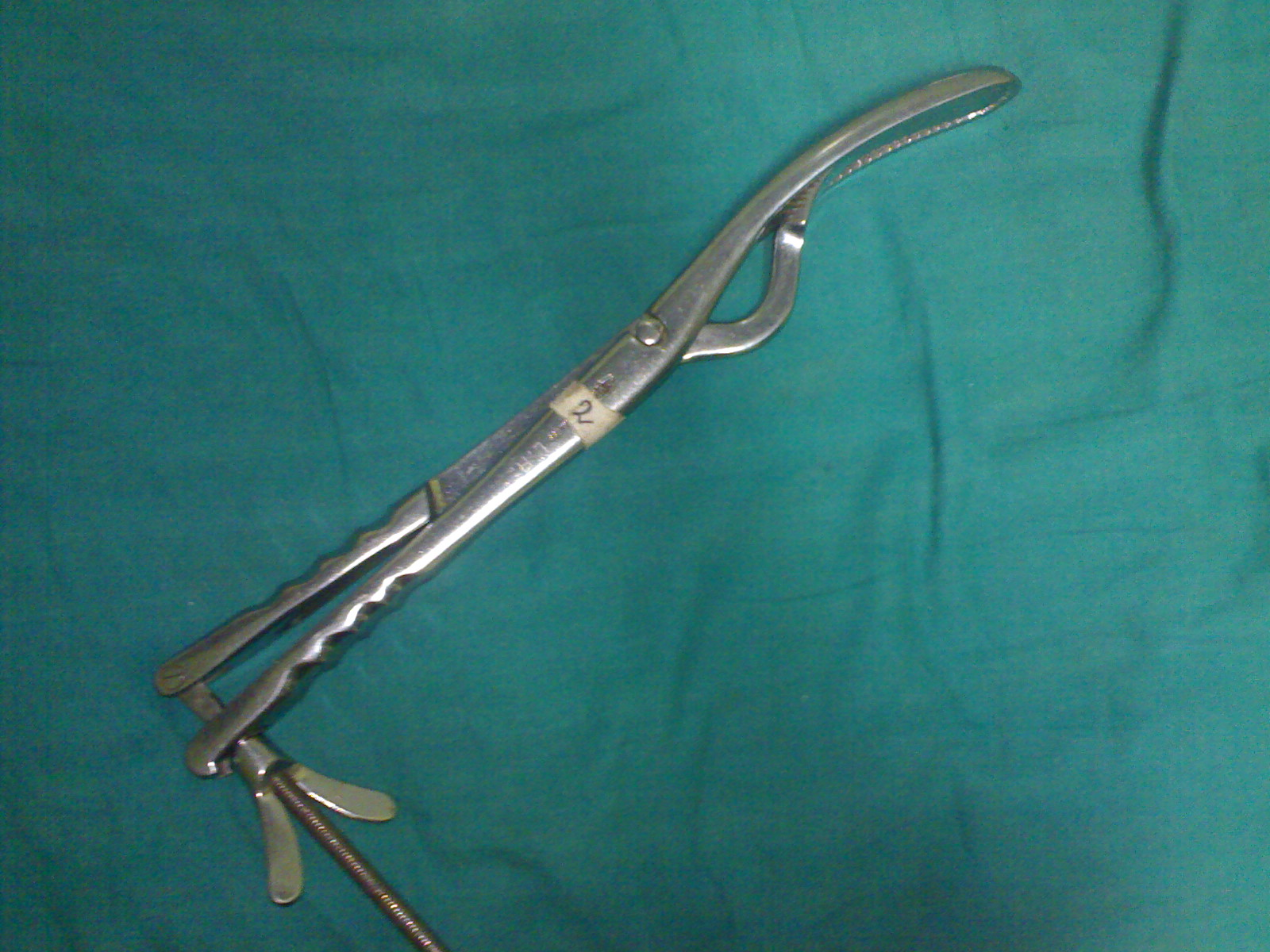
Closed

== See also ==
- Cephalotribe
- Puerperal fever
- Instruments used in general surgery
