= Katalepsy =

Russian death metal band

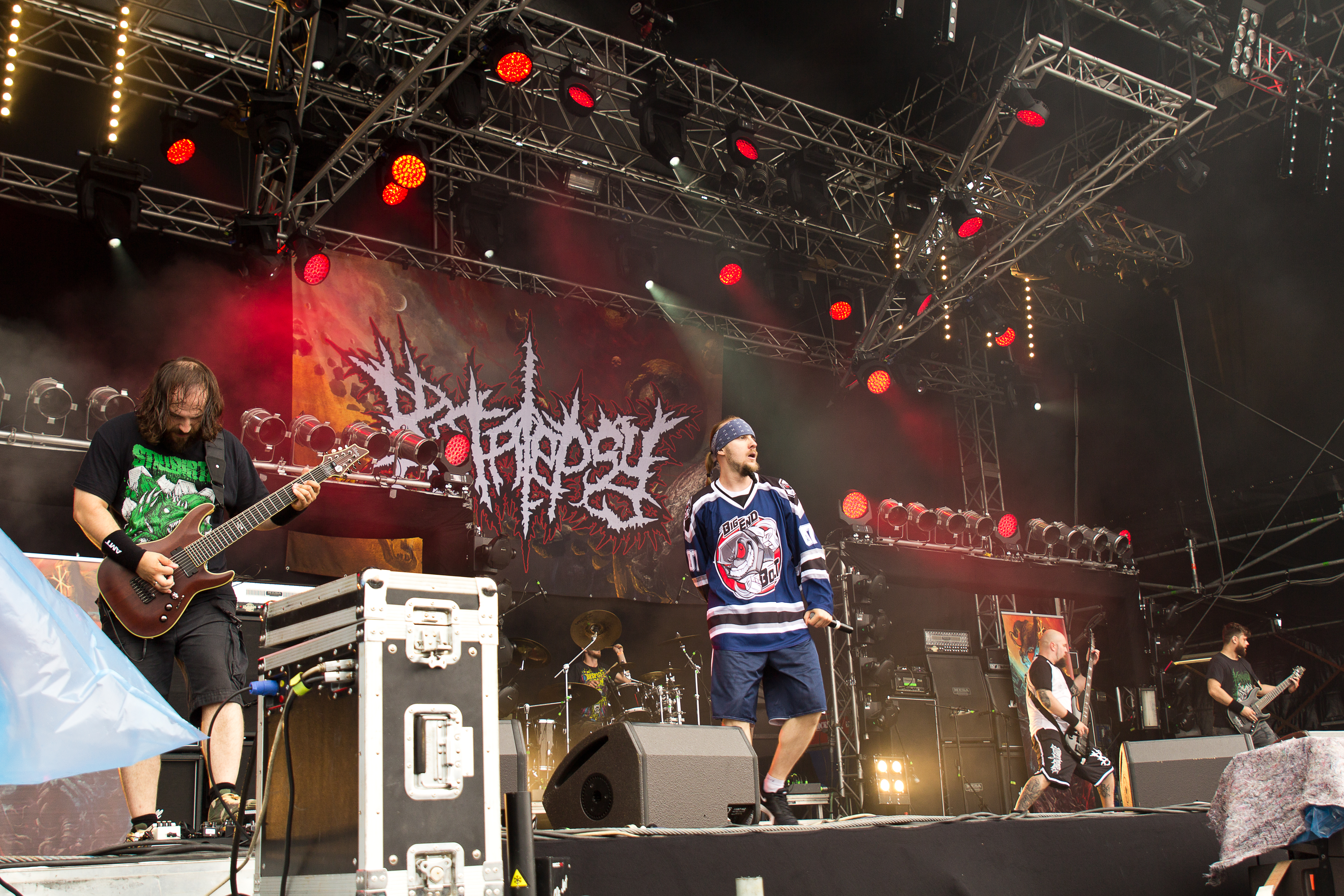
- Katalepsy performing in Schlotheim in 2016

Background information
- Origin: Moscow, Russia
- Genres: Brutal death metal; technical death metal; slam death metal (early)
- Years active: 2003–present
- Label: Unique Leader
- Members: Anatoly Shishilov; Andrey Patsionov; Anton Garasiyev; Igor Filimontsev
- Website: katalepsy.ru

Katalepsy is a Russian death metal band from Moscow. The group formed in 2003, and have released two split albums, one EP, three full-length albums, and one demo. The band's name is a variation of "catalepsy", a disorder involving catatonic schizophrenia. Some of the band's lyrics include gore, violence, splatter, murder and perversions. They are signed to Unique Leader Records. Following the departure of guitarist "Helv" in 2009, no original members remain in the band.

On 3 September 2021, guitarist Dmitry Dedov died due to HIV.

== History ==
=== Formation and split album (2003–2004) ===
The band formed in 2003 in Moscow. In 2004, they released a 28-song, 54-minute split album with the bands Smersh, Barbarity and Posthumous Blasphemer.

The band released the two-song demo Your Fear Is Our Inhabitancy.

=== Musick Brings Injuries (2007–2008) ===
Musick Brings Injuries

EP by Katalepsy
- Released: 23 February 2007
- Recorded: October 2006
- Genre: Slam death metal
- Length: 24:14
- Label: Soulflesh Collector

Katalepsy chronology
''Musick Brings Injuries'' (2007)	Triumph of Evilution (2008)

Professional ratings
Review scores
Source	Rating
Sputnikmusic	4/5 stars

In 2007, Katalepsy released the EP Musick Brings Injuries. In 2008, the band released another split album and an EP. Both EP and split album are titled Triumph of Evilution. Musick Brings Injuries, recorded, mixed and mastered in October 2006 at Z-Studio & Navahohut Sound, Zelenograd, Russia, except tracks 5 and 6, recorded and mixed in November 2006 at Zvuk l Golos Studio. It was released 23 February 2007. The album was released on iTunes on 25 December 2008.

==== Track listing ====
No.	Title	Length
1.	"Gialo"	03:32
2.	"Sluggish Cranial Grinding"	03:44
3.	"Rots of Fuck"	02:49
4.	"Rabid (Mortician cover)"	02:18
5.	"Consuming the Abyss"	03:40
6.	"Necroviolated to Liquid"	03:46
7.	"S.O.D. (Megadeth cover)"	04:25
Total length:		24:14

=== Autopsychosis (2010 – Present) ===
Autopsychosis

Studio album by Katalepsy
- Released: 8 January 2013; 22 January 2013 (Russia)
- Recorded: Recorded at Cosmos Studio & SFC Studio.
- Genre: Technical death metal
- Length: 40:10
- Labels: Unique Leader Records, Soulflesh Collector Records

Katalepsy chronology
Triumph of Evilution (2008)	''Autopsychosis'' (2013)

Professional ratings
Review scores
Source	Rating
Metal Storm	8/10 stars
Sputnikmusic	4.5/5 stars
Metal Forces	6.5/10 stars
Metal Temple	7/10 stars

In 2013, the band released their debut full-length album, Autopsychosis. The album was released on 8 January 2013 through Unique Leader Records, and through Soulflesh Collector Records on 22 January 2013. The album was available on iTunes on 8 January 2013. A music video for "Evidence of Near Death (E.N.D.)" was released on 21 September 2012.

==== Track listing ====
All lyrics are written by Anatoly, except Unearthly Urge to Supremacy and Gore Conspiracy by Mirus and Anatoly; all music is composed by Katalepsy, Serge Penzensky, Serge "Cann E" Levochkin.

No.	Title	Length
1.	"Lurking In the Depth"	3:39
2.	"Evidence of Near Death (E.N.D.)"	2:39
3.	"Body Bags for the Gods"	3:00
4.	"Cold Flesh Citadel"	3:41
5.	"The Pulse of Somnambulist"	4:04
6.	"Unearthly Urge to Supremacy"	3:37
7.	"Gore Conspiracy"	4:00
8.	"Amongst Phantom Worlds"	4:06
9.	"Needles of Hypocrisy (Interlude)"	1:59
10.	"Knifed Humility"	4:23
11.	"Taedium Vitae"	5:02
Total length:		40:10

== Members ==
Current

- Anatoly Shishilov – bass (2005–present)
- Anton Garasiev – guitars (2008–present)
- Igor Filimontsev – vocals (2011–present)
- Andrey Patsionov – drums (2007–2009, 2017–present)

Former

- Nikita Siminov – bass (2003–2005)
- Ardentis – vocals (2003–2005)
- Osip Danko – drums (2003–2006)
- Sergey Levochkin – guitars (2003–2007)
- Konstantin "Helv" Dyatlov – guitars (2003–2009, died in 2024)
- Nikita "Cain" Arzhantsev – vocals (2005–2007)
- Alexey Semyonov – drums (2006–2007)
- Ruslan "Mirus" Iskandaroff – vocals (2007–2011)
- Dmitry Dedov- guitars (2010–2021; his death)
- Evgeny Novikov – drums (2011–2017)

Timeline

== Discography ==
Studio Albums

- Autopsychosis (Unique Leader Records, 2013)
- Gravenous Hour (Unique Leader Records, 2016)
- Terra Mortuus Est (Unique Leader Records, 2020)

EPs

- Musick Brings Injuries (Soulflesh Collector Records, 2007)
- Triumph of Evilution (Soulflesh Collector Records, 2008)

Splits

- Barbarity / Katalepsy / Smersh / Posthumous Blasphemer (More Hate Productions, 2004)
- Triumph of Evilution (Soulflesh Collector Records, 2008)

Demos

- Your Fear Is Our Inhabitancy (Soulflesh Collector Records, 2010)
