= Internal Bleeding =

American death metal band

- Origin: Long Island, New York, U.S.
- Genres: Slam death metal; brutal death metal
- Years active: 1991–2005; 2011–present
- Labels: Pavement; Olympia; Unique Leader
- Members: Chris Pervelis; Chris McCarthy; Kyle Eddy; Ryan Giordano; Steve Worley
- Past members: Brian Richards; Tom Slobowski; John Colucco; Eric Wigger; Wallace Milton; Anthony Miola; Frank Rini; Ray Lebron; Guy Marchais; Brian Hobbie; Jason Liff; Keith DeVito; Bill Tolley; Joe Marchese; Shaun Kennedy
- Website: internal-bleeding.com

Internal Bleeding is an American death metal band formed on Long Island, New York in 1991. The band is viewed as the pioneer of the slam death metal genre. Prior to their disbandment in 2005, Internal Bleeding released four studio albums and went through extensive lineup changes. Since their 2011 reunion, they have released three additional studio albums.

== History ==
In the early 1990s, guitarist Chris Pervelis was a member of doom metal band Autumn Reign. Autumn Reign's music became heavier until they were playing a style similar to death metal. When this band disbanded, Pervelis sought out musicians to form a new band. Internal Bleeding's founding lineup consisted of Pervelis and Anthony Miola on guitar, vocalist Brian Richards, bassist Tom Slobowski and drummer Bill Tolley. In the same year, Richards and Slobowski departed the group, with bassist John Colucco and Autumn Reign vocalist Eric Wigger taking up their roles. This lineup recorded their debut self-titled demo tape. Soon after, Wigger was replaced with Wallace Milton, and Colucco was replaced with Brian Hobbie. The band recorded their second demo tape, Invocation of Evil. After Milton departed the band, Tolley briefly took on vocals to record their 1994 EP Perpetual Degradation.

Frank Rini was the band's next vocalist, recording their debut album, Voracious Contempt, released nationally through Pavement Records in 1995. The band released their second album, The Extinction of Benevolence, in 1997. Around this time, Pavement Records experienced financial difficulties, leading to the album having little promotion and Internal Bleeding rarely touring. Following this, Rini departed the group and Ryan Schimmenti replaced him. Schimmenti and Miola departed soon after, their roles filled by Ray Lebron and Guy Marchais, respectively. This lineup released the band's 1999 album Driven to Conquer. In 2000, Jason Carbon replaced Brian Hobbie. In December of the same year, Jerry Lowe became the band's vocalist. In mid-2002, Marchais was replaced with guitarist Frank Buffalino. In July 2003, Pervelis briefly departed the group, his role filled by Matt Ferrara. It was announced that the band's fourth album would be titled Hatefuel and released during summer 2003. The album's release was pushed back, and in May 2004, it was announced it would be titled Onward to Mecca. Following a tour opening for Six Feet Under, the album was released on September 7, 2004. A month after the album's release, Pervelis rejoined the band when Ferrara departed. The band toured the United States for two months in mid-2005, with support from Bodies in the Gears of the Apparatus and Strong Intention, before announcing their breakup.

In 2011, Tolley, Pervelis and Hobbie reunited Internal Bleeding, accompanied by bassist Jason Liff and vocalist Keith DeVito. The band's fifth studio album, and their first since reuniting, Imperium, was released on September 30, 2014. On February 9, 2016, the band announced Joe Marchese had replaced DeVito, and Shaun Kennedy had replaced Liff. The band supported Vader on a US tour in the spring of 2017. On April 20, 2017, founding drummer and the band's sole consistent member, Bill Tolley, died in a fire while working as a firefighter in Queens. His role was filled by Kyle Eddy. The following day, the band released a music video for their song "Final Justice". On November 2, 2018, they released their sixth studio album, Corrupting Influence. In 2019, Marchese and Kennedy departed the group with Steve Worley and Ryan Giordano filling their respective roles. On August 3 of the same year, the band released the single "Overthrow Creation".

The band was schedueld to perform at Milwaukee Metal Fest in June 2026. They had played the festival in 2024.

== Musical style ==
Internal Bleeding play a style of death metal which puts an emphasis on stark tempo changes, prominent bass guitar parts and rhythmic, palm-muted guitar riffs. One of the earliest pioneers of the slam death metal subgenre, their music incorporates elements of hardcore punk and hip hop into a death metal template. The band make heavy use of breakdowns, and integrate riffs that are less technical and vocals that are less intelligible than prior death metal bands. Blabbermouth.net writer Jay H. Gorania described the music as "Tough guy guitar chugging... layered atop mid-tempo pummeling, spiced up with occasional bursts of blasting belligerence." Their lyrics often discuss dark, socio-political issues, and some songs reference literature, such as "Anthems for Doomed Youth" referencing Wilfred Owen's "Dulce et Decorum est". They have also been cited by Decibel as pioneers of brutal death metal.

== Members ==
Current

- Chris Pervelis – guitar (1991–2003, 2011–present)
- Chris McCarthy – guitar (2015–present, live 2013-2015)
- Kyle Eddy – drums (2017–present)
- Ryan Giordano – bass (2019–present)
- Theo Vlahos – lead vocals (2026–present)

Former

- Bill Tolley – drums, backing vocals (1991–2003, 2011–2017; his death), lead vocals (1994)
- Anthony Miola – guitar (1991–1997)
- Brian Richards – lead vocals (1991)
- Tom Sobolewski – bass (1991)
- John Colucco – bass (1991)
- Eric Wigger – lead vocals (1991)
- Wallace Milton – lead vocals (1991–1994)
- Brian Hobbie – bass (1991–1999), guitar (2011–2015)
- Frank Rini – lead vocals (1994–1997)
- Ray Lebron – lead vocals (1998–2001)
- Guy Marchais – guitar (1998–2002)
- Jason Liff – bass (2011–2016)
- Keith DeVito – lead vocals (2011–2016)
- Joe Marchese – lead vocals (2016–2019)
- Shaun Kennedy – bass (2016–2019)
- Steve Worley - lead vocals (2019-2026)

Timeline

== Discography ==
Studio albums

- Voracious Contempt (1995)
- The Extinction of Benevolence (1997)
- Driven to Conquer (1999)
- Onward to Mecca (2004)
- Imperium (2014)
- Corrupting Influence (2018)
- Settle All Scores (2025)
