= No Warning (album) =

Studio album by No Warning
- Released: October 16, 2001
- Genre: Hardcore punk
- Length: 15:31
- Labels: Martyr Records, Bridge 9
- Producers: Ben Cook, No Warning

No Warning chronology
No Warning (2001)	Ill Blood (2002)

Professional ratings
Review scores
Source	Rating
AllMusic	link

No Warning is the eponymous debut album by Canadian hardcore band No Warning produced by singer Ben Cook and recorded by Greg Dawson at Harlow Sound in Rexdale, Ontario. It was released on 7" vinyl via the New York City label Martyr Records in the summer of 2001, but was re-released by Boston-based hardcore label Bridge 9 Records in October 2001, on CD with a different artwork.

== Track listing ==
1. "A Day in the Life" - 2:59
2. "Too Much to Bare" - 1:11
3. "My World" - 2:14
4. "Take It or Leave It" - 2:01
5. "Almost There" - 1:39
6. "Wrong Again" - 2:28
7. "Taking Sides" (Demo)- 1:02
8. "Too Much to Bare" (Demo) - 1:11
9. "Deal with It" (Demo) - 1:26

== Personnel ==
- Ben Cook - vocals
- Matt Delong - guitar
- Jordan Posner - guitar
- Ryan Gavel - bass
- Jon Gerson - drums
