= No Warning (band) =

Canadian hardcore punk band

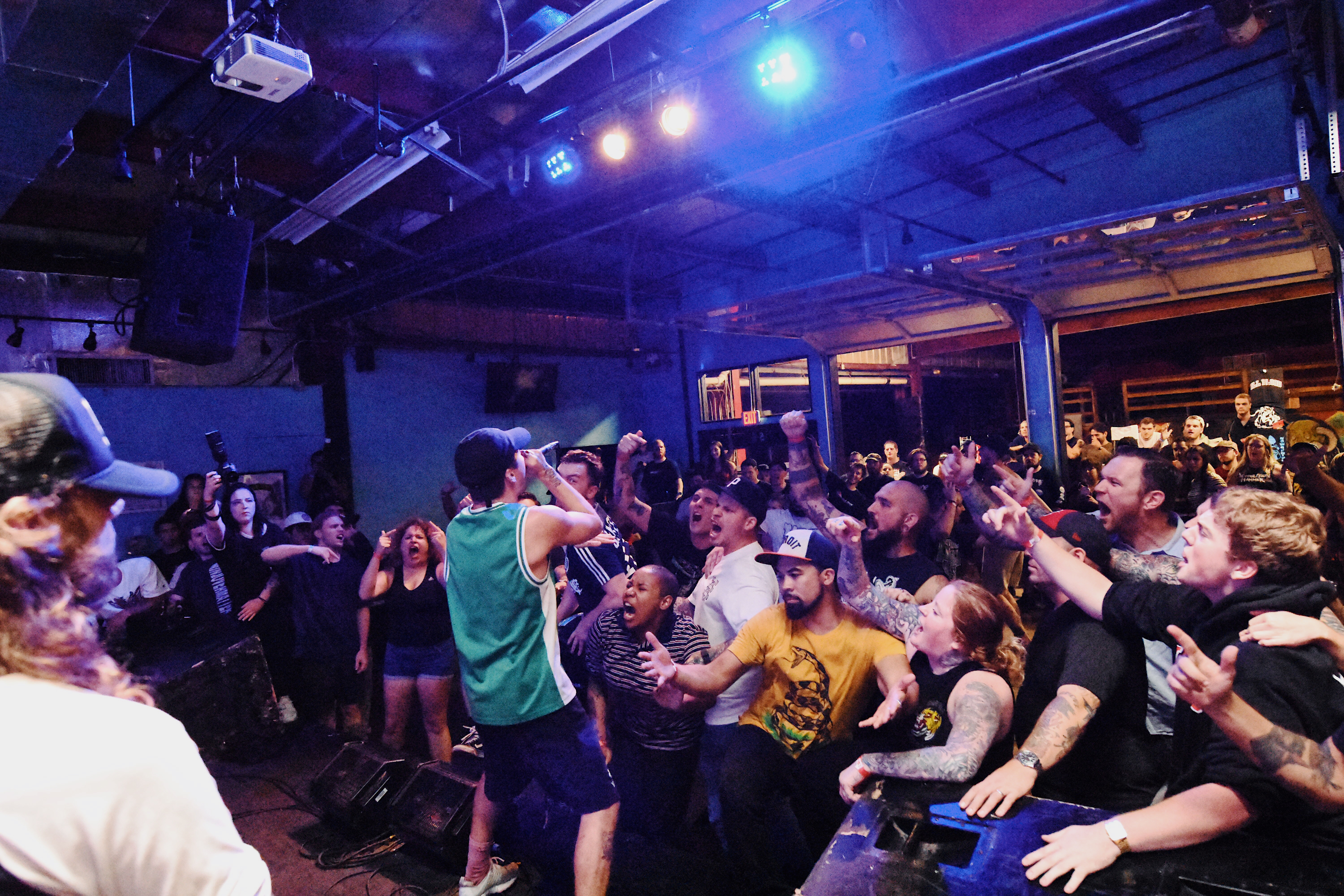
- No Warning in 2017

Background information
- Also known as: As We Once Were (1998–2000)
- Origin: Toronto, Ontario, Canada
- Genres: Hardcore punk; tough guy hardcore
- Years active: 1998–2005, 2013–present
- Labels: Bridge 9, Deathwish, Machine Shop, Last Gang, Flatspot
- Members: Ben Cook; Jordan Posner; Matt Delong; Jesse Labovitz; Ryan Gavel
- Past members: Zach Amster; Nate Helm; Jon Gerson; Christian Wilde; Arden Vallis; DJ Jacobs; Alan "Yeti" Riches; Kon "Bear" Putkin

No Warning is a Canadian hardcore punk band from Toronto.

== History ==
=== Early career and first two albums (1998–2003) ===
The band was founded in 1998 under the name As We Once Were by singer Ben Cook, guitarist Matt Delong, bass player Christian Wylde and drummer Alan "Yeti" Riches. Jordan Posner joined soon after on second guitar and Riches was replaced by Kon Putkin on drums. As As We Once Were, they released two demos, both in 1998, and contributed an exclusive song to Redstar Records' 1999 Various Artists compilation The Sound and the Fury.

The band subsequently renamed itself No Warning. Their first release under that name was a three-song demo tape. They released their 7" on New York label Martyr Records in 2001. Later that year, Boston-based Bridge 9 Records re-released the 7" on CD with different artwork and the demo tape as bonus tracks. The band continued to play shows across the east coast of the United States and Canada with hardcore punk bands such as Hatebreed, Madball, Cro-Mags, Sick of It All, Terror, and Bane. They also appeared at annual hardcore festivals such as Hellfest (New Jersey) and Posi Numbers Fest (Pennsylvania). In the fall of 2002, No Warning released what some fans consider to be the band's best work and a monumental album of that era of hardcore, Ill Blood. Just after its release, Jesse Labovitz joined the band and has been No Warning's primary drummer ever since.

=== One more album, breakup and subsequent activities (2004–2012) ===
Through more touring, the band came in contact with Sum 41 manager/producer Greig Nori, and signed with his management/production company. While working with Nori, the band developed a more radio friendly edge to their sound and signed to Machine Shop Records, a label founded by Linkin Park, and distributed through Warner Bros. Records. Suffer, Survive was released in late 2004.

The band continued to tour with more high-profile bands such as Linkin Park, Sum 41, Papa Roach, The Used, Fear Factory, as well as older punk band SNFU, and up and coming bands such as Funeral for a Friend and Saosin. The Band was a part Linkin Park's 2004 Projekt Revolution Tour on which bands from Korn to Snoop Dogg, Ghostface Killah, and Less Than Jake played. The band also played at the Summer Sonic Festival in Tokyo and Osaka, Japan.

After a lot of time spent on tour and different directions the band wanted to take, No Warning broke up in late 2005. Members went on to form bands such as Surplus Sons, Marvelous Darlings, and Millennial Reign, among other projects. Ben Cook now plays in Fucked Up. Jordan Posner plays in Terror.

=== Reunion (2013–present) ===
On June 5, 2013, Ben Cook told Exclaim! that No Warning has reformed and will release a seven-inch on his own label Bad Actors Inc. The seven-inch will include new song called "Resurrection of the Wolf" on the A-side and a cover of Violent Minds' "Bloodsucker" on the B-side. He also told Exclaim! that there are no plans on playing live. Direct quote from the man himself: "I have no interest playing live. I don't want dudes yelling in my face or jumping on me." In 2014, Ben Cook explained in another interview "Yeah, when I said that I was lying, straight up. Every time I ever do a No Warning interview, I like to throw in a few lies here and there. That's what the internet is for, right?" Considering, the band has played some shows in 2014 and 2015 in the US and Europe, it seems that the band still enjoys being on stage.

The first No Warning show in Europe was at Ieper Hardcore Fest in Belgium on August 8, 2014. They came over again in October 2015 to play 2 Shows in United Kingdom (London & Manchester) and 1 mainland show in The Netherlands (Dordrecht). Their first North American reunion show was a sold-out show on April 10, 2015, at Gamechanger World in Howell, New Jersey.

In 2015, Cook released a solo album, Ripe 4 Luv, under the stage name Young Guv. The album was a longlisted nominee for the 2015 Polaris Music Prize.

August 2015 saw another reunion show at Gatineau, Canada's Heart Fest where they headlined the Saturday of the three-day hardcore festival, a performance which was received very well. Following that performance, the band debuted the single "Friends in High Places," which would be released as a 7" flexi-disc via Lockin' Out Records and subsequently played their first hometown show since reuniting on April 2 at The Velvet Underground in Toronto. Antwon, Build and Destroy and Demolition also performed.

On August 24, 2017, the band announced a new album, Torture Culture, would be released on October 13 via Bad Actors, Inc. and Last Gang. They debuted the first song from the release, "In the City," on the same day. Exclaim! rated the album 9/10 and ranked it at number 6 on their Top 10 Metal and Hardcore Albums of 2017 list. Metal Hammer gave it 3.5 out of 5 stars.

On November 10, 2026, the band announced their official signing to Flatspot Records, with new music to be released in 2027.

== Band members ==
Current

- Ben Cook – vocals, lyrics (1998–2005, 2013–present)
- Jordan Posner – lead guitar (1998–2005, 2013–present)
- Matt DeLong - rhythm guitar (1998–2005, 2013–present)
- Ryan Gavel - bass (2001–2005, 2013–present)
- Jesse Labovitz - drums (2000–2005, 2013–present)

Past

- Zach Amster – bass (????–2005)
- Arden Vallis – drums
- Jon Gerson – drums
- DJ Jacobs – drums
- Nate Helm – drums
- Kon "Bear" Putkin – drums (1998–????)
- Alan "Yeti" Riches - drums (1998)
- Christian Wilde - bass (1998–2001)

Timeline

== Discography ==
Studio Albums
Album	Year	Label	Formats
No Warning	2001	Martyr Records Bridge 9	Digital, Vinyl, Cassette
Ill Blood	2002	Bridge 9	Digital, Vinyl, Cassette
Suffer, Survive	2004	Machine Shop	Digital, Vinyl, Cassette
Torture Culture	2017	Bad Actors In. Last Gang	Digital, Vinyl, Cassette

EPs
Album	Year	Label	Formats
Demo	2000	Self-released	Cassette

Singles
Song	Year	Label	Formats
"Resurrection of the Wolf"/"Bloodsucker"	2013	Bad Actors Inc.	Digital, Vinyl
"Friends in High Places"	2015	Lockin' Out Records	Digital, Flexi
