= Cephalotribe =

Medical instrument used in obstetrics

A cephalotribe was a medical instrument used in obstetrics to crush the skull of stillborn fetuses (cephalotripsy). It was used in cases of obstructed labor (dystocia) to aid delivery.

== See also ==
- Cranioclast
- Puerperal fever
- Instruments used in general surgery
