= Devourment =

American death metal band

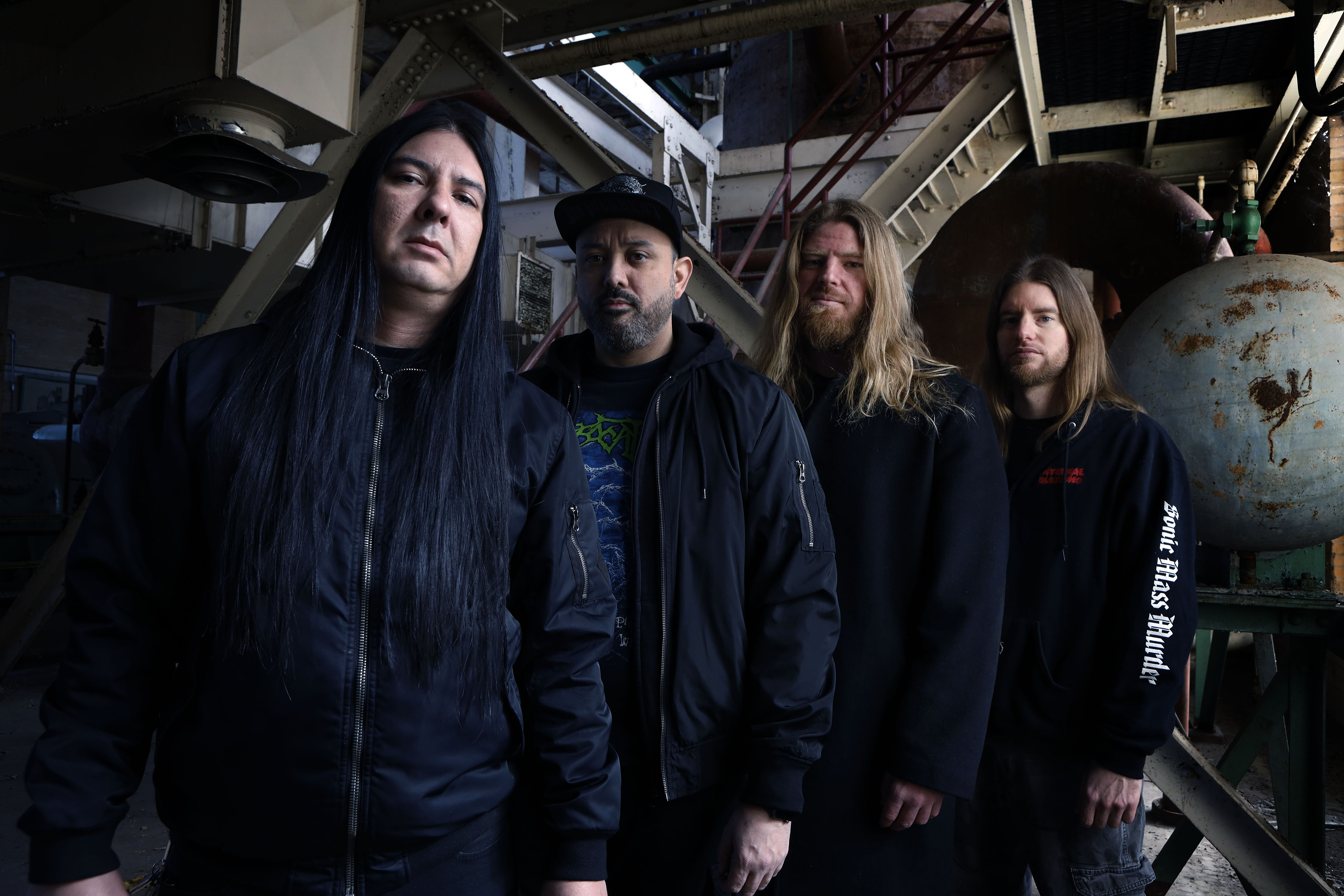
- Devourment in 2019

Background information
- Origin: Dallas, Texas, U.S.
- Genres: Slam death metal, brutal death metal
- Years active: 1995–1999, 2001, 2002, 2005–present
- Labels: Relapse, United Guttural, Corpse Gristle, Brutal Bands
- Members: Ruben Rosas; Brad Fincher; Marvin Ruiz
- Past members: Dave Spencer
- Website: www.devourmentofficial.com

Devourment is an American death metal band from Dallas, Texas. Formed in 1995, the band has split up and reformed three times leaving drummer Brad Fincher as the only original member. The current lineup is Fincher, vocalist Ruben Rosas, and guitarist Marvin Ruiz. The band is currently signed to Relapse Records, and was previously signed to Brutal Bands, United Guttural and Corpse Gristle Records. Devourment has also had albums re-released by other labels.

Since the band's foundation, Devourment released a demo, Impaled, and an album, Molesting the Decapitated, before disbanding due to the jailing of vocalist Ruben Rosas. There was a brief reformation of the band during his incarceration, which saw the initial release of the compilation album 1.3.8., and a brief reformation upon his release in 2002. The band reformed for a third time in 2005, and has since released two reissues of 1.3.8., two DVDs, and four full-length albums: Butcher the Weak, Unleash the Carnivore, Conceived in Sewage and Obscene Majesty.

== History ==
=== Early years ===
Devourment was formed in 1995 following the breakup of Dallas death metal band Necrocide. Necrocide's drummer, Brad Fincher, and guitarist, Braxton Henry, met up with former Meatus vocalist Wayne Knupp to play brutal death metal. However, the newly formed band achieved little—Knupp moved back to his hometown of Chicago, and Fincher moved to San Antonio for educational reasons. Months later, when the two of them had moved back to Dallas, Henry had formed his own band—Dead Industry. Knupp got in contact with someone he had known years earlier, Brian "Brain" Wynn, and they reformed the band. This lineup is often cited as the "original". The band then developed its first promo, featuring two songs, "Shroud of Encryption" and "Festering Vomitous Mass", which was produced by former and future guitarist Braxton Henry.

Over the next few months, Kevin Clark (formerly of Sintury) joined the band as a secondary guitarist, and Mike Majewski joined on bass. Majewski had previously worked publicizing the band and providing artwork. He had first seen Devourment when the band's only song was "Shroud of Encryption". The band recorded "Choking on Bile" which they added to their original demo. This was released in 1997 by Corpse Gristle Records under the name of Impaled. Knupp later left the band "due to some internal problems". He was replaced by Ruben Rosas, who played guitars and provided vocals in a local band called Detrimental.

In 1999, Devourment signed a record deal with United Guttural and started developing its first album, Molesting the Decapitated, again produced by Braxton. The album was released later that year. Reviews were positive, with Blas, of Global Domination, who praised the album for being so brutal, claiming that "if you look up the word 'Brutal' in the dictionary right now, you'd see Devourment's logo right next to the definition". He praised the vocals, but said that the drums, in places, let the album down due to them being too fast. Dan Staige, of Metal Review, said that the instruments were "remarkably balanced and crisp", and his only criticism was that the "ultra heavy breakdowns" "may sound a little monotonous", but that "you will still bang your head".

The band had a release show for the album in Colorado. Although Majewski claimed that this was in 1998, the album was apparently released in 1999, so he was probably mistaken. This show was alongside Macabre and Cephalic Carnage, among others. Shortly afterwards, Rosas was arrested and jailed for two and a half years, meaning the members of the band went their separate ways. Rosas's arrest was described by Majewski as the "last straw", as the band was becoming more and more business-like, with Wynn and his wife arranging concerts without consulting the rest of the band.

=== Reformation ===
Devourment reformed during Rosas's incarceration, with Knupp taking Rosas's place on vocals, and Braxton Henry rejoining the band in the place of Brian Wynn. The band recorded a single song, named "Babykiller", which was featured on a compilation album named Southern Uprising. The song was also featured on the band's own compilation album, 1.3.8., the title of which represents the one song, "Babykiller", with the three songs from Impaled, and the eight songs from Molesting the Decapitated. The compilation was released four times—once on Corpse Gristle Records while Rosas was in jail, once on Unmatched Brutality in 2004, once after Rosas's release while the band was working on new material, including the band's first DVD, on Displeased Records, and finally as a limited edition record by the label Night of the Vinyl Dead. Upon Rosas's release in 2002, he reformed the band with new members, featuring himself on vocals, guitarists Robert Moore and Kevin Clark, Jeremy Peterson on drums and Joseph Fontenot (later of Jacknife) on bass. Clark was then replaced by Chris Hutto of Ingurgitate. Rosas's new lineup played a few shows, but then split up again. Majewski later referred to the time between the band's two full-length albums, explaining that "Ruben and I both made attempts to get the band going again but both failed".

A few years later, Knupp, Rosas, and Majewski finally properly reformed Devourment. Eric Park, formerly of Suture, filled out the lineup which would record the second Devourment album. The band entered the studio in August 2005 to begin recording Butcher the Weak, and the completed album was released in November 2005. For this album, Majewski performed vocals, Rosas provided guitars and bass, and Park was on drums. According to Josh Thorne of fourteen g, the "production is a lot better" than it was on Molesting the Decapitated, but Majewski explained that both albums had been recorded in the same studio. The album contained artwork by Majewski, who works for a special effects company.

Felix Schoonen of Vampire Magazine said it was odd that the album was self-released by the band, asking, "why should a band like Devourment release their own album... every week countless useless releases are thrown on the market by bands that nobody will ever care for and Devourment is somehow forced to release its own album." In 2005, former Kill the Client drummer Chris Andrews joined the band on bass to round out the lineup for live shows. In 2006, the band signed a two-album deal with label Brutal Bands, and proceeded to re-record and re-release Butcher the Weak. The new release's cover was yellow, while the self-released version sported a green cover, though they bore the same design.

On September 15, 2007, Wayne Knupp died of multiple organ failure due to alcohol abuse. Despite no longer being with Devourment, his links with the band were widely reported, including his guest appearance with Devourment at the Central Illinois Metalfest earlier in the year. Knupp's girlfriend posted a message on his Myspace profile confirming his death and thanking people for their support and messages. In an interview with SMNnews.com, Majewski spoke of the impact of the death on the band, saying,

It had a big impact. He was a founding member and really created the vocal style we are known for. Just felt like part of the band died too. Like when he died, it was just weird to think about doing shows or recording without him around, even if he was no longer in the band. He was a good person and definitely deserves to be remembered.

Since Butcher the Weak, Devourment recorded new material for compilation albums and continued to tour. The band appeared at various festivals, including Central Illinois Metalfest, The Goregrowler's Ball and Germany's Fuck the Commerce. Devourment also released its second DVD in January 2007. In an interview with SMNnews.com in October 2007, Majewski said that the band aimed to complete a third studio album by mid-2008 which saw them performing less in 2008.

=== 2009–present ===
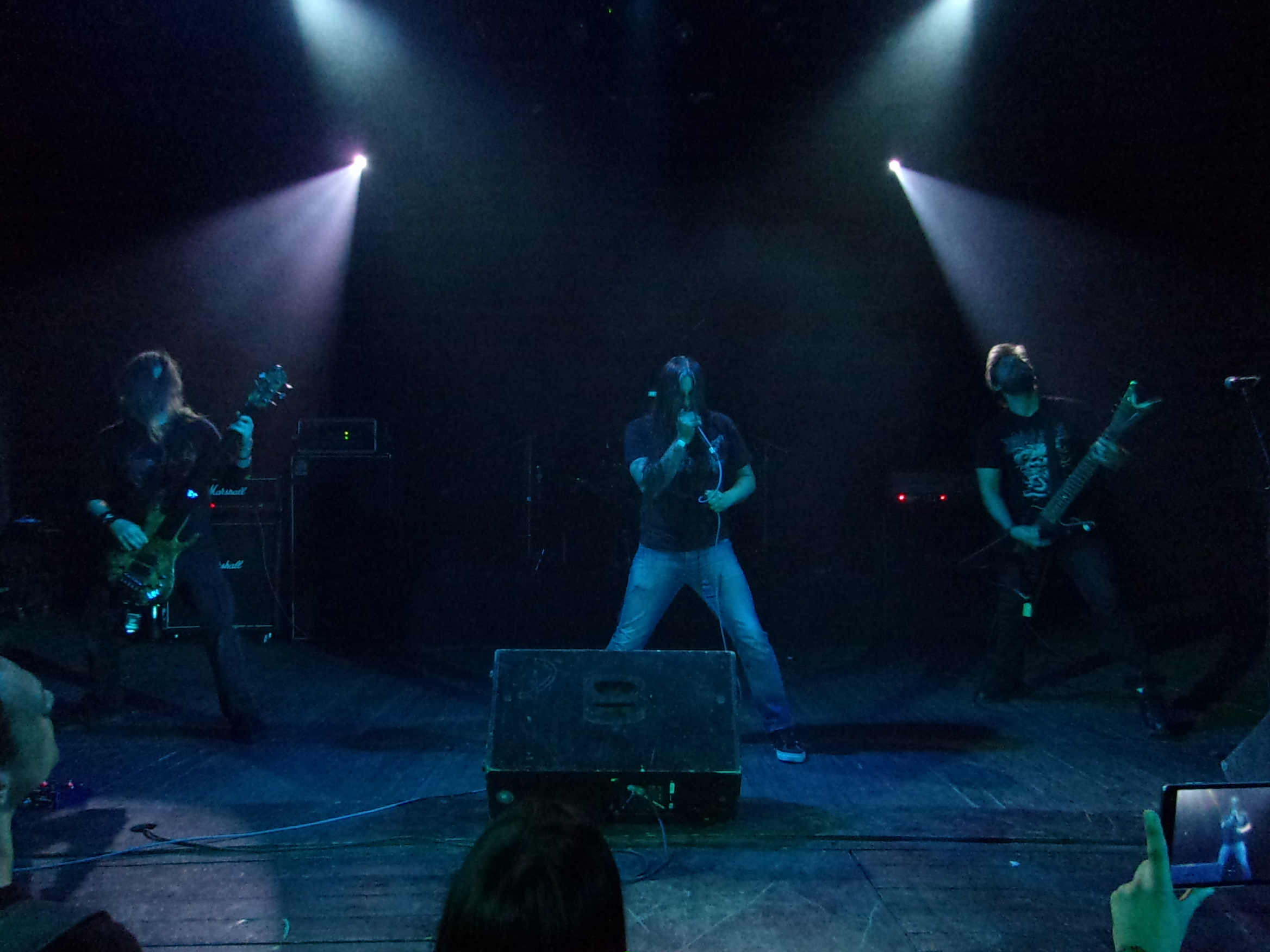
Devourment performing in 2016. Left to right: Dave Spencer, Ruben Rosas, Chris Andrews.

Devourment's third full-length studio album, Unleash the Carnivore, was released in 2009 through Brutal Bands. The cover features artwork by artists Dan Seagrave and Pär Olofsson. Unleash the Carnivore was followed in 2010 with the "Unleash the Carnivore tour". On July 14, 2010, Devourment announced that the band had signed with Relapse.

Devourment began writing new material in 2011, and traveled to St. Petersburg, Florida in June 2012 to record its fourth album. In January 2013, Devourment released a promotional single for the song "Fifty Ton War Machine". The new album, titled Conceived in Sewage, was recorded with Erik Rutan, and was released on February 19, 2013.

The band intended to play a 2013 fall US tour headlined by Dying Fetus and supported by Exhumed, Waking the Cadaver and Abiotic, but dropped off the tour roughly three months in advance. This caused speculation that the band had broken up or would be breaking up due to it being Devourment's second planned line of concert appearances that year that went abandoned. However, these concerns were dispelled by Majewski, with the statement, "Just to squash rumors, Your ol pals Devo are not broken up!"

On May 19, 2014, Devourment announced that Majewski and drummer Eric Park quit the band. Ruben Rosas moved from his position from guitar to vocals while bassist Chris Andrews moved to playing guitar. Brad Fincher (who quit Devourment in 2001) rejoined the band on drums, and Meshiha bass player Dave Spencer joined on bass.

Devourment began writing new songs with the revamped line-up in late 2014. They entered the studio in late-2018 to record their fifth full-length album, Obscene Majesty, with Producer D. Braxton Henry. The first single, "Cognitive Sedation Butchery", launched online June 18, 2019. This is their first album in six years and first with Ruben Rosas on vocals and Brad Fincher on drums since Molesting the Decapitated in 1999. The album was released on August 16 through Relapse Records. Loudwire named it one of the 50 best metal albums of 2019.

On June 11, 2026, Devourment released a three-song EP, Pious Impiety.

== Members ==
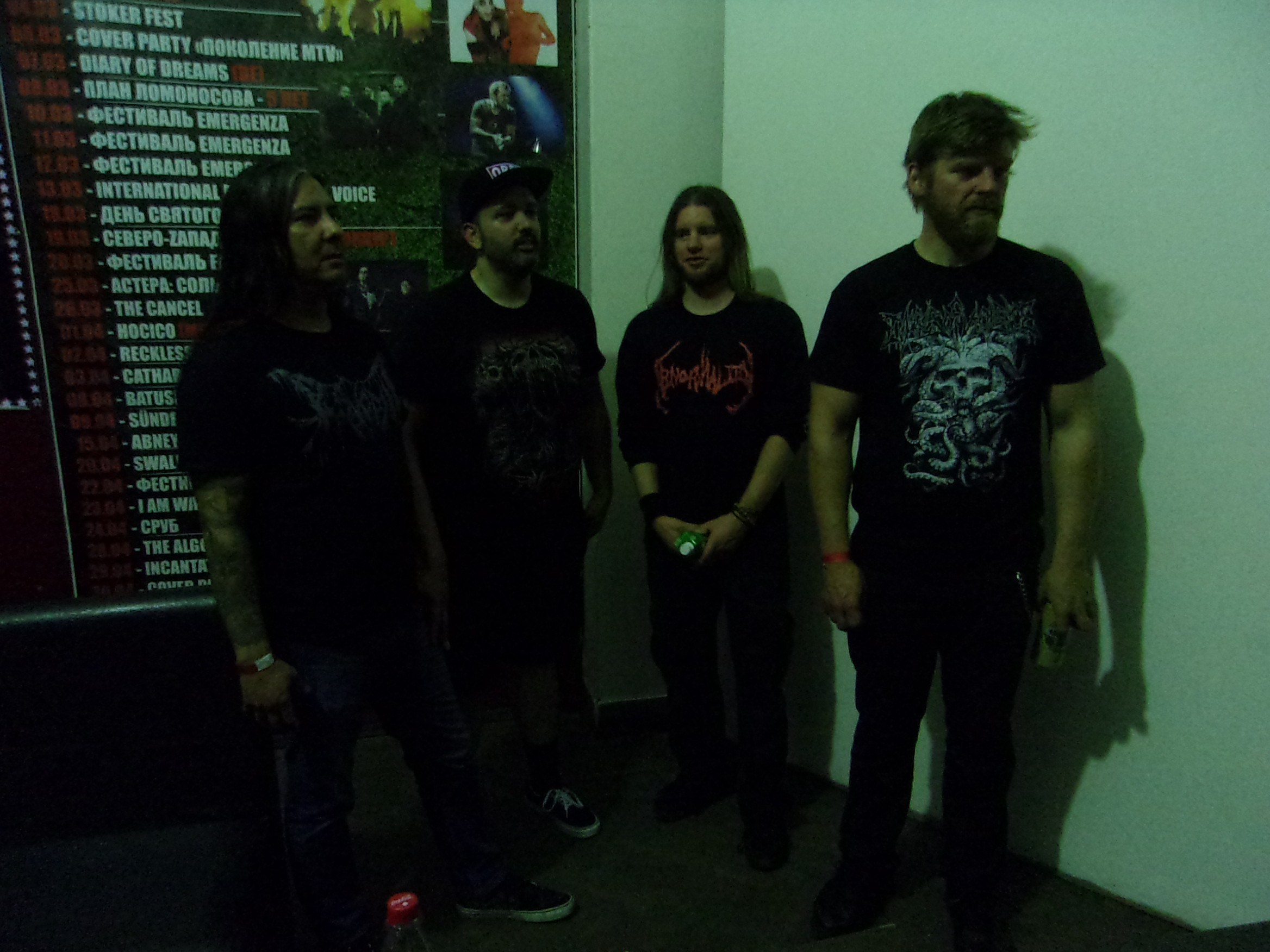
Devourment in 2016. From left to right: Ruben Rosas, Brad Fincher, Dave Spencer, Chris Andrews.

=== Current members ===
- Ruben Rosas – vocals (1998–1999, 2002, 2014–present), guitars (2005–2014)
- Brad Fincher – drums (1995–1999, 2001, 2014–present)
- Marvin Ruiz – guitars (2023–present)

=== Former members ===
- Braxton Henry – guitars (1995, 2001)
- Wayne Knupp – vocals (1995–1998, 2001; died 2007)
- Brian Wynn – guitars (1996–1999)
- Kevin Clark – guitars (1996–1999, 2001)
- Mike Majewski – bass (1997–1999, 2001), lead vocals (2005–2014)
- Robert Moore – guitars (2002)
- Chris Hutto – guitars (2002)
- Joseph Fontenot – bass (2002)
- Jeremy Peterson – drums (2002)
- Eric Park – drums (2005–2014)
- Chris Andrews – bass (2005–2014), guitars (2014–2023)
- Dave Spencer – bass (2014–2026)

== Discography ==
=== Studio albums ===
Title	Album details
Molesting the Decapitated	Released: May 1999 (US); Label: United Guttural Records; Formats: CD, vinyl
Butcher the Weak	Released: November 11, 2005 (US); Label: self-released, Brutal Bands; Formats: CD, digital download
Unleash the Carnivore	Released: June 26, 2009 (US); Label: Brutal Bands; Formats: CD, digital download
Conceived in Sewage	Released: February 19, 2013 (US); Label: Relapse Records; Formats: CD, digital download
Obscene Majesty	Released: August 16, 2019 (US); Label: Relapse Records; Formats: CD, digital download

=== Demos ===
- Impaled – Corpse Gristle Records (1997)
- Promo 1997 (1997)
- Promo 1999 (1999)

=== EPs ===
- Pious Impiety – Relapse Records (2026)

=== Singles ===
- "Kill That Fucking Bitch" (rehearsal, 2002)
- "Fifty Ton War Machine" (promo, 2012)

=== Compilations ===
- 1.3.8. – Corpse Gristle Records (2000), Unmatched Brutality (2004), Displeased Records (2004), Night of the Vinyl Dead (2006)

== See also ==
- Music of Dallas
