= Brutal death metal =

Music subgenre

- Stylistic origins: Death metal; grindcore; New York hardcore
- Cultural origins: Early 1990s, New York, United States
- Typical instruments: Electric guitar, bass guitar, drums, vocals

Subgenres
- Slam death metal

Other topics
- Beatdown hardcore, deathcore

Brutal death metal is a subgenre of death metal that privileges heaviness, speed and complex rhythms over other aspects, such as melody and timbres. The genre was pioneered in the early 1990s by Suffocation and other groups from New York including Mortician, Skinless and Malignancy. Its subgenre slam death metal quickly developed, played by Internal Bleeding, Devourment and Cephalotripsy, putting a greater emphasis on the genre's mid-tempo, groove sections and breakdowns. During the mid–1990s, a prominent wave of groups emphasising the genre's more technical aspects developed with Cryptopsy, Nile, Origin and Dying Fetus. During the mid–2000s, there was a revived interest in brutal death metal and slam, a period which produced Katalepsy and Ingested, and saw groups lean into cleaner production styles.

== Characteristics ==
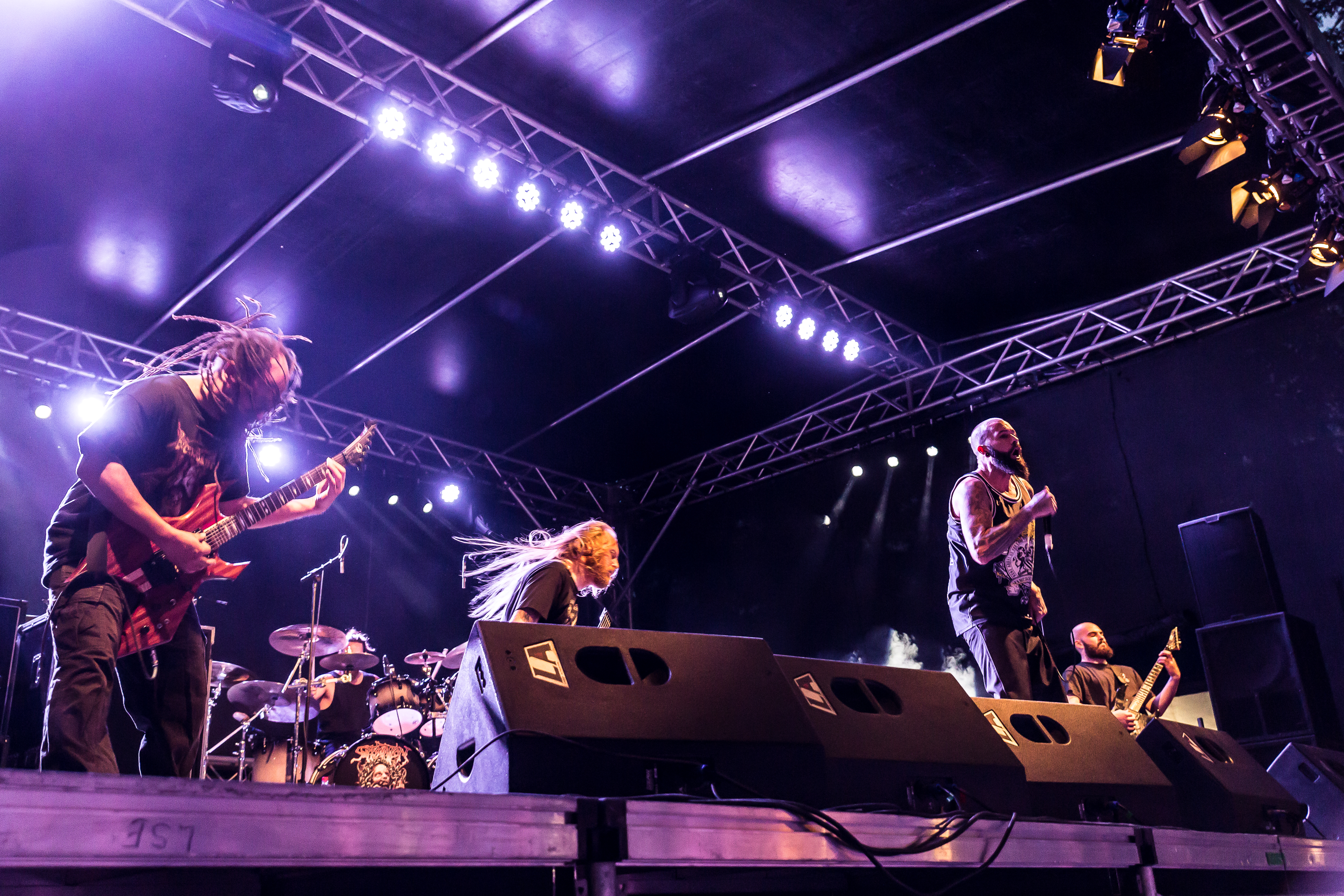
Suffocation popularised brutal death metal on Effigy of the Forgotten (1991)

Brutal death metal is characterised by its use of death growls deeper than convention death metal vocals (usually referred to as "gutturals" to distinguish from regular growls), tempos that are either groove driven or incredibly high tempo, downtuned guitars and pinch harmonics. The style blends death metal with grindcore. Metal Hammer editor Dom Lawson also cited the influence of New York hardcore as a key part of the sound. Academic Michelle Phillipov defined it as "privileg[ing] heaviness, speed, and rhythmic complexity over conventional signifiers of melody and tunefulness."

== History ==
=== Precursors ===
"Brutal" as an adjective to describe death metal existed since the genre's origins. Czech band Krabathor released the Brutal Death demo tape in 1988, while Swedish band Carnage formed the same year and self-described as brutal death metal.

Loudwire credited Altars of Madness (1989) as the album that "redefined what it meant to be heavy while influencing an upcoming class of brutal death metal." Academic Michelle Phillipov credited Cannibal Corpse's albums Eaten Back to Life (1990) and Butchered at Birth (1991) as "important precursors" of the brutal death metal genre, due to their complex rhythms, speed, staccato vocals patterns, palm muted guitar riffs and lack of melody. The albums also helped to popularise the cartoonish gore imagery and lyrics which would come to be present in the genre. At the time of their release, these albums were purely considered brutal death metal.

=== Origins ===
According to Loudwire, brutal death metal is widely considered to have been pioneered by Long Island, New York band, Suffocation, formed in 1988, and popularised on their debut album Effigy of the Forgotten (1991). Influenced by Florida death metal and New York hardcore, they created a sound which put an emphasis on slow, rhythmic, palm muted guitar riffs written in order to encourage moshing, which would later be termed "slam riffs", as well as downtuned guitars, breakdowns and time and tempo changes. Their style came to define the sound of New York death metal. Vocalist Frank Mullen originated a style of death growl that was deeper than those of prior death metal bands.

Many of the other early brutal death metal groups were too formed in New York, including Immolation, Incantation, Mortician, Skinless. and Malignancy. One sect of this scene, which included Internal Bleeding and Pyrexia, put a greater focus on the hardcore-inspired grooves and breakdowns, helping to pioneer the subgenre slam death metal. Decibel writer Dutch Pearce also credited Deeds of Flesh from Los Osos, California as a pioneer of brutal death metal.

=== Developments ===
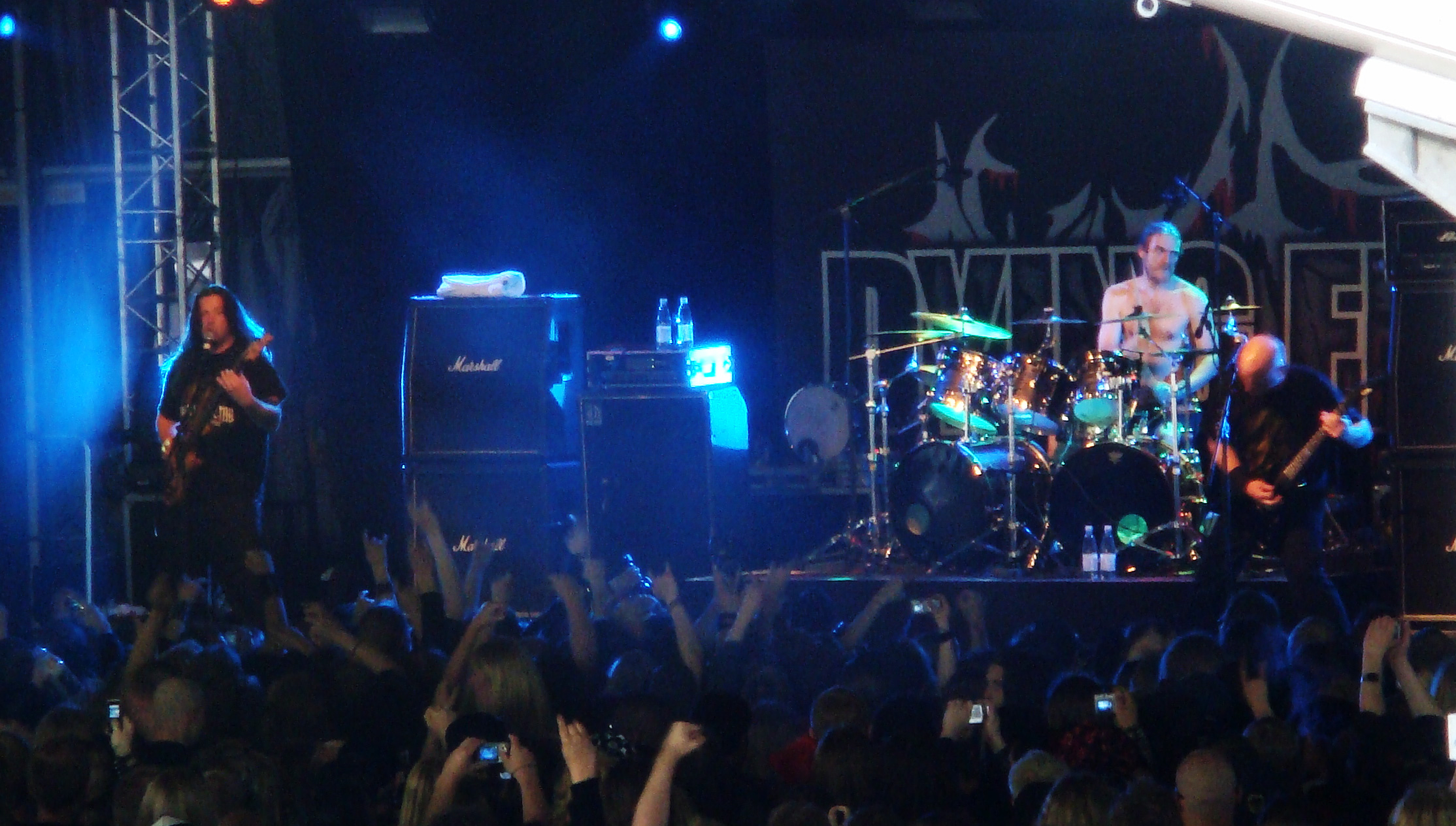
Dying Fetus, one of the most prominent acts to merge brutal death metal with technical instrumentation

In the mid–1990s, many bands began to push the genre into a more technically proficient direction, with Cryptopsy, Nile, Origin and Dying Fetus being forefront bands. Revolver editor Eli Enis, described Dying Fetus, "at the forefront of brutal death metal for the last three decades", by also putting an emphasis on the groovey riffing style of 1990s hardcore punk.

In the late 1990s, a brutal death metal scene formed in the Netherlands which included Severe Torture, Pyaemia, Disavowed and Prostitute Disfigurement.

By the 2010s, a prominent brutal death metal scene had formed in Russia. One of the frontrunners of this scene is Moscow's Katalepsy, whose debut album Autopsychosis (2013), was described by Distorted Sound writer Fraser Wilson as "a modern behemoth of slam", while their subsequent albums moved into a more technical brutal death metal sound.

== Slam death metal ==
Slam death metal
- Other names: Slam, slamming brutal death metal
- Stylistic origins: Brutal death metal; New York hardcore; hip-hop
- Cultural origins: 1990s
- Derivative forms: Beatdown hardcore; deathcore

Slam death metal (or simply slam) is a subgenre of brutal death metal which focuses on slam riffs. The genre originated from the 1990s New York death metal scene, incorporating elements of New York hardcore and hip hop music. In contrast to other death metal styles, it is not generally focused on guitar solos and blast beats; instead, it employs mid-tempo rhythms, breakdowns and palm-muted riffing, as well as hip hop-inspired vocal and drum beat rhythms. When blast beats are used, it is often traditional blasts and gravity blasts used only as accents. Syncopation between guitar and drums is also a focal point.

In addition to slower riffing, slam death metal is also said to be characterized by guttural vocals and a "high pitched, ringy" snare drum sound. The subgenre "shares some of the bounce and groove from nu metal," and tends to avoid the experimental elements common in early death metal.

The breakdown riff of Suffocation's "Liege of Inveracity" (1991) has been credited by Rolling Stone as the first slam riff in death metal. The first wave of bands in the genre were New York bands like Internal Bleeding, Pyrexia and Afterbirth, with notable groups from outside of this state from this time including Devourment and Cephalotripsy.

The name "slam" in reference to death metal was coined by the members of Internal Bleeding. In a 2024 interview, Internal Bleeding guitarist Chris Pervelis explained that because the band's emphasis on groove was to encourage moshing, they originally called their music "mosh" metal, "barbaric mosh" or "death mosh". However, drummer Bill Tolley associated the word "mosh" with the jovial tone of Anthrax. To avoid this association Tolley pushed for the word "slam" due to its early hardcore origins.

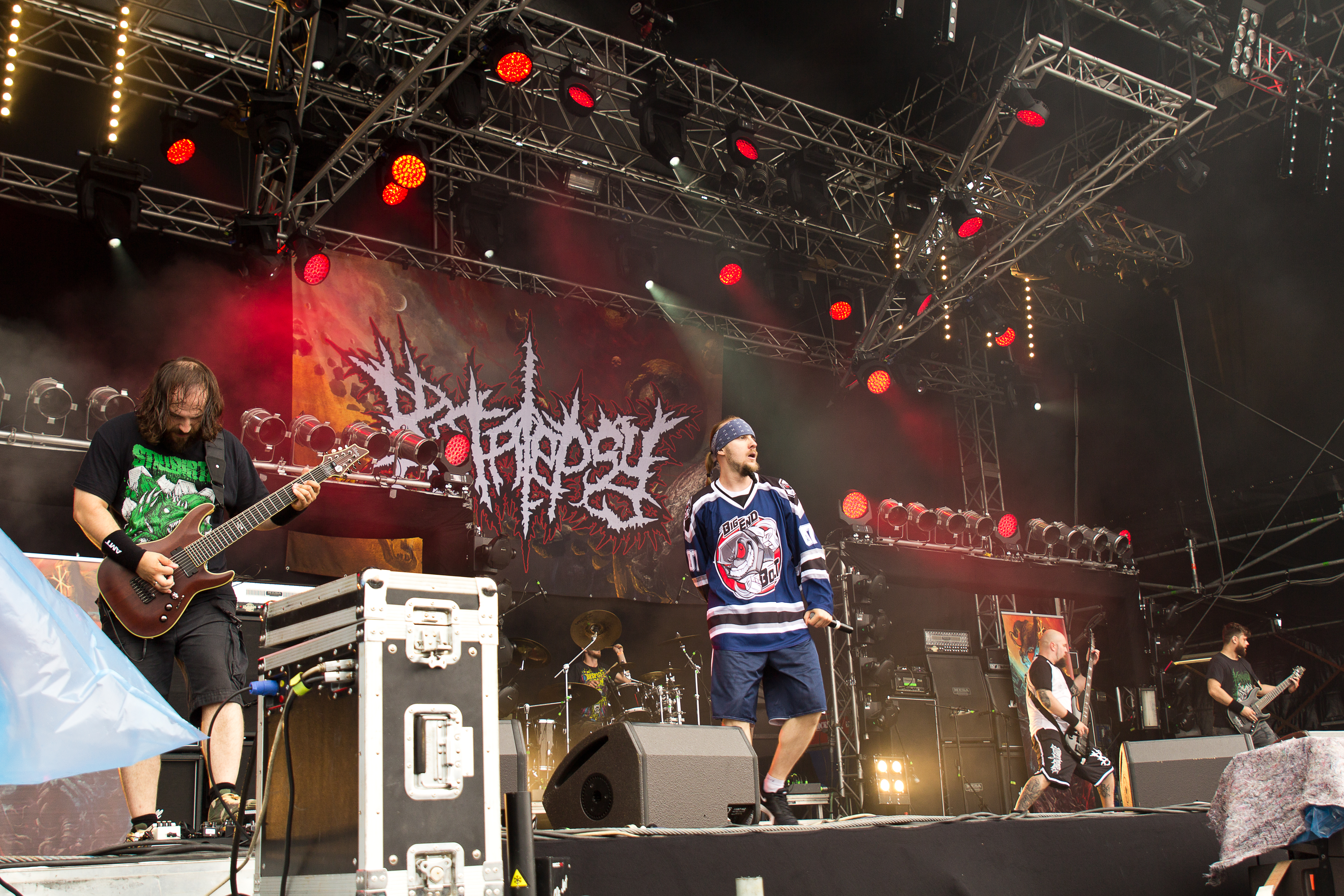
Russia's Katalepsy were a prominent slam death metal band in their early years

The popularity of deathcore and its shared interest in breakdowns led to a revived interest in slam beginning in the mid–2000s, seen through the popularity of groups including Infected Malignity and Abominable Putridity and the reformation of Devourment. This wave saw an increase in production quality in the genre, a contrast from the raw production of earlier bands. This wave was largely based online, particularly on social media sites, with the Facebook group Slam Worldwide playing a major role in promotion. This led to many groups forming outside of the genre's native United States, such as Extermination Dismemberment from Belarus, Coprocephalic from Taiwan, Acranius from Germany and a number of groups from the Philippines: Human Mastication, Nekroholocaust, Cranial Torture, Pus Vomit, Projectile Vomit and Impulsive Emesis. Furthermore, northern England, particularly Manchester and Liverpool, developed a scene during this wave, with groups including Ingested and Exhumation, as well as UK Slam Festival. To the extent that Distorted Sound magazine called Manchester "Slamchester". In a 2009 article by MetalSucks stated "slam is THE big thing in death metal right now, divisive as it is".

Slam was integral to the development of the genres beatdown hardcore and deathcore. Furthermore, elements of its sound, particular its distinctive riffing style, has been incorporated into merged with various genres including hardcore, black metal and general death metal.
