= Fuel. Transit. Sleep. =

EP by Crime in Stereo
- Released: 2006
- Recorded: 2005
- Genre: Punk
- Length: 5:42
- Label: Nitro Records
- Producer: Mike Sapone

Crime in Stereo chronology
The Troubled Stateside (2006)	Fuel. Transit. Sleep. (2006)	Crime in Stereo is Dead (2007)

Fuel. Transit. Sleep. is an EP by American punk rock band Crime in Stereo released through Nitro Records in 2006. All three of the songs on this EP were supposed to end up on the following full-length album The Troubled Stateside; however, the third track was cut out and later re-released in 2008 on the b-side compilation album "Selective Wreckage".

== Track listing ==
1. Slow Math
2. I'm on the Guestlist Motherfucker
3. When the Women Come Out to Dance

== Members ==
- Kristian Hallber – vocals
- Alex Dunne – guitar
- Mike Musilli – bass
- Scotty Giffin – drums
