= Everything and Nothing (disambiguation) =

Everything and Nothing is a non-charting compilation album by David Sylvian

Everything and Nothing may also refer to:

== Music ==
=== Albums ===
- Everything and Nothing, album by Hammock (band) 2016
- Everything and Nothing, album by Chingy
- Everything and Nothing Too, album by Amy Allison (2006)
- Everything and Nothing Less, live album by Chris McClarney 2015

=== Songs ===
- "Everything and Nothing", song from Vagabonds (The Classic Crime album)
- "Everything and Nothing", song by Vince Gill (with Katrina Elam) from These Days (Vince Gill album)
- "Everything and Nothing", song by The Boom Circuits from The Twilight Saga: Breaking Dawn – Part 2 (soundtrack)
- "Everything and Nothing", song by Taxiride from Electrophobia 2006
- "Everything and Nothing", song by Mudvayne L.D. 50 (album) and Kill, I Oughtta and from the Resident Evil soundtrack
- "Everything and Nothing", song by A Plea for Purging from A Critique of Mind and Thought 2007
- "Everything and Nothing", song by Sheer Terror from No Grounds for Pity 1996 compilation album
- "Everything and Nothing", song by Soft Play from Heavy Jelly 2024
- "Everything and Nothing Else", song by Austin Stone Worship from This Glorious Grace
- "Everything and Nothing Less", song by Jesus Culture from Let It Echo 2015

== Other ==
- Everything & Nothing, science documentary by Jim Al-Khalili
- Everything and Nothing: The Dorothy Dandridge Tragedy, on Dorothy Dandridge by Earl Conrad
