= Selective Wreckage =

Compilation album by Crime In Stereo
- Released: 2008
- Recorded: 2005–2007
- Genre: Melodic hardcore, hardcore
- Label: Bridge 9 Records

Crime In Stereo chronology
Crime in Stereo Is Dead (2007)	Selective Wreckage (2008)	I Was Trying to Describe You to Someone (2010)

Professional ratings
Review scores
Source	Rating
Alter The Press	???

Selective Wreckage is a b-sides collection by melodic hardcore group Crime in Stereo. This compilation features unreleased songs that documented the band's evolution from the 2005 recording sessions for The Troubled Stateside and 2007's Crime in Stereo Is Dead, as well as tracks from the never released split EP with Capital, and songs from many other various recording sessions.

== Track listing ==
1. "(Panned Auras)"
2. "Everywhere and All the Time"
3. "Desertbed"
4. "Love"
5. "When the Women Come Out to Dance"
6. "Takbir"
7. "The Bride"
8. "Four X's"
9. "These People Ought to Know Who We Are and That We Are Here"
10. "Let Me Take You Out"
