= Solo un grande sasso =

Solo un Grande Sasso

Studio album by Verdena
- Released: September 14, 2001
- Genre: Alternative rock; psychedelic rock
- Length: 60:00
- Label: Black Out; Mercury; Universal
- Producer: Alberto Ferrari; Manuel Agnelli

Verdena chronology
Verdena (1999)	Solo un Grande Sasso (2001)	Il Suicidio dei Samurai (2004)

Solo un grande sasso is the second album by the Italian alternative-rock band Verdena, released in 2001.

In September 2001 the album peaked at number 6 in the Italian Chart.

== Track list ==
1. La tua fretta – 2:35
2. Spaceman – 4:35
3. Nova – 7:44
4. Cara prudenza – 4:15
5. Onan – 5:12
6. Starless – 7:00
7. Miami Safari – 3:35
8. Nel mio letto – 3:04
9. 1000 anni con Elide – 6:35
10. Buona risposta – 5:14
11. Centrifuga – 8:16
12. Meduse e tappeti – 3:16
13. Il tramonto degli stupidi (only in the vinyl press)
