= Wow (Verdena album) =

Studio album by Verdena
- Released: 2011
- Genre: Pop rock: psychedelic rock; neo-psychedelia; neoprogressive
- Length: 83:26
- Label: Blackout; Universal
- Producer: Alberto Ferrari

Verdena chronology
| Requiem (2007) | Wow (2011) | Endkadenz Vol. 1 (2015) |

Wow is the fifth album by the Italian alternative-rock band Verdena, released in 2011. It was released as a double CD on January 18, 2011, by Universal Music Group. It was released on this date in Italy and Switzerland. Wow was released on vinyl on January 30, 2011, and on September 20, 2011, was released in deluxe version, with two digipak format discs are joined to a DVD Wow Tour 2011, featuring amateur photographs taken by the band throughout the tour, hence the name Amatour.

The album was certified gold by the Federation of the Italian Music Industry.

== Track listing ==
Disc one

1. Scegli me (Un mondo che tu non vuoi) – 2:31
2. Loniterp – 4:10
3. Per sbaglio – 3:24
4. Mi coltivo – 4:41
5. Razzi arpia inferno e fiamme – 3:01
6. Adoratorio – 2:29
7. Miglioramento – 4:14
8. Il nulla di O. – 2:09
9. Lui gareggia – 1:44
10. Le scarpe volanti – 3:02
11. Castelli per aria – 3:57
12. Sorriso in spiaggia pt. 1 – 2:42
13. Sorriso in spiaggia pt. 2 – 4:40

Disc two

1. Attonito – 2:05
2. È solo lunedì – 4:49
3. Tu e me – 1:52
4. Badea blues – 3:27
5. Nuova luce – 4:35
6. Grattacielo – 2:51
7. A capello – 2:26
8. Rossella roll over – 3:28
9. Canzone ostinata – 2:31
10. 12,5 mg – 1:11
11. Sul ciglio – 0:54
12. Letto di mosche – 2:38
13. La volta – 3:36
14. Lei disse (Un mondo del tutto differente) – 4:00
