= The Method (album) =

Studio album by Killing Time
- Released: April 1997
- Recorded: June – August 1996
- Studio: LoHo Studio, New York City, U.S.
- Genre: Hardcore punk
- Length: 36:48
- Label: Blackout
- Producer: Dean Rispler; Killing Time

Killing Time chronology
Unavoidable EP (1995)	The Method (1997)

Professional ratings
Review scores
Source	Rating
AllMusic	link

The Method is the second full-length album by New York hardcore band, Killing Time. It was recorded between June and August 1996 and released on Blackout Records in April 1997. It was the band's first full-length release since 1989's Brightside, but the band split up soon after its release, despite its success in the hardcore punk field. Drago is now a police officer, Comunale works in the field of finances, and the rest of the band are still involved in the scene – either playing with bands, or managing and producing them.

The band's previous effort had been a 1992 EP, Happy Hour – the title track of which they re-recorded for this release – and a 1995 EP, Unavoidable, which contained versions of three of the songs on this album. Dean Rispler, bass player with fellow NYHC band, Murphy's Law co-produced the album with the band. The album also contains a cover version of a Major Conflict track, "Outgroup".

== Overview ==
Seven years on from Brightside and it would seem the band have not changed. The songs are, once again, short and brutal with not a single one clocking in at over three minutes. However, they had coped with the rejection and apathy towards their 1992 Happy Hour EP material by extracting the good parts – the increased melody and technical guitar work – and combined it with the attitude and brutality of the Raw Deal/Brightside seminal material. The addition of a second guitarist in 1991 had allowed the band to expand the sound in the first place and on this album it serves to thicken the sound and allow for the odd – albeit short, but nevertheless appropriate – guitar solo. The band hadn't just gone for speed and brutality either with the inclusion of a few slower, more thoughtful tracks which is the band, kind of, saying, "Listen up! We can play both ways!".

== Track listing ==
- All songs written by Killing Time, unless stated
1. "Used to It" – 1:47
2. "It Must Be Nice" – 1:45
3. "Cayce" – 1:25
4. "Can't Get Around It" – 1:06
5. "Quietly" – 2:42
6. "Symptom" – 1:44
7. "The Method" – 2:30
8. "Outgroup" (Major Conflict) – 2:34
9. "Sidelined" – 2:33
10. "And I..." – 1:39
11. "Personal Hardcore" – 1:15
12. "Occupied" – 0:58
13. "Junkdrawer" – 2:41
14. "Scared" – 2:31
15. "Happy Hour" – 2:43
16. "Another Day" – 2:51
17. "Pokerface" – 1:58
18. "Are You Comfortable?" – 2:07

== Credits ==
- Anthony Comunale – vocals
- Carl Porcaro – guitar
- Rich McLoughlin – guitar
- Sean O'Brien – bass
- Anthony Drago – drums
- Recorded June – August, 1996 at LoHo Studio, New York City, USA
- Produced by Dean Rispler and Killing Time
- Engineered by Joe Hogan
- Mixed by Victor Luke
- Cover painting by Chris Cannon
