= Requiem (Verdena album) =

Studio album by Verdena
- Released: March 16, 2007
- Genre: Alternative rock: grunge; stoner rock; neo-psychedelia; psychedelic rock; space rock
- Length: 62:13
- Label: Black Out; Universal
- Producer: Alberto Ferrari

Verdena chronology
Il Suicidio dei Samurai (2004)	Requiem (2007)	Wow (2011)

Requiem is the fourth album by the Italian alternative-rock band Verdena, released in 2007. It was published not only in Italy but also abroad: the same day in Switzerland, Germany and Austria on April 13 and April 16 in France.

== Track list ==
1. Marti in the sky – 0:23
2. Don Calisto – 3:02
3. Non prendere l'acme, Eugenio – 6:05
4. Angie – 3:44
5. Aha – 1:06
6. Isacco nucleare – 4:18
7. Caños – 3:43
8. Il Gulliver – 11:54
9. Faro – 0:47
10. Muori Delay – 2:42
11. Trovami un modo semplice per uscirne – 3:34
12. Opanopono – 1:50
13. Il caos strisciante – 4:35
14. Was? – 2:06
15. Sotto prescrizione del dott. Huxley – 12:35
16. Non è (only in the vinyl press)
