= The Contract (EP) =

EP by Crime In Stereo
- Released: July 7, 2005
- Genre: Hardcore punk
- Length: 9:02
- Label: Blackout Records
- Producer: Mike Sapone

Crime In Stereo chronology
Explosives and the Will to Use Them (2004)	The Contract (2005)	The Troubled Stateside (2006)

The Contract is a four track EP from Long Island punk band, Crime In Stereo. It was released in July, 2005 on Blackout Records and was their final recording for the label before a move to Nitro Records. All of the songs on The Contract were re-released recently on the Love 7" with a bonus track.

== Track listing ==
- All songs written by Crime In Stereo
1. "New Harlem Shuffle" – 2:15
2. "Long Song Titles Aren't Cool Anymore Because the Rest of You Fuckers are No Good at It" – 0:32
3. "Jesus is My Ride Home" – 2:37
4. "Sleeping Androids Do Dream Electric Sheep" – 3:38
5. "The Return Of..." – 2:32 (bonus track on the Love 7")

== Credits ==
- Kristian Hallbert – vocals
- Alex Dunne – guitar
- Shawn Gardiner – guitar
- Mike Musilli – bass
- Scotty Giffin – drums
- Produced by Mike Sapone
