= Avenue X =

Avenue X may refer to:

- Avenue X, an album by The Turbo A.C.'s
- Avenue X (street), a street in Brooklyn
- Avenue X (IND Culver Line), a station on the IND Culver Line of the New York City Subway
