= Verdena (album) =

Studio album by Verdena
- Released: September 24, 1999
- Genre: Alternative rock: grunge
- Length: 48:48
- Label: Black Out; Universal
- Producer: Francesca Carpanelli; Giorgio Canali

Verdena chronology
Verdena (demotape) (1997)	Verdena (1999)	Solo un Grande Sasso (2001)

Verdena is the self-titled debut album by the Italian band Verdena, released on September 24, 1999.

== Track listing ==
1. Ovunque (3.06)
2. Valvonauta (4.23)
3. Pixel (4.23)
4. L'infinita gioia di Henry Bahus (4.30)
5. Vera (2.41)
6. Dentro Sharon (3.33)
7. Caramel pop (4.08)
8. Viba (3.47)
9. Ultranoia (4.55)
10. Zoe (3.26)
11. Bambina in nero (2.56)
12. Eyeliner (6.52)
13. Ormogenia (3.01) (only in LP press)
