= Each Breath Haunted =

Studio album by The Banner
- Released: August 16, 2005
- Recorded: April – May, 2005; Trax East, S River, New Jersey, U.S.
- Genre: Hardcore punk
- Length: 42:32
- Label: Ferret Music
- Producer: Eric Rachel

The Banner chronology
Your Murder Mixtape (2003)	Each Breath Haunted (2005)	Frailty (2008)

Professional ratings
Review scores
Source	Rating
Punknews	3.5/5 stars
Allmusic	4/5 stars

Each Breath Haunted is the second full-length album from New Jersey, U.S. hardcore punk band, The Banner. It was released in August, 2005 on the Ferret Music record label. It follows their late 2003 release of Your Murder Mixtape and the EP, Posthumous. This album's sound is heavily influenced by The Misfits. In addition, the horrorcore imagery prevalent in all their works continues on this album, this time taking a more gothic horror direction with lyrics about mythical subjects such as werewolves, vampires, and other hell-beasts. The cover was created by the vocalist, Joey Southside, a professional dark comic cartoonist.

Each Breath Haunted was pressed on 12" vinyl for the first time in March 2012. .

== Overview ==
By this time, and with input from experienced sources, the band's songwriting had developed sufficiently to carry the themes they portray. The end result being that the music is more refined, still brutal, but with many softer, reflective mood parts – "Interlude" and "I Am Legend" as examples. The music in general involves more technical, angular riffs which are not out of place or carried out ineffectively, bringing about a comparison to early dark and moody Danzig. It is only near the end, on "Coffin Nails", that they tip a nod to their traditional hardcore punk roots. Joey Southside again changes vocal style; from traditional hardcore on the EP, to metalcore on Your Murder Mixtape, to this time a darker tone – more in keeping with the style of music they chose to play at this time.

== Track listing ==
- All tracks written by The Banner
1. "Devilhawks" – 3:21
2. "Venom and Hope" – 2:19
3. "I'll Be Happy When You're Fucking Dead" – 1:25
4. "An Allergy to the Sun" – 3:26
5. "Sovereign of the Black Pit" – 2:29
6. "Black Hood" – 3:28
7. "An Allergy to Silver" – 2:49
8. "Hell on a Horse" – 5:32
9. "Interlude" – 3:37
10. "Muddweller" – 4:07
11. "Coffin Nails" – 1:48
12. "Tragedy" – 1:35
13. "I Am Legend" – 6:38

== Credits ==
- Joey Southside – vocals
- Garrett Defalco – guitar
- Chris LeBoeuf – guitar
- Ian Mullen – drums and bass
- Mike LeBoeuf is credited on the record playing drums but came into the band after recording the album.
- Erik Tyrant, Carl Severson and Josh Kisskiss – guest vocals
- Recorded April – May, 2005 at Trax East, South River, New Jersey, USA
- Produced, mixed and engineered by Eric Rachel
- Assisted by Eric Kvortek and Kyle Rado
- Mastered by Alan Douches at West West Side Studios
- Artwork and design by Joey Southside
