= Explosives and the Will to Use Them =

Studio album by Crime In Stereo
- Released: January 4, 2004
- Recorded: Water Music Recorders, Hoboken, New Jersey, US
- Genre: Hardcore punk
- Length: 28:30
- Label: Blackout
- Producer: Ted Young, Crime In Stereo

Crime In Stereo chronology
| Split w/Kill Your Idols (2003) | Explosives and the Will to Use Them (2004) | The Contract (EP) (2005) |

Professional ratings
Review scores
| Source | Rating |
|---|---|
| Allmusic | 3.5/5 stars |

Explosives and the Will to Use Them is the debut full-length studio album from Long Island punk band, Crime In Stereo. It was released in January, 2004 on Blackout Records.

== Track listing ==
- All songs written by Crime In Stereo
1. "Amsterdamned!" – 2:06
2. "Warning: Perfect Sideburns Do Not Make You Dangerous" – 2:32
3. "Play It Loud Fuckers" – 2:55
4. "What a Strange Turn of Events" – 2:11
5. "Compass and Square" – 2:03
6. "If You Think Were Talking About You, We Are" – 2:03
7. "Barfight on Bedford Ave" – 1:51
8. "It Ain't All Hugs and Handshakes" – 2:29
9. "Here's to Things Gone Wrong" – 2:57
10. "No Gold Stars for Nationalism" – 1:03
11. "Terribly Softly" – 2:01
12. "Arson at 563" – 4:19

== Credits ==
- Kristian Hallbert – vocals
- Alex Dunne – guitar
- Shawn Gardiner – guitar
- Mike Musilli – bass
- Scotty Giffin – drums
- Recorded at Water Music Recorders, Hoboken, New Jersey, US
- Produced by Ted Young and Crime In Stereo
- Engineered by Ted Young and John Bender
- Mixed by Arik Victor
- Mastered by Alan Douches
