= Il Suicidio dei Samurai =

Studio album by Verdena
- Released: February 10, 2004
- Genre: Alternative rock: grunge; neo-psychedelia
- Length: 49:10
- Label: Blackout; Universal
- Producer: Alberto Ferrari

Verdena chronology
Solo un Grande Sasso (2002)	Il Suicidio dei Samurai (2004)	Requiem (2007)

Il Suicidio dei Samurai is the third album by the Italian alternative-rock band Verdena, released in 2004.

== Track list ==
1. Logorrea (esperti all'opera) – 3:54
2. Luna – 3:32
3. Mina – 4:27
4. Balanite – 4:47
5. Phantastica – 4:01
6. Elefante – 3:06
7. Glamodrama – 6:27
8. Far fisa – 4:23
9. 17 tir nel cortile – 5:10
10. 40 secondi di niente – 4:45
11. Il suicidio del samurai – 4:28
