= Stuck in a Rut =

To be stuck in a rut is to be metaphorically trapped in a fixed pattern or routine.

Stuck in a Rut can also refer to:

== Songs ==
- "Stuck in a Rut" by Against All Authority, from their 2000 album 24 Hour Roadside Resistance
- "Stuck in a Rut" by CJ Baran
- "Stuck in a Rut" by BodyRockers, from their 2005 album BodyRockers
- "Stuck in a Rut" by the Bottle Rockets, from their 1994 album The Brooklyn Side
- "Stuck in a Rut" by Burn Halo, from their 2011 album Up from the Ashes
- "Stuck in a Rut" by The Darkness, from their 2003 album Permission to Land
- "Stuck in a Rut" by Hogan's Heroes, from their 1988 album Built to Last
- "Stuck in a Rut" by Kill Your Idols, from their 2005 album From Companionship to Competition
- "Stuck in a Rut" by Stereophonics, from their 2009 album Keep Calm and Carry On
- "Stuck in a Rut" by Taxi Violence, from their 2014 album Tenfold

== Other ==
- Stuck in a Rut, a 1999 book by cartoonist Jamie Smith
