= Brightside (Killing Time album) =

Studio album by Killing Time
- Released: November 1989
- Studios: Normandy Sound, Warren, Rhode Island, U.S.
- Genres: Hardcore punk; crossover thrash
- Length: 23:11 w/o bonus
- Labels: In Effect; Victory Records (1995); Lost & Found (1995)
- Producers: Killing Time; Tom Soares

Killing Time chronology
| Brightside (1989) | Happy Hour (1992) |

Professional ratings
Review scores
| Source | Rating |
|---|---|
| AllMusic | link |

Brightside was the first of three full-length albums by New York hardcore band Killing Time. It was originally released in November 1989 on In Effect Records, a division of Relativity Records, and subsequently re-released in 1995 by Lost & Found Records in Europe, and Victory Records in the U.S. – both with bonus tracks. Both re-issue versions have three tracks from the Happy Hour EP (1992). Additionally, the Victory Records re-issue includes material from Raw Deal's 1988 demo, five tracks from which were re-recorded for Brightside.

Before adopting the name Killing Time, the band was known as Raw Deal. A threatened lawsuit by another band with the same name forced them to change their name just as they were entering the studio to record this release. Their guitarist, Mike Sentkiewitz, left the band prior to recording to pursue a different musical direction. Many of the songs he helped pen, however, are included on this album. Shortly after the album was released, the band went into their first hiatus and did not return to the studio until 1992 for the Happy Hour EP. Their next full-length album did not come until 1997, with The Method.

== Track listing ==
1. "Cheap Thrills" (Anthony Comunale, Mike Sentkiewitz) – 1:06
2. "Brightside" (Anthony Drago, Carl Porcaro, Sentkiewitz, Rich McLoughlin) – 2:29
3. "Fools Die" (Drago, Porcaro) – 2:19
4. "Tell Tale" (Drago, Porcaro, McLoughlin) – 1:29
5. "What I Want" (Drago, Porcaro) – 2:11
6. "No More Mr. Nice Guy" (Drago, Porcaro, McLoughlin) – 2:44
7. "My Reason" (Sentkiewitz) – 2:13
8. "New Release" (Comunale, Porcaro, McLoughlin) – 1:42
9. "Backtrack" (Drago, Porcaro, Sentkiewitz) – 2:36
10. "Wall of Hate" (Drago, Porcaro) – 1:28
11. "Wisdom" (Drago, Porcaro, McLoughlin) – 2:54
- The Lost & Found, and Victory Records 1995 reissues had the following bonus tracks, originally on the Happy Hour EP
  - "Happy Hour" – 3:12
  - "Going Somewhere" – 2:17
  - "Whole Lotta Nuthin'" – 3:58
- The Victory Records version also has the following tracks, from the original Raw Deal demo of 1988
  - "Wall of Hate"
  - "Tell Tale"
  - "New Release"
  - "Only the Strong Survive"
  - "My Reason"
  - "No More Mr. Nice Guy"
  - "The Lines Are Drawn"

== Credits ==
- Anthony Comunale – vocals
- Carl Porcaro – guitar
- Rich McLoughlin – bass
- Anthony Drago – drums
- Recorded and mixed at Normandy Sound, Warren, Rhode Island
- Produced by Killing Time and Tom Soares
- Engineered and mixed by Tom Soares
- Assistant engineered by Joe Pires and Jamie Locke
- Cover art and logo by John Drago, Anthony's brother

== External links and sources ==
- Killing Time official website
- Blackout Records band page
- Blackout Records Happy Hour EP page
