= The Procedure =

American band

- Origin: Trenton, New Jersey
- Genres: Hardcore/Post Hardcore
- Years active: 2001–Present
- Members: Mike Donatelli — drums Frank Fenimore — guitar Bill Henderson — guitar, vocals Jon Tarella — bass Jesse Traynor — vocals
- Past members: Ed Adams — bass Justin Shepp — bass Joe Hatrak — drums

The Procedure is a New Jersey band that formed in 2001. The band features former Thursday and Purpose guitarist Bill Henderson.

== History ==
The Procedure formed in 2001 at The College of New Jersey in Trenton, NJ. The band self-released a 4-song demo in 2002 and began performing in and around New Jersey. In early 2003 they released a 7" on Warmachine Records before signing to Brightside/Blackout! Records that spring and releasing their first full length, Rise of New Reason in September 2003. They temporarily disbanded in 2004 after the departure of drummer Mike Donatelli, but he returned to the band the next year and they resumed working on their second LP, Shift Pacific. In 2008, they recorded their third full length, The Ancestor's Tale, which was released on February 26, 2009 on the band's own Eyeset World Records.

== Members ==
- Mike Donatelli - drums
- Frank Fenimore - Guitar
- Bill Henderson - Guitar, vocals
- Jon “Big Daddy” Tarella - Bass 2008–Present
- Ed Adams - Bass 2001–2007
- Jesse Traynor - vocals

== Discography & album descriptions ==
Album information
2002 Demo
- Released: 2002
- Four song self-released CDr
For Janus
- Released: 2003
- Four song 7" on Warmachine Records.
Rise of New Reason
- Released: 2003
- Their first full-length album. Release on Brightside/Blackout! Records.
2001-2004
- Released: 2004
- 6 song EP. Self-Released, handed out on tour. Features cover songs.
Shift Pacific
- Released: 2005
- Their second full-length album. Released on Eyeset World Records.
The Ancestor's Tale
- Released: 2009
- Their third full-length album. Released on Eyeset World Records.
