= The Banner (band) =

American hardcore punk band

- Origin: Bloomfield, New Jersey, U.S.
- Genres: Hardcore punk
- Years active: 1999–present
- Labels: Ferret; Melotov; Blackout!; Good Fight
- Members: Joey Southside; Garrett DeFalco; Jake Blochinger; Pete August; Christian Castan

The Banner is an American hardcore punk band from Bloomfield, New Jersey.

The Banner broke up for a brief period in 2006 before reuniting with founding member Garrett DeFalco. The band released their third studio album, Frailty, in 2008, which was written, recorded and produced at the Machine Shop studio in Hoboken, New Jersey, by Joey and Will Putney and released on the Ferret Music label.

In late 2011, Born to Ruin was announced as the band's next release, written by Joey and Jeremy Comitas to be released by American label Melotov Records. The four songs comprising Born to Ruin: The Way Is Shut released in the fall of 2013.

The band released their fourth album, Greying, in 2014 and Only the Dead Know Jersey, a split with Old Wounds, in 2015. Both were released via Good Fight Music.

== Members ==
=== Current members ===
- Joey "JSS" Stone^{†} – vocals
- Paul Klein (Suburban Scum, Gotham Road) – drums
- Pete August (Fleshtemple, Ankle Monitor, No) – bass
- Cindy Ward (Ankle Monitor, Tru) – guitar
- Benny 2 Bars (Ankle Monitor, No) – guitar
- Rich Bukowski (Pharoah, Devoidov) – guitar

=== Former members ===
- Garrett DeFalco^{†} – guitar
- Jake Blochinger – drums
- Joe Cantamessa (IATT) – guitar
- Paul Klein (Suburban Scum, Gotham Road) – drums
- Buzz Luciano (Pellinore) – guitar
- Jeremy Comitas (Bayonet, Senses Fail) – guitar
- Rich Bukowski (Pharaoh) – guitar
- Kevin Manion (Pregnant)^{†} – guitar
- Jon Morozowski^{†} – bass
- Dustin Blevins – guitar
- Justin Fullam (Killed by The Bull, Judas Factor) – guitar
- Chris LeBoeuf (Hoover Flags, Mixtape, Father Divine) – guitar
- Mike LeBoeuf (This Charming Man) – drums
- Chris "Fingaz" Larsen (Suburban Scum, Banquets) – bass
- Ian Mullen (The Violent Hearts, The Sun The Moon The Stars) – drums/bass
- Paul Jaffre^{†} (Shady View Terrace, The Hostage, Monument) – drums
- Mikey Bats (Lager) – guitar
- Rosey (hell mary) – guitar
- Steve "Tree" tanis (NJDots, Low road) – bass

† Founding members of The Banner

== Discography ==
=== Studio albums ===
Release date	Title	Record label
December 16, 2003	Your Murder Mixtape	Blackout Records
Summer 2004	Reflection in the Shadow of the Beast (unreleased)	Blackout Records
August 16, 2005	Each Breath Haunted	Ferret Music
July 10, 2008	Frailty	Ferret Music
December 9, 2014	Greying	Good Fight Music

=== EPs ===
Release date	Title	Record label
July 2003	Posthumous	Blackout Records
February 2004	Dead Wrong vs. the Banner (split with Dead Wrong)	Warmachine Records
November 2013	Born to Ruin I: The Way Is Shut	Melotov Records
July 2015	Only the Dead Know Jersey (split with Old Wounds)	Good Fight Music

== Videography ==
- Venom and Hope
- Rattlesnakes
- Send Me Down
