= Killing Time (American band) =

New York hardcore band

- Also known as: Raw Deal (1988–1989)
- Origin: New York City, U.S.
- Genres: Hardcore punk, tough guy hardcore
- Years active: 1988–1998, 2005–2011, 2023
- Labels: In Effect Records; Lost & Found (reissue); Victory Records (reissue); Blackout Records; Triple B Records
- Spinoff of: Breakdown
- Members: Anthony Comunale; Anthony Drago; Christopher Skowronski; Carl Porcaro
- Past members: Sean O'Brien; Dave Franklin; Alex Gopian; Mike Sentkiewitz; Lars Weiss; Rich McLoughlin (deceased)
- Website: killingtimenyhc.com

Killing Time is a New York hardcore band. From their beginnings in 1988, under the name Raw Deal, they went on to record two full-length albums and several EPs, singles, and compilation tracks. The band went through three hiatuses before formally disbanding in 1998. However, the band re-formed in 2006 and has been touring/playing since. Work on their third full-length album was completed in March 2009.

== History ==
=== Early days as Raw Deal (1989–1990) ===
Raw Deal was formed in 1988 by Carl Porcaro, Rich McLoughlin and Anthony Drago after they split from their former band, Breakdown. Anthony Comunale (ex-Token Entry) was recruited on vocals and Mike Sentkiewitz (ex-Sick of It All) on guitar to round out the Raw Deal lineup.

The band soon recorded a demo cassette and began playing at various venues in New York City, most notably at CBGB's which was home to many hardcore punk acts at the time. Following a show at The Ritz, they were signed by In Effect Records with an opportunity to record their first full-length album.

Mike Sentkiewitz left the band and they were forced to change their name to Killing Time after legal action was threatened by a heavy metal band of the same name. The band entered the Normandy Sound studio in Warren, Rhode Island, with hardcore producer Tom Soares, who had previously been involved with recording Cro-Mags' Best Wishes and Gang Green's Older... Budweiser. The band performed as a four-piece and re-recorded some of the tracks from their first demo and some new material which resulted in the Brightside album being released in November 1989. In the same year, Blackout Records released a New York hardcore compilation, Where the Wild Things Are, which contained two of Killing Time's tracks – "Backtrack" and "Brightside".

=== As Killing Time (1989–1994) ===
After the album was released, Rich McLoughlin expressed a desire to switch from bass to guitar but the rest of the band rejected the move. McLoughlin left and was replaced by ex-Inside Out bassist Alex Gopian. The band played a show in California (their first and last show on the west coast of the US), which spawned the 7" single "East Meets West" which included the Killing Time track "Wall of Hate" and tracks by Sick of It All, Vision, Carry Nation and Point Blank. However, for most of this period, the band was considered to be in hiatus as they neither recorded nor toured.

In late 1991, Rich McLoughlin rejoined the band as a second guitarist and the band entered the studio to record an EP, entitled Happy Hour. It contained four tracks and was released in July 1992 on Blackout Records. It was also released in Europe on Semaphore Records as a 12", complete with previously unreleased demo material which the band had recorded before signing with In Effect.

In 1992, a combination of a negative reception to Happy Hour and general problems of violence in the New York hardcore scene resulted in the band taking a hiatus. Joey I, roadie and author of the biography on the band's official website, explained, "...the Hardcore scene itself was changing – becoming more violent and the music becoming secondary to the socializing and posing, they decided to call it quits". The band members joined or formed other bands; Porcaro and McLoughlin started the Rope-A-Dope record label, while Gopian joined the hip-hop group Justice System. Drago became a police officer in White Plains, New York, and Comunale became involved in the financial sector.

The band reformed briefly in 1994 for a European tour. However, Comunale was unable to resume duties due to job commitments and Gopian's Justice System had signed to MCA Records. They were replaced by Dave Franklin of the New Jersey hardcore band Vision on vocals and ex-Judge and Uppercut guitarist Lars Weiss on bass.

In 1994 the band's unfamiliar lineup and general appearance caused mixed reviews from the European music press, causing the band again to go on hiatus.

=== Post-hiatus and breakup (1995–1998) ===
In 1995 there was an upturn in the market for hardcore punk. It was not just on the east coast, with Blackout Records leading the way with the New York hardcore and neighboring New Jersey releases – re-issuing a lot of 1980s hardcore and eventually launching the recording careers of bands like H_{2}O – but also the west coast with labels such as Indecision Records and Nitro Records springing up. Victory Records were also prolific releasers of punk from their Chicago home in the mid-eastern states.

Comunale returned to the Killing Time fold and Sean O'Brien was added on bass. In March 1995, the band entered the studio and released the Unavoidable EP on Blackout Records. They also recorded a cover version of the Sex Pistols song "Bodies", which appeared on the compilation Punk Rock Jukebox. In addition, Brightside was re-released simultaneously in the US and Europe. The new EP was generally well received and seen as a return from the experimentations which had taken place in the Happy Hour era.

In June 1996, the band entered the LoHo Studio in New York City and emerged in August having recorded their second album, The Method. It was released in April 1997 and marked a return to the harder sound created on the Brightside album, but also a more melodic and intricate element with the addition of short guitar solos.

In spite of the success of The Method and the re-emergence of second-wave New York hardcore bands into the third wave of late-1990s hardcore – even first wave veterans Agnostic Front were tempted back to the studio – the band played its last show in Newburgh, New York, in 1997 and finally brought the band to a rest in 1998.

=== Reformation (2005–present) ===
In May 2005, the band played two reunion dates at Northsix in Brooklyn, New York City, on a bill that included The Slumlords, which included the ex-singer of Breakdown. The band was scheduled to play later in 2005 at Posi-Numbers Festival in July, headlining the third and last day of the fest. However, they never ended up playing due to the event being shut down only hours before they were scheduled to play due to a fight. The band was also scheduled to play at the Hellfest in New Jersey in August 2005 before the event was canceled indefinitely.

Early in the summer of 2006, the band tapped old friend and Uppercut guitarist Chris Skowronski to play bass and did some New York-area shows before leaving for a European tour in the fall. They returned, played a few local shows and set out for their first tour of Asia in November 2007, playing two weeks in Japan and South Korea.

In the winter of 2008, inspired by the overwhelming response during the Asian tour, the band discussed writing their first new material since 1996, using Drago's parents' garage as a studio.

In the spring of 2009, the band finalized the 12 songs that would become Killing Time's third LP and first studio effort in over ten years. Recorded in July 2009 at Electroluxe Studios in Brooklyn, "Three Steps Back", released on Dead City Records, the band drew on their various influences and musicianship to craft 12 news songs that bring New York hardcore back to its punk roots while still offering up that classic Killing Time crunch and power.

In 2003, Carl Porcaro contributed some additional guitar work on a cover version of "Tell Tale" by New Jersey hardcore band Ensign on their album Love the Music, Hate the Kids.

== Members ==
- Anthony Comunale - vocals (1988-1992, 1995-1998, 2005-present)
- Carl Porcaro - guitar (1988-1992, 1994, 1995-1998, 2005-present)
- Anthony Drago - drums (1988-1992, 1994, 1995-1998, 2005-present)
- Christopher Skowronski - bass (2006-present)

=== Previous members ===
- Rich McLoughlin - bass (1988-1990), guitar (1991-1992, 1994-1998, 2005-2020; died 2020)
- Mike Sentkiewitz - guitar (1988-1989)
- Sean O'Brien - bass (1995-1998, 2005-2006)
- Alex Gopian - bass (1990-1992)
- Dave Franklin - vocals (1994)
- Lars Weiss - bass (1994)

Timeline

== Discography ==
=== Albums/EPs ===
- Brightside (November 1989) In Effect Records
- Happy Hour EP (July 1992) Blackout Records
- Unavoidable EP (March 1995) Blackout Records
- The Method (April 1997) Blackout Records
- Raw Deal demo EP (May 2005) Dead Serious Records
- Three Steps Back (February 2010) Dead City Records

=== Singles ===
- East Meets West 7" (1991) Nemesis Records – "Wall of Hate" in California, USA
- Killing Time/Profound Effect 7" (?) ? – split, contains "Fools Die"

=== Compilations ===
- Where the Wild Things Are (1989) Blackout Records – "Backtrack" and "Brightside"
- Punk Rock Jukebox (1995) Blackout Records – Sex Pistols's "Bodies"
- Satisfaction Guaranteed Nawpost Records – Major Conflict's "Outgroup"
- Creepy Crawl (1997) Another Planet – "Fools Die" live

=== Reissues ===
- Happy Hour 12" EP (1992) Blackout/Semaphore Records – European import contains second Raw Deal demo
- Brightside (1995) Lost & Found – contains Happy Hour EP
- Brightside (1995) Victory Records – contains Happy Hour EP and 1st Raw Deal demo
