= Austin Stone Worship =

American worship music collective

- Also known as: Austin Stone
- Origin: Austin, Texas
- Genres: Worship, CCM
- Years active: 2002–present
- Members: Jimmy McNeal; Matt Graham; Dietrich Schmidt
- Past members: Chris Tomlin; Aaron Ivey; Logan Walter; Justin Cofield; Brett Land; Jimmie Ingram; Kyle Lent
- Website: austinstoneworship.com

Austin Stone Worship is an American contemporary worship music collective from Austin, Texas, founded in part by Chris Tomlin, as a part of Austin Stone Community Church. The band started making music in 2002, while they have since released six albums, and four of those charted on the Billboard magazine charts.

== Background ==
Formed in 2002 in Austin, Texas, with Chris Tomlin, being one of their originating members, and they now count as their members the following: Jimmy McNeal, Matt Graham, Dietrich Schmidt.

== Music history ==
The worship collective have released six albums, and four of those charted on the Billboard magazine charts. Their albums are the following: Austin Stone Live in 2011, A Day of Glory in 2012, The Reveille Volume 1 in 2013, King of Love in 2013, The Reveille Volume II in 2014, and This Glorious Grace in 2015.

== Members ==
Current members

- Jimmy McNeal
- Jarryd Foreman
- Matt Graham
- Dietrich Schmidt

Former members

- Chris Tomlin
- Aaron Ivey

On February 11, 2024, Austin Stone announced it had fired its worship pastor, Aaron Ivey on February 5, “stating that he showcased a 'pattern of predatory manipulation, sexual exploitation, and abuse of influence,' including with a minor in 2011 and with three men since then.” As a result, they have removed most of their music resources of their worship albums that they have released on streaming platforms, leaving most of their previous albums as EPs.

== Discography ==
List of albums, with selected chart positions
Title	Album details	Peak chart positions		
Title	Album details	US Chr	US Indie	US Heat
Austin Stone Live	Released: December 6, 2011; Label: Austin Stone Worship; CD, digital download	34	–	6
A Day of Glory	Released: November 13, 2012; Label: Austin Stone Worship; CD, digital download	–	–	14
The Reveille Volume 1	Released: January 8, 2013; Label: Austin Stone Worship; CD, digital download	–	–	–
King of Love	Released: October 22, 2013; Label: Austin Stone Worship; CD, digital download	15	43	9
The Reveille Volume II	Released: November 4, 2014; Label: Austin Stone Worship; CD, digital download	–	–	–
This Glorious Grace	Released: October 16, 2015; Label: Austin Stone Worship; CD, digital download	12	30	4
EVERFLOW	Released: November 17, 2017; Label: Austin Stone Worship; CD, digital download	–	–	–
The Reveille, Vol.III	Released: November 2, 2017; Label: Austin Stone Worship; CD, digital download	–	–	–
Dentro	Released: September 2, 2020; Label: Austin Stone Worship; digital download	–	–	–
With/In	Released: September 4, 2020; Label: Austin Stone Worship; digital download	–	–	–
