= Verdena =

Italian rock band

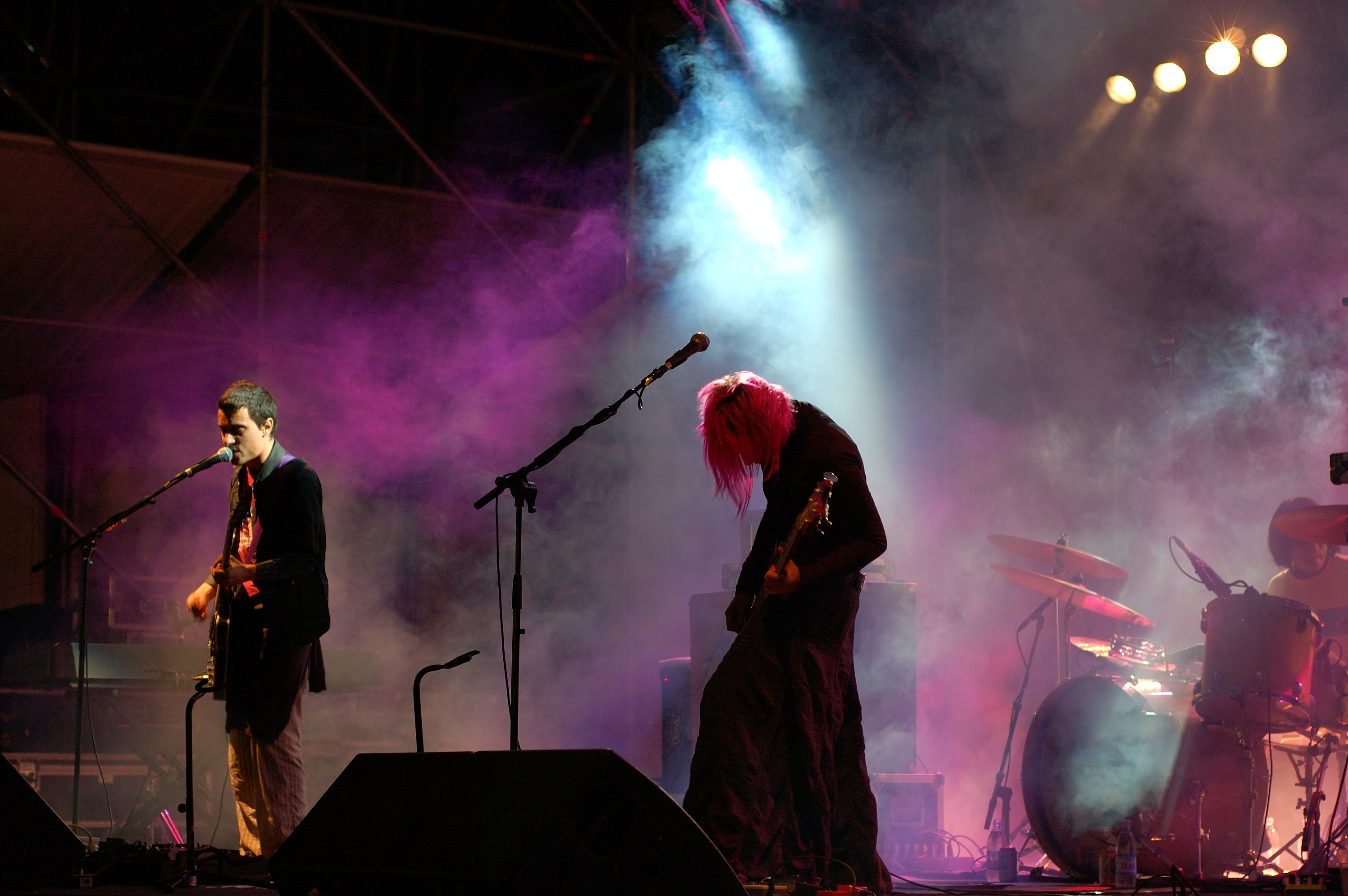
- Verdena live in Modena

Background information
- Origin: Albino, Bergamo, Lombardy, Italy
- Genres: Alternative rock; grunge; psychedelia; stoner rock; experimental
- Years active: 1995 – present
- Label: Universal
- Members: Alberto Ferrari [lead vocals and guitar (1995-present), piano and keyboards (2000-present), bass (2023-)] Luca Ferrari [drums and percussion (1995-present), synth (2000-)]
- Past members: Fidel Figaroli [piano and keyboards (2002-2006)] Roberta Sammarelli [bass and vocals (1996-2023), keyboards (2000-2023)]
- Website: www.verdena.com

Verdena are an Italian rock band originating in Albino, Bergamo. They have released seven full-length albums under Universal Music Group.

== History ==
=== Origins ===
The group formed in 1995 with the two brothers Alberto (guitarist) and Luca Ferrari (drummer).

In 1996, after various bass players coming and going, met Roberta Sammarelli (bassist), who at the time was playing guitar for a female punk group in Bergamo, the Porno Nuns, who Alberto knew for some time. The same year, they recorded and released their first demo Froll sound, with lyrics almost entirely in English with influences by Nirvana. The group initially decided to call themselves "Verbena," the name of a plant (Alberto yells it in Nella schiuma, a song from their second demo tape), but changed to Verdena after finding out a group in the United States already had that name. The band was often called the "Italian Nirvana," which continues to be given to them to this day.

In July 1997, the trio recorded the second and last demotape, this time with lyrics entirely in Italian, and appeared in the compilation Soniche Avventure by Fridge Records with the song Fiato adolescenziale. Between 1997 and 1998, they were playing live in the cities of Bergamo, Brescia, Milan and Savona.

The band was offered to sign with various different independent labels, but would accept to be signed by Black Out / Universal in September 1998, after being discovered by Luca Fantacone.

=== First album and success ===
In March 1999, they started work on their debut album Verdena at Studio Emme in Florence. The album sold more than 40,000 copies and was awarded the Repubblica "PIM Award" under "Best revelation group of 1999." The album was produced under Giorgio Canali (ex-guitarist of CCCP Fedeli alla linea, at the time a member of the CSI), and finished the album in around a month.

Their first single, Valvonauta, was released on 21 June and had a music video directed by Franceso Fei. It received significant airtime on MTV and other music stations, and became a success in the Italian indie rock scene. On 20 September the album went on sale in stores and on 18 October the band began their tour in Italy. Other singles from the album include Viba, Stenuo, Cretina, and Sunshine of Your Love (cover by Cream).

In February 2000, the band released a vinyl version of the album with an exclusive song, Ormogenia, sung by bassist Roberta Sammarelli. The band tried new ideas, such as layering their sound and adding in a rhodes piano and a mellotron.

=== Solo un grande sasso and Il suicidio dei samurai ===
On 15 June 2001 the Spaceman EP was released, containing three unreleased songs including Reverberation, a cover of the 13th Floor Elevators. The EP anticipated the release of the band's second album, Solo un grande sasso, the culmination of two months worth of recording in Mauro Pagani's Studio Next with the production of Afterhours frontman Manuel Agnelli. The album received widespread acclaim from music critics and ranked sixth in the FIMI charts.

The band started the Solo un grande sasso tour from 26 October 2001 to the rest of 2002, with dates throughout Italy and two Dutch festivals. During this time, pianist/keyboardest Diego Maggi joined and left, and then keyboardist Fidel Fogaroli joined the group as well. As with the first album, Solo un grande sasso was later put onto vinyl with a song not included on the CD, called Il Tramonto degli stupidi.

In 2003, Verdena recorded three covers (Search & Destroy by Metallica, TV Eye by the Stooges and Across the Universe by the Beatles) with Manuel Agnelli. In the summer of the same year, the group began recording their third album, Il suicidio dei samurai. The album was released at the beginning of 2004 alongside the EP Luna EP. As with Solo un grande sasso, critics acclaimed the album. Alberto used the adjective "rude" to describe Il suicidio dei samurai, and "cosmic" for Solo un grande sasso. That year held a long tour with more than 90 dates starting on 21 February and ending on 26 December. In the first days of February, the band played a small taste of the newest album in three concerts.

On 18 April 2005 Il suicidio dei samurai entered first place of the Italian top ten and was published in Switzerland, and later in Germany on 12 September. Verdena had a promotional tour in some German and Swiss cities to celebrate the release. In April 2006, Il suicidio dei samurai was released under the prestigious French label Barclay in its original version. The album released in French stores on 10 April 2006.

After a tour abroad and a special appearance in Italy at Arezzo Wave, the band went back to recording. The band began the first phase of writing the fourth album in their Henhouse Studio in December 2005.

=== Requiem ===
After several months spent in the studio recording, their fourth album, Requiem, was released on 16 March 2007. It held fifteen tracks ranging styles from hard rock to 90s grunge, with strong psychedelic influences from the 70s and from stoner rock. The album was supplemented by an Italian tour. Along with the release of the album, Fogaroli announced he would no longer be part of the group; however he still collaborated with the group on Il gulliver (Rhodes piano) and Was? (Rhodes piano and djembe).

Requiem was also released in Germany, Switzerland, Austria and France, and eventually also Spain. On 29 June 2007 the Caños EP was released. It contained, in addition to the eponymous song, had four unreleased songs (Malaga, L'ora è buia, Parabellum and Fluido) as well as a cover by Elvis Presley, "(Marie's the Name) His Latest Flame". The EP marked a change in direction for Verdena's sound: electronic influences started to take over most of the album, as demonstrated by Parabellum, where a musical track by Stafano Facchielli (also known as D.RaD, and the electronic section of Almamegretta) is reworked.

=== Post-Requiem Tour ===
In September 2008, Alberto and Luca started the Betoschi project with drummer Paolo Serra and other friends, releasing the album 83705CH1, with live shows in October 2009.

In November 2009, the duo Marco Fasolo-Liviano Mos of Jennifer Gentle joined for some live dates with Verdena, with Alberto on bass and Luca on drums.

=== WOW, Radar and EPs ===
Wow was released on 18 January 2011. The double album features 27 tracks, most of them played with piano. Singles from this latest album include "Razzi Arpia Inferno e Fiamme", "Scegli Me (Un Mondo Che Tu Non Vuoi)" and "Miglioramento".

=== Post-Wow Tour ===
On 14 March 2012 the band presented a biography of the group, written by Emliano Colasanti, titled Un mondo del tutto differente: La storia di Wow e dei Verdena (A totally different world: The story of Wow and of Verdena), alongside an exhibit by Luca at the Bloom di Mezzago titled Immagini per forza (Images for strength).

In July 2012, they were the opening band for the Flaming Lips for their two Italian dates in Padua on the 10th and in Turin on the 11th. The group was working on Endkadenz at the same time.

In September 2012, the group recorded a cover of the song Moby Dick and provided pieces to be broadcast by the same name by Rai Radio 2.

In the summer and autumn of 2012, the duo Marco Fasolo-Lviano Mos dei Jennifer Gentle joined Alberto (on bass) and Luca (on drums) for twelve concerts.

On 29 May 2013 Verdena announced they had entered the studio to record a new album, and on 20 November 2014 they confirmed they had finished recording.

=== Endkadenz ===
On 18 December 2014 Verdena announced the release of two volumes of their latest efforts. On 27 December they announced the title, cover and tracklist of the first volume: Endkadenz Vol. 1. The first single from Endkadenz Vol. 1, Un po' esageri, was released on 8 January 2015, and on the 23rd it was announced there would be a new member of the group, Giuseppe Chiara, a session player who would accompany the group during live performances. He was found by Sammarelli, who, under the pseudonym "Eleanor Spinetti," posted an advertisement on the Villaggio Musicale website reading "Rock group started in the Bergamo area is looking for an experienced musician, man or woman between 18 and 40 years old, who can play keyboards, guitar and sing (for backup voices), for demanding tours in Italy and Europe. Long hours required, commitment and above all passion. No cover". The group would rehearse with various different musicians who responded, eventually selecting Chiara.

After the promotion of the album in Feltrinelli bookstores from 26 to 29 January across Milan, Romes, Naples and Bari, the first part of the tour began with nine dates between the end of February and the beginning of March with Jennifer Gentle. The second part of the tour that was dedicated to the first volume started at the end of March and did not feature Jennifer Gentle.

On 22 March 2015 they announced a single from the first volume of Endkadenz, Contro la ragione, accompanied by a music video directed by Pepsy Romanoff, while on 31 July the third and final single, Nevischio, whose video (edited by Marianna Schivardi) was shot during two dates of the Endkadenz Vol. 1 tour, on March 2 in Milan (shots by Paolo De Francesco, Jarno Iotti and Nico Cagarelli) and on 15 July in Rome (shot by Dandaddy and Davide Caucci). The second part of Endkadenz, Endkadenz Vol. 2, was released on 28 August alongside the first single of the second volume, Colle immane, with a video directed by Samson Pomponny. On 3 December, through the band's Facebook page, the music video of Identikit, the second single from Endkadenz Vol. 2, directed by Alberto himself, was promoted.

Throughout 2015 and 2016, the Endkadenz tours were a huge success, and the band announced the European Endkadenz Tour 2016 in May on their Facebook page. Verdena toured Europe with 8 dates in Barcelona, Paris, Cologne, London, Munich, Luxembourg, Berlin, and Hamburg. The European tour was brought alongside a short series of shows in Italy, where they would play at small clubs, including venues where Verdena debuted in the late 90s (ex. Bloom di Mezzago). Each show would end with a cover in English, chosen in rotation between Nirvana, the Melvins and Led Zeppelin (all bands that famously influenced the group). In June, they unexpectedly announced another 6 summer concerts only in Italy (Caerano di San Marco, Cesena, Pesaro, Olbia, Prato and Desio) with a setlist of solely Endkadenz Vol. 1 and Vol. 2 songs.

On 2 September 2016 a split EP came out in collaboration with losonouncane, simply titled Split EP. The two bands decided to record a pair of covers by the other artist. Verdena would play two songs from losonouncane's DIE album, specifically Tanca and Carne, while the latter recorded a cover for each volume of Endkadenz, specifically Diluvio and Identikit.

=== Volevo Magia ===
In September 2022, the band released Volevo Magia, their seventh studio album, marking their return after a long hiatus since their previous 2015 project. The record, issued by Capitol Records / Universal Music, was followed by a tour across major Italian clubs starting in October of the same year.

After the tour, in 2023, longtime bassist Roberta Sammarelli announced her departure from the band, a decision made public in October 2025. After nearly thirty years together, she chose to pursue a new path with the supergroup "Sì! Boom! Voilà!", while brothers Alberto and Luca Ferrari stated that they would continue as a duo and were working on a new album.

== Lyrics ==
Alberto writes the lyrics of their songs, just the lyrics have often been criticized for the lack of external content, Alberto, however, stated several times to write solely to the melody and music, so that the words give only "color disk "without then tell stories or convey some meaning. The texts are not written but with the cut-up technique (as typified by the first album by the Italian band Afterhours). The composition of the texts are first singing in a fake British musical based on the track and then replace the English words with Italian words that sound good. The texts, as already mentioned, have no meaning or political narrative, but they are Alberto dream-like hallucinations. In another interview Alberto said: "They can in my opinion be interpreted differently, depending on the person, or at the time. [...] Everyone has his things differently and feel differently. My lyrics don't make sense, and at the same time have more than one. They also have three/four."

== The Henhouse ==
The Henhouse Studio was originally a chicken coop behind Ferrari's house that was reworked into a recording studio in 1992. The album Il suicidio dei samurai was recorded independently at the Henhouse. In 2004 the studio was expanded for the album, adding in a control room equipped with a mixer and a 24-track reel recorder. In 2011, the Rockit site recorded an interview with the group (made by Carlo Pastore) and live songs from the album Wow in the Henhouse.

== Discography ==
=== Albums ===
- Verdena (1999)
- Solo un Grande Sasso (2001)
- Il Suicidio dei Samurai (2004)
- Requiem (2007)
- Wow (2011)
- Endkadenz Vol. 1 (2015)
- Endkadenz Vol. 2 (2015)
- Volevo magia (2022) – No. 2 Italy

=== Demo albums ===
- Verdena (1997)

=== EPs ===
- Valvonauta (1999)
- Viba (2000)
- Spaceman (2001)
- Miami Safari (2002)
- Luna (2004)
- Elefante (2004)
- Caños (2007)
- Radar (Ejabbabbaje) (2011)
- Split EP (with Iosonouncane) (2016)

=== Singles ===
- "Valvonauta" (1999)
- "Viba" (2000)
- "Spaceman" (2001)
- "Nel Mio Letto" (2001)
- "Miami Safari" (2002)
- "Luna" (2004)
- "Elefante" (2004)
- "Perfect Day" (2004)
- "Phantastica" (2004)
- "Muori Delay" (2007)
- "Caños" (2007)
- "Angie" (2007)
- "Isacco Nucleare" (2008)
- "Razzi, Arpia, Inferno e Fiamme" (2010)
- "Scegli Me (Un mondo che tu non vuoi)" (2011)
- "Miglioramento" (2011)
- "Un Po' Esageri" (2015)
- "Contro La Ragione" (2015)
- "Nevischio" (2015)
- "Colle Immane" (2015)
- "Identikit" (2015)
- "Chaise Longue" (2022)
- "Crystal Ball" (2023)
