= Your Murder Mixtape =

Studio album by The Banner
- Released: December 16, 2003
- Genre: Hardcore punk
- Length: 44:36
- Labels: Blackout Records; Brightside Records
- Producer: ???

The Banner chronology
Posthumous (EP) (2003)	Your Murder Mixtape (2003)	Each Breath Haunted (2005)

Professional ratings
Review scores
Source	Rating
Punknews	2.5/5 stars
AllMusic	1.5/5 stars

Your Murder Mixtape is the first full-length album from New Jersey, U.S. band, The Banner. It was released on Blackout Records in December, 2003 and it follows the Posthumous EP which was released in the same year. The album takes influence from several musical styles with an overall melodic hardcore sound.

In line with the band's horrorcore imagery, the cover depicts a photograph of a cassette tape clipped to a blood-soaked diary. The inlay follows this theme through, with the lyrics largely in handwriting as if in a diary. The label on the CD itself is black with a splash of red to symbolise a bloodstained handprint. The song material and lyrics are quite dark, covering subjects consistent with the cover and inlay image, such as zombies, murder, conflict, and personal rejection. In spite of all this imagery, the band still felt the need to add a liner note proclaiming, "These songs are fictional and aren't a veiled threat to anyone living or dead. Seriously".

== Overview ==
The first few tracks are in the same vein as the band's Posthumous (EP) material, mixing metal with hardcore in equal measures, before moving into more intricate arrangements with more metal elements. The metal material culminates with "Black Duct Tape" which is verging on black metal, before moving back to hardcore with "Red Devil". The closing track proper – before the silence and hidden track – "September Song" slows the pace down slightly and is perhaps a precursor for the material to come on their next album, Each Breath Haunted. Throughout, Joey Southside's vocals are harsher than they were on the debut EP. They are more in keeping with metalcore band vocal styles, as opposed to the "classic" hardcore vocals before.

The general consensus among fans was that this was not a huge step forward for the band and the production was somewhat understated, but it still had the promise that would be delivered on their next album.

== Track listing ==
- All songs written by The Banner, unless stated
1. "Zombie Onslaught" – 3:13
2. "Skies Go Black" – 2:44
3. "Sometimes They Come Back" – 3:40
4. "Die Fighting" – 3:34
5. "Apocalypse" – 3:17
6. "I Found Your Diary" – 2:53
7. "Black Duct Tape" – 2:27
8. "Red Devil" – 2:47
9. "Night of the Rope" – 2:25
10. "September Song" – 17:36
- Track 10 is only actually 4:38, it is followed by approx 13 minutes of silence

== Credits ==
- Joey – vocals
- Garrett – guitar
- Chris – guitar
- Chris "Fingerz" Larsen – bass
- Ian – drums
- Kevin Manion is credited with playing second guitar, but not as a band member
- Tim Shaw from Ensign – guest vocals on "Die Fighting"
- Frank Iero – guest vocals on "Black Duct Tape"
- Joe Mosh – guest vocals on "Night Of The Rope"
- Sound clips courtesy of the movies Night of the Living Dead, Aliens, and Zombie
- Mixed in the Haunted House of Creep Records
