= Breakdown (band) =

American hardcore band

- Origin: Yonkers, New York, U.S.
- Genres: Hardcore punk; tough guy hardcore; alternative metal
- Years active: 1986–present
- Members: Jeff Perlin; Don Angelilli; Carl Porcaro; Rich McLoughlin; Anthony Drago

Breakdown is an American hardcore band formed in Yonkers, New York, in late 1986. The band emerged from the mid-1980s New York hardcore scene, where they helped to pioneer the sound of tough guy hardcore.

== History ==
Breakdown was started in 1986, during the resurgence of the hardcore scene. Despite being a NYHC band based in Yonkers, Breakdown did not have the Lower East Side Crew-mentality of Warzone and Agnostic Front. By a similar token, unlike some of their other contemporaries like Gorilla Biscuits and Youth of Today, Breakdown was not a straight edge positive band. They are considered more along the lines of Sheer Terror for their more metallic sound and less-than-positive lyrics. However, Breakdown always had somewhat of a tongue-in-cheek element to them, mostly due to singer Jeff Perlin's humorous live banter and lyrics.

Contrary to popular belief, the original Breakdown lineup only lasted for less than a year. The band continued on with new members over the years, with Jeff Perlin being the only original member.

Through all the years Breakdown never did a tour of the U.S., concentrating mostly on the Northeast and Canada. They toured Europe 4 times (1999, 2001, 2009, 2010) with European bands including Rykers and Backfire. They also toured Japan in 2001.

Starting in 2003 through 2007 Perlin was the vocalist for Slumlords, a Baltimore-based hardcore/punk band. Slumlords allowed Perlin to write lyrics with a much less serious slant while allowing for a more diverse vocal delivery by adding punk, rock n roll and some heavy metal to the mix while still relying on hardcore for the basis of their sound.

Breakdown started playing gigs again in 2008, most notably the Black N Blue Bowl held in Brooklyn, NYC and the Built to Last Festival in Providence, RI in May 2009. They have also played gigs in NYC in September 2009 and the Baltimore "Fall Brawl" in October 2009. They played two gigs in Europe in November 2009 (Antwerp, Belgium and Leipzig, Germany) to support Backfire for their last two performances as well as a four-date tour of Netherlands, Germany, France and Belgium in August 2010. In November 2010, they made their return to New York City's Webster Hall (which they last played 1988 when it was called The Ritz) opening for Sheer Terror. There have been rumors of Breakdown working on new material for general release, which would be their first output since 2001. But these rumors have been laid to rest after Breakdown decided to pack it in and not record or play any additional shows as of February 2011.

In February 2012, it was formally announced that the original 1986 lineup was reforming to write, record and release new material. This lineup consists of vocalist Jeff Perlin, guitarists Carl Porcaro and Don Angellili, bassist Rich McLoughlin and drummer Anthony Drago. This is the first time in 25 years that this lineup has performed together.

== Releases ==
Breakdown released a demo (cassette) in 1987, as well as a track on the NYHC compilation, Revelation Records' New York City Hardcore: The Way It Is and the equally important Blackout Records' Where the Wild Things Are compilation. The "'87 Demo" was eventually released as a 7-inch EP (Blackout/Noiseville), but did not include all of the songs that were available on the original cassette demo. Breakdown also recorded several demos over the years, including "Running Scared" cassette. Notable releases include the classic EP Blacklisted (Eyeball Records) along with the popular Plus Minus LP (Eyeball Records) and not as well-received Battle Hymns for an Angry Planet LP (Thorp Records/I Scream Records). Breakdown performed at least four live sets on Crucial Chaos, WNYU's hardcore radio show between 1987 and 1994. Dead Serious Records has re-released the demo 7" with a modified artwork. This 7" re-release was a part of the NYHC HALL OF FAME series. The notorious Lost & Found Records also released a semi-unauthorized bootleg of their material entitled "Dissed and Dismissed".

== Members ==
Jeff Perlin is the only member to remain in the band from its inception.

=== Original demo era line-up ===
- Jeff Perlin – vocals
- Don Angelilli – guitar
- Carl Porcaro – guitar
- Rich McLoughlin – bass
- Anthony Drago – drums

=== Past members ===
- Lou Alfidi – drums
- Mark Sisto – bass (Maximum Penalty, Joe Coffee)
- Ritchie Kennon – guitar (Subzero)
- Larry Kaplan – drums (now a leader of the Neoconservatism movement)
- Chris Fist – guitar (NYC Clenched Fist, Mental Abuse, Life's Blood)
- Rob DeFrosia – guitar (Lethal Aggression, Ironbound NYC)
- Larry Susi – bass (Subzero, Crusade(nyc))
- Mike Dijan – guitar (Skarhead, Laws of Gravity, Crown of Thornz, Cold Front)
- A.J. Novello – guitar (Leeway, Cro-Mags, Both Worlds)
- Joe Farley – drums (Oblivion)
- Scott Brandt-guitar (Street Sense, Constant Grief (w-Joe Farley) Remainder)
- Alec Walushka – guitar
- Harry Kazakos – bass (Cold Front, Laws of Gravity)
- Lou Medina – drums (Cold Front, All Out War)
- Ray Green – drums (District 9, Laws of Gravity)

== See also ==
- List of beatdown hardcore bands
