= Funeral for a Feeling =

Album by Kill Your Idols

Funeral For a Feeling

Studio album by Kill Your Idols
- Released: July 17, 2001
- Recorded: May 6 – 13, 2001
- Genre: Hardcore punk, melodic hardcore, punk rock
- Length: 34:40
- Label: SideOneDummy
- Producer: Kill Your Idols

Kill Your Idols chronology
No Gimmicks Needed (2000)	Funeral For a Feeling (2001)	Split with Good Riddance (2001)

Professional ratings
Review scores
Source	Rating
Allmusic	2/5 stars

Funeral For a Feeling is the second full-length studio album from New York City hardcore punk band Kill Your Idols. It was released on July 17, 2001, on SideOneDummy Records.

== Track listing ==
1. "Madly" – 2:35
2. "Young (at Heart)" – 2:03
3. "The Seen" – 1:01
4. "Funeral for a Feeling" – 1:53
5. "By the Way" – 0:38
6. "A Better Place" – 1:47
7. "All the Difference" – 1:17
8. "This Is Not Goodbye, Just Goodnight" – 2:25
9. "With Blinders On" – 1:50
10. "Dead by Dawn" – 2:07
11. "Made to Be Broken" (Poison Idea) – 2:55
12. "Last Song" – 1:45
13. "Fall Out" – 1:42
14. "All That and Vans Too!" – 2:03
15. "I Will Defy" – 2:25
16. "Fashion Statement" – 2:01
17. "Goodbye My Love, Hello My Friend" – 4:13

== Personnel ==
- Andy West – vocals
- Gary Bennett – guitar
- Brian Meehan – guitar
- Paul Delaney – bass
- Raeph Glicken – drums
- Recorded May 6 – 13, 2001
- Produced by Kill Your Idols
- Engineered by Arik Victor and Mike Bardzik
