= Sheer Terror =

American hardcore punk band

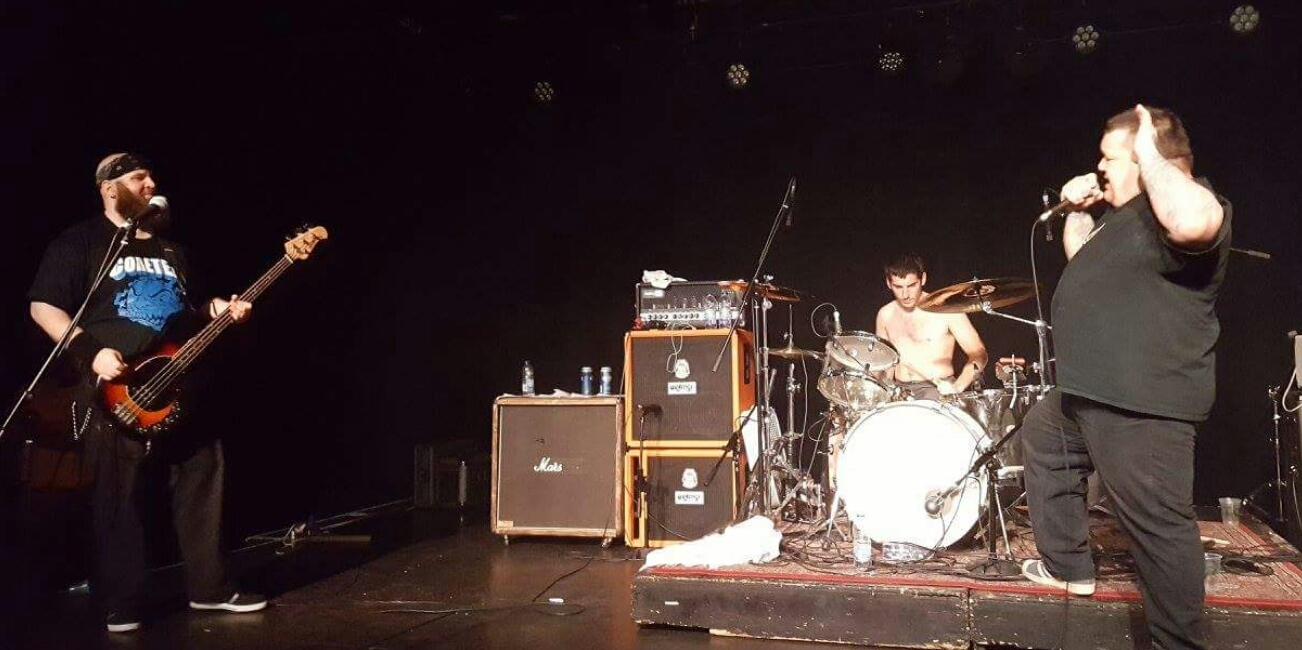
- Sheer Terror live in 2016

Background information
- Origin: New York City, U.S.
- Genres: Hardcore punk, tough guy hardcore, crossover thrash
- Years active: 1984–1998, 2004, 2010–present
- Labels: Blackout, MCA, Reaper Records
- Members: Paul Bearer; Henry Belfor; John Besser; Johnny Eggz

Sheer Terror are an American hardcore punk band from New York City. The band was one of the first to combine elements of heavy metal with a hardcore punk base, pioneering a heavier style of hardcore that would create many bands in the following decades. Formed in late 1984, the band stayed together until 1998, through numerous lineup changes and shifts in musical style. In October 2004, the band reunited for two shows at New York City's CBGB Club.

== History ==
The band first came into existence in December 1984 when former Fathead Suburbia vocalist Paul Bearer answered an ad in the Village Voice for a hardcore punk singer. Filling out the original lineup was guitarist Alan Blake, bassist Baron "Barry" Misuraca, and drummer Sam "Reid" Lohman. The band was featured on the 1985 One Big Crowd compilation, and released two cassette demos, No Grounds for Pity and Fall from Grace. Soon after the band broke up due to personality conflicts. Afterwards, Bearer would spend some time in southern California before returning to New York, where he reformed Sheer Terror with Blake, adding Mark Neuman on bass and Jason Martin on drums.

The band soon after began a longtime association with Blackout Records, who released some of their songs on the label's compilation Where the Wild Things Are, in 1989, along with a 7-inch Live at CBGB release. The following year, the band recorded their debut full length Just Can't Hate Enough. The record was engineered by Tommy Victor of Prong. As Victor also worked at CBGB, he was able to allow the band to record live at the famous bar in the morning and afternoon hours before shows were held. The record was released in Germany on Starving Missile Records, and later released stateside under the Blackout name. Just Can't Hate Enough quickly became one of the records that defined the new, heavier sound of hardcore that was emerging at the time, played by bands such as Biohazard and Killing Time, among others. The guitar tone and riffs, in particular, display a large heavy metal influence, especially from Swiss speed metallers Celtic Frost, who were allegedly one of Alan Blake's favorite bands. The band also became known for Bearer's no-nonsense stage personality, with some finding him offensive, and others enjoying his often blunt and obscenity filled humor.

Blake, however, exited the band soon after the record's release. He would later form Darkside, also known as Darkside NYC, which also featured a heavy Celtic Frost influence.

Neuman took the opportunity to switch to guitar, and Mike "Chickie" Walter, a former member of the crossover band Ludichrist, took over on bass duties, only to be replaced a year later by Keith "Zippy" McAdam. With the lineup of Bearer, Neuman, McAdam, and Martin, the band cut a new record in 1991 that was titled Ugly And Proud, and whose planned cover featured a bulldog belonging to Josh Silver of Type O Negative. Seeing the success of Biohazard's eponymous 1990 release, the band planned to release the LP under Maze Records. However, due to the amount of money and time spent on the Biohazard release, Maze was not in the position to release Ugly And Proud. The record was shelved by the label, much to the dismay of the band who could not convince the company to allow them to take the masters elsewhere.

In this time, the band experienced more member turnover, including the return of Chickie to bass duties, and an extended stint with a former glam metal drummer named Dave Todd. Paul Bearer recounts in the liner notes of a later release about his disbelief that Dave, while the band was in Europe, asked him who "Anarchy" was, thinking the circle-A logo he saw spray painted on walls belonged to a band. The tension of having someone in the band who did not understand punk rock ultimately led to finding a new drummer in Pat Cronin.

To make up for the lack of an album, Sheer Terror re-recorded many of the songs from Ugly and Proud, releasing the result on Blackout as Thanks fer Nuthin, a jab at the owner of Maze Records. According to Bearer, he originally wanted to call the record Canadian Scumbag. However, upon hearing of the band's new album, Maze Records quickly, and finally, released Ugly and Proud, leading to the band having two records on the market with mostly identical songs.

Some tours later, the Old, New, Borrowed, and Blue EP was released. Following the theme of the title, the track list included an old song, Walls, a new song, Broken, a cover ("borrowed") song, Everything's Fine by The Saints, and a slow ballad ("blue"), Goodbye, Farewell. It also included a short cover of Johnny Cash's "I Still Miss Someone". The cover depicted an old photograph of Bearer's parents' wedding. Both Bearer and Mark Neuman have commented that due to Josh Silver's production of the EP, it remains their favorite Sheer Terror release. The band even cut the only music video of their career for Broken, which featured a live action depiction of the song's subject, a despondent, alcoholic circus clown.

This, among other things, led to interest from MCA, who signed the band for the recording of 1995's Love Songs for the Unloved. Produced by Tommy Victor, the record reflected a changing band, with slower songs and more clean, operatic singing from Bearer, rather than his usual growls. The upbeat track For Rudy The Kraut even featured an almost ska-sounding horn section consisting of Tom Malone (trombone), Jim Hynes (trumpet) and Scott Kreitzer (tenor saxophone). Neuman was also not particularly satisfied with the overall sound of his guitar tracks, leading to the dismissal of Producer Victor, leaving production to be taken over by both Neuman and Walters. The record did not receive the expected attention from fans, and Sheer Terror was soon dropped from MCA, who Bearer later sarcastically referred to as "the Music Cemetery of America".

In the following years, Bearer's self admittedly "pig-headed" personality clashed with the other members of the band, leading to Cronin and Neuman's exit. Sheer Terror managed to press on with a lineup that included former Whiplash drummer Tony Scaglione, and future Cause for Alarm guitarist Jay Banks. This lineup lasted through a U.S. tour with Napalm Death. Shortly after, the band broke up, only to be revived in 1997 featuring Ex-Mind over Matter/Neglect drummer John Lafata, and current Kill Your Idols guitarist Gary Bennett. John Lafata then went on to tour and record with Madball, and Tony Scaglione was brought in once again. But eventually, Sheer Terror ended their 13-year career in 1998, immediately following a mildly successful European tour. Most members did not speak to each other for many years following the break-up.

== Reunion and reformation ==
In mid-2004 it was announced that the lineup of Bearer, Neuman, Chickie, and Cronin were again rehearsing and planned on playing a show to serve both as a reunion and as the final farewell the band was never able to give. The reaction from fans led to the booking of another show the following night, and on October 9 and 10, the band played two sold-out shows at CBGB, alongside opening bands such as Inhuman, Murphys Law, The Distance and Subzero. Footage from both nights, as well as an extensive documentary, was released as the Beaten by the Fists of God DVD in 2005. Many high-profile members of the punk rock and hardcore community were featured praising the band in the documentary, including members of Dropkick Murphys, Life of Agony, and Blood for Blood. Many former members were interviewed as well.

A new lineup of the band featuring Bearer, Michael De Lorenzo (guitar), Jason Çarter (bass), and Anthony Corallo (drums) played again on August 13, 2010, at the Starlight Ballroom in Philadelphia, PA as part of the annual This is Hardcore festival. Paul announced at the show that the band may begin to write new songs if the band is happy with the new material. Since that first show, the band has played several other shows in major US markets, Japan, and Europe. According to a post by Paul on the band's Facebook page "Really looking forward to working with guys who not only know the music, but actually feel it...It's not a competition, but a full-on threat...Hooray, for me...!!! Yes, not a jibe nor a slight...a truth."

At the end of 2012, Lawrence Nieroda aka Larry the hunter took over guitar duties in the band playing his first show in January 2013. Larry has done time in Murphy's Law, Subzero, Son of Skam, Inhuman, Loved & Hated and is currently also playing in Stigma.

By the end of 2013, Mike De Lorenzo was back on guitar.

And, by August 2016, De Lorenzo was let go.

In November 2016, Sheer Terror was joined by Johnny Eggz for their international tour. Johnny Eggz was formerly the front man and guitarist for The Mighty Pragmatics.

In September 2018, in response to praise received from alt-right Proud Boys co-founder Gavin McInnes, Bearer wrote on the band's Facebook page that the Proud Boys are not welcome anywhere in the vicinity of Sheer Terror.

By July 2019, Jason Carter and Gary Bennett had amicably left due to constrictions caused by their work schedules and the band's increasing live work schedule. The band continues as a four piece, with Brendan Porray on bass.

In 2021 they joined Slapshot and SkullCrack the 35 Years of Hardcore Tour. The group also held European tours in both 2022 and 2023.

By January 2023, Anthony Corallo was out of the band due to work constraints. By August of the same year, Brendan Porray was replaced due to logistics.

The current lineup of Sheer Terror is: Paul Bearer, Johnny Eggz (guitar), Henry Belfor (bass), and John Besser (drums)

In 2025 the band went on multiple tours including an East Coast/Midwest tour in May and European tour during the summer. On May 4, 2026 prior to a European tour Sheer Terror released a new single "Squat Diddler' from their upcoming Mini-LP 'Let These Be Our Troubles".

== Artistry ==
Many of the band lyrics come from Paul Bearer's life what surrounds him, in an interview with ox-fanzine he stated that “it’s not always beautiful it can be crazy and disgusting” also stating that it's influenced by “dark, hate-filled guitars” and the music's aggressive tone.

The band is known for their heavy-metal influenced hardcore style, raw production and heavily distorted guitars. While Sheer Terror is certainly aren't afraid of blending metal and punk Bearer describes their sound as more like Tom G. Warrior with a mixture of Oi! rather than the more modern “bouncy mosh parts” of hardcore. Blabbermouth.net wrote that the band "melded the ultra-aggressive hardcore punk of Discharge and The Nihlistics with the rock-solid low-end of proto-metal behemoths Black Sabbath and Motörhead".

They are credited for being one of the first bands to combine elements of heavy metal with a hardcore punk base, pioneering a heavier style of hardcore that would inspire many other bands in the following decades. They have influenced bands such as Pantera and Hatebreed.

== Members ==
Current

- Paul Bearer – vocals (1984–present)
- Johnny Eggz – guitars (2016–present)
- John Besser – drums (2022–present)
- Henry "Hank Hell" Belfor – bass (2023–present)

Former

- Alan Blake – guitars (1984–1989)
- Baron "Barry" Misuraca – bass (1984–1986)
- Sam "Reid" Lohman – drums (1984–1986)
- Mark Neuman – bass (1986–1989), guitar (1989–1995, 2004)
- Jason Martin – drums (1986–1991)
- Mike "Chickie" Walter – bass (1989–1989, 1991–1996, 1997–1998, 2004)
- Keith "Zippy" McAdam – bass (1990–1991)
- Dave Todd – drums (1991–1993)
- Pat Cronin – drums (1993–1995, 2004)
- Jay Banks – guitars (1995–1996)
- Tony Scaglione – drums (1995–1996, 1997–1998)
- Gary Bennett – guitars (1997–1998)
- John Lafata – drums (1997)
- Michael De Lorenzo – guitars (2010–2012, 2013–2016)
- Jason Carter – bass (2010–2019)
- Lawrence "Larry the Hunter" Nieroda – guitars (2012–2013)
- Anthony Corallo – drums (2010–2023)
- Brendan Porray – bass (2019–2023)

== Discography ==
=== Albums ===
- Just Can't Hate Enough – Blackout Records, 1989
- Ugly and Proud – Maze Records, 1991
- Thanks fer Nuthin – Blackout Records, 1992
- Love Songs for the Unloved – MCA Records, 1995
- Standing Up for Falling Down – Reaper Records, 2014
- Unheard Unloved – Blackout Records, 2016

=== EPs and singles ===
- Live at CBGB – Blackout Records, 1989
- I Need Lunch (split with Crawlpappy) – Suburban Voice, 1989
- Asshole and Prode – Halb 7 Records, 1993
- Old, New Borrowed, and Blue – Blackout Records, 1994
- Not Waving, Drowning – Blackout Records UK, 1996
- College Boy – MCA Records, 1995
- Spite – Reaper Records, 2011
- Kaos for Kristin – Dead City Records, 2013
- Darkened Days – Reaper Records, 2014
- Split with The Old Firm Casuals – Pitchfork Label, 2016
- Pall in the Family – Reaper Records, 2018
- New Life – Reaper Records, 2019
- Split with EyeHateGod – Take As Needed Records / Chronic Death, 2020

=== Demos ===
- No Grounds for Pity – self-released demo cassette, 1986
- Fall from Grace – self-released demo cassette, 1987
- Demo '88 – self-released demo cassette, 1988

=== Compilations ===
- One Big Crowd Compilation compilation – Big City Records, 1985
- No Grounds for Pity – Blackout Records Europe, 1996 – compilation of demos 1985 – 1988
- Where the Wild Things Are compilation – Blackout Records, 1989
- Satisfaction Guaranteed compilation – Nawpost Records, 1996
- Bulldog Edition (compilation of all Blackout! tracks) – Blackout Records, 2001

=== Live albums ===
- Drop Dead and Go to Hell – Dead City Records, 2004

=== DVDs ===
- Beaten by the Fists of God (reunion/documentary DVD) – Thorp Records, 2005
