= Crime in Stereo =

American punk band from New York City

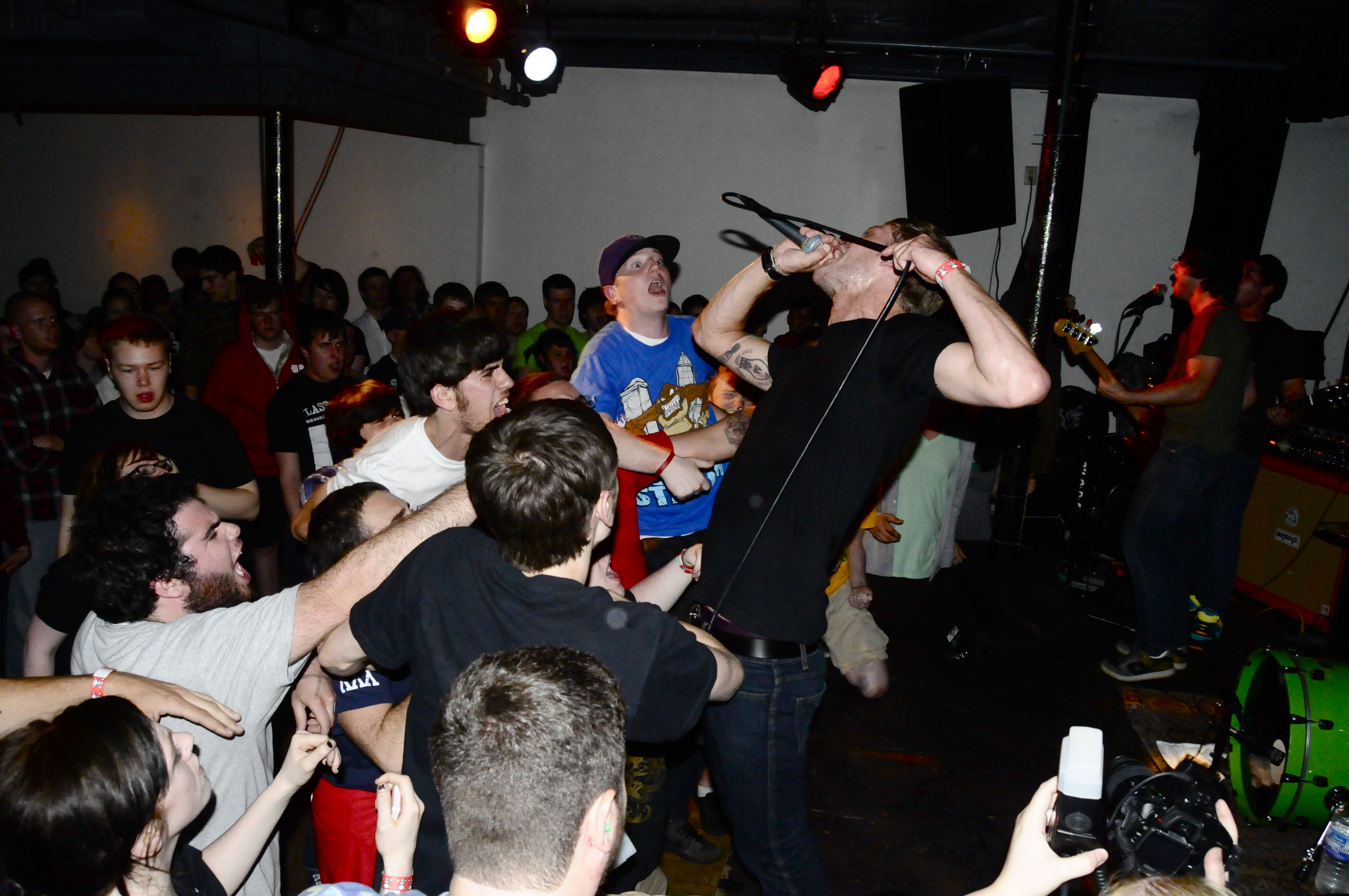
- Crime in Stereo performing live in 2007

Background information
- Origin: Levittown, New York, United States
- Genres: Hardcore punk; shoegaze; post-hardcore; emo; melodic hardcore
- Years active: 2001-2011, 2012-present
- Labels: Blackout!, Nitro, Bridge Nine, Pure Noise
- Members: Alex Dunne; Kristian Hallbert; Scotty Giffin; Gary Cioni; Eric Fairchild
- Past members: Eric Kuster; Dan McCabe; Matt Markosky; Mike Musilli; Elliott Markowitz; Matt McNally
- Website: Official Site

Crime in Stereo is a Long-Island-based hardcore punk band. The group released four full-length albums and a compilation, recording for the labels Blackout!, Nitro, and Bridge Nine before disbanding in 2010 and subsequently re-forming in 2012. Since 2012, the group have performed sporadically, released a song on a compilation in 2021, and eventually released their fifth full-length album, House & Trance in October 2023 on Pure Noise Records.

== History ==
Crime in Stereo formed in 2001 and recorded a homemade demo tape that same year. The band released their debut, a split with New York City's Kill Your Idols, in 2003 on Blackout! Records. In early 2004, the band released their debut full-length in conjunction with Brightside Records, Explosives and the Will to Use Them and was well received by several punk music webzines. In early 2005 the band signed with Nitro Records, owned by Dexter Holland of The Offspring. Although a four-song EP titled The Contract was released in July 2005 to finish up the band's contract with Blackout! Records / Brightside, the band released the Fuel. Transit. Sleep EP that same year with Nitro Records containing two songs from the following album, The Troubled Stateside, which was released April 18, 2006 on Nitro Records.

The band left Nitro Records some time after the release of The Troubled Stateside and signed to Bridge Nine Records who released their Mike Sapone-produced third full-length, Crime in Stereo Is Dead, on October 23, 2007. During this time several of the band's members held jobs outside of music; bassist Mike Musilli began teaching at the high school level, and guitarist Alex Dunne worked for the Democratic Party in the state of New York.

The band released a 10-song collections disc titled Selective Wreckage on Bridge 9 in late 2008.

Their fourth studio album, I Was Trying to Describe You to Someone, was released in February 2010. This record reached #23 on the Billboard Heatseekers chart. On August 9, 2010 they announced that Crime In Stereo was disbanding. On September 8, 2010, the band released a letter explaining the split.

In 2012, Crime In Stereo announced they would reform, planned to play live and record new material. A new song, "The Good Empire" was released as part of a compilation record in support of the Amityville Music Hall in 2021.

On October 27, 2023, Crime In Stereo released their first full-length album in 13 years, House & Trance, on Pure Noise Records.

== Members ==
Current

- Kristian Hallbert - vocals
- Alex Dunne - guitar, vocals
- Scotty Giffin - drums
- Gary Cioni - guitar
- Eric Fairchild - bass

Former

- Dan McCabe - guitar
- Matt Markosky - guitar
- Mike Musilli - bass
- Elliott Markowitz - bass
- Matt McNally - bass
- Eric Kuster - guitar

== Discography ==
Albums

- Explosives and the Will to Use Them (2004) Blackout! Records
- The Troubled Stateside (2006) Nitro Records [issued on vinyl (2008) Bridge Nine Records]
- Crime in Stereo Is Dead (2007) Bridge Nine Records
- I Was Trying to Describe You to Someone (2010) Bridge Nine Records
- House & Trance (2023) Pure Noise Records

Singles & EPs

- Basement Demo (2002?) self-released
- Demo (2003?) self-released
- Split with Kill Your Idols (2003) Blackout! Records
- The Contract (2005) Blackout! Records [issued on vinyl as Love (2007) Run For Cover Records & NO PANIC! Records (Europe)]
- Fuel. Transit. Sleep (2006) Nitro Records

Music Videos

- Small Skeletal (2007)
- I Am Everything I Am Not (2010)

Compilations

- Selective Wreckage (2008) Bridge Nine Records

Compilation appearances

- Beer: The Movie Soundtrack (2003) Triple Crown Records - "Here's to Things Gone Wrong"
- Broken Lamps And Hardcore Memories Vol. 2 (2004) Pastepunk Records - "Warning: Perfect Sideburns Do Not Make You Dangerous"
- Think Punk: Vol. 1 (2007) Rude Records - "Bicycles for Afghanistan"
- Bridge Nine Summer Compilation 2009 (2009) Bridge Nine Records - "war"
- Strong Island: The Best of Long Island Hardcore/Punk (2009) Brookvale Records - "Everywhere and All the Time"
- The AMC Comp, Volume 2 (2021) Long Island Emo - "The Good Empire"
