= No Grounds for Pity =

No Grounds For Pity

Compilation album by Sheer Terror
- Released: 1996
- Recorded: 1985 – 1988; New York City, USA
- Genre: Hardcore punk
- Length: 73:15
- Label: Blackout Records (Europe)
- Producer: Sheer Terror

Sheer Terror chronology
Love Songs for the Unloved (1995)	No Grounds For Pity (1996)	Bulldog Edition compilation (2001)

No Grounds For Pity is a compilation album of early demo material (including a 1986 demo of the same name) by the New York hardcore band, Sheer Terror. The tracks were recorded between 1985 and 1988 and released in Europe on Blackout Records in 1996 – a year after the band made their first major label release, Love Songs For the Unloved, on MCA Records.

The album demonstrates the heavy metal influenced hardcore punk style of the band and the production is suitably raw – nearly every track initiates with a brief blast of feedback leading to heavily distorted guitar riffs.

== Track listing ==
- All songs written by Sheer Terror

1985 demo

1. "Obsoletion" – 2:04
2. "Smile For a Price" – 2:53
3. "Howard Unruh" – 2:29
4. "Not Giving Up" – 3:02
5. "Burning Time" – 3:51
6. "Owe You Nothing" – 2:31
7. "Into My Life" – 4:31
8. "Fashion Fighter" – 2:37
9. "Ready to Halt" – 2:15

No Grounds For Pity demo

10. "Owe You Nothing" – 2:30
11. "Burning Time" – 3:46
12. "Into My Life" – 4:32
13. "Not Giving Up" – 2:50
14. "Only 13" – 2:01
15. "Obsoletion" – 1:57
16. "Howard Unruh" – 2:19
17. "Rome Song" – 1:45

Fall From Grace demo

18. "Ashes, Ashes" – 2:29
19. "Walls" – 2:33
20. "Ready to Halt" – 2:20
21. "Only 13" – 2:02
22. "Into My Life" – 4:28
23. "Burning Time" – 3:43

Live 1986

24. "Smile For a Price" – 3:02
25. "Everything and Nothing" – 1:51

1988 demo

26. "Twisting and Turning" – 2:48

== Credits ==
- Paul Bearer – vocals, all tracks
- Alan Blake – guitar, all tracks
- Baron "Barry" Misuraca – bass, tracks 1 – 17
- Mark Neuman – bass, tracks 18 – 26
- Sam "Reid" Lohman – drums, tracks 1 – 17
- Jason Martin – drums, tracks 18 – 26
- Recorded between 1985 – 1988 in New York City, USA
- Produced by Sheer Terror

== Miscellanea ==
- The back cover contains a misprint in that it lists a 27th track, another version of "Burning Time" which does not actually appear on the album
- Howard Unruh is a World War II veteran who embarked on a killing spree in 1949
