= Kill Your Idols =

American hardcore punk band

- Also known as: KYI
- Origin: Long Island and New York City
- Genre: Hardcore punk
- Years active: 1995–2007; 2013–present
- Labels: Side One Dummy; Blackout!
- Members: Andy West; Gary Bennett; Mike DeLorenzo; Anthony Corallo

Kill Your Idols is an American hardcore punk band from New York, active from 1995 through 2007 and again from 2013 to the present. They were signed to SideOneDummy Records. Their releases on SideOne were Funeral for a Feeling (2001), a split with 7 Seconds in 2004, and From Companionship to Competition (2005). Other notable releases by the band were No Gimmicks Needed (2000) and This Is Just the Beginning... (1998), which were released on Blackout! Records. The band released several 7-inch EPs, splits with other bands (including Full Speed Ahead, Fisticuffs, Voorhees, Good Riddance, and Poison Idea), multiple compilation tracks, and two full-length LPs in their 11-year run. Most of their records were released on vinyl as well as compact disc. Some were released on different colors of vinyl, different sleeve covers, hand numbered tour presses, and picture discs, making their records a favorite among collectors.

The members cite Poison Idea, Negative Approach, Sheer Terror, Agnostic Front, Minor Threat, Warzone, Sick of It All, and 7 Seconds as some of their influences. Kill Your Idols are very fast with a metal-like dual guitar sound, topped off by shouted vocals. While they are sonically aggressive, they employed hints of melody in their song structure. Although they derived many of their influences from the California and D.C. hardcore scenes, they are considered a New York hardcore band.

== Biography ==
The band took their name from the title of a song by Situated Chaos: a Long Island hardcore band that existed in the 1990s. Founding members Andy West and Gary Bennett chose the name because the lyrics of the song reflected how they felt about hardcore. They both expressed interest in forming an old school hardcore band, to counter the post-hardcore and beatdown style bands that were popular at the time. Situated Chaos front man Vinnie Segerra ran a DIY label called Mint-Tone Records, which released a 7-inch EP by Bennett's first band Big Sniff. After the band broke up, Segerra put Bennett in touch with West. They recorded their first practice in 1995, and wrote their first song.

Once they released their first demo, recorded at their first CBGB show in 1996, Segerra got them their first deal with Bitter Sweet Records and the band went into the studio to record what would become the 12 Inch EP. The label folded prior to its release, and the band brought the masters to Brett Clarin of None of the Above Records. The record was officially released in 1997. They then booked their first-ever summer tour down the east coast of the United States. It wasn't long after when the band signed to Bill Wilson's Blackout! label, releasing the EP This Is Just the Beginning in 1998, and their first LP No Gimmicks Needed in 2000.

From 1998 until 2002, the band toured relentlessly across the United States, parts of Canada, Europe, and even a short tour of Japan and Korea. The band toured with many other important hardcore and punk bands of the day including H2O, Good Riddance, The Casualties, 7 Seconds, Agnostic Front, Death by Stereo, The Nerve Agents, Kid Dynamite, and many others. As a result of this, they earned a small but loyal grassroots following of underground punk and hardcore fans. Most of their songs dealt with depression, anxiety, the pain of loss, day-to-day problems, and the social politics of the punk scene. The band prided themselves on their DIY ethic, and largely worked with similarly oriented promoters and record labels. The band never took on a manager, and only took on a booking agent for a short time when their touring schedule was at its peak. In 2001, the band signed to SideOneDummy Records, a well-known independent based in California. This afforded the band more widespread distribution, college radio play, and offers to tour with much bigger bands and play much larger venues. SideOne would release their LP's Funeral For A Feeling and From Companionship To Competition.

=== Breakup ===
By 2003, the band was almost completely burned out from the road, and took to only playing locally, mostly at legendary venue CBGB's. They also recorded from time to time, releasing From Companionship To Competition in 2005 and their final EP in 2006 titled Salmon Swim Upstream. Kill Your Idols decided to officially call it quits in 2007, and played their final shows in May in Philadelphia, New Jersey, and New York. The last show in New York was held at a VFW hall in eastern Long Island. Right before the band went on, the show was raided by local police and fire officials and was shut down due to over-occupancy. Fans and friends of the band quickly reorganized the event later the same night in the parking lot of a band rehearsal space in an industrial area. Complete with a PA system and full backline, the band ripped through as many of their songs as they could before the police arrived again. After they broke up, the members took interest in other musical projects and started families.

=== Reunion and later years (2013-present) ===
On May 19, 2013, Kill Your Idols reunited to play at the Black 'N' Blue Bowl at Webster Hall in New York City, six years after their initial breakup to a very welcoming crowd. In 2015, they played two sold out shows on March 20 and 21st in New York and New Jersey respectively. Friday was held at Saint Vitus Bar In Brooklyn, New York and Saturday at GameChanger World in Howell, New Jersey. Both of these shows were benefits for Nate Gluck from Ensign, who was diagnosed with cancer in 2014. The Saturday show was a part of NateFest, and featured sets from bands including Sheer Terror, former touring mates Indecision, and Bigwig. They continued to play occasionally throughout the 2010s, most notably at the Warzone tribute show, held at Tompkins Square Park in 2017. Drummer Vinnie Value was a part of the house band for the Warzone set, having been their drummer until the passing of Raybeez in 1997. In April 2018, they embarked on a short east coast run with Fireburn, playing in Boston, Brooklyn, and Philadelphia. They continued to play singular shows throughout 2019, including at Skid Row Garage in York, Pennsylvania.

On January 20, 2020, drummer Vinnie Value died. Kill Your Idols dedicated their February 29, 2020, show at Revolution in Long Island to him. Anthony Corallo from Sheer Terror filled his spot that night, and joined the band that year.

During the COVID-19 pandemic, the band found themselves writing new material through online communication. In mid-2020, Kill Your Idols announced they would be releasing their first new material in over fifteen years. They include a brand new 12-inch vinyl release on Triple B Records, as well as split EPs with Vermont's The Path and hardcore band Rule Them All. The split with Rule Them All was released on March 4, 2022, through Flatspot Records. It features two new songs titled "Tragic" and "Simple, Short, & Fast".

== Other projects ==
Many past and present members of Kill Your Idols have been constant figures in the Long Island and New York hardcore scenes since the 1990s. Guitarist Gary Bennett and current drummer Anthony Corallo play in the legendary New York hardcore band Sheer Terror, with Bennett having been with them since the late 1990s. Corallo is an audio engineer, runs his own label Chronic Death Records, and has been a fixture in the hardcore scene since the 2000s. Bennett also formed Deathcycle, a crossover thrash band featuring original member Ron Grimaldi, with Paul Delaney joining later on. Paul would go on to form black metal band Black Anvil alongside Gary and previous drummer Raeph Glicken, soon after the 2007 breakup. Prior to joining Kill Your Idols, Raeph spent time drumming in multiple New York hardcore bands, including SFA and Cause For Alarm, playing on the latter's final album Beneath The Wheel. Current bassist Mike DeLorenzo and former guitarist Brian Meehan both spent time playing in the Long Island band Milhouse, with Meehan leaving prior to joining Kill Your Idols in 1998. They've also both been members of hardcore/metal band Celebrity Murders. Mike and former drummer Vinnie Value formed Skinheads Still Scare People (S.S.S.P.), which was a hardcore/Oi!-style project featuring Anthony Corallo on drums. S.S.S.P. dissolved following Vinnie's passing in 2020. Vocalist Andy West joined Too Many Voices in 2011, singing on their demo tape that same year, later to depart a short time afterward.

== Members ==
- Andy West – vocals
- Gary Bennett II – guitar
- Mike DeLorenzo – bass
- Anthony Corallo – drums

=== Past members ===
- Jim Conaboy – drums (1995-1999)
- Joe Martin – drums (1999-2000)
- Raeph Glicken – drums (2000-2003, 2013-2015)
- Vinnie Value – drums (2003-2007, 2016-2019; died 2020)
- John Leonardi – bass (1995-1997)
- Paul Delaney – bass (1998-2003, 2007, 2013-2015)
- Brian Meehan – guitar (1998-2007, 2013)
- Hugo Fitz – guitar (2019-2021)
- Dave Oster – drums
- Ron Grimaldi – drums
- Mike "Chickie" Walter – guitar
- Jon Abarno – guitar
- Dan Lerch – bass
- Mike Disseto – guitar

== Discography ==
=== LPs ===
- No Gimmicks Needed (Blackout!, 2000)
- Funeral for a Feeling (Side One Dummy, 2001)
- Kill Your Idols (Grapes of Wrath/Reflections Records, 2002)
  - Europe only release featuring re-recordings of tracks from past compilations and split EPs
- From Companionship to Competition (SideOneDummy, 2005)
- Live at CBGB's – July 30th, 2000 (Blackout!, 2005)

=== EPs ===
- 12-inch E.P. (None of the Above Records, 1997)
- This Is Just the Beginning (Blackout!, 1998)
- Funeral for a Feeling (Side One Dummy, 2001)
  - 3 tracks from Funeral for a Feeling and 1 unreleased track
- For Our Friends (Lifeline Records, 2003)
- Salmon Swim Upstream (Vicious Circle Records, 2006)

=== Split EPs ===
- I Hate the Kids, Split EP w/ Fisticuffs (Motherbox Records, 1998)
- Split EP w/ Full Speed Ahead (Hellbent Records, 1999)
- Split EP w/ The Nerve Agents (Mankind Records, 2000)
- Split EP w/ Voorhees (Indecision Records, 2000)
  - Part of the Indecision Records Split Series
- Split EP w/ Good Riddance (Jade Tree Records, 2001)
- Split EP w/ Crime in Stereo (Rocket Punch/Blackout!, 2003)
- Split EP w/ 7 Seconds (Side One Dummy, 2004)
  - all songs from From Companionship to Competition LP
- Live on WLUW - Live Split EP w/ Modern Life Is War (Lifeline Records, 2005)
- Split EP w/ Poison Idea (TKO Records, 2007)
  - all songs from Funeral for a Feeling LP
- Split EP w/ Rule Them All (Flatspot Records, 2022)

=== Collections ===
- 4 3/4" CD (None of the Above Records, 1998)
  - collects the 12-inch E.P. with 3 live sessions
- This Is Just The Beginning (Blackout!/Cortex Records, 1998)
- Bite The Bullet (Know Records, 1999)
  - Vinyl only European release, collects This Is Just The Beginning and the 12-inch E.P.
- The Skinnier Years (Vicious Circle Records/State of Grace, 2003)
  - Collects early recording sessions and the 1996 Live at CBGB's Demo
- Something Started Here (Lifeline/Get Outta Town Records, 2007)
  - Collects compilation appearances and split EPs
