= Where the Wild Things Are (Blackout Records album) =

Where The Wild Things Are

Compilation album by Various Artists
- Released: 1989
- Recorded: New York City, USA
- Genre: Hardcore punk
- Length: 38:59
- Label: Blackout Records
- Producer: Various Artists

Where The Wild Things Are is a 1989 compilation album of New York hardcore tracks by various artists. It was the first release on the hardcore punk specialist label Blackout Records.

== Track listing ==
- All songs written by and produced by the stated artists
1. Outburst: "The Hardway" – 2:36
2. Outburst: "Controlled" – 1:35
3. Killing Time: "Brightside" – 2:29
4. Killing Time: "Backtrack" – 2:34
5. Life's Blood: "Reckoning Force" – 1:14
6. Life's Blood: "Counting On" – 2:13
7. Breakdown: "All I Ask" – 0:43
8. Breakdown: "Dissed And Dismissed" – 1:41
9. Breakdown: "Kickback" – 1:47
10. Sheer Terror: "Cup Of Joe" – 2:47
11. Sheer Terror: "Not Giving Up" – 2:37
12. Maximum Penalty: "Immaculate Conception" – 2:50
13. Maximum Penalty: "Hate" – 1:35
14. Uppercut: "Down For The Count" – 2:02
15. Uppercut: "Am I Clear?" – 3:36
16. N.B.S.H.: "Hellminded" – 1:55
17. N.B.S.H.: "Desperate" – 3:09
18. Gorilla Biscuits: "Sittin' Round At Home" – 1:38
