= Frailty (The Banner album) =

Studio album by The Banner
- Released: July 10, 2008
- Recorded: November, 2007 – March 2, 2008
- Genre: Metalcore, hardcore punk
- Length: 33:19
- Label: Ferret Music
- Producer: Will Putney

The Banner chronology
Each Breath Haunted (2005)	Frailty (2008)	Greying (2014)

Frailty is the third full-length album released by The Banner on Ferret Music. It continued the band's horror themes and dark tone; however it has a heavier sound than past releases. It was released on July 10, 2008.

== Development ==
Joey and Will Putney started writing Frailty in November 2007. On November 23, 2007 the album name was posted on their blog on myspace and The Banner said "THIS RECORD WILL BE HEAVIER THAN THE OTHER RECORDS, we’re telling you now! ha ha we know a lot of you love the original EP (Posthumous) shit. we loved it also, so we have, infact, [sic] decided that this record we’re going to a, what we feel a heavier tuning for the songs." They finished recording the guitars on February 16, 2008 and started recording the vocals on February 18, 2008. On March 2, The Banner stated that they still had to do the "non mastering" portions of the album and announced that the release date would be in June. On April 3, The Banner stated that the album was complete including the artwork and that Frailty was up for pre-sale.

== Track listing ==
1. Welcome Fuckers - 1:09
2. The Wolf - 4:14
3. Leechbath - 2:08
4. A Hellbound Heart - 4:10
5. On Hooks - 2:38
6. IWIWD - 1:04
7. Sphrenia - 3:15
8. Funerals - 1:45
9. Dusk - 4:29
10. I Am Legion - 3:47
11. Ratflesh - 1:29
12. The Father and the Wayward Son - 4:31
