= From Companionship to Competition =

Studio album by Kill Your Idols
- Released: January 25, 2005
- Genre: Hardcore punk, melodic hardcore
- Length: 28:39
- Label: SideOneDummy Records
- Producer: Noah Evans; Kill Your Idols

Kill Your Idols chronology
Split with Full Speed Ahead (2004)	From Companionship to Competition (2005)	Live at CBGB (2005)

Professional ratings
Review scores
Source	Rating
AllMusic	3.5/5 stars
Kerrang!	3/5 stars
Punknews.org	4/5 stars

From Companionship to Competition is an album by New York City hardcore punk band Kill Your Idols. It was released in January 2005 on SideOneDummy Records.

== Critical reception ==
SF Weekly called the album the band's "finest, most satisfying, best-produced (but not slick-sounding) album to date."

== Track listing ==
1. "Intro/Blown Up, Burnt Out"–1:31
2. "Stuck in a Rut"–1:48
3. "I Hate My Guts"–2:28
4. "20 Bucks" – 0:14
5. "Only Dicks Don't Like Black Flag"–1:39
6. "From Companionship to Competition"–2:18
7. "Your Wish Is My Command"–2:24
8. "We've Tried Nothing and We're All Out of Ideas"–1:02
9. "Miserable and Satisfied"–1:52
10. "Don't Call Me, I Won't Call You"–2:12
11. "Make Up Your Minds"–2:16
12. "15 Minutes"–1:57
13. "I'll Call You Back"–2:22
14. "Still Pist"–1:23
15. "Looking Back"–3:13

== Credits ==
- Andy West – vocals
- Gary Bennett II – guitar, backing vocals
- Brian Meehan – guitar, backing vocals
- Mike DeLorenzo – bass
- Vinnie Value – drums
- Produced by Noah Evans and Kill Your Idols
- Engineered by Noah Evans and Dean Baltulonis
