= I Was Trying to Describe You to Someone (Crime in Stereo album) =

Studio album by Crime in Stereo
- Released: February 23, 2010
- Genre: Melodic hardcore; post-hardcore
- Length: 39:57
- Label: Bridge Nine
- Producer: Mike Sapone

Crime in Stereo chronology
Crime in Stereo Is Dead (2007)	I Was Trying to Describe You to Someone (2010)	House and Trance (2023)

I Was Trying to Describe You To Someone is the fourth studio album by American melodic hardcore band, Crime in Stereo. It was released on February 23, 2010 on Bridge Nine Records, their last release for the label. The band released a new song, "Drugwolf", on their MySpace page on January 19, 2010.

== Critical reception ==
Professional ratings
Review scores
Source	Rating
Alternative Press	4.5/5 stars
Alter the Press!	4/5 stars
Inked	(favorable)
Pastepunk	(favorable)
Redefine	(somewhat favorable)
review rinse repeat	4/5 stars
Rock Sound	9/10 stars
ThePunkSite.com	4.5/5 stars
TMTM	(9.4/10)
Strange Glue	9/10 stars
Under The Gun Review	9.5/10 stars

The record received a review of 4.5/5 in the March 2010 issue of Alternative Press magazine. The magazine described it as an "equally ambitious, unpredictable follow-up..." to their third release ...Is Dead.

Exclaim! named "I Was Trying to Describe You To Someone" as the No. 5 Punk Album of 2010.

== Track listing ==
1. "Queue Moderns" - 1:59
2. "Drugwolf" - 3:53
3. "Exit Halo" - 5:45
4. "Not Dead" - 3:21
5. "Odalisque" - 3:45
6. "Young" - 3:50
7. "Type One" - 3:52
8. "Republica" - 4:13
9. "I Am Everything I Am Not" - 3:57
10. "Dark Island City" - 2:23
11. "I Cannot Answer You Tonight" - 3:05
