= Crime in Stereo Is Dead =

Is Dead

Studio album by Crime in Stereo
- Released: October 23, 2007
- Recorded: 2007
- Genre: Melodic hardcore; post-hardcore; hardcore punk
- Label: Bridge Nine

Crime in Stereo chronology
The Troubled Stateside (2006)	Is Dead (2007)	I Was Trying to Describe You to Someone (2010)

Professional ratings
Review scores
Source	Rating
Alternative Press	4.5/5 stars
Punknews.org	4/5 stars
AbsolutePunk.net	(88%)
Rockmidgets.com	4/5 stars

Crime in Stereo Is Dead is the third album by Crime in Stereo, released October 23, 2007. It is their first album on Bridge Nine Records.

== Track listing ==
- All songs written by Crime In Stereo
1. "XXXX (The First Thousand Years of Solitude)" – 2:42
2. "Third Atlantic" – 2:42
3. "...But You are Vast" – 3:22
4. "Animal Pharm" – 3:00
5. "Small Skeletal" – 3:06
6. "Unfortunate Tourists" – 3:38
7. "Nixon" – 3:28
8. "Vicious Teeth" – 3:26
9. "Almost Ghostless/Above the Gathering Oceans" – 2:28
10. "Orbiter" – 3:40
11. "Choker" – 3:32

== Credits ==
- Kristian Hallbert – vocals
- Alex Dunne – guitar
- Mike Musilli – bass
- Scotty Giffin – drums
- Gary Cioni – guitar
- Produced and engineered by Mike Sapone
