= The Turbo A.C.'s =

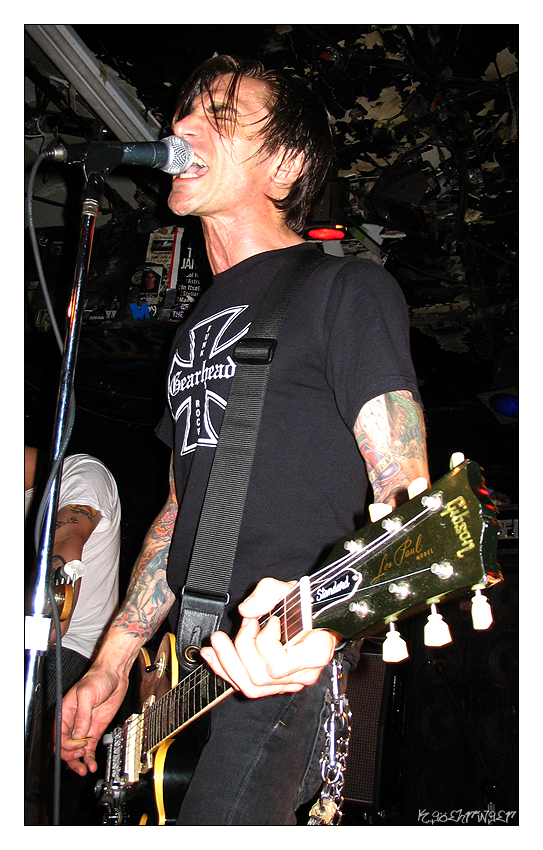

Background information
- Origin: New York City, United States
- Genres: Punk rock
- Years active: 1995–present
- Labels: Blackout; Cacophone; Nitro; Gearhead; Blitzcore
- Members: Kevin Cole; Eric Bhell; Mikey Millionaire; Mikey Montreal
- Past members: Kevin Prunty; Michael Dolan; Jer Von Duck; Tim Lozada
- Website: www.turboacs.com

The Turbo A.C.'s are an American punk rock band from New York City, United States, formed in 1995. The band's high-octane sound has led to comparisons with the likes of The Supersuckers and New Bomb Turks.

== Band history ==
In 1996, the band released their first full-length album, Damnation Overdrive, on New York based hardcore label, Blackout Records. This was followed by releases on Cacophone, Nitro Records and Gearhead Records. The band's catalog features a number of punk personalities producing, including Agnostic Front's Roger Miret and the Dwarves' Blag Dahlia.

The band's name is a reference to the Turnbull A.C.'s, a fictional gang featured briefly in the 1979 Walter Hill film, The Warriors.

They have frequently toured Europe following releases on the German label, Bitzcore Records.

Bassist Mike Dolan left the band in 2005 to start a band in the vein of The Hellacopters and Motörhead called The FTW's.

Drummer Mikey Montreal plays in the Montreal based band The Von Rebels.

Mikey Millionaire also plays in the Newport, Rhode Island based Skinny Millionaires

== Lineup ==
Band members

- Kevin Cole - guitar, vocals
- Mikey Millionaire - guitar, acoustic guitar, vocals
- Eric Bhell - bass, vocals
- Mikey Montreal - drums, vocals

Former members

- Mike Dolan - bass, vocals
- Kevin Prunty - drums, vocals
- Tim Lozada - bass, vocals
- Jer VonDuck - guitar, vocals

== Discography ==
=== Albums ===
- Damnation Overdrive (1996) Blackout! Records
- Winner Take All (1998) Cacophone Records
- Fuel for Life (2001) Nitro Records
- Automatic (2003) Gearhead Records/Bitzcore Records
- Avenue X (2005) Gearhead Records/Bitzcore Records
- Live To Win (2006) Bitzcore Records
- Kill Everyone (2011) Stomp Records
- Radiation (2018) Concrete Jungle Records/Stomp Records

=== Other ===
- "Gonna Get It" 7" (1995)
- Supercharged Straight To Hell (1995, Turbo Titans Records)
- "Eat My Dust" / "Righteous Ruler" 7" (1995, Blackout! Records)
- "Chupacabra!" 7" (1997, Blackout! Records)
- Hellboys/Turbo A.C.'s Split 7" (1997, Explicit Sound Records)
- "Hit & Run" 7" (1999, Into The Vortex)
- "Hit The Road" 10" Picture Disc (1999, Community/Renate Records)
- Clean Split with The Demonics (2000, Radio Blast Records)
