= Posthumous (EP) =

EP by The Banner
- Released: June 15, 2003
- Genre: Hardcore punk
- Length: 16:11
- Label: Blackout Records

The Banner chronology
Posthumous (2003)	Your Murder Mixtape (2003)

Professional ratings
Review scores
Source	Rating
Allmusic	link

Posthumous is a five track EP from the American hardcore punk/metalcore band, The Banner. Originally recorded as the band's first (and unnamed) demo (while the band was still known by their original moniker, Bruce Banner), it was handed out at the band's local shows to fans and attendees. As a result of the popular demo tape, the band won a contract with local New Jersey punk specialist label, Blackout! Records. The demo was then renamed "Posthumous" and re-released as a CD-EP. It was the first of two recordings the band released with Blackout! before leaving for Ferret Music. It was released in June, 2003.

== Overview ==
Debate continues over what genre this band fits into and this EP was probably where it all started. The opening track, "Outgunned", has metal qualities – including Slayer-like riff flourishes, but the vocal style throughout is undeniably hardcore punk.

"Rattlesnakes", "The Screaming", and "Marked For Life", on the other hand are more in the straightforward hardcore punk mould, especially influenced by the New York hardcore subgenre. Fast-paced songs with trademark refrains – commonly referred to as breakdowns. While "The Screaming" does contain a small amount of metal influence, "Marked For Life" is probably more comparable to an early Black Flag track. The EP's closing track, "Trial By Fire", brings all these influences together to form a song which is, in the early part, quite technical metal. It has a mellow, Bane-like interlude in the middle which then breaks out into a typical hardcore punk, complete with background gang chants. Despite the credits, founding members Jon Morozowski (bass) and Paul Jafre (drums) played on this recording.

== Track listing ==
- All songs written by The Banner
1. "Outgunned" – 4:28
2. "Rattlesnakes" – 2:27
3. "The Screaming" – 2:46
4. "Marked For Life" – 2:28
5. "Trial By Fire" – 4:01

== Credits ==
- Joey – vocals
- Garrett – guitar
- Chris – guitar
- Fingerz – bass
- Ian – drums
