= This Glorious Grace =

Live album by Austin Stone Worship
- Released: October 16, 2015
- Recorded: May 9, 2015
- Genre: Worship, CCM
- Length: 66:24

This Glorious Grace is the sixth album from Austin Stone Worship. They released the live album on October 16, 2015.

== Critical reception ==
Professional ratings
Review scores
Source	Rating
New Release Today	4/5 stars
Worship Leader	5/5 stars

Awarding the album five stars at Worship Leader, Jay Akins states, "The collaborative product of the large artist community of songwriters, filmmakers, and musicians at the church, each song on This Glorious Grace has a story of life change through the power of the Gospel. This offering is a rare must-have for your church." Mikayla Shriver, giving the album four stars from New Release Today, writes, "Their latest release, This Glorious Grace, is a live worship album which perfectly reflects the heart of the church's worship ministry...This Glorious Grace is a fantastic live worship album, and this is definitely not the last anyone will hear of Austin Stone Worship." Reviewing the album for Soul-Audio, Andrew Greenhalgh says, "It’s this personal yet universal touch that colors the worship of Austin Stone Worship and which helps take it to the next level."

== Track listing ==
No.	Title	Length
1.	"Center My Life"	5:17
2.	"Trust"	5:26
3.	"You Never Change"	6:35
4.	"You Are God and You Are Good"	7:30
5.	"Jesus True and Only"	6:42
6.	"This Glorious Grace"	6:02
7.	"Gracious Redeemer"	6:04
8.	"How Deep the Father's Love for Us"	4:25
9.	"Everything and Nothing Else"	6:19
10.	"Cornerstone"	6:35
11.	"It Is Well"	5:27
Total length:		66:24

== Chart performance ==
Chart (2015)	Peak position
US Christian Albums (Billboard)	12
US Heatseekers Albums (Billboard)	4
US Independent Albums (Billboard)	30
