= The Troubled Stateside =

Studio album by Crime in Stereo
- Released: April 18, 2006
- Genre: Melodic hardcore
- Length: 36:14
- Label: Nitro
- Producer: Mike Sapone

Crime in Stereo chronology
The Contract (2005)	The Troubled Stateside (2006)	Fuel. Transit. Sleep. (2006)

Professional ratings
Review scores
Source	Rating
AllMusic	4/5 stars

The Troubled Stateside is the second full-length studio album from Long Island melodic hardcore/punk band, Crime in Stereo. It was released in April 2006 by Nitro Records.

== Track listing ==
- All songs written by Crime in Stereo.
1. "Everything Changes/Nothing Is Ever Truly Lost" – 0:59
2. "Bicycles for Afghanistan" – 2:58
3. "Impending Glory of American Adulthood" – 3:25
4. "I'm on the Guestlist Motherfucker" – 1:30
5. "Sudan" – 3:26
6. "Abre los Ojos" – 3:28
7. "Gravity/Grace" – 3:57
8. "Slow Math" – 2:36
9. "I Stole This for You" – 3:02
10. "Dark Island City" – 2:06
11. "For Exes" – 3:26
12. "I, Stateside" – 5:21

== Credits ==
- Kristian Hallbert – vocals
- Alex Dunne – guitar
- Mike Musilli – bass
- Scotty Giffin – drums
- Dan McCabe – background vocals
- Produced and engineered by Mike Sapone
