= Blackout Records =

- Founded: 1988
- Founder: Bill Wilson, Jim Gibson
- Genre: Hardcore punk
- Country of origin: U.S.
- Location: New York City
- Official website: blackoutrecords.com

Blackout! Records is an independent record label which specializes in hardcore punk.

It was formed in 1988 by Bill Wilson and Jim Gibson. In 1989, the label released its album, a New York hardcore compilation album entitled Where the Wild Things Are. The album included tracks from Sheer Terror, Killing Time, and others.

After this first release, Gibson amicably parted company to start his own record label, Noiseville Records. Blackout! continued to release more local hardcore, with EPs from Uppercut and Outburst, and a live single from Sheer Terror. This was followed by a mini album from Crawlpappy and the U.S. edition of the Sheer Terror album Just Can't Hate Enough.

Although the label released a pressing of a greatest hits from UK Oi! band The Business, a reissue of Rest In Pieces debut album, and EPs from The Icemen, American Standard, and Outcrowd, there was a lull in activity during the beginning of the 1990s as the local hardcore scene became more prone to violence – a fact which compounded the temporary demise of one Blackout! band in particular, Killing Time. During this period Wilson established another imprint, Engine Records, which had a more indie rock sound, releasing multiple records, including the acclaimed Fast Japanese Spin Cycle EP from Guided By Voices.

In 1992, Blackout! returned to punk when they chanced upon a female-fronted band, The Goops, playing at CBGB's and decided to release their records. The Goops toured with Rancid and after an appearance in the soundtrack to the Kevin Smith film Mallrats, signed to Kinetic Records, a part of Reprise/Warner Brothers in 1995. During the same time, Sheer Terror signed to MCA Inc. The label also achieved its biggest independent success with the release of the debut album from H_{2}O in 1996. The band subsequently signed to Epitaph Records.

From around 1995 onwards, there was a general explosion of a new wave of hardcore punk – not only on the east coast of America, but also the opposite coast, where Californian labels Indecision Records and Nitro Records started releasing product. Along with Blackout! and Victory Records, they were the main independent punk record labels well into the new millennium.

The label ended the 1990s with records from Killing Time, Kill Your Idols, and East Bay/ Berkeley bands Redemption 87 and Powerhouse. The early part of the 2000s brought some new blood, including Crime In Stereo, NJ's The Banner, The Procedure, and The Commercials. The last official Blackout! release was The Fire Still Burns in 2005. Although no longer releasing new music, the label still maintains a blog at its website which is infrequently updated and has the catalog available digitally on Amazon, iTunes, eMusic, Rhapsody, and other major digital outlets through The Orchard.

In 2016 the label released "The Bulldog Box", a five LP box set of Sheer Terror LPs, demos, and unheard early recordings. In 2019, Blackout! announced an expanded vinyl re-issues from Kill Your Idols, Outburst, and Killing Time on their Instagram feed. An Outburst covers compilation, entitled Hot Shit Attitude, featuring current bands including Power Trip and Higher Power covering their favorite Outburst tracks, was released in January 2020.

== Roster ==
- American Standard
- At a Loss
- Awkward Thought
- Bivouac (Engine Records)
- Blind Society
- Buzz Hungry (Engine Records)
- Breakdown
- Crawlpappy
- Crime In Stereo
- Deadguy (Engine Records)
- Dish (Engine Records)
- Ensign
- Guided By Voices (Engine Records)
- H_{2}O
- Kill Your Idols
- Killing Time
- M.O.D.
- Outcrowd
- Outburst
- Plow United
- Powerhouse
- Protagonist
- Redemption 87
- Shadow Agency
- Sheer Terror
- Sweet Diesel (Engine Records)
- The Banner
- The Commercials
- The Escaped
- The Fire Still Burns
- The Goops
- The Icemen
- The Procedure
- The Turbo A.C.'s
- Uppercut
- Violent Society

== Compilation Roster ==
- No Brain (feat members of The Ramones, Sheer Terror, and Rancid)
- The Swingin' Utters
- The Bouncing Souls
- Waterdog
- 88 Fingers Louie
- Murphy's Law
- Trusty
- Brody
- Jughead's Revenge
- Black Velvet Flag
- Plow United
- Sublime
- Leeway

== See also ==
- List of record labels
