= Hatebreed discography =

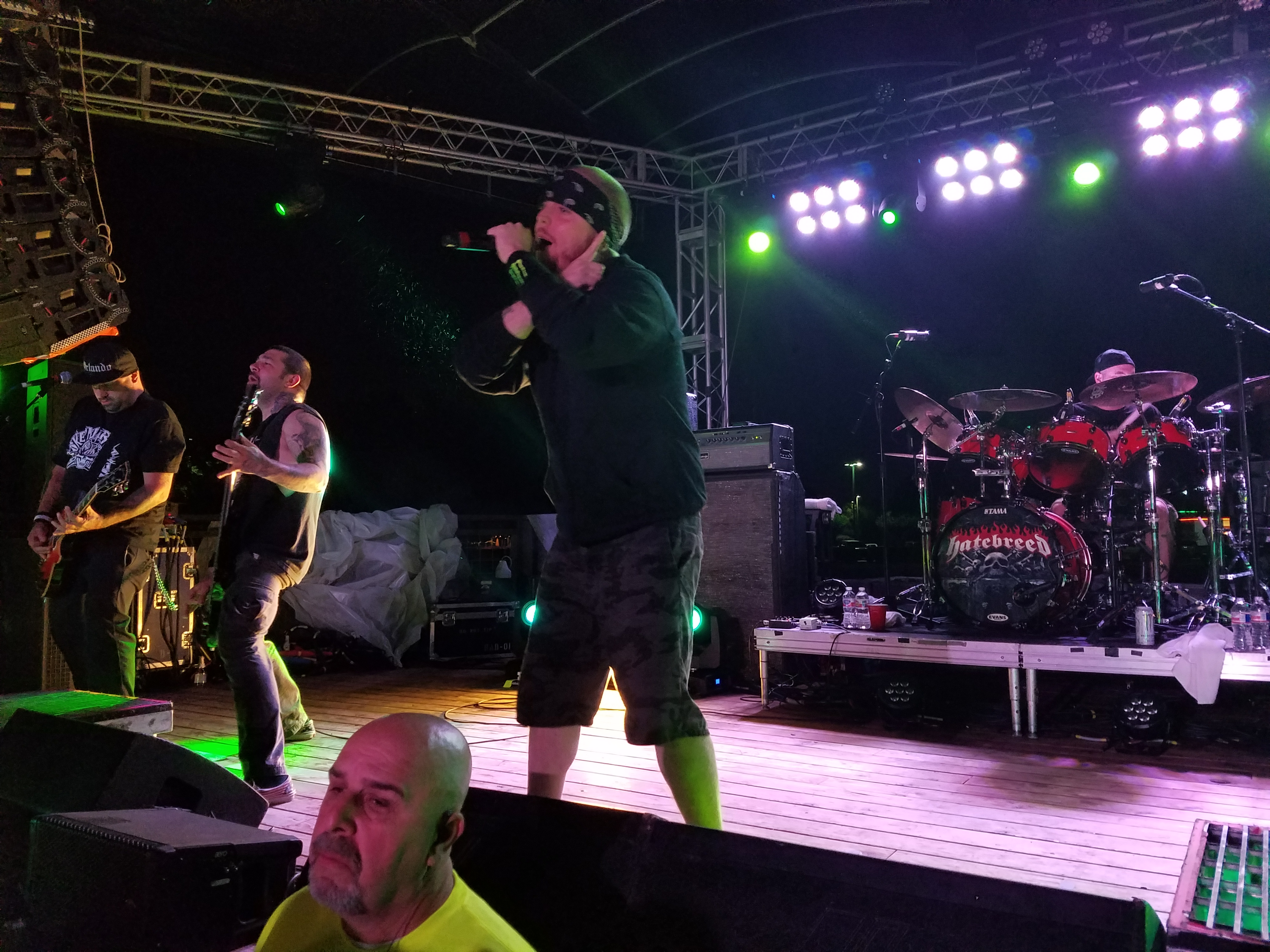
- Hatebreed performing in 2016
- Studio albums: 9
- Extended plays: 3
- Singles: 8
- Video albums: 1
- Music videos: 18
- Cover albums: 1

The discography of American metalcore band Hatebreed consists of nine studio albums, one cover album, one video album, three extended plays, eight singles and eighteen music videos. They have sold over 1.5 million records in North America. Hatebreed was formed in 1994 in Bridgeport, Connecticut. The group released 3 EPs from 1995 to 1997 including Under the Knife. They then signed with Victory Records to release their debut album Satisfaction Is the Death of Desire in 1997. The group then signed with the major label Universal for their next two albums. The first was Perseverance which was released in 2002 and became their first to reach the Billboard 200, peaking at number 50.

The following year they released The Rise of Brutality, which debuted at number 30 on the Billboard 200. Their song "Live for This" was nominated for a Best Metal Performance at the Grammys in 2005. The group then signed to Roadrunner Records to release their fourth studio album Supremacy in 2006. The album peaked at number 31 on the Billboard 200, and became their first to chart in multiple other countries.

Hatebreed then signed to eOne to release a self-titled album in 2009, which debuted at number 37 on the Billboard 200. They then signed with another new label Razor and Tie to release their sixth album The Divinity of Purpose in 2013. The album became their best performing commercially, peaking at number 20 on the Billboard 200, along with topping the US Top Hard Rock Charts. It also peaked in the top 40 in several European countries.

They signed with Nuclear Blast to release The Concrete Confessional in 2016, which debuted at number 25 on the Billboard 200, and peaked even higher in four European countries, with the highest being number 17 in Germany. Their eighth album Weight of the False Self was released in 2020 and peaked the highest in Germany at number 36.

== Albums ==
=== Studio albums ===
List of studio albums, with selected chart positions
Title	Album details	Peak chart positions										Sales
Title	Album details	US	US Hard Rock	AUS	AUT	BEL (FL)	FRA	GER	NLD	SWI	UK	Sales
Satisfaction Is the Death of Desire	Released: November 11, 1997 (US); Label: Victory; Formats: CD, LP, digital download	—	—	—	—	—	—	—	—	—	—	US: 190,000
Perseverance	Released: March 26, 2002 (US); Label: Universal; Formats: CD, digital download	50	—	—	—	—	—	—	—	—	195	US: 250,000+
The Rise of Brutality	Released: October 28, 2003 (US); Label: Universal; Formats: CD, digital download	30	—	—	—	—	—	—	—	—	—	US: 150,000+
Supremacy	Released: August 29, 2006 (US); Label: Roadrunner; Formats: CD, digital download	31	—	32	64	89	112	52	—	95	101	US: 100,000+
Hatebreed	Released: September 29, 2009 (US); Label: eOne; Formats: CD, digital download	37	8	68	60	50	156	45	73	—	163	US: 24,000+
The Divinity of Purpose	Released: January 29, 2013 (US); Label: Razor & Tie; Formats: CD, digital download	20	1	—	28	38	—	25	86	40	144	US: 55,000+
The Concrete Confessional	Released: May 13, 2016 (US); Label: Nuclear Blast; Formats: CD, digital download	25	2	33	23	22	138	17	92	20	78	
Weight of the False Self	Released: November 27, 2020 (US); Label: Nuclear Blast; Formats: CD, digital download	—	12	—	—	49	—	36	—	—	—	
Fatal Paradox	Released: November 6, 2026 (US); Label: BlkIIBlk; Formats: CD, digital download	—	—	—	43	173	—	22	—	41	—	
"—" denotes a recording that did not chart or was not released in that territory.

=== Cover albums ===
List of cover albums
Title	Album details
For the Lions	Released: May 5, 2009 (US); Label: Koch; Formats: CD, LP, digital download

=== Video albums ===
List of video albums
Title	Album details	Peak chart positions
Title	Album details	US Video
Live Dominance	Released: September 2, 2008 (US); Label: eOne; Formats: DVD	1

== Extended plays ==
List of extended plays
Title	EP details
Hatebreed / Neglect (with Neglect)	Released: 1995 (US); Label: Stillborn; Formats: 7"
Under the Knife	Released: November 13, 1996 (US); Label: Smorgasbord; Formats: CD, 7", digital download
Hatebreed / Integrity (with Integrity)	Released: 1997 (US); Label: Stillborn; Formats: 7"

== Singles ==
List of singles, showing year released and album name
Title	Year	Album
"I Will Be Heard"	2002	Perseverance
"This Is Now"	2003	The Rise of Brutality
"Defeatist"	2006	Supremacy
"Ghosts of War"	2009	For the Lions
"Escape"	2009	For the Lions
"In Ashes They Shall Reap"	2009	Hatebreed
"Put It to the Torch"	2012	The Divinity of Purpose
"When the Blade Drops"	2020	Non-album single

== Music videos ==
List of music videos, showing year released and director
Title	Year	Director(s)
"Before Dishonor"	1997	—N/a
"Worlds Apart"	1998	—N/a
"I Will Be Heard"	2002	Marc Webb
"Perseverance"	2002	Dale Resteghini
"This Is Now"	2003	Dale Resteghini
"Live for This"	2003	Dale Resteghini
"To the Threshold"	2006	Dale Resteghini
"Defeatist"	2006	Dale Resteghini
"Destroy Everything"	2007	Martin Kame
"Never Let It Die"	2008	Martin Kame
"Ghosts of War"	2009	Kevin James Custer
"Thirsty and Miserable"	2009	Kevin James Custer
"In Ashes They Shall Reap"	2009	Dale Resteghini
"Everyone Bleeds Now"	2010	Martin Kame
"Put It to the Torch"	2012	Justin Reich
"Honor Never Dies"	2013	Blake & Nic
"Looking Down the Barrel of Today"	2016	David Brodsky
"Something's Off"	2016	David Brodsky
