= Zeuss =

American record producer (born 1972)

- Born: Christopher Harris; April 1, 1972 (age 54)
- Genres: Hardcore punk; heavy metal; punk rock; groove metal; death metal; post-hardcore; indie rock; alternative rock; power metal; progressive metal
- Occupations: Producer; Engineer; Mixer; Songwriter; Composer; Musician
- Years active: 1996–present
- Website: zeussproducer.com

Christopher Harris (born April 1, 1972), known professionally as Chris "Zeuss" Harris or simply Zeuss, is an American record producer.

== Biography ==
Zeuss is best known in the worlds of hard rock, heavy metal music, hardcore punk, and metalcore. He has engineered, produced, mixed, and mastered albums by a number of high-profile acts, including Rob Zombie, Queensrÿche, Demon Hunter, Suicide Silence, Suffocation, Municipal Waste, Soulfly, Chimaira, Throwdown, Whitechapel, Bleeding Through, Kataklysm, and God Forbid. He’s made over a half dozen records each with Shadows Fall (including the band’s most commercially successful album, The War Within) and Hatebreed. His relationship with Hatebreed extends to affiliated projects, including Kingdom of Sorrow, Jasta, and numerous artists signed to singer Jamey Jasta's Stillborn Records. Zeuss owns Planet Z Recording Studios in Massachusetts, where many of the records he has produced were mixed or recorded.

Rob Zombie, Joey Jordison, and Max Cavalera are among the musicians who have complimented Zeuss in the press.

== Discography ==
Year	Band/Artist	Album title	Record label	Role	Billboard 200	Award
2000	100 Demons	In the Eyes of the Lord	Good Life Recordings	Producer, Mixing		
2000	Shadows Fall	Of One Blood	Century Media Records	Producer, Engineer, Mixing		
2001	God Forbid	Determination	Century Media Records	Co-producer, Engineer		
2002	All That Remains	Behind Silence and Solitude	Metal Blade Records	Producer, Engineer, Mixing		
2002	Sworn Enemy	Integrity Defines Strength (EP)	Stillborn Records	Engineer, Mixing		
2002	Hatebreed	Perseverance	Universal Music Group	Engineer	50	
2002	Shadows Fall	The Art of Balance	Century Media Records	Producer, Engineer, Mixing		
2003	Hatebreed	The Rise of Brutality	Universal Music Group	Producer, Engineer	30	Grammy Award (Nominated)
2003	Blood Has Been Shed	Spirals	Ferret Music	Producer, Engineer, Mixing		
2003	Sworn Enemy	As Real as It Gets	Elektra Records	Producer, Engineer, Mixing		
2004	Agnostic Front	Another Voice	Nuclear Blast	Co-producer, Engineer, Mixing		
2004	Full Blown Chaos	Wake the Demons	Stillborn Records	Producer, Engineer, Mixing		
2004	The Autumn Offering	Revelations of the Unsung	Stillborn Records	Engineer, Mixing		
2004	100 Demons	100 Demons	Deathwish Inc.	Producer, Engineer, Mixing		
2004	Shadows Fall	The War Within	Century Media Records	Producer, Engineer, Mixing	20	Grammy Award (Nominated)
2005	Throwdown	Vendetta	Trustkill Records	Producer, Engineer, Mixing	156	
2005	Roger Miret and the Disasters	1984	Hellcat Records	Engineer, Mixing		
2005	Hell Within	Asylum of the Human Predator	Lifeforce Records	Mixing		
2005	Madball	Legacy	Ferret Music	Producer, Engineer, Mixing		
2005	The Red Chord	Clients	Metal Blade Records	Producer, Engineer, Mixing		
2006	Shadows Fall	Fallout from the War	Century Media Records	Producer, Engineer, Mixing	83	
2006	Shai Hulud	Hearts Once Nourished with Hope and Compassion	Revelation Records	Re-mixing		
2006	Demiricous	One (Hellbound)	Metal Blade Records	Producer, Engineer, Mixing		
2006	Hatebreed	Supremacy	Roadrunner Records	Producer, Engineer, Mixing	31	
2006	Remembering Never	God Save Us	Ferret Music	Producer, Engineer, Mixing		
2006	Terror	Always the Hard Way	Trustkill Records	Producer, Engineer, Mixing		
2006	Sworn Enemy	The Beginning of the End	Abacus Recordings	Mixing		
2006	Icepick	Violent Epiphany	Stillborn Records	Producer, Engineer, Mixing, Mastering		
2007	Emmure	Goodbye to the Gallows	Victory Records	Producer, Engineer, Mixing	191	
2007	Municipal Waste	The Art of Partying	Earache Records	Producer, Engineer, Mixing		
2007	Agnostic Front	Warriors	Nuclear Blast	Co-producer, Engineer, Mixing		
2007	Shadows Fall	Threads of Life	Atlantic Records	Mixing	46	Grammy Award (Nominated)
2007	Sanctity	Road to Bloodshed	Roadrunner Records	Mixing on tracks 7, 11, 12		
2007	Thy Will Be Done	Was and Is to Come	Stillborn Records	Producer, Engineer, Mixing		
2007	Ion Dissonance	Minus the Herd	Abacus Recordings	Producer, Engineer, Mixing		
2007	Madball	Infiltrate the System	Ferret Music	Producer, Engineer, Mixing		
2007	Her Nightmare	Come Anarchy Come Ruin	Resist Records	Producer, Engineer, Mixing, Mastering		
2007	3 Inches of Blood	Fire Up the Blades	Roadrunner Records	Mixing	147	
2008	Emmure	The Respect Issue	Victory Records	Producer, Engineer, Mixing	141	
2008	Kingdom of Sorrow	Kingdom of Sorrow	Relapse Records	Co-producer, Engineer, Mixing	131	
2008	With Blood Comes Cleansing	Horror	Victory Records	Producer, Engineer, Mixing		
2008	Arsis	We Are the Nightmare	Nuclear Blast	Producer, Engineer, Mixing		
2008	Stick to Your Guns	Comes from the Heart	Century Media Records	Producer, Engineer, Mixing		
2008	Whitechapel	This Is Exile	Metal Blade Records	Mixing, Mastering	118	
2008	Vinnie Stigma	New York Blood	I Scream Records	Mixing		
2008	The Acacia Strain	Continent	Prosthetic Records	Producer, Engineer, Mixing	107	
2008	Terror	The Damned, the Shamed	Century Media Records	Producer, Engineer, Mixing		
2008	Carnifex	The Diseased and the Poisoned	Victory Records	Producer, Engineer, Mixing		
2009	Chimaira	The Infection	Ferret Music	Mixing	30	
2009	The Red Chord	Fed Through the Teeth Machine	Metal Blade Records	Mixing, Mastering		
2009	Hatebreed	Hatebreed	Entertainment One Music	Producer, Engineer, Mixing	37	
2009	Throwdown	Deathless	Entertainment One Music	Mixing		OC Music Awards (Nominated)
2009	Thy Will Be Done	In Ancient of Days	Stillborn Records	Producer, Engineer, Mixing, Mastering		
2009	Born of Osiris	A Higher Place	Sumerian Records	Producer, Engineer	73	
2009	Hatebreed	For the Lions	Entertainment One Music	Mixing	58	
2009	Municipal Waste	Massive Aggressive	Earache Records	Producer, Engineer, Mixing		
2009	Shadows Fall	Retribution	Everblack Industries	Producer, Engineer, Mixing	35	
2009	Impending Doom	The Serpent Servant	Facedown Records	Mixing, Mastering		
2009	Neaera	Omnicide – Creation Unleashed	Metal Blade Records	Mixing, Mastering		
2009	Too Pure To Die	Confess	Trustkill Records	Co-producer, engineer, mixing		
2010	The Acacia Strain	Wormwood	Prosthetic Records	Producer, Engineer, Mixing, Mastering	67	
2010	Legend	Valediction	Rise Records	Producer, Engineer, Mixing, Mastering		
2010	Arsis	Starve for the Devil	Nuclear Blast	Producer, Engineer, Mixing, Mastering		
2010	Oceano	Contagion	Earache Records	Producer, Engineer, Mixing, Mastering	163	
2010	Bleeding Through	Bleeding Through	Rise Records	Producer, Engineer, Mixing, Mastering	143	
2010	Kingdom of Sorrow	Behind the Blackest Tears	Relapse Records	Mixing, Mastering	151	
2010	Murderdolls	Women and Children Last	Roadrunner Records	Producer, Engineer, Mixing	42	
2010	Baptized in Blood	Baptized in Blood	Roadrunner Records	Producer, Engineer, Mixing	143	
2011	Chimaira	The Age of Hell	Entertainment One Music	Mixing, Mastering	54	
2011	Suicide Silence	The Black Crown	Century Media Records	Mixing, Mastering	28	
2011	Crowbar	Sever the Wicked Hand	Entertainment One Music	Mixing, Mastering		
2011	Ten Tonn Hammer	Your Words Are Nothing	FONO ltd Records	Mixing, Mastering		
2011	Texas In July	One Reality	Equal Vision Records	Producer, Engineer, Mixing, Mastering	174	
2011	Earth Crisis	Neutralize the Threat	Century Media Records	Producer, Engineer, Mixing, Mastering		
2011	Chelsea Grin	My Damnation	Artery Recordings	Producer, Engineer, Mixing, Mastering	64	
2011	Threat Signal	Threat Signal	Nuclear Blast	Producer, Engineer, Mixing, Mastering		
2011	Thy Will Be Done	Temple (EP)	Eye.On Lion Recordings	Engineer, Mixing		
2012	MyChildren MyBride	Mychildren Mybride	Solid State Records	Producer, Engineer, Mixing, Mastering	183	
2012	War of Ages	Return to Life	Facedown Records	Producer, Engineer, Mixing, Mastering	155	
2012	A Bullet for Pretty Boy	Symbiosis	Razor & Tie, Artery Recordings	Producer, Engineer, Mixing, Mastering		
2012	The Casualties	Resistance	Season of Mist	Producer, Engineer, Mixing, Mastering		
2012	Revocation	Teratogenesis (EP)	Scion A/V	Producer, Engineer, Mixing, Mastering		
2012	Soulfly	Enslaved	Roadrunner Records	Producer, Engineer, Mixing, Mastering	82	
2012	Arsis	Lepers Caress (EP)	Scion A/V	Mixing, mastering		
2013	Scar the Martyr	Scar the Martyr	Roadrunner Records	Mixing	129	
2013	Kataklysm	Waiting for the End to Come	Nuclear Blast	Mixing, mastering		Juno Awards (Nominated)
2013	Rob Zombie	Venomous Rat Regeneration Vendor	T-Boy Records	Engineer, (assistant), Programming	7	
2013	Howl	Bloodlines	Relapse Records	Producer, Engineer, Mixing, Mastering		
2013	Six Feet Under	Unborn	Metal Blade Records	Mixing, Mastering		
2013	Generation Kill	We're All Gonna Die	Nuclear Blast	Producer, Engineer, Mixing, Mastering		
2013	Huntress	Starbound Beast	Napalm Records	Producer, Engineer, Mixing, Mastering		
2013	Hatebreed	The Divinity of Purpose	Razor & Tie	Co-producer, Engineer	20	
2013	Suffocation	Pinnacle of Bedlam	Nuclear Blast	Mixing, Mastering	152	
2014	Devil You Know	The Beauty of Destruction	Nuclear Blast	Mixing	45	
2014	Crowbar	Symmetry in Black	Entertainment One Music	Mastering	68	
2014	Earth Crisis	Salvation of Innocents	Candlelight Records	Mixing, Mastering		
2014	Throwdown	Intolerance	Entertainment One Music	Mixing, Mastering	142	
2014	Demon Hunter	Extremist	Solid State Records	Mixing	16	Dove Award (Won)
2014	Marty Friedman	Inferno	Prosthetic Records	Engineer (additional)		
2014	Sanctuary	The Year the Sun Died	Century Media Records	Producer, Engineer, Mixing, Mastering	125	
2014	Revocation	Deathless	Metal Blade Records	Producer, Engineer, Mixing	124	
2014	Hammercult	Steelcrusher	Sonic Attack Records	Mixing, Mastering		
2014	Rise of the Northstar	Welcame	Nuclear Blast	Mixing, Mastering		
2015	Rob Zombie	Spookshow International (Live)	T-Boy Records	Mixing	118	
2015	Vision of Disorder	Razed to the Ground	Candlelight Records	Producer, Engineer, Mixing, Mastering		
2015	Act of Defiance	Birth and the Burial	Metal Blade Records	Engineer, Mixing, Mastering		
2015	Queensrÿche	Condition Hüman	Century Media Records	Producer, Engineer, Mixing, Mastering	27	
2016	Rob Zombie	The Electric Warlock Acid Witch Satanic Orgy Celebration Dispenser	T-Boy Records	Producer, Engineer, Mixing	6	
2016	Hatebreed	The Concrete Confessional	Nuclear Blast	Producer, engineer, mastering	25	
2016	Armageddon	Parallels and Introspection	Independent	Mastering		
2016	Revocation	Great Is Our Sin	Metal Blade Records	Producer, Engineer, Mixing, Mastering	189	
2017	Demon Hunter	Outlive	Solid State Records	Mixing	25	
2017	Forgotten Tomb	We Owe You Nothing	Agonia Records	Mixing, Mastering		
2017	Wednesday 13	Condolences	Nuclear Blast	Producer, Engineer, Mixing, Mastering		
2017	Witherfall	Nocturnes and Requiems	Century Media Records	Mixing, Mastering		
2017	Suffocation	...Of the Dark Light	Nuclear Blast	Mixing, Mastering		
2017	Bloodclot!	Up In Arms	Metal Blade Records	Producer, Engineer		
2017	Six Feet Under	Torment	Metal Blade Records	Mixing, Mastering		
2017	Sanctuary	Inception	Century Media Records	Mixing, Mastering		
2017	Iced Earth	Incorruptible	Century Media Records	Engineer, Mixing, Mastering		
2018	Marc Rizzo	Rotation	Combat Records	Producer, Engineer, Mixing, Mastering		
2018	Witherfall	A Prelude to Sorrow	Century Media Records	Mixing, Mastering		
2018	Dee Snider	For the Love of Metal	Napalm Records	Mastering		
2018	Purgatory	Jon Schaffer's Purgatory	Century Media Records	Mastering		
2018	Revocation	The Outer Ones	Metal Blade Records	Producer, Engineer, Mixing, Mastering		
2019	Incite	Built to Destroy	Minus Head Records	Mastering		
2019	Overkill	The Wings of War	Nuclear Blast	Mixing, Mastering		
2019	Death Before Dishonor	Unfinished Business	Bridge 9 Records	Producer, Engineer, Mixing, Mastering		
2019	Demon Hunter	Peace	Solid State Records	Mixing, Mastering		Dove Award (Nominated)
2019	Demon Hunter	War	Solid State Records	Mixing, Mastering		Dove Award (Nominated)
2019	Heathen	The Evolution Of Chaos	Mascot Records	Remaster		
2019	Queensrÿche	The Verdict	Century Media	Producer, Engineer, Mixing, Mastering		
2019	Demons & Wizards	Demons & Wizards	Century Media	Remaster		
2019	Demons & Wizards	Touched By The Crimson King	Century Media	Remaster		
2019	Disciple	Love Letter Kill Shot	Tooth And Nail	Mixing, Mastering		Dove Award (Nominated)
2019	Witherfall	Vintage EP	Century Media Records	Mixing, Mastering		
2020	Heathen	Empire Of The Blind	Nuclear Blast	Producer, Engineer, Mixing, Mastering		
2020	Raven	Metal City	SPV/Steamhammer	Mixing, Mastering		
2020	Black Veil Brides	Re-Stitch These Wounds	Sumerian Records	Mastering		
2020	Sanctuary	Into The Mirror Black (30th Anniversary)	Century Media Records	Remaster		
2020	Sanctuary	Black Reflections (Live 1990)	Century Media Records	Mixing, Mastering		
2020	Iced Earth	Iced Earth (30th Anniversary)	Century Media Records	Remixing, Mastering		
2020	Hatebreed	Weight Of The False Self	Nuclear Blast	Producer, Engineer, Mixing, Mastering		
2021	Rob Zombie	The Lunar Injection Kool Aid Eclipse Conspiracy	Nuclear Blast	Producer, Engineer, Mixing, Mastering		Grammy Award (Nominated)
2021	Angelus Apatrida	Angelus Apatrida	Century Media Records	Mixing, Mastering		
2021	Cruel Hand	Darkside of the Cage	Static Era Records	Producer, Engineer, Mixing, Mastering		
2021	Todd La Torre	Rejoice in the Suffering	Rat Pak Records	Mixing, Mastering		
2021	The Letter Black	The Letter Black	Rockfest Records	Mixing, Mastering		
2021	Mammothor	The Ecstasy of Silence...The Agony of Dreams	American Overdrive	Mixing, Mastering		
2021	Spirit Adrift	Forge Your Future	Century Media Records	Mixing, Mastering		
2021	Twiztid	Unlikely Prescription	Majik Ninja Entertainment	Mastering		
2022	Spirit Adrift	20 Centuries Gone	Century Media Records	Mixing, Mastering		
2022	Queensrÿche	Digital Noise Alliance	Century Media Records	Producer, Engineer, Mixing, Mastering		
2022	Demon Hunter	Exile	Weapons MFG	Mastering		
2023	Spirit Adrift	Ghost at the Gallows	Century Media Records	Mixing, Mastering		
2023	Death Before Dishonor	Master of None	Bridge 9 Records	Producer, Engineer, Mixing, Mastering		
2023	Angelus Apatrida	Aftermath	Century Media Records	Mixing, Mastering		
2023	Slighted	This Means War	Static Era Records	Mixing, Mastering		
2023	Mammothor	Lies By Omission	American Overdrive	Mixing, Mastering		
2023	Throwdown	Haymaker XX	Pit Viper Records	Remastering		
2023	Demon Hunter	"Some of Us"	Weapons MFG	Mixing, Mastering		
2024	Whip	Whip, Vol. 1	Rat Pak Records	Mixing, Mastering		
2024	Puya	Potencial	In Grooves	Mixing, Mastering		
2024	Witherfall	Sounds of the Forgotten	Deathwave Records	Producer, Engineer, Mixing, Mastering		
2024	Twiztid	Welcome to Your Funeral	Majik Ninja Entertainment	Producer, Engineer, Mixing, Mastering		
2024	QAALM	First Light of the Last Dawn	Hypaethral Records	Mixing, Mastering		
2024	Life Cycles	Portal to the Unknown	1126 Records	Mixing, Mastering		
2024	Smoke AxD	Vaya Con Dio's	Static Era, Blackout Records	Producer, Engineer, Mixing, Mastering		
2025	Demon Hunter	There Was a Light Here	Weapons MFG	Mixing, Mastering		
2025	Hollow Leg	Dust and Echoes	Third House	Mixing, Mastering		
2025	Heathen	Bleed The World Live	Nuclear Blast Records	Mixing, Mastering		
2025	Death Before Dishonor	Nowhere Bound	Bridge 9 Records	Producer, Engineer, Mixing, Mastering		
2025	Agnostic Front	Echoes In Eternity	Reigning Phoenix Music	Mixing, Mastering		
2026	Rob Zombie	The Great Satan	Nuclear Blast Records	Producer, Engineer, Mixing, Mastering	59	
2026	Metal Church	Dead To Rights	Rat Pak Records	Mixing, Mastering		
2026	Spirit Adrift	Infinite Illumination	20 Buck Spin	Mixing, Mastering		
2026	Anthrax	Cursum Perficio	Megaforce, Nuclear Blast	Additional Engineering		
2026	Accept	Teutonic Titans 1976-2026	Napalm Records	Producer, Engineer, Mixing, Mastering		
2026	Transformers	The Transformers -The Movie Soundtrack-The Reformatted Edition	Reigning Phoenix Music	Mixing, Mastering		
2026	Hatebreed	Fatal Paradox	BlkIIBlk Records	Producer, Recording, Mixing, Mastering		
2027	Heathen	Lifetime in Hell	Napalm Records	Producer, Mixing, Mastering		

== Filmography ==
Film	Director	Studio	Distributor	Role	Year
31	Rob Zombie	Saban Entertainment	Saban Entertainment	Music by	2016
3 from Hell	Rob Zombie	Saban Entertainment	Lionsgate	Music by	2019
The Munsters	Rob Zombie	Universal 1440 Entertainment	Universal 1440 Entertainment	Music by	2022
