= Under the Knife (EP) =

EP by Hatebreed
- Released: November 13, 1996
- Recorded: 1995
- Genre: Metalcore; hardcore punk
- Length: 14:25
- Label: Smorgasbord

Hatebreed chronology
Split 7" w/ Integrity (1995)	Under the Knife (1996)	Satisfaction Is the Death of Desire (1997)

Under the Knife is an EP by American metalcore band Hatebreed, released in 1996 by Smorgasbord Records as their second EP release. It consists of the band's first 7 inch release, also titled Under the Knife, as well as three additional demo tracks. It was re-released several times, in 1998 by Smorgasbord Records, in 2000 by both Smorgasbord Records and Victory Records and in 2006 by Cortex Records.

The 7" vinyl only has the four first tracks, but the CD has all 7 tracks.

== Track listing ==
1. Smash Your Enemies – 2:12
2. Kill an Addict – 1:02
3. Under the Knife – 1:33
4. Filth – 1:42
5. Not One Truth – 2:09
6. Severed – 2:40
7. Puritan – 3:07

== Pressing information ==
500 copies with black vinyl with a limited edition photocopied cover, 6,000 Black vinyl, 200 Green vinyl, 200 Gold vinyl, 500 White vinyl, 300 Red vinyl, 300 Blue vinyl, and 500 Orange Vinyl.

== Re-recordings ==
Every track, except for "Under the Knife", has been re-recorded and included on another Hatebreed album:

- "Not One Truth" and "Puritan" were included on Hatebreed's 1997 full-length Satisfaction Is the Death of Desire.
- "Smash Your Enemies" was re-recorded for the 2002 release Perseverance.
- In 2005, "Severed" was re-recorded and added as a bonus track for the UK release of Supremacy.
- "Kill an Addict" and "Filth" were iTunes exclusive tracks for the special edition of Hatebreed's self-titled album in 2009. This special edition is no longer available on iTunes.

== Personnel ==
- Jamey Jasta – vocals
- Larry Dwyer Jr. – rhythm guitar
- Wayne Lozinak – lead guitar
- Chris Beattie – bass
- Dave Russo – drums
