= For the Love of Metal =

Studio album by Dee Snider
- Released: July 27, 2018
- Studio: Dexter's Lab Recording
- Genre: Heavy metal
- Length: 41:26
- Label: Napalm
- Producer: Jamey Jasta; Nicky Bellmore

Dee Snider chronology
We Are the Ones (2016)	For the Love of Metal (2018)

Singles from Dee Snider
- 1. "Tomorrow's No Concern" Released: 2018; 2. "Become the Storm" Released: 2018; 3. "I am the Hurricane" Released: 2018

For the Love of Metal is the fourth solo studio album by Dee Snider, released in 2018 by Napalm Records. It was recorded by Nick Bellmore at Dexter's Lab Recording in Milford, Connecticut. It was produced by Jamey Jasta.

== Background ==
On For the Love of Metal, many guest musicians were involved in the songwriting. It features writing and additional performances by musicians like Howard Jones (Light the Torch, ex-Killswitch Engage), Mark Morton (Lamb of God), Alissa White-Gluz (Arch Enemy), Joel Grind and Nick Bellmore (Toxic Holocaust), Charlie Bellmore (Kingdom of Sorrow) and Tanya O'Callaghan.

In January 2018, Snider's mother died two months after being struck by a car, while the album was being recorded. He sings about her and dealing with mortality in the track "I'm Ready".

Music videos were released for the tracks "Tomorrow's No Concern" and "Become the Storm". A lyric video was released for "I am the Hurricane".

== Reception ==
Professional ratings
Review scores
Source	Rating
Blabbermouth	8.5/10
Sonic Perspectives	7.5/10

For the Love of Metal received generally positive reviews upon its release. Despite including some "old-school tones" Dee Snider "carries his weight" in the modern era of metal, and has no trouble staying relevant. Snider uses this album to expand his career into other sub-genres of metal and "explore new grounds".

== Track listing ==
CD
No.	Title	Music	Length
1.	"Lies Are a Business"	Charlie Bellmore, Nicky Bellmore, Joel Grind, Jamey Jasta	2:46
2.	"Tomorrow's No Concern"	Charlie Bellmore, Nicky Bellmore, Jamey Jasta	3:19
3.	"I Am the Hurricane"	Nicky Bellmore, Jamey Jasta, Howard Jones, Mark Morton	3:25
4.	"American Made"	Charlie Bellmore, Nicky Bellmore, Jamey Jasta	3:34
5.	"Roll Over You"	Charlie Bellmore, Jamey Jasta	2:55
6.	"I'm Ready"	Charlie Bellmore, Nicky Bellmore, Oliver Herbert, Jamey Jasta	3:18
7.	"Running Mazes"	Charlie Bellmore, Nicky Bellmore, Jamey Jasta	2:57
8.	"Mask"	Charlie Bellmore, Nicky Bellmore, Jamey Jasta, John Moyer	3:48
9.	"Become the Storm"	Charlie Bellmore, Nicky Bellmore, Jamey Jasta	4:10
10.	"The Hardest Way"	Jamey Jasta, Logan Mader, John Moyer	3:47
11.	"Dead Hearts (Love Thy Enemy)"	Charlie Bellmore, Nicky Bellmore, Jamey Jasta, Jesse Ketive	3:53
12.	"For the Love of Metal"	Charlie Bellmore, Nicky Bellmore, Jamey Jasta	3:28

== Personnel ==
Primary musicians

- Dee Snider – vocals
- Charlie Bellmore – guitars, bass
- Nicky Bellmore – drums

Additional musicians

- Tanya O'Callaghan – bass ("Roll Over You" and "The Hardest Way")
- Joey Concepcion – guest guitar Solo ("I'm Ready")
- Howard Jones – guest vocals ("The Hardest Way")
- Alissa White-Gluz – guest vocals ("Dead Hearts (Love Thy Enemy)")

== Charts ==
Chart (2020)	Peak position
Austrian Albums (Ö3 Austria)	65
German Albums (Offizielle Top 100)	26
Hungarian Albums (MAHASZ)	26
Swiss Albums (Schweizer Hitparade)	16
