= Fatal Paradox =

Studio album by Hatebreed
- Released: November 6, 2026
- Genres: Metalcore; hardcore punk
- Length: 35:10
- Label: BLKIIBLK
- Producer: Zeuss

Hatebreed chronology
Weight of the False Self (2020)	Fatal Paradox (2026)

Singles from Fatal Paradox
- 1. "Make the Demons Obey" Released: July 21, 2025; 2. "Kill Count Increase" Released: June 21, 2026; 3. "Fatal Paradox" Released: August 26, 2026; 4. "The Carrion Choir" Released: September 30, 2026; 5. "Decisions Become Destinies" Released: November 4, 2026

Fatal Paradox is the ninth studio album by American metalcore band Hatebreed, released on November 6, 2026, through BLKIIBLK Records. This is the band's first album since Weight of the False Self (2020), marking the longest gap between two studio albums in their career, and the first to not feature founding bassist Chris Beattie.

== Background and recording ==
As early as 2023, Hatebreed began working on new material for their ninth studio album. On November 13, 2024, it was announced Hatebreed split from founding member and bass player Chris Beattie. In a 2025 interview, Beattie stated it was "completely unexpected." Adding "it was not my decision to leave the band. Someone saw an opportunity to get me out of the picture, and that's where I am now." Beattie's departure along with guitarist Wayne Lozinak recovery from a brain tumour in 2025, resulted in the six year gap between Weight of the False Self and Fatal Paradox.

On July 21, 2025, Hatebreed released new music for the first time in five years with the single "Make the Demons Obey". On June 11, 2026, it was announced the band had signed with BLKIIBLK Records to release their ninth studio album, on June 21, Hatebreed officially announced the albums name Fatal Paradox and its release date of November 6, 2026. The album was produced by longtime collaborator Zeuss who has produced the bands seven previous albums. The album features a cover of Corrosion of Conformity‘s "Poison Planet" along with John Tardy of Obituary who features on the song "Sacrifice Season". Lyrical content focuses on lead singer Jamey Jasta analyzing the world around him and his place in it.

== Release and promotion ==
The albums first single "Make the Demons Obey" was released prior to the album’s announcement on July 21, 2025. The second single "Kill Count Increase" was released on June 21, 2026, it was accompanied by a music video directed by Tom Flynn and Mike Watts. The third single the albums title track "Fatal Paradox" was released on August 26, the fourth single "The Carrion Choir" was released on September 30, alongside an official music video. The fifth and final single "Decisions Become Destinies" and its music video were released on November 4, 2026.

== Critical reception ==
Professional ratings
Review scores
Source	Rating
Blabbermouth.net	9/10
Distorted Sound	8/10
Kerrang!	4/5
New Noise Magazine	3.5/5 stars
Wall of Sound	7.5/10

Dom Lawson of Blabbermouth.net dubbed Fatal Paradox "the heaviest album in Hatebreed history." Adding "it feels like a celebration of the last three decades, with elements from all of the band's previous albums smashed together to form a near-perfect amalgam of iron-plated hardcore tropes, lacerating vocal hooks and lyrics that kick you in the ass and give you a warm, consolatory hug simultaneously." Duane James writing for Wall of Sound stated "as an album, it’s worth giving it a nudge from go to whoa with several peaks and troughs making this a journey worth going on." James Hingle of Kerrang! wrote "There’s no shortage of familiar Hatebreed trademarks, but that's precisely the point. Fatal Paradox is a genuine return to form, finding the veterans sounding as hungry, angry and vital as ever. Six years away, and they've come back swinging."

Commenting on the albums lyrical change compared to the bands prior releases Hutch of New Noise Magazine added "Fatal Paradox is a charged, relevant offering among the fields of unimaginative and gimmicky slop many bands contribute to the scene. This is not dumbed down or ignorant. Jasta’s lyrics are not convoluted with all positive affirmation/motivational speaker, "hang in there" memes. Running through Fatal Paradox for the first time, I feel there’s some sociopolitical stuff in there (no lyrics provided). Lyrical subjects constitute a truly denser album than references to an abstract “they or them“ that we must fight and resist."

== Track listing ==
All tracks are written by Hatebreed unless noted.

No.	Title	Length
1.	"Kill Count Increase"	2:28
2.	"The Carrion Choir"	3:05
3.	"Decisions Become Destinies"	3:10
4.	"Total Invincible"	2:39
5.	"Fatal Paradox"	2:42
6.	"Still a Threat"	3:21
7.	"Sacrifice Season" (Featuring John Tardy)	4:01
8.	"Truth Is a Lion"	2:54
9.	"Make the Demons Obey"	2:51
10.	"None Left to Save"	6:34
11.	"Poison Planet" (Corrosion of Conformity cover)	1:25
Total length:		35:10

== Personnel ==
Hatebreed

- Jamey Jasta – lead vocals
- Wayne Lozinak – lead guitar, backing vocals
- Frank Novinec – rhythm guitar, backing vocals
- Carl Schwartz – bass
- Matt Byrne – drums

Additional personnel

- Zeuss – production, engineering, mixing, mastering

== Charts ==
Chart performance for Fatal Paradox
Chart (2026)	Peak position
Austrian Albums (Ö3 Austria)	43
Belgian Albums (Ultratop Flanders)	173
Belgian Albums (Ultratop Wallonia)	61
French Physical Albums (SNEP)	103
French Rock & Metal Albums (SNEP)	27
German Albums (Offizielle Top 100)	22
German Rock & Metal Albums (Offizielle Top 100)	9
Scottish Albums (Official Charts)	94
Swiss Albums (Schweizer Hitparade)	41
UK Albums Sales (Official Charts)	86
UK Independent Albums (Official Charts)	40
UK Rock & Metal Albums (Official Charts)	14
US Top Album Sales (Billboard)	31
