= The Concrete Confessional =

Studio album by Hatebreed
- Released: May 13, 2016
- Genres: Metalcore; hardcore punk
- Length: 33:28
- Label: Nuclear Blast
- Producer: Chris "Zeuss" Harris

Hatebreed chronology
The Divinity of Purpose (2013)	The Concrete Confessional (2016)	Weight of the False Self (2020)

Singles from The Concrete Confessional
- 1. "A.D." Released: April 8, 2016

The Concrete Confessional is the seventh studio album by American metalcore band Hatebreed. It was released on May 13, 2016, via Nuclear Blast and was produced by Chris "Zeuss" Harris.

== Background ==
The album was included in Rolling Stone’s list of the "25 Most Anticipated Metal Albums for 2016".

On March 23, 2016, a trailer was uploaded to the Nuclear Blast YouTube channel, detailing Hatebreed's upcoming album by revealing its cover art, track listing and release date. The trailer features several snippets of three songs from the album, these being "A.D.", "Looking Down the Barrel of Today" and "The Apex Within". The trailer also includes details of the band's upcoming tours across Europe and North America, in support of the album. An official lyric video for the first single from the album, "A.D", was released on April 8, 2016. The second single "Looking Down the Barrel" was released on April 25, and was accompanied with a music video directed by David Brodsky. The third single "Seven Enemies" was released on May 9, alongside a lyric video and later had a music video made for it. Following the album’s release a music video for "Something’s Off" was released on July 21, 2016. In the U.S. the album sold 17,000 copies in its first week debuting at number 25 on the Billboard 200.

The album was initially supported with a North American tour with Devildriver and Devil You Know, the group then toured worldwide in support of the album all the way till 2017.

== Writing and recording ==
According to an article published by Loudwire, the album "deals heavily with topics such as social injustice, police brutality, drug abuse and self-positivity through positive mental attitude."

On the lyrical themes surrounding the opening track "A.D.", lead vocalist Jamey Jasta stated that the song "was a way that I could voice my frustration about the loss of opportunities available to the average guy. With the government and big business drowning in corruption and greed, the average person is being squeezed, so achieving the American dream is becoming less and less real. We all need to pay closer attention to what our elected leaders are doing. Start locally, in your own community, make your representatives accountable."

Hatebreed began demoing the album in late October of 2015. On December 2, it was announced Hatebreed had signed a brand new worldwide deal with Nuclear Blast to release the album. The album was recorded with longtime producer Zeuss and was mixed by Josh Wilbur.

== Album cover ==
The artwork is a literal depiction of the album's title, decorated with the skull and crossed morningstar emblem which Hatebreed has used in the past.

When asked about the cover art lead singer Jamey Jasta stated:

I think da Vinci said it best when he said painting is poetry that is seen rather than felt, and poetry is painting that is felt rather than seen. Marcelo [Vasco, album artist] was able to capture a feeling that will accompany our musical and lyrical vision and he put together a striking piece that speaks volumes.

== Reception ==
Professional ratings
Aggregate scores
Source	Rating
Metacritic	72/100
Review scores
Source	Rating
AllMusic	4/5 stars
Exclaim!	5/10
The Guardian	4/5 stars
Loudwire	Positive
Metal Injection	8/10
Metal Hammer	4/5 stars

The Concrete Confessional received mostly positive reviews from critics. On Metacritic, the album holds a score of 72/100 based on four reviews, indicating "generally favorable reviews".

Loudwire gave the album a positive review stating “The Concrete Confessional is music that inspires action.” Metal Injection wrote “The Concrete Confessional is no reinvention by any means, there is enough variety of material and reinvigoration in the band's energy to establish it as one of the best Hatebreed albums of the past decade.” Metal Hammer wrote “born leader Jamey Jasta is rallying from the frontlines, his gruff but precise shouts driving the lyrics home. Powerful, purposeful, and about as no-frills as it gets, his tone is authoritative and his frustration at corruption, evil, and the broken American dream is palpable.” The Guardian added "as they have consistently proved over the past two decades, Jamey Jasta and crew are an irresistible, unifying force in heavy music, and they sound more vital and ferocious than ever here."

== Track listing ==
All lyrics are written by Jamey Jasta; all music is composed by Hatebreed. Entire album mixed by Josh Wilbur.

No.	Title	Length
1.	"A.D."	2:50
2.	"Looking Down the Barrel of Today"	2:41
3.	"Seven Enemies"	2:05
4.	"In the Walls"	2:10
5.	"From Grace We've Fallen"	2:41
6.	"Us Against Us"	2:04
7.	"Something's Off"	3:49
8.	"Remember When"	2:40
9.	"Slaughtered in Their Dreams"	2:16
10.	"The Apex Within"	2:29
11.	"Walking the Knife"	2:36
12.	"Dissonance"	2:12
13.	"Serve Your Masters"	2:55
Total length:		33:28

== Credits ==
- Jamey Jasta – lead vocals
- Wayne Lozinak – lead guitar, backing vocals
- Frank Novinec – rhythm guitar
- Chris Beattie – bass
- Matt Byrne – drums

Additional musicians

- Charlie Bellmore – additional backing vocals
- Chris Taylor – additional backing vocals
- Nick Bellmore – additional backing vocals

Production

- Zeuss – producer, engineering, mastering
- Josh Wilbur – mixing
- Nick Bellmore – engineering
- Marcelo Vasco – artwork, layout, design
- Jeremy Saffer – photography

== Charts ==
Chart (2016)	Peak position
Australian Albums (ARIA)	33
Austrian Albums (Ö3 Austria)	23
Belgian Albums (Ultratop Flanders)	22
Belgian Albums (Ultratop Wallonia)	37
Canadian Albums (Billboard)	43
Dutch Albums (Album Top 100)	92
Finnish Albums (Suomen virallinen lista)	43
French Albums (SNEP)	138
German Albums (Offizielle Top 100)	17
Scottish Albums (OCC)	68
Swiss Albums (Schweizer Hitparade)	20
UK Albums (OCC)	78
UK Album Downloads (OCC)	78
UK Physical Albums (OCC)	51
UK Rock & Metal Albums (OCC)	3
UK Independent Albums (OCC)	6
UK Independent Album Breakers (OCC)	1
US Billboard 200 (Billboard)	25
US Top Rock Albums (Billboard)	3
US Top Hard Rock Albums (Billboard)	2
US Independent Albums (Billboard)	3
