= The Divinity of Purpose =

Studio album by Hatebreed
- Released: January 29, 2013
- Genres: Metalcore; hardcore punk
- Length: 37:00
- Labels: Razor & Tie (North America); Nuclear Blast (Europe)
- Producers: Hatebreed, Zeuss, Josh Wilbur

Hatebreed chronology
Hatebreed (2009)	The Divinity of Purpose (2013)	The Concrete Confessional (2016)

Singles from The Divinity of Purpose
- 1. "Put It to the Torch" Released: November 19, 2012; 2. "Honor Never Dies" Released: January 23, 2013

The Divinity of Purpose is the sixth studio album by American metalcore band Hatebreed. The album was released in North America on January 29, 2013, through Razor & Tie and in Europe on January 25, 2013, through Nuclear Blast Records. The album was co-produced by Hatebreed, Zeuss and Josh Wilbur. According to band frontman Jamey Jasta, the album will be "all pit, no shit". On November 12, 2012, the group debuted a track from the album titled "Put It to the Torch" on YouTube.

The Divinity of Purpose debuted at a career high No. 20 position on the Billboard 200 with over 17,400 copies sold in its first week. It has sold 55,000 copies in the US as of April 2016.

== Background and recording ==
Jamey Jasta has described the recording approach as having strong work ethic: the band recorded "near to home in a friend's studio." Jasta also claimed that having a good studio environment and a good environment on their recent tour made it easier for all the members of the band to be more creative during the recording and writing process.

The process involved collaboration: Jasta, guitarist(s), and other members would bring riffs, ideas, then refine them together. Frank Novinec (guitarist) said that for this album, Hatebreed intentionally aimed for songs that are more "meat and potatoes" — more direct, heavier, less "fluff."

In late March of 2012, Hatebreed had officially began writing for the album. On May 23, they officially entered the studio to begin recording, and by September 13, they had completed the record.

On October 11, 2012, it was announced Hatebreed had signed with Razor & Tie to release the album in North America and Nuclear Blast to release it in Europe.

== Lyrical content ==
The album title "The Divinity of Purpose" is not explicitly religious — Jasta has framed it as a metaphor for the internal struggle between light and dark, good and bad, and having a purpose to guide you. While the band retains their aggressive delivery and heavy instrumentation, they also emphasize uplifting, motivational messaging — resilience, standing by one's convictions, perseverance.

During an interview with Loudwire Jasta commented on the lyrical themes and title stating:

Although we had some bright moments on the last record like ‘In Ashes They Shall Reap’ and maybe a song like ‘Become the Fuse’ on this record, I wanted every song to have at least a big line or a big lyric that someone could really relate to. And because the title is ‘The Divinity of Purpose’ I really feel like that sparks a new thought within the listener. Maybe it would make someone say, “What is my purpose in life?,” and for me my purpose in life changed, for many years it was my daughter, for my teenage years it was music and now as an adult it has gone back to being music.

== Release ==
The albums first single "Put It to the Torch" was released on November 19, 2012, and was accompanied with an official lyric video. The songs official music video was later released on January 7, 2013, the song was later inducted into the Loudwire Death Match Hall of Fame. The second and final single "Honor Never Dies" was released on January 23, 2013, and also had a music video produced.

The Divinity of Purpose was officially released on January 29, 2013 and debuted at a career best #20 position on the Billboard 200 with over 17,400 copies sold in its first week. The album also topped the US Hard Rock chart and appeared at #6 on Top Rock chart, and #5 on the Independent chart.

The first official tour in support of the album took place in the US and went from late January to the middle of February 2013. Supporting acts consisted of Shadows Fall Dying Fetus and The Contortionist. In April they toured the US alongside Every Time I Die and Terror, During the Fall they went on tour with Shadows Fall, and Acacia Strain, they closed out the touring cycle with a November tour with Lamb of God and In Flames.

== Reception ==
Professional ratings
Aggregate scores
Source	Rating
Metacritic	75/100
Review scores
Source	Rating
About.com	4/5 stars
AllMusic	4/5 stars
CraveOnline	6/10 stars
Peek from the Pit	8/10 stars
Sputnikmusic	3.5/5
Metal Injection	8/10
Metal Hammer	4/5 stars
PopMatters	7/10
Ultimate Guitar	7.7/10
Lambgoat	8/10

The aggregate review site Metacritic assigned an average score of 75 to the album based on 5 reviews, indicating "generally favorable reviews".

In a positive review by AllMusic's James Christopher Monger, the reviewer characterized the record as "Meatier and more hardcore-centric than their last offering". Chad Bower of About.com commented positively on the album's quality of content as well stating "Jamey Jasta and company blaze through the 12 tracks on The Divinity of Purpose in under 40 minutes, with nary an ounce of filler".

In another positive review on Metalholic, Sairaj R. Kamath called the album, "one loud, charged-up, headstrong message of positive reinforcement, with such songs like "Own Your World," "Nothing Scars Me" and others having enough gusto to cure worldwide depression".

Loudwire wrote "Hatebreed have been delivering choppy, boot-to-the-throat moshcore for nearly two decades and they have returned to their signature, simple but slaughtering hardcore style, with an uplifting message on the album, as it is what made them one of the crucial bands of the '00s. You can kick up dust in the pit and then just chill out with a frosty beverage afterwards, since a 'Breed record always fully cleanses you of any anger or aggression you may have." Metal Hammer added "The Divinity Of Purpose has nudged this band forward without jeopardising their core values and thanks to this, combined with strong anthems and powerful vocal leadership, it feels fresh, fierce, and fervently ‘Hatebreed’."

In a mixed review of the album on CraveOnline, Iann Robinson commented on the albums repetition, stating "there is little variation from song to song but the intensity and drive help save Hatebreed from falling into parody like so many of their peers".

New Noise Magazine dubbed The Divinity Of Purpose the 54 best Rock / Metal album of 2013.

== Track listing ==
All lyrics are written by Jamey Jasta; all music is composed by Hatebreed.

No.	Title	Length
1.	"Put It to the Torch"	2:12
2.	"Honor Never Dies"	3:12
3.	"Own Your World"	3:39
4.	"The Language"	3:14
5.	"Before the Fight Ends You"	3:17
6.	"Indivisible"	2:56
7.	"Dead Man Breathing"	3:19
8.	"The Divinity of Purpose"	3:39
9.	"Nothing Scars Me"	3:08
10.	"Bitter Truth"	2:40
11.	"Boundless (Time to Murder It)"	3:21
12.	"Idolized and Vilified"	2:23
Total length:		37:00

== Personnel ==
Hatebreed

- Jamey Jasta – vocals
- Chris Beattie – bass guitar
- Wayne Lozinak – lead guitar
- Matt Byrne – drums
- Frank Novinec – rhythm guitar

Production

- Zeuss – record producer
- Josh Wilbur – record producer, audio mixing

== Charts ==
Chart (2013)	Peak position
Austrian Albums (Ö3 Austria)	28
Belgian Albums (Ultratop Flanders)	38
Belgian Albums (Ultratop Wallonia)	84
Dutch Albums (Album Top 100)	86
Finnish Albums (Suomen virallinen lista)	43
German Albums (Offizielle Top 100)	25
Swiss Albums (Schweizer Hitparade)	40
UK Albums (Official Charts)	144
UK Independent Albums (Official Charts)	19
UK Rock & Metal Albums (Official Charts)	12
US Billboard 200	20
US Independent Albums (Billboard)	5
US Top Hard Rock Albums (Billboard)	1
US Top Rock Albums (Billboard)	6
US Indie Store Album Sales (Billboard)	6
