= Jamey Jasta =

American metal vocalist (born 1977)

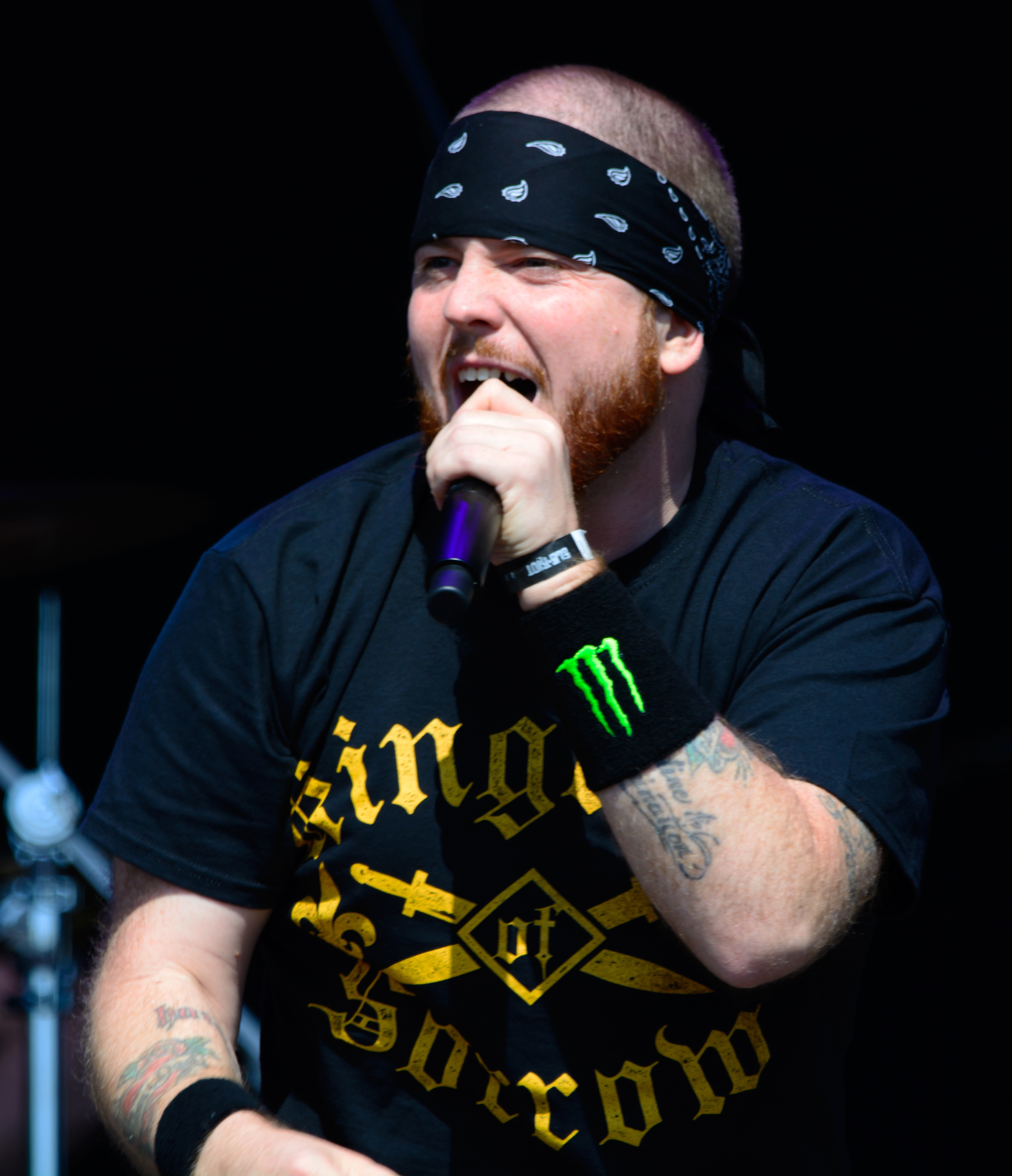
- Jasta performing in 2018

Background information
- Born: James Vincent Shanahan; August 7, 1977 (age 49); West Haven, Connecticut, U.S.
- Genres: Hardcore; Metalcore; Sludge Metal
- Occupations: Singer; Songwriter; Producer
- Years active: 1991–Present
- Member of: Hatebreed; Icepick; Kingdom of Sorrow; Jasta
- Formerly of: Jasta 14
- Website: jameyjasta.com

James Vincent Shanahan (born August 7, 1977), known professionally as Jamey Jasta, is an American vocalist, record producer and songwriter, best known as the lead singer of metalcore band Hatebreed. He also fronts the sludge metal band Kingdom of Sorrow and the metalcore band Icepick and has released several solo records. He has also produced albums for other artists.

In March 2006, Jasta was ranked at number 87 in Hit Parader's "Top 100 Metal Vocalists of All Time". Additionally, Hatebreed is viewed as an influential band in the hardcore genre.

== Early life ==
Jasta was born and raised in Connecticut. He grew up in a working-class household; his father a Marine who served in the Vietnam War "fell on hard times," and Jasta was the first in his family to go to public school. He grew up alongside his brother and sister, his parents later divorced during his youth. He discovered hardcore around age 12–13 and started attending shows at a club called The Moon in New Haven. The hardcore scene's inclusivity and toughness appealed to him. He never graduated from high school and began living on his own at the age of 13.

== Career ==
=== Hatebreed ===
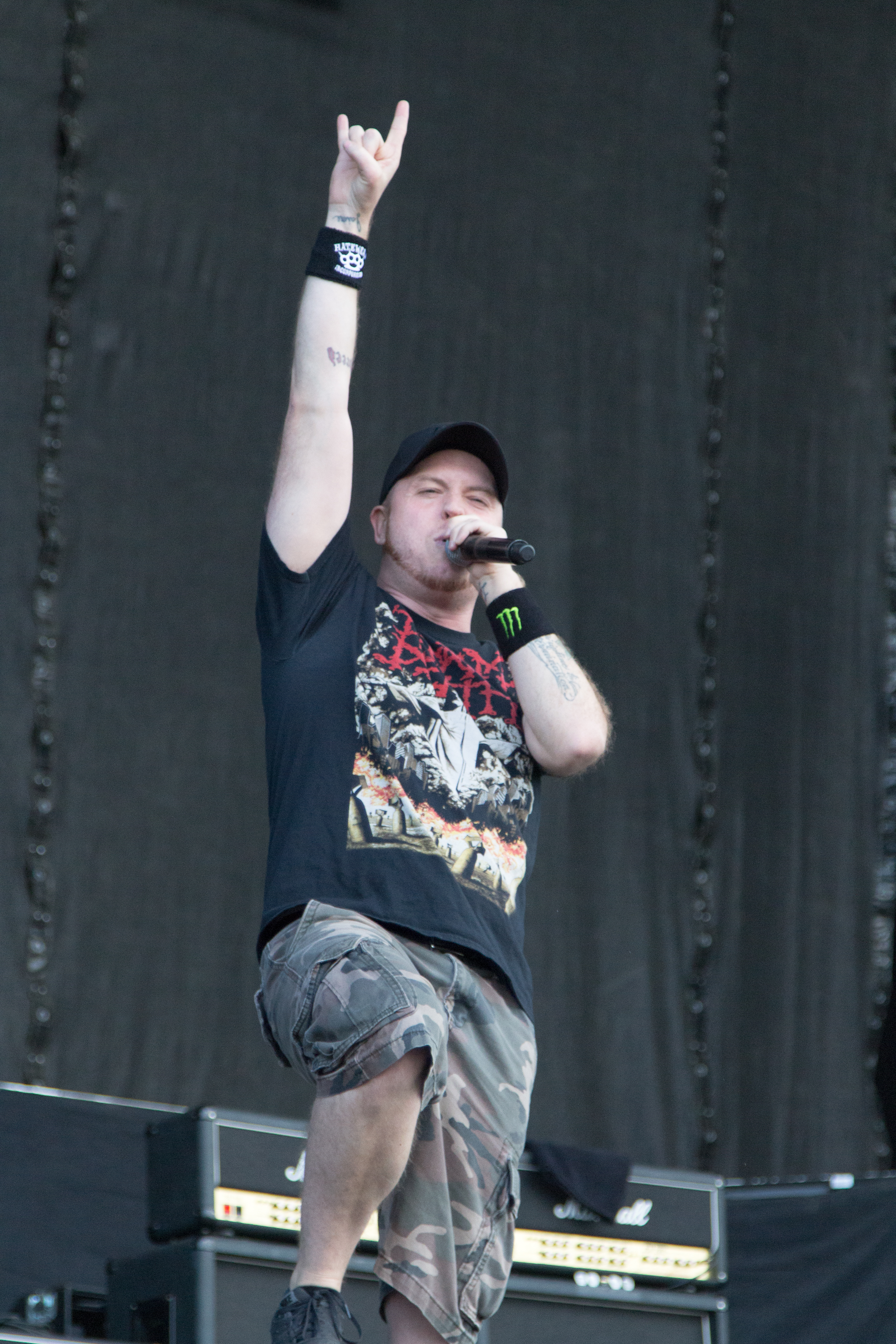
Jasta performing at Nova Rock in 2014

Jasta formed his first band called Dreadnaught, now known as Jasta 14, and developed a name for himself in the local scene even getting to open for Sick of It All. However, once he turned 16, he borrowed his grandfather's car and began to play with a group of guys that would eventually form Hatebreed in 1994. Jasta stated when he formed Hatebreed he had the intention to form something "bigger, better and more focused." They released their first EP in 1996, titled Under the Knife. Jasta said "We recorded it for $150 of our own money and people respect us for being the working man's band."

Their first album Satisfaction Is the Death of Desire was released in 1997 and has gone on to be viewed as a classic in both the hardcore and metalcore genres. Jasta and the band then see a boost in popularity with their acclaimed sophomore album Perseverance which was released in 2002. The success continued with The Rise of Brutality in 2004 which saw the bands song "Live for This" garnering them a Grammy nomination at the 47th Annual Grammy Awards for Best Metal Performance. This was followed by 2006's Supremacy, during the bands early years they were chaotic: heavy drinking, on-tour fights, hotel/bus incidents. Some of those antics damaged their reputation and led to them being booted off Warped Tour. This led to Jasta stopping drinking and leaving the chaotic lifestyle behind citing 2008 as a turning point toward sobriety/less partying. In 2009, they released their fifth album, a self-titled record. In 2013, they released their best commercially performing album, The Divinity of Purpose, which debuted at number 20 on the Billboard 200 along with topping the US Hard Rock Charts. This was then followed by 2016's The Concrete Confessional, 2020's Weight of the False Self. Their most recent album Fatal Pardox was released in 2026 marking the largest gap between album releases.

=== Solo career ===
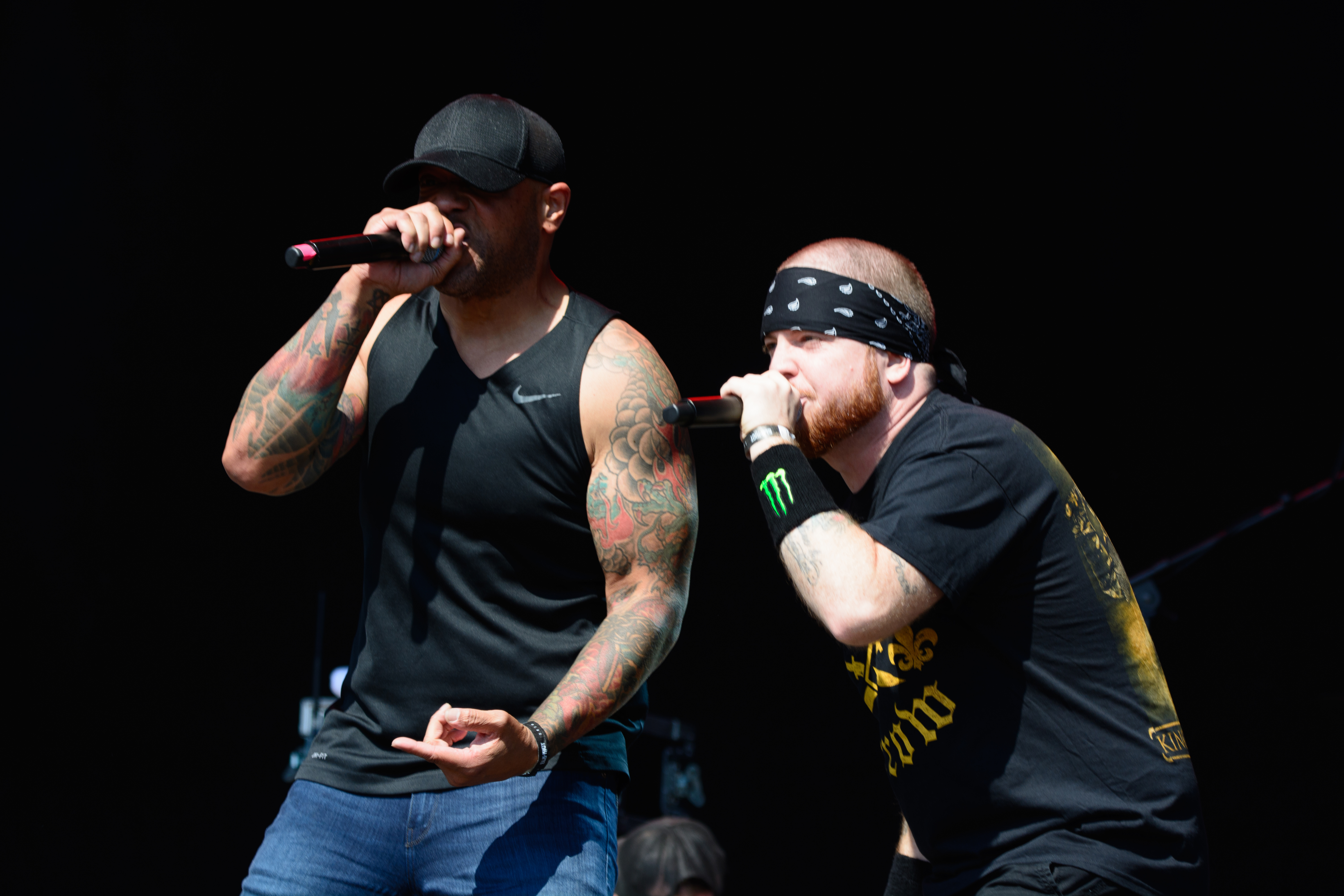
Jasta performing with Howard Jones in 2018

In 2011, Jasta released a solo album titled Jasta, collaborating with Randy Blythe and Mark Morton (Lamb of God), Zakk Wylde, Philip Labonte (All That Remains), and Tim Lambesis (As I Lay Dying). Jasta's debut solo album, through eOne Music. In Europe, the album was released via Century Media Records. AllMusic scored the album 4 out of 5 stars, while Blabbermouth.net gave it 6.5 out of 10 stars.

AllMusic claims "Like his flagship band, Jastas solo project utilizes punk, hardcore, and metal elements."

In 2015 Jasta made the walkout song for former UFC fighter Matt Brown titled “I am Immortal”. The UFC didn’t let Brown use the song at first but he was eventually able to.

He released a second album titled The Lost Chapters under the name Jasta in 2017; it featured a collection of previously released songs, with a couple of new ones included. It was released via his own record label Stillborn Records. His third album The Lost Chapters: Volume 2, was released in 2019 and featured collaborations with Jesse Leach (Kill Switch Engage), Matt Heafy (Trivium), Howard Jones (Light the Torch), and many more. Metal Master Kingdom gave the album a 6.5/10.

Jasta released his fourth and most recent solo album, ...And Jasta for All, in May 2024. It featured collaborations with Chuck Billy, Scott Ian, Steve Souza and Phil Demmel. Blabbermouth.net gave the album a 8.5/10, stating "Far more than an indulgent side-project, JASTA has evolved into something truly formidable on '...And Jasta for All'. With no frills, no bullshit and absolutely no filler, this is essentially Jamey Jasta in musical form and, yes, there really is something loud and invigorating here for just about everyone. Jasta gets it. The metal never stops.

In September of 2025 Jasta supported Life of Agony on the U.S. leg of their 30th anniversary tour for their album Ugly.

=== Other ventures and side projects ===
In 1996, he started his first side project titled Icepick, it remained stagnant until releasing a single in 2004 and have since released one album titled Violent Epiphany in 2006.

In 2000, Jasta was featured as a guest vocalist on Catch 22's Alone in a Crowd. He has since made numerous guest appearances with bands like Agnostic Front, Napalm Death and Terror.

In 2005, Jasta started a side project called Kingdom of Sorrow, alongside Kirk Windstein they have gone on to release two albums (Kingdom of Sorrow 2008, and Behind the Blackest Tears 2010) they still occasionally play live shows. He has described it as a different musical and performative experience than Hatebreed.

Jasta owns Stillborn Records, a hardcore- and metal-based record label from West Haven, Connecticut, and a "rock-themed apparel" line called Hatewear. The label is also part of Jasta perseverance-media group which he also founded.

Jasta was the host for MTV's Headbangers Ball from 2003 to 2007.

Jasta hosted the Metal Hammer Golden Gods Awards in 2007, 2016 and 2018.

Jasta created the music for "Stat of the Day" for the nationally syndicated radio and television talk show The Dan Patrick Show. Jasta appeared on air with Dan Patrick on January 25, 2013, discussing the making of the song.

Jasta’s first work as a producer came on Sworn Enemy’s 2003 album As Real As It Gets. He has since produced and co produced for many other bands such as Dee Snider's fourth solo album, For the Love of Metal. He also produced the follow-up that was released in the summer of 2021.

On May 16, 2025, Jasta served as the vocalist for a Stormtroopers of Death tribute set at the Milwaukee Metal Fest alongside Scott Ian on guitar, Dan Lilker on bass, and Scott Ian's son Revel Ian on drums.

== Related projects ==
Jamey Jasta

YouTube information
- Channel: The Jasta Show
- Years active: 2007–present
- Genre: Podcast
- Subscribers: 30.8 thousand
- Views: 3 million

In 2006 Jasta appeared in the independent film The House Of Usher.

On August 14, 2014, Jasta launched the Jasta Show podcast. He has interviewed guests such as Rob Halford, Vinnie Paul, Nick Diaz, Luis J. Gomez, Ice-T, and Kirk Hammett. As of 2025 the podcast has amassed over 700 episodes.

Jasta was also one of the hosts in the Chi Cheng's fundraiser song along with his band guitarist Wayne Lozinak. The song was produced by Korn bassist Fieldy to help to contribute to the Cheng Family. In 2018, Jasta co-hosted the 2nd Annual "Small Bites of Hope" alongside chef Brian Tsao and Jesse Leach in order to raise funds for Hope For The Day.

Jasta also runs his own clothing line titled Hatewear.

Jasta is also involved with organizing multiple metal festivals, in 2022 he bought the rights to the Milwaukee Metal Fest and brought it back for the first time in 19 years in 2023. He also helped resurrect The Summer Slaughter Tour, when it made its comeback in 2025.

== Artistry ==
Unlike many other metalcore vocalists, Jasta does not incorporate clean singing. According to Joe Davita of Loudwire, "Jasta's vocals lean on the beatdown grooves of the Connecticut band's music." He characterized Jasta's vocal deliver style as consisting of "deep, potent shouts." He also said Jasta's vocals "add an extra dimension to the quintet's aggro brand of metal."

In a 2016 interview with Metal Hammer Jasta stated "I write a lot of positive lyrics because there's always hope, no matter what you're going through“, adding "I want to be able to sing songs for the next 10 years that will always remind me that life's worth living." His songwriting emphasis is on perseverance, hope, working-class dignity, and resilience rather than nihilism — a deliberate counterpoint to the darker material often associated with heavy music.

Jasta's philosophy is the belief in the power of music to inspire and unite people. He emphasizes the importance of authenticity and staying true to one's roots while being open to growth and change.

== Personal life ==
Jasta refrains from smoking, drinking, and doing drugs but does not affiliate himself with the straight edge subculture. Jasta is married and has a daughter named Madison. In his spare time Jasta trains in Brazilian jiu jitsu and participates in charitable activities and makes donations, he also enjoys watching MMA and the WWE.

== Discography ==
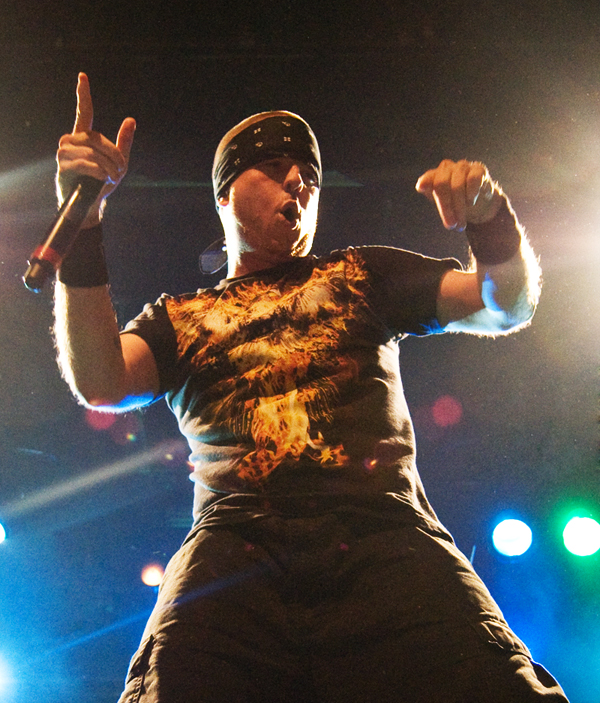
Jasta in 2009

=== Hatebreed ===
- Satisfaction Is the Death of Desire (1997)
- Perseverance (2002)
- The Rise of Brutality (2003)
- Supremacy (2006)
- Hatebreed (2009)
- The Divinity of Purpose (2013)
- The Concrete Confessional (2016)
- Weight of the False Self (2020)
- Fatal Paradox (2026)

=== Icepick ===
- Violent Epiphany (2006)

=== Kingdom of Sorrow ===
- Kingdom of Sorrow (2008)
- Behind the Blackest Tears (2010)

=== Jasta ===
- Jasta (2011)
- The Lost Chapters (2017)
- The Lost Chapters: Volume 2 (2019)
- ...And Jasta for All (2024)

=== Selected guest appearances ===
- Winds of Plague – "Built For War"
- The Acacia Strain – "Beast"
- 25 Ta Life – "Bullet for Every Enemy"
- Napalm Death – "Sold Short", "Instruments of Persuasion"
- Terror – "Spit My Rage"
- Sepultura – "Human Cause"
- Agnostic Front – "Peace"
- Biohazard – "Domination"
- Necro – "Push It to the Limit"
- E.Town Concrete – "Battle Lines"
- Special Teamz – "Gun In My Hand"
- Ill Niño – "Turns to Gray"
- Vanilla Ice – "Vanilla and Jasta Get Real Sweaty Together"
- Devil Inside – "Closer to Hell"
- Buried Alive – "To Live and Die With"
- Candiria – "Work in Progress"
- Do Or Die – "Guardian Angel"
- Straight Line Stitch – "Taste of Ashes"
- Brian Posehn – "The Gambler"
- Catch 22 – "Hard to Impress"

== Production discography ==
Year	Artist	Work	Role
2003	Sworn Enemy	As Real As It Gets	Co producer
2004	Agnostic Front	Another Voice	Co producer
2006	Sworn Enemy	The Beginning Of The End	Producer
2007	Danny Diablo	Thugcore 4 Life	Executive producer, management
2007	Thy Will Be Done	Was And Is To Come	Executive producer
2008	Kingdom of Sorrow	Kingdom of Sorrow	Producer, audio production, composer,
2010	Kingdom of Sorrow	Behind The Blackest Tears	Producer, composer
2011	Jasta	Jasta	Executive producer
2017	Jasta	The Lost Chapters	Producer
2018	Dee Snider	For The Love Of Meta	Producer
2019	Jasta	The Lost Chapters, Volume 2	Producer
2021	Dee Snider	Leave A Scar	Producer
2022	Corpsegrinder	Corpsegrinder	Co producer
2024	Many Eyes	The Light Age	Executive producer

== Awards and nominations ==
Year	Nominee / work	Award	Result
2011	Himself	Revolver Magazines 100 Greatest Living Rock Stars	Won
2021	The Jasta Show	Heavy Music Awards — Best Podcast	Nominated
