= Weight of the False Self =

Studio album by Hatebreed
- Released: November 27, 2020
- Studio: Dexters Lab Recording (Milford, Connecticut
- Genres: Metalcore; hardcore punk
- Length: 34:46
- Label: Nuclear Blast
- Producer: Zeuss

Hatebreed chronology
The Concrete Confessional (2016)	Weight of the False Self (2020)	Fatal Paradox (2026)

Weight of the False Self is the eighth studio album by American metalcore band Hatebreed. The album was released on November 27, 2020, through Nuclear Blast. It is the last to feature founding bass player Chris Beattie.

Jamey Jasta has stated The Weight of the False Self is the metaphorical weight that is carried by every individual. “Seen or unseen, everyone is carrying a burden. The music we love helps us bear the weight.”

== Background ==
In an interview the band’s guitarist Wayne Lozinak stated “ “There’s so much negativity we want to bring something positive something to make fans say ‘this song got me through tough times.’”

In another interview Jamey Jasta stated “I want to just sound like a maniac on this we just kept doing, changing the tone, leaning towards heavier stuff.”

The album was recorded prior to the COVID-19 pandemic however Jasta added “If people don’t know that it was recorded prior, they might think it’s a reflection of the times … there are positive songs some pessimistic.” The group had good chemistry with the producer Zeuss Jasta stated “He knows what sounds good he’ll tell us ‘ehh you got to change that’ “we always trust him to be honest.’”

== Critical reception ==
Max Heilman of Metal Injection stated that "Just by listening to the single 'Instinctive (Slaughterlust)', it's at least clear that Hatebreed hasn't forgotten how to be Hatebreed.” He gave it a 7/10.

Regarding the work, Dom Lawson of Blabbermouth.net gave it a 9/10 and said that "This is their strongest album in over a decade and the perfect antidote to looming grey skies."

Writing for Kerrang!, Olly Thomas noted "a certain predictability" in the album and gave it 3 out of 5 stars.

Tim Bolitho-Jones of Distorted Sound Magazine gave the album a 8/10 stating “ Weight Of The False Self is brutally heavy, remarkably optimistic and a bit like having a therapist roar self-improvement tips at you for thirty five minutes. And it’s all down to shouting. Shout, shout and shout again.”

Exclaim! gave the record a 7/10 stating “listeners have been searching far and wide for positive music to uplift them. Who knew that a band called Hatebreed would be the ones to deliver.”

== Track listing ==
Weight of the False Self track listing
No.	Title	Length
1.	"Instinctive (Slaughterlust)"	2:52
2.	"Let Them All Rot"	2:45
3.	"Set It Right (Start with Yourself)"	2:45
4.	"Weight of the False Self"	2:43
5.	"Cling to Life"	3:07
6.	"A Stroke of Red"	3:16
7.	"Dig Your Way Out"	2:15
8.	"This I Earned"	3:05
9.	"Wings of the Vulture"	2:41
10.	"The Herd Will Scatter"	3:06
11.	"From Gold to Gray"	2:53
12.	"Invoking Dominance"	3:18
Total length:		34:46

== Personnel ==
Hatebreed

- Jamey Jasta – lead vocals
- Wayne Lozinak – lead guitar, backing vocals
- Frank Novinec – rhythm guitar, backing vocals
- Chris Beattie – bass
- Matt Byrne – drums

Additional personnel

- Zeuss – production, engineering, mixing, mastering

== Charts ==
Chart (2020)	Peak position
Belgian Albums (Ultratop Flanders)	49
German Albums (Offizielle Top 100)	36
Hungarian Albums (MAHASZ)	34
US Top Hard Rock Albums (Billboard)	12
