= For the Lions =

Studio album of cover songs by Hatebreed
- Released: May 5, 2009
- Recorded: Late 2008 – early 2009
- Genres: Metalcore; hardcore punk
- Length: 48:02
- Label: Koch
- Producer: Chris "Zeuss" Harris

Hatebreed chronology
Supremacy (2006)	For the Lions (2009)	Hatebreed (2009)

For the Lions is a cover album by American metalcore band Hatebreed. The album was released on May 5, 2009 through Koch Records. The album consists of 18 cover songs from bands that had an influence on Hatebreed's music. The album was originally set to be released in winter 2008, but the band wanted to record a few more tracks for the record, and so the release date was pushed back.

== Singles ==
Starting on March 31, Hatebreed released a new single from For the Lions for purchase on iTunes every Tuesday until the album was released. The first single released was the cover of Black Flag's "Thirsty and Miserable". This single was followed by Suicidal Tendencies' "Suicidal Maniac", Sick of It All's "Shut Me Out", Slayer's "Ghosts of War", and finally Metallica's "Escape". Hatebreed also filmed a music video for their cover of "Ghosts of War". A video for "Thirsty and Miserable" was also filmed.

== Reception ==
Professional ratings
Aggregate scores
Source	Rating
Metacritic	66/100
Review scores
Source	Rating
AllMusic	3.5/5 stars
Consequence of Sound	C+

For the Lions received mixed to positive reviews from critics. On Metacritic, the album holds a score of 66/100 based on 4 reviews, indicating "generally favorable reviews".

Music review blog Gears of Rock said the band "diligently delivers all classic tracks with their signature blistering ferocity."

== Track listing ==
No.	Title	Writer(s)	Original artist (date)	Length
1.	"Ghosts of War"	Kerry King, Jeff Hanneman	Slayer (1988)	4:00
2.	"Suicidal Maniac"	Rocky George, Mike Muir	Suicidal Tendencies (1987)	3:06
3.	"Escape"	James Hetfield, Lars Ulrich, Kirk Hammett	Metallica (1984)	4:38
4.	"Hatebreeders"	Glenn Danzig	Misfits (1982)	2:51
5.	"Set It Off"	Freddy Cricien	Madball (1994)	2:37
6.	"Thirsty and Miserable"	Dez Cadena, ROBO	Black Flag (1981)	2:21
7.	"All I Had (I Gave)"	Kirk Windstein, Matt Thomas, Todd Strange, Craig Nunenmacher	Crowbar (1993)	3:15
8.	"Your Mistake"	Roger Miret, Vinnie Stigma	Agnostic Front (1984)	1:43
9.	"I'm In Pain"	Trevor Peres, Donald Tardy, John Tardy	Obituary (1992)	4:11
10.	"It's the Limit"	John Joseph, Harley Flanagan	Cro-Mags (1986)	1:40
11.	"Refuse/Resist"	Sepultura	Sepultura (1993)	3:07
12.	"Supertouch/Shitfit"	H.R., Dr. Know	Bad Brains (1982)	2:21
13.	"Evil Minds"	Kurt Brecht	Dirty Rotten Imbeciles (1985)	0:57
14.	"Shut Me Out"	Lou Koller, Pete Koller	Sick of It All (1992)	2:14
15.	"Sick of Talk"	John Brannon	Negative Approach (1982)	0:38
16.	"Life Is Pain"	Jorge Rosado	Merauder (1995)	3:21
17.	"Hear Me"	John Porcelly, Mike Ferarro	Judge (1989)	1:54
18.	"Boxed In"	Lou Di Bella, Larry Susi, Rich Kennon, Jim Eaton	Subzero (1997)	2:59
Total length:				48:02

=== Best Buy exclusive tracks ===
No.	Title	Writer(s)	Original artist (date)	Length
19.	"I, Spoiler"	Paul Bearer, Mark Neuman	Sheer Terror (1991)	2:01
20.	"To the Threshold (Live in Dallas)"		Hatebreed (2006)	2:31
21.	"Destroy Everything (Live in Dallas)"		Hatebreed (2006)	4:07
22.	"Defeatist (Live in Dallas)"		Hatebreed (2006)	2:40
23.	"The Most Truth (Live in Dallas)"		Hatebreed (2006)	2:40

== Charts ==
Chart	Peak position
Belgian Albums Chart (Flanders)	88

== Personnel ==
- Jamey Jasta – vocals
- Wayne Lozinak – lead guitar
- Frank Novinec – rhythm guitar
- Chris Beattie – bass
- Matt Byrne – drums
- Produced, engineered and mixed and mastering by Chris "Zeuss" Harris
