= Hatebreed (album) =

Studio album by Hatebreed
- Released: September 29, 2009
- Genre: Metalcore; hardcore punk
- Length: 41:54
- Label: E1 Music
- Producer: Zeuss

Hatebreed chronology
For the Lions (2009)	Hatebreed (2009)	The Divinity of Purpose (2013)

Singles from Hatebreed
- 1. "In Ashes They Shall Reap"; 2. "Everyone Bleeds Now"

Professional ratings
Review scores
Source	Rating
AllMusic	3.5/5 stars
Collector's Guide to Heavy Metal	7/10
Sputnikmusic	3.5/5 stars

Hatebreed is the fifth studio album by American metalcore band Hatebreed. It was released on September 29, 2009. Frontman Jamey Jasta had this to say regarding the new album: "This is our fifth studio album and it's a monster! We've survived some pretty rough times and the music shows it. There was no reason to change the recipe that our fans know and love but we added a few brutal new ingredients and we're more than amped on the results. Violence is a given!" This is the first full-length, non-cover studio album that founding member and lead guitarist Wayne Lozinak appears on.

== History ==
Hatebreed had previously announced that in addition to their cover album For the Lions, they would release their fifth studio album in 2009. On August 24, "In Ashes They Shall Reap" premiered on the band's official MySpace page. Three days later, they unveiled the artwork for the new album, followed by the release of the music video for "In Ashes They Shall Reap" on September 4. On September 10, RoadRunner Records UK made "Merciless Tide" available for free download.

== Track listing ==
All tracks are written by Hatebreed, except where noted.

No.	Title	Length
1.	"Become the Fuse"	2:27
2.	"Not My Master"	3:14
3.	"Between Hell and a Heartbeat"	2:54
4.	"In Ashes They Shall Reap"	3:21
5.	"Hands of a Dying Man"	2:48
6.	"Everyone Bleeds Now"	2:56
7.	"No Halos for the Heartless"	2:57
8.	"Through the Thorns"	3:24
9.	"Every Lasting Scar"	3:14
10.	"As Damaged as Me"	2:21
11.	"Words Became Untruth"	2:33
12.	"Undiminished" (instrumental)	4:19
13.	"Merciless Tide"	2:41
14.	"Pollution of the Soul"	2:45
Total length:		41:54

US edition bonus track
No.	Title	Writer(s)	Length
15.	"Escape" (Metallica cover; New Diehard Edit)	James Hetfield; Kirk Hammett; Lars Ulrich	4:01
Total length:			45:55

Japanese edition bonus track
No.	Title	Length
15.	"Lay It All to Waste"	2:19
Total length:		44:13

Wal-Mart edition bonus tracks
No.	Title	Writer(s)	Length
15.	"Escape" (Metallica cover; New Diehard Edit)	Hetfield; Hammett; Ulrich	4:01
16.	"Lay It All to Waste"		2:19
17.	"Preservation of Belief"		2:20
Total length:			50:34

iTunes pre-order edition bonus tracks
No.	Title	Length
15.	"Kill an Addict" (2010 re-recording)	1:02
16.	"Filth" (2010 re-recording)	1:40
Total length:		44:36

Best Buy edition bonus tracks
No.	Title	Length
15.	"To the Threshold" (live)	2:32
16.	"As Diehard as They Come" (live)	2:17
Total length:		46:43

Special edition bonus DVD
No.	Title	Length
1.	"Live at Download Festival 2009 and Wacken 2008"
2.	"Making of the Album" (Documentary)
3.	"Ghosts of War" Music Video" (Director's Cut)
4.	"Thirsty and Miserable" Music Video" (Director's Cut)

== Personnel ==
- Jamey Jasta – vocals
- Frank Novinec – rhythm guitar
- Chris Beattie – bass guitar
- Wayne Lozinak – lead guitar
- Matt Byrne – drums
- Produced, engineered and mixed by Chris "Zeuss" Harris

== Charts ==
Chart (2009)	Peak position
Australian Albums (ARIA Charts)	68
Austrian Albums (Ö3 Austria)	60
Belgian Albums (Ultratop Flanders)	50
Belgian Albums (Ultratop Wallonia)	81
Dutch Albums (Album Top 100)	73
French Albums (SNEP)	156
German Albums (Offizielle Top 100)	45
UK Albums (OCC)	163
US Billboard 200	37
US Independent Albums (Billboard)	4
US Top Hard Rock Albums (Billboard)	8
US Top Rock Albums (Billboard)	16
