= Satisfaction Is the Death of Desire =

Studio album by Hatebreed
- Released: November 11, 1997
- Genres: Metalcore; hardcore punk
- Length: 26:05
- Label: Victory
- Producer: Steve Evetts

Hatebreed chronology
Under the Knife (1996)	Satisfaction Is the Death of Desire (1997)	Perseverance (2002)

Professional ratings
Review scores
Source	Rating
AllMusic	link
Collector's Guide to Heavy Metal	7/10
Kerrang!	4/5 stars
Metal Hammer	7/10

Satisfaction Is the Death of Desire is the debut studio album by American hardcore band Hatebreed. It was released on November 11, 1997, through Victory Records. This was the band's breakthrough album, with the majority of critics praising it, even calling it a "hardcore classic". It lifted them out from the underground scene and thanks to this rise in fame they got a record deal with Universal Records. The album became the highest-selling record in Victory Records history.

== Critical reception ==
The album has received high praise from critics AllMusic wrote “With Sepultura-like vocals and ferocious, Slayer-style guitar riffs, these scary-looking, tattooed dudes from Connecticut have successfully crossed over from the hardcore scene to the metal scene. Metal Hammer wrote “when you listen to it today you can hear all of the sounds that have become a staple of Hatebreed’s career: half-time, stomping, barely concealed Slayer worship and a set of chest swelling lyrics barked out in Jamey Jasta’s gruff, bulldog grunts.” Loudwire wrote “Hatebreed showed the power and destruction that could be felt in tracks that were quick and to the point. Its album title, 'Satisfaction Is the Death of Desire,' defined the band’s viewpoint on life, as singer Jamey Jasta refused to be held down by anyone, his words giving the music an empowering, tough love spin.”

== Legacy ==
The album is considered a landmark in both the hardcore and metalcore genres. In 2018 Kerrang named to their list of the top 21 best metalcore albums of all time, and in 2020 Loudwire named it the 15th greatest Metalcore album of all time. Revolver named it the 62nd greatest metal album of all time on its list of the 69 Greatest Metal Albums Of All Time.

In 2021, Revolver named it to their list of the top 10 most influential metalcore albums of all time, stating: “Satisfaction Is the Death of Desire, is the least capital “M” Metalcore album in their imposing discography, but it’s the one that had the most impact on the genre they’d go on to define.”

Terror vocalist Scott Vogel voiced his opinion that the album, “broke down every barrier and shattered every ceiling with this debut classic. The music is so direct and to the point and Jamey’s voice and lyrics are 100-percent ear shattering and also completely memorable after one listen.” via Decibel Magazine.

Hit Parader named it the second greatest hardcore album of all time in 2007.

== Track listing ==
No.	Title	Length
1.	"Empty Promises"	1:18
2.	"Burn the Lies"	1:45
3.	"Before Dishonor"	2:49
4.	"Puritan"	2:11
5.	"Conceived Through an Act of Violence"	1:44
6.	"Afflicted Past"	1:41
7.	"Prepare for War"	2:00
8.	"Not One Truth"	2:02
9.	"Betrayed by Life"	1:39
10.	"Mark My Words"	1:51
11.	"Last Breath"	1:33
12.	"Burial for the Living"	1:40
13.	"Worlds Apart"	2:04
14.	"Driven by Suffering"	1:48

Some original pressings of the record have the last track incorrectly titled "Dirven by Suffering".

== Pressing information ==
Hatebreed – Satisfaction – Blue Vinyl 510 copies, Black Vinyl, Red Vinyl 506 copies, White Vinyl 509 copies, Clear Vinyl 510 copies, Purple Vinyl 665 copies, Green Vinyl 660 copies, and Pink Vinyl 210 copies.

== Personnel ==
- Jamey Jasta – vocals
- Lou "Boulder" Richards – rhythm guitar
- Chris Beattie – bass guitar
- Jamie Pushbutton – drums
- Matt McIntosh – lead guitar

Production

- Sean Bonner – construction
- Jesse Burke – photography
- Alan Douches – mastering
- Steve Evetts – producer, engineer
- Jamie Murphy – photography
- Adam Tanner – photography
