= Hatebreed =

American metalcore band

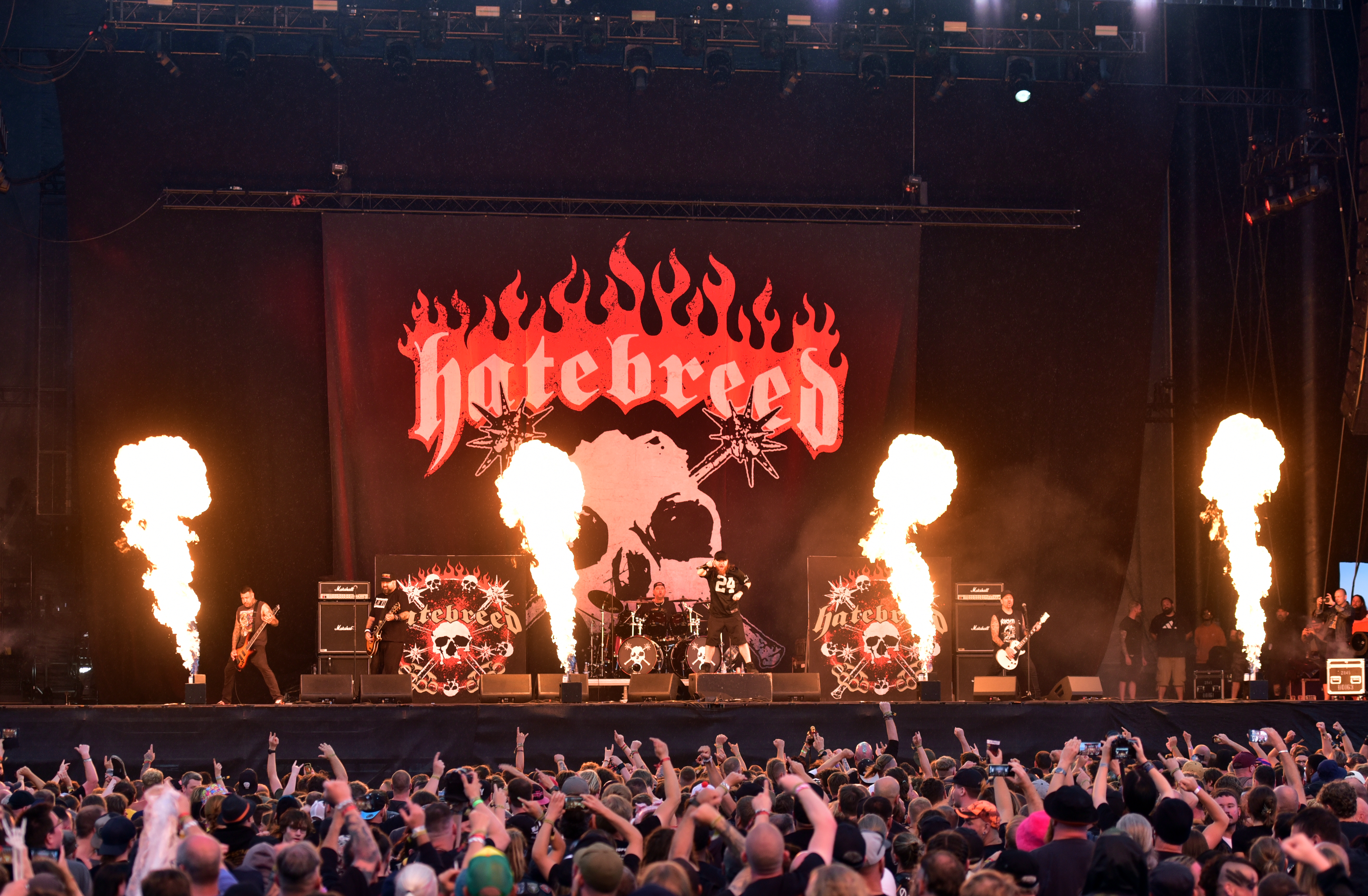
- Hatebreed at Reload Festival 2024

Background information
- Origin: Bridgeport, Connecticut, U.S.
- Genres: Metalcore; hardcore punk
- Years active: 1994–present
- Labels: Victory; Stillborn; Universal; Roadrunner; Koch; Razor & Tie; Nuclear Blast; BlkIIBlk
- Spinoffs: Icepick
- Members: Jamey Jasta; Matt Byrne; Frank Novinec; Wayne Lozinak; Carl Schwartz
- Past members: Chris Beattie; Larry Dwyer Jr.; Dave Russo; Nick "Nickel P" Papantoniou; Matt McIntosh; Jamie "Pushbutton" Muckinhaupt; Rigg Ross; Lou "Boulder" Richards; Sean Martin
- Website: hatebreed.com

Hatebreed is an American hardcore band formed in 1994 in Bridgeport, Connecticut, and later based in New Haven, Connecticut. The band released its debut album Satisfaction Is the Death of Desire in 1997, which gave the band a cult following. The band signed to Universal Records and released Perseverance in 2002, which hit the Billboard 200. They have played a major role in the Connecticut hardcore scene.

Their songs often feature motivational lyrics, powerful and "bruising" riffs, and an overall hardcore sound. Their song "Live for This" was nominated at the Grammy Awards in 2005 for Best Hardcore Performance. The group are also known for their live performances, and have gone through multiple line up changes but lead singer Jamey Jasta has remained a staple throughout the band's tenure. Their latest album, Fatal Paradox, was released in 2026.

== History ==
=== Formation and Satisfaction Is the Death of Desire (1994–2001) ===
Hatebreed was formed in 1994 in and around New Haven, Connecticut. The founding members consisted of Jamey Jasta the frontman, Chris Beattie on bass, Dave Russo on drums along with Larry Dwyer Jr. and Wayne Lozinak as the guitarists. This five piece began by recording a three-song demo and selling it to locals in 1995 and those songs would eventually be released on a split 7-inch with New York's Neglect in the same year. They followed that with the highly acclaimed EP Under the Knife scheduled to come out on Big Wheel Recreation in 1995 but then self-released in 1996, and they went out on tour around the east coast/midwest supporting UKHC band Voorhees. That same year saw the departures of Larry Dwyer Jr. and Dave Russo. The following year with an almost entirely new lineup the band released their debut album Satisfaction Is the Death of Desire on Victory Records, then the home of some of the biggest bands in American hardcore. The album helped the band achieve underground success, selling 158,000 copies, according to Nielsen SoundScan, and holds the record for Victory Record's best selling debut album. The album is also viewed as a classic in both the hardcore and metalcore genres.

They then took part in the Warped Tour in 1998. During the late 1990s and early 2000s Hatebreed went through many lineup changes, with Jasta and Beattie being the two mainstays. They continued touring heavily during this time joining the Tattoo the Earth tour in 2000 and making their first appearance at Ozzfest in 2001. That same year longtime drummer Matt Byrne joined the band.

Hatebreed were booked to play at the second New England Metal and Hardcore Festival in 2000. Misfits headlined the main stage, Anal Cunt headlined the second stage and Hatebreed headlined the Commercial Street Cafe. Problems arose when the Hatebreed set was shut down due to problems with the sound system, so security moved Hatebreed to Anal Cunt's stage, and set them up to play before them. This apparently upset the audience that were expecting to see Anal Cunt, and according to Josh Martin, vocalist Jasta got angry and called the crowd a bunch of "washed up metalheads" and allegedly claimed that Hatebreed were more popular and sold more records than Anal Cunt. Seth Putnam and Martin were at the bar next door not knowing what was going on, but returned by the time the Hatebreed set was over to see that Putnam was yelled at by Jasta. A melee then ensued. Martin who owned a VHS tape of the fight (which ended up getting lost) claimed that Putnam was standing 20 feet away watching the melee ensue. Putnam was arrested by the end of the night, along with his wife.

=== Perseverance and The Rise of Brutality (2002–2005) ===
Their tours with heavy metal bands such as Slayer, Deftones, Entombed and Napalm Death influenced their music and brought them to the attention of many non-hardcore fans. These influences were apparent on the band's next two releases. Prior to the release of their next album Hatebreed recorded a demo in New York that contained the song "I Will Be Heard". Lead singer Jasta who was looking to get the band off of the indie labels they sent the demo to several major labels and began interviewing 10+ major record producers. The demo became well liked by multiple major labels and Hatebreed eventually signed with Universal Records. The group then hired Matt Hyde to produce the album and began recording at Long View Farm Studios in North Brookfield, Massachusetts, during late 2001. In October of that year they dropped of a tour with Slayer to finish the album.

Perseverance was then released in 2002 and became the band's first to chart on the Billboard 200 peaking at number 50. The album has gone on to receive high praise highlighting its powerful riffs, Jasta's commanding vocals, and excellent production, making it a streamlined and brutal listening experience. The popular single "I Will Be Heard" music video, which featured intense live performance footage and aggressive imagery, ended up getting banned from MTV which was a huge blow to the band. However the song eventually got significant play time on MTV2's Headbangers Ball, when vocalist Jasta became the host in 2003. Hatebreed went on an extensive tour support of the album, the first being a US headlining tour with Bane, Poison The Well, and What Feeds The Fire serving as support. They also made their second appearance at that years Ozzfest, appearing on the Ozzfest 2002 live album.

The following year seen the release of their third studio album The Rise of Brutality which charted even higher on the Billboard 200 debuting at number 30 selling 32,515 copies in its first week. This album is viewed as a pivotal album in Hatebreed's discography showcasing a tighter, more focused version of their metallic hardcore sound. Critically, reviewers were largely impressed with the album's unrelenting aggression and motivational lyrics. Once again they went on an extensive touring schedule for the album including taking part in The Unholy Alliance Tour in Europe with Slayer, Slipknot and Mastodon.

From November 24, until December 20, Hatebreed toured alongside Terror. In December 2004, it was announced that Hatebreed was nominated for a Grammy Award for Best Metal Performance at the 47th Grammy Awards in Los Angeles for their song "Live for This", which appeared on their album The Rise of Brutality. The award was ultimately given to Motörhead for their cover of the Metallica song "Whiplash".

=== Supremacy, For the Lions and self-titled fifth album (2006–2009) ===
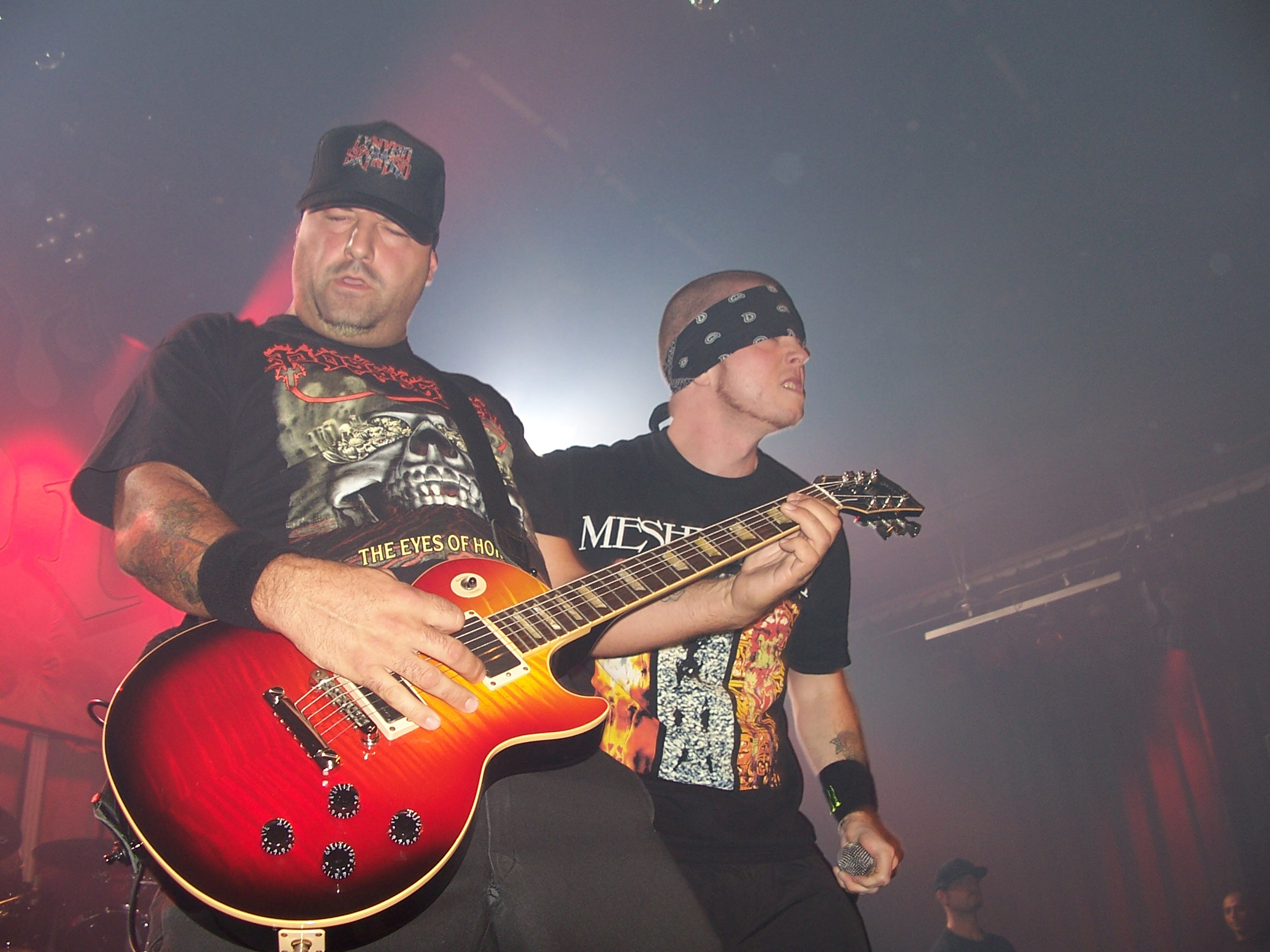
Hatebreed performing in Amsterdam in 2009

On January 27, and March 4, 2006 Hatebreed released two news song on their MySpace page. Then on April 30, the group announced a new album would be released in August of that same year. In June of 2006, Hatebreed went on an extensive European tour which included a performance at the Download Festival in Castle Donington, UK. Immediately following this European tour, they played the main stage at Ozzfest 2006 alongside DragonForce, Lacuna Coil, Avenged Sevenfold, Disturbed, and co-headliners System of a Down. The band's fourth album, Supremacy, was released in August 2006, their first through Roadrunner Records, featuring new guitarist Frank Novinec (who had previously spent time playing with Ringworm, Terror, and Integrity). Jasta described it as an "all-out onslaught of completely adrenaline-charged, in-your-face brutality". The album debuted at number 31 on the Billboard 200 selling 27,000 units in its first week. It also became their first record to chart in the top 100 in several countries outside the US. It was met with mostly positive reception, Blabbermouth.net wrote "The bottom line is that you will find in Supremacy exactly what you would expect from Hatebreed. Though not as memorable as the excellent Perseverance, the album largely succeeds at giving the fans what they want." Following the album’s release in September of 2006, Hatebreed headlined the US "Monsters of Mayhem" tour alongside Napalm Death and Exodus. The group then headlined a Canadian tour with Sworn Enemy and Scars of Tomorrow in October and a European tour in November of that year alongside Unearth and Full Blown Chaos.

On September 13, 2006, former guitarist Lou Richards committed suicide at the age of 35; he had played on Satisfaction Is the Death of Desire and Perseverance before leaving the band in 2002.

Hatebreed headlined the second stage on the 2007 Ozzfest tour, that year they also headlined the Monster of Mayhem tour with acts like God Forbid, Terror, The Acacia Strain, Evergreen Terrace and After the Burial. Hatebreed appeared at Wacken Open Air festival in 2008 alongside Iron Maiden, Children of Bodom, and Avantasia. In April 2008, Hatebreed signed a worldwide deal with Koch Records. On February 9, 2009, guitarist Sean Martin quit the band. Sean quit the band to pursue other interests in music that are more studio-related. However, Sean remains close to and in contact with Hatebreed members. This resulted in the return of founding guitarist Wayne Lozinak. In May of that year they the band released For the Lions on May 5, a studio record consisting of covers of songs by artists that have influenced the band's development. Artists covered included Metallica, D.R.I., Crowbar, and Cro-Mags.

On September 2, 2009 Hatebreed released their first concert DVD, titled Live Dominance which debuted at number 1 on the Billboard DVD chart. Later that same year, Hatebreed's self-titled fifth studio album, was released on September 29. The record debuted at number 37 on the Billboard 200 selling 15,000 units in its first week, it was met with positive reception. Following the album’s release Hatebreed headlined a US tour which went till mid December, supporting acts consisted of Cannibal Corpse and Unearth.

=== The Divinity of Purpose and The Concrete Confessional (2010–2016) ===
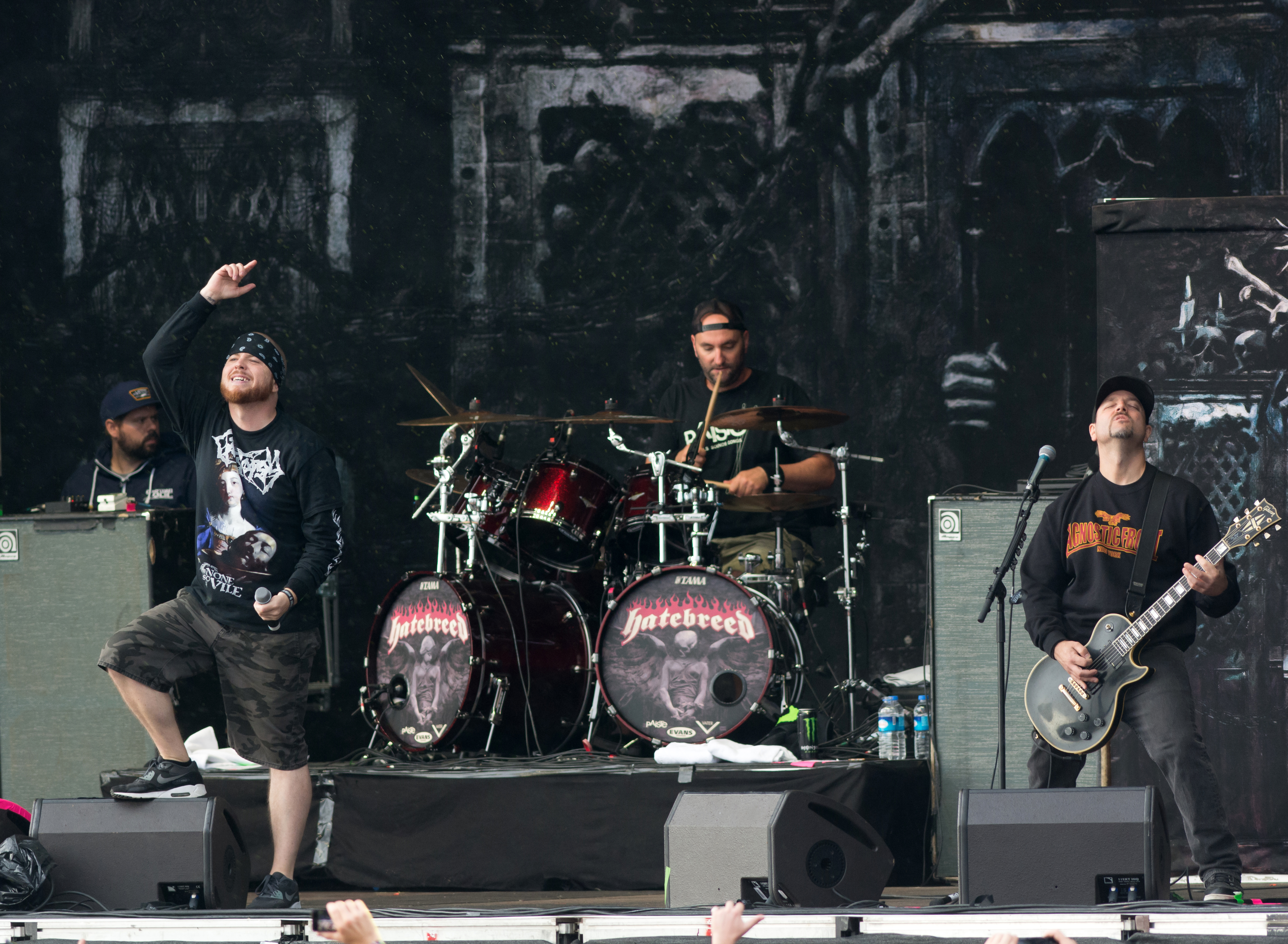
Hatebreed live on 2017

In 2010, Hatebreed participated in the third annual Mayhem Festival, alongside 3 Inches of Blood, Shadows Fall, and other bands. On February 17, 2011, it was announced that Hatebreed would partake in the fourth annual Mayhem Festival to yet again headline the Jägermeister stage for three dates only. In 2012 the band went on Australian tour alongside the Cro-Mags and Biohazard, They also held a celebration tour for the 10th anniversary of their album Perseverance. On September 19, 2012 Hatebreed released a single for their upcoming album "Put It To The Torch". Then in December of that year the group released a promotional trailer for the record.

Their sixth studio album, The Divinity of Purpose, was eventually released on January 25, 2013, in Europe and on January 29 in North America. The cover art was done by Eliran Kantor (Testament, Sodom). The album became their highest charting on the Billboard 200 selling 17,400 units and peaking at number 20, it also charted at number 1 on the US Hard Rock Chart. Along with the chart success the album was met with generally positive reviews, AllMusic's James Christopher Monger, the reviewer characterized the record as "Meatier and more hardcore-centric than their last offering." The first official tour in support of the album took place in the US and went from late January to the middle of February 2013. Supporting acts consisted of Shadows Fall, Dying Fetus and The Contortionist. In April they toured the US alongside Every Time I Die and Terror, During the Fall they went on tour with Shadows Fall, and Acacia Strain, they closed out the touring cycle with a November tour with Lamb of God and In Flames. Hatebreed also got to play on the 2013 Vans Warped Tour in Australia alongside bands like Parkway Drive, The Offspring, Simple Plan, The Used, We Came as Romans, Man Overboard, H2O and many more, as well as the United Kingdom Warped Tour alongside Coheed and Cambria, Rise Against, Enter Shikari, Flogging Molly, Like Moths to Flames, The Wonder Years, Sublime with Rome and much more. In 2014 they embarked on a Latin America tour alongside Napalm Death. They went on a co-headlining North America tour with the Butcher Babies that went into 2015. In the Spring of that year they supported Slipknot on their North American tour.

On March 23 Hatebreed unveiled audio clips for three songs off their upcoming album, the first single was then released in April. Hatebreed released its seventh album, The Concrete Confessional, on May 13, 2016. The album debuted at number 25 on the Billboard 200 and charted even higher in Belgium, Austria and Switzerland. Like many of their previous albums it received positive reception, keeping up with the style they are known for. The album was initially supported with a North American tour with Devildriver and Devil You Know, the group then toured worldwide in support of the album all the way till 2017. During a show on May 15, then granted a wish to a deceased fan named Dennis Guyot by spreading his ashes on stage during a show in Cleveland the song "As Diehard as They Come" was also created in Guyrots honor.

=== Weight of the False Self (2017–2024) ===
Hatebreed was announced to take part on the 2017 Vans Warped Tour, as they appeared on the Monster Energy Stage alongside other bands like Gwar, CKY, Carnifex, Municipal Waste, After the Burial, Silent Planet, Anti Flag and many more groups rounded out the lineup. Hatebreed also toured extensively in celebration of two of their albums anniversary's dubbed the "20 Years of Satisfaction Is the Death of Desire & 15 Years of Perseverance tour" which extended into 2018. They also embarked on the EMP Persistence Tour alongside Madball and Terror later that year.

In 2019, Hatebreed held an extensive tour in celebration of their 25th anniversary. The first leg of the tour took place in April with Cro-Mags, Terror, and Fit for an Autopsy. The second leg was held in May with Agnostic Front, Skeletal Remains and Madball, Obituary took part in both legs. Following the tour Jamey Jasta said the band would spend the second half of 2019 writing and recording a new album. Jasta then stated the record would be released in May of 2020, however this was delayed indefinitely due to the Covid-19 Pandemic.

The band's eighth studio album, Weight of the False Self, was released on November 27, 2020. The album was met with positive reception, Regarding the work, Dom Lawson of Blabbermouth.net said that "This is their strongest album in over a decade and the perfect antidote to looming grey skies."

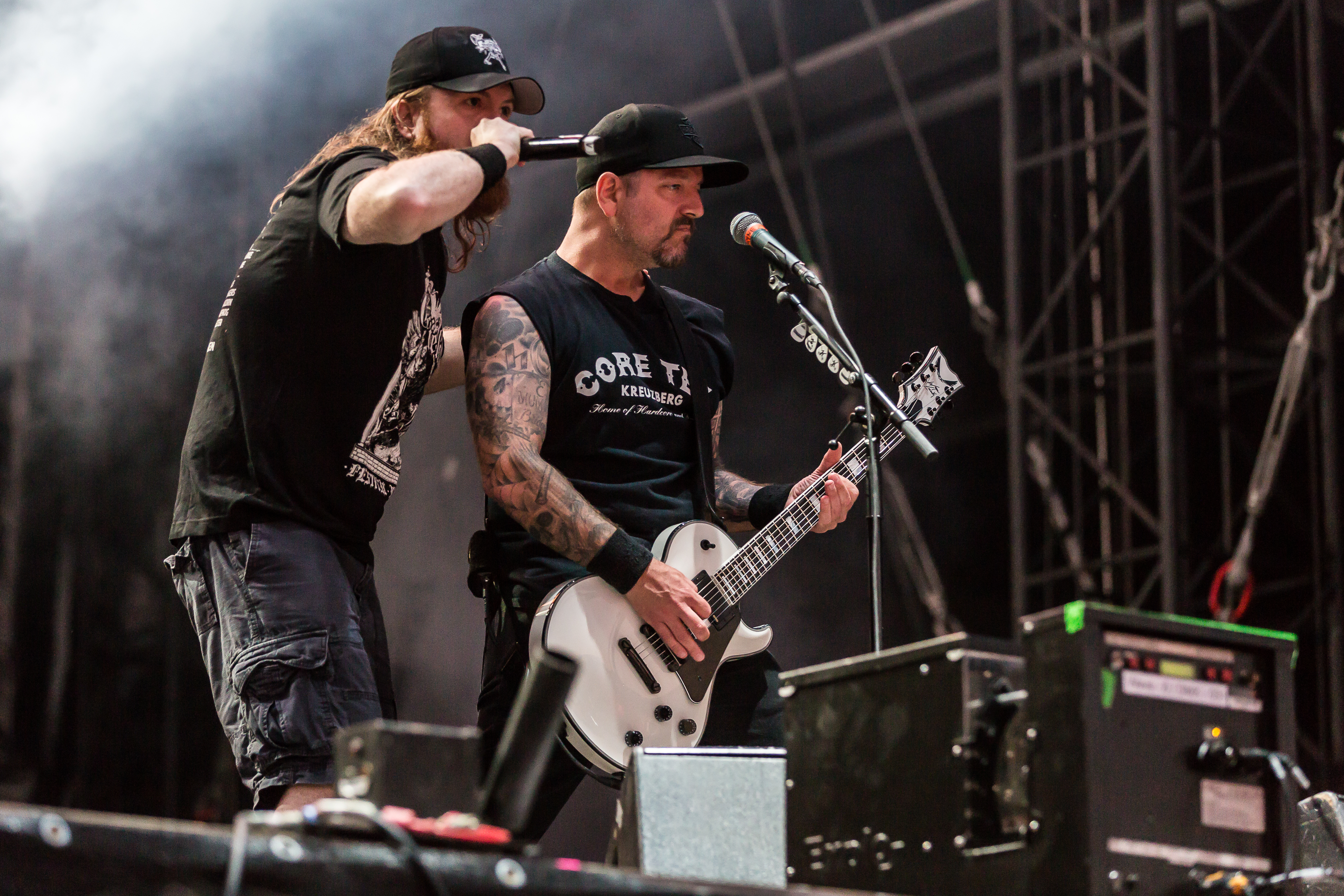
Hatebreed in 2023 at the Full Force festival in Ferropolis, Germany.

In the summer of 2021, Hatebreed, along with Trivium, served as an opening act for Megadeth and Lamb of God on the "Metal Tour of the Year". Hatebreed replaced In Flames, who were forced to withdraw from the tour due to international visa issues caused by the COVID-19 pandemic.

In 2022 Hatebreed went on an extensive tour in celebration of the 20th anniversary of Perseverance with former guitarist Sean Martin reuniting with the group for part of the tour. In the summer of 2023, they held a European tour titled the "European Slaughterlust" which featured bands such as Unearth and Terror as support. They also embarked on a North American tour in celebration of The Rise of Brutality 20th anniversary.

In 2024, Hatebreed embarked on a 30th anniversary tour which included a special Home State show, titled "The March Metal Matinee" which was held on March 17, 2024, at the Toyota Oakdale Theatre in Wallingford, CT. It featured bands such 100 Demons and Shadows Fall. The tour included a European run with Crowbar in the Summer and a Fall US leg with Carcass, Harms Way, and Crypta. On November 13, 2024, Hatebreed split from founding member Chris Beattie. In a 2025 interview, Beattie stated it was "completely unexpected." Adding "it was not my decision to leave the band. Someone saw an opportunity to get me out of the picture, and that's where I am now." He has since filed a lawsuit against the band and Jasta. Matt Bachand was then chosen as his replacement on their tour dates.

=== Fatal Paradox (2025–present) ===
As early as 2023, Hatebreed began working on new material for their ninth studio album. In June 2025, guitarist Wayne Lozinak stepped away during the band's European tour due to a brain tumor diagnosis. On July 21, 2025, they released new music for the first time in five years with the single "Make the Demons Obey" Matt Bachand then took over for the rest of the tour. Lozinak underwent successful surgery to remove the tumor in August. The band then performed at the Sonic Temple music festival in Columbus, Ohio in May of 2025. In the summer of 2025, they resurrected the Summer Slaughter tour, headlining alongside Bleeding Through and Malevolence. They co-headlined Michigan Metal Fest in August of 2025 with Chelsea Grin and Hed PE. In October 2025, they supported Killswitch Engage on their UK/Ireland tour, this also seen the return of Lozinak post-surgery.

The band was confirmed to be making an appearance at Welcome to Rockville, which took place in Daytona Beach, Florida in May 2026. In June, they headlined the Summer Slaughter tour for a second consecutive year, with support from Devourment, Incantation, and Snuffed on Sight. That same month, it was announced that Hatebreed had signed with BlkIIBlk Records, and their ninth studio album Fatal Paradox would be released on November 6, 2026. They will tour Europe with Life of Agony in support of the album.

== Musical style and influences ==
Hatebreed's musical style has been described as metalcore and hardcore punk, They have blended influences from hardcore and punk rock, as well as heavy metal subgenres such as thrash metal and groove metal, alongside other bands in the 1990s metalcore scene (such as Earth Crisis, All Out War, Integrity and Converge). Jasta has also called Hatebreed "Celtic Frost hardcore".

The band's style merges classic hardcore with beatdown and metalcore, while also overtly referencing metal bands like Slayer. In a 2015 Metal Hammer article, writer Stephen Hill stated "The difference between Hatebreed and many of their influences is that where a band like Madball were happy to co-exist with metal bands without feeling like they were part of the same scene, Hatebreed actively went out of their way to become the hardcore band metal fans listen to."

According to Joe Davita of Loudwire, "lead singer Jamey Jasta's vocals lean on the beatdown grooves of the Connecticut band's music." He characterized Jasta's vocal deliver style as consisting of "deep, potent shouts." He also said Jasta's vocals "add an extra dimension to the quintet's aggro brand of metal."

Jasta's lyrics focus on more positive and uplifting messages in a 2016 interview, he explained, "I write a lot of positive lyrics because there's always hope, no matter what you're going through", and added, "I want to be able to sing songs for the next 10 years that will always remind me that life's worth living." Lyrical themes explored by the band include hatred and sadness.

Hatebreed's influences include metal and hardcore bands such as Agnostic Front, Carcass, Celtic Frost, the Cro-Mags, Earth Crisis, Entombed, Exodus, Integrity, Killing Time, Madball, Megadeth, Metal Church, Metallica, Obituary, Overkill, Pantera, Sepultura, Sheer Terror, Sick of It All, Slayer, Suicidal Tendencies and Testament.

Hatebreed is also known for their live performances and active touring schedule, since the band's inception in 1994 they have played over 3,000 shows worldwide.

== Controversies ==
In the mid-1990s, vocalist of emoviolence band In/Humanity, Chris Bickel, produced a zine calling out Victory Records for their business practices. Bickel attended a Hatebreed show and was quickly surrounded by the band, which threatened him with violence and called him homophobic slurs. After the show, frontman and vocalist Jamey Jasta declared himself a homophobe and again threatened Bickel with violence in a voicemail. In/Humanity played this voicemail to open their shows, and when Hatebreed played In/Humanity's hometown of Columbia, South Carolina, between-song banter included their hatred of Bickel and his band.

Hatebreed is a longtime sponsor of UFC fighter Chris Camozzi. At UFC 158 in Montreal on March 16, 2013, Camozzi claimed he was required by the UFC "for some reason" to cover Hatebreed's logos, on his T-shirt and ring introduction banner, with black tape.

In 2016, former drummer Nick "Nickel P" Papantoniou (a member of the band from 1996 to 1997) was sentenced to 45 years in prison after being convicted of felony murder. That conviction was overturned in January 2023 when it was discovered by Attorney James Ruane and proven at trial that Papantoniou's trial attorney had brokered a deal with the prosecution on behalf of another client to testify against Papantoniou and that deal was never disclosed to the court or Papantoniou. The court found Papantoniou's original attorney provided ineffective assistance of counsel and reversed the finding and ordered a new trial to occur.

=== Chris Beattie lawsuit ===
Following his dismissal from the band in 2024, Chris Beattie sued Hatebreed in July 2025. The lawsuit directly targeted lead singer Jamey Jasta, with Beattie accusing him of "increasingly erratic" behavior in the months leading up to his firing, ultimately making a "unilateral decision to cut Beattie off from his career, fans, touring, and substantial expected revenue." However, the lawsuit directly points to a 2015 agreement between himself, Jasta, and drummer Matthew Byrne that says they were each "entitled to 25% of the sales and revenue from merchandise while the other two members of the band received 12.5%, accounting for the remaining 25% of sales." On September 25, Hatebreed and Jasta filed their motion to have parts of Beattie's complaints stricken from the lawsuit. According to a report from Billboard, "the legal effort sought to paint the ex-bassist as a 'disgruntled former band member' who managed to erroneously assert[s] a right to remain a permanent member. That, however, flies in the face of what Hatebreed said was a relationship that was 'terminable at-will.'" Hatebreed's filing also stated that Beattie had signed a merchandise contract in 2015 together with Jasta and drummer Matthew Byrne. That deal outlined that each of the three would receive 25% of the merch income, while the remaining two members would each receive 12.5%. The group also emphasized that the agreement did not give Beattie any rights to the Hatebreed name.

== Legacy ==
Hatebreed have sold over 1.5 million records in North America, and have become a notable act within the hardcore scene and a stable in their home state of Connecticut. They have also been considered one of the pioneers and leading forces of the metalcore genre, alongside other bands such as Converge, Killswitch Engage, and Integrity. They are considered foundational to the development of metalcore due to their blending influences from hardcore and punk rock, as well as heavy metal subgenres such as thrash metal and groove metal. their album Satisfaction Is the Death of Desire is often cited as a landmark album in both hardcore and metalcore. Critics and fans regard it as a "hardcore classic." They have also been credited for bridging the gap between metal and hardcore, AllMusic credited them as one of the first acts to effectively meld hardcore and metal. In 2007 Hit Parader dubbed Hatebreed the greatest underground band of all time.

Bands such as Knocked Loose, All That Remains, Whitechapel, Terror, Ingested, Rise of the Northstar, The Acacia Strain, All Shall Perish, Parkway Drive and Trivium have all cited Hatebreed as a influence. Alternative Press named Hatebreed one of the most influential hardcore bands of all time stating that "seemingly every modern hardcore act have taken influence from Hatebreed in some way."

== Band members ==
Hatebreed live at With Full Force 2018

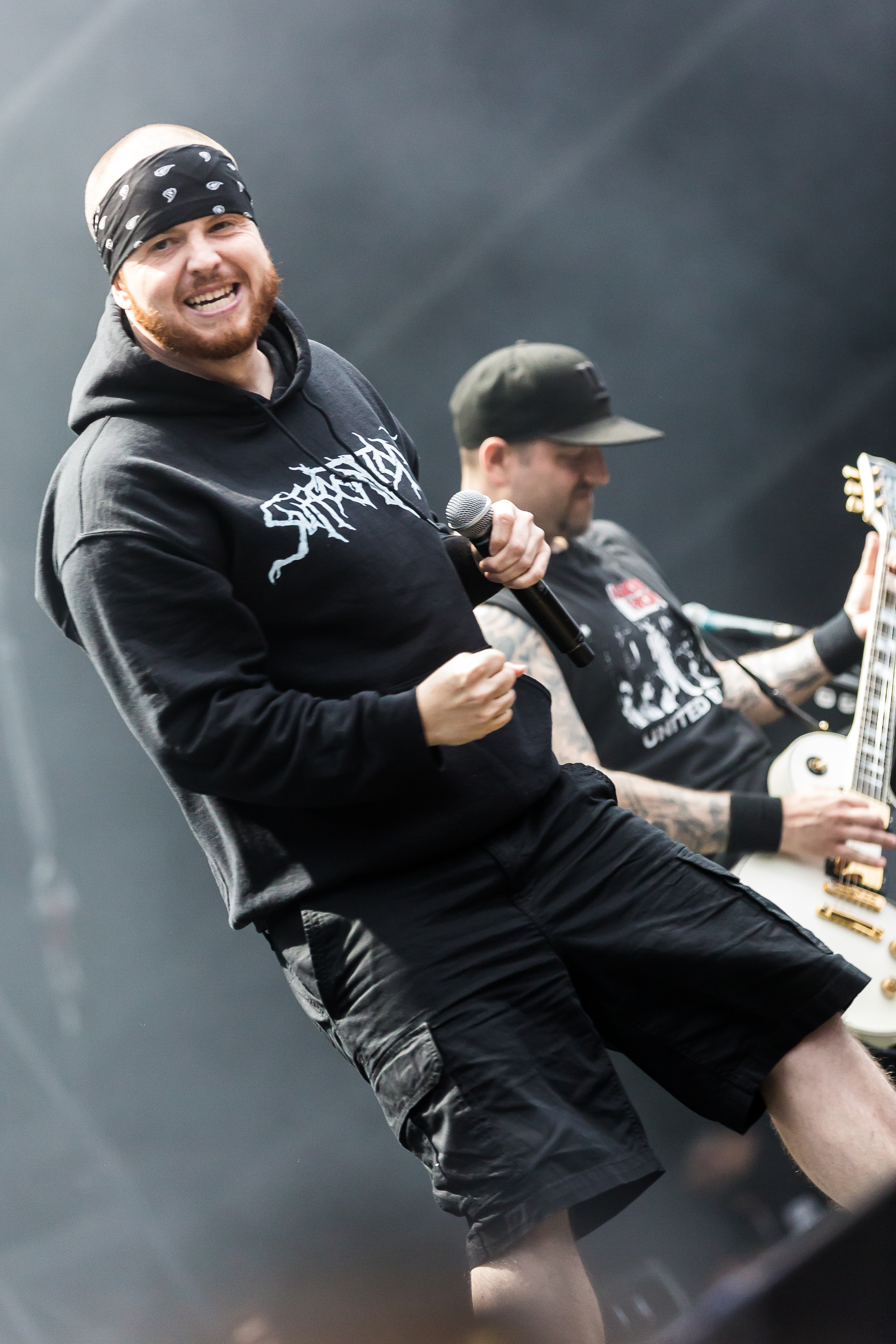
Jamey Jasta

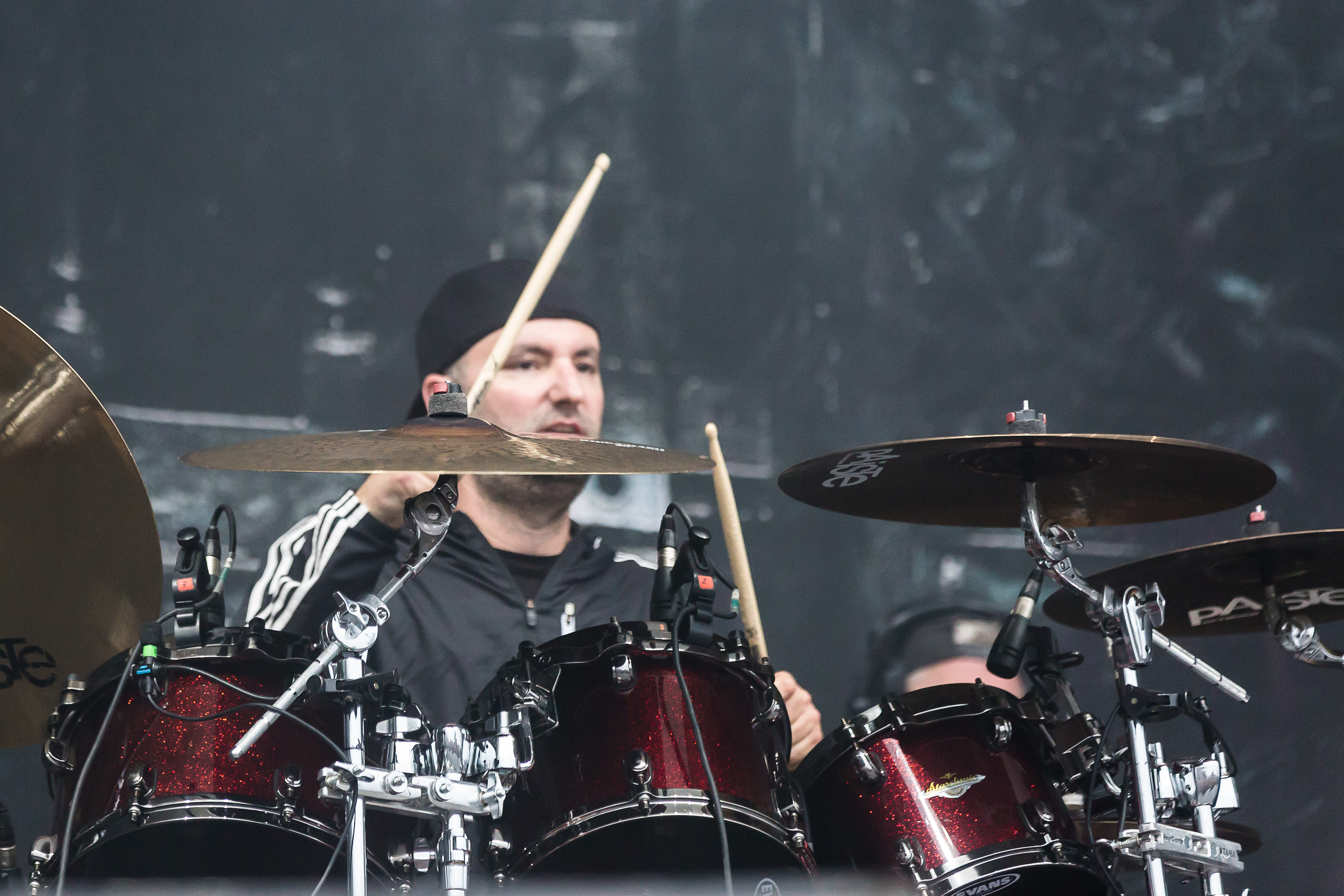
Matt Byrne

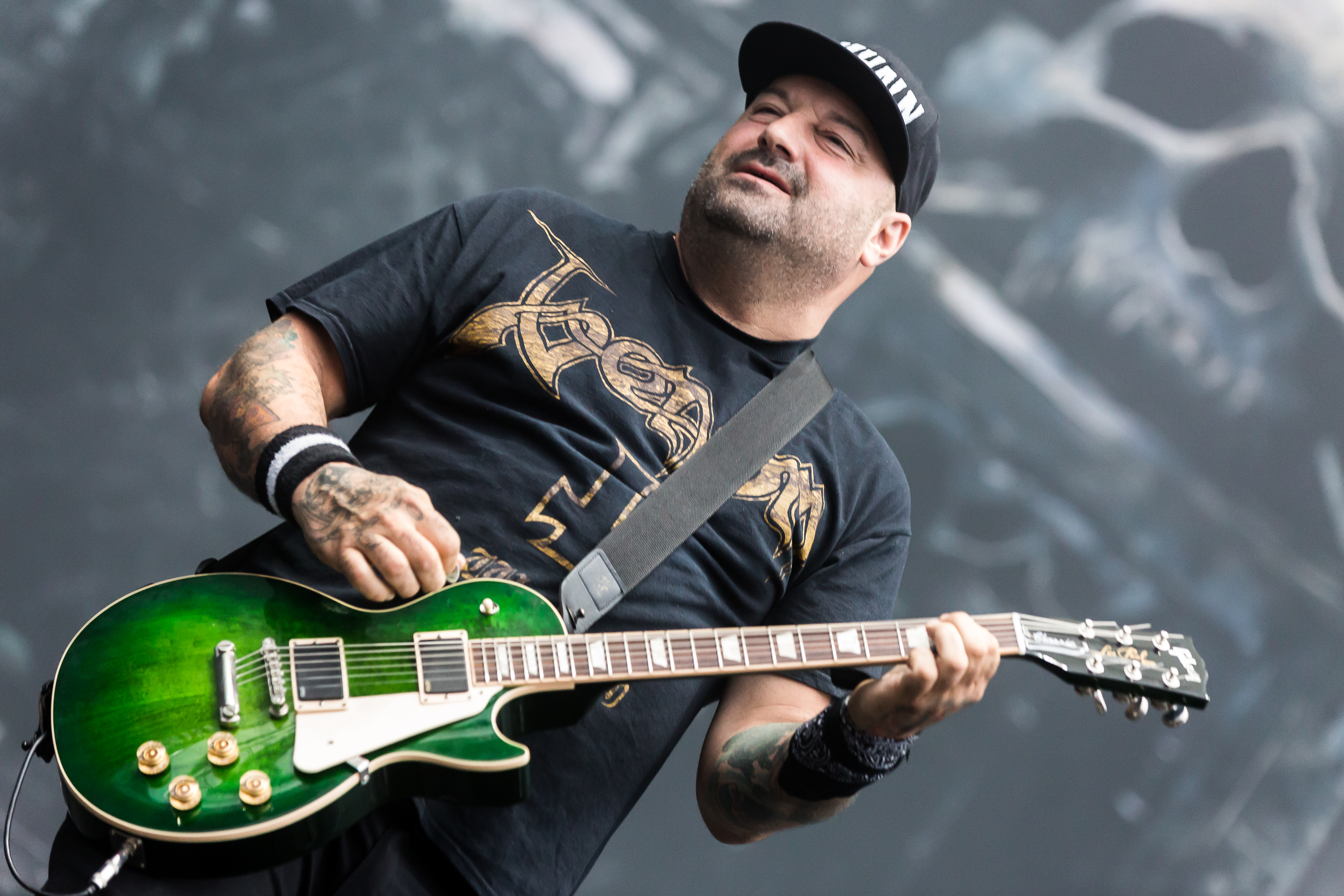
Frank Novinec

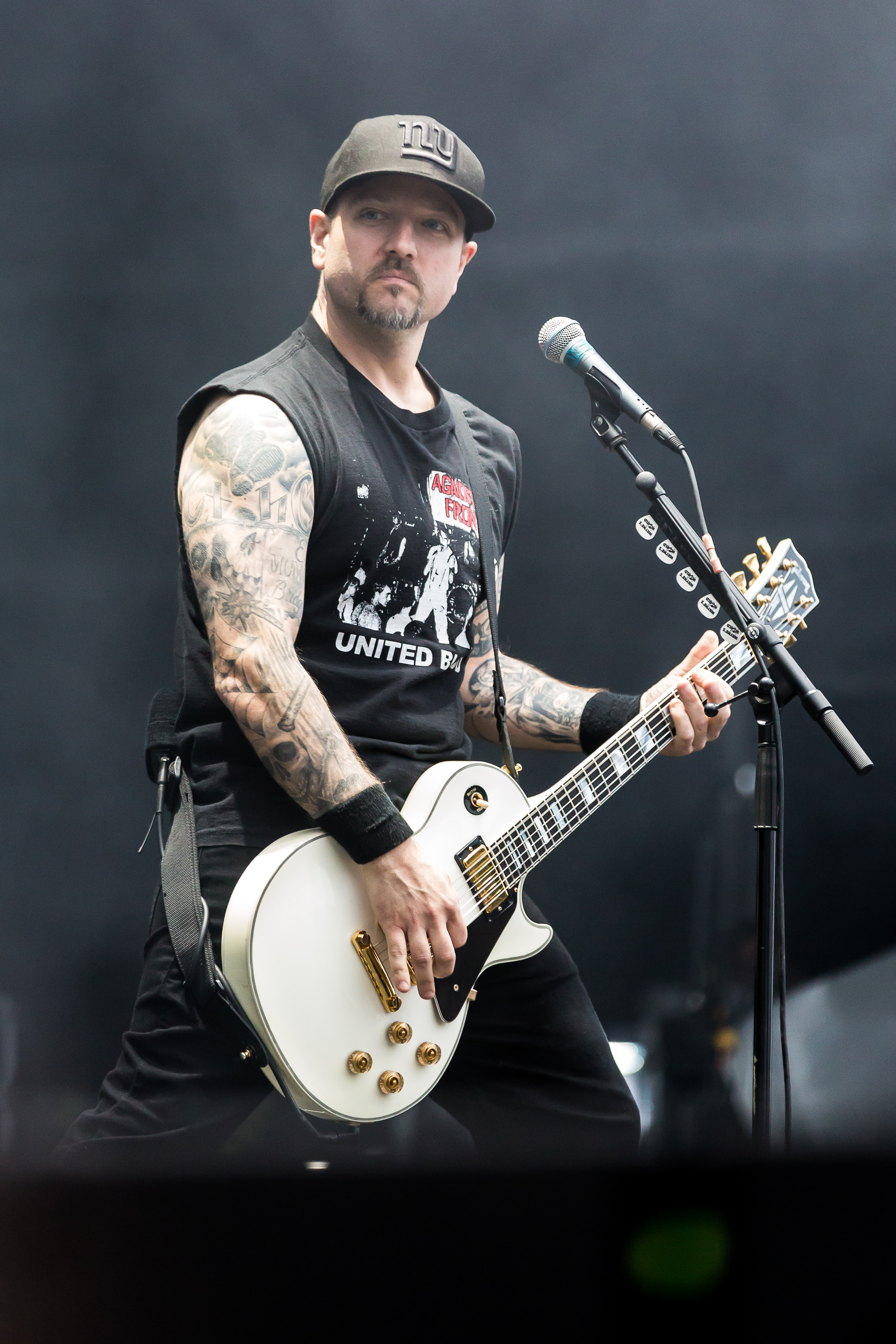
Wayne Lozinak

Current

- Jamey Jasta – lead vocals (1994–present)
- Matt Byrne – drums (2001–present)
- Frank Novinec – rhythm guitar, backing vocals (2006–present)
- Wayne Lozinak – lead guitar, backing vocals (1994–1996, 2009–present)
- Carl Schwartz – bass (2025–present)

Touring

- Matt Bachand – lead guitar (2025); bass (2025)

Former

- Larry Dwyer Jr. – rhythm guitar, backing vocals (1994–1996)
- Dave Russo – drums (1994–1996)
- Nick "Nickel P" Papantoniou – drums (1996–1997)
- Matt McIntosh – lead guitar, backing vocals (1996–1999)
- Jamie "Pushbutton" Muckinhaupt – drums (1997–1999)
- Rigg Ross – drums (1999–2001)
- Lou Richards – rhythm guitar, backing vocals (1996–2002; died 2006)
- Sean Martin – lead guitar, backing vocals (1999–2009); rhythm guitar (2002–2006)
- Chris Beattie – bass (1994–2024)

Timeline

== Discography ==
Studio albums

- Satisfaction Is the Death of Desire (1997)
- Perseverance (2002)
- The Rise of Brutality (2003)
- Supremacy (2006)
- Hatebreed (2009)
- The Divinity of Purpose (2013)
- The Concrete Confessional (2016)
- Weight of the False Self (2020)
- Fatal Paradox (2026)

== Awards and nominations ==
Grammy Award

Year	Nominee / work	Award	Result
2005	"Live for This"	Best Metal Performance	Nominated

Revolver

Year	Nominee / work	Award	Result
2011	Jamey Jasta	Revolver's 100 Greatest Living Rock Stars	Won

Loudwire Music Awards

Year	Nominee / work	Award	Result
2012	"Put It to the Torch"	Death Match Hall of Fame	Won

Revolver Golden Gods Awards

Year	Nominee / work	Award	Result
2013	Hatebreed	Best Live Act	Nominated
2016	Hatebreed	Best Live Band	Nominated

Rock Sound

Year	Nominee / work	Award	Result
2014	Perseverance	Rock Sound Hall of Fame	Inducted

Libera Awards

Year	Nominee / work	Award	Result
2013	Hatebreed	Best Live Act	Nominated
