= Supremacy (Hatebreed album) =

Studio album by Hatebreed
- Released: August 29, 2006
- Genre: Metalcore; hardcore punk
- Length: 36:23
- Label: Roadrunner
- Producer: Zeuss

Hatebreed chronology
The Rise of Brutality (2003)	Supremacy (2006)	For the Lions (2009)

Professional ratings
Review scores
Source	Rating
AllMusic	3.5/5 stars
Blabbermouth.net	7.5/10
Collector's Guide to Heavy Metal	5/10
IGN	6.2/10
MusicOMH	4/5 stars
Ultimate Guitar	8.3/10
PopMatters	7/10
Metal.de	7/10

Supremacy is the fourth studio album by American metalcore band Hatebreed. It is their first and only release with Roadrunner Records. The album was released on August 29, 2006. The track, "To the Threshold", earlier appeared on the album, MTV2 Headbangers Ball: The Revenge, released in April 2006.

Frontman Jamey Jasta contends that the main theme of Supremacy is overcoming "feelings of depression, guilt, sadness, anxiety, alienation. I wanted to show that there is hope, and you have to start with yourself. You can't help other people if you can't help yourself."

== Overview ==
The album was produced by Zeuss who had worked with the band on their previous album The Rise of Brutality. After releasing their two previous albums on the major label Universal, however the group decided to sign with Roadrunner for the release of Supremacy. Jamey Jasta stated this was due to the band wanting to sign with a label that was more involved with metal and hardcore bands.

The album’s lyrics focus on different adversities Jasta dealt with the previous two years. He claimed that with this record he opened himself up and wanted to be more personal.

In a press release Jasta commented on the album stating:

This album's just more charged, more focused, There are classic Hatebreed songs on here — ones I can see being in our set for years to come. I really set out when writing these songs with these guys [that] if it didn't make my hair stand up or give me chills down my spine, I didn't use it. I wanted to tap into pure adrenaline — the speed, the brutality, the breakdowns. I wanted to make a crushing record that was going to have a memorable impact on people.

When asked about the albums title Jasta commented:

It is about supremacy over the demons, the darkness, depression. It is the supremacy of self, personal power, power over one’s self, whatever it is that holds you back. So it is a multifaceted, very loaded word, that would really grab people’s attention, be like: „What’s this going to be about?“. That is why the booklet is going to be like twenty pages of just documenting two years of my life,

The album debuted at number 31 on the Billboard 200 selling 27,000 copies in its first week in the US. By August of 2007 the album had sold roughly 100,000 copies in the US.

Following the album’s release in September of 2006, Hatebreed headlined the US "Monsters of Mayhem" tour alongside Napalm Death and Exodus. The group then headlined a Canadian tour with Sworn Enemy and Scars Of Tomorrow in October and a European tour in November of that year alongside Unearth and Full Blown Chaos.

== Critical reception ==
Will Fry of IGN was critical of the band not evolving from previous efforts writing "Is this the only way that Hatebreed can "bare [their] soul?" Undoubtedly, fans will rejoice in the hell raised on Supremacy, but is Hatebreed immune to evolution? How can a band tour for ten years, and not move past their initial pedigree." Similarly a reviewer from Ultimate Guitar wrote "The music itself does not break any new ground as a whole, but many of the songs' breakdowns reveal some of the most inspired and well-written moments on the record. "Supremacy" will not likely go down in history as a monumental record, but in an industry that has become too much like an assembly line, Hatebreed offers a rare commodity: honesty." Blabbermouth.net added "The bottom line is that you will find in "Supremacy" exactly what you would expect from HATEBREED. Though not as memorable as the excellent "Perseverance", the album largely succeeds at giving the fans what they want."

As for the lyrics PopMatters wrote "While Jasta does tend to overdo it on every Hatebreed record (Supremacy comes with an extensive navel-gazing essay and detailed explanations of each song), his earnestness is hard to dislike, and for all the straightforwardness of his lyrics, he’s eloquent, passionate, and delivers positive messages to the kids."

== Track listing ==
No.	Title	Length
1.	"Defeatist"	3:19
2.	"Horrors of Self"	2:29
3.	"Mind Over All"	1:59
4.	"To the Threshold"	2:49
5.	"Give Wings to My Triumph"	3:05
6.	"Destroy Everything"	3:29
7.	"Divine Judgment"	2:28
8.	"Immortal Enemies"	2:29
9.	"The Most Truth"	2:44
10.	"Never Let It Die"	3:39
11.	"Spitting Venom"	2:49
12.	"As Diehard as They Come"	2:17
13.	"Supremacy of Self"	2:48

iTunes edition bonus track
No.	Title	Length
14.	"New Hate Rising"	2:36

Japanese edition bonus track
No.	Title	Length
14.	"Pollution of the Soul"	2:56

UK edition bonus track
No.	Title	Length
14.	"Severed"	2:43

== Credits ==
Musicians

- Jamey Jasta – vocals
- Sean Martin – lead guitar
- Frank Novinec – rhythm guitar
- Chris Beattie – bass
- Matt Byrne – drums
- Brendan Feeney – backing vocals
- Josh Grden – backing vocals
- Patrick Sullivan – backing vocals

Production

- Zeuss – producer, engineer, mixing
- Mike Gitter – A&R
- Ted Jensen – mastering
- Heather Baker – violin
- Meran Karanitant – artwork, layout design
- Daragh McDonagh – photography

== Charts ==
Chart (2006)	Peak position
ARIA Charts	32
Austria (Ö3 Austria Top 40)	64
Belgian Albums (Ultratop Flanders)	89
French Albums (SNEP)	112
German Albums (Offizielle Top 100)	52
Swiss Albums (Schweizer Hitparade)	95
Swedish Albums (Sverigetopplistan)	56
The Billboard 200	31
US Top Rock & Alternative Albums (Billboard)	10
US Top Rock Albums (Billboard)	10
US Indie Store Sales (Billboard)	12
9
