= Phil Anselmo discography =

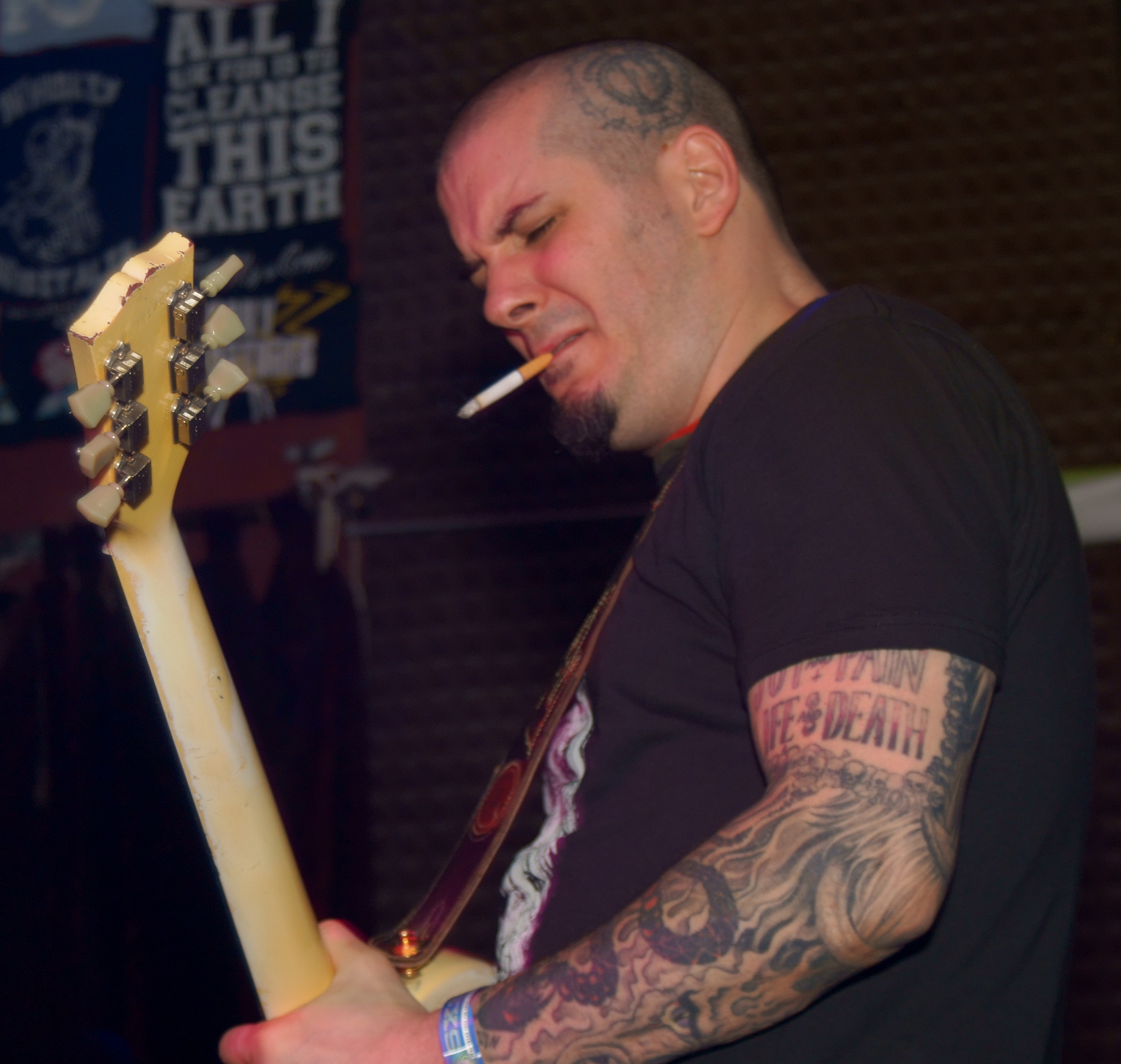
Anselmo in 2011

Phil Anselmo (born June 30, 1968 in New Orleans, Louisiana) is an American heavy metal vocalist who is best known as the frontman of Pantera, Down, and Superjoint.

== Discography ==
=== Philip H. Anselmo & The Illegals ===
| Title | Details | Peak chart positions | | | | Sales |
| Title | Details | US | BEL | FIN | UK | Sales |
|---|---|---|---|---|---|---|
| Walk Through Exits Only | Released: July 16, 2013; Label: Housecore, Season of Mist; Formats: CD, LP, digital download | 35 | 181 | 28 | 116 | US: 8,700 |
| Choosing Mental Illness as a Virtue | Released: January 26, 2018; Label: Housecore; Formats: CD, LP, digital download | 81 | 31 | 62 | 118 | US: 3,200 |
"—" denotes a recording that did not chart or was not released in that territory.

=== Christ Inversion ===
- Obey the Will of Hell (1994) (guitar and backing vocals)
- 13th Century Luciferian Rites (1995) (guitar and backing vocals)

=== Necrophagia ===
- Holocausto de la Morte (1998) (guitar)
- Black Blood Vomitorium EP (2000) (guitar)
- Cannibal Holocaust EP (2001) (guitar)
- Draped in Treachery (2005) (guitar)

=== Southern Isolation ===
- Southern Isolation EP (2001) (vocals, guitar)

=== Scour ===
- The Grey EP (2016) (vocals)
- The Red EP (2017) (vocals)
- The Black EP (2020) (vocals)
- Gold (2025) (vocals)

=== En Minor ===
- "On the Floor" / "There's a Long Way to Go" (single, 2019) (vocals)
- When the Cold Truth Has Worn Its Miserable Welcome Out (2020) (vocals)

=== Guest appearances ===
- With Crowbar – Crowbar (1993) (guest; producer)
- With Crowbar – Broken Glass (1996) (guest; backing vocals)
- With Anal Cunt – 40 More Reasons to Hate Us (1996) (guest; vocals and guitars)
- With Soilent Green – Sewn Mouth Secrets (1998) (guest; backing vocals)
- With Anthrax – Volume 8: The Threat Is Real (1998) (guest; backing vocals on "Killing Box")
- With Vision of Disorder – Imprint (1998) (guest; vocals on "By the River")
- With Iommi – Iommi (2000) (guest; vocals and lyrics on "Time Is Mine")
- With Biohazard – Uncivilization (2001) (guest; backing vocals on "HFFK")
- With Jarboe – Mahakali (2008) (guest; vocals on "Overthrown")
- With Metal Allegiance – Metal Allegiance (2015) (guest; vocals on "Dying Song")
- With Cattle Decapitation – The Anthropocene Extinction (2015) (guest; narration on "The Prophets of Loss")

=== Other releases ===
- 2017: Songs of Darkness and Despair (EP, as "Bill + Phil" with Bill Moseley) (vocals)
