= Down IV – Part I =

EP by Down
- Released: September 18, 2012
- Studios: Nodferatu's Lair, Louisiana
- Genres: Sludge metal; stoner metal; Southern metal
- Length: 33:18
- Labels: Down; Roadrunner
- Producers: Michael Thompson, Down

Down chronology
Diary of a Mad Band (2010)	Down IV – Part I (2012)	Down IV – Part II (2014)

Singles from Down IV – Part I
- 1. "Witchtripper" Released: July 31, 2012

Down IV – Part I (informally known as The Purple EP) is the first EP by American sludge metal band Down. It was released on September 18, 2012. It is the first album featuring bassist Pat Bruders due to the departure of former bassist Rex Brown in 2011, and the last until 2026's Volume V to feature guitarist Kirk Windstein, who initially left in 2013.

Part I was succeeded by Part II in 2014. In certain territories (mainly Japan), both EPs were combined as a singular album under the title Down IV.

== Background ==
In January 2012, vocalist Phil Anselmo announced that the band has been recording songs in the studio since October 2011. The band planned to release a series of EPs over the next few years. On May 21, 2012, Down performed "Misfortune Teller" for the first time in North Carolina. On July 26, 2012, another new song, "Witchtripper", was made available for streaming. It was released on iTunes on July 31, 2012. The band revealed the artwork and title of their first EP to be Down IV Part I – The Purple EP in July 2012.

== Lyrics and style ==
The band decided to go back to its roots and the style of writing that was most prominent on their debut album. "We're writing it like we did the first one," said Pepper Keenan. "Just get together in the jam room, right in each other's faces. That's how a lot of the classic rock bands worked; jamming it out, Deep Purple-style."

Much of the work was done at Phil Anselmo's barn "Nodferatu's Lair" in Louisiana, where the band also recorded their second album, Down II: A Bustle in Your Hedgerow. Influences such as Black Sabbath, Trouble, and Witchfinder General played a significant role in the writing process, with the EP containing traces of doom metal and Southern rock, giving it a dark, raw and ominous feel.

Anselmo described the album as:

"Very stripped down. Nothing flashy. Straight to the point… really just DOWN music. If you liked the first record, the demos… something like that… This record, we're pretty dead straight and honest and on the money as far as making it as simple and direct as possible and I think we did that. . . It has that practice-room vibe to it. We didn't really try and fucking slick it out and anything. We went the more raw route, as far as an approach."

The lyrics tackle subjects outside of just personal experiences unlike most of the band's previous work, exploring such themes as the faith and imperfection of mankind and cultural belief systems.

== Critical reception ==
Professional ratings
Review scores
Source	Rating
About.com	3.5/5 stars
Blabbermouth.net	8.5/10
Brave Words & Bloody Knuckles	9.0/10
CraveOnline	7.5/10
Exclaim!	favorable
Loudwire	5/5 stars
PopMatters	6/10

The EP was received well by critics. Artistdirect.com and Loudwire both giving the EP a perfect 5 out of 5 star rating. Natalie Zed of About.com gave the album 3.5 out of 5 stars in her review. She stated:

"While the sound of this record is classic Down, delivered without experimentation or flourish, the form of the album is where the band allow themselves freedom to explore, and very successfully. The Purple EP is at once extremely satisfying, but also leaves the listener hungry and wanting more – a fine balance."

== Commercial performance ==
Released on September 18, 2012, nearly 17 years after their debut album NOLA, The Purple EP debut on the Billboard 200 at number 35, number 15 on the Rock Albums chart, number 7 on the Independent Albums chart, and topped the Hard Rock Albums chart all in the week on October 6, 2012. The album peaked at number 57 on the UK Albums Chart.

== Track listing ==
All lyrics are written by Phil Anselmo; all music is composed by Down.

No.	Title	Length
1.	"Levitation"	4:58
2.	"Witchtripper"	3:49
3.	"Open Coffins"	5:43
4.	"The Curse Is a Lie"	6:00
5.	"This Work Is Timeless"	3:43
6.	"Misfortune Teller" (The song "Misfortune Teller" ends at minute 7:05. After 1 minute and 30 seconds of silence [7:05 – 8:35], an untitled hidden song starts.)	9:05
Total length:		33:18

== Personnel ==
- Phil Anselmo − lead vocals
- Pepper Keenan − guitar
- Kirk Windstein − guitar
- Pat Bruders − bass
- Jimmy Bower − drums

== Charts ==
Year	Chart	Position
2012	U.S. Billboard 200	35
2012	UK Albums Chart	57
