= Diary of a Mad Band: Europe in the Year of VI =

Live album (CD/DVD) by Down
- Released: October 5, 2010
- Genres: Sludge metal; stoner metal; Southern metal
- Length: Disc 1: 50:25; Disc 2: 50:35
- Labels: Roadrunner, Warner

Down chronology
Over the Under (2007)	Diary of a Mad Band: Europe in the Year of VI (2010)	Down IV – Part I (2012)

Professional ratings
Review scores
Source	Rating
411mania.com	9/10 stars
AllMusic	3/5 stars

Diary of a Mad Band: Europe in the Year of VI is a live album by sludge/Southern metal band Down. It was released on CD/DVD on October 5, 2010. It is the final Down album to feature Rex Brown as bassist.

== Content ==
Diary of a Mad Band features a two-CD full concert recorded in London. The 130-minute DVD features footage documenting the 2006 return of Down from the practice room through the band's first European tour, and a bonus behind-the-scenes featurette entitled "Tyrades and Shananigans".

The album is often mislabeled as "Down IV" as it is the fourth release by Down, although it is not a studio album. Another reason for this is that on the album's artwork, the Roman numeral for 6 (VI) is present. The Roman numeral for 6 is present because the album was recorded in 2006 (In the year of VI).

The vinyl release features completely different artwork under the title Threefold Live.

== Legal issues and delay ==
The live album was originally set for release on March 23, 2010. However, due to legal issues the album's release date was pushed back to October 5.

== Track listing ==
=== Disc 1 ===
No.	Title	Recorded	Length
1.	"Losing All"	London, England	5:06
2.	"Lifer"	London, England	5:44
3.	"Lysergik Funeral Procession"	London, England	2:53
4.	"Rehab"	London, England	6:09
5.	"Temptations Wings"	London, England	6:05
6.	"Ghosts Along the Mississippi"	London, England	7:07
7.	"Learn from This Mistake"	London, England	8:22
8.	"Hail the Leaf"	London, England	4:19
9.	"New Orleans Is a Dying Whore"	London, England	4:45
Total length:			50:25

=== Disc 2 ===
No.	Title	Recorded	Length
10.	"Lies, I Don't Know What They Say But..."	London, England	7:21
11.	"Underneath Everything"	London, England	5:19
12.	"The Seed"	London, England	4:26
13.	"Eyes of the South"	London, England	7:36
14.	"Jail"	London, England	6:33
15.	"Stone the Crow"	London, England	7:30
16.	"Bury Me in Smoke"	London, England	11:55
Total length:			50:35

== Credits ==
Down

- Phil Anselmo – vocals
- Pepper Keenan – guitars
- Kirk Windstein – guitars
- Jimmy Bower – drums
- Rex Brown – bass

Other

- Layout and design – Pepper Keenan and Vance Kelly
- Artwork – Vance Kelly

== Tour dates ==
Date	City	Country	Venue
May 19, 2006	Hamburg	Germany	Grosse Freiheit
May 20, 2006	Cologne	Germany	Live Music Hall
May 21, 2006	Tilburg	Netherlands	013
May 23, 2006	Birmingham	England	Carling Academy
May 24, 2006	Nottingham	England	Rock City
May 25, 2006	Newcastle	England	Newcastle University
May 27, 2006	Glasgow	Scotland	ABC
May 28, 2006	Manchester	England	Manchester Academy
May 29, 2006	London	England	London Astoria
May 30, 2006	London	England	London Astoria
June 1, 2006	Milan	Italy	Gods of Metal, Idroscalo
June 2, 2006	Zurich	Switzerland	Rohstofflager
June 3, 2006	Paris	France	Élysée Montmartre
June 5, 2006	Oslo	Norway	Rockefeller
June 6, 2006	Stockholm	Sweden	Arenan
June 7, 2006	Copenhagen	Denmark	Vega
June 8, 2006	Tampere	Finland	Pakkahuone
June 10, 2006	Castle Donington	England	Download Festival
June 12, 2006	Belfast	Northern Ireland	Mandela
June 13, 2006	Dublin	Ireland	Ambassador Theatre
June 24, 2006	New Orleans	United States	Tipitina's

Note: Dates June 12, 13, and 24 do not appear on the album.
