= House of Shock =

Seasonal haunted attraction located in New Orleans, Louisiana

The House of Shock is a seasonal haunted attraction located in the Greater New Orleans area. Every year, the House is opened on weekends in October. It is known for its satanic themes and intensity by New Orleans residents and tourists. The name "House of Shock" is a reference to the show of the popular long-time local horror host, Morgus the Magnificent.

Following a 2014 shutdown, the House of Shock opened again in 2015. In 2017, the House was permanently closed after 25 years of service and was replaced with New Orleans Nightmare.

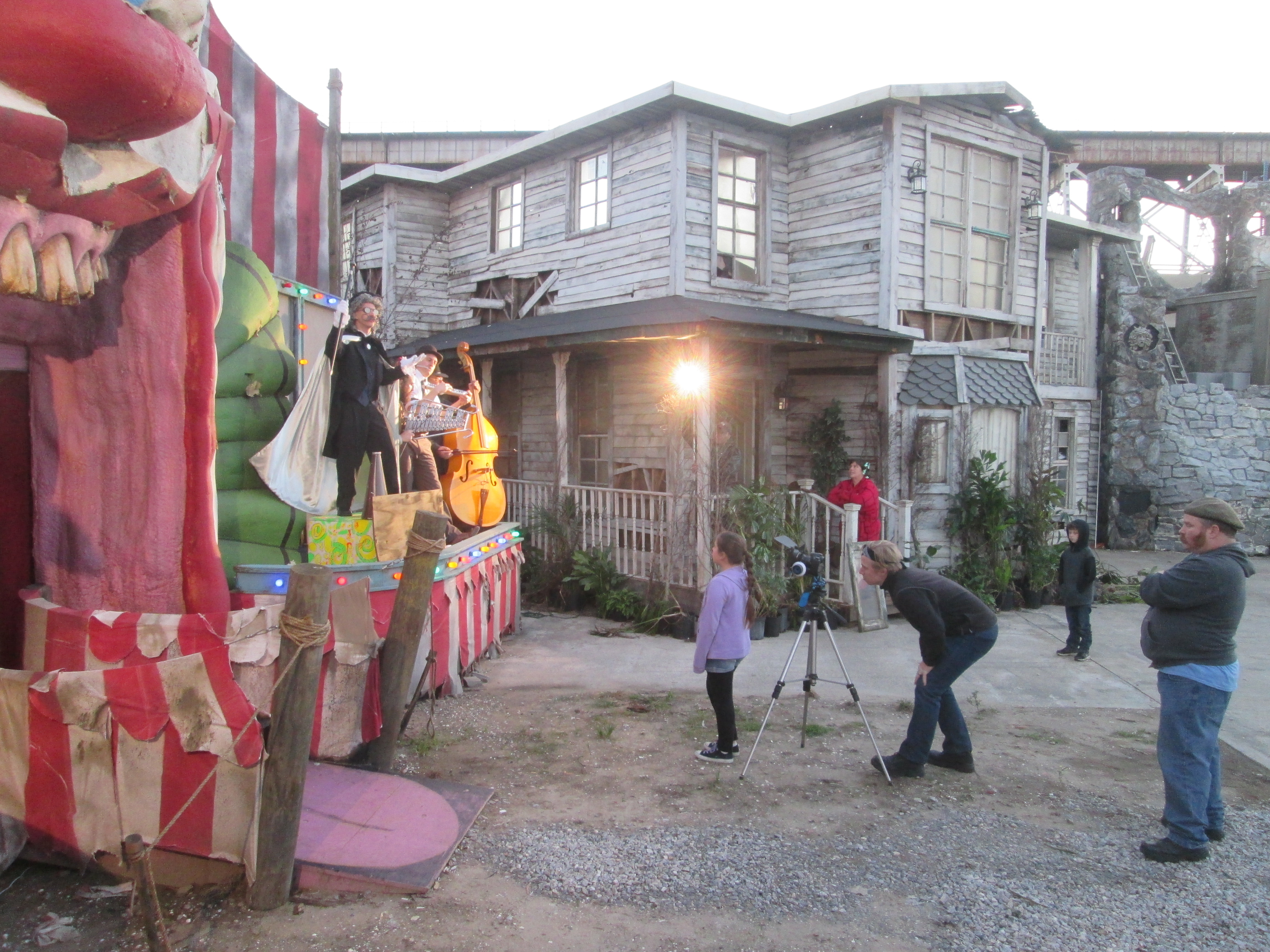
Music video shoot at the House of Shock in Elmwood, Louisiana in 2025.

== History ==
Founded by Pantera's frontman Phil Anselmo and friends, the House of Shock started in 1992 in Gracianette's backyard. In 1993 it moved to Gracianette's grandmother's backyard to allow for more room. During that year, local officials informed the group that if they wanted to continue they would need to move to a commercial location. The owners rented a warehouse on Baronne St. and brought in Steven Joseph to help manage the attraction. However, local officials attempted to shut down the attraction due to a room representing the Church of Satan, giving City Council cause to believe that the House of Shock was inappropriate for public viewing. The House of Shock operated in a different location close to the old location and was considered by many to be one of the best haunted houses in the United States.

== The attraction ==
The horror show starts off with a pyrotechnic stage show complete with actors. After the show, guests walk through a zombie infested graveyard and funeral parlor, followed by the morgue and the swamp. After being stained with blood, guests move on to the Church of Satan, which is largely the center of controversy regarding House of Shock. Once out of the church, guests are immediately pursued by actors armed with fake chainsaws.

According to Karpelman, one woman died of a heart attack but was revived by Danneel Miller-Larkin and taken to the hospital by paramedics shortly thereafter.

== Scenes ==
- Graveyard of Your Doom
- Funeral Parlor
- Voodoo Shop
- French Quarter
- Butcher Shop
- Cattle Run
- Meat Packing Plant
- Taxidermy
- Swamp
- Sewer
- Sensory
- Spinning Tunnel
- Dark Halls
- Catacombs
- Church
- Hell
- Chainsaw Maze

== The Church of Satan ==
The room itself is in no way based on the actual satanic church, but is mainly a depiction of what a church dedicated to Satan might look like.

== Media ==
The House of Shock was featured on the "Night of the Living Possums" episode of A&E's Billy the Exterminator, taped in late 2010 and televised March 10, 2012. This episode featured Billy and Ricky rid the haunted house of wild possums before it opens for the season.

The House of Shock appeared in the 2007 Travel Channel special Halloween's Most Extreme.

The House was featured in Goatwhore's 2014 music video for their song "Baring Teeth for Revolt". Shock rock band Gwar also used House of Shock as the set for their music video "Eighth Lock".

In 1995, the House of Shock was featured on an exclusive video entitled Video Backlash by Purgatory Productions. The video's main showcase was the NOLA sludge metal scene at the time that featured performances of bands Down, Crowbar, Acid Bath, Soilent Green and more.
