= Down II: A Bustle in Your Hedgerow =

Down II: A Bustle in Your Hedgerow...

Studio album by Down
- Released: March 26, 2002
- Recorded: November 2001
- Studios: Nodferatu's Lair, Louisiana
- Genres: Sludge metal; stoner metal; Southern rock
- Length: 65:58
- Label: Elektra
- Producers: Warren Riker and Down

Down chronology
NOLA (1995)	Down II: A Bustle in Your Hedgerow... (2002)	Over the Under (2007)

Singles from Down II: A Bustle in Your Hedgerow...
- 1. "Beautifully Depressed" Released: 2002; 2. "Ghosts Along the Mississippi" Released: 2002

Down II: A Bustle in Your Hedgerow... is the second studio album by American stoner metal band Down, released on March 26, 2002. The subtitle "A Bustle in Your Hedgerow..." is borrowed from the lyrics of "Stairway to Heaven" by Led Zeppelin.

== Background ==
Down II was the band's first album in seven years since the release of NOLA, the longest gap between all of their studio albums at the time. Being a supergroup, the band went on hiatus in 1996 so that members could focus on their main bands (namely Eyehategod, Corrosion of Conformity, Crowbar, and Pantera). Down reformed in 1999 with Pantera bassist Rex Brown replacing Todd Strange. The band wanted the album to have a "bluesy" feel, so they moved into Phil Anselmo's barn for the recording.

The album was originally titled 'The Backwood Heavies'.

Also in 2002, the band recorded an acoustic version of "Stone the Crow" that was never officially released although it can be heard on YouTube.

== Critical reception ==
Professional ratings
Review scores
Source	Rating
AllMusic	2/5 stars
Metal Hammer	8/10 stars
Rock Hard	9.5/10
Rock Sound	4/5 stars

Down II was not received as well as the band's debut release, NOLA. Blabbermouth reviewer Borivoj Krgin stated, "Down II appears to have been thrown together more haphazardly, with much of the material falling short of the standard set by Down's classic debut offering." However, UK critics were more enthusiastic, with Metal Hammer awarding the album 8/10 and Rock Sound declaring it "a storming experience from the depths" and rating it at 4/5. Despite its poor US reviews, the album debuted at number 44 on the Billboard 200.

=== Accolades ===
Publication	Country	Accolade	Year	Rank
Metal Hammer	United Kingdom	"Albums of the Year"	2002	4
Kerrang!	United Kingdom	"Albums of the Year"	2002	14
Terrorizer	United Kingdom	"Albums of the Year"	2002	20
Rock Hard	Germany	"The 500 Greatest Rock & Metal Albums of All Time"	2005	319

== Track listing ==
No.	Title	Writer(s)	Length
1.	"Lysergik Funeral Procession"	Phil Anselmo, Jimmy Bower, Pepper Keenan, Kirk Windstein	3:10
2.	"There's Something on My Side"	Anselmo, Keenan, Windstein	5:21
3.	"The Man That Follows Hell"	Anselmo, Keenan	4:33
4.	"Stained Glass Cross"	Anselmo, Bower, Keenan	3:36
5.	"Ghosts Along the Mississippi"	Anselmo, Bower, Rex Brown, Keenan, Windstein	5:06
6.	"Learn from This Mistake"	Anselmo, Brown, Keenan	7:14
7.	"Beautifully Depressed"	Anselmo, Bower, Keenan, Windstein	4:52
8.	"Where I'm Going"	Anselmo, Keenan	3:10
9.	"Doobinterlude" (instrumental)	Bower	1:50
10.	"New Orleans Is a Dying Whore"	Anselmo, Bower, Keenan, Windstein	4:15
11.	"The Seed"	Anselmo, Bower, Keenan	4:21
12.	"Lies, I Don't Know What They Say But..."	Anselmo, Brown, Keenan	6:21
13.	"Flambeaux's Jamming with St. Aug" (instrumental)	Bower	0:59
14.	"Dog Tired"	Anselmo, Bower, Keenan	3:21
15.	"Landing on the Mountains of Meggido"	Anselmo	7:49
Total length:			65:58

== Personnel ==
Down

- Phil Anselmo – vocals, guitar on "Landing on the Mountains of Meggido"
- Pepper Keenan – guitar
- Kirk Windstein – guitar
- Rex Brown – bass
- Jimmy Bower – drums, all instruments on "Doobinterlude"

Additional musicians

- Stephanie Opal Weinstein – backing vocals on "Landing on the Mountains of Meggido"

== Charts ==
Year	Chart	Position
2002	Billboard 200	44
2002	German Album Charts	67

== Tour ==
To support the album, Down toured on the second stage of Ozzfest in 2002. They also scheduled an 18-date tour that began May 1 in New York and ended on May 25 in Dallas. After the December 1st show in Texas, the band once again entered an hiatus to focus on their respective bands until May 19, 2006.

Date	City	Country	Venue
April 28, 2002	Birmingham	United States	Five Points Music Hall
April 29, 2002	Atlanta	United States	The Roxy
May 1, 2002	New York City	United States	Roseland Ballroom
May 2, 2002	Philadelphia	United States	Trocadero
May 3, 2002	Worcester	United States	The Palladium
May 5, 2002	Cleveland	United States	The Odeon
May 6, 2002	Cincinnati	United States	Bogart's
May 7, 2002	Columbus	United States	Newport Music Hall
May 9, 2002	Grand Rapids	United States	The Orbit Room
May 10, 2002	Detroit	United States	Harpo's
May 11, 2002	Chicago	United States	House of Blues
May 13, 2002	Minneapolis	United States	Quest Club
May 15, 2002	Denver	United States	Ogden Theater
May 17, 2002	Las Vegas	United States	House of Blues
May 18, 2002	West Hollywood	United States	House of Blues
May 19, 2002	San Francisco	United States	The Fillmore
May 21, 2002	Scottsdale	United States	Cajun House
May 23, 2002	San Antonio	United States	Sunset Station
May 24, 2002	Houston	United States	Sunset Station
May 25, 2002	Dallas	United States	Deep Ellum Live
