= Right Place, Wrong Time (song) =

1973 single by Dr. John

Single by Dr. John

from the album In the Right Place
- B-side: "I Been Hoodood"
- Released: April 1973
- Recorded: 1972
- Genre: Blue-eyed soul; New Orleans R&B; funk
- Length: 2:50
- Label: Atco
- Songwriter: Mac Rebennack
- Producer: Allen Toussaint

Dr. John singles chronology
"Iko Iko" (1972)	"Right Place, Wrong Time" (1973)	"Such a Night" (1973)

Official audio
- "Right Place, Wrong Time" on YouTube

"Right Place, Wrong Time" is a song by American musician Dr. John. It was the first single from his sixth album, In the Right Place, and became his biggest hit single.

During the summer of 1973, the song peaked at number nine on the U.S. Billboard Hot 100. It is ranked as the 24th biggest hit of 1973. In Canada, the song reached number six.

Some of the lines came from contributions by Bob Dylan, Bette Midler and Doug Sahm. A verse lyric from the song ("Just need a little brain salad surgery/got to cure my insecurity") was the inspiration for the title of the album Brain Salad Surgery by the English progressive rock band Emerson, Lake & Palmer, replacing the working title of Whip Some Skull on Yer. Both titles are slang expressions for fellatio.

== Personnel ==
- Dr. John – lead vocals

The Meters

- Art Neville – organ
- Leo Nocentelli – lead guitar
- George Porter Jr. – bass guitar
- Zigaboo Modeliste – drums

Additional personnel

- Gary Brown – saxophone
- Robbie Montgomery – backing vocals
- Jessie Smith – backing vocals
- David Spinozza – guitar solo
- Allen Toussaint – piano, percussion, rhythm guitar, horn arrangements

== Chart history ==
=== Weekly charts ===
Chart (1973)	Peak position
Australia (Kent Music Report)	98
Canada Top Singles (RPM)	6
US Billboard Hot 100	9
US Cash Box Top 100	11

=== Year-end charts ===
Chart (1973)	Rank
Canada	70
US Billboard	24

== Use in media ==
"Right Place, Wrong Time" was included in the soundtrack of the 2000 comedy film Lucky Numbers. The song was featured in an episode of American Horror Story: Coven, an episode of That '70s Show, and in the movies Dazed and Confused (1993) and Fun with Dick and Jane (2005). In 2008, the song was included in the How I Met Your Mother fourth-season finale "Right Place, Right Time". It also appeared over the opening credits in the film Sahara, as well as the trailer for the second season of Fargo.

It was included in the soundtrack to the 2010 video game Skate 3 and as well as in Black Lightning (S3:E7).

The intro was sampled by Dr. Dre and used in the intro to the movie Deep Cover.

It was used in trailers for the television series Poker Face.

== Cover versions ==
The Jon Spencer Blues Explosion covered the song, releasing it on Acme Plus, the UK version of Xtra-Acme USA. This version appeared on the Scream 2 soundtrack, and the film's title, together with the names of stars Neve Campbell and Jada Pinkett, can be heard shouted several times during the intro.

The Screamin' Cheetah Wheelies recorded it for their album Magnolia (Capricorn Records, 1996).

James Booker included it on his album Gonzo: Live 1976 as a medley with "Desitively Bonnaroo".

Dave Matthews Band covered it with special guests Preservation Hall Jazz Band as a tribute to Dr. John, following his death, at Alpine Valley Music Theatre on July 5, 2019.

B. B. King and Bonnie Raitt contributed a version for the soundtrack to the film Air America.

The band Down released a cover of the track ahead of Mardi Gras 2026.
