= Volume V (album) =

Studio album by Down
- Released: November 20, 2026
- Length: 56:33
- Label: Nuclear Blast

Down chronology
Down IV – Part II (2014)	Volume V (2026)

Singles from Volume V
- 1. "Blood Oath" Released: August 19, 2026; 2. "The Myth" Released: October 7, 2026

Volume V is the fourth studio album by American stoner metal band Down, released on November 20, 2026, through Nuclear Blast Records. It is the band's first full-length studio album since Over the Under (2007), marking their longest gap between studio albums to date. The album was preceded by the single "Blood Oath" that was released in August 2026.

== Track listing ==
No.	Title	Length
1.	"The Myth"	5:17
2.	"Merciful Fate" (featuring King Diamond)	7:00
3.	"Turn Out the Light"	3:53
4.	"The Message"	4:37
5.	"Causeway Grief"	7:13
6.	"Blood Oath"	5:23
7.	"They Walk the Night"	7:06
8.	"They Came from Dust"	4:29
9.	"Ozz"	4:32
10.	"Twice-Told Tales"	7:03
Total length:		56:33

== Personnel ==
=== Down ===
- Phil Anselmo – vocals
- Pepper Keenan – guitar
- Kirk Windstein – guitar
- Pat Bruders – bass
- Jimmy Bower – drums

=== Special guests ===
- King Diamond and Livia Zita – vocals on "Merciful Fate"

=== Production ===
- Produced by Eddie Mapp and Down
- Mixed by Dave Fortman
- Mastered by Maor Appelbaum at Maor Appelbaum Mastering
- Vocals tracked by John Jarvis
