= Down IV – Part II =

EP by Down
- Released: May 13, 2014
- Studios: Nodferatu's Lair, Louisiana
- Genres: Sludge metal; stoner metal; Southern metal
- Length: 36:44
- Labels: Down Records, Independent Label Group
- Producers: Michael Thompson, Down

Down chronology
Down IV – Part I (2012)	Down IV – Part II (2014)	Volume V (2026)

Professional ratings
Aggregate scores
Source	Rating
Metacritic	84/100
Review scores
Source	Rating
AllMusic	3/5 stars
Alternative Press	4/5 stars
Exclaim!	(9/10)
The Guardian	4/5 stars
Kerrang!	5/5 stars

Down IV – Part II is the second EP by American sludge metal band Down. It was released in May 2014 via Down Records. It is the only release by the band featuring guitarist Bobby Landgraf, who replaced founding member Kirk Windstein in 2013, before Windstein returned to the band in late 2019. The album was recorded in frontman Phil Anselmo's home studio Nodferatu's Lair in Louisiana.

Part II was preceded by Part I in 2012. In certain territories (mainly Japan), both EPs were combined as a singular album under the title Down IV.

== Track listing ==
All tracks are written by Down.

No.	Title	Length
1.	"Steeple"	5:45
2.	"We Knew Him Well..."	4:04
3.	"Hogshead/Dogshead"	3:52
4.	"Conjure"	8:31
5.	"Sufferer's Years"	5:37
6.	"Bacchanalia"	8:55
Total length:		36:44

== Personnel ==
- Phil Anselmo − vocals
- Pepper Keenan − guitar
- Bobby Landgraf − guitar
- Pat Bruders − bass
- Jimmy Bower − drums

Production

- Produced by Michael Thompson and Down
- Engineered by Michael Thompson and Stephen "The Big Fella" Berrigan
- Mixed by Michael Thompson and Phil Anselmo, assisted by Stephen Berrigan
- Mastered by Eric Conn
