= Choosing Mental Illness as a Virtue =

Studio album by Philip H. Anselmo & The Illegals
- Released: January 26, 2018
- Genres: Blackened death metal; death metal
- Length: 46:23
- Label: Housecore
- Producer: Phil Anselmo

Philip H. Anselmo & The Illegals chronology
Walk Through Exits Only (2013)	Choosing Mental Illness as a Virtue (2018)

Choosing Mental Illness as a Virtue is the second solo album by American metal vocalist Phil Anselmo. Credited to Phillip H. Anselmo & the Illegals, the album was released on January 26, 2018 under Anselmo's own label, Housecore Records.

== Reception ==
The album has received generally positive reviews from music critics.

== Track list ==
No.	Title	Length
1.	"Little Fucking Heroes"	3:46
2.	"Utopian"	3:41
3.	"Choosing Mental Illness"	3:20
4.	"The Ignorant Point"	3:28
5.	"Individual"	6:49
6.	"Delinquent"	4:27
7.	"Photographic Taunts"	4:06
8.	"Finger Me"	5:38
9.	"Invalid Columbrine Frauds"	4:01
10.	"Mixed Lunatic Results"	6:57
Total length:		46:23

== Personnel ==
=== Philip H. Anselmo & The Illegals ===
- Phil Anselmo − vocals, guitars
- Steve Taylor − guitars
- Mike De Leon − lead guitars
- Walter Howard IV − bass
- Joe Gonzalez − drums
