= Stone the Crow =

Single by Down

from the album NOLA
- Released: September 1995
- Genre: Southern metal
- Length: 4:42
- Label: East West
- Songwriters: Phil Anselmo, Pepper Keenan
- Producers: Down, Matt Thomas

Down singles chronology
"Lifer" (1995)	"Stone the Crow" (1995)	"Temptation's Wings" (1995)

"Stone the Crow" is a song by American heavy metal band Down and a single from their 1995 debut album, NOLA. It peaked at No. 40 on the US Mainstream Rock charts. A video was also produced for the song.

== Music video ==
In an interview, guitarist Pepper Keenan was asked about the music video:

"We recorded that at a bar in Des Allemands, Louisiana. It was at a little bar and a place they called the shrimp boat graveyard. That was a trip doing that guitar solo on top of a half sunken shrimp boat. But yeah, we recorded that record at Ultrasonic Studio. Its a shame that that place is gone now. Anyway, it was the year we had the May flood. There's a picture of us in there with all our guitars on and water up to our knees. Yeah, that was a whole other story. I remember that Clarence "Gatemouth" Brown was recording there at the same time we were, and I helped him load his gear into the studio. He had a 45 strapped on his side, and he was smoking a pipe, and let me tell you it was not tobacco. That was kicks."

== Release and reception ==
The song was released as the second single for the band's debut album and became their first and only radio hit, reaching No. 40 on the US Mainstream Rock Tracks. The song is a staple at live shows and is regularly played as the second to last song.

== Acoustic Version ==
In 2002 the band recorded an acoustic version of "Stone the Crow" that was never officially released although it can be heard on YouTube.

== Chart positions ==
Chart (1995)	Peak position
US Mainstream Rock (Billboard)	40
