= Over the Under =

Studio album by Down
- Released: September 25, 2007
- Recorded: December 2006 – February 2007
- Genres: Sludge metal; stoner metal; Southern metal
- Length: 59:54
- Labels: Independent Label Group, Warner, Roadrunner
- Producers: Warren Riker, Down

Down chronology
Down II: A Bustle in Your Hedgerow (2002)	Over the Under (2007)	Diary of a Mad Band (2010)

Singles from Over the Under
- 1. "Mourn" Released: September 25, 2007; 2. "I Scream" Released: October 22, 2007; 3. "On March the Saints" Released: 2008

Over the Under, also referred to as Down III: Over the Under, is the third studio album by American heavy metal band Down, released five years after their previous album, Down II: A Bustle in Your Hedgerow. It was released internationally on September 24, 2007, and in the United States on September 25, 2007.

== Themes ==
Lyrical themes of Over the Under include the band's anger about Hurricane Katrina, Phil Anselmo's frustration over the murder of Pantera guitarist Dimebag Darrell, and the bad blood between the two up until the guitarist's death.

"Phil's really good at [lyrics], Several songs address Katrina's aftermath and how life changes on you, man. We've got a lot of ammunition for this one, I'll put it that way — a lot of things have not necessarily gone right for everybody these last couple of years. Everybody's just trying to stay positive. We're not writing Christian songs. These are still angry, frustrated songs." – Pepper Keenan

"We've progressed a lot, but we didn't forget those first Down demos. ...We still get off on those big, giant, heavy riffs. But at the same time, we're not afraid to play acoustic guitars in a circle. It's not a one-direction evolution for us." – Pepper Keenan

== Release and reception ==
Professional ratings
Review scores
Source	Rating
AllMusic	3.5/5 stars
Metal Hammer	10/10
Rolling Stone	10/4/07

The album was leaked in full on or around August 29, 2007. The album was also released on LP, and in a special edition digipak featuring a bonus track and an extended booklet. The album debuted at No. 42 in the Irish Singles Chart on September 27, 2007. The album debuted at No. 26 on the U.S. Billboard 200 chart, selling about 29,000 copies in its first week. On the UK Album Charts, the album debuted at No. 46 on September 30, 2007.

Over the Under was No. 4 in Revolver's list of the 20 best albums of 2007 and No. 2 in Metal Hammer's year-end list. It was ranked No. 37 on Rolling Stone's list of the Top 50 Albums of 2007.

Reviews for the album were mixed. Matthew Cooper at Last Rites praised the production, musicianship, and backing vocals. He commended "Nothing in Return (Walk Away)" to be a "slow, massive nine-minute closer is a supremely commanding emotional climax built on a dominant back-and-forth drum pattern, astral noodling, and impassioned vocals, in an undeniable display of the band members' combined talents." Don Kaye at Blabbermouth rated it 6.5/10 stars, and opined "the group is just not playing or writing at the top of its game here", as well as "many of the songs on 'III' are drawn-out and unmemorable, consisting mainly of one or two riffs repeated over and over while Anselmo's vocals cascade and echo on top." Vince Neilstein of MetalSucks rated it 3.5 out of 5 horns, echoing the mixed opinion, writing it "...isn't a spectacular album that is going to change the face of metal and save the day. But what it is is an awesome album to groove and smoke a bowl to while being reminded that metal doesn't always have to be all about tough guy posturing..."

== Track listing ==
No.	Title	Writer(s)	Length
1.	"Three Suns and One Star"	Phil Anselmo, Kirk Windstein	5:41
2.	"The Path"	Anselmo, Rex Brown	4:09
3.	"N.O.D."	Anselmo, Pepper Keenan, Windstein	4:00
4.	"I Scream"	Anselmo, Keenan	3:48
5.	"On March the Saints"	Anselmo, Keenan, Windstein	4:10
6.	"Never Try"	Anselmo, Brown, Keenan	4:55
7.	"Mourn"	Anselmo, Keenan	4:44
8.	"Beneath the Tides"	Anselmo, Keenan	5:32
9.	"His Majesty the Desert"	Anselmo, Keenan	2:25
10.	"Pillamyd"	Anselmo, Keenan	5:15
11.	"In the Thrall of It All"	Anselmo	6:20
12.	"Nothing in Return (Walk Away)"	Anselmo, Keenan	8:55
Total length:			59:54

Bonus track on 2007 European and Japanese releases
No.	Title	Writer(s)	Length
13.	"Invest in Fear"	Down	5:20
Total length:			65:14

=== Notes ===
- On October 14, 2008, Down re-released Over the Under in a deluxe edition, containing 30 extra minutes of bonus footage and live performances on a DVD, as an exclusive item for Best Buy stores throughout the United States.

== Personnel ==
Down

- Phil Anselmo – vocals, guitar on "The Path"
- Pepper Keenan – guitar
- Kirk Windstein – guitar
- Rex Brown – bass
- Jimmy Bower – drums

Additional musicians

- Ross Karpelman – keyboards

Technical personnel

- Warren Riker – producer, recording engineer, mixer
- David "The Puma" Troia – additional engineering, Pro Tools
- Jonas Grabarnick – Pro Tools
- Rouble Kapoor – assistant engineer
- Bo Jo – assistant engineer
- Brian "Big Bass" Gardner – mastering
- Vance Kelly – art direction and design
- Pepper Keenan – art direction and design
- Dove Shore – photography

== Charts ==
Album – Billboard (North America)

Year	Chart	Position
2007	Billboard 200	26
2007	Top Independent Albums	3

== Tour dates ==
Over the Under Tour
- Promotional tour by Down,
- Location: Europe, North America, Australasia
- Associated album: Over the Under
- Start date: September 27, 2007
- End date: October 14, 2008

Date	City	Country	Venue
North America I
September 27, 2007	Reno	United States	Stoney's
September 28, 2007	San Francisco	United States	Senator
September 29, 2007	Chico	United States	Senator
October 1, 2007	Portland	United States	Roseland Theater
October 2, 2007	Spokane	United States	Big Easy
October 4, 2007	Vancouver	Canada	Commodore Ballroom
October 5, 2007	Seattle	United States	Showbox SoDo
October 6, 2007	Boise	United States	Big Easy
October 8, 2007	Denver	United States	Ogden Theatre
October 10, 2007	Chicago	United States	House of Blues
October 11, 2007	Milwaukee	United States	The Rave
October 13, 2007	St. Louis	United States	Pop's
October 14, 2007	Tulsa	United States	Cain's Ballroom
October 16, 2007	Kansas City	United States	Beaumont Club
October 17, 2007	Minneapolis	United States	1st Ave
October 19, 2007	Detroit	United States	Harpos
October 20, 2007	Cincinnati	United States	Bogart's
October 22, 2007	Toronto	Canada	Phoenix
October 23, 2007	Cleveland	United States	House of Blues
October 25, 2007	New York City	United States	Roseland Ballroom
October 26, 2007	Atlantic City	United States	House of Blues
October 27, 2007	Worcester	United States	Palladium
October 28, 2007	Montreal	Canada	Metropolis
October 30, 2007	Albany	United States	Northern Lights
October 31, 2007	Baltimore	United States	Sonar
November 7, 2007	Atlanta	United States	Roxy Theatre
November 9, 2007	Tampa	United States	Jannus Landing
November 10, 2007	Fort Lauderdale	United States	Revolution
November 11, 2007	Orlando	United States	Hard Rock Live
November 13, 2007	Houston	United States	Meridian
November 14, 2007	San Antonio	United States	Sunset Station
November 15, 2007	Corpus Christi	United States	Concrete St
November 17, 2007	Lubbock	United States	Pavilion
November 18, 2007	Albuquerque	United States	Sunshine
November 19, 2007	Tempe	United States	Marquee Theatre
November 20, 2007	San Diego	United States	House of Blues
November 23, 2007	Los Angeles	United States	The Music Box @ Fonda
November 24, 2007	Las Vegas	United States	House of Blues
North America II
January 18, 2008	Mobile	United States	Soul Kitchen
January 19, 2008	Birmingham	United States	Workplay Theatre
January 20, 2008	Lafayette	United States	Grant St. Dance Hall
January 22, 2008	Little Rock	United States	The Village
January 23, 2008	Oklahoma City	United States	Diamond Ballroom
January 25, 2008	Springfield	United States	Reminton's
January 26, 2008	Urbana	United States	Canopy Club
January 27, 2008	Grand Rapids	United States	The Orbit Room
January 29, 2008	Flint	United States	Machine Shop
January 30, 2008	Pittsburgh	United States	Rex Theater
February 2, 2008	Indianapolis	United States	Egyptian Room
February 4, 2008	Buffalo	United States	Town Ballroom
February 5, 2008	Allentown	United States	Crocodile Rock
February 7, 2008	Long Island	United States	Mulcahy's
February 8, 2008	Providence	United States	Lupo's
February 9, 2008	Sayreville	United States	Starland Ballroom
February 11, 2008	Poughkeepsie	United States	The Chance
February 12, 2008	New Haven	United States	Toad's Place
February 13, 2008	Richmond	United States	Toad's Place
February 14, 2008	Norfolk	United States	Norva Theatre
February 16, 2008	Knoxville	United States	Valarium
February 18, 2008	Ashville	United States	Orange Peel
February 19, 2008	Nashville	United States	The Cannery
February 21, 2008	New Orleans	United States	Southport Music Hall
Europe I
March 18, 2008	Moscow	Russia	B1
March 19, 2008	St. Petersburg	Russia	Port Club
March 21, 2008	Tampere	Finland	Pakkhuone
March 22, 2008	Helsinki	Finland	Kulttuuritalo
March 24, 2008	Stockholm	Sweden	Debaser
March 25, 2008	Oslo	Norway	Rockefeller
March 26, 2008	Copenhagen	Denmark	Pumpehuset
March 28, 2008	Prague	Czech Republic	Rock Café
March 29, 2008	Warsaw	Poland	Stodola
March 30, 2008	Berlin	Germany	Huxley's
April 1, 2008	Munich	Germany	Elserhalle
April 2, 2008	Stuttgart	Germany	Longhorn
April 3, 2008	Brussels	Belgium	AB
April 5, 2008	Amsterdam	Netherlands	Melkweg
April 6, 2008	Paris	France	Bataclan
April 8, 2008	Glasgow	Scotland	Academy
April 9, 2008	Birmingham	England	Academy
April 10, 2008	Norwich	England	University of East Anglia
April 12, 2008	Manchester	England	Academy
April 13, 2008	London	England	Brixton Academy
April 15, 2008	Dublin	Ireland	Ambassador
April 17, 2008	Tilburg	Netherlands	Roadburn Festival's "Pre-Heat"
April 18, 2008	Wiesbaden	Germany	Schlachtof
April 19, 2008	Caluire et Cuire	France	Le Radiant
April 21, 2008	Zürich	Switzerland	Rohstofflager
April 22, 2008	Milan	Italy	Alcatrazz
April 24, 2008	Barcelona	Spain	Alcatrazz
April 25, 2008	Madrid	Spain	Joy Eslava
April 27, 2008	Lisbon	Portugal	Coliseu dos Recreios
Europe II
July 10, 2008	Hamburg	Germany	Markthalle
July 12, 2008	Köln	Germany	Live Music Hall
July 13, 2008	Malmö	Sweden	Kulturbolaget
July 14, 2008	Gothenburg	Sweden	Trädgårn
Supporting Metallica with The Sword
July 16, 2008	Bergen	Norway	Bergenhus Castle
July 18, 2008	St. Petersburg	Russia	SKK Hall
July 20, 2008	Riga	Latvia	Skonto Stadium
July 22, 2008	Bologna	Italy	Parco Nord
July 25, 2008	Sofia	Bulgaria	Levski Stadium
July 27, 2008	Istanbul	Turkey	Ali Sami Yen Stadium
Oceania
October 10, 2008	Brisbane	Australia	The Arena
October 11, 2008	Sydney	Australia	UNSW Roundhouse
October 12, 2008	Melbourne	Australia	Palace Theatre
October 14, 2008	Perth	Australia	Metro Fremantle
