= Pat Bruders =

American bassist

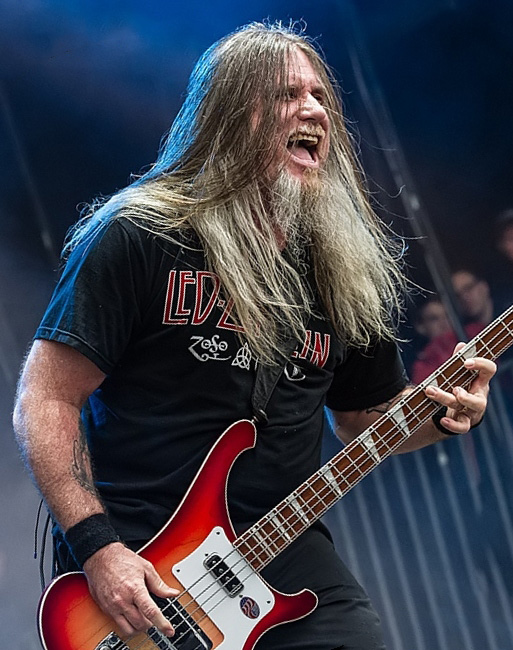
- Bruders in 2013

Background information
- Born: Patrick Bruders; El Paso, Texas, U.S.
- Origin: New Orleans, Louisiana, U.S.
- Genres: Sludge metal; doom metal; blackened death metal; black metal; heavy metal; crust punk; country
- Occupation: Musician
- Instrument: Bass guitar
- Member of: Down; Outlaw Order; Saint Vitus; Gasmiasma; Pure Luck
- Formerly of: Crowbar; Goatwhore

Patrick Bruders is an American musician who is the bassist for heavy metal supergroup Down, former bassist of extreme metal band Goatwhore from 1997 to 2004, and bassist for sludge metal band Crowbar from 2005 until 2013, and since 2025.

In 2008, Bruders joined Eyehategod's side project Outlaw Order and began live bass duties for the band, but has since parted ways with the group. He began touring as live bassist with Down in early 2011, replacing former bassist Rex Brown, before being added as a permanent member, performing live and in studio. Bruders is also a member of the New Orleans–based crust punk band Gasmiasma, Austin-based country band Pure Luck, and joined the doom metal band Saint Vitus in 2016.

In 2025 Bruders returned to Crowbar as a substitute for regular bassist Shane Wesley, who was touring with Acid Bath.

== Discography ==
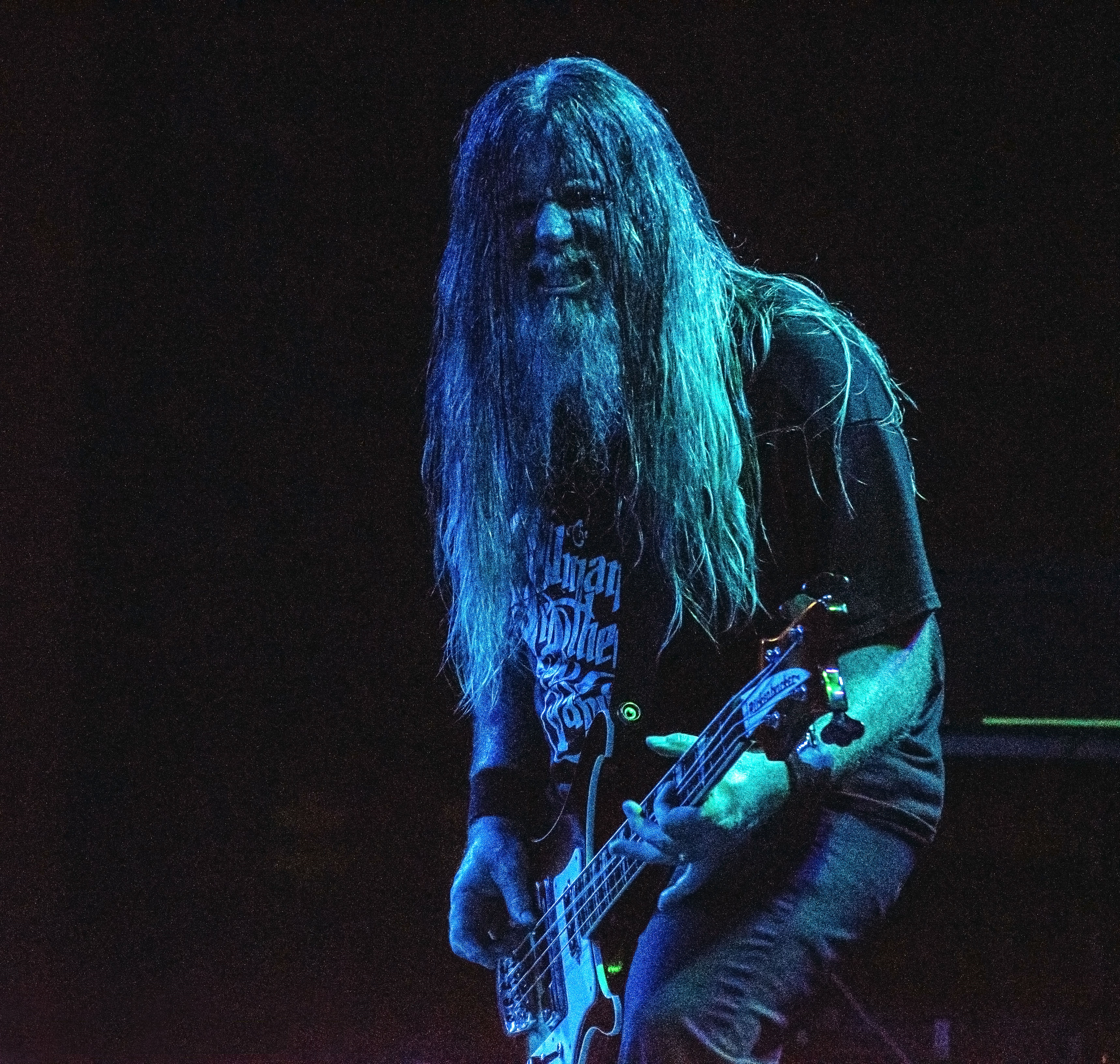
Bruders performing with Down in 2015

=== Goatwhore ===
Date of release	Title
2000	The Eclipse of Ages into Black
2003	Funeral Dirge for the Rotting Sun

=== Crowbar ===
Date of release	Title
2011	Sever the Wicked Hand

=== Down ===
Date of release	Title
2012	Down IV – Part I
2014	Down IV – Part II
2026	Volume V

=== Gasmiasma ===
Date of release	Title
2011	Trenchrats EP
2012	Crashermangle
2013	Krvs Kadavers (live cassette)
2014	Thermobarbarian Glioblastoma

== Personal life ==
Bruders is married to Stephanie Bruders (née Lecompte).
