= Walk Through Exits Only =

Studio album by Philip H. Anselmo & the Illegals
- Released: July 16, 2013
- Recorded: 2011
- Studio: Nodferatu's Lair, Louisiana
- Genre: Groove metal; sludge metal; hardcore punk
- Length: 40:44
- Label: Housecore
- Producer: Michael Thompson, Phil Anselmo

Philip H. Anselmo & the Illegals chronology
Walk Through Exits Only (2013)	Choosing Mental Illness as a Virtue (2018)

Professional ratings
Aggregate scores
Source	Rating
Metacritic	70/100
Review scores
Source	Rating
AllMusic	3.5/5 stars
Blabbermouth.net	8.5/10
Consequence of Sound	2.5/5 stars
CraveOnline	6.5/10
Exclaim!	8/10
PopMatters	5/10
Spin	8/10

Walk Through Exits Only is the debut solo album by Pantera frontman Phil Anselmo and his backing band the Illegals. It was released on July 16, 2013, under Anselmo's own label, Housecore Records. This album has been compared to Pantera's 1996 album The Great Southern Trendkill due to Anselmo's extreme vocal style and very heavy guitar riffs.

== Track list ==
No.	Title	Length
1.	"Music Media Is My Whore"	1:54
2.	"Battalion of Zero"	4:20
3.	"Betrayed"	5:28
4.	"Usurper Bastard's Rant"	3:57
5.	"Walk Through Exits Only"	5:34
6.	"Bedroom Destroyer"	5:03
7.	"Bedridden"	2:25
8.	"Irrelevant Walls and Computer Screens"	12:01
Total length:		40:44

== Personnel ==
=== Philip H. Anselmo & the Illegals ===
- Phil Anselmo − vocals
- Marzi Montazeri − guitars
- Bennett Bartley − bass guitar
- Jose Manuel Gonzalez − drums
