= Phil Anselmo =

American heavy metal vocalist (born 1968)

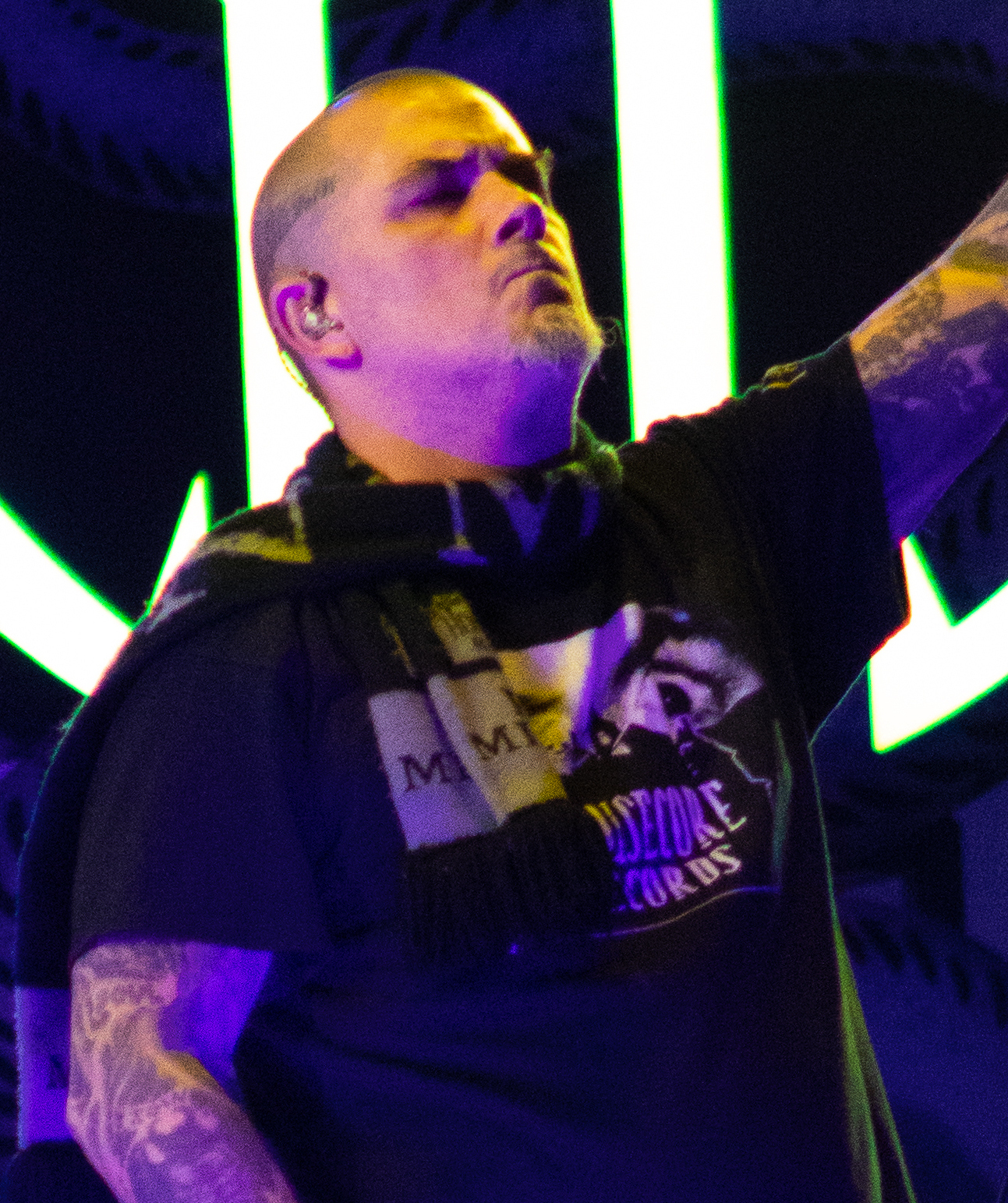
- Anselmo with Pantera in 2022

Background information
- Born: Philip Hansen Anselmo; June 30, 1968 (age 58); New Orleans, Louisiana, U.S.
- Genres: Heavy metal; extreme metal; groove metal
- Occupations: Singer; songwriter; musician; record producer
- Works: Full discography
- Years active: 1981–present
- Label: Housecore
- Member of: Pantera; Down; En Minor; Philip H. Anselmo and the Illegals; Scour
- Formerly of: Superjoint; Arson Anthem; Viking Crown; Necrophagia; Eibon; Christ Inversion; Razor White
- Website: housecorerecords.com

Philip Hansen Anselmo (born June 30, 1968) is an American musician best known as the lead singer for groove metal band Pantera, southern metal/sludge metal supergroup Down, and hardcore/sludge metal band Superjoint, amongst other musical projects. He is the owner of Housecore Records.

Anselmo is regarded as one of the most iconic frontmen in metal history, known for being particularly animated and donning a machismo attitude that became emblematic of the general theme of Pantera. Earlier in his career with the band, Anselmo took considerable inspiration from traditional heavy metal vocalists such as Rob Halford, singing in full head voice. However, he later became recognized for a more abrasive style of vocals, and formed a number of extreme metal projects such as Scour.

== Early life ==
Anselmo was born in New Orleans, Louisiana, and is mainly of Italian and French heritage. He also has Danish heritage through his maternal great-grandmother. He attended many schools across Louisiana and Texas, the last of which was Grace King High School in the New Orleans suburb of Metairie, which he dropped out of during 12th grade. Anselmo's father, Phil, owned and operated a restaurant in Metairie called Anselmo's, which closed following Hurricane Katrina. Anselmo has said in various interviews that he was the class clown as a child. As a teenager, Anselmo accidentally started a fire in his parents' house while attempting to prank his sister. The incident resulted in smoke damage to most of the furniture and part of the house needing renovation. Anselmo worked on a shrimp boat with his stepfather in his teenage years.

== Career ==
In 1981, Anselmo co-formed his first band, Samhain (not to be confused with Glenn Danzig's band of the same name), together with friends from around the area, performing vocal and guitar duties. In 1985, he joined the band Vapid Phaze who would later rename themselves to Razor White, after one of the songs Anselmo wrote. While they did have some original material, they mainly played cover songs of popular rock and metal bands. Around this time, Anselmo quit high school to concentrate on his musical career. After about a year-plus with the band, he became frustrated with Razor White's direction and began to explore other options. "They wanted to go off on this Dokken trip and I was goin', 'No, I can't go through that,' so I split. They're super cool dudes, they're just lost musically," Anselmo said in 1991.

=== Pantera ===
By 1986, Pantera had released three albums via Metal Magic Records, but did not garner much attention, because the band was not signed with a major record label at the time. Seeking a new frontman to continue down a heavier path, the band's original singer Terry Glaze, who was primarily a glam metal vocalist, left the band. In 1986, after several meetings, then-18-year old Anselmo was officially added to the Pantera lineup. Anselmo relocated to Texas to record Pantera's fourth album, Power Metal, which was released in 1988.

Following the release of Power Metal, the band dropped its glam image and adopted a more casual look. In 1989, after being rejected "28 times by every major label on the face of the Earth", Pantera signed to Atco Records, and released their fifth album, Cowboys from Hell, in the following year, which paved the way towards the band's stardom and defined a new style of metal known as groove metal. As a tour unfolded to promote the band's latest album, there was documented portions of this tour on their first home video, Cowboys from Hell: The Videos, released in 1991.

In February 1992, Pantera released their sixth studio album, Vulgar Display of Power, which featured an even heavier sound than its predecessor. The album eventually reached number 40 on the US Billboard 200 chart and sold more than two million copies worldwide. They later released Far Beyond Driven in March 1994, which debuted at number one in the US.

In late June, Anselmo was charged with assault following an altercation with a security guard when fans were prevented from getting on stage. He was released on $5,000 bail the next day. The trial was delayed three times. In May 1995, he apologized in court, plead guilty to attempted assault, and was ordered to undergo 100 hours of community service.

In 1996, Pantera released their eighth studio album, The Great Southern Trendkill. Due to growing tensions between Anselmo and the rest of the band, he recorded the vocal tracks for this album in New Orleans, while the other members recorded in Texas. The latter peaked at number four on the Billboard 200 chart. They followed up with their first and only official live album titled Official Live: 101 Proof, featuring two new studio tracks.

In March 2000, Pantera released their ninth and final studio album, Reinventing the Steel, where it also peaked at number four. After touring to promote the album, Anselmo wanted to take a year break off from the group, followed by the September 11 attacks that abruptly cut their upcoming tour with Slayer, which led to their hiatus.

In 2003, Pantera released their first compilation album, The Best of Pantera: Far Beyond the Great Southern Cowboys' Vulgar Hits! (alternatively titled Reinventing Hell: The Best of Pantera in Europe). The album featured songs from five studio albums with Anselmo, and also included three cover tracks. A bonus DVD was also made, containing all of the band's music videos. Later that year, Pantera disbanded over communication problems and accusations that Anselmo had neglected the band.

In July 2022, it was announced that Anselmo would be joining bassist Rex Brown, along with Zakk Wylde and Charlie Benante (as the respective fill-ins for Dimebag Darrell and Vinnie Paul), for Pantera's first world tour in 22 years in 2023.

==== Post-Pantera ====
Following the disbandment, Anselmo devoted much of his time to a longtime side project, Superjoint Ritual. Having heard of this, the Abbott brothers of Pantera (guitarist Dimebag Darrell and drummer Vinnie Paul) went on to form Damageplan with guitarist Pat Lachman on vocals and Bob Zilla on bass.

After Vinnie Paul slammed Superjoint Ritual, saying Anselmo could not even keep his eyes open, Anselmo responded and replied, "I just hear a big and sad yellowbelly crybaby fuckin' knowing that his meal ticket is in a different fuckin' band ... You would have to know those guys to really understand where I was coming from. They're scared of their own fuckin' shadows. And, all that said, I wish them the best of fuckin' luck. I still love 'em." Anselmo had engaged in a war of words with Dimebag Darrell since the disbandment of Pantera, culminating in the statement "Dimebag deserves to be beaten severely" in the December 2004 edition of the UK's Metal Hammer magazine. Initially, he denied making the statement, but later changed his story in a VH1 Behind the Music special on Pantera, claiming that the comment had been lighthearted and made off the record. However, Vinnie Paul told the press that he had heard the audio files of the interview and that Anselmo had not been misquoted.

On December 8, 2004, Dimebag Darrell was shot and killed while performing with Damageplan at the Alrosa Villa nightclub in Columbus, Ohio. At the request of Darrell's family, Anselmo did not attend his funeral.

In a lengthy and emotional video posted on Down's official website, Anselmo described his regret over his previous behavior, and has written and recorded music dealing with the loss of Darrell on the Down record Over the Under. The band dedicated their song "Lifer" to Darrell. Anselmo stated that he wished to restart his friendship with Vinnie Paul, but a reconciliation had not occurred when Paul died on June 22, 2018.

In a July 2015 interview with Rolling Stone, Anselmo spoke out against Pantera and his other band's usage of the Confederate flag, saying that it was a mistake to use it on their merchandise, albums, and other promotional material. Anselmo said "These days, I wouldn't want anything to fucking do with it because truthfully ... I wouldn't. The way I feel and the group of people I've had to work with my whole life, you see a Confederate flag out there that says 'Heritage, not hate.' I'm not so sure I'm buying into that." Anselmo said originally, that Pantera used the image because they were huge fans of Lynyrd Skynyrd, but it was never about promoting hate.

=== Down ===
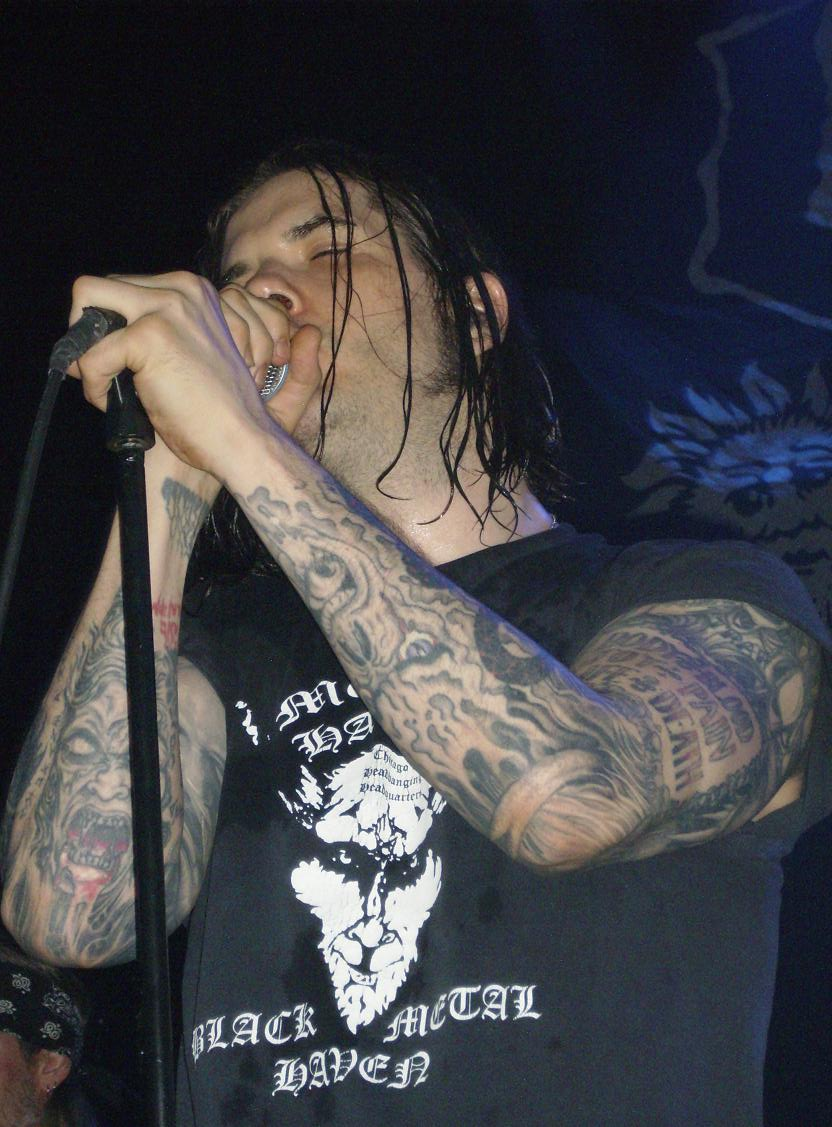
Anselmo performing with Down in 2008

Down is a heavy metal supergroup formed in 1991 in New Orleans, Louisiana. The band consists of Phil Anselmo (Pantera), Jimmy Bower of Eyehategod, Pepper Keenan of Corrosion of Conformity, Kirk Windstein and Pat Bruders of Crowbar. Other former members include Rex Brown also of Pantera, Todd Strange of Sun Don't Shine and Bobby Landgraf

Since their formation, Down has gone on hiatus twice and has released five studio albums. The first three were LPs entitled NOLA (1995), Down II: A Bustle in Your Hedgerow (2002), and Over the Under (2007). In 2008, the band began working on additional material, which resulted in two EPs entitled Down IV – Part I, released in September 2012, and Down IV – Part II, released in May 2014. On August 19, 2026, they announced that their next album, titled Volume V, would be released on November 20.

=== Superjoint Ritual ===
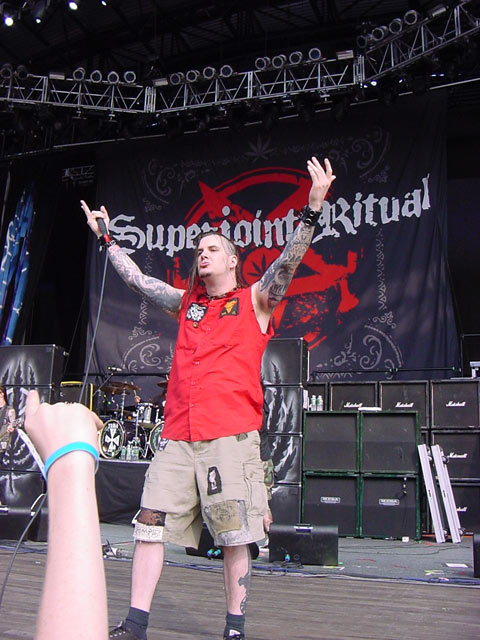
Anselmo with Superjoint Ritual at Ozzfest 2004

Superjoint Ritual is a New Orleans metal band formed by Anselmo, Joe Fazzio, and Jimmy Bower in the early 1990s, later to be joined by Hank Williams III and Kevin Bond. Their style can be considered a mix of sludge metal and hardcore punk. According to Bower, Anselmo wrote 70–80% of the group's music. During their time together they have released three full-length albums via Sanctuary Records, Use Once and Destroy in 2002, A Lethal Dose of American Hatred in 2003, and Caught Up in the Gears of Application in 2016.

=== Side projects ===
==== Arson Anthem ====
Arson Anthem is a Southern hardcore punk project that originated when Eyehategod singer Mike Williams moved into Anselmo's spare apartment after losing all his possessions in the aftermath of Hurricane Katrina. The two spent countless hours listening to Anselmo's collection of early hardcore bands. They began jamming with Hank Williams III and Collin Yeo, who were united by their desire to have a hardcore/crust punk band of their own. The Arson Anthem lineup features Mike Williams on vocals, Anselmo on guitar, Hank Williams III on drums, and Collin Yeo on bass.

==== Christ Inversion ====
Christ Inversion was formed in 1994. The group was a short-lived black metal/sludge metal project formed by Anselmo, where he played guitar under the alias "Anton Crowley", it also featured Wayne Fabra on vocals, best known for being part of Necrophagia and for playing drums in Graveyard Rodeo. Most of their lyrics were based on horror films and Diabolism. The band recorded two demos in 1994 and 1995 respectively, and then disbanded without ever recording a full-length album. Many years later, songs from the first demo were put on an eight-track compilation and released through Anselmo's own Housecore Records on October 28, 2008. The second demo was also planned to see a re-release, however this never surfaced.

==== Southern Isolation ====
The band on October 30, 2001 released one EP called Southern Isolation. It originally contained four songs but was later re-released in 2002 with a fifth bonus track. The band consisted of Anselmo's then-girlfriend Stephanie Opal Weinstein on vocals, Anselmo on vocals, backing vocals and guitars, "Big" Ross Karpelman (of Clearlight) on keyboards, and Sid Montz (of Crowbar) on drums.

One rare track called "Faded" has been credited to Southern Isolation on the Manson Family soundtrack.

==== Viking Crown ====
In the mid-1990s, Anselmo began to record for several side projects under the alias "Anton Crowley", most notably with Viking Crown. The name Anton Crowley is taken from Aleister Crowley (British occultist) and Anton LaVey (founder and high priest of the Church of Satan). Viking Crown was a short-lived and essentially solo side project by Anselmo. The members of the band were Anselmo (as Anton Crowley) on guitars, bass and drums; Killjoy on vocals; and Opal Enthroned (Stephanie Opal Weinstein) on keyboards. On their first album Unorthodox Steps of Ritual, Anselmo played every instrument and laid down his own vocals. The band never performed live.

==== Eibon ====
Eibon was a short-lived supergroup, which Anselmo participated in from 1998 to 2000. The group featured Killjoy, Fenriz, Satyr, and Maniac. The project has been put on indefinite hiatus, and to date, it has only released a single track, Mirror Soul Jesus, which appeared on the Moonfog 2000: A Different Perspective compilation in 2000. The band was on Satyr's record label Moonfog Productions.

==== Philip H. Anselmo & the Illegals ====
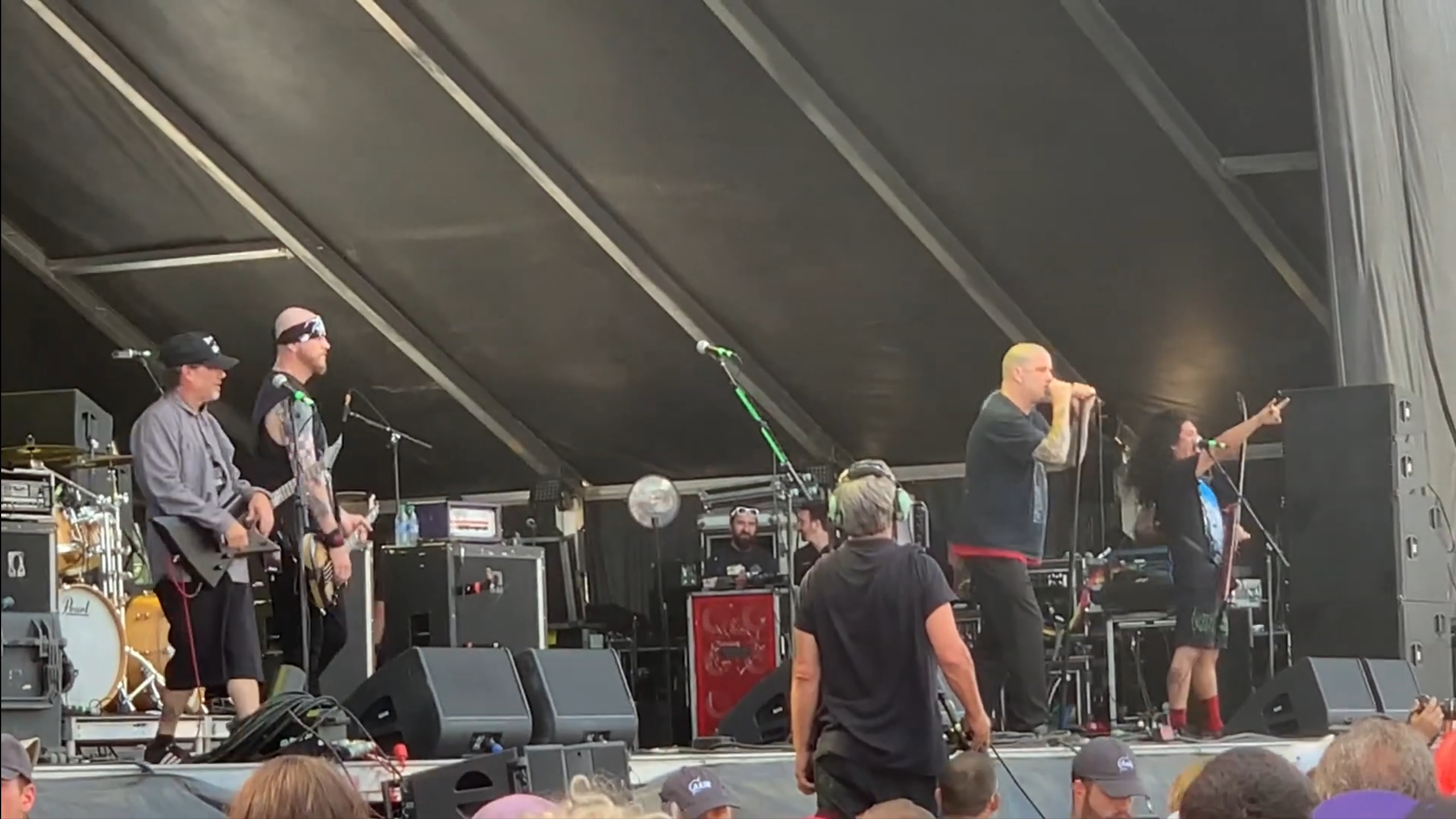
Anselmo performing with the Illegals in 2019

During 2011–2012, Anselmo wrote and recorded a solo album, Walk Through Exits Only, with his backing band the Illegals. It was released on July 16, 2013. In October 2017, the second album, Choosing Mental Illness as a Virtue, was announced, originally due in December but postponed to January 26, 2018. The first song off the second album, "Choosing Mental Illness", was made available for streaming. The next song, "The Ignorant Point", was released on December 13, 2017. Exclaim! gave the album a rating of 8 out of 10.

The band consists of Anselmo on vocals, Stephen Taylor on rhythm guitar, Joey Gonzalez on drums, Mike DeLeon on lead guitar and Derek Engemann on bass.

==== Scour ====
It was announced in May 2016 that Anselmo would be fronting a new band, Scour, with members from Pig Destroyer (John Jarvis), Cattle Decapitation (Derek Engemann), Animosity (Chase Fraser), and Strong Intention (Jesse Schobel). The band is stylistically black metal, with the exception of Anselmo's use of lower growling instead of the higher, raspier vocals commonly associated with the genre. James Christopher Monger of AllMusic described the band's sound as a "punishing mix of black metal, grindcore, and thrash".

The band's self-titled debut EP was released in July 2016 via Anselmo's label Housecore Records, featuring six songs all under three minutes in length. Scour's second EP, Red, was released in September 2017. The title track and the song "Piles" were made available for streaming ahead of the release of the EP. Scour released their third EP, titled Black, on November 27, 2020.

Scour's debut album, Gold, was released on February 21, 2025.

==== En Minor ====
In a September 27, 2017 interview with Jimmy Cabbs' 5150 interview series, Anselmo announced a new project called En Minor, which he said is influenced by the artists of the classic 1980s gothic rock period. The band released a single on August 2, 2019, containing the tracks "On the Floor" and "There's a Long Way to Go".

The first full-length album, When the Cold Truth Has Worn Its Miserable Welcome Out, was released via Anselmo's own record label Housecore in the US and via Season of Mist in Europe in September 2020.

=== Other appearances and releases ===
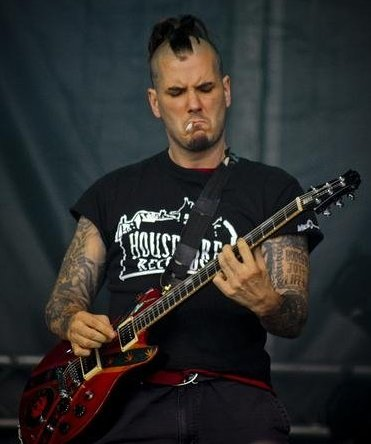
Anselmo playing guitar for Eyehategod during Hellfest 2009

In 1993, Anselmo produced Crowbar's self titled album and recorded backing vocals on some of the tracks.

In 1996, Anselmo recorded guitars on two songs ("Van Full of Retards" and a cover of Manowar's "Gloves of Metal") and contributed vocals/backing vocals on 18 songs for Anal Cunt's 40 More Reasons to Hate Us album.

In 1996, Anselmo recorded backing vocals for tracks on Crowbar's Broken Glass album.

Anselmo can be heard in the 1997 Jim Van Bebber film The Manson Family as the voice of Satan. The film soundtrack also contains music from several of Anselmo's bands.

In 1998, Anselmo provided vocals on Soilent Green's album Sewn Mouth Secrets. Although not credited, he is given thanks in the liner notes.

In 1997, Necrophagia frontman Killjoy reformed his band with Anselmo on guitars. Using the Anton Crowley aliases, Anselmo appeared on the 1998 Holocausto de la Morte album, the 1999 Black Blood Vomitorium EP, and finally the 2001 Cannibal Holocaust EP, which featured Opal Enthroned (then Anselmo's wife) on keyboards. Anselmo left the band in 2001.

In 1998, Anthrax released the album Volume 8: The Threat Is Real. Anselmo provided backing vocals on track 8 ("Killing Box"). Also, his Pantera bandmate Dimebag Darrell played guitar solos on tracks 3 ("Inside Out") and 7 ("Born Again Idiot").

In 1998, Anselmo sang a duet ("By the River") on Vision of Disorder's Imprint album.

In 2000, Tony Iommi released a collaborative album with various well known vocalists. Initially, Anselmo was going to co-create an entire album with Iommi, but due to tour schedules it never happened. Anselmo managed, however, to lay down some tracks for Iommi's album. Iommi and Anselmo wrote and recorded three tracks together, "Time Is Mine", "Inversion of the Saviours", and a third unknown track. Iommi picked "Time Is Mine" for the album. "Inversion of the Saviours" was never officially released, but can be found online. The third unknown track is now highly sought after by fans of both artists.

In 2001, Anselmo provided additional vocals for "HFFK" on Biohazard's Uncivilization album.

On March 6, 2006, Anselmo made an appearance along with Guns N' Roses and Velvet Revolver bassist Duff McKagan and the surviving members of Alice in Chains at a VH1's Decades Rock Live concert, in honor of the band Heart.

In 2008, Anselmo recorded vocals for the Mahakali album by Jarboe. The track is sparse musically, features a raw vocal delivery by Anselmo, and a short spoken-word segment.

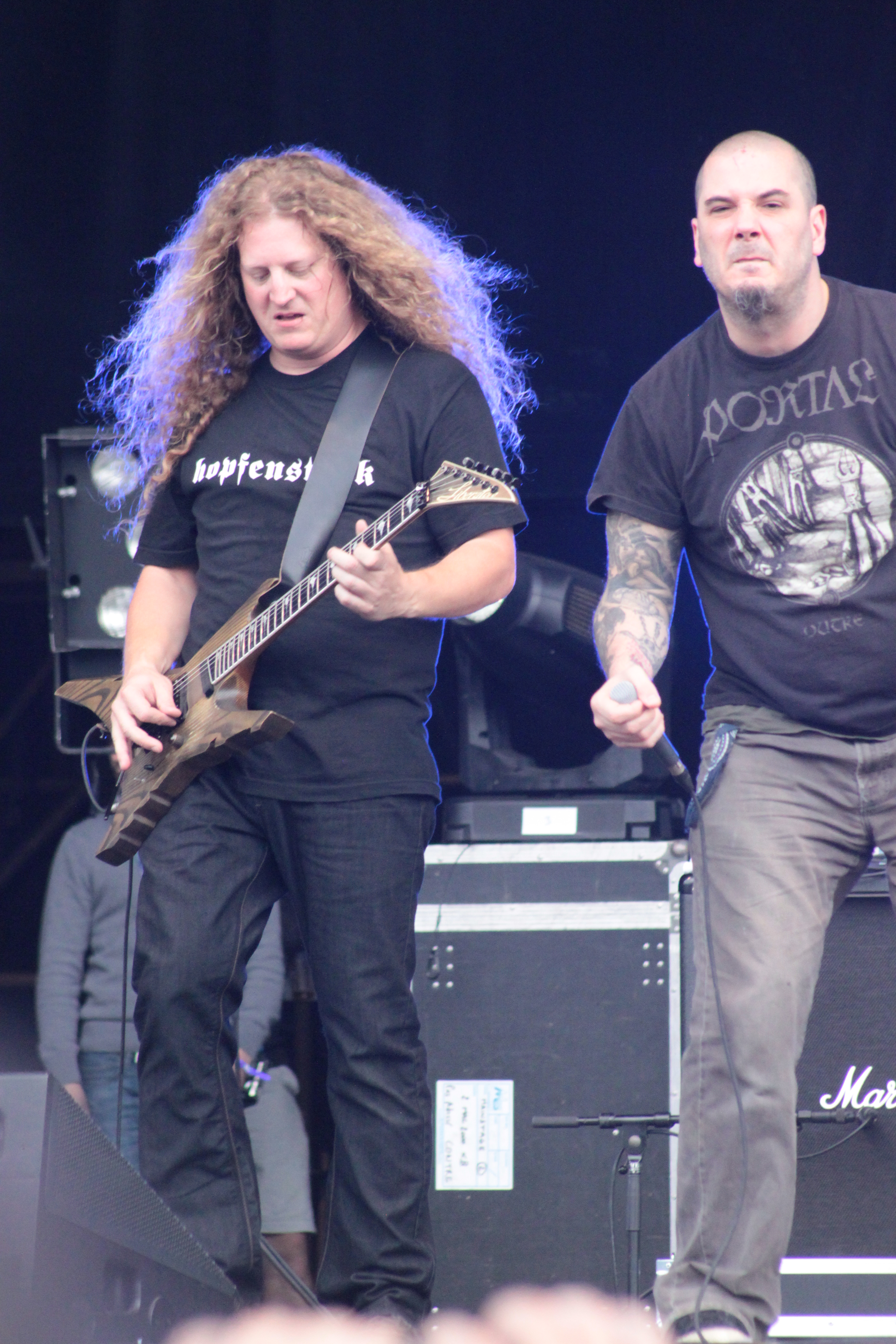
Anselmo (right) performs with Voivod in 2013

In 2014, Anselmo appeared in the YouTube comedy series Metal Grasshopper with comedian Dave Hill, in which he instructs Hill on how to "be metal".

In 2015, Anselmo contributed backing vocals to "The Prophets of Loss", a song from the Cattle Decapitation album The Anthropocene Extinction, released in August 2015.

In January 2016, Anselmo sang lead vocals in a band which included Foo Fighters lead singer Dave Grohl, Metallica bassist Robert Trujillo, and former Slayer drummer Dave Lombardo. They performed the song "Ace of Spades" by recently deceased Lemmy Kilmister, who played for Hawkwind and Motörhead.

In 2017, Anselmo released a six-song EP titled Songs of Darkness and Despair together with Bill Moseley (under the name Bill + Phil). Anselmo and Moseley both provide vocals on the release. The songs were improvised in three days after Moseley brought his lyrics.

=== Housecore Records ===
Anselmo started his own record label called Housecore Records sometime in 2001. After gaining permission from Pantera's label, Elektra, he merged Housecore with his longtime friend and Necrophagia bandmate Killjoy's label, Baphomet Records. The newly named "Baphomet/Housecore Records" secured distribution deals with Relapse Records in August 2001. Anselmo stated "What you're going to get here with Baphomet/Housecore, it's going to be different. It's going to be a fresh approach. It's going to be a lot of home made shit, not all major label-produced monstrosities. I just got permission from Elektra to independently put out all the bands that I've ever fucking done. Each band that I'm involved in outside of Pantera is a way for me to express and develop different outlets that are very much a part of me. With Pantera it's only one side of me. I love to write and create music, and the side bands are very different from Pantera. They also show the flexibility in me as a musician; Pantera's very important in my life, but there's many other things that keep this boy here content". After only three releases, Anselmo and Killjoy severed business ties, thus returning Anselmo's label to its original name, Housecore Records. Housecore is now actively releasing material by Anselmo and by bands he is producing and supporting.

== Influences ==
Anselmo has a wide range of musical influences from classic rock to black metal. He was mainly influenced by bands such as Black Sabbath, Judas Priest, Iron Maiden, Slayer, Black Flag, Agnostic Front, Hellhammer and Venom, and singers Rob Halford, David Lee Roth, Dee Snider, Ronnie James Dio, Ozzy Osbourne, Roger Miret and Henry Rollins. He pays tribute to two of his favorite bands in the lyrics of the Pantera song "Goddamn Electric" from the album Reinventing the Steel, singing "your trust is in whiskey and weed and Black Sabbath"; in the second verse, the lyric is tweaked to "whiskey and weed and Slayer". Anselmo stated that his main vocal influence had been Judas Priest singer Rob Halford before he decided to focus on the exploration of his own technique.

Anselmo mentioned that he is a massive fan of hardcore punk, especially 1980s hardcore.

In 2016, Anselmo said the favorite of recent concerts he had attended included Morrissey, Nick Cave and the Bad Seeds, and Stevie Wonder. Wonder performed the entirety of his classic 1976 album Songs in the Key of Life, which Anselmo described as "like watching a living, breathing miracle right before your eyes."

== Personal life ==
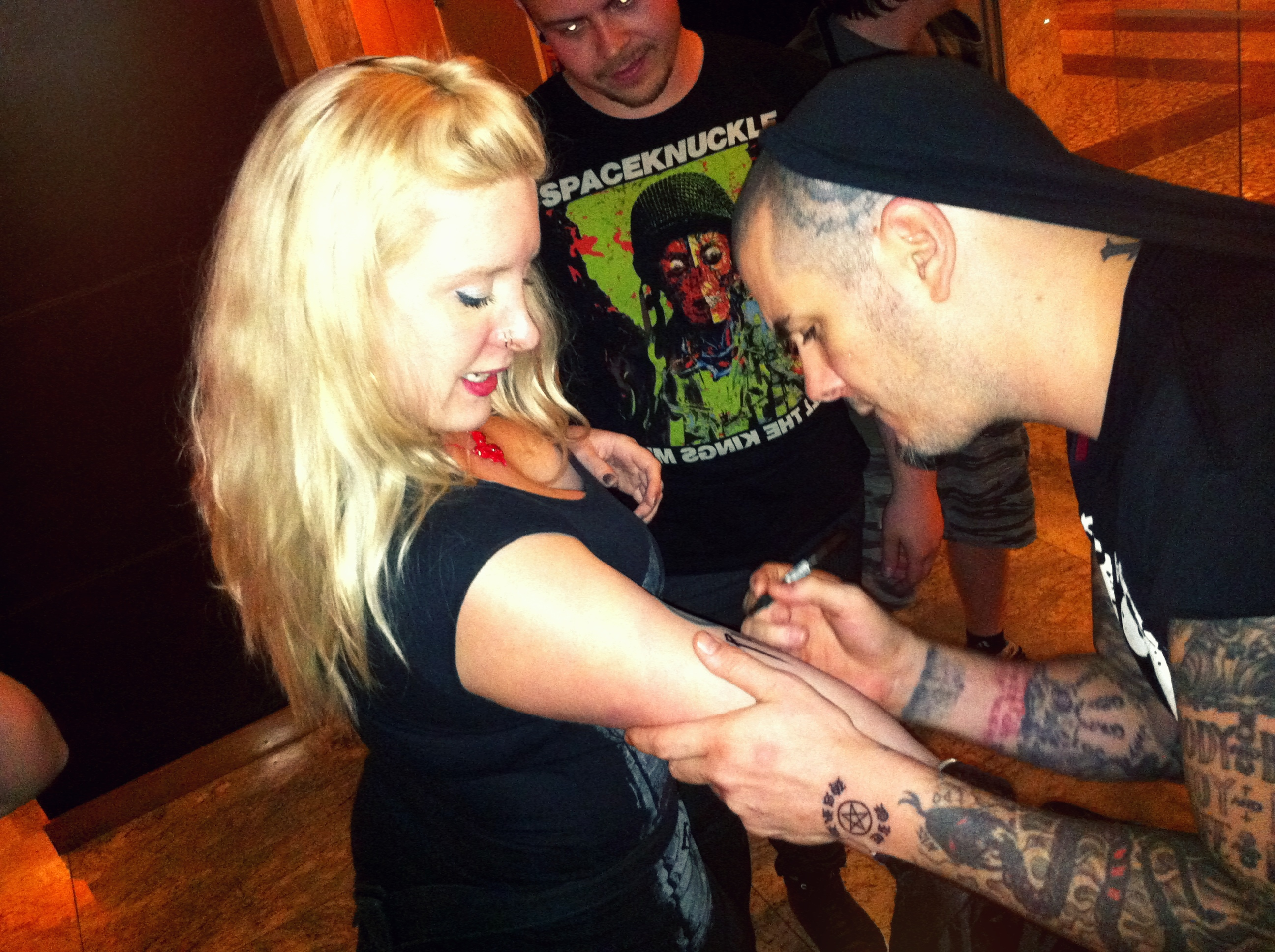
Anselmo signing an autograph for a fan

On October 31, 2001, Anselmo married his longtime girlfriend, Stephanie Opal Weinstein. That same year, the couple created an all-acoustic duo called Southern Isolation and released an eponymous four-song EP.

As of 2011, Anselmo lives in rural Louisiana, and is in a relationship with Kate Richardson, who also helps run his record label, Housecore Records. He is an atheist.

=== Interests ===
Anselmo owns a collection of several thousand horror films and possesses an encyclopedic knowledge of horror films and horror culture. Together with Steve Joseph, Ross Karpelman, and Jay Gracianette, Anselmo started a Halloween-themed attraction called House of Shock. Initially it began in Jay Gracianette's backyard, but was later moved to a large warehouse outside New Orleans that has been converted into an interactive haunted house with over three hundred volunteer workers. The attraction has raised money for the Children's Hospital of New Orleans, the Parish Police Bullet Proof Vest Fund, and the Greater New Orleans Riding Rehabilitation Center. Anselmo played the role of a part-time actor when his schedule permitted, however Anselmo is no longer involved with House of Shock.

Anselmo has an interest in the sport of boxing. He owns hundreds of fight DVDs and used to take a boxing trainer on tour with him. He has written articles as a columnist for the Boxing Insider website. Also a fan of the NFL team New Orleans Saints, Anselmo has interviewed Saints player Jeremy Shockey and has helped to coach a youth team at the request of Saints team ambassador Michael Lewis during a visit to the team's practice facility. inadvertedly soiled

=== Health ===
Anselmo recounted to Loudwire in 2017 that he experienced fecal incontinence while uttering the first high note of a 1986 Pantera performance, which he attributed to illness. He left the stage during the guitar solo and borrowed a pair of pants from another person to finish the set because he had been wearing a white spandex. He stated that he woke up the following morning to discover that he had contracted pediculosis pubis. Loudwire produced an animated visual aid for this incident.

According to Anselmo, he suffered constant pain due to a back injury he sustained in the mid-1990s. To alleviate the pain, he drank heavily, abused prescription drugs such as painkillers and muscle relaxants, and eventually became addicted to heroin. Throughout the late 1990s and early 2000s his drug abuse severely affected his onstage performance.

On July 13, 1996, Anselmo went into cardiac arrest due to a heroin overdose after a show at the Coca-Cola Starplex Amphitheatre in Dallas, Texas. Paramedics revived him, and four days later, he issued a press release stating, "I, Philip H. Anselmo [...] injected a lethal dose of heroin into my arm, and died for four to five minutes".

In 2005, Anselmo stopped using hard drugs, so that he could be cleared for surgery to repair back damage caused by degenerative disc disease, and has remained clean ever since. The surgery was successful, and after several months of recuperation and rehabilitation, he returned to recording and touring.

In November 2016, Anselmo reported that he had stopped drinking alcohol. Though he is "pretty much an atheist", he nonetheless gave up alcohol during Lent earlier that year and "kind of lost the taste for it".

=== Views on race ===
Anselmo has given some controversial statements about race, skin color, and culture throughout his life. At a Pantera concert in Montreal in 1995, he gave a speech expressing that "Pantera are not a racist band" and that he and his bandmates had friends "of all colors and all kinds", but that he had a problem with rap artists "pissing all over white culture". In another concert, he expressed his disgust with affirmative action, saying "fuck all that Black Power bullshit".

Winda Benedetti of the Seattle Post-Intelligencer accused Anselmo of mouthing the words "white power" and making Nazi salutes at Superjoint Ritual's performance at Ozzfest on July 27, 2004. Speaking with Kerrang!, Benedetti alleged that she was seated in the second row, and saw Anselmo lean down and mouth the words towards a crowd of skinheads at the front. Kerrang! was unable to reach Anselmo for comment.

==== 2016 Dimebash incident ====
On January 22, 2016, an intoxicated Anselmo ended the "Dimebash" Dimebag Darrell tribute show by giving a Nazi salute and screaming the words "white power" to the crowd. The incident was captured by an audience member's cell phone camera and the video was posted on YouTube. Anselmo later claimed that it was an in-jest reference to drinking white wine. This was disputed by Machine Head frontman Robb Flynn, who claimed in a YouTube video that Anselmo had been drinking Beck's at the time.

Despite initially refusing to apologize, he later retracted this statement and said it "was ugly, it was uncalled for and anybody who knows me and my true nature knows that I don't believe in any of that. I'm a thousand percent apologetic to anyone who took offense to what I said, cause you should've taken offense to what I said."

In an interview with Eddie Trunk on SiriusXM on December 15, 2016, Anselmo claimed he was being taunted throughout the show by "two or three little hecklers" who were standing near the stage. He stated that the hecklers called him all sorts of names throughout the show, and by the end he had lost his patience. Of the show Anselmo said, "When people start screaming 'racist' over and over and over and over again at me, what I did was show them exactly what [...] the ugliest possible thing I could think of at the time was." He also noted that when Scott Ian asked him to donate to Simon Wiesenthal Center, a Jewish human rights organization, he did so immediately.

In January 2023, the reformed Pantera was dropped from the German Rock am Ring and Rock im Park festivals due to Anselmo's past behavior. Pantera's concert in Austria scheduled for May 31, 2023, was also canceled following an outcry over his previous remarks. Despite these incidents, Pantera are slated to play three shows in Germany in 2025 on their UK/EU 2025 tour.

== Discography ==
Pantera

- Power Metal (1988)
- Cowboys from Hell (1990)
- Vulgar Display of Power (1992)
- Far Beyond Driven (1994)
- The Great Southern Trendkill (1996)
- Reinventing the Steel (2000)

Down

- NOLA (1995)
- Down II: A Bustle in Your Hedgerow (2002)
- Down III: Over the Under (2007)
- Volume V (2026)

Superjoint Ritual

- Use Once and Destroy (2002)
- A Lethal Dose of American Hatred (2003)
- Caught Up in the Gears of Application (2016)

Southern Isolation

- Southern Isolation (1995)

Viking Crown

- Innocence from Hell (2000)
- Banished Rhythmic Hate (2001)

Arson Anthem

- Insecurity Notoriety (2010)

Philip H. Anselmo & The Illegals

- Walk Through Exits Only (2013)
- Choosing Mental Illness as a Virtue (2018)

En Minor

- When the Cold Truth Has Worn Its Miserable Welcome Out (2020)

Scour

- Gold (2025)

== Awards and nominations ==
Year	Award	Category	Work	Result
2010	Maverick Movie Awards	Best Performance (short)	Not As I Pictured	Nominated
2012	Loudwire Music Awards	Rock Titan of the Year	Himself	Nominated
2015	Loudwire Music Awards	Rock Titan of the Year	Himself	Won
2015	President’s Arts Awards	Musical Artists of the Year	Himself	Won
