= NOLA (album) =

Studio album by Down
- Released: September 19, 1995
- Recorded: August 29, 1994 – January 22, 1995
- Studio: Ultrasonic (New Orleans)
- Genres: Sludge metal; stoner metal; Southern metal
- Length: 56:33
- Label: EastWest
- Producers: Down; Matt Thomas

Down chronology
NOLA (1995)	Down II: A Bustle in Your Hedgerow (2002)

Singles from NOLA
- 1. "Lifer" Released: August 1995; 2. "Stone the Crow" Released: September 1995; 3. "Rehab" Released: 1995

NOLA is the debut studio album by American heavy metal band Down, released on September 19, 1995, by EastWest Records. The title is the abbreviation for New Orleans (NO), Louisiana (LA).

== Production ==
=== Writing and recording ===
NOLA was written mainly by Phil Anselmo and Pepper Keenan between 1990 and 1995. Throughout 1991 to 1993, the band released three demos: a three-track demo (1991), a four-track demo (1992), and a ten-track demo (1993). Originally, the band made the three-track demo for underground trading. The demo featured the tracks "Losing All", "Temptation's Wings", and "Bury Me in Smoke". In an effort to build a fan base, the band would ask heavy metal fans if they had ever "heard of this band, Down" and hand them copies of the tape without telling the person that they were in the band. In 1992, the band recorded a second demo, this time featuring the same track listing as the original but with an intro. In 1993, the band made the Demo Collection 1992–1993 which is a ten-track demo featuring all the songs that would make the album cut except "Rehab", "Pray for the Locust", and "Underneath Everything". Anselmo solely wrote only three songs on the album ("Hail the Leaf", "Pray for the Locust", and "Pillars of Eternity"). Eventually, the original demo tape was distributed throughout the United States and Down played a small concert in its home town. A record executive from EastWest Records was attending the show. When he found out who the members of the band were, he signed Down to a recording contract. The band began recording the album in the summer of 1994 at the Ultrasonic Studios, New Orleans, Louisiana, and completed the recording sessions by January 1995.

=== Influences ===
The band cites as influences 70s heavy rock bands such as Black Sabbath and Led Zeppelin, southern rock bands such as Lynyrd Skynyrd (in the song "Stone the Crow") and ZZ Top (in the rhythmic style of "Rehab") and doom metal bands such as Witchfinder General, Pentagram, Trouble, Saint Vitus (especially album V) and The Obsessed.

=== Artwork ===
The booklet art is by Jim DeBarros and David Manteau and makes extensive use of vintage photographs by Clarence John Laughlin.

== Release and reception ==
=== Commercial performance ===
NOLA was released in September 1995 and would peak at number 57 in October 1995 on the Billboard 200, and remain on the chart for six weeks. The album spawned three singles in "Lifer", "Stone the Crow" and "Rehab", which were released in 1995. However, only "Stone the Crow" would achieve commercial success when it reached number 40 on the Mainstream Rock Tracks charts, becoming Down's first and only top 40 song.

=== Critical reception ===
Professional ratings
Review scores
Source	Rating
AllMusic	4.5/5 stars
Chicago Tribune	3.5/4 stars
Collector's Guide to Heavy Metal	9/10
Kerrang!	4/5 stars
Laut.de	5/5 stars
Metal Hammer	4/5 stars
MusicHound Rock	2.5/5 stars
Rock Hard	9.5/10

The album received acclaim from critics. AllMusic reviewer David Reamer praised the songs "Temptation's Wings", "Stone the Crow", and "Bury Me in Smoke", stating that "this is a landmark album that combines the talents of dedicated rock musicians, and should be included in any collection of heavy metal music." In 2006, Oliver Badin of Terrorizer wrote that Down "succeeded where most supergroups fail: truly being the perfect sum of [its members] parts. But what makes [NOLA] so great is its forcible seizure of the Sabbathian legacy and how it soaked it in the filthy swamps of New Orleans."

Rock Hard ranked the album at number 244 on their list of the "500 Greatest Rock & Metal Albums of All Time".

== Track listing ==
All tracks are written by Phil Anselmo and Pepper Keenan, unless noted.

No.	Title	Writer(s)	Length
1.	"Temptation's Wings"		4:24
2.	"Lifer"		4:36
3.	"Pillars of Eternity"	Anselmo	3:57
4.	"Rehab"	Anselmo, Keenan, Kirk Windstein	4:03
5.	"Hail the Leaf"	Anselmo	3:28
6.	"Underneath Everything"		4:46
7.	"Eyes of the South"		5:13
8.	"Jail"	Anselmo, Keenan, Windstein, Todd Strange	5:17
9.	"Losing All"		4:21
10.	"Stone the Crow"		4:42
11.	"Pray for the Locust" (instrumental)	Anselmo	1:07
12.	"Swan Song"	Anselmo, Jimmy Bower, Keenan	3:35
13.	"Bury Me in Smoke"		7:04
Total length:			56:33

== Personnel ==
Down

- Philip Anselmo – vocals, mandolin (track 8), guitar (track 11)
- Pepper Keenan – guitars
- Kirk Windstein – guitars, bass (Note: Although Strange is credited as bass in all of the credits on each release, Windstein reportedly played the instrument in the studio. Strange still contributed to the songwriting of "Jail", and also played live.)
- Jimmy Bower – drums
- Todd Strange – bass

Additional musicians

- Lil' Daddy – percussion (track 8), water pipe (track 5)
- Sid Montz – percussion (track 8)
- Ross Karpelman – keyboards (track 8)

Technical personnel

- Matt Thomas – production, mixing
- David Farrell – mixing
- Ted Jensen – mastering
- Clarence John Laughlin – photography
- Michael Miller – photography
- Atom Bomb – photography

== Chart positions ==
Album – Billboard (United States)

Year	Chart	Position
1995	Billboard 200	57

Singles – Billboard (United States)

Year	Single	Chart	Position
1995	"Stone the Crow"	Mainstream Rock Tracks	40

== Tour ==
Down supported NOLA with a 13-date concert tour. The band went on hiatus in 1996 as all members continued their main projects. They would reunite in 1999 to make a second album, Down II, released in 2002.

=== Tour dates ===
Date	City	Country	Venue
An Evening with Down
September 20, 1995	New Orleans, Louisiana	United States	Rendon Inn
September 21, 1995	Dallas, Texas	United States	Deep Ellum
September 24, 1995	Chicago, Illinois	United States	The Vic Theatre
September 25, 1995	Detroit, Michigan	United States	Saint Andrew's Hall
September 26, 1995	Cleveland, Ohio	United States	The Odeon
September 27, 1995	New York City, New York	United States	The Academy
September 29, 1995	San Francisco, California	United States	Fillmore West
Headlining with Far
September 30, 1995	Los Angeles, California	United States	The Palace
An Evening with Down
December 27, 1995	San Antonio, Texas	United States	Sneakers
December 28, 1995	Houston, Texas	United States	The Millenium
December 30, 1995	Shreveport, Louisiana	United States	The Warehouse
