= Down (band) =

American heavy metal band

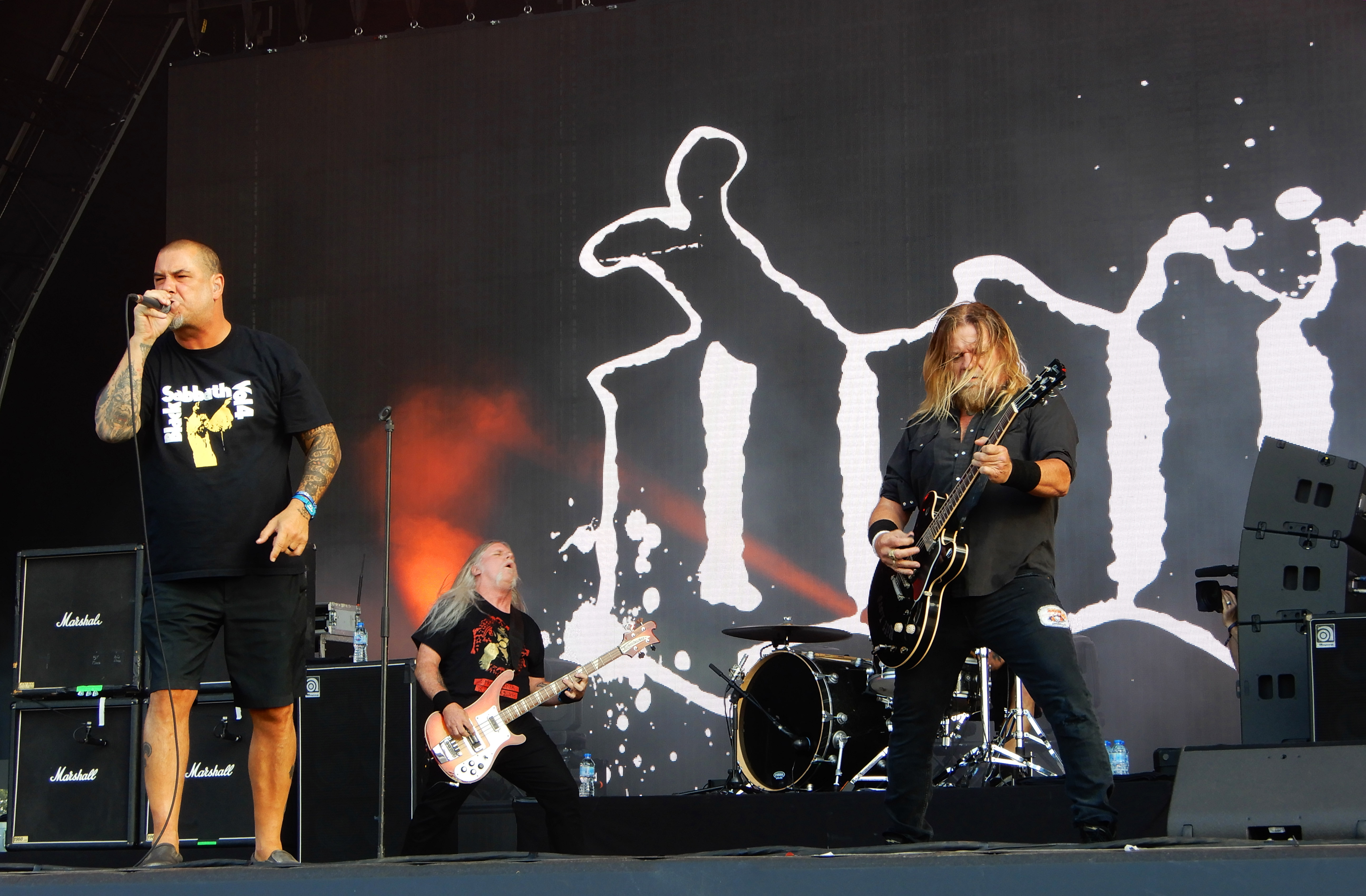
- Down at Hellfest 2022. L–R: Phil Anselmo, Pat Bruders, Pepper Keenan

Background information
- Origin: New Orleans, Louisiana, U.S.
- Genres: Sludge metal; Southern metal; stoner metal
- Years active: 1991–present
- Labels: Elektra; East West; ILG; Roadrunner; Nuclear Blast
- Members: Phil Anselmo; Pepper Keenan; Kirk Windstein; Pat Bruders; Jimmy Bower
- Past members: Bobby Landgraf; Rex Brown; Todd Strange
- Website: down-nola.com

Down is an American heavy metal supergroup that formed in New Orleans, Louisiana, in 1991. The current lineup consists of vocalist Phil Anselmo (Pantera, Superjoint Ritual), drummer Jimmy Bower (Eyehategod, Crowbar, Superjoint Ritual), guitarists Pepper Keenan (Corrosion of Conformity) and Kirk Windstein (Crowbar, Sun Don't Shine), and bassist Pat Bruders (Goatwhore, Crowbar, Saint Vitus).

Since their formation, Down has gone on hiatus twice and has released four full-length studio albums. The first three were LPs entitled NOLA (1995), Down II: A Bustle in Your Hedgerow (2002), and Over the Under (2007). In 2008, the band began working on additional material, which resulted in two EPs entitled Down IV – Part I, released in September 2012, and Down IV – Part II, released in May 2014. Their first full-length studio album in 19 years, Volume V, was released on November 20, 2026.

== History ==
=== Formation and NOLA (1991–1998) ===
NOLA has always reminded me sound-wise and approach-wise as a really loud demo, and it was based on three three-song demos that we did just for fun. We were still growing and finding out what we were as a band, and we were into a lot of bands that were influenced by Black Sabbath, like St. Vitus, Trouble and Witchfinder General.

— Phil Anselmo on Down's first album

Down formed in 1991 with vocalist Phil Anselmo of Pantera, drummer Jimmy Bower of Eyehategod, guitarists Pepper Keenan of Corrosion of Conformity and Kirk Windstein of Crowbar and bassist Todd Strange, also of Crowbar. All of the band members were longtime friends, and shared interest in bands such as Black Sabbath, Trouble, and Saint Vitus, which would significantly influence the music they made. The band made a three-track demo for underground trading. In an effort to build a fan base, Anselmo and Keenan would ask heavy metal fans if they had ever "heard of this band, Down" and hand them copies of the tape without telling the person that they were in the band. Eventually, the tape was distributed throughout the United States and Down played a small concert in its hometown. A record executive from Elektra Records was attending the show. When he found out who the members of the band were, he signed Down to a recording contract.

Down released its debut album, NOLA, on September 19, 1995, debuting at number 55 on the Billboard 200. AllMusic reviewer David Reamer gave the album a nearly perfect 4.5 out of 5 stars, praising the songs "Temptations Wings", "Stone the Crow", and "Bury Me in Smoke". Reamer stated that "this is a landmark album that combines the talents of dedicated rock musicians, and should be included in any collection of heavy metal music." NOLA was supported by a 13-date tour, and afterward the band went on hiatus in order to return to their respective bands.

=== Down II: A Bustle in Your Hedgerow... and Over the Under (1999–2008) ===
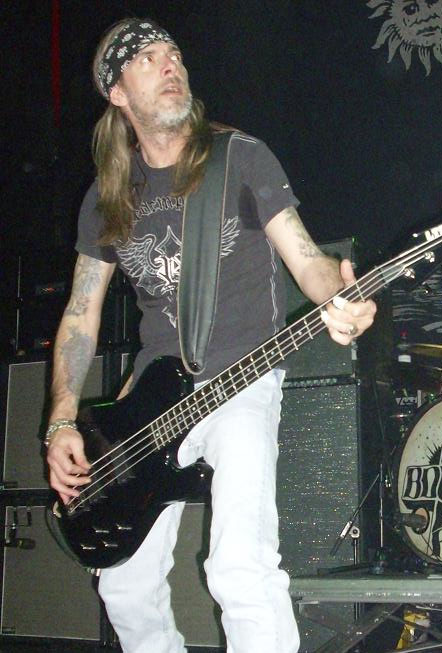
Rex Brown joined the band in 1999.

In 1999, while Down was on hiatus, Strange left the band and was replaced by Pantera bassist Rex Brown. In late November 2001, Down came back from hiatus to make another record. The band wrote and recorded Down II: A Bustle in Your Hedgerow in 28 "drug and booze induced" days in Phil Anselmo's barn called "Nödferatu's Lair." The album was released on March 26, 2002, but was not received with the same positive reviews as NOLA. Blabbermouth.net reviewer Borivoj Krgin stated, "Down II appears to have been thrown together more haphazardly, with much of the material falling short of the standard set by the Down's classic debut offering." Despite mixed reviews, the album debuted at number 44 on the Billboard 200. To support the album, Down toured on the second stage of Ozzfest in 2002. Also in 2002, the band recorded an acoustic version of "Stone the Crow" that was never officially released although it can be heard on YouTube. Afterward, the band once again entered an indefinite hiatus to focus on their respective bands.

Newly signed to Warner Bros. Records, Down once again reformed in 2006. The band wrote an album over the course of a year. The lyrical content of Over the Under covers subjects such as the breakup of Pantera, the murder of ex-Pantera guitarist Dimebag Darrell, the band's anger at the aftermath of Hurricane Katrina, and Anselmo's recovery from back surgery and drug addiction. Debuting at number 26 on the Billboard 200, the album was released on September 25, 2007, and received generally positive reviews. Kirk Miller of Decibel Magazine said of the album, "for almost an hour, it's like the metal world was set right again."

The release of Over the Under was preceded by a tour with Heaven & Hell and Megadeth. To further support their album, Down headlined a tour starting at the end of September 2007.

On April 22, 2008, the BBC Radio 1 program Rock Show broadcast a Down session that included four recordings: "N.O.D." (with alternate lyrics), "Beneath the Tides", "Jail", and a cover of Led Zeppelin's "When the Levee Breaks".

On October 21, 2008, Down began their North American tour as a supporting act -alongside The Sword- for Metallica at the Jobing Arena in Glendale, Arizona.

=== Diary of a Mad Band (2008–2010) ===
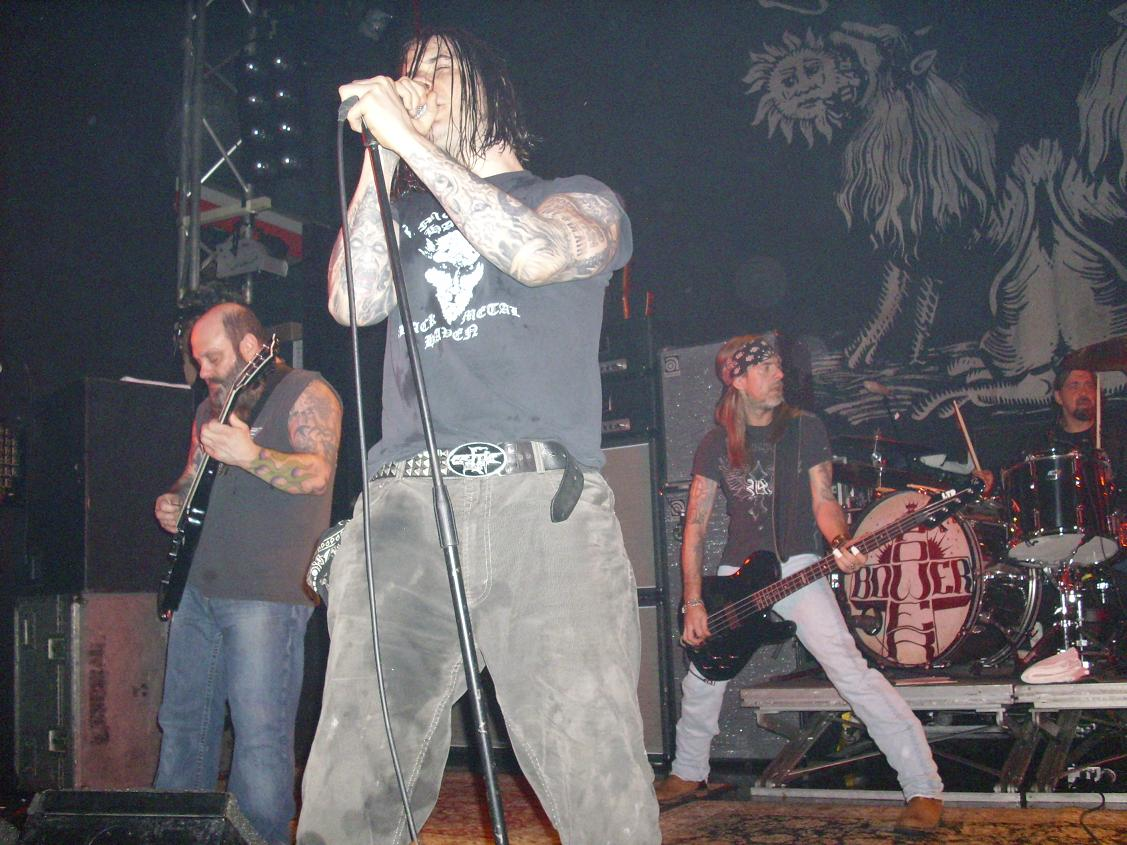
Down live in Madrid, 2008. L–R: Kirk Windstein, Phil Anselmo, Rex Brown, Jimmy Bower

On July 24, 2008, frontman Phil Anselmo mentioned in a post on the band's Myspace blog that Down had been "fucking around with some new material" and had "enough material already recorded"—at least six new songs in addition to those that did not make the final cut on Over the Under. What or how much will be included on the tentative Down IV is uncertain, but according to Anselmo, there is "definitely enough for an awesome EP, with some surprises within."

Asked in November 2008 what the current status of the new album was, bassist Rex Brown told Billboard.com that Down had been "writing constantly on the road. We still have all these ideas, and we play a lot of new stuff at sound check, just to feel it out. Hopefully, we can get back in the studio in the fall and work on something."

On February 18, 2009, Down was announced in the lineup for the 2009 Roskilde Festival in Denmark. Following these live dates, the band toured the United States and Canada during August and September 2009. On March 30, 2009, Down posted a statement on their message board indicating that they will be back in the studio from October through November writing and recording what will eventually become Down IV. In the summer of 2009, Down began a US tour without Rex on bass, who had developed acute pancreatitis.

On January 27, 2010, it was announced that Brown had nearly fully recuperated from his fight with pancreatitis. Down had discussed reconvening in New Orleans sometime after the 2010 Super Bowl to begin work on a new album. With a release date yet to be announced, the new album will be the band's fourth studio offering. After legal issues with Warner Brothers Records regarding the rights to the music, Down released the live album Diary of a Mad Band: Europe in the Year of VI on October 5, 2010, via Roadrunner Records. The title is a reference to Diary of a Madman, an Ozzy Osbourne album.

=== Brown's and Windstein's departures and EPs (2011–2016) ===
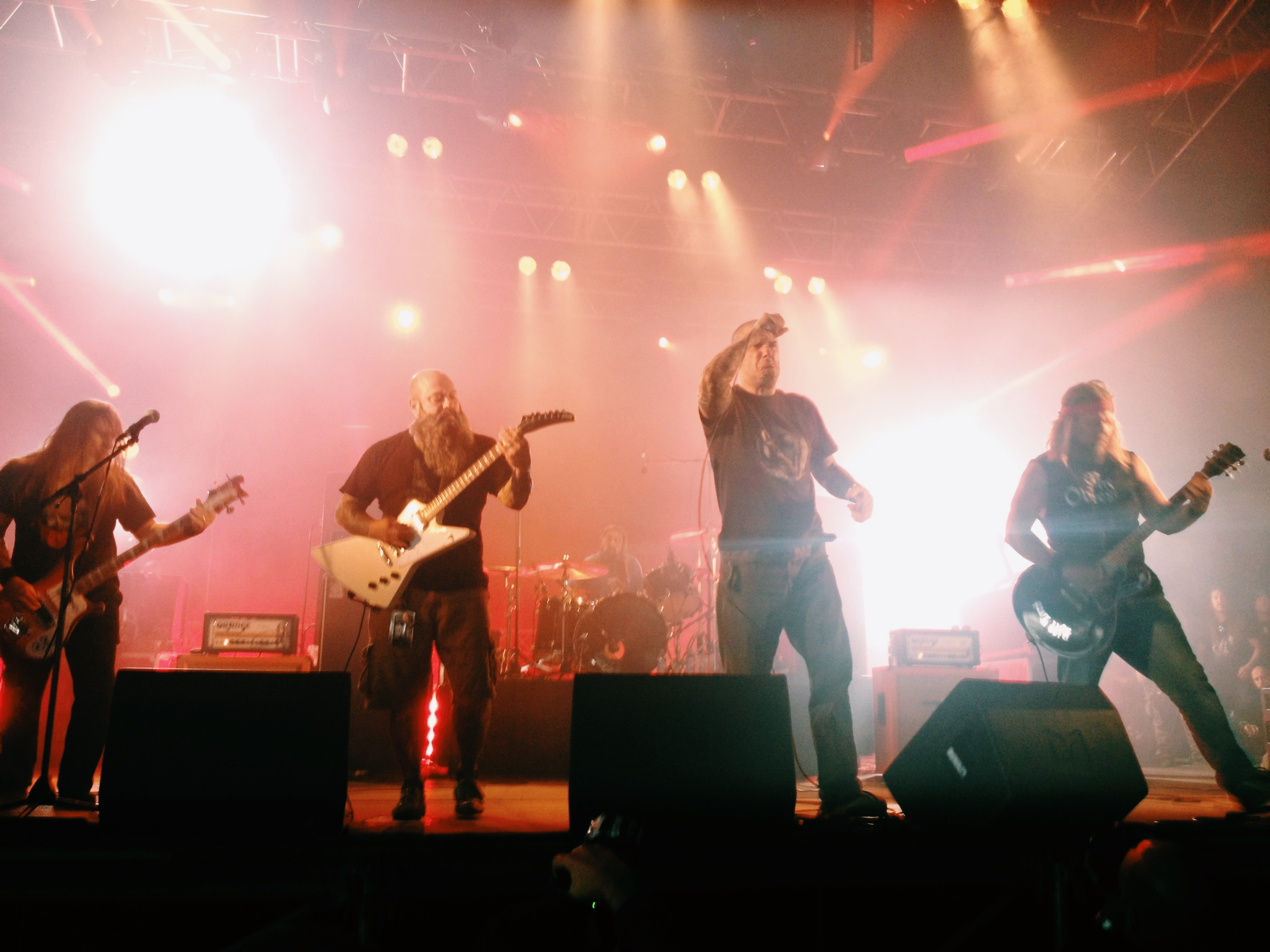
Down performing at Hellfest 2013. L–R: Pat Bruders, Kirk Windstein, Phil Anselmo, Pepper Keenan

In 2011, Phil Anselmo commented on the future of Down, stating: "Man, there will be a time for Down. Matter of fact we had a meeting this past week, and I know Jimmy's gotta go do an Eyehategod tour in February. But after that, I think we're looking to do some shows starting in March. Maybe local around here, maybe even some Mardi Gras gigs. But yeah, last week we sat around and they played me some new stuff they're working on, and it sounds good. Sounds like it's got a lot of promise, and really they just need me in the fuckin' practice room. So all this is going to happen this year. It has to happen. I know there's a responsibility here. Down has a fanbase and they are very very very loyal. So I don't want to let those people down. They deserve some new music, we have it. We've demoed other songs, there's songs that haven't even been released that people have never heard, so there's always Down there. For all you people out there, don't you stress. We got the Down coming."

On May 11, 2011, Down announced on their Facebook page that they "demoed a brand new tune." Down played at Download Festival on Saturday June 11, 2011. They played alongside System of a Down, Avenged Sevenfold and Alice Cooper. Rex did not tour with Down during their spring 2011 shows. Crowbar bassist Pat Bruders filled in for Rex during those shows. "Rex is not gonna be with us," said Keenan. "He's got things he needs to deal with, and we gave him an ultimatum and he's trying to work things out. We've got Pat (Bruders) from Crowbar playing bass, and he's ass-kickin' in the same way. He plays with his fingers—which is really cool; he's got the whole Geezer Butler thing going on." When asked whether or not Brown was still considered a part of the band, Keenan was hopeful but hesitant: "I don't know what to really say on that; he's not out of the band, but he's not playing with us live." On June 22, 2011, Jimmy Bower announced that Rex Brown would not be returning to Down, and that Pat Bruders is his replacement.

The band spoke on their Facebook page and said they started recording new material on October 20. On January 16, 2012, they revealed track names for the new EP on Facebook. Initially, rumors spread about the possibility of Down releasing four EPs, instead of an album. However, when asked about it in an interview with Scuzz TV, Anselmo said that "It would be too pretentious, we try not to think as far ahead as that, and just go with what we feel at the time. Down IV - Part I was released on September 18, 2012. A music video was made for the single "Witchtripper". In the summer of 2013, Kirk Windstein quit the band and was replaced by Bobby Landgraf. Down IV – Part II was released on May 13, 2014. A music video was made for the single "We Knew Him Well...". A video for the song "Conjure" was released on February 4, 2015.

Following Anselmo's white power and Nazi salute controversy during the Dimebash event in the United States, the organizers of FortaRock Festival decided to cancel the appearance of the band for the 2016 event.

When speaking to Max Morin of Bucketlist Music Reviews in January 2018, Anselmo said about the follow-up album to 2007's Over the Under:

"I have to focus on this new stuff for the time being because really, to clear it up and make it loud and clear for everyone: Down, when Down got together, we knew we were a band made up of many other bands. It's always been out of brotherhood and love that when any of our 'real' bands such as C.O.C. and Eyehategod, specifically get on a roll, at the time, even Pantera, [...] we always make room for that band. A tour like for Superjoint, for what it's worth, when Superjoint is working, there's no real time for Down, of course. It's a complete and just, I think, clear, very crystal-clear understanding between all of us that the day will come when things will slow down and we'll feel primed enough and ready for it and moods will alter as they do over time, especially musically. If you play certain songs, no matter what band you're in, if you play those songs enough times and enough nights, in a row, night after night, you're going to want to change tastes here and there. Yes, we will record another Down record. Everybody's committed to it. It's just right now, everybody's committed to it."

=== Reunion and Volume V (2020-present) ===
In November 2019, Down announced they would be reuniting for a series of shows in 2020, including Graspop Metal Meeting, set to take place June 18–21, 2020 in Dessel, Belgium. In anticipation of the 25th anniversary of Down's first album NOLA, founding member Kirk Windstein confirmed he was returning to the band.

However, the COVID-19 pandemic thwarted their tour plans, so the band celebrated the anniversary in August with a special livestreamed event titled "The Quarter Century Throwdown". In early 2021, Jimmy Bower revealed that the band was preparing to record an EP of covers; however, this idea was scrapped in favor of composing new material.

In an interview published August 4th, 2025, Windstein confirmed that the band was past the halfway point of recording the new album, stating the drums, bass and rhythm guitar parts had all been completed.

On February 13, 2026, Down released a cover of Dr. John's "Right Place, Wrong Time" at Mardi Gras celebration.

On August 19, 2026, they announced that their next album, titled Volume V, would be released on November 20. The first single was "Blood Oath", followed by "The Myth". Throughout August and September Down toured North America with support from Helmet and Spirt in the Room.

== Band members ==
Current members

- Phil Anselmo – lead vocals (1991–present)
- Pepper Keenan – guitar, backing vocals (1991–present)
- Jimmy Bower – drums (1991–present)
- Kirk Windstein – guitar, backing vocals (1991–2013, 2019–present)
- Pat Bruders – bass (2011–present)

Former members

- Todd Strange – bass (1991–1999)
- Rex Brown – bass (1999–2011)
- Bobby Landgraf – guitar, backing vocals (2013–2019; one-off live performance 2024)

Former touring musicians

- Danny Theriot – bass (2009; substitute for Rex Brown)

=== Gallery ===
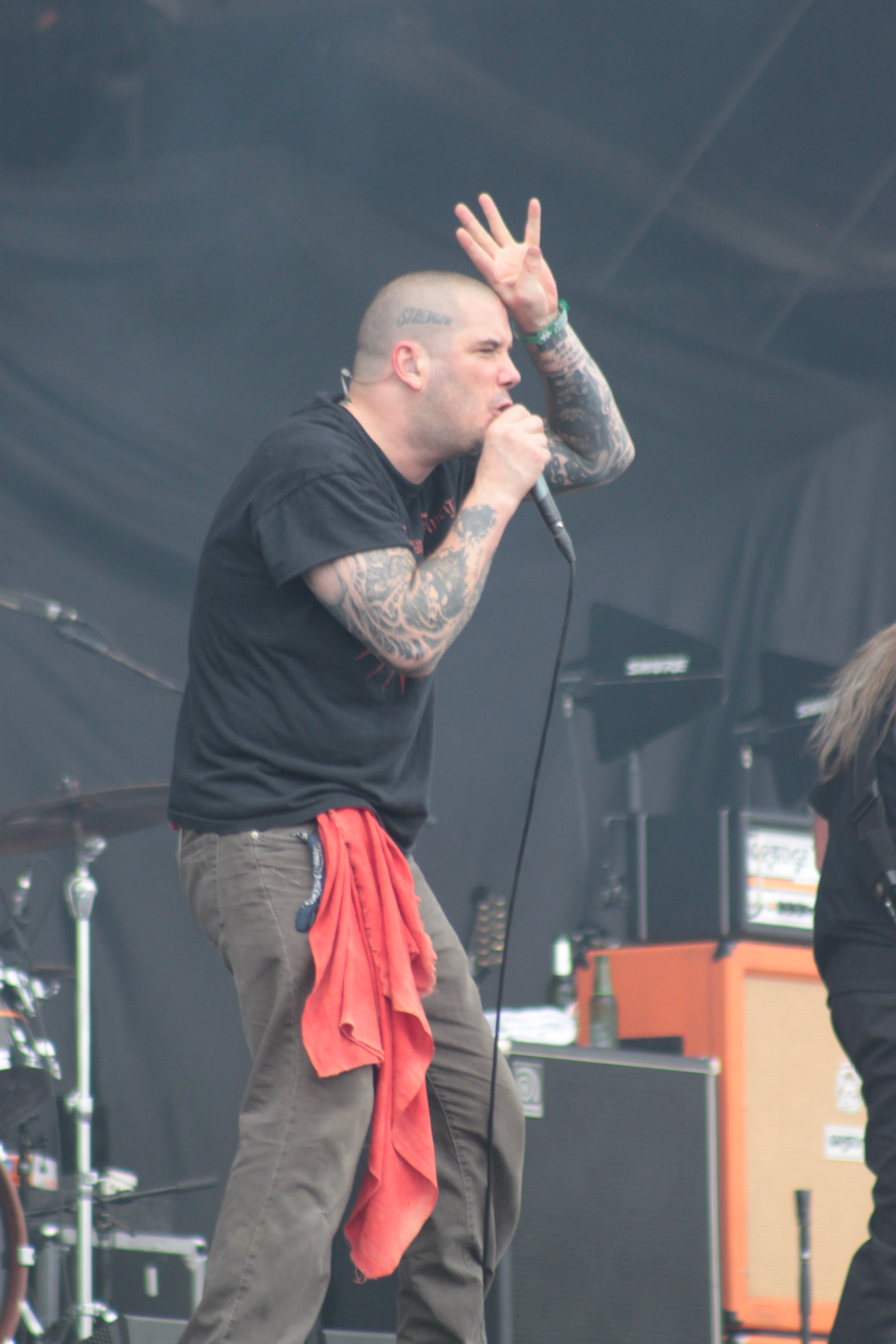
Phil Anselmo, 2013

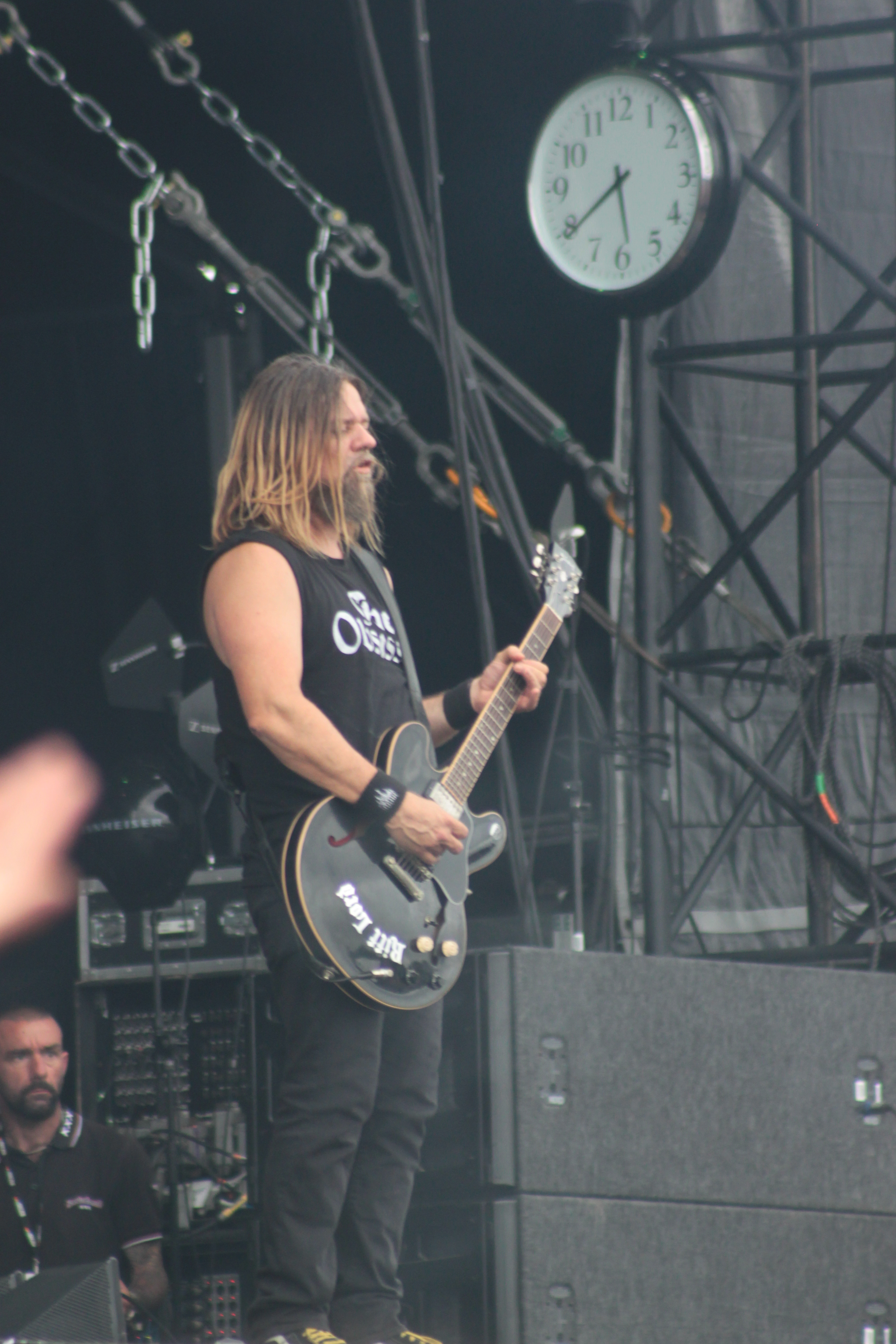
Pepper Keenan, 2013

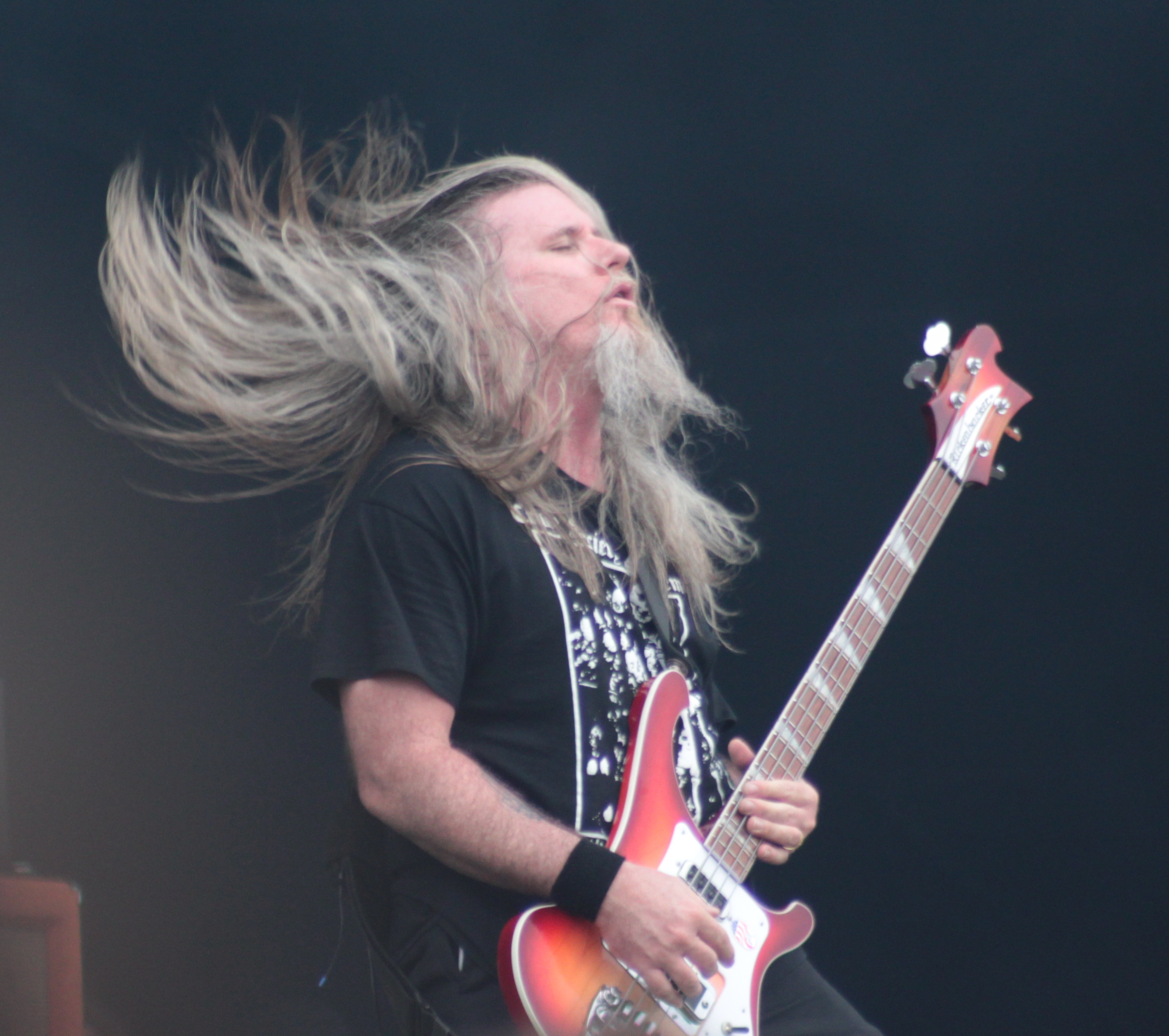
Pat Bruders, 2013

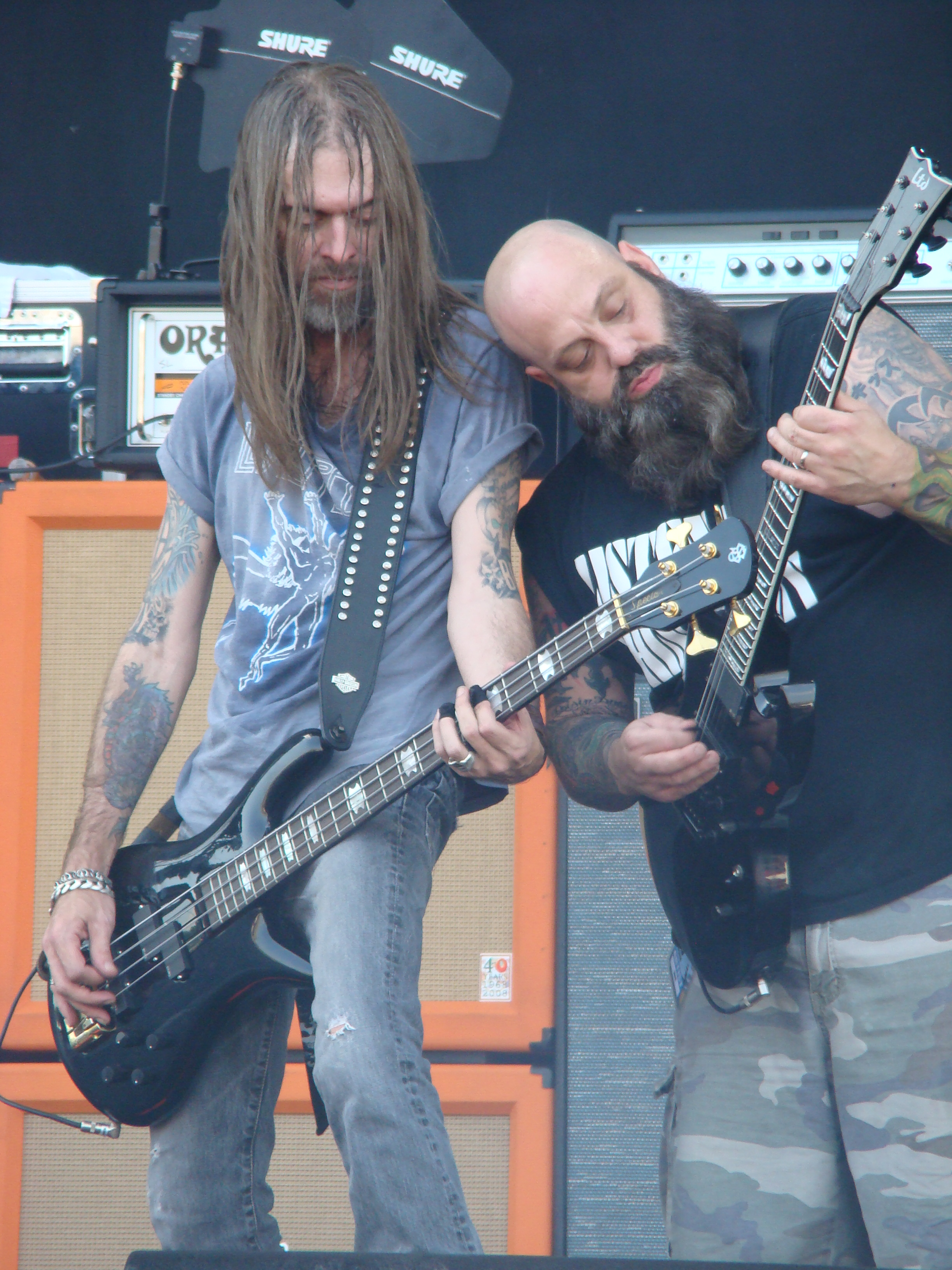
Rex Brown (left) and Kirk Windstein, 2009

== Discography ==
=== Studio albums ===
Year	Album details	Peak chart positions								Sales
Year	Album details	US	AUS	FIN	FRA	GER	IRL	SWE	UK	Sales
1995	NOLA: Released: September 19, 1995; Label: East West	57	75	—	—	—	—	—	68	US: 232,847
2002	Down II: A Bustle in Your Hedgerow: Released: March 26, 2002; Label: Elektra	44	45	—	—	67	—	—	80	US: 121,002
2007	Over the Under: Released: September 25, 2007; Label: Roadrunner	26	60	30	114	65	42	45	46	
2026	Volume V: Released: November 20, 2026; Label: Nuclear Blast	—	—	—	—	—	—	—	—	
"—" denotes a release that did not chart.

=== Extended plays ===
Year	EP details	Peak chart positions					
Year	EP details	US	AUS	FIN	FRA	GER	UK
2012	Down IV – Part I: Released: September 18, 2012; Label: Roadrunner	35	58	—	163	86	57
2014	Down IV – Part II: Released: May 13, 2014; Label: Roadrunner	23	79	21	81	88	50

=== Live albums ===
Year	Album details	Peak chart positions	
Year	Album details	FRA	GER
2010	Diary of a Mad Band: Europe in the Year of VI: Released: October 5, 2010; Label: Roadrunner	147	93

=== Singles ===
Year	Song	Album
1995	"Lifer"	NOLA
1995	"Stone the Crow"	NOLA
1995	"Rehab"	NOLA
2002	"Beautifully Depressed"	Down II: A Bustle in Your Hedgerow...
2002	"Ghosts Along the Mississippi"	Down II: A Bustle in Your Hedgerow...
2007	"Beneath the Tides"	Over the Under
2007	"Mourn"	Over the Under
2007	"I Scream"	Over the Under
2007	"On March the Saints"	Over the Under
2012	"Witchtripper"	Down IV – Part I
2014	"We Knew Him Well..."	Down IV – Part II
2026	"Right Place, Wrong Time" (Dr. John cover)	non-album single
2026	"Blood Oath"	Volume V
2026	"The Myth"	Volume V

=== Music videos ===
- "Stone the Crow" (1995)
- "Ghosts Along the Mississippi" (2002)
- "On March the Saints" (2007)
- "N.O.D." (2008)
- "Witchtripper" (2012)
- "We Knew Him Well..." (2014)
- "Conjure" (2015)
- "Right Place, Wrong Time" (Dr. John cover) (2026)
- "Blood Oath" (2026)
- "The Myth" (2026)
- "They Walk The Night" (2026)
