= Kingdom of Sorrow (album) =

Studio album by Kingdom of Sorrow
- Released: February 19, 2008
- Recorded: Planet Z Studios
- Genre: Sludge metal, metalcore
- Length: 38:32
- Label: Relapse
- Producer: Zeuss, Jamey Jasta

Kingdom of Sorrow chronology
Kingdom of Sorrow (2008)	Behind the Blackest Tears (2010)

Professional ratings
Review scores
Source	Rating
AllMusic	3/5 stars
Blabbermouth.net	6.5/10

Kingdom of Sorrow is the self-titled debut album by Kingdom of Sorrow, a sludge metal group featuring Jamey Jasta of Hatebreed and Kirk Windstein of Crowbar and Down. The album was released by Relapse Records.

== Track listing ==
All songs written and composed by Jamey Jasta and Kirk Windstein.

No.	Title	Length
1.	"Hear This Prayer for Her"	3:55
2.	"Grieve a Lifetime"	3:23
3.	"Piece It All Back Together"	3:31
4.	"Lead into Demise"	3:12
5.	"Demon Eyes (Demonized)"	2:35
6.	"With Unspoken Words"	3:20
7.	"Free the Fallen"	2:48
8.	"Screaming into the Sky"	5:37
9.	"Lead the Ghosts Astray"	2:31
10.	"Begging for the Truth"	3:32
11.	"Buried in Black"	4:05
Total length:		38:32

== Personnel ==
Kingdom of Sorrow

- Jamey Jasta – vocals
- Kirk Windstein – guitar, vocals

Additional studio musicians

- Derek Kerswill – drums
- Steve Gibb – guitar
- Zeuss – guitar

Production

- Produced by Zeuss and Jamey Jasta
- Engineered and mixed by Zeuss
- Mastered by Alan Douches
