= Kingdom of Sorrow =

American sludge metal band

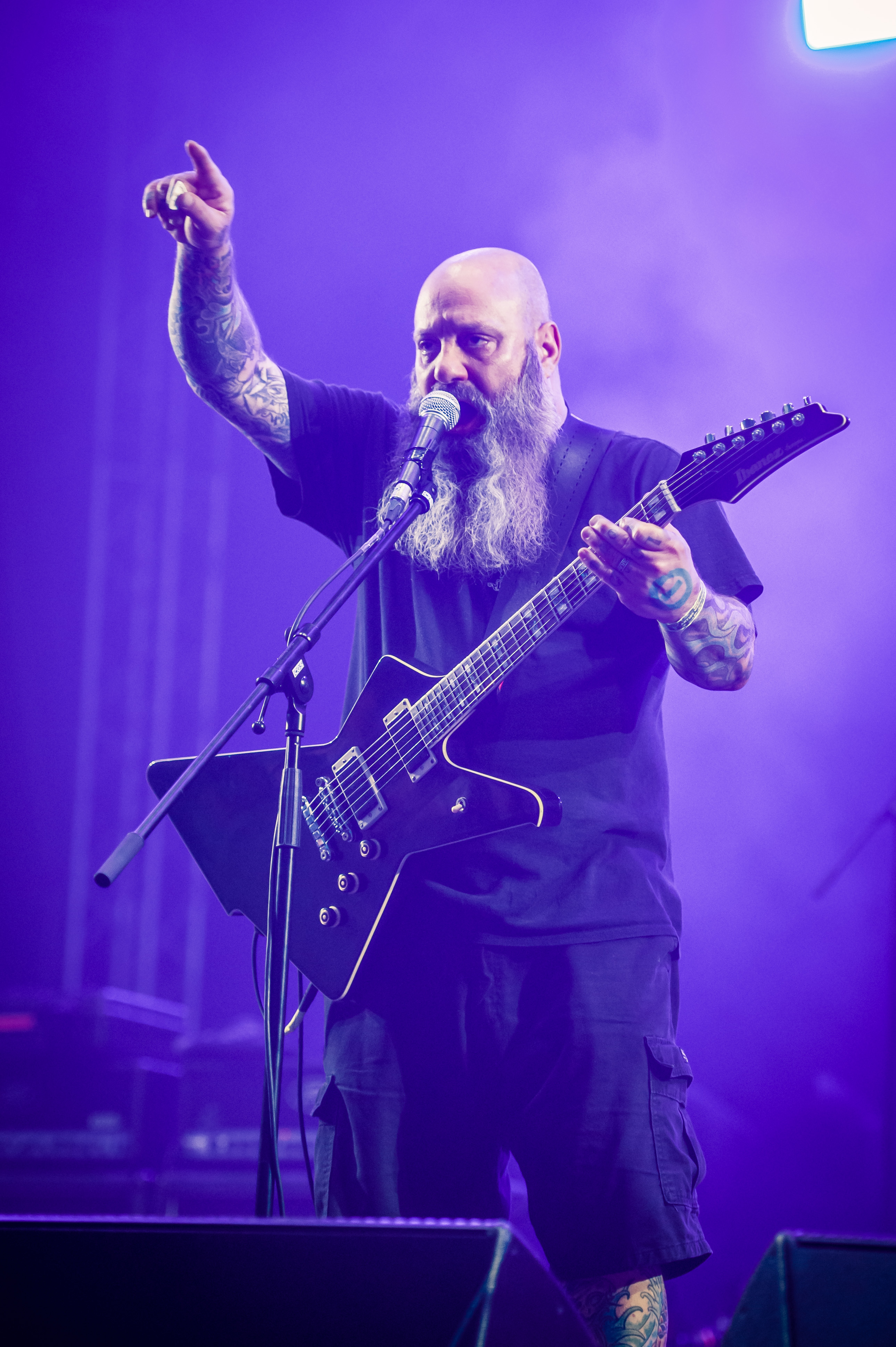
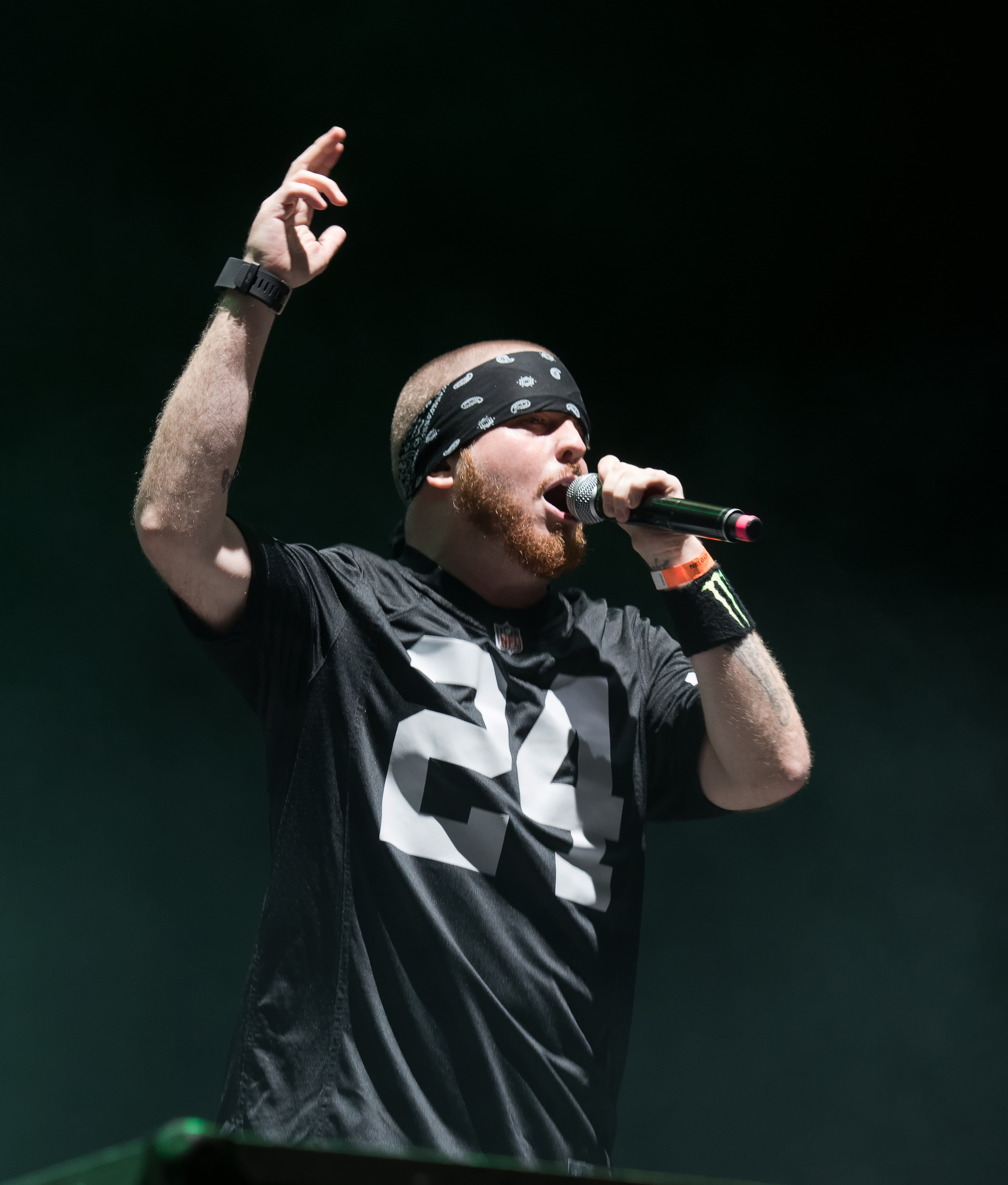
- Kirk Windstein and Jamey Jasta

Background information
- Origin: New Orleans, Louisiana, U.S.
- Genres: Sludge metal, metalcore
- Years active: 2005–present
- Label: Relapse Records
- Members: Jamey Jasta; Kirk Windstein; Charlie Bellmore; Nick Bellmore
- Past members: Derek Kerswill; Steve Gibb

Kingdom of Sorrow is an American sludge metal band that features Kirk Windstein of Crowbar and Down, along with Jamey Jasta of Hatebreed. Formed in 2005, the band has released two studio albums.

== History ==
Kingdom of Sorrow was founded when Hatebreed frontman Jamey Jasta introduced himself to Down/Crowbar guitarist Kirk Windstein at a show at Pearl Street in Northampton, Massachusetts. A short time later Jasta, who actively booked shows throughout New England in the early nineties, put up the cash for a Napalm Death/Crowbar show in order that Hatebreed could play with one of their favorite bands. Ever since then, the two have remained in close contact and became friends over the subsequent decade.

Jasta and Hatebreed invited Crowbar out for a UK run of dates in March 2005. It was there that the two friends decided to create a band based on their mutual affinity for bands of the likes of Black Sabbath, Iron Maiden, and Pantera.

In May 2005, the duo recorded in Silver Bullet Studios in Connecticut, and Kirk relocated after Hurricane Katrina to write and assemble what would become the first Kingdom of Sorrow album. The first taste of the untitled project surfaced in the form of the track "Buried in Black" on Roadrunner Records' MTV2 Headbangers Ball: The Revenge compilation, released in April 2006.

Songs were deconstructed, reconstructed, written and recorded again in Planet Z Studios with Zeuss until the duo was completely satisfied with the outcome. Jasta commented on the writing process, "It really was probably the best time I've ever had in the studio. As far as creatively...it was such a liberating thing. We felt like, 'It's a new band. It doesn't matter what anybody thinks.' We're just doing it because we want to do it. So it was a totally genuine and pure creative process."

Kingdom of Sorrow signed a deal with Relapse Records in fall 2007, and made their live debut on February 27, 2008, at the Worcester Palladium in Worcester, Massachusetts, with Thy Will Be Done as direct support. A subsequent tour followed with support from Dead to Fall and Thy Will Be Done.

On August 5 and 6, 2008, Kingdom of Sorrow played at the First Annual Mayhem Festival on the Jägermeister Stage at the Comcast Center for the Performing Arts in Mansfield, Massachusetts and the Nassau Coliseum in Long Island, New York, respectively.

Through a Myspace blog on March 30, 2010, the band announced that their next album was titled Behind the Blackest Tears; it was released on June 8, 2010, via Relapse Records. For a period in 2010, Kirk Windstein left the band to enter rehab, with Kenny Hickey of Type O Negative taking his place at Ozzfest tour dates, and other shows that year.

It was announced on January 31, 2011, that the band would be playing at the 2011 Mayhem Festival, on the Jägermeister Stage.

=== Debut release ===
Kingdom of Sorrow's self-titled album debuted at number 131 on the U.S. Billboard charts and sold 6,000 records in its first week of release.

== Band members ==
=== Current ===
- Jamey Jasta – vocals (2005–present)
- Kirk Windstein – guitars, vocals (2005–present)
- Charlie Bellmore – guitars (2010–present)
- Nick Bellmore – drums (2010–present)

=== Former ===
- Derek Kerswill – drums (2007–2008)
- Steve Gibb – guitars (2007–2010)

=== Live ===
- Kenny Hickey – guitars (fill-in for Kirk Windstein in 2008 and Ozzfest 2010 tour dates)
- Phil Zeller – bass (2008)
- Matt Brunson – bass (2009–2010)
- Christopher Taylor Beaudette – bass (2011–present)
- Kanky Lora – drums (2011)

== Discography ==
Date of US release	Title	Label	US Billboard peak
February 19, 2008	Kingdom of Sorrow	Relapse Records	131
June 8, 2010	Behind the Blackest Tears	Relapse Records	151
