= Behind the Blackest Tears =

Studio album by Kingdom of Sorrow
- Released: June 8, 2010
- Recorded: Planet Z Studios
- Genre: Sludge metal, metalcore
- Length: 40:35
- Label: Relapse
- Producer: Jamey Jasta, Kingdom of Sorrow

Kingdom of Sorrow chronology
Kingdom of Sorrow (2008)	Behind the Blackest Tears (2010)

Professional ratings
Review scores
Source	Rating
AllMusic	3.5/5 stars
Metalholic Magazine	9.2/10
Rock Sound	9/10 stars

Behind the Blackest Tears is the second studio album by Kingdom of Sorrow, a sludge metal group featuring Jamey Jasta of Hatebreed and Kirk Windstein of Crowbar and Down. The album was released by Relapse Records.

== Track listing ==
No.	Title	Length
1.	"Enlightened to Extinction"	3:47
2.	"God's Law in the Devil's Land"	3:56
3.	"Monuments of Ash"	3:34
4.	"Behind the Blackest Tears"	3:08
5.	"Envision the Divide"	3:12
6.	"From Heroes to Dust"	3:46
7.	"Along the Path to Ruin"	4:07
8.	"With Barely a Breath"	3:42
9.	"The Death We Owe"	3:46
10.	"Sleeping Beast"	2:34
11.	"Torchlight Procession"	2:57
12.	"Salvation Denied"	2:08
Total length:		40:35

=== Special edition bonus tracks ===
13. "Soldiers of Hell" – 3:29 (Running Wild cover)
14. "No Class" – 2:39 (Motörhead cover)

== Personnel ==
- Jamey Jasta – lead vocals
- Kirk Windstein – guitars, backing vocals
- Charlie Bellmore – guitars, bass
- Nick Bellmore – drums
