= Craig Nunenmacher =

American musician

Craig Nunenmacher is an American musician, best known as the former drummer for heavy metal bands Black Label Society and Crowbar. He joined BLS in July 2000 while playing for Crowbar, who were touring with BLS at the time. The original BLS drummer, Phil Ondich, left the band mid-tour and, to keep the tour on the road, Nunenmacher filled in for Ondich, playing for both Crowbar and BLS for the rest of the tour. A few weeks into the tour, he was asked to join the band permanently.

In 2003, during a short break from Black Label Society (as front-man Zakk Wylde was focusing on a full-time tour with Ozzy Osbourne), Nunenmacher reunited with Kirk Windstein and wrote and recorded Crowbar's Lifesblood for the Downtrodden album, which had Pantera's Rex Brown on bass guitar, and a guest performance on the track "Lifesblood" by former BLS bass guitarist Steve Gibb on guitar.

In 2006, he launched his website. However, sometime since then the domain right expired and it is now overtaken by cybersquatters, adding a faux search-page instead. He is sponsored by Pearl Drums.

In March 2008, it was announced that Nunenmacher's albums—Crowbar (1993), Time Heals Nothing (1995) and the Live+1 EP (1995)—would be reissued in Europe on April 21, 2008, with bonus and multimedia tracks.

In February 2010, it was announced that Nunenmacher had resigned as Black Label Society's drummer. He currently resides in Mississippi with his wife and son and has taken up a career change in logistics with a Fortune 500 3rd Party Logistics company. Nunenmacher is the brother of Stevie Blaze from the band Lillian Axe which he was briefly a member of.

== Discography ==
=== Crowbar ===
Year	Title	Label
1991	Obedience Thru Suffering	Pavement Music
1993	Crowbar	Pavement Music
1994	Live +1 (EP)	Pavement Music
1995	Time Heals Nothing	Pavement Music
2005	Lifesblood for the Downtrodden	Candlelight Records

=== Black Label Society ===
Year	Title	Label
2001	Alcohol Fueled Brewtality	
2002	1919 Eternal	
2003	The Blessed Hellride	
2004	Hangover Music Vol. VI	
2005	Mafia	
2005	Kings of Damnation 98–04 (two-disc career retrospective of Zakk Wylde)	
2006	Shot to Hell	
2006	The European Invasion – Doom Troopin' Live (DVD)	
