= Steve Gibb =

British-American guitarist (born 1973)

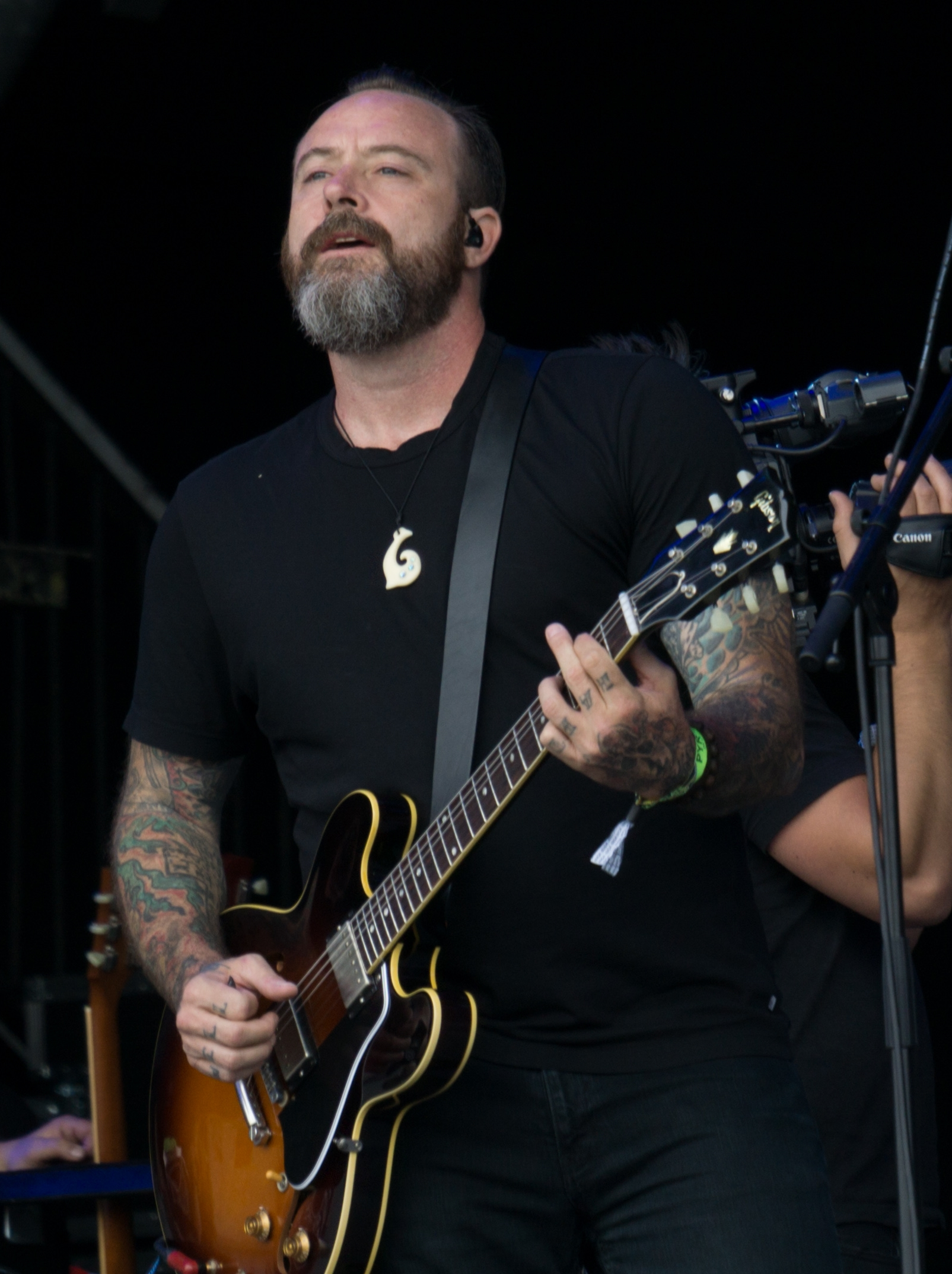
- Gibb in 2017

Background information
- Born: Stephen Thadeus Crompton Gibb; 1 December 1973 (age 52); London, England
- Genres: Heavy metal; hard rock
- Occupation: Guitarist
- Years active: 1988–present
- Member of: Saigon Kick
- Formerly of: 58; Black Label Society; Crowbar; Kingdom of Sorrow; The Underbellys; SkilletHead

Stephen Thadeus Crompton Gibb (born 1 December 1973) is a British-American guitarist. He has been a member of numerous hard rock and metal bands including 58, Black Label Society, Crowbar, Kingdom of Sorrow, The Underbellys, SkilletHead, and Saigon Kick. He is the son of Barry Gibb and is currently playing guitar as part of his father's band.

== Early life ==
Gibb was born in London, England, and raised in Miami, Florida, the first-born son of Barry Gibb and Linda Gibb. At the age of three, he began playing piano, but when he was about thirteen he decided he would like to play guitar. After attending a Van Halen gig, he was inspired to work harder at the instrument.

== Music career ==
=== 1980s ===
On 14 October 1988, Gibb and nine other students at The Lear School in Miami performed their first concert. The students performed at lunchtimes and for special events at the school.

That same year Gibb and friends formed their own band, which was indecisively christened NNY for No Name Yet. Later they would settle on the name ZEX, and in February of that year they landed a gig at Woody's, a Miami club owned by the Rolling Stones' guitarist Ronnie Wood. Later in the year Gibb would work as a guitar technician on the Bee Gees One For All tour.

=== 1990s ===
In 1991, after being his father's guitar technician for two years, Gibb enrolled in a music school in Miami where he got his degree. He began writing songs, the first of which was a solo effort, "Whiskey Jam". Other songs penned during this time were "Shadow of Your Dreams" with Emerson Forth and Deniz Kose. "Hole in My Soul" was also co-written with Kose. The song "Ren and Stevie" was co-written with Middle Ear Studio engineer, Scott Glasel and his girlfriend, Amanda Green. This song was a take-off on the Nickelodeon cartoon series Ren and Stimpy.

In 1992, Gibb and others including Forth, formed a metal band, SkilletHead, which performed the club circuit in and around Miami. That year Gibb also made occasional appearances as a guitarist backing the Bee Gees. In February 1997, Gibb joined The Underbellys. This five-piece band included Billy Velvet (lead vocals), Joel Dasilva (guitarist), Sean 'Evil' Gerovitz (bass), Randy Blitz (drums) and Gibb on guitar. The band played venues including the Viper Room in Los Angeles and Don Hills in Greenwich Village. The Underbellys, including Gibb, recorded for Columbia Records with Pat DiNizio of The Smithereens as their record producer. This did not result in a recording contract, and the band split up. In November 1997, Gibb performed live with his father and uncles for their 'One Night Only' concert in Las Vegas. He also toured with the Smithereens between 1997 and 98.

=== 2000s ===
Gibb joined Nikki Sixx, Bucket Baker and Dave Darling in 58. The concept Sixx had in mind when he formed 58 was of a non-touring, internet promoted entity, that would feature on his new record label, Americoma Records. The name of the band stemmed from the year 1958, in which both Sixx and Darling were born. Their sound, as exemplified on the band's only album released in early 2000, was a self-described mixture of "glam, hip hop, rock, pop, funk and a car crash". Gibb co-wrote "Who We Are", which featured on Diet for a New America.

The same year, Gibb appeared in the music video for Black Label Society's "Counterfeit God" from their 2000 release Stronger than Death. The band did not have a permanent bassist at the time (for the video Mark Wahlberg was stand-in) Gibb joined Zakk Wylde's Black Label Society as bass player in the spring 2000. Alcohol Fueled Brewtality, Black Label Society's live album was recorded in October 2000 and released on 16 January 2001. Gibb's backing vocals can be heard on tracks like "Stronger Than Death". The Ozzfest 2001: The Second Millennium album included the track "Superterrorizer" recorded at Alpine Valley Music Theatre, East Troy, Wisconsin on 9 June. Shortly after this, just weeks into the American Ozzfest schedule, Gibb left the band for personal reasons.

In early 2004, Kirk Windstein (founder of Crowbar) planned a rebirth for Crowbar and rebuilt the band with Gibb as guitarist, Pat Bruders on bass and Tommy Buckley on drums. Their European tour of 2004 was a success, the highlight of which was their performance at the With Full Force Festival in Leipzig, Germany. This became the core of the 2007 released DVD Crowbar: Live With Full Force Gibb, assisting John-Martin Vogel, produced a mix of live footage, backstage capers and interview pieces. The band has consistently toured Europe, the United Kingdom and the United States. The band's 2005 album, Lifesblood for the Downtrodden, was mastered at Middle Ear Studios (owned by Gibb's father).

In 2005, Windstein teamed up with Jamey Jasta of Hatebreed to form a new side venture called Kingdom of Sorrow. The band's self-titled debut album was released on 19 February 2008 by Relapse Records. It debuted at No. 131 on the US Billboard charts and sold 6,000 records in its first week of release. The album was recorded at Planet Z with producer Zeuss, known for his work with Shadows Fall and many others. Gibb performed some solos and leads on a few tracks on this album and also went on the initial promotional tour I late February early March 2008. In 2007, Gibb played on his father's single "Drown On the River".

Gibb left Crowbar in 2009, citing family and business commitments in Miami.

=== 2010s ===
When his father Barry Gibb put together a show band to take around the world on his first solo tour, called the Mythology Tour, Steve joined as guitar lead as he had for numerous annual Love & Hope Balls (see below).

The first leg of the tour took in Australia and New Zealand in February 2013. Gibb performed as a solo the bluegrass track written by Maurice Gibb "On Time", and took second vocals on the Bee Gees hit "I've Gotta Get a Message to You". The second leg went to England and Northern Ireland in September 2013. The track "Fight (No Matter How Long)" was added as Gibb's second solo. The track had been written in 1986 as part of the Bunbury Tails. The third leg was six US dates in May 2014. As part of the promotion, Gibb performed with his father on The Tonight Show with Jimmy Fallon, 21 May 2014. In 2015, Gibb toured North America as the guitarist for the band Jasta fronted by Jamey Jasta.

Gibb joined the line-up of Saigon Kick at the Broward County, Florida centenary celebrations, the free street festival in Fort Lauderdale on 3 October 2015.

== Other work ==
=== Film ===
The Outkast Talent Agency in Miami was asked to find numerous extras for the Michael Bay film Bad Boys II, released in 2003. Gibb appeared briefly in the opening scenes as a klansman.

The track "Stormy" performed by 58 was used in The Dr. Jekyll & Mr. Hyde Rock n' Roll Musical in 2003. It was nominated for Best Film Score at Europe's Fennec Awards.

In September 2006, Gibb, his father, and brother Ashley wrote "Drown on the River", which is included in the 2007 Burt Reynolds film Deal.

The Oliver Schmitz film Shepherds and Butchers (2016) featured the track "Angels" during the closing credits that was co-written by Gibb with his father and brother Ashley

=== Charity performances ===
For many years, Gibb's parents have been international chairpersons of the Love and Hope Committee for the Diabetes Research Institute Foundation based in Miami, Florida. Annually, a black tie gala is held to raise funds for research and frequently Barry Gibb performs. In 2009, 2012 and 2014, Gibb accompanied his father. In 2009, he performed his own composition "Living in the Rain", dedicating this debut performance of the song to his wife Gloria.

At the 34th Love and Hope Ball, held at the Westin Diplomat Resort & Spa in 2008, Gibb, his siblings and their spouses were inducted as the first Young Society Honourees.
