= Crowbar (album) =

Studio album by Crowbar
- Released: October 12, 1993
- Recorded: New Orleans
- Genre: Sludge metal
- Length: 36:12
- Label: Pavement Music
- Producer: Phil Anselmo

Crowbar chronology
| Obedience thru Suffering (1991) | Crowbar (1993) | Time Heals Nothing (1995) |

Professional ratings
Review scores
| Source | Rating |
|---|---|
| AllMusic | 4/5 stars |

Crowbar is the second studio album by American sludge metal band Crowbar, released on October 12, 1993. It sold 100,000 copies on the now defunct independent label Pavement Music. The singles "All I Had (I Gave)" and "Existence Is Punishment" were played on MTV and received international attention. Crowbar was recorded in New Orleans in 1992 and produced by Phil Anselmo, the frontman of Pantera and a childhood friend of Crowbar founder Kirk Windstein.

== Track listing ==
All songs written by Crowbar, except where noted.

| No. | Title | Length |
|---|---|---|
| 1. | "High Rate Extinction" | 2:44 |
| 2. | "All I Had (I Gave)" | 3:11 |
| 3. | "Will That Never Dies" | 3:56 |
| 4. | "Fixation" | 3:46 |
| 5. | "No Quarter" (Led Zeppelin cover) | 4:30 |
| 6. | "Self-Inflicted" | 2:45 |
| 7. | "Negative Pollution" | 3:11 |
| 8. | "Existence Is Punishment" | 4:29 |
| 9. | "Holding Nothing" | 3:13 |
| 10. | "I Have Failed" | 4:22 |
| Total length: | | 36:12 |

== Personnel ==
- Kirk Windstein – guitar, vocals
- Matt Thomas – guitar
- Todd Strange – bass
- Craig Nunenmacher – drums

== Music videos ==
- "All I Had (I Gave)"
- "Existence Is Punishment"

Both videos appeared on Beavis and Butt-Head. Butt-Head commented that in "All I Had (I Gave)", vocalist Kirk Windstein looked like he was defecating on the toilet and that the band's music sounded "slow and fat". "Existence Is Punishment" appears on the Beavis and Butt-Head: The Mike Judge Collection #3 DVD, originally in "Safe House".
