= Time Heals Nothing (disambiguation) =

Time Heals Nothing is a 1995 album by Crowbar.

Time Heals Nothing may also refer to:

- "Time Heals Nothing", a song by Crowbar on the 1995 album Time Heals Nothing
- "Time Heals Nothing", a song by Danko Jones on the 2006 album Sleep Is the Enemy
- "Time Heals Nothing", a song by Dismember on the 2006 album The God That Never Was
