= Tony Costanza =

American drummer (1968–2020)

- Born: July 2, 1968
- Died: August 4, 2020 (aged 52)
- Genres: Groove metal, thrash metal
- Occupation: Drummer
- Years active: 1986–2020
- Formerly of: Papsmear; Machine Head; Debris Inc.; Crowbar; Crisis

Tony Costanza (July 2, 1968 – August 4, 2020) was an American drummer, known for being the first drummer for the heavy metal band Machine Head, playing in the band from 1992 to 1993.

== Career ==
Costanza received jazz lessons from Irv Kluger. Influenced by such drummers as Dave Lombardo, Gene Hoglan and Terry Bozzio, whom Tony considered his favorite drummer.

=== Machine Head ===
Costanza did two shows with Machine Head. A kegger/house party in Oakland, California and the first "official" Machine Head show in Las Vegas on August 29, 1992.

In 1993, he decided to leave the band, stating, "I left the band, because I was very young and new at playing drums, especially double bass. The band called for a lot of double bass. Basically, out of my own insecurities, I self-destructed. I've suffered a lot from the loss and will never forget not playing in my favorite band ever, but I had to do what was healthy for me and the band. I was even asked to rejoin, if I had certain parts very solid on the double bass aspect of it all, but I still felt I couldn't give the band what they needed."

He wrote the drums for seven songs from their debut album Burn My Eyes: "A Thousand Lies", "The Rage to Overcome", "Death Church", "A Nation on Fire", "Blood for Blood", "I'm Your God Now", and "Block" (originally titled "Fuck it All").

== Death ==
Constanza died in his sleep on August 4, 2020, aged 52. No official cause of death was revealed.

== Discography ==
With Papsmear

- Fear & Loathing in Las Vegas (Demo) (1986)
- Lunch for the P.M.R.C. (Demo) (1987)

With Machine Head

- Demo (1993)

With Crowbar

- Sonic Excess in Its Purest Form (2001)
