= 1919 Eternal =

Studio album by Black Label Society
- Released: March 5, 2002
- Recorded: 2001–2002
- Genre: Heavy metal; southern metal; sludge metal; groove metal; hard rock
- Length: 60:08
- Label: Spitfire
- Producer: Zakk Wylde

Black Label Society chronology
Alcohol Fueled Brewtality (2001)	1919 Eternal (2002)	The Blessed Hellride (2003)

Singles from 1919 Eternal
- 1. "Bleed for Me" Released: 2002

Professional ratings
Review scores
Source	Rating
AllMusic	3/5 stars
Brave Words & Bloody Knuckles	8/10
Metal.de	8/10
Rock Hard	8/10

1919 Eternal (also stylized as 1919★Eternal) is the third studio album by American heavy metal band Black Label Society. It was released on March 5, 2002, and was written for Zakk Wylde's father.

== Writing ==
Five songs from the album sessions were written by Zakk Wylde for Ozzy Osbourne's album Down to Earth. Osbourne rejected the songs because they were "too Black Label", so Wylde kept them for this album. The songs were "Bleed for Me", "Life, Birth, Blood, Doom", "Demise of Sanity", an alternate piano version of "Bridge to Cross", and a demo called "Find a Way". The latter two were never released. These original demo songs featured drummer Christian Werr, a friend of Wylde's who happened to be in the right place at the right time to record the tracks. Later, when Wylde went to re-record these demos for 1919 Eternal, Christian's drum tracks were used for "Bleed for Me", "Life, Birth, Blood, Doom", and "Demise of Sanity", which is why Craig Nunenmacher does not appear on these songs.

== Artwork ==
The album artwork is based on a German Nazi propaganda poster used to recruit Dutchmen into the Schutzstaffel (SS).

== Track listing ==
All tracks are written by Zakk Wylde, except "America the Beautiful" by Katharine Lee Bates and Samuel A. Ward.

No.	Title	Length
1.	"Bleed for Me"	5:31
2.	"Lords of Destruction"	5:11
3.	"Demise of Sanity"	3:23
4.	"Life, Birth, Blood, Doom"	4:21
5.	"Bridge to Cross"	5:49
6.	"Battering Ram"	2:22
7.	"Speedball"	0:58
8.	"Graveyard Disciples"	3:20
9.	"Genocide Junkies"	5:53
10.	"Lost Heaven"	4:24
11.	"Refuse to Bow Down"	4:53
12.	"Mass Murder Machine"	5:47
13.	"Berserkers"	5:06
14.	"America the Beautiful" (Instrumental)	3:17
15.	"Llabdeeps" (Japanese edition bonus track)	1:00*
Total length:		60:08

Note: The 15th track is an unlabeled bonus track on the Japanese edition of the album, "Speedball" reversed.

== Credits ==
- Zakk Wylde – vocals, guitars, bass
- Robert Trujillo – bass on "Demise of Sanity" and "Life, Birth, Blood, Doom"
- Craig Nunenmacher – drums

== Additional personnel ==
- Christian Werr – drums (tracks 1, 3, 4)

Production

- Produced by Zakk Wylde
- Associate producer – Eddie Mapp
- Engineered by Eddie Mapp and Sam Storey, assisted by Lou Michaels and Kent Hitchcock
- Editing by Kent Huffnagle
- Mastered by Ron Boustead
- Management – Bob Ringe (Survival Management)
- A&R – Paul Bibeau, Tami Fukatami
- Art concept – Zakk Wylde
- Art direction and design – Zakk Wylde and Peter Tsakiris (Drunken Monkey Studios)
- Illustrations – Adam Guyot (Eternal Art Tattoo, Canyon County, California)
- Photography – Maryanne Bilham

== Charts ==
Chart performance for 1919 Eternal
Chart (2002)	Peak position
US Billboard 200	149
US Independent Albums (Billboard)	7
