= Symmetry in Black =

Studio album by Crowbar
- Released: May 26, 2014
- Genre: Sludge metal
- Length: 48:04
- Labels: eOne (US); Century Media (Europe)
- Producers: Kirk Windstein, Duane Simoneaux

Crowbar chronology
| Sever the Wicked Hand (2011) | Symmetry in Black (2014) | The Serpent Only Lies (2016) |

Professional ratings
Review scores
| Source | Rating |
|---|---|
| All About the Rock | 9.5/10 stars |
| AllMusic | 4/5 stars |
| Blabbermouth.net | 8.5/10 stars |
| Pitchfork | 7.3/10 |

Symmetry in Black is the tenth studio album by the American sludge metal band Crowbar. It was released on May 26, 2014 in Europe through Century Media Records and on May 27, 2014 in North America through eOne Music. This was the only album to feature bassist Jeff Golden, who was fired from the band in 2016.

== Track listing ==
All lyrics written by Kirk Windstein unless noted; all music by Kirk Windstein and Matt Brunson unless noted.

| No. | Title | Lyrics | Music | Length |
|---|---|---|---|---|
| 1. | "Walk with Knowledge Wisely" | | | 5:21 |
| 2. | "Symmetry in White" | Robin Windstein, K. Windstein | | 4:08 |
| 3. | "The Taste of Dying" | | K. Windstein | 3:12 |
| 4. | "Reflection of Deceit" | R. Windstein, K. Windstein | | 5:00 |
| 5. | "Ageless Decay" | R. Windstein, K. Windstein | | 3:40 |
| 6. | "Amaranthine" | | K. Windstein | 2:46 |
| 7. | "The Foreboding" | | | 4:13 |
| 8. | "Shaman of Belief" | R. Windstein, K. Windstein | | 3:38 |
| 9. | "Teach the Blind to See" | | | 3:41 |
| 10. | "A Wealth of Empathy" | | | 4:08 |
| 11. | "Symbolic Suicide" | | | 4:21 |
| 12. | "The Piety of Self-Loathing" (instrumental) | (instrumental) | | 3:56 |
| Total length: | | | | 48:04 |

== Personnel ==
- Kirk Windstein – vocals, rhythm guitar
- Matt Brunson – lead guitar
- Jeff Golden – bass
- Tommy Buckley – drums

=== Production ===
- Kirk Windstein – production
- Duane Simoneaux – production
- Josh Wilbur – mixing
- Zeuss – mastering
