= Odd Fellows Rest =

Studio album by Crowbar
- Released: July 7, 1998; August 24, 1999
- Recorded: Festival Studios (Kenner, Louisiana), apart from drums at Ultrasonic Studios (New Orleans)
- Genre: Sludge metal
- Length: 54:08
- Labels: Mayhem; Spitfire
- Producers: Keith Falgout; Crowbar

Crowbar chronology
Broken Glass (1996)	Odd Fellows Rest (1998)	Equilibrium (2000)

Professional ratings
Review scores
Source	Rating
AllMusic	3/5 stars
Sputnikmusic	3.5/5
Rock Hard	9.5/10 stars
Sea of Tranquility	4.5/5 stars

Odd Fellows Rest is the fifth studio album by American sludge metal band Crowbar, released on July 7, 1998, through Mayhem Records. It was re-released on August 24, 1999, via Spitfire Records and featured a bonus track. It is the first album to feature Acid Bath and Goatwhore guitarist Sammy Duet, and the last album to feature drummer and Eyehategod guitarist Jimmy Bower.

The album is named after the cemetery in New Orleans.

Kirk Windstein described the album as "the first record where the Crowbar rulebook was thrown out of the window".

== Reception ==
Odd Fellows Rest has received critical acclaim. Although the album takes a more melodic approach both musically and lyrically, the album quickly became a fan favorite in the New Orleans metal scene, and the song "Planets Collide" became a permanent staple at every performance.

The album was inducted into Decibel magazine's Hall of Fame in June 2017.

== Track listing ==
All tracks are written by Crowbar.

No.	Title	Length
1.	"Intro"	1:24
2.	"Planets Collide"	4:38
3.	"...And Suffer as One"	4:12
4.	"1000 Year Internal War"	4:02
5.	"To Carry the Load"	4:03
6.	"December's Spawn"	5:11
7.	"It's All in the Gravity"	4:14
8.	"Behind the Black Horizon"	6:02
9.	"New Man Born"	4:47
10.	"Scattered Pieces Lay"	5:23
11.	"Odd Fellows Rest"	6:08
12.	"On Frozen Ground"	4:00
Total length:		54:08

1999 re-release bonus track
No.	Title	Length
13.	"Remember Tomorrow" (Iron Maiden cover)	7:01

== Personnel ==
=== Crowbar ===
- Kirk Windstein – lead vocals, guitar
- Sammy Pierre Duet – guitar, backing vocals
- Todd Strange – bass
- Jimmy Bower (a.k.a. "Wicked Cricket") – drums

=== Additional musicians ===
- Big Mike The Testices – additional backing vocals
- Ross Karpelman – keyboards, piano, organ
- Sid Montz – additional percussion

=== Production ===
- Arranged by Crowbar
- Produced by Crowbar and Keith Falgout
- Recorded, engineered and mixed by Keith Falgout (vocals, guitars, bass guitar, keyboards) and David Ferrel (drums, percussion)
