= Equilibrium (Crowbar album) =

Studio album by Crowbar
- Released: March 7, 2000
- Recorded: Festival Studios (Kenner, Louisiana)
- Genre: Sludge metal
- Length: 50:45; 40:45 (excluding cover tracks)
- Label: Spitfire Records
- Producer: Keith Falgout and Kirk Windstein

Crowbar chronology
Odd Fellows Rest (1998)	Equilibrium (2000)	Sonic Excess in Its Purest Form (2001)

Professional ratings
Review scores
Source	Rating
AllMusic	2.5/5 stars
BraveWords	9/10
Kerrang!	4/5 stars
Rock Hard	9/10
Sputnikmusic	4/5 stars

Equilibrium is the sixth studio album by American sludge metal band Crowbar, released in March 2000 through Spitfire Records. It was original bassist Todd Strange's final album with the band until his 2016 return.

== Track listing ==
No.	Title	Length
1.	"I Feel the Burning Sun"	3:37
2.	"Equilibrium"	4:40
3.	"Glass Full of Liquid Pain"	3:28
4.	"Command of Myself"	3:16
5.	"Down into the Rotting Earth"	5:16
6.	"To Touch the Hand of God"	5:06
7.	"Uncovering"	4:21
8.	"Buried Once Again"	4:04
9.	"Things You Can't Understand"	3:28
10.	"Euphoria Minus One"	3:24
11.	"Dream Weaver (Gary Wright cover)"	8:51
12.	"In a Gadda da Vida (Iron Butterfly cover, hidden track, a cappella)"	1:09
Total length:		50:45

== Personnel ==
- Kirk Windstein – vocals, guitar
- Sammy Pierre Duet – guitar
- Todd Strange – bass
- Sid Montz – drums

== Music videos ==
- "I Feel the Burning Sun"
