= Sonic Excess in Its Purest Form =

Studio album by Crowbar
- Released: August 21, 2001
- Genre: Sludge metal
- Length: 45:31
- Label: Spitfire
- Producer: Dave Fortman

Crowbar chronology
Equilibrium (2000)	Sonic Excess in Its Purest Form (2001)	Lifesblood for the Downtrodden (2005)

Sonic Excess in Its Purest Form is the seventh studio album by American sludge metal band Crowbar. It was released on August 21, 2001. It is the last album to feature guitarist Sammy Duet, and the first and only album to feature bassist Jeff Okoneski and ex-Machine Head drummer Tony Costanza.

Songs such as "The Lasting Dose" and "To Build a Mountain" have become mandatory staples on Crowbar's live setlists.

The front cover is of St. Anthony's Garden behind St. Louis Cathedral in New Orleans, Louisiana.

== Reception ==
Professional ratings
Review scores
Source	Rating
AllMusic	3/5 stars
Sputnikmusic	4.5/5 stars
BW&BK	8/10 stars

Sonic Excess in Its Purest Form has received critical acclaim. Robert Davis of Sputnikmusic gave the album a 4.5 out of 5 stars, noting "instrumentally the band has never sounded fresher or more alive" and "each and every song on 'Sonic excess…' is charged with more melancholy and beautiful solemnity than ever before". Pete Pardo of Sea of Tranquility gave the album 5 out of 5 stars, saying "this album shows that simply Crowbar are masters of what they do...one of the finest releases within its genre." German website metal.de named it the best metal album of 2001.

== Track listing ==
No.	Title	Length
1.	"The Lasting Dose"	4:12
2.	"To Build a Mountain"	3:58
3.	"Thru the Ashes (I've Watched You Burn)"	4:43
4.	"Awakening"	3:36
5.	"Repulsive in Its Splendid Beauty"	3:58
6.	"Counting Daze"	3:54
7.	"In Times of Sorrow" (instrumental)	2:38
8.	"It Pours from Me"	5:05
9.	"Suffering Brings Wisdom"	5:27
10.	"Failure to Delay Gratification"	3:07
11.	"Empty Room"	4:52
Total length:		45:31

== Personnel ==
- Kirk Windstein – vocals, guitar
- Sammy Pierre Duet – guitar
- Jeff "Okie" Okoneski – bass
- Tony Costanza – drums
