= The Blessed Hellride =

Studio album by Black Label Society
- Released: April 22, 2003
- Recorded: 2002–2003
- Studio: Paramount Studios, Hollywood, California; Cartee Day Studios, Nashville, Tennessee; Amerayacan Studios, North Hollywood, California
- Genre: Heavy metal; southern metal; groove metal; hard rock
- Length: 45:02
- Label: Spitfire
- Producer: Zakk Wylde

Black Label Society chronology
1919 Eternal (2002)	The Blessed Hellride (2003)	Boozed, Broozed & Broken-Boned (2003)

Professional ratings
Review scores
Source	Rating
AllMusic	3/5 stars
Metal.de	8/10

The Blessed Hellride is the fourth studio album by American heavy metal band Black Label Society. It contains a mix of heavy ("Stoned and Drunk", "Stillborn") and lighter ("The Blessed Hellride", "Dead Meadow") tracks.

The second track, "Doomsday Jesus", was featured on the soundtrack to the video game MTX Mototrax, but with altered lyrics. The third track, "Stillborn", is featured on the soundtrack of the game Guitar Hero: World Tour. Frontman Zakk Wylde was also a playable celebrity rockstar in that same game.

Ozzy Osbourne appears on the first single, "Stillborn", though his name was not used to promote the track. He is credited inside the booklet, however, due to Osbourne being on Sony Records at the time, Spitfire Records were not allowed to promote this song with Osbourne's name—a sticker on the cover of the album said "featuring special guest star".

The Japanese bonus track "F.U.N." is a joke song, presumably recorded while Wylde and Craig Nunenmacher were horsing around in the studio. The song's lyrics poke fun at the cheesiest of the 1980s hair band's "party" lyrics; Wylde himself noted that "parody" would be a charitable term, saying "That song is so ridiculous, I don't think you could mock anybody... No one sucks that much."

A song called "No Other" was recorded, mixed, and mastered for this album, however, it remained unreleased until the next album, Hangover Music Vol. VI.

== Track listing ==
No.	Title	Length
1.	"Stoned and Drunk"	5:02
2.	"Doomsday Jesus"	3:30
3.	"Stillborn" (feat. Ozzy Osbourne)	3:15
4.	"Suffering Overdue"	4:29
5.	"The Blessed Hellride"	4:32
6.	"Funeral Bell"	4:41
7.	"Final Solution"	4:04
8.	"Destruction Overdrive"	3:01
9.	"Blackened Waters"	3:56
10.	"We Live No More"	4:02
11.	"Dead Meadow"	4:30
Total length:		45:02

Japanese edition bonus track
No.	Title	Length
12.	"F.U.N."	2:58
Total length:		48:00

== Personnel ==
Black Label Society

- Zakk Wylde – guitars, vocals, bass, piano
- Craig Nunenmacher – drums

Production

- Produced by Zakk Wylde
- Associate producer and engineer – Eddie Mapp
- Assistant engineers – Christopher Rakestraw and Steve Crowder
- Mixed by Eddie Mapp and Zakk Wylde
- Mastered by Steve Marcussen
- Illustrations by Rob Arvizu
- Management – Bob Ringe (Survival Management)

== Charts ==
Chart performance for The Blessed Hellride
Chart (2004)	Peak position
US Billboard 200	50
US Independent Albums (Billboard)	2

== Additional sources ==
- Pratt, Greg (July 1, 2003). "The Blessed Hellride review by Exclaim!". Exclaim!.
