= Obedience thru Suffering =

Studio album by Crowbar
- Released: September 26, 1991
- Genre: Sludge metal
- Length: 43:15
- Label: Grind Core
- Producer: Mark Nawara, Lenny Moore, Crowbar

Crowbar chronology
Obedience thru Suffering (1991)	Crowbar (1993)

Alternative cover

Professional ratings
Review scores
Source	Rating
AllMusic	4/5 stars

Obedience thru Suffering is the debut studio album by the American sludge metal band Crowbar, released in 1991 as their only release with death metal-oriented label Grind Core International. Despite being the first release the band put out after settling down on the name "Crowbar" (as they went through numerous name changes, most notably "The Slugs"), vocalist and guitarist Kirk Windstein stated in a video made with Metal Injection that he and the other bandmates considered the record more as a demo album, also being the reason as why their more notable second studio album is a self-titled release. Some of the tracks from the album are re-recorded versions of songs the band released in demos when they were still called "The Slugs", including "Subversion", for which was made a music video.

== Track listing ==
No.	Title	Length
1.	"Waiting in Silence"	4:27
2.	"I Despise"	4:18
3.	"A Breed Apart"	5:34
4.	"Obedience Thru Suffering"	5:00
5.	"Vacuum"	4:18
6.	"4 Walls"	4:41
7.	"Subversion"	3:09
8.	"Feeding Fear"	3:37
9.	"My Agony"	4:21
10.	"The Innocent"	3:46

1995 reissue bonus tracks
No.	Title	Length
11.	"Fixation" (Live)	4:07
12.	"4 Walls" (Live)	4:06

== Music videos ==
- "Subversion"

== Personnel ==
- Kirk Windstein – vocals, guitar
- Kevin Noonan – guitar
- Todd Strange – bass
- Craig Nunenmacher – drums
