= Lifesblood for the Downtrodden =

Studio album by Crowbar
- Released: February 8, 2005
- Recorded: 2004
- Studio: Noizelab (New Orleans); Piety Studios (New Orleans); Middle Ear Studios (Miami) (track 11)
- Genre: Sludge metal
- Length: 49:59
- Label: Candlelight
- Producer: Warren Riker, Rex Brown

Crowbar chronology
Sonic Excess in Its Purest Form (2001)	Lifesblood for the Downtrodden (2005)	Sever the Wicked Hand (2011)

Professional ratings
Review scores
Source	Rating
AllMusic	3.5/5 stars
Blabbermouth.net	8/10 stars
BW&BK	8/10 stars
Sputnikmusic	4/5 stars
Sea of Tranquility	4/5 stars

Lifesblood for the Downtrodden is the eighth studio album by American sludge metal band Crowbar, released on February 8, 2005 through Candlelight Records. Its working title in 2004 had been You Don't Need an Enemy to Have a War. It is dedicated to the memory of guitarist Dimebag Darrell, who died after the band had recorded the album. The song "Coming Down" appeared on Fear Candy 13, a compilation CD issued by British extreme metal magazine Terrorizer.

== Track listing ==
No.	Title	Length
1.	"New Dawn"	3:59
2.	"Slave No More"	4:28
3.	"Angel's Wings"	2:54
4.	"Coming Down"	5:19
5.	"Fall Back to Zero"	6:26
6.	"Underworld"	2:59
7.	"Dead Sun"	3:39
8.	"Holding Something"	4:08
9.	"Moon"	3:48
10.	"The Violent Reaction"	4:58
11.	"Lifesblood"	7:16
Total length:		49:59

== Music videos ==
- "Dead Sun" (filmed in Miami, Florida, around August 2004 and directed by John-Martin Vogel and Robert Lisman)
- "Slave No More" (filmed in Miami, Florida, on June 21, 2005 and directed by John-Martin Vogel)

== Personnel ==
Crowbar

- Kirk Windstein – vocals, guitar
- Steve Gibb – electric and slide guitar on "Lifesblood"
- Rex Brown – bass, acoustic guitar, keyboards
- Craig Nunenmacher – drums

Additional musicians

- Sid Montz – piano on "Lifesblood"

Production

- Rex Brown – producer
- Warren Riker – producer, engineering, mixing
- Scott "Ish" Campbell – engineering, mixing (track 11)
- Brett "Cosmo" Thorngren – mastering
