= Stillborn (song) =

Single by Black Label Society featuring Ozzy Osbourne

from the album The Blessed Hellride
- Released: April 22, 2003
- Genre: Heavy metal
- Length: 3:15
- Label: Spitfire
- Songwriter: Zakk Wylde
- Producer: Zakk Wylde

"Stillborn" is a song by American heavy metal band Black Label Society from the album The Blessed Hellride. It was also released as a single. Zakk Wylde's own vocal style also became quite similar to Ozzy Osbourne's for this record, while Osbourne was featured in the song on chorus singing with Wylde the lines, "The feelings I once felt are now Dead and gone. I've waited here for you for so very long."

"Stillborn" tells the story of a man whose girlfriend treats him so poorly and takes so much advantage of him that his love for her dies, leaving him feeling dead as well. Wylde insists that it is not autobiographical and that if any girl were to treat him like that, he would simply break up with her.

The music video was directed by Rob Zombie, featuring his signature style of blue lighting, zombies, and a regular female cameo, Rob Zombie's wife Sheri Moon Zombie. The idea came together while touring together on Ozzfest.

Wylde has performed an acoustic version of "Stillborn" that is not only longer but also features a much different sound, following an acoustic solo throughout much of song.

"Stillborn" appears in the 2008 video game Guitar Hero World Tour, with the singer as Zakk Wylde. It is the encore in the guitar career after defeating Wylde in a guitar duel.

== Certifications ==
| Region | Certification | Certified units/sales |
|---|---|---|
| Canada (Music Canada) | Gold | 40,000^{‡} |
^{‡} Sales+streaming figures based on certification alone.
