= Sever the Wicked Hand =

Studio album by Crowbar
- Released: February 8, 2011
- Recorded: 2010
- Studio: OCD Recording and Production (Metairie, Louisiana)
- Genre: Sludge metal
- Length: 52:12
- Label: E1/Housecore/Century Media
- Producer: Kirk Windstein

Crowbar chronology
| Lifesblood for the Downtrodden (2005) | Sever the Wicked Hand (2011) | Symmetry in Black (2014) |

Sever the Wicked Hand is the ninth studio album by American sludge metal band Crowbar. It was released on February 8, 2011 through E1 Music, on February 14, 2011 through Century Media in the UK, and a day later for the rest of Europe. It was the band's first studio album after Lifesblood for the Downtrodden, released exactly six years before in 2005.

== Background ==
Sever the Wicked Hand was the first album that frontman Kirk Windstein recorded sober.

== Critical reception ==
Professional ratings
Aggregate scores
| Source | Rating |
|---|---|
| Metacritic | 79/100 |
Review scores
| Source | Rating |
| AllMusic | 3.5/5 stars |
| Popmatters | 7/10 |
| Rocksound | 8/10 |

According to Metacritic, the album received "generally favorable" reviews and a score of 79. Writing for Popmatters, Adrien Begrand praised Crowbar for ensuring that its ninth album "sound so fresh while sounding so comfortably familiar at the same time", and gave particular accolades to Kirk Windstein's vocals on "Let Me Mourn", the emotional intensity of "Echo an Eternity", and the soulful closing track, "Symbiosis". Situating the album in the context of Windstein's recent recovery from alcoholism, Eduardo Rivadavia wrote for AllMusic that, while there are "no great revelations or revolutions" on Sever the Wicked Hand, Windstein's "spirit and inspiration have clearly been revitalized, and the end results amount to a quintessential Crowbar album" among the strongest of the band's career.

== Track listing ==
| No. | Title | Writer(s) | Length |
|---|---|---|---|
| 1. | "Isolation (Desperation)" | Kirk Windstein | 4:15 |
| 2. | "Sever the Wicked Hand" | Windstein | 3:16 |
| 3. | "Liquid Sky and Cold Black Earth" | Windstein | 6:24 |
| 4. | "Let Me Mourn" | Crowbar | 4:51 |
| 5. | "The Cemetery Angels" | Crowbar | 4:02 |
| 6. | "As I Become One" | Crowbar | 4:56 |
| 7. | "A Farewell to Misery" | Crowbar | 3:44 |
| 8. | "Protectors of the Shrine" | Crowbar | 3:29 |
| 9. | "I Only Deal in Truth" | Crowbar | 3:20 |
| 10. | "Echo an Eternity" | Crowbar | 5:03 |
| 11. | "Cleanse Me, Heal Me" | Crowbar | 3:42 |
| 12. | "Symbiosis" | Crowbar | 5:05 |
| Total length: | | | 52:12 |

== Personnel ==
- Kirk Windstein – vocals, rhythm guitar
- Matt Brunson – lead guitar
- Pat Bruders – bass
- Tommy Buckley – drums

=== Guest musicians ===
- Patrick Plata – vocals on "A Farewell to Misery"
- Duane Simoneaux – piano on "A Farewell to Misery"

=== Production ===
- Kirk Windstein – production
- Zeuss – mixing and mastering
- Duane Simoneaux – engineering
- Thomas De Ville – engineering
- Mike D'Antonio – art
