= Broken Glass (album) =

Studio album by Crowbar
- Released: October 29, 1996
- Recorded: 1996 in New Orleans, Louisiana
- Genre: Sludge metal
- Length: 38:15
- Label: Pavement Music
- Producer: Simon Efemy

Crowbar chronology
Time Heals Nothing (1995)	Broken Glass (1996)	Odd Fellows Rest (1998)

Professional ratings
Review scores
Source	Rating
AllMusic	link

Broken Glass is the fourth studio album by American sludge metal band Crowbar, released on October 29, 1996 through Pavement Music.

== Track listing ==
No.	Title	Length
1.	"Conquering"	2:48
2.	"Like Broken Glass"	3:43
3.	"(Can't) Turn Away from Dying"	5:00
4.	"Wrath of Time Be Judgement"	3:32
5.	"Nothing More"	5:29
6.	"Burn Your World"	2:44
7.	"I Am Forever"	4:17
8.	"Above, Below and Inbetween"	3:00
9.	"You Know (I'll Live Again)"	3:08
10.	"Reborn Thru Me"	4:30

== Music videos ==
- "Like Broken Glass"

== Credits ==
Crowbar

- Kirk Windstein – vocals, guitar
- Matt Thomas – guitar
- Todd Strange – bass
- Jimmy Bower – drums

Additional personnel

- Phil Anselmo – additional vocals
