= Alcohol Fueled Brewtality =

2001 live album by Black Label Society

Alcohol Fueled Brewtality Live!! +5

Live album with studio tracks by Black Label Society
- Released: January 16, 2001
- Recorded: October 28, 2000
- Venue: The Troubadour, Los Angeles
- Genre: Heavy metal; southern metal; groove metal; hard rock
- Length: 91:46
- Label: Spitfire
- Producer: Zakk Wylde

Black Label Society chronology
Stronger Than Death (2000)	Alcohol Fueled Brewtality Live!! +5 (2001)	1919 Eternal (2002)

Professional ratings
Review scores
Source	Rating
AllMusic	3/5 stars
Chronicles of Chaos	8/10

Alcohol Fueled Brewtality Live!! +5 is the first live album by American heavy metal band Black Label Society. It was recorded on October 28, 2000, at The Troubadour in West Hollywood. Disc 2 consists of five new studio tracks. This is the first release by the band that features drummer Craig Nunenmacher.

On June 18, 2001, the album was performed by Zakk Wylde at Ozzfest.

== Track listing ==
All tracks are written by Zakk Wylde, except where noted.

Disc one
No.	Title	Length
1.	"Low Down"	5:23
2.	"13 Years of Grief"	4:08
3.	"Stronger Than Death"	5:02
4.	"All for You"	3:56
5.	"Superterrorizer"	5:19
6.	"Phoney Smiles & Fake Hellos"	4:33
7.	"Lost My Better Half"	4:44
8.	"Bored to Tears"	4:07
9.	"A.N.D.R.O.T.A.Z."	4:26
10.	"Born to Booze"	4:42
11.	"World of Trouble"	5:59
12.	"No More Tears" (Ozzy Osbourne, Wylde, Randy Castillo, Mike Inez, John Purdell)	9:14
13.	"The Beginning... at Last"	6:05

Disc two
No.	Title	Length
1.	"Heart of Gold" (Neil Young)	3:14
2.	"Snowblind" (Ozzy Osbourne, Tony Iommi, Geezer Butler, Bill Ward)	6:59
3.	"Like a Bird"	4:36
4.	"Blood in the Well" (misprinted as "Blood in the Wall" on the back cover)	4:44
5.	"The Beginning... at Last" (acoustic version)	4:31

== Personnel ==
Black Label Society

- Zakk Wylde – vocals, guitar; bass and piano on disc 2
- Nick Catanese – guitar (disc 1 only)
- Steve Gibb – bass (disc 1 only)
- Craig Nunenmacher – drums

Production

- Produced by Zakk Wylde and Eddie Mapp
- Engineered by Eddie Mapp
- Mixed by Zakk Wylde and Eddie Mapp, except "Heart of Gold" and "Snowblind", mixed by Zakk Wylde and Sam Storey
- Mastered by Ron Boustead
