= The Serpent Only Lies =

Studio album by Crowbar
- Released: October 28, 2016
- Genre: Sludge metal
- Length: 45:16
- Label: eOne
- Producer: Kirk Windstein, Duane Simoneaux

Crowbar chronology
Symmetry in Black (2014)	The Serpent Only Lies (2016)	Zero and Below (2022)

Professional ratings
Review scores
Source	Rating
Metal Injection	7.5/10
PunkNews	4/5 stars
Terrorizer	8.5/10

The Serpent Only Lies is the eleventh studio album by the American sludge metal band Crowbar. It was released on October 28, 2016, through eOne Music.

== Track listing ==
No.	Title	Length
1.	"Falling While Rising"	5:38
2.	"Plasmic and Pure"	5:40
3.	"I Am the Storm"	2:57
4.	"Surviving the Abyss"	4:54
5.	"The Serpent Only Lies"	4:35
6.	"The Enemy Beside You"	4:43
7.	"Embrace the Light"	4:23
8.	"On Holy Ground"	4:34
9.	"Song of the Dunes"	3:48
10.	"As I Heal"	4:04

== Personnel ==
=== Crowbar ===
- Kirk Windstein – vocals, guitar
- Todd Strange – bass
- Matt Brunson – guitar
- Tommy Buckley – drums

=== Technical personnel ===
- Kirk Windstein – production
- Duane Simoneaux – production, mixing
