= Beavis and Butt-Head: The Mike Judge Collection =

Episodes handpicked by series creator

DVD box set cover

Beavis and Butt-Head: The Mike Judge Collection is a series of three DVD box sets from MTV and Paramount Home Entertainment, each containing 40 Beavis and Butt-Head episodes chosen by series creator Mike Judge and special features such as interviews and music videos. The first entry in the series was released on November 8, 2005, while the final two volumes were released in 2006.

In 2007, a complete set of all three DVDs was released, which included the content from all three volumes as well as the film Beavis and Butt-Head Do America. In 2012, the set was reissued as a single DVD.

The Mike Judge Collection was also released in three volumes in UMD format for the PlayStation Portable. Due to the limited space of UMDs, the special features were removed and the number of episodes in each volume was reduced.

On February 14, 2017, MTV and Paramount released Beavis and Butt-Head: The Complete Collection, a 12-disc set containing all three previously released volumes of The Mike Judge Collection, along with a special collector's edition of Beavis and Butt-Head Do America.

== Beavis and Butt-Head's return to DVD ==
In July 2005, reports began circulating on various websites that a banner found at that year's Comic-Con proclaimed that a new Beavis and Butt-Head DVD was coming. The news was promptly divulged by TVShowsOnDVD.com: a new Beavis and Butt-Head DVD would be released on November 8, 2005. The set was revealed to contain 40 episodes, including the director's cuts of certain episodes and some of the music video segments. Subsequent new reports revealed that 23 of the episodes would be director's cuts, 11 music videos would be on the set, and the set would contain promos, interviews, and the first part of a new interview entitled "Taint of Greatness: The Journey of Beavis and Butt-Head".

== Music videos ==
Beavis and Butt-Head: The Mike Judge Collection is notable in that it is one of the few times that a home video release of the show has retained music video segments. All prior VHS and DVD releases have lacked these segments except for the VHS releases of Beavis and Butt-Head Do Christmas, Hard Cash, and Too Dumb for T.V., and the last disc of the second and last Time-Life set, presumably due to the difficulty involved in acquiring music rights for the videos. This last disc, entitled Hard Cash, appeared to have made room for four music videos since it contained half the episodes (one VHS worth) of most of the other volumes (typically the combination of content formerly occupying two VHS tapes).

== Director's Cut ==
Some of the episodes on The Mike Judge Collection were changed and edited from the original. Those changes include both "Scene Cuts" and "Line Edits."

=== Volume 1 ===
- "No Laughing": Some of the duo's singing after they're told that they're suspended has been cut. The scene where the duo contemplates their punishment in the bathroom has been cut. The "Insect Court" (carbon copy from "Lawn and Garden") has been cut. Some of the dialogue being yelled at to Butt-Head at the end by the teacher of sex education has been cut.
- "Home Improvement": The scene with Beavis and Butt-Head watching TV at the beginning has been cut. The line "Check it out Butt-Head, paint thinner" (along with its disclaimer) has been edited to "Check it out, Butt-Head". The ending scene with them stuck in traffic on the lawnmower was cut. Though the paint thinner and the painting of the cat were added back in.
- "Lawn and Garden": Butt-Head's line "Welcome to the jungle baby, you're going to die" has been cut.
- "The Crush": The first line from the reporter was cut out which was "And it now appears that the explosion not only killed everyone inside the building." And a few other lines from the other reporters at the beginning. When they are eating nachos the scene where you see a cockroach go into Beavis's nachos and he eats the cockroach was cut. Also when they are rocking out at the end is cut.
- "Plate Frisbee": They cut out some of the scenes where the construction worker is hammering. As they show both of the 18-wheelers they cut out where they show the two guys driving them. Also, they cut out the 18-wheeler driver who's driving the Strike Anywhere Matches line "Huh, Looks like I'm going to crash... Yep."
- "Patients Patients": In the last scene the line "What, Try talking out of your mouth instead of your butt" was edited to "What."
- "Blackout": The first lines from the firefighter women on TV were cut "Tell the commissioner we need that helicopter. I don't care what it costs. No, I'm not chipping in!" And then right after Beavis's line "This sucks" is also cut.
- "Rabies Scare": When they go to the hospital the front desk lady's line, "Can I help you" is cut out.
- "1-900-BEAVIS": The lines, "She said something", "Hey Beavis, I think I just inoculated", "Hey, maybe we'll hear some butt wind" and "That would be cool" have been cut.
- "Madame Blavatsky": Beavis and Butt-Head's fighting scene at the end is cut short, also Madam Blavatsky's line, when she says "The end of the world" has been edited.
- "Late Night With Butt-Head": First minute and a half of this episode have been removed, instead it starts with Beavis and Butt-Head pitching the idea for their talk show. Letterman's cameo voice appearance has been removed. Also, Beavis and Butt-Head celebrating with an air guitar chant after successfully pitching their show have been removed. These scenes are still intact on the out-of-print Time-Life DVDs, and on the Paramount+ version of the episode.
- "Pool Toys": When they are on the tractor they cut out them doing their air guitar chant.
- "Right On": A scene where Beavis and Butt-Head are doing their air guitar chant after they found out they will be on the Gus Baker show has been removed. Also, at the very end, Butt-Head's line "It wouldn't hurt to wipe once in while" has been cut.
- "Date Bait": The scene where Beavis and Butt-Head are on the couch with a cold and Butt-Head doing the "Handbanging-Sneeze" (also showing the Metal sign) has been removed.
- "Butt Is It Art?": As they finished putting bigger boobs on Dolly they cut out the guard next to the painting picking his nose and wiping his finger on the painting. Also when they are trying to steal the painting they cut out the guard in the background until he comes up and stops Beavis.
- "Figure Drawing": Teachers' comment about teaching a class on Aroma Therapy is removed. Three or four lines have also then been cut after Beavis and Butt-Head rearrange the letters on the sign. Several other dialogue cuts were made throughout. These edits are corrected on the out-of-print Time-Life DVDs.
- "Mr. Anderson's Balls": When they are selling the golf balls, Beavis' line "And they fit right in the hole" is cut out.
- "Teen Talk": The scene where Beavis and Butt-Head do their air guitar chant after Lolita and Tanqueray ask if they want to make out behind the risers has been removed.
- "Manners Suck": The ending where Beavis and Butt-Head are in the stalls politely pooping is removed, although it can be found as an Easter egg on the first DVD.
- "The Pipe of Doom": The police officer's line "Freeze, you punk guys!" has been shortened to "Freeze, you punks!" They also cut when Butt-Head tells Beavis "Figure out how to get me out of this pipe." Beavis picks his nose while he's thinking, but they change it where he is just standing there.
- "Beavis and Butt-Head vs. The Vending Machine": One of the commercials near the end when Butt-Head is eating the nachos is cut out "I couldn't understand it Chuck he said he would be right back, but he just left me standing by the vending machine."
- "Held Back": In the scene where Beavis and Butt-Head are in 3rd grade and won't fit in the chairs, the lines "This desk is giving me a stiffy" and "I don't even have room for a stiffy" have been removed.
- "Choke": When Beavis is speaking to the 911 operator the line "Ummm is this like one of those 976 numbers? Ummm what are you wearing?" is cut.
- "Safe House": A scene with Beavis, Butt-Head, and Todd watching a funny "World of Bikini Sports" segment has been removed, when the bikini girl tells the sports anchor to take his hands off her ass.
- "Tainted Meat": Middle section of the news broadcast talking about "a fierce new parasite" has been removed, although it can be found as an Easter egg on the 2nd DVD.
- "Dream On": The duo sings and makes up their own Brady Bunch theme song lyrics.
- "Beverly Buttbillies": Once they dig up the oil there are a few lines that have been removed.

=== Volume 2 ===
- "Bungholio: Lord of the Harvest": The scene where Beavis shows Butt-Head his "Wussy" (Stewart) costume and sings a line of Winger's "Seventeen" before being slapped by Butt-Head was removed. However, this was due to a threat of a lawsuit, instead of the director removing it at his will.

=== Volume 3 ===
- "Head Lice": When Butt-Head is thinking of a way to get rid of the lice they cut out Butt-Head's thinking bubble that has a bug zapper in it and then a fly going into it and getting zapped. Then his bubble disappears and where the bug zapper was in his bubble is there now.
- "Ding-Dong-Ditch": When they are hiding behind the tree in the second house they cut out "Two Hours Later", but leave "One Hour Later".
- "Huh-Huh-Humbug": The song Beavis sings when he arrives home has been changed from "Jingle Bells" to "Winter Wonderland".
- "Wood Shop": The scene where Beavis and Butt-Head cut the teacher's chair into pieces on the saw, then Beavis and Butt-Head are trying to lift the table and the teacher yells "Hey what the hell are you doing?!, I'm going to kill you two idiots!" was removed and edited to only show Butt-Head trying to lift the table and the teacher yelling "Hey, what the hell are you doing?!"
- "Impotence": The line "Help me, I have impotence" has been removed.

== DVDs ==
=== Volume 1 ===
Volume 1 of Beavis and Butt-Head: The Mike Judge Collection was released on November 8, 2005, and contains the following 40 episodes (Director's Cuts are noted with an "*" asterisk):

==== Volume 1, Disc 1 ====
1. "No Laughing" *
2. "Home Improvement" *
3. "Lawn and Garden" *
4. "Washing the Dog"
5. "The Crush" *
6. "Plate Frisbee" *
7. "Most Wanted"
8. "They're Coming to Take Me Away, Huh Huh"
9. "Patients Patients" *
10. "Blackout!" *
11. "Rabies Scare" *
12. "1-900-BEAVIS" *
13. "Madame Blavatsky" *
14. "Late Night with Butt-Head" *
15. "Pool Toys" *
16. "The Final Judgment of Beavis"
17. "Right On" *
18. "Date Bait" *
19. "Butt Is It Art?" *
20. "Figure Drawing" *

==== Volume 1, Disc 2 ====
1. "Mr. Anderson's Balls" *edited
2. "Teen Talk" *edited
3. "Manners Suck" *edited
4. "The Pipe of Doom" *edited
5. "Safe Driving"
6. "Liar! Liar!"
7. "Generation in Crisis"
8. "Beavis and Butt-Head vs. the Vending Machine" *edited
9. "Radio Sweethearts"
10. "The Great Cornholio"
11. "Held Back" *edited
12. "Choke" *edited
13. "Killing Time"
14. "Safe House" *edited
15. "Dude, a Reward"
16. "Walkathon"
17. "Temporary Insanity"
18. "Tainted Meat" *edited
19. "Dream On" *edited
20. "Beaverly Buttbillies" *edited

==== Volume 1, Disc 3 ====
1. Music videos:
  1. Matthew Sweet: "Superdeformed"
  2. Pantera: "This Love"
  3. Moist: "Push"
  4. Deus: "Suds & Soda"
  5. Grim Reaper: "Fear No Evil"
  6. Monster Magnet: "Negasonic Teenage Warhead"
  7. Korn: "Blind"
  8. Catherine Wheel: "Way Down"
  9. Beastie Boys: "Pass the Mic"
  10. Wilco: "Box Full of Letters"
  11. Hum: "Stars"
2. Taint of Greatness: The Journey of Beavis and Butt-Head Part 1
3. Special appearances:
  1. 1994 Video Music Awards
  2. 1994 Video Music Awards with David Letterman
  3. 1996 Video Music Awards
  4. Beavis and Butt-Head Thanksgiving Special with Kurt Loder
4. Promos
  1. Clinton Promo
  2. Waco Promo
  3. Dumb Fun in the Sun Promo
5. Montages
  1. Greatest Hits
  2. Terms of Endearment

=== Volume 2 ===
Volume 2 of Beavis and Butt-Head: The Mike Judge Collection was released on June 13, 2006 (moved up from the original June 6, 2006 date). The set contains 40 episodes (including 17 new-to-DVD), 13 music videos, Part II of "Taint of Greatness: The Journey of Beavis and Butt-Head", previously unaired segments, and other features.

==== Volume 2, Disc 1 ====
1. "Plastic Surgin'"
2. "Stewart Moves Away"
3. "Top o' the Mountain"
4. "Bad Dog"
5. "Lightning Strikes"
6. "Party"
7. "What's the Deal?"
8. "Wet Behind the Rears"
9. "Animation Sucks"
10. "Candy Sale"
11. "Here Comes the Bride's Butt"
12. "Pregnant Pause"
13. "Oil Change"
14. "The History of Women"
15. "Beavis, Can You Spare a Dime?"
16. "Premature Evacuation"
17. "Bang the Drum Slowly Dumbass"
18. "Close Encounters"
19. "Vidiots"
20. "Tired"

==== Volume 2, Disc 2 ====
1. "Whiplash"
2. "Spare Me"
3. "Womyn"
4. "Murder Site"
5. "Another Friday Night"
6. "Patsies"
7. "Spanish Fly"
8. "Sexual Harassment"
9. "Green Thumbs"
10. "Bus Trip"
11. "Blood Pressure"
12. "Feel a Cop"
13. "U.S. History"
14. "Date Watchers"
15. "Gang of Two"
16. "Stewart Is Missing"
17. "Prank Call"
18. "Babysitting"
19. "Buttniks"
20. "Bungholio: Lord of the Harvest" *edited

==== Volume 2, Disc 3 ====
1. Music videos:
  1. Beastie Boys: "Sabotage"
  2. Seaweed: "Kid Candy"
  3. Pantera: "I'm Broken"
  4. Mercyful Fate: "The Bellwitch"
  5. Compulsion: "Delivery"
  6. Madonna: "Secret"
  7. Six Finger Satellite: "Parlor Games"
  8. Pizzicato 5: "Twiggy, Twiggy"
  9. Rush: "Stick It Out"
  10. Radiohead: "Fake Plastic Trees"
  11. Extreme: "Hole Hearted"
  12. Helium: "Pat's Trick"
  13. MC 900 Ft. Jesus: "If I Only Had a Brain"
2. Taint of Greatness: The Journey of Beavis and Butt-Head Part 2
3. Special appearances:
  1. Butt-Bowl '94
  2. Butt-Bowl '95
  3. Butt-Bowl '96
  4. MTV's 20th Anniversary Special
  5. Calvin Klein Ad Parodies
  6. Moron-a-Thon Clips featuring Snoop Dogg
  7. Unaired I Love the '90s Segment
4. Promos:
  1. Premiere Promo
  2. Moron-a-Thon Promo
  3. New Episodes Promo
5. Montages
  1. Memories of Love
  2. Friends and Neighbors

=== Volume 3 ===
Volume 3 of Beavis and Butt-Head: The Mike Judge Collection was released on August 1, 2006. This collection includes 42 episodes, the uncut "Frog Baseball" Beavis and Butt-Head short, 15 music videos (including Soundgarden, Alice Cooper, and Sonic Youth), rare special appearances and promos, and Part III of "Taint of Greatness: The Journey of Beavis and Butt-Head".

==== Volume 3, Disc 1 ====
1. "No Service"
2. "Sprout"
3. "Yard Sale"
4. "P.T.A."
5. "Substitute"
6. "Shopping List"
7. "Buy Beer"
8. "A Very Special Episode"
9. "Just for Girls"
10. "Head Lice" *
11. "Vaya Con Cornholio"
12. "Nose Bleed"
13. "Underwear"
14. "Follow Me"
15. "On Strike"
16. "Take a Lap"
17. "Pierced"
18. "Ding-Dong-Ditch" *Edited
19. "Huh-Huh-Humbug" *Edited
20. "It's a Miserable Life"

==== Volume 3, Disc 2 ====
1. "Citizens' Arrest"
2. "A Great Day"
3. "Dumbasses Anonymous"
4. "Wood Shop" *
5. "Shopping Cart"
6. "Bride of Butt-Head"
7. "Special Delivery"
8. "T.V. Violence"
9. "The Miracle That is Beavis"
10. "Impotence" *
11. "Inventors"
12. "Canned"
13. "Drinking Butt-ies"
14. "Garage Band"
15. "Die Fly, Die!"
16. "Breakdown"
17. "Speech Therapy"
18. "Work Is Death"
19. "Graduation Day"
20. "Butt Flambé"
21. "Leave it to Beavis"
22. "Beavis and Butt-Head Are Dead"

==== Volume 3, Disc 3 ====
1. Music videos:
  1. Stakka Bo: "Here We Go"
  2. Crowbar: "Existence is Punishment"
  3. Salt-N-Pepa (featuring En Vogue): "Whatta Man"
  4. Poison: "I Want Action"
  5. 2 Unlimited: "Get Ready for This"
  6. Tripping Daisy: "I Got a Girl"
  7. The Jesus Lizard: "Glamorous"
  8. Sonic Youth: "Dirty Boots"
  9. Soundgarden: "Spoonman"
  10. Jon Spencer Blues Explosion: "Dang"
  11. PJ Harvey: "Down By the Water"
  12. Alice Cooper: "Teenage Frankenstein"
  13. Toadies: "Possum Kingdom"
  14. Rollins Band: "Liar"
  15. Paul Broucek: "Hollywood Halloween"
2. The uncut pilot episode, "Frog Baseball"
3. Taint of Greatness: The Journey of Beavis and Butt-Head, Part 3
4. Special appearances:
  1. Beavis and Butt-Head Yule Log Clips
  2. Letters to Santa Butt-Head
  3. '97 Press Conference Shorts
  4. Interview with Chris Connelly
  5. 2005 VMAs
5. Promos:
  1. Beavis and Butt-Head Movie Shorts and Promos
  2. Sunday Stew Promos
  3. Holiday Gifts Promo

== Mike Judge's Most Wanted ==
A very simple DVD was released on October 4, 2011. It only includes 20 chapters taken from the volumes, this DVD compared to the volumes does not contain the music videos, includes the 3 parts of "The Taint of Greatness", the original pilot "Frog Baseball" and preview clips from the season 8. Released as a single-disc:

=== Disc content ===
1. "Lightning Strikes"
2. "A Very Special Episode"
3. "Die Fly, Die!"
4. "Stewart is Missing"
5. "Close Encounters"
6. "Nose Bleed"
7. "Plastic Surgin'"
8. "Tired"
9. "Candy Sale"
10. "Date Bait"
11. "Animation Sucks"
12. "Impotence"
13. "Beaverly Buttbillies"
14. "Sexual Harassment"
15. "Prank Call"
16. "Substitute"
17. "Follow Me"
18. "Bus Trip"
19. "Safe House"
20. "The Great Cornholio"
21. Special Features:
  1. The uncut pilot episode, "Frog Baseball"
  2. Taint of Greatness: The Journey of Beavis and Butt-Head
  3. Preview clips from Season 8

== Volume 4 ==
Although not labeled as a Mike Judge Collection, Mike Judge's Beavis and Butt-Head Volume 4 was released on February 14, 2012, containing all 12 episodes from the show's 8th season completely uncut with all music videos and reality show clips left intact, the 2011 San Diego Comic-Con Panel with Mike Judge and Johnny Knoxville, Beavis & Butt-Head Interruptions, and more. Released as a 2-disc DVD and a single-disc Blu-ray.

=== DVD, Disc 1 ===
1. "Werewolves of Highland" / "Crying"
2. "Daughter's Hand" / "Tech Support"
3. "Holy Cornholio"
4. "Drones"
5. "Supersize Me" / "Bathroom Break"
6. "The Rat" / "Spill"

=== DVD, Disc 2 ===
1. "Doomsday" / "Dumb Design"
2. "Copy Machine" / "Holding"
3. "Used Car" / "Bounty Hunters"
4. "Time Machine" / "Massage"
5. "School Test" / "Snitchers"
6. "Whorehouse" / "Going Down"
7. Special Features:
  1. 2011 San Diego Comic-Con Panel
  2. Beavis & Butt-Head Interruptions
  3. Silence Your Cell Phone

=== Blu-ray ===
1. "Werewolves of Highland" / "Crying"
2. "Daughter's Hand" / "Tech Support"
3. "Holy Cornholio"
4. "Drones"
5. "Supersize Me" / "Bathroom Break"
6. "The Rat" / "Spill"
7. "Doomsday" / "Dumb Design"
8. "Copy Machine" / "Holding"
9. "Used Car" / "Bounty Hunters"
10. "Time Machine" / "Massage"
11. "School Test" / "Snitchers"
12. "Whorehouse" / "Going Down"
13. Special Features:
  1. 2011 San Diego Comic-Con Panel
  2. Beavis & Butt-Head Interruptions
  3. Silence Your Cell Phone

== Unreleased DVDs ==
Two additional DVDs were scrapped, the first one, titled The History of Beavis and Butt-Head, was intended to release in 2002. However, it was cancelled at the last minute due to certain episodes Mike Judge did not approve for home video release. Despite this, some retailers went ahead and put some copies on their shelves before a swift recall. However, certain people did buy it and copies can now be found on online retailers like eBay. It has a few bonus features such as four retrospective montages, a promo collection and scenes from "Do Thanksgiving with Kurt Loder."

The other DVD, titled Season One and Original Movie, features the ninth season of the show (commonly known as the second revival of the series) and its movie Beavis and Butt-Head Do the Universe. It was planned to be released on March 14, 2023, but was later scrapped without explanation. It is currently unknown what the special features would have been.
