= Stronger Than Death =

Studio album by Black Label Society
- Released: April 18, 2000
- Recorded: 1999–2000
- Genre: Heavy metal; southern metal; groove metal; hard rock
- Length: 50:54
- Label: Spitfire
- Producer: Zakk Wylde

Black Label Society chronology
Sonic Brew (1998)	Stronger Than Death (2000)	Alcohol Fueled Brewtality (2001)

Professional ratings
Review scores
Source	Rating
AllMusic	3.5/5 stars
The Encyclopedia of Popular Music	3/5 stars
Kerrang!	4/5 stars
Rock Hard	6.5/10

Stronger Than Death is the second studio album by American heavy metal band Black Label Society. It was initially released in Japan on March 7, 2000, with 11 tracks and in a blood red jewel case. It was released outside Japan almost a month and a half later with only 10 tracks and in clear jewel case.

The music video for "Counterfeit God" features actor Mark Wahlberg as the band's stand-in bassist.

== Track listing ==
All tracks are written by Zakk Wylde.

No.	Title	Length
1.	"All for You"	3:59
2.	"Phoney Smiles & Fake Hellos"	4:16
3.	"13 Years of Grief"	4:11
4.	"Rust"	6:08
5.	"Superterrorizer"	5:33
6.	"Counterfeit God"	4:18
7.	"Ain't Life Grand"	4:39
8.	"Just Killing Time"	4:55
9.	"Stronger Than Death"	4:52
10.	"Love Reign Down"	8:03
Total length:		50:54

Japanese edition bonus track
No.	Title	Length
11.	"Bullet Inside Your Head"	4:54
Total length:		55:48

== Personnel ==
Black Label Society

- Zakk Wylde – guitars, vocals, bass, piano
- Phil Ondich (credited as "Philth") – drums

Additional performance

- Mike Piazza – death growls on "Stronger Than Death"

Production

- Produced by Zakk Wylde
- Engineered by Lee DeCarlo with Sam Storey
- Mixed by Zakk Wylde and Lee DeCarlo, assisted by Rony Brack
- Mastered by Ron Boustead, Lee DeCarlo, Zakk Wylde and Rony Brack
- A&R – Paul Bibeau
- Mogul – Dennis Clapp
- Art concept, design, and layout – Black Label Society
- Art direction – John Buttino
- Illustrations – Philth
- Photography – William Haymes
- Tray photo – Sven Isaakson

== Charts ==
Chart performance for Stronger Than Death
Chart (2000)	Peak position
US Independent Albums (Billboard)	29
