= Time Heals Nothing =

Studio album by Crowbar
- Released: May 23, 1995
- Studio: Ultrasonic (New Orleans)
- Genre: Sludge metal
- Length: 37:08
- Label: Pavement Music
- Producer: Crowbar

Crowbar chronology
Crowbar (1993)	Time Heals Nothing (1995)	Broken Glass (1996)

Professional ratings
Review scores
Source	Rating
AllMusic	3/5 stars
Chronicles of Chaos	7/10
Lollipop Magazine	(positive)
Ox-Fanzine	(positive)
Sea of Tranquility	4.5/5 stars

Time Heals Nothing is the third studio album by American sludge metal band Crowbar, released in 1995 through Pavement Music. It was re-released in 2000 by Spitfire Records with new album artwork, courtesy of Rich DiSilvio.

== Track listing ==
All tracks are written by Crowbar.

No.	Title	Length
1.	"The Only Factor"	3:07
2.	"No More Can We Crawl"	2:52
3.	"Time Heals Nothing"	4:36
4.	"Leave It Behind"	3:21
5.	"Through a Wall of Tears"	6:00
6.	"Lack of Tolerance"	3:09
7.	"Still I Reach"	3:18
8.	"Embracing Emptiness"	3:31
9.	"A Perpetual Need"	3:50
10.	"Numb Sensitive"	3:24
Total length:		37:08

== Personnel ==
=== Crowbar ===
- Kirk Windstein – guitar, vocals
- Matt Thomas – guitar
- Todd Strange – bass
- Craig Nunenmacher – drums

=== Additional personnel ===
- Tito "Bad Boy Bobby Ray" Ralph – vocals on track 5
- David Farrell – engineering
- Bernie Grundman – mastering

== Music videos ==
- "The Only Factor"
