= Kirk Windstein =

American guitarist and vocalist

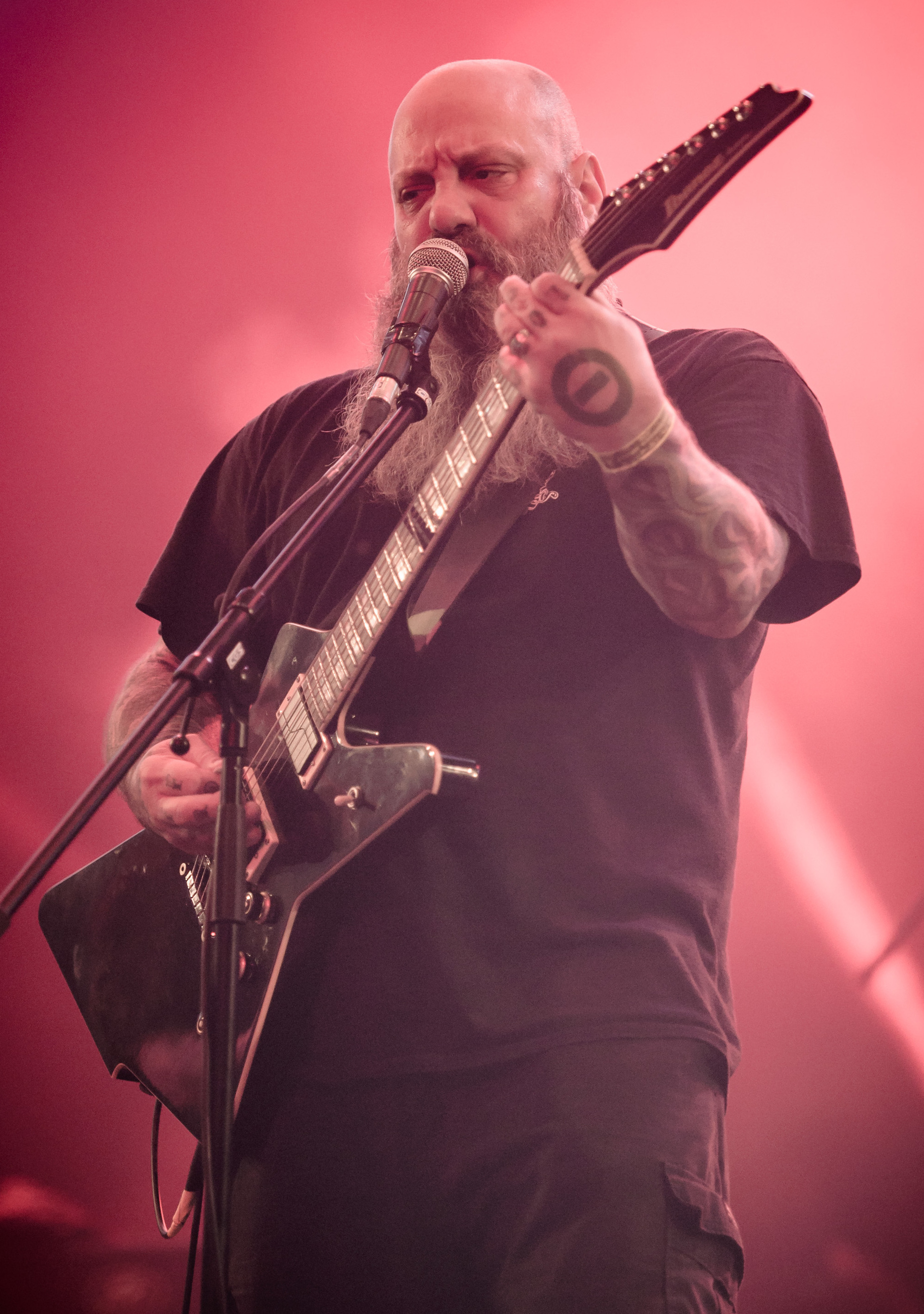
- Windstein performing with Crowbar in 2017

Background information
- Born: Kirk Michael Windstein; April 14, 1965 (age 61); Unknown U.S. Air Force base, England, United Kingdom
- Origin: New Orleans, Louisiana, U.S.
- Genres: Sludge metal, stoner metal, southern metal
- Occupations: Musician, songwriter
- Instruments: Guitar, vocals
- Years active: 1985–present
- Member of: Crowbar, Down, Kingdom of Sorrow, Sun Don't Shine

Kirk Michael Windstein (born April 14, 1965) is an American musician. He is the frontman, vocalist, rhythm guitarist, and sole constant member of the sludge metal band Crowbar. He is also a founding member of the heavy metal supergroup Down, playing guitar with them from 1991 to 2013 and later rejoining the band in 2020. In 2005, Windstein formed Kingdom of Sorrow with Jamey Jasta of Hatebreed. Their debut album was released in 2008. He has also released two solo albums.

Windstein began his musical career in 1985 as a guitarist for a cover band called Victorian Blitz, and in 1988 joined a hardcore punk band called Shell Shock as a vocalist and guitarist.

== Life and career ==
=== Early work ===
Windstein played guitar for the cover band Victorian Blitz in 1985, which performed renditions of songs by WASP and Judas Priest. Other members included Sid Montz (with whom Windstein would play again in Crowbar), Kevin Noonan, and Danny Theriot.

After leaving Victorian Blitz, Windstein joined the New Orleans hardcore punk band Shell Shock as their guitarist and vocalist. With Windstein in the band, they began to play more of a crossover thrash style rather than straightforward hardcore punk, as it better suited Windstein's vocal style and a two-guitarist lineup. The band's sound was described as "wedding the primitive attack of Cro-Mags with the blistering speed of Slayer". After finishing the recording of a new album called No Tomorrow, guitarist Mike Hatch committed suicide. Kevin Noonan replaced him for the final Shell Shock show in 1988, and the band became what is now Crowbar.

=== Crowbar ===
After the collapse of Shell Shock in 1988 due to the suicide of Hatch, the band enlisted Kevin Noonan and carried on as Aftershock, which played a mixture of hardcore punk and doom metal. Under that name, they released a demo in mid-1989, but then renamed themselves Wrequiem when bassist Mike Savoie (who would later direct music videos for Crowbar, Down, and Pantera) left the band and was replaced by Todd Strange.

In 1990, they renamed themselves The Slugs, and after a demo in mid-1990, the band collapsed. Windstein considered becoming the guitarist for Exhorder but he and Strange reformed the band, with Craig Nunenmacher as the drummer and Kevin Noonan on guitar. The band renamed themselves to Crowbar in mid-1991.

Crowbar was originally signed by Mark Nawara to Pavement Music and released their debut album, Obedience thru Suffering, in 1991. Windstein's childhood friend Phil Anselmo (who at the time was with Pantera) produced their next effort, a self-titled album released in 1993. The album went on to achieve international success with songs such as "All I Had (I Gave)", "Existence Is Punishment", and a cover of Led Zeppelin's "No Quarter". MTV's Headbangers Ball began to play the music video for "Existence Is Punishment", which was also featured on Beavis and Butt-Head. Following that success, the band toured with Pantera. Together, they partied heavily, and footage of these events appears on Pantera's third home video and Crowbar's "Like Broken" video, in which Windstein dressed up as Hulk.

In 2001, Crowbar went on hiatus because Windstein concentrated on other bands. Upon Windstein's return, Crowbar released Lifesblood for the Downtrodden in 2005, and two years later released a live DVD called Live: With Full Force. The band went on to release Sever the Wicked Hand in 2011, Symmetry in Black in 2014, The Serpent Only Lies in 2016, and their latest, Zero and Below, in March 2022.

=== Down ===
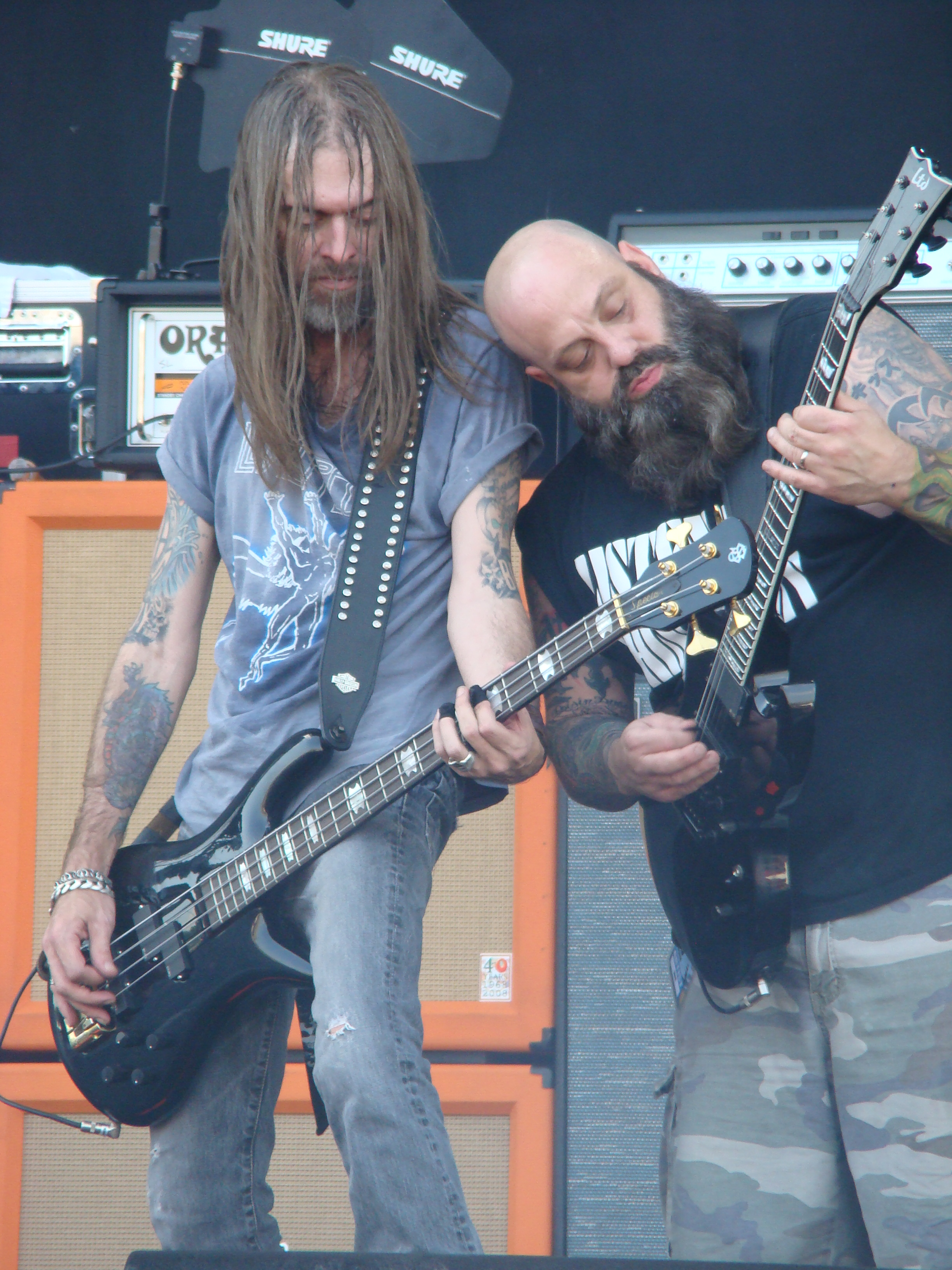
Windstein (right) and Rex Brown performing with Down in 2009

Down released their debut album NOLA via Elektra Records in 1995 with Windstein on guitar and bass, Anselmo on vocals, Pepper Keenan on guitar, and Jimmy Bower (Crowbar, Superjoint Ritual, Eyehategod) on drums. The band played a 13-show tour with Todd Strange on bass, and the album was certified gold by the RIAA. Following the tour, each member returned to their respective bands.

Crowbar recorded three albums before Down reunited to release Down II: A Bustle in Your Hedgerow in 2002. Following its release, Down toured on the second stage at Ozzfest, and then continued to tour on the "An Evening with... Down" tour. Afterward, both Windstein and Keenan returned to their main bands, thereby allowing Windstein to record Crowbar's Lifesblood for the Downtrodden with Rex Brown on bass, Craig Nunenmacher (Black Label Society and original Crowbar member) on drums and Down producer Warren Riker in early 2005.

In 2007, Down released the album Down III: Over the Under. They released an EP titled Down IV – Part I in September 2012. In late 2013, Windstein announced that he is leaving Down to concentrate on Crowbar full-time because of the band's 25th anniversary in 2014. In 2020, he rejoined Down.

=== Kingdom of Sorrow ===
In 2005, Windstein teamed up with vocalist Jamey Jasta of Hatebreed to form a new side venture called Kingdom of Sorrow. The band's self-titled debut album was released on February 19, 2008, through Relapse Records. It debuted at No. 131 on the US Billboard charts and sold 6,000 records in its first week of release. The album was recorded at Planet Z with producer Zeuss, known for his work with Shadows Fall and many others.

=== Solo work ===
In January 2020, Windstein released his first solo album, Dream in Motion, via eOne Music. His second solo album, Ethereal Waves, was released on October 3, 2025, via Jamey Jasta's label Perseverance Media Group.

== Personal life ==
Windstein married Robin Windstein in 2013 and has a daughter from a previous marriage. He is a Christian.

== Equipment ==
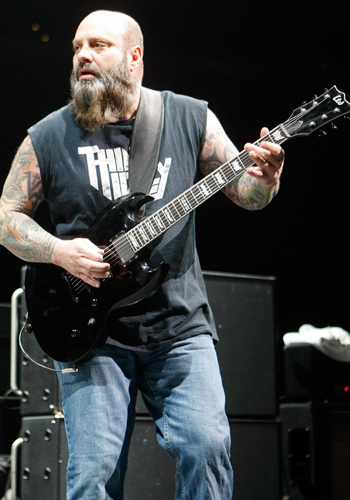
Windstein performing with Down at Download Festival 2009

Windstein has used various guitars in his career, including ESP Guitars, Gibson and Solar. Solar released a Windstein signature model in 2024. Windstein endorsed Orange Amps in 2010 along with Pepper Keenan. In 2007, Windstein's tour rig for Down was described by The Guitar Magazine as based on four Marshall Amplification 1960B 4×12 cabinets loaded with Celestion speakers, all driven by one Marshall JCM800 2203X 100-watt head. For this tour, Windstein played several ESP Viper guitars through a pedalboard containing overdrive, wah pedal, chorus and phaser units made by Boss, Dunlop, MXR and others. His guitars at this time were always tuned 1 1/2 steps down from normal, meaning that his "standard" tuning from low string to high was C♯–F♯–B–E–G♯–C♯, while his "drop B" tuning was B–F♯–B–E–G♯–C♯.

== Discography ==
=== Crowbar ===
Date of release	Title	Label
September 26, 1991	Obedience thru Suffering	Pavement Music
October 12, 1993	Crowbar	Pavement Music
March 29, 1994	Live +1 (EP)	Pavement Music
May 23, 1995	Time Heals Nothing	Pavement Music
October 29, 1996	Broken Glass	Pavement Music
July 7, 1998	Odd Fellows Rest	Pavement Music
March 7, 2000	Equilibrium	Spitfire Records
August 8, 2001	Sonic Excess in Its Purest Form	Spitfire Records
February 9, 2005	Lifesblood for the Downtrodden	Candlelight Records
February 8, 2011	Sever the Wicked Hand	Housecore Records
May 27, 2014	Symmetry in Black	E1 Music
October 28, 2016	The Serpent Only Lies	E1 Music
March 4, 2022	Zero and Below	MNRK Heavy

=== Down ===
Date of US release	Title	Label	US Billboard peak
September 19, 1995	NOLA	Elektra	57
March 26, 2002	Down II: A Bustle in Your Hedgerow	Elektra	44
September 25, 2007	Down III: Over the Under	Roadrunner Records (Europe)	26
September 18, 2012	Down IV – Part I (The Purple EP)	Roadrunner Records (Europe)	35
November 20, 2026	Volume V	Nuclear Blast Records	N/A

=== Kingdom of Sorrow ===
Date of US release	Title	Label	US Billboard peak
February 19, 2008	Kingdom of Sorrow	Relapse Records	131
June 8, 2010	Behind the Blackest Tears	Relapse Records	N/A

=== Solo ===
Date of US release	Title	Label
January 24, 2020	Dream in Motion	eOne Music
October 3, 2025	Ethereal Waves	Perseverance Media Group

== Music videos ==
- 1991: Crowbar – "Subversion"
- 1993: Crowbar – "All I Had (I Gave)"
- 1993: Crowbar – "Existence Is Punishment"
- 1994: Down – "Stone the Crow"
- 1995: Crowbar – "The Only Factor
- 1996: Crowbar – "Broken Glass"
- 1997: Crowbar – "Like Broken" (full-length home video)
- 1997: Pantera – "3 Watch It Go" (full-length home video) (Windstein as The Incredible Hulk)
- 2000: Crowbar – "I Feel the Burning Sun"
- 2002: Down – "Ghosts along the Mississippi"
- 2005: Crowbar – "Dead Sun" (filmed in Miami, Florida, around August 2004 and directed by John-Martin Vogel and Robert Lisman)
- 2005: Crowbar – "Lasting Dose"
- 2005: Crowbar – "Slave No More" (filmed in Miami, Florida, on June 21, 2005, and directed by John-Martin Vogel)
- 2007: Crowbar – "Live: With Full Force" (full-length DVD)
- 2007: Down – "On March the Saints"
- 2008: Kingdom of Sorrow – "Lead into Demise"
- 2008: Kingdom of Sorrow – "Lead the Ghosts Astray"
- 2011: Crowbar – "Cemetery Angels"
- 2012: Down – "Witchtripper"
- 2014: Crowbar – "Walk with Knowledge Wisely"
- 2014: Crowbar – "Symmetry in White"
- 2016: Crowbar – "Falling While Rising"
- 2019: Kirk Windstein – "Dream in Motion"
- 2021: Crowbar – "Chemical Godz"
- 2022: Crowbar – "Bleeding from Every Hole"
- 2023: Sun Don't Shine – "Dreams Always Die with the Sun"
- 2023: Sun Don't Shine – "Cryptomnesia"
- 2025: Sun Don't Shine – "The Promise Song"
- 2025: Sun Don't Shine – "Coming Down"
- 2025: Sun Don't Shine- "In The End"
- 2026: Sun Don't Shine- "Power To Live"
