= Crowbar (American band) =

American sludge metal band

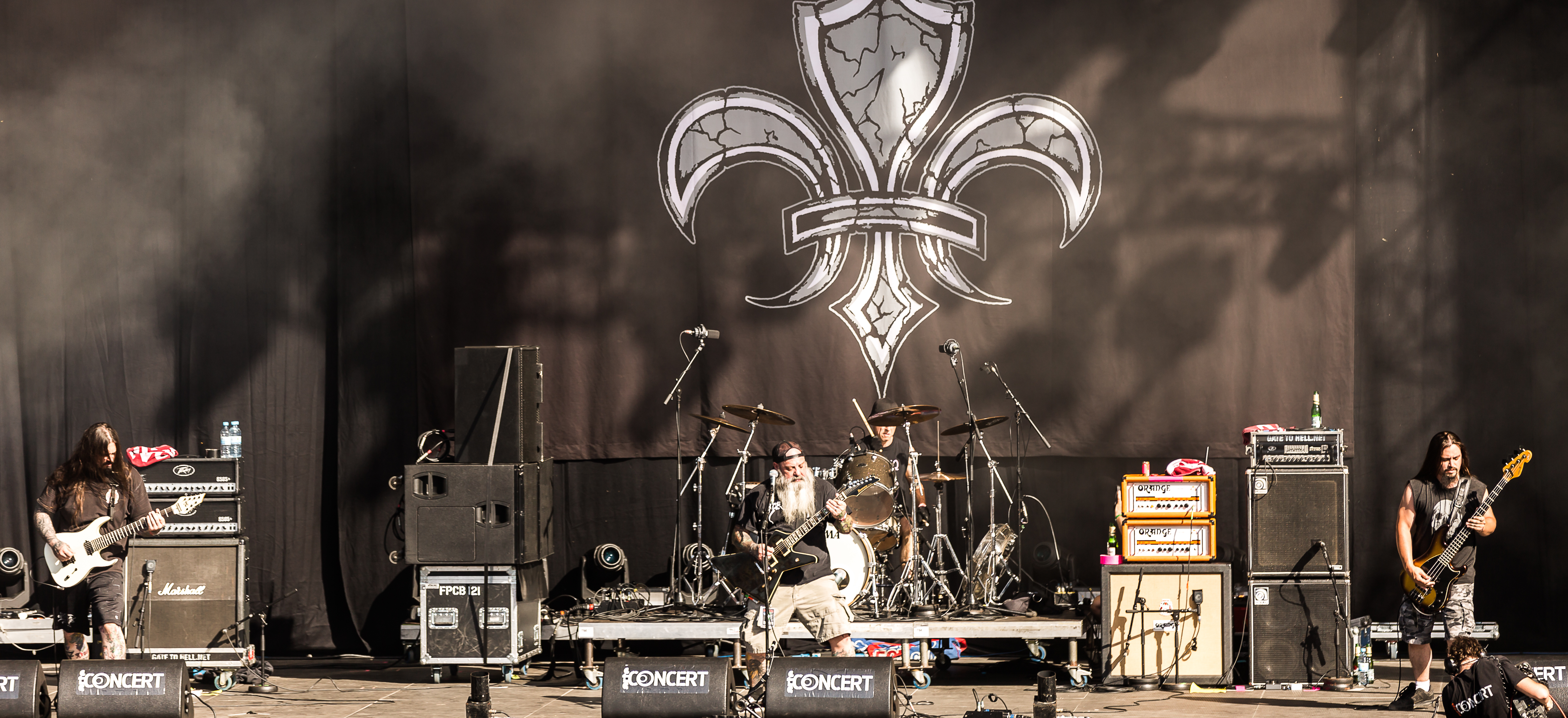
- Crowbar at Full Force 2019

Background information
- Also known as: The Slugs (1990–1991)
- Origin: New Orleans, Louisiana, U.S.
- Genres: Sludge metal; doom metal
- Years active: 1990–present
- Labels: Zoo, E1, Gold Metal, MNRK Heavy, Spinefarm
- Members: Kirk Windstein; Tommy Buckley; Matt Brunson; Pat Bruders
- Past members: Jeff Golden; Craig Nunenmacher; Steve Gibb; Kevin Noonan; Matt Thomas; Jimmy Bower; Sammy Duet; Tony Costanza; Rex Brown; Todd Strange; Shane Wesley
- Website: crowbarnola.com

Crowbar is an American sludge metal band formed in New Orleans, Louisiana in 1990. The band is fronted by vocalist/guitarist Kirk Windstein, Crowbar's sole constant member.

Infusing a slow, brooding doom metal sound with the aggression of hardcore punk, Crowbar along with other bands in the New Orleans heavy metal scene pioneered a style known as sludge metal, though Windstein himself has admitted a dislike for the term. The band has also covered songs from outside of their immediate genre; these include Gary Wright's "Dream Weaver" on Equilibrium, Iron Maiden's "Remember Tomorrow" on Odd Fellows Rest, and Led Zeppelin's "No Quarter" on Crowbar.

== History ==
=== Origins (1988–1991) ===
The band dates back to 1988, when Kirk Windstein joined the New Orleans hardcore punk band ShellShock. He met Jimmy Bower, who was their drummer, and they quickly became friends. The band collapsed when Mike Hatch, their guitarist, committed suicide in late 1988. The band hence replaced Hatch with Kevin Noonan and continued under the new name, Aftershock. Under that name they released a demo in mid-1989 and then renamed themselves again as Wrequiem, with their bassist Mike Savoie leaving the band and Todd Strange replacing him. They renamed themselves yet again in 1990 as The Slugs, and released a demo in mid-1990, but the band collapsed.

Windstein considered becoming the bass player for New Orleans–based groove metal band Exhorder but he and Strange reformed their band, with Craig Nunenmacher as the drummer. Nunenmacher was later replaced by Tommy Buckley from Soilent Green, and Kevin Noonan returned on guitar. The band renamed themselves Crowbar in mid-1991, after their label warned them that another band called "The Slugs" already existed; the name Crowbar was borrowed from one of Windstein's side-projects. Windstein has listed Celtic Frost as one of the band's early influences in terms of sound.

=== Career (1991–present) ===
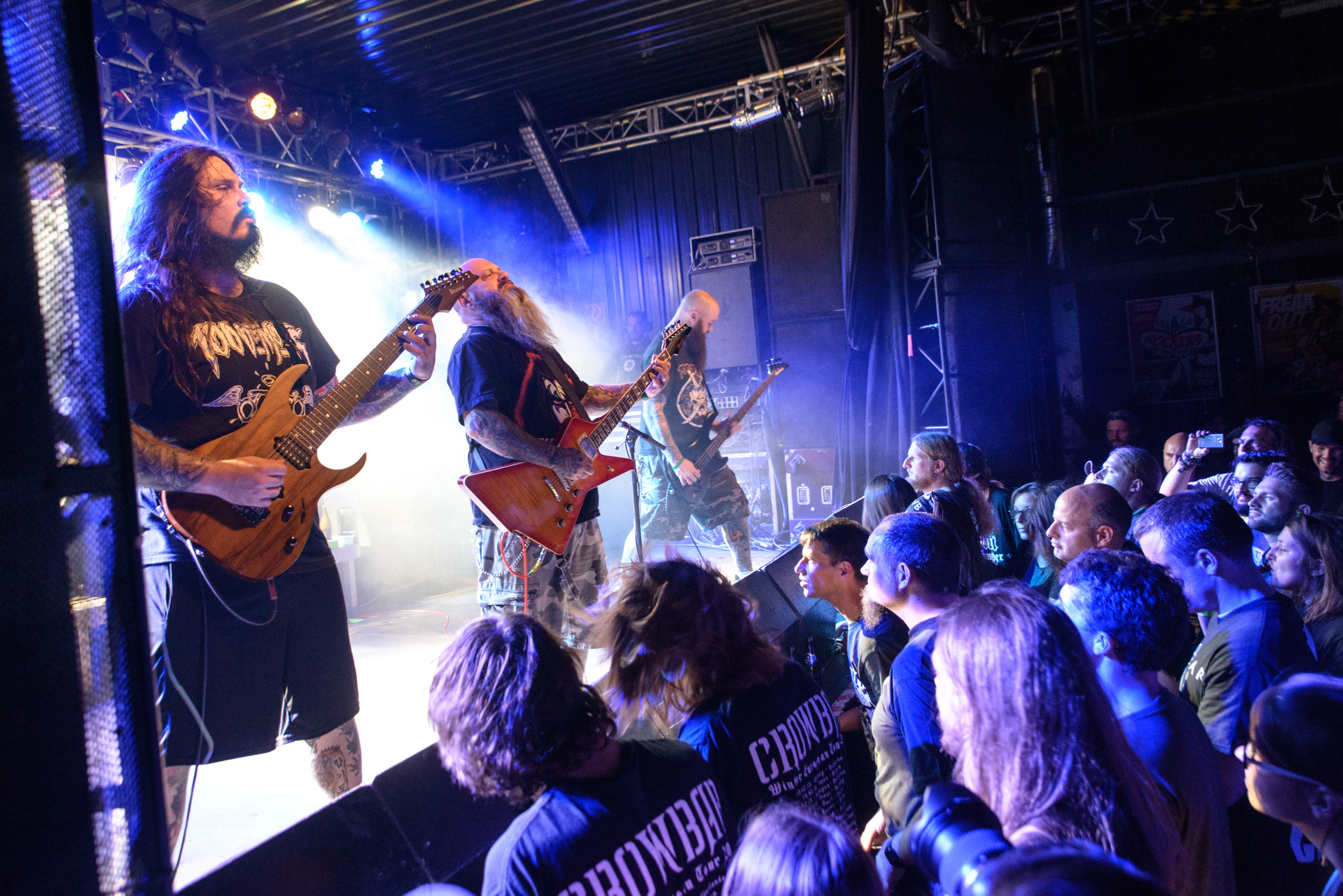
Crowbar performing in 2015

Crowbar's debut studio album, Obedience thru Suffering, was released in 1991, but failed to achieve significant sales or airplay. 1993's self-titled album, produced by personal friend Phil Anselmo (Pantera, Down, and Superjoint Ritual), eventually led to national promotion on MTV's Headbangers Ball. In addition, the videos for "All I Had (I Gave)" and "Existence Is Punishment" were commented on by Beavis and Butt-Head. Following this success, the band went on to record music videos, embark on major tours with Pantera, and record more albums.

Their stage antics, immortalized in Pantera's third home video and Crowbar's Like Broken Glass home video, became infamous. The band continued recording and touring. In 1994, the Pantera video for the song "I'm Broken" showed Anselmo wearing a Crowbar/Eyehategod T-shirt. Original drummer Nunenmacher left the band in 1996 and was replaced by Jimmy Bower from Down and Eyehategod, and for their 1996 release, Anselmo sang backup on a few tracks on Broken Glass.

In 2000, after recording and releasing Equilibrium with Sid Montz on drums, Nunenmacher rejoined the band for the "Penchant for Violence Tour" with "The Brotherhood of Brewtality" Black Label Society and Sixty Watt Shaman. Halfway through the tour, Nunenmacher replaced BLS's drummer Phil Ondich and pulled double duty for the rest of the tour, eventually joining BLS permanently.

The band continues to perform, borrowing members from New Orleans metal bands like Goatwhore and Acid Bath. In their 2005 release, Lifesblood for the Downtrodden, Pantera bassist Rex Brown lent his bass skills and keyboard playing. Down's producer Warren Riker assisted in production. Also in 2005, Beavis and Butt-Head's commentary on "Existence Is Punishment" appeared on the Beavis and Butt-Head: The Mike Judge Collection No. 3 DVD.

The band is also known for covering other bands' material and putting a heavy spin on it. Crowbar covered Gary Wright's "Dream Weaver" on their Equilibrium album, Iron Maiden's "Remember Tomorrow" on Odd Fellows Rest, and Led Zeppelin's "No Quarter" on Crowbar.

On April 21, 2008, the albums Crowbar, Time Heals Nothing, and the Live+1 EP were reissued in Europe with bonus and multimedia tracks. On May 24, 2009, it was announced that Phil Anselmo's Housecore Records would be re-releasing Crowbar's back catalog.

In December 2009, Crowbar toured with Hatebreed, The Acacia Strain, The Casualties, and Thy Will Be Done as part of the Stillborn Fest.

As of September 2010, Crowbar is under contract with E1 Music in North America and Century Media in Europe, and released their ninth studio album, Sever the Wicked Hand, on February 8, 2011. This date is the sixth anniversary of the release of their previous album, Lifesblood for the Downtrodden. The band embarked on a six-date UK tour in January 2011.

Bassist Pat Bruders left Crowbar in September 2013. Bruders explained he wanted to focus on touring with Down. He told Louder than Hell, "It is better for all parties in Crowbar and in Down that I leave Crowbar. With Down's brutal tour schedule and overseas shows. It is better if I focus 100 percent of my time to Down. There are no hard feelings with my bandmates of Crowbar." Bruders was replaced by Jeff Golden, who formerly played with Six Feet Under, Thy Will Be Done, and Goatwhore.

Crowbar entered the studio in late 2013 to begin recording Symmetry in Black, which was released in North America on May 27, 2014, via E1 Music.

In May 2016, bassist Jeff Golden announced on his Facebook page that he had been fired from the band. Shortly after Golden's departure, Windstein announced that founding bassist Todd Strange would return to the band. The band toured with Carcass later that year. In July 2018, Strange had retired from touring although he will remain a member of the band. His final performance was at the Odd Fellows Rest 20th anniversary show on August 4, 2018. Shane Wesley is his live replacement and had already played on Crowbar's summer European tour.

In mid 2017, Crowbar supported Overkill on the annual Metal Alliance tour. In the spring of 2018, Crowbar opened up for Hatebreed on their 20 Years of Desire and 15 Years of Perseverance tours. Crowbar opened up for Killswitch Engage on a short fall tour in November 2018.

Crowbar's twelfth studio album (and their first in six years) Zero and Below was released on March 4, 2022. They toured North America and Europe with Sepultura and Sacred Reich in support of the album, and also toured with Eyehategod in March and April of 2026. After continuing to tour behind Zero and Below for nearly five years, the band plans to work on their next album in 2027, with a tentative release date of later that year or 2028.

== Musical style and influences ==
Crowbar's music has been described as sludge metal. According to Steve Huey of AllMusic, Crowbar "combines the doomy heft of Black Sabbath, the intense riffage of Pantera, and the intricate progressions of Metallica". Vincent Jeffries of AllMusic conferred the title of "New Orleans' all-time sludgiest exports" on the band. He described their early material as "completely uncompromising and catchy," while echoing Huey's comparisons to Metallica, Black Sabbath and Pantera. According to author J. J. Anselmi, Crowbar's sound has evolved from "unadultered aggression to [embracing] haunting quietude". Crowbar's early material is said to have "[slowed] down caveman hardcore to a knuckled crawl", while their later output has been said to have "illustrated a penchant for dynamic eeriness, intermixing brutish heaviness with foreboding ether".

They have cited influences including the Melvins, Black Sabbath, Carnivore, Witchfinder General, Saint Vitus, and Trouble.

== Members ==
Crowbar at With Full Force 2019

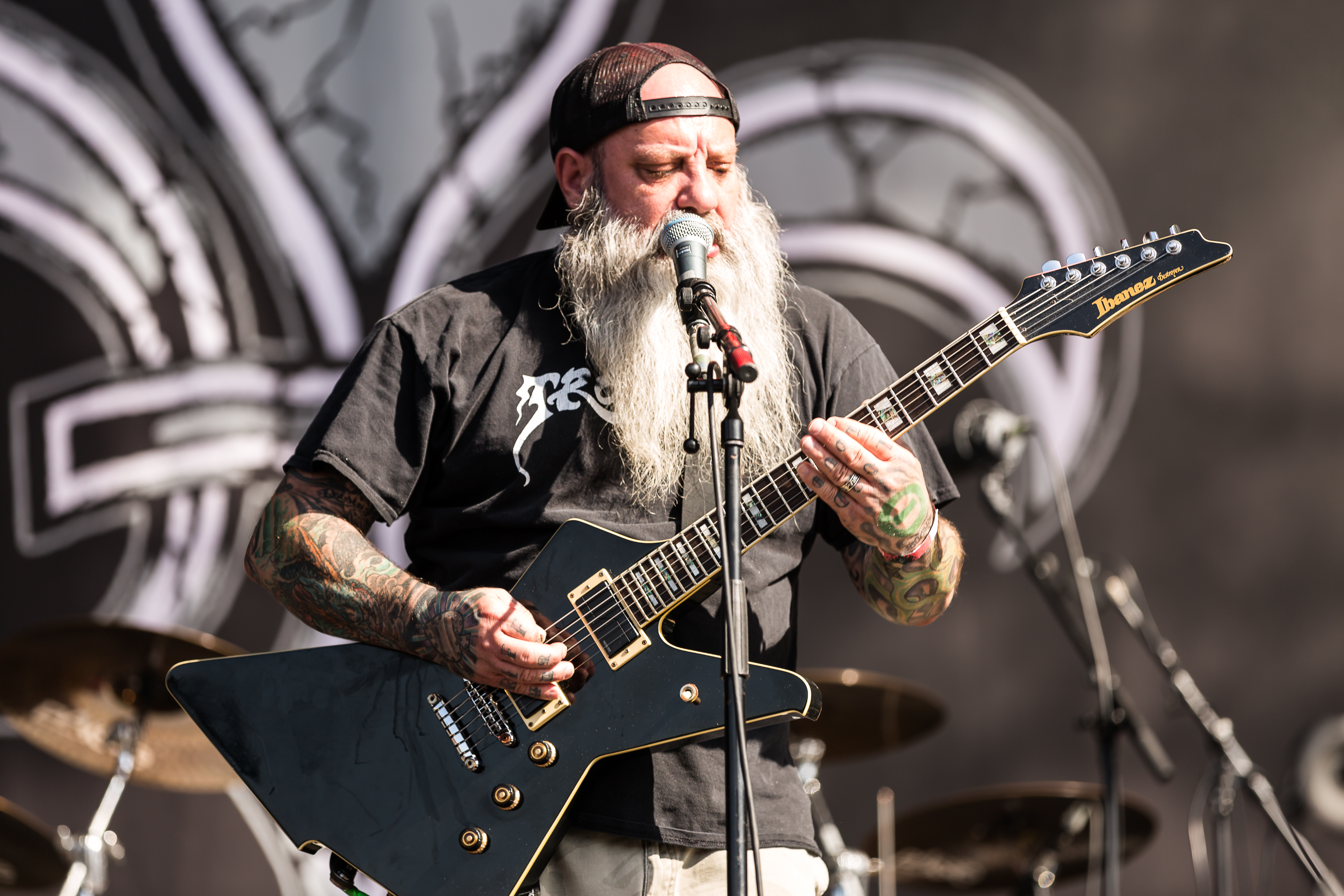
Kirk Windstein

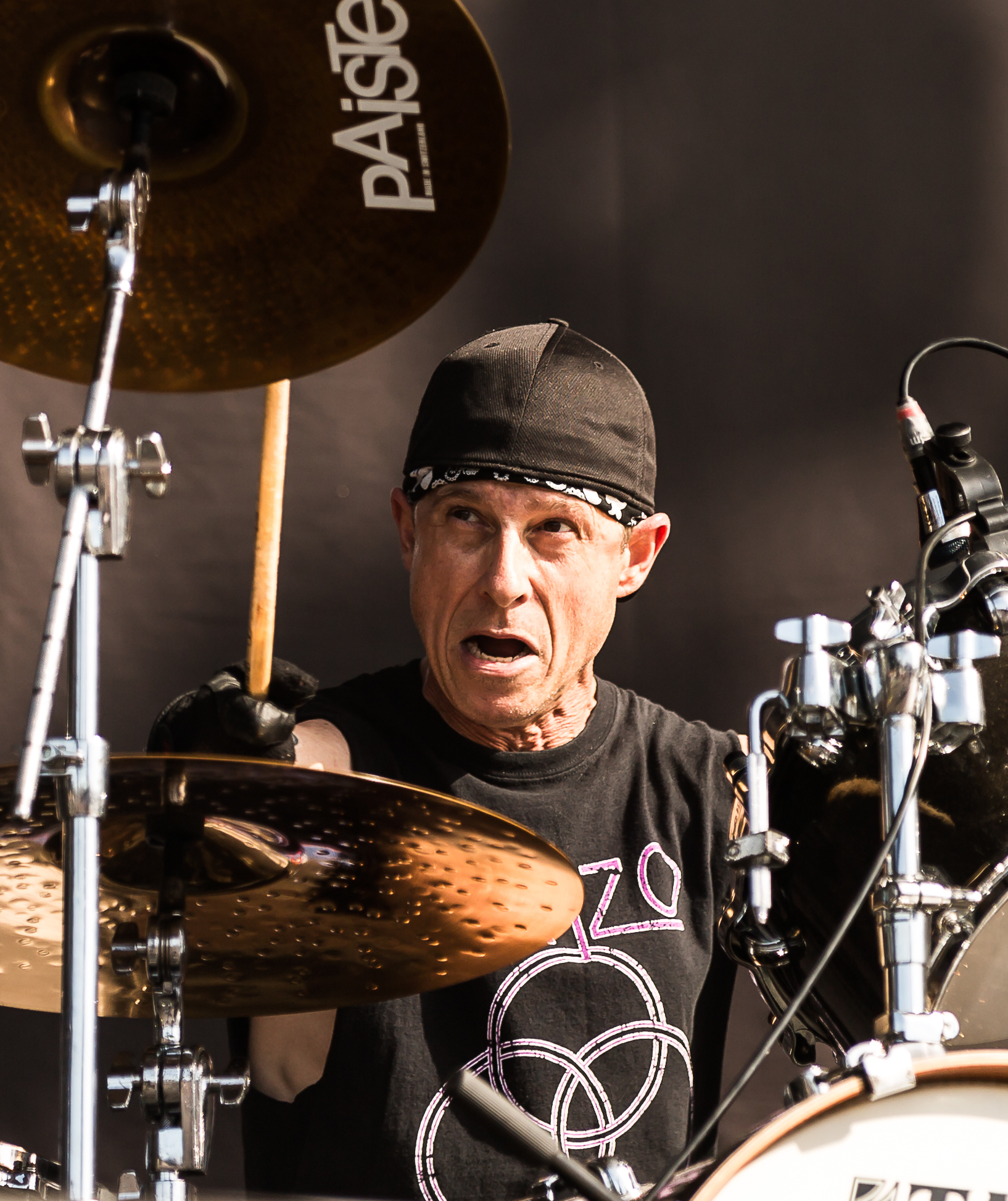
Tommy Buckley

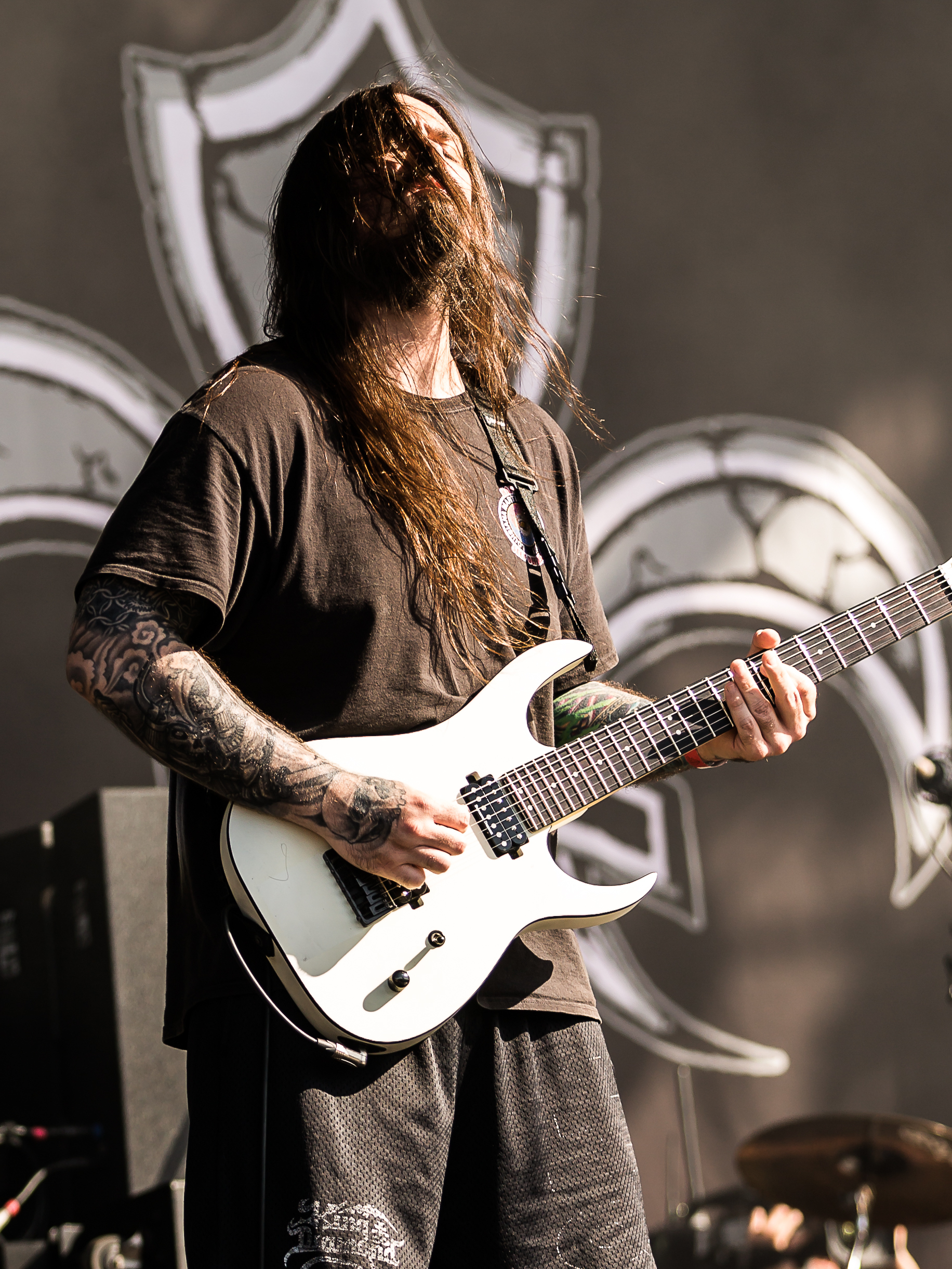
Matt Brunson

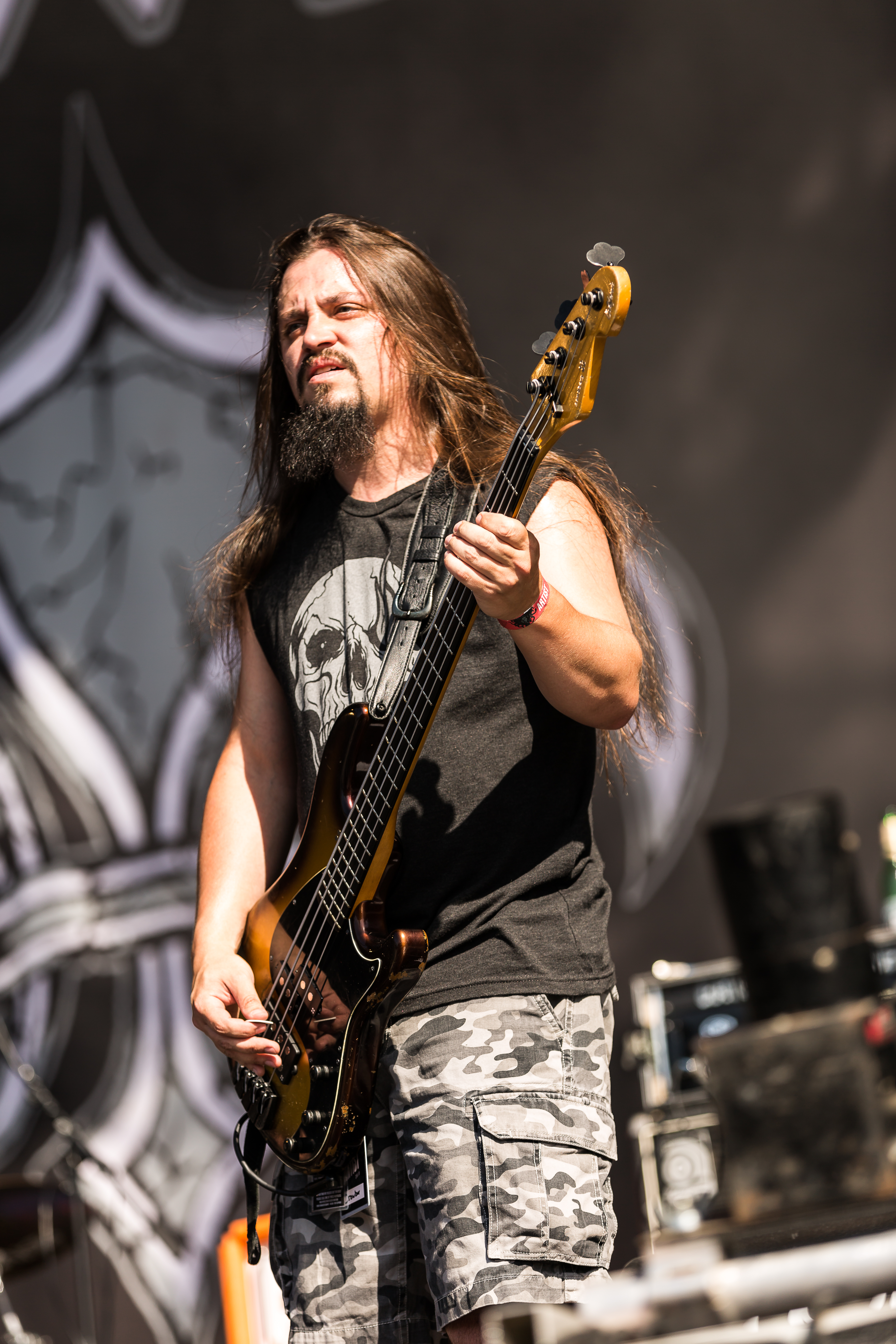
Shane Wesley

=== Current members ===
- Kirk Windstein – vocals, rhythm guitar (1990–present)
- Tommy Buckley – drums (2005–present)
- Matt Brunson – lead guitar (2009–present)
- Pat Bruders – bass (2005–2013, 2025–present)

=== Former members ===
- Todd Strange – bass (1990–2000, 2016–2018)
- Jeremy Young – bass (2000; died 2014)
- Jeff "Okie" Okoneski – bass (2000–2004)
- Rex Brown – bass, acoustic guitar, keyboards (2004–2005)
- Jeff Golden – bass (2013–2016)
- Shane Wesley – bass (2018–2025)
- Kevin Noonan – lead guitar (1990, 1991–1993)
- Jimmy Bower – drums (1990, 1996–1998)
- Wayne "Doobie" Fabra – drums (1991)
- Craig Nunenmacher – drums (1991–1995, 2000, 2004–2005)
- Mitchel Leonard – lead guitar (1991)
- Matt Thomas – lead guitar (1993–1997)
- Jay Abbene – lead guitar (1996)
- Sammy Duet – lead guitar, backing vocals (1998–2002)
- Sid Montz – drums (2000), additional studio percussion (1998–1999)
- Tony Costanza – drums (2001–2004) (died 2020)
- Steve Gibb – lead guitar, backing vocals (2004–2009)

== Discography ==
=== Studio albums ===
- Obedience thru Suffering (September 26, 1991, Pavement Music)
- Crowbar (October 12, 1993, Pavement Music)
- Time Heals Nothing (May 23, 1995, Pavement Music)
- Broken Glass (October 29, 1996, Pavement Music)
- Odd Fellows Rest (July 7, 1998, Mayhem Records)
- Equilibrium (March 7, 2000, Spitfire Records)
- Sonic Excess in Its Purest Form (August 21, 2001, Spitfire Records)
- Lifesblood for the Downtrodden (February 8, 2005, Candlelight Records)
- Sever the Wicked Hand (February 8, 2011, E1 Music)
- Symmetry in Black (May 26, 2014, Century Media Records)
- The Serpent Only Lies (October 28, 2016, E1 Music)
- Zero and Below (March 4, 2022, MNRK Heavy)

=== Live albums ===
- Live +1 EP (March 29, 1994, Pavement Music)

=== Demos ===
- Aftershock (1989, self-released)
- The Slugs (1990, self-released)

=== DVDs ===
- Like Broken (full-length home video, VHS) (1997)
- Live: With Full Force (DVD) (2007)

=== Music videos ===
- "Subversion" (1991)
- "All I Had (I Gave)" (1993)
- "Existence Is Punishment" (1993)
- "The Only Factor" (1995)
- "Like Broken Glass" (1996)
- "I Feel the Burning Sun" (2000)
- "Dead Sun" (2005) (filmed in Miami, Florida, around August 2004 and directed by John-Martin Vogel and Robert Lisman)
- "Lasting Dose" (live) (2005)
- "Planets Collide" (live) (2005)
- "Scattered Pieces Lay" (live) (2005)
- "Slave No More" (2005) (filmed in Miami, Florida, on June 21, 2005, and directed by John-Martin Vogel and Robert Lisman)
- "The Cemetery Angels" (2010)
- "Walk with Knowledge Wisely" (2014)
- "Symmetry in White" (2014)
- "Falling While Rising" (2016)
- "Chemical Godz" (2021)
- "Bleeding From Every Hole" (2022)

== See also ==
- Music of New Orleans#Heavy metal
