= Eyehategod discography =

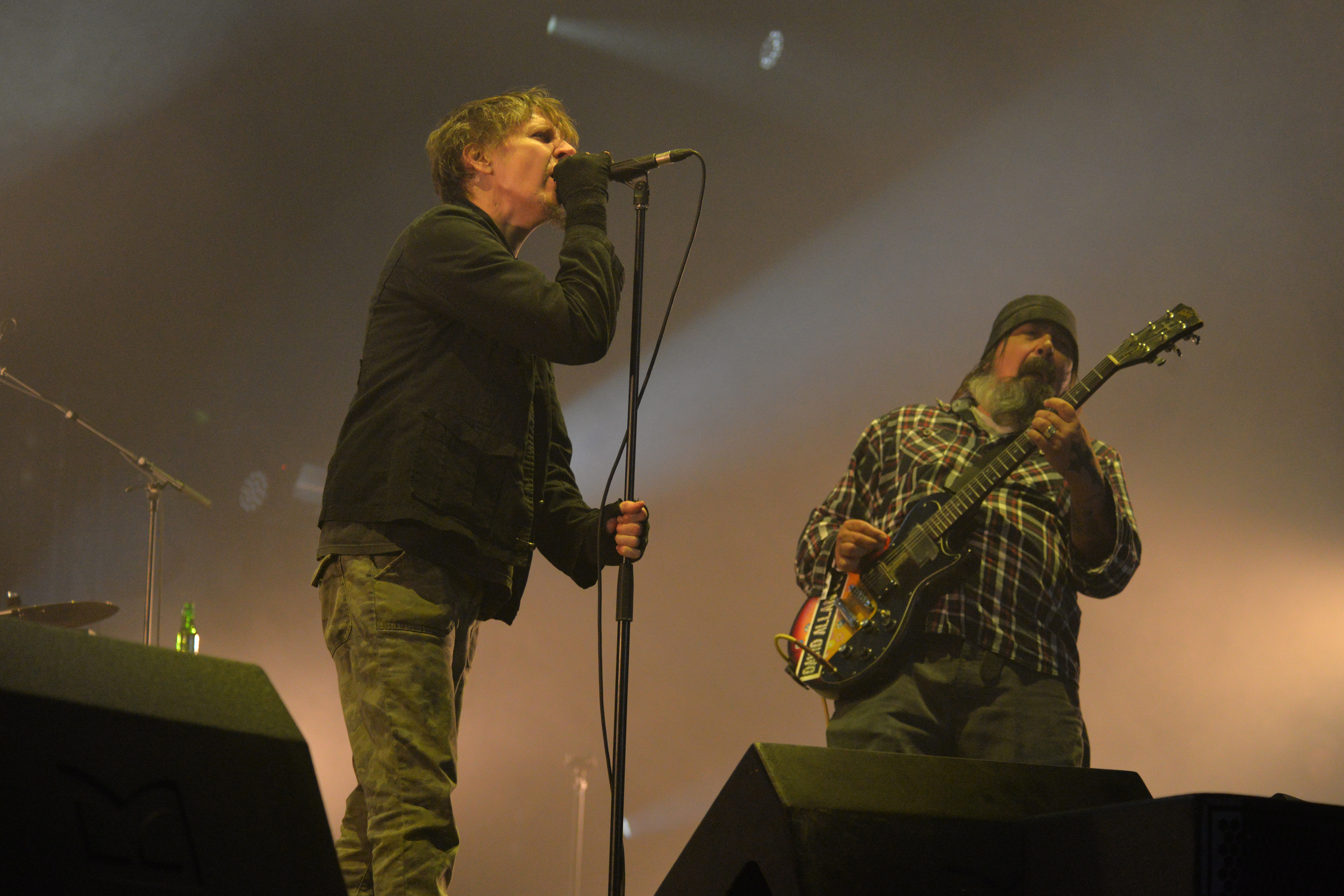
Eyehategod at Hellfest 2018

American sludge metal band Eyehategod has released nine albums since 1989, in addition to EPs and singles. The band also appears on several compilations and has made two music videos.

== Discography ==
=== Albums ===
Year	Title	Type	Label
1989	Garden Dwarf Woman Driver	Demo	Self-released
1990	Lack of Almost Everything	Demo album	Self-released
1992	In the Name of Suffering	Studio album	Century Media
1993	Take as Needed for Pain	Studio album	Century Media
1996	Dopesick	Studio album	Century Media
2000	Southern Discomfort	Compilation album	Century Media
2000	Confederacy of Ruined Lives	Studio album	Century Media
2001	10 Years of Abuse (and Still Broke)	Compilation album	Century Media
2005	Preaching the "End-Time" Message	Compilation album	Emetic Records
2014	Eyehategod	Studio album	Housecore Records
2021	A History of Nomadic Behavior	Studio album	Century Media

=== Singles and EPs ===
Year	Title	Label
1994	"Ruptured Heart Theory"	Bovine Records
1994	"Serving Time in the Middle of Nowhere" (split with 13)	Ax/ction Records
1995	"Southern Discomfort" (split with 13)	Slap-a-Ham Records
1997	"In These Black Days Vol. 1" (split with Anal Cunt)	Hydra Head Records
2002	"The Age of Bootcamp" (split with Soilent Green)	Incision Records
2004	"I Am the Gestapo" (split with Cripple Bastards)	Southern Lord Records
2004	99 Miles of Bad Road	2+2=5
2012	"New Orleans Is the New Vietnam"	A389 Records

The band also appears on several compilations, namely the Gummo soundtrack, Cry Now, Cry Later series of 7-inches, and appear on the Melvins tribute album We Reach: The Music of the Melvins covering "Easy as It Was".

=== DVDs ===
2004	Live in Tokyo	DVD	Press Pause Media/Cassettes
2011	Live	DVD	MVD

=== Singles and music videos ===
- Anxiety Hangover (1996)
- Age of Bootcamp (2002)
- Southern Discomfort (2008)
- Medicine Noose (2014)
- Every Thing, Evey Day (2022)
