= For the Sick =

Compilation album by various artists
- Released: March 20, 2007
- Recorded: 2006
- Genre: Sludge metal
- Label: Emetic Records

For the Sick is the title of the various artist tribute album to one of the most influential sludge metal bands, Eyehategod. It was released through Emetic Records on March 20, 2007.

== Track listing ==
=== CD 1 ===
1. Dot(.) – "Man is Too Ignorant to Exist" (from In the Name of Suffering)
2. Unearthly Trance – "Shinobi" (from In the Name of Suffering)
3. Cable – "Pigs" (from In the Name of Suffering)
4. Bowel – "Run It Into the Ground" (from In the Name of Suffering)
5. Alabama Thunderpussy – "Godsong" (from In the Name of Suffering)
6. Deadbird – "Children of God" (from In the Name of Suffering)
7. Kylesa – "Left to Starve" (from In the Name of Suffering)
8. Rue – "Blank" (from Take as Needed for Pain)
9. Brutal Truth – "Sister Fucker" (from Take as Needed for Pain)
10. Byzantine – "Shop Lift" (from Take as Needed for Pain)
11. Buried at Sea feat. Kevin Sharp – "White Nigger" (from Take as Needed for Pain)
12. Raging Speedhorn – "30$ Bag" (from Take as Needed for Pain)
13. The Unholy 3 – "Take as Needed for Pain" (from Take as Needed for Pain)
14. The Esoteric – "Crimes Against Skin" (from Take as Needed for Pain)
15. Total Fucking Destruction – "Kill Your Boss" (from Take as Needed for Pain)
16. Triac – "My Name is God (I Hate You)" (from Dopesick)
17. One Dead Three Wounded – "Dogs Holy Life" (from Dopesick)
18. Halo of Locusts – "Dixie Whiskey" (from Dopesick)

=== CD 2 ===
1. Minsk – "Ruptured Heart Theory" (from Dopesick)
2. Ramesses – "Lack of All Most Everything" (from Dopesick)
3. The Mighty Nimbus – "Zero Nowhere" (from Dopesick)
4. Lair of the Minotaur – "Peace Thru War (Thru Peace and War)" (from Dopesick)
5. Sourvein – "Broken Down but Not Locked Up" (from Dopesick)
6. Bloody Panda – "Anxiety Hangover" (from Dopesick)
7. Mouth of the Architect – "Story of the Eye" (from Southern Discomfort)
8. Left in Ruin – "Southern Discomfort" (from Southern Discomfort)
9. Watch Them Die – "Serving Time in the Middle of Nowhere" (from Southern Discomfort)
10. Ozenza – "Revolution/Revelation" (from Confederacy of Ruined Lives)
11. Swarm of the Lotus – "Blood Money" (from Confederacy of Ruined Lives)
12. Ichabod – "Jack Ass in the Will of God" (from Confederacy of Ruined Lives)
13. Kill the Client – "The Confusion Machine Process" (from Confederacy of Ruined Lives)
14. Sow Belly – "99 Miles of Bad Road" (from Confederacy of Ruined Lives)
15. If He Dies He Dies – "Age of Bootcamp" (from Preaching the "End-Time" Message)
16. The Nain Rouge – "I Am the Gestapo" (from Preaching the "End-Time" Message)
17. The Unholy 3 – "Torn Between Suicide and Breakfast"
18. Mike Williams - "Kiss My Ass Monday" (radio call-in; unlisted track)

== Trivia ==
- The Unholy 3 is actually Shelton Hank Williams III (i.e. Hank Williams III).
- The tattooed arm pictured on the back of the release is that of unabashed Eyehategod fan D. Randall Blythe of Lamb of God and Halo of Locusts fame according to a Tartarean Desire^{[usurped]} interview with Blythe conducted by Tony Belcher on March 31, 2007.
