= Use Once and Destroy =

Studio album by Superjoint Ritual
- Released: May 21, 2002
- Studios: Balance Recordings Studios, Mandeville, Louisiana
- Genres: Sludge metal, hardcore punk, thrash metal
- Length: 49:10
- Label: Sanctuary
- Producer: Dave Fortman

Superjoint Ritual chronology
| Use Once and Destroy (2002) | A Lethal Dose of American Hatred (2003) |

Professional ratings
Review scores
| Source | Rating |
|---|---|
| AllMusic | 4/5 stars |

Use Once and Destroy is the debut studio album by American heavy metal band Superjoint Ritual, released on May 21, 2002. The guitar and bass work was done by Phil Anselmo and Eyehategod's Jimmy Bower. Drumming was performed by Joe Fazzio. For touring bass duties, the band recruited Hank Williams III. Anselmo did not want to play bass live because he wanted to focus mainly on singing.

Use Once and Destroy is a slightly different approach to music than the work of Pantera, one of Anselmo's other bands. It has been described as a mix of hardcore punk and sludge metal. AllMusic called it "some of the most intense heavy thrash metal to be released in 2002".

The album was re-released in 2006 through Sanctuary / Mayan Records, featuring bonus tracks.

On May 20, 2022, Revolver Magazine respectively reissued the album on a 2LP vinyl cover to celebrate its 20th-anniversary milestone, as well as their second follow-up album, A Lethal Dose of American Hatred. The 20th-anniversary edition art covers were designed by Child Bite lead vocalist Shawn Knight.

== Music videos ==
"Fuck Your Enemy" had a music video, directed by Jim Van Bebber. With its short song length, it found considerable airplay on Uranium throughout 2003. The black and white video begins by passing a door with a sign that reads "Hippies use side door". It then features the band performing in Phil's studio, Nosferatu's Lair, with its walls covered in music posters and logos. Brief shots have the band humorously playing air guitar and drums before reverting to actual instrument performance footage. The song title would be censored as "F*** Your Enemy".

"The Alcoholik" also had a music video, directed by Jim Van Bebber. The video starts with a couple of various shots of the band playing along with the song vigorously. Superjoint and Eyehategod guitarist and Down drummer Jimmy Bower appear as an actor by drinking numerous couple of beer bottles while watching NASCAR on television. It then proceeds as Bower runs to the toilet by breaking the door down, signifying the "PINEAL GLAND" meter as full. The process continues while Bower goes back to drinking alcoholic beverages and smoking cigarettes while on the couch as various shots of Bower were made outside the home. Two unidentified actors came in to force Bower to drink more while the music plays. Various posters and logos were used, including the Confederate flag at the end of the music video.

== Track listing ==
| No. | Title | Length |
|---|---|---|
| 1. | "Oblivious Maximus" | 2:33 |
| 2. | "It Takes No Guts" | 2:06 |
| 3. | "Everyone Hates Everyone" | 3:49 |
| 4. | "The Introvert" | 3:46 |
| 5. | "The Alcoholik" | 2:30 |
| 6. | "Fuck Your Enemy" | 1:40 |
| 7. | "4 Songs" | 6:18 |
| 8. | "Messages" | 2:01 |
| 9. | "All of Our Lives Will Get Tried" | 3:21 |
| 10. | "Antifaith" | 2:14 |
| 11. | "Ozena" | 3:56 |
| 12. | "Drug Your Love" | 2:51 |
| 13. | "Haunted Hated" | 2:40 |
| 14. | "Stupid, Stupid Man" | 2:33 |
| 15. | "Creepy Crawl" | 1:54 |
| 16. | "Superjoint Ritual" | 6:34 |
| Total length: | | 50:46 |

2006 reissue bonus tracks
| No. | Title | Length |
|---|---|---|
| 17. | "Starvation Trip" (demo) | 1:23 |
| 18. | "Little H" (demo) | 2:05 |
| Total length: | | 54:14 |

== Personnel ==
Superjoint Ritual

- Phil Anselmo – vocals, guitars, bass
- Jimmy Bower – guitars, bass
- Joe Fazzio – drums

Production

- Dave Fortman – engineering, mixing, producer
- Mark Casselman – mastering
- Joe Fazzio – artwork, design
- Keith Neltner – design
- Neil Zlozower – photography

== Chart positions ==
Album - Billboard (United States)

| Year | Chart | Position |
|---|---|---|
| 2002 | Billboard 200 | 87 |
| 2002 | Top Independent Albums | 5 |

== Album Reviews ==
- The Hard Times - 2002
- The Daily Egyptian - Superjoint Ritual redefines heavy metal - 2002
- Blabbermouth - SUPERJOINT Releases New Performance Video For 'The Alcoholik' - 2018
- Tinnitist - 2002
- exclaim! - DVD review - Live In Dallas, TX 2002
- The Pitch - 2002
