= Legalize Crime =

EP by Outlaw Order
- Released: 2003
- Recorded: May 2003; The Living Room Studio; Gretna, Louisiana
- Genre: Sludge metal
- Length: ??:?? (7"); 14:30 (reissue)
- Label: 7" - Southern Lord Records; CD - Deep Six Records

Outlaw Order chronology
Legalize Crime (2003)	Dragging Down the Enforcer (2008)

Legalize Crime is the name of the debut EP by Outlaw Order (OO%), a side project of sludge metal band Eyehategod. It was released as a limited edition 7" (1,500 copies were printed) in 2003 and re-released on CD with a bonus live track on October 25, 2006. The reissue is available through Eyehategod's webstore.

== Track listing ==
1. "Byproduct of a Wrecked Society" (2:33)
2. "Delinquent Reich" (3:04)
3. "Illegal in 50 States" (2:08)
4. "D.B.S.E." (3:15)
5. "Worst Liar I Ever Met" (Live) (3:28)

"Worst Liar I Ever Met" is a bonus track on the CD reissue from 2006, and according to Mike Williams, will never be recorded in a studio. "D.B.S.E." stands for "Double Barrel Solves Everything". Track 5 was recorded live on September 1, 2003 in New Orleans, Louisiana.

== Credits ==
- Mike Williams - vocals
- Joey LaCaze - drums
- Gary Mader - guitar
- Marc Shultz - bass
- Brian Patton - guitar
- Chris George - recording
