= Dragging Down the Enforcer =

Studio album by Outlaw Order
- Released: November 10, 2008
- Recorded: April–May 2008; Puma's Lair; Abita Springs, Louisiana
- Genre: Sludge metal
- Length: 27 minutes
- Label: Season of Mist
- Producers: David "The Puma" Troia; Outlaw Order

Outlaw Order chronology
Legalize Crime (2003)	Dragging Down the Enforcer (2008)

Professional ratings
Review scores
Source	Rating
AllMusic	4/5 stars

Dragging Down the Enforcer is the name of the debut album by Outlaw Order, a side-project of the pioneering American sludge metal outfit Eyehategod. It was released in November 2008 in both jewel case and metal box formats. It was originally due to be released on October 13 and 14, but was delayed due to manufacturing issues. There were apparently 13 songs recorded for the album, but the final track listing lists 11, meaning two B-sides exist. Between the release of the Legalize Crime EP and Dragging Down the Enforcer, bassist Justin Grisoli left the band, hence bass parts on the album were recorded by Brian Patton. The track "Double Barrel Solves Everything" previously appeared on Legalize Crime as "D.B.S.E.".

== Track listing ==
1. "Intro" – 0:56
2. "Relive the Crime" – 2:56
3. "Safety Off" – 3:47
4. "Double Barrel Solves Everything" – 2:47
5. "Alcohol Tobacco Firearms" – 2:53
6. "Mercy Shot" – 2:32
7. "Narco-Terrorists" – 2:07
8. "Siege Mentality" – 2:24
9. "Walking Papers" – 3:03
10. "Dragging Down the Enforcer" – 2:56
11. "Outro" – 0:55

All songs written by LaCaze, Mader, Patton and Williams. All lyrics by Williams.

== Personnel ==
- Mike Williams – vocals
- Brian Patton – guitar, bass
- Gary Mader – guitar, artwork, art direction, design
- Joey LaCaze – drums
- Paul Webb – additional riffing on track 5
- David Troia - Producer, Engineer, Mixing
- Scott Hull – mastering
