= Superjoint =

American metal band (1993–2004; 2014–2019)

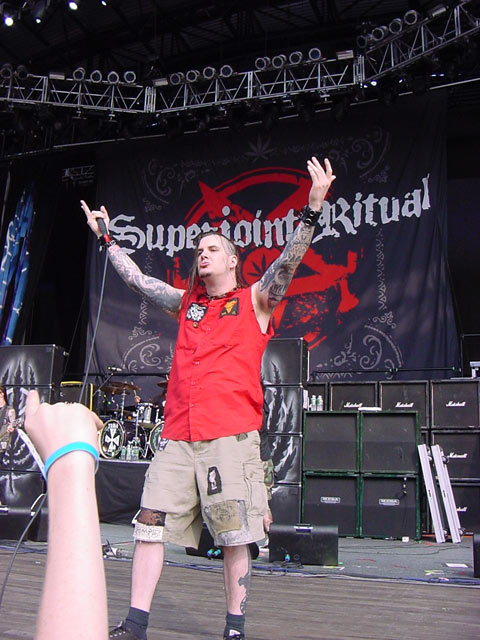
- Phil Anselmo performing with Superjoint Ritual at Ozzfest 2004

Background information
- Also known as: Superjoint Ritual (1993–2004)
- Genres: Sludge metal; hardcore punk
- Years active: 1993–2004; 2014–2019
- Labels: Sanctuary; Housecore
- Past members: Phil Anselmo; Jimmy Bower; Kevin Bond; Joey Gonzalez; Stephen Taylor; Michael Haaga; Joe Fazzio; Hank Williams III; Marzi Montazeri

Superjoint, formerly known as Superjoint Ritual, was an American sludge metal/hardcore punk band formed in 1993 and fronted by vocalist Phil Anselmo. They released three studio albums and broke up in 2004, then reformed from 2014 to 2019.

== History ==
The band was formed by Phil Anselmo, Joe Fazzio, and Jimmy Bower in the early 1990s, later to be joined by Hank Williams III and Kevin Bond. They were founded by Anselmo parallel to his membership in Pantera, but became a full-time endeavor a few years later after Pantera's dissolution.

Despite their early 1990s establishment, it was not until a decade later, after the folding of Pantera, that the group recorded any albums. It was then that Superjoint Ritual garnered significant TV exposure on programs such as MTV2's Headbangers Ball and Fuse TV's Uranium.

However, the group's time in the spotlight would prove short lived. A dispute between Anselmo and Fazzio led to the band's eventual split in late 2004, which was confirmed by both Hank Williams III and Jimmy Bower.

The band reunited at the Housecore Horror Film Festival in Austin, Texas, in October 2014. For unspecified legal reasons, the band performed under the name "Superjoint". Hank Williams III was initially supposed to take part in this first reunion show, but had to bow out due to personal issues.

Although their appearance at Housecore Horror was supposed to be the only reunion show, the band would later perform at Hellfest 2015.

Superjoint released their latest album to date, Caught Up in the Gears of Application, on November 11, 2016, through Housecore Records.

In January 2017, Superjoint played a tour with Battlecross and Child Bite.

In an interview in June 2019, Anselmo mentioned that he was no longer interested in playing with Superjoint. In October 2020, bassist Stephen Taylor said he is unsure if the band is still active. Further interviews with guitarist Jimmy Bower in 2021 confirmed that the band is finished, with no plans to do any further work. Bower cited his and Anselmo's disinterest in working on material related to the band, as well as their existing commitments to Eyehategod and Philip H. Anselmo & The Illegals.

== Musical style and influences ==
Superjoint's style has been described as a mix of sludge metal and hardcore punk. Bands like Venom, Slayer, Celtic Frost, Voivod, and Darkthrone have also been noted as influences. The name "Superjoint Ritual" comes from a lyric in the Darkthrone song "The Pagan Winter". According to Bower, Anselmo wrote 70–80% of the group's music.

== Band members ==
Final lineup

- Phil Anselmo – vocals (1993–2004, 2014–2019), additional guitars (1993–1998, 2002–2004, 2014–2019), lead guitar (1998–2002)
- Jimmy Bower – rhythm guitar (1993–2004, 2014–2019)
- Kevin Bond – lead guitar (2002–2004, 2014–2019), bass (1994–1995)
- Stephen Taylor – bass (2014–2019)
- Jose Gonzalez – drums (2014–2019)

Former

- Joe Fazzio – drums (1993–2004)
- Michael Haaga – bass (1993–1994, 1995–2002)
- Marzi Montazeri – lead guitar (1993–1994)
- Hank Williams III – bass (2002–2004)

Timeline

== Discography ==
=== Studio albums ===
- Use Once and Destroy (2002, Sanctuary Records)
- A Lethal Dose of American Hatred (2003, Sanctuary Records)
- Caught Up in the Gears of Application (2016, Housecore Records)

=== Demos ===
- 1995 Demo
- 1997 Demo

== Videography ==
=== DVDs ===
- Live in Dallas, TX 2002 (2002, Sanctuary Visual Entertainment)
- Live at CBGB's (2004, Sanctuary Visual Entertainment)

=== Music Videos ===
- Fuck Your Enemy (2002)
- The Alcoholik (2002)
- Waiting For the Turning Point (2003)
- Dress Like a Target (2003)
- Caught Up In the Gears of Application (2016)
