= Southern Discomfort (Eyehategod album) =

Compilation album by Eyehategod
- Released: January 25, 2000
- Recorded: 1993–1995
- Genre: Sludge metal
- Length: 42:10
- Label: Eyeball
- Producer: ?

Eyehategod chronology
Dopesick (1996)	Southern Discomfort (2000)	Confederacy of Ruined Lives (2000)

Professional ratings
Review scores
Source	Rating
AllMusic	2.5/5 stars
Collector's Guide to Heavy Metal	7/10
Kerrang!	3/5 stars

Southern Discomfort is a compilation album by sludge metal band Eyehategod, released on January 25, 2000. The title is a reference to the alcoholic drink Southern Comfort. Tracks 1–6 are demos from the Take as Needed for Pain era that ended up on splits and singles. Tracks 7–9 are outtakes from the original Dopesick sessions. These tracks later appeared on the 2006 Century Media reissues of each album. Certain editions of this album feature a red skull on the cover instead of a white one.

== Track listing ==
1. "Ruptured Heart Theory" – 3:33
2. "Story of the Eye" – 2:30
3. "Blank/Shoplift" – 3:58
4. "Southern Discomfort" – 4:25
5. "Serving Time in the Middle of Nowhere" – 3:20
6. "Lack of Almost Everything" – 2:28
7. "Peace Thru War (Thru Peace and War)" – 1:48
8. "Depress" – 4:06
9. "Dopesick Jam" – 16:02

== Personnel ==
- Mike IX Williams – vocals
- Brian Patton – lead guitar
- Jimmy Bower – rhythm guitar
- Mark Schultz – bass (tracks 1–6)
- Vince LeBlanc – bass (tracks 7–9)
- Joey LaCaze – drums
