= Dopesick (album) =

Studio album by Eyehategod
- Released: April 2, 1996
- Recorded: Late 1995
- Studio: Side One Studios, New Orleans, Louisiana
- Genre: Sludge metal; crust punk
- Length: 38:51
- Label: Century Media
- Producer: Billy Anderson, Eyehategod

Eyehategod chronology
Take as Needed for Pain (1993)	Dopesick (1996)	Southern Discomfort (2000)

Alternative cover

Dopesick is the third studio album by American sludge metal band Eyehategod, released on April 2, 1996. It was reissued in 2006 as part of Century Media's 10th Anniversary series with three bonus tracks that were recorded during the original Dopesick recording sessions.

== Recording and production ==
After the release of Take as Needed for Pain, Eyehategod's previous album, the band recorded several demos, which were released on various 7" records and splits on various labels, before finally settling down in late 1995 to record an album, Dopesick. The album featured Billy Anderson and Pepper Keenan as producer and co-producer, respectively, and new bassist Vince LeBlanc. It was recorded at Side One Studios in New Orleans, so frontman Mike Williams had to travel often between there and Clinton Hill, Brooklyn in New York City, where he was living at the time.

The recording sessions were infamously chaotic and involved the studio owner reportedly calling Century Media to ask if the band was mentally unstable and threatening to kick them out. This particular incident occurred after Mike Williams attempted to record the sound of smashing glass for the introduction to the album by smashing a bottle on the floor of the studio. In the process, he slashed open his hand and bled all over the studio floor; this recording did make it to the record as the introduction to the first track, "My Name Is God (I Hate You)". One of the band members then apparently smeared the words "Hell" and "Death to Pigs" in Williams' blood.

The album's recording finished during the winter of 1995. After completion, Brian Patton and Joey LaCaze flew out to San Francisco to mix the album at Hyde Street Studio with Billy Anderson, who would also be the album's engineer.

== Release ==
The album was finally released on April 2, 1996. Thanks to the LP, the band was able to embark on a United States tour in the spring of 1997, supporting White Zombie and Pantera, bringing their music to a far wider audience.

On June 27, 2006, the album was reissued as part of Century Media's 20th Anniversary series of reissues. The new edition included three bonus tracks recorded during the original Dopesick recording sessions.

== Music ==
The album opens with Mike Williams' screams and the sound of a broken bottle. It is somewhat diverse musically, but not in terms of mood. "Dogs Holy Life" and "Non Conductive Negative Reasoning" both feature inventive and ear-grabbing guitar parts before ending abruptly, according to William York of AllMusic. Songs such as "Peace Thru War (Thru Peace and War)" and "Lack of Almost Everything" alternate up-tempo hardcore punk sections with slowed-down grooves. Dopesick sounds slightly different from the band's previous records because it was produced to sound denser and heavier, with the drums more up front in the mix and the guitars sounding especially thick. Chronicles of Chaos' Gino Filicetti went so far as to describe Michael Williams' vocals as "puke-ridden" in a 1996 review of the album for the webzine.

== Critical reception ==
Professional ratings
Review scores
Source	Rating
AllMusic	4.5/5 stars
Chronicles of Chaos	7/10
Collector's Guide to Heavy Metal	6/10
The Encyclopedia of Popular Music	4/5 stars

William York of AllMusic gave the album 4.5 stars out of 5, calling it "an exhausting, challenging listen" but "Eyehategod's most musically accomplished and well-rounded statement". He praised the fact that it is varied musically. The extreme tempo alternations in songs such as "Peace Thru War (Thru Peace and War)" and "Lack of Almost Everything" were very well received.

In 2009, the album was chosen as the number 2 sludge record by Terrorizer, which commented that "[v]icious hardcore punk, crushing metallic comedowns and wave upon merciless wave of feedback serve as both a harrowing soundtrack to their ruined lives and a doomed lovesong to the spirit of the South."

== Track listing ==
Music by Jimmy Bower, Brian Patton, Joey LaCaze and Vince LeBlanc. All lyrics written by Mike Williams, except tracks six and seven, by Williams and Alicia Morgan.

No.	Title	Length
1.	"My Name Is God (I Hate You)"	5:21
2.	"Dogs Holy Life"	1:10
3.	"Masters of Legalized Confusion"	3:57
4.	"Dixie Whiskey"	2:55
5.	"Ruptured Heart Theory"	4:43
6.	"Non Conductive Negative Reasoning"	1:06
7.	"Lack of Almost Everything"	2:48
8.	"Zero Nowhere"	4:23
9.	"Methamphetamine"	1:59
10.	"Peace Thru War (Thru Peace and War)"	1:46
11.	"Broken Down But Not Locked Up"	3:47
12.	"Anxiety Hangover"	4:56
Total length:		38:51

2006 reissue bonus tracks
No.	Title	Length
13.	"Peace Thru War (Thru Peace and War) (Alternate Version)"	1:48
14.	"Depress (Alternate Version)"	4:06
15.	"Dopesick Jam"	16:02
Total length:		60:53

The original version of "Depress" can be found in In the Name of Suffering.

== Usage in other works ==
"My Name Is God (I Hate You)", "Dogs Holy Life", "Dixie Whiskey", "Ruptured Heart Theory", "Lack of Almost Everything", "Zero Nowhere", "Methamphetamine", "Broken Down But Not Locked Up" and "Anxiety Hangover" were covered by different bands for For the Sick, a tribute to Eyehategod by various artists released by Emetic Records. "Dixie Whiskey" is also featured in Identity 3...D!, a compilation album released by Century Media Records. Another cover of this track by Intronaut was included in Century Media's cover album Century Media Records: Covering 20 Years of Extremes.

== Personnel ==
Eyehategod

- Mike IX Williams – vocals
- Brian Patton – lead guitar
- Jimmy Bower – rhythm guitar
- Vince LeBlanc – bass
- Joey LaCaze – drums

Technical personnel

- Billy Anderson – production, engineering, mixing
- Perry Cunningham – remastering
- Tom Bejgrowitz – additional layout
- Charles Elliott – reissue coordination

On the album, the credits for each member of the band are shown in a different way.
