= Clearlight (American band) =

American instrumental rock band

- Also known as: The Mystick Krewe of Clearlight
- Origin: New Orleans, Louisiana, U.S.
- Genres: Stoner rock, heavy metal, psychedelic rock, instrumental rock
- Years active: 1996–2001, 2012, 2016–present
- Labels: Tee Pee, Man's Ruin, Housecore
- Members: Jimmy Bower; Joe Lacaze; Ross Karpelman; Paul Webb; Andy Shepherd

Clearlight is an American instrumental rock band from New Orleans, Louisiana. They are also known as the Mystick Krewe of Clearlight due to other bands using the same original name.

== History ==
The Mystick Krewe of Clearlight was founded in 1996 as an instrumental side-project by members of New Orleans bands Eyehategod, Down, and Crowbar. This project has allowed the members to explore music outside their native metal genre. After several years of shows in New Orleans with the occasional out-of-town show they recorded their self-titled debut album via Tee Pee Records in 2000. This was followed by The Father, the Son and the Holy Smoke, a 2001 split release with Acid King on Man's Ruin Records, featuring Scott "Wino" Weinrich (the Obsessed, Saint Vitus, Spirit Caravan, the Hidden Hand) on vocals. That same year they released a split 7-inch with the Obsessed that features both bands covering Lynyrd Skynyrd. The Mystick Krewe covers "Cheatin Woman" and features Pepper Keenan of Corrosion of Conformity on vocals. They have also been featured on compilations such as Inhale and High Volume: The Stoner Rock Collection.

== Members ==
- Jimmy Bower – guitar (1996–2001, 2012, 2016–present), drums (2016)
- Paul Webb – guitar (1996–2001, 2012, 2016–present)
- Andy Shepherd – bass (1996–2001, 2012, 2016–present)
- Ross Karpelman – electric organ (1996–2001, 2012, 2016–present)
- Kevin Bond - guitar (2016–present)
- Aaron Hill - drums (2016–present)

=== Past members ===
- Joey Lacaze – drums (1996–2001, 2012; died 2013)

== Discography ==
=== Albums ===
- The Mystick Krewe of Clearlight LP/CD (2000 Tee Pee Records)
- The Father, the Son and the Holy Smoke split CD with Acid King (2001 Man's Ruin Records)

=== Singles ===
- Split 7-inch with The Obsessed (both sides are Lynyrd Skynyrd covers) (2001)

=== Compilation tracks ===
- "Railhead" on Inhale CD (2000 Spitfire Records)
- "Electrode" on Guerrilla Jukebox Vol 1 CD (2003 Tee Pee Records)
- "Ride Out" on High Volume: The Stoner Rock Collection CD (2004 High Times Records)
