= A Lethal Dose of American Hatred =

Studio album by Superjoint Ritual
- Released: July 22, 2003
- Recorded: October 2002 – March 2003
- Studio: Balance Recordings Studios, Mandeville, Louisiana; Piety Street Recordings, New Orleans, Louisiana
- Genre: Sludge metal, hardcore punk
- Length: 46:11
- Label: Sanctuary
- Producer: Dave Fortman & Superjoint Ritual

Superjoint Ritual chronology
Use Once and Destroy (2002)	A Lethal Dose of American Hatred (2003)	Caught Up in the Gears of Application (2016)

Professional ratings
Review scores
Source	Rating
AllMusic	4/5 stars
Rolling Stone	3/5 stars

A Lethal Dose of American Hatred is the second studio album by American heavy metal band Superjoint Ritual. Former "touring-only" bassist Hank Williams III is featured on this album. Nearly every song begins with a count-in by vocalist Phil Anselmo. "Waiting for the Turning Point" and "Stealing a Page or Two From Armed & Radical Pagans" are finished versions of the two bonus demos released on their first album, Use Once and Destroy. A Lethal Dose of American Hatred was the band's last full-length studio album before disbanding in December 2004. After reforming in October 2014, the album was followed by Caught Up in the Gears of Application in 2016.

== Music videos ==
"Waiting for the Turning Point" and "Dress Like a Target" both had music videos. As considerably short songs, they both found significant airplay on heavy metal programs and consist largely of live performance. According to an archived version of Pantera news, the live footage was filmed at the State Palace Theatre in New Orleans on June 28, 2003.

== 20th anniversary reissue ==
On May 20, 2022, Revolver Magazine respectively reissued the album on a 2LP vinyl cover alongside Superjoint Ritual's first 20th-anniversary album milestone, Use Once and Destroy. The 20th-anniversary edition art covers were designed by Child Bite lead vocalist Shawn Knight.

== Track listing ==
No.	Title	Length
1.	"Sickness"	3:06
2.	"Waiting for the Turning Point"	1:27
3.	"Dress Like a Target"	2:46
4.	"The Destruction of a Person"	4:26
5.	"Personal Insult"	4:12
6.	"Never to Sit or Stand Again"	5:14
7.	"Death Threat"	2:10
8.	"Permanently"	3:24
9.	"Stealing a Page or Two from Armed and Radical Pagans"	3:28
10.	"Symbol of Nevermore"	5:05
11.	"The Knife Rises"	3:51
12.	"The Horror"	1:17
13.	"Absorbed"	5:45
Total length:		46:11

== Personnel ==
- Phil Anselmo – vocals, additional guitars
- Kevin Bond – lead guitar
- Jimmy Bower – rhythm guitar
- Hank Williams III – bass
- Joe Fazzio – drums

== Chart positions ==
Album – Billboard (United States)

Year	Chart	Position
2003	Billboard 200	55
2003	Top Independent Albums	2
