= Eyehategod (album) =

Studio album by Eyehategod
- Released: May 26, 2014
- Genre: Sludge metal
- Length: 43:14
- Label: Housecore (North America); Century Media (Europe)
- Producer: Eyehategod

Eyehategod chronology
Preaching the "End-Time" Message (2005)	Eyehategod (2014)	A History of Nomadic Behavior (2021)

Eyehategod is the fifth studio album by American sludge metal band Eyehategod. It was released on May 26, 2014 in North America through Housecore Records and on May 27, 2014 in Europe through Century Media Records.

Eyehategod is considered a posthumous album for original drummer Joe LaCaze who died in August 2013 due to respiratory failure, and was replaced by Aaron Hill. It was also the last album to feature lead guitarist Brian Patton before his departure in 2018.

Songs from Eyehategod were performed live as early as 2011, when the album was rumored to be titled Whiskey Drink. A music video was made for the song "Medicine Noose".

== Reception ==
Professional ratings
Aggregate scores
Source	Rating
Metacritic	77/100
Review scores
Source	Rating
AllMusic	(favorable)
Consequence of Sound	B
Exclaim!	9/10
Metal Underground.com	5/5 stars
Pitchfork Media	8.0/10
PopMatters	7/10 stars

Eyehategod received positive reviews from critics. On Metacritic, the album holds a score of 77/100 based on seven reviews, indicating "generally favorable reviews".

== Track listing ==
All tracks are written by Eyehategod.

No.	Title	Length
1.	"Agitation! Propaganda!"	2:23
2.	"Trying to Crack the Hard Dollar"	3:02
3.	"Parish Motel Sickness"	3:41
4.	"Quitter's Offensive"	3:45
5.	"Nobody Told Me"	3:39
6.	"Worthless Rescue"	3:57
7.	"Framed to the Wall"	3:27
8.	"Robitussin and Rejection"	3:38
9.	"Flags and Cities Bound"	7:10
10.	"Medicine Noose"	3:22
11.	"The Age of Bootcamp"	5:10
Total length:		43:14

== Personnel ==
Eyehategod

- Mike IX Williams – vocals
- Brian Patton – lead guitar
- Jimmy Bower – rhythm guitar
- Gary Mader – bass
- Joe LaCaze – drums

Production

- Kevin Bernier – layout
- Nathaniel Shannon – photography
- Collin Jordan – mastering
- Sanford Parker – mixing
- Chris George – engineering
- Billy Anderson – recording (drums)
- Phil Anselmo – recording (vocals)
- Stephen Berrigan – recording (vocals, bass, guitars)
- Daniel Majorie – engineering

== Charts ==
Chart (2014)	Peak position
US Billboard 200	92
US Billboard Hard Rock Albums	4
US Billboard Independent Albums	11
US Billboard Top Rock Albums	26
US Billboard Tastemaker Albums	7
US Billboard Top Album Sales	92

== Release history ==
Region	Date	Distributing Label
Japan	May 21, 2014	Daymare Records
Europe	May 26, 2014	Century Media Records
Australia	May 26, 2014	Century Media Records
New Zealand	May 26, 2014	Century Media Records
United States	May 27, 2014	Housecore Records
