= Caught Up in the Gears of Application =

Studio album by Superjoint
- Released: November 11, 2016
- Studio: Nodferatu's Lair, Louisiana
- Genre: Sludge metal, hardcore punk
- Length: 38:12
- Label: Housecore
- Producer: Phil Anselmo, Stephen Berrigan

Superjoint chronology
A Lethal Dose of American Hatred (2003)	Caught Up in the Gears of Application (2016)

Professional ratings
Review scores
Source	Rating
Metal Injection	7.5/10
Blabbermouth.net	9/10

Caught Up in the Gears of Application is the third and final album by American heavy metal band Superjoint. It was released on November 11, 2016, through Phil Anselmo's own record label Housecore Records. Caught Up in the Gears of Application is the first full-length studio album put out by the band in over 13 years.

== Track listing ==
No.	Title	Length
1.	"Today and Tomorrow"	3:24
2.	"Burning the Blanket"	2:33
3.	"Ruin You"	2:25
4.	"Caught Up in the Gears of Application"	2:43
5.	"Sociopathic Herd Delusion"	2:35
6.	"Circling the Drain"	4:31
7.	"Clickbait"	5:21
8.	"Asshole"	2:37
9.	"Mutts Bite Too"	3:56
10.	"Rigging the Fight"	2:34
11.	"Receiving No Answer to the Knock"	5:33
Total length:		38:12

== Personnel ==
- Phil Anselmo – vocals, additional guitars
- Kevin Bond – lead guitar
- Jimmy Bower – rhythm guitar
- Stephen Taylor – bass
- Jose Manuel "Blue" Gonzalez – drums
