= Jimmy Bower =

American guitarist and drummer

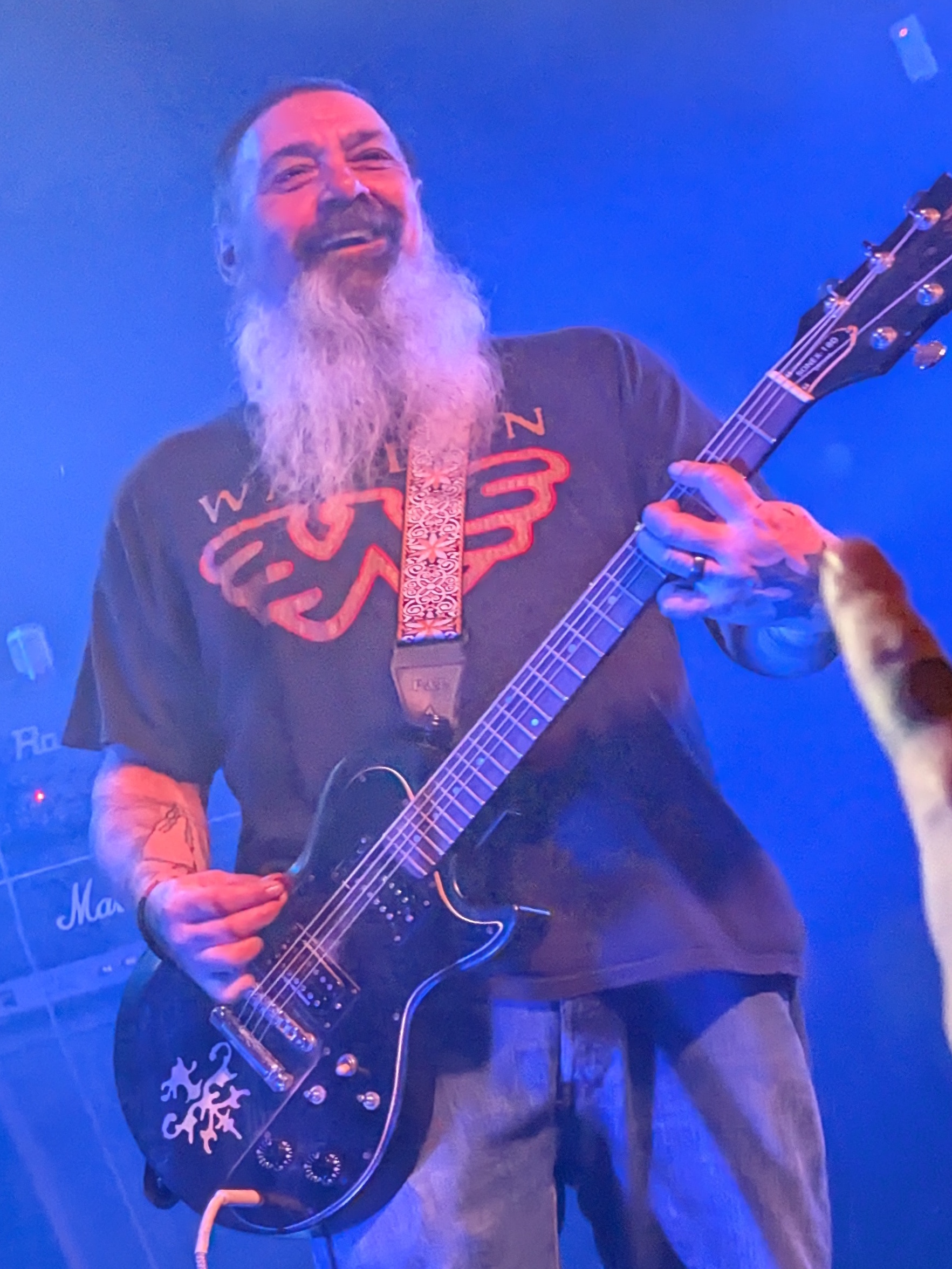
- Bower with Eyehategod in 2024

Background information
- Born: September 18, 1968 (age 57)
- Origin: New Orleans, Louisiana, U.S.
- Genres: Sludge metal; doom metal; southern metal; stoner metal; hardcore punk
- Occupation: Musician
- Instruments: Guitar; drums
- Member of: Down; Eyehategod; Clearlight
- Formerly of: Crowbar; Corrosion of Conformity; Superjoint

Jimmy Bower (born September 18, 1968) is an American musician, best known as the guitarist for sludge metal band Eyehategod and drummer for southern metal supergroup Down. He previously also played drums with Crowbar (with Down bandmates Kirk Windstein and Todd Strange) and Corrosion of Conformity (with Down bandmate Pepper Keenan), and rhythm guitar in Superjoint (with Down bandmate Phil Anselmo).

== Career ==
Bower was the drummer for a hardcore punk band called ShellShock in early 1988 when Kirk Windstein joined as guitarist/vocalist, replacing original vocalist Greg Hatch. Other members were guitarist Mike "Hatch Boy" Hatch and bassist Mike Savoie, although this band disbanded when Hatch committed suicide in November of that year. Bower and Windstein then moved on and founded a band called The Slugs with guitarist Kevin Noonan and bassist Todd Strange. After releasing a demo tape in mid 1990, the band collapsed, and Bower left. The Slugs would later become the influential sludge metal band Crowbar.

While still in ShellShock, Bower was a founding member of Eyehategod, another pioneering sludge metal act, in 1988. He is the only continuous member of the band, following the death of co-founder and drummer Joey LaCaze in August 2013. He and vocalist Mike Williams (who replaced original vocalist Chris Hilliard shortly after the band's formation) are the only band members to perform on all of the band's studio albums. Bower played rhythm guitar for the band until the departure of long-time guitarist Brian Patton in 2018, after which Bower has continued as sole guitarist.

In 1991, Bower co-founded Down, a supergroup consisting of vocalist Phil Anselmo (Pantera), guitarists Pepper Keenan (Corrosion of Conformity) and Kirk Windstein (Crowbar), and bassist Todd Strange (also of Crowbar). Bower has been the drummer of Down ever since.

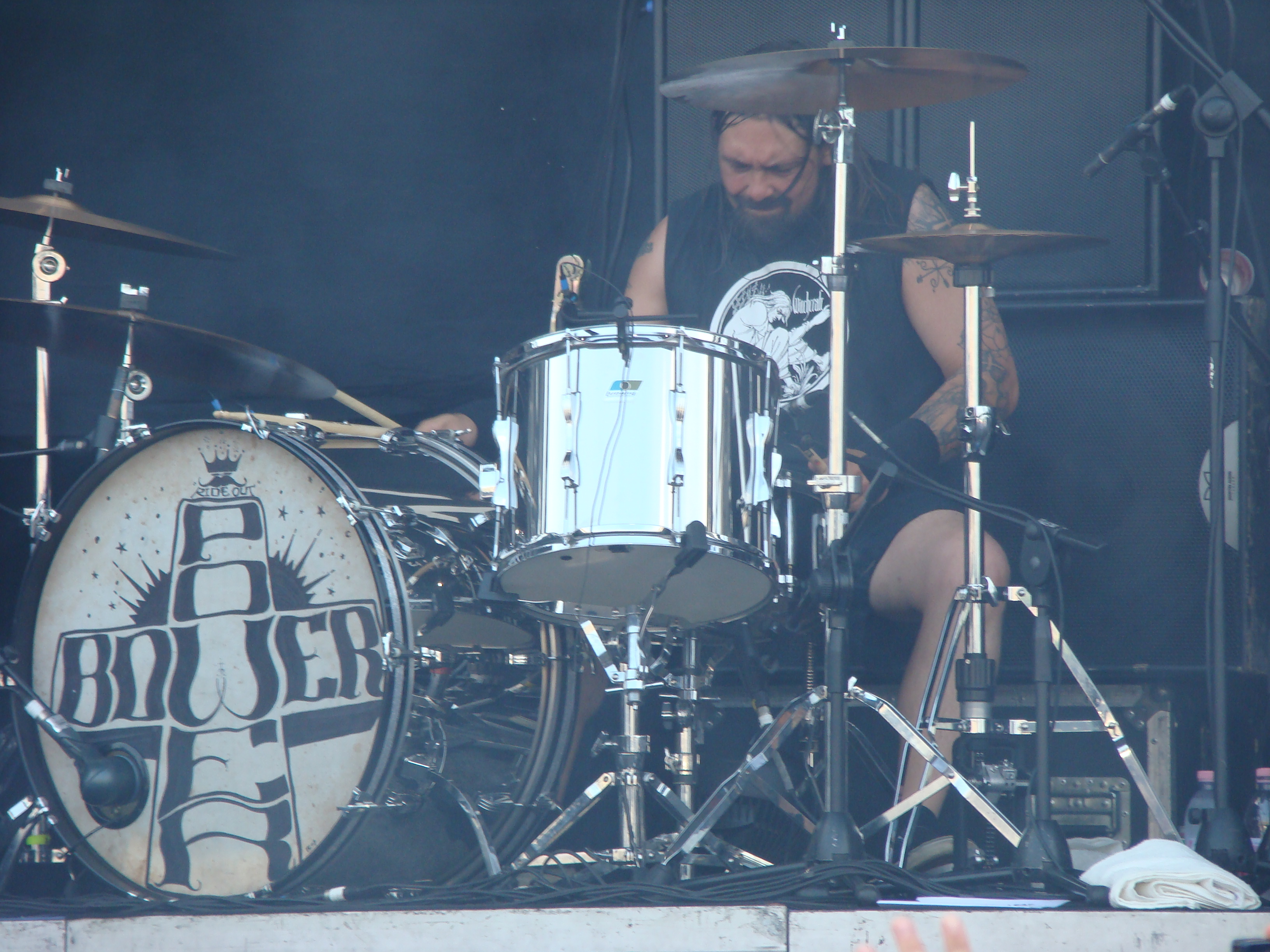
Bower playing drums with Down in 2009

Outside of Down, Bower was a founding member of Superjoint Ritual alongside Anselmo and drummer Joe Fazzio. Despite being founded in the mid-1990s, the band did not get exposure until the early 2002, at which point the band consisted of Bower on rhythm guitar, Anselmo on vocals and guitars, lead guitarist Kevin Bond, Hank Williams III on bass, and drummer Joe Fazzio. Superjoint Ritual released two studio albums before quietly splitting in 2004.

In 1996, Bower rejoined Crowbar. He played on the band's albums Broken Glass (1996) and Odd Fellows Rest (1998) before departing in 1998. Also in 1996, he was a founding member of an instrumental rock band called Clearlight (also known as the Mystick Krewe of Clearlight) alongside Eyehategod drummer Joey LaCaze. This group went on hiatus in 2001 when their equipment was stolen.

After Clearlight went on hiatus in 2001, Bower joined Corrosion of Conformity (alongside Down bandmate Pepper Keenan) as a replacement for founding drummer Reed Mullin who had suffered a back injury. Bower played drums on COC's live album Live Volume (2001) before being replaced by Merritt Partridge in mid-2002 to focus on other projects.

In 2014, Superjoint Ritual returned, initially as a one-off appearance at Housecore Horror Film Festival in Texas, and later at Hellfest. Although the group later started writing material, which became Caught Up in the Gears of Application (2016). This reunion did not feature the involvement of Williams or Fazzio, the former due to his personal commitments and the latter due to a disagreement with Anselmo which led to the band's original hiatus. Their places were taken by Stephen Taylor and Jose Gonzalez respectively. Superjoint began a period on inactivity in 2019, which continued into 2020, before Bower confirmed the band's end in 2021, due to Anselmo's commitments to Philip H. Anselmo and the Illegals and Bower's commitment to Eyehategod.

== Discography ==
=== Eyehategod ===
Main Article: Eyehategod discography

- In the Name of Suffering (1990)
- Take as Needed for Pain (1993)
- Dopesick (1996)
- Confederacy of Ruined Lives (2000)
- Eyehategod (2014)
- A History of Nomadic Behavior (2021)

=== Down ===
- NOLA (1995)
- Down II: A Bustle in Your Hedgerow (2002)
- Down III: Over the Under (2007)
- Down IV Part I - The Purple EP (2012)
- Down IV – Part II

=== Crowbar ===
- Broken Glass (1996)
- Like Broken (1997) VHS
- Odd Fellows Rest (1998)

=== Superjoint Ritual ===
- Use Once and Destroy (2002)
- A Lethal Dose of American Hatred (2003)
- Caught Up in the Gears of Application (2016)

=== Corrosion of Conformity ===
- Live Volume (2001)

=== Other appearances ===
Year	Band	Title	Notes
1992	Drip	Learning About Manners	Drums, also feaures Mike IX Williams and Brian Patton of Eyehategod
2000	Suplecs	Wrestlin' with My Lady Friend	Producer
2008	My Uncle the Wolf	My Uncle the Wolf	Producer
2011	Gasmiasma	Trenchrats E.P.	Recording
2019	En Minor	On the Floor / There's a Long Way to Go	Drums, also features Kevin Bond and Phil Anselmo of Superjoint
2020	En Minor	When the Cold Truth Has Worn Its Miserable Welcome Out	Drums, also features Kevin Bond and Stephen Taylor of Superjoint
