= 10 Years of Abuse (and Still Broke) =

Live album by Eyehategod
- Released: May 29, 2001
- Recorded: ? (1990); KXLU Los Angeles (August 2, 1994); Europe (April 2000)
- Genre: Sludge metal
- Length: 75:36
- Label: Century Media
- Producer: Dave Fortman; Eyehategod

Eyehategod chronology
Confederacy of Ruined Lives (2000)	10 Years of Abuse (and Still Broke) (2001)	Preaching the "End-Time" Message (2005)

Professional ratings
Review scores
Source	Rating
AllMusic	2.5/5 stars
Collector's Guide to Heavy Metal	7/10
Kerrang!	2/5 stars

10 Years of Abuse (and Still Broke) is sludge metal band Eyehategod's only live album, released on May 29, 2001. Although not all the tracks are live, it is still considered a live album, as the majority of tracks are live, and there are no studio tracks (the rest consist of demos and radio performances).

== Track listing ==
1. "Left To Starve" – 5:08
2. "Hit a Girl" – 5:16
3. "Depress" – 9:29
4. "Children of God" – 4:44
5. "White Nigger" – 4:08
6. "Depress" – 3:28
7. "Take as Needed for Pain" – 5:08
8. "My Name is God (I Hate You)" – 5:07
9. "Lack of Almost Everything" – 4:36
10. "Blood Money" – 3:47
11. "Children of God" – 4:52
12. "Sister Fucker, Pt. 1/Sister Fucker, Pt. 2" – 5:51
13. "30$ Bag" – 3:11
14. "Zero Nowhere" – 5:15
15. "Methamphetamine" – 5:37

Tracks 1–4 are taken from the original 1990 demo Lack of Almost Everything. Tracks 5–8 were recorded live on KXLU, August 2, 1994. Tracks 9–15 were recorded live in Europe, April 2000. All songs written by Eyehategod.

== Credits ==
=== Tracks 1–4 ===
- Jim Bower – Guitar
- Mike IX Williams – Vocals
- Joe LaCaze – Drums
- Marc Schultz – Bass
- Steve Dale – Guitar

=== Tracks 5–8 ===
- Jim Bower – Guitar
- Michael Williams – Vocals
- Joe LaCaze – Drums
- Marc Schultz – Bass
- Brian Patton – Guitar
- Chris Elder – Recording
- Phil Vera – Recording

=== Tracks 9–15 ===
- Jim Bower – Guitar
- Michael Williams – Vocals
- Joe LaCaze – Drums
- Danny Nick – Bass
- Brian Patton – Guitar
- Dave Fortman – Producer

=== Others ===
- Angela Boatwright – Live Photo
- Tom Bejgrowicz – Design, Layout and Additional Photography
