= Arson Anthem =

American hardcore punk band

- Left to right: Hank Williams III, Collin Yeo, Mike Williams, Phil Anselmo

Background information
- Origin: New Orleans, Louisiana, U.S.
- Genres: Hardcore punk; crust punk
- Years active: 2006–2013
- Label: Housecore
- Members: Phil Anselmo; Mike Williams; Hank Williams III; Collin Yeo

Arson Anthem was an American hardcore punk supergroup formed in New Orleans, Louisiana, in 2006. The lineup comprised singer Mike Williams of Eyehategod, guitarist Phil Anselmo (best known as the vocalist for Pantera and Down), Hank Williams III on drums (best known as a country and metal singer), and bassist Collin Yeo.

After losing all his possessions in the aftermath of Hurricane Katrina, Mike Williams moved into Anselmo's spare apartment. The two bonded over listening to Phil's collection of early hardcore bands. They began jamming with Hank III and Collin Yeo, who were united by their desire to work with a hardcore punk band.

According to Williams, the group spent six days in Houston, Texas recording eight songs in the spring of 2006. Their self-titled debut EP was released on February 19, 2008.

The 2010 album Insecurity Notoriety received a nod from Exclaim! for the No. 7 Metal Album of the Year.

When asked in an interview on July 17, 2013, if anything new would happen with Arson Anthem, Anselmo said "Arson? No. There's probably nothing new going to happen with Arson but, it was fun to do while it lasted [...] So Arson, like I said is one of many side projects that I've done in the past but as for right now nah, there's nothing left to do."

== Members ==
- Mike Williams – vocals
- Phil Anselmo – guitar
- Collin Yeo – bass
- Hank Williams III – drums

== Discography ==
=== Studio albums ===
- Insecurity Notoriety (October 12, 2010)

=== Extended plays ===
- Arson Anthem (February 19, 2008)

=== Compilations ===
- Housecore Records Compilation Volume 1 (2009) (track "Crippled Life")
