= A History of Nomadic Behavior =

Studio album by Eyehategod
- Released: March 12, 2021
- Studio: HighTower Recordings, New Orleans, Louisiana; Hypercube Studios, Chicago
- Genre: Sludge metal
- Length: 41:54
- Label: Century Media
- Producer: Eyehategod; Sanford Parker; James Whitten

Eyehategod chronology
| Eyehategod (2014) | A History of Nomadic Behavior (2021) |

Professional ratings
Aggregate scores
| Source | Rating |
|---|---|
| Metacritic | 78/100 |
Review scores
| Source | Rating |
| Consequence of Sound | A− |
| Decibel | 7/10 |
| Exclaim! | 7/10 |
| Kerrang! | 3/5 stars |
| Pitchfork | 7.2/10 |

A History of Nomadic Behavior is the sixth studio album by American sludge metal band Eyehategod. It was released on March 12, 2021, by Century Media. It was the first album to feature drummer Aaron Hill after Joey LaCaze's death.

== Background ==
The album was recorded at HighTower Records and Hypercube Studios, with producers Sanford Parker and James Whitten.

== Release ==
On November 17, 2020, the band revealed they were releasing their sixth studio album after seven years. Vocalist Mike IX Williams said of the album: "During this recording, I thought a lot about how stupid humanity has become and how America is now completely divided with these people who don't believe in science and blindly follow liars and nonsensical ideologies. Some of those feelings may have found their way into these songs, but it is mostly subliminal."

=== Singles ===
Eyehategod released their first single "High Risk Trigger" on December 4, 2020. The single has been described with "high level distorted guitar nastiness while singer Mike IX Williams belts furiously." Revolver said the single was an "apocalyptic rager instilled with the anxiety and insurgency of our times."

The second single "Fake What's Yours" was released on January 15, 2021. Williams said of the single: "it's a pure uncut chunk of anti-authoritarian preach-speak set to a condescending guitar riff that could only be born from the dirty streets of New Orleans."

On February 19, 2021, the third single "Circle of Nerves" was released. Mike Williams said of the single: "Circle Of Nerves is the last single before the release of our new album, A History Of Nomadic Behavior. This track is a prime example of the lowest form of abstract crossover trash to crawl out of the methadone clinic basement."

== Critical reception ==
A History of Nomadic Behavior was met with "generally favorable" reviews from critics. At Metacritic, which assigns a weighted average rating out of 100 to reviews from mainstream publications, this release received an average score of 78 based on 5 reviews.

Writing for Exclaim!, Chris Ayers explained: "A History of Nomadic Behavior is difficult to swallow, as it jumps the rails a bit into new territory for the veteran band. The album's production is too polished, which somewhat contradicts the band's filth-caked persona. Instead of their lovable, sloppy sludge with festering warts and all, Nomadic Behavior is squeaky clean and coherent, with a surgical gravity to each and every downtuned chord. It contains enough traditional elements to appease the older fans and delight the newer ones, yet its sonic oddities remain to confound the chaos." Angela Davey of Kerrang! stated: "The guitars chug along with a blues tinged bounce, as the percussion pounds like glacially paced hammer blows. However, the star of the show on any Eyehategod release is always going to be the vocals; Mike’s trademark angry tirade is always recognisable and it's satisfying to hear it make a welcome return."

In a more mixed review, Colin of Lambgoat noted: "Perhaps it's the thin sounding production or the flow of the material, but the untethered energy of the band's past catalog is absent, leaving the group, now a four-piece, sounding rather... tame."

== Track listing ==
A History of Nomadic Behavior track listing
| No. | Title | Length |
|---|---|---|
| 1. | "Built Beneath the Lies" | 3:33 |
| 2. | "The Outer Banks" | 2:31 |
| 3. | "Fake What's Yours" | 3:38 |
| 4. | "Three Black Eyes" | 2:27 |
| 5. | "Current Situation" | 4:41 |
| 6. | "High Risk Trigger" | 4:18 |
| 7. | "Anemic Robotic" | 2:44 |
| 8. | "The Day Felt Wrong" | 3:57 |
| 9. | "The Trial of Johnny Cancer" | 4:25 |
| 10. | "Smoker's Piece" | 1:11 |
| 11. | "Circle of Nerves" | 3:47 |
| 12. | "Every Thing, Every Day" | 4:42 |
| Total length: | | 41:47 |

Japanese edition bonus tracks
| No. | Title | Length |
|---|---|---|
| 13. | "Fake What's Yours" (Instrumental) | 3:37 |
| 14. | "Everything, Everyday" (Instrumental) | 4:04 |
| Total length: | | 49:38 |

== Charts ==
Chart performance for A History of Nomadic Behavior
| Chart (2021) | Peak position |
|---|---|
| German Albums (Offizielle Top 100) | 33 |
| Scottish Albums (OCC) | 92 |
| Swiss Albums (Schweizer Hitparade) | 96 |
