= Confederacy of Ruined Lives =

Studio album by Eyehategod
- Released: September 19, 2000
- Recorded: May–June 2000
- Studios: Balance Productions, Mandeville, Louisiana
- Genre: Sludge metal
- Length: 40:09
- Label: Century Media
- Producers: Dave Fortman, Eyehategod

Eyehategod chronology
Southern Discomfort (2000)	Confederacy of Ruined Lives (2000)	10 Years of Abuse (and Still Broke) (2001)

Professional ratings
Review scores
Source	Rating
AllMusic	3/5 stars
Brave Words & Bloody Knuckles	9/10
Collector's Guide to Heavy Metal	7/10
The Encyclopedia of Popular Music	3/5 stars

Confederacy of Ruined Lives is the fourth studio album by sludge metal band Eyehategod, released on September 19, 2000. The track "Jack Ass in the Will of God" is a reworking of the title track to Southern Discomfort.

== Track listing ==
All lyrics are written by Mike IX Williams; all music is composed by Jimmy Bower, Joe LaCaze, Brian Patton, Danny Nick and Mike IX Williams.

No.	Title	Length
1.	"Revelation / Revolution"	4:17
2.	"Blood Money"	4:10
3.	"Jack Ass in the Will of God"	2:46
4.	"Self Medication Blues"	4:45
5.	"The Concussion Machine Process"	2:19
6.	"Inferior and Full of Anxiety"	3:18
7.	".001%"	6:22
8.	"99 Miles of Bad Road"	3:47
9.	"Last Year (She Wanted a Doll House)"	4:52
10.	"Corruption Scheme"	3:33
Total length:		40:09

== Personnel ==
Eyehategod

- Mike IX Williams – vocals
- Brian Patton – lead guitar
- Jimmy Bower – rhythm guitar
- Danny Nick – bass
- Joe LaCaze – drums

Production

- Dave Fortman – producer, mixing
- Tom Bejgrowicz – artwork, design, layout
