= In the Name of Suffering =

- Original 1990 Intellectual Convulsion cover

Studio album by Eyehategod
- Released: May 11, 1990; December 1, 1992
- Studios: Festival Studios, Kenner, Louisiana
- Genre: Sludge metal
- Length: 35:03
- Labels: Intellectual Convulsion (1990); Century Media (1992)
- Producer: Eyehategod

Eyehategod chronology
In the Name of Suffering (1990)	Take as Needed for Pain (1993)

Alternative cover
- 1992 Century Media reissue cover

In the Name of Suffering is the debut album by American sludge metal band Eyehategod. It was initially released in 1990 through French independent label Intellectual Convulsion and reissued in 1992 by Century Media.

== Background and recording ==
Eyehategod was formed in 1988 and recorded two demos, Garden Dwarf Woman Driver and Lack of Almost Everything, released in the years 1989 and 1990, respectively. Originally, the band did not take themselves seriously, and only formed to rebel against what they call "the norm of underground music at the time". The album was recorded and produced by the band themselves at Festival Studios in Kenner, Louisiana for about $1,000.

== Release ==
The album was originally released by French label Intellectual Convulsion, but only around 1,500–2,000 CD and vinyl copies were pressed before the label had to shut down due to financial difficulties. The group would later be signed onto Century Media, who re-released the album with new artwork on December 1, 1992. In 2004, Emetic Records repressed the album on vinyl, 1,000 copies total: 300 green marbled, 700 black. In 2006, as a part of Century Media's 20th anniversary, the album was reissued with the original cover art and the entirety of the band's 1990 demo Lack of Almost Everything as bonus tracks. These same exact demo recordings also appeared on the band's 2001 live album 10 Years of Abuse (and Still Broke). The year 2008 saw Emetic Records again reissuing the album on vinyl, this time as a double disc LP set with the first disc being composed of the album itself and the second disc being made up of the same four bonus Lack of Almost Everything demos from the 2006 CD reissue. This 2008 pressing was limited to 500 black copies. This edition would later be repressed in 2011, again in quantities of 500 black copies.

In 2015, the album, along with Take as Needed for Pain, was repressed on vinyl through Century Media. This 2015 pressing was made available on black, white (limited to 100 copies) and gold (limited to 500 copies) colored vinyl. Also released on the same day was a four-disc CD boxset containing the group's first four albums (including In the Name of Suffering).

== Music ==
In the Name of Suffering has been described as the "most primitive sounding" of Eyehategod's output, and has been characterized as sounding "dense [and] crusty." The guitars have been described as "coarse and grainy," and the sound of Joey LaCaze's snare drum has been likened to "a wooden plank being hit by a hammer." The album is played at mostly slow tempos, drawing comparisons to the early work of the Melvins. The album also takes stylistic cues from Black Flag and Black Sabbath, as well as from southern rock. Despite its mostly slow tempos, the album contains some up-tempo songs reminiscent of hardcore punk.

== Reception ==
Professional ratings
Review scores
Source	Rating
AllMusic	3/5 stars
Collector's Guide to Heavy Metal	6/10
The Encyclopedia of Popular Music	2/5 stars

Since its initial release, In the Name of Suffering has received praise for its rough style, and is seen as one of the first, as well as one of the most important, sludge metal albums of the 1990s. Heavy metal website Hellbound.ca mentioned how In the Name of Suffering, along with its follow-up Take as Needed for Pain, created the framework for "one of the most interesting, yet disturbing, bands around". In William York's review of the album for AllMusic, he states "Later Eyehategod albums have more memorable songs, but In the Name of Suffering arguably captures the band's compelling ugliness in its most raw state."

== Track listing ==
All lyrics are written by Mike Williams; all music is composed by Jimmy Bower, Joseph LaCaze, Mark Schultz and Steve Dale.

No.	Title	Length
1.	"Depress"	4:58
2.	"Man Is Too Ignorant to Exist"	2:37
3.	"Shinobi"	5:15
4.	"Pigs"	2:59
5.	"Run It into the Ground"	3:10
6.	"Godsong"	2:44
7.	"Children of God"	3:10
8.	"Left to Starve"	3:09
9.	"Hostility Dose"	2:43
10.	"Hit a Girl"	4:18
Total length:		35:03

2006 reissue bonus tracks
No.	Title	Length
11.	"Left to Starve" (demo)	4:06
12.	"Hit a Girl" (demo)	4:12
13.	"Depress" (demo)	7:34
14.	"Children of God" (demo)	3:46
Total length:		54:41

== Release history ==
Region	Date	Label	Format	Catalog
France	1990	Intellectual Convulsion	CD, LP	SPASM III
Europe	1992	Century Media	CD, LP, CS	7738
United States	1992	Century Media	CD, LP, CS	7738
United States	2004	Emetic Records	LP	N/A
United States	2006	Century Media	CD	8263
United States	2008	Emetic Records	2xLP	EME031
United States	2011	Emetic Records	2xLP	EME031
Europe	2015	Century Media	LP	CMD9985561

== Credits ==
- Mike IX Williams — vocals
- Mark Schultz — lead guitar
- Jimmy Bower — rhythm guitar
- Steve Dale — bass
- Joe LaCaze — drums
