= Take as Needed for Pain =

Studio album by Eyehategod
- Released: November 22, 1993
- Recorded: Studio 13, New Orleans
- Genre: Sludge metal
- Length: 49:34
- Label: Century Media
- Producer: Eyehategod

Eyehategod chronology
In the Name of Suffering (1990)	Take as Needed for Pain (1993)	Dopesick (1996)

Take as Needed for Pain is the second studio album by American sludge metal band Eyehategod, released on November 22, 1993. It was reissued in 2006 as part of Century Media's 20th Anniversary series of reissues, with six bonus tracks, taken from rare 7-inch records and splits.

== Background and recording ==
After being signed to Century Media in the early 1990s, the band began to self-record and produce their first album for the label, and second album total, in Studio 13. Studio 13 was a small recording studio located on the 13th floor of an abandoned department store located in New Orleans, about a few minutes away from where Mike IX Williams was living.

== Music ==
AllMusic stated that the album's sound is characterized by a "relentlessly bitter, broken-down mood. The intros to many tracks on the album incorporate audio feedback. Incorporating elements of blues, the album's guitar work has been described as "slow [and] sludgy," drawing comparisons to Black Sabbath. Chris Chantler of Metal Hammer described the instrumentation as "blackened blues riffing." The album also contains elements of Southern rock. The album's riffs have been described as "more distinguished and in some cases even catch[ier]" than on the band's previous album. The vocal performance of Mike IX Williams has been described as "indecipherable ranting," and has also been characterized as a "broken glass gargle."

According to Alex Deller of Metal Hammer, Take as Needed for Pain "sounds ramped up, kicked down and bugged out, towering over its predecessor in terms of sound and craft."

The album's lyrics pertain to "true-life squalor and struggle."

== Reception ==
Professional ratings
Review scores
Source	Rating
AllMusic	4/5 stars
Collector's Guide to Heavy Metal	7/10
The Encyclopedia of Popular Music	3/5 stars
Kerrang!	4/5 stars

Take as Needed for Pain has received praise since its 1993 release, and is considered by many as one of the band's best albums. According to Mike IX Williams, it was the favorite album of nearly all band members, and his favorite album title, with the exception of Poison Idea's Record Collectors Are Pretentious Assholes.

In 2009, the album was chosen as the number 1 sludge album by Terrorizer. The magazine commented:

"The essential sounds of Tony Iommi drowning in a bath full of whiskey and dirty needles, it might lack the 'hits' of its successor but as a catalyst for the movement, it's utterly essential."

In 2013, the song "White Nigger" was officially retitled "White Neighbor" during a rehearsal with Melvins drummer Dale Crover, who expressed discomfort with the song's original name.

In 2016, Metal Hammer named the album in their list "The 10 Essential Sludge Albums", stating the album "raised the bar". In 2017, Rolling Stone listed the album at No. 92 on its list of The 100 Greatest Metal Albums of All Time.

William York of AllMusic wrote: "Not counting the couple of looped spoken word collages, there isn't a whole lot to distinguish the tracks from one another. By the time it ends, the album just blurs into a big mound of corrosive, swampy doom metal riffage. But they sure do it well, and their conviction is hard to deny."

== Track listing ==
All lyrics are written by Mike IX Williams; all music is composed by Jimmy Bower, Joey LaCaze, Marc Schultz, Brian Patton & Mike Williams.

No.	Title	Length
1.	"Blank"	7:10
2.	"Sisterfucker (Part I)"	2:13
3.	"Shoplift"	3:17
4.	"White Nigger"	3:56
5.	"30$ Bag"	2:51
6.	"Disturbance"	7:01
7.	"Take as Needed for Pain"	6:09
8.	"Sisterfucker (Part II)"	2:39
9.	"Crimes Against Skin"	6:49
10.	"Kill Your Boss"	4:16
11.	"Who Gave Her the Roses"	2:00
12.	"Laugh It Off"	1:33
Total length:		49:54

2006 reissue bonus tracks
No.	Title	Length
13.	"Ruptured Heart Theory" (from the Bovine Records 7-inch Ruptured Heart Theory)	3:33
14.	"Story of the Eye" (from the Bovine Records 7-inch Ruptured Heart Theory)	2:30
15.	"Blank/Shoplift" (from the Bovine Records 7-inch Ruptured Heart Theory)	3:58
16.	"Southern Discomfort" (from the Slap-A-Ham Records split 7-inch with 16)	4:24
17.	"Serving Time in the Middle of Nowhere" (from the Ax/ction Records split 7-inch with 16)	3:20
18.	"Lack of Almost Everything" (from the Ax/ction Records split 7-inch with 16)	2:28
Total length:		69:48

== Personnel ==
Eyehategod

- Mike IX Williams – vocals
- Brian Patton – lead guitar
- Jimmy Bower – rhythm guitar
- Mark Schultz – bass
- Joey LaCaze – drums

Production

- Robinson Mills – engineer
- Perry Cunningham – remastering
- Tom Bejgrowicz – additional layout
- Charles Elliot – reissue coordination

== Release history ==
Region	Date	Label	Format	Catalog
United States	1993	Century Media	CD, CS	7752-2
United States	2004	Emetic Records	LP	N/A
United States	2006	Century Media	CD	8264-2
United States	2008	Emetic Records	2×LP	EME032
United States	2011	Emetic Records	2×LP	EME032
United States	2015	Century Media	LP	CMD9985571
Europe	2015	Century Media	LP	CMD9985571
