= Preaching the "End-Time" Message =

Compilation album by Eyehategod
- Released: May 2005
- Recorded: 1993 – 2002; March 10, 2005, at Mid-City Shank Studios, New Orleans, Louisiana
- Genre: Sludge metal
- Length: 39:36
- Label: Emetic

Eyehategod chronology
| 10 Years of Abuse (and Still Broke) (2001) | Preaching the "End-Time" Message (2005) | Eyehategod (2014) |

Professional ratings
Review scores
| Source | Rating |
|---|---|
| Allmusic | 3/5 stars |

Preaching the "End-Time" Message is a rarities collection by American sludge metal band Eyehategod, released in May 2005. It contains three original studio tracks, recorded on March 10, 2005, as well as live songs and rare alternate versions. The album is available on CD, vinyl LP and picture disc, although only 500 copies were made for vinyl or picture disc. The album is dedicated to Dimebag Darrell and Danielle Marie Smith (May 9, 1980- March 11, 2005)

== Track listing ==
All tracks are written by Eyehategod.

| No. | Title | Length |
|---|---|---|
| 1. | "Methamphetamine" (Alternate version from Cry Now, Cry Later Vol. 1 compilation, 1993) | 1:33 |
| 2. | "Serving Time in the Middle of Nowhere" (Alternate version from Gummo soundtrack, 1997) | 3:29 |
| 3. | "Sabbath Jam" (From In These Black Days: A Tribute to Black Sabbath Vol. 1, Eyehategod/Anal Cunt split 7-inch, 1997) | 6:05 |
| 4. | "Age of Bootcamps" (From They Lie to Hide the Truth/The Age of Bootcamp, Soilent Green/Eyehategod split 7-inch, 2002) | 5:33 |
| 5. | "I Am the Gestapo" (From I Am the Gestapo/Self-Zeroing, Eyehategod/Cripple Bastards split 7-inch, 2004) | 5:17 |
| 6. | "Jackass in the Will of God" (Live in Japan, March 19, 2002) | 2:50 |
| 7. | "Revolution/Revelation" (Live in Japan, March 19, 2002) | 4:29 |
| 8. | "36 Beers and a Ball of String" | 4:08 |
| 9. | "International Narcotic" | 1:36 |
| 10. | "Turn Troubled Tables" | 4:36 |
| Total length: | | 39:36 |

The concert tracks 6 and 7 are taken from the Live in Tokyo DVD (Club Quattro, Tokyo, Japan, March 19, 2002).
