= Eyehategod =

American sludge metal band

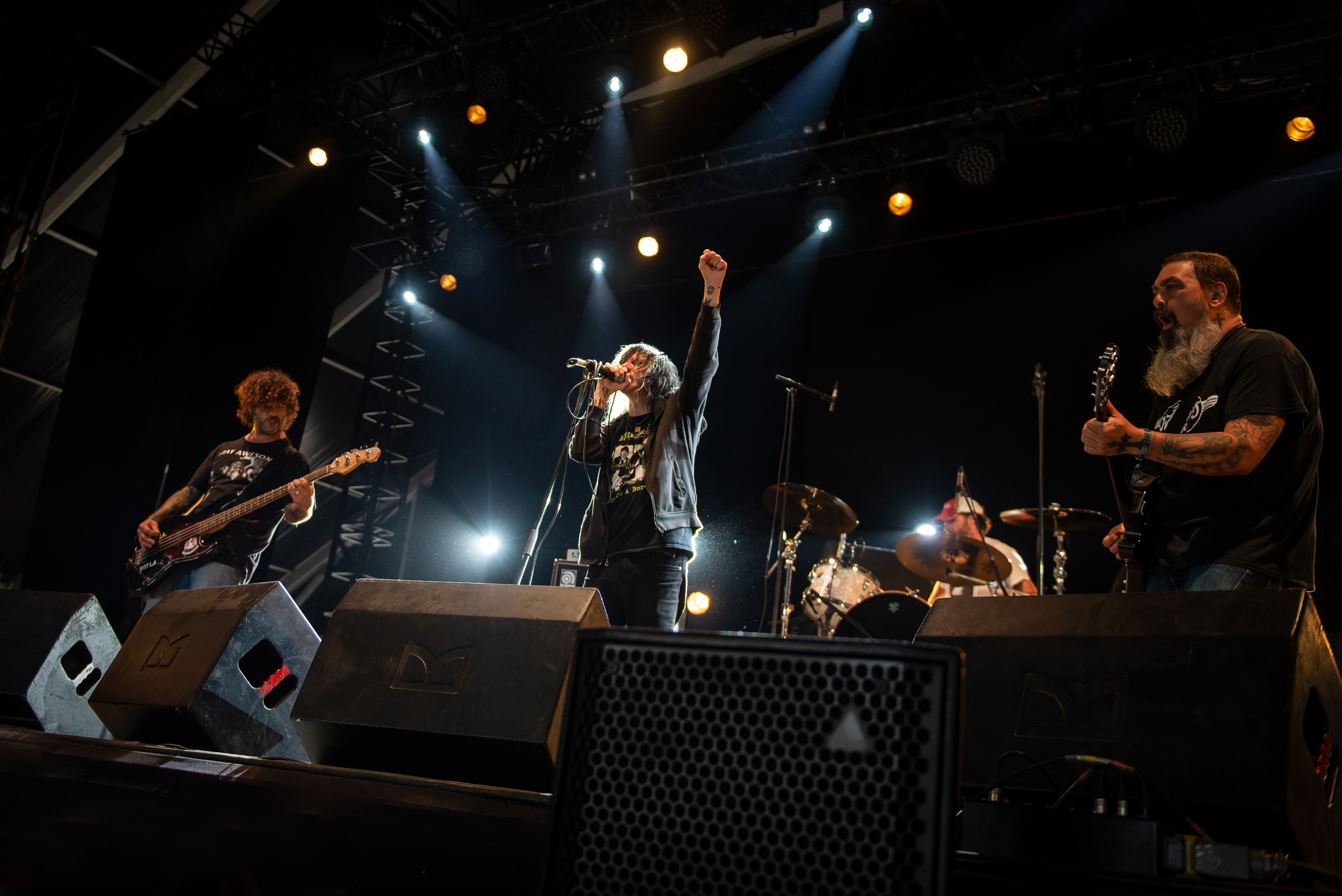
- Eyehategod at Hellfest 2022

Background information
- Origin: New Orleans, Louisiana, U.S.
- Genres: Sludge metal
- Years active: 1988–present
- Labels: Century Media; Emetic; Housecore
- Members: Jimmy Bower; Mike Williams; Gary Mader; Aaron Hill
- Past members: Joey LaCaze; Brian Patton; Steve Dale; Mark Schultz; Vince LeBlanc; Daniel Nick
- Website: eyehategod.ee

Eyehategod is an American sludge metal band from New Orleans, Louisiana, who formed in 1988. Their core lineup has remained consistent since the band's inception, with the exception of the bassist (the role of which has been filled by several musicians over the years), until the death of drummer Joey LaCaze in 2013. As of 2026, the band has released six studio albums.

The band were friends with grindcore group Anal Cunt and performed with them for the first show after their frontman Seth Putnam was revived from his 2004 coma. Putnam had previously filled in for Mike Williams at a show in New Orleans during Mardi Gras in 1996. Williams was out of town at the time.

== History ==
=== Formation, demos and first two albums (1988–1995) ===
Jimmy Bower and Joey LaCaze founded the band on April 20, 1988 (in accordance with 4/20 in cannabis culture), and they recruited Mark Schultz, Steve Dale and vocalist Chris Hilliard. Hilliard would later leave the group early on, and would be replaced by Mike Williams. The band then recorded two demos: Garden Dwarf Woman Driver (1989) and Lack of Almost Everything (1990); the latter was sent out to various labels. They eventually got signed to the small French label Intellectual Convulsion, and released their first album In the Name of Suffering in 1990. The album had a far more primitive and raw sound than later releases (as it was recorded by the inexperienced band members for only $1,000), and had a more hardcore feel to it. The label dissolved with only a couple of thousand copies having been printed, so the band had to find a new label. They soon signed with Century Media however, who re-released In the Name of Suffering on December 1, 1992, as it is known today. Also in 2006, In the Name of Suffering was re-issued with four bonus tracks. These four tracks were the same as those on the original demo Lack of Almost Everything.

Eyehategod then went on to record Take as Needed for Pain in 1993, with new bassist Mark Schultz who had also contributed on In the Name of Suffering. The album was recorded at Studio 13, a small recording studio working from the 13th floor of an abandoned department store on Canal Street in New Orleans. The band played daily during this period to put down tracks for the album. At the time, Mike Williams was homeless (having been thrown out by his former girlfriend) and living in an abandoned, flea-infested room above a strip club just a few minutes away from the studio. The sound of Take as Needed for Pain seemed much closer to what the members intended than the material on In the Name of Suffering, and it shows a cleaner, more distinct sound with better defined riffs. The southern rock, blues, and doom influences are also more distinctly felt on this album. After the release of the album, the band toured extensively with acts such as Chaos UK, Buzzov*en, White Zombie and Corrosion of Conformity. After touring, the band members briefly spread out in different directions. Mike Williams busied himself contributing to Metal Maniacs magazine. Jimmy Bower played drums on Crowbar's Broken Glass as well as Down's debut album, NOLA. Brian Patton recorded Soilent Green's debut album, Pussysoul.

=== Dopesick and Confederacy of Ruined Lives (1995–2000) ===
The band had been recording several demos, which were released on various seven-inch records and splits on various labels, but finally in 1995 settled down to record an album, with Pepper Keenan of Corrosion of Conformity as producer, and new bassist Vince LeBlanc, which would be named Dopesick. At the time, Mike Williams was living in Clinton Hill, Brooklyn in New York City, and so had to travel between there and New Orleans frequently for the recording sessions. The recording sessions were infamously chaotic, and involved the studio owner reportedly calling Century to ask if the band were insane, and threatening to kick them out. This particular incident occurred after Mike Williams had attempted to record the sound of smashing glass for the introduction to the album, by smashing a bottle on the floor of the studio. In the process he slashed his hand open badly and bled all over the studio floor (this recording did make it to the record as the introduction to the first track, "My Name is God (I Hate You)"). One of the band members then apparently smeared the words "Hell" and "Death to Pigs" in Mike's blood. Brian Patton and Joey LaCaze then flew out to San Francisco to mix the album. This album was far more chaotic than their previous, but still retained the distinct southern, bluesy feel, distancing it from In the Name of Suffering. The band then embarked on a US tour in the spring of 1996 to support the album, supporting White Zombie and Pantera, bringing their music to a far wider audience, raising the profile of sludge metal, and becoming (in)famous as one of its founding acts.

Eyehategod then went through a period of internal disputes, and went on unofficial hiatus as its members scattered again to record and tour with their various side-projects; namely Soilent Green, Corrosion of Conformity and Crowbar. Eventually, in 2000, the band reconvened (again with a new bassist, this time Daniel Nick) to compile their various Take as Needed for Pain and Dopesick era singles, seven inches and split records into one record, Southern Discomfort. This reconvention gave them the impetus to knuckle down and record another album, and that album was 2000's Confederacy of Ruined Lives. The album was a much more polished, sober affair, and so sounded distinctly more like a sequel to Take as Needed for Pain than Dopesick. After its release, the band then toured extensively, embarking on a world tour for the first time, with dates in Europe and Japan.

=== Subsequent activities (2001–2013) ===
By 2001, the members of Eyehategod had continued juggling with various side-projects. During this time, Down recorded their second album, and Bower formed the mostly instrumental band, The Mystick Krewe of Clearlight, as well as Soilent Green releasing their third album. Mike Williams also founded Outlaw Order and Arson Anthem. During all this activity, Eyehategod found time to compile and release their live album 10 Years of Abuse (and Still Broke) (which was mainly released due to a contractual obligation with Century Media), and record and release yet more split records and 7 inches. With the release of their live album, the band were free of their contract with Century, and chose to sign to Emetic Records (with their fifth and current bassist, Gary Mader) for the release of their 2005 stop-gap compilation album, Preaching the "End-Time" Message, much in the vein of Southern Discomfort, but this time with some unreleased studio tracks.

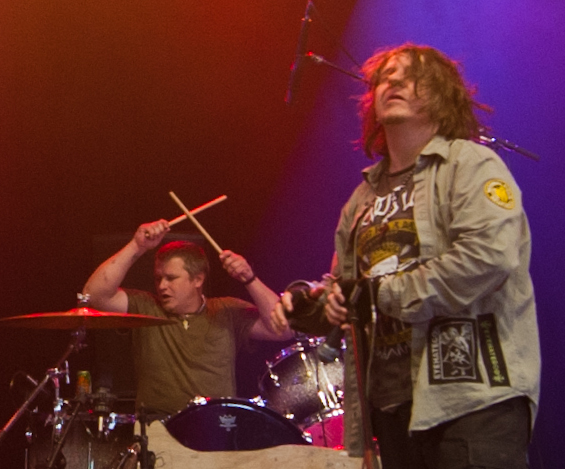
Former drummer Joey LaCaze and vocalist Mike Williams in 2011

Following the aftermath of Hurricane Katrina, singer Mike Williams and his ex-girlfriend Alicia Morgan (a member of sludge metal band, 13) were arrested in Morgan City, Louisiana on a narcotics charge. Williams spent 91 days in the Morgan City Jail, and kicked his heroin habit.

With the help of his Eyehategod bandmates and supporters such as Phil Anselmo, Williams was released from jail on December 2, 2005. The band played a set at the 2006 Mardi Gras festival, the first since the disaster. Emetic Records released a various artists tribute album to Eyehategod on March 20, 2007, titled For the Sick. On August 29, 2008, the band celebrated their 20-year anniversary with a show at One Eyed Jacks in New Orleans. The band played a few shows in the American South in May 2009, and are on tour the same winter. They also performed at Hellfest in France in June.

Jimmy Bower announced in an interview that Eyehategod are still active and preparing a new album. The band played at the Inferno festival in Oslo, Norway, on April 1, 2010, and also played two sets at the Roadburn festival later that month. Eyehategod performed a new song called "New Orleans Is the New Vietnam" during their set at their July 1, 2011 show in Roskilde Festival, Denmark.

In 2012, the band played at the A389 Bash music festival, an annual event organized by Pulling Teeth guitarist Domenic Romeo.

Drummer Joey LaCaze died on August 23, 2013, from respiratory failure. Earsplit PR issued a press release on the life and death of LaCaze. The release states, "Doctors confirmed to family members that the cause of death was respiratory failure. He also suffered from long term asthma." He had recently come back from a European tour and had celebrated his 42nd birthday.

On October 31, 2013, the band announced that Aaron Hill would be taking LaCaze's place as drummer.

=== Eyehategod, A History of Nomadic Behavior and next album (2014–present) ===
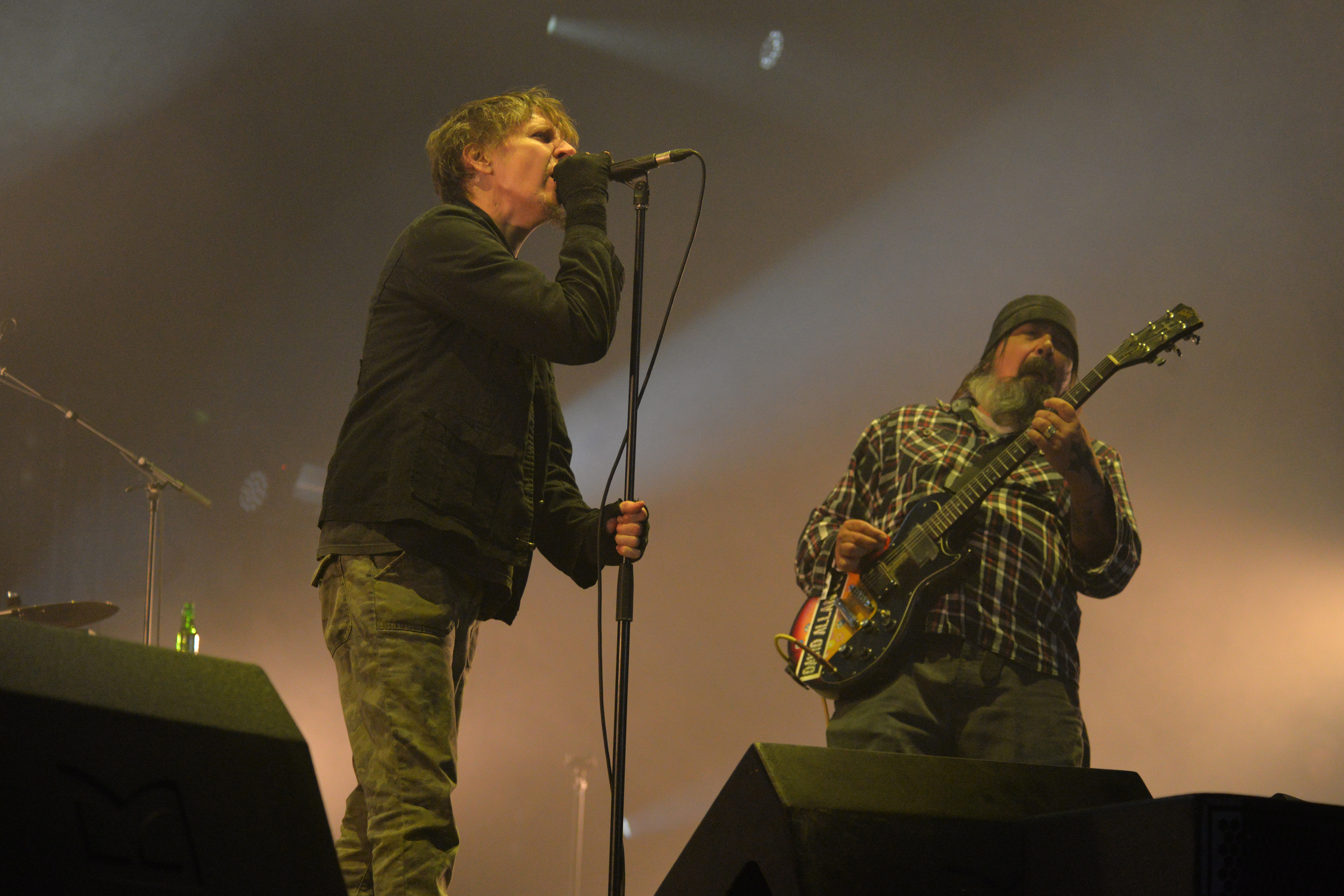
Mike Williams (left) and Jimmy Bower performing at Hellfest 2018

In May 2014, the band released a self-titled full-length album on Phil Anselmo's label Housecore Records. This album is the last featuring Joey LaCaze on drums.

On August 4, 2016, Williams announced Anselmo would be filling in for him at a show in New Orleans and the 7th annual GwarBBQ. Williams cited "serious health issues" that prevented him from being physically able to perform.

On September 22, 2016, Earsplit PR announced that Randy Blythe of Lamb of God would be filling in for Williams for the entire duration of the following month's tour with Discharge and Toxic Holocaust.

On December 16, 2016, Williams underwent liver transplant surgery.

By July 2018, Eyehategod had begun working on their sixth studio album, which was initially planned to be released in 2019. The band announced on their Facebook page on October 14, 2020, that the album was finished. Two months later, A History of Nomadic Behavior was revealed as the title of the new album, which was released on March 12, 2021.

In July 2024, Williams confirmed that Eyehategod has begun working on new material for their seventh studio album. The band performed at Milwaukee Metal Fest in 2025. They will tour with Crowbar in 2026.

== Outlaw Order ==
While Jimmy Bower was busy playing drums for Down, the other four members of Eyehategod formed a side-project called Outlaw Order (abbreviated to OO%). The band released a limited edition 7" EP in 2003 called Legalize Crime, which has since been re-released on CD with a bonus live track and is available through Eyehategod's webstore. The criminal theme is apparently because at the time of the band's formation all five of the members were on probation, and have consistently been in trouble with the law. Mark Shultz is currently serving a prison sentence and so has been replaced by Justin Grisoli.

The band released their debut album, Dragging Down the Enforcer, on November 10, 2008.

== Artistry ==
=== Musical style and influences ===
Eyehategod are a sludge metal band, incorporating heavy, detuned guitar riffs, walls of feedback, and "tortured" vocals. James Christopher Monger of AllMusic described the band's sound as "an ugly and uncompromising blend of doomy, blues-y punk, and misanthropic metal," as well as a "combin[ation of] hardcore brutality, narcotized slowness, and Southern rock." The band's music also makes frequent use of atonality. Alex Deller of Metal Hammer described it as "the sound of hardscrabble survival set to music." The band's sound is further characterized by "Sabbath-blasted hardcore riffs." In response to an apparent notion conceived by Rob Zombie that "all the good riffs have already been played by Black Sabbath", Mike IX Williams responded: "He’s probably right. But you can always switch all that stuff around. It depends on the atmosphere, who’s playing it, the guitar sound…there’s a lot of [factors] like that."

In addition to Black Sabbath, Eyehategod have noted Melvins, Carnivore, The Obsessed, Discharge, Black Flag, Corrosion of Conformity, Celtic Frost, Confessor, and Saint Vitus as key influences to their sound.

=== Lyrical themes ===
The band's lyrical themes are primarily focused on substance abuse. According to guitarist Jimmy Bower, "Alot [sic] of people in the New Orleans metal scene did heroin and other narcotics. I did all that. I'm not proud of it. There's nothing to glorify about it. I lost my girlfriend to that shit. And I buried a lot of friends." In the 2020 book Raising Hell, vocalist Mike IX Williams was quoted saying: "It's pretty well known that we've all had our little drug problems. I've missed shows. I was totally addicted, and I was dope sick because I couldn't get any drugs for whatever reason. That's all in the past, but man, there are so many different stories, and there are so many times the band was just a huge felony rolling down the highway. We were always in danger of getting pulled over with the stuff we had on us. Guys were shooting up and doing coke. There was paraphernalia and drugs and methodone and Xanax and pretty much anything you can imagine going through the van. We knew that it was terrible, but we felt like it was a necessity. That's how we wanted to do it. It was a stupid ideal that some young bands have. I look back and cringe at all the things we did that were illegal or dangerous, and I thank somebody – knock on wood – that nothing ever happened."

Despite the band's name, Williams has attempted to distance the band from the Satanic and occult themes and ideologies common within heavy metal and its more extreme offshoots. In the 2020 book Raising Hell, he was quoted saying: "Some people just think we're gonna be all Satanic and evil and loud. Really, we're just loud. I've met a fair number of people in the underground who are into worshipping the devil. That's silly to me. It's just as silly as somebody worshipping God. It's pointless."

== Legacy ==
Eyehategod are now considered pioneers of what is considered sludge metal. According to Alex Deller of Metal Hammer: "Eyehategod were one of the earliest bands to peddle the [sludge] style, setting the bar for all who followed with mangled blues riffs, atonal thumps and the relentless mosquito whine of feedback, all capped by vocalist Mike IX Williams' signature slur n' howl. [...] a difficult and uncomfortable listen, but one that is undeniably rewarding."

== Members ==
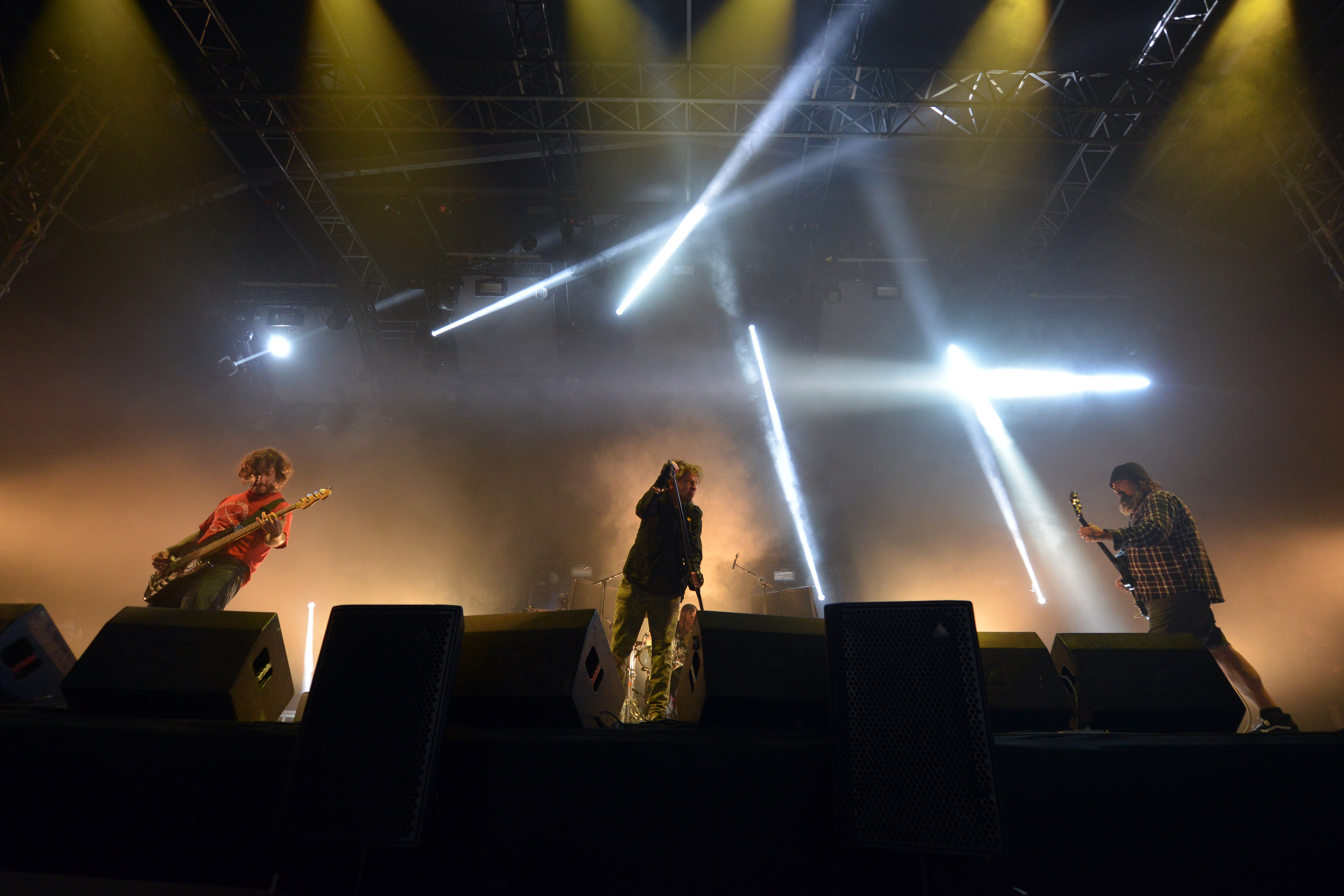
The band at Hellfest 2018

Current

- Jimmy Bower – rhythm guitar (1988–present); lead guitar (2018–present)
- Mike Williams – vocals (1988–present)
- Gary Mader – bass (2002–present)
- Aaron Hill – drums (2013–present)

Former

- Chris Hillard – vocals (1988)
- Joey LaCaze – drums (1988–2013; died 2013)
- Steve Dale – bass (1988–1992)
- Mark Schultz – lead guitar (1988–1992), bass (1992–1995)
- Brian Patton – lead guitar (1993–2018, substitute in 2019 and 2022)
- Vince LeBlanc – bass (1996–1999)
- Daniel Nick – bass (2000–2001)

== Discography ==
Studio albums

- In the Name of Suffering (1990)
- Take as Needed for Pain (1993)
- Dopesick (1996)
- Confederacy of Ruined Lives (2000)
- Eyehategod (2014)
- A History of Nomadic Behavior (2021)

== See also ==
- Music of New Orleans
