= Mike IX Williams =

American vocalist

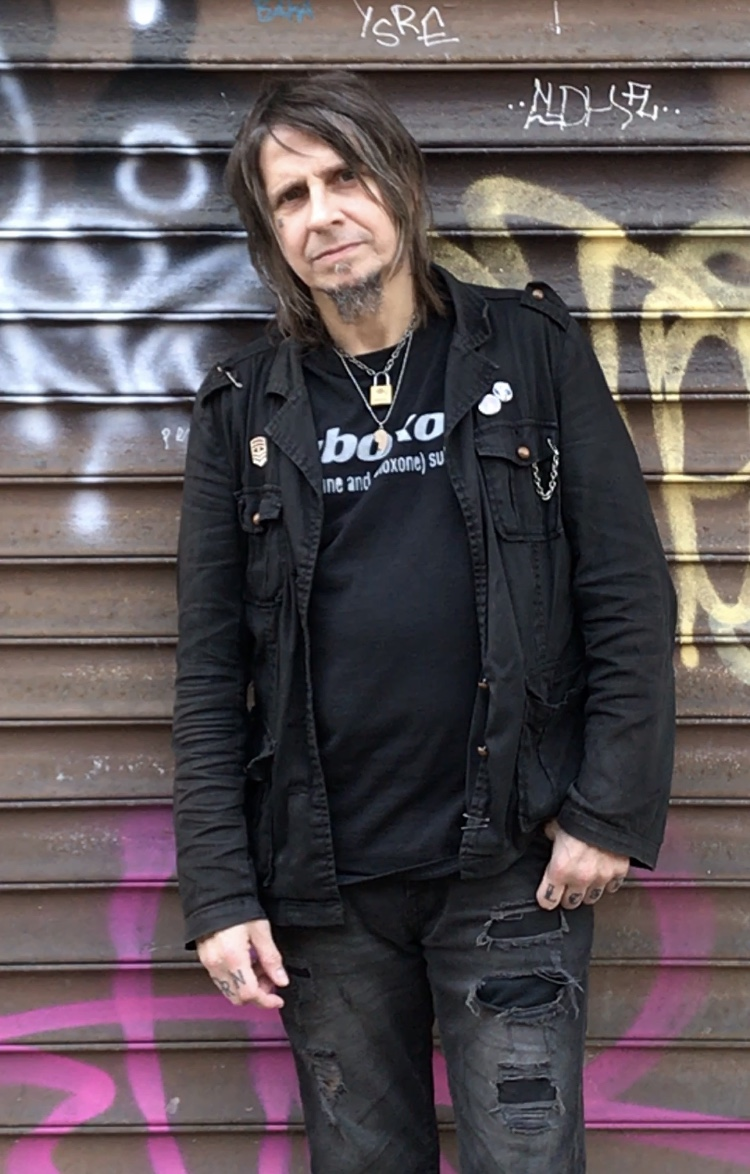
- Williams in 2019

Background information
- Also known as: Mike Williams; Mike IX
- Born: Michael D. Williams; High Point, North Carolina, U.S.
- Origin: New Orleans, Louisiana, U.S.
- Genres: Sludge metal; hardcore punk; industrial
- Occupations: Singer; songwriter
- Years active: 1982–present
- Member of: Eyehategod; Outlaw Order; The Guilt Of...; Corrections House
- Formerly of: Arson Anthem

Michael D. Williams, known professionally as Mike IX Williams (pronounced "Mike 'Nine' Williams"), is an American vocalist and songwriter, best known as the lead singer of New Orleans–based sludge metal band Eyehategod. He is the former associate editor of heavy metal magazine Metal Maniacs and has also worked on other projects.

Williams' vocal offerings have been characterized as "tortured laryngitis screams."

== Early life ==
Williams was born in High Point, North Carolina. His parents died when he was a child. At the age of 15, he left home. During most part of his life he has lived in New Orleans, Louisiana, but he also lived some time in New York City. He began attending punk rock shows and using drugs at this age. He recalled: "Yeah, man; I was a teenager back in the old days, going to see Black Flag, Misfits, Minor Threat, Dead Kennedys, that was my teenage years, doing all that stuff. The wild stuff came with that. That was back in the ’80s."

== Eyehategod ==
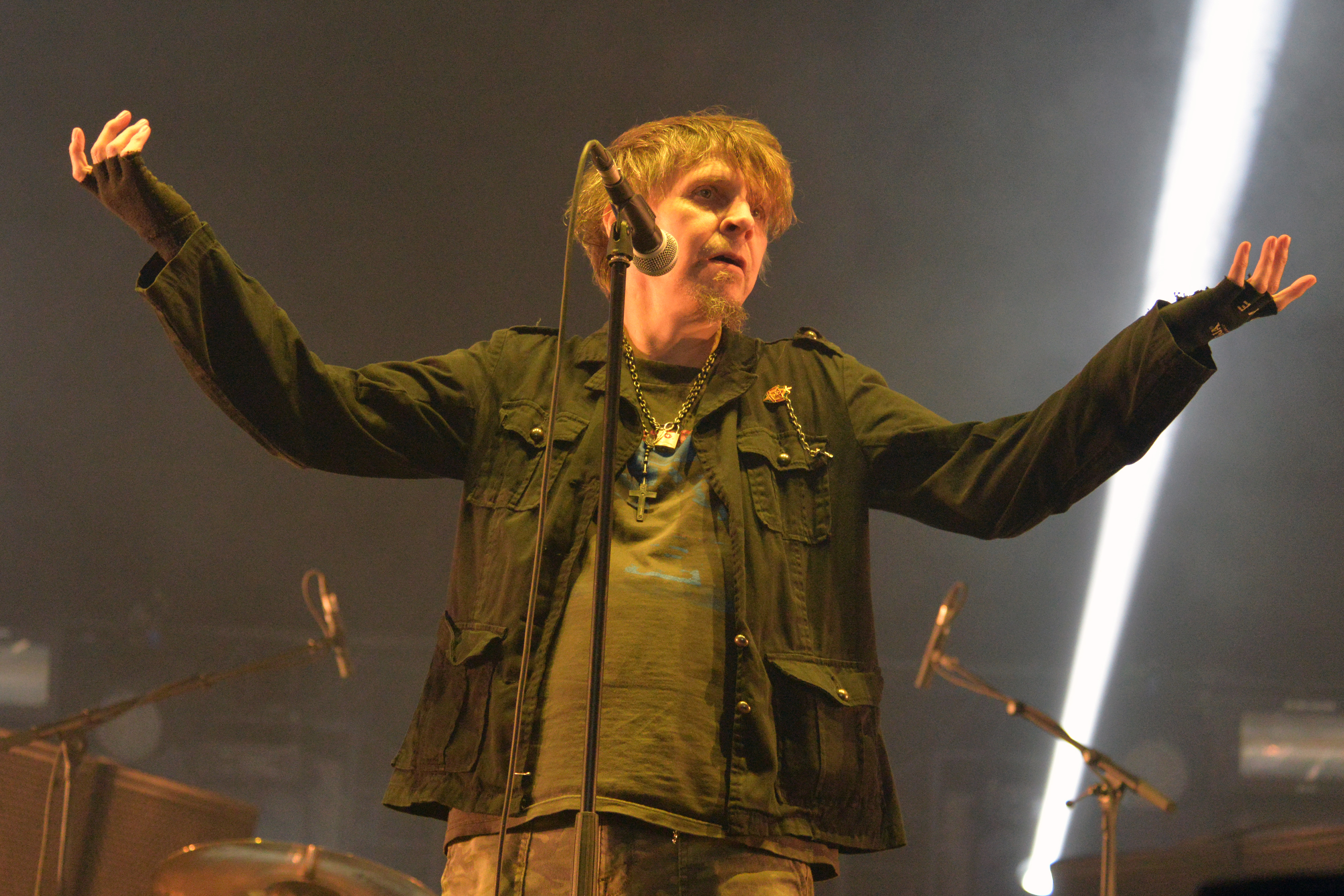
Williams performing with Eyehategod at Hellfest 2018

Williams was invited to join Eyehategod by Jimmy Bower in 1988. Since then, all of the band's albums have featured his vocals which have been described as "tortured laryngitis screams", an "indecipherable ranting", and "the utmost sickening, puke-ridden audio atrocities that could actually prove deadly if taken in large doses".

For the recording of Dopesick, Eyehategod's third album, Williams went through several issues. At the time, he was living in Clinton Hill, Brooklyn in New York City so he had to travel between there and New Orleans, Louisiana frequently for the recording sessions, which took place at Side One Studios. He attempted to record the sound of smashing glass for the introduction to the album, by smashing a bottle on the floor of the studio. In the process, Williams slashed his hand open badly and bled all over the studio floor. One of the band members then apparently smeared the words "Hell" and "Death to Pigs" in his blood. The studio owner reportedly called Century Media to ask if the band were insane, and threatened to kick them out because of this.

Williams is solely responsible for the band's lyrics and themes, maintaining a collection of pre-written lyrics that he selects to complement the compositions of his bandmates in Eyehategod. His lyrics never try to portray anything, they never have a story attached to them. Sometimes he works with the musical atmosphere created by his bandmates.

== Other projects ==
During his first years as an Eyehategod member, Williams was in two other bands: Drip, a sludge metal band, which also featured fellow Eyehategod band members Jimmy Bower and Brian Patton, and Crawlspace.

In 2006, he began a hardcore punk band along with Phil Anselmo named Arson Anthem, in which he is the vocalist. Williams stated in 2008 that his desire with this band is to make people explore early hardcore punk.

Along with all Eyehategod members except Jimmy Bower, Williams formed Outlaw Order, another sludge metal band, where he provides vocals for the band.

In 2005, Williams' first book, Cancer as a Social Activity, was released. The book includes old lyrics and portions of collages that Williams assembled for Eyehategod which date back as far as 1988 as well as unreleased stuff, written during the period of two or three years before the release of the book. The book also shows Eyehategod's history. It was mostly written in New Orleans and New York City but there are also part which were written while he was traveling.

Early 2013 saw the emergence of Corrections House, an industrial project involving Williams plus members of Neurosis, Nachtmystium, and Yakuza.

In 2004, Williams and longtime friend Seth Putnam of the band Anal Cunt had plans to start a band and write a record consisting of all anti-cop songs. It is currently unknown if any material was written or recorded.

Williams used to be the associate editor of Metal Maniacs.

== Personal life ==
Williams suffers from chronic asthma.

=== Hurricane Katrina and jail ===
When Hurricane Katrina hit New Orleans on August 29, 2005, Williams was at his home in the Lower Garden District with his then-girlfriend. About eight hours after the beginning of the storm, the power went out. By listening to battery powered radio announcements they were able to find out that the situation in New Orleans was quite bad. After the hurricane passed, the water in Williams' neighborhood subsided. At this time, violence and crime in the area became rampant and the police were not in a position to help the residents. Williams recalled, "There was a dead body round the corner from me. I saw someone pulling an ATM down the street, chained to the bumper of their car. Things got pretty hectic."

In the 2020 book Raising Hell: Backstage Tales from the Lives of Metal Legends, Williams stated he looted a pharmacy after the hurricane and "didn't get busted until three days later".

Inside the apartment they could hear gunshots and at one time, upon leaving the building, Williams' partner was confronted by a person who attempted to rob her. Williams intervened on her behalf. In order to escape the violence, Williams and his partner slept at the apartment of a friend. The following morning they borrowed a car and traveled to Morgan City, Louisiana, where Williams received word that his house had burned down.

They booked a hotel room in Morgan City. Apparently, the person who attended them could see they were from New Orleans because they had to show their identity document; for unknown reasons this person contacted the police. Members of the police entered Williams's room and arrested him.

Williams was convicted of drug possession and jailed. Bail was set at $150,000; an amount Williams was unable to afford. With help from his lawyer, Williams filed for a bond reduction which was rejected by the court on the grounds that Williams was a threat to society. Williams was anxious at this time as his friends and associates were unaware that he was in jail. A fund to help to free Williams was created and his bandmates encouraged fans to send letters to him while he was in jail. Williams recounted that his experience in jail was punitive in nature rather than rehabilitative; he expressed his belief that prison employees are sadists, and was quoted saying, "I think they like to hurt other people and like to see other people’s misery." Later, Phil Anselmo paid the bail money to have Williams released. Upon his release, Williams spent several months staying at Anselmo's home.

=== Drug addiction ===
The ’90s were one thing where we lived for the day and didn’t care what happened. You saw us then, so you know how that was. But then you finally get older and you reach that day where you realise, ‘Wow! This may actually be killing me.’ It made me think. After three months in there it was quite a shock to be out of hospital. There were still a lot of steps for me to take so it wasn’t like an immediate thing where I was back out on the street jumping up and down. Having said that, four months after the surgery we were back onstage.

— On his liver transplant, as quoted by Phil Alexander of Kerrang! (March 26, 2021)

Williams struggled with drug addiction before Hurricane Katrina. He recalled, "When I moved to New York in the early 90s, heroin was everywhere, so of course I wanted to try it, It was partly me thinking, ‘Yeah, I’ve got this under control’ but at the same time not really caring what happened. Not wanting to die – that probably came later in my life – but just not worrying about tomorrow." By the time the hurricane hit, he had stopped using heroin and was in a methadone program. During his stay in jail he did not receive the substance and underwent severe withdrawal which resulted in not being able to sleep for about seven days. He hardly ate for six days; he just soaked the bread from lunch in water and swallowed it because he knew he needed to keep something down. After this, he was able to break his addiction to opiates. Jimmy Bower stated in an interview that Williams inspired him to also kick opiates.

Although he no longer uses opiates, Williams has a long history of alcoholism that persists to this day. His excessive drinking eventually led to health problems, which resulted in him requiring a liver transplant. In 2016, Williams' wife set up a crowdfund so fans could help pay for the transplant expenses. The funding goal was later achieved, and Williams successfully underwent the surgery in December. He recalled the situation in 2021, where he was quoted saying: "I was a goner. I’m quite pragmatic so I just said to myself, ‘This could be it. I could be gone soon.’ I wasn’t really scared at all. I just thought, ‘If I go, I go, and if I stay, I stay.’ And I was great with staying, you know!"
