= All We Want =

2002 EP by H2O

EP by H_{2}O
- Released: October 29, 2002
- Recorded: August & September 2002 at BearTracks Recording Studio in Suffern, New York
- Genre: Punk rock, pop punk
- Length: 17:07
- Label: MCA
- Producer: Tracks 1–3: Eddie Wohl, Steve Regina, Rob Caggiano; Tracks 4, 5: None

H_{2}O chronology
Go (2001)	All We Want (2002)	Nothing to Prove (2008)

All We Want is an EP released by H_{2}O. It was released on October 29, 2002. It includes three previously unreleased tracks, two live versions of songs from the album Go and the music video for the song "Role Model".

== Track listing ==
All songs by Todd Morse unless otherwise noted.

1. "All We Want"
2. "Static"
3. "Wrong"
4. "Role Model (Live at CBGB's)"
5. "Memory Lane (Live at CBGB's)" (Rusty Pistachio)

== Personnel ==
- Toby Morse – vocals
- Todd Morse – guitar, backing vocals
- Rusty Pistachio – guitar, backing vocals
- Adam Blake – bass, backing vocals
- Todd Friend – drums, backing vocals
