= Disobedient (album) =

Studio album by Stick to Your Guns
- Released: February 10, 2015
- Recorded: February 5–March 12, 2014
- Genre: Metalcore, melodic hardcore
- Length: 31:04
- Label: Sumerian
- Producer: John Feldmann

Stick to Your Guns chronology
Diamond (2012)	Disobedient (2015)	True View (2016)

Singles from Disobedient
- 1. "Nobody" Released: November 3, 2014; 2. "What Choice Did You Give Us?" Released: December 9, 2014

Disobedient is the fifth full-length studio album by American melodic hardcore band Stick to Your Guns, released on February 10, 2015. It is the band's first album to be produced by John Feldmann (The Used, Escape the Fate, Beartooth). This is the band's last release on Sumerian Records.

On October 21, 2014, the band released the first single off the album, "Nobody", with the music video premiering on Alternative Press.

The album was included at number 16 on Rock Sound's top 50 releases of 2015 list.

== Track listing ==
No.	Title	Length
1.	"It Starts With Me"	2:31
2.	"What Choice Did You Give Us?"	2:55
3.	"Nobody"	3:05
4.	"RMA (Revolutionary Mental Attitude)" (featuring Toby Morse of H_{2}O)	1:28
5.	"Nothing You Can Do to Me" (featuring Walter Delgado)	2:22
6.	"To Whom It May Concern"	3:17
7.	"The Crown"	3:30
8.	"I Choose Nothing" (featuring Scott Vogel of Terror)	3:15
9.	"Disobedient"	1:04
10.	"The War Inside"	3:02
11.	"Left You Behind"	4:29
Total length:		31:04

Deluxe Edition
No.	Title	Length
12.	"Every Second"	1:42
13.	"The Crown" (Acoustic)	3:24
14.	"Nothing You Can Do to Me" (Acoustic)	2:32

== Personnel ==
Stick to Your Guns

- Jesse Barnett – lead vocals, additional guitars, piano
- Josh James – lead guitar, backing vocals
- Chris Rawson – rhythm guitar, backing vocals
- Andrew Rose – bass, backing vocals
- George Schmitz – drums

Guest musicians

- Toby Morse (of H_{2}O) – vocals on "RMA (Revolutionary Mental Attitude)"
- Scott Vogel (of Terror) – vocals on "I Choose Nothing"
- Walter Delgado (of Rotting Out) – vocals on "Nothing You Can Do to Me"
