= Use Your Voice =

Use Your Voice may refer to:

- Use Your Voice (Mason Jennings album), 2004
- Use Your Voice (H2O album), 2015
