= Can't Get Off the Phone =

1996 EP by H2O

Can't Get Off The Phone EP

EP by H_{2}O
- Released: 1996
- Genre: Punk rock
- Label: Orphaned Records

Can't Get off the Phone EP is the title of the Ophaned Records EP released by H_{2}O.

== Side A ==
1. "Phone Song"
2. "Salad Days (Minor Threat Cover)"

== Side B ==
1. "Bad Boys"
2. "Smokeys Last Supper"

== Personnel ==
- Toby Morse – vocals
- Todd Morse – guitar
- Rusty Pistachio – guitar
- Eric Rice – bass
- Todd Friend – drums
- Mastered by Vicor Luke
- Produced By Dean Rispler
