= Braindead (Papa Roach song) =

2025 single by Papa Roach featuring Toby Morse

Single by Papa Roach featuring Toby Morse
- Released: June 25, 2025
- Genre: Rap metal
- Length: 3:11
- Label: New Noize
- Songwriters: Jacoby Shaddix; Colin Brittain; Tobin Esperance; Anthony Esperance; Toby Morse; lil aaron
- Producers: Papa Roach; Brittain

Papa Roach singles chronology
"Even If It Kills Me" (2025)	"Braindead" (2025)	"Wake Up Calling" (2026)

Music video
- "Braindead" on YouTube

"Braindead" is a single by American rock band Papa Roach featuring guest vocals from Toby Morse of the hardcore punk band H_{2}O. It reached No. 1 on the Billboard Mainstream Rock Airplay chart in October 2025.

== Background ==
The single was released on June 25, 2025. It followed a UK tour including a performance at Wembley Arena and cover features in Kerrang! and Metal Hammer. It was released alongside a lyric video, with the band later announcing that a full music video would follow in July 2025. The song is set to appear on the band's upcoming album. The track features Morse, and frontman Jacoby Shaddix stated that Morse's contribution took the song "to the next level". Morse commented on Shaddix's sobriety and stated that the collaboration aligned with the band's long-running "one life, one chance" philosophy.

== Composition and lyrics ==
According to Blabbermouth, the song mixes Papa Roach's usual energetic rock sound with the punk-style energy contributed by Morse. Shaddix described the song as urgent and direct, and stating it was intended as a call to wake up before it's too late. He and Morse both connected the song's message to the band's long-standing "one life, one chance" philosophy.

== Music video ==
The original music video premiered on August 1, 2025. It depicts Shaddix confined in an institution under restraint, intercut with the band performing in a padded cell. Morse appears for a cameo, which he described as his first acting experience. It was co-directed by Jesse Davey and Ed Sheers.

A narrative version of the music video was released on October 31, 2025.

== Track listing ==
All tracks are written by Jacoby Shaddix, Tobin Esperance, Anthony Esperance, including additional noted.

BRAINDEAD (feat. Toby Morse) - by Papa Roach Single
No.	Title	Writer(s)	Length
1.	"Braindead (feat. Toby Morse)" (Explicit)	Toby Morse; Colin Brittain	3:11
2.	"Even If It Kills Me"	Drew Fulk; Andrew Goldstein	3:32
3.	"Even If It Kills Me (Reimagined)"	Fulk; Goldstein	2:54
Total length:			9:38

Notes

- Track 1 is stylized in all caps.

== Chart performance ==
It reached No. 1 on the Billboard Mainstream Rock Airplay chart on October 4, 2025, their twelfth song to do so. For Morse, it's his first No. 1 appearance on a Billboard chart as a solo artist.

According to Loudwire, the song was among the 25 most-played songs on rock radio in 2025.

== Personnel ==
Credits adapted from Apple Music.

Papa Roach

- Jacoby Shaddix – lead vocals, songwriter
- Jerry Horton – guitar
- Tobin Esperance – bass, songwriter
- Tony Palermo – drums

Additional musicians

- Toby Morse – guest vocals, songwriter
- Anthony Esperance – guitar, songwriter

Additional credits

- lil aaron – songwriter
- Papa Roach – producer
- Colin Brittain – producer, songwriter
- Kevin McCombs – engineer
- Neal Avron – mixing engineer
- Emerson Mancini – mastering engineer

== Charts ==
=== Weekly charts ===
Weekly chart performance for "Braindead"
Chart (2025)	Peak position
Germany Airplay (TopHit)	63
US Rock & Alternative Airplay (Billboard)	7
US Mainstream Rock Airplay (Billboard)	1

=== Year-end charts ===
Year-end chart performance for "Braindead"
Chart (2025)	Position
US Mainstream Rock Airplay (Billboard)	37
