= Don't Forget Your Roots =

Don't Forget Your Roots may refer to:

- "Don't Forget Your Roots" (song), a 2011 song by Six60
- Don't Forget Your Roots (album), a 2011 album by H2O
