= Nothing to Prove (H2O album) =

2008 studio album by H2O

Studio album by H_{2}O
- Released: May 27, 2008
- Recorded: January 2008
- Genre: Punk rock
- Label: Bridge 9 Records
- Producer: Chad Gilbert

H_{2}O chronology
All We Want (2002)	Nothing to Prove (2008)	Don't Forget Your Roots (2011)

Professional ratings
Review scores
Source	Rating
AbsolutePunk.net	82% link
AllMusic	link

Nothing to Prove is the fifth studio album by American punk rock band H_{2}O. It was released on May 27, 2008, through Bridge 9 Records. It is the band's first album since 2001's Go, and the first new material since their 2002 EP All We Want. The album hit at #7 on Billboard Top Heatseekers on June 14, 2008.

Toby Morse's son Maximus is featured throughout the album, providing intros/outros to many of the songs.

== Track listing ==
No.	Title	Length
1.	"1995"	2:34
2.	"Nothing to Prove"	1:21
3.	"Sunday"	2:59
4.	"A Thin Line"	2:05
5.	"Unconditional"	2:34
6.	"Still Here"	1:53
7.	"Fairweather Friend"	2:23
8.	"Heart on My Sleeve"	2:11
9.	"Mitts"	2:42
10.	"What Happened?"	2:53
Total length:		23:35

Notes

The track "Mitts" is a reworked version of the songs "Static", which appeared on their 2002 EP All We Want. The band produced a video for "What Happened" featuring actor Michael Rapaport and musicians Matt Skiba and Lou Koller.

== Personnel ==
H_{2}O

- Toby Morse – vocals
- Todd Morse – guitar, backing vocals
- Rusty Pistachio – guitar, backing vocals
- Adam Blake – bass, backing vocals
- Todd Friend – drums, backing vocals

=== Additional musicians ===
- Roger Miret – vocals on "Nothing to Prove"
- Freddy Cricien – vocals on "A Thin Line"
- CIV – guests on "Still Here"
- Lou Koller – guest on "Fairweather Friend" and "What Happened"
- Kevin Seconds – guest on "Fairweather Friend"
- Matt Skiba – guest on "What Happened"
- Danny Diablo – guest on "Nothing to Prove"
- Stephen Looker – backing vocals

=== Production ===
- Sons of Nero – artwork
