= Spectre (Stick to Your Guns album) =

Studio album by Stick to Your Guns
- Released: July 29, 2022
- Recorded: 2021–2022
- Genre: Metalcore; melodic hardcore
- Length: 34:25
- Label: End Hits
- Producer: Drew Fulk

Stick to Your Guns chronology
True View (2017)	Spectre (2022)	Keep Planting Flowers (2025)

Singles from Spectre
- 1. "Weapon" Released: April 7, 2022; 2. "Hush" Released: July 11, 2022; 3. "Open Up My Head" Released: July 20, 2022

Professional ratings
Review scores
Source	Rating
Boolin Tunes	8.5/10
Kerrang!	4/5
New Noise Magazine	4/5 stars
Sonic Perspectives	8.9/10
Unraveled	8.5/10
Wall of Sound	5.5/10

Spectre is the seventh full-length studio album by American metalcore band Stick to Your Guns, released on July 29, 2022. It was produced by Drew Fulk, known for his production work with A Day to Remember, Bullet for My Valentine, and Ice Nine Kills.

== Track listing ==
No.	Title	Length
1.	"My Heart Is A..."	0:37
2.	"Weapon"	3:34
3.	"Who Dares Wins"	2:48
4.	"Hush"	2:34
5.	"A World to Win"	3:19
6.	"Open Up My Head"	3:17
7.	"Liberate"	2:49
8.	"The Shine"	3:05
9.	"Instruments of the End"	2:33
10.	"Father"	3:00
11.	"More of Us Than Them"	3:03
12.	"No Way to Live"	3:46
Total length:		34:25

== Personnel ==
Stick to Your Guns

- Jesse Barnett – lead vocals, additional guitars, piano
- Josh James – lead guitar, backing vocals
- Chris Rawson – rhythm guitar, backing vocals
- Andrew Rose – bass, backing vocals
- George Schmitz – drums
