= H2O (H2O album) =

1996 studio album by H2O

H_{2}O

Studio album by H_{2}O
- Released: June 25, 1996
- Recorded: January 15–17, 1996
- Studios: Brielle Studios, New York City
- Genre: Hardcore punk
- Length: 29:46
- Label: Blackout
- Producers: Larry Bucksbaum, H_{2}O

H_{2}O chronology
H_{2}O (1996)	Thicker than Water (1997)

Professional ratings
Review scores
Source	Rating
AllMusic	2.5/5 stars

H_{2}O is the first album released by American hardcore punk band H_{2}O. It was released on June 25, 1996. The CD was recorded and mixed in three days. H_{2}O did a video for "Family Tree" in the fall of 1996.

== Track listing ==
1. "5 Yr. Plan" – 2:57
2. "Scene Report" – 2:18
3. "Spirit of '84" – 2:04
4. "I Know Why" – 2:50
5. "Gen-Eric" – 0:59
6. "Surrounded" – 2:01
7. "Here Today, Gone Tomorrow" – 2:38
8. "Family Tree" – 2:56
9. "Hi-Lo" – 2:04
10. "My Curse" – 9:00 (3:05 on Japanese release)
11. "Go!" – 2:41 (Japan only)
12. "Mask" – 2:35 (Japan only)
- All songs written by H_{2}O
- Track 10 is only actually 3:05 – studio feedback then leads directly into a live hidden track, "My Love Is Real".

== Personnel ==
H_{2}O

- Toby Morse – lead vocals
- Todd Morse – guitar, backing vocals
- Rusty Pistachio – guitar, backing vocals
- Eric Rice – bass, backing vocals
- Todd Friend – drums, backing vocals

=== Additional musicians ===
- Dicky Barrett – vocals on "Family Tree"
- Tim Shaw (credited as Tim Ensign) – vocals on "Here Today, Gone Tomorrow", bass on "My Love Is Real"
- Armand Majidi – drums on "My Love Is Real"
- Pete Koller – guitar on "My Love Is Real"

=== Production ===
- Recorded January 15–17, 1996, at Brielle Studios in New York City
- Produced by Larry Buksbaum and H_{2}O
