= Keep Planting Flowers =

Studio album by Stick to Your Guns
- Released: January 10, 2025
- Recorded: 2024
- Genres: Melodic hardcore, metalcore
- Length: 24:50
- Label: SharpTone Records

Stick to Your Guns chronology
Spectre (2022)	Keep Planting Flowers (2025)

Singles from Keep Planting Flowers
- 1. "Permanent Dark" Released: June 9, 2024; 2. "Invisible Rain" Released: June 9, 2024; 3. "Severed Forever" Released: September 27, 2024; 4. "More Than a Witness" Released: November 15, 2024

Professional ratings
Review scores
Source	Rating
Distorted Sound	8/10
Ghost Cult Magazine	9/10

Keep Planting Flowers is the eighth full-length studio album by American hardcore punk band Stick to Your Guns, released on January 10, 2025. It was produced by Beau Burchell, founding guitarist of Saosin and vocalist Jesse Barnett's other band Ways Away. "Who Needs Who" and "H84U" feature guest vocals by Scott Vogel from Terror and Connie Sgarbossa from SeeYouSpaceCowboy, respectively.

The band toured to promote the album with support from Bane, Terror, Dare, and Hold My Own. They also toured in North America with Paleface Swiss and Nasty in April 2025.

== Track listing ==
No.	Title	Length
1.	"We All Die Anyway"	1:20
2.	"Spineless"	3:24
3.	"Permanent Dark"	2:14
4.	"Invisible Rain"	2:34
5.	"Severed Forever"	2:43
6.	"More Than a Witness"	2:17
7.	"Keep Planting Flowers"	3:05
8.	"Eat Me Up"	3:51
9.	"Who Needs Who" (featuring Scott Vogel)	1:00
10.	"H84U" (featuring Connie Sgarbossa)	2:22
Total length:		24:50

== Personnel ==
Stick to Your Guns

- Jesse Barnett – lead vocals, additional guitars, piano
- Josh James – lead guitar, backing vocals
- Chris Rawson – rhythm guitar, backing vocals
- Andrew Rose – bass, backing vocals
- Adam Galindo – drums
