= Simple Life (Mason Jennings album) =

Studio album by Mason Jennings
- Released: 2002
- Genre: Folk
- Length: 38:26
- Label: Architect Records
- Producer: Mason Jennings

Mason Jennings chronology
Century Spring (2002)	Simple Life (2002)	Use Your Voice (2004)

Professional ratings
Review scores
Source	Rating
AllMusic	4/5 stars

Simple Life is a collection of solo acoustic songs by Mason Jennings. It was released in 2002 on Architect Records.

== Track listing ==
1. "Hospitals and Jails" - 3:55
2. "Isabel" - 3:40
3. "Lilacs" - 1:45
4. "Simple Life" - 1:00
5. "Summer Dress" - 2:10
6. "Little Details" - 2:32
7. "Isabella Part II" - 3:19
8. "In My Grave" - 2:57
9. "Family Tree" - 2:34
10. "Ain't Gonna Die" - 2:40
11. "Amphetamine Girl" - 2:11
12. "12/8 Time" - 2:36
13. "Rebecca DeVille" - 7:02
