= Birds Flying Away =

Studio album by Mason Jennings
- Released: January 2000
- Genre: Folk
- Length: 39:53
- Label: Mason Jennings; Bar/None (reissue)
- Producer: Ed Ackerson, Mason Jennings

Mason Jennings chronology
Mason Jennings (1997)	Birds Flying Away (2000)	Century Spring (2002)

Professional ratings
Review scores
Source	Rating
AllMusic	4/5 stars
Pitchfork	(7.0/10)

Birds Flying Away is the second album by Mason Jennings. It was released in January 2000 by the label Bar/None.

While writing this album, the drummer Chris Stock left and was replaced. Jennings had another setback for six months when he contracted mononucleosis, which delayed the release of the album.

Jennings is compared to Dave Matthews in a New York Times review. Unlike the debut, the album included several songs with political themes.

== Critical reception ==
City Pages called Birds Flying Away Jennings's best album, in a 2016 ranking, writing that "his blend of acoustic storytelling, historical themes, and funky instrumentation (there’s an alto-saxophone solo on the politically/historically charged 'Black Panther') makes for a perfect mix."

The song "Birds Flying Away" was covered by Streetlight Manifesto on their album 99 Songs of Revolution: Vol. 1.

== Track listing ==
1. "Confidant" - 3:47
2. "United States Global Empire" - 3:02
3. "Ballad for My One True Love" - 4:32
4. "Black Panther" - 3:58
5. "Dr. King" - 3:24
6. "Stars Shine Quietly" - 3:49
7. "Birds Flying Away" - 3:13
8. "The Mountain" - 4:15
9. "Duluth" - 3:03
10. "Train Leaving Gray" - 2:20
11. "The Light" - 4:23

== Personnel ==
- Mason Jennings - guitar, vocals, producer
- Bob Skoro - bass guitar, vocals, assistant producer
- Edgar Oliveria - drums
- Chris Thompson - alto saxophone
- Dave Gardner - mastering
- Ed Ackerson - producer, engineer
- Tom Garneau - engineer
- Camron Wittig - design, photography
