= Blood of Man =

Studio album by Mason Jennings
- Released: September 14, 2009
- Recorded: 2009
- Genre: Folk
- Length: 42:03
- Label: Brushfire
- Producer: Mason Jennings

Mason Jennings chronology
In the Ever (2008)	Blood of Man (2009)	The Flood (2010)

Professional ratings
Review scores
Source	Rating
AllMusic	3.5/5 stars
Rolling Stone	4/5 stars

Blood of Man is the eighth album by Mason Jennings. It was released in 2009 by Brushfire Records. Jennings recorded all of the instruments on the album himself and the album has a more extensive use of electric guitars than his previous two albums. Jennings referred to the album's subject matter in a short film titled "Blood of Man", where he stated that he drew heavily on childhood experiences.

On June 2, 2009, the single "Sunlight" was released on iTunes with all proceeds to go to the Surfrider Foundation in efforts to help clean up beaches around America.

== Track listing ==
All tracks by Mason Jennings

1. "City of Ghosts" – 3:13
2. "Pittsburgh" – 3:55
3. "The Field" – 5:37
4. "Tourist" – 3:20
5. "Black Wind Blowing" – 4:47
6. "Ain't No Friend of Mine" – 3:12
7. "Sing Out" – 4:27
8. "Sunlight" – 4:32
9. "Lonely Road" – 4:04
10. "Blood of Man" – 5:04
11. "Waves" – 2:36 (iTunes bonus track)

== Personnel ==
- Mason Jennings - producer, writer, recording, performer
- Daniel Field - photography, art direction
- Alex Field - design, layout
- Johannes Gamble - design, layout
- Danny Clinch - color photograph
- Scott Soens - B&W photograph
