= In the Ever =

Studio album by Mason Jennings
- Released: May 20, 2008
- Genre: Folk
- Length: 38:23
- Label: Brushfire
- Producer: Mason Jennings

Mason Jennings chronology
Boneclouds (2006)	In the Ever (2008)	Blood of Man (2009)

Professional ratings
Review scores
Source	Rating
American Songwriter	3.5/5 stars

In the Ever is the sixth album by Mason Jennings. It was released in 2008 by Brushfire Records. The UK version of the album contains a twelfth track, titled "Sassafrass."

== Production ==
The album was recorded in a cabin to the west of Minneapolis. Aside from the instruments, the only equipment used was a laptop and two microphones.

== Critical reception ==
The Line of Best Fit called the album "a charming and soundly constructed set of songs." City Pages called it "a disappointment for longstanding fans," writing that "the days of front-to-back high-caliber Mason Jennings albums may have passed." PopMatters wrote that In the Ever "more closely resembles a melancholy collection of American folk songs while sticking to [Jennings's] familiar themes: religion’s ambiguity, politics, and love."

== Track listing ==
1. "Never Knew Your Name" – 3:39
2. "Something About Your Love" – 4:30
3. "I Love You and Buddha Too" – 2:15
4. "Fighter Girl" – 3:20
5. "Your New Man" – 4:07
6. "Memphis, Tennessee" – 2:12
7. "Going Back to New Orleans" – 2:01
8. "How Deep Is that River" – 3:50
9. "Soldier Boy" – 3:44
10. "My Perfect Lover" – 6:08
11. "In Your City" – 2:31
  - "Sassafrass" – 2:56 (UK edition bonus track)
  - "The Fisherman" – 3:43 (iTunes bonus track)

== Personnel ==
- Mason Jennings sang and played all of the instruments except noted below:
- Arabella Kauffmann - bass guitar on "Fighter Girl"
- David Boucher - bass guitar on "Fighter Girl"
- Brian McLeod - drums on "Fighter Girl"
- Jonny Polonsky - pump organ on "How Deep Is That River"
- Chris Morrissey - upright bass and harmony vocals on "Memphis, Tennessee"
- Jack Johnson - additional vocals on "I Love You And Buddha Too"
