= F.T.T.W. =

Studio album by H_{2}O
- Released: May 18, 1999
- Recorded: January 1999
- Studio: Coyote (Brooklyn)
- Genre: Hardcore punk, melodic hardcore
- Length: 34:38
- Label: Epitaph
- Producer: Brett Gurewitz

H_{2}O chronology
Thicker Than Water (1997)	F.T.T.W. (1999)	Go (2001)

Professional ratings
Review scores
Source	Rating
AllMusic	4/5 stars

F.T.T.W. (Faster Than the World ) is the third album released by H_{2}O. It was released on May 18, 1999. It was their second of two albums to be released on Epitaph Records before they moved to MCA Records.

The final track includes a hidden track, "Not Just Boys Fun", which is a 7 Seconds cover.

The band shot a video for the song "One Life, One Chance".

== Track listing ==
All songs by H_{2}O unless otherwise noted.

1. "Faster Than the World" – 2:17
2. "Empty Pockets" – 1:13
3. "One Life, One Chance" – 1:55
4. "Guilty by Association" – 2:24
5. "Fading" – 1:53
6. "Bootstraps" – 1:00
7. "Can I Overcome?" – 1:27
8. "Found the Truth Within" – 1:52
9. "Old School Recess" – 1:06
10. "Helpless Not Hopeless" – 2:36
11. "On Your Feet" – 1:41
12. "Day by Day" – 1:30
13. "Force Field" – 1:55
14. "Ez.2.B. Anti" – 2:14
15. "M & M" – 2:01
16. "Reputation Calls" – 1:16
17. "Liberate" – 2:21
18. "Follow the Three Way" – 3:48
  - Contains the hidden track "Not Just Boys Fun" (7 Seconds)

== Personnel ==
H_{2}O

- Toby Morse – vocals
- Todd Morse – guitar, vocals
- Rusty Pistachio – guitar, backing vocals
- Adam Blake – bass, backing vocals
- Todd Friend – drums, backing vocals

=== Additional musicians ===
- Dicky Barrett – vocals on "Faster Than the World" and "Force Field"
- Tim Armstrong – vocals on "Faster Than the World"
- Roger Miret – vocals on "Faster Than the World"
- Ryunosuke – vocals on "Faster Than the World"
- Freddy Cricien – vocals on "Guilty by Association"
- Anthony Civarelli – vocals on "EZ. 2. B. Anti"
- Denise Miret – vocals on "Not Just Boys Fun"
- Melissa Corales – vocals on "Not Just Boys Fun"
- Wendy Schnaars – vocals on "Not Just Boys Fun"
- Under the Gun – vocals on "Not Just Boys Fun"

=== Production ===
- Engineered by Michael Caiati
