= Boneclouds =

Studio album by Mason Jennings
- Released: May 16, 2006
- Genre: Folk
- Length: 38:01
- Label: Glacial Pace
- Producers: Noah Georgeson, Mason Jennings

Mason Jennings chronology
Use Your Voice (2004)	Boneclouds (2006)	In the Ever (2008)

Professional ratings
Review scores
Source	Rating
AllMusic	3.5/5 stars
Rolling Stone	3.5/5 stars

Boneclouds is an album by Mason Jennings. It was released in 2006 by Glacial Pace.

== Production ==
The album was produced by Noah Georgeson, with minor input from Isaac Brock.

== Critical reception ==
NPR wrote that "though the production is cleaner and fuller sounding than on his earlier records, [Jennings] maintains the level of intimacy and insight that his fans have come to expect." American Songwriter called Boneclouds "the most dynamic and richly textured album of Jennings’ career." Billboard wrote that "there's a fine line between being genuine and being cheesy, and Boneclouds wrestles with this throughout." PopMatters called Jennings "an extraordinary player who dazzles through the charm and eloquence of his fret work." Paste lamented Jennings's "penchant for Hallmark sentimentality and easy rhymes."

== Track listing ==
1. "Be Here Now" – 3:48
2. "Gentlest Hammer" – 3:14
3. "If You Ain't Got Love" – 3:16
4. "Some Say I'm Not" – 3:57
5. "Moon Sailing on the Water" – 4:34
6. "Jackson Square" – 4:10
7. "If You Need a Reason" – 4:35
8. "Which Way Your Heart Will Go" – 3:18
9. "Where the Sun Had Been" – 2:12
10. "Jesus Are You Real" – 4:52
11. "Things Change" – 3:48 (iTunes bonus track)
