= For What It's Worth (album) =

Studio album by Stick to Your Guns
- Released: June 10, 2005; February 20, 2007
- Genre: Metalcore, melodic hardcore
- Length: 44:11
- Label: This City Is Burning (2005); Sumerian (2007)

Stick to Your Guns chronology
Compassion without Compromise (2004)	For What It's Worth (2005)	Comes from the Heart (2008)

For What It's Worth is the debut studio album by American melodic hardcore band Stick to Your Guns following their initial self-released 2004 EP titled Compassion Without Compromise. Originally released in 2005 by This City Is Burning Records, For What It's Worth was re-released on February 20, 2007 by Sumerian Records with two additional bonus tracks.

== Track listing ==
1. "For What It's Worth" – 3:35
2. "A Poor Man's Sport (Two Heads Are Better Than One)" – 3:10
3. "Colorblind" – 2:55
4. "Compassion without Compromise" – 3:31
5. "For the Kids, by the Kids" – 2:32
6. "Badge a Brand" – 2:43
7. "This Is More" – 1:48
8. "Fire with Fire" – 3:13
9. "Our Demise" – 2:45
10. "All Time Low" – 2:16
11. "Fashion or Fascist" – 0:40
12. "There Is No I in Team" – 2:26
13. "Industry of Infamy" – 2:20
14. "This Is Where My Heart Lies" – 3:21
15. "Such an Outrage" (2007 reissue bonus track) – 3:10
16. "Laugh Right Back" (2007 reissue bonus track) – 6:26

== Personnel ==
- Jesse Barnett – lead vocals, additional guitars
- Curtis Pleshe – lead guitar, backing vocals
- Justin Rutherford – rhythm guitar, backing vocals
- Noah Calvin – bass, backing vocals
- Casey Lagos – drums, backing vocals
- Produced, engineered, and mixed by Zack Ohren
