= Comes from the Heart =

Studio album by Stick to Your Guns
- Released: May 13, 2008
- Genre: Metalcore
- Length: 26:13; 37:54 (European Edition)
- Label: Century Media

Stick to Your Guns chronology
For What It's Worth (2005)	Comes from the Heart (2008)	The Hope Division (2010)

Professional ratings
Review scores
Source	Rating
AllMusic	2.5/5 stars

Comes from the Heart is the second release by American hardcore punk band Stick to Your Guns.

The album peaked at #33 on Billboard's Heatseekers chart.

== Critical reception ==
AllMusic wrote that the album "never achieves greatness, but considering how many embarrassingly sloppy screamo releases there have been in the 21st century, competent at least counts for something." Exclaim! wrote that the album pales in comparison to the band's live show.

== Track listing ==
No.	Title	Length
1.	"We're What Separates the Heart from the Heartless"	2:36
2.	"Impact"	3:22
3.	"Part of Me"	2:31
4.	"Enough is Enough"	4:00
5.	"Accessory Children"	3:05
6.	"Interlude"	2:16
7.	"Tonight's Entertainment"	2:37
8.	"We Must Look Like Ants from Up There"	2:00
9.	"Driving Force"	2:38
10.	"Looking for the Surface"	2:28
Total length:		26:13

European Edition
No.	Title	Length
11.	"This Is More" (Re-recorded version)	2:35
12.	"Tear the Walls Down" (from their 2004 Demo)	2:53
13.	"Compassion Without Compromise" (from their 2004 Demo)	3:44
14.	"There is No "I" in Team" (from their 2004 Demo)	2:29
Total length:		37:54

== Personnel ==
- Jesse Barnett – lead vocals, guitars
- Casey Lagos – drums, percussion, guitars, bass, programming, vocals on "Part of Me" and "Tonight's Entertainment"
- Produced by Zeuss
