= Stick to Your Guns (band) =

American hardcore punk band

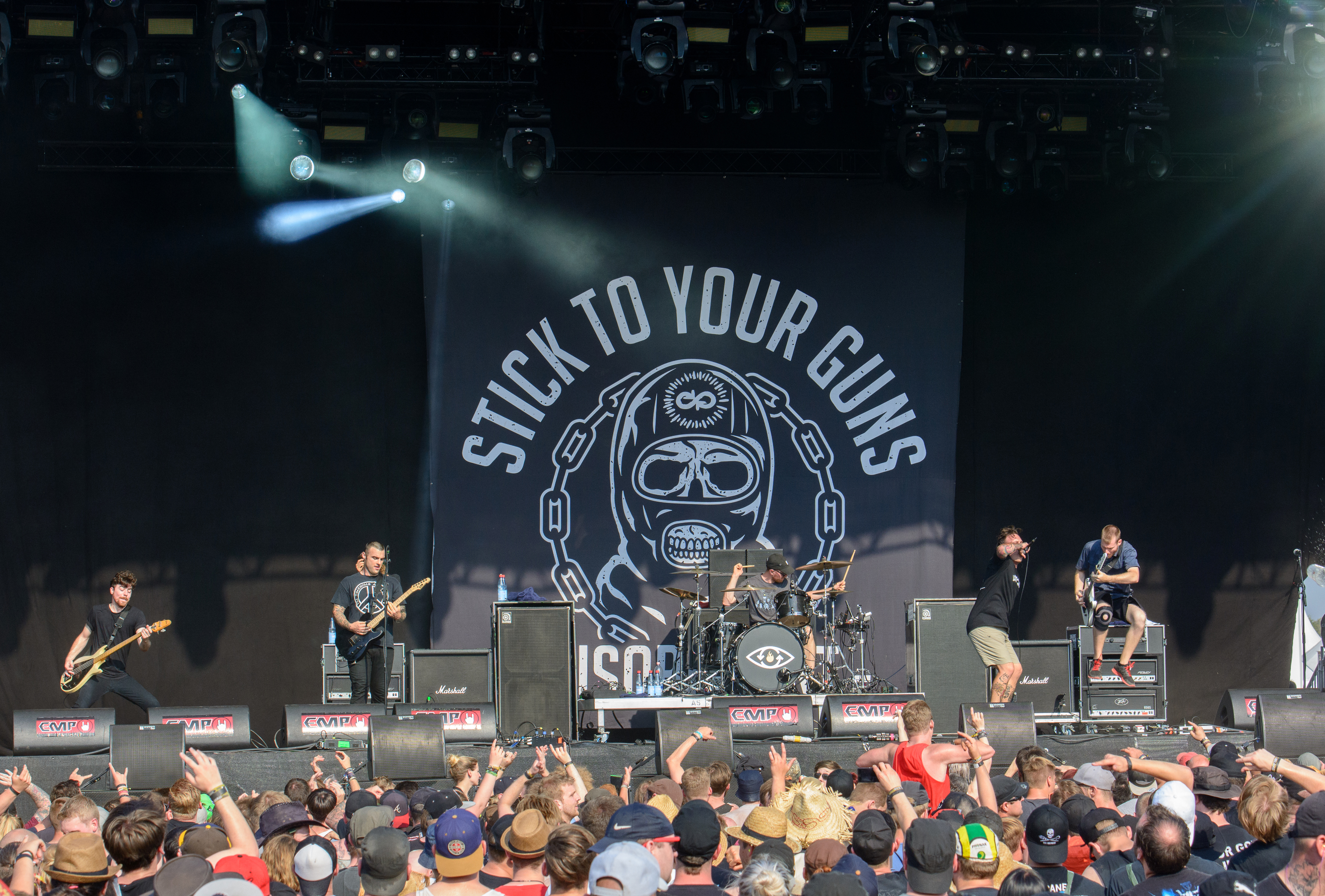
- Stick to Your Guns at Reload Festival 2016, Germany

Background information
- Origin: Orange County, California, U.S.
- Genres: Hardcore punk; melodic hardcore; metalcore
- Years active: 2003–present
- Labels: This City Is Burning; Century Media; Sumerian; Pure Noise; End Hits; SharpTone
- Members: Jesse Barnett; Andrew Rose; Chris Rawson; Josh James; Adam Galindo
- Past members: Reid Haymond; Alex Barnett; Darel McFayden; Ryan Nelson; Casey Lagos; Justin Rutherford; Curtis Pleshe; Noah Calvin; George Schmitz

Stick to Your Guns is an American metalcore band from Orange County, California. Members of the band include lead vocalist Jesse Barnett, bassist Andrew Rose, guitarists Chris Rawson and Josh James, and drummer Adam Galindo. They are currently signed with SharpTone Records.

== History ==
=== Early years, For What It's Worth, and Comes from the Heart (2003–2008) ===
Frontman Jesse Barnett formed the band by recruiting Casey Lagos (whom he knew from his days on the worship team for Saddleback Church) on drums. After composing a few songs together, the two enlisted Justin Rutherford and Curtis Pleshe on guitars and Noah Calvin on bass. Their style made an impression locally, leading to the release of their first EP, Compassion without Compromise, in 2004. The band travelled to Oakland, California to debut their first studio album For What It's Worth, later released on This City Is Burning Records. The album includes one of their best known songs, "This Is More", and its release launched them to wider prominence, while the members were still in high school. Upon graduation, they went on tour throughout the United States.

In 2007, Century Media Records signed the band and re-released their debut album with two bonus tracks. After several line-up changes, the band started recording their second full-length album with only two members, Jesse Barnett and Casey Lagos. Marking a significant change in Barnett's vocal style, Comes from the Heart was released in 2008 through Century Media. That year, the band was part of Warped Tour, Hell on Earth and numerous other tours. While they were supporting Every Time I Die's tour in November 2008, Casey Lagos decided to quit the band to pursue his own musical career.

=== Signing with Sumerian Records and The Hope Division (2008–2011) ===
Ash Avildsen of Sumerian Records signed the band after seeing them at the Anaheim House of Blues. In 2010 the band began working on their third full-length with a stable line-up consisting of Jesse Barnett on vocals, George Schmitz on drums, Chris Rawson and Reid Haymond on guitars and Andrew Rose on bass. The Hope Division was released on June 1 meeting critical acclaim and leading them to mainstream success.

In November 2011, Stick to Your Guns posted a picture on their Facebook of a 20-year-old Arizona fan, Samuel Perkins, after several of his friends got tattoos of the heart which features on the cover of The Hope Division as a tribute to their friend. Along with the tattoo are the words "At least he died a lion." This was due to his long and painful battle with a brain tumor that he fought against; his friends called him the best person they have ever met. Stick to Your Guns saw the unity in their actions and decided to pay tribute to him by performing as the headliner at Sam's memorial show.

=== Diamond and Disobedient (2011–2016) ===
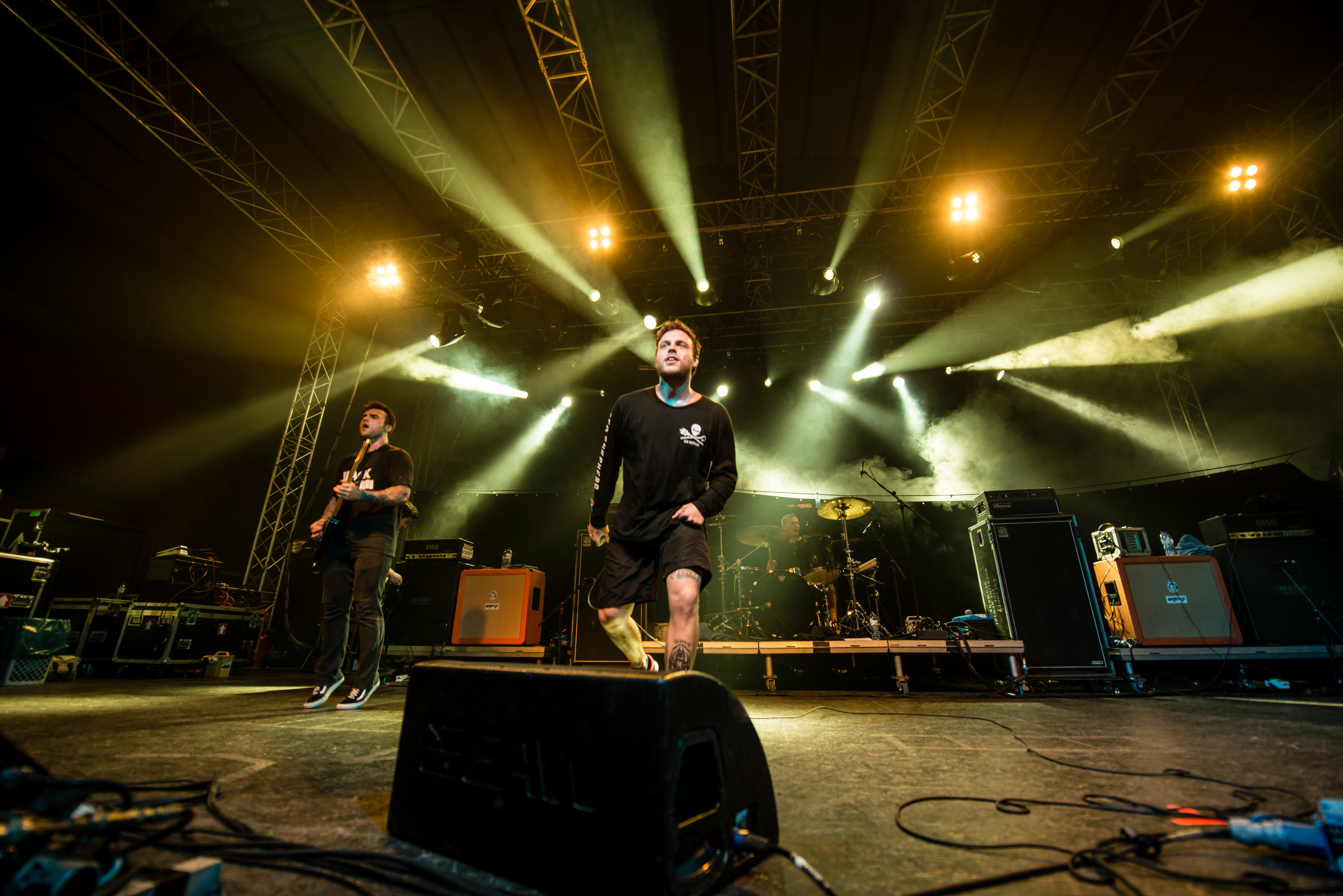
Stick to Your Guns performing at Impericon Festival 2015

In 2011, a stand-alone single titled "Bringing You Down (A New World Overthrow)" and featuring guest vocals of Karl Schwartz from First Blood, was released in support of the Occupy Wall Street movement. This song was an early version of a single from their fourth album, Diamond, which was released in 2012 with Josh James (of Evergreen Terrace) replacing Reid Haymond on guitar. The genre-bending album debuted on the Billboard charts making it to #1 on the Heatseekers chart, #11 for Hard Rock Albums, #30 for Rock Albums and placed on the Billboard 200. Later that year, Josh James confirmed that he left Evergreen Terrace to become a permanent member of the band.

The band released several single to promote the album. One of the singles, "We Still Believe", went on to gain consistent radio play. The album scored the band a spot on the 2013 Warped Tour. While on the Warped Tour, it was announced that "Diamond" won an Independent Music Award for best Hardcore/Metal Album of the year.

In 2013, Pure Noise Records released a split EP which contained two songs from the band and two from The Story So Far. The EP featured their single "We Still Believe" and a cover of Inside Out's "Burning Fight". On 2014, they released Diamond: Decade Edition, a vinyl re-release of Diamond which featured three bonus tracks. The band was also featured on Florence + The Sphinx: Sumerian Ceremonials, a tribute album to Florence + The Machine, covering "Dog Days Are Over".

On February 5, 2014, the band entered the studio with producer John Feldmann (The Used, Story of the Year) to record their fifth studio album. Throughout the recording, the band released studio updates, confirming several guests to record vocals on the record, including: Scott Vogel of Terror, Toby Morse of H_{2}O, Walter Delgado of Rotting Out, the members of Motionless in White and producer John Feldmann himself. Recording finished on March 12, 2014.

On September 16, 2014, the band released a teaser video for their new album on their Facebook page, announcing the album's title as being Disobedient, as well as the album's release date—February 10, 2015. The band then premiered a new track from the album on October 21, titled "Nobody" through Alternative Press.

=== New releases (2016–present) ===
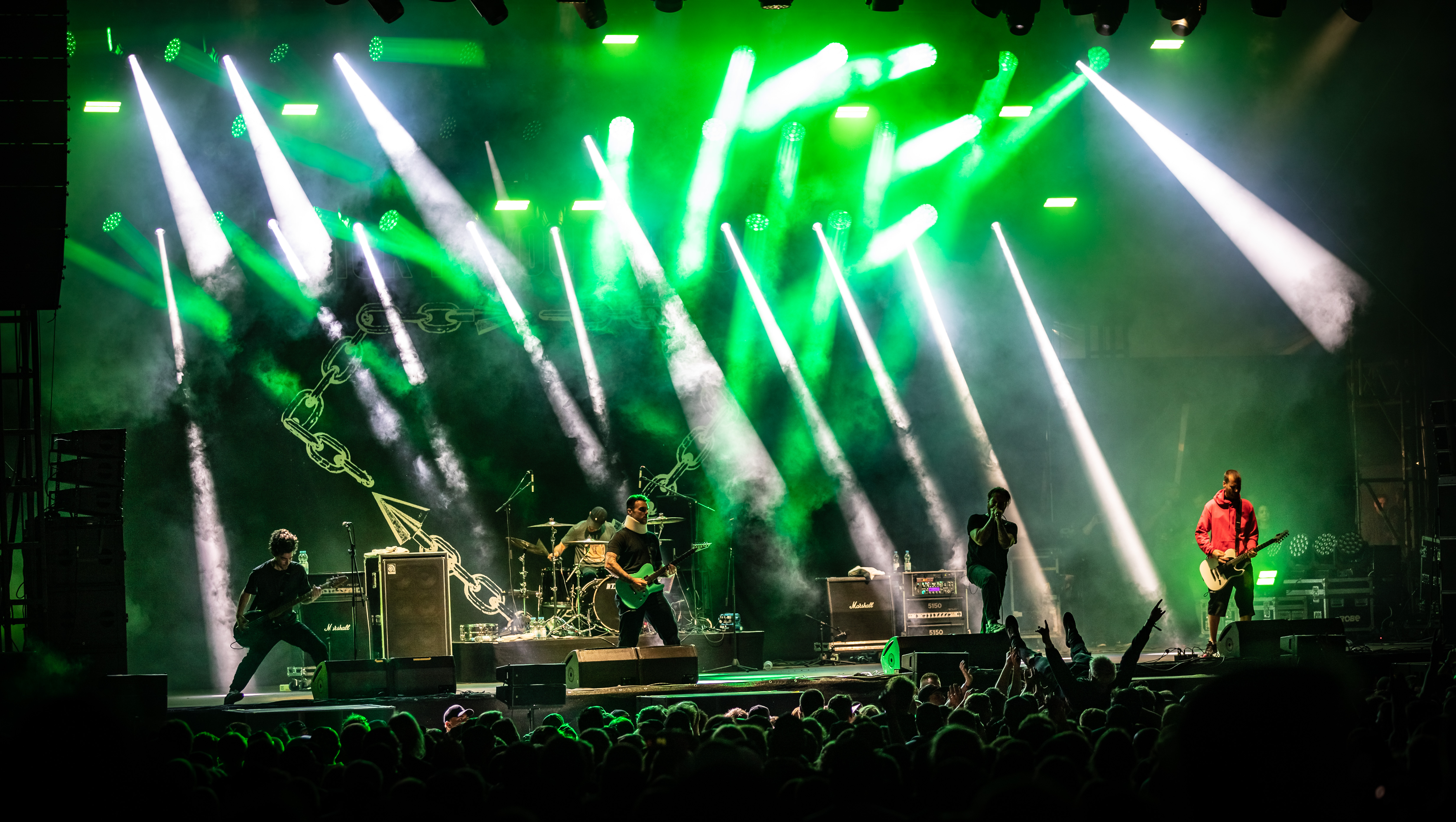
Stick to Your Guns performing at Rock am Ring 2022

In July 2016 it was announced that Stick to Your Guns had left Sumerian Records and signed to Pure Noise Records. The band released their first song after label change called Universal Language on July 16, 2016. It was announced that Stick to Your Guns would release an EP later that year. In August more information about the EP was published. The name is Better Ash Than Dust and was set for release on September 23, 2016, via Pure Noise Records and End Hits Records for a European release.

Between September 8 and October 2, 2016, the band toured throughout North America alongside Hardcore punk acts Stray from the Path and Knocked Loose. Stick to Your Guns became the first American band to play a concert in East African country Kenya. Their sixth album, True View, was released on October 13, 2017.

In November and December 2017, Stick to Your Guns played another European tour which was supported by Being as an Ocean and Silent Planet. In the beginning of 2018 Stick to Your Guns toured North America with British band Architects and Canadian hardcore band Counterparts. In the Spring of 2018, Stick to Your Guns supported Parkway Drive on their USA tour. Stick to Your Guns co-headlined a North American tour in the fall of 2018 with Emmure. Wage War and Sanction joined the lineup as support.

Stick to Your Guns headlined the "Pure Noise Tour" in the Summer of 2019 in North America. Counterparts, Terror, Year of the Knife and Sanction all joined up as support for the tour. Stick to Your Guns also supported Knocked Loose on their Different Shade of Blue Tour. Rotting Out, Candy and SeeYouSpaceCowboy also joined up as support.

In September of 2019, Barnett released the debut album from his Wish You Were Here side project.

On February 18, 2021, Stick to Your Guns released an EP titled The Meaning Remains. It contained acoustic versions of Amber, Nobody, Forgiveness of Self, and a cover of Take on Me.

The band released their seventh album Spectre on July 29, 2022. It is followed by their eighth album Keep Planting Flowers, released on January 10, 2025.

== Musical style ==
Critics have categorised Stick to Your Guns' music as melodic hardcore, metalcore and hardcore punk. They have cited influences including Comeback Kid, BoySetsFire, Death By Stereo, Seventh Star, Hatebreed, the Red Chord, the Acacia Strain and Between the Buried and Me.

== Members ==
Stick to Your Guns live at With Full Force 2018

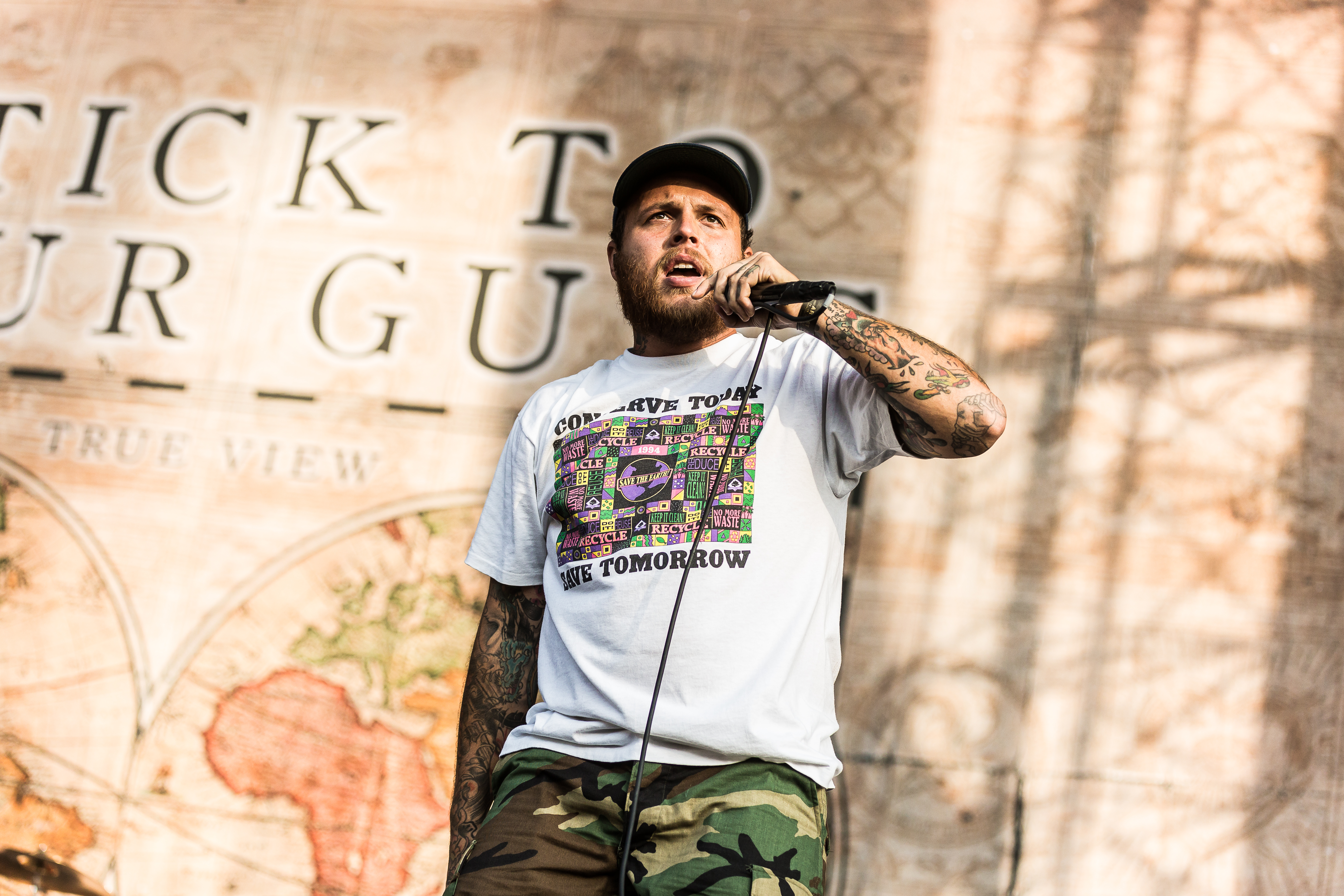
Jesse Barnett

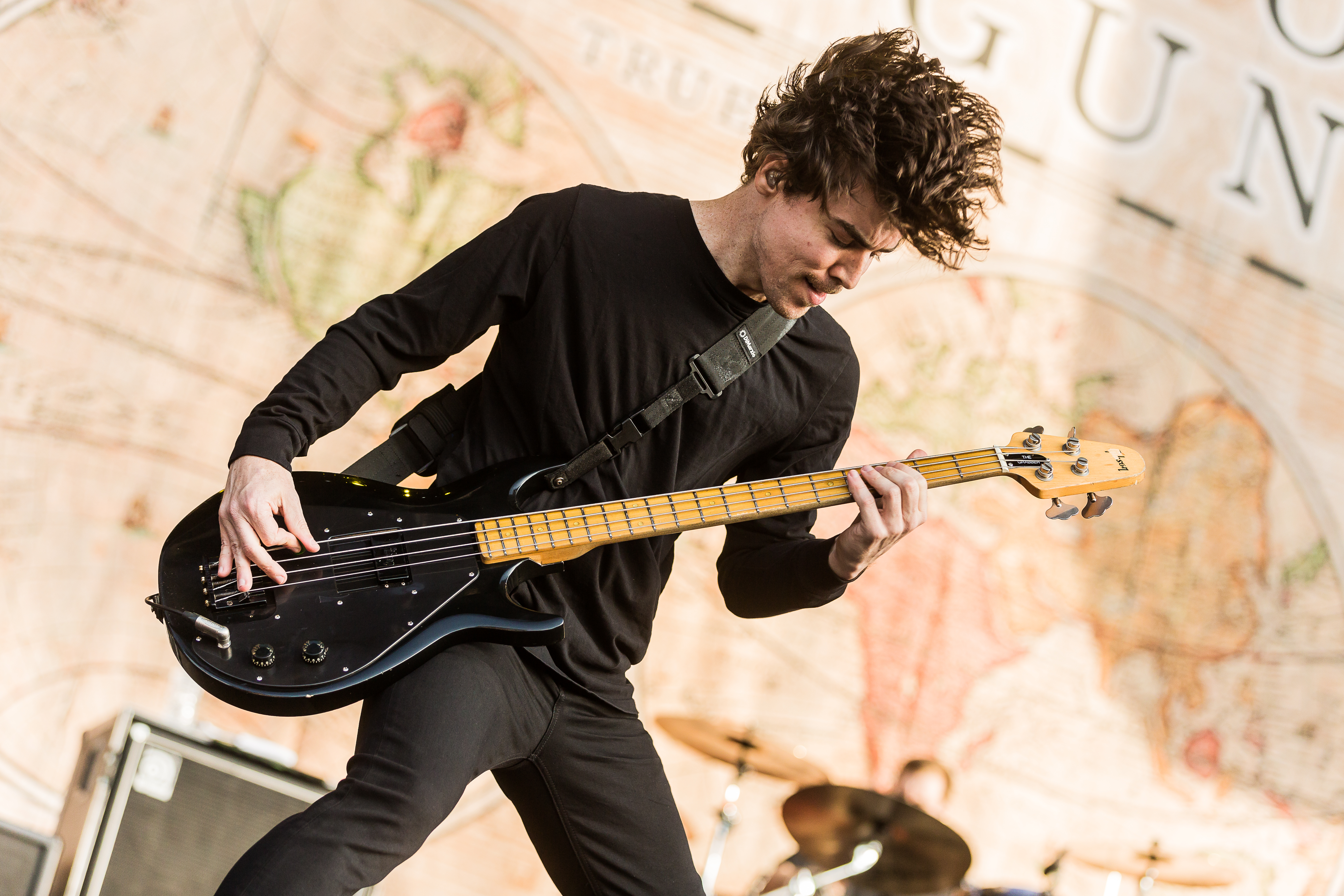
Andrew Rose

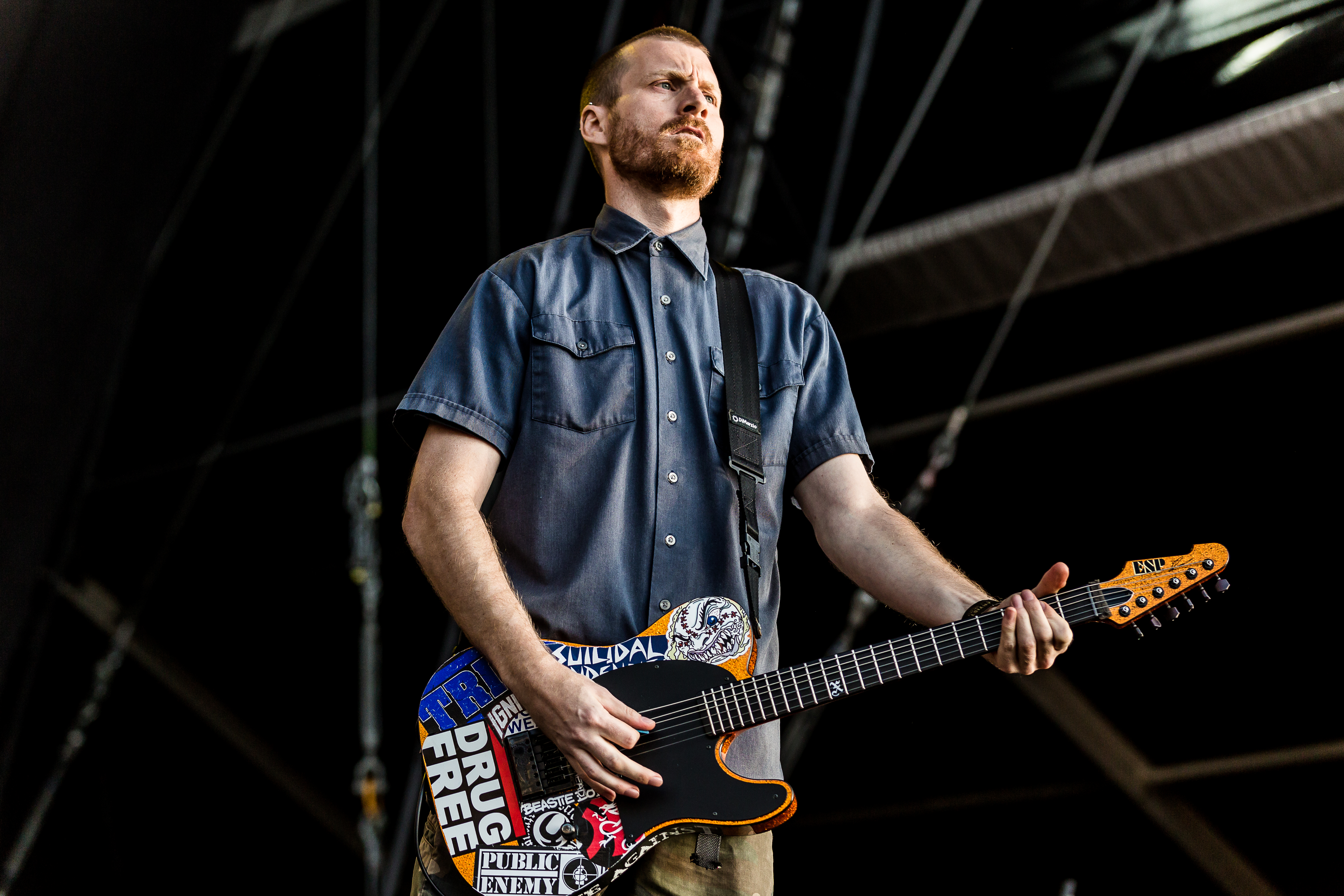
Chris Rawson

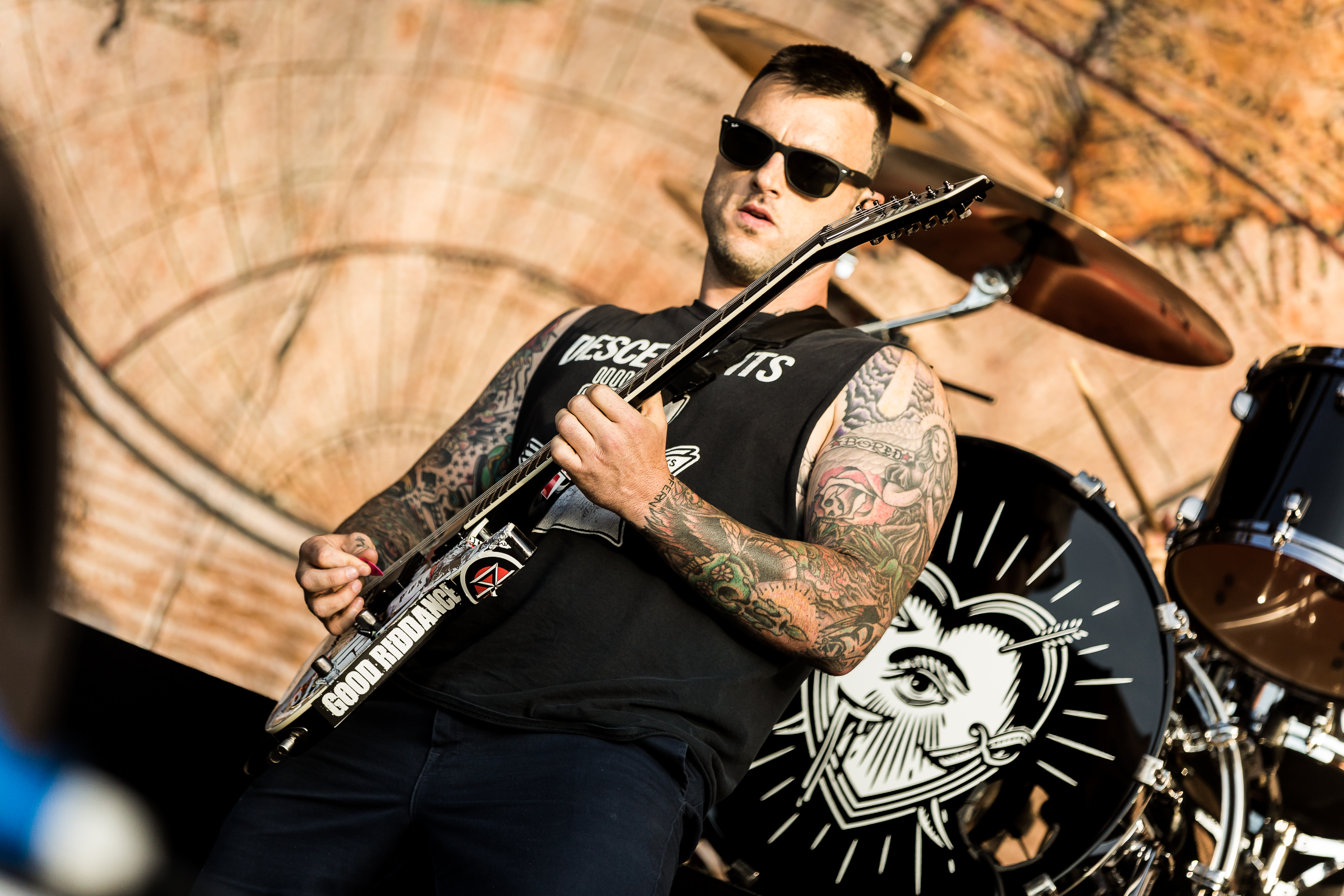
Josh James

Current members

- Jesse Barnett – lead vocals, additional guitars (2003–present), piano (2008–present), lead guitar (2010–2012)
- Andrew Rose – bass, backing vocals (2008–present)
- Chris Rawson – rhythm guitar, backing vocals (2009–present)
- Josh James – lead guitar, backing vocals (2012–present)
- Adam Galindo – drums (2022–present)

Former members

- Curtis Pleshe – lead guitar, backing vocals (2003–2006)
- Noah Calvin – bass, backing vocals (2003–2006)
- Justin Rutherford – rhythm guitar, backing vocals (2003–2006)
- Ryan Nelson – lead guitar, backing vocals (2006–2008)
- Darel McFayden – bass, backing vocals (2007–2008)
- Casey Lagos – drums, piano, backing vocals (2003–2008), bass (2006–2007)
- Alex Barnett – rhythm guitar, backing vocals (2006–2009)
- Reid Haymond – lead guitar, backing vocals (2008–2010)
- George Schmitz – drums (2008–2022)

== Discography ==
Studio albums

- For What It's Worth (2005, This City Is Burning Records)
- Comes from the Heart (2008, Century Media Records)
- The Hope Division (2010, Sumerian Records)
- Diamond (2012, Sumerian Records)
- Disobedient (2015, Sumerian Records)
- True View (2017, Pure Noise Records)
- Spectre (2022, Pure Noise Records)
- Keep Planting Flowers (2025, SharpTone Records)

Extended plays

- Compassion without Compromise (2004, self-released)
- The Story So Far vs. Stick to Your Guns (split CD) (2013, Pure Noise Records)
- Better Ash Than Dust (2016, Pure Noise Records/End Hits Records)
- The Meaning Remains (2021, Pure Noise Records)

Other songs

- "Laught Right Back" – 2008 version
- "Bringing You Down (A New World Overthrow)" – 2011 single, later re-recorded for Diamond
- "Dog Days Are Over" – from Florence + The Sphinx: Sumerian Ceremonials
- "Hasta La Victoria (Demo)" - Released in honor of Victor Jara, via Bandcamp only
