= Mason Jennings =

American singer-songwriter (born 1975

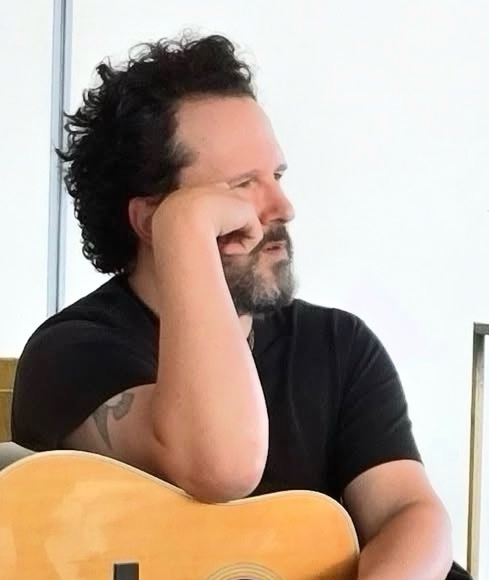
- Jennings in June 2026

Background information
- Born: 1975; Honolulu, Hawaii, U.S.
- Origin: Minneapolis, Minnesota, U.S.
- Genres: Indie folk, folk-rock
- Occupation: Singer-songwriter
- Instruments: Vocals, guitar, harmonica, piano, drums, bass
- Years active: 1997–present
- Labels: Bar/None; Brushfire Records; Loosegroove Records
- Website: masonjennings.com

Mason Jennings (born 1975) is an American folk-pop singer-songwriter.

== Biography ==
Born in 1975 in Honolulu, Hawaii, Jennings moved with his family to Pittsburgh at an early age. Jennings learned to play guitar at the age of 13, when he began writing songs. Jennings later dropped out of school and moved to Minneapolis to pursue his musical career.

Jennings produced his self-titled debut album in 1997 on an analog four-track in the living room of a rented home, playing all instruments himself. In October 1998, joined by drummer Chris Stock and bassist Robert Skoro, he began a weekly gig at the 400 Bar as the Mason Jennings Band. The two-week gig ended up lasting four months. In April 1999, six months after forming, The Mason Jennings Band was voted by the 1999 "Picked to Click Poll" conducted by the Minneapolis-St. Paul newspaper, City Pages. Mason began touring nationally and expanded the depth of his sound by inviting saxophonist Chris Thomson to play with them occasionally and replacing Stock with Brazilian jazz drummer Edgar Olivera.

Birds Flying Away (2000) revealed his penchant for singing first-person narratives of imaginary rustic characters. Following the release of this album, Noah Levy took over drumming duties from Olivera. In 2002, Jennings released a studio album, Century Spring, and a "fans only" collection of acoustic songs, Simple Life. Jennings released all three discs – and re-released his earlier albums – on his homebrew record label, Architect Records.

In 2003, Skoro and Levy left the band and were replaced by bassist Chris Morrissey (Bill Mike Band) and drummer Brian McLeod. On February 10, 2004, Jennings released Use Your Voice, which notably included the songs "Keepin' It Real," ostensibly written at the request of Shrek 2 producers (but not used in the film), and "The Ballad of Paul and Sheila," an acoustic dirge for late Minnesota senator Paul Wellstone. On September 30 of that year, the band released a DVD entitled Use Your Van, which chronicled the recording of Use Your Voice and part of the promotional tour. The DVD was filmed by Andy Grund.

On June 17, 2005, Jennings signed with Glacial Pace, a subsidiary of Sony's Epic Records headed by Isaac Brock. Minnesota's Star Tribune credited Brock with convincing Jennings to sign after Mason Jennings had opened for several Modest Mouse shows in 2004. Jennings had long avoided the major labels, citing desires to maintain creative control and dodge big-label politics. Glacial Pace is now an independent label.

Jennings recorded his sixth album, Boneclouds, at Pachyderm Studio in Cannon Falls, Minnesota, with producer Noah Georgeson. The album was released on May 16, 2006, by Glacial Pace. Soon thereafter, bassist Chris Morrisey left the band. Accompanying Jennings was new bassist Arabella Kauffmann and Brian McLeod on drums. Jennings sang two Bob Dylan songs, "The Times They Are a-Changin'" and "The Lonesome Death of Hattie Carroll."

In early 2008 Jennings signed with Jack Johnson's record label, Brushfire Records. Jennings released In the Ever in May 2008. The title was inspired by his son referring to where he was before he was born as, "In the ever". Jennings and Johnson met at Gustavus Adolphus College's Earth Jam in 2001 when Jennings was scheduled as Johnson's opening act. Jennings announced at the Elemental Experience Music & Arts Festival in San Diego, California on May 2, 2009, that he would be releasing a new album (later entitled Blood of Man) in summer 2009. He also mentioned that he would have music on the soundtrack for the documentary 180° South. The documentary was released in March 2010.

On September 15, 2009, Blood of Man was released on CD and vinyl format. A free bonus EP titled Independent (containing the tracks "Mark My Heart With Ashes" and "Wide Open Country") was distributed with the album at independent record stores. A week before the official CD release, a version of the album containing the exclusive track "Waves" was made available exclusively on iTunes. The album received a 4 star review in Rolling Stone.

In late 2010, Live at First Ave., his first live album ever, was released. In 2010, Jennings released The Flood. This album was made up of songs he had recorded in the 1990s on a cassette tape. Jennings rediscovered these songs and re-recorded them in a stripped down fashion to stay true to their intent. In 2011, he released Minnesota, his first new album of original songs since 2009's Blood of Man. On November 12, 2013, he released Always Been. The first single from the album was "Lonely Street", followed by "Wilderness". He released Wild Dark Metal in 2016. He got divorced from Amy Turany. After taking some time off to focus on painting and recovering from depression and agoraphobia he began touring again. He married Josie Jennings in 2018 and released an album of love songs inspired by their relationship on May 11, 2018, called Songs From When We Met.

Jennings started a new project called Painted Shield with guitarist Stone Gossard and drummer Matt Chamberlain in 2014. Their album was released November 27, 2020.

Jennings signed to Gossard’s label Loosegroove and released “Real Heart” in 2022, “Underneath The Roses” in 2023, “Holy Dive” in 2024, and “Magnifier” in 2025.

== Honors ==
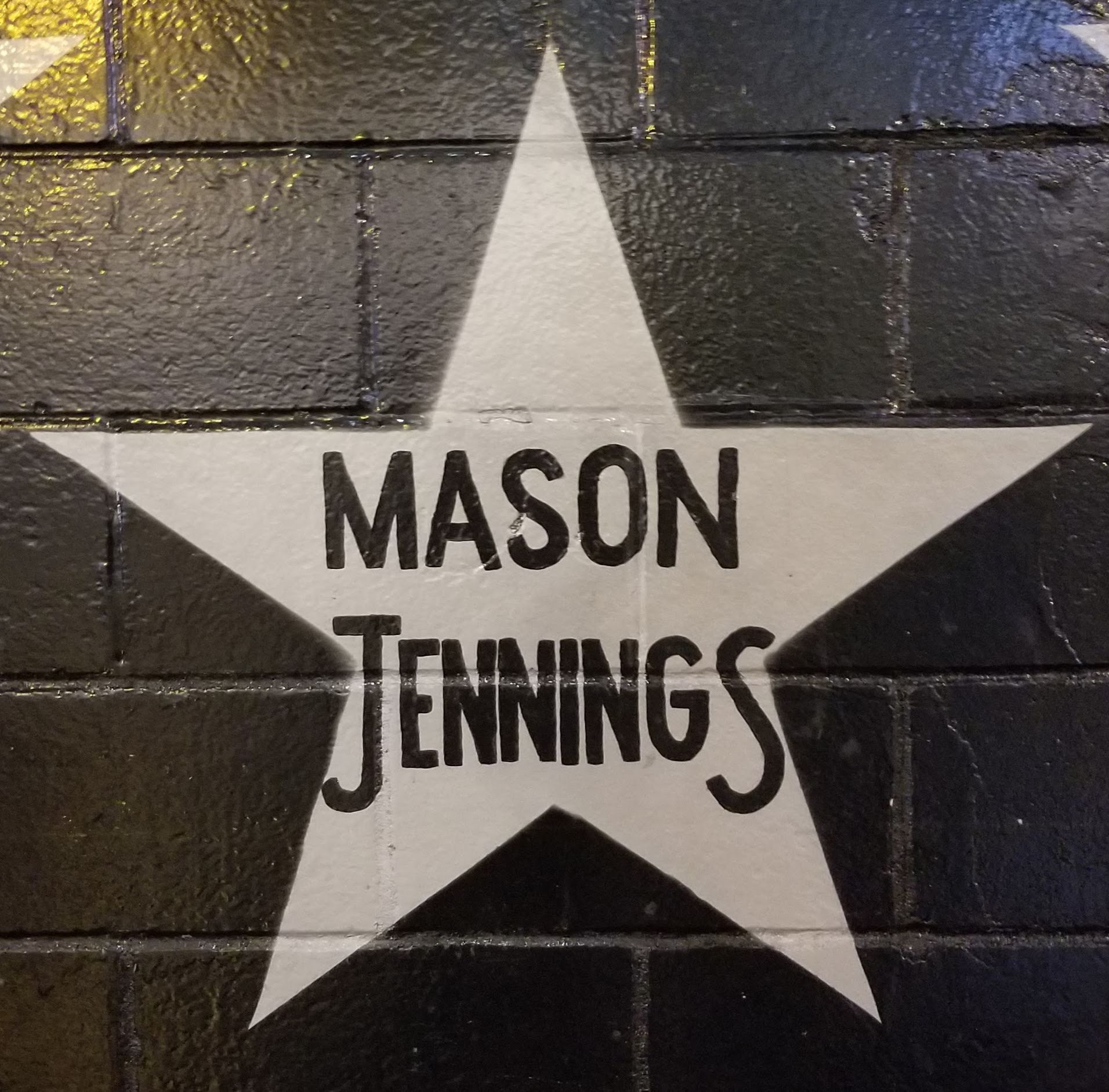
Jennings's star on the outside mural of the Minneapolis nightclub First Avenue

Jennings has been honored with a star on the outside mural of the Minneapolis nightclub First Avenue, recognizing performers that have played sold-out shows or have otherwise demonstrated a major contribution to the culture at the iconic venue. Receiving a star "might be the most prestigious public honor an artist can receive in Minneapolis," according to journalist Steve Marsh.

== Discography ==
=== Studio albums ===
- Mason Jennings (1997)
- Birds Flying Away (2000)
- Century Spring (2002)
- Simple Life (2002)
- Use Your Voice (2004)
- Boneclouds (2006)
- In the Ever (2008)
- Blood of Man (2009)
- The Flood (2010)
- Minnesota (2011)
- Always Been (2013)
- Wild Dark Metal (2016)
- Songs from When We Met (2018)
- Real Heart (2022)
- Underneath The Roses (2023)
- Holy Dive (2024)
- Magnifier (2025)
- Dark Wings (2026)

=== with Painted Shield ===
- Painted Shield (2020)
- Painted Shield 2 (2022)
- Painted Shield 3 (2024)

=== EPs ===
- Living in the Moment EP (2002)
- If You Need a Reason EP (2006)
- How Deep Is That River EP (2008)
- Independent EP (2009)

=== Live albums ===
- Live at First Ave. (2010)
- Fingerprints – September 20, 2009 (2012)

=== Other releases and appearances ===
- Use Your Van DVD (2004)
- I'm Not There (2007) – two songs
- 180° South: Conquerors of the Useless Soundtrack (2010)
- Far Away (Happiness) - Under the Rug (band) (2025)
