= Century Spring =

Studio album by Mason Jennings
- Released: 2002
- Genre: Folk
- Length: 31:58
- Label: Architect Records; Bar/None
- Producer: Robert Skoro, Mason Jennings

Mason Jennings chronology
Birds Flying Away (1998)	Century Spring (2002)	Simple Life (2002)

Professional ratings
Review scores
Source	Rating
AllMusic	4/5 stars

Century Spring is an album by Mason Jennings. It was released in 2002 on Architect Records and Bar/None.

== Critical reception ==
No Depression wrote that "the songs lean toward folk modesty: quiet strumming, clusters of piano notes laid out like building blocks." PopMatters wrote: "Singer-songwriter aficionados will undoubtedly find Jennings' contemplations of falling in love, falling out of love, and falling in love again, satisfying. Others will be content to keep playing the same 10 singer-songwriter albums they already own."

== Track listing ==
1. "Living in the Moment" - 2:05
2. "Sorry Signs on Cash Machines" - 4:18
3. "New York City" - 3:22
4. "Dewey Dell" - 2:08
5. "Forgiveness" - 3:15
6. "Century Spring" - 2:06
7. "Bullet" - 2:41
8. "Killer's Creek" - 3:24
9. "East of Eden" - 5:35
10. "Adrian" - 2:59

== Personnel ==
- Mason Jennings - vocals, guitar, piano (2, 5), bass guitar (6), drums (6)
- Noah Levy - drums, percussion
- Bob Skoro - bass guitar (4, 8), piano (4, 8), vocals (4, 8), Fender Rhodes (5)
- Ian Mussington - background vocals (2)
- Amy Turany - background vocals (7)
- Tom Garneau - recording, mixing
