= Mason Jennings (album) =

Studio album by Mason Jennings
- Released: June 9, 1997
- Genre: Folk
- Producer: Mason Jennings

Mason Jennings chronology
Mason Jennings (1997)	Birds Flying Away (2000)

Professional ratings
Review scores
Source	Rating
AllMusic	4/5 stars
Pitchfork Media	(7.0/10)

Mason Jennings is the first studio album by Mason Jennings.

== Critical reception ==
Dan Lee of AllMusic called the album "an amazingly realized work. A distinct sound and vocal style is evident, and there's not one clunker on this entire disc."

== Track listing ==
1. "Nothing" - 3:02
2. "Butterfly" - 2:09
3. "California" - 3:40
4. "Godless" - 2:14
5. "Big Sur" - 6:21
6. "California [Part II]" - 3:04
7. "1997" - 2:32
8. "Darkness Between the Fireflies" - 3:00
