= Diamond (Stick to Your Guns album) =

Studio album by Stick to Your Guns
- Released: March 27, 2012
- Genres: Melodic hardcore, metalcore
- Length: 34:32; 41:30 (Limited Edition); 43:09 (Decade Edition)
- Label: Sumerian Records
- Producers: Andrew Berlin, Bill Stevenson

Stick to Your Guns chronology
The Hope Division (2010)	Diamond (2012)	Disobedient (2015)

Singles from Diamond
- 1. "Bringing You Down" Released: February 10th, 2012; 2. "Against Them All" Released: February 20th, 2012; 3. "We Still Believe" Released: March 21st, 2012

Professional ratings
Review scores
Source	Rating
AbsolutePunk	(81%) link
Under The Gun Review	9.5/10
The New Review	link
Sputnikmusic	link
Lexington Music Press	link

Diamond is the fourth album by American hardcore punk band Stick to Your Guns.

== Background ==
The album was announced accompanying the release of a new song supporting the Occupy Wall Street movement, "Bringing You Down (A New World Overthrow)", which was re-recorded for the album. On February 10, 2012, they released a video on YouTube announcing that their new album would be titled Diamond and would be released on March 27, 2012. On February 20, a new song named "Against Them All" was released on iTunes and through the Sumerian Records YouTube account. The video for "We Still Believe" premiered on March 21 and is the official lead single from Diamond. A video for an acoustic live version of the song was also released the same day.

A limited vinyl edition of the album, labeled as Decade Edition, was released in 2014 to commemorate the 10th anniversary of the band. This edition, including 3 bonus tracks, was only available at the band's merchandise table on the "Fuck the Message" Tour and was limited to 1,000 copies. This edition was later available for digital download.

== Track listing ==
No.	Title	Length
1.	"Diamond"	2:24
2.	"Against Them All"	3:17
3.	"Such Pain"	2:37
4.	"The Bond"	2:36
5.	"We Still Believe"	3:33
6.	"Ring Loud (Last Hope)"	2:59
7.	"Empty Heads"	2:55
8.	"Beyond the Sun"	4:16
9.	"Life in a Box"	1:28
10.	"Bringing You Down" (ft. Carl Schwartz from First Blood)	3:52
11.	"D(I Am)ond"	1:45
12.	"Built Upon the Sand"	2:44
Total length:		34:32

Limited Edition
No.	Title	Length
13.	"Just Like Me"	3:04
14.	"We Still Believe" (Acoustic)	3:55
Total length:		41:30

Decade Edition
No.	Title	Length
15.	"I Resist"	1:39
Total length:		43:09

== Personnel ==
- Jesse Barnett – lead vocals, piano, additional guitars, lyrics, acoustic guitar on "We Still Believe" (acoustic version)
- Josh James – lead guitar, backing vocals, vocals on "Empty Heads"
- Chris Rawson – rhythm guitar, backing vocals, vocals on "Empty Heads"
- Andrew Rose – bass, backing vocals
- George Schmitz – drums
- Nick Diamond - Design

=== Additional personnel ===
- Carl Schwartz from First Blood – guest vocals on "Bringing You Down"
