= True View =

Studio album by Stick to Your Guns
- Released: October 13, 2017
- Recorded: 2016–2017
- Genre: Metalcore, melodic hardcore
- Length: 36:10
- Label: End Hits

Stick to Your Guns chronology
Disobedient (2015)	True View (2017)	Spectre (2022)

Professional ratings
Review scores
Source	Rating
Already Heard	5/5
Ghost Cult Magazine	7/10
Louder Sound	3/5 stars
Unraveled	10/10

True View is the sixth full-length studio album by American metalcore band Stick to Your Guns, released on October 13, 2017. One month before its release, on September 15, the band released the first single off the album, "Married to the Noise", along with a music video for the track.

Vocalist Jesse Barnett stated in an interview, "This entire record was inspired by conversations I had with my mother over the last two and a half years. She gave me the compass to be able to navigate this painful path."

The band embarked on the True View tour with Terror in Australia in January and February 2019.

== Track listing ==
No.	Title	Length
1.	"3 Feet From Peace"	2:10
2.	"The Sun, the Moon, the Truth: "Penance of Self""	3:18
3.	"Married to the Noise"	3:05
4.	"Delinelle"	2:34
5.	"Cave Canem"	2:55
6.	"56"	3:17
7.	"The Inner Authority: "Realization of Self""	2:30
8.	"You Are Free"	2:15
9.	"Doomed by You"	2:15
10.	"The Better Days Before Me"	2:52
11.	"Owed Nothing"	3:20
12.	"Through the Chain Link"	2:36
13.	"The Reach for Me: "Forgiveness of Self""	3:03
Total length:		36:10

== Personnel ==
Stick to Your Guns

- Jesse Barnett – lead vocals, additional guitars, piano
- Josh James – lead guitar, backing vocals
- Chris Rawson – rhythm guitar, backing vocals
- Andrew Rose – bass, backing vocals
- George Schmitz – drums
