= Thicker than Water (album) =

1997 studio album by H2O

Studio album by H_{2}O
- Released: October 7, 1997
- Recorded: June 21–27, 1997
- Studios: Brielle Studios, New York City
- Genres: Hardcore punk, melodic hardcore
- Length: 29:56
- Label: Epitaph Records
- Producers: H_{2}O, Larry Buksbaum, Dean Rispler

H_{2}O chronology
H_{2}O (1996)	Thicker than Water (1997)	F.T.T.W. (1999)

Professional ratings
Review scores
Source	Rating
AllMusic	4/5 stars

Thicker than Water is the second album by American punk band H_{2}O, released on October 7, 1997. It was their first of two albums to be released on Epitaph Records. The album peaked at number 42 on Billboard Top Heatseekers chart in October 1997.

"Friend" is a cover of a song by Marginal Man, a Washington D.C. Dischord Records punk band from the 1980s.

"Everready" and "Thicker than Water" were featured in the video game Street Sk8er.

They did a video for "Everready" with CIV appearing as a news reporter.

== Track listing ==
All music by H_{2}O. Lyrics by Toby Morse, Todd Morse and Rusty Pistachio, unless otherwise noted.

1. "Universal Language" – 0:59
2. "Everready" – 2:11
3. "Talk Too Much" – 1:30
4. "I See It in Us" (Max Capshaw, H_{2}O) – 2:10
5. "Sacred Heart" – 2:15
6. "Innocent Kids" – 0:45
7. "Scarred" – 1:59
8. "Go" – 2:24
9. "This Time" – 2:00
10. "Friend" (Marginal Man) – 1:38
11. "A Plus" – 2:22
12. "Phone Song" – 2:06
13. "Responsible" – 1:35
14. "Wake Up" – 1:06
15. "Thicker than Water" – 2:06
16. "No Fucking Tears" – 2:43
- Track 16 was an unlisted track

== Personnel ==
H_{2}O

- Toby Morse – vocals
- Todd Morse – guitar, vocals
- Rusty Pistachio – guitar, vocals
- Adam Blake – bass, backing vocals
- Todd Friend – drums, backing vocals

=== Production ===
- Recorded June 21–27, 1997 at Brielle Studios, New York City
- Produced by H_{2}O, Larry Buksbaum with Dean Rispler
- Engineered, mastered and mixed (at Sound On Sound, New York City) by Larry Buksbaum
- Pre-production at Loho Studios, New York City
