= The Hope Division =

Studio album by Stick to your Guns
- Released: June 1, 2010
- Genre: Hardcore punk, melodic hardcore
- Length: 45:38
- Label: Sumerian

Stick to your Guns chronology
Comes from the Heart (2008)	The Hope Division (2010)	Diamond (2012)

The Hope Division is the third studio album by American hardcore punk band Stick to Your Guns, released on June 1, 2010, by Sumerian Records.

== Style ==
The album consists of a mix of hardcore punk and melodic hardcore. The melodic aspect is a continuation of sounds the band introduced on 2008's Comes from the Heart, while the traditional hardcore punk is from their older roots. The album also includes spoken word samples of speeches and interviews discussing not giving up hope, a version of "This Land Is Your Land" with the lyrics rewritten to "This land is going straight to hell", and a hidden female-sung folk/country song at the end.

== Critical reception ==
Professional ratings
Review scores
Source	Rating
AbsolutePunk	(89%)
Alternative Press	4/5 stars
The NewReview	4.5/5 stars

The NewReview's Jen Rochester gave the album a 4.5 out of 5 and said "just because Stick to Your Guns sing songs of hope, don't mistake The Hope Division for a cowardly, meek album. It's energy-driven, full of heart, infectious, and intent on motivating you to fight the injustice of a selfish world". Alternative Press's Phil Freeman called the album a "powerful, frequently surprising third outing." Beat called the album "the sound of a band reinvigorated and inspired once again, and nothing like the generic mess of Comes from the Heart some three years ago."

== Track listing ==
All tracks are written by Jesse Barnett.

No.	Title	Length
1.	"Where the Sun Never Sleeps"	3:24
2.	"What Goes Around"	1:38
3.	"Faith in the Untamed"	3:41
4.	"Amber"	3:34
5.	"Wolves at the Door"	3:19
6.	"Some Kind of Hope"	4:16
7.	"Scarecrow"	3:15
8.	"Erida"	1:45
9.	"Life Through Western Eyes"	2:46
10.	"3/60"	3:22
11.	"No Cover"	3:01
12.	"Sufferer" (ends at 4:16; hidden track "La Poderosa" begins at 9:06)	11:37
Total length:		45:38

Digital Edition bonus track
No.	Title	Length
13.	"Inner City International"	2:53
Total length:		48:31

== Personnel ==
- Jesse Barnett – lead vocals, additional guitars, piano
- Reid Haymond – lead guitar, backing vocals
- Chris Rawson – rhythm guitar, backing vocals
- Andrew Rose – bass, backing vocals
- George Schmitz – drums, backing vocals
