= Under the Rug (band) =

American indie rock band

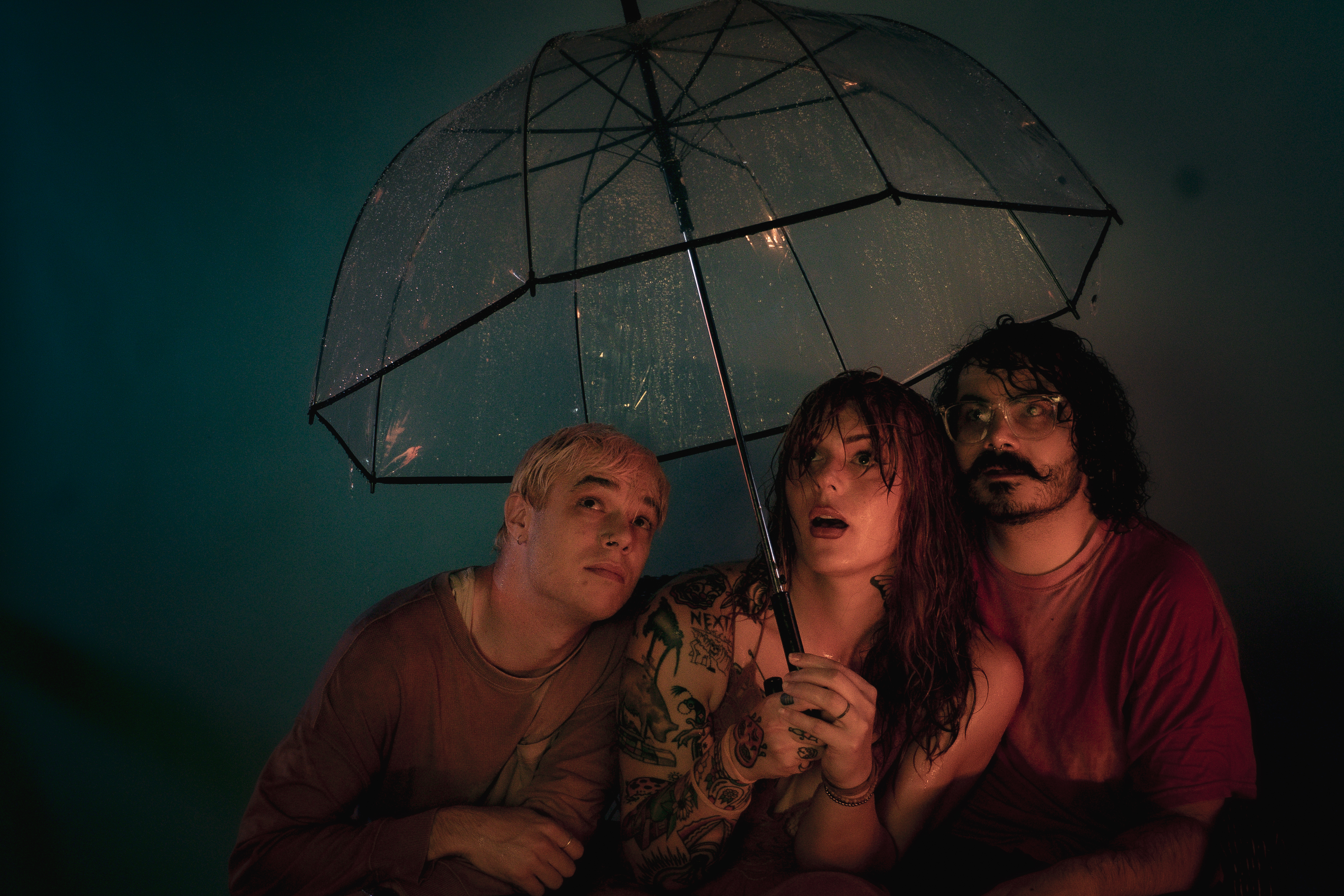

Background information
- Origin: Los Angeles, California, U.S.
- Genres: Indie rock, folk rock, Americana
- Years active: 2010s–present
- Label: Independent

Under the Rug is an American indie rock and folk rock band formed in Los Angeles, California. The group later operated out of Austin, Texas, and is currently based in Portland, Oregon. Since the 2010s, the band has released multiple studio albums, including Dear Adeline (2022), Homesick for Another World (2023), and Happiness Is Easy (2024), and has received coverage from publications including Americana UK, Glide Magazine, Atwood Magazine, and Rolling Stone India. They have toured nationally multiple times while collaborating with artists such as Ariel Posen, Sam Hollander, and Mason Jennings. While sometimes touring with hired musicians, Under the Rug's core members are Cassie Dayan, Sean Campbell, and Brendan McQueeney.

== History ==
=== Early history and formation ===
Under the Rug began as a songwriting collaboration between Cassie Dayan and guitarist Sean Campbell while students at the University of California, Santa Cruz. Drummer Brendan McQueeney soon joined, establishing the trio's core lineup. Bassist Jesse Holsapple was a full-time member for the band's first two releases and some early singles. After a move to Los Angeles, the band recorded and independently released their debut full-length album, Pale King, followed later that year by the EP Too Far Away (2019). After performing in Los Angeles for years, the band relocated to Austin, Texas.

Following the COVID-19 pandemic, the group committed to touring and recording full-time. In interviews, Dayan described an evolution in their music from character-based songwriting toward more personal and emotionally direct material.

=== Dear Adeline (2022) ===
Under The Rug released their sophomore LP, Dear Adeline in 2022. Much of the music was written over a five-year period following the death of vocalist Dayan's mother. In discussing the album's development, Dayan cited influences including The Mountain Goats and Leonard Cohen.

The album was reviewed by Americana UK and Atwood Magazine, noting a blend of folk and indie influences.

=== Homesick for Another World (2023) ===
Homesick for Another World was released in February of 2023. Reviewing the album, Americana UK noted the record's Beatle-esque production.

The lead single "Lonesome & Mad," featured guitarist Ariel Posen on slide guitar. In its premiere of the track's video, Chorus.fm highlighted the collaboration with Posen, while Americana UK singled out the track in its album review.

Shortly after its release, the band began a headlining tour of the United States in support of the album. During their run, they made a live in-studio appearance at WCBE in Columbus.

=== Happiness Is Easy (2024) ===
Under the Rug released Happiness Is Easy in 2024. In interviews with V13 and the CWU Observer, Dayan explained that the record reflected a more personal and less commercially driven creative approach, emphasizing emotional transparency in the songwriting process. The album includes collaborations with songwriter Sam Hollander on three songs, including the lead single "Mad Girl's Love Song", as well as a guest vocal appearance by Mason Jennings on the second part of the record.

In support of Happiness Is Easy, the band began another headlining North American tour across multiple U.S. cities. They also performed a live session for Austin public radio station KUTX as part of the station's Studio 1A series, playing acoustic versions of their material.

== Musical style ==
In an interview with the San Diego Reader, vocalist Cassie Dayan cited influences including Soundgarden, Pearl Jam, and Alice in Chains, describing the band as "like an indie-folk/Americana take on that kind of music."

Reviews of the band's recordings have highlighted their emphasis on vocal harmony and distinctive arrangements. Writing about the group's work, Americana UK noted the band's blend of folk and indie rock elements.

== Members ==
- Cassie Dayan – vocals, guitar
- Sean Campbell – guitar
- Brendan McQueeney – drums, piano

== Discography ==
=== Studio albums ===
- Pale King (2019)
- Dear Adeline (2022)
- Homesick for Another World (2023)
- Happiness Is Easy (2024)
- I'M LOOKING OUT THROUGH THESE EYES BUT I'M IN HERE ALONE (2025)

=== EPs ===
- Too Far Away (2019)
- Three Eighty eight (2026)

=== Selected singles ===
- "Raindrops"
- "Dear Adeline"
- "Go to Sleep"
- "As Long As You're Here"
- "Lonesome & Mad"
