= Go (H2O album) =

2001 studio album by H2O

Studio album by H_{2}O
- Released: May 15, 2001
- Recorded: November 6 – December 2000
- Studio: Rumbo (Canoga Park, California)
- Genre: Punk rock, pop punk
- Length: 37:46
- Label: MCA
- Producer: Matt Wallace

H_{2}O chronology
F.T.T.W. (1999)	Go (2001)	All We Want (2002)

Go is the title of the fourth album released by H_{2}O. It was released on May 15, 2001. This and the All We Want EP are the only releases the band made with the major label, MCA Records. The album peaked at #21 on Billboard Top Heatseekers chart in May 2001.

The last track includes a hidden track of "Like a Prayer", a punk rock cover of the song originally by Madonna. This is their second album in a row to have a cover as a hidden track, with the 7 Seconds cover "Not Just Boys Fun" on their last album, F.T.T.W.. H_{2}O shot a video for "Role Model" and performed "Memory Lane" on Late Night with Conan O'Brien.

Professional ratings
Review scores
Source	Rating
Allmusic	2.5/5 stars
Punknews.org	4/5 stars

== Track listing ==
All songs by Todd Morse unless otherwise noted.

1. "Role Model" – 3:24
2. "Self Reliable" (Rusty Pistachio) – 2:08
3. "Well Behaved" – 3:10
4. "Out of Debt" (Todd Morse, Rusty Pistachio) – 2:48
5. "Memory Lane" (Rusty Pistachio) – 3:27
6. "Ripe or Rotting?" – 2:38
7. "I Want I Want" – 2:47
8. "Songs Remain" – 2:38
9. "Forest King" – 2:22
10. "Shine the Light" – 2:45
11. "Repair" – 2:54
12. "Underneath the Flames" (Rusty Pistachio) – 6:41
  - Contains the hidden track "Like a Prayer" (Madonna)

== Personnel ==
H_{2}O

- Toby Morse – vocals
- Todd Morse – guitar, backing vocals
- Rusty Pistachio – guitar, backing vocals
- Adam Blake – bass, backing vocals
- Todd Friend – drums, backing vocals

Recorded at Rumbo Studios, Canoga Park, CA. in November and December 2000 and mixed in January 2001
