= Todd Morse =

American musician (born 1968)

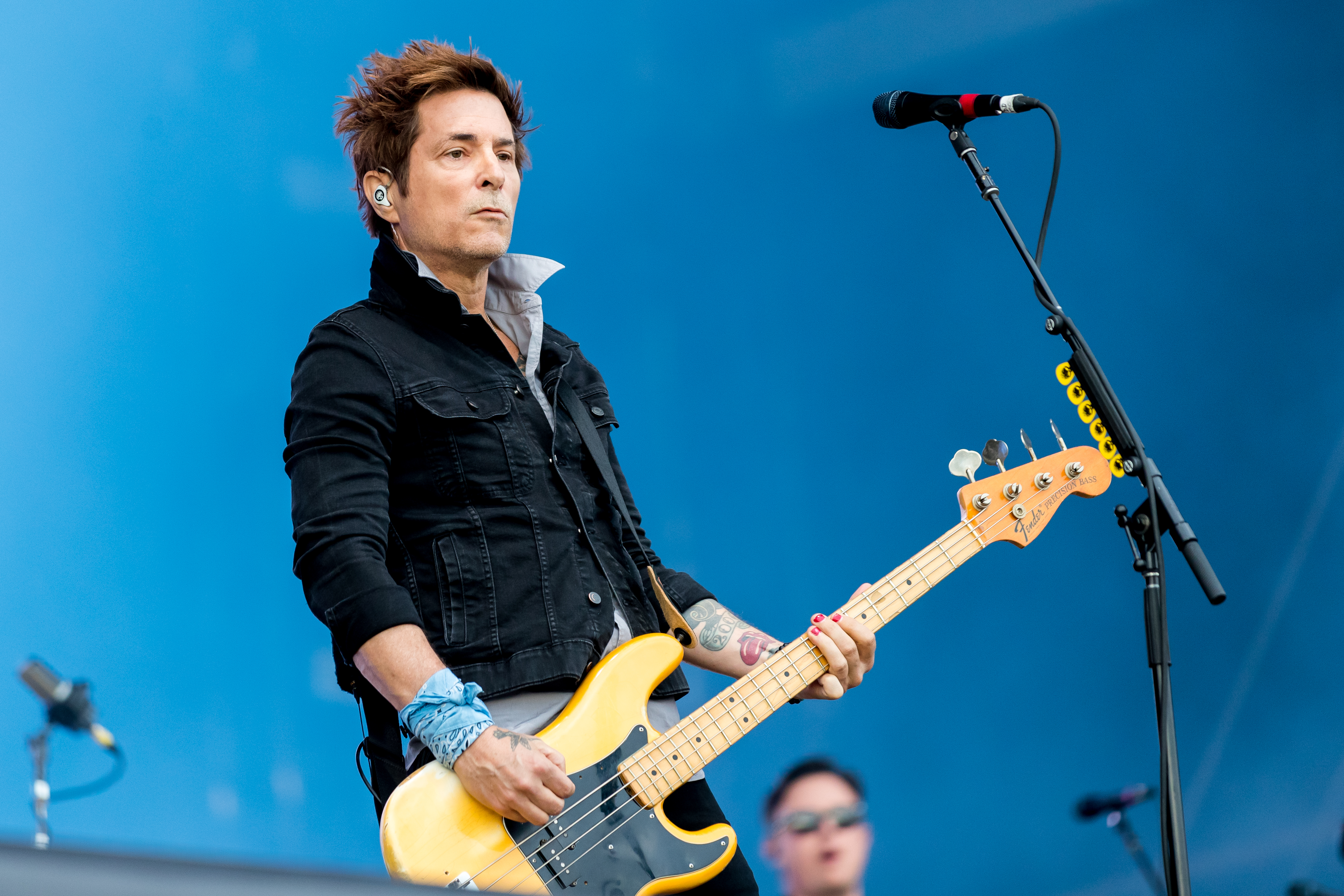
- Morse in 2022

Background information
- Also known as: Dr. Rocco
- Born: January 21, 1968 (age 58); New York City, U.S.
- Genres: Punk rock; melodic hardcore; pop punk
- Occupations: Musician; singer; songwriter; record producer
- Instruments: Guitar; bass; vocals
- Years active: 1995–present
- Member of: The Offspring; The Operation M.D.
- Formerly of: H_{2}O; Juliette and the Licks
- Website: toddmorse.com

Todd Morse (born January 21, 1968) is an American musician best known as the current bassist for the American punk rock band the Offspring and as the former guitarist of the band H_{2}O, in which he played with his brother Toby Morse.

== Early life ==
Morse is the middle child of three brothers. When Morse was five years old, his father died of a rare heart condition, and Morse was raised with the help of his older brother and grandparents as his mother began working at multiple jobs. At an older age Morse and his older brother also raised their younger brother Toby Morse. Morse and his family moved to Newport, and later to St. Mary's County.

== Career ==
In 1995, Morse started his music career when he joined his younger brother Toby Morse as a guitarist in his band H_{2}O at his brother's request. With H_{2}O, Morse has released six studio albums and one live album to date. Morse left H_{2}O in 2015.

After a joint tour with H_{2}O and Sum 41, Morse along with Sum 41 bassist Jason McCaslin, set up the side project The Operation MD. In this band, Morse became the singer, and played guitar and keyboard while McCaslin provided backing vocals, bass and keyboard. The band released two studio albums in 2007 and 2010.

In 2003, Morse joined the band Juliette and the Licks and played on all of the band's records. He left the group in 2008 shortly before breaking up. The band reunited in 2015.

In 2009, Morse became rhythm guitarist for the Offspring on tours. In 2012, Morse did backing vocals for the Offspring's album Days Go By. In 2019, Morse replaced Offspring bassist and founding member Greg K. and became an official member of the band. Even though Morse had joined the band already, he did not appear on the band's album Let the Bad Times Roll (2021), with lead vocalist/guitarist Dexter Holland recording the bass parts on instead. The bass duties for Supercharged (2024) were split by Holland and Morse.

That same year he joined the Offspring full time, Morse released his solo debut album Late Bloomer.

== Discography ==
=== As solo artist ===
- Late Bloomer (2019)

=== With H_{2}O ===
- H_{2}O (1996)
- Thicker Than Water (1997)
- F.T.T.W. (1999)
- Go (2001)
- Nothing to Prove (2008)
- Don't Forget Your Roots (2011)

=== With Juliette and the Licks ===
- You're Speaking My Language (2005)
- Four on the Floor (2006)

=== With the Offspring ===
- Days Go By (2012; backing vocals)
- Supercharged (2024)

=== With The Operation M.D. ===
- We Have an Emergency (2007)
- Birds + Bee Stings (2010)
