= Use Your Voice (H2O album) =

2015 studio album by H2O

Studio album by H_{2}O
- Released: October 9, 2015
- Recorded: March 22 – May 2015
- Genre: Punk rock
- Length: 23:00
- Label: Bridge 9
- Producer: Chad Gilbert

H_{2}O chronology
Don't Forget Your Roots (2011)	Use Your Voice (2015)

Use Your Voice is the seventh studio album by American punk rock band H_{2}O. It was released on Bridge 9 Records on October 9, 2015. The album was recorded from March to May 2015 at Buzzbomb Sound Lab Studios and produced by Chad Gilbert. H_{2}O shot a video for "Skate" in June 2015. On February 15, 2016, the band released a second video for "True Romance" containing pictures of the band's families, friends and fans. The album hit #1 on Billboard Top Heatseekers chart and reached #86 on the Billboard 200 in October 2015.

== Track listing ==
No.	Title	Length
1.	"Black Sheep"	1:49
2.	"Skate!"	1:07
3.	"Thick and Thin"	2:21
4.	"Use Your Voice"	1:29
5.	"Father Figure"	1:48
6.	"From the Heart"	1:51
7.	"Popage"	2:08
8.	"LYD"	1:54
9.	"Still Dreaming"	2:37
10.	"#NotRealLife"	2:13
11.	"True Romance"	2:54
Total length:		23:00

== Personnel ==
- Toby Morse – lead vocals
- Rusty Pistachio – guitars, backing vocals
- Adam Blake – bass
- Todd Friend – drums

Additional musicians

- Steve Caballero – guest guitar solo on "Skate"
- Michael Rapaport – guest speaker on "Black Sheep"

Production

- Chad Gilbert – production
- Paul Miner – engineering

== Charts ==
Chart (2015)	Peak position
U.S. Billboard 200	86
U.S. Independent Albums (Billboard)	19
U.S. Alternative Albums (Billboard)	23
U.S. Hard Rock Albums (Billboard)	13
