= Rotting Out =

American hardcore punk band

- Origin: San Pedro, Los Angeles
- Genre: Hardcore punk
- Years active: 2007–2015, 2018–present
- Label: 6131, Pure Noise
- Members: Walter Delgado; Carlos Morales; Jorge Cabrera; Alfredo Dario Pedrozo; Benjamin Ruiz
- Past members: Michael Craigs: Richard Reyes
- Website: www.rottingoutband.com

Rotting Out is an American hardcore punk band from the San Pedro community of Los Angeles in California.

== History ==
=== Formation (2007–2011) ===
Rotting Out began in 2007 after disbanding from their original band Dogpile. The following year they released their first EP titled This Is Just A Life, via World Won't Listen. In 2009, the band released their second EP, titled Vandalized, via 6131 Records.

=== Street Prowl (2011–2014) ===
In 2011, Rotting Out released their first full-length album under 6131 Records, and the first release with bassist, Walter Delgado, on vocals, titled Street Prowl. In early 2013, the band supported The Ghost Inside on their headlining tour alongside Stick to Your Guns and Stray from the Path.

In April 2013, Rotting Out premiered a new song, titled Blade of Rust from their then upcoming sophomore full-length album. The album, titled The Wrong Way, was released on May 7, 2013, via 6131 Records. On July 12, 2013, Rotting Out released a music video for their song No Clue from their sophomore album. In late 2013, Rotting Out supported The Story So Far on their United States fall tour. In early 2014, Rotting Out announced they were going on a spring headlining tour. The tour consisted of 29 dates across the United States.

=== Touring, Reckoning EP, and break up (2015) ===
In early 2015, Rotting Out announced they were going on a co-headlining 20 date tour with Expire. On January 29, 2015, Rotting Out announced they were releasing their third EP via Pure Noise Records, titled Reckoning. The EP was released on March 9, 2015. On March 22, 2015, the band announced that they had broken up. Walter Delgado, the band's frontman, posted on Tumblr stating "ROTTING OUT broke up last Sunday. Thanks to anyone whoever cared. It was a great ride and a privilege. Don’t ask why. Thank you everyone."

The band were included in the Warped Tour 2015 Tour Compilation, with the song "Born".

The band reformed for one final show on December 12, 2015, in Los Angeles, California.

=== Legal issues (2016–2017) ===
In March 2016, vocalist Walter Delgado was arrested in Ohio for transporting an estimated 70 pounds of marijuana. He pled guilty to third-degree felony possession charges. He started his 18-month sentence on July 22, 2016, and was released on November 17, 2017.

=== Reunion (2018–present) ===
On February 22, the band announced their first show in almost three years, playing the 2018 Sound And Fury festival. On April 23, 2018, it was announced that Rotting Out would be performing for the This is Hardcore Fest in July. On February 18, 2020, the band announced the release of a new album, Ronin, under Pure Noise Records. The lead single, Unforgiven, was released on February 27. The album was released on April 10, 2020.

== Band members ==
Current members

- Walter Delgado – lead vocals (2010–2015, 2018–present), lead guitar (2007–2009), bass (2009–2010)
- Carlos Morales – rhythm guitar (2007–2015, 2018–present)
- Jorge Cabrera – drums (2007–2015, 2018–present)
- Alfredo "Tank" Dario Pedrozo – lead guitar (2009–2015, 2018–present)
- Benjamin "Benji" Ruiz – bass, backing vocals (2010–2015, 2018–present)

Past members

- Michael Craigs – lead vocals (2007–2010)
- Richard Reyes – bass (2007–2009)

Touring members

- Eddie Gallegos – lead guitar (2013–2015)

== Discography ==
=== Studio albums ===
- Street Prowl (2011), 6131 Records
- The Wrong Way (2013), 6131 Records
- Ronin (2020), Pure Noise Records

=== EPs and demos ===
- Demo ‘07 (2007), Self-Released
- This Is Just A Life (2008), World Won't Listen
- Vandalized (2009), 6131 Records
- Reckoning (2015), Pure Noise Records

=== Compilation albums ===
- Americas Hardcore (2010), Triple B Records

=== Singles ===
- "Born"
- "Reaper"
- "Who Am I"
- "Even in His Youth"
