= Toby Morse =

American vocalist

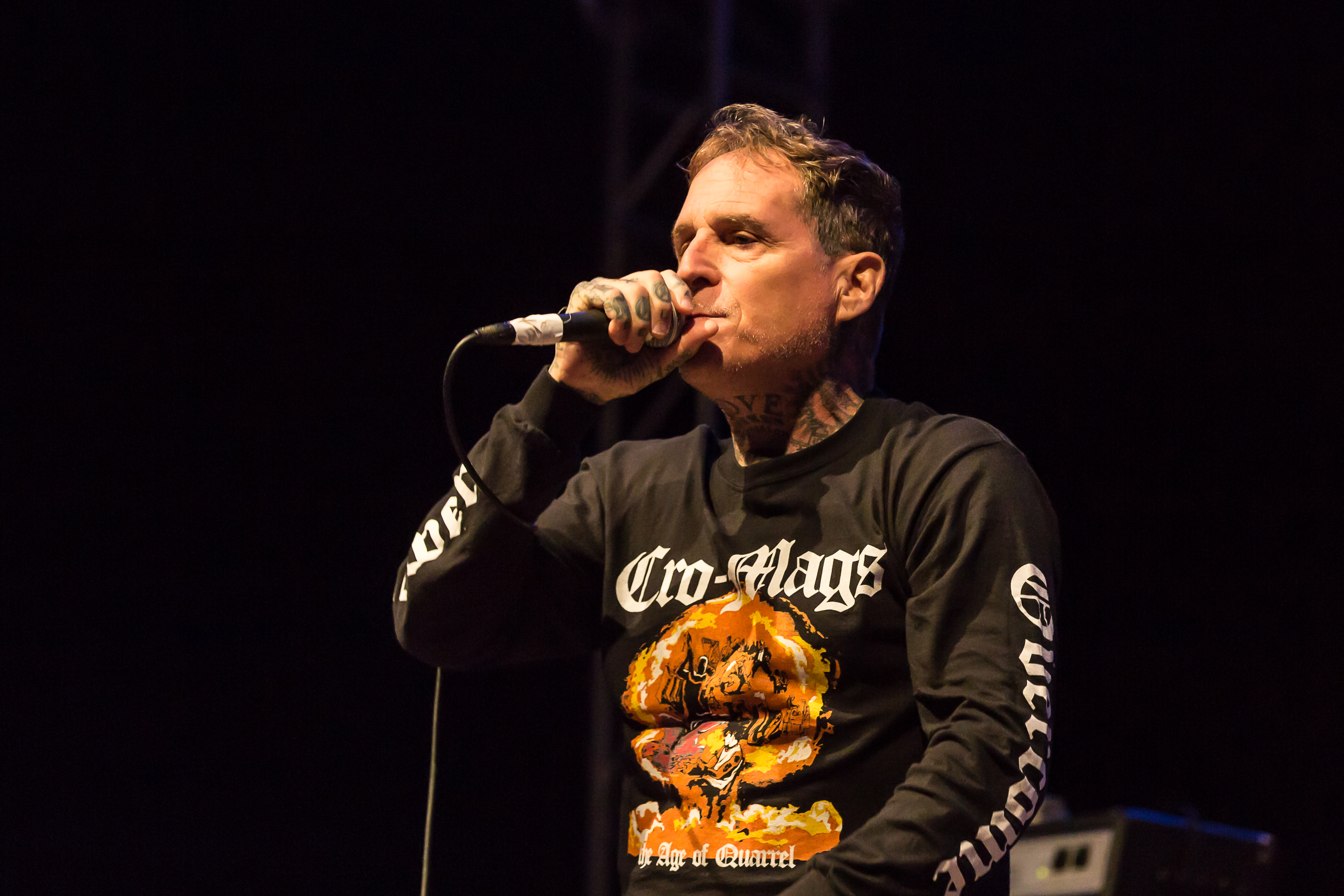
- Morse in 2024

Background information
- Also known as: Toby1
- Born: April 8, 1970 (age 55); Taunton, Massachusetts, U.S.
- Genres: Punk rock; melodic hardcore; pop punk
- Occupation: Singer
- Years active: 1994–present
- Labels: Blackout; Epitaph; MCA; Bridge 9

Toby Morse (born April 8, 1970) is an American vocalist who is best known as the lead singer for punk rock band H_{2}O. He is also one of the vocalists for hardcore punk group Hazen Street.

== Early life ==
Morse was born on April 8, 1970 in Taunton, Massachusetts, the youngest of three siblings. When he was three years old, his father died of a rare heart condition, and Morse was raised with the help of his brothers and grandparents because his mother started to work on multiple jobs. Morse and his family moved to Newport, Rhode Island, and later to St. Mary's County, Maryland. Around the age of twelve, Morse's siblings turned him on to skateboarding and punk music, taking him out to shows of bands such as Descendents and The F.U.'s. They also were having parties at the house, but "seeing the way they acted when they were high or drunk really scared" him. By age thirteen he discovered the song "Straight Edge" of Minor Threat and claimed edge, having never drunk before. Morse graduated from Great Mills High School in 1988.

== Career ==
In 1988, Morse relocated to New York City to be nearer to its hardcore punk scene. That year, he was living in the same house as band Gorilla Biscuits and sang backing vocals on their album Start Today. In 1989, Morse started being a roadie for bands such as Gorilla Biscuits, Killing Time and finally Sick of It All, staying with them for several years. Initially during the soundchecks and then at their shows, Morse would join the group to perform the song "My Love is Real". By then, along with his friends Rusty Pistachio and Eric Rice, he formed H_{2}O, playing their first show in December 1994. They became part of the New York hardcore scene.

In 2004, Morse started collaborating with David Kennedy, best known for being in Tom Delonge's side-project Box Car Racer. Out of this came Hazen Street, which included Toby's friend Freddy Cricien, of another New York hardcore band Madball, as a co-vocalist.

In 2006, Morse started a clothing line called Straight Edge OG (stylized as SXEOG).

=== One Life, One Chance ===
In 2009, Toby Morse founded the nonprofit organization "One Life, One Chance" whose objective is "to inspire kids to make healthy life choices, maintain a PMA, be themselves, and to avoid peer pressure", mainly visiting schools to share the experiences of his early life and as a member of a world-touring band. Its name comes from the song of the same name of the 1999 album F.T.T.W..

O.L.O.C. was prompted by a teacher friend of Morse who invited him to give a talk at a school in Queens, New York City, in early 2009, because her students were fans of H_{2}O, which had a widely positive reception.

Contributors to the organization include Travis Barker, CM Punk, C. J. Wilson, Moby, Hayley Williams and Ethan Suplee, among others.

== Personal life ==
Morse currently resides in Los Angeles with his wife Moon and son Max. In 1988, he became a vegetarian inspired by the song "Cats and Dogs" of Gorilla Biscuits and, as of 2016, he is the only vegan in H_{2}O. Morse is also the only H_{2}O member who has remained straight edge through all their years active.

He is the younger brother of Todd Morse, guitarist for H_{2}O, The Operation M.D. and Juliette and the Licks and bassist for The Offspring.

== Discography ==
=== H_{2}O ===
- H_{2}O (1996)
- Thicker than Water (1997)
- F.T.T.W. (1999)
- Go (2001)
- Nothing to Prove (2008)
- Don't Forget Your Roots (2011)
- Use Your Voice (2015)

=== Hazen Street ===
- Hazen Street (2004)

=== Guest appearances ===
Year	Song	Artist	Album	Source
1989	Various	Gorilla Biscuits	Start Today	
2003	"Falling Down"	Story of the Year featuring Ray Cappo and John Feldmann	Page Avenue	
2009	"2 Hip"	Danny Diablo	International Hardcore Superstar	
2009	"Goodbye Farewell"	Danny Diablofeaturing Natasha Nicholson	International Hardcore Superstar	
2014	"My Armor"	Madball featuring Chad Gilbert and CM Punk	Hardcore Lives	
2015	"RMA (Revolutionary Mental Attitude)"	Stick to Your Guns	Disobedient	
2015	"Never Walk Alone"	Agnostic Front featuring Freddy Cricien and Lou Koller	The American Dream Died	
2025	"Braindead" (Note: Stylized in all caps.)	Papa Roach	Upcoming twelfth studio album	
