= Use Your Voice (Mason Jennings album) =

Studio album by Mason Jennings
- Released: February 10, 2004
- Genre: Folk
- Length: 31:53
- Label: Architect Records and Bar/None
- Producer: Mason Jennings

Mason Jennings chronology
Simple Life (2002)	Use Your Voice (2004)	Boneclouds (2006)

Professional ratings
Review scores
Source	Rating
AllMusic	4.5/5 stars

Use Your Voice is the fourth album by Mason Jennings. It was released in 2004 on Architect Records and Bar/None Records.

== Track listing ==
1. "Crown" – 3:04
2. "The Light (Part II)" – 3:08
3. "Empire Builder" – 2:38
4. "Fourteen Pictures" – 3:07
5. "Lemon Grove Avenue" – 3:52
6. "Keepin It Real" – 3:12
7. "Ballad of Paul and Sheila" – 3:27
8. "Southern Cross" – 3:19
9. "Drinking as Religion" – 2:41
10. "Ulysses" – 3:23
