= Don't Forget Your Roots (album) =

2011 studio album by H2O

Studio album by H_{2}O
- Released: November 14, 2011; November 15, 2011
- Recorded: February–May 2011
- Genre: Punk rock
- Length: 39:13
- Label: Bridge 9
- Producer: Paul Miner

H_{2}O chronology
Nothing to Prove (2008)	Don't Forget Your Roots (2011)	Use Your Voice (2015)

Professional ratings
Review scores
Source	Rating
AbsolutePunk	(70%)

Don't Forget Your Roots is the sixth studio album by American punk rock band H_{2}O. It was released on Bridge 9 Records in 2011. It is a cover album consisting of covers of punk songs by bands who influenced H_{2}O over the years.

The album peaked at number 13 on Billboard's Top Heatseekers chart in December 2011.

== Track listing ==
No.	Title	Writer(s)	Original artist	Length
1.	"Attitude"	H.R., Dr. Know, Darryl Jenifer, Earl Hudson	Bad Brains	1:30
2.	"Satyagraha"	Kevin Seconds	7 Seconds	3:11
3.	"Pride (Times Are Changing)"		Madball	2:21
4.	"Get the Time"	Milo Aukerman	Descendents	3:06
5.	"Said Gun"	Chris Bald, Ivor Hanson, Michael Hampton, Ian MacKaye	Embrace	2:09
6.	"I Wanna Live"	Dee Dee Ramone, Daniel Rey	Ramones	2:39
7.	"Cats and Dogs"	Walter Schreifels	Gorilla Biscuits	1:42
8.	"Someday I Suppose"	Nate Albert, Dicky Barrett, Joe Gittleman	The Mighty Mighty Bosstones	2:56
9.	"Journey to the End of the East Bay"	Tim Armstrong, Matt Freeman, Lars Frederiksen	Rancid	3:11
10.	"Safe"		Dag Nasty	3:04
11.	"Sick Boys"	Mike Ness	Social Distortion	3:13
12.	"Friends Like You"		Sick of It All	1:08
13.	"Train in Vain"	Joe Strummer, Mick Jones	The Clash	2:26
14.	"Scared"		Verbal Assault	4:16
15.	"Don't Forget the Struggle, Don't Forget the Streets"		Warzone	2:22

== Personnel ==
- Toby Morse – vocals
- Rusty Pistachio – guitars and backing vocals
- Todd Morse – guitars and backing vocals
- Adam Blake – bass
- Todd Friend – drums
