= H2O (American band) =

American hardcore punk band

H_{2}O
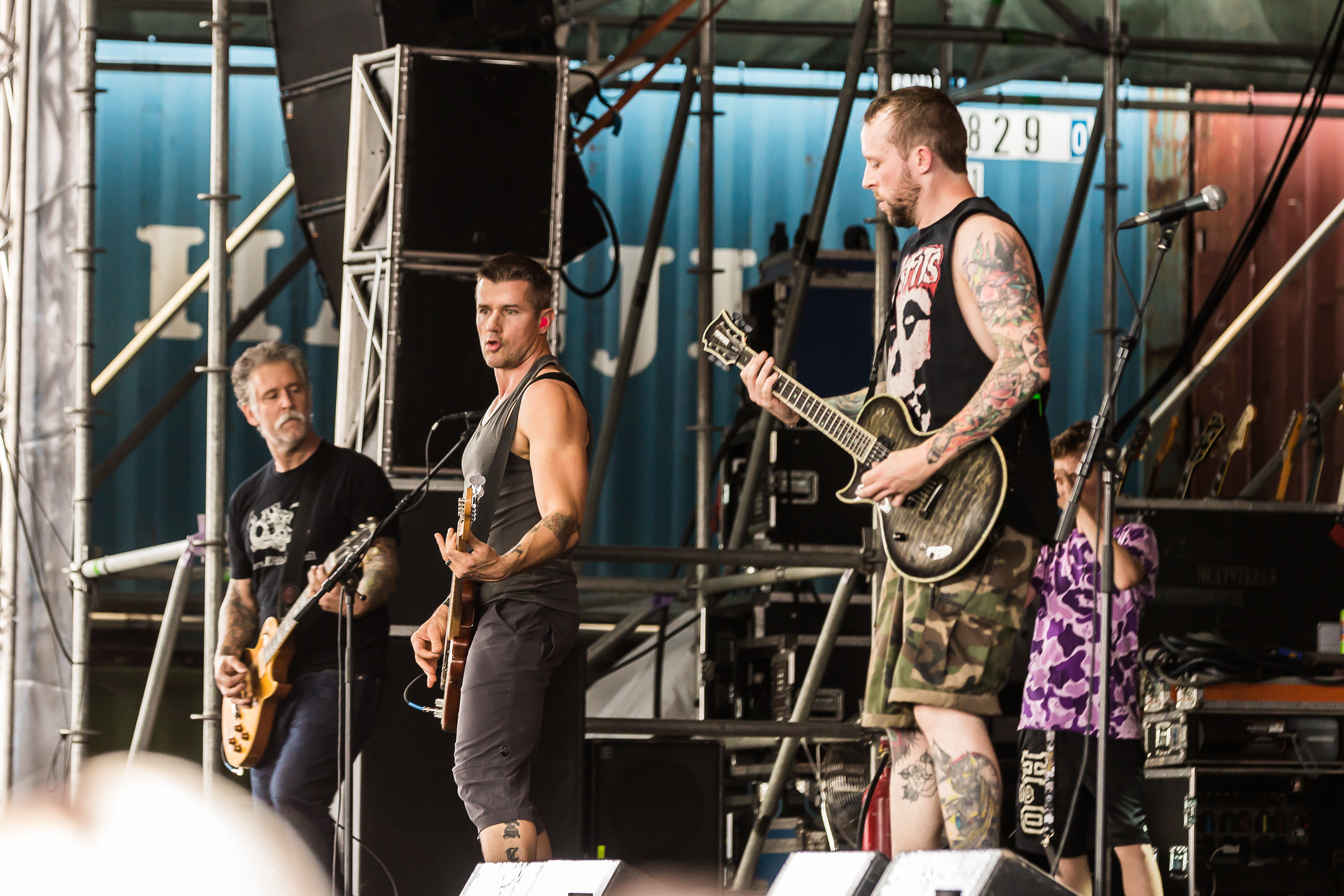
- H_{2}O in 2018

Background information
- Origin: New York City, U.S.
- Genres: Hardcore punk; punk rock; melodic hardcore; pop punk
- Years active: 1994–present
- Labels: Blackout; Epitaph; MCA; Bridge 9
- Members: Toby Morse; Rusty Pistachio; Adam Blake; Matt Henderson; Max Morse
- Past members: Eric Rice; Max Capshaw; Todd Morse; Todd Friend; Colin McGinnis

H_{2}O is an American hardcore punk band formed in New York City in 1994.

== History ==
=== Formation and the Epitaph years (1994–2000) ===
While touring as a roadie for Sick of It All, Toby Morse would sometimes sing with the band during encores. In late 1994 Morse decided to start his own band and formed H_{2}O on the Lower East Side of Manhattan with Rusty Pistachio and Eric Rice. The band included his brother, Todd Morse, and Todd Friend, both formerly members of Outcrowd, who had released the albums New Music Solution (1988), Weathered (1992) and Healer (1994). The band toured relentlessly through most of 1995 and 1996, opening up for almost every hardcore band that hit the east coast, including an opening slot on a Rancid bill, at the Roseland Ballroom, opening for Quicksand on Long Island and a summer 1995 European Tour opening for Sick of It All and CIV. Another huge early show was when the band opened for No Doubt at Tramps (NYC) on Easter in 1996.

In January 1996 H_{2}O recorded their self-titled album at Brielle Studios-NYC, releasing it in May of the same year. The album was basically all the songs they had and would play out at the time. That summer, the band toured with Shelter and Murphy's Law. In October, H_{2}O performed at CBGB's and recorded a video for "Family Tree". They also toured with Social Distortion.

In June 1997 H_{2}O quickly recorded Thicker Than Water, releasing the album in October. They toured all over the world until the end of the year and through 1998. In 1997 the band opened for Misfits, Pennywise, Sick of It All, CIV and The Mighty Mighty Bosstones, and Warped Tour 98 and 99. They toured Japan for the first time in 1997, and again in 1998. They received MTV play with "Everready".

In May 1999, H_{2}O recorded and released F.T.T.W. and made a video for "One Life One Chance." The band again toured (in Europe, Japan and U.S.) year round and into 2000. They also toured on the 1999 Warped Tour (sharing a bus with 7 Seconds). In 1999 and 2000 they would tour with NOFX, The Bouncing Souls, 7 Seconds and Saves the Day. In the summer of 2000, H_{2}O recorded a cover of the Ice Cube song "It Was a Good Day" and shoot a video around New York City in the middle of the night.

=== Go (2001–2003) ===
In November and December 2000 they recorded their first major label album for MCA Records, titled Go. The album was recorded at Rumbo Recorders, a studio in Canoga Park, California owned at the time by 1970s pop stars Captain & Tennille.

Go was released in May 2001 and produced by Matt Wallace (Faith No More, Replacements, Maroon 5) and toured extensively (over 150 to 200 shows in a year) H_{2}O made a video for "Role Model" and performed "Memory Lane" on the Conan O'Brien show in May of that year. They toured Warped Tour with Blink-182, Good Charlotte, New Found Glory and Face to Face and a full Canada tour in 2001. In 2002, H_{2}O recorded and released the EP All We Want, three new songs with two live tracks and the "Role Model" video. They also toured in Japan, Europe and U.S. extensively. They would later tour U.S. and Canada with Sum 41 and Box Car Racer.

=== 2004–2007 ===
In 2005, H_{2}O toured Europe with Madball and toured the U.S. with The Used, Pennywise and Dropkick Murphys. In 2006, H_{2}O toured South America (Brazil, Argentina, Chile and Colombia) for the first time. They toured U.S. with Rancid. H_{2}O also toured Japan in May/June 2007. During this time, H_{2}O would demo songs for what would eventually become Nothing to Prove.

=== Nothing to Prove (2008–2011) ===
H_{2}O returned to the studio in January 2008 to begin working on their fifth studio album and had posted new songs on their MySpace page. On January 14, 2008, the band announced they signed to Bridge 9 Records, and the new album was released on May 27, 2008. Titled Nothing to Prove, it was their first album of new material in seven years. The band proceeded to support the album's release by opening for Rancid on a series of U.S. tour dates at various House of Blues venues. The band would go on to tour Europe extensively that summer.

In March 2008, it was announced H_{2}O would play at the Reading and Leeds Festivals in the United Kingdom.

H_{2}O recently released a DVD titled One Life One Chance. The band also opened for the Dropkick Murphys during their St. Paddy's Day Tour in winter of 2009.

H_{2}O shot videos for "What Happened" and "Nothing to Prove" from the Nothing to Prove CD.

They celebrated their 15th anniversary with tour dates in U.S., Europe, South America, Japan and all over the world in 2010.

In August 2010, H_{2}O played on a boat around Manhattan.

During 2010 South American Tour (Brazil, Chile, Argentina, Colombia and Venezuela). Brian "Mitts" Daniels (Madball guitar player) filled in for Todd Morse because he was on tour with The Offspring.

In February through May 2011, they returned to the studio to begin recording a covers CD of some of their favorite punk bands. They also toured Australia on the Soundwave 2011 tour in late February/March and Europe in April and May 2011.

=== Don't Forget Your Roots (2011–2015) ===
On November 15, 2011, H_{2}O released Don't Forget Your Roots, a 15-song tribute CD to some of their favorite bands.

In March 2015, H_{2}O started recording the album, "Use Your Voice", released through Bridge Nine Records on October 9, 2015.

In April 2015, H_{2}O toured Mexico for the first time. On August 5 the same year, Todd Morse confirmed via his Twitter account that he was no longer a part of the band.

=== Use Your Voice (2015–present) ===
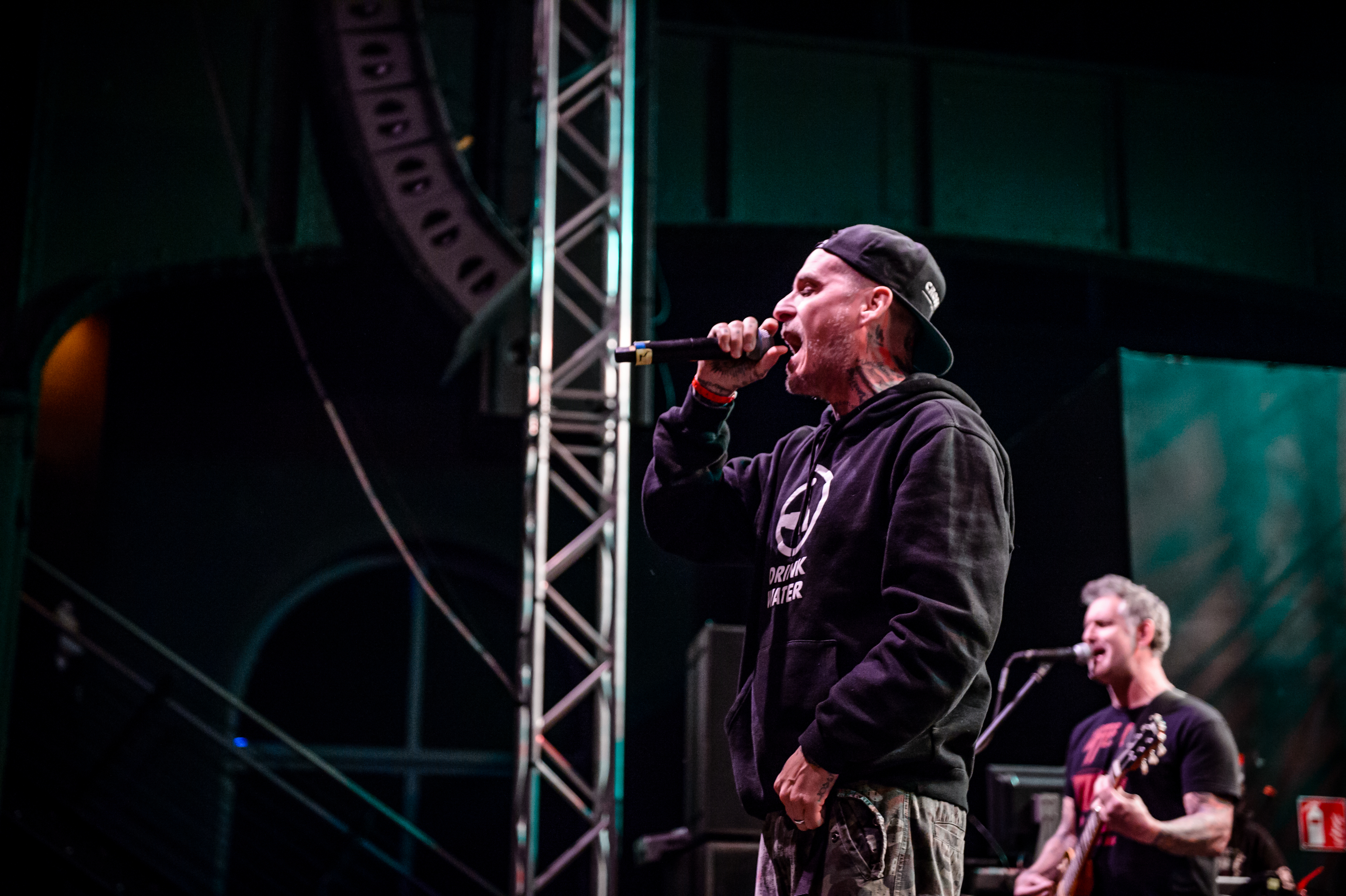
H_{2}O performing in 2017

H_{2}O released Use Your Voice on Bridge 9 Records on October 9, 2015. The album was recorded from March to May 2015 at Buzzbomb Sound Lab Studios and produced by Chad Gilbert. H_{2}O shot a video for "Skate" in June 2015. On February 15, 2016, the band released a 2nd video for "True Romance", containing pictures of the bands families, friends and fans. The album hit No. 1 on Billboard Top Heatseekers chart and reached No. 86 on Billboard chart, No. 23 on Billboard U.S. Alternative Albums, No. 19 on Billboard U.S. Independent Albums chart and No. 13 on the Billboard Top U.S. Hard Rock Albums in October 2015.

On October 6, their new album Use Your Voice was made available for streaming on the Bridge 9 Records bandcamp page.

In October 2015, on the first European leg of their Use Your Voice tour, H_{2}O toured with guest musicians: drummer Branden Steineckert of Rancid, and guitarist Colin McGinniss of None More Black.

In January 2016, H_{2}O embarked on a year of touring. They would start the year on the Persistence Tour in Europe with Ignite, Terror, Iron Reagan, Twitching Tongues, Wisdom in Chains and Risk It!. In April, H_{2}O would do a Mexico tour run of shows with Pennywise. They soon after played the Punk Rock Bowling festivals in Las Vegas and New Jersey. H_{2}O would then tour Europe in 2 parts of the summer. September 2016, H_{2}O left for on a South American tour of Colombia, Peru, Chile, Argentina and Brazil. In November and December 2016, H_{2}O would close out the year performing shows of the 1996 self-titled H_{2}O album, with Todd Morse returning for the run of shows, on the East Coast, West Coast and Midwest.

As of late 2017, Todd Morse was back playing shows with the band

In early 2018, the band announced a full World Tour in celebration of 10 Years of Nothing to Prove as well as playing in Indonesia for the very first time.

In Spring of 2019, H_{2}O would announce 25th Year Anniversary Tour dates, in the United States and Europe.

In January 2020, H_{2}O would tour Europe on the 2020 Persistence Tour. This would be their most recent tour before the COVID-19 pandemic.

== Band members ==
=== Current members ===
- Toby Morse – lead vocals (1994–present)
- Rusty Pistachio – lead guitar, backing vocals (1994–present), rhythm guitar (1994–1995, 2015, 2018–2022)
- Adam Blake – bass, backing vocals (1996–present)
- Matt Henderson - rhythm guitar, backing vocals (2022–present)
- Max Morse – drums (2022–present)

=== Former members ===
- Eric Rice – bass, backing vocals (1994–1996)
- Max Capshaw – drums (1994–1996)
- Todd Morse – rhythm guitar, backing vocals (1995–2015; occasional guest 2015–present)
- Todd Friend - drums, backing vocals (1996–2022: guest 2026)
- Colin McGinnis – rhythm guitar, backing vocals (2015–2018)

== Discography ==
=== Studio albums ===
Title	Details	Peak chart positions			
Title	Details	US Heat.	US Rock	US Alt.	US Ind.
H_{2}O	Released: June 25, 1996; Label: Blackout; Format: LP, CD	—	—	—	—
Thicker Than Water	Released: October 7, 1997; Label: Epitaph; Format: LP, CD	42	—	—	—
F.T.T.W.	Released: May 18, 1999; Label: Epitaph; Format: LP, CD	—	—	—	—
Go	Released: May 15, 2001; Label: MCA; Format: LP, CD	21	—	—	—
Nothing to Prove	Released: May 27, 2008; Label: Bridge 9; Format: LP, CD	7	—	—	—
Don't Forget Your Roots	Released: November 14, 2011; Label: Bridge 9; Format: LP, CD, streaming	13	—	—	—
Use Your Voice	Released: October 9, 2015; Label: Bridge 9; Format: LP, CD, streaming	1	31	23	19

=== Extended plays ===
- This Is the East Coast...! Not LA ! (split with Dropkick Murphys) (2000)
- Live EP (H_{2}O) (2000)
- All We Want (2002)
- California (2011)
- New York City (2011)
- Washington D.C. (2011)

=== 7" ===
- 94–95 Four Song Demo (1994)
- Seveninch (1995)
- Can't Get Off the Phone (1996)
- Everready (1998)
- H_{2}O/CHH split (double 7") (1998)
- Old School Recess (1999)
- It Was A Good Day/I Want More (2001)
- Still The Same Fellas (2008)

=== Music videos ===
- Family Tree
- 5 Yr. Plan
- Spirit of '84
- I Know Why
- Everready
- One Life, One Chance
- Faster Than the World
- It Was a Good Day
- Role Model
- Nothing to Prove
- What Happened?
- Skate!
- True Romance

=== Compilation tracks ===
- The World Still Won't Listen (1996) "Heaven Knows I Am Miserable Now"
- Show & Tell (A Stormy Remembrance of TV Themes) (1997) "Cops (TV Show Theme)"
- Anti Racist Action Benefit CD (1997) "Nazi Punks #### Off!"
- Creepy Crawl Live (1997) "5 Year Plan (Live) – Here Today, Gone Tomorrow (Live)"
- Punk-O-Rama Vol. 2.1 (1997) "Family Tree"
- Punk-O-Rama Vol. 3 (1998) "Everready"
- Punk-O-Rama Vol. 4, Straight Outta The Pit (1999) "Faster than the world"
- Fight The World, Not Each Other – A Tribute To 7 Seconds (1999) "Not Just Boys Fun"
- Short Music for Short People (1999) "Mr. Brett, Please Put Down Your Gun"
- A Compilation of Warped Music II by Side One Dummy (1999) "Old Skool Recess"
- Punk-O-Rama Vol. 5 (2000) "Guilty By Association"
- World Warped, Vol.3: Live (2000) "Faster Than The World (Live)"
- Punk Uprisings Vol. 2 (2000) "Universal Language (Live)"
- Rebirth of the Loud (2000) "It Was a Good Day"
- Warped Tour 2001 Tour Compilation (2001) "Unwind"
- Punk Rock Jukebox (2002) "Friend (alternate take)"
- New Found Glory "Sticks and Stones" Bonus CD (2002) "Static" (later released as "Mitts" on Nothing To Prove)
- Dive into Disney (2002) "It's A Small World"
- Live at Continental Best of NYC Vol. 1 (2005) "Liberate (Continental Best of NYC Vol I.)
- Punk Rock is Your Friend: Kung Fu Records Sampler No. 6 (2005) "Guilty By Association (Live)"
- Scream for Help! (2006) "Family Tree"

=== Movies and DVDs ===
- Faster than the world (VHS) (1999)
- Shooting Vegetarians (1999)
- One Life One Chance (2005)

== Related bands ==
- Hazen Street (Toby Morse)
- Juliette and the Licks (Todd Morse)
- 9 Lives (Rusty Pistachio)
- Images, Dischord Records (Rusty Pistachio)
- Alston (Adam Blake)
- Shelter (Adam Blake)
- Outcrowd (Todd Morse & Todd Friend)
- The Operation M.D. (Todd Morse)
- MidLife Crisis (Rusty Pistachio)
- The Offspring (Todd Morse)
- Aglets (Rusty Pistachio)
