= Victim in Pain =

Studio album by Agnostic Front
- Released: 1984
- Recorded: April 1984
- Studio: Demo Studios (New York City)
- Genre: Hardcore punk
- Length: 15:22
- Label: Rat Cage Records
- Producer: Don Fury

Agnostic Front chronology
United Blood (1983)	Victim in Pain (1984)	Cause for Alarm (1986)

Victim in Pain is the debut full-length studio album by New York hardcore band Agnostic Front. It was released in 1984 on Rat Cage Records and follows the United Blood EP. The album features Rob Kabula and Dave Jones, who replaced Adam Mucci and Raybeez on bass and drums respectively. It is still available as a split album with their subsequent album, 1986's Cause for Alarm.

Eduardo Rivadavia of AllMusic dubbed the album "the ultimate document of the New York hardcore scene". In 2021 Revolver named it to their list of 10 essential New York Hardcore albums.

== Background ==
Agnostic Front was formed in 1980 with Vincent "Vinnie Stigma" Capuccio (formerly of the Eliminators) on lead guitar, with Diego on bass, Rob Krekus (aka Robby Crypt Crash) on drums and John Watson on vocals. They soon added Ray Barbieri, aka Raybeez, on drums and Adam Mucci on bass. After Watson was arrested, the band hired James Kontra as their vocalist, who eventually quit before a performance at Great Gildersleeves after a disagreement with Capuccio about how to hand out stickers. Although never having spoken to him before, Stigma told some of his friends to ask Roger Miret (former bass player of the Psychos) if he wanted to be the vocalist of Agnostic Front, because he liked his style of slam dancing. In 1983, this lineup recorded their debut EP United Blood. The EP was officially released later that year; however by that point, Mucci had departed from the band, and been replaced by Todd Youth.

Roger Miret stated that around the time of writing for Victim in Pain, Todd Youth helped him out with his creativity. By the end of 1983, the group had begun playing songs off of Victim in Pain live as they waited to record the album. However, Youth did not record on the album as they switched members again with Rob Kabula on bass and Dave Jones on drums. With Miret stating, "we just had some growing pains up to that point".

The lineup of Roger Miret, Vinnie Stigma, Rob Kabula and Dave Jones went on to record Victim in Pain.

== Recording and writing ==
When it came to recording the album, Agnostic Front approached Don Fury (who had produced the group's debut EP) to produce the album. Fury agreed to produce the record but wanted to use a 16-track machine during recording, so Agnostic Front held a benefit show at CBGB's with all the funds going to rent the 16-track machine for the album’s recording sessions.

In a 2019 interview, Miret commented on the recording process stating:

It didn’t feel any different recording Victim in Pain than United Blood. Don was experimenting with more sounds, I remember how he mic’d up Vinnie, it was three microphones, one very close to the amp, one in the middle of the room, and one very far back. He was just having fun with it. What should have happened and more important than the whole damn record is someone should have had a damn tuner! At that time NYC was definitely out of tune! That’s the only thing missing from Victim in Pain.

All the songs were recorded live; however, the songs "Fascist Attitudes" and "With Time" were added later on due to the band coming up with them while already in the process of recording. Victim in Pain was recorded over three days in April 1984 at Fury’s Demo studios in Little Italy.

=== Writing ===
For the writing process with Victim in Pain, Agnostic Front were initially writing songs with no intention of making a full album. This style of writing led to the album's short length. All the song's lyrics were written by Roger Miret.

When asked about the albums lyrical content Miret stated:

It was basically an answer to what was going on in the scene at the time. Lyrically, socially and political stuff I saw around me on a day-to-day basis, we were just dealing with life on a one to one. We were living in the moment and that moment was living in a squat on 7th Street, that’s what my lyrics are about, those kinds of moments. And musically was the same way, you know, here’s a fucking song right now and this is it.

== Album cover ==
The album cover features the famous photograph The Last Jew in Vinnitsa. In an interview with the Songfacts site in 2015, band vocalist Roger Miret explained,

"It was a pretty intense photo. But that was the purpose of it. I wanted people to see that and know that it did happen, and it can happen again. And that intense view, that guy just looking at the camera right about the moment he was about to fall into that pit, it was intense. But I just felt that it was appropriate. That person probably never did anything wrong in his life. That was the way it is. That was sad. But we see it happening all over again, don't we?"

Due to the photos nature on some reissues and rereleases the album cover was changed to an embossed logo and title.

== Releases ==
When it came to the album's release, Dave Parsons of Ratcage Records approached the band with them agreeing, being happy they didn't have to pay any money to do the record. Parsons then struck a deal with John Loder in Europe. Loder was initially cautious when it came to releasing Victim in Pain; however, Parsons was able to convince him to release the album. It is unknown how many how many original pressings of the album were released. The album was later rereleased through Combat Core records in 1986, so that the band could raise funds for a national tour. Following the album's release, Agnostic Front embarked on a U.S. tour in support of the album, performing as a supporting act for bands such as the UK Subs and The Exploited. However, the band could not tour internationally due to Cuban-born Miret not having a passport at the time. In a 1991, interview Miret revealed the album had sold over 100,000 copies in the US alone.

The album remained out of print on vinyl for many years until 2009, when Bridge 9 Records reissued the album in celebration of the albums 25th anniversary featuring different cover art. The album was later reissued again in 2019 in celebration of the albums 35th anniversary. In 2023 the album was rereleased again featuring the original album cover an embossed logo and title along with handwritten lyrics.

== Reception and legacy ==
Professional ratings
Review scores
Source	Rating
AllMusic	link
Ox-Fanzine	5/5 stars
Punknews.org	5/5 stars
Ultimate Guitar	9.2/10

Victim in Pain is viewed as an important album for the hardcore genre. Vice wrote that the album "helped define the New York City hardcore punk sound and the title track and "Blind Justice", with vocalist Roger Miret screaming "There's no justice, it's just us", became hardcore skinhead anthems."

A reviewer from Punknews.org stated, "This is the record that kickstarted the whole scene, no question about it, Agnostic Front was the band, Victim in Pain the album, and CBGB the venue. Many say it was one of the first true hardcore releases. Of course there were many bands playing hardcore before AF even formed, many of which were even better than AF, but nobody made music as hard and fast as Agnostic Front in 1984. Bitter music from the streets, about the harsh reality seen every day." Eduardo Rivadavia of AllMusic dubbed the album "the ultimate document of the New York hardcore scene". Ox-Fanzine added that the album is an "absolute genre classics—something one must acknowledge, even if one still harbors reservations regarding the "New York street-dog" variety of hardcore."

Kerrang! described the album as a collection of "short, aggressive tracks" that "rage against social injustice and grinding poverty," while simultaneously battling "stubborn personal demons" and calling for unity within the scene. Since its release, the album has often been imitated, yet no one has ever matched its directness and authenticity.

Vinnie Stigma has called the album "the greatest mistake of his life" stating "I call it 'the greatest mistake of my life'. Because the timing's off, the tempo's off. It was a 16-track recording. At the time, 16-track was a big deal."

The songs title track "Victim in Pain" was featured in the 2008 video game Grand Theft Auto IV on the LCHC (WHERE HARDCORE LIVES) radio station.

In a 2015 interview, Pete Koller of Sick of It All noted that *Victim in Pain* is a "great record" for the listener; however, for a musician, what stands out most is the fact that the band members evidently had not yet fully mastered their instruments at the time of recording. For this very reason, he added, the existence of the record inspired him to start playing music himself.

On February 26, 2010, Agnostic Front reunited their original lineup consisting of Roger Miret, Vinnie Stigma, Rob Kabula, and Dave Jones who had not performed together since 1984. For a special show at the Bell House in Brooklyn, New York, to celebrate the 25th anniversary of Victim in Pain. In the fall of 2019, Agnostic Front toured in celebration of the albums 35th anniversary playing it in its entirety.

In 2018 Revolver dubbed Victim in Pain the 35th greatest punk album of all time. In 2021 they named it to their list of 10 essential New York Hardcore albums stating: "Victim in Pain, put a uniquely cold and fortified thumbprint on the faster punk styles that were bubbling up in D.C. and California. The music was heavier and darker than the sounds that were developing elsewhere in the country, but Roger Miret’s relatable lyrics and enthusiastic delivery were brimming with youthful vigor and true vision for a better, more unified future. It was punk, but with a hardened, New Yorkian flair. NYHC." In 2023, the publication also put the album on their list of the 10 Best Hardcore Albums of the 1980s. In 2026, Rolling Stone ranked it the 79th greatest punk album of all time.

During the albums 40th anniversary in 2024, the Punk Rock Bowling Music Festival held a special celebration and exhibit featuring memorabilia from Roger Miret.

== Tributes ==
- Richard Bruinen (nicknamed Richie Backfire), drummer of the Dutch band Backfire!, had "Victim in Pain" tattooed on his stomach. After his 1999 suicide, Agnostic Front dedicated the song "Bullet on Mott St." to him.
- Fear Factory, along with Freddy Cricien, Roger Miret's younger brother, covered "Your Mistake" on the Demanufacture limited edition release.
- Pro-Pain covered "Your Mistake" on their 2003 release Run for Cover.
- Hatebreed also covered "Your Mistake" on their 2009 release For the Lions.
- F-Minus covered "Victim in Pain" on their 2005 release Won't Bleed Me / Failed Society.
- Philip H. Anselmo and the Illegals covered the song "United and Strong" throughout their summer 2013.
- Grindcore band Napalm Death covered "Blind Justice" on their 2004 covers album Leaders Not Followers: Part 2.
- Crossover band Stormtroopers of Death covered "United and Strong" on the 2007 album "Rise of the Infidels".
- Biohazard covered Power on their 1999 maxi single Switchback.
- Walter Schreifels covered "Society Suckers" on his 2010 solo LP An Open Letter to the Scene.
- Terror vocalist Scott Vogel claimed that the album should be the starting point for anyone first getting into hardcore.

== Track listing ==
No.	Title	Length
1.	"Victim in Pain"	0:48
2.	"Remind Them"	1:04
3.	"Blind Justice"	1:26
4.	"Last Warning"	0:46
5.	"United & Strong"	1:09
6.	"Power"	1:44
7.	"Hiding Inside"	1:20
8.	"Fascist Attitudes"	2:04
9.	"Society Sucker"	1:12
10.	"Your Mistake"	1:34
11.	"With Time"	2:15
Total length:		15:22

== Personnel ==
Band

- Roger Miret – vocals
- Vinnie Stigma – guitars
- Rob Kabula – bass
- Dave Jones – drums

Technical

- Donna Lee Parsons (MIR) - artwork
- Jessica Bard - photography
- Don Fury - production, mixing
