= Cause for Alarm (album) =

Studio album by Agnostic Front
- Released: May 1986
- Recorded: Systems II (Brooklyn, New York)
- Genres: Crossover thrash, hardcore punk
- Length: 23:48
- Labels: Relativity, Combat
- Producer: Norman Dunn

Agnostic Front chronology
Victim in Pain (1984)	Cause for Alarm (1986)	Liberty and Justice For... (1987)

Cause for Alarm is the second full-length studio album by New York hardcore band Agnostic Front. It was released in May 1986 on Relativity/Combat Records and follows 1984's Victim in Pain. The album is still available on a split release with Victim in Pain on the same disc. AllMusic have also stated that Cause for Alarm was “massively influential in the American hardcore scene, as well as providing a key stepping-stone toward speed and thrash metal.”

== Background and style ==
During Agnostic Front's early years they were always on shaky legs due to Roger Miret and Vinnie Stigma's mercurial relationship which led to them tempering with the band's sound. Inevitably, as their musicianship continued to improve, the bandmembers such as drummer Louie Beatto and additional guitarist Alex Kinon began losing some of their raw hardcore sound, and with heavy metal rising in popularity, the group started experimenting with the tightly controlled velocity of thrash metal. This is also the record where lead singer Roger Miret went away from his deep vocals of British Oi! and the shouting instead he experimented with a higher, more metal-influenced voice.

The addition of a second guitarist Alex Kinon led to a more metallic approach, although the songs still had mostly a hardcore sound. One other line-up change was the replacement of Dave Jones by Louie Beatto on drums. The band would further explore the metal sound on their next album, 1987's Liberty and Justice For...

== Recording and album cover ==
The group’s shift toward a heavier musical style created internal friction during this period. Bringing in second guitarist Alex Kinon, formerly of New York hardcore veterans Cause for Alarm (which would serve as inspiration for the album's name) changed the band’s dynamics. Kinon and bassist Rob Kabula strongly favored adding more metal influences to the sound, a direction that clashed with drummer Jimmy Coletti’s preferences. Coletti soon left the band, leading to Louie Beateaux, taking over during recording sessions. Vocalist Roger Miret also briefly left the band, unhappy with the move away from their hardcore roots and dealing with a drug problems and relationship issues. After four months away, Miret returned and reunited with the band to record the album. Due to the struggles the band went through while recording Miret later stated "Cause For Alarm didn’t create itself. We bled for that album."

Vinnie Stigma mentioned the sound change in his 2024 autobiography stating:

When it came time to do Cause for Alarm, we were looking for new ideas. By now, we had the same manager as Carnivore, Crumbsuckers, and Whiplash. We’d heard that Louie Beato and Peter Steele from Carnivore were fans of Agnostic Front. I became friends with Louie, and wound up doing backup vocals on the Carnivore albums. He eventually agreed to play drums on our album because we didn’t have a drummer at the time. That’s how Peter became involved with Agnostic Front, through my relationship with Louie. We used to go out to Brooklyn to rehearse, and Pete helped us out with some lyrics. Their involvement changed our sound a lot, with a lot more metal in there, but it still had the energy AF always had. In the end, I’m glad I made that leap, but honestly, it’s not the album I really wanted to or expected to make.

The recording sessions for Cause for Alarm took place at System II Studios in Brooklyn, New York, where the album was both tracked and mixed. The cover art was done by Sean Taggart who later made similar designs on their 2019 album Get Loud!.

In 2020 Agnostic Front re recorded "The Eliminator" and "Toxic Shock" in celebration of the Eliminator (the Devil figure on the cover art) having an action figure made by Super7 as a part of their ReAction line.

== Critical reception ==
Professional ratings
Review scores
Source	Rating
AllMusic	4.5/5 stars
Kerrang!	3.75 stars on a 5 point scale

Cause For Alarm is viewed as an important album for crossover thrash music. Eduardo Rivadavia of AllMusic stated the album “exposed many metal fans to punk rock for the first time, and vice versa, with songs like "Time Will Come," "Toxic Shock," and "Public Assistance" combining metal's tightly wound precision with punk's raw energy surge.”

Ellis Heasley of Distorted sound magazine added that the album “boldly broke down the seemingly insurmountable barriers between two genres.” He also stated that the Metalcore genre owns “heavy and obvious debt to this record.”

In 2005, Cause for Alarm was ranked number 302 in Rock Hard magazine's book The 500 Greatest Rock & Metal Albums of All Time. Whilst The Village Voice ranked the album at number 8 on its 2013 list of the "Top 20 New York Hardcore and Metal Albums of All Time".

Several critics, including Phil Donahue, Jello Biafra and the fanzine Maximum Rocknroll, have criticized Agnostic Front for the controversial lyrics of the song "Public Assistance", written for the band by then-Carnivore frontman Peter Steele which pointed cruel aim at welfare recipients. Steele went on to write a very similar song for his new band Type O Negative named Der Untermensch, which appeared on their album Slow Deep and Hard.

In 2014 the album was inducted into the Decibel Hall of Fame.

== Track listing ==
No.	Title	Lyrics	Music	Length
1.	"The Eliminator"	Peter Steele	Rob Kabula, Roger Miret	3:10
2.	"Existence of Hate"	Amy Keim	Miret, Vinnie Stigma	2:18
3.	"Time Will Come"	Miret	Miret	1:22
4.	"Growing Concern"	Steele	Alex Kinon, Miret, Stigma	4:10
5.	"Your Mistake"	Miret	Miret	1:26
6.	"Out for Blood"	Miret	Kabula	2:13
7.	"Toxic Shock"	Steele	Kabula, Miret	2:27
8.	"Bomber Zee"	Billy Milano	Kabula, Miret	2:28
9.	"Public Assistance"	Steele	Kabula	2:44
10.	"Shoot His Load"	Steele	Kinon	1:30
Total length:				23:48

"Your Mistake" was covered by Fear Factory, with Freddy Cricien of Madball, on the Demanufacture digipak as a bonus track, and by Hatebreed on their album For the Lions.

== Personnel ==
Agnostic Front

- Roger Miret – vocals
- Vinnie Stigma – guitar
- Alex Kinon – lead guitar
- Rob Kabula – bass
- Louie Beatto – drums

Production

- Recorded at Systems II, Brooklyn, New York
- Produced by Norman Dunn
- Engineered by Mike Maricano
- Written by Peter Steele
