= Outbreak (album) =

Studio album by Outbreak
- Released: November 10, 2009
- Genre: Hardcore punk
- Label: Think Fast!, Trustkill

Outbreak chronology
Failure (2006)	Outbreak (2009)

Professional ratings
Review scores
Source	Rating
Punknews	4/5 stars

Outbreak is the second studio album by Maine hardcore punk band Outbreak. It was released in 2009 on Think Fast! Records.

== Track listing ==
No.	Title	Length
1.	"A Sign of Things to Follow"
2.	"Human Target"
3.	"HL"
4.	"Misdirected"
5.	"Temporary Hype"
6.	"In the Digital World"
7.	"Analyze/Criticize"
8.	"Multiple Personality Disorder"
9.	"Sedate Me"
10.	"(Worki)ing Dead"
11.	"Warning Signs"
12.	"The Countdown Begins"
13.	"Too Paranoid for Politics"
14.	"Don't Want to Fade (To Death)"
15.	"Concealed"
