= Vinnie Stigma =

American guitarist

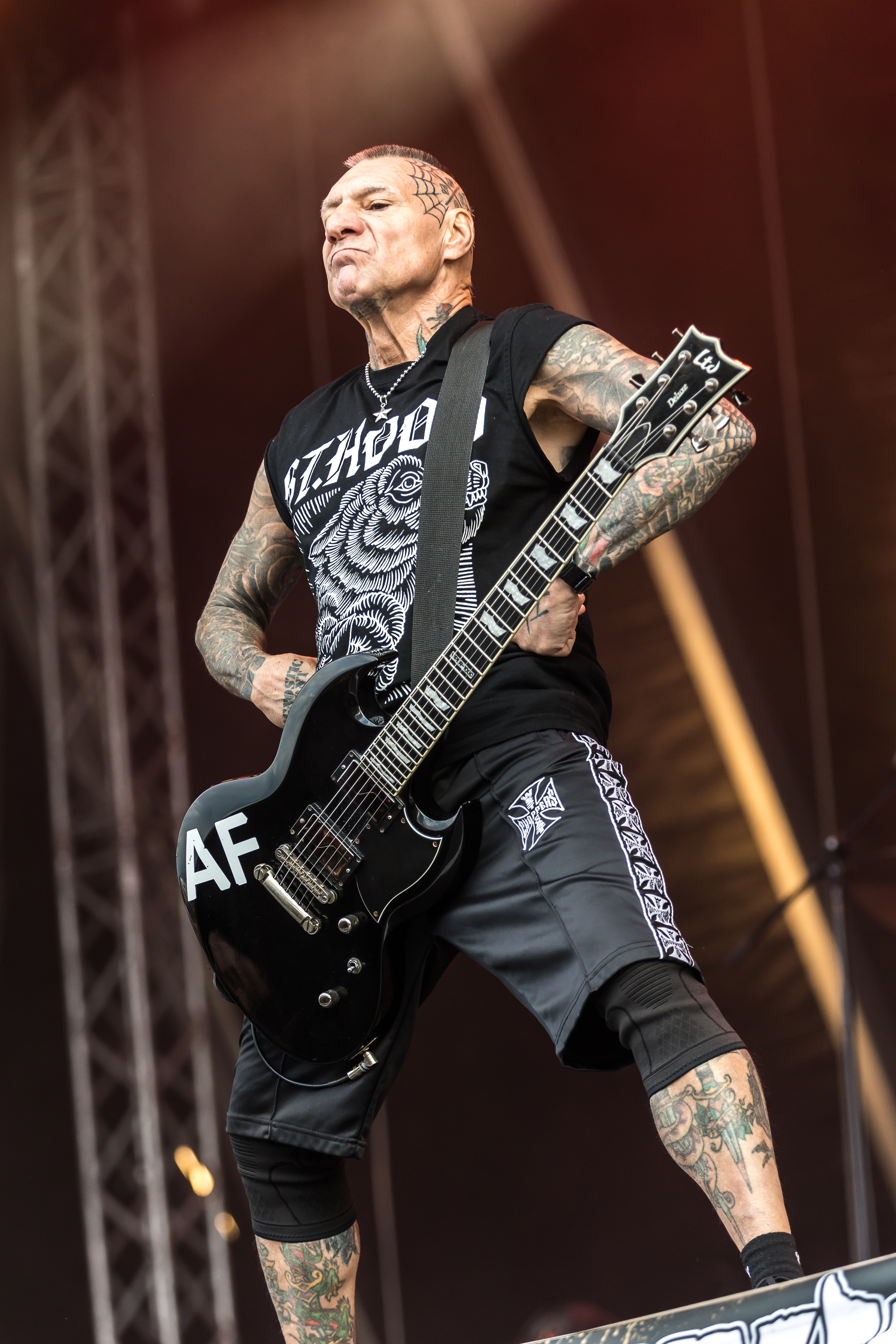
- Stigma with Agnostic Front in 2026

Background information
- Born: Vincent Capuccio; December 3, 1955 (age 70); New York City, U.S.
- Genres: New York hardcore; hardcore punk; crossover thrash
- Occupations: Musician; songwriter
- Instruments: Guitar; vocals
- Years active: 1970s–present
- Member of: Agnostic Front; Stigma
- Formerly of: Madball

Vincent Capuccio (born December 3, 1955), better known as Vinnie Stigma, is an American guitarist and occasional vocalist who is a founding member of the New York hardcore band Agnostic Front. He also has his own solo band called Stigma and was a founding member of Madball, playing with the band from 1988 to 1997. He and his bandmate Roger Miret are often referred to as "the godfathers of hardcore," with Revolver Magazine stating that the two "carried the torch for punk's unapologetic cousin, hardcore, across the globe."

Outside of music, Stigma has taken part in other endeavors, including professional wrestling and acting, and is a published author.

== Early life ==
Stigma was born on December 3, 1955, into a large Italian-American family and grew up in Little Italy, Manhattan, which is now known as Nolita. He and his immediate family all lived in the same apartment complex on Mott Street on the Lower East Side. Growing up, he would play handball and stickball in his apartment courtyard. He and his bands would practice in his grandfather's wine cellar, which was also located in the apartment complex. Growing up, Stigma was a fan of Frank Sinatra and has credited Jimi Hendrix for his inspiration to start playing guitar.

== Career ==
Stigma started out his career with one of the first New York hardcore bands called the Eliminators, where he played bass. The group never recorded any original material; they played all over the U.S. but never gained a substantial following outside of New York.

=== Agnostic Front ===
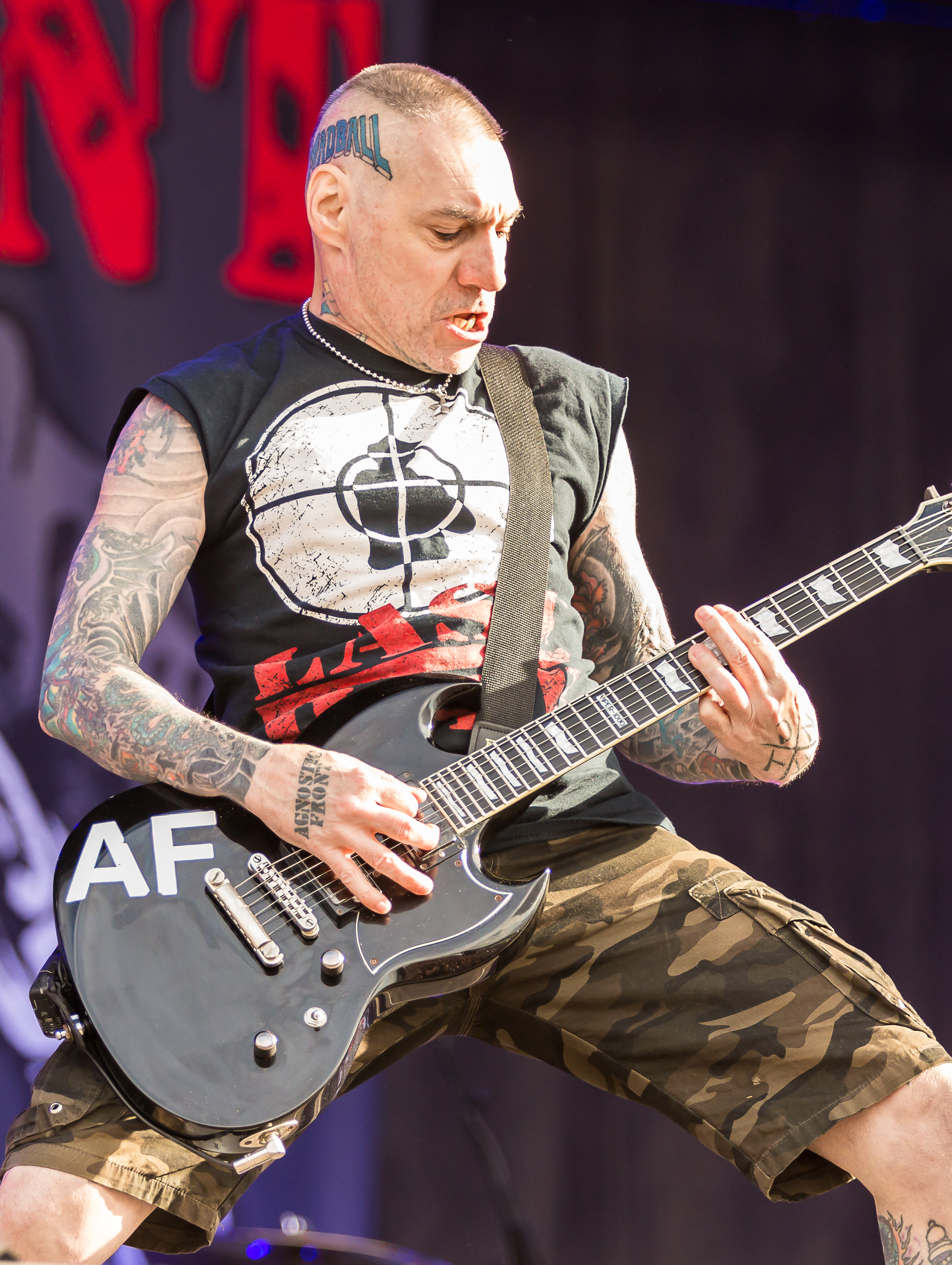
Stigma performing with Agnostic in 2022 during a show in Germany

In 1980 at the age of 25, Stigma helped form a new group with Diego on bass, Rob Krekus on drums, and John Watson on vocals. Despite being billed at their first concert as the Zoo Crew, Stigma introduced them as Agnostic Front, saying that the poster had been made prior to deciding on the name. They soon added Ray Barbieri on drums and Adam Mucci on bass. After Watson was arrested, the band hired James Kontra as their vocalist, who eventually quit before a performance at Great Gildersleeves after a disagreement with Capuccio about how to hand out stickers. Although never having spoken to him before, Stigma told some of his friends to ask Roger Miret (former bass player of the Psychos) if he wanted to be the vocalist of Agnostic Front, because he liked his style of slam dancing. In 1983, the group recorded their debut EP, United Blood.

This was then followed by their debut album, Victim in Pain (1984), which is regarded as a seminal New York hardcore release. Eduardo Rivadavia of AllMusic dubbed it "the ultimate document of the New York hardcore scene." The group's second effort, Cause for Alarm, was released in 1986 and has been described as an "essential piece to the history of crossover music." The group then temporarily disbanded later that year in an attempt to oust Joe Montanaro. Stigma and Roger Miret formed a new incarnation of Agnostic Front over the summer of 1987 and later released Liberty and Justice For and One Voice in 1992. The band's supposed last show was at CBGB on December 20, 1992. The show was recorded for the live album Last Warning which was released by Roadrunner Records in 1993.

However, Roger Miret claimed the band never officially broke up, stating:

"We never really broke up. We just took a break. I'm a father and I felt like I needed to spend more time with my daughter. During that time, I became better at what I do. I became a better technician. When I knew it was time, I got together with Vinnie and it sounded right."

Stigma and Miret reformed Agnostic Front in May 1996 and did a few reunion shows in December 1996. Since then, the band has toured continuously and has released an additional 9 records, the most recent being Echoes in Eternity (2025).

During a Melbourne tour in 2012, Stigma became a local hero when a young child had slipped away from his mother and darted into the road. Stigma reacted immediately, rushing out after him and pulling him out of the path of an oncoming car. He managed to jump clear while holding the child, though the car still grazed his foot. Fortunately, he had boots on and came away with nothing more than a bruised ankle.

In celebration of Agnostic Front's 30th anniversary in 2012, Artist Series Guitar released a limited edition signature guitar named in Stigma's honor.

In 2023, when asked about the subject of retirement, Stigma revealed he had no plans to retire anytime soon, stating, "I'm gonna do this for as long as I can." On December 6th, 2025, Agnostic Front played a special show at Irving Plaza in celebration of Stigma’s 70th birthday.

=== Madball ===
Madball was founded in 1988 and featured most of Agnostic Front's members. Madball consisted of Stigma on guitar, Miret on bass, Will Shepler on drums, and Miret's half-brother Freddy Cricien as the vocalist. The idea for the band can be traced back to the early 1980s when a then 7-year-old Freddy Cricien began touring with Agnostic Front and served as their unofficial mascot. The band's name comes from a nickname Stigma gave Cricien when he was around 11–12 years old.

The group originally played unused Agnostic Front songs; however, in 1989, they released their first EP Ball of Destruction. Their second EP, Droppin' Many Suckers, was released in 1992. During Agnostic Front's hiatus, Stigma continued playing in Madball and recorded their debut 1994 album, Set It Off. Stigma left the band following Agnostic Front's 1996 reunion.

=== Stigma ===
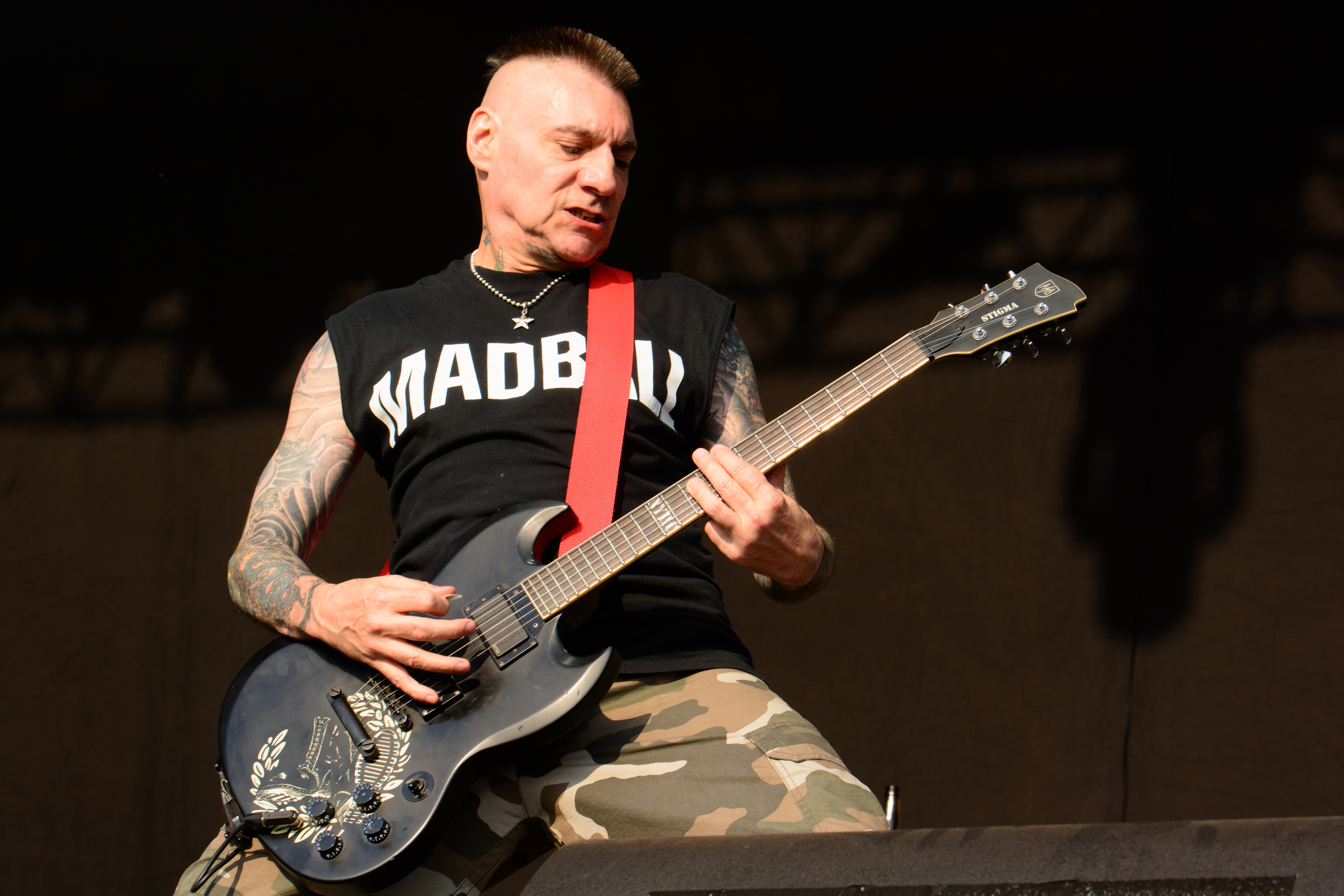
Stigma at Reload Festival in 2016

In 2008, Stigma started a namesake solo project and released his first album, New York Blood, in collaboration with Jamey Jasta, Agnostic Front bandmate Mike Gallo, Lorenzo Antonucci from Sworn Enemy, and Luke Rota from Roger Miret's side project, Roger Miret and the Disasters. In a 2008 interview, Stigma described the project stating "we touch bases on all the musical influences I listen to and enjoy. It's a great blend of hardcore punk, country and just straight up street rock n roll." He then toured in support of the album. In 2013, in between tours with Agnostic Front, Stigma put out a second album titled For Love & Glory. The album was produced by Phil Caivano, Rancid's Lars Frederiksen, and Gallo.

After taking over a decade off from his solo career, Stigma returned with his first Americana album, The Outlaw Vinnie Stigma. The album consists of a collection of cover songs that span several decades of influences, while also including a handful of originals from Stigma. The album was made in collaboration with former One Man Army and US Bombs drummer Chip Hanna, along with additional contributors Jonny Wickersham from Social Distortion, Roy Valencia, and Jesse Wagner from The Aggrolites. Stigma then toured in support of the album, wearing traditional cowboy/wildwest-style clothing during performances. He also played at Lou Koller’s cancer benefit show on February 1, 2026.

== Other interests and projects ==
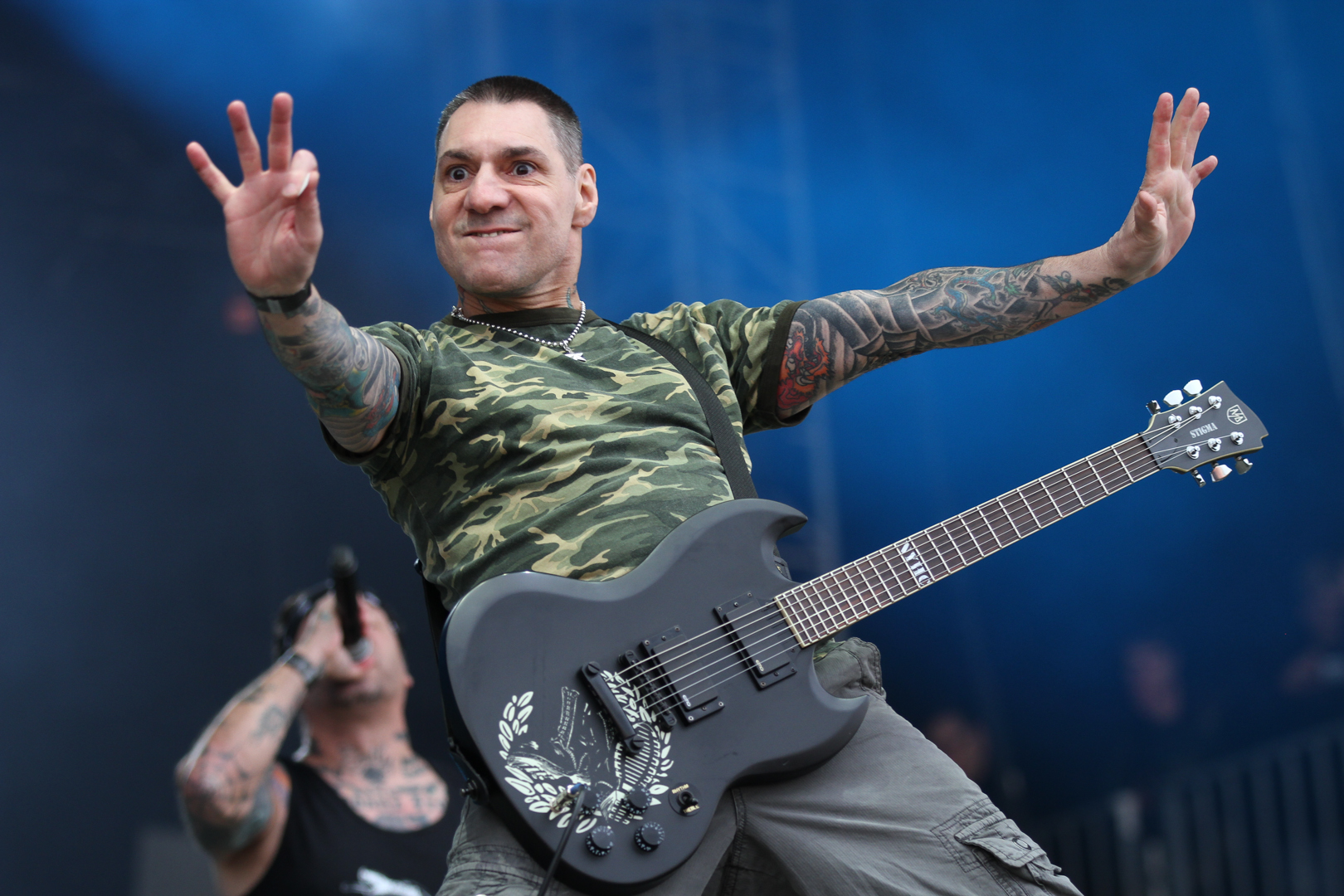
Stigma at With Full Force festival in 2013

In 1986, Stigma appeared on The Phil Donahue Show along with other members of the NYC hardcore punk scene, where he discussed the scene's community and defended its positive aspects against media stereotypes.

Stigma, who has many tattoos himself, opened up his own tattoo shop in New York alongside Jimmy Gestapo of Murphy's Law, called the NYHC Tattoo Shop in 1999. Stigma does not work at the shop but does occasionally give tattoos. For a period of time, Stigma also owned a recording studio on Varick Street in New York.

In 2008, Stigma ran for President of the United States; he released multiple comedic campaign videos explaining his stance on a number of political issues and the kind of president he would be.

Stigma starred as a drug-dealing mobster named Vinny in the 2009 horror film New York Blood.

Stigma has been a pro wrestling fan since his youth and is involved with the sport; his first experience came in a match versus Johnny Valiant, with some of the match taking place in Stigma's tattoo shop. In 2023, he took part in an official independent event in New York in which he was expected to serve in a managerial role. However, it is revealed that he is part of the match itself, getting involved physically. He has since sporadically appeared on the Out Law Wrestling promotion based in Brooklyn.

In 2017, Stigma, alongside Agnostic Front bandmate Roger Miret, appeared in a documentary about the band titled The Godfathers of Hardcore, directed by Ian McFarland.

In 2012, Stigma wrote a children's book titled I Thought You Were My Friend; the book was never officially published. In 2024, Stigma released his autobiography, The Most Interesting Man in the World, which was co-written by Howie Abrams. The book goes over his entire childhood and music career, along with all the other ventures he has delved into.

== Personal life ==
Stigma still resides in the same apartment complex in the Lower East Side that he lived in during his youth.

He is a supporter of the Pittsburgh Steelers.

Stigma enjoys cooking and attended culinary school for a brief period of time.

He takes part in yoga and is trained in mixed martial arts. He credits the sport for helping him keep focus.

== Discography ==
Agnostic Front

- Victim in Pain (1984) Rat Cage Records
- Cause for Alarm (1986) Relativity/Combat Records
- Liberty and Justice For... (1987) Relativity/Combat Records
- One Voice (1992) Relativity/Roadrunner Records
- Something's Gotta Give (1998) Epitaph Records
- Riot, Riot, Upstart (1999) Epitaph Records
- Dead Yuppies (2001) Epitaph Records
- Another Voice (2004) Nuclear Blast Records
- Warriors (2007) Nuclear Blast Records
- My Life My Way (2011) Nuclear Blast Records
- The American Dream Died (2015) Nuclear Blast Records
- Get Loud! (2019) Nuclear Blast Records
- Echoes in Eternity (2025) Reigning Phoenix Music

Madball

- Ball of Destruction (1989)
- Droppin' Many Suckers (1992)
- Set It Off (1994)

Stigma

- New York Blood (2009)
- For Love & Glory (2013)
- The Outlaw Vinnie Stigma (2025)

Guest appearances

- Psycho 69 — “Trip Scene” and “No Space”
- Madball — Hold It Down (backing vocals)
- Roger Miret & The Disasters – My Riot (backing vocals)
- Shutdown – Few And Far Between (backing vocals)
- Payback — “Die Hard”
- Skarhead — “Evil Woman”
- Municipal Waste – "Parole Violators"
