= The Geeks =

South Korean hardcore punk band

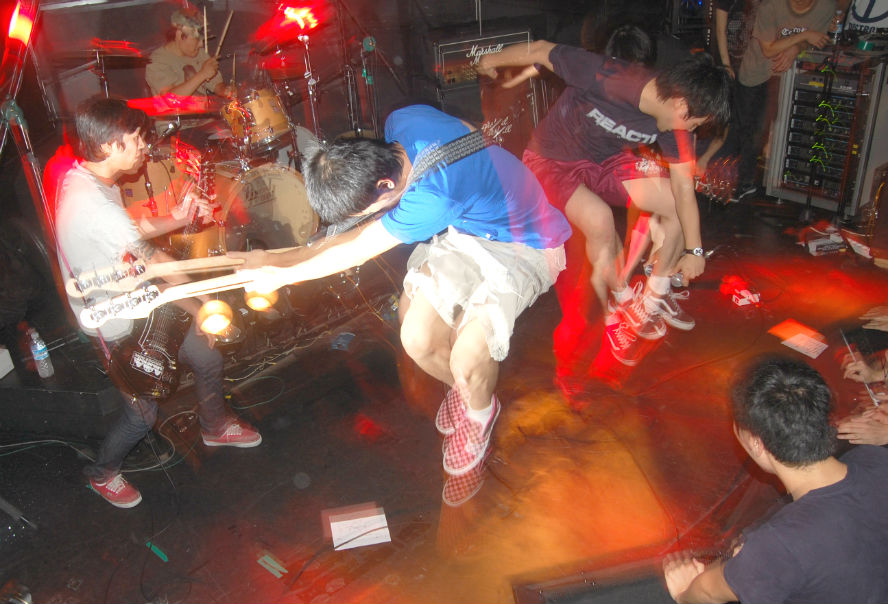
- The Geeks opened for American hardcore band Terror at Ssamzie Space on September 18, 2009.

Background information
- Origin: Seoul, South Korea
- Genres: Hardcore punk; posicore; youth crew
- Years active: 1999–present
- Labels: Think Fast! Records; Townhall Records
- Members: Seo Kiseok; Kang Junsung; Jung Bongkyu; Choi Imyoung; Kim Myoung-gene

The Geeks is a hardcore punk band from South Korea. They were formed in 1999 by schoolmates Seo Kiseok (vocalist) and Kang Junsung (guitarist), shortly after discovering the existence of Korean punk through the Our Nation compilation put out by Drug Records.

== History ==
Due largely to Seo's time living abroad in America, the band signed to Think Fast! Records and is well known in the international hardcore community. They are also associated with Get Outta Town Records, Townhall Records, and GMC Records. Their connections have opened up many opportunities to tour outside of Korea, rare for Korean bands until very recently. They were the first Korean punk band to successfully tour the United States. They have since toured the US numerous times, and in 2007 they went on a world tour taking them to the US as well as Malaysia and Singapore.

The Geeks performed at SXSW in 2013 with a grant from the Korea Creative Content Agency, where they were introduced as K-pop. They appeared in the 2014 documentary film, Us and Them: Korean Indie Rock in a K-Pop World, by Stephen J. Epstein and Timothy Tangherlini, a sequel to their 1999 documentary Our Nation.

Currently, all members of the Geeks have full-time careers, leaving less time for music. Seo works for GM Daewoo and Kang works for an IT company.

=== Critical response ===
The Geeks 2007 Album Every Time We Fall has been reviewed by Scene Point Blank which gave it a 7.5/10 and said:

At the end of the day, The Geeks and their debut full-length Every Time We Fall are much more than a novelty affair. The album is filled with superb music and heartfelt lyrical content. If you’re lucky enough to see The Geeks live, be prepared to stagedive your ass off and scream your lungs out.

=== Straight edge ===
The band originally began as a straight-edge group, with all members abstaining from alcohol. The drinking culture of Korea is very powerful, and Seo struggled to stay alcohol-free in his freshman year of college and his mandatory military service, claiming to have even been nearly attacked for refusing to drink at one time. Despite violence problems in the straight-edge scene in many parts of the world, the Geeks are a non-violent band and have many friends who are alcoholic. Lead vocalist Seo draws an X on the back of his hands in marker to symbolize his straight-edge stance.

Despite their straight-edge reputation, straight edge is not one of the major messages of their lyrics.

Currently, not all of the members are still straight edge.

=== Open Your Eyes and Powwow ===
Seo also founded and co-ran a music promotion agency called Open Your Eyes which brought numerous foreign hardcore bands to Korea, including Champion, Outbreak, Terror, Sick of It All, Down to Nothing, Have Heart, No Turning Back, and Bane.

Through OYE, Seo became one of the primary investors in Powwow, a live club situated near Noksapyeong Station at the base of Haebangchon and Gyeongnidan. The venue closed in 2013.

== Band members ==
- Seo Kiseok (서기석): Vocals
- Kang Junsung (강준성): Guitar
- Kim Myungjin (김명진): Guitar
- Jung Bongkyu (정봉규): Bass
- Choi Imyoung (최임영): Drums

== Discography ==
=== Albums ===
- [2006] Every Time We Fall (Think Fast! Records/CD, Townhall Records/CD, Get Outta Town Records/LP)
- [2014] Still Not In this Alone (Think Fast! Records/LP, Townhall Records/CD)

=== Split albums ===
- [2001] Together As One, Far East Hardcore Split (with In My Pain) (GMC Records)

=== Singles and EPs ===
- [2002] What's Inside (Think Fast! Records/7"EP, Townhall Records/CDEP)
- [2010] Always Classics (Johnny Valley Records)

=== Compilations ===
- [2004] From The Start 1999-2004 (Kawaii Records, Townhall Records)
- [2000] More Than The X On Our Hands - A Worldwide Straight Edge Compilation (Commitment Records)
- [2003] Bridging Oceans - International Straight Edge Compilation (Third Party Records)
- [2003.07.05] We Are the Punx in Korea (#12 "Let It Fade & Live Free")
- [2004] They Came For Your Milk Money (New Music Revolution Records)
- [2006] State of the Scene (Get Outta Town Records)
- [2008.09.16] No Future for You (#9 "이어지는 의지" [Will Lead])
- [2009] Carry The Torch: A Tribute to Kid Dynamite (Get Outta Town/Black Numbers Records)
- [2010] To Us It Was So Much More: Chain Of Strength Tribute (1124 Records)
- [2011] 10 Years Of Think Fast! Records (Think Fast! Records)
- [2011.07.05] Them and Us ("Knowledge" (Operation Ivy cover), "One Spirit")
