= Failure (Outbreak album) =

Studio album by Outbreak
- Released: June 20, 2006
- Genre: Hardcore punk
- Label: Think Fast!, Bridge 9

Outbreak chronology
| Failure (2006) | Outbreak (2009) |

Professional ratings
Review scores
| Source | Rating |
|---|---|
| Punknews | 3/5 stars |

Failure is the first studio album by Maine hardcore punk band Outbreak. It was released in 2006 on Bridge 9 Records.

== Track listing ==
| No. | Title | Length |
|---|---|---|
| 1. | "Down Not Out" | 1:17 |
| 2. | "Handed to You" | 0:30 |
| 3. | "A.S." | 0:48 |
| 4. | "Lessons Learned" | 1:50 |
| 5. | "Test of Time" | 1:03 |
| 6. | "Lost for Words" | 1:00 |
| 7. | "New Beginning" | 0:53 |
| 8. | "Giving Up, Giving In" | 1:12 |
| 9. | "Losing Streak" | 1:57 |
| 10. | "Behind the Screen" | 1:43 |
| 11. | "Built to Break" | 1:12 |
| 12. | "Chewed Up, Spit Out" | 0:55 |
| 13. | "Voices in My Head" | 1:44 |
| 14. | "Restless Minds" | 1:00 |
| 15. | "Wasting Away" | 1:35 |
| 16. | "Square One" | 1:38 |
