= Get Loud! =

Studio album by Agnostic Front
- Released: November 8, 2019
- Studios: Buzzbomb Studios, Orange, CA
- Genre: Hardcore punk
- Length: 30:09
- Label: Nuclear Blast
- Producer: Roger Miret

Agnostic Front chronology
The American Dream Died (2015)	Get Loud! (2019)	Echoes in Eternity (2025)

Get Loud! is the 12th full-length album by New York hardcore band Agnostic Front. It was released on November 8, 2019 on Nuclear Blast. It is the last album to feature drummer Jimmy "Pokey" Mo.

== Background ==
On August 19, 2019 lead vocalist Roger Miret announced on his Facebook that Agnostic Front had finished recording a new album scheduled for a Fall release. On September 13, 2019 the band announced the albums title Get loud! and that it would be released on November 8. In celebration of the announcement, Agnostic Front released an official lyric video for the albums first single, "Spray Painted Walls".

Lead singer Roger Miret commented on the album stating:

So excited for everyone to hear our new record Get Loud! I really love the songs and it feels like a great mixture of what we have done our whole career! We put 100% into this from top to bottom! Everyone involved from start to finished just killed it! See you in the pit to celebrate these songs soon!”

As for the artwork, it seen the return of artist Sean Taggart, who created the cover for their 1986 album Cause for Alarm. The cover art sees the return of all the characters from Cause for Alarm with modern freshness. Miret stated that they decided to have Taggart do the cover art due to the album having an "throw-back vibe."

== Lyrical themes ==
In an interview with New Noise Magazine Miret stated the albums title is about being vocal "It is about stopping living in the same old rut, in the same old circle if you’re not happy. It’s time to make that difference for yourself and get out of the same old routine if it’s not where you want to be – because a lot of people get stuck in those routines."

Lyrically Miret stated that with Get Loud! that he wanted some of the lyrics to be based his autobiography, My Riot, which had just been released around the time of recording. This can be seen on the songs "Urban Decay," "Spray Painted Walls," "Get Loud," and "I Remember." With the rest of the album he went in different directions touching on socio-political themes.

== Critical reception ==
Professional ratings
Review scores
Source	Rating
Blabbermouth.net	8/10
Cryptic Rock	4.5/5
Distorted Sound	8/10
Ox-Fanzine	3.5/5 stars

Don Lawson of Blabbermouth.net wrote "The New Yorkers 12th album feels like a supremely confident re-stating of musical values, with the added sonic weight of a modern production but more than enough rawness and bite to keep things suitably vicious." Adding "Get Loud!" is as potent and memorable an example of the genre as you will ever hear. As they approach their 40th birthday, AGNOSTIC FRONT are still very much not to be fucked with."

Lisa Burke of Cryptic Rock stated "Agnostic Front encompass that vibe in a new healthy way that captures all the knowledge they have gained since their birth. All in all, Get Loud! is New York Hardcore as real and in-your-face as a brisk stroll through the busy streets of NYC. As alive as ever with their brand of ‘kick you in the face’ music."

Ox-Fanzine wrote "It's an interesting album if you delve into the lyrics, whereas musically there are no surprises whatsoever – stagnation at the usual level."

== Track listing ==
No.	Title	Length
1.	"Spray Painted Walls"	2:46
2.	"Anti-Social"	1:07
3.	"Get Loud!"	2;23
4.	"Conquer and Divide"	3:13
5.	"Dead Silence"	2:24
6.	"Af Stomp"	1:30
7.	"Urban Decay"	2:05
8.	"Snitches Get Stitches"	1:48
9.	"Isolated"	1:52
10.	"In My Blood"	2:33
11.	"Attention"	1:50
12.	"Pull the Trigger"	2:01
13.	"Devastated"	2:39
Total length:		30:09

== Personnel ==
=== Agnostic Front ===
- Mike Gallo – bass
- Jimmy "Pokey" Mo – drums
- Roger Miret – vocals
- Craig Silverman – guitar
- Vinnie Stigma – guitar

=== Additional contributors ===
- Roger Miret — producer
- Paul Miner — mixing and mastering
- Geoff Kresge — layout
- Sean Taggart — cover art

== Charts ==
Chart (2019)	Peak position
UK Rock & Metal Albums Chart (Official Charts)	18
UK Independent Albums Chart (Official Charts)	17
