= Youth Attack =

American straight edge hardcore punk band

Youth Attack is an American straight edge hardcore punk band from Worcester, Massachusetts. In 4 years, they released two EPs, one LP, and a DVD.

== History ==
The band was formed by Drummer Nicky Kantarelis, and Vocalist Jeff Hunter when they were only 13 and 14 years old respectively. After self releasing a demo on cassette, they released an EP that came out via Cadmium Sick Records in the United States, and Soviet State Records in Europe. The band was then signed to Think Fast! Records, and released the EP Break the Ice. They achieved notoriety for their live shows, mainly vocalist Jeff Hunter's wild persona, and sometimes offensive antics on stage. At the end of 2004, the band embarked on their first tour, with Have Heart, Guns Up! and Verse.

In 2005, the band released a full length on Think Fast! called Don't Look Back, which featured a heavier and more mature sound, with the addition of new guitarist Alex Kantarelis. When the album came out, they did a full US tour with 1917 Records band Attitude.

In 2006, after playing many more live shows, Youth Attack announced that they would be breaking up, and played their final show on September 23, 2006, at the QVCC in Worcester, Massachusetts, with Have Heart, Verse, Attitude, and The Message. The show was filmed for a Documentary called Youth Attack: 2002-2006, which was released on DVD via Eightfold Path Records, and included the full history of the band, as well as footage from all the bands who played their last show.

== Members ==
=== Final line-up ===
- Jeff Hunter - Vocals (2002–2006)
- Nicky Kantarelis - Drums (2002–2006
- Alex Kantarelis - Guitar (2004–2006)
- Chris Berg - Guitar (2004–2006

==== Past members ====
- Alan Day - Guitar (2002)
- Jackson Massucco - Bass (2002-2004)
- Isaac Ellowitz - Guitar (2002–2004)
- Teddy Petsas - Bass (2002-2003)
- Smalls - Guitar (2005–2006)

== Discography ==
| Year | Title | Label | Format |
|---|---|---|---|
| 2002 | Demo | n/a | Cassette |
| 2003 | Self Titled | Cadmium Sick/ Soviet State | Vinyl 7" |
| 2004 | Break The Ice | Think Fast! Records | Vinyl 7" |
| 2005 | Don't Look Back | Think Fast! Records | Vinyl LP / CD |
| 2006 | Youth Attack: The Documentary 2002 - 2006 | Eightfold Path Records | DVD |
