= Agnostic Front =

American hardcore punk band

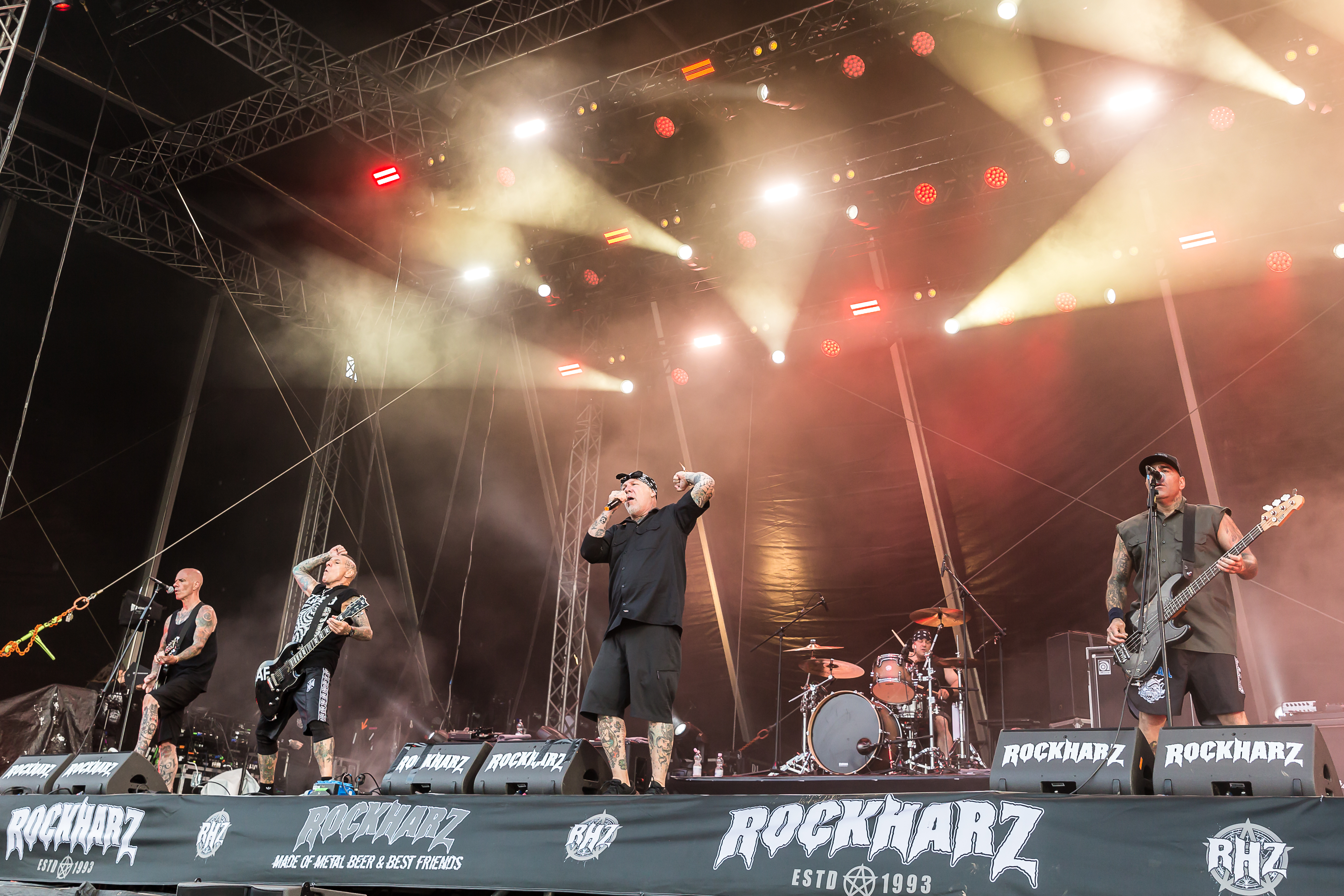
- Agnostic Front at Rockharz 2026

Background information
- Origin: New York City, U.S.
- Genres: Hardcore punk; crossover thrash
- Years active: 1980–1992; 1997–present
- Labels: Last Warning; Rat Cage; Combat; Epitaph; Hellcat; Nuclear Blast; I Scream; Reigning Phoenix
- Members: Vinnie Stigma; Roger Miret; Mike Gallo; Craig Silverman; Danny Lamagna
- Past members: List of Agnostic Front band members
- Website: agnosticfront.com
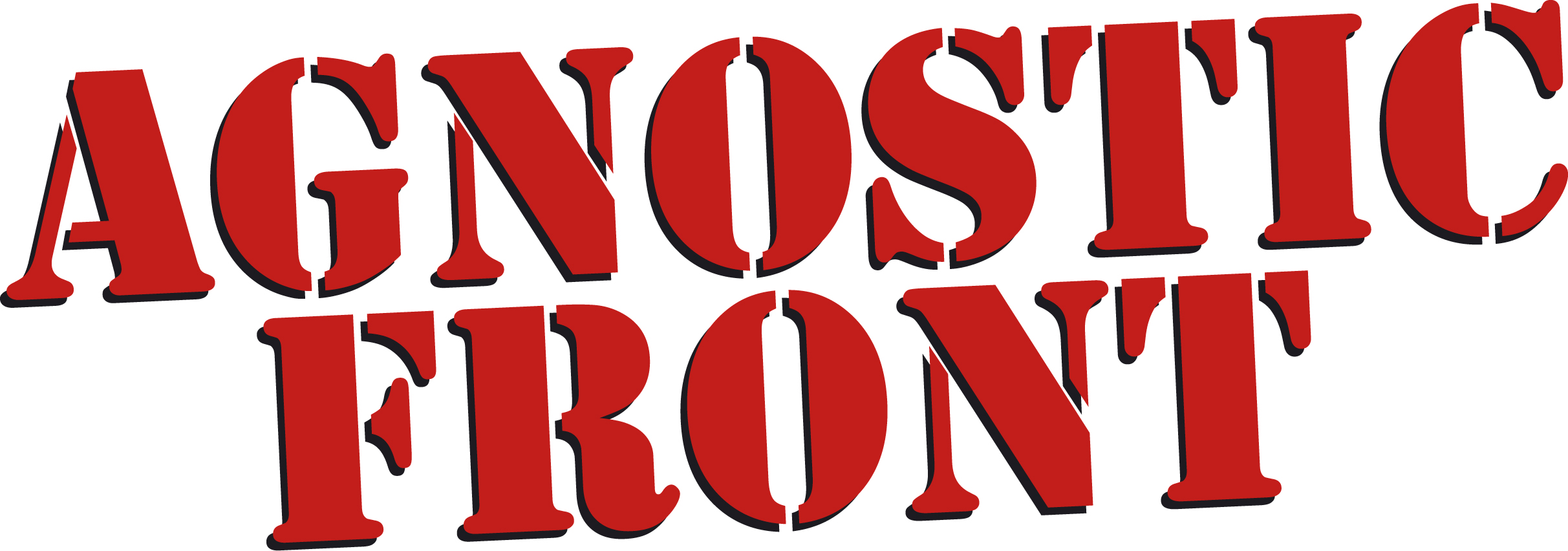

Agnostic Front is an American hardcore punk band from New York City. Founded in 1980, the band is considered an important influence on the New York hardcore scene, as well as a pioneer of the crossover thrash genre.

== History ==
=== First era (1980–1992) ===
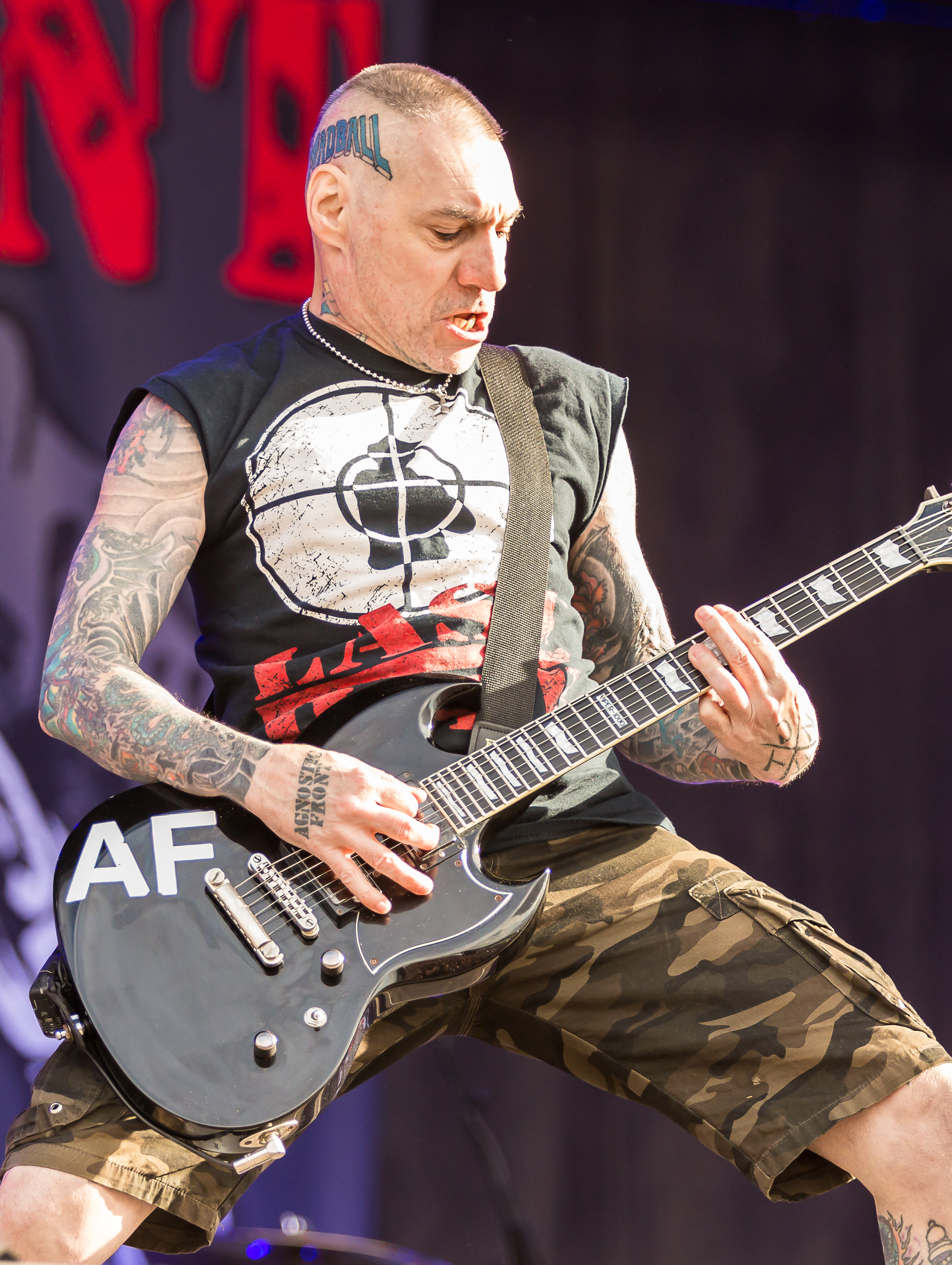
Vinnie Stigma, the band's sole remaining original member

Formed in 1980 with Vincent "Vinnie Stigma" Capuccio (formerly of the Eliminators) on lead guitar, with Diego on bass, Rob Krekus (aka Robby Crypt Crash) on drums and John Watson on vocals. Despite being billed at their first concert as the Zoo Crew, Stigma introduced them as Agnostic Front, saying that the poster had been made prior to deciding on the name. They soon added Ray Barbieri, aka Raybeez, on drums and Adam Mucci on bass. After Watson was arrested, the band hired James Kontra as their vocalist, who eventually quit before a performance at Great Gildersleeves after a disagreement with Capuccio about how to hand out stickers. Although never having spoken to him before, Stigma told some of his friends to ask Roger Miret (former bass player of the Psychos) if he wanted to be the vocalist of Agnostic Front, because he liked his style of slam dancing. In 1983, this lineup recorded their debut EP United Blood. The EP was officially released later that year, however by that point Mucci had departed from the band, and been replaced by Todd Youth. Miret played his first show with the group on April 16, 1983, at Pogo's, in Bridgeport, Connecticut. For the rest of the year they toured New York and New Jersey opening for acts such as Black Flag, Dead Kennedys and Reagan Youth.

During its initial phase, the band consisted entirely of skinheads. Although this would change over time, Agnostic Front would continue to feature skinheads as part of their lineup. This led to a belief among some that the band espoused ultra-nationalist or fascist politics, an assertion denied by vocalist Roger Miret in a 1985 Flipside interview:

"... We're skinheads. And the skinheads in England have a very bad name like with the fascists and stuff like that. But this is America not England. Just because the skinheads are fascists over there doesn't mean we got to grow our hair out if we don't feel like it ... We love our country—but not necessarily how our government works."

They were later accused of racism in the song "Public Assistance" by Phil Donahue in a 1986 show on New York hardcore punk.

In 1983 when Roger Miret's younger half brother Freddy Cricien was about seven years old, he visited with his brother in New York City, shortly after he would begin to go on tour with the band and would sing a few songs during the band's performances which would become a staple of their shows during this period. This led to him becoming the group's unofficial mascot and was given the name "Agnostic Fred". The group would have to sneak Cricien into a drum case to smuggle him into early shows during the 1980s.

Their debut album, Victim in Pain (1984), is regarded as a seminal New York hardcore release. Eduardo Rivadavia of AllMusic dubbed it "the ultimate document of the New York hardcore scene." Agnostic Front embarked on a U.S. tour in support of the album, performing as a supporting act for bands such as the UK Subs and The Exploited. However, the band could not tour internationally due to Cuban-born Miret not having a passport at the time. Dave Jones replaced Raybeez on drums after a mutual agreement among the band members that Raybeez "needed time" to address a developing drug problem. Dave Jones was "a kid from New Jersey" who had previously played with the band Mental Abuse. (Note: In 2013–2014, there was a crowd-funding effort to raise funds for medical treatment for Dave Jones, who "[had] been battling challenging medical issues".) Rob Kabula took over on bass. In 1984, Jimmy "The Kid" Colletti from Justified Violence joined on drums when the band went to tour with the Exploited later that year. The album pushed the band to the forefront of New York's fledgling hardcore scene, which was centered around CBGB, where they played with bands like the Cro-Mags and Murphy's Law. During April and May 1985, the band headlined a US tour.

Prior to recording their next album Miret left AF for a few months at the beginning of 1986, during which time Carl "The Mosher" Demola stepped in. During the band's early years they were always on shaky legs due to Miret and Stigma's mercurial relationship which led to them tampering with the band's sound. Inevitably, as their musicianship continued to improve, the bandmembers such as drummer Louie Beatto and additional guitarist Alex Kinon) began losing some of their raw hardcore sound, and with heavy metal rising in popularity, the group started experimenting with the tightly controlled velocity of thrash metal. This led to 1986's Cause for Alarm becoming a difficult album to record, due to constant lineup changes and personnel problems. Released on Combat Records, it added thrash metal influences. With other bands such as Suicidal Tendencies and Stormtroopers of Death, this album would mark Agnostic Front's foray into the world of crossover thrash. It also featured some lyrics written by Peter Steele and drumming by Louie Beato (both of Carnivore). Miret left the band for four months between the recording and release of Cause for Alarm, and was replaced by Carl Demola. The band then embarked on a tour in support of the album the "Eliminator tour" which went from May 28, to July 26, with G.B.H. serving as main support, and the "Cause for Alarm tour" which took place in the Fall.

Roger Miret and Vinnie Stigma formed a new incarnation of AF over the summer of 1987, enlisting lead guitarist Steve Martin, bassist Alan Peters and drummer Will Shepler. With this new lineup, the band soon released Liberty and Justice For... in 1987. The album featured stripped down punk with a lack of thrash influences, yet it contained many metal-style guitar solos. It did not sell nearly as well as previous releases. Following the release of the album bass player Alan Peters was replaced by Craig Setari. The band then went on "Liberty and Justice For… tour" a North American tour which went from December 1987, to April 1988.

The band's first live album Live at CBGB, was also released that year with was recorded on tour the previous summer. In January 1989, Miret was sentenced to four years in prison for drug trafficking a couple of years earlier. While in prison, Miret began writing new songs while Stigma and the band toured Europe for the first time. Miret was released early in September 1990 after the charges were overturned. At the beginning of the band "Blind Justice" European tour in October 1990, Miret was refused entry to Belgium as he didn't have a valid visa; the band continued the tour, with roadie Mike Shost stepping in as temporary vocalist. They then toured the US to close out the year. The lyrics, written by Miret while incarcerated, formed most of 1992's One Voice, which featured members of Madball and Sick of It All. Miret later stated in a 2011 interview "Those songs told the story of my life. That was pretty damn cool for that reason." During the subsequent touring cycle, Miret was temporarily replaced by his younger brother (and Madball bandmate) Freddy Cricien for a string of shows in July, while he underwent surgery to treat an inguinal hernia.

Agnostic Front toured with Cannibal Corpse, Malevolent Creation and Obituary on the Complete Control Tour from July to September 1992.

In January and February 1993, the band toured Europe alongside Madball. The band's last show was at CBGB on December 20, 1992. The show was recorded for the live album Last Warning which was released by Roadrunner Records in 1993. During the band's hiatus Stigma and Herderson continued playing in Madball with Miret's younger brother Freddy Cricien.

Merit claimed the band never officially broke up stating:

We never really broke up. We just took a break. I'm a father and I felt like I needed to spend more time with my daughter. During that time, I became better at what I do. I became a better technician. When I knew it was time, I got together with [guitarist] Vinnie [Stigma] and it sounded right.

=== Start of the second era (1996–2006) ===
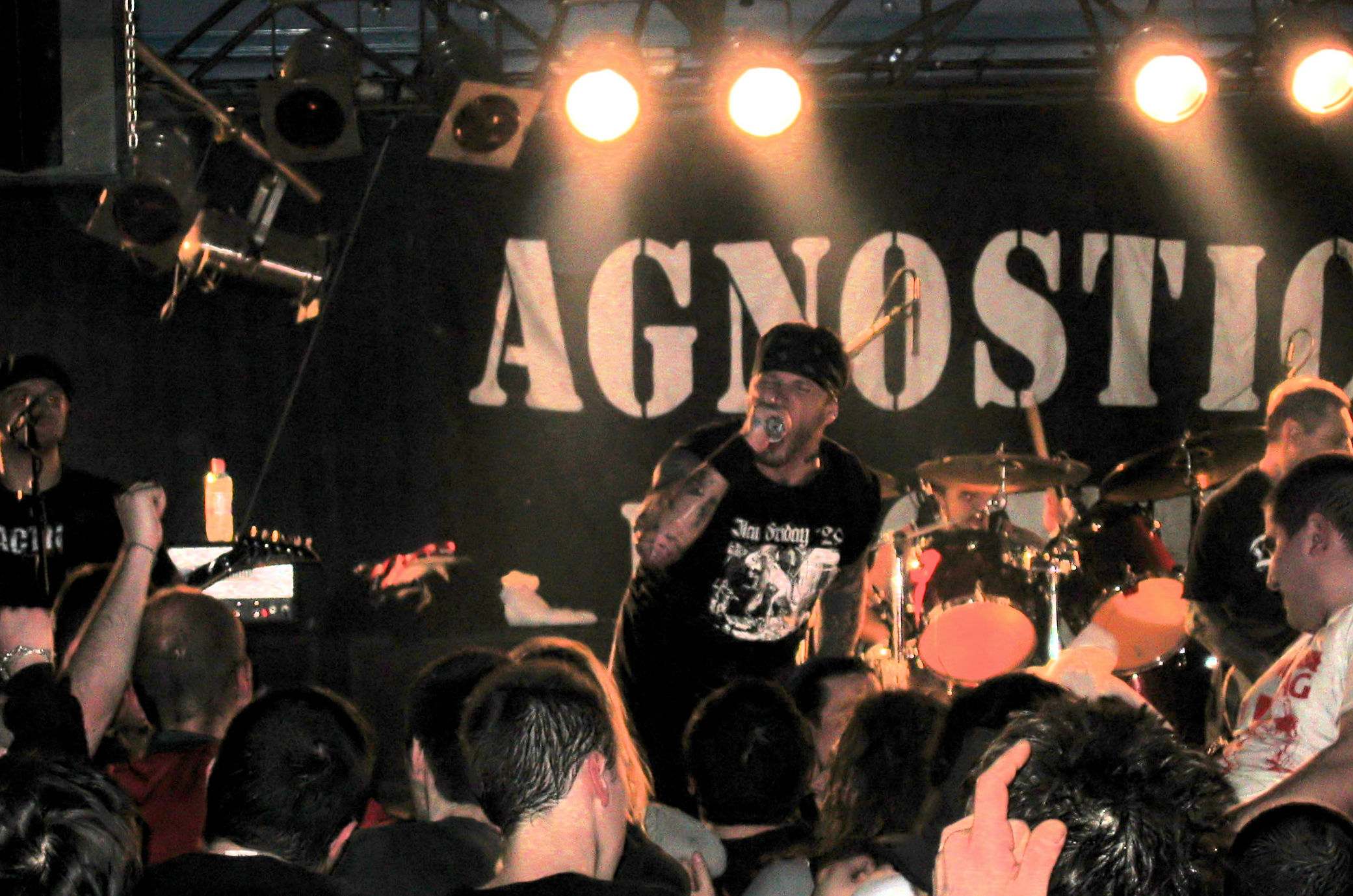
Agnostic Front live in 2005

Stigma and Miret reformed Agnostic Front in May 1996 and did a few reunion shows in December 1996, signing to Epitaph Records and recruiting Jimmy Colletti on drums and Rob Kabula on bass, who was playing with Against the Grain at the time. Their latest venture was titled Something's Gotta Give. In 1999, they followed up with Riot, Riot, Upstart. Their comeback albums have sold well and been mostly acclaimed by music critics for their pure hardcore punk sound. That same year they also released a split with Dropkick Murphys EP titled Unity. In 1999 the group played a few shows at that years Warped tour.

After touring until the summer of 2000, AF briefly took a break to start writing material for a new album during this period, Kabula was replaced by Mike Gallo. Then In 2001, they released the album Dead Yuppies. Songs from this album were rarely played live, as the band considered it more a product of Loved and Hated, Jimmy Colletti's side-project band. The track "Love to be Hated" appears on a volume of Epitaph Records' Punk-O-Rama compilation series, but the band left the label shortly after release and recorded a split live album with Discipline, Working Class Heroes, in 2002, before signing to Nuclear Blast Records.

In 2002, Miret worked on a side-project band, Roger Miret and the Disasters, looking for a sound akin to old-school punk and Oi!. During a European tour in early that year, Colletti was briefly replaced by former drummer Will Shepler after being shot. Also that year, the band appeared in Matthew Barney's film Cremaster 3 along with Murphy's Law. The band continued touring and in late 2003 they joined Unseen and Hatebreed on US tour.

Colletti left permanently in early 2004, being replaced by Gallo's brother Steve, who had previously played a few tours with the band. On November 1, it was announced the band had signed with Nuclear Blast Records, and later that same year, Agnostic Front released their fourth studio album Another Voice. The album was regarded mainly as a follow-up to One Voice. The album, however, did receive some criticism from fans and the press for apparently changing their music to fit the current wave of 'tough guy' bands. Musically, the album bears resemblance to bands that were heavily influenced by Agnostic Front, such as Hatebreed. Miret's vocals on the album particularly seemed to turn off many less hardcore punk-oriented fans. Later, the track "Peace" was contributed to the mash-up album Threat: Music That Inspired the Movie, where it was remixed by Schizoid and renamed "World at War". Agnostic Front then embarked on the "Another Voice" North American and European tours with Death Before Dishonor supporting both legs.

In 2005, Agnostic Front took part in the Unity tour alongside bands such as Terror and Diecast, they also co-headlined a US tour with Full Blown Chaos. In 2006 they released a live album titled Live at CBGB – 25 Years of Blood, Honor and Truth, which was limited to 500 copies. During the Summer they toured Europe alongside First Blood.

=== Warriors and My Way My Life (2007–2011) ===
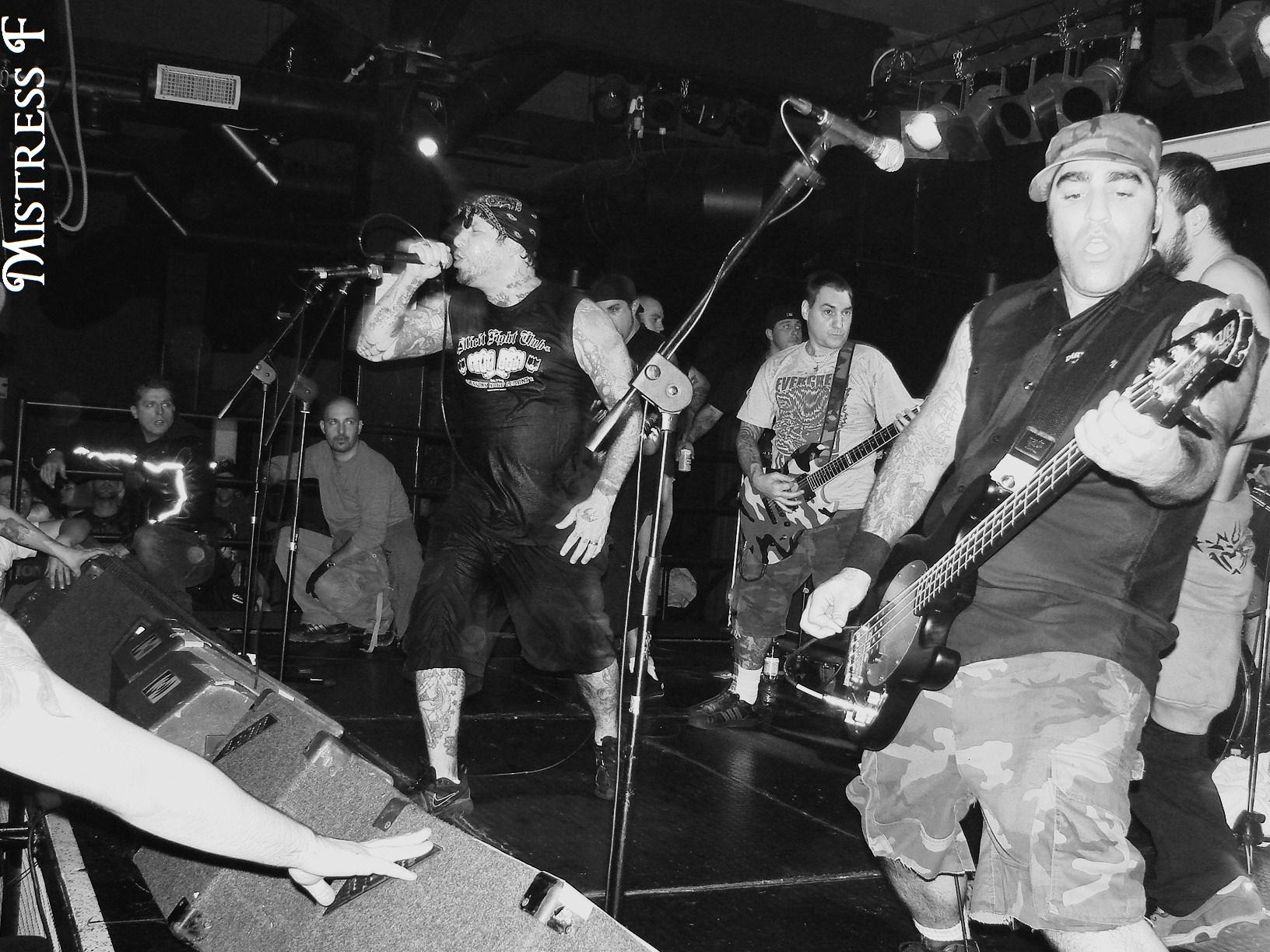
The band performing in Rome in 2007

On March 7, 2006, Agnostic Front released the DVD Live at CBGB. This follows the efforts of many bands that tried to save CBGB from shutting down. Miret claims that "We played more shows at CBGB than any band ever, and we played more benefit shows for CBGB than any band ever" when the club did close, most nostalgia focused on 1970s punk bands.

By the summer of 2006, Di Sclafani had been replaced by Joseph James. On November 6, 2007, Agnostic Front released the album Warriors with the hit "For My Family" which was largely a continuation of the band's crossover thrash sound. Agnostic Front took part in the 2007 Persistence European Tour alongside Hatebreed and Ignite. In 2008, they held their own European and South American headlining tours in support of the album. Vinnie Stigma started a solo project called Stigma that same year.

In March 2009, Steve Gallo was replaced by former Leeway drummer Jimmy "Pokey" Mo. In the Summer of that year the band embarked on a European headlining tour. For the 25th anniversary of their debut LP Victim in Pain, Bridge Nine Records released remastered versions of said album along with their first EP, United Blood, on November 17, 2009. The band performed on the Persistence Tour in Europe in the winter of 2009. In early 2009, Agnostic Front toured the US with Death by Stereo. On February 26, 2010, Agnostic Front reunited their original lineup consisting of Roger Miret, Vinny Stigma, Rob Kabula, and Dave Jones who had not performed together since 1984. For a special show at the Bell House in Brooklyn, New York, to celebrate the 25th anniversary of Victim in Pain. During the Spring they toured Europe with This is Hell, they toured the US for the remainder of the year with bands such as Outbreak and Mother of Mercy. On December 22, it was revealed the band had finished recording their 10th album.

In 2011, Agnostic Front released their ninth studio album, My Life My Way. Metalunderground dubbed the album "one of the bands' best releases to date." Adding My Life My Way "is by far Agnostic Front's greatest achievement. Everything from the catchy riffs, infectious vocals, guitar solos, and gang chants work perfectly in unison and create an incredible New York Hardcore record. Its official, hardcore is back." Agnostic Front toured Australia with Sick of It All, South America with H2O, and Europe with Mongoloids in support of the album.

=== The American Dream Died and Get Loud (2012–2020) ===
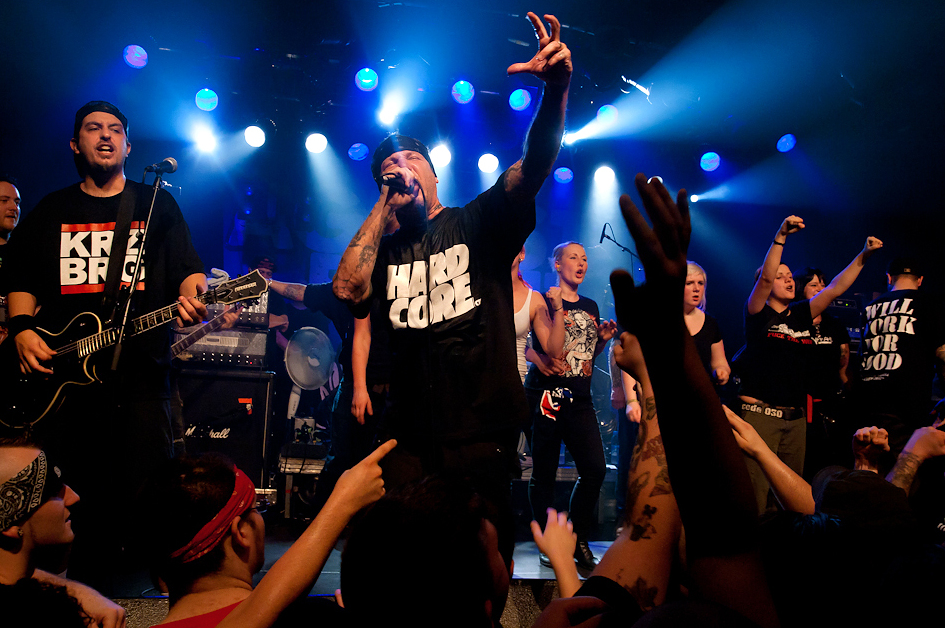
Agnostic Front performing at the SO36 in 2012

In 2012, the group played at the Rebellion Festival in Blackpool, England, they played the festival again in 2014 and 2016. In 2012, the band held three commemorative 30th anniversary shows where they performed the 1989 live recording Live at CBGB in its entirety to paying homage to the New York hardcore subculture. They also embarked on an extensive European tour with Death by Stereo. During an Australian tour in 2012 guitarist Stigma became a local hero when a young child had slipped away from his mother and darted into the road. Stigma reacted immediately, rushing out after him and pulling him out of the path of an oncoming car. He managed to jump clear while holding the child, though the car still grazed his foot. Fortunately, he had boots on and came away with nothing more than a bruised ankle.

In 2013, they once again took part in the Persistence tour alongside co headlining alongside Hatebreed. In May 2014, Joseph James was replaced by Craig Silverman who was a friend of Stigma's and was playing in fellow hardcore band Slapshot. Silverman continued to play in both bands simultaneously till 2019. In November 2014, it was announced the band had begun working on their 11th studio album.

In 2015, the band released the album The American Dream Died via Nuclear Blast Records which consisted mostly of the band's older style of music with a modern touch. Blabbermouth.net scored the album 8.5 out of 10, stating, "Miret and company have engineered another blistering, attention-seizing album with nearly as much venom as Black Flag's 'My War.'" The band continued to tour extensively in Europe as well as the U.S. in support of the record.

In 2016, Agnostic Front continued touring in support of The American Dream Died including a European tour during the Summer. In 2017, Stigma and Miret appeared in a documentary about Agnostic Front, The Godfathers of Hardcore, directed by Ian McFarland. That same year the group also toured extensively in celebration of the group's 35th anniversary. In early 2018 Agnostic Front teamed up with Dropkick Murphys for a North America co headling tour.

On August 19, 2019, lead vocalist Miret announced on his Facebook that Agnostic Front had finished recording a new album scheduled for a Fall release. Then on November 19, Agnostic Front released their tenth studio album, Get Loud. As for the artwork, it seen the return of artist Sean Taggart, who created the cover for their 1986 album Cause for Alarm. The cover art sees the return of all the characters from Cause for Alarm with modern freshness. Blabbermouth.net gave the record an 8/10, stating "Get Loud! is as potent and memorable an example of the genre as you will ever hear. As they approach their 40th birthday, AGNOSTIC FRONT are still very much not to be fucked with." That same year, they also announced a massive North American tour in celebration of the 35th anniversary of their debut LP Victim in Pain with support coming from fellow NYC band Prong. To end the year the band headlined a European / UK tour in November, and toured US with Slapshot in December.

In 2020, they took part in the Final Persistence Tour alongside Gorilla Biscuits and others. They also re recorded both "The Eliminator" and "Toxic Shock" from their 1986 album Cause for Alarm, in celebration of the Eliminator (the Devil figure on the cover art) having an action figure made by Super7 as a part of their ReAction line. In the Spring of that year the group took part in a co-headlining tour with Sick of It All, which was rescheduled to later in the year.

=== Echoes in Eternity (2021–present) ===
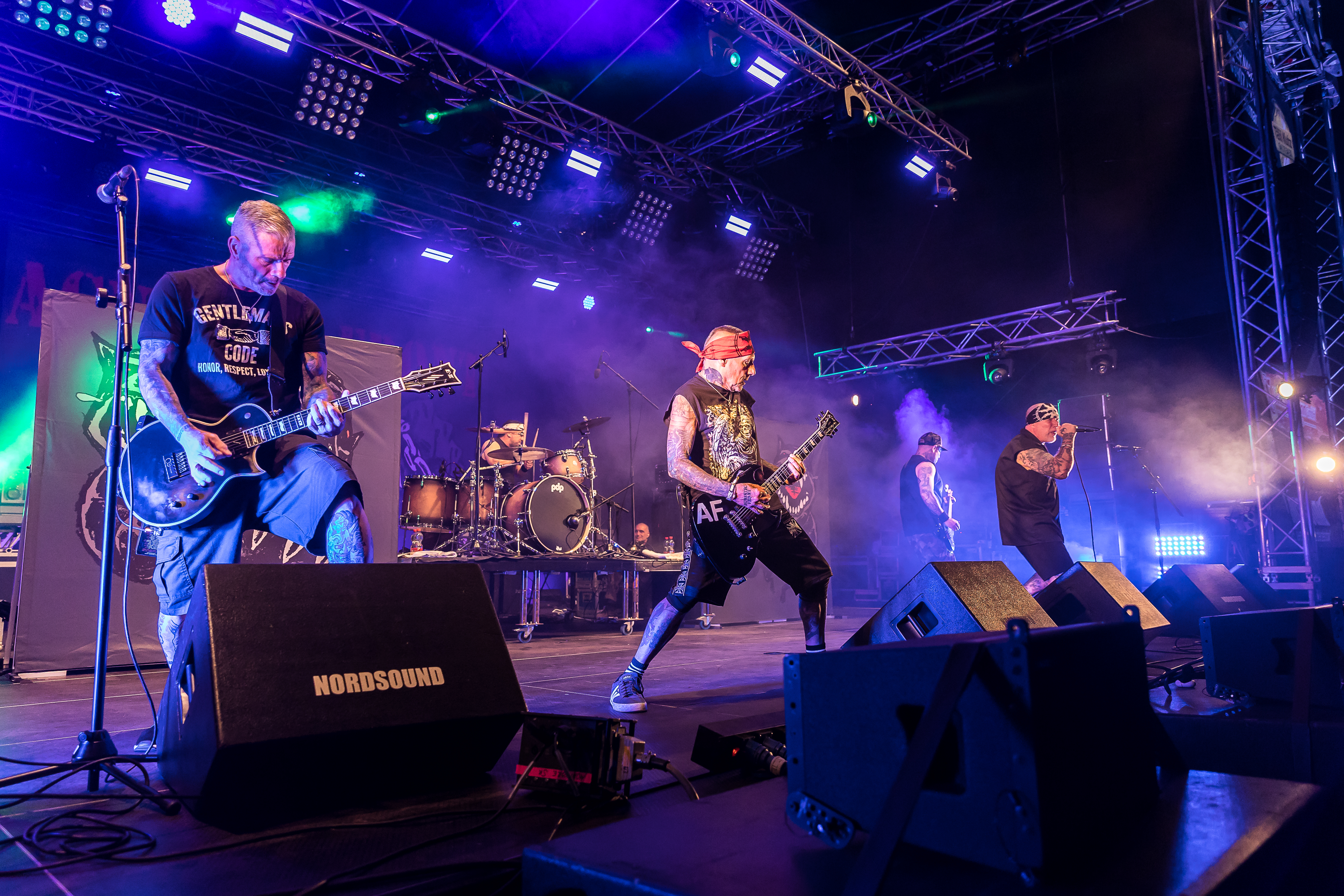
Agnostic Front live in 2024

In September 2021, Miret revealed that he was diagnosed with cancer earlier that year. However, after a lengthy hospital stay and surgery, the cancer is now in remission. A GoFundMe page was launched to help Miret pay for his medical bills, after a successful operation the cancer was completely removed.

After a two-year break due to the COVID-19 pandemic and Miret's cancer diagnosis, AF returned to touring in May 2022 with new drummer Danny Lamagna, who had taken over from Mo following his departure in 2020. That same year, the band once again toured with Sick of It All in the New York United Tour. In December 2023, the band went on a mini East Coast tour alongside Murphy's Law and Grade, in celebration of the 40th anniversary of their EP United Blood. The band continued extensive touring and In December 2024, they announced the New York Blood 2025 Tour alongside the bands Murphy's Law and Violent Way.

In January 2025, the band announced The Last Warning Tour with Bad Religion, with shows planned in Europe, the UK, Spain and Portugal beginning in May 2025. In April 2025, it was announced that the band would be playing at Riot Fest in Chicago in September 2025. On July, 22 it was announced the band had signed with Phoenix Music to release their next album they also went on a US tour with Murphy's Law and Strung Out in the Fall of that year.

In September 2025, the band announced their new album Echoes in Eternity. The album was released on November 7, 2025. Echoes in Eternity has received many positive reviews since its release. Don Lawson of Blabbermouth.net gave the album an 8/10 stating "Echoes in Eternity is as definitive a hardcore experience as anyone is likely to get in 2025. Sometimes, it takes the masters to raise the alarm, and here it is, ringing with deafening assurance." The album peaked at No. 33 in Germany and No. 100 in Switzerland. The band announced an East Coast tour beginning in December 2025 alongside Raw Brigade and Violent. The group played a special show in celebration of Vinnie Stigma's 70th birthday December 6 at Irving Plaza. In February 2026, they will go on a European tour in support of the album. That same month, the band was confirmed to be on the roster for the Louder Than Life festival taking place in Louisville in September. During the Summer the band embarked on an extensive European / UK tour, and also co headlined a US tour with Angle dust during the Fall. On October 17, 2026, they opened for Slapshot during their farewell show.

== Musical style and influences ==
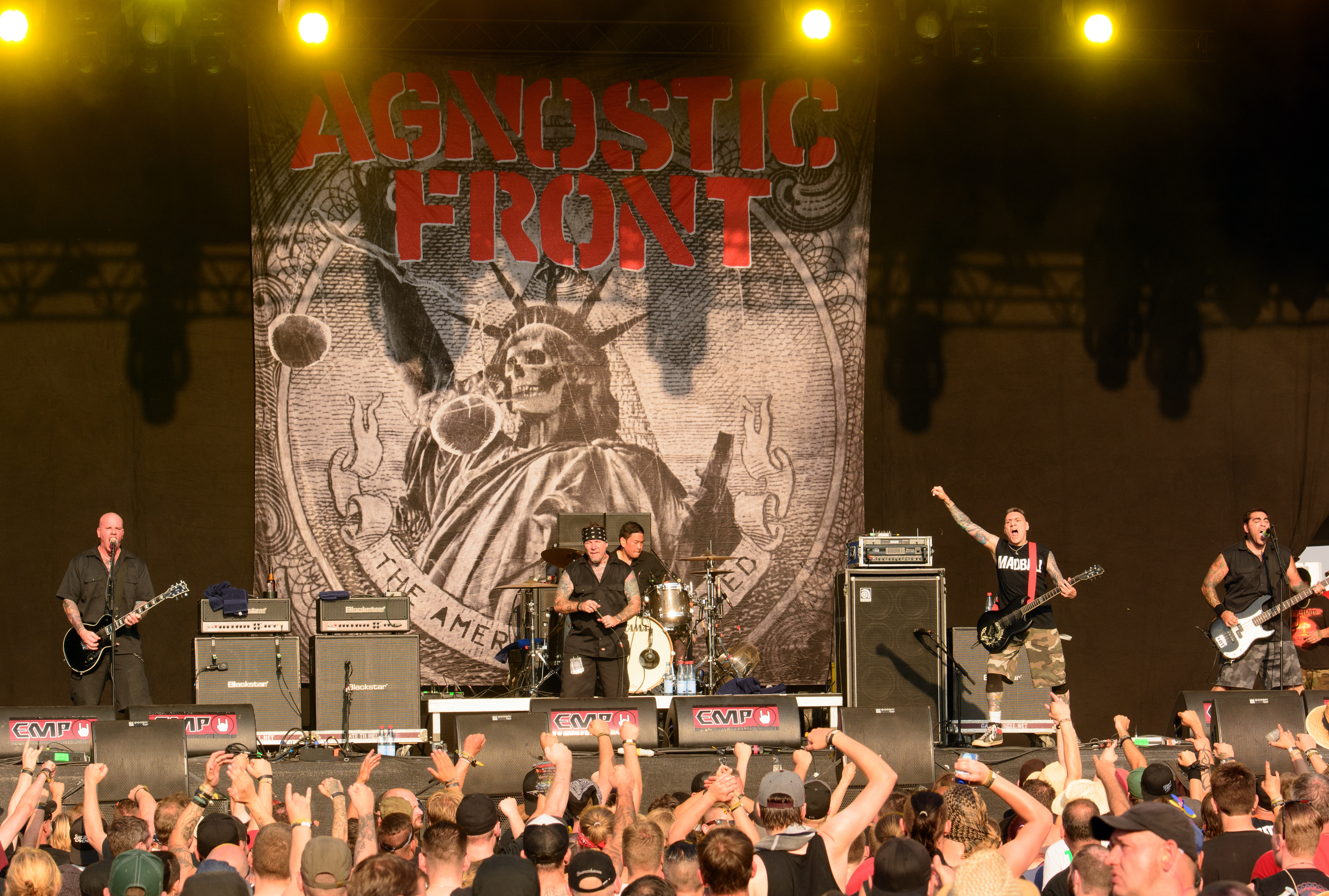
Agnostic Front at Reload Festival 2016

Agnostic Front is a hardcore band. Lead singer Roger Miret has claimed the band has always stayed true to its hardcore roots: "All those bands that everybody raves about—they gave up on you. They quit; they grew up out of [hardcore]. We never gave up on nobody." In a 2015 interview, Miret commented on the band's style and recording process, stating, "The music comes first ... and then I come in and see what the music is telling me." As for the evolution of their sound, he added, "It evolves organically, there's never a conscious thing, like 'we're gonna write this type of a song now.' ... We just write songs ... We revisit older sounds as part of what keeps it still clearly an Agnostic Front record."

Musically they are known to blend speedy, punk with thrash-metal and Oi! being one of the first groups to pioneer this type of music. They style is usually short, fast-paced pieces and largely avoid solo passages. Miret also claims the band gravitates towards a gritty sound because that's the way they sound during live performances. Stating “there's distortion in everything, I like my vocals to have a little something, but I don't like too many effects.” His vocal style is a combination of the deep vocals of British Oi! and the shouting typical of hardcore, which sounds very vicious, especially on the early albums. The only time he went away with this was on Cause for Alarm where he experimented with a higher, more metal-influenced voice.

Most of the band's lyrics which are mostly written by Roger Miret and Vinnie Stigma focus of unity, anti-war, anti-society, anti-establishment, political and social issues, along with criticizing government corruption.

In a 2023 interview with Blabbermouth.net Miret commented on tackling societal and political issues in their music stating:

The thing is, especially with Agnostic Front, we live that life too. We speak about oppression and overcoming oppression, and people can relate to that, whether they're oppressed by the government or at home or whatever. And then they see that we're genuine, we're real and they could relate to us. And that's why I think it's been a secret to our legacy is the fact that we are genuine and people can feel that and they feel that we come from a genuine place; they can relate to us.

Some of the band's influences include SS Decontrol, Minor Threat, Black Flag and Bad Brains, in an interview with Kerrang! Roger Miret cited additional influences as the Misfits and the Ramones along with other early punk bands. Vinnie Stigma has cited Jimi Hendrix as one of his biggest influences on his guitar playing. Mike Gallo has credited his bass style to Geezer Butler, Cliff Burton and Steve Harris.

== Legacy ==
Agnostic Front are viewed as the founder of the New York hardcore scene, and are commonly referred to as New York's first homegrown hardcore band. They helped define the New York hardcore sound back in 1983 with their debut Ep. As they set the tone for aggressive, working-class urban punk with attitude, introducing crossover thrash elements. Their influence has also reached beyond New York into the broader hardcore scene which has led to them being described as pioneers of crossover thrash genre along with earning the nickname "the godfathers of hardcore". Their first album Victim in Pain has been considered the first New York hardcore album, and was named in 2021 by Revolver magazine as one of ten essential New York hardcore albums. Their second album Cause For Alarm was inducted into the Decibel magazine Hall of Fame in 2014, and has been described as an "essential piece to the history of crossover music." AllMusic stated "The elemental sound of early Agnostic Front classics like 1984's Victim in Pain and 1986's Cause for Alarm were massively influential in the American hardcore scene, as well as providing a key stepping-stone toward speed and thrash metal.” Additionally they have been credited as an act that helped introduce metal fans to hardcore. In 2017, Loudwire ranked Agnostic Front one of the 10 greatest crossover thrash bands. Rolling Stone described them as the "forefathers to the Nineties "street punk" and Metal Hammer called them "the Iron Maiden of hardcore."

The band's two longest tenured members Vinnie Stigma and Roger Miret are often regarded as the two most influential members of the New York and overall hardcore scene. With Revolver Magazine stating that the two "carried the torch for punk's unapologetic cousin, hardcore, across the globe."

Agnostic Front has had a major influence on the New York Hardcore scene and beyond with bands such as Sick of It All, Madball, Pantera, Terror, Killswitch Engage, Rise Against, Gorilla Biscuits, Earth Crisis, Death Before Dishonor, Nails, Kill Your Idols, Life of Agony, Whitechapel, Hatebreed and Biohazard, all citing Agnostic Front as an influence.

== Documentary and other media ==
In 2017 a documentary about the band was released titled The Godfathers of Hardcore, which was produced by Ian McFarland. The documentary features the band's two longest tenured members Roger Miret and Vinnie Stigma, and goes over the band's early years, rise in fame and overall longevity. Besides music the film also dives into the pairs personal lives, struggles along with showing Miret and Stigma's “unbreakable” relationship throughout the years. There are additional interviews from members of Sick of It All, Murphy's Law, and Madball. The film received critical acclaim from multiple publications such as Rolling Stone, Forbes, Variety, The Hollywood Reporter and Metal Hammer. It also won an award for best documentary at the 2018 Boston Independent film festival.

Additionally both Miret and Stigma have released autobiographies which go over their time in the band.

In 2025 Miret released another book Agnostic Front - With Time, the comprehensive visual archives of Roger Miret, the book includes early and unseen photos and art from the band along with a tour diary which chroniclined their first US tour supporting their 1984 album Victim In Pain.

== Band members ==
Agnostic Front at Rockharz 2026

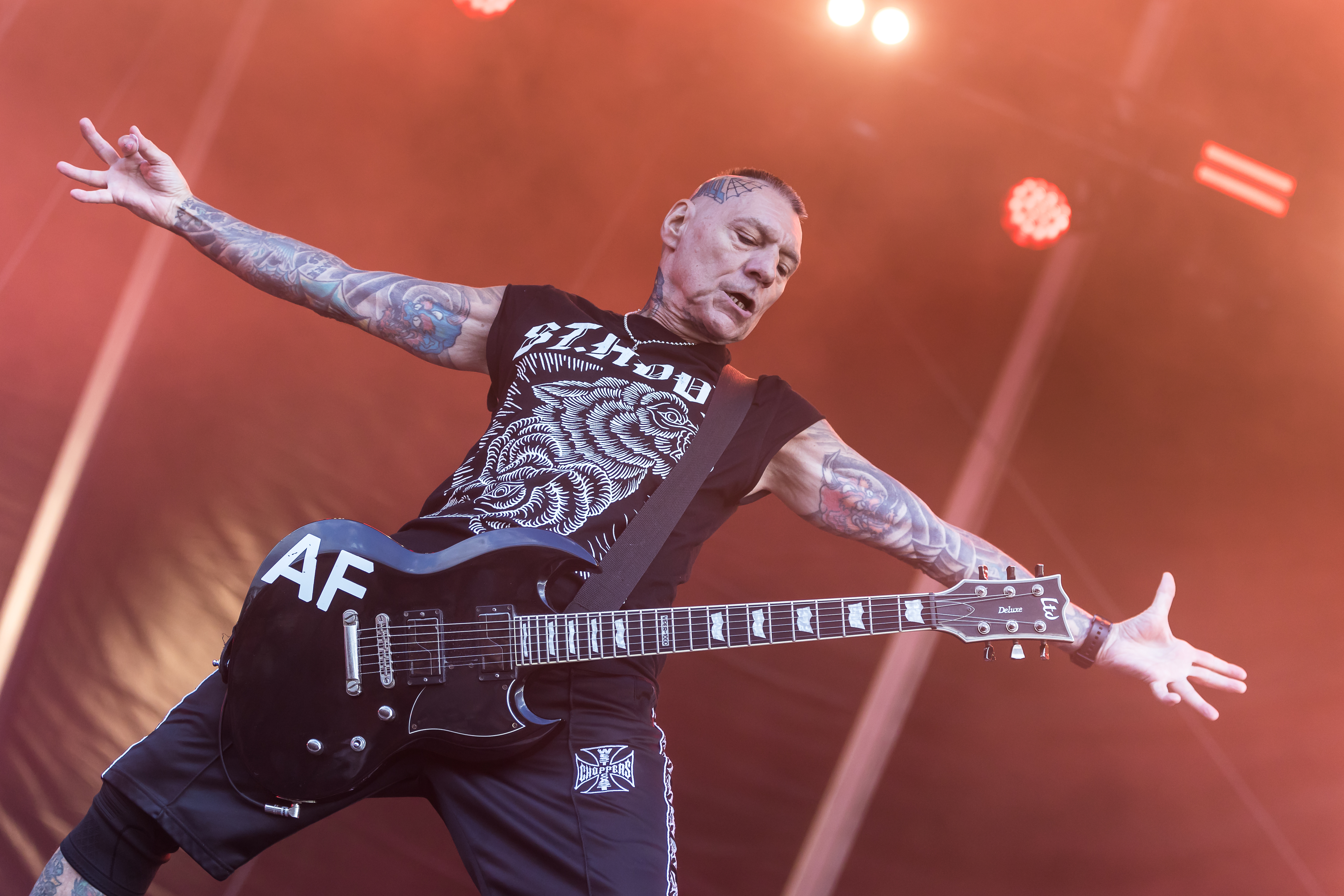
Lead guitarist Vinnie Stigma

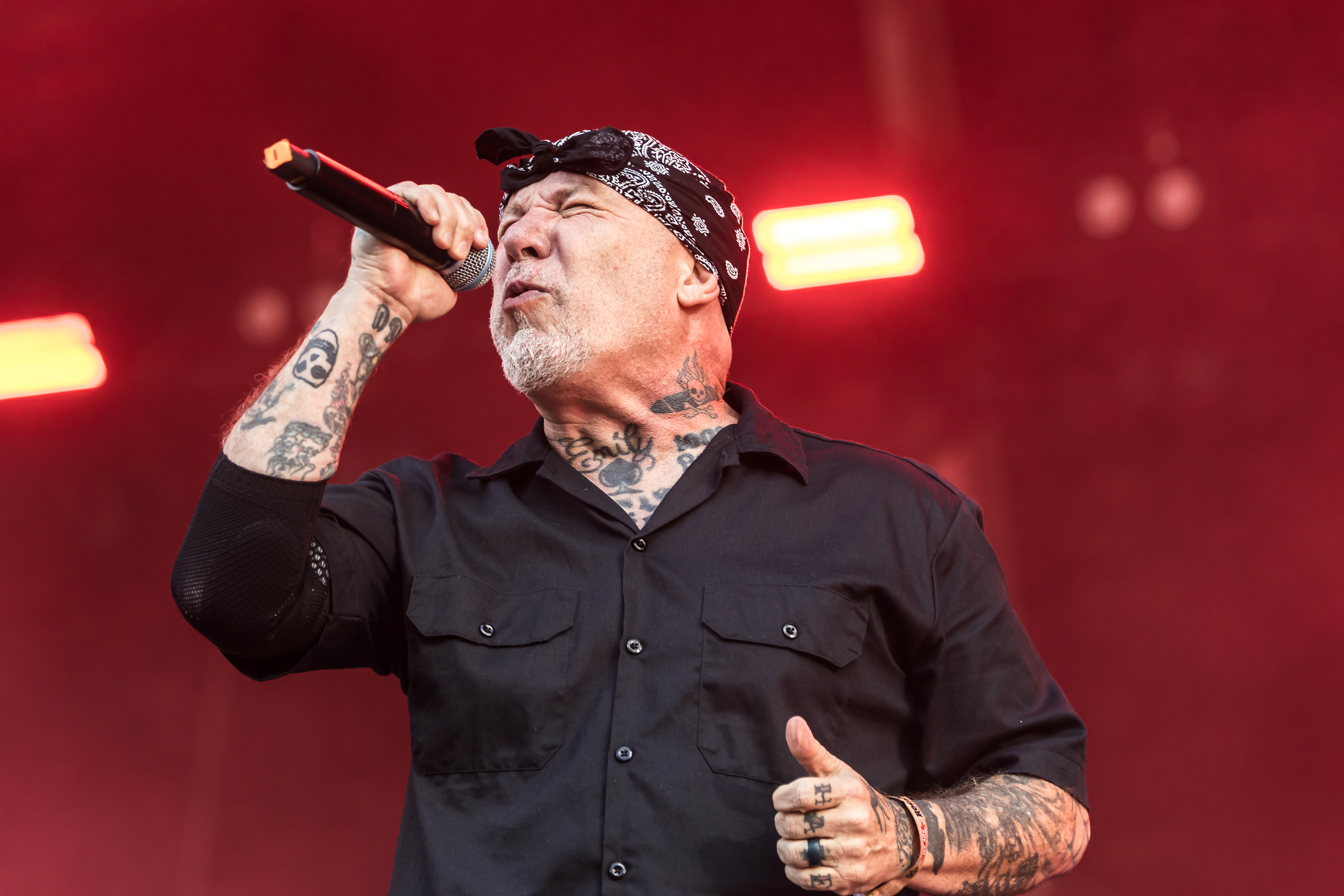
Lead vocalist Roger Miret

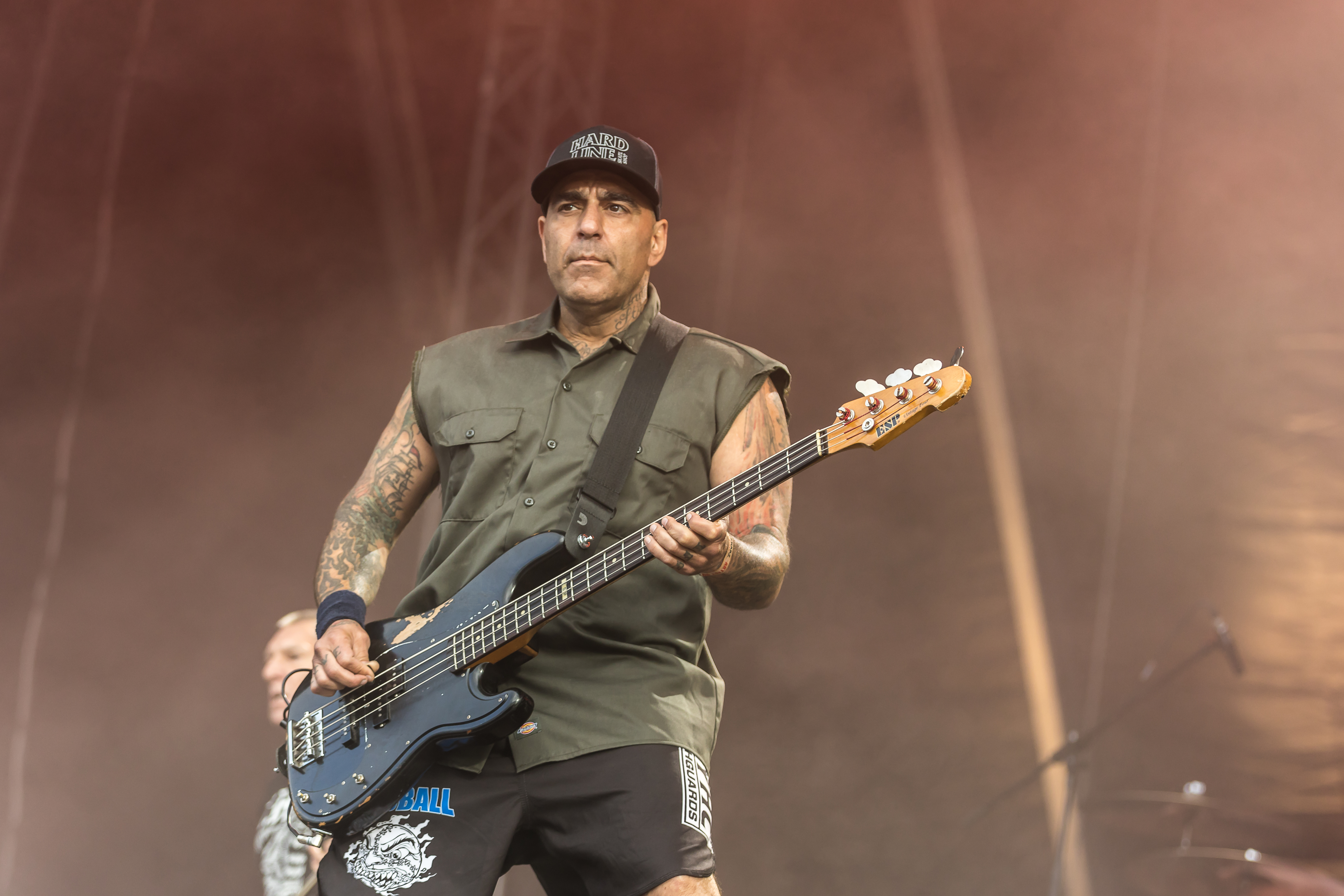
Bassist Mike Gallo

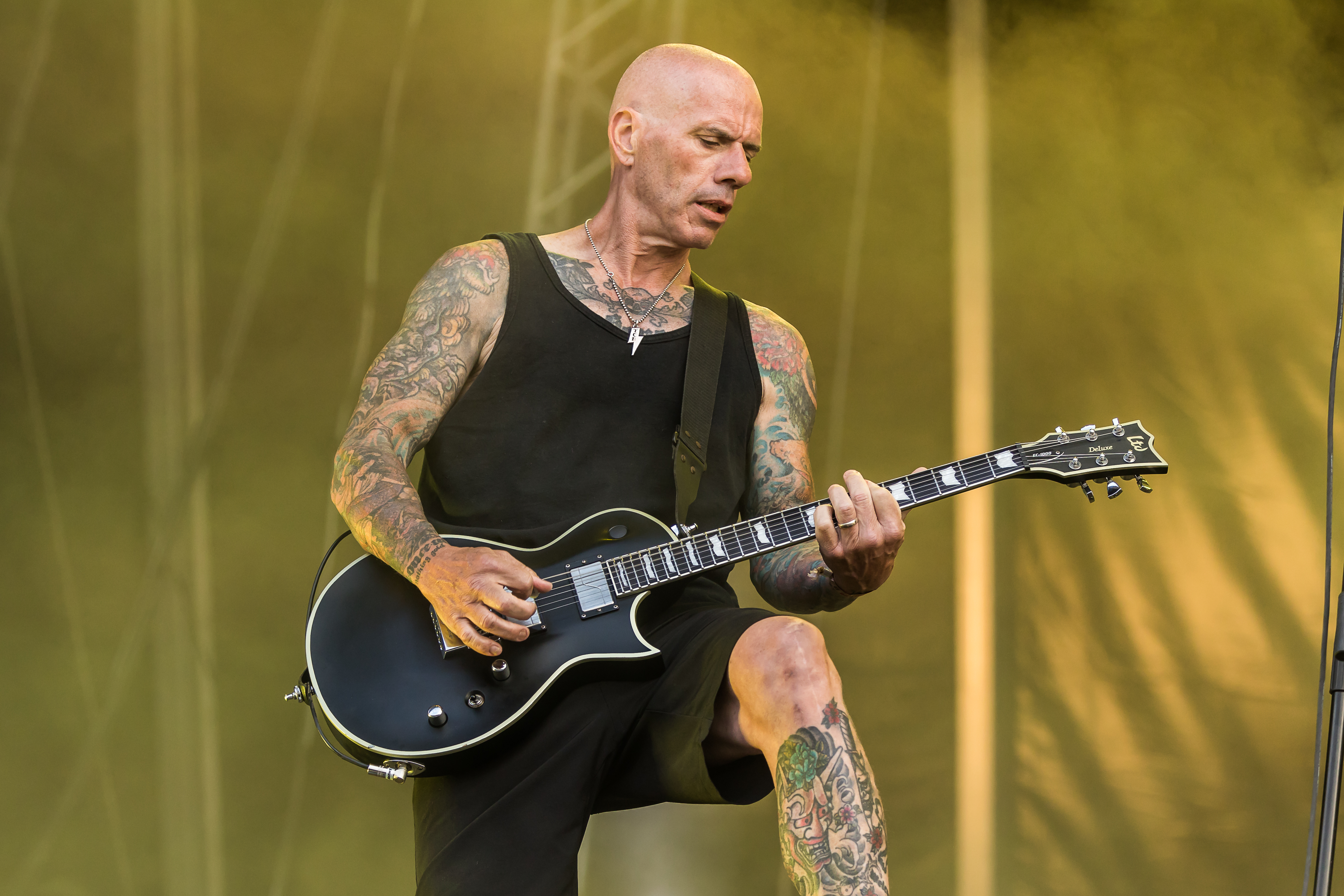
Rhythm guitarist Craig Silverman

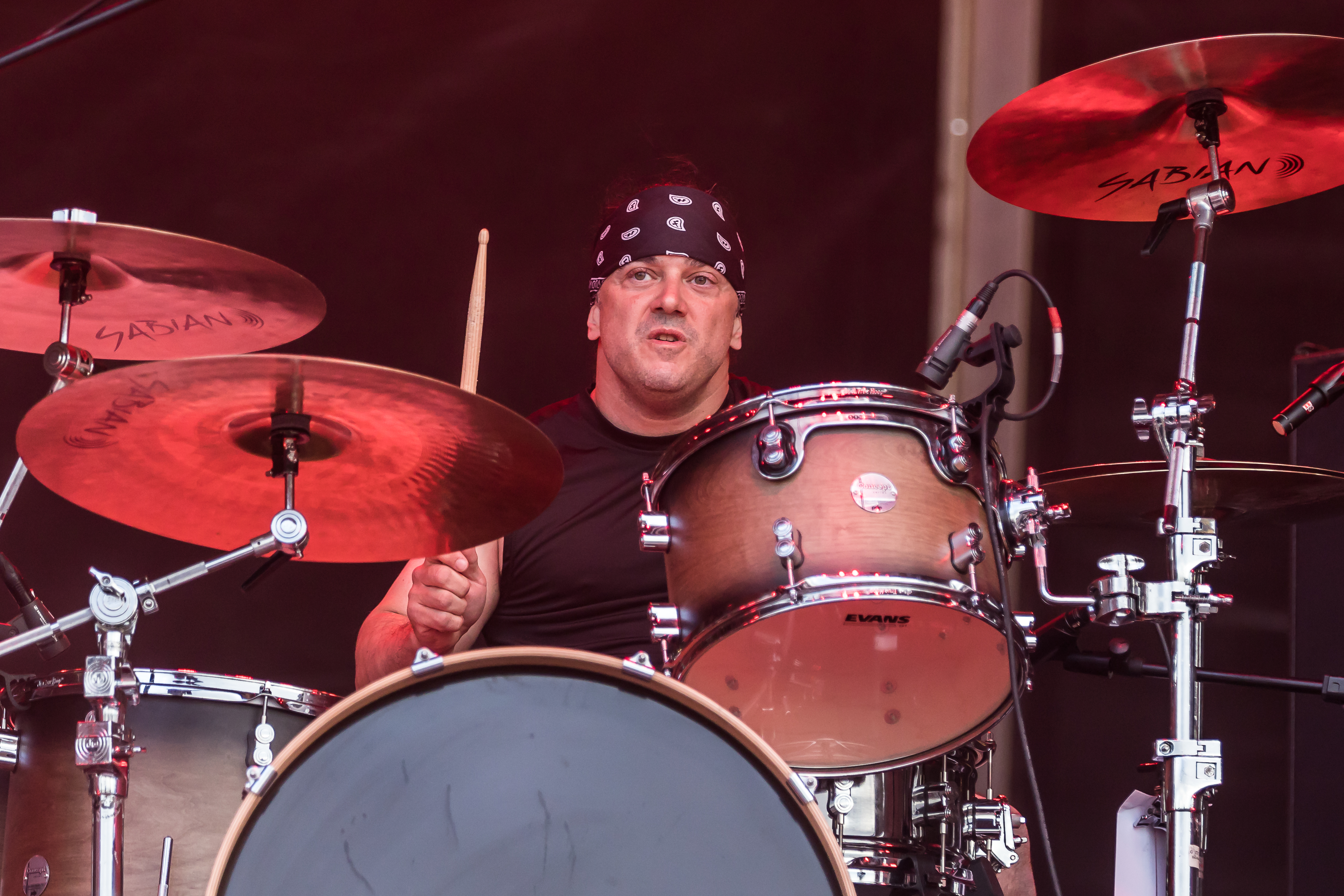
Drummer Danny Lamagna

Current members

- Vinnie Stigma – lead guitar, backing vocals (1982–1986, 1987–1993, 1996–present)
- Roger Miret – lead vocals (1983–1986, 1986, 1987–1993, 1996–present)
- Mike Gallo – bass, backing vocals (2000–present)
- Craig Silverman – rhythm guitar, backing vocals (2014–present)
- Danny Lamagna – drums (2022–present)

Former members

- See list of members for more info

== Discography ==
=== Studio albums ===
- Victim in Pain (1984) Rat Cage Records
- Cause for Alarm (1986) Relativity/Combat Records
- Liberty and Justice For... (1987) Relativity/Combat Records
- One Voice (1992) Relativity/Roadrunner Records
- Something's Gotta Give (1998) Epitaph Records
- Riot, Riot, Upstart (1999) Epitaph Records
- Dead Yuppies (2001) Epitaph Records
- Another Voice (2004) Nuclear Blast Records
- Warriors (2007) Nuclear Blast Records
- My Life My Way (2011) Nuclear Blast Records
- The American Dream Died (2015) Nuclear Blast Records
- Get Loud! (2019) Nuclear Blast Records
- Echoes in Eternity (2025) Reigning Phoenix Music

=== Live albums ===
- Live at CBGB (1989) Relativity Records
- Last Warning (1993) Relativity/Roadrunner Records
- Working Class Heroes (2002) I Scream Records split with Discipline
- Live at CBGB – 25 Years of Blood, Honor and Truth (2006) Nuclear Blast Records

=== Compilations ===
- To Be Continued: The Best of Agnostic Front (1992) Relativity
- Raw Unleashed (1995) Grand Theft Audio
- Respect Your Roots Worldwide (2012) Strength Records

=== EPs ===
- United Blood (1983) Last Warning Records
- Puro des Madre (en español) EP (1998) Hellcat Records
- Unity (1999) split with Dropkick Murphys
- For My Family EP (2007) Nuclear Blast Records
- That's Life 7" (2011) Bridge 9 Records

=== Music videos ===
- "Growing Concern" (1986)
- "Anthem" [Live] (1989)
- "Gotta Go" (1998)
- "Riot, Riot, Upstart" (1999)
- "So Pure to Me" (2004)
- "Peace" (2005)
- "All Is Not Forgotten" (2005)
- "All Is Not Forgotten" [Live] (2006)
- "Addiction" (2007)
- "For My Family" (2007)
- "Dead to Me" [Live] (2007)
- "That's Life" (2011)
- "A Mi Manera" (2011)
- "My Life My Way" (2011)
- "Us Against the World" (2012)
- "Blitzkrieg Bop" (2013)
- "Police Violence" (2015)
- "The American Dream Died" (2015)
- "A Wise Man" (2015)
- "Never Walk Alone" (2015)
- "Old New York" (2015)
- "Spray Painted Walls" (2019)
- "I Remember" (2019)
- "Conquer and Divide" (2019)
- "Urban Decay" (2020)
- "Way of War" (2025)
- "Matter of Life & Death" (2025)

=== DVD/VHS ===
- Live at CBGB 2006
- CBGB: Punk from the Bowery (Compilation)
- LIVE in N.Y.C. '91 (split with Sick of It All & Gorilla Biscuits)
