= The American Dream Died =

Studio album by Agnostic Front
- Released: April 4, 2015
- Genre: Hardcore punk
- Length: 27:51
- Label: Nuclear Blast
- Producer: Freddy Cricien

Agnostic Front chronology
My Life My Way (2011)	The American Dream Died (2015)	Get Loud! (2019)

The American Dream Died is the eleventh full-length album by New York hardcore band Agnostic Front. It was released on April 4, 2015, on Nuclear Blast. It was the first album to feature guitarist Craig Silverman.

== Background ==
The band started recording the album in late 2014, the bands lead singer Roger Miret stated in an interview “Myself and the band have never felt so confident and passionate about a release.” Adding “It’s full of anger, rage and honesty; all the makings of a classic. The session was really intense and the results show it all.” Like many of the band's previous records the albums lyrics are heavily political. In a separate interview Miret stated:

“It’s basically pretty much my opinion too of what the American Dream was and what it is today and we’re not talking about homes, cars and apple pie and shit like that, nothing materialistic. I’m talking about little by little chipping away at our constitutional rights and what does freedom mean anymore, who knows? It’s basically questioning those thoughts. You know, there’s a lot of values lost within the American culture.“

The band's guitarist Vinnie Stigma described the album as a throwback. Stating “It has a great pace to it. You got short, hardcore songs. You have a regular-length song. A melodic song.” The album was laid down on Stigma's birthday and was recorded in California.

== Critical reception ==
Professional ratings
Review scores
Source	Rating
AllMusic	3.5/5 stars
Blabbermouth.net	8.5/10
Metal Hammer	4/5 stars
Metal.de	9/10
The Music	4/5 stars
Ox-Fanzine	5/5 stars
Punknews.org	3.5/5 stars

Metal Hammer gave the record a 4/5 stating "The American Dream Died certainly writhes with frustration, its most exhilarating quality is its number of aggressively memorable anthems." Blabbermouth.net claimed "AGNOSTIC FRONT's acrimonious crusade may ring of the same themes they started out with, but that's sadly testament to the persistent issues they continue to protest. At least they still care. A great deal." Punknews.org wrote “While the lyrics are a little predictable, this is almost always likable. Agnostic Front will probably not win too many new converts, but they will definitely feed the faithful.” Ox-Fanzine gave the album a 5/5 stating "I am all the more delighted that they actually manage to constantly reinvent themselves, yet without yielding a single millimeter from what they originally helped to establish. A distinctive sound—combined with Roger’s unmistakable voice—ensures that one of the greatest punk bands of all time has delivered one of its finest albums." Mark of The Music added "Unfortunately, since then their efforts have sounded more than a little tired and derivative. The American Dream Died changes all that. Boasting the raw edge of the classic Victim In Pain LP and street-level bravado of the band’s Epitaph releases this album makes Agnostic Front relevant again."

== Track listing ==
No.	Title	Length
1.	"Intro"	2:01
2.	"The American Dream Died"	1:31
3.	"Police Violence"	0:58
4.	"Only in America"	1:39
5.	"Test of Time"	2:45
6.	"We Walk the Line"	1:49
7.	"Never Walk Alone"	2:52
8.	"Enough Is Enough"	0:40
9.	"I Can't Relate"	0:47
10.	"Old New York"	2:27
11.	"Social Justice"	2:25
12.	"Reasonable Doubt"	1:07
13.	"No War Fuck You"	0:37
14.	"Attack!"	1:11
15.	"A Wise Man"	2:26
16.	"Just Like Yesterday"	2:36
Total length:		28:09

== Personnel ==
Agnostic Front

- Roger Miret – vocals
- Vinnie Stigma – guitar
- Craig Silverman – guitar
- Mike Gallo – bass
- Pokey Mo – drums

Production

- Freddy Cricien – production
- Byron Filson – recording
- Paul Miner – recording, mastering, mixing
- Todd Huber – artwork, layout, photography

== Charts ==
Chart (2015)	Peak position
Switzerland (Hitparade)	135
