= Echoes in Eternity =

Studio album by Agnostic Front
- Released: November 7, 2025
- Studios: Mei; Villain
- Genre: Hardcore punk
- Length: 26:22
- Label: Reigning Phoenix
- Producer: Mike Dijan

Agnostic Front chronology
Get Loud! (2019)	Echoes in Eternity (2025)

Echoes in Eternity is the 13th studio album by American hardcore band Agnostic Front, released on November 7, 2025 via Reigning Phoenix Music. It is the band's first album with drummer Danny Lamagna.

== Overview ==
Echoes in Eternity is the band's first album release in six years, due in part to lead singer Roger Miret's cancer diagnosis in 2021. In an interview, Miret commented on the album, stating: "We have always taken risks, never followed the pack and are really proud of how the album turned out. The songs feel fresh, and the lyrics are current and personal. It's an attestment to our longevity, dedication, and leading the forefront in our genre. What we do in life now 'Echoes in Eternity' and it shows."

The first single, "Way of War", was released on September 23, 2025. Following the song's release, Miret commented: "The track is very much a sign of the times! How the corrupt politicians greed pulls us and many other nations into senseless wars." The second single, "Matter of Life & Death", was released on October 14 and features a collaboration with Darryl McDaniels of Run-DMC. The song was accompanied with a music video in which McDaniels was also featured.

The full album, their debut on Reigning Phoenix Music, was released on November 7. Four days later, the group debuted the music video for the song "Sunday Matinee". Miret stated the song is a celebration of "the gathering of friends, families and the joyous times when we all looked forward to our Sunday Matinee, particularly during the classic CBGB era."

The band announced an East Coast tour beginning in December 2025 alongside Raw Brigade and Violent. In February 2026, they will go on a European tour in support of the album.

On July 23, 2026, an additional music video was released for the song "Divided."

== Writing and lyrics ==
In an interview with Blabbermouth lead singer Roger Miret spoke on the albums lyrical themes:

Well, lyrically wise, I do speak about sociopolitical stuff, which is stuff that goes around me on a day-to-day basis. I speak about overcoming oppression. So during the making of this album, we all experienced that — between [2019's] 'Get Loud!' and this album, we all experienced what you call the pandemic, and everybody lost two years of their life. Those two years of your life, you could just erase 'em. You didn't do anything. You just sat around and got on your computer and you couldn't go anywhere, you couldn't do nothing, you couldn't travel. So that's two years waste of life. I mean, during those two years I was writing little things, of course, and then I got hit with cancer, and I was writing little things, of course.

== Critical reception ==
Professional ratings
Review scores
Source	Rating
Blabbermouth.net	8/10
Distorted Sound	8/10
Ghost Cult Magazine	9/10
Metal Bite	9/10
The Razor Edge	Positive
Source Webzine	8/10

Echoes in Eternity has received positive reviews since its release. Don Lawson of Blabbermouth.net gave the album a 8/10, stating "Echoes in Eternity is as definitive a hardcore experience as anyone is likely to get in 2025. Sometimes, it takes the masters to raise the alarm, and here it is, ringing with deafening assurance." Garry Alcock, writing for Ghost Clut Magazine, gave the album a 9/10 rating, stating "Another overwhelming success, Echoes in Eternity is yet another example why Agnostic Front has been, will continue to be, and will always remain, at the top of the hardcore heap." Dan Barnes of The Razor Edge added "Echoes in Eternity is Agnostic Front's Reigning Phoenix Music's debut and is a reminder that the fire still burns brightly and passionately." Ed Walton of Distorted Sound gave the album a 8/10, calling it "the true tour de force of an album which wears its heart on its sleeve with pride. Echoes in Eternity holds the spirit of hardcore and creates a fun, no holds barred listen that shakes you to your core but is an abundance of fun throughout, it is not to be missed."

== Track listing ==
All tracks are written by Agnostic Front.

Echoes in Eternity track listing
No.	Title	Length
1.	"Way of War"	1:49
2.	"You Say"	1:36
3.	"Matter of Life & Death"	3:04
4.	"Tears for Everyone"	1:52
5.	"Divided"	1:53
6.	"Sunday Matinee"	2:57
7.	"I Can't Win"	1:22
8.	"Art of Silence"	0:42
9.	"Shots Fired"	2:06
10.	"Hell to Pay"	2:06
11.	"Evolution of Madness"	1:07
12.	"Skip the Trial"	2:19
13.	"Obey"	1:46
14.	"Eyes Open Wide"	1:43
Total length:		26:22

== Personnel ==
Credits adapted from the album's liner notes and Tidal.

=== Agnostic Front ===
- Mike Gallo – bass
- Danny Lamagna – drums
- Roger Miret – vocals
- Craig Silverman – guitar
- Vinnie Stigma – guitar

=== Additional contributors ===
- Mike Dijan – production
- Zeuss – mixing, mastering
- Anthony Paganini – tracking
- Byron Filson – vocal tracking
- Ernie Parada – cover and label art
- Todd Huber – layout
- An Maes – live photos
- Darryl McDaniels – vocals on "Matter of Life & Death"
- John Scanlon – backup vocals
- Andrew Vacante – backup vocals
- Sebastian Paba – backup vocals
- Devon Dijan – backup vocals
- Dylan Dijan – backup vocals
- Nick Valero – backup vocals

== Charts ==
Chart (2025)	Peak position
German Albums (Offizielle Top 100)	33
German Rock & Metal Albums (Offizielle Top 100)	11
Swiss Albums (Schweizer Hitparade)	100
US Independent Albums (Billboard)	39
US Top Rock Albums (Billboard)	38
US Top Hard Rock Albums (Billboard)	10
US Alternative Albums (Billboard)	31
