= Outbreak (band) =

American hardcore punk band

- Origin: Maine, U.S.
- Genres: Hardcore punk
- Years active: 2002–2011
- Labels: Bridge 9; Think Fast!; Trustkill
- Members: Ryan o'Connor (vocals); Erik Perkins (drums); Brian Kemsley (guitar); Billy Bean (guitar)
- Past members: Thom Garwood; Chuck Bruce; Austin Lemieux; Joe Lacey; Chris Linkovich; Nate Manning; Seger Dailey; Chris Legg; Mikey Merante; Tim O'Connor
- Website: facebook.com/outbreak

Outbreak is an American hardcore punk band from Maine. The group was founded in 2002 and has released two full-length albums, Failure on Bridge 9 and Outbreak on Think Fast! Records. The band has released several other EP's, splits, and singles, notably appearing on the Saw VI: Original Motion Picture Soundtrack in 2009, along with Hatebreed, Type O Negative, Suicide Silence, Every Time I Die, and others.

== History ==
Outbreak formed in western Maine in 2002 where vocalist Ryan O'Connor, and guitarist Chuck Bruce attended high school together. They would later recruit Austin Lemieux on bass guitar although the lineup would change several times over the years to follow. Practice sessions were originally held in an abandoned warehouse in Kingfield, Maine. The group started out playing locally, and quickly generated a buzz within the hardcore punk scene, which ultimately led to their signing to Bridge 9 Records. The band released Failure in 2006, their first full-length, which generally received positive press. The band supported the effort with global touring including stops in Australia, Japan, Europe, and South America. After a major lineup change in 2008 which saw most of the active lineup continuing to perform with their side project, Cruel Hand Outbreak would release their second full-length album on O'Connor's own, Think Fast! Records, with a distribution deal through Universal Music Group/Trustkill. The album was released on November 10, 2009, and generally received positive press, including write ups from Alternative Press and Outburn. Alternative Press called the album "tighter, smarter, and livelier" while Outburn called it "thought provoking and exciting". Outbreak would debut a song from the album via the Saw VI: Original Motion Picture Soundtrack in October 2009.

Outbreak has supported acts such as Cro-Mags, Misery Signals, Comeback Kid, Bane, Sick of It All, and Agnostic Front. They have played national and international festivals including Bamboozle and Groezrock. O'Connor cites hardcore punk pioneers such as Black Flag and Bad Brains as influences as well as contemporary punk bands such as Rise Against.

Though no official statements have been made the band has remained inactive for the majority of 2011 and since that time.

== Discography ==
Studio albums

- 2009: Outbreak (Think Fast!, Trustkill)
- 2006: Failure (Bridge 9, Think Fast!)

EPs

- 2009: Work to Death (Think Fast!)
- 2007: Split with Only Crime (Think Fast!)
- 2005: Eaten Alive Reissue (Think Fast!)
- 2004: You Make Us Sick (Bridge 9)
- 2003: Eaten Alive (Western Front)

Compilation appearances

- 2009: Saw VI: Original Motion Picture Soundtrack (Trustkill)
  - Contributed song "The Countdown Begins"
