= Sean Taggart =

Sean Taggart is an American illustrator and artist. He began his career in the early 1980s doing flyers and album covers for bands in the New York Hardcore scene, such as Agnostic Front, Murphy's Law, and the Cro-Mags, and was the artist of the iconic Crumbsuckers first album cover. He has also done art for the bands Carnivore, Prong, and Napalm Death, among many others.

In the 1990s, Taggart was the character designer and illustrator for the Jerky Boys, and drew the poster art for the Jerky Boys film. His drawing of the Frank Rizzo character was featured in the "Bud Light, I said!" advertising campaign for Budweiser.

Taggart's fine art paintings have been exhibited in both group and one-man shows at Brooklyn's McCaig-Welles Gallery and at Exit Art in New York City.

Interviews with Taggart have appeared in many fan magazines, as well as in the book American Hardcore: A Tribal History, by Steven Blush. Taggart also appears in the 2006 Sony Pictures documentary film American Hardcore, although his name is misspelled (Taggert) onscreen.

Taggart has been married to American comic book writer, editor, and DJ Bronwyn Carlton since 1991.
