= Think Fast! Records =

- Distributor: Trustkill Records
- Genre: Hardcore punk
- Country of origin: U.S.
- Official website: thinkfastrecords.com

Think Fast! Records is an American independent hardcore punk record label. The label has hosted a number of influential acts, and is notable for being involved in the Trustkill Records imbroglio, having appointed Trustkill Records as worldwide distributor.

== Notable bands ==
- Bullet Treatment
- Earth Crisis
- The Geeks
- Have Heart
- Ignite
- Only Crime
- Only Living Witness
- Outbreak
- Police Beat
- Re:Ignition
- Sick of It All
- This Is Hell
- Turning Point
- Until the End
- Where Fear and Weapons Meet
- Youth Attack
