= The Psychos =

New York hardcore band

The Psychos were an American first-generation New York hardcore band. They were Roger Miret's previous band before joining Agnostic Front as a vocalist in 1982. In The Psychos, Miret played bass while the vocalist was Steve Rieber (later of Swine Dive). After Miret's departure, he was replaced by Billy Milano, later of Stormtroopers of Death and M.O.D.
