= Infiltrate the System =

Infiltrate The System

Studio album by Madball
- Released: August 21, 2007
- Recorded: May, 2007
- Studio: Planet Z Recording Studios
- Genre: Hardcore punk
- Length: 32:53
- Label: Ferret Music
- Producer: Zeuss

Madball chronology
Legacy (2005)	Infiltrate The System (2007)	Empire (2010)

Infiltrate the System is the sixth studio album by New York City hardcore punk band Madball. The album was produced by Zeuss and was released on August 21, 2007.

== Background and recording ==
Madball began rehearsing for the album in December 2006. In a press release the band stated "We've already got some basic ideas down, and this promises to be our hardest record to date". Lead singer Freddy Cricien stated the band originally started writing for two months, with Jorge "Hoya Roc" Guerra Hoya writing most of the riffs with help from Brian "Mitts" Daniels. Just like their previous album legacy Madball would formulate songs and get them as finished as possible before officially going into the studio. The group recorded the album at Planet Z Recording Studios in Massachusetts with producer Zeuss. By June 2007 the band had officially finished the recording process.

In an interview with The Aquarian Cricien commented on the albums title stating:

It was kind of like something we’ve been throwing around lately ’cause I keep bumping into people that are like, somewhere along the way they were Madball fans, or fans of hardcore. So I started saying our people are infiltrating the system. It was kind of like a thing that I started saying to the guys at Ferret, and it seemed appropriate when we started writing the stuff for the record. I don’t want to say this is a concept album, but it’s like half and half. If you break down half of the album, half the songs are about infiltrating the system, but it’s not all about the same thing, everything from political shit to the music industry, to the school system, so half of the record talks about that pretty much and then a good portion of it [is] random subjects, things that we wanted to address.

The album was released in North America through Ferret Music, Internationally the album was released through I Scream Records in Europe, Liberation in South America and Resist in Australia. A part of the albums sales were donated to the Arpoador Children's Fund. A music video was produced for the title track featuring the band and fans.

== Critical reception ==
Professional ratings
Review scores
Source	Rating
AllMusic	3/5 stars
PopMatters	5/10
PunkNews	3.5/5 stars
Blabbermouth.net	6.5/10
Ox-Fanzine	Positive

Infiltrate The System is seen as one of Madballs more politically charged albums. Ox-Fanzine wrote "MADBALL delivers their message with their customary high standard of quality, packaged within hard-hitting, mid-tempo tracks—songs that critics will likely be all too eager to dismiss as stagnation. However, for all those who love the quintessential MADBALL sound, the full broadside of NYHC will once again come crashing down upon them". Eduardo Rivadavia of AllMusic added "Madball still represent classic hardcore at its best, with a set of 13 new songs as memorable as they are timeless. What's more, confrontational tracks like "We the People," "Revolt," "Takeover," and "Stand Up NY" sound and feel absolutely effortless in their execution, making it pretty much impossible (or at least pointless) to separate them from Madball's past triumphs." Blabbermouth.net gave the album a more neutral review stating "MADBALL continue to sound more convincing than most. "Infiltrate the System" should satisfy long-time fans, but it will not go down as a classic either".

== Track listing ==
No.	Title	Length
1.	"We The People"	2:31
2.	"Infiltrate The System"	3:04
3.	"Revolt"	3:35
4.	"No Escape"	2:27
5.	"Takeover"	2:51
6.	"Renegades"	3:04
7.	"Set Me Free"	3:25
8.	"The Messenger"	2:03
9.	"Liberty Or Death"	2:40
10.	"A Novelty"	2:18
11.	"Your Gone"	2:11
12.	"P.Y.I.T.F. Part 3"	0:20
13.	"Stand Up NY"	2:48

== Personnel ==
All Credits adapted from Tidal

Madball

- Freddy Cricien — vocals
- Jorge "Hoya Roc" Guerra — bass
- Brian "Mitts" Daniels — guitar
- Rigg Ross — drums

Additional musicians

- Hans Schmidt — backing vocals
- Jah Chemistry — backing vocals
- Pathella "Blackjack" Cornelius — backing vocals

Production

- Zeuss — Producer, recording, engineer, mixing
- Alan Douches — mastering
- Don Mandell — portraits
