= Freddy Cricien =

American vocalist (born 1975)

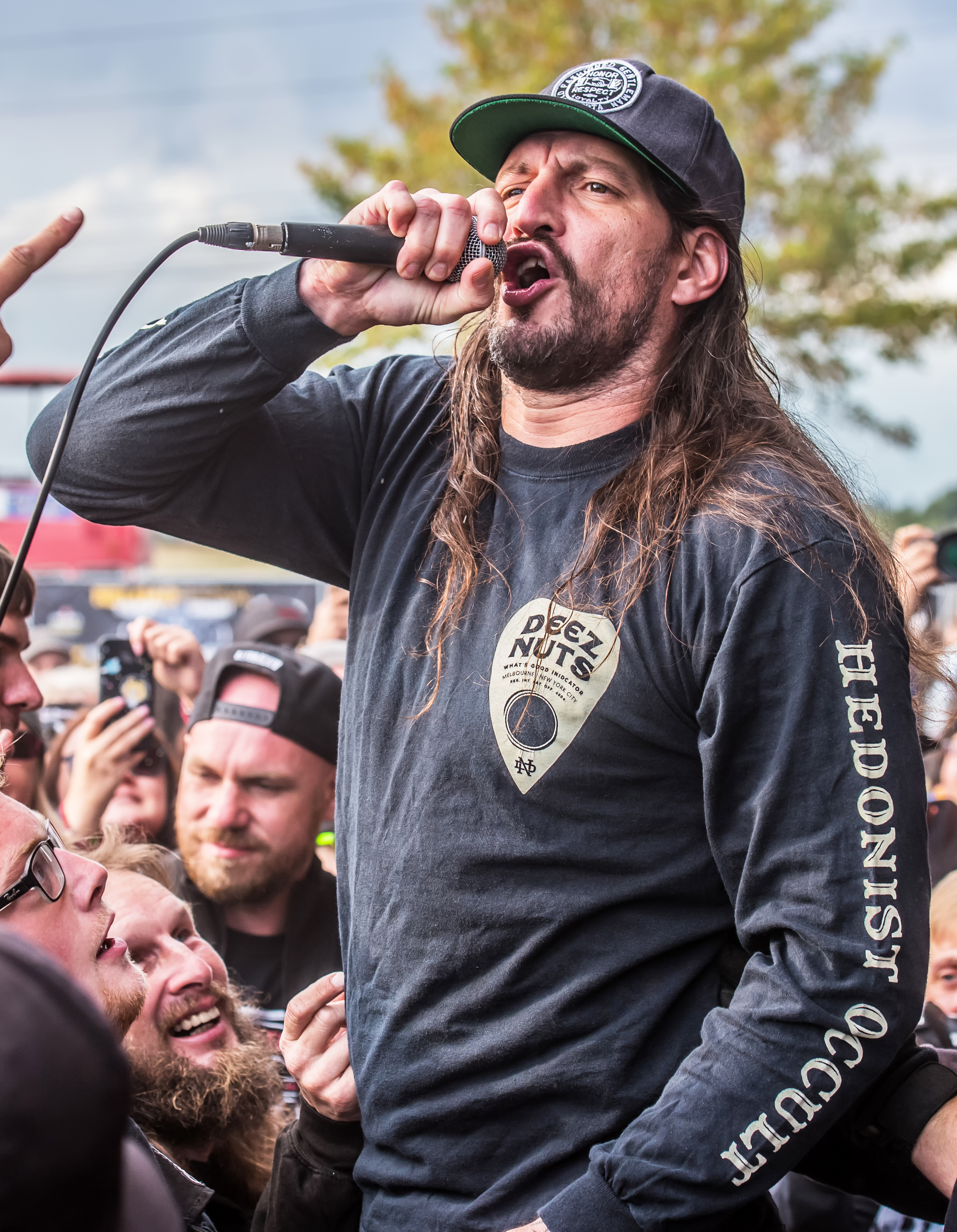
- Cricien performing with Madball in 2018

Background information
- Also known as: Freddy Madball
- Born: November 4, 1975 (age 50); Passaic, New Jersey, U.S.
- Origin: New York City, U.S.
- Genres: New York hardcore, hardcore punk, hip-hop
- Occupations: Singer, songwriter, producer
- Years active: 1989–present
- Member of: Madball, Hazen Street

Freddy Cricien (born November 4, 1975), also known as Freddy Madball, is an American vocalist, producer and songwriter, primarily known as the lead singer of the New York hardcore band Madball. He is also the lead singer of Hazen Street and has a hip-hop career from which debut album was November 2009's Catholic Guilt. He also moonlights as an MC with DJ Stress as the hip-hop duo Freddy Madball & DJ Stress.

== Early life ==
Cricien was born in Passaic, New Jersey on November 4, 1975. His mother is from Havana, Cuba and his father is from Barranquilla, Colombia. He has three older siblings from the same mother. The eldest is Roger Miret of Agnostic Front. At five years old, Freddy and his family relocated to Miramar, Florida. Roger stayed behind and soon after became immersed in the New York hardcore music scene. Growing up his parents mainly played Latin music, however he was quickly exposed to a wide variety of genres by his older brother and sister. Growing up Cricien was a fan of hip-hop culture, he and his friends would street dance and graffiti.

== Career ==
=== Madball ===
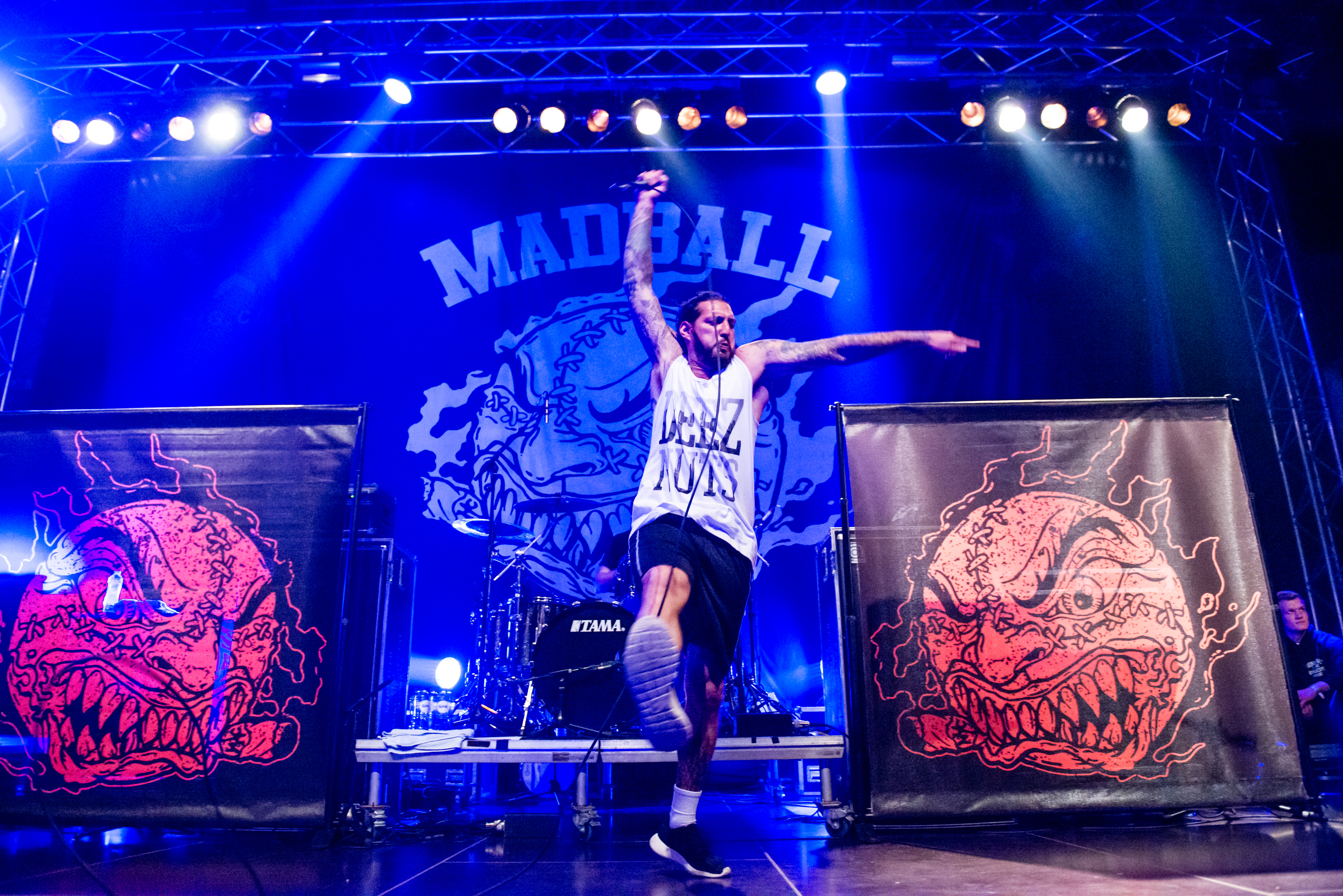
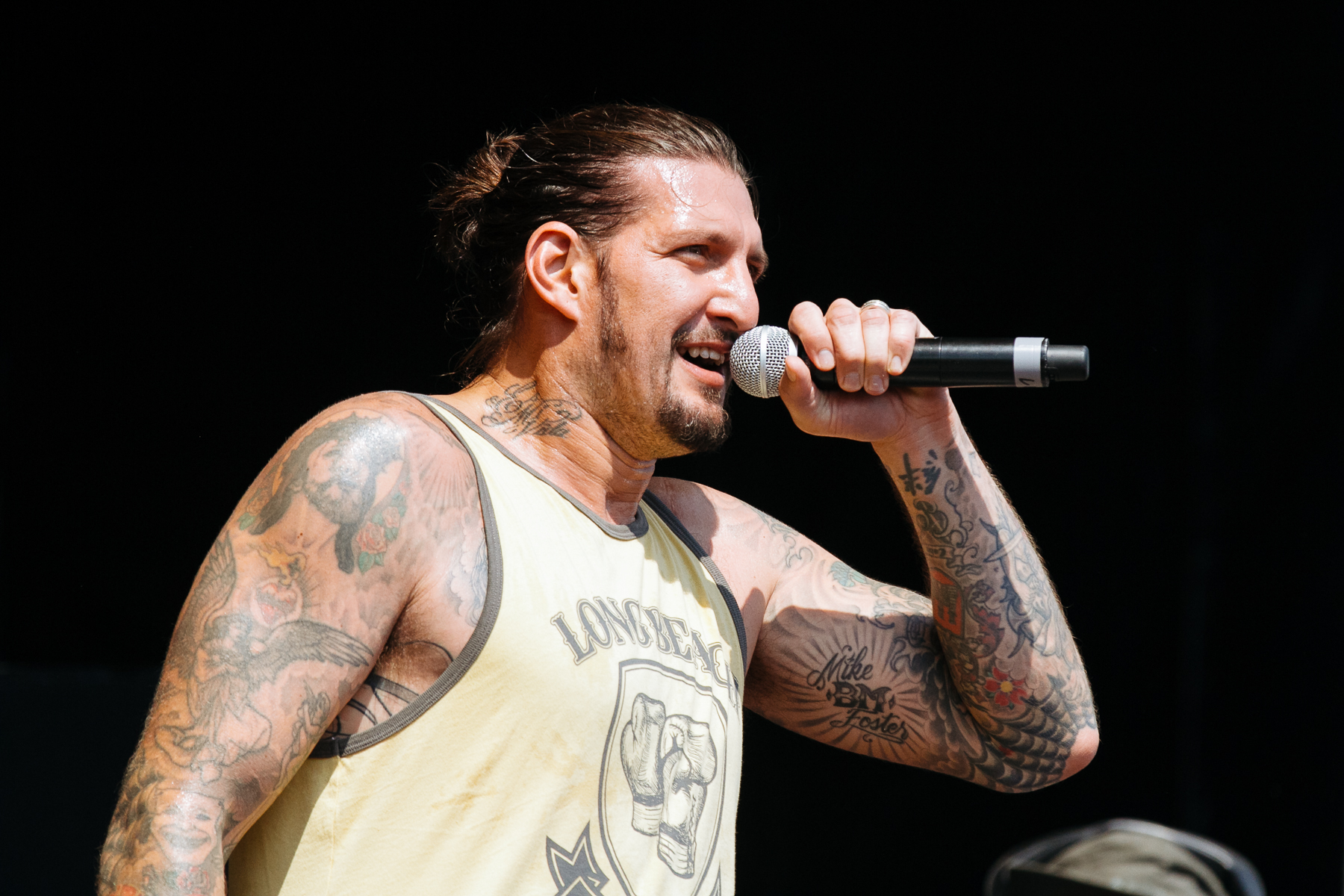
Cricien performing with Madball in 2015

Cricien has been involved in the hardcore scene for almost his entire life, it all started when he was about seven years old, when he visited with his brother in New York City and he began to perform on stage with Agnostic Front, singing a few songs which would become a staple of their shows during this period. Shortly after, he began to join the band on tour. During this time he became the group's unofficial mascot and was given the name “Agnostic Fred”. The group would have to sneak Cricien into a drum case to smuggle him into early shows during the 1980s. In his brother Roger Miret's 2017 memoir he wrote “Freddy loved the hardcore scene from the start,” “and took to it like a pyromaniac to a blowtorch.” The members of Agnostic Front then decided to start a group Madball with Cricien as the vocalist so in 1988 Madball was formed featuring most of Agnostic Front's members. Madball's name comes from a nickname Cricien was given by Vinnie Stigma when he was around 11–12. Madball consisted of Miret on bass, Vinnie Stigma on guitar, Will Shepler on drums, and then 12-year-old Cricien, as the vocalist. The group originally played unused Agnostic Front songs which they released on their debut 1989 EP Ball of Destruction.

When Cricien was 16 years old, he moved permanently to New York City and moved in with Miret. In 1992, Madball recorded and released the Droppin Many Suckas EP. This recording featured original music and the addition of Matt Henderson on guitar. In 1994 Madball released their debut album Set It Off which has been described as an influential album in the hardcore genre. In the years to follow, Madball continued to release new albums (Demonstrating My Style-1996, Look My Way-1998, Been There, Done That-1998, and Hold It Down-2000). In 2000, Cricien was charged with attempted criminal possession of a weapon and was sentenced to six months in prison. The following year in 2001 the band announced their dissolution and went on a farewell European tour. However Cricien and the band ultimately decided to reform in late 2002 with a new line-up featuring Brian "Mitts" Daniels and Rigg Ross.

Cricien later reflected on the bands brief dissolution stating:

We thought we were done, like Madball was gonna be done at this point and it was never gonna happen again. And sure enough, it did. I think that also helped our longevity, because we cleared our heads of a lot of things [and] kind of came out swinging a little bit harder on the second round. I think that might have helped us, actually. After that period, I decided to sort of take control of the band business-wise and so on. Before that, I didn't really care about that part of it. I was just like, "Yeah, all right, let's go play, let's have fun, whatever." This was an outlet for us; it was therapeutic for us. Like, "Let's just go do whatever we do. We make a couple bucks? Cool. If we don't? Well, we traveled around, we got to see some cool stuff."

They began touring and recording at the end of 2002 and have since released another 7 albums (N.Y.H.C-2004, Legacy-2005, Infiltrate the System-2007, Empire-2010, Rebellion EP-2012, Hardcore Lives-2014, and most recently For the Cause-2018). He has been through multiple global tours and over three decades of activity and has kept the band going throughout multiple lineup changes.

Cricien and Madball also run their own yearly Rebellion tour, which is a yearly European tour featuring hardcore bands.

=== Other projects and collaborations ===
In 1992 Cricien's brother Roger Miret underwent surgery to treat an inguinal hernia. This led to Cricien temporarily stepping in as the lead singer of Agonistic Front for a string of shows in July of that year.

In 2004 Cricien helped form the supergroup Hazen Street alongside fellow Madball member Hoya Roc, Toby Morse (H_{2}O), David Kennedy (Box Car Racer, Over My Dead Body, later Angels & Airwaves), and Mackie (Cro-Mags & Bad Brains). Chad Gilbert (Shai Hulud and later New Found Glory) co-wrote and helped record every song on their debut and only self titled album. The group soon broke up in 2006 but has played a couple of one-off shows in 2009, 2011, 2012 and in 2023 together with Madball and H2O, they took part in the Rebellion Tour 2023, playing shows all over Europe.

In 2009 Cricien started a hip-hop group alongside DJ Stress, known as Freddy Madball & DJ Stress, culminating in the 2009 debut album Catholic Guilt. The record infused hardcore's raw energy and streetwise themes into rap verses, addressing personal and cultural struggles.

Cricien has made guest appearances on tracks by bands such as Fear Factory (vocals on the bonus track Agnostic Front song "Your Mistake"), Deviate (vocals on "Last Judgement"), Sick of It All (vocals on "Forked Tongue" on the Death to Tyrants album), H_{2}O (guest vocals on the song "Guilty By Association" on the F.T.T.W. album), 25 ta Life (guest vocals on "Loyal to da Grave" on the Strength Through Unity album), Shutdown (guest vocals on "Few and Far Between" on the album of the same name), Skarhead (guest vocals on "I Won't Change" on the album Kings at Crime). He also appeared on Agnostic Fronts The American Dream Died. More recently, in 2023, he collaborated with rising NYHC band Pain of Truth on their single "You and Me," In 2025, Cricien appeared on Necro's track "You Already Know," alongside Danny Diablo of Crown of Thornz.

He also co founded Black N' Blue Productions which was a New York-based company behind live events, like the "Superbowl of Hardcore" shows.

Cricien has also worked as a record producer, mostly working with his brother's band Agnostic Front. With his first work coming on their 2007 album Warriors. He also produced Wisdom In Chains 2012 album The Missing Links, along with Madballs two most recent albums.

== Style and influences ==
Cricien vocal technique is characterized by an aggressive shouted delivery. He never had any singing lessons and claimed that he learned the hard way stating in an interview:

Just yell as loud and as hard as you can, kid, and see what happens!" It was very barbaric type of shit. Then add puberty into the mix! Over the years I pretty much taught myself to balance out the tone and grit in my voice, and how to project it. But it took a few records, at least. I probably ruined my vocal cords way before I got it figured out. On the road it held up for the most part, miraculously.

His lyrical themes center on unity, perseverance, and personal struggle. Madball's Songs frequently advocate for collective strength and living by one's word. Cricien views music as an outlet and has described writing and performing life as therapeutic and life-saving for him. He has claimed Madball helped him avoid “negative elements” from the streets and heavy personal struggles. Many of his influences come from the early sound of 1980s New York Hardcore which he became a part of, like his brother Roger Miret. Besides hardcore, Cricien has a broad music taste and has taken influences from hip-hop acts like Public Enemy, Beastie Boys and LL Cool J.

Cricien is known to have a very active stage presence transversing the stage throughout Madball concerts, The Aquarian described his stage presence as a tornado and powerhouse of energy.

== Personal life ==
Cricien is married. During the early days of his career, his wife traveled alongside him during tours. This resulted in them initially holding off on having children. Their son was born in 2011, and their daughter was born in 2016.

== Discography ==
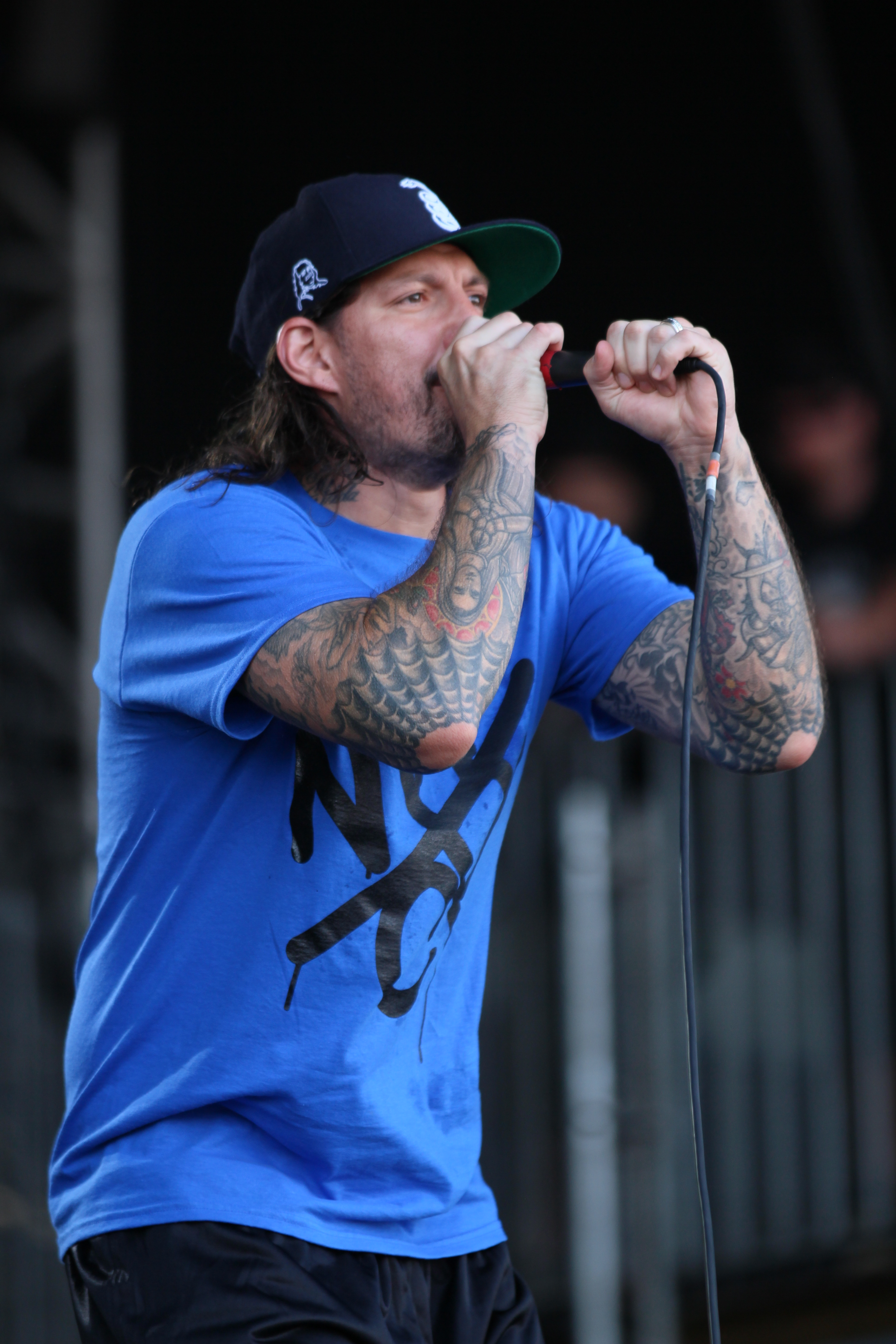
Cricien with Full Force in 2014

Madball

Studio albums

- Set It Off (1994)
- Demonstrating My Style (1996)
- Look My Way (1998)
- Hold It Down (2000)
- Legacy (2005)
- Infiltrate the System (2007)
- Empire (2010)
- Hardcore Lives (2014)
- For the Cause (2018)
- Not Your Kingdom (2026)

EPs

- Ball of Destruction (1989)
- Droppin' Many Suckers (1992)
- N.Y.H.C. EP (2004)
- Rebellion (2012)

Hazen Street

- Hazen Street (2004)

Freddy Madball

- Catholic Guilt (2009)

Guest appearances

- Agnostic Front — Something’s Gotta Give (backing vocals)
- H_{2}O — "Faster Than the World"
- Skarhead — Kings At Crime (backing vocals)
- Stepforward — "Go Away" (speech)
- New Found Glory – "Your Biggest Mistake" and "At Least I'm Known For Something"
- Terror — "Find My Way"
- Sick of it All — "Forked Tongue"
- H_{2}O — "A Thin Line"
- Skarhead — "D.M.S."
- Dead Reprise — "The Hammer Of Justice"

== Production discography ==
Year	Artist	Album	Role
2007	Agnostic Front	Warriors	Producer
2011	Agnostic Front	My Life My Way	Producer
2012	Wisdom in Chains	The Missing Links	Producer
2012	Madball	Rebellion	Executive producer
2015	Agnostic Front	The American Dream Died	Producer
2017	Agnostic Front / Powerhouse	Agnostic Front / Powerhouse	Producer
2018	Madball	For The Cause	Producer

== Sources ==
- Miret, Roger; Wiederhorn, Jon (2017), My Riot: Agnostic Front, Grit, Guts & Glory, New York City, New York: Lesser Gods, ISBN 978-1944713102
