= For the Cause (album) =

Studio album by Madball
- Released: June 15, 2018
- Genre: Hardcore
- Length: 32:33
- Label: Nuclear Blast
- Producer: Tim Armstrong

Madball chronology
Hardcore Lives (2014)	For the Cause (2018)	Not Your Kingdom (2026)

For the Cause is the ninth studio album by New York City hardcore punk band Madball. It is the last album to feature longtime bass player Jorge "Hoya Roc" Guerra.

== Background ==
On April 11, 2018, Madball announced For the Cause would be released on June 15, of that year. Lead singer Freddy Cricien stated

"We are beyond excited to finally drop 'For The Cause'. To say we're happy with the end result of all that we put into this is an understatement. This record accurately defines the current state of our band... our sound, our state of mind, our ambitions, our flaws and our attitude."

In addition Jorge Guerra added "We got a real good album. It feels like the movie 'Pulp Fiction'. We've got every style of hardcore in there. It feels like we've got something special."

The album of produced by Rancid frontman Tim Armstrong who also features on the song “The Fog”. A music video was later released for the song which he also appears in. An additional guest appearance comes from Body Count vocalist Ice-T also features on the song “Evil Ways” Additional music videos were made for the songs "Freight Train" and "Rev Up", a lyric video was also made for the song "Old Fashioned".

The album also seen the return on former guitarist Matt Henderson who had not been in the band to replace Brian "Mitts" Daniels who was dismissed from the band in October 2017. Henderson however did not join the band for their tour in support of the album.

In an interview with Revolver Cricien commented on the record stating:

We took more “chances” on this record than any previous one and can live with it because it’s still very much us. It’s real and honest. There’s plenty on there to satisfy the people that have supported us from every era of the band. How do you grow as a band or a person if you don’t take chances?

== Lyrics ==
Lyrically the album touches upon "living a genuine life", perseverance, the hypocrisy of authority and the evils of mankind to love and respect for lost friends and loved ones.

In an interview with Distorted Sound Magazine Cricien commented on what inspired him to write lyrics for the album:

Lyrically, just life man. Things going on around and being a father now. You get a different perspective on things. Participating in life and travelling around too. We’re fortunate enough that we get to travel with the band so we see other cultures and other politics compared to ours. It’s just life man, those things are inspired by a lot to do with my children and concerns about the world they’re coming into. A lot of different stuff. I’m not gonna lie, I have anger issues. I’ve got better with it over the years but with this music especially, it’s important to be pissed-off.

== Critical reception ==
Professional ratings
Review scores
Source	Rating
Metal Hammer	4/5 stars
Metal Injection	7/10
Punknews	3/5 stars
Distorted Sound	8/10
Blabbermouth.net	7/10
Exclaim!	positive

For the Cause received positive reviews from critics, Nik Young of Metal Hammer wrote “Freddy Cricien’s vocals are on point, the basslines are heavy, the trademark Spanish track doesn’t let them down and there isn’t a filler track to be found.” Eric Rosso of Punknews stated “If For the Cause gives Madball a reason to keep the torch burning nearly 25 years after their first full-length, then it’s a worthwhile contribution to their catalogue. If you like Madball, you’ll likely enjoy this.” Rich Webb of Distored Sound added “No bullshit. No theatrics or dramatic left turns. Just straight up, old fashioned hardcore music.” Jay H. Gorania of Blabbermouth.net wrote "For The Cause" is yet another shining example proving that Cricien and MADBALL are kings of hardcore.

Howie Abram’s of No Echo dubbed it the best hardcore album of 2018 stating "Very few bands who’ve been doing it as long as Madball has continue to expand their horizons, as well as the horizons of hardcore itself. The group takes some well calculated risks on For the Cause, yet still manage to deliver an LP chock full of gritty, groove-heavy street level hardcore. Not your older sibling’s Madball".

== Track listing ==
No.	Title	Length
1.	"Smile Now Pay Later"	3:32
2.	"Rev. Up"	2:21
3.	"Freight Train"	2:39
4.	"Tempest"	2:26
5.	"Old Fashioned"	2:14
6.	"Evil Ways"	1:47
7.	"Lone Wolf"	2:38
8.	"Damaged Goods"	2:20
9.	"The Frog"	3:11
10.	"Es Tu Vida"	2:28
11.	"For You"	3:18
12.	"For the Cause"	4:04

== Personnel ==
Madball

- Freddy Cricien — vocals
- Jorge "Hoya Roc" Guerra — bass
- Mike Justian — drums

Additional musicians

- Matt Henderson — guitars
- Tim Armstrong — “The Frog”
- Ice-T — “Evil Ways”

Production

- Tim Armstrong — production
- Freddy Cricien — executive production
- Tue Madsen — mixing, mastering
- Kevin Bivona — engineering
- Jesse Bivona, Justin Bivona — assistant engineering

== Charts ==
Chart (2018)	Peak position
Belgian Albums (Ultratop Flanders)	77
Belgian Albums (Ultratop Wallonia)	175
German Albums (Offizielle Top 100)	28
Swiss Albums (Schweizer Hitparade)	29
UK Rock and Metal (Official Charts)	33
UK Independent Album Breakers (Official Charts)	10
US Heatseekers (Billboard)	6
US Top Rock Albums (Billboard)	50
US Top Hard Rock Albums (Billboard)	14
