= Can't Stop Won't Stop =

Can't Stop Won't Stop may refer to:

- Can't Stop Won't Stop (book), a book written by Jeff Chang
- Can't Stop Won't Stop (album), a 2008 album by The Maine
- "Can't Stop Won't Stop" (Usher song), 2012
- "Can't Stop, Won't Stop" (Young Gunz song), 2003
- "Can't Stop, Won't Stop", a 2000 song by Madball from Hold It Down
- "Can't Stop Won't Stop", a 2020 song by Meekz from Can't Stop Won't Stop
- "Can't Stop Won't Stop", a 2023 song by King Combs and Kodak Black
- Can't Stop, Won't Stop: A Bad Boy Story, a 2017 documentary about Sean Combs
