= Hazen Street =

American rock group

- Origin: New York City, New York, U.S.
- Genres: Rap rock; hardcore punk; heavy metal
- Years active: 2004–2006; 2009; 2011; 2012–present
- Labels: DC Flag; Epic
- Members: Toby Morse; Freddy Cricien; Hoya Roc; Mackie Jayson; David Kennedy
- Past members: Chad Gilbert; Brian "Mitts" Daniels

Hazen Street (also typeset Hazen St.) is an American supergroup that formed in early 2004. The band features Freddy Cricien and Hoya Roc (Madball); Toby Morse (H_{2}O), David Kennedy (Box Car Racer, Over My Dead Body, later Angels & Airwaves), and Mackie (Cro-Mags & Bad Brains). Chad Gilbert (Shai Hulud and New Found Glory) co-wrote and helped record every song on the album, but he was soon dismissed from Hazen Street by New Found Glory's record label Drive-Thru Records due to a contract dispute. He was replaced by Brian "Mitts" Daniels of Madball.

== History ==
In March 2004, the band performed at the ExtremeThing festival. In April and May 2004, the group supported Story of the Year on their headlining US tour. Hazen Street released their self-titled debut album, Hazen Street on Joel and Benji Madden's DC Flag Records. On August 31, 2005, the band posted an update on their website, reporting that they would begin to work on a new record at the end of 2005, label to be announced. However, there has been no website updates since then, and nothing has been heard regarding this new album, presumably due to Kennedy's full-time involvement with Angels & Airwaves.

In November 2006, it was announced that their song "Are You Ready?" would be the official theme song for WWE Survivor Series 2006, the twentieth annual Survival Series pay-per-view. The event took place at the Wachovia Center in Philadelphia on November 26, 2006.

Hazen Street reunited for a one-off performance on June 21, 2009, supporting H_{2}O in a show in New York City.

Hazen Street again reunited to perform at The East Coast Tsunami Fest 2011, a Hardcore/Punk /Metal festival that took place in Reading, Pennsylvania.

In 2012, Hazen Street performed at the Groezrock festival in Belgium. The band is set to do a performance with Rancid and several other acts in New York City.

Together with Madball and H2O, Hazen Street was part of the Rebellion Tour 2023, playing shows all over Europe.

== Band members ==
- Toby Morse – vocals (2004–2006, 2009, 2011, 2012–present)
- Freddy Cricien – vocals (2004–2006, 2009, 2011, 2012–present)
- Hoya Roc – bass (2004–2006, 2009, 2011, 2012–present)
- Mackie Jayson – drums, percussion (2004–2006, 2009, 2011, 2012–present)
- David Kennedy – lead guitar (2004–2006, 2009, 2022–Present)

=== Former members ===
- Chad Gilbert – rhythm guitar, backing vocals (2004, died 2026)
- Brian "Mitts" Daniels – rhythm guitar, backing vocals (2005–2006)
- Garrett Krinsky – tambourine, backing vocals (2004–2005)
- Jason Lederman – drums, percussion (2004)

== Discography ==
- Hazen Street (2004)

== Videography ==
- Fool the World (2004)

== In popular culture ==
- "Hazen Street" is a two-way street in Queens which leads to the Rikers Island Bridge to Rikers Island Prison Facility, possibly inspiring the band's name.
- The band's song, "Fool the World" was featured on the NHL 2005 and Madden NFL 2005 soundtracks.
- Their song "Back Home" was featured on the NBA 2K5 soundtrack.
- Their song, "Are You Ready" was included on the 2004 Warped Tour Compilation and in the DVD Nitro Circus 2 and it was also the theme song for the 2006 WWE Survivor Series.
