= Hazen Street (album) =

Studio album by Hazen Street
- Released: July 20, 2004
- Recorded: 2004
- Genre: Rap rock; alternative metal; hardcore punk; post-hardcore; pop-punk
- Length: 37:57
- Label: DC Flag; Epic
- Producer: Howard Benson

Singles from Hazen Street
- 1. "Fool the World" Released: June 28, 2004

Professional ratings
Review scores
| Source | Rating |
|---|---|
| Allmusic | link |

Hazen Street is the debut studio album by the American supergroup Hazen Street. Borne out of an original collaboration between Toby Morse and David Kennedy and named for the address of the New York City prison in which ex-Madball vocalist Freddy Cricien did a stint, the band mixed hard-hitting contemporary hardcore with metal, rap-rock, and pop overtones. Hazen Street signed with Benji and Joel Madden's Epic-distributed DC Flag imprint in 2003 and set to work on their debut with producer Howard Benson. Guitarist Chad Gilbert of New Found Glory also performed on the record, but commitments to New Found Glory kept him from touring in support with Hazen Street. The self-titled effort was then issued in July 2004.

== Track listing ==
All songs by Hazen Street and Chad Gilbert.

| No. | Title | Length |
|---|---|---|
| 1. | "Are You Ready?" | 2:21 |
| 2. | "Fool the World" | 3:21 |
| 3. | "Written" | 3:05 |
| 4. | "Sorry" | 3:11 |
| 5. | "Trouble" | 3:52 |
| 6. | "In Memory of" | 3:35 |
| 7. | "Tomorrow" | 4:02 |
| 8. | "All That" | 3:12 |
| 9. | "Back Home" | 3:12 |
| 10. | "Crossroads" | 3:02 |
| 11. | "Stick Up Kid" | 3:07 |
| 12. | "Hazen (Outro)" | 1:57 |
| Total length: | | 37:57 |

== Members ==
- Toby Morse – vocals
- Freddy Cricien – vocals
- Jorge "Hoya Roc" Guerra – bass
- Mackie Jayson – drums
- David Kennedy – guitar
- Chad Gilbert – additional performance and songwriting
- Benji Madden – background vocals on "Are You Ready?" and "All That"
- Joel Madden – background vocals on "Are You Ready?" and "All That"

== In other media ==
- "Are You Ready" was the official theme song of WWE Survivor Series 2006
- "Back Home" was featured on NBA 2K5
- "Fool The World" was featured in NHL 2005 and in Madden NFL 2005

== Billboard chart positions ==
- Top Heatseekers, #30
- Billboard 200,#198
