= Hardcore Lives =

Studio album by Madball
- Released: June 27, 2014
- Recorded: March 2014
- Studio: System Recordings (Grafton, Massachusetts) and Pinecrust Studios (Miami, Florida)
- Genre: Hardcore punk
- Length: 31:55

Madball chronology
Empire (2010)	Hardcore Lives (2014)	For the Cause (2018)

Hardcore Lives is the eighth studio album by New York hardcore band Madball. It was released on June 27, 2014. This was the last album to feature guitarist Brian "Mitts" Daniels before his departure.

== Background and history ==
On March 10, 2014, it was announced that Madball had entered the studio to begin recording their upcoming eighth studio album, which was scheduled for a mid-summer release. The band announced they were recording tracks with Ken Susi at System Recordings in Grafton, Massachusetts, and that additional recording would take place at Pinecrust Studios in Miami, Florida, with Jonathan Nuñez. Also, the album would be mixed by Zeuss, who previously worked with the band on their 2005 album Legacy and their 2007 album Infiltrate the System.

On April 11, it was announced that the title of the upcoming album was Hardcore Lives, and that it would be released on June 27, 2014. Vocalist Freddy Cricien commented on the album title, saying:

I shouted 'Hardcore Lives' on MADBALL's first release, 'Ball Of Destruction'. I was twelve then. It wasn't pre-planned or written down... It was an ad-lib that I just threw out there and we kept it! Back then, there was no choice, really, not the way we were recording — two-track live at Don Fury's... NYHC style! I feel the sentiment behind the expression still holds true today, maybe even more so. Hence the reason we finally chose to use it as a title. Sure, it's about waving the flag for our genre/culture, etc. I've always felt that 'we as a scene' had to scream just a lil louder... to be heard! That said, 'Hardcore Lives', at least to us, is not just about a cool 'catchphrase,' it's about that rebellious spirit that doesn't give in... in life, music, whatever. It's about growing, evolving, and maintaining your integrity in the process. It's about family, overcoming adversity, and respect. All the things that matter inside and outside of the music realm. It's for everyone and anyone with an open mind and heart.

— Freddy Cricien

On April 25, a lyric video for the song "DNA" was released. On April 30, an in-studio trailer was released.

== Critical reception ==
Professional ratings
Review scores
Source	Rating
Alternative Press	positive
Ramzine	8/10
The Music	3/5

Alternative Press wrote “If you’re expecting anything more than honest, killer hardcore, Hardcore Lives will be a bit dull around the edges for you. But those expecting true old-school New York City hardcore will be completely satisfied with new additions like the punky “Doc Marten Stomp,” the Spanish-sung “Mi Palabra” and the ultra-heavy “DNA” to Madball’s already extensive, if not slightly exhausting, canon.”

== Track listing ==
No.	Title	Length
1.	"Intro"	1:13
2.	"Hardcore Lives"	2:06
3.	"The Balance"	2:49
4.	"Doc Marten Stomp"	3:23
5.	"DNA"	2:29
6.	"True School"	2:13
7.	"The Here and Now"	2:20
8.	"Nothing to Me"	2:51
9.	"My Armor"	1:37
10.	"Beacon of Light"	1:59
11.	"Born Strong"	2:13
12.	"Spirit"	1:52
13.	"Mi Palabra"	2:08
14.	"NBNC"	0:27
15.	"For the Judged"	2:15
Total length:		31:55

Bonus tracks
No.	Title	Length
16.	"The Beast"	2:09
17.	"Spit on Your Grave 2014" (re-recorded from Set It Off)	1:51
Total length:		35:55

== Credits ==
Madball

- Freddy Cricien – vocals
- Hoya Roc – bass
- Mitts – guitars
- Mike Justian – drums

Additional musicians

- Scott Vogel – guest vocals on "True School"
- Candace Puopolo – guest vocals on "Born Strong"
- Toby Morse – guest vocals on "My Armor"
- Chad Gilbert – backing vocals on "My Armor
- CM Punk – backing vocals on "My Armor"

Production

- Ken Susi – recording, tracking, engineering
- Jonathan Nuñez – recording
- Zeuss – mixing, mastering

== Charts ==
Chart (2014)	Peak position
Austrian Albums (Ö3 Austria)	70
Belgian Albums (Ultratop Flanders)	148
Belgian Albums (Ultratop Wallonia)	188
German Albums (Offizielle Top 100)	43
Swiss Albums (Schweizer Hitparade)	61
