= Everything You Know =

Studio album by Wisdom In Chains
- Released: 2009
- Genre: Hardcore punk
- Length: 50:50
- Label: I Scream

Wisdom In Chains chronology
Class War (2007)	Everything You Know (2009)	The Missing Links (2012)

Everything You Know is the third studio album by Pennsylvania hardcore punk band Wisdom In Chains. It was released in 2009 on I Scream Records.

== Track listing ==
No.	Title	Length
1.	"Intro"	1:40
2.	"Guilty"	1:04
3.	"Bully"	0:59
4.	"Chasing the Dragon"	3:23
5.	"Back to the Ocean"	1:45
6.	"Perfect Day"	2:37
7.	"SxE Dad"	0:43
8.	"The Cost of Living"	2:30
9.	"Everything You Know..."	1:15
10.	"The Death of Whiskey Finger"	2:40
11.	"Earth Gods"	2:28
12.	"Tragedy"	2:26
13.	"I Go On"	4:59
14.	"Book of Rhymes"	1:03
15.	"Start Living"	2:58
16.	"Girls Lie, Cops Lie, Dogs Love"	2:36
17.	"Take Me Home"	4:20
18.	"The Golden Rule"	2:47
19.	"Burn It Down"	1:21
20.	"Splinter"	7:16
