= Not Your Kingdom =

Studio album by Madball
- Released: July 24, 2026
- Studios: The Boneyard Studios in Nashville, Tennessee
- Genre: Hardcore
- Length: 29:55
- Label: Nuclear Blast
- Producer: Andrew Baylis

Madball chronology
For the Cause (2018)	Not Your Kingdom (2026)

Singles from Not Your Kindgom
- 1. "Rebel Kids" Released: May 14, 2026; 2. "Tethered" Released: June 10, 2026

Not Your Kingdom is the tenth studio album by New York City hardcore punk band Madball, released on July 24, 2026, via Nuclear Blast Records. It is their first album since Set It Off to not feature bass player Jorge "Hoya Roc" Guerra, who left the band in 2023.

== Background and recording ==
Not Your Kingdom is Madball's first studio album since 2018's For the Cause, marking the longest gap between studio albums in the band's career. A large part of this was due to the departure of long-time bass player Jorge "Hoya Roc" Guerra, who wrote many of the band's riffs. The album's release was also delayed from March 2026, due to multiple setbacks. Lead singer Freddy Cricien commented that "the album was done, but then we had to get it remixed, 'cause we didn't like the first mix. And then artwork got held up."

Not Your Kingdom was recorded at the Boneyard Studios in Nashville, Tennessee, with additional recording coming from Jeff "Stress" Davis and Chuck Treece at Chop Shop Studios in New York. The album was produced and engineered by the group of Andrew Baylis, Aiden Thompson, and Grady Saxman, and mixed and mastered by Lee Rouse. The album's cover art was photographed by Cornell Capa.

All four members of the band recorded together. During the recording process Cricien encouraged drummer Mike Justian to be more insistent with his riffs, justian had originally refrained from sharing riffs as he felt it wasn’t his place. Despite the eight year gab between Not Your Kingdom and their last album For the Cause Cricien noted the band did not feel any pressure to finish the album and get it out. Instead he stated the process was "a pleasure rather than being a stressful one."

The album was worked on over a period of two years from 2024 to 2026. Cricien commented on the song "Rebel Kids", stating: "the first track written for this album and actually was completely put together probably two years ago ... or so." Much of the early work on the album took place remotely using voice notes and sharing files this was due to all the band members living in different states.

== Musical style and themes ==
The album's lyrics touch on lead singer Freddy Cricien's perspective on the state of the world and human condition. In an interview with Blabbermouth.net, Cricien commented on the album's style, stating:

It's by far the most diverse Madball album, even more so than 'For the Cause', which I thought 'For the Cause', we did a lot of different stuff, which we were happy to do, because you can't just keep doing the same album over and over."

In a separate press release he noted:

Obviously, you wanna hear our sound, but I like that we were venturing out and doing different stuff on that one. And this one is — yeah, there's some songs that are reminiscent of 'Can't Stop, Won't Stop'. It's very eclectic in the best way, I think. It's gonna be for the people to judge. But I'm super proud of it. Writing with these guys was very natural. We all were hungry. It's been 2018 since we put out an album."

== Release and promotion ==
The albums first single "Rebel Kids" was released on May, 14, 2026, marking Madball's first release since 2018. The song was accompanied along with an official music video upon release. The albums second single "Tethered" was released on June 10, along with an official music video. In an interview Cricien commented on the song stating "To my ears, it has a 'nostalgic' feel but still manages to come across as something new for us! Made sense for it to be the second single to demonstrate the diversity of the album - the whole thing is a story, a ride of sorts and this one as the opener really sets a good pace sonically and lyrically." Upon the album’s release a third music video was released for the song "Don’t Missstep."

Madball toured Europe in July and August in support of Not Your Kingdom. The group also toured Mexico in September, Europe in October with Desolated and Combust and will support Pain of Truth on their North American tour in November.

== Critical reception ==
Professional ratings
Review scores
Source	Rating
Away From Life	5/5 stars
Blabbermouth.net	8.5/10
Kerrang!	4/5 stars
BrooklynVegan	Positive
Metal.de	8/10
New Noise Magazine	Positive
Ox-Fanzine	Mildly Positive

Upon release the album has been met with positive reception. Blabbermouth.net wrote "Freddie sounds monstrous throughout, too: his streetwise charisma and genre-defining voice reach a new level of potency here. From the opening, cut-throat intensity of "Tethered" onwards, MADBALL are on vintage form, and at a perfectly proportioned 30 minutes, "Not Your Kingdom" is arguably the most cohesive and complete record that they have made yet." Howie Abram’s of New Noise Magazine stated "The guitar work of Mike Gurnari is high-powered, and the rhythm section of the other Mike (Justian) and Paul Delaney (of Black Anvil fame) is thunderous, to say the least. It goes without saying that vocalist Freddy Cricien walks it like he talks it with regard to lyrics."

Metal.de wrote "Anyone who feared that MADBALL would surrender the mosh pit to younger bands without a fight following Hoya’s departure is proven wrong by *Not Your Kingdom*. The New York institution delivers not merely a rehash of their past work, but a multifaceted hardcore album that unleashes unbridled rage at just the right moments." BrooklynVegan added "they do not fix what ain’t broke. Madball’s heavy, knuckle-busting approach to hardcore changed the game in the early ’90s and they remain one of the most influential bands in the hardcore scene today. When they stick to their guns and dish out ragers like the ones on this LP, there’s no denying them."

Ox-Fanzine was slightly more critical of the album noting "Anyone expecting genuine surprises or experiments has come to the wrong place. Unlike many other bands in the genre—including their "brother band" Agnostic Front—Madball still sound urgent even after more than 30 years. An album that offers few surprises but is nonetheless convincing."

== Track listing ==
No.	Title	Length
1.	"Tethered"	2:38
2.	"Flammable"	0:59
3.	"Rebelude"	0:47
4.	"Rebel Kids"	3:17
5.	"Don't Misstep"	1:34
6.	"What Say You"	3:23
7.	"Stab Wounds"	2:47
8.	"Sunrise"	1:03
9.	"Life's a Mural"	2:35
10.	"Family First"	3:10
11.	"Clockwork"	2:31
12.	"IWI"	0:29
13.	"The Ride"	2:16
14.	"Chase a Dream"	2:26
Total length:		29:55

== Personnel ==
Madball

- Freddy Cricien – vocals
- Mike Gurnari – guitars
- Paul Delaney – bass
- Mike Justian – drums

Production

- Andrew Baylis – production, engineering
- Grady Saxman – production, engineering
- Aiden Thompson – production, engineering
- Lee Rouse – mixing, mastering

== Charts ==
Chart performance for Not Your Kingdom
Chart (2026)	Peak position
French Physical Albums (SNEP)	103
French Rock & Metal Albums (SNEP)	31
German Albums (Offizielle Top 100)	36
German Rock & Metal Albums (Offizielle Top 100)	4
UK Indie Album Breakers (Official Charts)	10
