= Class War (album) =

Studio album by Wisdom In Chains
- Released: 2007
- Genre: Hardcore punk
- Length: 38:05
- Label: Eulogy

Wisdom In Chains chronology
Die Young (2005)	Class War (2007)	Everything You Know (2009)

Professional ratings
Review scores
Source	Rating
AllMusic	3/5 stars

Class War is the second studio album by Pennsylvania hardcore punk band Wisdom In Chains. It was released in 2007 on Eulogy Recordings.

== Track list ==
No.	Title	Length
1.	"The Sound Of The End"	2:10
2.	"Early Grave"	3:07
3.	"I Don't Care"	1:10
4.	"Cap City"	3:12
5.	"Class War"	1:37
6.	"This Is Mine"	0:20
7.	"My Promise"	4:09
8.	"Living In A Fog"	1:27
9.	"Killing Time"	2:50
10.	"Life Isn't Fair"	1:13
11.	"Horrible Crimes"	1:13
12.	"No Smiles In The Ghetto"	2:29
13.	"The Land Of Kings"	1:19
14.	"No Justice For The Working Man"	3:37
15.	"London Gospel"	2:40
16.	"Violent Assault"	3:50
17.	"[Untitled]"	1:42
