= Empire (Madball album) =

Studio album by Madball
- Released: October 12, 2010
- Genre: Hardcore
- Length: 34:59
- Label: Good Fight Music
- Producer: Erik Rutan

Madball chronology
Infiltrate the System (2007)	Empire (2010)	Hardcore Lives (2014)

Empire is the seventh studio album by New York City hardcore punk band Madball. It is the only album to feature drummer Jay Weinberg.

== Background ==
Following the recording of the album Madball added drummer Jay Weinberg to their lineup, the group recorded the album at Mana Recording Studios in St. Petersburg, Florida. The album was produced by Cannibal Corpse guitarist Erik Rutan. In August 2012 frontman Freddy Cricien announced the album would be released on October 12. The band also signed with Nuclear Blast to release the album in Europe.

Cricien commented in an interview on working with Rutan stating "he has been great to work with. He's definitely a perfectionist, which I have no problem with. It's going to benefit us in the end! He's got his own techniques like everyone does, so he's going to bring a different dynamic into the sound/mix." In a separate interview Cricien added "We got a little more raw production, a little bit more organic-sounding...I think it's one of our best releases in a long, long time. It's actually the best in my opinion, but everybody always says that."

The album was released on October 12, 2010, and sold 1,500 copies in its first week. The band later released a special vinyl version with new cover art.

== Critical reception ==
Professional ratings
Review scores
Source	Rating
Lambgoat	6/10
Punknews	3/5 stars
The Music	4/5 stars
Ox-fanzine	4.5/5 stars

Joshua of Lambgoat gave the album a mixed review stating "Like AC/DC, you know what you're getting with Madball, but that doesn't mean that it's bad." He gave additional praise to Hoya Roc and guitarist Mitts for coming up for continuing to come up with songs that sound like Madball. David of Punknews gave a mixed review adding "this is a fun, catchy album, but it's not a great album. You can probably spend a bunch of very enjoyable hours listening to it (again, if you like NYHC). But it's not a classic." German reviewer Ox-fanzine gave the album a positive review stating "while other bands struggle to deliver accurate hardcore music, the New Yorkers make it all sound completely effortless and spontaneous."

== Track listing ==
No.	Title	Length
1.	"Invigorate"	2:03
2.	"Danger Zone"	2:09
3.	"Timeless"	2:08
4.	"All or Nothing"	4:08
5.	"Glory Years"	1:58
6.	"Empire"	2:59
7.	"Shatterproof"	1:48
8.	"The End"	2:53
9.	"Con Fuerza"	2:29
10.	"R.A.H.C."	1:47
11.	"Hurt You"	0:46
12.	""Tough Guy""	1:13
13.	"Dark Horse"	2:46
14.	"Spider's Web"	2:08
15.	"Delete"	2:36
16.	"Rebel4life18"	2:59

== Personnel ==
Madball

- Freddy Cricien — vocals
- Jorge "Hoya Roc" Guerra — bass
- Brian "Mitts" Daniels — guitar
- Jay Weinberg — drums

Additional musicians

- Vinnie Stigma (guitar) — "All or Nothing" and "Hurt You"
- Erik Rutan (guitar) — "All Or Nothing" and "Hurt You"
- Roger Miret (vocals) — "Shatterproof"

Production

- Erik Rutan — producer, recording, engineer, mixing

== Charts ==
Chart (2010)	Peak position
US Heatseekers	15
