= The God Rhythm =

Studio album by Wisdom In Chains
- Released: June 30, 2015
- Genre: Hardcore punk
- Label: Fast break! records

Wisdom In Chains chronology
The Missing Links (2012)	The God Rhythm (2015)

The God Rhythm is the fifth studio album of Wisdom In Chains. It is their first album under their new record label "Fast break! records". It was released on June 30, 2015.

== Track list ==
1. People Die
2. When We Were Young
3. Resonate
4. How Far Will You Go
5. Songs To My Killer
6. Mathematics
7. Fatherless
8. Best Of Me
9. The God Rhythm
10. Violent Americans
11. Joey Ramone
12. Skinhead Gang
13. Outro
