= Die Young (album) =

Studio album by Wisdom In Chains
- Released: 2005; 2007 (Reissue)
- Genre: Hardcore punk
- Length: 52:36
- Label: Spook City; Eulogy (Reissue)

Wisdom In Chains chronology
Wisdom In Chains (2003)	Die Young (2005)	Class War (2007)

Original cover

Die Young is the first official studio album by Pennsylvania hardcore punk band Wisdom In Chains. It was released in 2005 on Spook City Records, and re-issued in 2007 on Eulogy Recordings with new cover art.

== Track listing ==
No.	Title	Length
1.	"We're Not Helping"	3:03
2.	"Liar"	0:45
3.	"Nowhere"	2:33
4.	"One Of These Days"	1:57
5.	"Fade"	2:11
6.	"Dragging Me Down"	2:54
7.	"The Game Of War"	1:47
8.	"Pass The Cup"	3:10
9.	"Friday Night Drama"	0:40
10.	"Die Young"	2:19
11.	"Fighting In The Streets"	2:04
12.	"Too Far Gone"	1:14
13.	"Get To Steppin'"	1:34
14.	"Out Of Season"	2:36
15.	"Time To Play"	1:42
16.	"Smash Your Face"	1:04
17.	"Nothing Like You"	3:51
18.	"Dragging Me Down (live)*"	2:48
19.	"We're Not Helping (live)*"	3:34
20.	"Snakes*"	10:50

- Appears on 2007 reissue
