= The Missing Links (album) =

Studio album by Wisdom In Chains
- Released: 2012
- Genre: Hardcore punk
- Length: 44:21
- Label: I Scream

Wisdom In Chains chronology
Everything You Know (2009)	The Missing Links (2012)	The God Rhythm (2015)

The Missing Links is the fourth studio album by Pennsylvania hardcore punk band Wisdom In Chains. It was released in 2012 on I Scream Records.

== Track list ==
No.	Title	Length
1.	"Defend Protect"	3:30
2.	"Block Out The Sky"	1:35
3.	"Traveling"	2:22
4.	"Peace To My Family"	1:29
5.	"My Friend"	4:21
6.	"Don't Bring Me Down"	1:50
7.	"The Missing Links (Annunaki Genetics)"	6:05
8.	"Snakes"	2:37
9.	"Ghost Of Buddy"	2:34
10.	"Top Of The World (feat. Slaine)"	5:49
11.	"In Case You Forgot"	1:51
12.	"Sleep"	4:17
13.	"Victorium"	6:01
