= Madball =

New York hardcore band

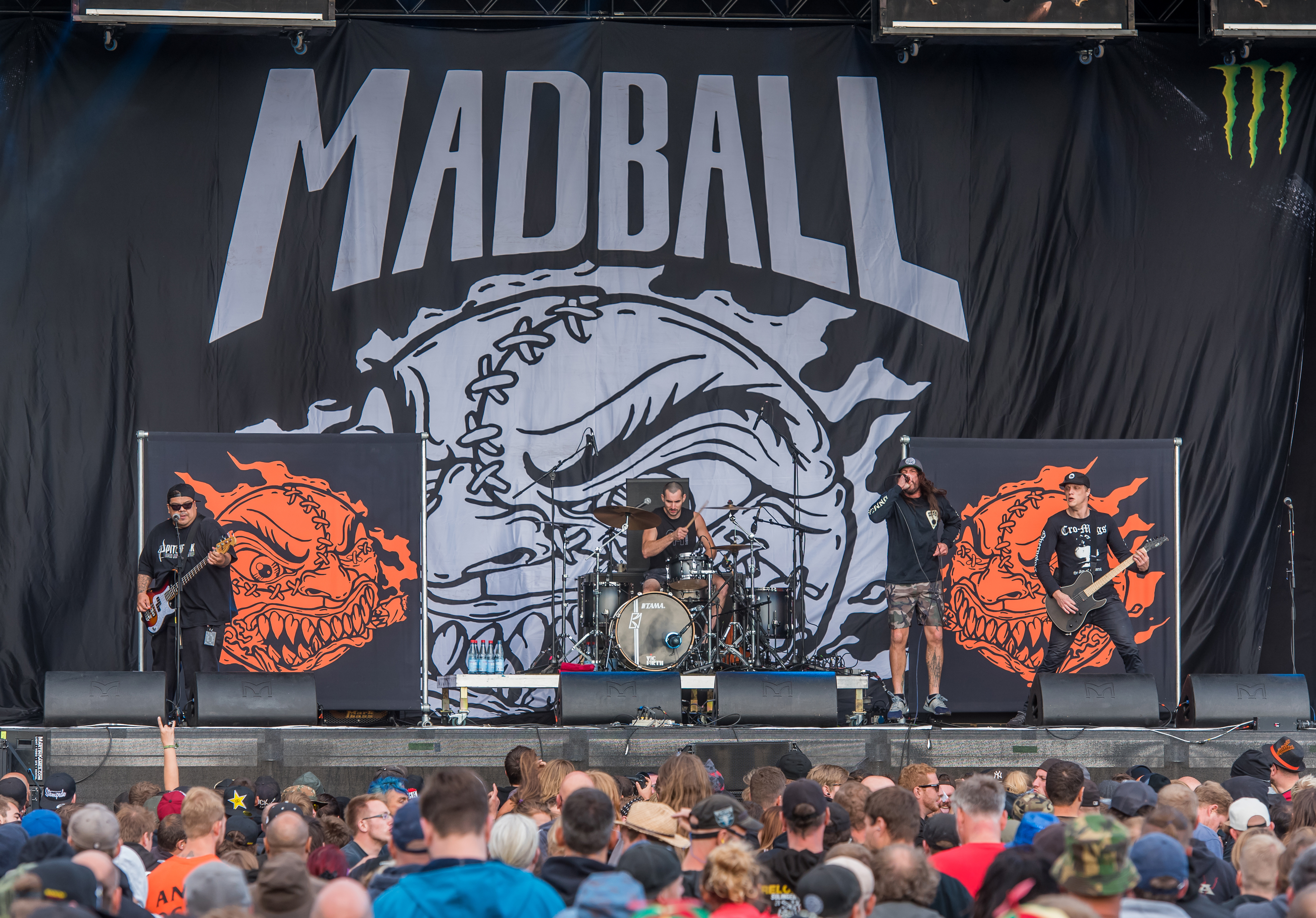
- Madball in 2018

Background information
- Origin: New York City, U.S.
- Genres: Hardcore punk; tough guy hardcore
- Years active: 1988−2001, 2002−present
- Labels: Good Fight; Ferret; Wreck-Age; Roadrunner; Epitaph; I Scream; Thorp; Nuclear Blast
- Spinoff of: Agnostic Front
- Members: Freddy Cricien; Mike Justian; Mike Gurnari; Paul Delaney
- Past members: Vinnie Stigma; Rob Rosario; Will Shepler; John Lafata; Darren Morgenthaler; Rigg Ross; Roger Miret; Matt Henderson; Walter Ryan; Ben Dussault; Mackie Jayson; Igor Wouters; Jay Weinberg; Brian "Mitts" Daniels; Jorge "Hoya Roc" Guerra
- Website: madballhc.com

Madball is an American New York hardcore band. Originated in the late 1980s as a side project of Agnostic Front, the band developed after Agnostic Front's vocalist Roger Miret would let his younger half-brother Freddy Cricien take the microphone and perform lead vocals during Agnostic Front shows. Following Agnostic Front's 1992 disbandment, Madball became the members' main project and many became a part of the band who were never in Agnostic Front.

They initially gained prominence with their 1994 debut album Set It Off. Following three more album releases the group briefly disbanded in 2001 but quickly returned the following year in 2002. In total they have released nine studio albums and four EPs. They are often mentioned as an influential band in the New York hardcore scene and the overall hardcore genre.

== History ==
=== Early years and formation (1986–1990) ===
The idea for Madball can trace its roots back to when then their lead vocalist Freddy Cricien was around seven years old and visited with his brother Roger Miret in New York City. He began to perform on stage with Agnostic Front, singing a few songs which would become a staple of their shows during this period. Shortly after, he began to join the band on tour. During this time he became the group's unofficial mascot and was given the name “Agnostic Fred”. With Vinnie Stigma later giving him the nickname Madball. While Agnostic Front was recording their 1987 album Liberty and Justice for… they talked to Howie Abrams about recording material with Cricien as the vocalist.

Madball was then founded shortly after in 1988 and featured most of Agnostic Front's members. Madball consisted of Agnostic Front's vocalist Roger Miret on bass, Vinnie Stigma on guitar, Will Shepler on drums, and then 12-year-old vocalist Freddy Cricien. The group’s first official show came that year in New Rochelle. It was originally supposed to be an Agnostic Front show but the bands bassist Craig Ahead and guitarist at Steve Martin could not make the show. So Miret made an audible and turned it into the first Madball show.

Madball's first few performances consisted of previously unused Agnostic Front songs. Madball's first release was the Ball of Destruction EP in 1989. After years of playing regional shows in and around the New York area, a second guitarist, Matt Henderson, joined the band. By then, they recorded and released the EP, Droppin' Many Suckers, for Wreck-Age Records.

=== Set it Off Demonstrating My Style and Look My Way (1991–1999) ===
The group's first official tour was with Agnostic Front on one of their final Europe tours before their hiatus in 1992. One year later, Miret left the band and was replaced on bass by Jorge "Hoya Roc" Guerra — a good friend of Freddy Cricien — who was looking for a new band as his band, Dmize, was breaking up. When Agnostic Front went on hiatus in 1992 Madball became the band members flagship band. That same year the group released their second EP called Droppin' Many Suckers.

In 1993 Madball played a couple of shows in Argentina to establish themselves in South America; this tour also marked the debut of Jorge "Hoya Roc" Guerra. The new incarnation of the band was caught the attention of Roadrunner Records and signed with them in 1994 to release their first full-length album Set It Off in 1994. The album is viewed as a classic in the hardcore genre with Jason Anderson stating "Set It Off is a document of this hardcore outfit at their most menacing, both musically and lyrically." Madball then embarked on their first ever U.S. tour in support of the album. During this period the band started gaining a wider fanbase in both the US and internationally following a relentless touring schedule that culminated in a appearances at the 1995 Dynamo Open Air festival in front of 120,000 people. Madball started to become a popular live act. They started touring all over the world in places like Europe, Japan, Australia and South America with large acts such as Slayer and Black Sabbath.

In 1995, Madball participated in the N.Y.H.C. documentary. Extensive interviews were conducted with Freddy for the documentary. The film also featured the July 29, 1995 performance at the now-defunct "Coney Island High". Freddy's brother, Roger, broke several vertebrae in his back at that show, requiring him to be in traction for the better part of a year.

The following year saw Madball release their second full-length album Demonstrating My Style. The band had also started touring steadily, and began building a sizable fan base outside their hometown. Vinnie Stigma left the band when Agnostic Front returned from hiatus in 1997.

Consisting of Cricien, Henderson, Guerra, and new drummer John Lafata (former drummer in Neglect), the band recorded Look My Way, which was released in early 1998. The album was met with positive reception with AllMusic stating, "with Look My Way, Madball have become the premier purveyors." Following the album’s release Madball embarked on their first tour of Australia, they then spent the rest of the year touring the US and Europe.

=== Hold it Down and mini hiatus (2000–2004) ===
In 2000 the group decided leave RoadRunner and sign with the well known independent label Epitaph Records to release their fourth album Hold It Down. Cricien later explained that the label switch was due to them not getting much attention from Roadrunner as they wanted to "focus on newer trends." Like previous efforts this record was also met with critical praise, the Courier News wrote that the album "is as loud, fast and hard as ever, but the 11-year-old band also is writing songs better with more emphasis on strong lyrics and melodies." With this recorded Madball started to get exposed to a larger punk rock audience. Following the album’s release Matt Henderson left the band and was replaced by guitarist Rob Rosario.

However shortly after the release of "Hold It Down", lead singer Freddy Cricien was charged with attempted criminal possession of a weapon and was sentenced to six months in prison. Then following his release Madball cancelled an upcoming tour in February 2001 and then announced their dissolution in the beginning of March. However the group did embark on a European farewell tour. Their dissolution was due to a combination of exhaustion from constant touring and recording, as well as ongoing lineup disputes: This resulted in them not getting to take advantage of their newly found audience. But decided to reform in late 2002 with a new line-up featuring Brian "Mitts" Daniels and Rigg Ross. They held their reunion tour in December of 2002. In August of 2003 Madball toured the U.S. alongside Death Threat. They also took part in the Rise Of Brutality tour the following month alongside Hatebreed. In September of 2003 the group signed with Thorp Records. The following year Madball released a compilation album entitled Best of Madball along with the N.Y.H.C. EP (EP). In December 2004, they embarked on a European headlining tour.

Cricien later reflected on the bands hiatus stating in a 2018 interview stating:

We thought we were done, like Madball was gonna be done at this point and it was never gonna happen again. And sure enough, it did. I think that also helped our longevity, because we cleared our heads of a lot of things [and] kind of came out swinging a little bit harder on the second round. I think that might have helped us, actually. After that period, I decided to sort of take control of the band business-wise and so on. Before that, I didn't really care about that part of it. I was just like, "Yeah, all right, let's go play, let's have fun, whatever." This was an outlet for us; it was therapeutic for us. Like, "Let's just go do whatever we do. We make a couple bucks? Cool. If we don't? Well, we traveled around, we got to see some cool stuff."

=== Legacy and Infiltrate the System (2005-2010) ===
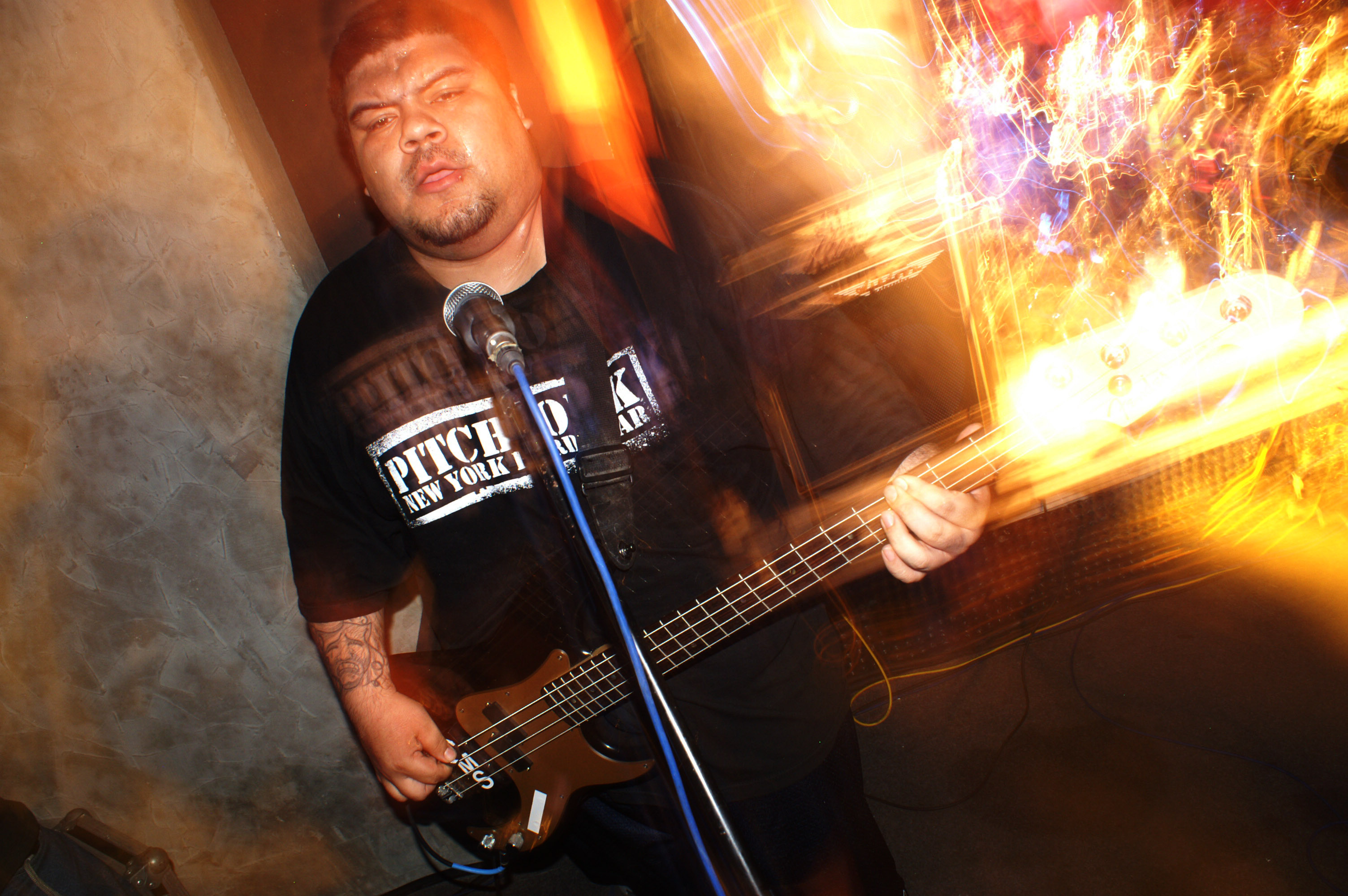
Bassist Jorge "Hoya Roc" Guerra performing in 2006

After playing dates in the US and Japan, Madball signed with Ferret Records in April of 2005. They then began recording their next album in May of that year with producer Zeuss. In the summer of 2005 Madball took part in the Sounds of the Underground alongside bands such as Lamb of God and Unearth. On August 1, 2005 their fifth album Legacy was released, the album was met mostly positive reception, Punknews wrote "If you are a true hardcore lover that wants real basic powerful riffs, this album fits your needs. If you are a hardcore enthusiast that searches for more meaning and more complexity in the music, then this album will not fit your needs." The band then did a U.S. tour in support of the album with Walls of Jericho serving as support. They also went on a headlining UK/South America tour which went from October through December.

In 2006 the band took part in multiple tours including a March tour with Zao, a June tour with Leeway along with multiple European festivals and took part in that year’s Persistence Tour. During the Spring of 2007 they began recording for their next album. In August of that year their album Infiltrate the System was released and was met with positive reception. Following a June tour with Terror, Madball then embarked on a lengthy international tour that lasted till the Fall. The band spent 2008 touring heavily including stops in Europe, Australia with Death Before Dishonor, along with a small East coast touring alongside Suicidal Tendencies in December. Also in 2008 the bands drummer Rigg Ross left and was replaced by Mackie Jayson.

To begin 2009, the grouped headlined a West Coast tour of the US. In March of that year Jayson left the band for undisclosed reasons and was replaced by former Throwdown drummer Ben Dussault. In the Spring they toured the US alongside Wisdom in Chains. During the Summer Madball took part in the 10 For $10 tour. A tour that featured nine other hardcore bands such as Poison The Well, Terror and Bane. Later in the year Madball held headlining tours in both Japan and Europe.

Along with bands such as Agnostic Front, Vietnom, Bulldoze, Resistance, H_{2}O and Boston/New York Hip-hop group Special Teamz (Slaine, Ed O.G., Jaysaun, DJ Jayceeoh), they comprise a part of New York's DMS Crew. Vocalist Cricien and bass player Hoya are also in the band Hazen Street, along with members of H_{2}O and Cro-Mags.

=== Empire, Hardcore Lives and For the Cause (2010–2019) ===
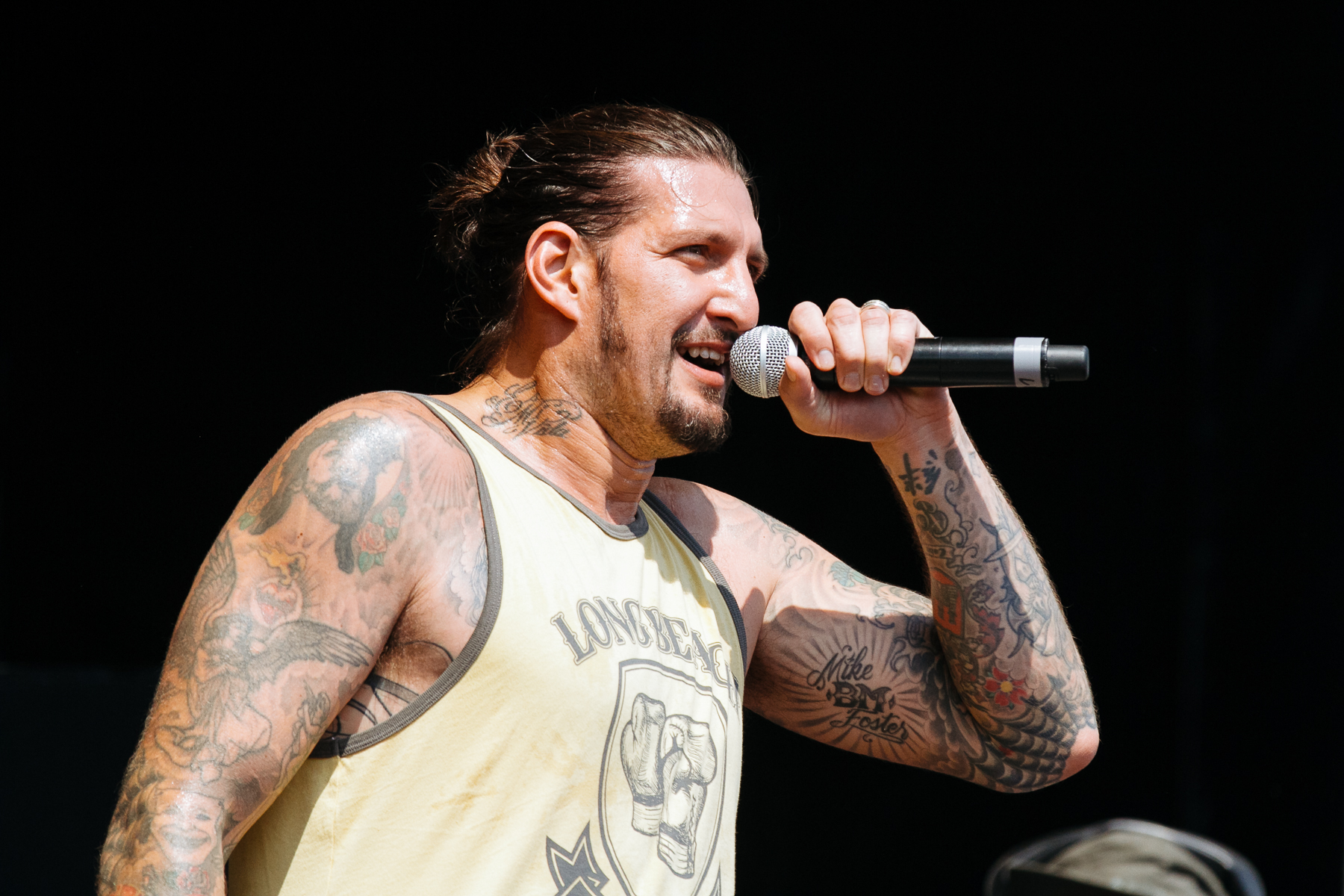
Madball lead singer Freddy Cricien in 2015

In 2010, after the departure of the Ferret Records owners from the label, Madball followed them to their new and present label Good Fight Music. In February 2010 Madball signed a deal with Nuclear Blast for the European release of their new studio album, Empire, produced by Erik Rutan. Jay Weinberg, son of E Street Band and Max Weinberg 7 drummer Max Weinberg, joined Madball for the album and for touring. The album sold 1,500 copies in its first week and debuted at No.15 on the US Heatseekers Charts. Overall it was met with mixed reception. The group took part in the Rebellion Tour. After the tour, Madball then dismissed Weinberg in September 2010, citing personality conflicts. Weinberg said that he had already quit the group by that time, due to lifestyle issues. Born From Pain drummer Igor Wouters replaced Weinberg for live performances including a Canadian tour in September with Comeback Kid and the New York united co headlining tour with Sick of it All. Mike Justian joined the band taking over as their official drummer in 2011. March of that year seen the band tour Europe.

In early 2012 Madball toured with Biohazard along with a European tour with H2O. In March they announced a new EP titled Rebellion which was released later that year. Madball once again took part in that years Rebellion tour, along with their own European headlining tour with Devil in Me serving as support.

In 2013 Madball continued touring extensively playing shows in Europe, South America and the US while also taking part in that years Rebellion tour. They also took part in that years Soundwave in Australia. On March 10, 2014, the band began recording its eighth studio album, Hardcore Lives, which was released in June of that year. The album hit the charts in multiple European countries No. 43 in Germany, 61 in Switzerland, 70 in Austria and 148 in Belgium. The album was met with positive reception with one reviewer stating, "Hardcore Lives is a pounding effort that overcomes repetition." The band took part in the Rebellion tour, held their own UK/Ireland tour while also embarking on a short US tour in celebration of their album Set It Off's 20th anniversary. In December they went on a US tour alongside Turnstile and Take Offense.

In early 2015 Madball went on a European co headlining tour alongside Rise of the Northstar, they also headlined that years Rebellion tour. They took part in the tour again the following along with their own headlining tours, along with joining Limp Bizkit and Korn on a December UK tour. In 2016 Madball took part in the inaugural Florida Metal Fest. Later in the year they held US tours alongside Homewrecker and Power Trip.

In September 2017 Madball played at the East Coast Tsunami fest, they also played multiple South America shows. In October 2017, Brian "Mitts" Daniels had exited Madball. Cricien later commented on Daniel’s departure stating "I had to let him go during that time because we just came to a point where something had to change."

In January 2018 the band began recording for their next album. On May 1, the first single "Old Fashioned" was released. Madball released their ninth studio album, For the Cause, on June 15, 2018. The album was produced by Rancid frontman Tim Armstrong and features a vocal appearance from him and Ice T. The album also seen the return of Matt Henderson replacing Daniels for recording sessions. That same year the band toured extensively in support of the album and headlined the Persistence tour alongside Hatebreed and Terror. In September and October the group played some headlining shows along with supporting Suicidal Tendencies.

In January 2019, Madball announced that their touring guitarist, Mike Gurnari, would become an official member. The rest of the year seen the band Madball support Hatebreed on their 25th anniversary tour. They also made multiple festival and European appearances.

=== Departure of Jorge "Hoya Roc" Guerra and Not Your Kingdom (2020–present) ===
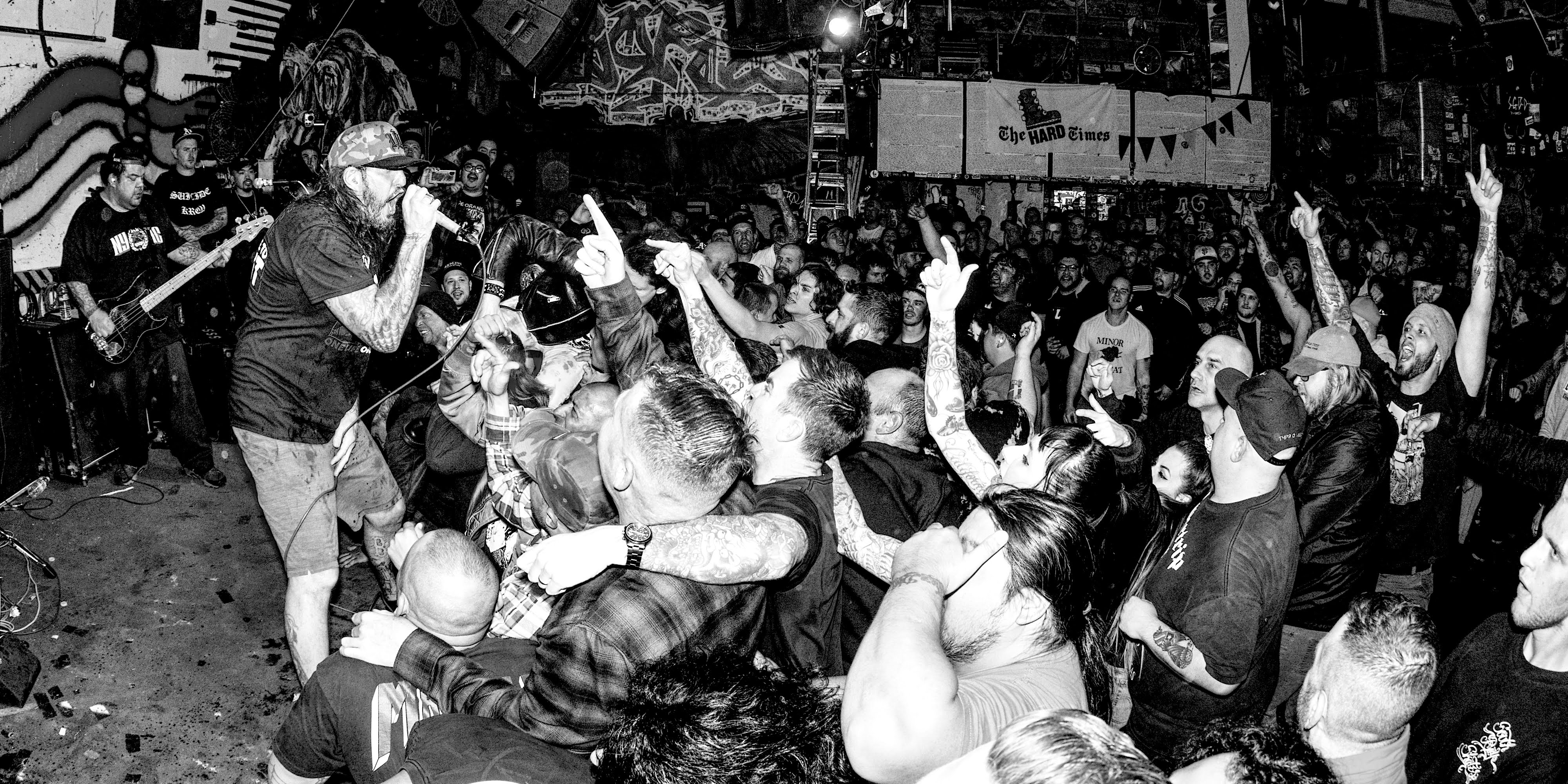
Madball performing in 2020

During the first week of December 2020, Madball collaborated with Jack Daniel's to make a limited edition Single Barrel Select. Each bottle was engraved with the band's logo and came with a specially designed collectors box and Madball guitar pick. On April 24, 2021 Madball headlined a large concert at Tompkins Square Park in New York. From here the band began to tour regularly again including a US headlining tour during the Summer.

In 2022, the band made multiple festival appearances. In the 2023 Madball brought back the Rebellion European Tour touring alongside H20 and others. In August 2023, longtime guitarist Jorge "Hoya Roc" Guerra announced his intention to leave the band. Guerra cited the band's decrease in activity and the resulting financial hardship as his reasons for leaving. He made it known that he would remain with the band through their two upcoming European tours. Following the two tours Guerra officially left the band after 33 years. He was then replaced by Sheer Terror guitarist Brendan Porray. The band continued touring heavily in 2024 making stops in the US and Europe. They toured in early February alongside Scowl and Sunami. They also held a mini tour in celebration of Set It Off 30th Anniversary.

In early 2025 the band headlined that years Rebellion tour across Europe and continued playing multiple dates throughout the year. In October 2025 the band confirmed that they would be releasing a new album in March of 2026, and their first new material in 7 years a single was supposed to be released in November however it was delayed. In March 2026 Madball toured the UK and announced multiple Summer concerts, including co headlining the Superbowl Of Hardcore XI alongside Converge. On March 19, Madball announced on their Facebook page that Paul Delaney of Black Anvil had joined the band as their new bass player, replacing Brendan Porray. On May 14, 2026, the band released their first single in eight years titled "Rebel Kids", they also announced their 10th album Not Your Kingdom would be released on July 24, through Nuclear Blast. Madball went on a short Mexican tour in late May and toured Europe in July and August in support of Not Your Kingdom. The group will also tour Mexico in September, Europe in October with Desolated and Combust and will support Pain of Truth on their North American tour in November.

== Artistry ==
=== Musical style and influence ===
Madball are a hardcore punk band. The band's music put an emphasis on a metal-influenced groove, breakdowns and use of lyrics based on street life, as opposed to the speed of punk rock and the riffing of crossover thrash which were dominate in the genre when they began. This difference led to them helping to define the sound hardcore would take on in the 1990s, as well as the beatdown hardcore genre. They have also been categorised as tough guy hardcore.

Freddy Cricien's lyrical themes center on unity, perseverance, and personal struggle. Madball's Songs frequently advocate for collective strength and living by one's word. He stated in an interview with Vice: "Lyrically speaking, we're realists. We've always just talked about our experiences. Sure there are songs talking about empowerment for the culture and the movement but essentially, especially from Set It Off on, these were stories that were happening in our lives." In a separate interview he added "Our music is honest. And the lyrics are straight forward and to the point. I think that's a big reason why people relate to us everywhere," "What you see is what you get. We're real dudes and we're telling real stories. We have our own brand of this music we call hardcore. When your music is real, and you have your own kind of style, I think that always translates to a certain amount of respect and acknowledgment."

They have cited influences including Sick of It All, Agnostic Front, the Bad Brains, Cro-Mags, Killing Time, Breakdown, Discharge, hip hop music and funk music.

=== Live performances ===
Madball are known for their active touring schedule and since the band's inception in 1988 they played well over 2,000 concerts performing in multiple countries and continents such as the United States, Europe, Japan, Australia and South America. As for the concerts themselves the group are often credited for their high energy performances, authenticity and crowd interactions. Lead singer Freddy Cricien is known to transverse the stage throughout the show, The Aquarian described his stage presence as a tornado and powerhouse of energy.

=== Imagery ===
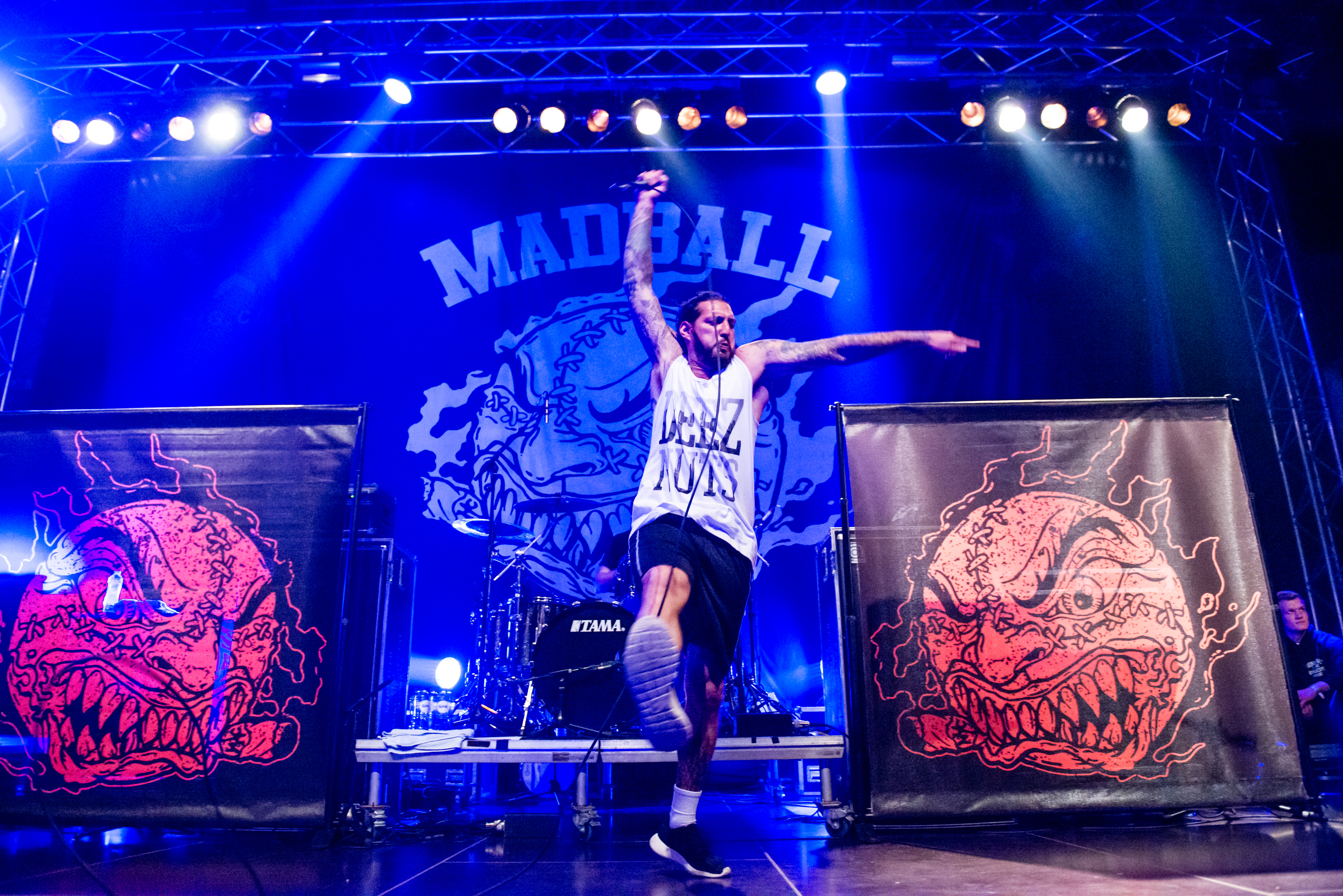
The signature Madball logo can be seen on their banner during live performances

Madball's name comes from a nickname Freddy Cricien was given by Vinnie Stigma when he was around 11-12; in an interview Cricien commented on the name stating:

I was christened "Madball" by Vinnie Stigma. I was losing my shit one day because Roger or one of the guys from the Agnostic Front camp decided to antagonize me. They used to get a kick out of how I reacted to certain things. It was basically some form of child abuse. I will say as I got older they were more fearful of how I'd react… Ha! Anyway, Vinnie starts saying "Madball Madball" cause I was pretty much an angry enraged little ball! He had heard that on a commercial for the toys "Madballs". He just blurted it out and unfortunately or fortunately it stuck. I absolutely hated it, as is the case with nicknames sometimes. Then I just learned to embrace it and the band was formed.

The bands synonymous burning "Ball of Destruction" mascot logo, is reflective of Cricien's youthful rage, energy, and attitude. The Hard Times ranked it the #32 best band logo of all time stating "Madball has the only logo that would work equally well for a double-A baseball team as it would for a New York hardcore band."

== Legacy ==
Madball have been described as "one of the most influential acts of straight-forward modern hardcore." They have also been a stable in the New York Hardcore scene helping pioneer the genre with the likes of Agnostic Front, Sick of It All and Murphy's Law. Their 1994 album Set It Off is viewed as a genre defining hardcore album with Revolver Magazine putting the album on their list of the 10 most essential New York Hardcore albums. MetalSucks has also given the band high praise stating "no band has made a bigger impact on the sound, aesthetic, and overall culture of hardcore than Madball. Without Madball there would be no Terror, no Hatebreed, no Throwdown, no Nails, or any of the other bands who influenced and defined hardcore as we know it today." In addition AllMusic dubbed Madball the architects of the beatdown hardcore sound. They were credited by Riverfront Times as the band that defined tough guy hardcore, and by Stereogum as "an archetypal tough-guy hardcore band". During the 1990s, they became one of the most prominent bands in New York hardcore.

Madball were listed by Alternative Press among the ten most influential bands in hardcore stating "Madball have been one of the introductory bands people discover when learning about the genre's history. Their street-wise lyrics and breakdowns have influenced more than just music, with their endeavors affecting fashion, street art and more." Bands like Trapped Under Ice, Terror, Pain of Truth, 25 ta Life, and Hatebreed have all cited Madball as a influence.

== Band members ==
Madball live at With Full Force 2018

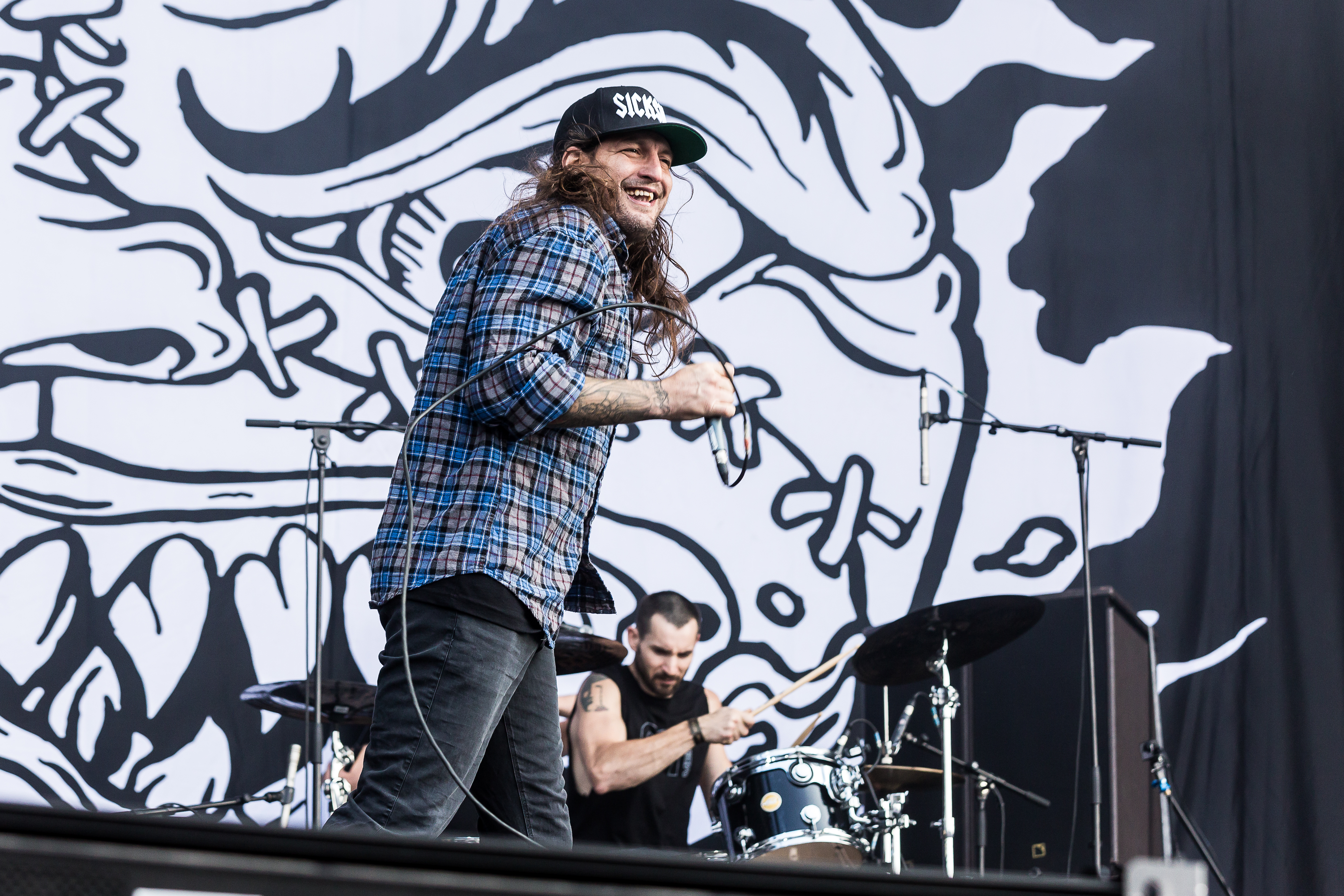
Lead vocalist Freddy Cricien

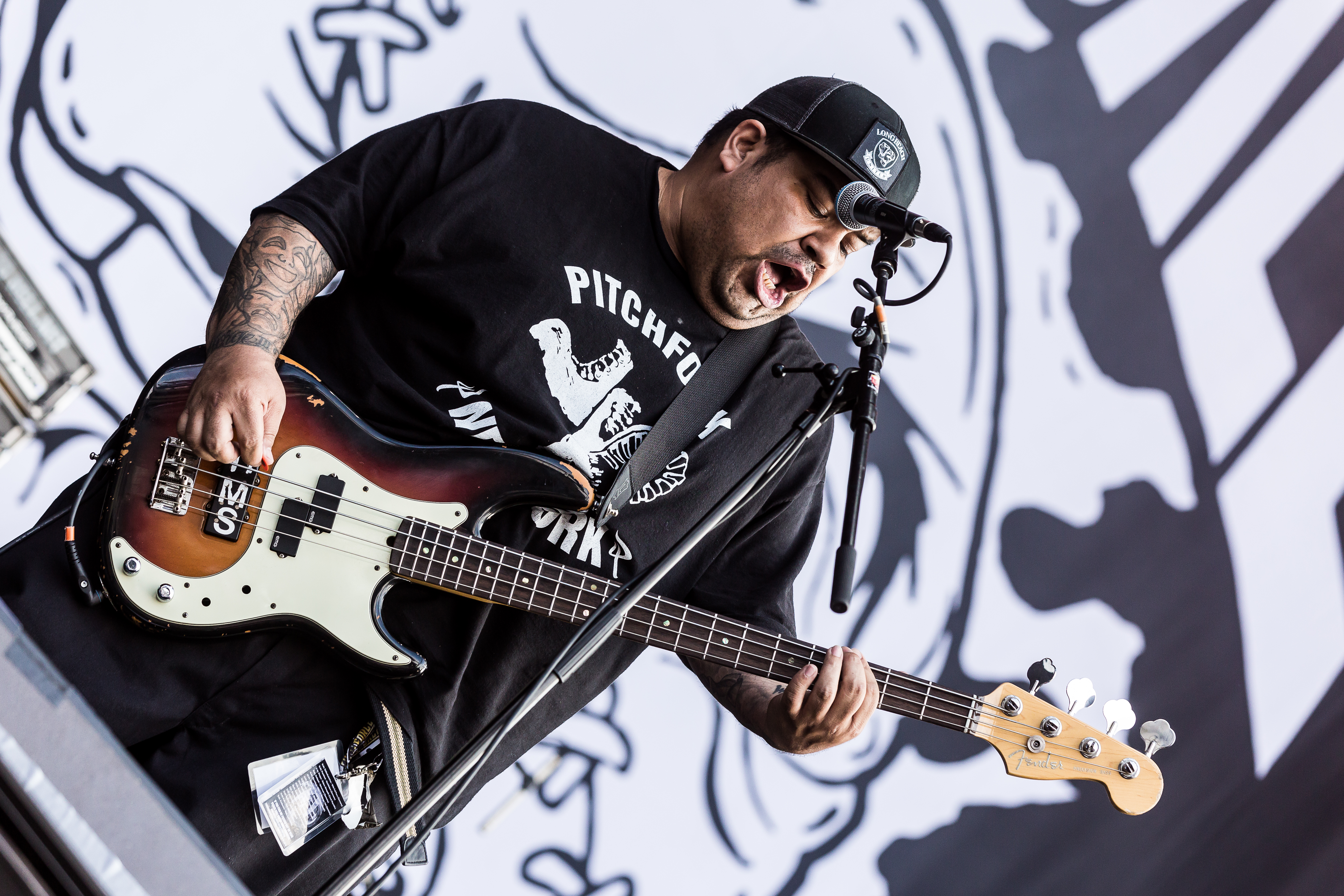
Former bassist Jorge Guerra

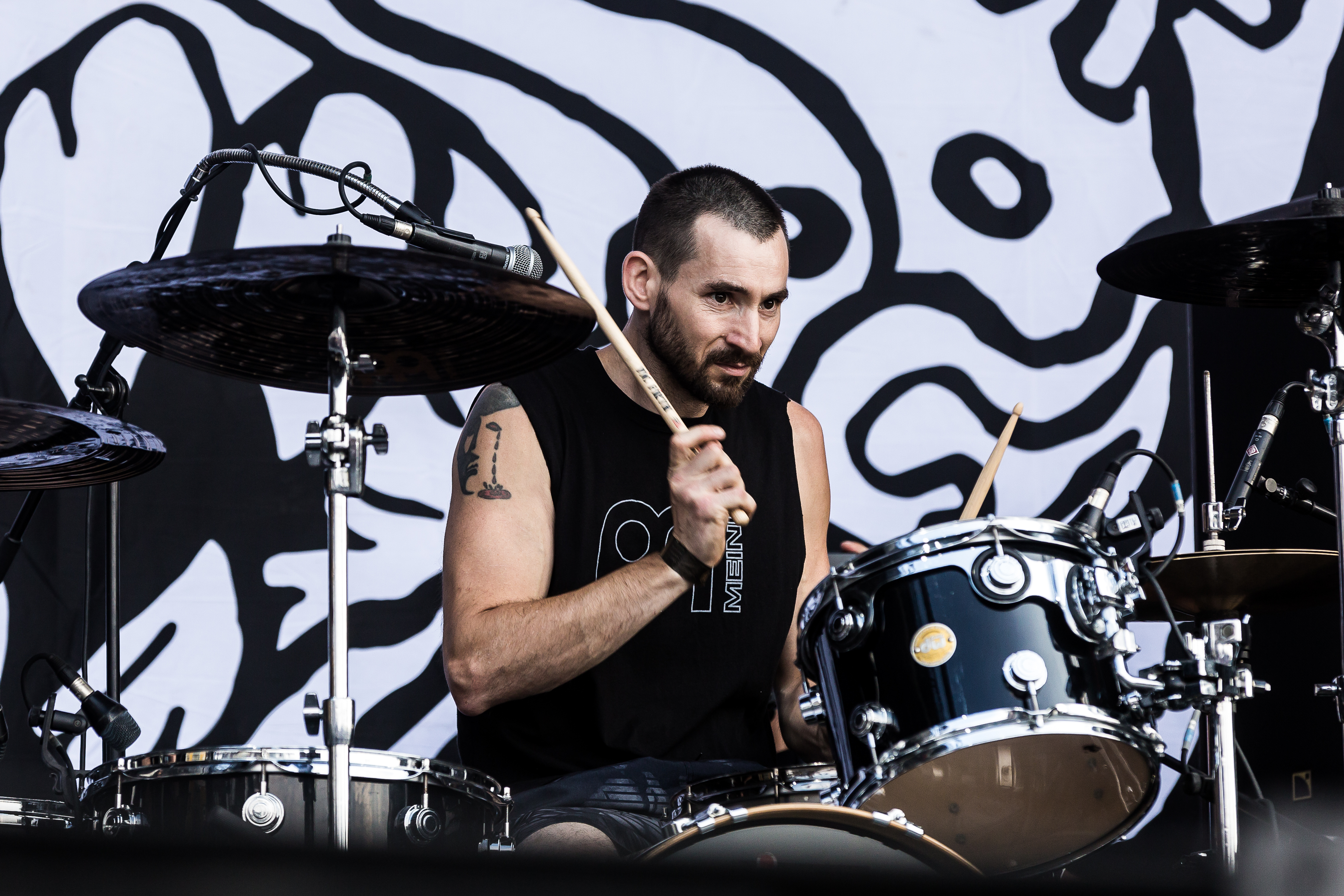
Drummer Mike Justian

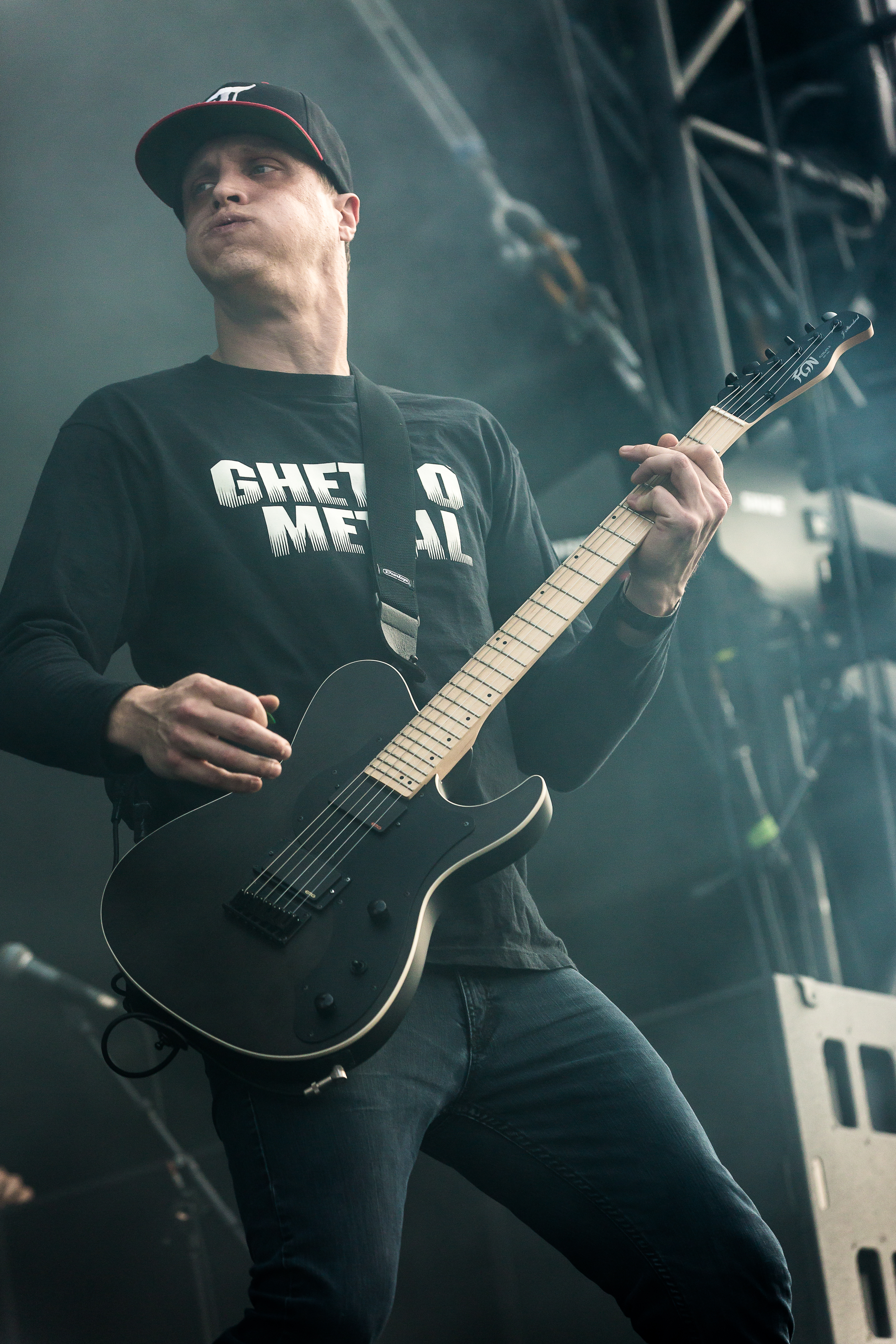
Former guitarist Dominik Stammen

Current members

- Freddy Cricien – lead vocals (1988–2001, 2002–present)
- Mike Justian – drums (2011–present)
- Mike Gurnari – guitars, backing vocals (2018–present)
- Paul Delaney – bass, backing vocals (2026–present)

Former touring musicians

- Walter Ryan – drums (1996–1998)
- Mackie Jayson – drums (2008–2009)
- Ben Dussault – drums (2009)
- Igor Wouters – drums (2010–2011)
- Dominik Stammen – guitars (2018)
- Pete Goerlitz – bass, backing vocals (2023-2026)

Former members

- Roger Miret – bass (1988–1993)
- Vinnie Stigma – guitars (1988–1997)
- Will Shepler – drums (1988–1997; one-off performance 2023)
- Matt Henderson – guitars (1992–2000; session 2018; one-off performance 2023)
- Jorge "Hoya Roc" Guerra – bass, backing vocals (1993–2001, 2002–2023)
- John Lafata – drums (1997–2000, 2001–2002)
- Rob Rosario – guitars (2000–2001)
- Darren Morgenthaler – drums (2000–2001)
- Brian "Mitts" Daniels – guitars (2001, 2002–2017)
- Rigg Ross – drums (2002–2008)
- Jay Weinberg – drums (2010)
- Brendan Porray – bass, backing vocals (2023–2026)

== Discography ==
Studio albums

- Set It Off (1994)
- Demonstrating My Style (1996)
- Look My Way (1998)
- Hold It Down (2000)
- Legacy (2005)
- Infiltrate the System (2007)
- Empire (2010)
- Hardcore Lives (2014)
- For the Cause (2018)
- Not Your Kingdom (2026)

EPs

- Ball of Destruction (1989)
- Droppin' Many Suckers (1992)
- N.Y.H.C. EP (2004)
- Rebellion (2012)

Compilations

- The Best of Madball (2003)

== Music videos ==
- "Down By Law" (1994)
- "Pride (Times Are Changing) (1996)
- "HeavenHell" (2005)
- "Infiltrate the System” (2007)
- "All or Nothing" (2010)
- "Doc Marten Stomp" (2014)
- "DNA" (2014)
- "Born Strong" (2014)
- "Rev Up" (2018)
- "Freight Train" (2018)
- "Old Fashioned" (2018)
- "The Fog” (2018)
- "Rebel Kids" (2026)
- "Tethered" (2026)

== Awards and nominations ==
Metal Storm Awards
Year	Nominee / work	Award	Result
2010	Empire	The Best Hardcore / Metalcore / Deathcore Album	Nominated

Decibel Hall of Fame
Year	Nominee / work	Award	Result
2019	Set It Off	Decibel Hall of Fame	Inducted
