= Look My Way (Madball album) =

Studio album by Madball
- Released: June 9, 1998
- Genre: Hardcore punk
- Length: 26:56
- Label: Roadrunner

Madball chronology
Demonstrating My Style (1996)	Look My Way (1998)	Hold It Down (2000)

Professional ratings
Review scores
Source	Rating
Allmusic	link

Look My Way is the third studio album by New York City hardcore punk band Madball.

== Track listing ==
No.	Title	Length
1.	"Look My Way"	2:48
2.	"Moment Of Truth"	1:38
3.	"Cut Off"	2:37
4.	"Temptation Or Restraint"	1:20
5.	"Waste Of Time"	3:04
6.	"False Threats"	2:14
7.	"Pushin' Me"	2:07
8.	"Walk Away"	0:56
9.	"Our Family"	2:12
10.	"Lesson Of Life"	3:19
11.	"All I Can Take"	2:01
12.	"Been There, Done That"	2:31
