= Hold It Down (Madball album) =

Studio album by Madball
- Released: June 20, 2000
- Studios: Big Blue Meanie, Jersey City, New Jersey
- Genre: Hardcore punk
- Length: 26:45
- Label: Epitaph
- Producer: Matt Henderson

Madball chronology
Look My Way (1998)	Hold It Down (2000)	Best Of Madball (2003)

Hold It Down is an album by the American band Madball, released in 2000.

== Background ==
Hold It Down was Madball’s first release on Epitaph Records. Their three previous albums were all released on Roadrunner Records, lead singer Freddy Cricien stated the band had left Roadrunner due to not getting much attention and that Roadrunner wanted to "focus on newer trends."

It was the first album to feature guitarist Rob Rosario (ex-25 Ta Life) and new drummer Darren Morgenthaller. The album was produced by their former guitarist Matt Henderson.

With this album Madball started to get exposed to a larger punk rock audience. However they did not get to fully capitalize on the momentum due to Cricien getting charged with attempted criminal possession of a weapon and was sentenced to six months in prison shortly after the album’s release. They then only played a handful of shows in support of the album before breaking up in March of 2001.

In celebration of the albums 20th anniversary in 2020, it was re mastered by Tue Madsen and re released on vinyl and CD with a more polished sound and featured a bonus track "Golden Cross."

== Song meanings ==
In a 2020 interview with Ox-Fanzine Freddy Cricien went over the meaning of every song of the album.

"Can’t stop won’t stop" is the bands anthem about touring and their lifestyle. The title track "Hold it Down" is the bands message to the older and the newer generations of hardcore fans that they were gonna hold the hardcore genre down. "Fall This Time" was originally about a group of Cricien’s friends that had gone "overboard with partying and drug use." However as he was writing the song turned into a reflection of Cricien’s own lifestyle at the time. "Everyday Hate" is about fakers in the hardcore scene.

The song "Done" is about breaking up with someone you have been with for a long time. "Say What" focuses on ignorant people who talk bad on others and pass judgement without truly knowing what’s going on. "Show No Fear" touches upon the transition from a scared child to a strong man or woman. "Never Look Back" was another song about a relationship Cricien went through and how music helped him get through it. "Still Searching" was a personal song about Cricien as he was trying to find what he would become. "Confessions" is about an "unpleasant" person from Cricien’s past, "Thinking To Myself" is another reflection on Cricien’s personal life. Finally the closing track "Semper Fi" is about loyalty.

== Critical reception ==
Professional ratings
Review scores
Source	Rating
AllMusic	4/5 stars
Ox-Fanzine	4/5 stars
PunkNews	4/5 stars
Lollipop Magazine	Positive

The Courier News wrote that the album "is as loud, fast and hard as ever, but the 11-year-old band also is writing songs better with more emphasis on strong lyrics and melodies."

Jason Anderson of AllMusic gave the album a 4/5 stating "The caustic vocal approach of Freddy Cricien remained constant and threatening, especially with his updated urban inflections, and of course the music remained brutal, if just a little slower. On Hold It Down, the shorter-than-average song lengths maintain a little old-school tradition, but some '80s NY hardcore purists will definitely consider this a plodding effort."

== Track listing ==
No.	Title	Length
1.	"Intro"	0:50
2.	"Can't Stop, Won't Stop"	1:01
3.	"Hold It Down"	2:19
4.	"Fall This Time"	2:28
5.	"Everyday Hate"	1:16
6.	"Done..."	1:38
7.	"Say What?"	1:50
8.	"D.I.F.M.M"	0:39
9.	"Show No Fear"	2:35
10.	"Never Look Back"	1:46
11.	"Still Searching"	2:13
12.	"Confessions"	1:45
13.	"Thinking to Myself"	3:39
14.	"Semper Fi"	2:47
Total length:		26:45

== Personnel ==
- Bass – Hoya Roc
- Design Concept [Cover Concept] – Madball
- Drums – Darren Morgenthaler
- Executive producer – Roger Miret
- Guitar – Rob Rosario
- Guitar [additional] – Matt Henderson
- Mastered by Tim Gilles
- Mixed by Dan Iannuzzelli
- Other [Interlude Beats] – LDee (tracks: 13, 14)
- Photography by Dario Franco, Tom Aldi
- Photography Artwork [Art], Layout – Joe Darone
- Producer – Matt Henderson
- Recorded by Jason Kanter
- Recorded by (assistant) – Erin Farley
- Vocals – Freddy Cricien
