= I Scream Records =

Belgian independent record label

- Founded: 1994
- Founder: Laurens Kusters
- Distributor(s): ADA (North America) / ADA Global (rest of the world excluding Japan); Avex Group (Japan)
- Genre: Punk, Hardcore, Metal
- Country of origin: Belgium
- Official website: iscreamrecords.com

I Scream Records is an independent record label founded by Laurens Kusters in 1994 in Brussels, Belgium. The label has an extensive catalogue and is one of the leading punk and hardcore labels in Western Europe.

== History ==
The label's first release was from the band Deviate, a band in which Laurens Kusters played the drums. By the late nineties, I Scream Records had over 25 active bands.

In late 2005, I Scream Records opened its US headquarters to work its rosters of bands (90% of which are American) through its own network. Previously, the label's masters were issued under license in the USA by companies such as Victory Records, Bridge 9 Records and Thorp Records.

In 2008 I Scream Records teamed up with ADA for an exclusive North American distribution deal and extended that deal with ADA Global for the rest of the world in 2009. That same year the label also signed a worldwide co-publishing deal with EMI Publishing for its copyrights.

I Scream is currently being distributed by Avex Group in Japan since April 2010, with the first offering being Incite's new album The slaughter.

== Complete roster ==
- Agnostic Front
- Blood for Blood
- Death by Stereo
- Disciple
- Hardsell
- Life of Agony
- Madball
- MOD
- No Trigger
- Skarhead
- Tying Tiffany
- Wisdom in Chains
