= Set It Off (Madball album) =

Studio album by Madball
- Released: 1994
- Genre: Hardcore punk
- Length: 26:34
- Label: Roadrunner
- Producer: Jamie Locke

Madball chronology
Droppin' Many Suckers (1992)	Set It Off (1994)	Demonstrating My Style (1996)

Professional ratings
Review scores
Source	Rating
Allmusic	4/5 stars

Set It Off is the first full-length studio album from New York hardcore band Madball, released in 1994 via Roadrunner Records. It was the first record to feature longtime member Jorge "Hoya Roc" Guerra on bass following the departure of Roger Miret. Critics have called the album an important record for the hardcore genre.

== History ==
The album was recorded in both Boston and Gloucester Massachusetts. An official music video was produced for "Down by Law".

The album lyrics touch upon street life and stories from the band members lives in a 2014 interview lead singer Freddy Cricien stated:

Lyrically speaking, we’re realists. We’ve always just talked about our experiences. Sure there are songs talking about empowerment for the culture and the movement but essentially, especially from Set It Off on, these were stories that were happening in our lives. When we talked about our friends who spent 20+ years in prison, there were definitely always positive messages in there, or at least I tried to reach a positive point.

Jason Anderson of AllMusic claimed the album "is a document of this hardcore outfit at their most menacing, both musically and lyrically", adding "these NY hardcore specialists made a huge sound that was undeniably loud, rude, and confrontational".

In 2019, the album was inducted into the Decibel Hall of Fame. Shawn Macomber, writing for Decibel, dubbed it "one of the single greatest, most enduring hardcore records of all time".

In 2021 Revolver Magazine put the album on their list of the 10 most essential New York Hardcore albums. They stated that the album is a “bouncier, more groove-oriented type of hardcore that ushered in a new era of heaviness.”

Fred Pessaro of Vice stated “Set it Off definitely cements a style and a period in New York hardcore.” Adding “it’s a milestone of the era, you can’t talk about nineties and not mention the record as far as I’m concerned.”

Scott Vogel, vocalist of Terror, dubbed Set It Off as one of the most influential hardcore albums, stating: "Every song has musical power and lyrics that make you feel their pain. This was a strong street-level approach to hardcore that many kids related to whether they were in NYC or a small town in the middle of America."

The band toured in support of the albums 20th anniversary in 2014, and its 30th anniversary in 2024.

== Track listing ==
No.	Title	Length
1.	"Set It Off"	3:27
2.	"Lockdown"	1:46
3.	"New York City"	2:02
4.	"Never Had It"	0:58
5.	"It’s Time"	2:16
6.	"C.T.Y.C. (R.I.P.)"	2:10
7.	"Across Your Face"	1:11
8.	"Down By Law"	2:50
9.	"Spit on Your Grave"	1:50
10.	"Face to Face"	1:54
11.	"Smell the Bacon (What’s with You?)"	0:48
12.	"Get Out"	0:55
13.	"The World Is Mine"	3:03
14.	"Friend or Foe"	1:37
Total length:		26:34

== Credits ==
=== Madball ===
- Freddy Cricien – vocals
- Hoya Roc – bass
- Vinnie Stigma – guitar
- Matt Henderson — guitar and additional vocals
- Will Shepler – drums

=== Personal ===
- Jamie Locke — producer
- Chris Gehringer — mastering
- Jeff Bluestein, Matt Henderson — engineer
