= Wisdom in Chains =

American hardcore punk band

- Wisdom in Chains live 2026

Background information
- Origin: Stroudsburg, Pennsylvania, U.S.
- Genres: Hardcore punk, punk rock, alternative metal, oi!
- Years active: 2002–present
- Label: I Scream

Wisdom in Chains is an American hardcore punk band based out of Northeastern Pennsylvania. The band's name is taken from the lyrics of a song by the New York hardcore band Killing Time. "Wisdom", from Killing Time's 1989 debut album, Brightside, opens with, "Wisdom in chains, unlocked too late".

== Biography ==
Originally, Wisdom in Chains started as an international collaboration between members of Daredevil in the Netherlands and members of Krutch in the United States. Maarten, guitarist of Daredevil (Dutch hardcore band), contacted Mad Joe Black and Richie Krutch, who were both in Krutch at the time, about forming a hardcore band with heavy punk and oi! influences. In September 2001 Maarten came to the U.S. for a recording session with Mad Joe, Richie, and Shawn (drummer for Krutch). The tracks recorded during this session were eventually released in 2003 on GSR as the band's self-titled debut.

After Out To Win/Mushmouth disbanded, Richie and Mad Joe decided to restart Wisdom in Chains and, after receiving Maarten's blessing for the project, recruited a new American line-up. Apart from Richie and Mad Joe, the new line-up included Tony Meltdown from The Ninth Plague on guitar, Shannon from Out To Win/Mushmouth on drums, and Greg "Big Show", a local Stroudsburg musician, on bass. With this line up they would record their first official full length "Die Young". This lineup remained stable for the band's next several full length and minor releases. During this period the band began to develop its sound by incorporating various metal, crossover, and hard rock elements into its songs. After the completion of "Everything You Know" longtime member Tony Meltdown left the band for personal reasons. Soon after the release of the "Pocono Ghosts" 7", longtime member Greg "Big Show" also left the band due to an injury. They were replaced by Evan, from Mad Joe's old band Feeble, on bass and Mav, from Richie's old band Krutch, on guitar.

As of 2015, three members of the band are straight edge.

In July 2024, it was announced that Mad Joe had been asked to leave the band and that former Death Before Dishonor bassist Frankie Puopolo would be the band's new lead vocalist. Guitarist and last remaining founding member Richie Krutch stated in an interview with No Echo that the decision was made due Mad Joe's availability and potential voice problems. In the same interview, Krutch stated that the band had begun writing new material with Puopolo. In June 2025, the band debuted its first new recording with Puopolo, "Mindset," from the band's upcoming split EP with Evergreen Terrace. The split was released on August 29, 2025 through Dead Serious Recordings.

== Current members ==
- Frankie Puopolo — vocals (2024-present)
- Richie Krutch — guitar, backing vocals (2001-present)
- Evan 'Boy' One — bass, backing vocals (2008-present)
- Mav — guitar
- Luke Rota — drums (2014-present)

== Past members ==
- Mad Joe Black - vocals (2001-2024)
- Maarten – guitar (2001-2003)
- Tony Meltdown – guitar, backing vocals (2003-2008)
- Shawn – drums
- Roel – drums
- Harry – bass (2001-2003)
- Greg "Big Show" – bass, backing vocals (2003-2008)
- Shannon Sparky – drums (2003-2008)

== Discography ==
=== Studio albums ===
Year	Album	Label
2003	Wisdom in Chains	Gangstyle
2005	Die Young	Spook City
2007	Class War	Eulogy
2009	Everything You Know	I Scream Records
2012	The Missing Links	I Scream Records
2015	The God Rhythm	Fast Break! Records
2018	Nothing In Nature Respects Weakness	Fast Break! Records
2026	The Gospel	Fast Break! Records

=== Extended plays ===
Year	Album	Label
2006	Vigilante Saint	A389
2011	Pocono Ghosts	Reaper Records

=== Split EPs ===
Year	Album	Label
2007	Split with Injury Time	Rucktion
2025	Split with Evergreen	Dead Serious Recordings

== Videography ==
Year	Name	Label
2007	Die for Us DVD § Universal Warning Records	See below.

§ Die for Us DVD contains live material (14 songs) recorded at show from May 2006 at Backstage Enterprises in Kingston, Pennsylvania, interview with Mad Joe Black and a three-song recording from live performance at the First Unitarian Church in Philadelphia.
