= Brian Daniels (musician) =

American musician

Brian "Mitts" Daniels
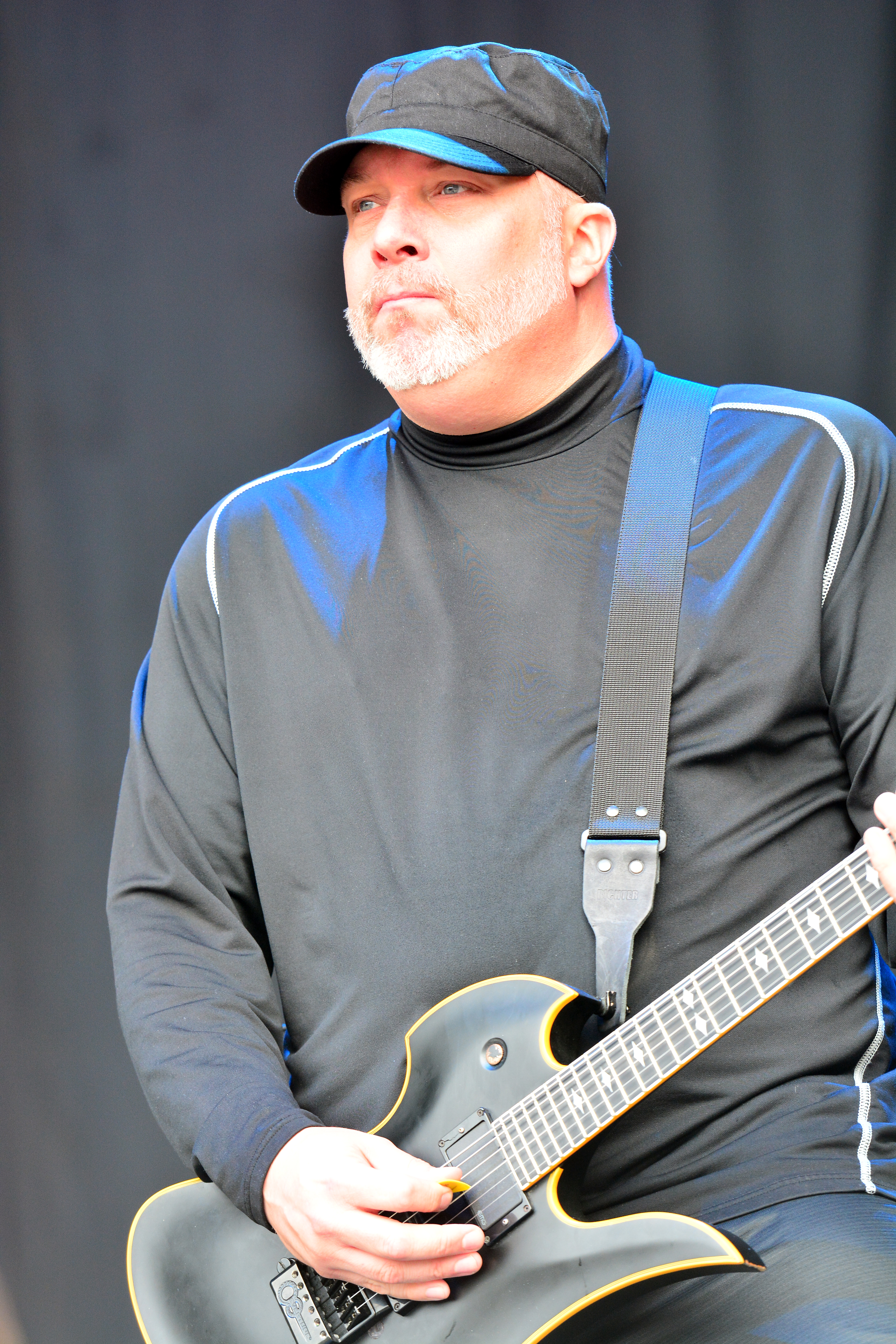
- Daniels in 2015

Background information
- Born: 1971
- Origin: New York City
- Genres: Hardcore punk, crossover thrash, heavy metal
- Occupation(s): Musician, guitarist, songwriter, producer
- Instrument: Guitar
- Years active: 1997–present

Brian "Mitts" Daniels (born 1971) is an American musician, songwriter, and producer. He was the guitarist of Madball from 2001–2017.

== Biography ==
Born in 1971, Daniels first discovered hardcore music during the mid to late '80s in New York. In addition to playing in bands, Daniels served as general assistant/assistant engineer at Skyline Studios in New York City from 1991-1994, before playing guitar in such hardcore-metal bands as Crown of Thornz and Skarhead.

Daniels was the guitarist for Madball from 2001 to 2017, playing on such releases as NYHC EP (2003), Legacy (2005), Infiltrate The System (2007), Empire (2010), Rebellion EP (2012), and Hardcore Lives (2014).

Additionally, Daniels has either recorded or performed with other bands, including Hazen Street and Rag Men, and is also a producer, having produced bands such as Sub Zero, Strength Approach, All For Nothing, Skull Pit, Eternal Struggle.

Since 2014, Daniels has been endorsed by BC Rich guitars.

In October 2017, it was announced that Daniels had exited Madball. The split was amicable, as Madball singer Freddy Cricien explained in an interview with Germany's Metal-heads.de site, "Mitts is an old friend and I love him dearly and he's still my friend. We're still very dear friends."

In 2018, Daniels produced the Israeli hardcore band Eternal Struggle on their debut, Year of the Gun, to be released winter 2021 on Demons Run Amok Entertainment.

In an interview with the No Echo website, Daniels discussed what he seeks to accomplish as a producer: "My goal is to bring out the best qualities of a band. I want every project I work on to be the best recording that band has released, to date."

In November of 2020, Daniels announced he was participating in a project called Dark Time Collaboration, with members of Entombed AD, Unearth, Turbid North, Eternal Struggle.

In November of 2024, Daniels went to Tel Aviv to produce the sophomore release for Eternal Struggle.

== Discography ==
- 1998: Skarhead Kings at Crime - Victory Records (guitar)
- 1999: Various Artists/Skarhead Built for Speed: A Motörhead Tribute - Victory Records (guitar)
- 2000: Skarhead Victory Records: New York City Takeover, Volume 2 - Victory Records (guitar)
- 2000: Skarhead Dirty Money Syndicate demo (guitar)
- 2003: Sub Zero Necropolis: City of the Damned - Stillborn Records (guitar)
- 2003: Rag Men Rag Men - Eulogy Records (guitar)
- 2003: Madball NYHC EP - Thorp Records (guitar)
- 2005: Madball Legacy - Ferret Music (guitar)
- 2007: Madball Infiltrate the System - Ferret Music (guitar)
- 2010: Madball Empire - Nuclear Blast (guitar)
- 2012: Madball Rebellion EP - The BNB Label (guitar)
- 2013: Strength Approach Roma Hardcore State of Mind EP - Destroy Your World Records (producer)
- 2014: Madball Hardcore Lives - Nuclear Blast (guitar)
- 2016: Strength Approach Over The Edge - Fast Break Records (producer)
- 2017: All for Nothing Minds Awake / Hearts Alive - Redfield Records (producer)
- 2018: Skull Pit Skull Pit - Metal Blade Records (producer of vocals)
- 2021: Eternal Struggle Year of the Gun - Demons Run Amok Entertainment (producer)
- 2024: Eternal Struggle - title TBA - label TBA (producer)
