= List of Agnostic Front band members =

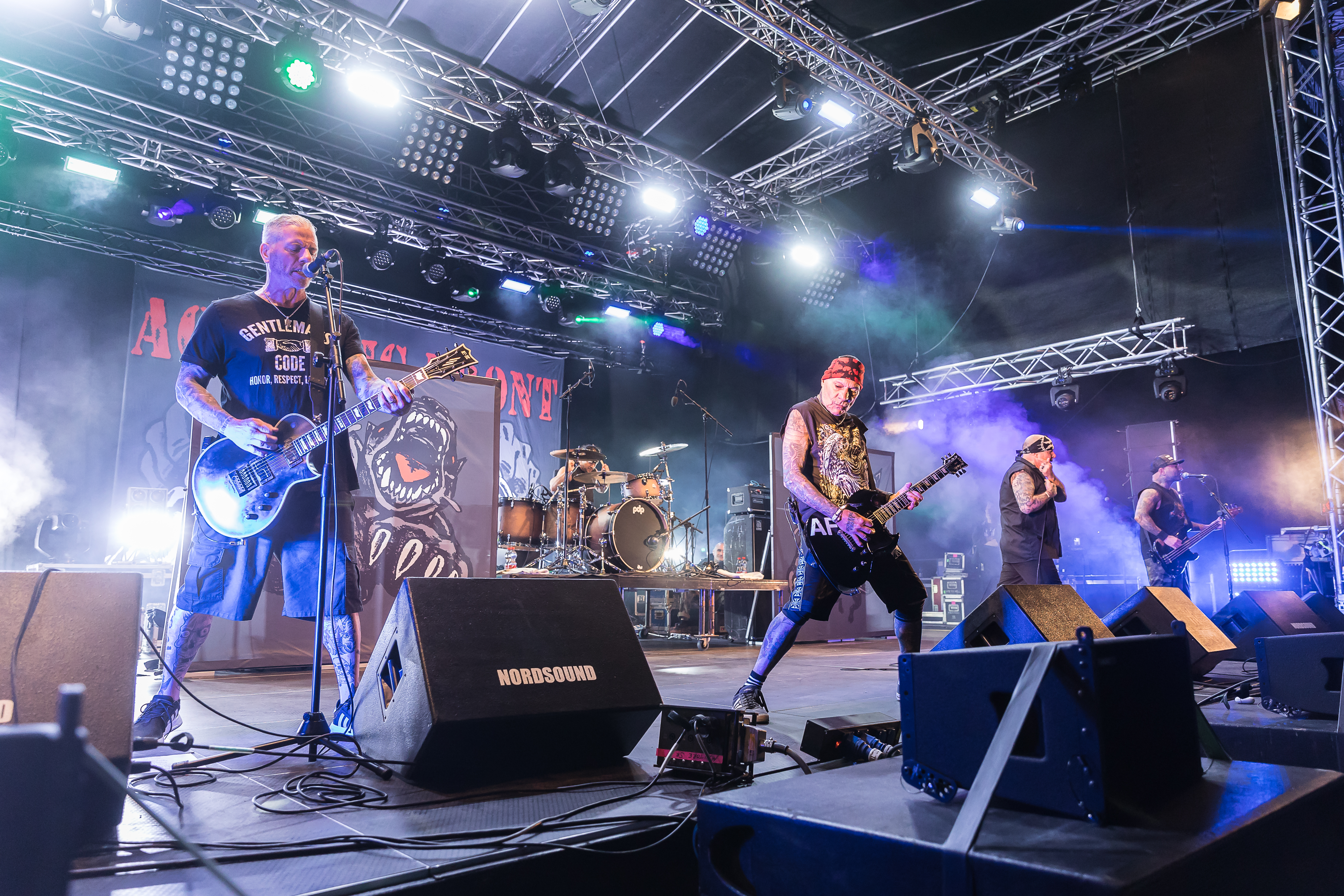
Agnostic Front performing live in 2024

Agnostic Front is an American New York hardcore band. Formed in 1982, the group's original lineup consisted of vocalist John Watson, guitarist Vinnie Stigma, bassist Diego Casalins and drummer Robby Crypt Crash. Stigma is the only remaining original member of the band, which currently also includes vocalist Roger Miret (who first joined in early 1983), bassist Mike Gallo (a member since 2000), guitarist Craig Silverman (since 2014) and drummer Danny Lamagna (since 2022).

== History ==
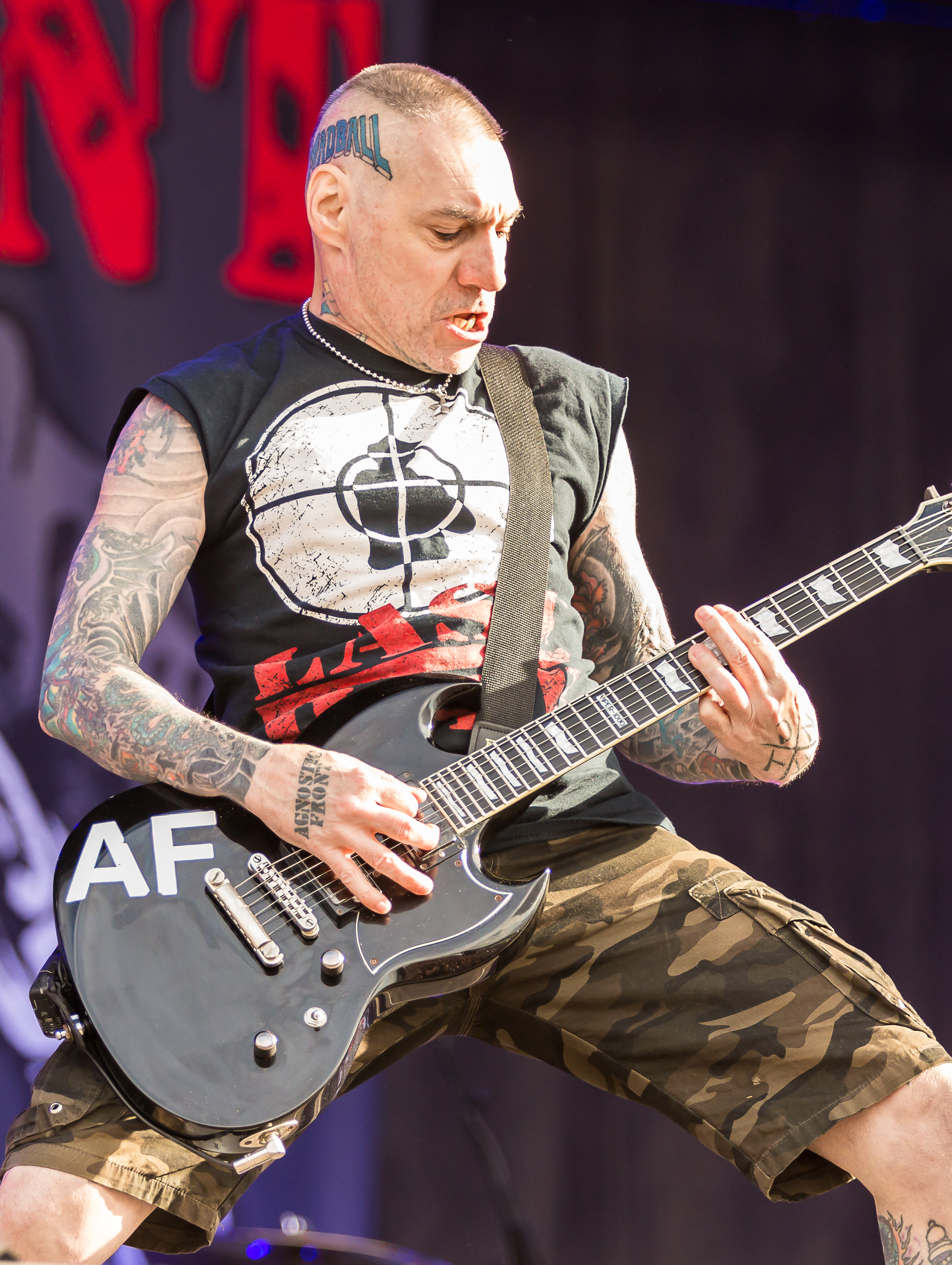
Guitarist Vinnie Stigma formed Agnostic Front in early 1982. Save for a brief hiatus in late-1986, he has been a constant member of the band.

=== 1982–1986 ===
Agnostic Front (AF) was founded in early 1982 by guitarist Vinnie Stigma (Vincenzo Cappuccio). The group's original lineup included John Watson on vocals, Diego Caslins on bass and Robby "Crypt Crash" Krekus on drums. During the band's early months, Krekus was replaced by Ray "Raybeez" Barbieri and Casalins was replaced by Adam Mucci. Watson was briefly replaced by Keith Burkhardt during September/October 1982 after being arrested, but had returned by early November. Before the end of the year, Watson had left again and been replaced by Jimmy "The Russian" Kontra. By April the next year, Roger Miret had taken over as AF frontman. This lineup recorded United Blood in June, before Mucci was replaced by 12-year-old Todd Youth (Schofield). Later that summer, Raybeez left due to problems with drug abuse, with Dave Jones taking his place.

Youth left at the beginning of 1984, replaced in time for the recording of the band's first full-length album Victim in Pain by Rob Kabula. After the album's release, Petey Hines took over on drums for a string of shows and the recording of two tracks for the Urinal Records compilation Message from America: Hardcore Has Come of Age, but was replaced by Jimmy "The Kid" Colletti ahead of a full North American tour starting in early 1985. After finishing the tour in the summer, the band expanded to a five-piece for the first time with the addition of guitarist Alex Kinon. Shortly thereafter, Colletti suddenly quit, with Louie Beato (Beateaux) brought in from Carnivore for the recording of Cause for Alarm, the band's second album. Prior to recording the album, Miret left AF for a few months at the beginning of 1986, during which time Carl "The Mosher" Demola stepped in.

After the first few shows to promote Cause for Alarm, Beato returned to Carnivore and Kinon also left. The pair were replaced by new drummer Joe "Fish" Montanaro and guitarist Gordon Ancis, respectively. After a tour supporting GBH, Vinnie Stigma left AF in the summer of 1986 after clashing with Kabula, with Johnny Sanchez taking his place. The new lineup completed the Cause for Alarm Tour towards the end of the year, before disbanding temporarily in an attempt to oust Montanaro.

=== 1987–1993 ===
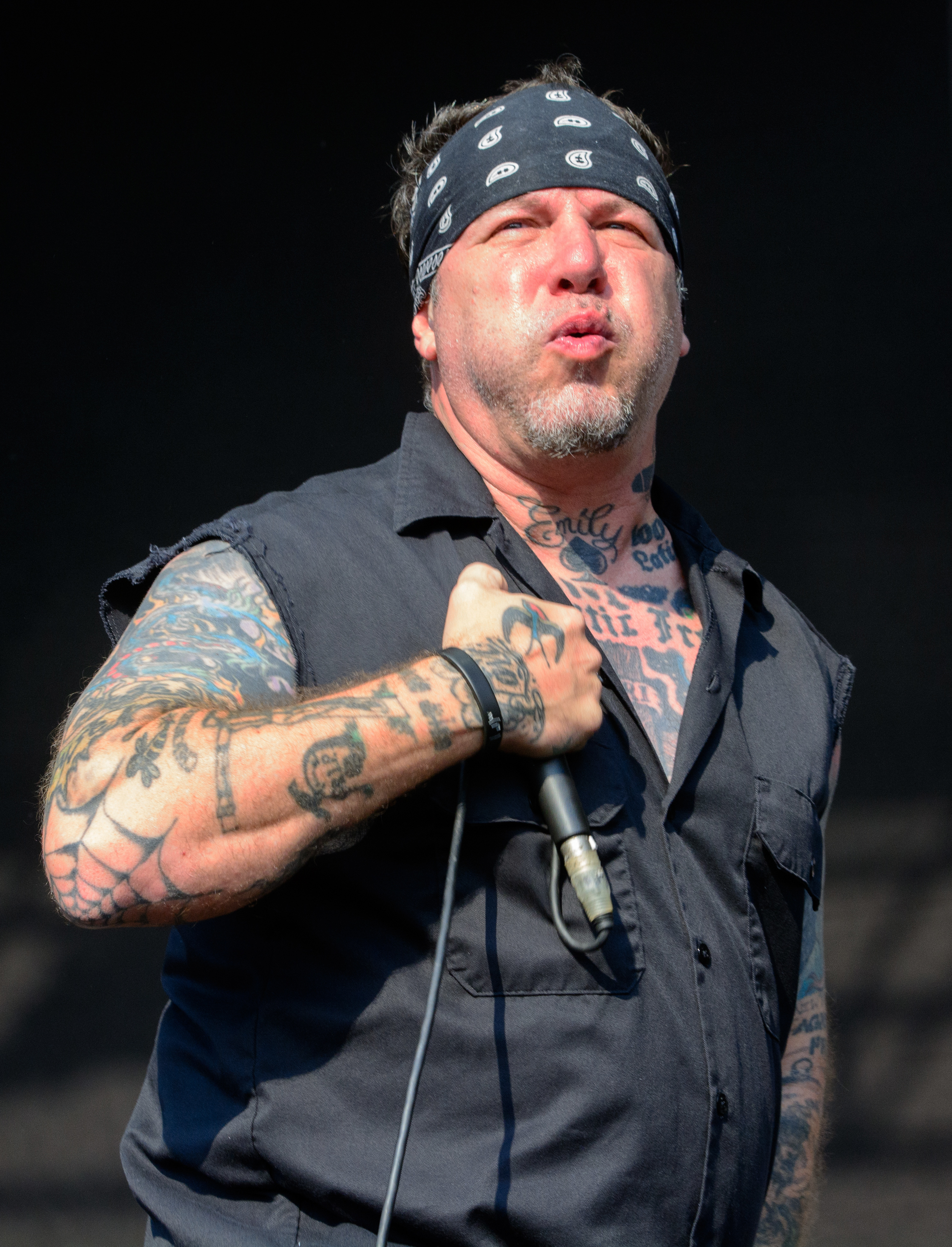
Roger Miret took over as Agnostic Front's vocalist in 1983 and still fronts the band to date.

Roger Miret and Vinnie Stigma formed a new incarnation of AF over the summer of 1987, enlisting lead guitarist Steve Martin, bassist Alan Peters and drummer Will Shepler. After recording Liberty and Justice For..., Peters was replaced by former Youth of Today and Straight Ahead bassist Craig Setari. In January 1989, Miret was sentenced to four years in prison for drug trafficking a couple of years earlier. During this period, Combat Records issued the band's first live album Live at CBGB, which was recorded on tour the previous summer. Miret was released early in September 1990 after the charges were overturned. When the band reconvened, however, Martin announced that he was leaving to work in music publicity; he was replaced in AF by Matt Henderson and the band resumed touring shortly thereafter.

At the beginning of a European tour in October 1990, Miret was refused entry to Belgium as he didn't have a valid visa; the band continued the tour, with roadie Mike Shost stepping in as temporary vocalist. In January 1991, the band performed alongside Sick of It All and Gorilla Biscuits at a show dubbed the "Superbowl of Hardcore IV", which was issued later in the year on the video Live in N.Y.C. '91. Later in the year, the new lineup recorded its first studio album One Voice, which was released in January 1992. During the subsequent touring cycle, Miret was temporarily replaced by his younger brother (and Madball bandmate) Freddy Cricien for a string of shows in July, while he underwent surgery to treat an inguinal hernia. The band's performance at CBGB in December 1992 was released in 1993 as the band's second live album, Last Warning.

AF continued touring in promotion of One Voice until February 1993, after which the group disbanded. According to Miret, "After the [last] show we were totally spent. We were through — and not just with touring." Vinnie Stigma, Matt Henderson and Will Shepler continued performing with Madball for several years.

=== Since 1996 ===
Roger Miret and Vinnie Stigma reformed AF for a string of reunion shows starting in December 1996, bringing back former members Rob Kabula on bass and Jimmy Colletti on drums. This lineup released its comeback album Something's Gotta Give in June 1998, followed by Riot, Riot, Upstart in September 1999.

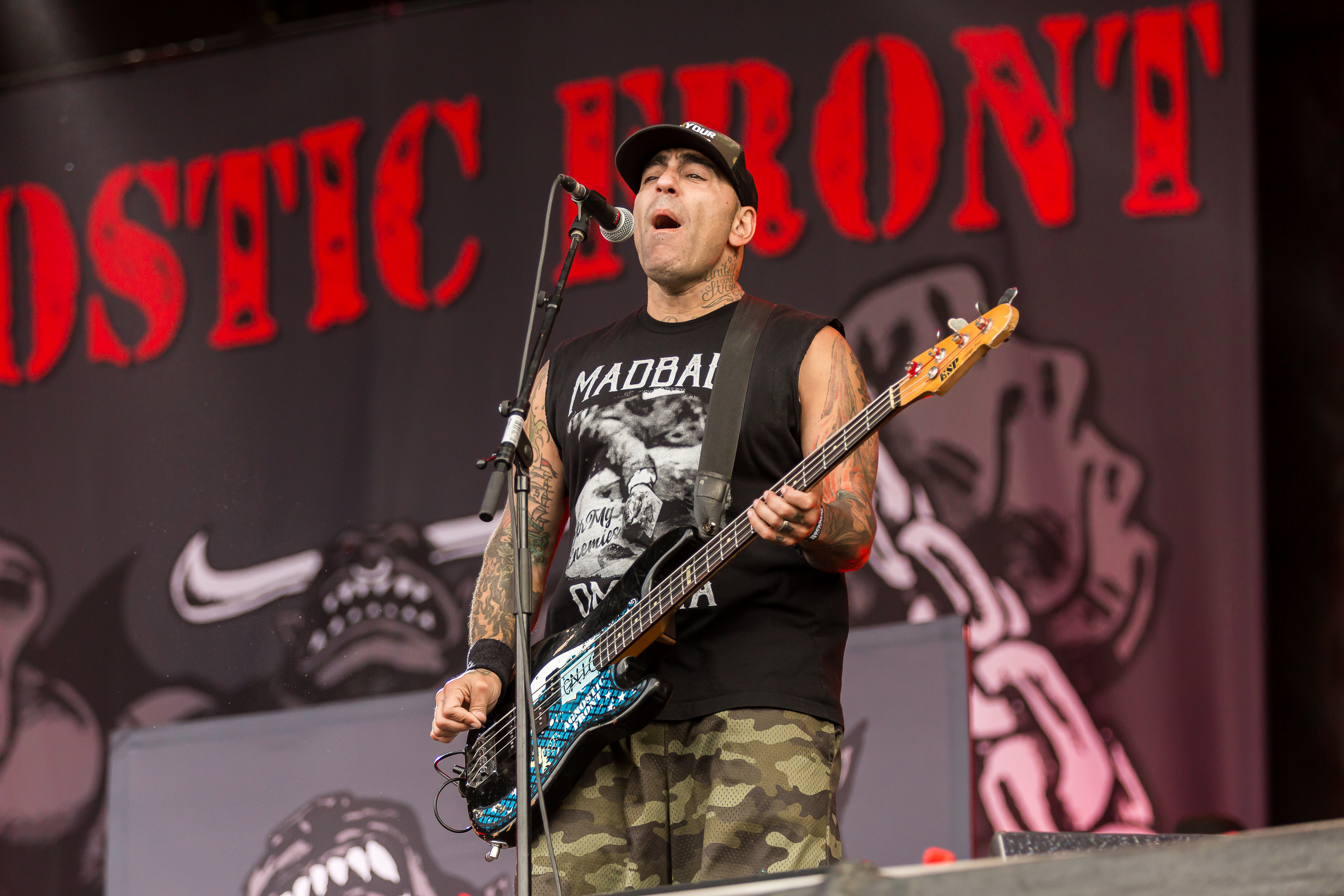
Mike Gallo has been the bassist for Agnostic Front since 2000, replacing Rob Kabula.

After touring until the summer of 2000, AF briefly took a break to start writing material for a new album. During this period, Kabula was replaced by Mike Gallo. The new lineup released its first album Dead Yuppies in September 2001. The following year, the band released its third live album Working Class Heroes, a split with Dutch band Discipline recorded in June 2001. During a European tour in early 2002, Colletti was briefly replaced by former drummer Will Shepler after being shot. Colletti eventually left permanently in early 2004, replaced by Gallo's brother Steve, who had previously played a few tours with the band. Around the same time, the group added Lenny Di Sclafani on second guitar, although he did not perform on the band's next album — instead, Matt Henderson was brought in as a session guitarist.

Another Voice was released on November 22, 2004, by Nuclear Blast Records. Just before the album's release, the band played a show at CBGB which was recorded for a fourth live album, Live at CBGB: 25 Years of Blood, Honor and Truth. By the summer of 2006, Di Sclafani had been replaced by Joseph James. He debuted on Warriors, which was released the following November. In March 2009, Steve Gallo was replaced by former Leeway drummer Jimmy "Pokey" Mo. According to Miret, Gallo "was going through a lot of personal and financial issues and needed more security than [the band] could offer him", after the group scaled back their touring to allow the frontman to spend more time with his family. Pokey Mo's first album as a member of AF was My Life My Way, which was released in March 2011.

In May 2014, James was replaced by Craig Silverman. The new lineup remained stable for over five years, releasing The American Dream Died in April 2015, followed by Get Loud! in November 2019. After a two-year break due to the COVID-19 pandemic and Miret's cancer diagnosis, AF returned to touring in May 2022 with new drummer Danny Lamagna, who had taken over from Mo following his departure in 2020. The new lineup is set to release its first album Echoes in Eternity in November 2025.

== Members ==
=== Current ===
Image	Name	Years active	Instruments	Release contributions
	Vinnie Stigma (Vincenzo Cappuccio)	1982–1986; 1987–1993; 1996–present	lead guitar; backing vocals	all Agnostic Front (AF) releases
	Roger Miret	1983–1986; 1986; 1987–1993; 1996–present	lead vocals	all Agnostic Front (AF) releases
	Mike Gallo	2000–present	bass; backing vocals	all AF releases from Dead Yuppies (2001) onwards
	Craig Silverman	2014–present	rhythm guitar; backing vocals	The American Dream Died (2015); Get Loud! (2019); Echoes in Eternity (2025)
	Danny Lamagna	2022–present	drums	Echoes in Eternity (2025)

=== Former ===
Image	Name	Years active	Instruments	Release contributions
	John Watson	1982 (two spells)	lead vocals	none
	Diego Casalins	1982	bass; backing vocals	none
	Robby Crypt Crash (Rob Krekus)	1982	drums	none
	Ray "Raybeez" Barbieri (1961–1997)	1982–1983	drums	United Blood (1983)
	Adam "Moochie" Mucci	1982–1983	bass	United Blood (1983)
	Keith Burkhardt	1982	lead vocals	none
	Jimmy "The Russian" Kontra	1982–1983	lead vocals	none
	Todd Youth (Todd Schofield; 1970–2018)	1983–1984	bass; backing vocals	none
	Dave Jones	1983–1984	drums	Victim in Pain (1984)
	Rob Kabula	1984–1986; 1996–2000	bass; backing vocals	Victim in Pain (1984); Message from America: Hardcore Has Come of Age (1985); Cause for Alarm (1986); Something's Gotta Give (1998); Riot, Riot, Upstart (1999)
	Petey Hines	1984–1985	drums	Message from America: Hardcore Has Come of Age (1985)
	Jimmy "The Kid" Colletti	1985; 1996–2004	drums; backing vocals	Something's Gotta Give (1998); Riot, Riot, Upstart (1999); Dead Yuppies (2001); Working Class Heroes (2002)
	Alex Kinon	1985–1986	rhythm guitar	Cause for Alarm (1986)
	Louie Beato (Louis Beateaux)	1985–1986	drums	Cause for Alarm (1986)
	Carl Demola	1986	lead vocals	none
	Joe "Fish" Montanaro	1986	drums	none
	Gordon Ancis	1986	rhythm guitar	none
	Johnny Sanchez	1986	lead guitar	none
	Will Shepler	1987–1993; 2002 (stand-in)	drums; backing vocals	Liberty and Justice For... (1987); Live at CBGB (1989); Live in N.Y.C. '91 (1991); One Voice (1992); Last Warning (1993)
	Steve Martin	1987–1990	guitar	Liberty and Justice For... (1987); Live at CBGB (1989)
	Alan Peters (1965–2020)	1987	bass; backing vocals	Liberty and Justice For... (1987)
	Craig "Skully" Setari	1987–1993	bass; backing vocals	Live at CBGB (1989); Live in N.Y.C. '91 (1991); One Voice (1992); Last Warning (1993)
	Matt "Wildcard" Henderson	1990–1993; 2004 (session)	rhythm guitar; backing vocals	Live in N.Y.C. '91 (1991); One Voice (1992); Last Warning (1993)
	Steve Gallo	2003 (stand-in); 2004–2009	drums; backing vocals	Dead Yuppies (2001); Another Voice (2004); Live at CBGB: 25 Years of Blood, Honor and Truth (2006); Warriors (2007)
	Lenny Di Sclafani	2004–2006	rhythm guitar	Live at CBGB: 25 Years of Blood, Honor and Truth (2006)
	Joseph James	2006–2014	rhythm guitar; backing vocals	Warriors (2007); My Life My Way (2011)
	Jimmy "Pokey" Mo	2009–2020	drums	My Life My Way (2011); The American Dream Died (2015); Get Loud! (2019)

=== Stand-in ===
Image	Name	Years active	Instruments	Details
	Mike Shost	1990	lead vocals	Shost performed on a European tour in October/November 1990 due to issues with Miret's visa.
	Freddy Cricien	1992	lead vocals	Cricien temporarily filled in for Miret for a run of shows in July 1992 when he underwent surgery.

== Lineups ==
Period	Members	Releases
Early 1982	Vinnie Stigma — guitars, backing vocals; John Watson — lead vocals; Diego Casalins — bass, backing vocals; Robby Crypt Crash — drums	none
1982	Vinnie Stigma — guitars, backing vocals; John Watson — lead vocals; Diego Casalins — bass, backing vocals; Ray "Raybeez" Barbieri — drums	none
1982	Vinnie Stigma — guitars, backing vocals; John Watson — lead vocals; Ray "Raybeez" Barbieri — drums; Adam Mucci — bass	none
September/October 1982	Vinnie Stigma — guitars, backing vocals; Ray "Raybeez" Barbieri — drums; Adam Mucci — bass; Keith Burkhardt — lead vocals	none
Late 1982	Vinnie Stigma — guitars, backing vocals; Ray "Raybeez" Barbieri — drums; Adam Mucci — bass; John Watson — lead vocals	none
Late 1982–April 1983	Vinnie Stigma — guitars, backing vocals; Ray "Raybeez" Barbieri — drums; Adam Mucci — bass; Jimmy Kontra — lead vocals	none
April–summer 1983	Vinnie Stigma — guitars, backing vocals; Ray "Raybeez" Barbieri — drums; Adam Mucci — bass; Roger Miret — lead vocals	United Blood (1983)
Summer 1983	Vinnie Stigma — guitars, backing vocals; Ray "Raybeez" Barbieri — drums; Roger Miret — lead vocals; Todd Youth — bass, backing vocals	none
Summer 1983–early 1984	Vinnie Stigma — guitars, backing vocals; Roger Miret — lead vocals; Todd Youth — bass, backing vocals; Dave Jones — drums	none
Early–summer 1984	Vinnie Stigma — guitars, backing vocals; Roger Miret — lead vocals; Dave Jones — drums; Rob Kabula — bass, backing vocals	Victim in Pain (1984)
Summer 1984–early 1985	Vinnie Stigma — guitars, backing vocals; Roger Miret — lead vocals; Rob Kabula — bass, backing vocals; Petey Hines — drums	Message from America: Hardcore Has Come of Age (1985) — two tracks
Early–summer 1985	Vinnie Stigma — guitars, backing vocals; Roger Miret — lead vocals; Rob Kabula — bass, backing vocals; Jimmy Colletti — drums, backing vocals	none
Summer 1985	Vinnie Stigma — lead guitar, backing vocals; Roger Miret — lead vocals; Rob Kabula — bass, backing vocals; Jimmy Colletti — drums, backing vocals; Alex Kinon — rhythm guitar	none
Fall 1985–January 1986	Vinnie Stigma — lead guitar, backing vocals; Roger Miret — lead vocals; Rob Kabula — bass, backing vocals; Alex Kinon — rhythm guitar; Louie Beato — drums	none
January–April 1986	Vinnie Stigma — lead guitar, backing vocals; Rob Kabula — bass, backing vocals; Alex Kinon — rhythm guitar; Louie Beato — drums; Carl Demola — lead vocals	none
April–May 1986	Vinnie Stigma — lead guitar, backing vocals; Rob Kabula — bass, backing vocals; Alex Kinon — rhythm guitar; Louie Beato — drums; Roger Miret — lead vocals	Cause for Alarm (1986)
Summer 1986	Vinnie Stigma — lead guitar, backing vocals; Rob Kabula — bass, backing vocals; Roger Miret — lead vocals; Gordon Ancis — rhythm guitar; Joe Montanaro — drums	none
Fall–late 1986	Rob Kabula — bass, backing vocals; Roger Miret — lead vocals; Gordon Ancis — rhythm guitar; Joe Montanaro — drums; Johnny Sanchez — lead guitar, backing vocals	none
Band inactive early–spring 1987
Summer–fall 1987	Roger Miret — lead vocals; Vinnie Stigma — lead guitar, backing vocals; Will Shepler — drums, backing vocals; Steve Martin — rhythm guitar; Alan Peters — bass, backing vocals	Liberty and Justice For... (1987)
Fall 1987–September 1990	Roger Miret — lead vocals; Vinnie Stigma — lead guitar, backing vocals; Will Shepler — drums, backing vocals; Steve Martin — rhythm guitar; Craig Setari — bass, backing vocals	Live at CBGB (1989)
September 1990–February 1993	Roger Miret — lead vocals; Vinnie Stigma — lead guitar, backing vocals; Will Shepler — drums, backing vocals; Craig Setari — bass, backing vocals; Matt Henderson — rhythm guitar, backing vocals	Live in N.Y.C. '91 (1991); One Voice (1992); Last Warning (1993)
Band inactive March 1993–April 1996
Late 1996–summer 2000	Roger Miret — lead vocals; Vinnie Stigma — guitars, backing vocals; Rob Kabula — bass, backing vocals; Jimmy Colletti — drums, backing vocals	Something's Gotta Give (1998); Riot, Riot, Upstart (1999)
Summer 2000–early 2004	Roger Miret — lead vocals; Vinnie Stigma — guitars, backing vocals; Jimmy Colletti — drums, backing vocals; Mike Gallo — bass, backing vocals	Dead Yuppies (2001); Working Class Heroes (2002)
Early 2004–summer 2006	Roger Miret — lead vocals; Vinnie Stigma — lead guitar, backing vocals; Mike Gallo — bass, backing vocals; Steve Gallo — drums, backing vocals; Lenny Di Sclafani — rhythm guitar	Another Voice (2004) — features Matt Henderson in place of Lenny Di Sclafani; Live at CBGB: 25 Years of Blood, Honor and Truth (2006)
Summer 2006–March 2009	Roger Miret — lead vocals; Vinnie Stigma — lead guitar, backing vocals; Mike Gallo — bass, backing vocals; Steve Gallo — drums, backing vocals; Joseph James — rhythm guitar, backing vocals	Warriors (2007)
March 2009–May 2014	Roger Miret — lead vocals; Vinnie Stigma — lead guitar, backing vocals; Mike Gallo — bass, backing vocals; Joseph James — rhythm guitar, backing vocals; Jimmy "Pokey" Mo — drums	My Life My Way (2011)
May 2014–2020	Roger Miret — lead vocals; Vinnie Stigma — lead guitar, backing vocals; Mike Gallo — bass, backing vocals; Jimmy "Pokey" Mo — drums; Craig Silverman — rhythm guitar, backing vocals	The American Dream Died (2015); Get Loud! (2019)
Spring 2022–present	Roger Miret — lead vocals; Vinnie Stigma — lead guitar, backing vocals; Mike Gallo — bass, backing vocals; Craig Silverman — rhythm guitar, backing vocals; Danny Lamagna — drums	Echoes in Eternity (2025)

== Bibliography ==
- Miret, Roger; Wiederhorn, Jon (2017), My Riot: Agnostic Front, Grit, Guts & Glory, New York City, New York: Lesser Gods, ISBN 978-1944713102
