= Last Warning =

The Last Warning or Last Warning may refer to:

- The Last Warning (1928 film), a 1928 American mystery film
- The Last Warning (1938 film), an American mystery film based on 1938 novel
- Last Warning (album), a 1992 compilation album by New York hardcore band Agnostic Front

== See also ==
- Mr. Moto's Last Warning, a 1939 American mystery film, sixth entry in Mr. Moto series
