= My Life My Way =

Studio album by Agnostic Front
- Released: March 22, 2011
- Recorded: November-December 2010
- Studio: Mana Recording Studios in Tampa, Florida
- Genre: Hardcore punk
- Length: 34:09
- Label: Nuclear Blast
- Producer: Freddy Cricien

Agnostic Front chronology
Warriors (2007)	My Life My Way (2011)	The American Dream Died (2015)

My Life My Way is the tenth full-length album by New York hardcore band Agnostic Front. It was released on March 4, 2011, in Europe and March 22, in North America by Nuclear Blast and is the last album to feature guitarist Joseph James.

== Background ==
In November 2010, it was announced Agnostic Front had entered Mana Recording Studios in Tampa, Florida to record their tenth studio album with Erik Rutan. It is the bands second straight album to be produced by lead singer Roger Miret’s half brother Freddy Cricien. On November 23, while on the RealPunkRadio program Loud Fast And Shitty Miret revealed the albums name My Life My Way. By December 22, the band had finished recording the album and Miret described it in a press release as by far the bands catchiest record to date.

Bassist Mike Gallo wrote a majority music on the album.

The albums cover art was created by artist Todd Hubber, who had worked with Miret in the past on designing his street wear clothing line American Made Kustom.

In promotion of the album Agnostic Front released a two song EP featuring "My Life My Way" and "That's Life." In 2017, Nuclear Blast re-released it as a double album alongside Warriors as a part of their classic series.

== Song meanings ==
The albums lyrical content was written by vocalist Roger Miret. "The Sacrifice" is dedicated to people who have sacrificed their lives one way or another to make the world a better place. "A Mi Manera" is the bands title track to the Latin Hardcore scene with Miret dedicating it to Latin people living and overcoming oppression. "Your Worst Enemy" is about making wrong decisions and blaming them on other people, "Empty Dreams" focuses is the putting work into something and then having it fall apart. "Time Has Come" is a tribute to their 1992 album One Voice!. Miret noted that "US Against the World" is not about the USA against the rest of the world, it is instead touches upon "powers that be" vs "the everyday man."

== Music videos ==
The first music video for "Thats Life" was released on March 23, 2011, and was direct by Brian Darwas. A second music video for "A Mi Manera" was released on April 11, and was directed by Dale Resteghini. The third music video for the song "My Life My Way" was released on August 24, 2011, and features many photos of the band throughout their early years. A fourth and final music video was released for the song "Us Against The World" a year after the album’s release on July 12, 2012.

== Critical reception ==
Professional ratings
Review scores
Source	Rating
AllMusic	3/5 stars
Brave Worlds	Mostly positive
Exclaim!	Positive
Metal.de	9/10
Ox-Fanzine	4/5 stars

Jason Lymangrover of AllMusic stated "they have stayed consistent, blending thrash, metalcore, and Oi! styles. Madball/Cannibal Corpse producer Erik Rutan brings out the finer traits of all three styles for My Life My Way, while simultaneously making the band sound as big and heavy as sonically possible." Adding "Roger Miret's distinctive vocals -- which are delivered in more of a yowl than a growl -- are straining but remain powerful, and even (gasp!) melodic at times." An editor from Brave Worlds wrote "It’s very, very tough to pull off convincing tough-guy hardcore, but this disc—all 34 minutes of it being battered, bruised, and beefy chuggah-chuggah ‘core—is as good a representation of the genre as a new album could possibly be in 2011. Sure, it’s a bit cheeseball, but these dudes got balls: two songs in and Miret is calling someone “our angel,” before a bad-ass group chant comes in and kicks everyone’s ass for smirking."

Metal.de added "My Life My Way" is nothing short of a killer album. AGNOSTIC FRONT realize they aren't getting any younger, yet they harness incredible potential from their history, channeling it into top-notch hardcore on this new record. When you wake up in the morning and catch yourself humming "Until The Day I Die" before the alarm even goes off, you know you can face whatever comes your way. AGNOSTIC FRONT is ready."

== Track listing ==
No.	Title	Length
1.	"City Streets"	2:24
2.	"More Than A Memory"	2:39
3.	"Us Against The World"	2:17
4.	"My Life My Way"	3:52
5.	"That’s Life"	1:20
6.	"Until The Day I Die"	2:22
7.	"Now And Forever"	2:52
8.	"The Sacrifice"	3:01
9.	"A Mi Manera"	5:32
10.	"Your Worst Member"	2:23
11.	"Time Has Come"	2:54
Total length:		34:09

== Personnel ==
Agnostic Front

- Roger Miret – vocals
- Vinnie Stigma – guitar
- Joseph James – guitar
- Mike Gallo – bass
- Pokey Mo – drums

Production

- Freddy Cricien – production
- Erik Rutan – recording, mixing
- Alan Douches – recording, mastering,
- Todd Huber – artwork, layout, photography

== Charts ==
Chart (2011)	Peak position
German Albums (Offizielle Top 100)	67
