= Warzone (band) =

American hardcore punk band

- Also known as: Rat Poison
- Origin: New York City, U.S.
- Genre: Hardcore punk
- Years active: 1983–1997
- Labels: Victory; Revelation; Caroline; Fist
- Past members: Raymond "Raybeez" Barbieri; Tommy "Rat" DeRossa; Sebastián "Tito" Pérez; Adam Moochie; Roger Miret; Stevie Love; Brad "Batmite" Davis; Charlie Scalfani; Todd Youth; Luke Abbey; Walter "Righteous" Schreifels; Paul Canade; Jason "Crazy Jay Skin" Vento; John "Omen" Ullman; Erik "E.K" Komst; Bob Mario Cuomo; Jason "J-sin" Lehrhoff; Todd "The Kid" Hamilton; Dray "Bent" Lockdown; Johnn "Depression" Lynch; Vincent "Vinnie Value" Verga; Arthur Smilios; Kent Miller

Warzone (formerly known as Rat Poison) was an American hardcore punk band formed on the Lower East Side of Manhattan in 1983. The band helped develop the New York hardcore sound, the hardcore skinhead style and the youth crew subgenre. During the band's 14 years and many line-up changes, their primarily hardcore sound was flavored by influences ranging from Oi! (they toured several times with The Business and played a cover of their song "The Real Enemy") to traditional punk rock to heavy metal (on their self-titled LP). Their fan base was diverse, with their concerts usually attended by skinheads, straight edge teens, metalheads, and punks of all ages. Vice has written that "one could argue that [Warzone] spearheaded the second and larger wave of hardcore bands that erupted in the NY scene in 1986–1987".

Frontman Raymond "Raybeez" Barbieri was the band's only consistent member through the vast majority of its years. He joined the band as the drummer in 1983 (the same year he played drums on the debut Agnostic Front 7-inch EP United Blood), later taking over vocal duties after Warzone had already been in existence for two years (noting later, "in a band that [had] been running for so long, there has to be something there"). Raybeez remained the singer of Warzone until his death on September 11, 1997, due to pneumonia. A U.S. Navy veteran, he was receiving treatment in a VHA facility when the illness damaged his liver and took his life at the age of 35. A tribute sign reading "R.I.P Ray" hung outside CBGB for some time following his death, and for more than a year afterward, every release on Victory Records was dedicated to his memory, as were two independent compilations. These albums, as well as benefit concerts, raised funds for several non-profit groups Ray had worked for which helped at-risk youth.

== Members ==
- Raymond "Raybeez" Barbieri – lead vocals, early drums
- Tommy "Rat" DeRossa – lead vocals
- Todd Youth – guitars
- Jason "J-Sin" Lehrhoff – guitars
- Paul Canade – guitars
- Jason "Crazy Jay Skin" Vento – guitars
- Stevie Love – guitars, bass
- Brad "Batmite" Davis – guitars, bass
- Tito – guitars, bass
- Walter "Righteous" Schreifels – bass
- John "Omen" Ullman – bass
- Bob "Mario" Cuomo – bass
- Adam Moochie – bass
- Roger Miret – bass
- Todd "The Kid" Hamilton – bass
- Dray "Lockdown" Bent – bass
- John "Johnny Depression" Lynch – drums
- Vinnie Value – drums
- Charlie Scalfani – drums
- Erik "E.K" Komst – drums
- Luke "Lukie" Abbey – drums

== Discography ==
- As One (Demo) (1986)
- Some Records Tape (1986)
- Live on WNYU (7/23/87) (1987)
- Lower East Side Crew (1987) – EP
- Don't Forget the Struggle, Don't Forget the Streets (1987) – LP
- Open Your Eyes (1988) – LP
- Warzone (1989) – LP
- Live at CBGBs (1993) – live EP
- Old School to New School (1994) – LP
- Cause for Alarm/Warzone split with Cause for Alarm (1995) – split 10-inch EP
- Lower East Side (1996) – EP
- The Sound of Revolution (1996) – LP
- Fight for Justice (1997) – LP
- The Victory Years (1998) – partial discography LP
