= Open Your Eyes (Warzone album) =

Studio album by Warzone
- Released: 1988
- Recorded: 1988
- Genre: Hardcore punk
- Length: 26:37
- Labels: Caroline; Another Planet (1994)
- Producers: Dr. Know; Jerry Williams

Warzone chronology
Don't Forget the Struggle, Don't Forget the Streets (1987)	Open Your Eyes (1988)	Warzone (1989)

Re-issue cover
- 1994 Another Planet re-issue – with Don't Forget the Struggle, Don't Forget the Streets on same disc

Professional ratings
Review scores
Source	Rating
AllMusic	4/5 stars
Kerrang!	4/5 stars

Open Your Eyes is the second full-length album from New York hardcore band Warzone. It was released in 1988 on Caroline Records, a year after their first album, Don't Forget The Struggle, Don't Forget The Streets.

It was co-produced by guitarist Dr. Know, of the Washington, D.C. hardcore band, Bad Brains. One of the tracks, "Always – A Friend For Life", was a re-recording of a song from their debut EP, Lower East Side Crew (1987), as was "We're The Crew" from their previous album. In 1994, Another Planet re-issued the album on the same disc as Don't Forget The Struggle....

Lyrically, the band strived to distance themselves from the racist skinhead label, which had haunted them from inception. Other lyrics discussed oppression, togetherness, and the sense of belonging to a bigger, extended family. Musically, the album featured straightforward New York Hardcore with plenty of room for mosh indulgence. However, the first signs of musical experimentation emerged with occasional guitar flourishes.

== Track listing ==
- All songs written by Warzone
1. "Open Up Your Eyes" – 4:29
2. "Dance Hard or Die" – 1:17
3. "Face Up to It" – 2:06
4. "Always – A Friend for Life" – 2:41
5. "Racism – World History Part I" – 2:44
6. "Back to School Again" – 3:01
7. "The American Movement" – 2:31
8. "Fight the Oppressor" – 2:50
9. "Deceive Us – No More" – 2:37
10. "Striving Higher for a Better Life" – 2:23

== Credits ==
- Raymond "Raybeez" Barbieri – vocals
- Paul – guitar
- Crazy "Jay" Skin – guitar
- John "Omen" – bass
- E.K. – drums
- Produced by Dr. Know and Jerry Williams
- Re-issue mastered by Alan Douches at West Westside Music
