= Something's Gotta Give (album) =

Studio album by Agnostic Front
- Released: June 30, 1998
- Recorded: Explosive Sound Design (Hoboken, New Jersey)
- Genre: Hardcore punk
- Length: 32:44
- Label: Epitaph Records
- Producers: Billy Milano, Roger Miret

Agnostic Front chronology
Last Warning (1993)	Something's Gotta Give (1998)	Riot, Riot, Upstart (1999)

Professional ratings
Review scores
Source	Rating
AllMusic	3.5/5 stars

Something's Gotta Give is the fifth full-length studio album by New York hardcore band Agnostic Front. It was released in June 1998 on Epitaph Records and follows 1995's Raw Unleashed compilation album. It is actually the first studio album since 1992's One Voice. The album was co-produced by Billy Milano, the frontman of crossover thrash bands S.O.D. and M.O.D.

The album marks a return to a more hardcore punk style of sound, rather than the thrash metal inspired music of One Voice. Backing vocals, amongst others, were provided by Tim Armstrong and Lars Frederiksen of Rancid, and Jimmy Gestapo of Murphy's Law. Another album swiftly followed in 1999, Riot, Riot, Upstart.

The track "Gotta Go" appeared on a volume of Epitaph Records' Punk-o-Rama compilation series. The song "Pauly the Dog" is a variation of Johnny Cash's "Dirty Old Egg-Sucking Dog".

== Track listing ==
No.	Title	Length
1.	"Something's Gotta Give"	1:52
2.	"Believe"	1:38
3.	"Gotta Go"	3:35
4.	"Before My Eyes"	2:10
5.	"No Fear"	2:01
6.	"Blinded"	2:42
7.	"Voices"	2:16
8.	"Do or Die"	2:12
9.	"My War"	2:14
10.	"Bloodsucker"	1:41
11.	"The Blame"	2:11
12.	"Today, Tomorrow, Forever"	2:27
13.	"Rage"	1:32
14.	"Pauly the Dog"	0:48
15.	"Crucified" (Iron Cross cover)	3:25
Total length:		32:44

== Personnel ==
Agnostic Front

- Roger Miret – vocals
- Vinnie Stigma – guitars
- Rob Kabula – bass
- Jim Colletti – drums

Other musicians

- Brad Logan – additional guitars, backing vocals
- Tim Armstrong – backing vocals on "Gotta Go"
- Lars Frederiksen – backing vocals on "Gotta Go"

Production

- Recorded at Explosive Sound Design in Hoboken, New Jersey
- Produced by Billy Milano and Roger Miret
- Engineered by Billy Milano
