= Sab Grey =

Sab Grey (real name: Frederick Prasunitz) is the founder of Iron Cross, the United States' first skinhead hardcore/Oi! band. As a teenager, he began to attend hardcore punk concerts in Washington D.C., where he met Ian Mackaye, Henry Rollins, and others in the burgeoning Washington, D.C. hardcore subculture.

In 1980, he founded Iron Cross. The band's name, as well as the skinhead look favored by its members, led to accusations of fascism which Grey has always denied. Iron Cross released a handful of EPs, later released together as the album Live For Now, on GMM records (GMM174.) Their song "Crucified" became a hardcore classic after being covered by Agnostic Front. Other bands who have covered their songs include Dropkick Murphys (You're A Rebel) and English Oi! band The Business (Crucified.) Weary of the controversy surrounding the band, Grey dismantled it in 1985 and moved to England in 1986. He later returned to the U.S. to start the rockabilly/ska/punk-influenced Royal Americans. As of 2006, Grey continued to play with the Royal Americans and occasionally touring with a new lineup of Iron Cross.

Sab Grey lives in Baltimore, Maryland and is the author of two novels: Skinhead Army (2007) and Hated and Proud (2009), both published by Skinflint Press.
