= Roger Miret and the Disasters =

American punk band

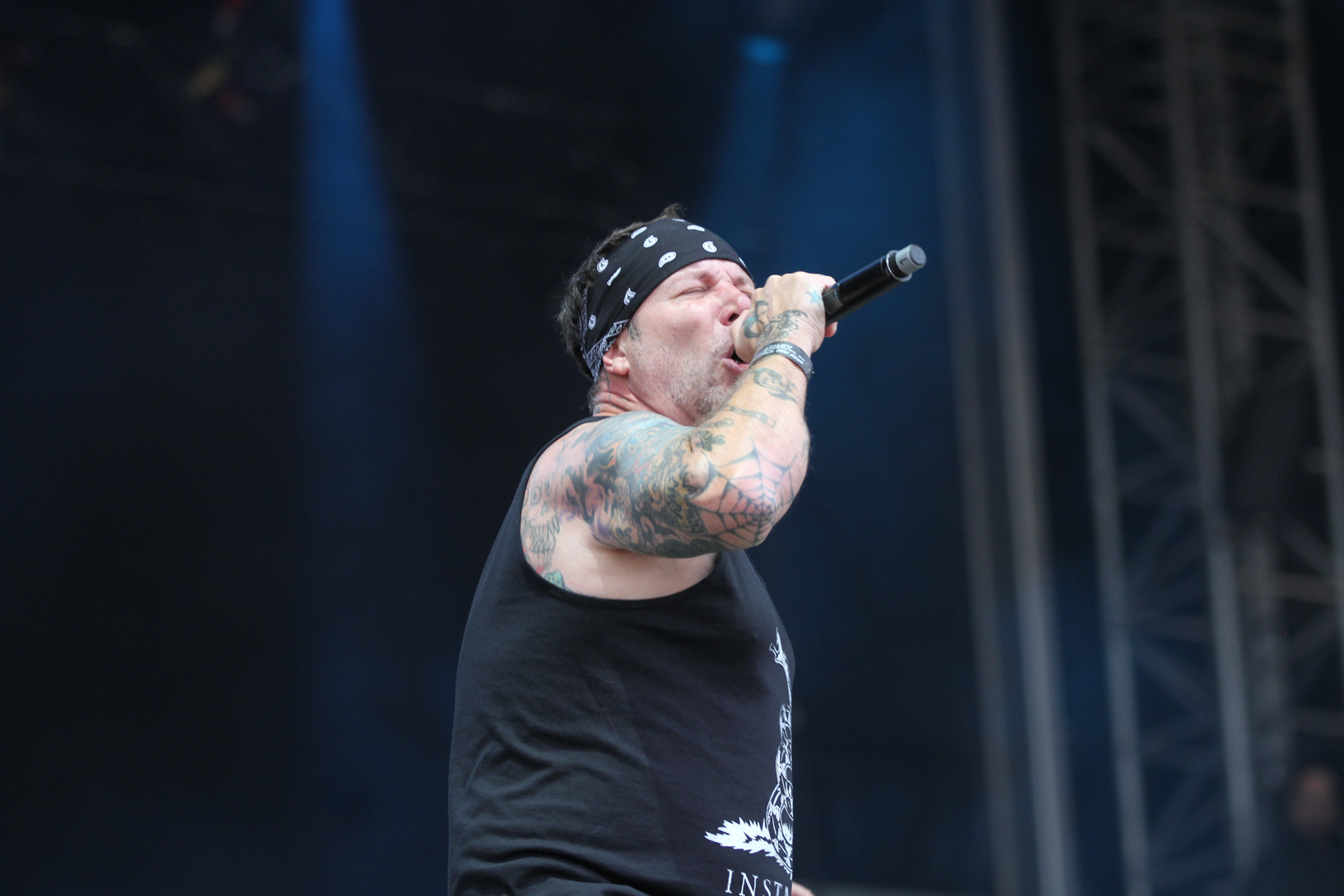
- Roger Miret live in 2013

Background information
- Origin: United States
- Genres: Punk rock; Oi!; street punk
- Years active: 1999–present
- Labels: Hellcat, Sailor's Grave, People Like You
- Members: Roger Miret; Rhys Kill; Roy Valencia; Pete Sosa
- Past members: Randy Rost; Mike Mulieri; Johnny Rioux; Johnny Kray; JP Otto; Luke Rota; Joey Nayls
- Website: thedisasters.com

Roger Miret and the Disasters are an American punk rock band formed by Agnostic Front frontman Roger Miret in 1999. The group has released four studio albums.

== History ==
The band started when Miret was writing songs that were not a style suitable for Lady Luck (a band fronted by his wife Denise) or Agnostic Front, so he started recording them on his own on a Boss recorder. Johnny Rioux had previously mentioned he would like to work with him, so Rioux helped Miret on what originally started as a solo project. Then Miret met Rhys Kill, who liked the material and joined in on the project. The band then recorded a demo tape, with Miret and Kill on guitar, Rioux on bass and Matt Kelly from the Dropkick Murphys on drums. That six-song demo found reviewed by Lars Frederiksen, who passed it off to his Rancid bandmate Tim Armstrong. He asked Miret to put his project out on Hellcat Records. As Kelly could not continue with Miret due to his commitments with Dropkick Murphys, Miret asked Johnny Kray of The Krays and New York Rel-X to join on drums. After a couple rehearsals, they decided to make it a band.

Their first recorded appearances were in 2001, with "It's Alright", from the six-song demo with Matt Kelly, appearing on Scene Killer 3 and covers of Cock Sparrer's "England Belongs to Me" (dubbed "New York Belongs to Me") and Blitz's "Voice of a Generation" appearing on The Worldwide Tribute to the Real Oi! Volume 2. Their debut release was their self-titled album, which came out in September 2002. The band's first lineup change came with Joey Nails replacing Rioux on bass by August 2003. It was then announced in January 2004 that Chris Watson replaced Nails and then Brian Darwas took over for drums as of April 2004, leaving only Miret and Kill as original members. Following one more lineup change, with Darwas moving over to bass and Mike Mulieri taking over drums as of September 2004, the band recorded their second album in Fall 2004. The album, 1984, was released early the next year and became their last release on Hellcat. The next year, they released My Riot on Sailor's Grave Records. In January 2011, the band released their fourth album, Gotta Get Up Now, on German label People Like You Records.

In a 2019 interview Miret stated that there were new songs written for the Disasters however he wanted to remain focused on Agnostic Fronts album Get Loud! which came around the same time.

== Members ==
=== Current ===
- Roger Miret – guitar, vocals
- Rhys Kill – guitar, vocals
- Roy Valencia – bass, vocals
- Pete Sosa – drums

=== Former ===
- Johnny Rioux – bass
- Joey Nail – bass
- Chris Watson – bass
- Brian Darwas – drums, bass
- Mike Mulieri – drums
- Johnny Kray – drums
- Luke Rota – drums
- J.P. Otto – drums
- Randy Rost – guitar

== Discography ==
=== Studio albums ===
- Roger Miret and the Disasters (2002)
- 1984 (2005)
- My Riot (2006)
- Gotta Get Up Now (2011)

=== EPs ===
- Faded (7") (2010)
- We're Gonna Find a Way (Dub Remix) (7") (2011)

=== Compilation appearances ===
- Scene Killer Vol. 3 (2001)
  - Includes demo version of "It's Alright", later re-recorded for Roger Miret and the Disasters
- Give 'Em the Boot III (2002)
  - Includes "Give 'Em the Boot", later released on Roger Miret and the Disasters
- The Worldwide Tribute to the Real Oi, Vol. 2 (2002)
  - Includes "New York Belongs to Me", later released on Roger Miret and the Disasters and the exclusive "Voice of a Generation"
- Give 'Em the Boot IV (2004)
  - Includes "Kiss Kiss Kill Kill" from Roger Miret and the Disasters
- Punk-O-Rama Vol. 10
  - Include "Riot, Riot, Riot" from 1984 as well as the music video for the same song
- Give 'Em the Boot V (2006)
  - Includes "Another Generation" from the 1984 sessions, later re-recorded for My Riot
