= Live at CBGB (Agnostic Front album) =

Live album by Agnostic Front
- Released: 1989
- Recorded: August 21, 1988, CBGB, New York City
- Genres: Hardcore punk, crossover thrash
- Length: 33:48
- Label: Relativity Records
- Producer: Norman Dunn

Agnostic Front chronology
Liberty and Justice For... (1987)	Live at CBGB (1989)	One Voice (1992)

Professional ratings
Review scores
Source	Rating
AllMusic	3/5 stars

Live at CBGB is an album of live recordings from New York hardcore band Agnostic Front. It was released in 1989 on Relativity Records and follows their third studio album, Liberty and Justice For..., from 1987. It is one of many available live albums by the band – their next was 1993's Last Warning and most recent Live at CBGB - 25 Years of Blood, Honor and Truth from 2006.

The line-up featured one change from the previous studio album – Craig Setari replacing Alan Peters on bass. Shortly after the album's release, Roger Miret was imprisoned and another album was not made until 1992 with One Voice.

== Track listing ==
No.	Title	Music	Length
1.	"Victim in Pain"	Roger Miret	0:49
2.	"Public Assistance"	Rob Kabula, Peter Steele	2:45
3.	"United Blood"	Vinnie Stigma	1:20
4.	"Friend or Foe"	Stigma	1:21
5.	"Strength"	Steve Martin	2:36
6.	"Blind Justice"	Miret	1:22
7.	"Last Warning"	Miret, Stigma	0:43
8.	"Toxic Shock"	Kabula, Miret, Steele	1:50
9.	"United and Strong"	Miret	1:34
10.	"Crucified"	Iron Cross	2:22
11.	"Liberty and Justice"	Alan Peters	2:46
12.	"Discriminate Me"	Stigma	0:35
13.	"Your Mistake"	Miret	1:25
14.	"Anthem"	Martin, Miret, Peters	2:38
15.	"With Time"	Miret	2:08
16.	"Genesis"	Miret	1:33
17.	"The Pain Song"	Agnostic Front	1:09
18.	"Fascist Attitudes"	Miret	1:50
19.	"The Eliminator"	Kabula, Miret, Steele	3:02
Total length:			33:48

== Personnel ==
Agnostic Front

- Roger Miret – vocals
- Vinnie Stigma – lead guitar
- Steve Martin – rhythm guitar
- Craig Setari – bass
- Will Shepler – drums

Production

- Recorded August 21, 1988 at CBGB, New York City
- Produced by Norman Dunn
- Engineered by Steve McAllister, Tommy Victor, and Gil Abarbanel
- Cover art by Andrea Elston
