= Don't Forget the Struggle, Don't Forget the Streets =

Studio album by Warzone
- Released: 1988
- Recorded: August 1987; Studio X, Ridgewood, New Jersey, U.S.
- Genre: Hardcore punk
- Length: 25:38
- Label: Fist Records; Caroline Records (1988); Another Planet (1994); Revelation Records (2016)
- Producer: Warzone; Fink

Warzone chronology
Lower East Side Crew EP (1987)	Don't Forget the Struggle, Don't Forget the Streets (1988)	Open Your Eyes (1989)

Re-issue cover

Professional ratings
Review scores
Source	Rating
Allmusic	3/5 stars

Don't Forget the Struggle, Don't Forget the Streets is the first full-length album from New York hardcore (NYHC) band Warzone.

Following the band's 1987 debut release, the Lower East Side Crew EP, it was first released on the band's own label, Fist Records, before being licensed and re-released in 1988 on Caroline Records, The track "We're The Crew" was previously available on the EP, but was re-recorded for this album.

In 1994, Another Planet re-issued the album on the same disc as Open Your Eyes, something the label did with similar NYHC bands of the same era, such as Murphy's Law, Cro-Mags, and Leeway.

Revelation Records reissued the album with its original artwork in 2016.

== Overview ==
The music on this album was what New York hardcore (and hardcore in general) became known for: short, fast songs with shouted socio-political lyrics, heavy but basic guitar riffs, gang chants, and attitude. The title track became a slogan for hardcore youth, and one of the most covered tracks by other New York hardcore bands. Other songs such as "Crazy But Not Insane" and "As One" had a similar impact.

The band encountered many controversies after the release of this album, partly because the cover, which looked like an iron cross, could have political connotations — particularly since the band and many of their fans had a skinhead appearance. Raybeez explained that being a skinhead in the U.S. had a different meaning than in Europe; American hardcore skinheads were patriotic, but not racist. The song "Skinhead Youth" was about unity and brotherhood, rather than alienation and violence.

The production quality was DIY, and the musicianship, which the band even admits was not a priority, is pure punk (i.e. basic). The liner notes include the line: "Hardcore music is a movement — not a business."

== Track listing ==
- All songs written by Warzone
1. "Intro Bust" – 2:11
2. "It's Your Choice" – 1:50
3. "Crazy But Not Insane" – 2:14
4. "Fuck Your Attitude" – 1:27
5. "As One" – 1:50
6. "We're the Crew" – 2:03
7. "Don't Forget the Struggle, Don't Forget the Streets" – 2:36
8. "In the Mirror" – 2:42
9. "Skinhead Youth" – 1:24
10. "Growing Up, the Next Step" – 2:53
11. "Judgement Day" – 1:25
12. "Fighting for Our Country" – 3:04

== Personnel ==
- Raymond "Raybeez" Barbieri – vocals
- Paul – guitar
- Crazy "Jay" Skin ( Jay Vento ) – guitar
- John "Omen" – bass
- Lukie Luke – drums
- Recorded August, 1987 at Studio X, Ridgewood, New Jersey, USA
- Produced by Warzone Posse and Fink
- Engineered by Rick Reineke
- Re-issue mastered by Alan Douches at West Westside Music
