= Roger Miret and the Disasters (album) =

Studio album by Roger Miret and the Disasters
- Released: September 10, 2002
- Recorded: 2002
- Genre: Punk rock; Oi!; street punk
- Length: 31:17
- Label: Hellcat
- Producer: Roger Miret and the Disasters

Roger Miret and the Disasters chronology
Roger Miret and the Disasters (2002)	1984 (2005)

Professional ratings
Review scores
Source	Rating
AllMusic	link
Ox-Fanzine	5/10
Punknews.org	3.5/5 stars
Exclaim!	positive

Roger Miret and the Disasters is the debut studio album by American punk rock band Roger Miret and the Disasters. It was released on September 10, 2002.

"New York Belongs to Me" is a cover of Cock Sparrer's "England Belongs to Me", with a few word changes. The cover originally appeared on Worldwide Tribute to the Real Oi, Vol. 2

== Track listing ==
All songs by Roger Miret and the Disasters unless otherwise noted.

1. "Run, Johnny, Run" – 2:26
2. "Kiss, Kiss. Kill, Kill" – 1:44
3. "Give 'Em the Boot" – 2:08
4. "Radio, Radio" – 2:14
5. "It's Alright" – 2:12
6. "Boys Will Be Boys" – 1:54
  - Contains an interpolation of "Ole, Ole, Ole (We Are the Champions)" (Dee/Verlooven)
7. "Screw You" – 2:30
8. "Smash It Up" – 2:45
9. "Punch the Clock" – 2:26
10. "Gal Friend" – 2:00
11. "Just Us" – 2:05
12. "Breakaway" – 2:07
13. "Look at Me" – 1:53
14. "New York Belongs to Me" (Steve Bruce, Steve Burgess, Colin McFaull, Mick Beaufoy) – 2:53

== Credits ==
- Roger Miret – vocals, guitar
- Rhys Kill – guitar
- Johnny Rioux – bass, vocals
- Johnny Kray – drums
- Kirsten de Boer – piano on "Kiss Kiss Kill Kill", guest vocals on "Give 'Em the Boot" "Radio, Radio"
- Al Barr – guest vocals on "Screw You"
- Ken Casey – guest vocals on Give 'Em the Boot
- Stephanie Doughtery – guest vocals on "Radio, Radio" and "Boys Will Be Boys"
