= 1984 (Roger Miret and the Disasters album) =

Studio album by Roger Miret and the Disasters
- Released: February 22, 2005
- Recorded: 2004
- Genre: Punk rock; Oi!; street punk
- Length: 29:37
- Label: Hellcat
- Producer: Roger Miret

Roger Miret and the Disasters chronology
Roger Miret and the Disasters (2002)	1984 (2005)	My Riot (2006)

Professional ratings
Review scores
Source	Rating
AllMusic	2.5/5 stars
Punknews.org	3.5/5 stars

1984 is the second studio album by American punk rock band Roger Miret and the Disasters. It was released on February 22, 2005.

== Track listing ==
All tracks are written by Roger Miret and the Disasters.

No.	Title	Length
1.	"Loud and Proud"	2:58
2.	"Riot, Riot, Riot"	1:40
3.	"1984"	2:19
4.	"The Boys"	2:09
5.	"Turncoat"	2:03
6.	"Lower East Side"	2:14
7.	"Hooligans"	2:29
8.	"Street Rock 'N' Roll"	2:05
9.	"I Don't Like You"	1:18
10.	"Kill For Cash"	2:59
11.	"Shot, Stabbed and Fooled"	2:23
12.	"Janie Hawk"	3:35
13.	"New York City"	1:25

== Credits ==
- Roger Miret – vocals, guitar
- Rhys Kill – guitar, backup vocals
- Brian Darwas – bass, backup vocals
- Mike Mulieri – drums, backup vocals
- Al Barr – guest vocals on "The Boys"
- Matt Ciotti – backup vocals
- Dave Alvarado – backup vocals
- John Jensen – backup vocals
- Luke245 – backup vocals
- Franco Bronx – backup vocals
- Zeuss – engineering, mixing
- Alan Douches – mastering
