= Dead Yuppies =

Studio album by Agnostic Front
- Released: September 25, 2001
- Studios: Big Blue Meenie Studios, Jersey City, New Jersey
- Genre: Hardcore punk
- Length: 29:11
- Label: Epitaph
- Producer: Roger Miret

Agnostic Front chronology
Unity (1999)	Dead Yuppies (2001)	Another Voice (2004)

Professional ratings
Review scores
Source	Rating
AllMusic	3/5 stars
Rock Sound	4/5 stars

Dead Yuppies is the seventh full-length studio album from New York hardcore band Agnostic Front. It was released in September 2001 on Epitaph Records and follows 1999's Riot, Riot, Upstart. Due to the title, the release of the album was delayed in the United States and a sticker was placed on the cover by the record company following the September 11 attacks.

The track "Love to Be Hated" appears on a volume of Epitaph Records' Punk-O-Rama compilation series, but the band left the label shortly after release and recorded a split album with Discipline, Working Class Heroes, in 2002 before signing to Nuclear Blast Records in 2004.

== Track listing ==
No.	Title	Length
1.	"I Wanna Know"	2:21
2.	"Out of Reach"	2:01
3.	"Everybody's a Critic"	1:15
4.	"Liberty"	2:44
5.	"Club Girl"	1:41
6.	"Uncle Sam"	1:48
7.	"Urban Decadence"	1:56
8.	"Love to Be Hated"	2:13
9.	"No Mercy"	1:34
10.	"Politician"	2:08
11.	"Pedophile"	2:27
12.	"Alright"	2:31
13.	"Dead Yuppies"	2:47
14.	"Standing on My Own"	1:45
Total length:		29:11

== Personnel ==
Agnostic Front

- Roger Miret – vocals
- Vinnie Stigma – guitars
- Mike Gallo – bass
- Jim Colletti – drums

Production

- Recorded at Big Blue Meenie Studios, Jersey City, New Jersey
- Produced by Roger Miret
- Engineered by Tim Gilles and Erin Farley
