= United Blood =

EP by Agnostic Front
- Released: 1983
- Studios: Demo Studios, New York City
- Genre: Hardcore punk
- Length: 6:22
- Labels: AF Records, Bridge9
- Producer: Don Fury

Agnostic Front chronology
United Blood (1983)	Victim in Pain (1984)

Alternative cover
- 2009 Bridge9 reissue

United Blood is the debut EP 7" from New York hardcore band Agnostic Front. It was released in 1983 on their own AF Records label. 1,000 copies in total were pressed.

In 2009, Bridge9 re-released the first authorized vinyl release of United Blood in almost 14 years to recognize the 25th anniversary since the original release of Victim in Pain in 1984.

== Track listing ==
All tracks are written by Agnostic Front.

Side A
No.	Title	Length
1.	"No One Rules"	0:25
2.	"Final War"	0:22
3.	"Last Warning"	0:48
4.	"Traitor"	0:25
5.	"Friend or Foe"	1:16

Side B
No.	Title	Length
6.	"United Blood"	1:13
7.	"Fight"	0:15
8.	"Discriminate Me"	0:42
9.	"In Control"	0:30
10.	"Crucial Changes"	0:26
Total length:		6:22

== Personnel ==
=== Band ===
- Roger Miret – vocals
- Vinnie Stigma – guitars
- Adam Mucci – bass
- Ray Barbieri – drums

=== Technical ===
- Don Fury - production, mixing
- Glenn Schiller - graphics
- Alex Morris, Annie, Elio Espana, Judy - artwork, photography
- Randy Underwood - photography
