= Liberty and Justice For... =

Studio album by Agnostic Front
- Released: 1987
- Genres: Crossover thrash, hardcore punk
- Length: 25:50
- Label: Relativity / Combat
- Producer: Norman Dunn

Agnostic Front chronology
Cause for Alarm (1986)	Liberty and Justice For... (1987)	Live at CBGB (1989)

Professional ratings
Review scores
Source	Rating
AllMusic	4/5 stars

Liberty and Justice For... is the third full-length studio album from New York hardcore band Agnostic Front. It was released in 1987 on Relativity/Combat Records and follows 1986's Cause for Alarm. Live at CBGB followed this album in 1989 featuring songs from the band's first three albums and EP.

The band further explored the crossover direction they had begun on their previous album, whilst still keeping the songs to the bare minimum duration-wise. Almost wholesale changes in line-up had taken place since the previous album with the rhythm section and second guitar slot all seeing new players.

== Track listing ==
No.	Title	Music	Length
1.	"Liberty and Justice"	Alan Peters	2:56
2.	"Crucial Moment"	Steve Martin	1:08
3.	"Strength"	Martin	2:43
4.	"Genesis"	Roger Miret	1:37
5.	"Anthem"	Martin, Miret, Peters	2:52
6.	"Another Side"	Martin, Miret, Peters	2:51
7.	"Happened Yesterday"	Martin	2:29
8.	"Lost"	Miret, Peters	1:59
9.	"Hypocrisy"	Martin	2:47
10.	"Crucified"	Iron Cross	2:28
11.	"Censored"	Martin, Miret	2:00
Total length:			25:50

== Personnel ==
Agnostic Front

- Roger Miret – vocals
- Vinnie Stigma – guitar
- Steve Martin – lead guitar
- Alan Peters – bass
- Will Shepler – drums

Production

- Produced by Norman Dunn
- Engineered by Alex Perialas
