= Last Warning (album) =

Compilation album by Agnostic Front
- Released: 1993
- Recorded: 1983; December 20, 1992; CBGB, New York City
- Genre: Hardcore punk
- Length: 46:21
- Label: Relativity Records
- Producers: Agnostic Front, Don Fury

Agnostic Front chronology
One Voice (1992)	Last Warning (1993)	Something's Gotta Give (1998)

Professional ratings
Review scores
Source	Rating
AllMusic	link

Last Warning is a compilation album by New York hardcore band Agnostic Front. It was released in 1993 on Relativity Records, marketed by Roadrunner Records, and follows 1992's studio album, One Voice.

The first eleven tracks—often consisting of two songs strung together—were recorded live in December 1992 at CBGB in New York City. The remainder of the CD is the band's 1983 7-inch EP, United Blood. It contrasts the later crossover thrash style the band had adopted in later releases with the raw New York hardcore style of their debut release. The album was originally intended to be the band's last release, but they reformed some five years later and released the album Something's Gotta Give.

== Track listing ==
All songs written by Agnostic Front, except for "Crucified" (Iron Cross).

No.	Title	Length
1.	"Undertow"	3:47
2.	"Your Mistake"/"Victim in Pain"	2:21
3.	"One Voice"	3:56
4.	"Infiltrate"/"Strength"	3:59
5.	"United Blood"	1:36
6.	"Public Assistance"/"Over the Edge"	6:39
7.	"Blind Justice"/"Last Warning"	2:01
8.	"Crucified"	2:51
9.	"Toxic Shock"/"United & Strong"	3:25
10.	"Fascist Attitudes"	2:37
11.	"Anthem"/"The Eliminator"	6:37
12.	"No One Rules"	0:25
13.	"Final War"	0:22
14.	"Last Warning"	0:48
15.	"Traitor"	0:25
16.	"Friend or Foe"	1:16
17.	"United Blood"	1:13
18.	"Fight"	0:15
19.	"Discriminate Me"	0:42
20.	"In Control"	0:30
21.	"Crucial Changes"	0:25
22.	"I'm Still Here"	0:34
Total length:		46:21

== Personnel ==
=== Tracks 1–11 ===
Agnostic Front

- Roger Miret – vocals
- Vinnie Stigma – lead guitar
- Matt Henderson – rhythm guitar
- Craig Setari – bass
- Will Shepler – drums

Production

- Recorded live at CBGB, New York, on December 20, 1992
- Produced by Don Fury
- Engineered by Rick Roy
- Mixed at Don Fury Studios by Don Kiddick

=== Tracks 12–22 ===
Agnostic Front

- Roger Miret – vocals
- Vinnie Stigma – guitars
- Adam Moochie – bass
- Raybeez – drums

Production

- Tracks taken from the United Blood 7-inch EP, released in 1983 on Last Warning Records
- Produced by Agnostic Front and Stephen Elliott
