= Warriors (Agnostic Front album) =

Studio album by Agnostic Front
- Released: November 6, 2007
- Recorded: June 2007
- Genres: Hardcore punk, crossover thrash
- Length: 32:14
- Label: Nuclear Blast
- Producer: Freddy Cricien

Agnostic Front chronology
Another Voice (2004)	Warriors (2007)	My Life My Way (2011)

Warriors is the ninth full-length studio album from New York hardcore band Agnostic Front released on November 6, 2007. The album is produced by Madball frontman Freddy Cricien, who is the half-brother of Agnostic Front frontman Roger Miret. It’s the first and only album to feature guitarst Joseph James and the last to feature drummer Steve Gallo.

== Background ==
The entire album was written while Agnostic Front was on tour in Australia and Japan. Lead singer Roger Miret later commented on the album’s writing and recording process stating:

You know what, to be honest with you, it was easy. We were in Japan and Australia at the time. ‘For My Family’ came to me on a plane ride between Japan and Australia. As soon as I got off the plane I said, ‘Look, I got a song’. We checked into the hotel, I asked Joe to get his guitar and Mike to get his bass, then I sang the lyric part, and the whole thing continued from there. And that’s how we did things; sometimes at sound checks we’d work on some riffs, too. And you also had the technology then to just send stuff back and forth. So later the guys in New York could just send stuff to me – as you know, I live in Arizona – and I’d work on it doing my vocals and whatever, then send it back.

The band’s guitarist Joseph James explained that their time in Japan and the country’s culture and "warriors code" greatly influenced the album and its name.

The album sold around 1,100 copies in its first week. In 2017 the album was re-released in a double-package with its 2011 successor My Life My Way.

Agnostic Front took part in the 2007 Persistence European Tour, and also held their own European and South American headlining tours in support of the album.

== Critical reception ==
Professional ratings
Review scores
Source	Rating
AllMusic	3/5 stars
Blabbermouth.net	8/10
Exclaim!	Positive
Metal Temple Magazine	7/10
Metal.de	8/10
Ox-Fanzine	8/10
Punknews.org	3.5/5 stars

Warriors was met with positive reception, Blabbermouth.net wrote "As with any new album by a legendary hardcore band, "Warriors" will forever be compared to any number of early "classic" releases. Don't use that as an excuse to bypass this one though. "Warriors" deserves to be heard and given its due recognition. All these years later and AGNOSTIC FRONT continues to be one of the world's greatest hardcore bands." Keith Carman of Exclaim! stated "Warriors takes longer strides into the aforementioned thrash/death metal sonic affront but this time, the steps are confident and bold." Comparing it to the band previous release Another Voice he added "Warriors is proof that occasionally a step back or sideways can inevitable make for two leaps forward."

German reviewer Ox-Fanzine added "regardless of whether one is discussing the more metallic songs, the punkier tracks, or the songs in which Agnostic Front blends both styles (such as the title track), one thing is clear following *Warriors*: this band is back, and they are delivering an energy-charged sound that—after a quarter-century of band history—can almost be called timeless." Punknews.org claimed "Different, certainly, to some degree, but still Agnostic Front and still no-holds-barred hardcore. With tight, fierce songs that come packing a punch, Warriors is a welcome addition to Agnostic Front's already stacked catalog no fan should be without."

== Track listing ==
No.	Title	Length
1.	"Addiction"	2:20
2.	"Dead to Me"	2:52
3.	"Outraged"	1:54
4.	"Warriors"	2:07
5.	"Black and Blue"	2:34
6.	"Change Your Ways"	1:53
7.	"For My Family"	2:22
8.	"No Regrets"	1:48
9.	"Revenge"	3:12
10.	"We Want the Truth"	2:24
11.	"By My Side (feat. Bryan Harris)"	2:51
12.	"Come Alive"	2:02
13.	"All These Years"	1:58
14.	"Forgive Me Mother"	1:56
Total length:		32:14

== Credits ==
Agnostic Front

- Roger Miret — lead vocals
- Steve Gallo — drums, backing vocals
- Mike Gallo — bass, backing vocals
- Vinnie Stigma — guitar, backing vocals
- Joseph James — guitar

Crew

- Freddy Cricien — producer
