= Another Voice =

Studio album by Agnostic Front
- Released: November 22, 2004
- Genres: Hardcore punk, tough guy hardcore
- Length: 27:43
- Label: Nuclear Blast
- Producers: Zeuss, Jamey Jasta

Agnostic Front chronology
Dead Yuppies (2001)	Another Voice (2004)	Warriors (2007)

Professional ratings
Review scores
Source	Rating
AllMusic	3.5/5 stars

Another Voice is the eighth full-length studio album from New York hardcore band Agnostic Front. It was released in November 2004 on Nuclear Blast Records (January 2005 in the US) and follows 2002's split album with Discipline, Working Class Heroes. It was the first recording on the label and was co-produced by Jamey Jasta of the band Hatebreed. It features many guest vocal spots. 2006 saw the release of another live album, Live at CBGB – 25 Years of Blood, Honor and Truth.

== Track listing ==
All tracks written by Agnostic Front.

No.	Title	Length
1.	"Still Here" (feat. Karl Buechner)	2:25
2.	"All Is Not Forgotten"	1:54
3.	"Fall of the Parasite"	1:16
4.	"Pride, Faith, Respect"	1:36
5.	"So Pure to Me"	2:00
6.	"Dedication"	2:46
7.	"Peace" (feat. Jamey Jasta)	2:19
8.	"Take Me Back"	1:35
9.	"Hardcore! (The Definition)"	2:19
10.	"Casualty of the Times"	2:05
11.	"No One Hears You"	1:38
12.	"I Live It"	2:11
13.	"It's for Life"	1:37
14.	"Another Voice" (feat. Scott Vogel)	4:32
Total length:		27:43

== Personnel ==
Agnostic Front

- Roger Miret – vocals
- Vinnie Stigma – guitar
- Matt Henderson – lead guitar
- Mike Gallo – bass
- Steve Gallo – drums

Production

- Billy Siegel – additional guitars
- Karl Buechner (Earth Crisis, Freya) – backing vocals
- Armand Crump – backing vocals
- Brian Darwas – backing vocals
- Lenny DiSclafani – backing vocals
- Josh Grden – backing vocals
- Joe Harrington – backing vocals
- Henry Hurteau – backing vocals
- Ian Larrabee – backing vocals
- Ivan Murillo – backing vocals
- Matt Pike – backing vocals
- John O'Grady – backing vocals
- Jamey Jasta (Hatebreed) – backing vocals
- Paul Romanko (Shadows Fall) – backing vocals
- Brian Schmidt – backing vocals
- Scott Vogel (Terror) – backing vocals
- Produced by Zeuss and Jamey Jasta
- Engineered by Zeuss and Dean Baltulonis
- Mastered by Alan Douches
