= Iron Cross (American band) =

American punk band

- Origin: Washington D.C., U.S.
- Genres: Oi!, hardcore punk
- Years active: 1980–2012
- Labels: Dischord, Skinflint, Koi, 13th State, Teenage Heart, Lost and Found, GMM
- Members: Sab Grey; Dante Ferrando; Mark Haggerty; John Falls; Wendel Blow; John Dunn; Paul Cleary; Scotty Powers; Dimitri Medevev†; Mark Linskey; Shadwick Wilde; Joey Nails

Iron Cross was an American Oi! / hardcore punk band from Washington D.C. They played a rough form of Oi! and were the first band in the US to adopt the skinhead look and the Oi! musical style. Some of its members had close ties to the Washington hardcore punk subculture, due to its relationship with other hardcore bands, with Ian Mackaye, and with Dischord Records. Singer Sab Grey was one of the many roommates in the Dischord House in Arlington, Virginia. The band's name, and the fact that most of its members were skinheads, led to accusations of fascism, which Grey and others in the band and the original D.C. skins, always denied, declaring that they "hate Nazis".

== Career ==
Iron Cross formed in 1980, when Dante Ferrando met Sab Grey. Ferrando was previously in the band Broken Cross with Mark Haggerty. When Grey and Ferrando decided to start a new band, Grey suggested the name Iron Cross. The first lineup consisted of Grey on lead vocals, Haggerty on guitar, Ferrando on drums and John Falls on bass guitar. This lineup lasted a very short time, with Falls leaving after Iron Cross's early show at American University. After Falls' departure, the band went through two more bassists before settling on Wendel Blow, the former bassist for the D.C. hardcore punk band State of Alert. The only non-skinhead in the band was Ferrando, who maintained a spiky punk hairstyle. The band's fourth lineup lasted until just after the recording of their first EP, Skinhead Glory. That EP features their signature song "Crucified", which was later covered by many Oi! and hardcore bands.

After Blow left the band, he was replaced by John Dunn. Dunn had been an original member of the D.C. skins and was close friends with the band's members. Dunn left the band just before the release of their second EP, Hated and Proud. He was replaced by Paul Cleary, who was a founding member of the D.C. bands Trenchmouth and Black Market Baby. The 1982 Dischord Records compilation Flex Your Head introduced three Iron Cross songs to an audience beyond the eastern United States.

In 1985, after further lineup changes that left Grey as the only original member of Iron Cross, the band broke up. Ferrando formed the band Gray Matter with Haggerty. Haggerty went on to play with the bands 3 and Severin. Ferrando also played in the band Ignition and is now the owner of the D.C. club The Black Cat. Falls joined the band Egypt Central.

== New lineup ==
In 2001, Iron Cross re-released their EPs and previously unreleased material in the form of the full-length CD Live For Now. Grey played with The Royal Americans (a rockabilly-style band).

A split release with British Oi! band Combat 84 was planned for release on GMM Records in 2002, although this recording never materialized. The mini-album Two Piece and a Biscuit, featuring four songs from Iron Cross and three from The Royal Americans, was released in 2007 on 13th State Records.

By 2009, the lineup was: Sab Grey on vocals, Scotty Powers on drums, Dimitri Medevev (d. 2012) on bass, Mark Linskey on guitar and Shadwick Wilde on guitar. This group recorded two songs for a split EP with the band Keyside Strike, which Koi Records released as Koi Records Split Vol. 5.

In 2012, Skinflint Records released the Iron Cross EP Est. 1980.

== "Crucified" ==
In the mid 1980s, New York hardcore band Agnostic Front began covering "Crucified", a song from the Iron Cross EP Skinhead Glory. Agnostic Front included studio versions of the song on their Liberty and Justice For... and Something's Gotta Give albums. Grey's lyrics refer to being ridiculed for being different, being blamed for society's ills, being accused of violence, and to intolerance because of the actions of others. In a 1984 interview Grey described the intolerance he faced in D.C. for being white:

I mean everybody calls you a fucking nazi and they're the ones who are racist against us. I don't hold a grudge against anyone until they start it.

The metaphor of being crucified resonated with Communist, anarchist, and apolitical skinheads who were sick of being labeled as neo-Nazis. White Power sympathizers and fascists who called themselves skinheads also identified with the song due to backlash they received for their reactionary and racist ideology. "Crucified" has become an anthem for both factions of skinheads worldwide. Live audiences have taken to adding a chant of "skinhead army!" to the chorus, a line not included in the band's original recording.

== Discography ==
=== EPs ===
- Skinhead Glory (1982), Dischord Records, Skinflint Records
- Hated and Proud (1983), Skinflint Records
- Koi Records Split Vol. 5 (2009, split with Keyside Strike), Koi Records
- Est. 1980 (2012), Skinflint Records

=== Compilations ===
- Crucified For Our Sins (1999), Lost And Found Records
- Live for Now! (2001), GMM Records
- Two Piece and a Biscuit (2007, split with Sab Grey and The Royal Americans), 13th State Records, Teenage Heart Records
