= Riot, Riot, Upstart =

Studio album by Agnostic Front
- Released: September 7, 1999
- Studios: Big Blue Meenie Studios, Jersey City, New Jersey
- Genre: Hardcore punk
- Length: 29:11
- Label: Epitaph
- Producer: Lars Frederiksen

Agnostic Front chronology
Something's Gotta Give (1998)	Riot, Riot, Upstart (1999)	Unity (1999)

Professional ratings
Review scores
Source	Rating
AllMusic	3/5 stars

Riot, Riot Upstart is the sixth full-length studio album from New York hardcore band Agnostic Front. It was released in September 1999 on Epitaph Records and is the follow-up to the band's Something's Gotta Give album released the previous year. Riot, Riot, Upstart was produced by Lars Frederiksen of fellow punk band, Rancid, and the title track appeared on a volume of Epitaph Records' Punk-O-Rama compilation series.

== Track listing ==
No.	Title	Length
1.	"Police State"	1:03
2.	"I Had Enough"	1:37
3.	"Riot, Riot, Upstart"	2:12
4.	"Sit and Watch"	1:51
5.	"Blood, Death and Taxes"	1:22
6.	"Frustration"	1:19
7.	"Sickness"	1:32
8.	"Shadows"	1:40
9.	"Nowhere to Go"	2:45
10.	"Trust"	2:11
11.	"My Life"	2:16
12.	"It's Time"	1:29
13.	"Rock Star"	1:34
14.	"Nothing's Free"	1:45
15.	"Price You Pay"	0:55
16.	"Jailbreak"	1:36
17.	"Bullet on Mott St."	2:04
Total length:		29:11

== Personnel ==
Agnostic Front

- Roger Miret – vocals
- Vinnie Stigma – guitars
- Rob Kabula – bass
- Jim Colletti – drums

Production

- Recorded at Big Blue Meenie Studios, Jersey City, New Jersey
- Produced by Lars Frederiksen
- Engineered by Tim Gilles

== Trivia ==
- The editing for the "Riot Riot Upstart" music video was done by the same editor who worked on the Brady Bunch title sequence. This explains the segregated screen effect which is used several times in the video.
