= Roger Miret =

American singer and musician

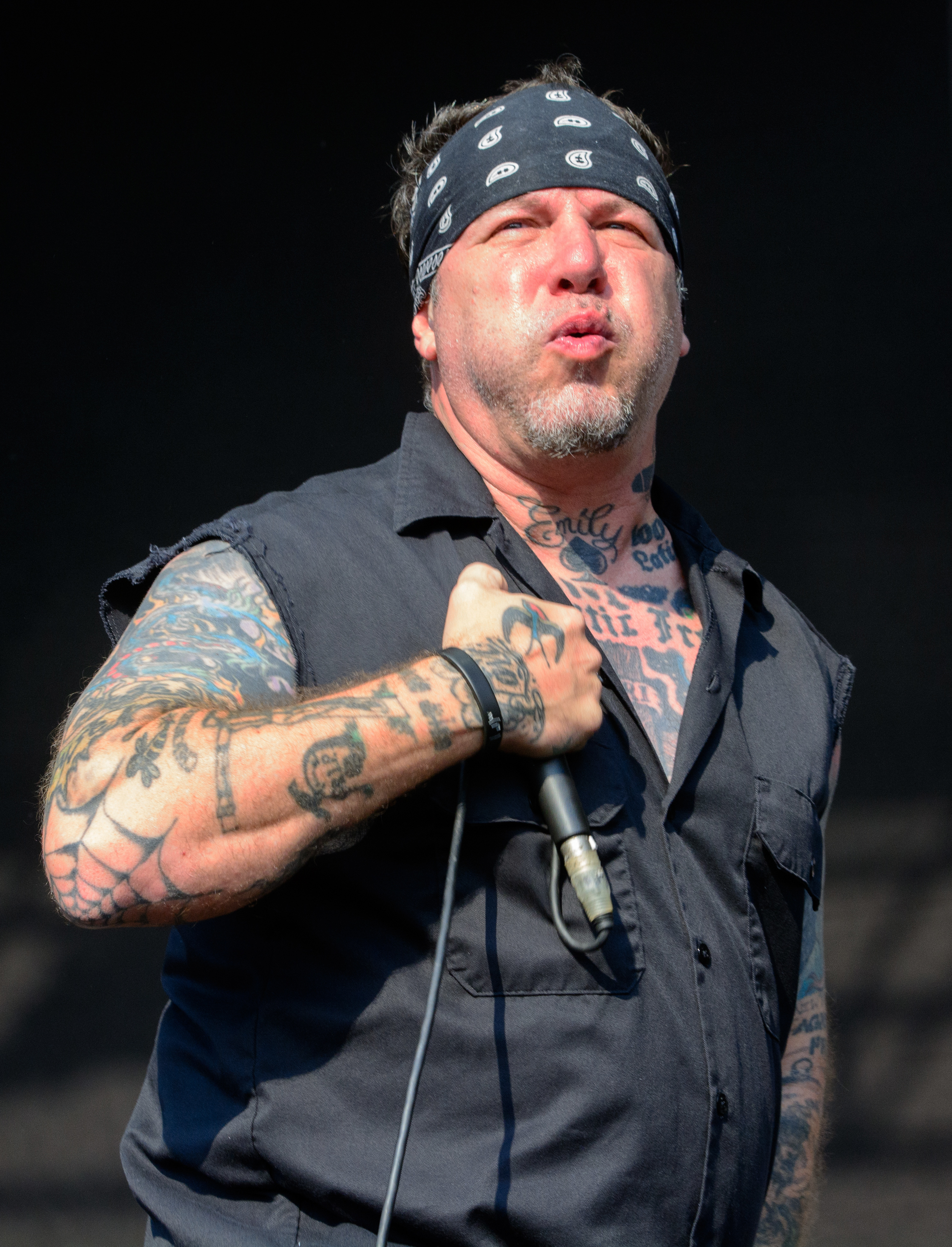
- Miret with Agnostic Front in 2016

Background information
- Also known as: Roger Psycho
- Born: Rogelio de Jesus Miret; June 30, 1964 (age 62); Havana, Cuba
- Origin: New York, U.S.
- Genres: New York hardcore; hardcore punk; punk rock; crossover thrash
- Occupations: Singer; musician; songwriter
- Instruments: Vocals; guitar; bass (early)
- Years active: 1982–present
- Member of: Agnostic Front; Roger Miret and the Disasters; The Alligators
- Formerly of: Madball; the Psychos; Cro-Mags

Rogelio de Jesus Miret (born June 30, 1964) is a Cuban American musician. He is the vocalist for New York hardcore band Agnostic Front, street punk group Roger Miret and the Disasters, and hardcore band The Alligators. In 1983, he briefly played bass in the Cro-Mags.

Agnostic Front are considered to be "the godfathers of hardcore" and one of the bands that created the New York scene. Revolver Magazine stated that he and his bandmate Vinnie Stigma "carried the torch for punk's unapologetic cousin, hardcore, across the globe."

== Early life ==
Miret was born in Havana, Cuba to mother Alicia and father Rogelio. Miret and his family fled Cuba to escape the Castro regime. They came to the United States in 1968 and settled in New York before moving to New Jersey. Miret was one of three children growing up. Soon after, Miret’s father, who was still in Cuba, was shot by anti-Castro freedom fighters; however, he was able to survive. Miret later stated that his father never recovered from his time in the military which resulted in him having insomnia and PTSD. His mother worked at a local meat packing plant but struggled to pay rent which resulted in Miret having to move around a lot during his youth. After two years, Miret’s father finally joined the rest of the family in America. He was abusive towards Miret’s mother, however Miret stated he was never abusive to him or any of his siblings. Miret’s father was eventually arrested during following an abuse domestic incident and his mother shortly after remarried his stepfather; together they had Miret’s half-brother Freddy Cricien.

Miret grew up listening to Hispanic music, and R&B like the Jackson 5. He later got introduced to heavier music during a trip to his cousins' house where he first heard the Sex Pistols. From here Miret began attending punk and hardcore shows in New York regularly.

== Career ==
Prior to joining Agnostic Front, Miret played bass for The Psychos, who claimed in a 1984 interview that Miret was replaced due to the fact that Miret became "more devoted" to Agnostic Front and therefore "couldn't make rehearsals and so forth."

=== Agnostic Front ===
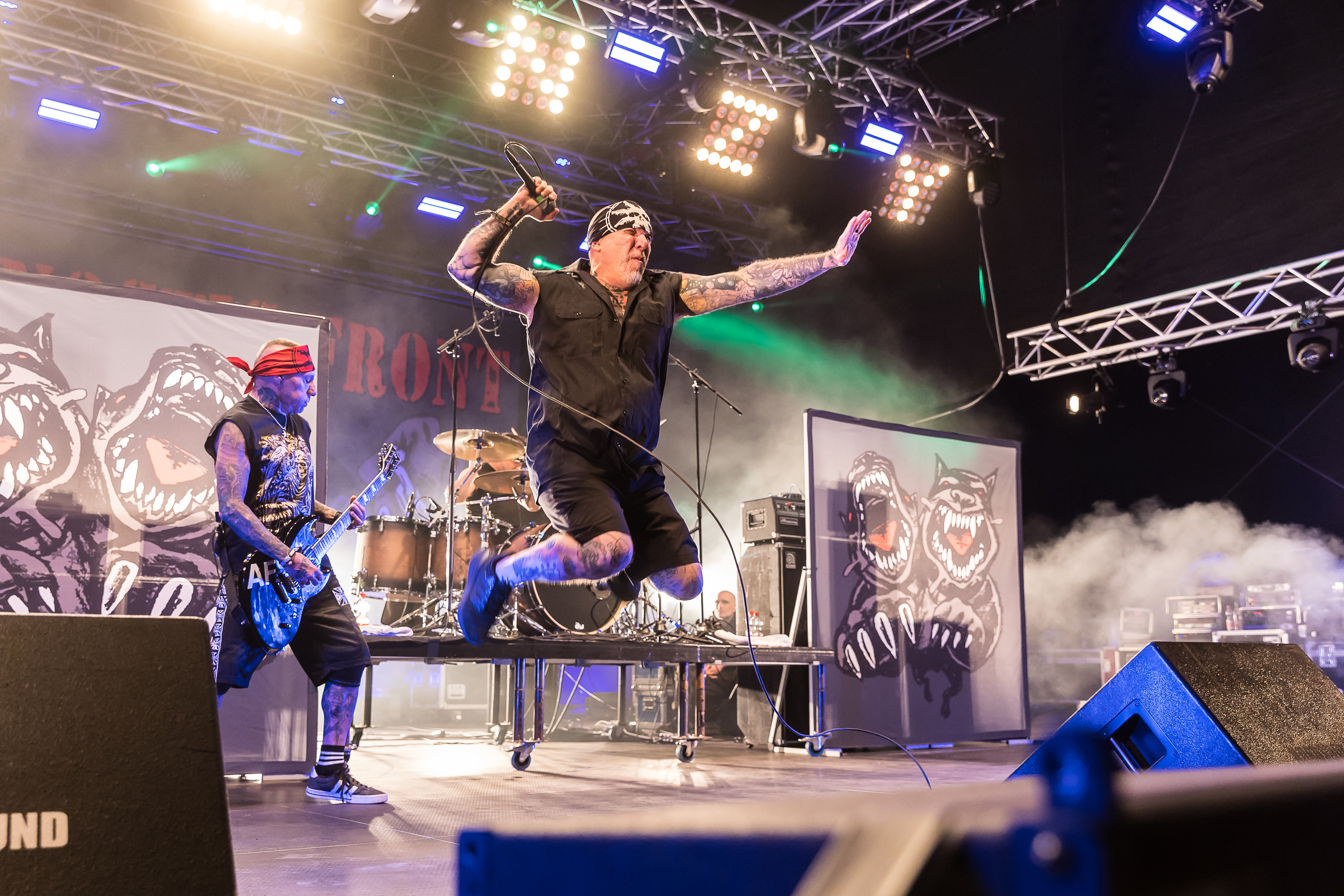
Miret performing with Agnostic Front in 2024

Although never having spoken to him before, founder of Agnostic Front Vinnie Stigma told some of his friends to ask Miret if he wanted to be the vocalist of Agnostic Front, because he liked his style of slam dancing. Miret accepted the offer. Then in 1983 the group recorded and released their debut their EP United Blood. This was then followed by their debut album, Victim in Pain (1984), which is regarded as a seminal New York hardcore release. Eduardo Rivadavia of AllMusic dubbed it "the ultimate document of the New York hardcore scene." The group’s second effort Cause for Alarm was released in 1986 and has been described as a “essential piece to the history of crossover music”. The group then temporarily disbanded later that year in an attempted to oust Joe Montanaro, Miret and Vinnie Stigma formed a new incarnation of AF over the summer of 1987 and later released Liberty and Justice For. In 1989 Miret was incarcerated on a drug charge spending almost two years in jail being released in September 1990 after the charges were overturned. The lyrics, written by Miret while incarcerated, formed most of Agnostic Front's 1992 album One Voice. Miret later stated "Those songs told the story of my life. That was pretty damn cool for that reason." At the beginning of a European tour in October 1990, Miret was refused entry to Belgium as he didn't have a valid visa; the band continued the tour, with roadie Mike Shost stepping in as temporary vocalist. During the subsequent touring cycle, Miret was temporarily replaced by his younger brother (and Madball bandmate) Freddy Cricien for a string of shows in July, while he underwent surgery to treat an inguinal hernia. The band's supposed last show was at CBGB on December 20, 1992. The show was recorded for the live album Last Warning which was released by Roadrunner Records in 1993.

However Merit claimed the band never officially broke up stating:

“We never really broke up. We just took a break. I'm a father and I felt like I needed to spend more time with my daughter. During that time, I became better at what I do. I became a better technician. When I knew it was time, I got together with [guitarist] Vinnie [Stigma] and it sounded right.”

Stigma and Miret reformed Agnostic Front in May 1996 and did a few reunion shows in December 1996 since then the band has toured continuously and has released another 9 records with the most recent being Echoes in Eternity (2025).

=== Madball ===
During the early 1980s when Miret’s younger brother Freddy Criciens was seven years old, he visited with Miret in New York City and he began to perform on stage with Agnostic Front, singing a few songs which would become a staple of their shows during this period. Shortly after, he began to join the band on tour. During this time he became the group’s unofficial mascot and was given the name “Agnostic Fred”.

This culminated in Madball being formed in 1988 and featured most of Agnostic Front's members. Madball consisted of Miret on bass, Vinnie Stigma on guitar, Will Shepler on drums, and then Miret’s 12-year-old brother Freddy Cricien, as the vocalist. The group originally played unused Agnostic Front songs however in 1989 they released their first EP Ball of Destruction. Miret stayed in the band till 1992 recording their second EP Droppin' Many Suckers then officially leaving the band.

=== Roger Miret and the Disasters ===
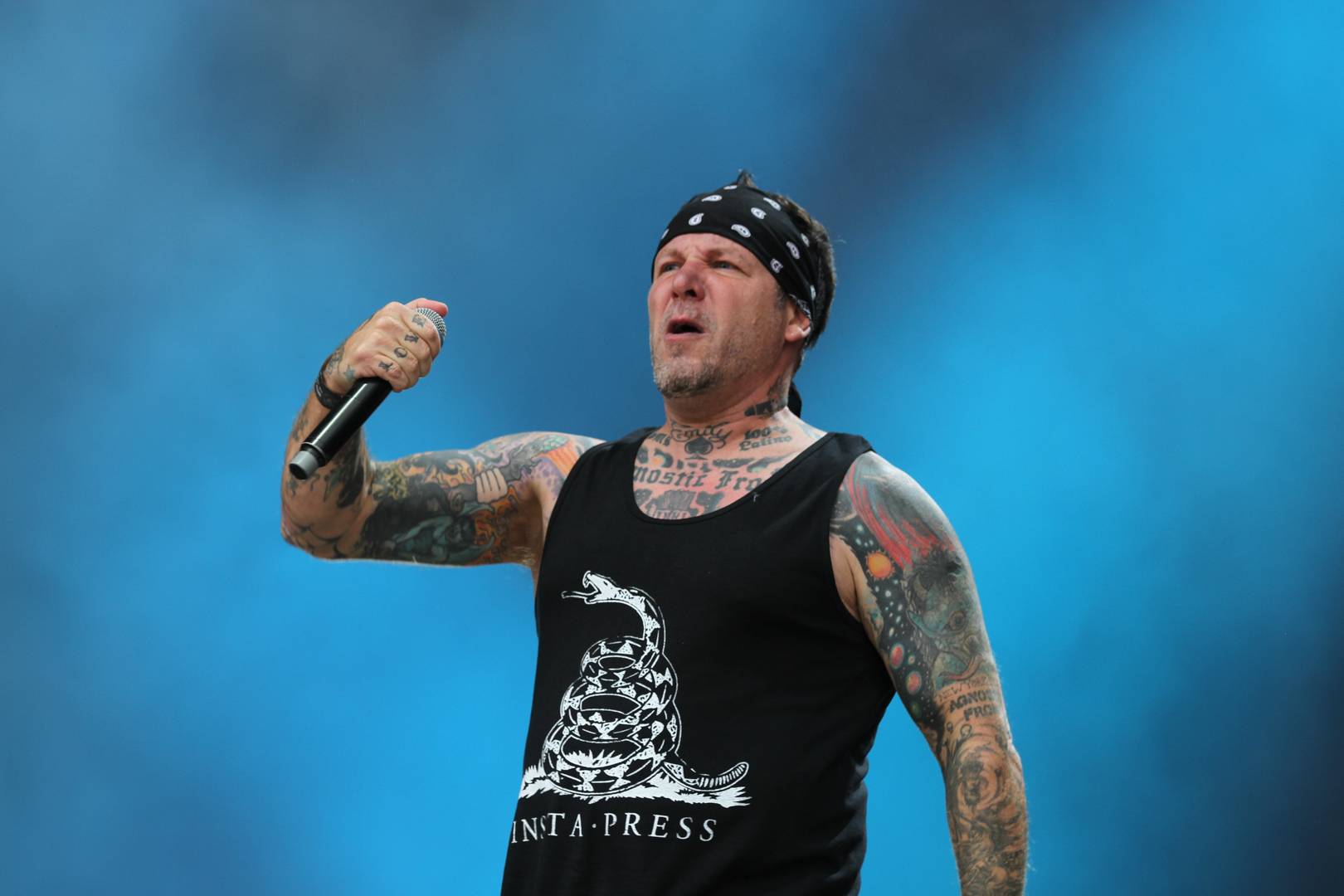
Miret in 2013

In 1999 Miret started a side project called Roger Miret and the Disasters. The band started when Miret was writing songs that were not a style suitable for Lady Luck (a band fronted by his ex-wife Denise) or Agnostic Front, so he started recording them on his own on a Boss recorder. Originally ment to be a solo project Johnny Rioux had previously mentioned he would like to work with him, so Rioux helped Then Miret met Rhys Kill, who liked the material and joined in on the project. The band then recorded a demo tape, with Miret and Kill on guitar, Rioux on bass and Matt Kelly from the Dropkick Murphys on drums. That six-song demo found reviewed by Lars Frederiksen, who passed it off to his Rancid bandmate Tim Armstrong. He asked Miret to put his project out on Hellcat Records. As Kelly could not continue with Miret due to his commitments with Dropkick Murphys, Miret asked Johnny Kray of The Krays and New York Rel-X to join. Their debut their self-titled album was released in 2002 and they have since released three more with the most recent being Gotta Get More (2011).

In a 2019 interview Miret stated that there were new songs written for the Disasters however he wanted to remain focused on Agnostic Fronts album Get Loud! which came around the same time.

=== The Alligators ===
The Alligators is another one of Miret’s side projects that he started during the 2000s, collaborating with Rich Labatte and Steve Larson of the Southern California band Insted. The band has a vintage old school hardcore sound and are heavily influenced by bands like SSD, Antidote, Negative Approach, Poison Idea and Scream. They released two EPs You Ruined Everything (2006) and a self titled (2008). A compilation album of these two Eps we’re later released in 2012 alongside a few new songs titled Time's Up You're Dead. The group went on hiatus for 13 years before releasing a third Ep Revelation Of The Method in 2025.

== Musical style and influences ==
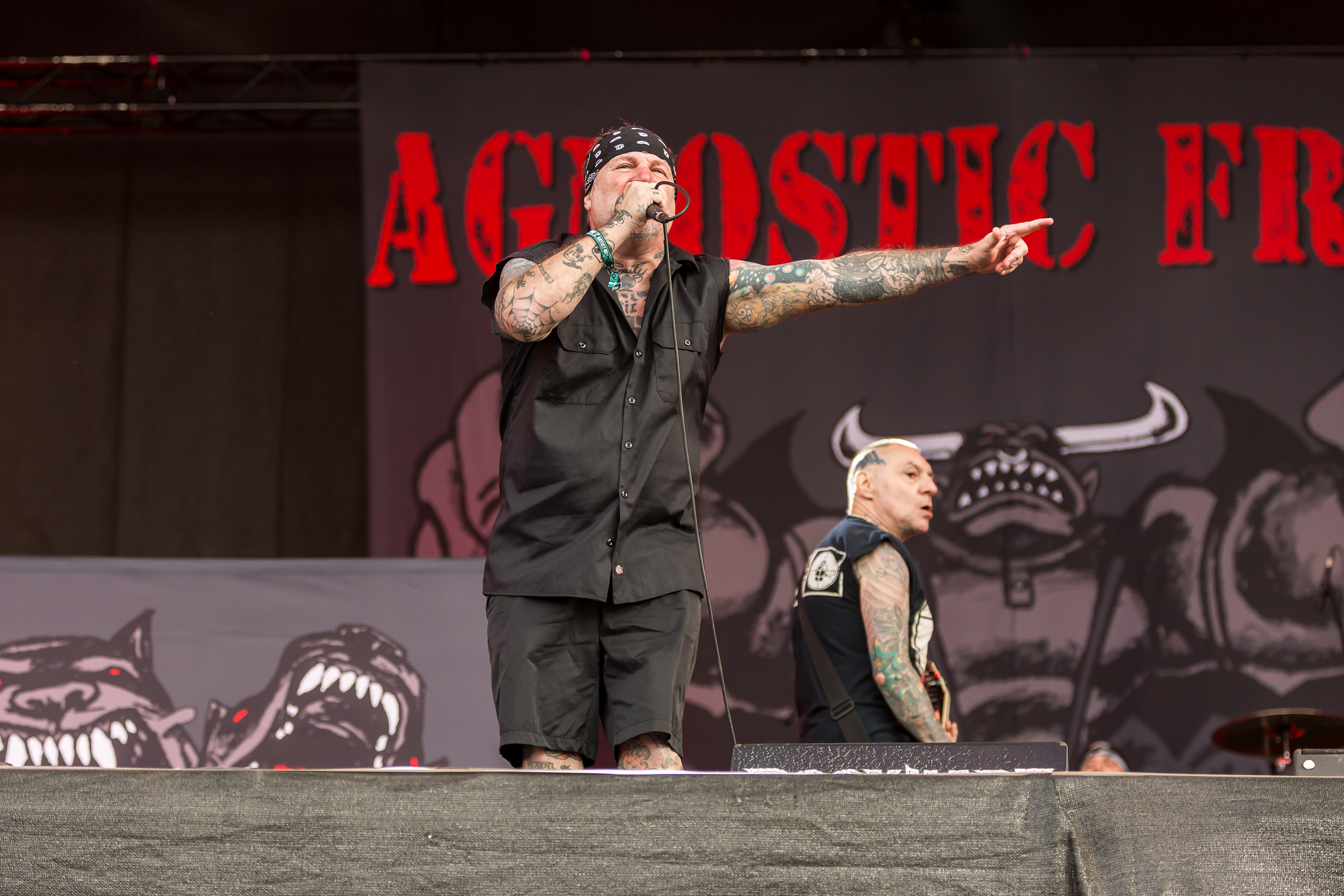
Miret performing in 2022

Most of Miret’s lyrical themes in Agnostic Front focus on unity, political and social issues, along with criticizing government corruption. In a 2023 interview with Blabbermouth.net Miret commented on tackling societal and political issues in their music stating “The thing is, especially with Agnostic Front, we live that life too. We speak about oppression and overcoming oppression, and people can relate to that, whether they're oppressed by the government or at home or whatever. And then they see that we're genuine, we're real and they could relate to us.” However for his band Roger Miret and the Disasters the lyrics were more personal and reflected on his past.

His vocal style is a combination of the deep vocals of British Oi! and the shouting typical of hardcore, which sounds very vicious, especially on the early albums. The only time he went away with this was on Cause for Alarm where he experimented with a higher, more metal-influenced voice.

He has also mentioned he needs to feel the music before writing lyrics adding “I have to feel the music, like if they're writing something and if I'm liking it, I'll let them know, and if I don't like it, it's out.” Adding "I like to write, scribble stuff, and I don't write a whole song until I'm ready to write a whole song. Basically, I hear the music and I hear a line, and then I go from there. It's never deliberately, I have all these lyrics and I have to make all these lyrics fit in this song — it doesn't work that way. It has to really mean something to me."

Miret’s influences all come directly from early punk bands, including The Clash, Ramones, Dead Kennedys, Black Flag, Circle Jerks, The GeMirets and Minor Threat.

== Personal life ==
In a 2011 interview, Miret commented on his 1989 arrests stating that he became involved in the drug trade because he was living in poverty, squatting buildings, and his then-partner was pregnant. After being released, he started supporting PETA campaigns, as well as other non-profit organizations, and followed a vegetarian diet for many years. In 2008, he said he no longer smoked or used drugs, except for an occasional drink. Miret resides in Scottsdale, Arizona, He has an interest in working on and building vintage cars, and also enjoys listening to Johnny Cash and jazz. During Agnostic Front’s hiatus in the mid 1990s Miret went to the Motorcycle Mechanics Institute in Florida and became a Harley-Davidson mechanic. Miret’s first wife was Amy Keim who was lead singer for Nausea, the two had one daughter together but eventually separated. Miret is currently married to his wife Emily, the couple have two children together. In 2025 Miret became a grandfather.

In September 2021, Miret revealed that he was diagnosed with cancer earlier in that year. However, after a lengthy hospital stay and surgery, the cancer is now in remission. A GoFundMe page was launched to help Miret pay for his medical bills. Miret went under successful surgery to remove the cancer and is now in complete remission and all signs of cancer have disappeared.

== Other work ==
Miret has also worked as a record producer with his first work coming on Agnostic Front's 1998 album Something’s Gotta Give, he has since worked with other hardcore acts and helped produce other Agnostic Front albums. In 2012, Onno Cro-Mag (real name: Onno van Ravensteijn; d. 2013) from Aardschok magazine of the Netherlands and Miret started the hardcore music record label Strength Records.

With Jon Wiederhorn, Miret released My Riot: Agnostic Front, Grit, Guts & Glory in August 2017. The autobiography chronicles Miret's career as the vocalist of Agnostic Front as well as his upbringing; it focuses on Miret's trials and tribulations growing up in 1980s New York City. That same year Miret along with his fellow Agnostic Front bandmate Vinnie Stigma appeared in a documentary about the band titled, The Godfathers of Hardcore, directed by Ian McFarland.

In 2025 Miret released his second book Agnostic Front - With Time, the comprehensive visual archives of Roger Miret, the book includes early and unseen photos and art from the band along with a tour diary which chroniclined their first US tour supporting their 1984 album Victim In Pain.

Miret has also worked as a tour guide at the Punk Rock Museum on multiple occasions.

== Discography ==
=== With Agnostic Front ===
- United Blood (1983)
- Victim in Pain (1984)
- Cause for Alarm (1986)
- Liberty and Justice For... (1987)
- Live at CBGB (1989)
- One Voice (1992)
- Last Warning (1993)
- Something's Gotta Give (1998)
- Riot, Riot, Upstart (1999)
- Dead Yuppies (2001)
- Another Voice (2004)
- Warriors (2007)
- My Life My Way (2011)
- The American Dream Died (2015)
- Get loud! (2019)
- Echoes in Eternity (2025)

=== With Madball ===
- Ball of Destruction (1989)
- Droppin' Many Suckers (1992)

=== With Roger Miret and the Disasters ===
- Roger Miret and the Disasters (2002)
- 1984 (2005)
- My Riot (2006)
- Gotta Get Up Now (2011)

=== The Alligators ===
- You Ruined Everything (2006)
- The Alligators (2008)
- Time's Up, You're Dead (2012)
- Revelation Of The Method (2025)

== Production discography ==
Year	Artist	Work	Role
1998	Agnostic Front	Something’s Gotta Give	Co-Producer
1998	Under The Gun	Nowhere To Run	Co-Producer
1999	Indecision	Release The Cure	Producer
1999	Reinforce	Happy Teenagers Do Not Paint Their Rooms Black!	Producer
2000	Madball	Hold It Down	Executive Producer
2000	Shutdown	Few And Far Between	Producer
2001	The Turbo A.C.'s	Fuel For Life	Producer
2001	Agnostic Front	Dead Yuppies	Producer
2002	Roger Miret and the Disasters	Roger Miret and the Disasters	Producer
2002	On The Rise	Burning Inside	Executive Producer
2002	Clearview 77	Absent Company	Producer, Tracks 12 — 14
2002	The Krays	A Time For Action	Producer
2003	The Turbo A.C.'s	Winner Take All	Co-producer
2006	Roger Miret and the Disasters	My Riot	Producer
2019	Agnostic Front	Get Loud!	Producer
