= One Voice (Agnostic Front album) =

Studio album by Agnostic Front
- Released: 1992
- Recorded: 1991
- Studio: Normandy Sound
- Genre: Crossover thrash, hardcore punk
- Length: 32:10
- Label: Relativity, Roadrunner
- Producer: Don Fury

Agnostic Front chronology
| Live at CBGB (1989) | One Voice (1992) | Last Warning (1993) |

Professional ratings
Review scores
| Source | Rating |
|---|---|
| AllMusic | 2/5 stars |

One Voice is the fourth full-length studio album from New York hardcore band Agnostic Front. It was released in 1992 on Relativity Records. It marks a three-year absence from recording – the last album was Live at CBGB in 1989 – after Roger Miret's term of imprisonment. However, the comeback was short-lived as after Last Warning (another live album), the band split up and did not record again until 1998.

Musically, the band continued their lean towards crossover thrash which earned the interest of Roadrunner Records who distributed this and their next album under license. After a three-year lay off, two line-up changes had taken place – Matt Henderson replacing Steve Martin on guitar, and Craig Setari replacing Alan Peters on Bass.

The front cover photo is from the Attica Prison riot event as well as the man's voice heard in the intro to the song "New Jack". The album's concept revolves around prison, which was very familiar to vocalist Roger Miret due to him being imprisoned before this album.

== Track listing ==
| No. | Title | Music | Length |
|---|---|---|---|
| 1. | "New Jack" | Matt Henderson, Roger Miret | 3:40 |
| 2. | "One Voice" | Henderson, Miret, Craig Setari | 3:15 |
| 3. | "Infiltrate" | Henderson, Setari | 1:20 |
| 4. | "The Tombs" | Henderson, Miret, Setari | 3:23 |
| 5. | "Your Fall" | Henderson, Miret | 1:47 |
| 6. | "Over the Edge" | Henderson, Miret, Setari | 3:55 |
| 7. | "Undertow" | Henderson, Miret | 3:36 |
| 8. | "Now & Then" | Henderson, Miret, Setari | 2:24 |
| 9. | "Crime Without Sin" | Miret | 2:41 |
| 10. | "Retaliate" | Henderson, Miret | 3:20 |
| 11. | "Force Feed" | Henderson, Miret, Setari | 2:49 |
| 12. | "Bastard" | Miret | 3:08 |
| Total length: | | | 32:10 |

== Personnel ==
Agnostic Front

- Roger Miret – vocals
- Vinnie Stigma – lead guitar
- Matt Henderson – rhythm guitar
- Craig Setari – bass
- Will Shepler – drums

Production

- Armand Majidi – backing vocals
- Jamie Locke – piano
- Produced by Don Fury
- Engineered and mixed by Jamie Locke
- Assistant engineered by Joe Pires
