= Sick of It All discography =

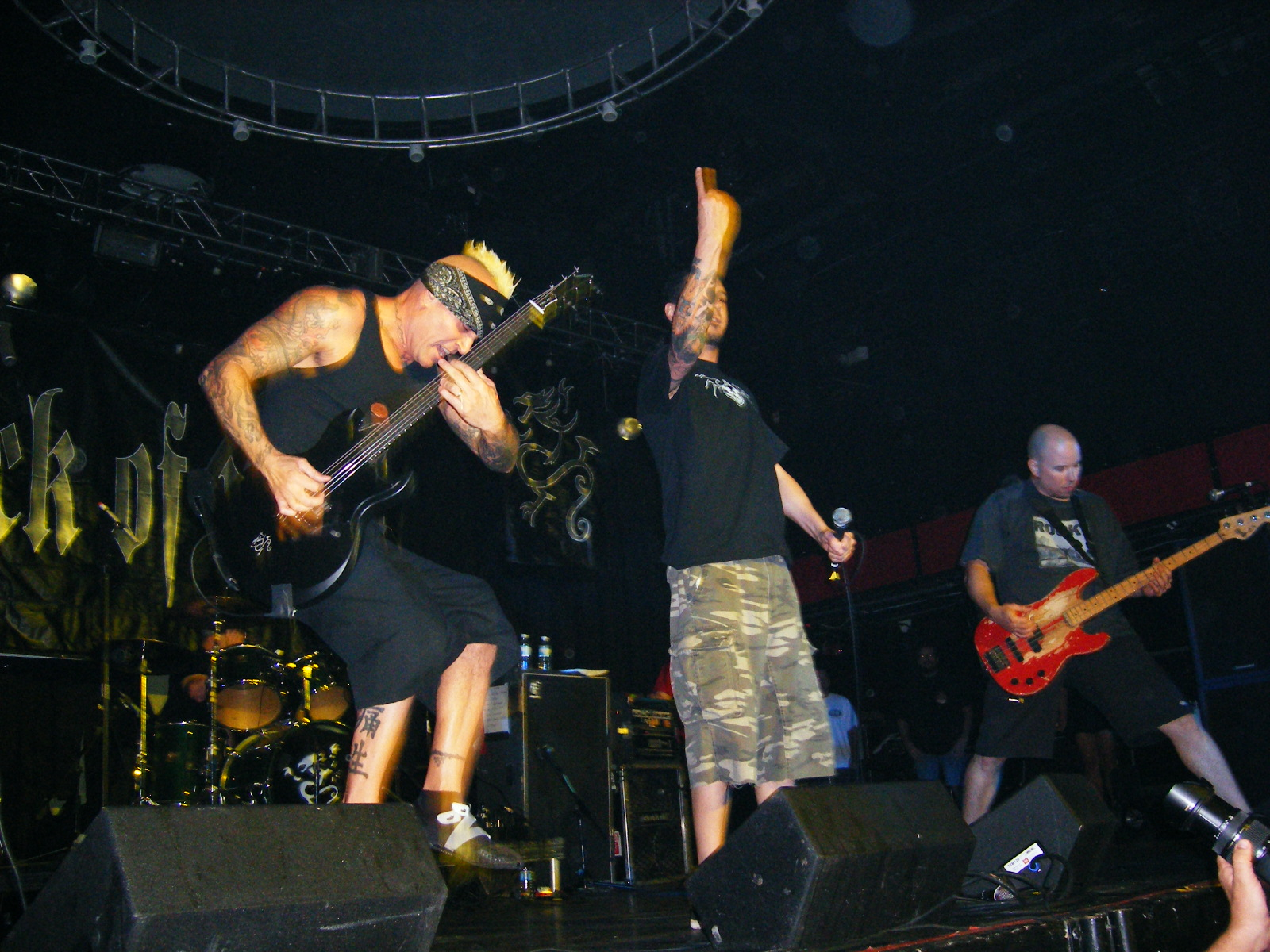
- Sick of It All on their 20th Anniversary Tour in 2006
- Studio albums: 12
- Extended plays: 2
- Live albums: 2
- Compilation albums: 2
- Singles: 6
- Video albums: 1

Sick of It All is a New York hardcore band formed in 1986 and currently consists of brothers Lou Koller (vocals) and Pete Koller (guitar), Armand Majidi (drums) and Craig Setari (bass guitar). In the 40 years since its inception, the band has released twelve studio albums, two live recordings, two compilation albums, two EPs, six singles and one documentary film.

After recording a demo in 1987 and playing Sunday afternoon matinees at the famous CBGB's, Sick of It All signed a record contract with Revelation Records, who released a self-titled 7-inch EP. In 1988, the band terminated their contract with Revelation and signed with the now-defunct Relativity Records, who released their first two studio albums as well as a live EP. In 1993, they ended their five-year tenure with Relativity and signed with East West Records. In 1998, Sick of It All terminated their U.S. record contract for the fourth time and signed with Fat Wreck Chords. Around 2005, they ended their seven-year tenure with Fat Wreck and signed to Abacus Recordings, who released one album for the band before the label went bankrupt; they would remain signed to Abacus' parent label Century Media, until 2018 when they resigned to Fat Wreck Chords.

== Studio albums ==
List of studio albums, with selected chart positions
| Title | Album details | Peak chart positions | | | | | | | | Sales |
| Title | Album details | US Heat. | AUT | BEL (FL) | BEL (WA) | FRA | GER | NLD | SWI | Sales |
|---|---|---|---|---|---|---|---|---|---|---|
| Blood, Sweat, and No Tears | Released: June 26, 1989; Label: Relativity; Format: CD, CS, LP | — | — | — | — | — | — | — | — | WW: 100,000 |
| Just Look Around | Released: October 6, 1992; Label: Relativity; Format: CD, CS, LP | — | — | — | — | — | — | — | — | WW: 100,000 |
| Scratch the Surface | Released: October 18, 1994; Label: EastWest; Format: CD, CS, LP | — | — | — | — | — | 67 | — | — | WW: 250,000 |
| Built to Last | Released: February 11, 1997; Label: EastWest/Equal Vision; Format: CD, CS, LP | 32 | — | — | — | — | — | 56 | — | |
| Call to Arms | Released: February 23, 1999; Label: Fat Wreck Chords; Format: CD, CS, LP | — | — | — | — | — | 84 | — | — | |
| Yours Truly | Released: November 21, 2000; Label: Fat Wreck Chords; Format: CD, LP | — | — | — | — | — | — | — | — | |
| Life on the Ropes | Released: September 9, 2003; Label: Fat Wreck Chords; Format: CD, LP | — | — | — | — | — | — | — | — | |
| Death to Tyrants | Released: April 18, 2006; Label: Abacus/Century Media; Format: CD, LP | — | — | — | — | — | — | — | — | |
| Based on a True Story | Released: April 20, 2010; Label: Century Media; Format: CD, LP | 30 | — | 95 | — | 162 | 40 | — | — | |
| XXV Nonstop | Released: November 1, 2011; Label: Century Media; Format: CD, LP | — | — | — | — | — | — | — | — | |
| The Last Act of Defiance | Released: September 29, 2014; Label: Century Media; Format: CD, LP | 17 | — | 79 | 148 | 179 | 92 | — | 98 | |
| Wake the Sleeping Dragon! | Released: November 2, 2018; Label: Fat Wreck Chords/Century Media; Format: CD, LP | 17 | 65 | 94 | 99 | — | 31 | — | 51 | |
| "—" denotes a recording that did not chart or was not released in that territory. | | | | | | | | | | |

== EPs/singles ==
| Year | Title | Label | Format | Other information |
|---|---|---|---|---|
| 1987 | Sick of It All | Revelation Records | CD/LP | Originally released in 1987 as a 7-inch EP; A CD release of this EP did not appear until 1997, ten years after its release |
| 1991 | "We Stand Alone" | Relativity Records | CD/7" | Currently out of print; Contains versions of "'We Stand Alone" and "What's Going On" recorded previous to the Just Look Around sessions and a studio cover of Minor Threat's "Betray"; Contains live material from Blood, Sweat, and No Tears and the self-titled EP |
| 1994 | "Step Down" | East West Records | CD | Promo single that came out shortly before Scratch The Surface album; Contains tracks: "Step Down", "Borstal Breakout", "Straight Ahead". They were later released on Outtakes for the Outcast. |
| 1996 | "Cool as a Mustache" | East West Records | CD | Single given away for radios containing one unreleased track called 86 (later released on Outtakes for the Outcast |
| 1999 | "Potential for a Fall" | Fat Wreck Chords | CD/7" | Single |
| 2000 | "Us Vs. Them" | East West Records | CD | Single given away on Warped Tour and other Sick of It All shows; contains "Us Vs. Them" (version as on Built to Last) and seven live songs. |
| 2000 | "Maladjusted" | Mercury Records | CD | Single released only in Germany. Contains "Maladjusted" (version as on Built to Last) and three live songs. |
| 2003 | "Relentless" | Bridge Nine | CD/7-inch | Single |
| 2016 | When the Smoke Clears | Century Media | EP | Contains illustrated book |

== Other releases ==
| Year | Title | Label | Format | Other information |
|---|---|---|---|---|
| 1995 | Live in a World Full of Hate | Lost & Found | CD/12" Picture Vinyl | Live album |
| 1997 | Spreading the Hardcore Reality | Lost & Found | CD | Compilation album, containing early material |
| 2002 | Live in a Dive | Fat Wreck Chords | CD/LP | This release is part of the Fat Wreck Chords series of Live in a Dive albums |
| 2004 | Outtakes for the Outcast | Fat Wreck Chords | CD | Compilation album, containing unreleased original songs, B-sides, and cover versions; Last release on Fat Wreck Chords |
| 2007 | Our Impact Will Be Felt | Abacus Recordings | CD | Tribute album by various artists dedicated to Sick of It All |

== Guest appearances ==
- Barcode - Course of Action (feat. Lou Koller)
- Born from Pain - Doomsday Clock (feat. Lou Koller)
- CIV - Can't Wait One Minute More (feat. Lou Koller)
- Devil in Me - Back Against The Wall (feat. Lou Koller & Craig Setari, both on vocals)
- Ensign - 15 Years (feat. Lou Koller)
- H_{2}O - Fairweather Friend (feat. Lou Koller and Kevin Seconds of 7 Seconds)
- H_{2}O - What Happened? (feat. Lou Koller and Matt Skiba of Alkaline Trio)
- King Ly Chee - Lost in a World (feat. Lou Koller)
- Mobb Deep - Survival of the Fittest (feat. Sick of It All)
- Most Precious Blood - It Runs In The Blood (feat. Lou Koller)
- Skarhead - T.C.O.B. (feat. Craig Setari)
- Super Junky Monkey - If (feat. Lou Koller)
- The Bones - I Wanna Be Sedated (Ramones cover) (feat. Lou Koller and Roger Miret of Agnostic Front)
- The Haunted - Who Will Decide (feat. Lou Koller)
- The Warriors - Mankind Screams (feat. Lou Koller)

== Videos ==
- The Story So Far (2001)

== Music videos ==
- "Injustice System"
- "Just Look Around"
- "Scratch the Surface"
- "Step Down"
- "Us vs. Them"
- "Potential for a Fall"
- "District"
- "Relentless"
- "Take the Night Off"
- "Death or Jail"
- "Road Less Traveled"
- "Get Bronx"
