= Pete Koller =

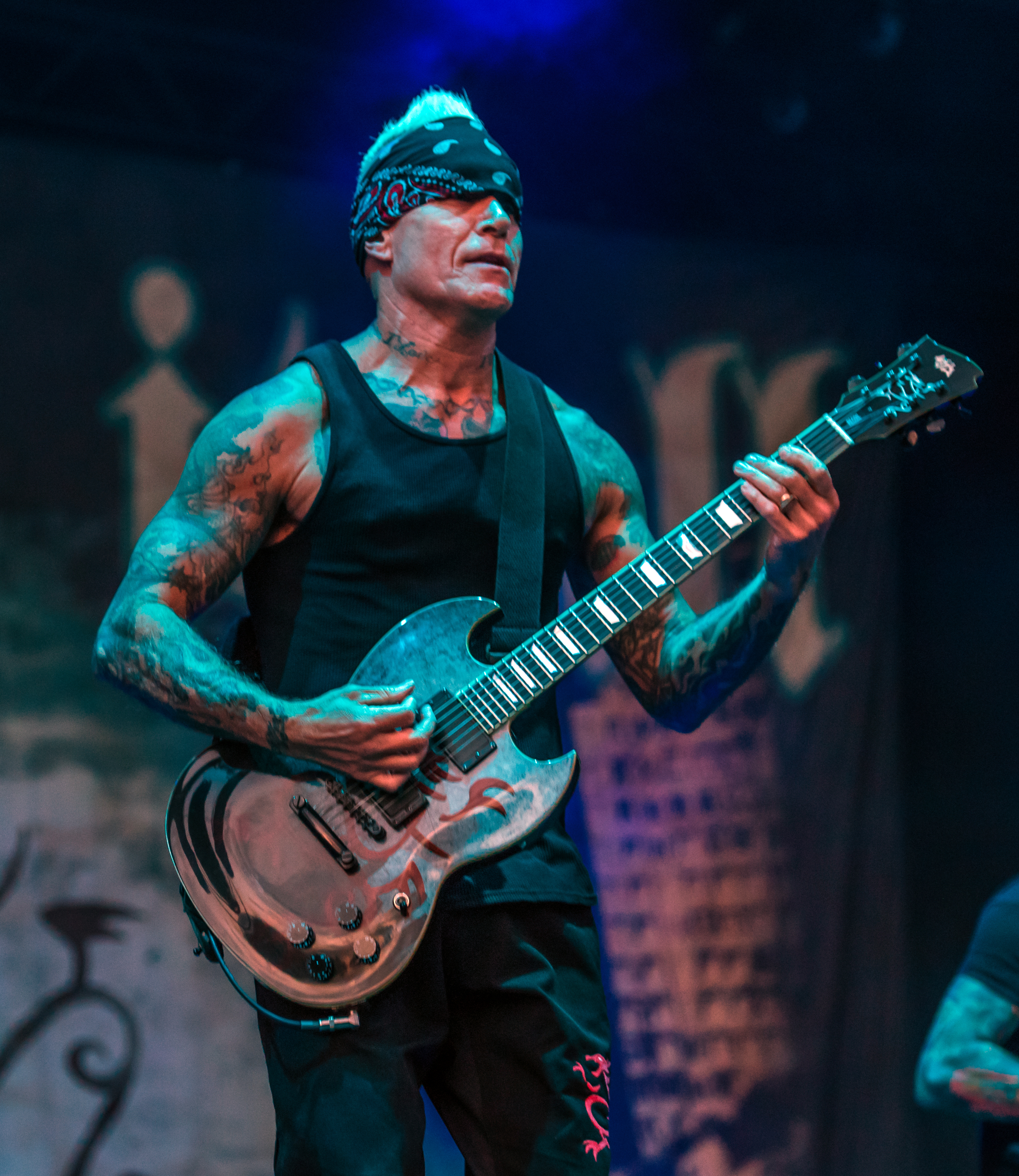
- Koller performing at Reload Festival 2018

Background information
- Born: Pierre Michel Koller; August 5, 1966 (age 60)
- Origin: Queens, New York, U.S.
- Genre: Hardcore punk
- Instrument: Guitar
- Years active: 1986–present
- Member of: Sick of it All

Pierre Michel "Pete" Koller (born August 5, 1966) is an American musician who is a founding member and guitarist of the hardcore band Sick of It All. Koller and his brother Lou have been described as some of the most influential figures in New York City hardcore. As of Lou's death in 2026, Pete is the only remaining original member left in Sick of It All.

== Early life ==
Pete Koller was born and raised in a middle-class family in Queens, New York alongside his three brothers, one of them being future Sick of It All bandmate Lou. Koller first began playing guitar one Christmas when his parents got him an acoustic guitar and a Roy Clark Big Note song book. Growing up Koller listened to a wide variety of music but always leaned towards heavier and faster genres.

During his first year at Francis Lewis High School he got a Gibson SG Special and began to start playing guitar more seriously. He and his brother Lou also started to regularly attend hardcore shows at the CBGB’s. He later stated in an interview "Going there I realized that I could do this too. So with my bar chord I started not learning other bands songs but writing my own songs. Such as “My Life” and “Friends Like You which we still play today in the set."

== Career ==
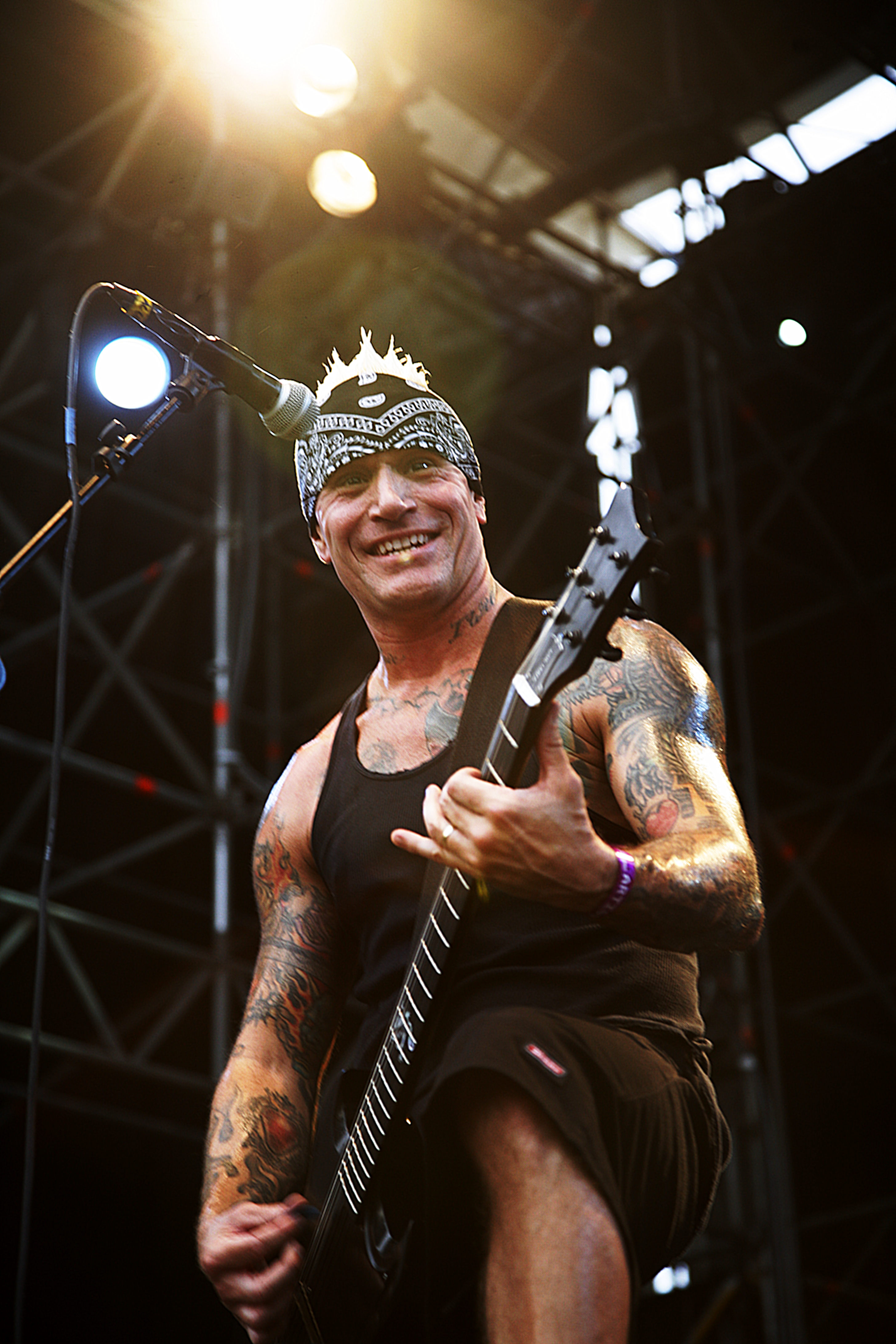
Koller performing at Eurockéennes in 2007

Koller and his brother Lou decided to form a band called Sick of It All in 1986. The initial line up consisted Pete on guitar, his brother Lou playing bass and providing vocals, and David Lamb on drums. Koller and his brother originally wanted the band to be named General Chaos, however Lamb proposed calling the band Sick of All, with the intent to abbreviate it to S.O.A. However Lou had pointed out that another band existed with that name and the group decided to expand the name to Sick of It All. Lou then strictly moved to vocals following bassist Mark McNeely joining the band soon after. Then just after one month of being formed, Sick of It All played their first show on Saturday, May 17, 1986, at the Right Track Inn in Long Island, supporting Youth of Today, Straight Ahead and Crippled Youth. Shortly thereafter, both Lamb and McNeely left the band and were replaced by Armand Majidi and Rich Cipriano respectively.

Koller also created the bands signature dragon logo which was inspired by a drawing the band seen in a flash sheet by tattoo artist Greg Irons. Koller then redesigned the logo for him and a group of friends to get as tattoos in honor of a friend who was joining the marines. The tattoo just happened to appear on the cover of their debut self-titled 1987 EP in became associated with the band from then on.

The group then released their debut self-titled Ep in 1987. Koller and Sick of It All released their first full-length effort in 1989, Blood, Sweat, and No Tears, which is viewed as a landmark record for the hardcore genre. Koller and the band then embarked on their first national tour in support of the album, as both a headliner and supporting act for Bad Brains. They then rose to prominence with their 3rd studio album Scratch the Surface (1994), which went on to sell 250,000 copies worldwide by 1997. Both Koller and his brother credited the album with expanding the bands fanbase in Europe. In 2000, Yours Truly was released, and the following year in 2001, Koller alongside the rest of the band took part in a documentary The Story So Far; the film showed the band's career up to that point, from their beginnings to their unexpected rise to fame. Their seventh album Life on the Ropes was released in 2003. Another album titled Death to Tyrants was released on April 18, 2006. Based on a True Story was then released on April 20, 2010. Four years later, their eleventh album, tilted Last Act of Defiance, was released on September 30, 2014. Their most recent album Wake the Sleeping Dragon! was released on November 2, 2018. This would be the last Sick of It All album to feature Koller's brother Lou on vocals, as he died in 2026 after a two-year battle with cancer, and Pete has since stated that the band will continue in his memory.

In 2018 Koller and his brother announced they were working on an autobiography. three years later in 2021 the book titled The Blood and Sweat: The Story of Sick of It All's Koller Brothers was officially published. The book goes over the two brother's entire lives from childhood to their time in the band, also featuring commentary from other band members past and present. Decibel claimed the book is "One the best books ever written about hardcore".

Koller missed Sick of it All 2022 European tour to undergo surgery for a hernia, Craig Silverman filled in for him on guitar.

== Musicianship and gear ==
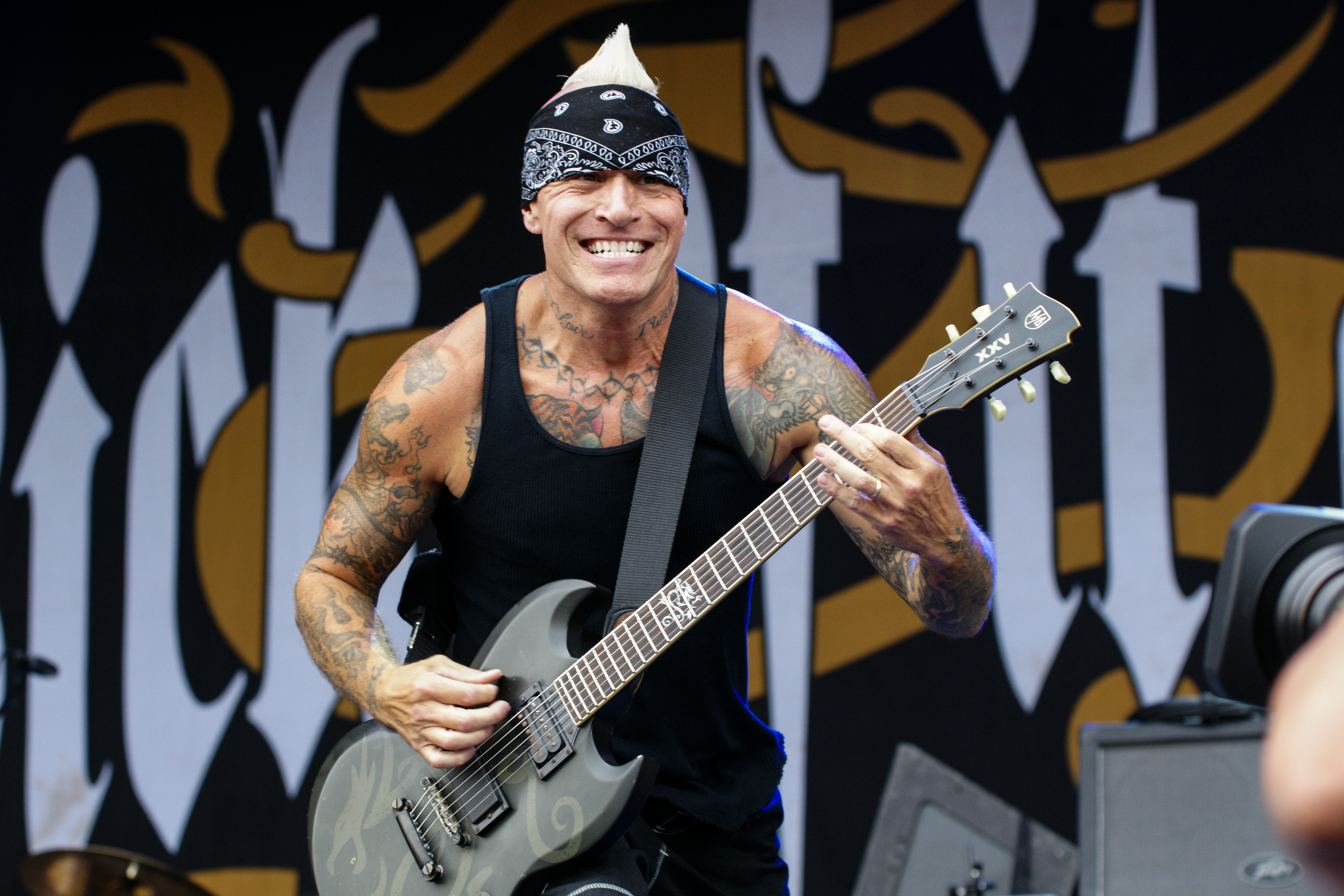
Koller performing in 2014

Koller has stated that some of his influences to play guitar include the Plasmatics and Black Sabbath. During Sick of it All’s live performances Koller is known for high-kicking and his guitar-spinning Tasmanian devil impression. He revealed in a 2024 interview that he stretches and warms up for about an hour before every live performance.

Throughout Sick of it All’s early years Koller would use whatever he could get his hands on stating "What I used back in the day was whatever I could get my hands on and what was cheap and what made the guitar sound more metal." This included a Carvin Head, TC Distortion Box on boost and a Metal Zone from Boss. He now uses ESP Vipers with Fishman Pickups. For his amp he uses an S6505 or 5150 from Peavey and a 550 TC Electronics Amp Worx which he uses with a Boss Noise Gate. His strings are an Ernie Ball Twelve Gauge.

== Personal life ==
Koller is married to his wife Mei-Ling Koller who serves as the guitar tech for Sick Of It All. They have one daughter together named Lucy, he and his family resides in Daytona Beach Florida. Koller has multiple tattoos one of them being the signature Sick of it All dragon.

When the Punk Rock Museum opened in 2023 Koller worked as an official tour guide.

Koller and Sick of It All announced on July 24, 2026 that his brother Lou had passed away following his two year battle with cancer.

=== Martial arts ===
Koller first became introduced to MMA after watching his first UFC event in 1993. He then began to train in Brazilian jiu-jitsu regularly and during the mid 1990s he would even train with the Gracie family in California. He has credited the sport for helping him perform his on stage antics during live shows. Over the years Koller has also added Muay Thai and boxing to his training.

== Discography ==
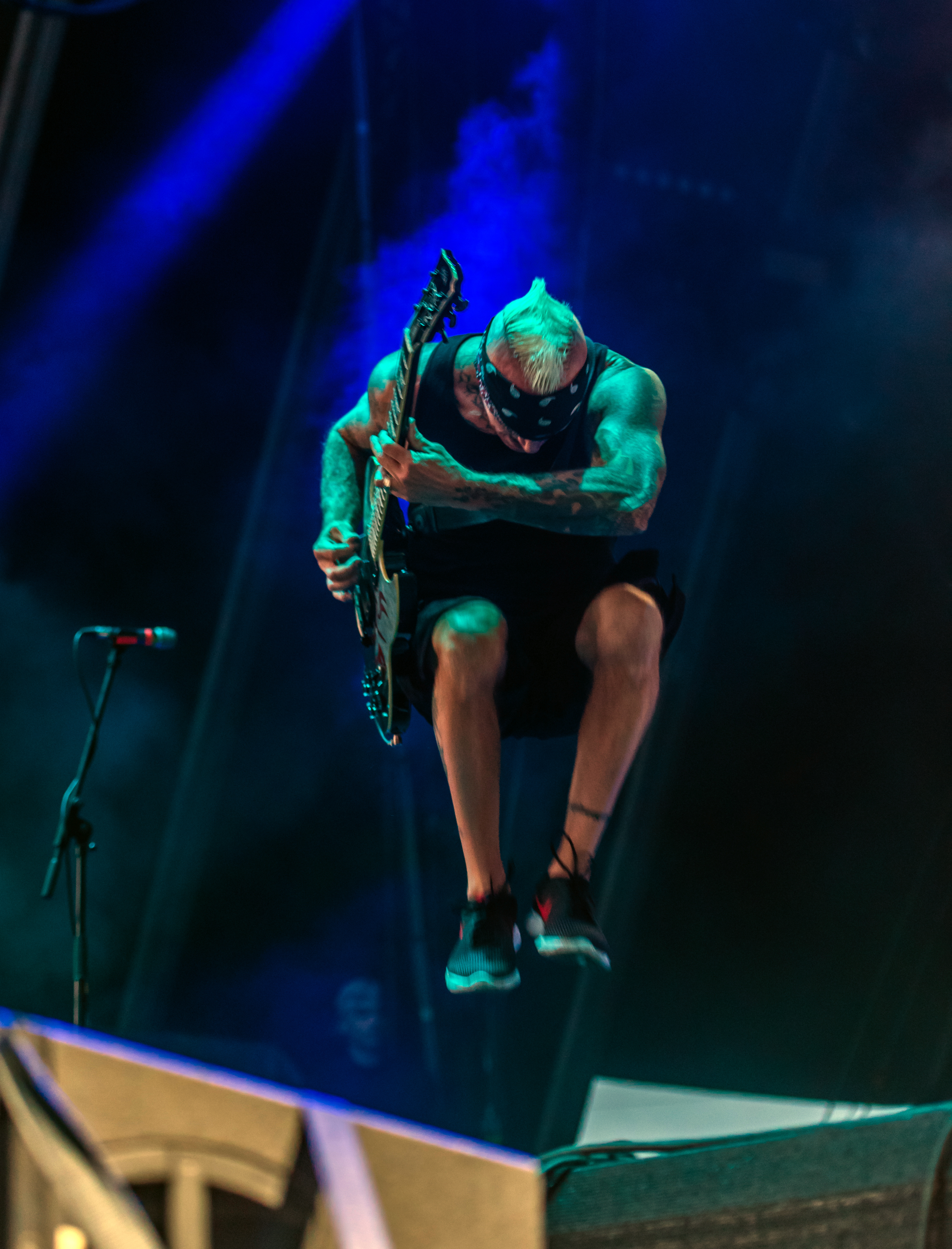
Koller in 2018

=== Studio albums ===
- Blood, Sweat and No Tears (1989)
- Just Look Around (1992)
- Scratch the Surface (1994)
- Built to Last (1997)
- Call to Arms (1999)
- Yours Truly (2000)
- Life on the Ropes (2003)
- Death to Tyrants (2006)
- Based on a True Story (2010)
- XXV Nonstop (2011)
- The Last Act of Defiance (2014)
- Wake the Sleeping Dragon! (2018)

=== Guest appearances ===
- Gorilla Biscuits – Start Today (backing vocals)
- Black Train Jack – "What's the Deal" and "The Reason"
- H2O — "My Love is Real” (guitar)
- Super Junky Monkey — "If"
