= Live in a Dive (Sick of It All album) =

Live album by Sick of It All
- Released: August 13, 2002
- Recorded: Bottom of the Hill, San Francisco, California, US
- Genre: Hardcore punk
- Length: 48:52
- Label: Fat Wreck Chords
- Producer: Sick of It All

Sick of It All chronology
Yours Truly (2000)	Live in a Dive (2002)	Life on the Ropes (2003)

Live in a Dive chronology
Bracket (2002)	Sick of It All (2002)	Strung Out (2003)

Professional ratings
Review scores
Source	Rating
AllMusic	4/5 stars

Live in a Dive is a recording of live material from the New York City hardcore punk band, Sick of It All. It is part of a Fat Wreck Chords series of Live in a Dive albums, this one being released in August, 2002. The CD version contains 23 songs and an interview clip, while the vinyl edition contains an additional song "Bullshit Justice."

== Reception ==
Ox-Fanzine wrote "Songs like "Us Vs. Them," "My Life," "Step Down," and "Busted" sound much better live. For those whose parents won't allow them to go to hardcore concerts, this album perfectly captures the atmosphere of a SOIA show, and for everyone else, it's a nice reminder of the last concert. The sound quality is also very good, which adds even more points."

== Track listing ==
- All tracks written by Sick of It All, unless stated otherwise
1. "Good Lookin' Out" – 2:14
2. "Call to Arms" – 1:45
3. "Blown Away" – 2:37
4. "Built to Last" – 1:53
5. "Just Look Around" – 2:43
6. "Let Go" – 1:09
7. "Us Vs. Them" – 3:07
8. "The Bland Within" – 2:39
9. "Disco Sucks Fuck Everything" – 2:11
10. "Injustice System!" – 1:46
11. "Potential for a Fall" – 2:45
12. "Scratch the Surface" – 2:39
13. "America" – 2:22
14. "Straight Ahead" (Carroll, Setari) – 2:19
15. "Rat Pack" – 2:01
16. "Sanctuary" – 1:49
17. "My Life" – 0:55
18. "Busted" – 1:30
19. "Maladjusted" – 2:56
20. "Goatless" – 1:29
21. "Friends Like You" – 1:41
22. "Clobberin' Time" – 0:53
23. "Step Down" – 3:29
24. "Bullshit Justice" – 2:10? (vinyl release only)
- Tracks 1, 4, 7 and 18 originally recorded for Built to Last (1997)
- Tracks 2, 6, 11 and 16 originally recorded for Call to Arms (1999)
- Tracks 3, 8, 9 and 13 originally recorded for Yours Truly (2000)
- Track 5 originally recorded for Just Look Around (1992)
- Tracks 10, 15, 17, 21, 22 and 24 originally recorded for Blood, Sweat and No Tears (1989)
- Tracks 12, 19, 20 and 23 originally recorded for Scratch the Surface (1994)

== Credits ==
- Lou Koller – vocals
- Pete Koller – guitar
- Craig Setari – bass guitar
- Armand Majidi – drums
- Recorded at Bottom of the Hill, San Francisco, California, US
- Engineered by Ryan Greene
