= Outtakes for the Outcast =

Compilation album by Sick of It All
- Released: October 19, 2004
- Recorded: 1992 – 2001
- Genre: Hardcore punk
- Length: 27:24
- Label: Fat Wreck Chords
- Producers: Steve Evetts, John Seymour, Don Fury, Dan Iannuzzelli

Sick of It All chronology
Life on the Ropes (2003)	Outtakes for the Outcast (2004)	Death to Tyrants (2006)

Professional ratings
Review scores
Source	Rating
AllMusic	3.5/5 stars
Punknews.org	3.5/5 stars

Outtakes for the Outcast is a compilation album by New York City hardcore punk band Sick of It All. It contains unreleased original songs, B-sides, and cover versions. It was the last album released by the band on Fat Wreck Chords before their move to Abacus Recordings.

== Critical reception ==
PopMatters wrote that "there's plenty for hardcore SOIA fans/completists to enjoy on Outtakes for the Outcast, and even folks who can't imagine listening to hardcore music might find something to their liking." Ox-Fanzine gave the album a 7/10 adding "The runtime is a bit on the short side, and the booklet could have been more elaborate. Nevertheless, "Outtakes for the Outcast" is no mere collection of leftovers; it is a solid, expertly crafted release bearing the Sick of It All seal of quality."

== Track listing ==
All tracks are written by Sick of It All except where noted.

No.	Title	Writer(s)	Length
1.	"I Believe"		1:57
2.	"Stood for Nothing"		0:58
3.	"Borstal Breakout" (Sham 69 cover)	Jimmy Pursey; Dave Parsons	2:00
4.	"Straight Ahead" (Straight Ahead cover)	Tommy Carroll; Craig Setari	0:55
5.	"All Hell Breaks Loose" (Misfits cover)	Glenn Danzig	2:14
6.	"My Little World"		1:53
7.	"Soul Be Free"		2:36
8.	"Blatty (Human Egg)"		0:32
9.	"86"		2:27
10.	"Target" (Hüsker Dü cover)	Bob Mould	1:44
11.	"Rip Off" (Sham 69 cover)	Pursey; Parsons	1:09
12.	"Working Class Kids" (The Last Resort cover)	Roi Pearce; Graham Saxby	1:24
13.	"Never Measure Up"	Lou Koller; Armand Majidi	1:41
14.	"The Future Is Mine"		2:24
15.	"Just Look Around (House of Pain remix)"		3:30
Total length:			27:24

Notes

- The House of Pain remix of "Just Look Around" was originally prevented from release by the record label of House of Pain. As a response Sick Of It All made bootlegs of the song and gave them away at various shows. Since the original recording tape could not be used, the version on this CD was taken from one of the bootlegs.

== Personnel ==
- Lou Koller – vocals
- Pete Koller – guitar
- Craig Setari – bass guitar
- Armand Majidi – drums
- Everlast – vocals on "Just Look Around"
- DJ Lethal – turntables on "Just Look Around"
- Produced by Steve Evetts, John Seymour, Don Fury and Dan Iannuzzelli
- Engineered by Ryan Greene
