= Blood from the Soul =

Industrial metal band

- Genres: Industrial metal
- Years active: 1993, 2005, 2020–present
- Labels: Earache; Deathwish Inc.
- Members: Shane Embury; Jacob Bannon; Dirk Verbeuren; Jesper Liveröd
- Past members: Lou Koller; Mirai Kawashima
- Website: bloodfromthesoul.com

Blood from the Soul is an industrial metal supergroup formed by Napalm Death bassist Shane Embury. The band's debut album, To Spite the Gland That Breeds (1993), featured Embury with Sick of It All vocalist Lou Koller. In 2020, Embury reformed the band with a new line-up, featuring vocalist Jacob Bannon (Converge, Supermachiner), drummer Dirk Verbeuren (Megadeth, Soilwork) and bassist Jesper Liveröd (Nasum, Burst). The band's sophomore record, DSM-5, was released in the same year.

== History ==
Blood from the Soul started out as a collaboration between Shane Embury and Lou Koller of Sick of It All; the band's debut album, To Spite the Gland That Breeds (1993), was released in 1993 via Earache Records. The record featured Embury performing all of the instrumentation. Following the release of the record, the project entered a hiatus. Embury worked on a possible follow-up record with Mirai Kawashima of Sigh in 2005, but the project did not materialize.

In 2020, Embury resurrected the project. After Koller could not commit to the project, Embury approached Converge vocalist Jacob Bannon for collaboration. By then, Megadeth drummer Dirk Verbeuren had been already enlisted to the project and Jesper Liveröd of Nasum had joined the band as the bassist. The band's sophomore record, DSM-5, was released the same year on Bannon's label Deathwish Inc.; Bannon was particularly influential over the album, providing lyrics and visuals, as well as formulating the record as a science fiction concept album. The tracks "Debris of Dreams" and "Calcified Youth" were released as singles. The band also released a music video for the latter track.

== Musical style ==
Blood from the Soul's style has been described as industrial metal. AllMusic James Christopher Monger critic has characterised the debut album, To Spite the Gland That Breeds, as "a punitive blend of grindcore, punk, and industrial metal," writing for the same publication, Cosmo Lee has likened the record to the works of Godflesh and Fear Factory. Being regarded as a progenitor to the establishment of the new wave of American heavy metal scene, the record featured a heavy use of drum machine as in the case for Godflesh's body of work. The follow-up record, DSM-5, featured an increasing influence of metallic hardcore compared to industrial music: Spyros Stasis of PopMatters noted that the record "projects a fusing vision of hardcore, grindcore, melodic metal, and industrial under a shared foundation."

== Members ==
Current members

- Shane Embury — guitar, bass, drum programming (1993, 2005, 2020–present)
- Jacob Bannon — vocals (2020–present)
- Dirk Verbeuren — drums, percussion (2020–present)
- Jesper Liveröd — bass (2020–present)

Past members

- Lou Koller — vocals (1993)
- Mirai Kawashima — vocals (2005)

== Discography ==
Studio albums

- To Spite the Gland That Breeds (1993)
- DSM-5 (2020)

Singles

- "Debris of Dreams" (2020)
- "Calcified Youth" (2020)

Music videos

- "Calcified Youth" (2020; dir. Chariot of the Black Moth)
