= Death to Tyrants =

Studio album by Sick of It All
- Released: April 18, 2006
- Recorded: 2005 at Atomic Recording Studio (Brooklyn, New York)
- Genre: Hardcore punk
- Length: 33:45
- Label: Abacus Recordings
- Producers: Tue Madsen, Armand Majidi

Sick of It All chronology
Outtakes for the Outcast (2004)	Death to Tyrants (2006)	Based on a True Story (2010)

Alternative cover
- Persistence Tour 2006 edition cover

Professional ratings
Review scores
Source	Rating
AllMusic	4/5 stars
Lambgoat	9/10
Metal.de	8/10
Ox-Fanzine	8/10
Punknews.org	4/5 stars
Ultimate Guitar	7.7/10

Death to Tyrants is the eighth album by American hardcore punk band Sick of It All, released on April 18, 2006. On this record, the band introduced a much heavier and stronger sound. This was the first Sick of It All album not released on Fat Wreck Chords (who released their previous three albums) since 1997's Built to Last.

Sick of It All finished the writing process for the record in April 2005, and began recording it in August of that same year.

== Critical reception ==
Corey Apar of AllMusic wrote "Sick of It All kicks off album number nine with a full-on ferocious wallop to the head, a sucker punch to the stomach and, as listeners are kneeling over trying to catch their breath, the band simply blazes on, aggressively doling out their empowered, often revolutionary, message in a little over 30 scorching minutes."

Ash Levitt of Lambgoat also gave the album a positive review writing "The members of Sick of It All are all well versed in their craft, and the experiences of being in a working band, including the writing process of an album, are all old hat now. This is clearly shown on Death to Tyrants. This release is a healthy dose of songs that get in the listener's head and beg to be played again and again. This album stands as a testament to what Sick of It All helped start, and to where the scene as a whole should strive to go."

Chris Moran of Punknews.org added "Sick of It All, who had always somewhat failed to display in their studio recordings. NOTHING has ever captured the ferocity of their live show. Until now. Every song you find yourself singing -- no, make that SHOUTING -- along to; as if you've been there in front of the stage pumping your fist for years."

== Track listing ==
All the tracks were written by Sick of It All.

1. "Take the Night Off" – 2:42
2. "Machete" – 2:05
3. "Preamble" – 0:27
4. "Uprising Nation" – 2:23
5. "Always War" – 2:03
6. "Die Alone" – 2:34
7. "Evil Schemer" – 2:42
8. "Leader" – 1:12
9. "Make a Mark" – 3:08
10. "Forked Tongue" – 1:30
11. "The Reason" – 2:05
12. "Faithless" – 2:51
13. "Fred Army" – 2:43
14. "Thin Skin" – 2:13
15. "Maria White Trash" – 2:50
16. "Don't Join the Crowd" (European edition bonus track) – 2:56

== "Persistence Tour 2006 edition" track listing ==
1. "Take the Night Off" – 2:42
2. "Machete" – 2:05
3. "Preamble" – 0:27
4. "Uprising Nation" – 2:23
5. "Always War" – 2:03
6. "Die Alone" – 2:34
7. "Evil Schemer" – 2:42
8. "Leader" – 1:12
9. "Make a Mark" – 3:08
10. "Forked Tongue" – 1:30
11. "The Reason" – 2:05
12. "Faithless" – 2:51
13. "Fred Army" – 2:43
14. "Thin Skin" – 2:13
15. "Maria White Trash" – 2:50
16. "Don't Join the Crowd" – 2:56
17. Walls of Jericho - "Us Vs. Them" (cover) – 3:14
18. Madball - "Give Respect" (cover) – 1:16
19. "Take the Night Off" (recorded live in Essen, Germany 2006)
20. "Machete" (recorded live in Essen, Germany 2006)
21. "Take the Night Off" music video

== Extra information ==
- "The Reason" was originally called "Sodom"

== Credits ==
- Lou Koller – vocals
- Pete Koller – guitar
- Craig Setari – bass guitar
- Armand Majidi – drums
- Freddy Cricien of Madball – guest vocals on "Forked Tongue"
- Recorded at Atomic Recording Studio, Brooklyn, New York
- Pre-production at Underground Sound Studios, South Amboy, New Jersey
- Produced by Tue Madsen and Armand Majidi
- Layout and design by Empty Design Coalition
- Dave Quiggle – artwork
