= Life on the Ropes =

Studio album by Sick of It All
- Released: September 9, 2003
- Studios: Atomic, Brooklyn, New York, US
- Genre: Hardcore punk
- Length: 38:22
- Label: Fat Wreck Chords
- Producers: Sick of It All, Dean Baltolonis

Sick of It All chronology
Live in a Dive (2002)	Life on the Ropes (2003)	Outtakes for the Outcast (2004)

Professional ratings
Review scores
Source	Rating
AllMusic	4/5 stars
Drowned in Sound	8/10
Punknews.org	4/5 stars

Life on the Ropes is a studio album from American hardcore punk band Sick of It All. Released in September 2003, it was the band's final album of new material on Fat Wreck Chords until 2018's Wake the Sleeping Dragon! The album features guest backing vocals from, among others, John Joseph of Cro-Mags.

== Track listing ==
All tracks are written by Sick of It All.

No.	Title	Length
1.	"Relentless"	2:24
2.	"All My Blessings"	1:48
3.	"The Land Increases"	1:38
4.	"Paper Tiger (Fakin' the Punk)"	2:08
5.	"The Innocent"	2:51
6.	"Silence"	2:38
7.	"View from the Surface"	2:32
8.	"Going All Out"	2:29
9.	"Rewind"	2:21
10.	"Shit Sandwich"	1:04
11.	"Butting Heads"	2:46
12.	"Take Control"	2:17
13.	"Kept in Check"	2:42
14.	"On the Brink"	2:26
15.	"Trenches"	3:33
Total length:		38:22

== Credits ==
- Lou Koller – vocals
- Pete Koller – guitar
- Craig Setari – bass guitar
- Armand Majidi – drums
- John Joseph of Cro-Mags – guest vocals on Paper Tiger (Fakin' The Punk)
- Opening line by Robert De Niro sampled from the 1978 movie The Deer Hunter
- Recorded at Atomic Recording Company, Brooklyn, New York, US
- Produced by Sick of It All and Dean Baltolonis
