= We Stand Alone =

EP by Sick of It All
- Released: January 25, 1991
- Recorded: Dony Fury's Demo Demo Studios
- Genre: Hardcore punk
- Length: 27:24
- Label: In-Effect

Sick of It All chronology
Blood, Sweat, and No Tears (1989)	We Stand Alone (1991)	Just Look Around (1992)

We Stand Alone is an EP by American hardcore punk band Sick of It All, released in 1991. All live tracks were recorded in Oklahoma City on March 18, 1990. The track "Betray" is a cover by fellow hardcore punk band Minor Threat. Live tracks 4–11 do not appear on the vinyl release.

== Track listing ==
1. "What's Going On" – 2:20
2. "Betray" (Minor Threat cover) – 2:46
3. "We Stand Alone" – 2:05
4. "Disillusion" (live) – 3:21
5. "My Revenge" / "World Full of Hate" (live) – 2:57
6. "Pete's Sake" (live) – 1:13
7. "Injustice System" (live) – 2:01
8. "The Deal" (live) – 1:11
9. "G.I. Joe Headstomp" (live) – 1:37
10. "Pushed Too Far" (live) – 2:11
11. "The Blood & the Sweat" (live) – 4:13
12. "Politics" (live) – 1:30
