= Lou Koller =

American punk rock singer (1965–2026)

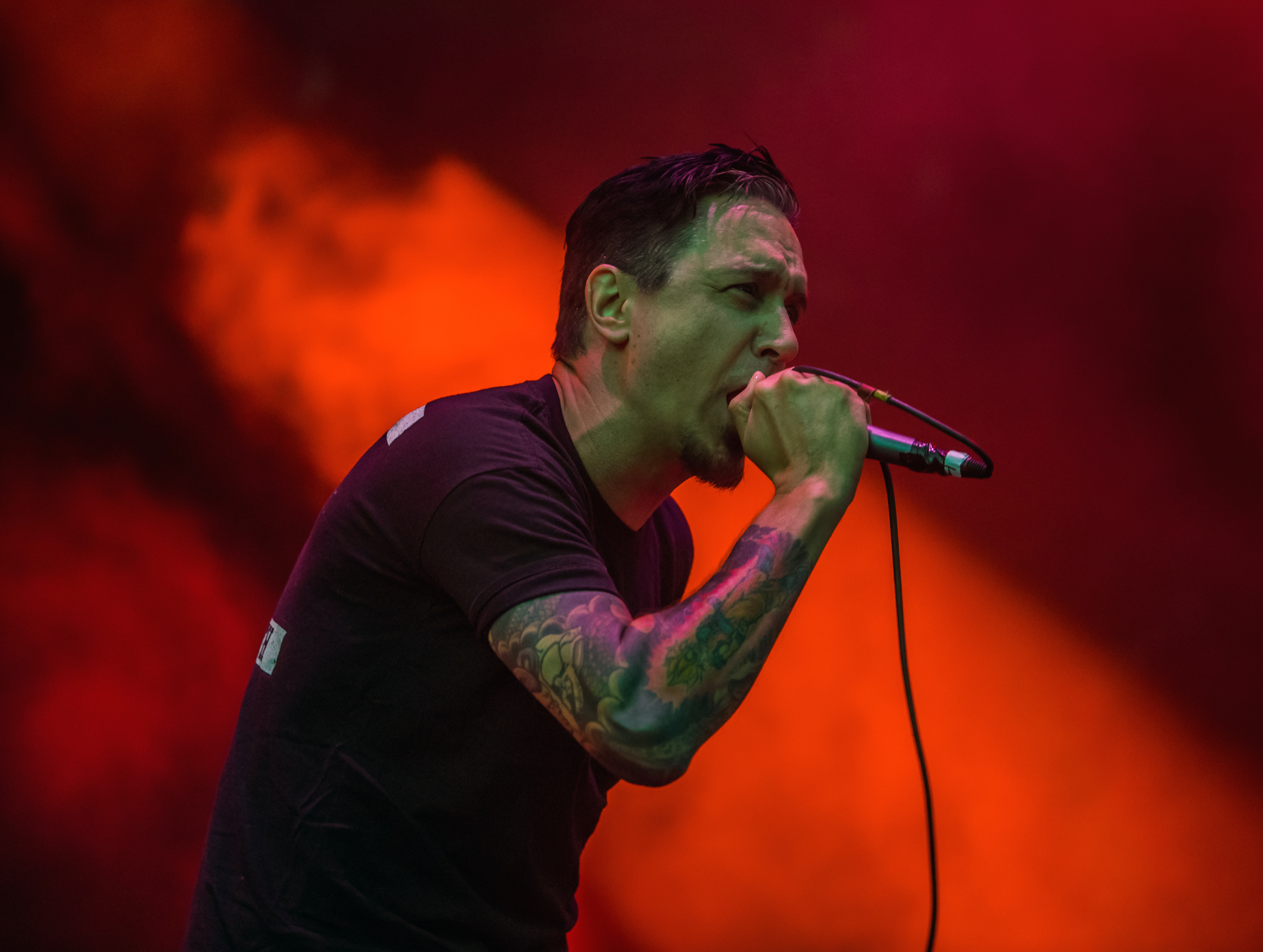
- Koller with Reload Festival in 2018

Background information
- Born: Louis Pierre Koller; July 15, 1965; New York City, U.S.
- Died: July 24, 2026 (aged 61) (Note: Some sources erroneously state he was 59 at the time of his death.) Matawan, New Jersey, U.S.
- Genre: Hardcore punk
- Occupation: Singer
- Years active: 1986–2026
- Formerly of: Sick of It All; Blood from the Soul

Louis Pierre Koller (July 15, 1965 – July 24, 2026) was an American hardcore punk vocalist and a founding member of the New York City hardcore band Sick of It All. He was previously a member of Blood from the Soul. Koller and his brother Pete Koller have been described as two of the most influential figures in New York hardcore.

== Early life ==
Louis Pierre Koller was born in Flushing, Queens, on July 15, 1965, and raised in a middle-class family in the Queens borough of New York City, alongside his three brothers, one of them being future Sick of It All bandmate Pete Koller. Growing up, Koller and his brothers would listen to rock bands such as Deep Purple and Rainbow. However, he and his brother Pete would eventually get into heavier music, such as by Black Sabbath and Motörhead. He stated in a 2016 interview that Judas Priest were the first heavy metal band he got into.

He and Pete both attended Francis Lewis High School in Queens. During his high school years, Koller worked in a theatre to obtain high school credits for sound engineering.

== Career ==
=== Sick of It All ===
==== Early years and rise to prominence (1986–2000) ====
Koller and his brother Pete decided to form a band called Sick of It All in 1986. The initial line up consisted of Koller playing bass and providing vocals, Pete on guitar and David Lamb on drums. Koller and his brother originally wanted the band to be named General Chaos, however Lamb proposed calling the band Sick of All, with the intent to abbreviate it to S.O.A. However Koller had pointed out that another band existed with that name and the group decided to expand the name to Sick of It All. Koller then strictly moved to vocals following bassist Mark McNeely joining the band soon after. Then just after one month of being formed, Sick of It All played their first show on Saturday, May 17, 1986, at the Right Track Inn in Long Island, supporting Youth of Today, Straight Ahead and Crippled Youth. Shortly thereafter, both Lamb and McNeely left the band and were replaced by Armand Majidi and Rich Cipriano respectively.

In a 2015 interview, Koller commented on the inspiration behind him and his brother starting Sick of It All, stating:

We all used to hang out. There was Rest in Pieces, Straight Ahead... the early hardcore scene. We wanted to start our own thing. At the time, my parents used to go away for two weeks in the summer, so we would all be jamming in my basement. Armand and Craig would come over, and we would play all these stupid songs that we made up. We would play so loud; it was during the day, and all the neighbors would be standing outside staring at the house. Eventually, Pete and I decided that we wanted to start a real band.

The group then released their debut self-titled EP in 1987. Koller and Sick of It All released their first full-length effort in 1989, Blood, Sweat, and No Tears, which is viewed as a landmark record for the hardcore genre. Koller and the band then embarked on their first national tour in support of the album, as both a headliner and supporting act for Bad Brains. Prior to a 1990 tour with Agnostic Front, both Cipriano and Majidi left the band. However, Koller and Pete made the decision to keep the band going, finding replacements in Eddie Coen and Eric Komst, respectively. However, by the time Sick of It All recorded their second album Just Look Around (1992), Majidi and Cipriano had already rejoined the band.

Sick of It All then released their third album Scratch the Surface (1994), which went on to sell 250,000 copies worldwide by 1997. Both Koller and his brother credited the album with expanding the band's fanbase in Europe, with Koller claiming that people "came and checked it out and stayed with us forever". With the success of the record, the group then went on a worldwide tour in support of the album making stops in North and South America, Europe, Japan, and New Zealand. This was followed by 1997's Built to Last, and 1999's Call to Arms.

During this time, Sick of It All began to export New York hardcore to a wider audience by playing around the world. Koller commented on this in an interview with Kerrang! stating "We wanted to show the world what we loved. That's why we didn't just play with hardcore bands."

==== 2000s and 2010s ====
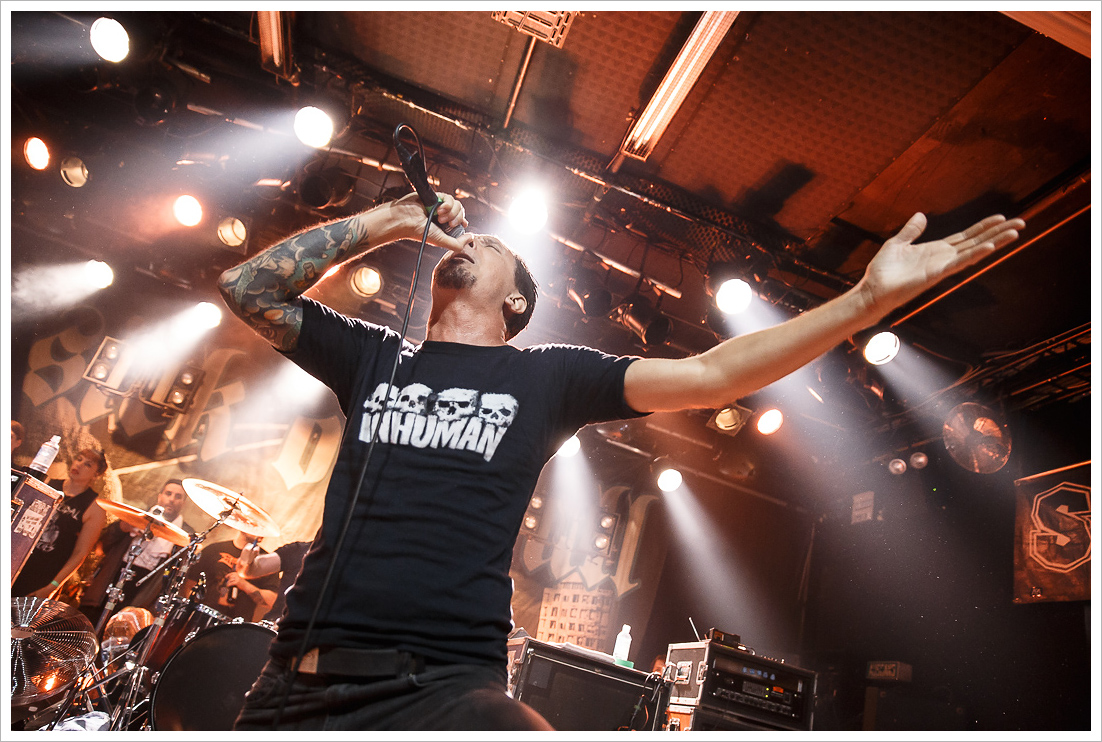
Koller performing at the SO36 in 2014

In 2000, Yours Truly was released, and the following year in 2001, Koller alongside the rest of the band took part in a documentary The Story So Far; the film showed the band's career up to that point, from their beginnings to their unexpected rise to fame. Their seventh album Life on the Ropes was released in 2003. Another album titled Death to Tyrants was released on April 18, 2006.

In an August 2009 interview with singer Lou Koller, he revealed that the band would begin recording their new album in November for a 2010 release. Based on a True Story was then released on April 20, 2010. Four years later, their eleventh album, tilted Last Act of Defiance, was released on September 30, 2014. Their last album Wake the Sleeping Dragon! was released on November 2, 2018.

==== Final developments (2020–2026) ====
In 2021, Koller (alongside his brother) released an autobiography they wrote together titled The Blood and Sweat: The Story of Sick of It All's Koller Brothers. The book goes over the two brothers' entire lives from childhood to their time in the band, also featuring commentary from other band members past and present. Decibel claimed the book is "One the best books ever written about hardcore".

In June 2024, Sick of It All cancelled an upcoming European tour set to begin in July. Following the announcement, Koller revealed his diagnosis with an esophageal tumor. In November of 2024, a benefit show was held in support of Koller with many bands, such as Life of Agony, Municipal Waste, Crown of Thornz and Vision of Disorder playing at the show.

Following Koller revealing his cancer had gone away, bassist Craig Setari confirmed that new music from Sick of It All is in the works, and added that "the plan is in 2026, somewhere in the warm weather of 2026, to potentially play some shows, if everything goes like it's been going." However Koller's cancer returned soon after the announcement. A second benefit show for Lou called "A Benefit for Lou Koller" was held on February 1, 2026 and featured Life of Agony, Stigma, and several other New York bands.

Following his death his brother Pete put out a statement in September 2026, stating that the band will continue in Lou’s memory as it was one of his final wishes.

=== Blood from the Soul ===
In 1993, Koller started a side project with Napalm Death bassist Shane Embury called Blood from the Soul. The duo's debut album, To Spite the Gland That Breeds, was released in 1993 via Earache Records. The group then went on indefinite hiatus. Embury did eventually resurrect the group back in 2020; however, Koller could not commit to the project.

== Personal life ==
Koller resided in New Jersey during later life, and had one daughter with his wife Melissa.

Koller had a sleeve tattoo on his right arm featuring characters from Dragon Ball Z, and had the Sick of it All logo tattooed on his left shoulder. Koller also enjoyed skateboarding.

When the Punk Rock Museum opened in 2023, Koller worked as an official tour guide.

=== Health problems and death ===
In 2024, Koller announced that he had been diagnosed with an esophageal tumor, and then underwent treatment over the course of the summer. In May 2025, Koller announced that he was "officially cancer-free" and "excited to move forward and get Sick of It All back on track". However, by the end of September, Koller announced that the cancer had returned. In December 2025, Koller provided an update stating that the treatments were "not really doing much. I'm kind of at a stalemate where the tumors aren't growing and they're not spreading, but they're not shrinking either. So the plan is to keep going with the treatments and see what happens." His brother Pete also revealed that Koller had lost 70 pounds during his treatments and was put on a feeding tube.

Koller died at a hospice in Matawan, New Jersey, on July 24, 2026, at the age of 61. Sick of It All put out a tribute to Koller on their social media pages reading "We have lost a beloved friend and an iconic frontman. Lou had the power to raise everyone's spirits at our shows with a smile and a sarcastic comment, and he won people over wherever we played, from every culture and every corner of the world." Tributes from Koller's friends, fans and peers instantly appeared on Sick of It All's social media. WWE wrestler CM Punk posted "Love you Lou and SOIA. Thank you for the soundtrack for my life. Sending hugs. Tonight's 'clobberin' time' is for Lou" while Dropkick Murphys added "All our love to the SOIA family and especially the Koller family. Rest In Peace Lou we are so glad to have shared many great memories with you. Always a class act and gentleman. Gone but NEVER FORGOTTEN". Chuck Ragan also wrote, "Lou was indeed a pillar in our world of music to me and will never be forgotten." Other tributes came from numerous bands and members of Anthrax, Knocked Loose, Voodoo Glow Skulls, the Ramones, Harms Way, American Nightmare, Thursday, Life of Agony, Fishbone, Strife, Murphy’s Law, Rancid, Cro-Mags, Madball, Agnostic Front, Korn, Rise Against, Machine Head, Biohazard, and Unearth. On the day of his death Hatebreed dedicated their set in Buffalo, New York to Koller. Lamb of God also dedicated their song "Into Oblivion" to Koller, performed at the Hills of Rock festival in Plovdiv, Bulgaria, on July 26. Both Drain and Judge also played covers of "It's Clobberin' Time" during their sets at the Warped tour.

A memorial gathering and celebration of life was held for Koller on August 3, 2026, in New Jersey.

== Style and influences ==
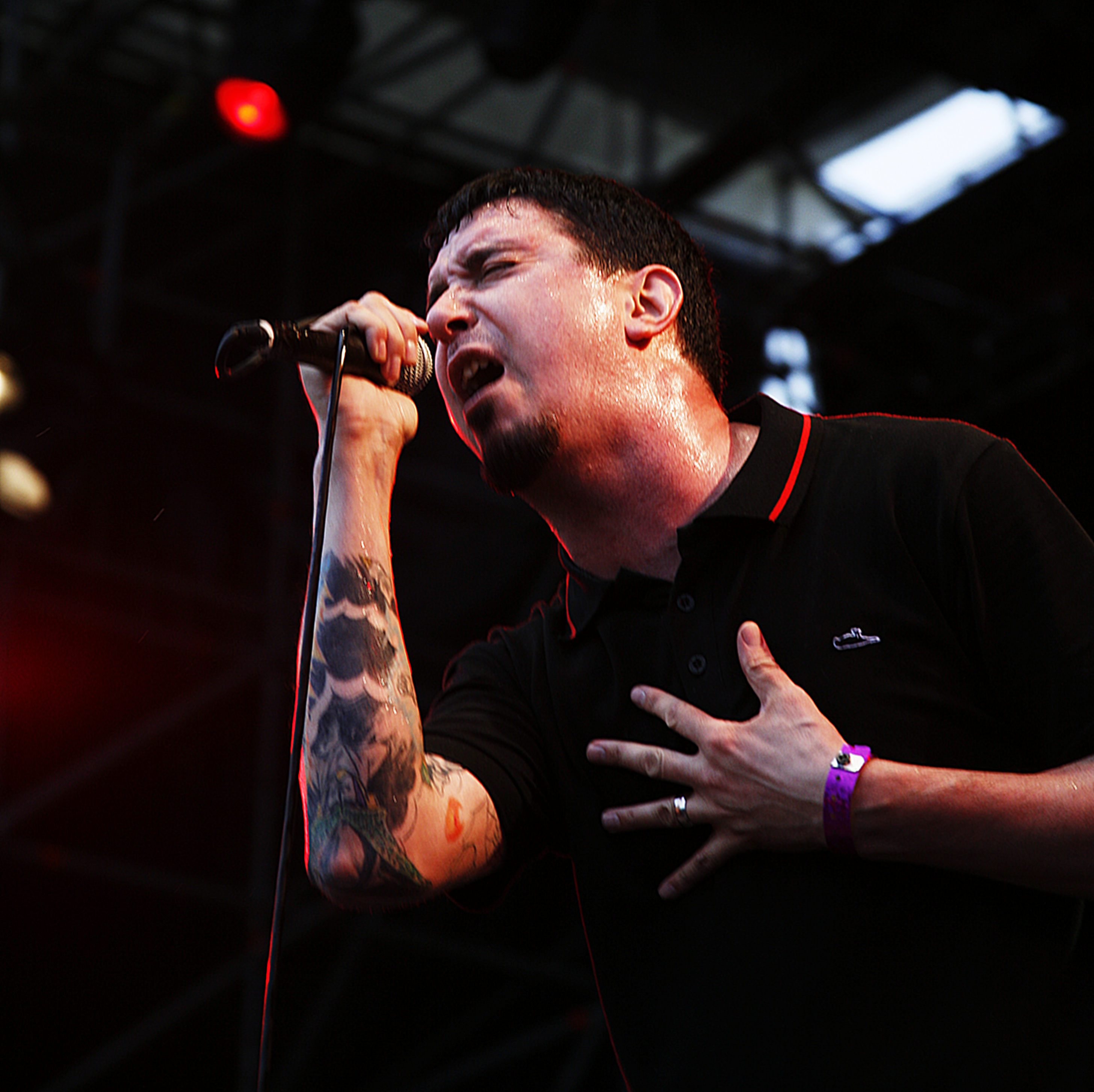
Koller live at the Eurockéennes in 2007

Revolver described Koller's vocal style as "super scratchy, often intimidating, sometimes melodic, and always fiercely-delivered".

Koller served as the main songwriter for Sick of It All, using music to express his views on the "crime and corruption" which often featured in local New York City news of the 1980s. His lyrics tended to deal with community, politics, social issues, as well as frustration and anger. Kory Grow writing for Rolling Stone dubbed Koller "New York Hardcores greatest ambassador" adding "he sang about inclusivity and fostering friendship in bleak times, spreading the hardcore reality around the world for decades."

In a 2014 interview, he commented on his lyrical themes stating:

When I write lyrics, and it might be left of center but I try to keep it general so that people will actually try to relate to it. And when someone who maybe has opposing views relates to that song then maybe it starts a dialogue.

When asked on who has had the biggest influence on his vocal style, Koller stated:

It's a combination. When I first started, I really didn't know how to do anything, but I wanted to sound as hard and as rough as the singer, John Brandon [sic], from Negative Approach and also Chris, the singer of Crumbsuckers because he also sounded like John Brandon [sic]. But now, for the last 10 years or so, I still try to emulate that, but I try to have a bit more range. One of my favorites is Lemmy from Motorhead because he had such a rough voice, but he had this melody, too. He could hit the notes but was just a great vocalist. I know a lot of people think that's crazy, but I just love that he had such a rough sound. Chuck from Hot Water Music, too, has such a rough voice, but it's also so melodic. He just does it great. He's another one I would like to sing like.

To keep his voice in shape throughout the years, Koller spent time with many professional vocal coaches such as Melissa Cross. She once told Koller "Sing how you sing. I could give you a couple of pointers, but you do what you do very well." He has claimed the way he sang is "more using the muscles around my vocal cords and all that".

== Discography ==
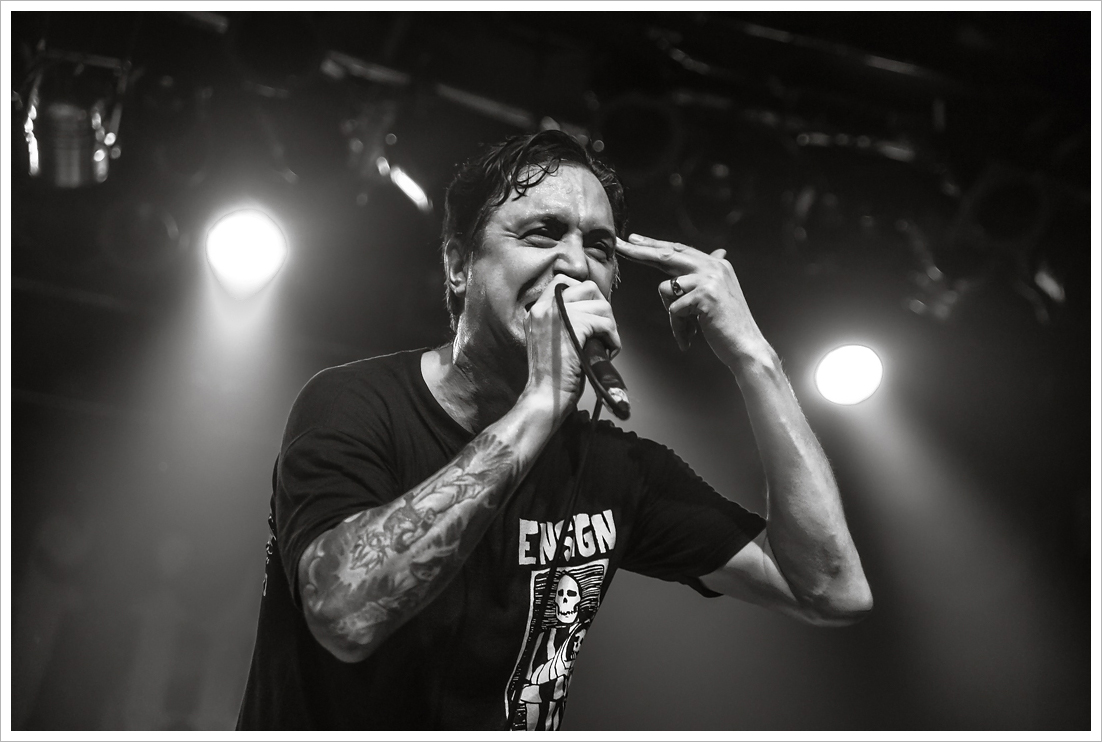
Koller at the SO36 in 2016

=== Sick of it All ===
This is a list of albums released by Sick of it All.

- Blood, Sweat and No Tears (1989)
- Just Look Around (1992)
- Scratch the Surface (1994)
- Built to Last (1997)
- Call to Arms (1999)
- Yours Truly (2000)
- Life on the Ropes (2003)
- Death to Tyrants (2006)
- Based on a True Story (2010)
- XXV Nonstop (2011)
- The Last Act of Defiance (2014)
- Wake the Sleeping Dragon! (2018)

=== Blood from the Soul ===
- To Spite the Gland That Breeds (1993)
