= Blood, Sweat, and No Tears =

Studio album by Sick of It All
- Released: July 12, 1989
- Studios: Normandy Sound (Warren, Rhode Island)
- Genre: Hardcore punk
- Length: 27:21
- Labels: In-Effect; Relativity
- Producer: Sick of It All

Sick of It All chronology
Sick of It All (1987)	Blood, Sweat, and No Tears (1989)	We Stand Alone (1991)

Blood, Sweat, and No Tears is the debut studio album by the American hardcore punk band Sick of It All, released on July 12, 1989, through the Relativity Records imprint label In-Effect Records. The band recorded and mixed the album in three days with engineer Tom Soares at Normandy Sound in Warren, Rhode Island. Blood, Sweat, and No Tears is a hardcore punk album marked by heavy guitarwork and lyrics addressing personal and political topics. KRS-One makes a guest appearance on the album; future Sick of It All bassist Craig Setari also assisted during recording and contributed to the lyrics of "Bullshit Justice" and "The Blood and the Sweat".

Sick of It All promoted Blood, Sweat, and No Tears through tours of the United States with Bad Brains, Leeway, D.R.I. and Agnostic Front, and a music video for "Injustice System". A surprise success, Blood, Sweat, and No Tears sold over 100,000 copies and is retrospectively regarded as a defining New York hardcore album, although vocalist Lou Koller considered it to be unlistenable due to the quality of the band's performances. After initially planning to re-record the album in its entirety, Sick of It All re-recorded a number of its songs for their tenth album XXV Nonstop (2011).

== Background and recording ==
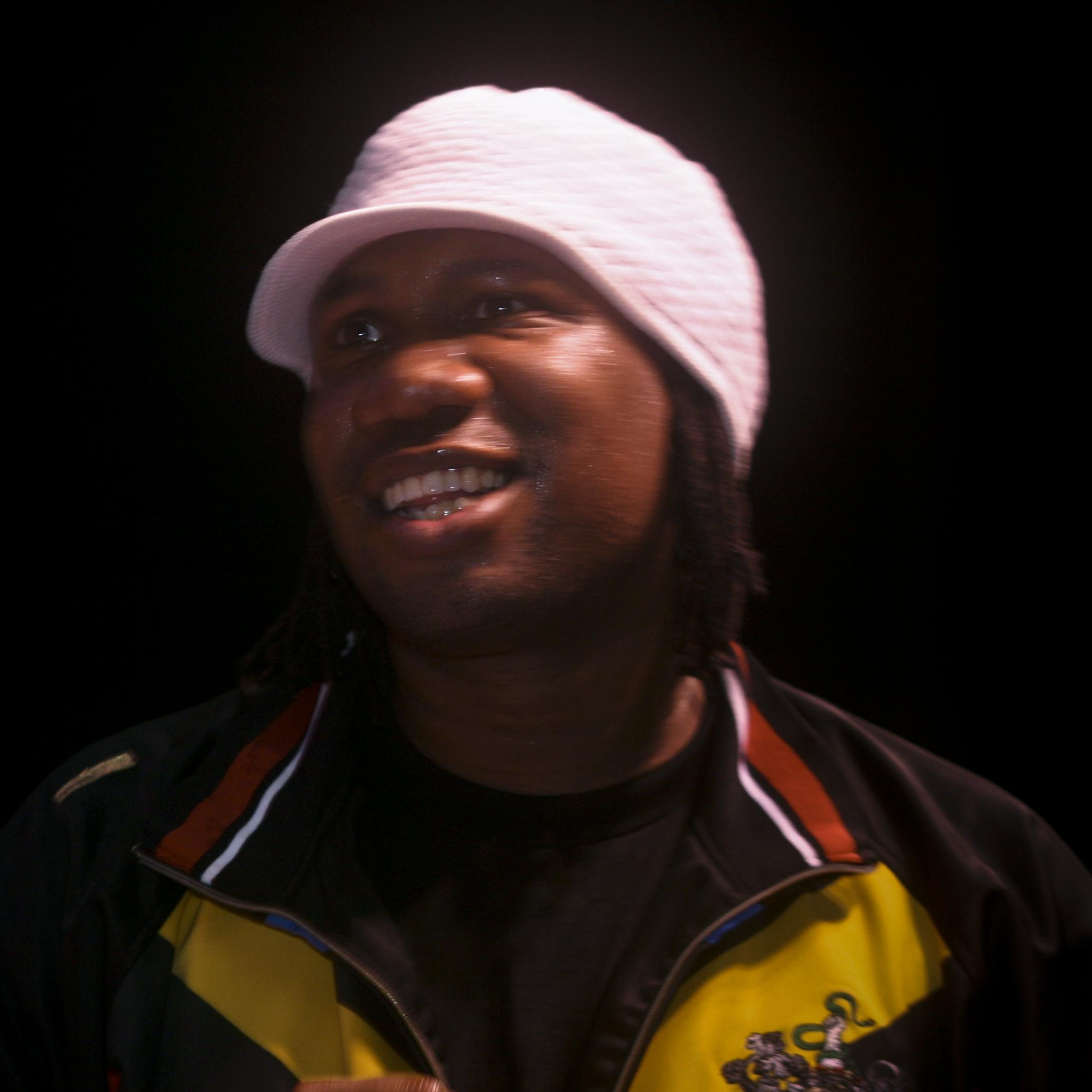
KRS-One (pictured) makes a guest appearance on "Clobberin' Time".

Sick of It All were formed in New York City in 1986 by brothers Lou and Pete Koller. Lou initially started on bass before deciding to become the band's vocalist; Pete was the band's guitarist. Following their first show, booked by future bandmate Craig Setari, the Koller brothers recruited bassist Rich Cipriano and drummer Armand Majidi. In 1987, Sick of It All recorded and released their eponymous debut extended play through Revelation Records. In 1988, Sick of It All signed to Relativity Records and their new imprint label In-Effect Records, co-founded by Combat Records salesman Howie Abrams and Agnostic Front guitarist Steve Martin. Revelation had expressed interest in releasing Sick of It All's debut album but told the band they would have to wait a year as they were planning to release an album by Gorilla Biscuits. The band's deal with Relativity was to last for seven albums; Lou said they signed as they thought they would disband after their first. "We were kids [...] we didn't think we'd be doing this forever."

Sick of It All recorded Blood, Sweat, and No Tears with engineer Tom Soares at Normandy Sound in Warren, Rhode Island. Lou said that the band wanted to record at Normandy Sound as they liked the sound of Leeway's debut album, Born to Expire (1989). The band had three days to record and mix the album; Soares mixed all of its songs in a single twelve-hour session. Setari assisted the band during recording, tuning instruments. He also worked with Majidi on the lyrics of "The Blood and the Sweat" and wrote the chorus of "Bullshit Justice". "Clobberin' Time" features a spoken word intro by KRS-One of Boogie Down Productions, who briefly visited the studio after the girlfriend of Pete and Lou's oldest brother Steve told him the band were fans of his music.

== Composition and lyrics ==
Blood, Sweat, and No Tears is a hardcore punk album. The album has a running time of just under 30 minutes, with most of its songs lasting less than two minutes in length. The Encyclopedia of Popular Music called it "punishing, primal punk rock music", whilst Mike DaRonco of AllMusic described its songs as "aggressive, start-stop hardcore". The Morning Call labelled it the "aural equivalent of a mugging". Its songs feature heavy, "pummelling" guitar work, anthemic choruses, and breakdowns; no songs contain guitar solos. Lou said that Sick of It All attempted to make a "heavy" sound without it being metal, in the vein of Negative Approach and Cro-Mags. "Give Respect" and "Friends Like You" were both influenced by Oi! music. Pete highlighted "Alone" and "Disillusion", the last two songs written prior to recording, for their metal and hip-hop influences; he and Lou viewed both songs as marking the start of Sick of It All developing their own sound.

According to The Morning Call, the album's lyrics are "mostly about survival on the street and the hypocrisy of everyday life in America." Mike Gitter of Kerrang! compared Sick of It All to D.R.I. in that they "[waste] no time in getting to the point of matters, empathetically ranting 'gainst whatever they've got on their minds." Citing the songs "World Full of Hate" and "Friends Like You", Jason Roche of The Village Voice described its outlook as being angrier than that of Sick of It All's later releases. Lou said the lyrics are "mostly personal"—"Disillusion" and "Alone" being particular examples—with some "political stuff" inspired by the English punk bands Crass, Discharge, and the Exploited. The title of "Clobberin' Time" is a reference to the Fantastic Four. "Pushed Too Far" is about Lou's perceptions on the hardcore scene, and dealing with harassment from outsiders. He wrote "Bullshit Justice" after watching a murderer "get off on some technicality" on a crime TV show. "No Labels" is about hypocritical people who claimed they were "super straight edge". Likewise, "The Deal" is about bands who formerly criticized, but are now supported by, big record labels. "Injustice System" was inspired by an incident in New Rochelle, New York, where the Koller brothers and Minus frontman Jason Krakdown were attacked by police after a riot broke out following a concert supporting Murphy's Law, with Pete being arrested for biting the fingers of an officer and held for three days before charges were dropped.

== Release and promotion ==
Blood, Sweat, and No Tears was released through In-Effect and Relativity on July 12, 1989. The inner sleeve photo shows a "wall of death" at a Sick of It All concert supporting Warzone at The Ritz in New York City. Sick of It All opted to not include a full lyric sheet with copies of the album to expand its reach and allow it to be sold in malls and chain stores, which usually did not carry albums with profanity. The band embarked on their first national tour in support of the album, as both a headliner and supporting act for Bad Brains, joining halfway through Bad Brains' Quickness tour with Leeway, and touring the West Coast of the United States with both bands for two weeks. Thereafter, Majidi left Sick of It All to focus on his other band Rest in Pieces, and Max Capshaw was recruited as his replacement.

On September 15, 1989, Sick of It All performed a showcase with Killing Time and Nuclear Assault at the Sundance in Bay Shore, after which they embarked on a headlining tour of the North Eastern United States in the fall of 1989. The band also filmed a music video for "Injustice System". Lou was dissatisfied with the video, believing it was too censored and that Majidi should have been in it instead of Capshaw, since he performed on the record. Majidi ultimately returned to Sick of It All for a national tour with D.R.I., with Capshaw "[not working] out because he was too young", according to Lou.

Prior to touring with Agnostic Front in 1990, Cipriano and Majidi both left Sick of It All. The Koller brothers decided to continue the band, replacing both departed members with Eddie Coen and Eric Komst, respectively. Both members appear alongside photos of the old lineup in the liner notes of the We Stand Alone EP (1991), which Lou and Pete intended to show they were committed to continuing Sick of It All. Coen left to join Cycle Sluts from Hell following the Agnostic Front tour, and Komst was later fired. By the time Sick of It All recorded their second album Just Look Around (1992), Majidi and Cipriano had rejoined the band.

== Reception and legacy ==
Professional ratings
Review scores
Source	Rating
AllMusic	4.5/5 stars
The Encyclopedia of Popular Music	3/5 stars
The Great Metal Discography	6/10
Kerrang!	4/5 stars
Metal Forces	90/100
MusicHound Rock	3.5/5 stars
RIP	3/4 stars

In a contemporary review for Cashbox, Jannis Garza called Blood, Sweat, and No Tears a "tuneful, humorously cynical [album]" and a "paradise" for slam dancers. Kerrang!'s Mike Gitter praised the album's catchy songwriting and production and believed that "with a smidgeon of good fortune", Sick of It All would set "the standard of Thrash for the decade to come". Carl Williams of Metal Forces highlighted the album's incorporation of metal influences and "live sweatbox feel" and said: "if you buy one US hardcore LP ever again, make it this one". Ira Robbins of The Trouser Press Guide to '90s Rock called it a "clearly articulated" albeit unoriginal debut. MusicHound Rock reviewer Brian Ives favorably considered the album to be "more explosive than any of [Sick of It All's] subsequent releases (though not by much)". The album was nominated in the Heavy Metal category at the 1989 NAIRD Indie Awards.

A surprise success, Blood, Sweat, and No Tears sold 25,000 copies within six weeks of its release, and went on to sell more than 100,000 copies. DaRonco of AllMusic retrospectively described the album as "epitomiz[ing] the sound of modern New York hardcore" and credited it, alongside releases from Gorilla Biscuits and Youth of Today, with helping popularize the breakdown in hardcore. Chris Ingham of Metal Hammer called it a "blueprint" for New York hardcore in the 1980s, whilst Joachim Hiller of Ox-Fanzine said it "heralded a generational shift in NYHC, establishing the tone for the 1990s and the growing popularity of the genre." Kerrang! likewise said it "helped change the definition of New York hardcore as the world knew it" and ranked the album at number 28 on its 2019 list of the "50 Best Albums of 1989". Hit Parader named it the greatest hardcore album of all time in 2007, whilst The Village Voice ranked the album at number 16 on its 2013 list of the "Top 20 New York Hardcore and Metal Albums of All Time". Revolver ranked the album at number 18 on their 2018 list of the "50 Greatest Punk Albums of All Time", later including it on their 2021 list of "10 Essential New York Hardcore Albums". Noisecreep also listed it as one the "Top 10 New York Hardcore Albums". In 2026, Rolling Stone ranked the album at number 92 on their list of the "100 Greatest Punk Albums of All Time". Keith Caputo of Life of Agony, Vinnie Caruana of The Movielife, Thomas Sheehan of Indecision and Most Precious Blood, Strife, Dennis Lyxzén of Refused, Bryan Kienlen of the Bouncing Souls, Joe Principe of Rise Against, and Brandan Schieppati of Bleeding Through have cited the album as either an inspiration or an influence.

In The Blood and the Sweat: The Story of Sick of It All's Koller Brothers (2020), Lou said he found Blood, Sweat, and No Tears unlistenable because of Sick of It All's "weird" performances on the album, which he attributed to the band's limited studio experience prior to recording. He also believed fans who called it their favorite Sick of It All record liked the "era" surrounding it more than the album itself. In 2011, Sick of It All released their tenth album XXV Nonstop, which features re-recordings of "Rat Pack", "World Full of Hate" and "Injustice System". Sick of It All had contemplated re-recording Blood, Sweat, and No Tears in full prior to deciding they would only redo a certain amount of tracks, alongside those from their other albums. Lou considered the re-recorded tracks representative of how the originals would have sounded if the band had more time to record; "We played them at way better tempos, and everything just sounded better. We executed them much better." KRS-One reprised his appearance on the re-recording of "Clobberin' Time". According to Lou, KRS-One asked Sick of It All to send him three XXXL t-shirts and a copy of the finished album before doing his part; Lou does not remember whether the band fulfilled KRS-One's request.

In 2014, Sick of It All played both Blood, Sweat, and No Tears and their third album Scratch the Surface (1994) in their entireties at the Fun Fun Fun Fun Fest in Austin, Texas.

== Track listing ==
Blood, Sweat, and No Tears – Standard edition track listing
No.	Title	Length
1.	"The Blood and the Sweat"	1:51
2.	"Clobberin' Time/Pay the Price" (featuring KRS-One)	1:48
3.	"Give Respect"	1:10
4.	"Breeders of Hate"	1:55
5.	"Pushed Too Far"	0:58
6.	"Friends Like You"	1:09
7.	"Bullshit Justice"	1:32
8.	"Rat Pack"	0:47
9.	"Pete's Sake"	0:58
10.	"Stick Together"	0:53
11.	"G.I. Joe Headstomp"	1:19
12.	"Alone"	2:13
13.	"My Life"	0:44
14.	"World Full of Hate"	2:05
15.	"My Revenge"	1:22
16.	"No Labels"	1:01
17.	"Disillusion"	2:05
18.	"The Deal"	1:10
19.	"Injustice System"	2:21
Total length:		27:21

Notes

- Tracks 2, 3, 5, 6, 7, 9, 15 and 18 are re-recordings of the songs from Sick of It All's first EP, Sick of It All (1987).
- The original LP release featured 17 tracks compared to the 19 featured on the CD and cassette versions, omitting "Pete's Sake" and "Stick Together".

== Personnel ==
Personnel per liner notes.

Sick of It All
- Lou Koller – vocals, backing vocals (4)
- Rich Cipriano – bass
- Pete Koller – guitar
- Armand Majidi – drums, backing vocals (4)

Additional personnel

- KRS-One – spoken word intro (2)
- Sick of It All – backing vocals (1–3, 5–19)
- Craig Setari – backing vocals (1–3, 5, 6, 8–19)
- Howie Abrams – backing vocals (1–3, 5, 6, 8–19)
- Anthony – backing vocals (7)
- Paul – backing vocals (7)
Production
- Sick of It All – production
- Tom Soares – engineering, mixing
- Jaime Locke – assistant engineer
- Bryan Martin – remixing engineer
- Mike Rhode – remix assistant engineer (at Power Play)
- Chris Gehringer – mastering (at The Hit Factory)

Artwork

- David Bett – art direction
- Patricia Lie – design
- Tim Boiling Point – photography
- Dave Muller – photography
- Zack Muller – photography
- B.J. Papas – photography

== Bibliography ==
- "Voters' Guide to NAIRD's 1989 Indie Awards" (PDF). Billboard. Vol. 102, no. 22. June 2, 1990. p. 50. ISSN 0006-2510 – via worldradiohistory.com.
- Aswad, Jem; Sharp, Kevin (October 6, 1989). "Hard Rock: Rock Talk" (PDF). CMJ New Music Report. No. 180. p. 36. ISSN 0890-0795 – via worldradiohistory.com.
- Biese, Alex (December 14, 2018). "Life of Agony and Sick of It All joining forces". Asbury Park Press. p. J6. ProQuest 2158347773.
- Cecolini, Vinny (April 1997). "Over the Edge". Hit Parader. No. 391. Hit Parader Publications, Inc. p. 61. ISSN 0162-0266 – via Internet Archive.
- Garza, Janiss (August 12, 1989). "Metal Picks" (PDF). Cashbox. Vol. 53, no. 10. p. 9. ISSN 0008-7289 – via worldradiohistory.com.
- Garza, Janiss (January 1990). "Ear Candy". RIP. Vol. 4, no. 2. Larry Flynt Publications. p. 16. ISSN 0889-5791.
- Gitter, Mike (February 1989). "Sick of It All". Thrasher. Vol. 9, no. 2. p. 85. ISSN 0889-0692.
- Gitter, Mike (July 29, 1989). "Rekordz". Kerrang!. No. 249. Spotlight Publications. p. 28. ISSN 0262-6624.
- Ingham, Chris (2002). "Sick of It All". The Book of Metal. UK: London : Carlton. pp. 192–193. ISBN 9781842226834 – via Internet Archive.
- Ives, Brian (1999). "Sick of It All". In Graff, Gary; Durchholz, Daniel (eds.). MusicHound Rock: The Essential Album Guide. Visible Ink Press. p. 1013. ISBN 9781578590612 – via Internet Archive.
- Koller, Lou; Koller, Pete; Abrams, Howie (2020). The Blood and the Sweat: The Story of Sick of It All's Koller Brothers. Post Hill Press. ISBN 9781642932263.
- Macomber, Shawn (October 2012). "Dragons Awake: The Making of Sick of It All's 'Scratch the Surface'". Decibel. No. 92. Red Flag Media, Inc. pp. 63–72. ISSN 1557-2137.
- Larkin, Colin (2006). "Sick of It All". The Encyclopedia of Popular Music. Vol. 7. MUZE. pp. 441–442. ISBN 9780195313734 – via Internet Archive.
- Richard, John (December 1989). "All or Nothing". Metal Forces. No. 45. Force10 Publications. p. 49. OCLC 859210254.
- Robbins, Ira A. (1997). "Sick of It All". The Trouser Press Guide to '90s Rock. Simon & Schuster. p. 649. ISBN 978-0684814377 – via Internet Archive.
- Sciarretto, Amy, ed. (December 2007). "Hit Parader's Ultimate Hard Rock Top 10's". Hit Parader. No. 513. Magna Publishing Group. p. 64. ISSN 0162-0266 – via Internet Archive.
- Sharpe-Young, Garry (2005). New Wave of American Heavy Metal. Zonda Books Limited. ISBN 9780958268400 – via Google Books.
- Stratmann, Holger, ed. (1998). "Sick of It All". Rock Hard Enzyklopädie [Rock Hard Encyclopedia] (in German). Germany: Rock Hard GmbH. pp. 372–373. ISBN 9783980517102.
- Strong, Martin C. (1998). "Sick of It All". The Great Metal Discography. Canongate. p. 300. ISBN 9780862417277 – via Internet Archive.
- Williams, Carl (September 1989). "Sick of It All: Blood, Sweat and No Tears". Metal Forces. No. 42. Force10 Publications. p. 28. OCLC 859210254.
