= Sick of It All (EP) =

EP by Sick of It All
- Released: 1987
- Recorded: 1987
- Genre: Hardcore punk
- Length: 10:06
- Label: Revelation Records
- Producer: Sick of It All

Sick of It All chronology
Sick of It All (1987)	Blood, Sweat and No Tears (1989)

Sick of It All is the first 7-inch EP recording by New York hardcore punk band Sick of It All. It was the third-ever release via Revelation Records.

Initially, only 4,000 copies of the EP were manufactured (1,000 on standard black vinyl and 1,000 on red vinyl), followed by a limited numbered pressing of 300 copies earmarked for a record convention held at 924 Gilman Street in Berkeley, California, and then a final general-release press run of 2,000 copies. Afterwards, in 1988, eight of these songs were re-recorded and added to their first full-length album release, Blood, Sweat and No Tears, which is generally regarded as a landmark hardcore punk album.

Revelation reissued the EP on both vinyl and CD in 1997 to commemorate its 10th anniversary. SOIA lead singer Lou Koller contributed a special sleeve note to the reissue. The reissue vinyl was deliberately limited to 1,100 black vinyl copies and 102 grey vinyl copies. A final vinyl run of 300 white vinyl copies was released by Revelation in December 2001, and today only the CD edition remains in print.

== Track listing ==
=== 7-inch vinyl EP edition ===
==== Side one ====
1. "It's Clobberin' Time/Just Lies"
2. "Pete's Sake"
3. "Friends Like You"
4. "Bullshit Justice"

==== Side two ====
1. Pay the Price
2. Pushed Too Far/Give Respect
3. The Deal
4. N.S./My Revenge

=== 1997 CD edition ===
1. It's Clobberin' Time
2. Just Lies
3. Pete's Sake
4. Friends Like You
5. Bullshit Justice
6. Pay the Price
7. Pushed Too Far
8. Give Respect
9. The Deal
10. N.S./My Revenge
- The song title "It's Clobberin' Time" derives from the catchphrase made famous by the Marvel Comics character The Thing.

== Personnel ==
- Lou Koller – lead and backing vocals
- Pete Koller – guitars and backing vocals
- Rich Cipriano – bass guitar and backing vocals
- Armand Majidi – drums and backing vocals

Note

- On the EP, the band members were identified by their first names only and Majidi's given name is misspelled "Arman".

=== Production ===
- Bob Vandermark – recording and mixing engineer
- BJ Papas – photography
- Jeff Weinraub – artwork
