= Scratch the Surface =

Studio album by Sick of It All
- Released: October 18, 1994
- Studios: Normandy Sound (Warren, Rhode Island)
- Genre: Hardcore punk
- Length: 35:20
- Label: East West
- Producer: Sick of It All

Sick of It All chronology
Just Look Around (1992)	Scratch the Surface (1994)	Built to Last (1997)

Singles from Scratch the Surface
- 1. "Scratch the Surface / Borstal Breakout" Released: January 23, 1995

Scratch the Surface is the third studio album by the American hardcore punk band Sick of It All, released on October 18, 1994, by East West Records. It was the band's first album with bassist Craig Setari. Sick of It All self-produced the album and recorded it with engineer Tom Soares at Normandy Sound in Warren, Rhode Island. In writing the album, Sick of It All pursued a darker and heavier sound than that of their previous releases, which vocalist Lou Koller attributed to accusations of the band selling out following their move to East West, whilst drawing influence from a variety of heavy metal, speed metal, Oi! and hardcore bands.

Upon release, Scratch the Surface received generally favourable reviews from critics and peaked at number 67 on the German Albums charts. Sick of It All promoted the album for over two years, touring with Helmet, Korn, Orange 9MM, Quicksand, Strife and CIV, and performing on the inaugural Warped Tour in 1995. The album's title track was released as a double A-side single with "Borstal Breakout", reaching number 95 on the UK Singles Chart, whilst the music video for "Step Down" entered rotation on MTV. Although it failed to break Sick of It All into the mainstream, Scratch the Surface is the band's best-selling album, having sold 250,000 copies worldwide by 1997. Retrospectively described as a classic album, it has been credited with exposing hardcore to a wider audience; the band have also credited it with expanding their fanbase in Europe.

== Background and recording ==
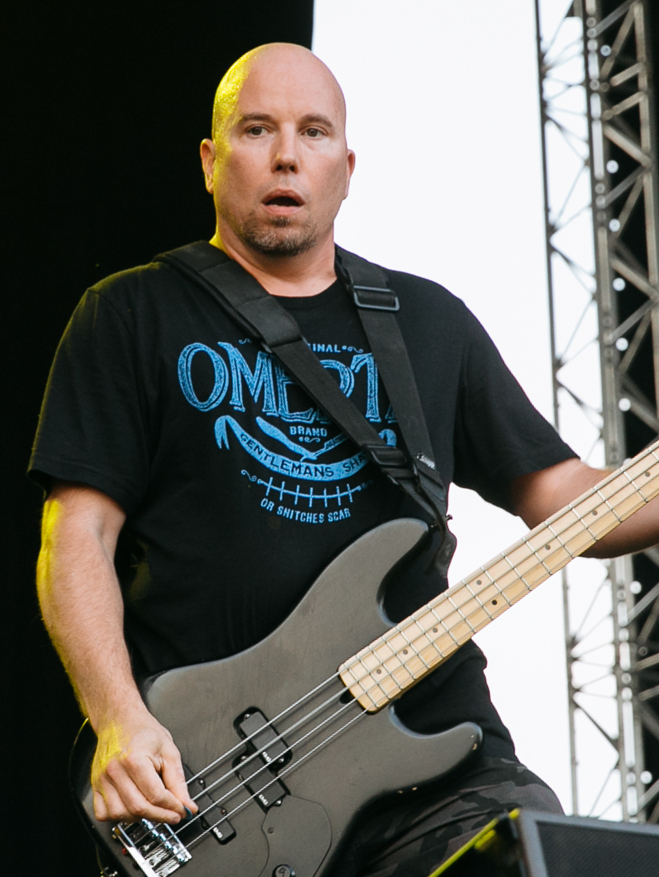
Scratch the Surface was Sick of It All's first album with bassist Craig Setari (pictured).

In 1992, Sick of It All released their second album, Just Look Around, through Relativity Records. Selling over 100,000 copies, it "catapulted the band to the top of the [hardcore] scene", according to Rock Hard. Bassist Rich Cipriano left Sick of It All following its release and was replaced by former Straight Ahead and Agnostic Front bassist Craig Setari. A longtime friend of the band, Setari had known the members of Sick of It All since 1982; he booked the band's first ever show, and assisted them during the recording of their debut album Blood, Sweat, and No Tears (1989), where he contributed lyrics to the songs "Bullshit Justice" and "The Blood and the Sweat". Setari said that when drummer Armand Majidi informed him of Cipriano's departure and asked him to join during Agnostic Front's final tour, "I just jumped in, no two ways about it, I was the guy."

Sick of It All were dissatisfied with Relativity's advertising and promotion of Just Look Around, even in its hometown New York City, and after playing a large show at the Palladium with Agnostic Front, Murphy's Law and the Lunachicks—which they had to promote themselves—the band asked to leave the label. Relativity subsequently attempted to sell the band's contract to other record labels for $20,000. Roadrunner Records, who distributed Just Look Around in Europe, was interested in signing the band at one point. Relativity eventually agreed to sell their contract to East West Records for $200,000; vocalist Lou Koller said that the label "added another zero" because East West was a major label. According to guitarist Pete Koller, East West signed both Sick of It All and Orange 9MM with the belief that they would be the "next big thing", and that hardcore music would emerge as "the next trend in heavier music". The band's contract guaranteed they had complete creative control over their work.

Sick of It All wrote Scratch the Surface in four months, rehearsing together six days a week in an open loft on Canal Street, Chinatown, which they shared with Rollins Band. The addition of Setari resulted in the album's writing process becoming the band's first in which all of its members collaborated on songwriting, as opposed to Lou writing lyrics and Pete writing music on their previous two albums. The band then recorded the album at Normandy Sound in Warren, Rhode Island, with engineer Tom Soares, whom had worked on all of their album's up to that point. Setari said that Soares got Sick of It All to record with greater precision than they had before and credited his advice with turning him into a professional musician. However, the band were dissatisfied by his attempts to mix the album, which they described as "slick" and "clean" and compared to 1980s hair metal. "We were trying to explain to him, 'This is us, we gotta sound like us', and he thought he was gonna push us into the realm of Metallica," Lou said. The band subsequently enlisted Billy Anderson to remix the album and "dirty it up". Pete said that where Soares would spend hours choosing sounds and effects, Anderson would "just crank shit". (Note: In The Blood and the Sweat: The Story of Sick of It All's Koller Brothers (2020), Pete recalled: "When Billy [Anderson] came in, we were doing 'Maladjusted' and were looking for an effect for Lou's voice. Tom [Soares] was like, 'We have this computer here and there's thousands of different distortions. Let's start with this one.' Billy goes, 'How about we do this?' and just grabs this knob on the giant fucking board and turns it to ten, and we're like, 'YEAH, it sounds great!' ") Lou believed that Soares was insulted by their enlistment of Anderson, whilst Pete said he was hurt by the decision. Despite this, the Koller brothers both considered "Consume", the sole track which Soares and Anderson mixed together, to be one of the strongest tracks on Scratch the Surface, with Lou believing that the album could have been "even better" had they had both mixed it together from the beginning. Anderson later toured with Sick of It All as its live sound engineer.

== Music and lyrics ==
=== Overview ===
Scratch the Surface is a hardcore punk album; John Franck of AllMusic described the album as featuring a "classic New York hardcore sound". Its songs feature heavy metal guitars, melodic basslines, thrash drumming and howled vocals. Carla Carioli of The Boston Phoenix felt that the album shared the "no-frills, no-melody, no-fear New Yrrrrk rage" of Sick of It All's prior releases but had more varied drumbeats and metal guitar tones. Ross Jones of The Guardian remarked that its sound was "polished" for the band, "but it still makes Mudhoney sound like Wilson Phillips".

According to Lou, Sick of It All tried to create "the heaviest and angriest record we could" from elements taken from the band's previous albums. In a 1995 interview with The Pit, he said that the band aimed to display their influences from heavy metal, speed metal, Oi! and hardcore bands, ranging from Agnostic Front, Discharge and GBH to early Venom, Motörhead, Iron Maiden and Judas Priest, on the album. Majidi also cited bands from the contemporary music scene in New York City whom he felt were "expanding people's ideas of what heavy music could be", such as Helmet, Chavez and Unsane, as influences. Lou believed that accusations of the band selling out following its signing with East West "unconsciously [...] pushed [them] toward a darker sound", stating in a 2011 interview with Terrorizer:

Before we'd even started writing, even our friends were like, 'oh, you guys are gonna have to come out with a big commercial record now' and we're like 'what are you talking about?' [...] in our minds we wrote as heavy and as dark as we could be at the time, just to show everybody we didn't change.

Lou and Majidi worked together on the lyrics of Scratch the Surface. Majidi said that the lyrics do not explore any particular themes, but are generally more introspective than on their previous releases. Carioli viewed the theme of "staying sane, safe and honest in a destructive, urban wasteland" as the album's "lyrical touchstone", whilst The Independent's Angela Lewis described its lyrics as "streetcore", meaning "no fascism, no woman-hating, no bad attitudes, and the world will be a better place".

=== Songs ===
Lou viewed "Insurrection" as Sick of It All's "version" of an Exploited and Discharge song. "Consume" features a "corrosive, stomping riff" and "abrasive sand-coated cries" from Lou. "Who Sets the Rules" is about judgmental people who look down on others "because they aren't the way [they] think they should be". "Goatless" was inspired by the media controversy surrounding Sick of It All following the 1992 Bard College at Simon's Rock shooting, due to perpetrator Wayne Lo wearing one of the band's t-shirts. Lou said the song was written by Majidi as the band's "final statement" on the matter: "If society didn't have scapegoats, then everyone would realize how fucked up it is [sic]." Steffen Chirazi of Kerrang! described the song as "Cro-Mags-esque". "Step Down" is an Oi!-influenced track featuring gang vocals, melodic elements and lyrics concerning underground integrity; Lou said that Sick of It All wanted to make people aware of those appropriating the values and looks of the hardcore scene. The band initially considered it to be "a funny little fool-around song" from a jam session and were surprised when East West said they wanted it to be released as a single with a music video. "Maladjusted" concerns "personal frustration" in how one interacts with others. Parts of the song were originally written by Setari for Agnostic Front, but "didn't work out". In an interview with Metal Hammer Germany, Majidi said the album's title track is about how "the whole hardcore concept [...] ends up being a trend" if one doesn't try to "find out what the music is really trying to tell you", and "superficial people who lead superficial lives". "Free Spirit" was the last song ever written by Straight Ahead. Setari said that although the song stayed the same musically, its lyrics and ending were reworked by Sick of It All. "Desperate Fool" is about castrating rapists, whilst "Farm Team" shares the same themes of "Step Down" in addressing inauthentic or financially motivated hardcore bands.

== Release and promotion ==
Scratch the Surface was released through East West in the United States on October 18, 1994, and in the United Kingdom on November 14, 1994. (Note: By the time of Scratch the Surface's release in the United Kingdom in November 1994, East West were still in the process of buying Sick of It All out of their contract with Relativity. In an interview with Kerrang!, Majidi said the band had a verbal agreement with the label but were yet to officially sign as they were still working on its "exact details", though expected it to be resolved by the time the album came out.) For the album cover, Sick of It All hired a photographer to carve the band's dragon logo into a block of wood before setting it aflame with lighter fluid and taking pictures of the whole process. "Somehow he managed to catch that perfect one we used", Lou said. The image featured on the CD presented the same block of wood after being hosed down. Its back cover photo shows Setari throwing a left hook at the camera, reflecting his exhaustion at the end of an hours-long band photoshoot session at five locations. Lou regretted the back photo, stating: "[N]obody told me moustaches weren't cool! I think we were just trying to show that we'd grown up." The album's release coincided with a merger between East West and Elektra Records, resulting in "confusion" surrounding Sick of It All's representation at the label. The label's European division promoted it heavily with posters, billboards and advertisements, though the band were frustrated with its comparatively lackluster promotion in the United States. In a December 1994 interview with the Scene Entertainment Weekly, Lou criticized East West for sending the album to chain stores first instead of mom-and-pop stores—which he said were just beginning to receive copies—as well as its initial CD retail price of US$14, which he found "pretty outrageous".

"Scratch the Surface" was serviced as the album's first single to metal and college radio stations. On January 23, 1995, the song was released as a double A-sided single with a cover of "Borstal Breakout" by Sham 69. "Step Down" and "Maladjusted" were also issued as promotional singles. East West financed music videos for "Scratch the Surface" and "Step Down". The former was filmed in Sick of It All's practice space and stars the band's friends. In an interview with Decibel, Lou said that the band aimed to make a performance video contrasting with contemporary hardcore videos—which he considered "mirror images of rap videos"—in that it was not focused solely on aggression and showed everyone involved having a "good time". He also said they wanted to show "that there are girls into heavier music." The video for "Step Down" starred Sandor Weisberger—a voice actor known for his work on radio dramas with Judson Fountain in the 1960s and 1970s—as a reporter investigating hardcore music, and includes parodies of various popular hardcore dancing styles. (Note: For Sandor Weisberger, see: Macomber 2012, p. 70. For video synopsis, see: Hill, Stephen 2019) Lou credited Pete with coming up with the video's concept, which he described as a "hardcore version" of the Soul Train line dance. The "Scratch the Surface" video debuted on MTV's Headbangers Ball on December 10, 1994, whilst the "Step Down" video—in a feat described as "previously unimaginable" by Stephen Hill of Metal Hammer UK—entered rotation on MTV. The video debuted on MTV's 120 Minutes in early 1995, and was also featured in the Beavis and Butt-Head episode "Premature Evacuation".

Sick of It All embarked on a worldwide tour in support for Scratch the Surface, touring North and South America, Europe, Japan, and New Zealand. In October 1994, the band toured with Strife for two weeks. In November, they supported Helmet and Quicksand across the United States, before playing ten shows with Black Train Jack in December. In January 1995, Sick of It All toured Europe and played four shows in the United Kingdom supported by Strife and Understand, before returning to the United States for a headlining tour with Korn, Orange 9MM and Trial that lasted until March 1995. Korn began to overshadow Sick of It All in popularity and media coverage during the tour, which Lou attributed to differences in label support and finances. Initially frustrated, he came to accept that the band were "simply not made for big success" following a conversation with Pete. Following a seven-week tour of Europe with CIV and a two-week tour of the United States with Quicksand and Orange 9MM, Sick of It All joined the inaugural edition of Warped Tour in August 1995. After two years of touring, East West told the band they were ready to begin work on a new album.

== Reception ==
=== Critical ===
Professional ratings
Review scores
Source	Rating
AllMusic	3/5 stars
The Boston Phoenix	2.5/4 stars
The Encyclopedia of Popular Music	3/5 stars
Kerrang!	5/5 stars
Metal Hammer Germany	6/7
MusicHound Rock	3/5 stars
Ox-Fanzine	4/5 stars
Raw	5/5 stars
Rock Hard	8.5/10
Select	2/5 stars

Scratch the Surface received generally favourable reviews upon its release. Chirazi of Kerrang! called it a "classic album" that "gives you nothing other than energy, entertainment and exciting, shifting volleys of aural aggro." Jan Jaedike of Rock Hard felt that the album's songs were individually stronger and catchier than they had been on Just Look Around. AllMusic critic John Franck selected "Step Down" as "Scratch the Surface" as the album's highlights, describing both tracks as "incredible band anthems". Less favourably, The Hartford Courant's Kenton Robinson criticized the album's songs as "unrelentingly samey", whilst Select's Clark Collis said it "tend[s] to revolve around incomprehensible, shouting, tuneless thrashings."

In The Trouser Press Guide to '90s Rock (1997), Ira Robbins described Scratch the Surface as "a blast of unreconstructed hardcore in a time and a place where such a thing was once impossible to imagine". Brian Ives, writing in the 1999 MusicHound Rock album guide, called the album proof that "major labels don't always force bands to mellow out; but why Atlantic would sign such a raw band remains a mystery." In a 2006 retrospective for Rock Sound, Andrew Kelham called the album the "high point of [Sick of It All]'s career and the ultimate silencer to those who doubted [the band's] integrity" following their signing to East West. Alistar Lawrence, writing for Kerrang! in 2011, similarly commented that it "proved that hardcore bands could poke their heads up above the parapet of the toilet circuit without selling out or diluting their sound one bit."

=== Commercial ===
Scratch the Surface peaked at number 67 on the German Offizielle Top 100 Albums chart, whilst the "Scratch the Surface / Borstal Breakout" single reached number 95 on the UK Singles Chart. In a 1997 interview with Metal Hammer UK, Lou said that the album had sold 250,000 copies worldwide; journalist Ian Winwood described its sales figures as "respectable" given Sick of It All's relative lack of accessibility compared to their contemporaries Green Day or Rancid. Equal Vision Records, whom handled its release on vinyl, sold around 4,000 copies of the album. As of 2011, it is the band's best selling album. Despite the greater attention surrounding its release, the album failed to break Sick of It All into the mainstream. Franck believed that East West's attempts to make Sick of It All the "next big punk band" failed because radio programmers were more interested in acts like Green Day. The band parted ways with East West following the release of its fourth album Built to Last (1997), which Mörat of Terrorizer considered representative of the limited "commercial viability of hardcore".

== Legacy ==
Scratch the Surface is retrospectively described as a classic album. The album was inducted into the Decibel "Hall of Fame" in 2012, with writer Shawn Macomber calling it a "hardcore magnum opus" that transcended "the standards of any and all subsets of extreme music", as evidenced by covers of its songs by Napalm Death and Sepultura on the Sick of It All tribute album Our Impact Will Be Felt (2007). According to Mike Hill of Vice, Scratch the Surface "took NYHC worldwide" and turned Sick of It All into "the closest the hardcore scene has to a household name." Stephen Hill of Metal Hammer UK credited the album and the "Step Down" music video with helping expose hardcore to a wider audience and giving the genre its "first momentous steps" to eventual mainstream acceptance. Raw listed it as one of the 90 essential albums of the 1990s (1995), whilst Terrorizer listed it as one of the 100 most important of the decade (2000). Kerrang! included Scratch the Surface in their "666 Albums You Must Hear Before You Die" list (2011); in 2018, the magazine called it one of the "defining albums" of New York Hardcore, alongside Built to Last.

Chris Carrabba of Dashboard Confessional and Frank Turner both credited Scratch the Surface with introducing them to hardcore music. Chris Rawson of Walls of Jericho and Chad Gilbert of New Found Glory also cited it as an album that changed their lives. Davey Havok of AFI viewed the album as an "unparraleled classic" whose influence "reaches far beyond the hardcore scene". Alan Williamson of LostAlone listed it as one of his favourite albums. Al Barr of Dropkick Murphys and Ben Koller of Converge and Mutoid Man both considered Scratch the Surface to be one of the best hardcore albums of all time. Gallows bassist Stuart Gili-Ross called it the best hardcore album released after 1990 and "the best NYHC [album] of all time"; he also cited "Maladjusted" as the reason he "[wanted] to play bass in a hardcore band." In 2024, readers of Revolver voted the album as the second-greatest NYHC album of all time, behind the Cro-Mags' The Age of Quarrel (1986). In 2025, it was ranked fifth on a similar poll of the best hardcore albums of all time by Alternative Press.

In a 2012 interview with Decibel, Pete said that he considered Scratch the Surface to be Sick of It All's most important album as it "pushed [the band] up into the higher realm" of songwriting and popularity, whilst Majidi saw it as the band's "quintissential album [...] that we are always forced to try to top." The Koller brothers have credited the album with expanding Sick of It All's fanbase in Europe, where people "came and checked it out and stayed with us forever," according to Lou. Pete called it the reason "we can play a Monday night show in Colonge, Germany and there'll be 900 people [there]." "Step Down" became a staple of Sick of It All's concerts, and is regarded as a "integral part" of the band's shows. In 2011, the band re-recorded the title track for their tenth album XXV Nonstop. In 2014, Sick of It All performed the album and Blood, Sweat, and No Tears in their entireties at the Fun Fun Fun Fun Fest in Austin, Texas. The band received several festival offers to celebrate the 30th anniversary of Scratch the Surface in 2024, and were due to perform a set dedicated to the album at Wacken Open Air in August of that year, which was cancelled after Lou was diagnosed with esophageal cancer in June.

== Track listing ==
All songs are written by Sick of It All.

Standard release
No.	Title	Length
1.	"No Cure"	2:58
2.	"Insurrection"	1:50
3.	"Consume"	3:42
4.	"Who Sets the Rules"	2:45
5.	"Goatless"	1:21
6.	"Step Down"	3:15
7.	"Maladjusted"	2:25
8.	"Scratch the Surface"	2:51
9.	"Free Spirit"	1:53
10.	"Force My Hand"	2:28
11.	"Desperate Fool"	1:52
12.	"Return to Reality"	2:43
13.	"Farm Team"	2:22
14.	"Cease Fire"	2:58

1994 Vinyl bonus tracks (EVR 23)
No.	Title	Writer(s)	Length
15.	"Straight Ahead" (Straight Ahead cover)	Tommy Carroll; Craig Setari	0:54
16.	"Borstal Breakout" (Sham 69 cover)	Jimmy Pursey; Dave Parsons	2:01

== Personnel ==
Adapted from liner notes.

Sick of It All
- Lou Koller - vocals
- Pete Koller - guitars
- Craig Setari - bass
- Armand Majidi - drums

Production

- Sick of It All - production
- Don Fury - production, engineering (16)
- Billy Anderson - mixing
- Tom Soares - engineering, mixing (3)
- Fred Bortoloti - assistant engineering
- Howie Weinberg - mastering
Additional musicians
- Fred Bortoloti - backing vocals
- Billy Anderson - backing vocals
- Timothy Shaw - backing vocals
- Brian BTJ - backing vocals

Artwork

- Thomas Bricker - art direction
- BJ Papes - photography

== Charts ==
Chart performance for Scratch the Surface
Chart (1995)	Peak position
German Albums (Offizielle Top 100)	67

== Release history ==
Release history for Scratch the Surface
Region	Label	Format	Date	Catalog #	Ref.
United States	East West	CD; CS	October 18, 1994	92422-2	
United States	Equal Vision	LP	October 18, 1994	EVR023	
United Kingdom	East West	CD; CS; LP	November 14, 1994	7567-92422-2	
Various	Music on Vinyl	LP	February 17, 2014	MOVLP992	
