= Based on a True Story (Sick of It All album) =

Studio album by Sick of It All
- Released: April 20, 2010
- Recorded: October–November 2009 at Starstruck Studio in Copenhagen, Denmark
- Genre: Hardcore punk
- Length: 33:31
- Label: Century Media
- Producer: Tue Madsen

Sick of It All chronology
Death to Tyrants (2006)	Based on a True Story (2010)	XXV Nonstop (2011)

Based on a True Story is the ninth studio album by New York hardcore band Sick of It All. It was released on April 20, 2010, on the band's new label Century Media Records (though Abacus, their previous label, was a subsidiary of Century Media). It was the band's first album in four years, following the release of Death to Tyrants in 2006, the longest gap between albums in Sick of It All's career. Based on a True Story was also available as an extremely limited German import-only version that was packaged with a DVD titled New York Vs. London. The DVD, which was recorded, edited, and produced by Universal Warning Records, features a 5-camera shoot of 3 songs from a sold-out show in New York City from January 2008 – and a 3-camera shoot from a sold-out 2008 show in London. There is also a 15-minute European tour documentary that glues the program together.

== Background and recording ==
The band worked with producer Tue Madsen, who produced the band’s previous album Death to Tyrants. With Death to Tyrants, Madsen went to the band's native New York to produce the album. However, with Based on a True Story, Sick of It All traveled to Madsen’s hometown of Copenhagen, Denmark to work on the album. This was due to Madsen telling the band, "If you come to Denmark, I’ll do what I did in Death to Tyrants but make it ten times bigger." Prior to going to Denmark, the band rehearsed on their own in New York and then sent a demo of their ideas to Madsen. The recording process for the album was quick with drummer Armand Majidi recording all the drum tracks in a day and a half, in total the band spent three and a half weeks in Denmark.

Lead singer Lou Koller stated that with this record the band wanted to sound heavier without sounding metal. "Tue Madsen would say to us when we were doing Death To Tyrants, “You guys are way heavier live than on any of your records. I want to take that…that’s what I want to make Sick Of It All sound like. And we did it on Death to Tyrants and he perfected it tenfold on this one."

Due to most of the songs being based on thing that happened to the band members growing up and the experiences they had, Lou Koller came up with the title Based on a True Story and the rest of the band thought it was a good titled.

When asked if it was a concept album drummer Majid stated "It kind of came out looking that way because of the booklet and everything, but each song has its own meaning. They’re not really connected in any way, there’s no theme that runs throughout. So, it’s not a concept album."

== Critical reception ==
Professional ratings
Review scores
Source	Rating
AllMusic	4/5 stars
AntiMusic	5/5
Metal.de	8/10
Ultimate Guitar	7/10

Gregory Heaney of AllMusic wrote "Based on a True Story has everything that fans will have come to expect from the band after a quarter-century, making this album a kind of old-school hardcore comfort food for punk rockers. While Sick of It All may not be reinventing the wheel, they are showing that they’re still making the same high quality wheel they’ve always made." Metal.de praised the album for not being commercialized stating "you know exactly what you’re getting, and their music has consistently maintained a high standard from the very beginning. "Based On A True Story" is no exception. A must-listen."

== Track listing ==
1. "Death or Jail" - 2:51
2. "The Divide" - 2:50
3. "Dominated" - 2:09
4. "A Month of Sundays" - 2:34
5. "Braveheart" - 0:45
6. "Bent Outta Shape" - 1:53
7. "Lowest Common Denominator" - 2:18
8. "Good Cop" - 2:28
9. "Lifeline" - 2:34
10. "Watch It Burn" - 2:34
11. "Waiting for the Day" - 2:25
12. "Long as She's Standing" - 2:34
13. "Nobody Rules" - 2:39
14. "Dirty Money" - 2:57

== Credits ==
- Lou Koller – vocals
- Pete Koller – guitar
- Craig Setari – bass guitar
- Armand Majidi – drums

== Charts ==
Charts (2010)	Peak position
Belgium (Ultratop)	56
France (SNEP)	162
Germany (GFK entertainment)	40
US Heatseekers (Billboard)	47
