= Call to Arms (Sick of It All album) =

Studio album by Sick of It All
- Released: February 23, 1999
- Recorded: Big House (New York City)
- Genre: Heavy hardcore
- Length: 32:55
- Label: Fat Wreck Chords
- Producers: Sick of It All & John Seymour

Sick of It All chronology
Built to Last (1997)	Call to Arms (1999)	Yours Truly (2000)

Call to Arms is the fifth full-length studio album from American hardcore punk band Sick of It All. It was the band's first full-length release on Fat Wreck Chords and follows the 1998 EP, Potential for a Fall.

== Critical reception ==
Professional ratings
Review scores
Source	Rating
AllMusic	3/5 stars
Chronicles of Chaos	9/10
The Encyclopedia of Popular Music	2/5 stars
Lollipop Magazine	Positive
Pitchfork	9.0/10

The A.V. Club called the album "packed with all the sturm und drang of its previous releases, bearing the hallmarks of virtually all good hardcore: breakneck speed, heavy guitar riffs, and shouting that would be unintelligible were it not for the lyric sheet." CMJ New Music Report wrote that the songs "come from the gut — anthems in the truest sense, flexing championship muscles that have been pumped up by working class bravado and street punk pride."

== Track listing ==
All tracks written by Sick of It All.

1. "Let Go" – 1:09
2. "Call to Arms" – 1:48
3. "Potential for a Fall" – 2:28
4. "Falter" – 1:13
5. "The Future Is Mine" – 2:04
6. "Guilty" – 1:32
7. "Falling Apart" – 2:03
8. "Sanctuary" – 1:55
9. "Morally Confused" – 1:50
10. "Hindsight" – 2:27
11. "Martin" – 2:46
12. "Pass the Buck" – 1:27
13. "Quiet Man" – 2:40
14. "Drastic" – 1:23
15. "(Just A) Patsy" – 6:10*

*at the end of the album, there is a hidden track called "Greezy Wheezy". The band has also played it several times live and the video of it can be seen on the movie Sick of It All: The Story So Far.

== Credits ==
- Lou Koller – vocals
- Pete Koller – guitar
- Craig Setari – bass guitar
- Armand Majidi – drums
- Recorded at Big House, New York City
- Produced by Sick of It All and John Seymour
- Engineered by John Seymour

== Charts ==
Chart (1999)	Peak position
Germany (GfK Entertainment)	56
UK Independent (Official Charts)	47
