= The Story So Far (2001 film) =

2001 film by Brant Sersen

- Directed by: Brant Sersen
- Starring: Sick of It All; Fat Wreck Chords; Dicky Barrett; NOFX
- Distributed by: Fat Wreck Chords
- Release date: April 21, 2001
- Running time: 60 minutes
- Country: United States
- Language: English
- Budget: $10,000 (estimated)

Sick of It All: The Story So Far is a 2001 American documentary film about the punk band Sick of It All. It was directed by Brant Sersen.

== Cast ==
- Dicky Barrett
- Gary "Chops" MacConnie
- CIV (band)
- H_{2}O (band)
- John Joseph
- Lou Koller – Sick of It All – vocals
- Pete Koller – Sick of It All – guitars
- Armand Majidi – Sick of It All – drums
- NOFX (band)
- Rancid (band)
- Craig Setari – Sick of It All – bass
