= Craig Setari =

American bassist

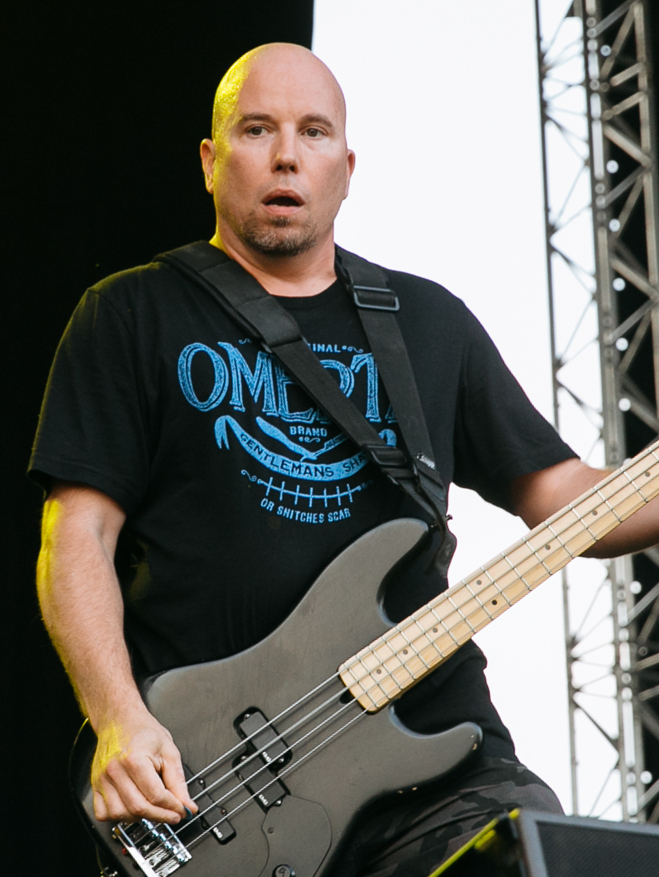
- Setari performing with Sick of It All in 2015

Background information
- Origin: New York, U.S.
- Genres: Hardcore punk
- Occupations: Musician, former boxer
- Instrument: Bass
- Years active: 1985–present
- Member of: Sick of It All
- Formerly of: Youth of Today; Agnostic Front; Cro-Mags; Straight Ahead; Rest in Pieces

Craig Setari (sometimes known by the stage name Craig Ahead) is an American musician who is the bass player of the hardcore punk band Sick of It All. He has also worked with many other hardcore bands, including Youth of Today, Straight Ahead, Rest in Pieces, Agnostic Front and Cro-Mags. Alongside Dan Lilker, he recorded the Noise for Noise's Sake demo tape under the name Crab Society. This demo tape inspired Lilker's band S.O.D. to record their 1985 demo album titled Crab Society North.

== Biography ==
Craig Setari grew up in what he described as a poor household with his mother and older brother. He first began listening to rock and heavy metal music at the age of twelve, through his older brother Scott and his friend Dan Lilker. One day, Lilker gifted Scott a bass, so that he could learn the instrument and join an early iteration of Anthrax. When Scott wasn't using the instrument, Craig would begin to teach himself how to play it. Within the next two years, Craig Setari would progress to listening to hardcore punk. Despite not having much money Setari’s mother made sure Setari had rudimentary gear (bass and cord) and she and his older brother would give him money so he could take the bus to attend rehearsals.

=== NYC Mayhem ===
This inspired him to join the band Straight Ahead in 1984, with Gordon Ancis and Tommy Carroll, however the band would change its name to NYC Mayhem soon after his joining. NYC Mayhem would release their debut EP We Stand in 1985 and then break up in late-1985, leading Setari to briefly join Youth of Today as their bassist where he played on their 1986 album Break Down the Walls. NYC Mayhem reformed in late-1986 under the name Straight Ahead, this time with Sick of It All's Armand Majidi on drums, They released their sophomore EP, Breakaway. On the Hardlore podcast bassist Setari confirmed Straight Ahead would play two shows in Brooklyn on April 25th and 26th of 2026 as support of Gorilla Biscuits.

=== Agnostic Front and Rest in Pieces ===
In 1987, Setari auditioned for Murphy’s Law, following the audition he got a call from Agnostic Front guitarist Vinnie Stigma who told him that he had lost the audition to Chuck Valle. But Stigma then offered him a spot in Agnostic Front who had just released Liberty and Justice For... Setari then joined the band replacing their bassist Alan Peters. During his stint in Agnostic Front, he recorded one album with them One Voice which was released in 1992, he left the band the following year.

Agnostic Front singer Roger Miret was arrested in 1989, leading to the band going on a hiatus. During this time Setari would play bass in fellow New York hardcore band Rest in Pieces with his old Straight Ahead bandmate Armand Majidi.

=== Sick of It All ===
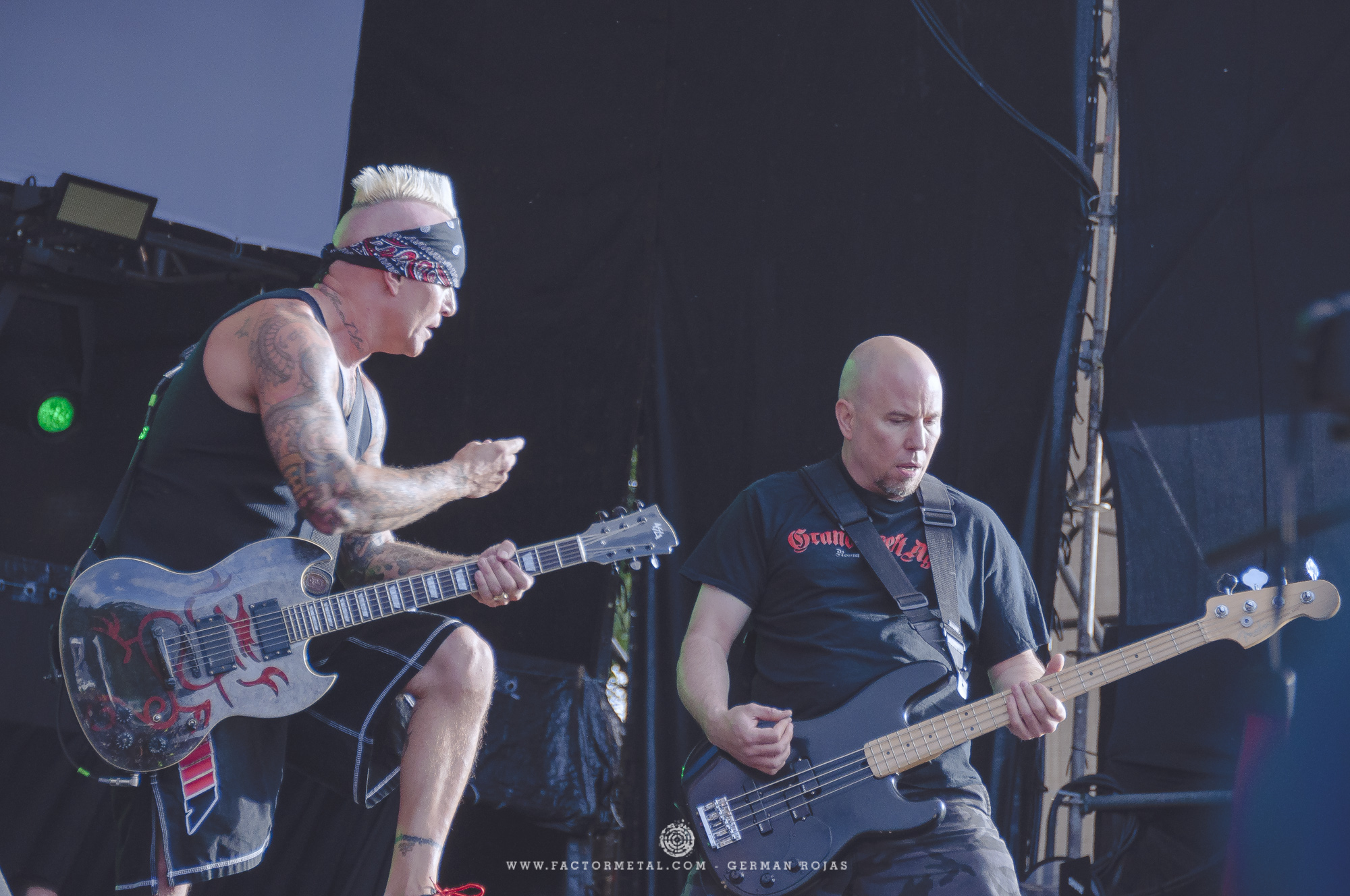
Setari with Pete Koller at Rock Al Parque 2016

Setari joined Sick of It All in 1993, after leaving Agnostic Front. Setari had history with the band prior to joining as he booked their first ever show in 1986, at the Right Track Inn in Long Island, supporting Youth of Today. He made his recording debut with in the band in 1994, on their breakthrough album Scratch the Surface. Setari has remained with Sick of It All, helping to write tracks such as "Built to Last," which was the first New York hardcore punk track to enter the U.S. Top 100. In total he has recorded 10 albums with the band the most recent being 2018’s Wake the Sleeping Dragon!.

=== Cro-Mags and Bloodclot ===
In 2008, when John Joseph and Mackie Jayson began playing shows under the Cro-Mags again they recruited Setari to play bass. He played with the band on and off from 2008 till 2019. Setari later joined Joseph’s other hardcore band Bloodclot releasing the album Souls in 2022.

=== Martial arts ===
Outside of Music Setari has a background in martial arts and is a former competitive boxer. When he is not on the road touring he trains both boxing and muay thai.

== Style and influences ==
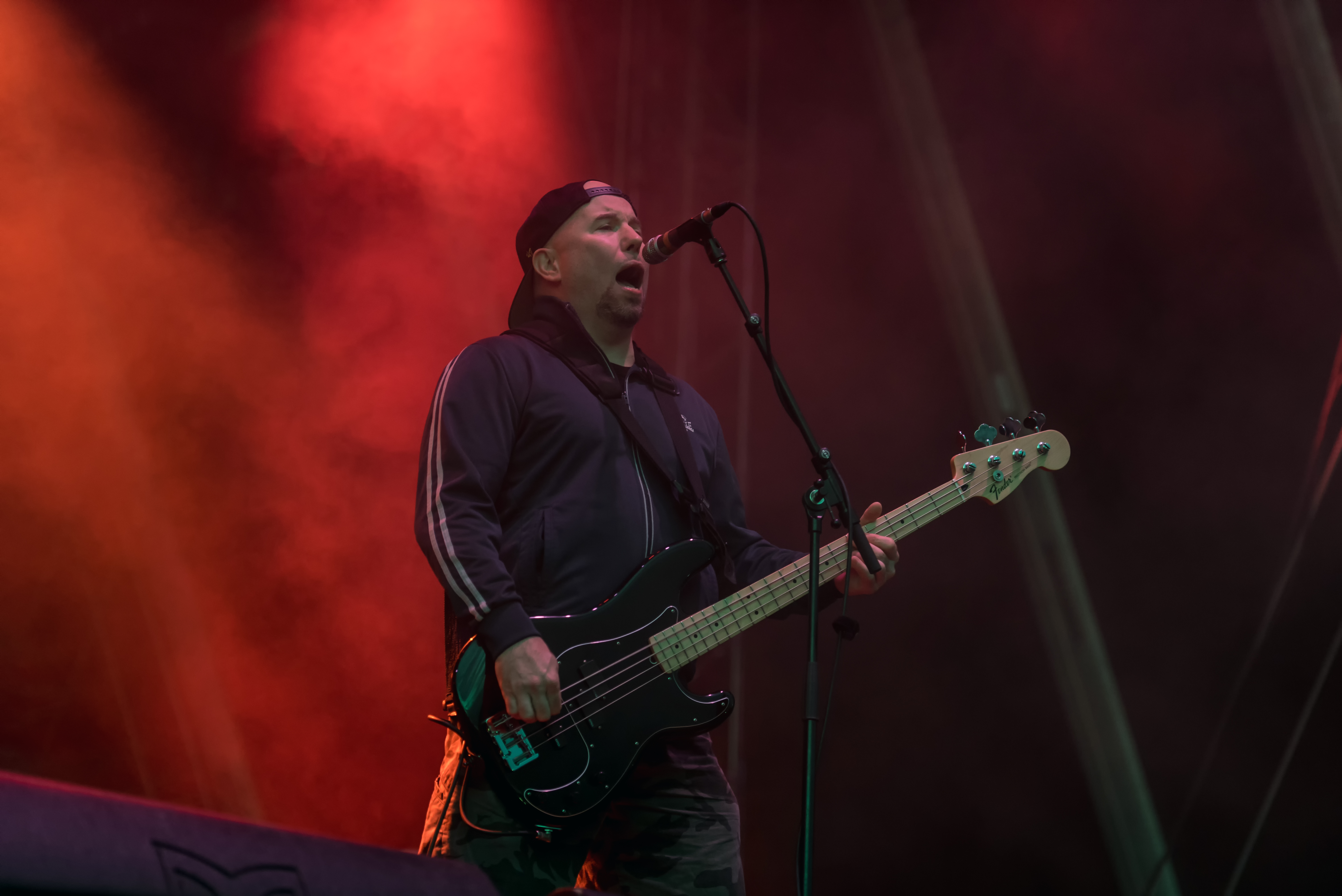
Setari in 2018

When asked on his picking style Setari stated:

I have my own unique style of picking, sometimes it is sharp downstrokes but very often for particular rhythms with particular drummers—Mackie Jayson, for example—I will do what I have termed “pulse picking,“ which is a variation of downstrokes with upstrokes on the snare to emphasize and give a real pushing pocket to a beat that has a strong push.

Setari uses a guitar pick when he plays hardcore, but when plays with non hardcore musicians he opts to use his fingers. Some of his influences on bass include James Jamerson, Geezer Butler, John Entwistle, Daryl Jennifer, Steve Harris, and Danny Lilker.

== Discography ==
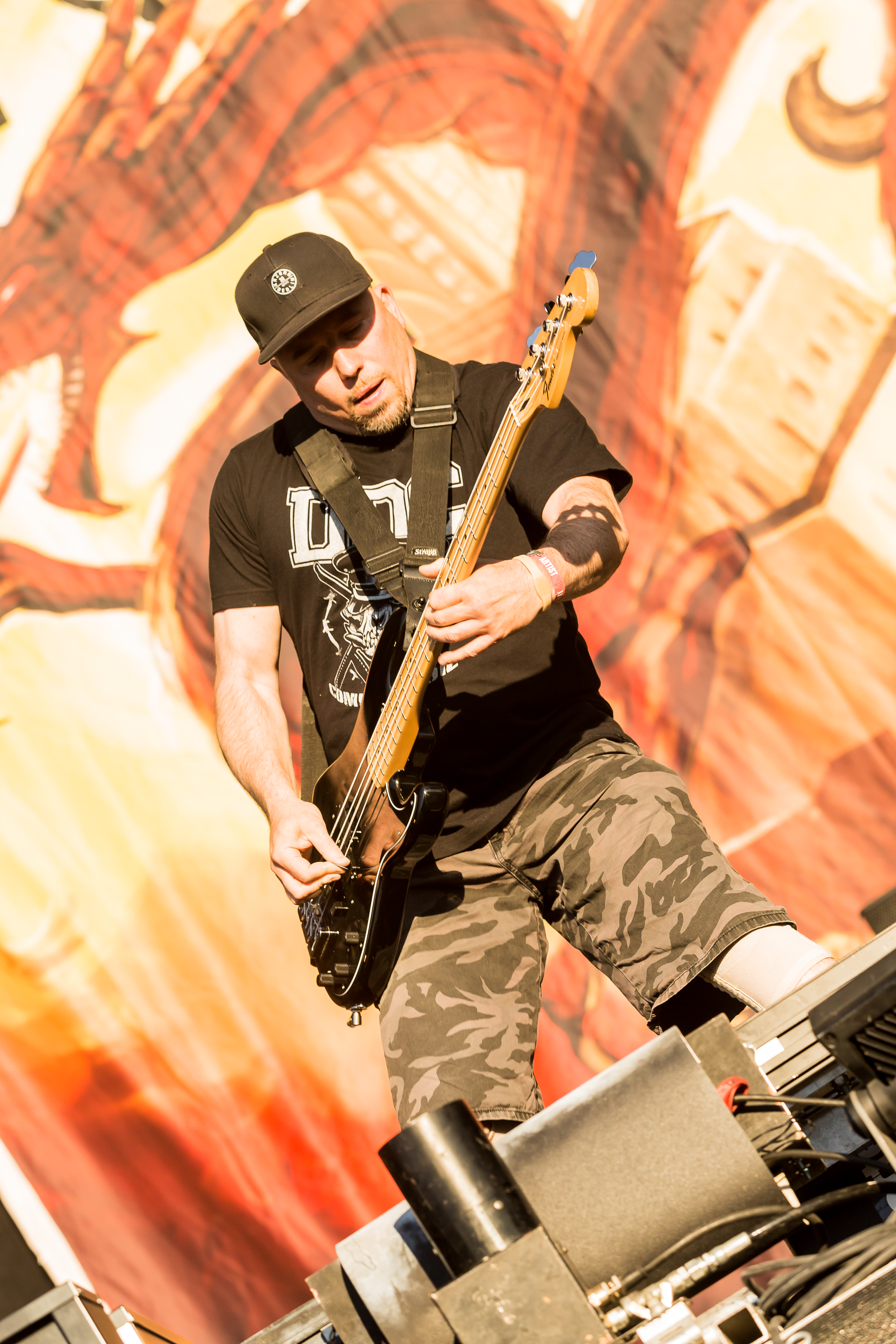
Setari with Full Force 2019

=== With Straight Ahead ===
EPs

- We Stand (1985)
- Breakaway (1987)

Demos

- Mayhemic Destruction (1985)
- Violence (1985)

=== With Youth of Today ===
- Break Down the Walls (1986)

=== With Rest in Pieces ===
- Under My Skin (1990)

=== With Agnostic Front ===
- One Voice (1992)

=== With Sick of It All ===
- Scratch the Surface (1994)
- Built to Last (1997)
- Call to Arms (1999)
- Yours Truly (2000)
- Life on the Ropes (2003)
- Death to Tyrants (2006)
- Based on a True Story (2010)
- XXV Nonstop (2011)
- The Last Act of Defiance (2014)
- Wake the Sleeping Dragon! (2018)

=== With Creep Division ===
- Creep Division (2000)

=== Bloodclot ===
- Souls (2022)
