= Wake the Sleeping Dragon! =

Studio album by Sick of It All
- Released: November 2, 2018
- Studio: Nova Studio
- Genre: Hardcore punk
- Length: 32:57
- Labels: Fat Wreck Chords (US and Canada); Century Media (EU)
- Producer: Jerry Farley

Sick of It All chronology
When the Smoke Clears (2016)	Wake the Sleeping Dragon! (2018)

Professional ratings
Review scores
Source	Rating
FestivalInfo	4/5 stars
Live Reviewer	4.5/5 stars
LouderSound.com	4/5 stars
Maximum Volume Music	9/10 stars
Metalfan.nl	8.5/10 stars
Punknews.org	4.5/5 stars
RockMuzine	8/10 stars

Wake the Sleeping Dragon! is the twelfth full-length album by American hardcore punk band Sick of It All. It was released on November 2, 2018 by Fat Wreck Chords in the United States (on CD and vinyl) and in Canada (on vinyl) and by Century Media Records in Europe (both on CD and vinyl). Wake the Sleeping Dragon! is the band's first release on Fat Wreck Chords in 15 years. This is the final studio album to feature Lou Koller on vocals, due to his death on July 24, 2026.

== Recording and promotion ==
On February 28, 2018, it was announced Sick of It All had begun working on a new album at Nova Studio in Staten Island, New York. The band spent two and a half weeks with producer Jerry Farley. While Danish producer Tue Madsen mixed and mastered the album at Antfarm Studios in Aabyhøj, Denmark. The recording process was smooth this was in part due to Farley’s early involvement, with two five-day pre-production sessions, along with the ability to record as Sick Of It All progressed on their songwriting.

It was later announced the band had re-signed with Fat Wreck Chords who the band had previously been signed to in the late 1990s and early 2000s. Fat Wreck Chords released the album in North America while Century Media released it in Europe.

The album was announced by Sick of It All in August 2018. The first song of the upcoming album, "Inner Vision", was released the same month. A second song, the title track "Wake the Sleeping Dragon", was released in October 2018. A lyric video for this song was released a few days later. A day after the official release of Wake the Sleeping Dragon!, a music video for "That Crazy White Boy Shit" was released. A music video for "Self Important Shithead" was released in July 2019. In June of 2020 a music video for the song “Bulls Anthem” was released, the video was made entirely from clips that fans submitted of them singing the song.

== Writing ==
When it came to writing new material the band mutually agreed to write something they enjoyed, instead of chasing trends or trying to change their sound. All four members of the band contributed both musically and lyrically to the album. Singer Lou Koller described it as one of the most "free records" the band ever did not forcing themselves to write rigidly.

the album title Wake the Sleeping Dragon! refers to a protest mechanism. In an interview Drummer Armand Majidi stated "On this record, we had a more open, communal, tongue-in-cheek approach to lyric writing,” “So many different topics were covered, some way more lighthearted than others. We’ve done ‘serious’ so often, that what might stand out most to people is how much fun we had with the lyrics. It’s always time for revolution, so that message is loud and clear on multiple songs."

As for some of the song meanings he added

"We also sing about musical heroes like the Bad Brains (‘That Crazy White Boy Shit’), inner demons (‘The Snake (Break Free.)’), our distaste of animal abuse (‘Bull’s Anthem’), annoying narcissism on social media, friends we’ve lost, life on the road, impending wars for resources, as well as mosh pit patterns that can be linked to male pattern baldness. We’ve allowed ourselves greater lyrical freedom on this record for sure." The songs "Hardcore Horseshoe" and "Beef Between Vegans" where written with a more humorous tone.

Jerry Farley produced the record Majidi gave Farley credit stating "This is the first time we’ve ever had a producer involved from start to finish, including the songwriting process. His objective viewpoints helped settle a lot of little issues that could have easily become stumbling blocks, and the songs themselves ended up benefitting from them."

== Album cover ==
The album cover was designed by Ernie Parada who had done work on the band’s previous two records. He alongside lead singer Lou Koller came up with the idea to make it look 50s era monster movie poster, while also using the bands Alleyway Dragon mascot. Majidi added “Lou and Ernie came up with the idea of doing monster-movie styled art as the cover,” “The dragon climbing the Empire State was a concept I always wanted to see brought to life, so the two ideas were destined to come together this way.”

== Critical reception ==
The album was met with very positive reception, Stephen Hill of Metal Hammer wrote ‘They’ve never sounded better’ Tom of Punknews added “Wake the Sleeping Dragon! is not sensitive, subtle, nuanced singer songwriter fare. It’s aggressive, angry and in your face. In other words, it’s exactly what hardcore should be.” Jack from Cryptic rock wrote “Thick Hardcore riffs and insistent vocals drive this album, and it manages to keep an insane momentum in spite of such a hefty track list. There are few, if any, dull moments. It is great to see a band with such a storied history still producing records of this caliber. With Wake the Sleeping Dragon, Sick of It All have proved unequivocally that they still belong at the forefront of Hardcore.” New Noise Magazine added "this new record won’t disappoint. They aren’t reveling in their relative old age, writing songs that reflect complacency or self-satisfaction. Their tracks are just as short and blistering as ever, and tackle some serious current events on songs like "That Crazy White Boy Shit," "Self Important Shithead," and "The New Slavery."

== Track listing ==
1. "Inner Vision" - 1:54
2. "That Crazy White Boy Shit" - 2:05
3. "The Snake (Break Free)" - 1:58
4. "Bull's Anthem" - 2:02
5. "Robert Moses Was a Racist" - 1:29
6. "Self Important Shithead" - 0:58
7. "To the Wolves" - 1:40
8. "Always with Us" - 2:26
9. "Wake the Sleeping Dragon" - 2:02
10. "2+2" - 1:49
11. "Beef Between Vegans" - 2:12
12. "Hardcore Horseshoe" - 1:53
13. "Mental Furlough" - 2:17
14. "Deep State" - 1:53
15. "Bad Hombres" - 2:01
16. "Work the System" - 1:46
17. "The New Slavery" - 2:39

== Performers ==
- Lou Koller – vocals
- Pete Koller – guitars
- Craig Setari – bass
- Armand Majidi – drums

Guest performers

- Chuck Ragan (“Bulls Anthem”)
- Tim McIlrath (“Bulls Anthem”)

Technical

- Jerry Farley — producer
- Tue Madsen — mixing and mastering
- Ernie Parada — album cover
- Michelle Kiela and Jonathan Buske — artwork

== Charts ==
Chart (2019)	Peak position
Austria (O3)	65
Belgium Flanders (Ultratop)	94
Belgium Wallonia (Ultratop)	99
Germany (GFK Entertainment)	31
Switzerland (Swiss Hitparade)	51
UK Rock and Metal (Official Charts)	18
US Heatseekers Albums (Billboard)	17
