= Built to Last (Sick of It All album) =

1997 studio album by Sick of It All

Studio album by Sick of It All
- Released: February 11, 1997
- Recorded: 1996 at Sound City Studios, Van Nuys, California, Entourage Studios, Los Angeles, California and Normandy Sound, Warren, Rhode Island
- Length: 39:15
- Labels: East West Records, Equal Vision Records
- Producers: GGGarth, Sick of It All

Sick of It All chronology
Scratch the Surface (1995)	Built to Last (1997)	Call to Arms (1999)

Professional ratings
Review scores
Source	Rating
AllMusic	3/5 stars
The Encyclopedia of Popular Music	3/5 stars
Metal Hammer	4/5 stars
MusicHound Rock: The Essential Album Guide	2.5/5 stars
Punknews.org	4.5/5 stars

Built to Last is the fourth studio album by American band Sick of It All, released in 1997. Equal Vision Records held the exclusive rights to release it on vinyl.

The album peaked at No. 32 on the Billboard Heatseekers Albums chart.

== Production ==
Built to Last was the result of a year's work for Sick of It All, with pre-production beginning in late 1995/early 1996. The recording took place at Normandy Sound, in Warren, Rhode Island (where their first three albums had been recorded), and in two studios in California.

== Critical reception ==
The Washington Post wrote that "the music and attitude are entirely predictable, but the 'hey-hey-heys' are rather charming." Entertainment Weekly wrote that the band manages "to overcome the genre’s bark-and-lunge cliches simply because they’re so archetypal; these guys can actually make you feel the fury behind a song called 'Us Vs. Them'."

== Track listing ==
All tracks are written by Sick of It All.

No.	Title	Length
1.	"Good Lookin' Out"	1:53
2.	"Built to Last"	2:01
3.	"Closer"	2:56
4.	"One Step Ahead"	2:07
5.	"Us vs. Them"	3:04
6.	"Laughingstock"	2:42
7.	"Don't Follow"	2:02
8.	"Nice"	2:41
9.	"Busted"	1:37
10.	"Burn 'Em Down"	2:55
11.	"End the Era"	3:05
12.	"Chip Away"	2:02
13.	"Too Late"	2:00
14.	"Jungle"	8:10
Total length:		39:15

Notes

- "Jungle" ends at 2:54, with silence from 2:55 to 5:53; at 5:54, a voice says "Oh c'mon, hurry up, ya old hag." There is silence again from 5:58 to 6:59. A hidden song, sung in English and Spanish, starts at 7:00 (unofficially titled "Culo Con Cado").

== Credits ==
- Lou Koller – vocals
- Pete Koller – guitar
- Craig Setari – bass guitar
- Armand Majidi – drums
- George Correia – percussion
- Produced by GGGarth and Sick of It All
- Engineered by GGGarth and Greg Fidelman

== Charts ==
Chart (1997)	Peak position
Netherlands (Dutch Top 100)	56
US Heatseekers (Billboard)	32
