= Yours Truly (Sick of It All album) =

Studio album by Sick of It All
- Released: November 21, 2000
- Recorded: Show Place Studios (Dover, New Jersey)
- Genre: Hardcore punk
- Length: 38:18
- Label: Fat Wreck Chords
- Producer: Steve Evetts

Sick of It All chronology
Call to Arms (1999)	Yours Truly (2000)	Live in a Dive (2002)

Professional ratings
Review scores
Source	Rating
AllMusic	3/5 stars
Drowned in Sound	8/10
Punknews.org	5/5 stars

Yours Truly is an album by the American hardcore punk band Sick of It All. It was released in 2000 on Fat Wreck Chords.

== Critical reception ==
AllMusic wrote: "Pure grit and growl swirl among speed metal guitar licks and thunderous percussion, Sick of It All twists the new millennium punk revival backward to achieve what once was an intimidating scene for music."

Ox-fanzine stated "On "Yours Truly," the band takes a somewhat more rock-oriented and raucous approach—"America" is a prime example of this. There are also plenty of sing-along moments; "Turn My Back" alone is sure to trigger a deafening crowd response and really rock the house during live shows."

Wall of Sound called it "possibly their best album" adding After the somewhat disappointing ‘Call To Arms’ this is a real welcome return. Powerful songs like ‘Hands Tied Eyes Closed’ & ‘District’ sees their patented hardcore formula shine but other songs like ‘America’ & ‘Souvenir’ actually show a certain tunefulness creeping into Lou Koller’s holler. And the thing is it sounds so good you wonder why he didn’t introduce it years ago."

== Track listing ==
All tracks written by Sick of It All.

1. "Blown Away" – 2:32
2. "Nails" – 1:47
3. "The Bland Within" – 2:10
4. "Hello Pricks" – 2:53
5. "District" – 3:26
6. "Disco Sucks Fuck Everything" – 2:12
7. "America" – 2:15
8. "Hands Tied Eyes Closed" – 2:17
9. "Turn My Back" – 2:07
10. "Broke Dick" – 0:48
11. "Souvenir" – 3:31
12. "Cruelty" – 2:29
13. "This Day and Age" – 1:30
14. "Ruin" – 2:54
15. "Cry for Help" – 1:43
16. "No Apologies" – 3:47

== Credits ==
- Lou Koller – vocals
- Pete Koller – guitar
- Craig "Ahead" Setari – bass guitar
- Armand Majidi – drums
- Recorded at Show Place Studios, Dover, New Jersey
- Produced and engineered by Steve Evetts
