= Scott Vogel =

American vocalist (born 1973)

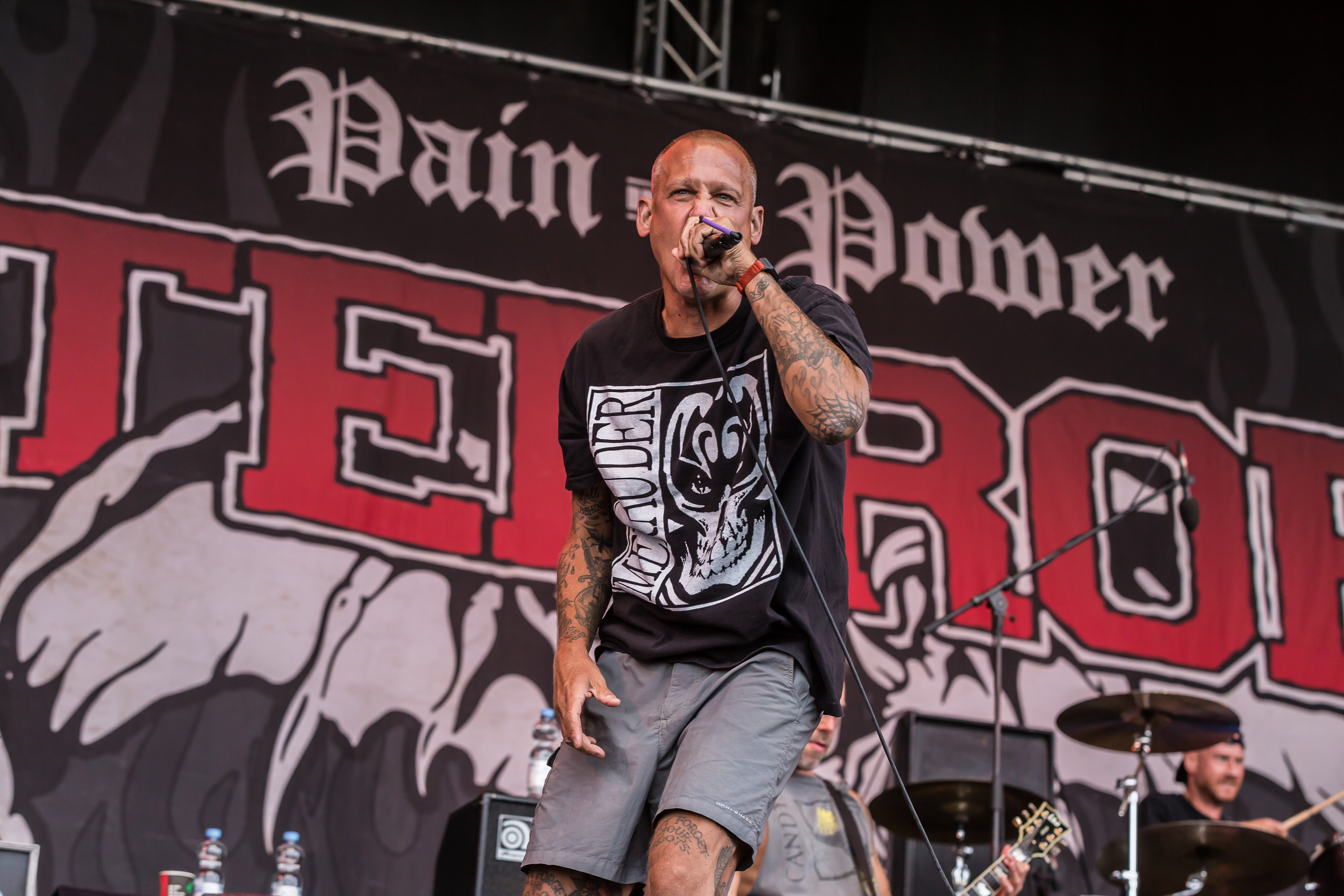
- Vogel with Terror at Full Rewind 2024

Background information
- Born: April 5, 1973 (age 53); Buffalo, New York
- Genres: Hardcore punk, beatdown hardcore
- Occupations: Singer, songwriter
- Member of: Terror, Buried Alive, Bad Blood
- Formerly of: World Be Free, Despair, Slugfest

Scott Vogel is an American vocalist. He is the lead singer and founding member of hardcore punk band Terror and Buffalo hardcore bands Buried Alive and Bad Blood. He has been the vocalist of various other projects including Slugfest, Despair and World Be Free.

In 2024 he was voted the second greatest hardcore singer of all time by readers of Alternative Press Magazine.

== Early life ==
Scott Vogel was born April 5, 1973, in Buffalo, New York. He has two sisters and his parents separated when he was young, he spent his early years with his mother. Vogel has stated that he was first impacted by music when he was in 3rd/4th grade and his mother’s boyfriend gifted him both Black Sabbath’s self-titled and Paranoid albums on vinyl. From here Vogel went on to listen to bands such as AC/DC, Twisted Sister, Ratt and Iron Maiden. During this time his stepbrother Jay also got Vogel interested hardcore music such as Social Distortion and Minor Threat along with hip-hop acts like Run DMC. Vogel’s mother eventually ended up moving to Texas with one of his sisters leading to him moving in with his father. Vogel and his step brother Jay would then begin to regularly attend hardcore shows Vogel later stated in an interview with Kerrang! "when I found hardcore it gave me a place where I felt like I belonged and where I wanted to be."

== Career ==
=== Slugfest and Despair ===
In the early 1990s, Vogel formed his first band Slugfest; with his stepbrother Jay, the two would regularly attend hardcore shows at the River Rock Cafe and would eventually recruit the venues owner’s son Jon to play drums. The band made a name for themselves playing live shows and releasing multiple demos. After releasing Buried Alive in 1993 soon after Vogel’s stepbrother Jay left the band, they played one more show with Sandy from Chokehold on guitar. However bassist Plowe also left, leading to Tim from Against All Hope playing bass for their last couple of shows, Jay was about to rejoin the band however Tim was asked to play drums in Snapcase, which brought the end of the band besides a few reunion show’s. They recorded four more songs around that time with Matt Dente on bass.

Vogel later commented on his time in Slugfest stating:

Everything was first with Slugfest. First out of town shows. First time having my music on vinyl. First time feeling like a few people actually liked my band. It’s was all very exciting and completely innocent. I miss it a lot. Things now are very 'professional' and calculated. Back then, we just followed our hearts 100 percent and the result was 100 percent genuine.

Following the dissolution of Slugfest Vogel became the lead vocalist of new band called Despair. Vogel was their lead vocalist from 1994 to 1998 during this time they released multiple Eps and one full length album Pattern Life in 1996. He also played drums in Against All Hope and Fadeaway.

=== Buried Alive ===
Just like the disbandment of Slugfest Vogel quickly helped form Buried Alive following the end of Despair. The group was soon signed to Victory Records. They first released a 7-inch single titled Six Month Face, and later followed it with their debut full-length, The Death of Your Perfect World. Soon after Vogel decided to disband Buried Alive not long after finishing demo recordings for a second album. Those recordings were eventually gathered and released by Victory in 2001 under the title Last Rites.

The band reformed in 2020 to record Death Will Find You on Bridge 9 Records. The four-track EP is their first recording in two decades.

=== Terror ===
Following the break up of Buried Alive Vogel contemplated quitting his music career after feeling frustrated with how all his previous bands came to an end. He then got offered to become the next lead singer for 100 Demons but turned down the offer and moved to California.

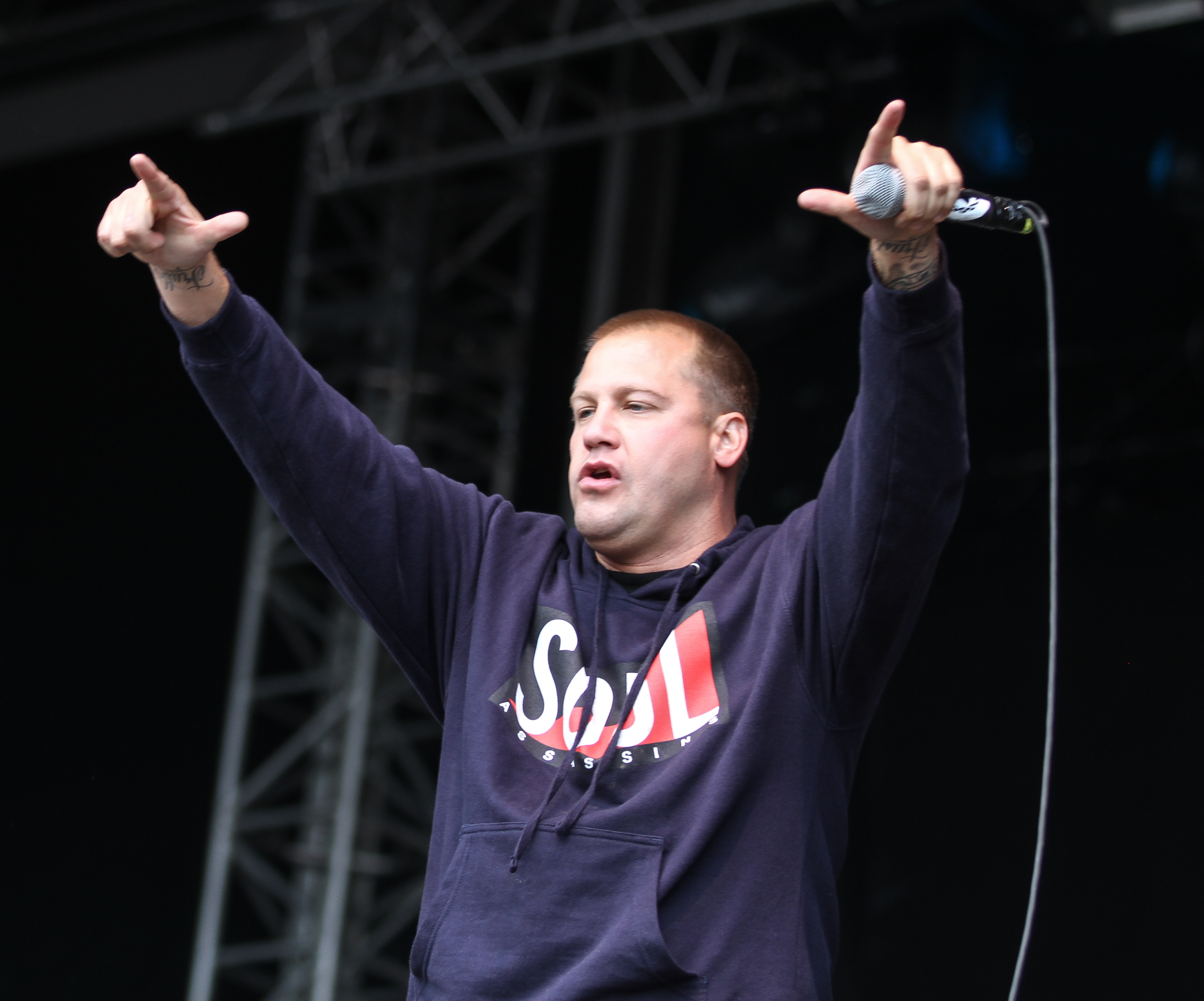
Vogel with Full Force Festival 2013

In the early 2000s Vogel was contacted by members of a hardcore band called Carry On who had recently broken up. They informed Vogel that they were starting a new band and wanted him to be their lead singer. Terror was then formed in February 2002, by vocalist Scott Vogel, guitarist Todd Jones, drummer Nick Jett, and bass guitarist Matt Smith; the group remained a four-piece until September 2002. In 2004 their debut album One with the Underdogs was released. The group have since been noted as one of the most influential modern bands within tough guy hardcore and hardcore punk, with Stereogum describing Terror as "an institution within their genre".

Their 2013 album Live by the Code reached the Billboard 200, and they have since released a total of eight studio albums, along with a number of live albums, EPs, and other recordings. Pain Into Power was released in May 2022.

=== World Be Free ===
World Be Free, currently signed to Revelation Records, is Vogel’s newest project which began in 2014 and features Vogel on vocals, along with guitarist Joe Garlipp (Despair), guitarist Andrew Kline (Strife), drummer Sammy Siegler (Judge/CIV/Rival Schools), and bassist Alex Barreto (Chain of Strength/Excel). The band's debut full length titled The Anti-Circle was released on February 6, 2016. In 2020 a EP One Time For Unity was released in 2020.

=== Guest appearances and collaborations ===
In 2003 Vogel provided guest vocals on the song "Nothing Left" from the Throwndown album Haymaker. In 2006 Vogel collaborated with the hip hop group Jedi Mind Tricks on the song "Heavy Metal Kings". In 2004 Vogel provided backing vocals on the Agnostic Front album Another Voice. In 2010 Vogel appeared in the music video for Vinnie Paz song "Keep Movin' On" where he played an American war veteran. Vogel also served as a ghostwriter for Buffalo Wild Wings which is a side project of Terror bandmate Nick Jett.

In 2011 Vogel and Jett teamed up with Matt Henderson formerly of Agnostic Front and Madball, Sam Trapkin of Trapped Under Ice and Chris Beattie of Hatebreed to release an album I Owe You Nothing under the name S.O.S.

In 2009 Vogel and his step brother Jay started a new project Serpents of Shiva. They recorded one album in 2009 however the project was then shelved. However in 2021 the album was finally released on Velocity Records.

In 2022 Vogel featured on the Kublai Khan song "Swan Song", later in the year he also featured on the Freya single "Thousand Yard Stare". In 2023 he featured on the Eight Count song "Revenge".

In 2023 Vogel worked with members of the Buffalo, New York hardcore band Violent Way to release an Ep The Bad Kind Decides under the name Bad Blood.

== Style and influences ==
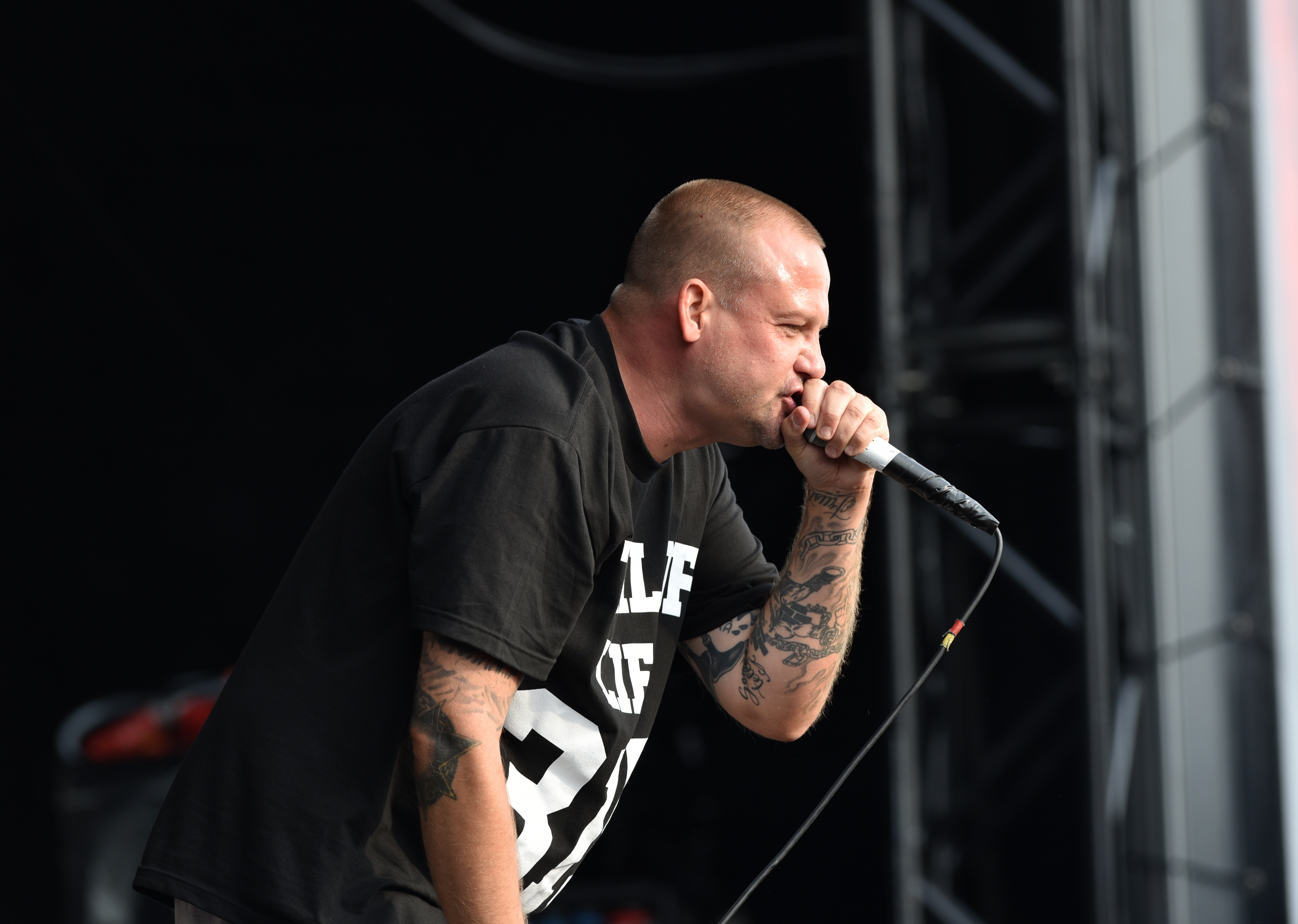
Vogel in 2017

Vogel’s musical taste ranges from hardcore to hip-hop, in 2018 he revealed some of his most impactful hardcore albums which included Agnostic Front — Victim in Pain, Warzone — Don’t Forget the Struggle, Leeway – Born to Expire, Youth of Today — We’re Not in This Alone and Gorilla Biscuits — Start Today.

During Terror’s live shows Vogel is known to be very active on stage and interactive with the crowd. He is also known for his blunt and provocative on stage remarks and comments that are frequently discussed by listeners and often evoke a wide range of emotions. These types of statements by Vogel have even earned their own distinct label, known as "Vogelisms." However in a 2007 interview with Lambgoat Vogel stated that he never actually uttered half of the remarks attributed to him.

In a 2018 interview he commented on the bands live shows stating "When we play, I want people to remember why they fell in love with this music. It's about being part of something real."

In an interview Vogel described his take on hardcore as:

Hardcore is a place where the excluded and outsiders find truth and hope. It is energy and expression. It is sincere and genuine friendship. The point is that, on the other side of the world, you can meet people who feel exactly the way you do.

== Personal life ==
Vogel lived in Buffalo, New York until the early 2000s when he moved to Los Angeles, California. In 2022 Vogel revealed that he had moved back to Buffalo.

=== Stage Injuries ===
During a tour with Terror in June of 2015, Vogel had injured his back, forcing him to leave the tour and return home for evaluation. The band cancelled all immediate touring plans as Vogel recovered. In May of 2016 Vogel was once again sidelined from touring after suffering a spinal injury. Later that same year Vogel faced back problems and was once again forced to miss multiple shows.

== Discography ==
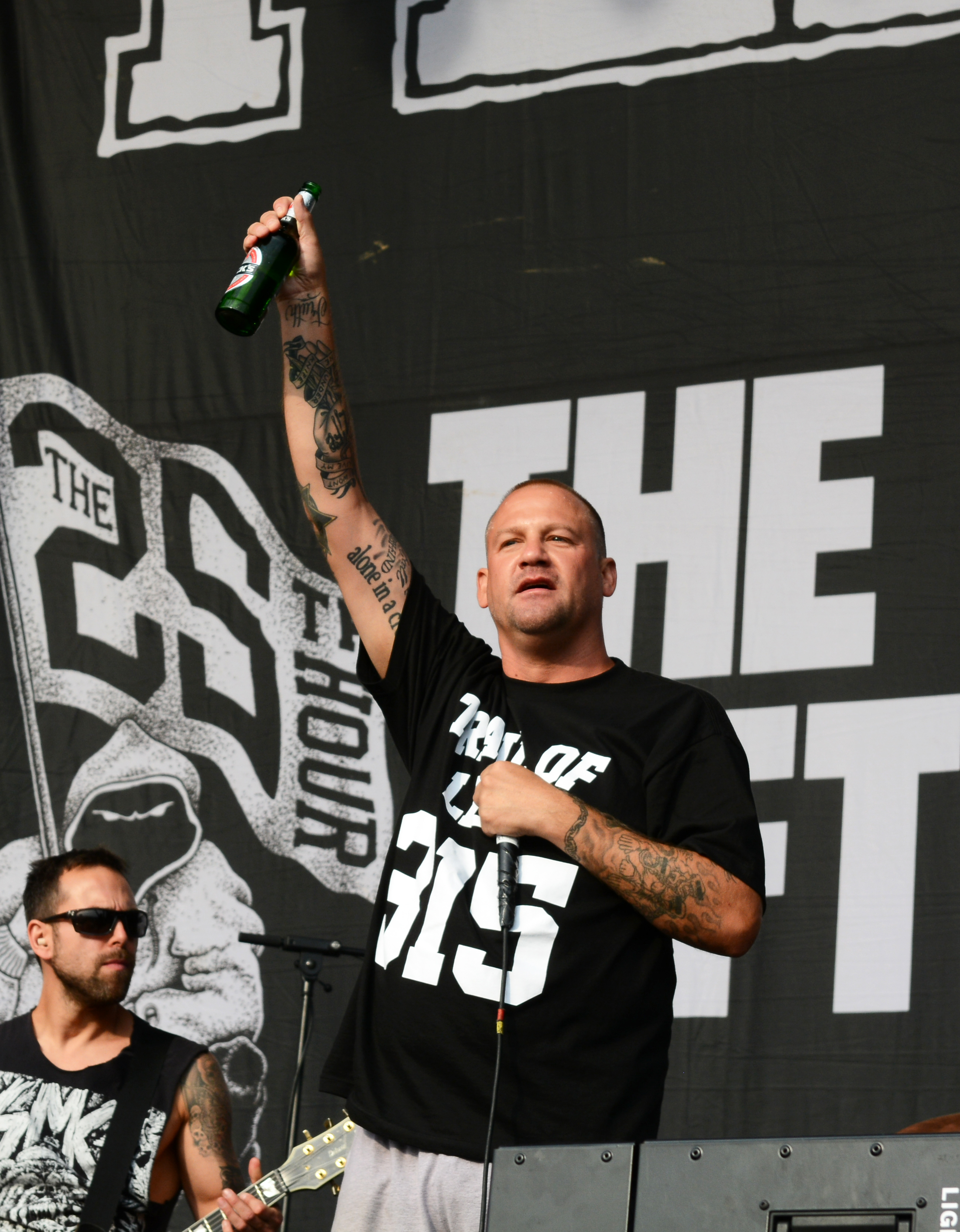
Vogel at Reload Festival 2017

Terror

See also Terror Discography

- One with the Underdogs (2004)
- Always the Hard Way (2006)
- The Damned, the Shamed (2008)
- Keepers of the Faith (2010)
- Live by the Code (2013)
- The 25th Hour (2015)
- Total Retaliation (2018)
- Pain into Power (2022)
- Still Suffer (2026)

Buried Alive

- "Six Month Face" 7" (1999)
- The Death of Your Perfect World (1999)
- Split 7" w/Reach the Sky (2000)
- Last Rites (2001) (Victory Records)
- Watchmen Session – Demo '98 (2018)
- "Death Will Find You" 7" (2020)
- "The Episcopalian" 12" w/ Sloth Finger

Bad Blood

- The Bad Kind Decides EP (2023)

Cinderblock

- Breathe The Fire (2023)

Despair

- Pattern Life (1996)

Fadeaway

- Fadeaway (1994) (Drums)

Serpents of Shiva

- Serpents of Shiva (2009)

Slugfest

- Build Up (1990)
- Music to Dance to (1992)
- Buried Alive (1993)

S.O.S.

- I Owe You Nothing (2011)

World Be Free

- The Anti-Circle (2016)
- One Time For Unity EP (2020)

== Guest appearances ==
- Throwndown — "Nothing Left" (2003)
- Agnostic Front — "Another Voice" (2004)
- Teamkiller — "Over & Out" (2006)
- Jedi Mind Tricks — "Heavy Metal Kings" (2006)
- Against — "Against The Grain" (2007)
- Mr Dibbs — "Stand" (2010)
- Skharhead — "The Hard Way" (2011)
- Born From Pain — "Bleed The Poison" (2014)
- Madball — "True School" (2014)
- New Found Glory — "Resurrection" (2014)
- Billy The Kid — "Wolfpack" (2014)
- Stick to Your Guns — "I Choose Nothing" (2015)
- Clearview — "No Good Game" (2017)
- One Against All — "Nope From Hope" (2017)
- The Warriors — "Within, Without" (2019)
- Devil In Me — "D.L.T." (2021)
- Dare — "Hard To Cope" (2021)
- Kublai Khan — "Swan Song" (2022)
- Freya — "Thousand Yard Stare" (2022)
- Eight Count — "Revenge" (2023)
- Pain of Truth — "In Your Heart" (2023)
