= Pain into Power =

Studio album by Terror
- Released: May 6, 2022
- Genre: Hardcore
- Length: 18:11
- Label: Pure Noise
- Producer: Todd Jones

Terror chronology
Total Retaliation (2018)	Pain into Power (2022)	Still Suffer (2026)

Pain into Power is the eighth studio album by American hardcore band Terror. Produced by Todd Jones, the album features guest appearances by various hardcore and metal vocalists, and was released on May 6, 2022.

== Background and recording ==
The album was produced by the bands founding guitarist Todd Jones. On working with Jones again lead vocalist Scott Vogel stated:

He was extremely hands on and he just has a style of writing and it’s always extremely aggressive and explosive and brutal. If you listen to the first Terror record, Lowest of the Low, it’s really got those elements of Todd in it and he definitely brought that back into the band’s fold. Since our very early stuff, this record is our most brutal.

Jones initially wanted to have Will Putney (who produced the bands previous album Total Retaliation) to mix the album. However Terror and Jones instead decided to hire Matt Hyde, so that the whole recording process would take place in Los Angeles.

As for the song writing Vogel added:

There are full songs written by Terror members that Todd didn’t write anything on. There’s definitely tons of it that Todd has picked up a guitar and wrote stuff on, but all of it has Todd’s fingerprint on it, which is just pushing everything to a level of insanity. When he agreed to produce the record, his thought process was “Terror has a lot of groovy stuff, we have slower stuff, we mix things up. For this one, start to finish, just pure, blazing, in-your-face aggression that doesn’t let up.” We pretty much close to accomplished that.

== Lyrics and song meanings ==
Decibel described the albums lyrical themes, Vogel himself stated that he was inspired to write about all the negative things that were going on around the world.

During a 2022 interview with Consequence Vogel went over the meaning of some of the songs on the album. The title track was inspired by Terror’s 20th anniversary and the fact that the band was still "thriving" after all this time. "Unashamed" is about a friend of Scott Vogel’s who randomly had an issue with him. "Outside the Lies" is a song about self confidence and believing in yourself. "One Thousand Lies" is a tribute to Vogel’s old band Despair. "On the Verge of Violence" is a look into Vogel’s heart and where his head was during the Covid-19 pandemic in 2020 and 2021.

Despite the negative aspects of the lyrics the albums title was described by Vogel as a "positive thing in trying to find a way to take all of this terrible stuff and make you stronger out of it."

== Release and promotion ==
Terror officially announced the album and its release date on March 8, 2022, that same day they also released the first single "Can't Help But Hate," featuring Cannibal Corpse vocalist George "Corpsegrinder" Fisher. The second single "Boundless Contempt" was released on April 6. The third and final single the title track was released on April 26, alongside an official music video. On May 7, the day after the albums release Terror released another music video for the track "Unashamed," which features guest appearances from Crystal Pak of Initiate and Madison Watkins ofYear Of The Knife.

Following the albums release Terror toured the U.S. alongside Kublai Khan and Sanguisugabogg.

On August 22, the band released an official music video for "Can’t Help But Hate" along with a B side from the album a cover of Death Threat's song "Dead At Birth".

== Critical reception ==
Professional ratings
Review scores
Source	Rating
Metal Injection	9/10 stars
Kerrang!	4/5
Distorted Sound Magazine	8/10
Lambgoat	9/10
The New Noise	4/5 stars

like the band’s previous efforts Pain into Power revived positive reviews Metal Injection gave the album a 9/10 stating “Terror are still the undisputed kings of the hardcore scene. It's relentless, bone-snapping stuff that flattens everything around it just as indiscriminately as ever, but never compromises on its messages for the sake of piling on more aggression, that bane of modern hardcore. There's little else to say, except that is a must listen.” Ray of New Noise Magazine added, Terror’s latest album is true to themselves; unapologetically coarse and direct. The band’s techniques have given them a line they tow and improve with each release. Pain into Power is a consistent listen; only twenty minutes in length or so, but 10 times as ferocious. Nik Young of Metal Hammer wrote "Their eighth studio album blends the urgency of Lowest Of The Low with modern maturity, and the trusty riffs, breakdowns and basslines are all distilled into an intense, 20-minute adrenaline shot".

Revolver Magazine dubbed Pain Into Power the third best hardcore album of 2022. The BrooklynVegan also put the record on their list of the 20 best hardcore albums of 2022.

== Track listing ==
All tracks are written by Jordan Posner, Scott Vogel, and Nicholas Jett, except where noted.

Pain into Power track listing
No.	Title	Length
1.	"Pain into Power"	0:53
2.	"Unashamed" (featuring Crystal Pak and Madison Watkins; written by Vogel, Posner, Jett, and Chris Linkovich)	1:59
3.	"Boundless Contempt"	2:02
4.	"Outside the Lies"	0:44
5.	"One Thousand Lies"	2:28
6.	"Can't Let It Go"	1:15
7.	"Can't Help but Hate" (featuring Corpsegrinder)	1:26
8.	"The Hardest Truth" (featuring Todd Jones)	2:38
9.	"On the Verge of Violence"	1:58
10.	"Prepare for the Worst"	2:48
Total length:		18:11

== Personnel ==
=== Terror ===
- Scott Vogel – lead vocals
- Nick Jett – drums
- Martin Stewart – rhythm guitar, backing vocals
- Jordan Posner – lead guitar
- Chris Linkovich – bass, backing vocals

=== Guest musicians ===
- Corpsegrinder — vocals
- Todd Jones — vocals
- Crystal Pak — vocals
- Madison Watkins— vocals

=== Technical staff ===
- Todd Jones — producer
- Matt Hyde — mixing, mastering

== Charts ==
Chart performance for Pain into Power
Chart (2022)	Peak position
German Albums (Offizielle Top 100)	8
US Top Album Sales (Billboard)	73
