= Terror (band) =

American hardcore band

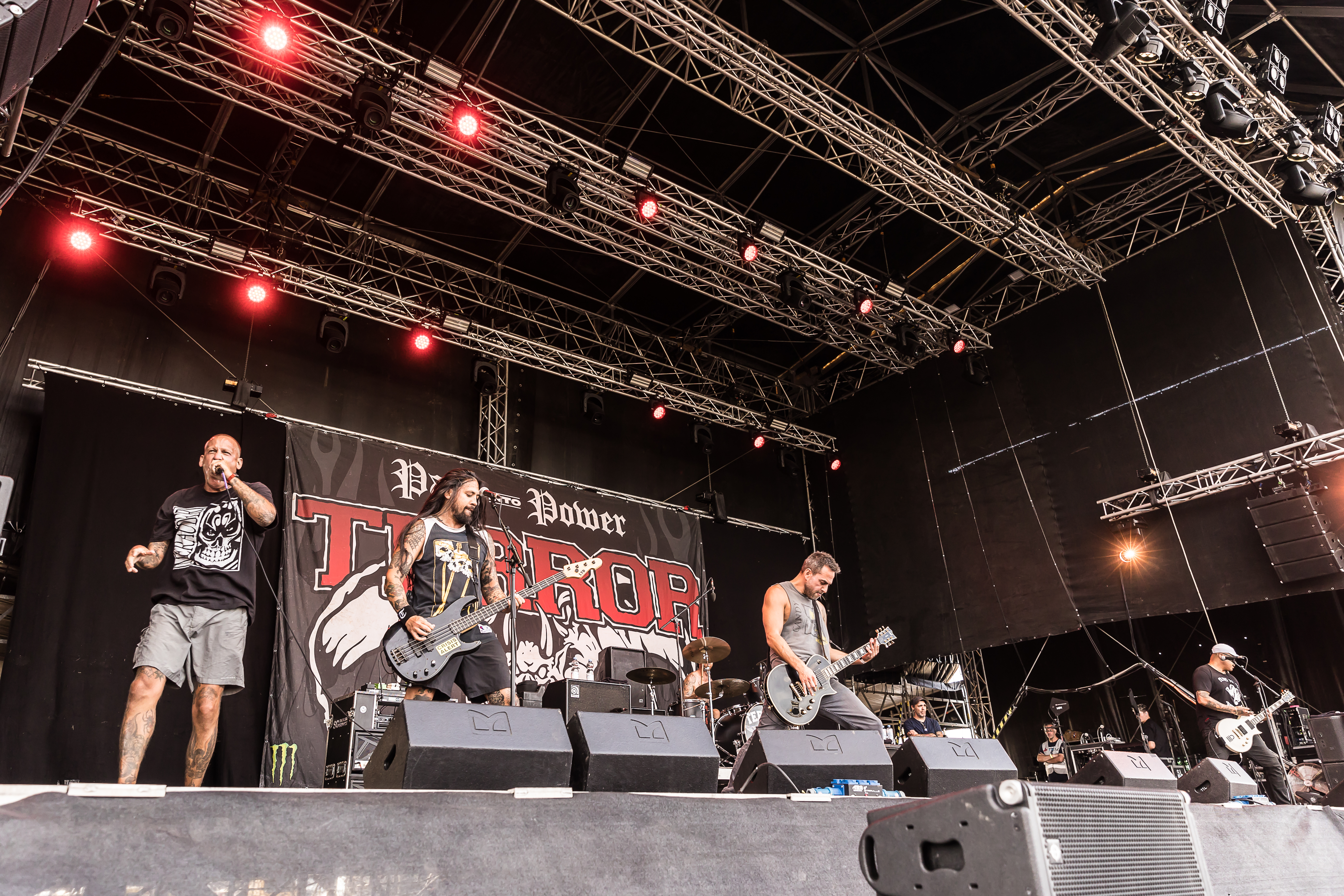
- Terror performing in 2024

Background information
- Origin: Los Angeles, California, U.S.
- Genres: Hardcore punk, beatdown hardcore, tough guy hardcore
- Years active: 2002–present
- Labels: Flatspot, Bridge 9, Trustkill, Century Media, Victory, Pure Noise, Nuclear Blast, Velocity
- Members: Scott Vogel; Nick Jett; Martin Stewart; Jordan Posner; Chris Linkovich
- Past members: See members section

Terror is an American hardcore punk band from Los Angeles, formed in 2002. The band has undergone several line-up changes, all overseen by founding members Scott Vogel (lead vocals) and Nick Jett (drums). Its current lineup also features guitarists Martin Stewart and Jordan Posner, as well as bassist Chris Linkovich. The band has released nine studio albums – the most recent of which, Still Suffer, was released in April 2026. The band are noted as one of the most influential modern bands within tough guy hardcore and hardcore punk, with Stereogum describing Terror as "an institution within their genre". They have toured throughout Europe, Australia, New Zealand, Japan, Korea, Mexico, and South America.

== History ==
=== Formation and One with the Underdogs (2001-2005) ===
In 2001, Scott Vogel previously of Buried Alive was offered to be the lead vocalist of 100 Demons, however he turned down the offer and moved from Buffalo, New York to Los Angeles, California. While in Los Angeles he was contacted by members of the hardcore band Carry On who had recently broken up. They informed Vogel that they were starting a new band and wanted him to be their lead singer.

Terror was then formed in February 2002, by vocalist Scott Vogel, guitarist Todd Jones, drummer Nick Jett, and bass guitarist Matt Smith; the group remained a four-piece until September 2002. The band only came up with its name in April 2002, after its first shows were booked, opening for Death Threat, American Nightmare, and Striking Distance on four of the bands' West Coast tour dates, spanning May 15–19, 2002. Before playing those shows, Terror played a warm-up show, opening for Diehard Youth at Pat's Warehouse in Ventura, California on April 26, 2002. That same year the band released their first material that being two demos. In September of that year bass player Richard Thurston joined the band. Terror then toured alongside Eighteen Visions in the Fall of that year. The following year in 2003 they released an EP Lowest of the Low, along with their first live album titled Live & Death, Thruston then left the band in February of that year and was replaced by Carl Schwartz. In April and May of 2003 Terror toured Europe with Biohazard and Caliban. During the Summer they supported Most Precious Blood on a U.S. tour, they then toured with Every Time I Die into Fall of that year.

In 2004 their debut album One with the Underdogs was released and has sold over 40,000 copies. From May to June they supported Stretch Arm Strong on a U.S. tour, In July and August of that year they toured alongside Sick of It All and Time In Malta. Following the tour, Terror had to cancel multiple shows due Vogel suffering neck and back disc issues. They returned to touring in November and December on a co-headlining US tour with Hatebreed. In 2005, they took part in that years Sounds of the Underground tour alongside bands such as Lamb of God, Unearth and Madball. From May into June, they headlined a North American tour with Comeback Kid serving as support, they also supported Converge on their Fall Canadian tour. In October, Terror began fishing the writing process for their second studio album. At the end of the year, bassist Carl Schwartz left Terror to focus on his band First Blood.

=== Always the Hard Way and The Damned, the Shamed (2006-2009) ===
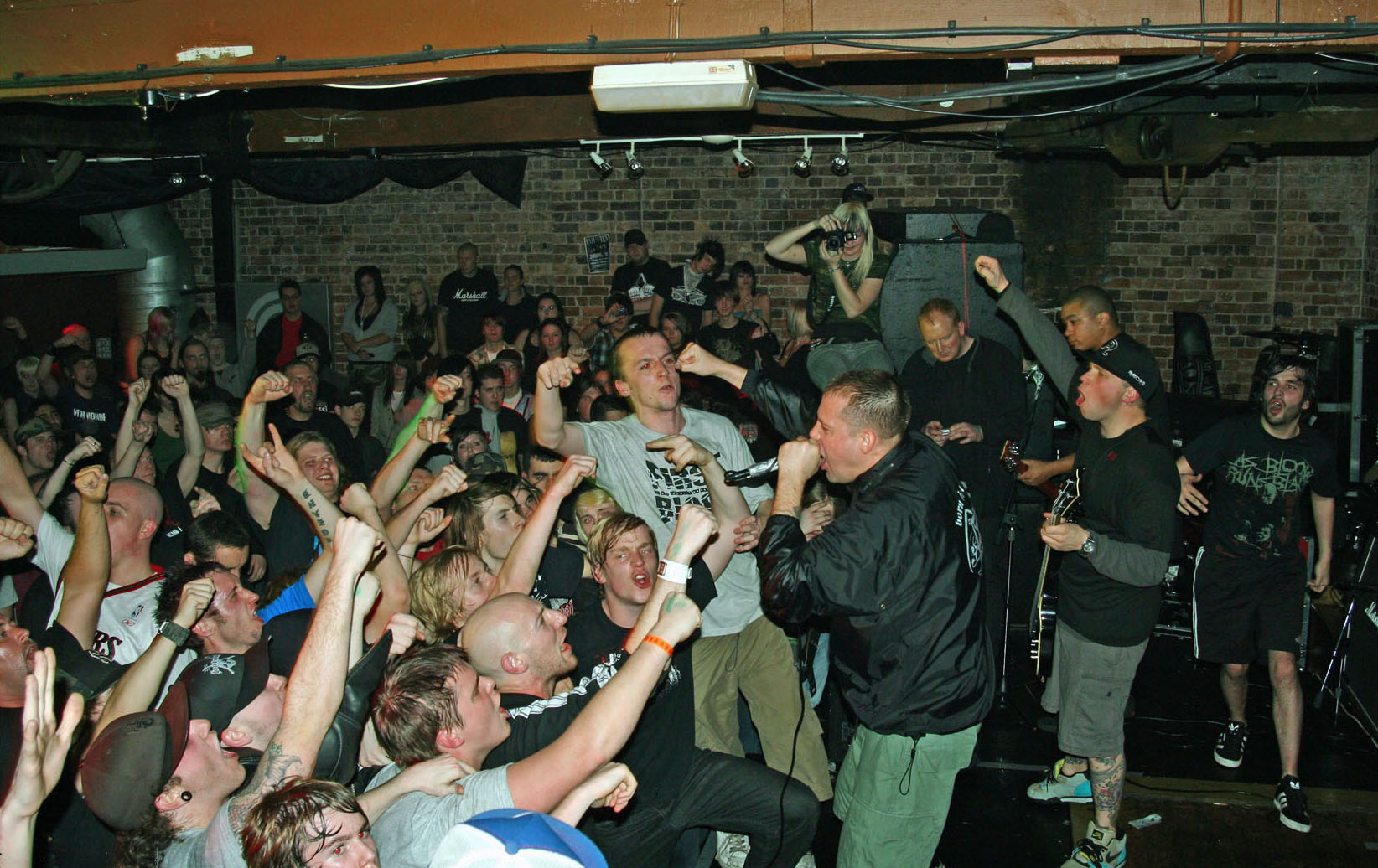
Terror performing in the UK in 2006

To begin 2006 Terror went on a European tour alongside Donnybrook from January to February. In March of that year they announced they had finished recording their next album and also announced Jonathan Buske as their new bass player. In July of that year their sophomore album, Always the Hard Way was released. It reached No. 10 on Billboard Heatseekers and No. 19 on the Top Independent Records chart. Ben of Punknews game the album a positive review stating " What makes Terror stand out from the pack -- besides the clear conviction and honesty in what they do -- is that if you don't take the few negative aspects of them too seriously, you can have a lot of fun with Always the Hard Way." They began touring in support of the album alongside Death Before Dishonor in June and of July.

Terror once again took part in the Sounds of the Underground tour this time as one of the featured acts alongside As I Lay Dying, In Flames and Trivium. They also made their first appearance on the Persistence tour with other hardcore acts like Sick of it All. Before Terror, vocalist Scott Vogel sang for Slugfest, Despair, and for Buffalo, New York-based metalcore act Buried Alive in the mid-1990s. Drummer Nick Jett and ex-lead guitarist Todd Jones were members of the well-known hardcore band Carry On (who had releases on Bridge Nine and Teamwork Records). Richmond, Virginia's David Wood is well known as the vocalist of his hometown hardcore band Down to Nothing. Carl Schwartz, formerly of Sworn Vengeance, recorded much of Always the Hard Way after quitting the band to front First Blood full-time. 2006 also seen them release their second live album The Living Proof.

In early 2007, Terror went on a headlining tour, with The Warriors and All Shall Perish serving as support. From April to March of that year they toured Europe extensively with Full Blown Chaos. In November and December of 2007 they toured the U.S. alongside Chimaira. In of 2008 Terror released their third live album titled CBGB OMFUG Masters: Live June 10, 2004, The Bowery Collection. In February the band announced they had finished recording their third studio album. The Damned, the Shamed was then released May 26, Alex Henderson of AllMusic wrote "The Damned, The Shamed is a solid example of a CD that isn't big on originality but definitely comes through in terms of quality." They began touring in support of the album with in April with Ignite in Europe and also once again took part in that years Persistence tour. In September bass player Johnathan Burke left the group, he was later replaced by David Wood in 2009. In January 2009, guitarist Doug Weber left the band and was temporarily replaced by Jordan Posner who would stay on as an official member. In Spring of that year Terror toured alongside Emmure and Winds Of Plague. During the Fall they played multiple shows in Asia and Australia. In December they began the writing process for their fourth studio album.

=== Keepers of the Faith, Live by the Code and The 25th Hour (2010-2015) ===
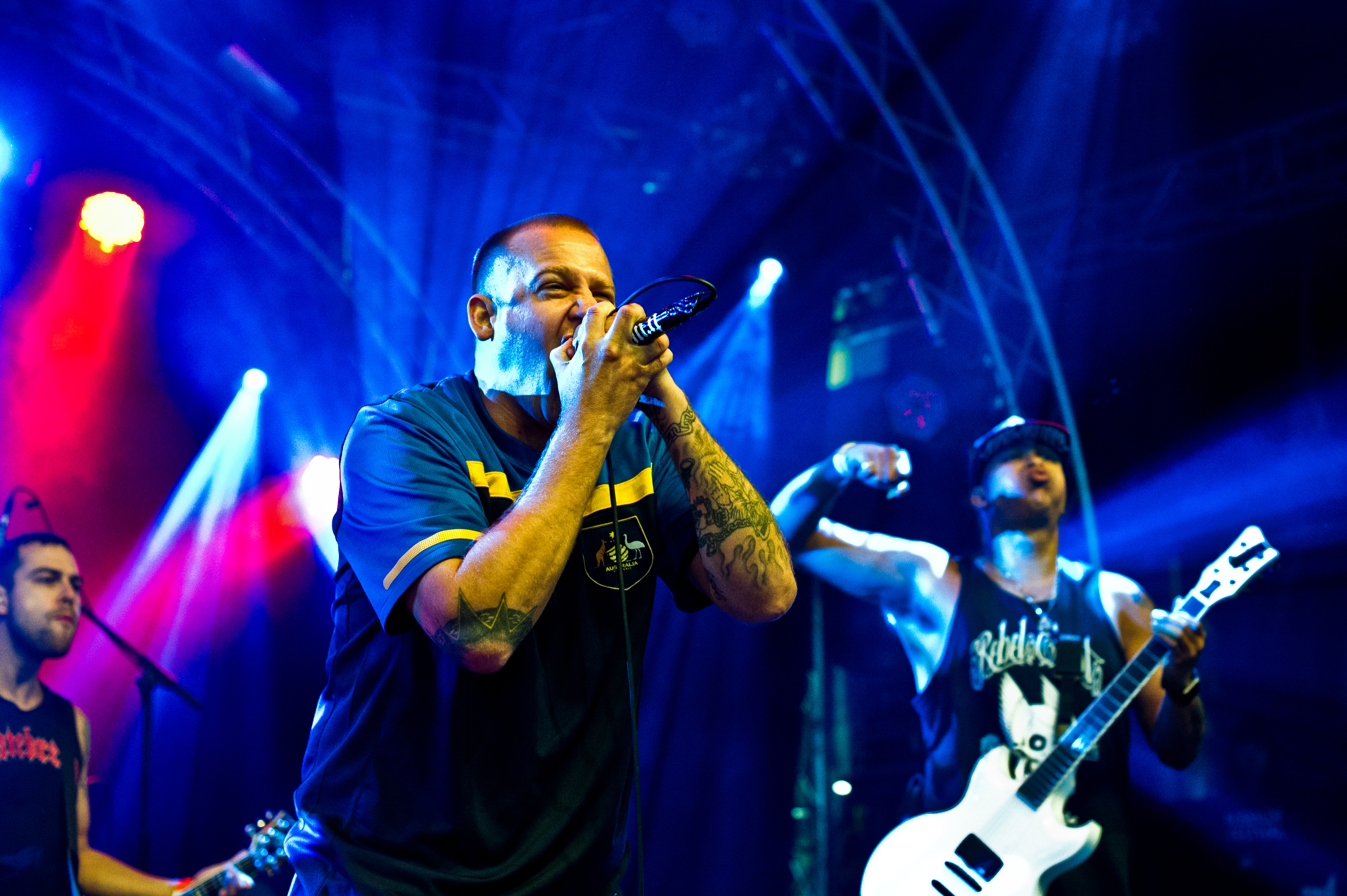
Terror performing at Roskilde Festival in 2011

The group then signed with Century Media to release their 4th album Keepers of the Faith in 2010 and sold around 2,500 copies in its first week. The album was met with positive reception, Gregg Harrington of Scenepoint blank wrote "Terror has again reclaimed the crown of modern hardcore with Keepers Of The Faith. The quality of the production offered by Chad Gilbert of New Found Glory gives the record the dynamics it needs to be heavy in all the right places." The group then headlined the 2010 Hell on Earth tour, with support of Every Time I Die and All Shall Perish. They also headlined alongside Madball and Death Before Dishonor in the Rebellion tour. 2010 also seen them release their fourth live album No Regrets, No Shame: The Bridge Nine Days, which was filmed during a show at the Showcase Theater in Corona, California in 2003.

Terror started 2011 with a European headlining tour with First Blood and Lionheart serving as support. In the Spring of 2011 Terror held a North American headlining tour with Trapped Under Ice and Close Your Eyes as support. They then began working on new material in December of 2011. The touring continued into 2012 including a Summer North American with Bane, Naysayer, and Rotting Out, along with UK and Ireland dates in the Fall, they also once again joined that years Persistence Tour. However group canceled their show in Czech Republic in support of Lamb of God vocalist Randy Blythe during his on going manslaughter case.

February of 2013 seen Terror headline a U.S. tour alongside H2O and Backtrack. Their 5th studio album Live by the Code, originally due out in 2012, was pushed back to April 2013, released by Victory Records on CD and by Reaper Records on vinyl. It was the band's first time charting on the Billboard 200, peaking at No. 121, selling 3,177 copies in its first week. It was also No. 1 on the Heatseekers chart and No. 28 on Independent Albums. It also made the mainstream charts in both Germany and Belgium. A total of six music videos for tracks off of Live by the Code have been released: "Live by the Code", "The Most High", "I'm Only Stronger", "Hard Lessons", "Shot of Reality", and "Cold Truth". The album was met with mostly positive reception, widely considered a standout hardcore album by Terror, praised for its aggressive, uncompromising sound and catchy, singalong anthems AllMusic wrote "With Live by the Code, the L.A. hardcore act crushes 11 songs in under 30 minutes. Their furious lyrics and chunky guitar lines are standard moshing and stage-diving material, but fans will be satisfied nonetheless. Yet another in a long list of quality outings.

They then toured in support of the album while also taking part in the 2013 All Star tour alongside other acts such as Every Time I Die, and Chelsea Grin, also joining that years Rebellion tour. In 2014 they co headlined the Persistence tour alongside Suicidal Tendencies, and also took part in that years Warped tour. During Spring they toured alongside Stick To Your Guns and Hundredth. They also released their fourth live album Live in Seattle in March of that year. They also re released three of their previous albums on their own label Defiant Music Lowest of the Low, One With The Underdogs, and Always the Hard Way.

On January 3, 2015, Terror were in the studio recording their sixth full-length album, The 25th Hour, set to be released on Victory Records. Pre-orders for The 25th Hour were announced on June 30, 2015, along with the albums August 7 release date and a stream for the single "The Solution" which premiered exclusively on Noisey. The album debuted at number 8 on the US Top Hard Rock charts and 17 on the Independent Albums Charts, and received positive reviews, Ray Van Horn of Blabbermouth.net gave the album an 8.5/10 stating "The 25th Hour" makes no bones by venomously turning away outsiders, but it rewards hardcore's true with a half hour of pit-pumping empowerment." Prior to the albums release Vogel had to leave a June tour after suffering a disc injury in his back, this resulted in the band canceling their immediate tour plans. They then returned to touring in Fall of that year with a North American headlining Code Orange, Take Offense and Malfunction served as support.

=== Total Retaliation and Pain into Power (2016-2024) ===
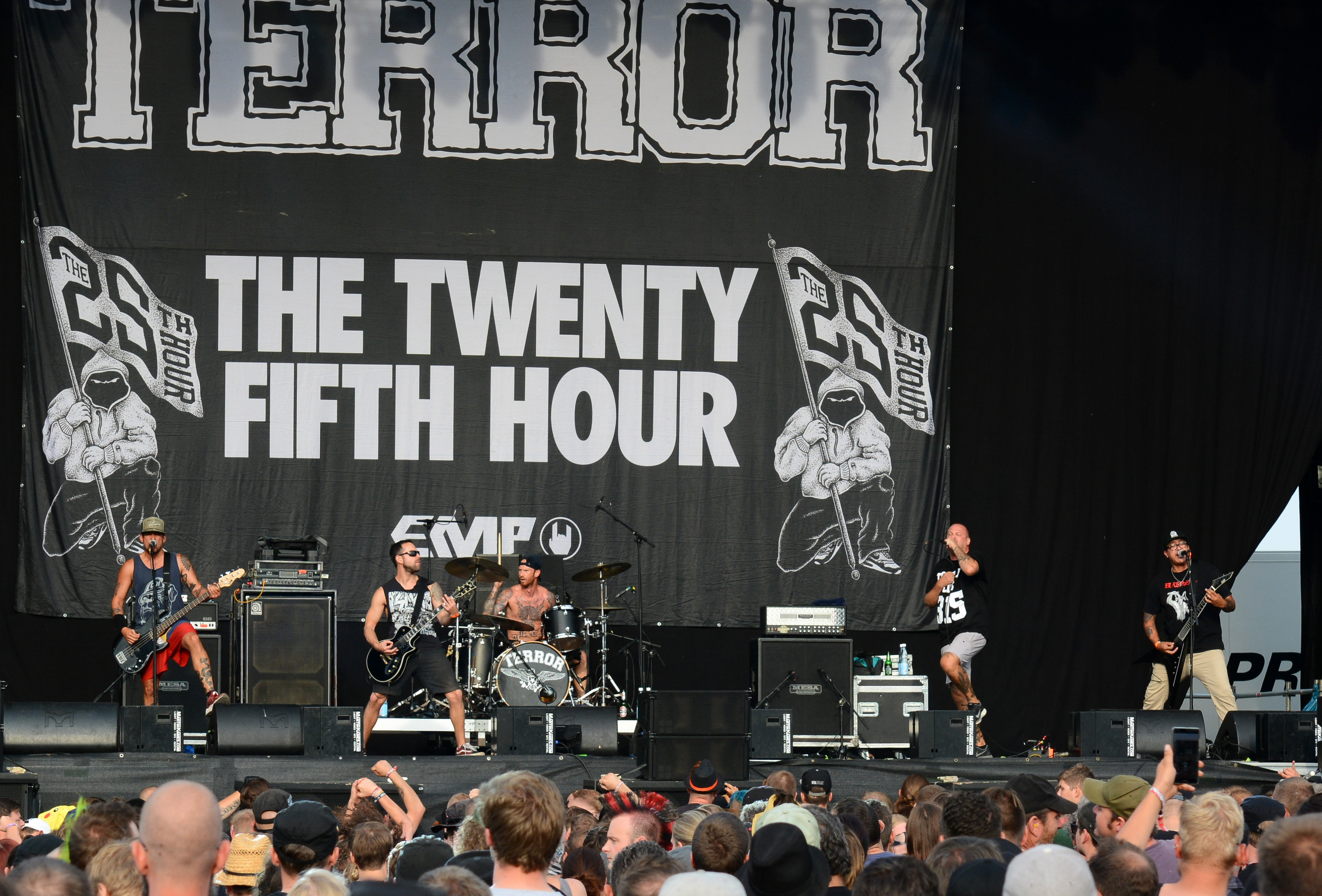
Terror at Reload Festival 2017

In 2016, the group headlined The Life & Death Tour with Power Trip and Harms Way serving as the main supporting acts. However during the tour Vogel once aging suffered another injury resulting in the band dropping off the tour and canceling all upcoming tours dates as Vogel got surgery. In 2017 they released a Ep titled The Walls Will Fall, which Blabbermouth.net called "a notable return to form". In April of that year Cruel Hand‘s Chris Linkovich began filling in for bassist David Wood on tours. Wood then officially left the band in June of that year and Linkovich officially joined the band.

In early 2018 the band embarked on a co headlining tour with Knocked Loose. They then began recording a new album in May, then on August 9, 2018 Terror released a single "Total Demolition" and announced a new album.Total Retaliation, was then released on September 28, 2018, via Pure Noise Records. The album debuted at number 25 on the Top Hard Rock Albums and 12 on the Independent Billboard. Exclaim! wrote "while Total Retaliation is most rewarding in small doses, Terror continue to demonstrate why they have always been at the forefront of the hardcore tribe." Blabbermouth.net added "Total Retaliation" finds TERROR once again at the top of its game and at the top of the pack." Terror then embarked on a North American headlining tour with Harm's Way, Backtrack and Year Of The Knife serving as support.

In 2019, Terror played multiple shows including the Pure Noise Records Tour in North America with Stick To Your Guns, Counterparts, and others, an Australian tour with Stick To Your Guns, and a European tour with Cro-Mags JM, Lions Law, and Jesus Piece. On December 2, 2020 Terror surprise released a four song Ep titled Sink to the Hell which consisted of the bands lost and unreleased material from their recording archives. During a 2021 show in California Terror had UFC fighter Khalil Rountree come up on stage to sing their song 'Out of My Face,' Rountree has stated Terror as one of his favorite bands and thanked Vogel for the lyrics he writes and the messages he has stood by all these years. Stating "That shit got us all through a lot and still does. Terror is a Hall of Fame hardcore band."

In March 2021, they released a compilation album titled Trapped in a World, which saw the band re-record several songs from across their career live in-studio as part of what were billed the "Trapped in a World Sessions". These sessions saw the band reunite with founding lead guitarist Todd Jones, who oversaw production and contributed guitar parts. Jones retained this role for the band's eighth album Pain Into Power, which was released on May 6, 2022. Metal Injection gave the album a 9/10 stating "Terror are still the undisputed kings of the hardcore scene. It's relentless, bone-snapping stuff that flattens everything around it just as indiscriminately as ever, but never compromises on its messages for the sake of piling on more aggression, that bane of modern hardcore. There's little else to say, except that is a must listen." Terror then embarked on a U.S. headlining tour with Kublai Khan, Sanguisugabogg and Pain Of Truth all serving as support. During the Summer of 2022 they played toured Europe, and went on a mini Fall tour with Knocked Loose and Dying Fetus.

In 2023 Terror mainly played US shows and few European shows then also took part in Hatebreed 20th anniversary tour for their album The Rise of Brutality. Terror then went on a world tour in 2024, making stops in the US, a winter Australia tour with Kublai Khan, a Spring and Summer Europe tour along with a mini Japan tour.

=== Still Suffer (2025-present) ===
In 2025, the band announced that their new album, Still Suffer, will be released sometime in 2026 through Flatspot Records. In October of that year, Terror went on a North American tour with Spaced and Combust. They then toured Europe with Gorilla Biscuits and Death Before Dishonor to end the year. In February and March of 2026 Terror embarked on a East Coast tour with Mongrel. The band’s album Still Suffer, was released on April 24, they released the album’s title track on February 26. A day prior to the albums release Terror released a 20 minute documentary titled A Deeper Struggle which was directed by Derek Rathbun and was recorded during the bands Latin America tour the prior year. The band also announced a North American headlining tour in support of the album alongside Pain of Truth from April to early June. They also be took part in the second leg of the Summer Slaughter tour alongside Hatebreed, and will co-headline a European tour with Bane in the Winter.

== Artistry ==
Terror is a hardcore band with influences from metal. Their songs have been described as loud, fast, intense, with powerful vocals and a driving rhythm, with the guitars usually being heavy and the riffs often unembellished, "designed to hit hard".

Terror's lyrics frequently touch on issues of societal decay, pain, struggle, resilience, injustice, greed, and sometimes personal reflections. In a 2022 interview with Decibel, vocalist Scott Vogel stated:

"Terror's always had these lyrical themes of pro- or positive things looking at the hardcore and also, at the same time, looking at the world and knowing it can be an ugly, unforgiving, painful place. To try to spin that and to not let that defeat you."

When asked what makes a good Terror song Vogel commented:

"I'm always a fan of fast shit into something groovy for the chorus, and then a hard-hitting breakdown. For me, it's just an energy. The songs, the riffs, the tempo, the lyrics. It all has to have an energy. I can't say that there's one formula to it".

The band's influences range from metal to fellow hardcore bands, some of these include Testament, Madball, Agnostic Front, Hatebreed, Minor Threat and Bad Brains.

Terror is also known for their live performances, being described as some of the most explosive in hardcore. Since the band's inception in 2002, they have played well over 3,000 concerts worldwide. They are known to bring the classic early-hardcore vibe — no barrier, intensity, constant stage dives, gang vocals, and pure physical energy, with Vogel commanding the crowd. Vogel has stated: "When we play, I want people to remember why they fell in love with this music. It's about being part of something real."

== Members ==
Terror with Full Rewind 2024

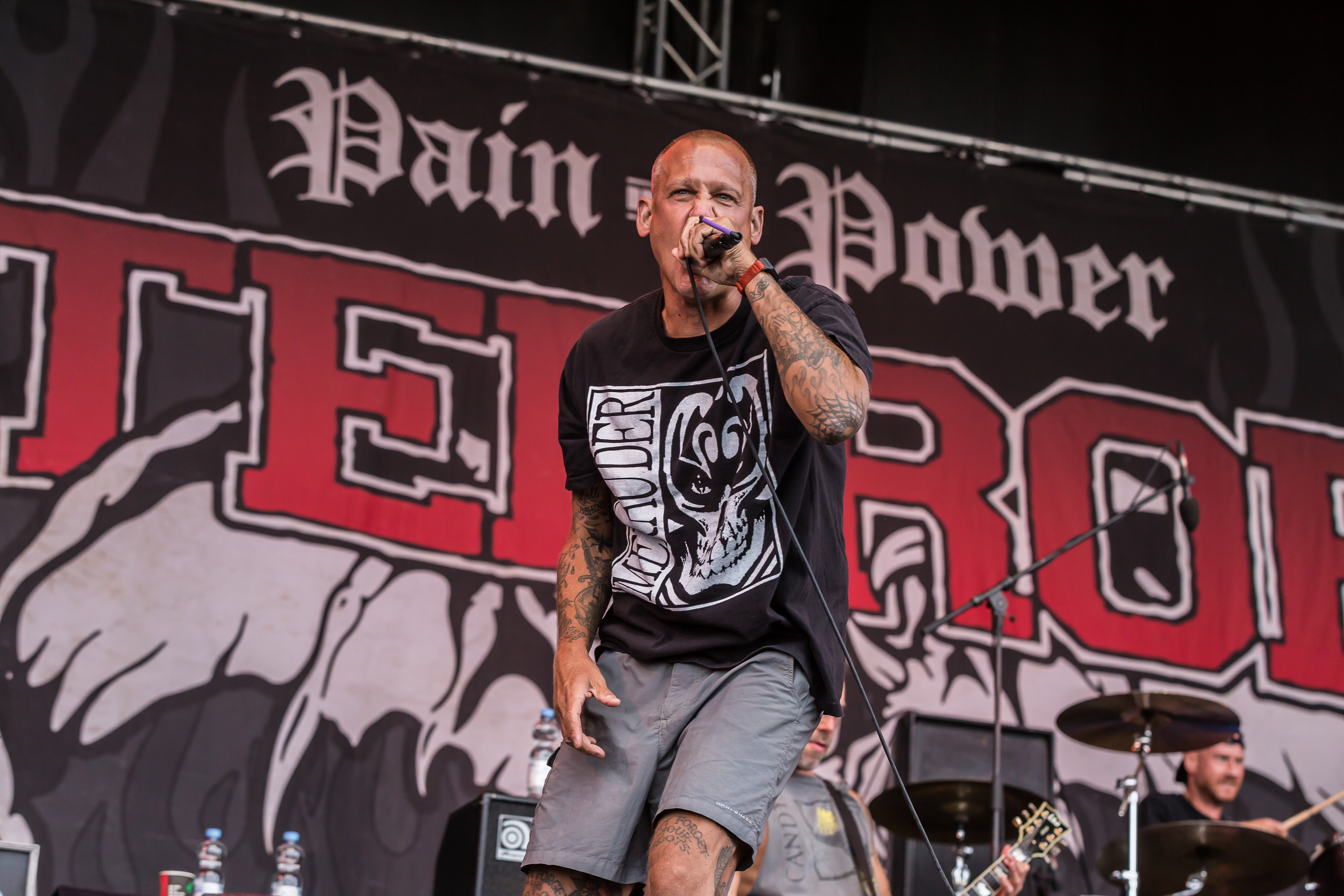
Scott Vogel

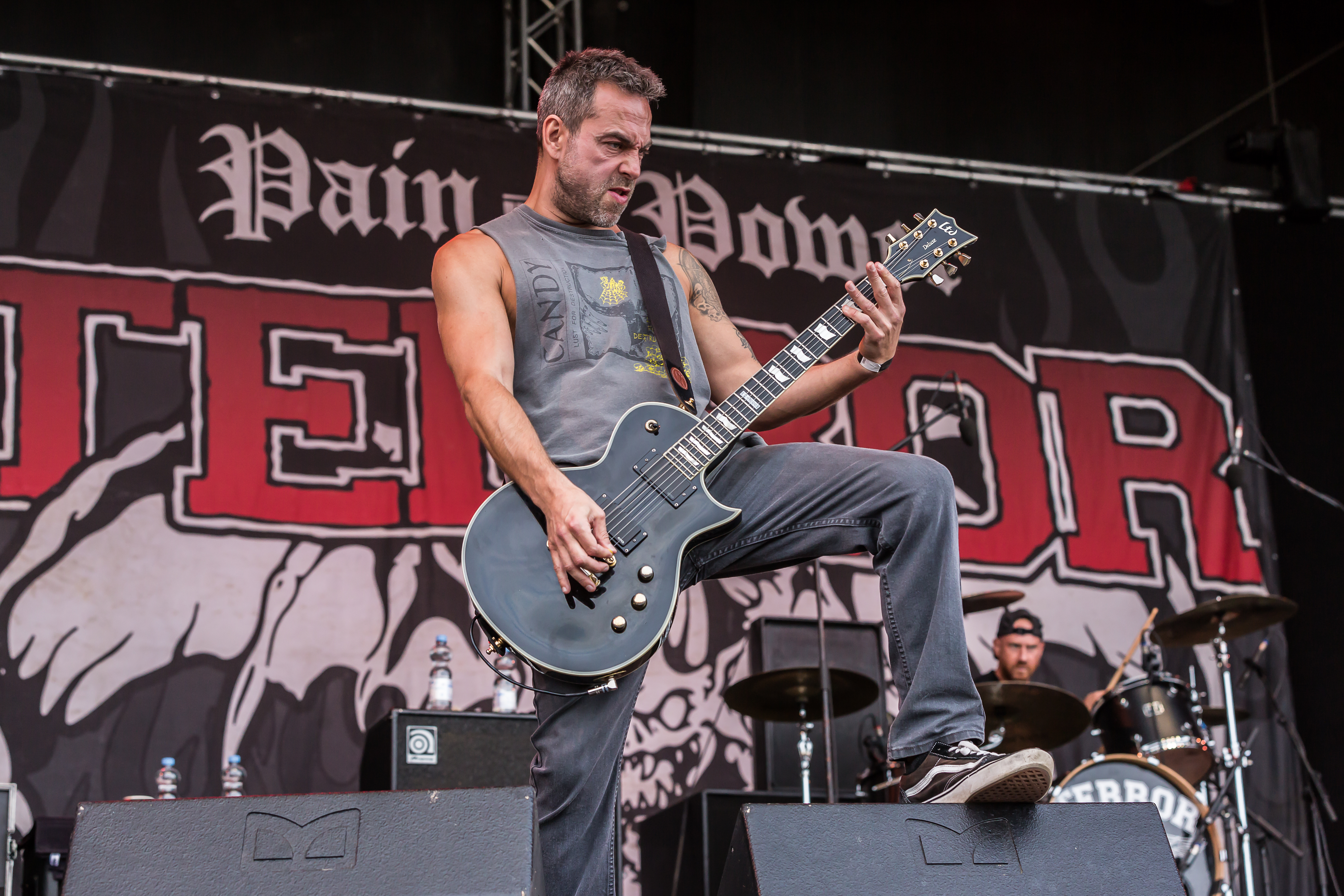
Jordan Posner

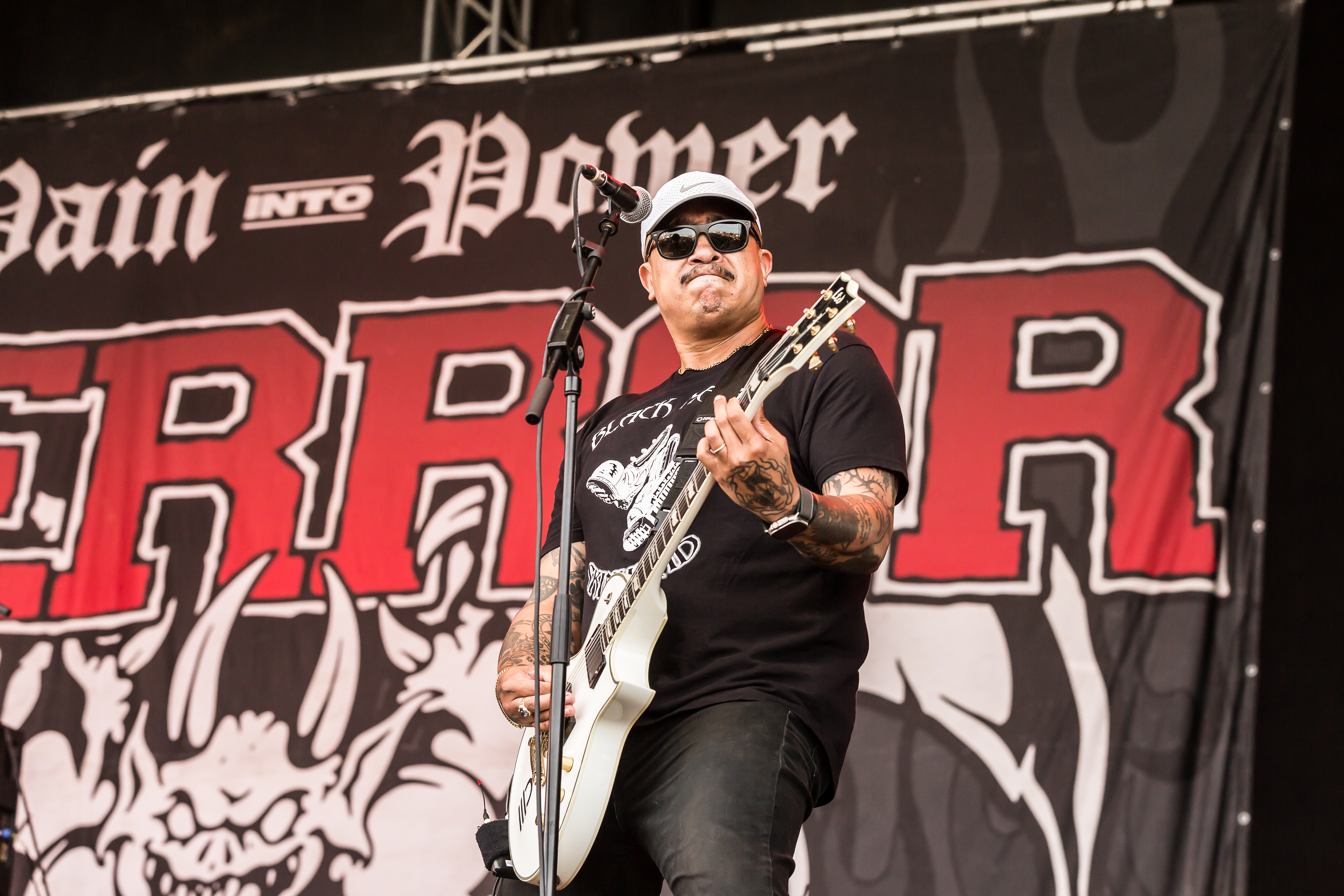
Martin Stewart

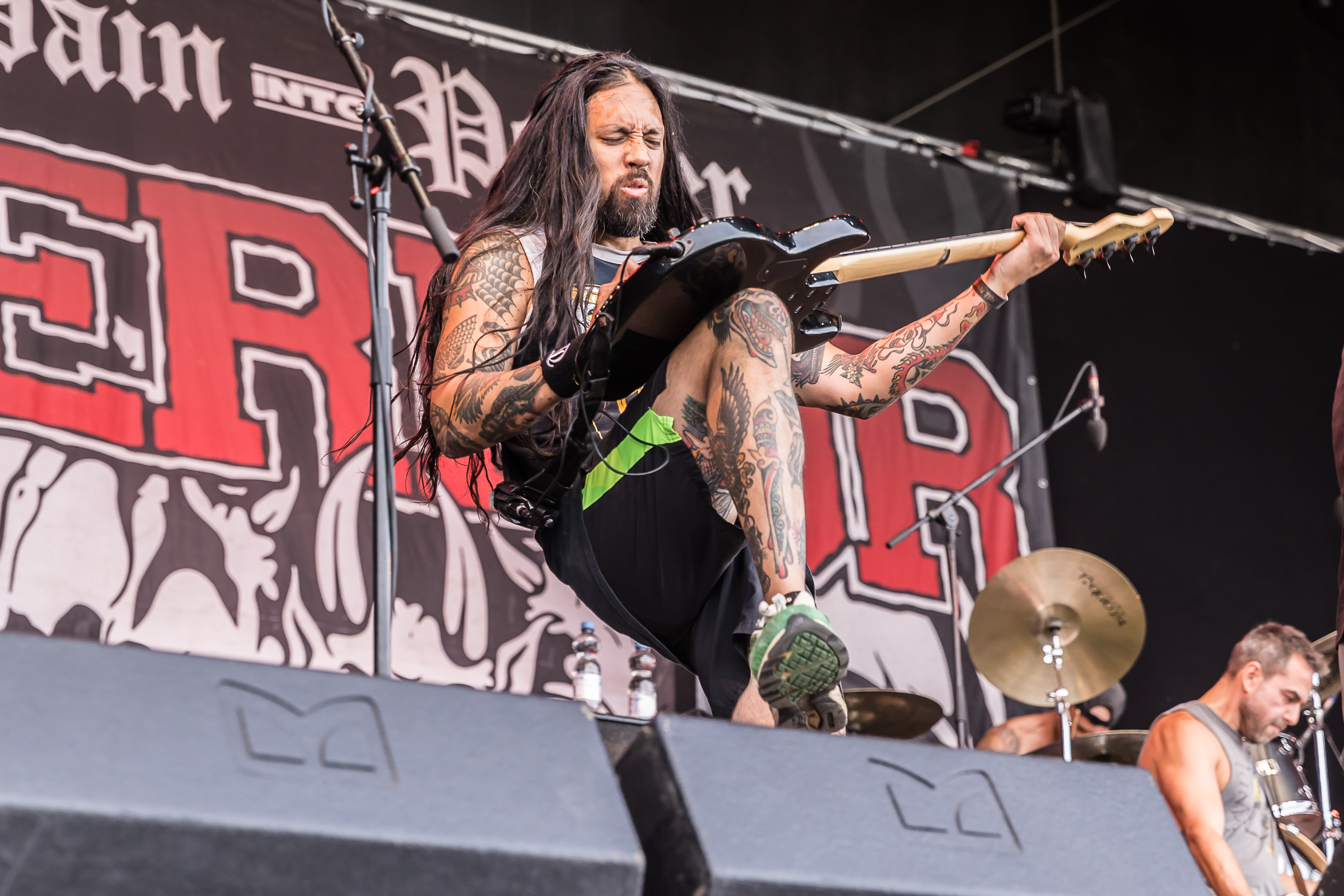
Chris Linkovich

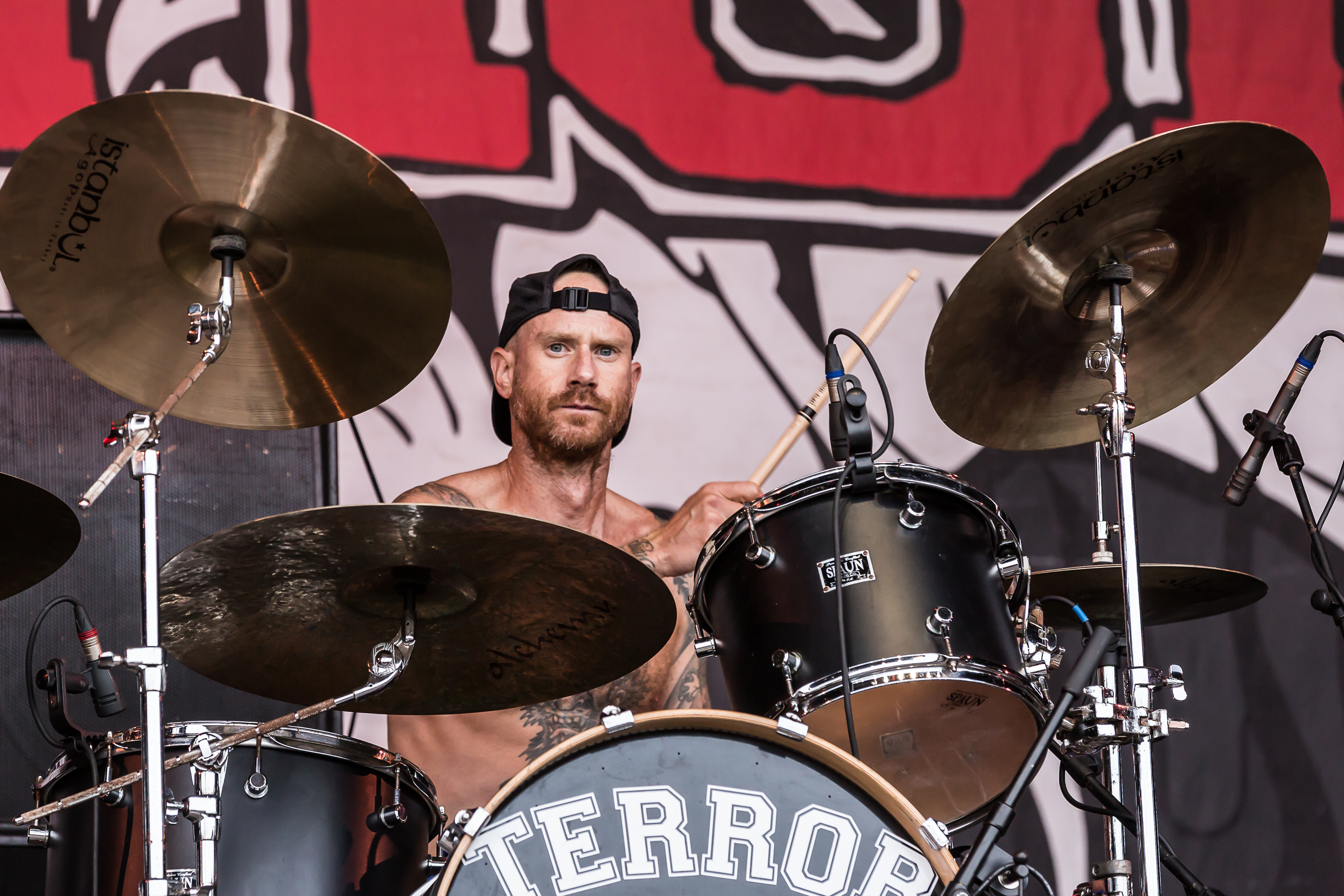
Nick Jett

Current

- Scott Vogel – lead vocals (2002–present)
- Nick Jett – drums (2002–present)
- Martin Stewart – rhythm guitar, backing vocals (2006–present)
- Jordan Posner – lead guitar (2009–present)
- Chris Linkovich – bass, backing vocals (2017–present)

Former

- Matt Smith – bass (2002)
- Eric Pressman – rhythm guitar (2002)
- Todd Jones – rhythm guitar (2002–2004)
- Doug Weber – lead guitar (2002–2009)
- Richard Thurston – bass (2002–2003)
- Carl Schwartz – bass (2003–2005)
- Frank Novinec – rhythm guitar (2004–2006)
- Jonathan Buske – bass (2005–2008)
- David Wood – bass (2009–2017)

Timeline

== Discography ==
=== Studio albums ===
| Year | Album details | Peak chart positions | | | | | | | |
| Year | Album details | US | US Rock | US Hard Rock | US Indie | GER | BEL | AUT | SWI |
|---|---|---|---|---|---|---|---|---|---|
| 2004 | One with the Underdogs: Released: July 27, 2004; Label: Trustkill | — | — | — | 28 | — | — | — | — |
| 2006 | Always the Hard Way: July 25, 2006; Label: Trustkill | — | — | — | 19 | — | — | — | — |
| 2008 | The Damned, the Shamed: Released: May 26, 2008; Label; Century Media | — | — | — | — | — | — | — | — |
| 2010 | Keepers of the Faith: Released: November 10, 2010; Label: Century Media | — | — | — | — | — | — | — | — |
| 2013 | Live by the Code: Released: April 5, 2013; Label: Victory | 145 | 42 | 11 | 28 | 80 | 173 | - | — |
| 2015 | The 25th Hour: Released: August 7, 2015; Label: Victory | - | 33 | 8 | 17 | 46 | 83 | - | — |
| 2018 | Total Retaliation: Released: September 28, 2018; Label: Pure Noise | - | - | 25 | 12 | 48 | 113 | 71 | — |
| 2022 | Pain into Power: Released: May 6, 2022; Label: Pure Noise | — | — | — | — | 8 | — | — | — |
| 2026 | Still Suffer: Released: April 24, 2026; Label: Flatspot | — | — | — | — | 31 | 133 | — | 88 |
"—" denotes a release that did not chart.

=== Live albums ===
| Year | Album | Label |
|---|---|---|
| 2003 | Life & Death | Bridge 9 |
| 2006 | The Living Proof | Trustkill |
| 2008 | CBGB OMFUG Masters: Live June 10, 2004, The Bowery Collection | STREE KING |
| 2010 | No Regrets, No Shame | Bridge 9 |
| 2014 | Live in Seattle | Reaper |

=== Compilation albums ===
| Year | Album | Label |
|---|---|---|
| 2008 | Forever Crossing the Line | Trustkill |
| 2021 | Trapped in a World | Good Fight |

=== Demos ===
| Year | Album | Label |
|---|---|---|
| 2002 | 4 Song Demo | D.I.Y. |
| 2002 | Don't Need Your Help | Take Over / Old Guard |

=== Extended plays ===
| Year | Album | Label |
|---|---|---|
| 2003 | Lowest of the Low | Bridge 9 |
| 2007 | Rhythm Amongst the Chaos | Reaper |
| 2010 | "Keepers of the Faith" (7" single) | Reaper |
| 2012 | Hard Lessons/Only the Devil Knows | Reaper |
| 2017 | The Walls Will Fall | Pure Noise |
| 2020 | Sink to the Hell | War Records |

==== Split EPs ====
| Year | Album | Label |
|---|---|---|
| 2003 | Three Way Split (with The Promise and Plan of Attack) | Organized Crime |
| 2004 | Dead Man's Hand Vol. 2 (with Ringworm) | Deathwish Inc. |

=== Music videos ===
- "Push It Away" (2003)
- "Keep Your Mouth Shut" (2004)
- "Overcome" (2005)
- "Always the Hard Way" (2006)
- "Lost" (2006)
- "Betrayer" (2008)
- "Never Alone" (2008)
- "Rise of the Poisoned Youth" (2009)
- "Stick Tight" (2010)
- "Keepers of the Faith" (2011)
- "Return to Strength" (2011)
- "You're Caught" (2011)
- "The New Blood" (2012)
- "Live by the Code" (2013)
- "I'm Only Stronger" (2013)
- "The Most High" (2013)
- "Hard Lessons" (2014)
- "Shot of Reality" (2014)
- "Cold Truth" (2014)
- "Mind at War" (2015)
- "Bad Signs" (2015)
- "Sick and Tired" (2015)
- "Kill 'Em Off" (2017)
