= Live by the Code =

Studio album by Terror
- Released: April 5, 2013
- Genre: Hardcore
- Length: 26:39
- Label: Victory
- Producer: Chad Gilbert

Terror chronology
Keepers of the Faith (2010)	Live by the Code (2013)	The 25th Hour (2015)

Singles from Live by the Code
- 1. "Hard Lessons" Released: February 19, 2013; 2. "Live by the Code" Released: February 19, 2013

Live by the Code is the fifth studio album by American hardcore band Terror. It was released in 2013 via Victory Records. It is their first and only album to reach the Billboard 200 peaking at number 145, it also topped the US Heatseekers chart.

== Background ==
On January 15, 2013, it was announced Terror had signed with Victory Records to release their fifth studio album live by the Code. In a press release Scott Vogel described the album stating it "hits harder than 'Keepers Of The Faith'," calling it the "dirtiest, rawest and most hardcore record we've done since 'Lowest Of The Low'.

In an interview Scott Vogel described Live by the Code as a tribute to the hardcore scene’s foundational ethics — staying true, being genuine, and showing respect to those who came before.

“To me, the code is about doing things for the right reasons — not for money, not for fame, but for love of the music and the people around it.” “There’s a lot of fake stuff in the scene now. This record is about calling that out and keeping hardcore pure.”

== Release ==
On November 28, 2012 the first single "Hard lessons" was released. In December of 2012, the band announced the album would be released in early 2013. On February 12, 2013, the second single the title track was released, the songs music video was later released on February 18. The album was officially released on April 5, and sold around 3,200 copies in its first week. This marked Terrors first appearance on the Billboard 200 peaking at number 146, the album also reached number 1 on the US Heatseekers chart.

== Critical reception ==
The album was met with favorable reviews receiving a 70/100 accumulative score on Metacritic.

AllMusic wrote "With Live by the Code, the L.A. hardcore act crushes 11 songs in under 30 minutes. Their furious lyrics and chunky guitar lines are standard moshing and stage-diving material, but fans will be satisfied nonetheless. Yet another in a long list of quality outings." Luke Henderson of Lambgoat stated "With Live By The Code, Terror shows yet again why they have become known as one of the most consistent and highly regarded hardcore bands playing today." Keenan Harrison of Scene Point Blank gave the album a nearly perfect score stating "One of the most anticipated releases of 2013, Live By The Code delivers in every way possible. The raw aggression and formula that these guys have put together over their career continues to make gold. Full of sing a longs and throwbacks to the early sound with the metallic edge that Terror has become known for."

Professional ratings
Review scores
Source	Rating
About.com	4/5 stars
AbsolutePunk	(78%)
AllMusic	3/5 stars
Alternative Press	4/5 stars
Exclaim!	(5/10)
Lambgoat	8/10
Scene Point Blank	5/5 stars

== Track list ==
No.	Title	Length
1.	"The Most High"	2:44
2.	"Not Impressed"	2:01
3.	"Cold Truth"	2:59
4.	"I'm Only Stronger"	2:53
5.	"Live by the Code"	1:51
6.	"The Good Die Young"	2:09
7.	"Shot of Reality"	2:41
8.	"Hard Lessons"	2:43
9.	"Invasion"	2:20
10.	"Nothing in Your Head"	2:18
11.	"One Blood"	2:00
Total length:		26:39

== Credits ==
Terror

- Scott Vogel — vocals
- Jordan Posner — guitar
- Martin Stewart — guitar
- David Wood — bass
- Nick Jett — drums

Production

- Chad Gilbert — producer
- Matt Hyde — mixing, mastering
- Aaron Jamili — engineer
- Michael Bouzianis — engineer
- Morgan Newton — photographer

== Chart positions ==
Chart (2013)	Peak position
Belgian Albums (Ultratop Flanders)	173
Belgian Albums (Ultratop Wallonia)	176
German Albums (Offizielle Top 100)	80
US Billboard 200	145
US Independent Albums (Billboard)	28
US Top Rock Albums (Billboard)	42
