= Sworn Vengeance (band) =

American hardcore band

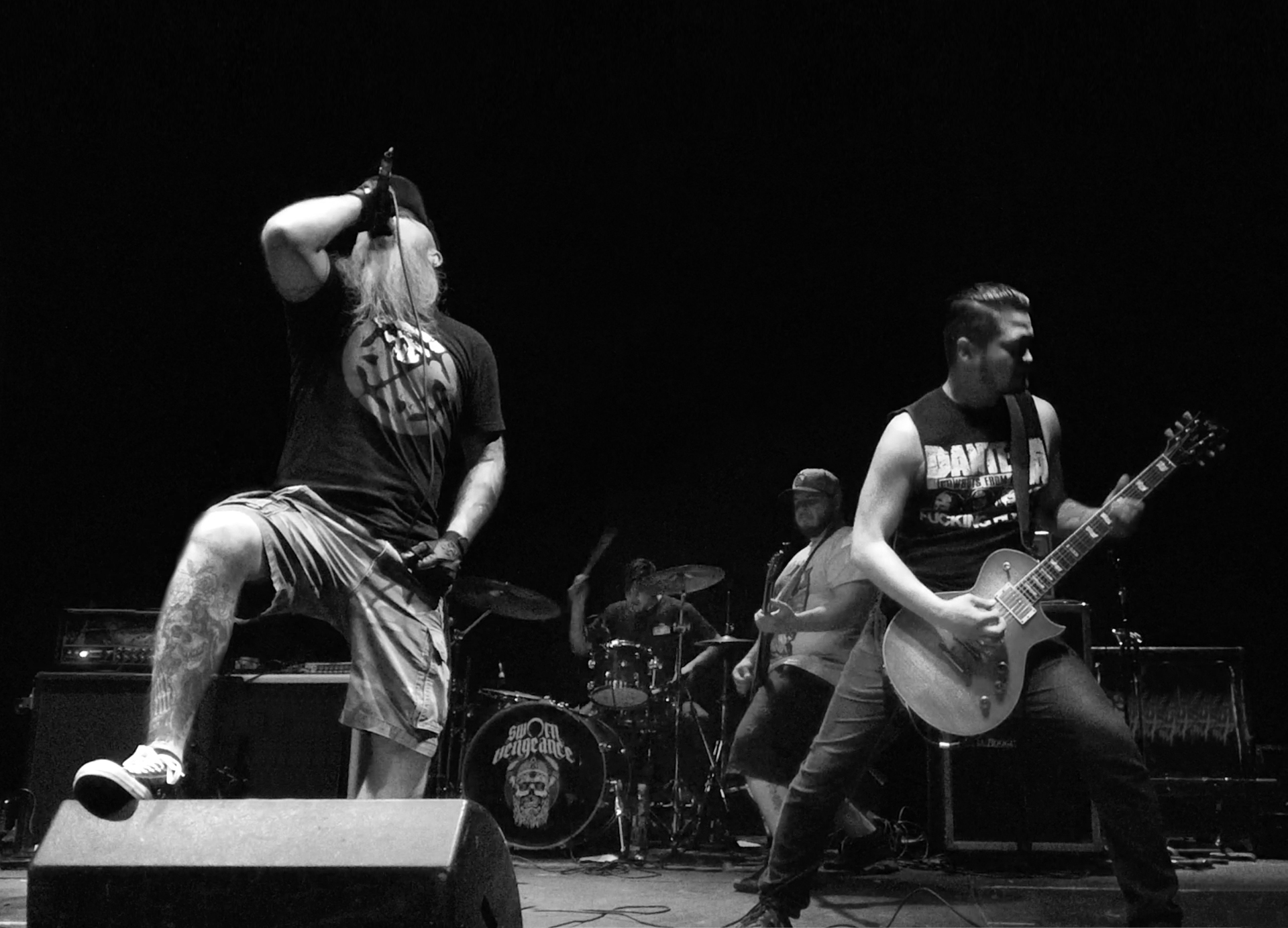

Background information
- Origin: San Francisco Bay Area, California, U.S.
- Genres: Hardcore punk, heavy hardcore, metallic hardcore
- Years active: 1998-2003, 2012-present
- Labels: Escapist Records (US); Goodlife Recordings (EUR)
- Members: Trey Derbes; Ryan Encinas; Alvan Friend; Jon Frost; Keith Welch
- Website: swornvengeanceband.com

Sworn Vengeance is an American hardcore band from the greater San Francisco Bay Area. Formed in 1997, the group has released 4 albums, a handful of 7" records and splits and have been featured on numerous compilations.

Sworn Vengeance has played shows and festivals throughout the U.S., Mexico, and Europe with Hatebreed, Sick of It All, Terror, Earth Crisis, Slapshot, Ringworm, The Old Firm Casuals, Hoods, Born From Pain, Shadows Fall, Xibalba, Rotting Out, NJ Bloodline, Vision of Disorder, Buried Alive, Snapcase, Glassjaw, One King Down, Lionheart, Cave In, Redemption 87, Animosity, Eighteen Visions, Embrace the End, Over My Dead Body, Papa Roach, Bleeding Through, and many more.

SV's current lineup is Trey Derbes on drums, Ryan Encinas on vocals, Alvan Friend on guitar, Jon Frost on bass, and Keith Welch on guitar.

== Discography ==
- My Friend Violence CD – 1998, demo
- Abbadon CD – 1999, Westcoast Worldwide Records
- Straight Edge: Rise of a New Era CD – 1999, Breakout Records (compilation CD)
- The Blood & The Chaos 7" – 1999, Back ta Basics Records
- Destroyer of Worlds 7" – 1999, One Scene Records (split record with All Bets Off)
- Contenders for the Crown CD – 1999, Westcoast Worldwide Records (split CD with Hoods, Above This World, Diseptikons, Pipedown and Execution Style)
- Domination CD – 2000, Breakout Records
- Worldwide CD – 2000, Westcoast Worldwide Records (compilation CD)
- Ascend from the Darkness CD – 2000, Dark Visions Records (compilation CD)
- My Friend Violence CD – 2001, A Reason Why Records (re-Issue of demo with live tracks and alternate versions of songs)
- 3 Way Split CD – 2001, One The Rise Records (split CD with NJ Bloodline and Settle the Score)
- Worldwide II CD – 2002, Westcoast Worldwide Records (compilation CD)
- 4 Way Death Match CD – 2002, Battlescarred Records (split CD with Hostility, Ex Inferis and Existence)
- Covered in Blood: A Tribute to Slayer's 'Reign in Blood' CD – 2002, Spook City Records (compilation CD)
- The Outstretched Arms of Damnation Digital – 2002, self-released
- ...And With This Hammer of Vengeance Record – 2014, Escapist Records
- ...And With This Hammer of Vengeance CD – 2014, Good Life Recordings
- Primeval Record – 2015, Knives Out Records (split record with St. Hood)

== Members ==
=== Current ===
- Trey Derbes (drums): 2022-present (Glacier Eater, Wilderness Dreams)
- Ryan Encinas (vocals): 1998–present (Downshift)
- Alvan Friend (guitar): 2017–present (Murder Practice)
- Jon Frost (bass): 2012–present (Light This City, At Our Heels, Glacier Eater)
- Keith Welch (guitar: 2014–present (Murder Practice, At Our Heels, Glacier Eater)

=== Former ===
- Brian Baumgartner (guitar): 1998–2015 (Downshift)
- Adam Encinas (bass): 1998, 2007
- Nate Olsen (guitar): 1998
- Bob Hookey (bass): 1998–1999
- Dan Coddaire (guitar): 1999–2000 (Set Your Goals)
- Marc Fortner (drums): 1998–2000 (Downshift)
- Carl Schwartz (bass): 2000–2003 (First Blood, Terror)
- Doug Weber (guitar): 2000–2003, 2011–2013 (Terror, First Blood)
- Ryan Wilson (bass): 2003 – Don Perrot Memorial Shows
- Tony Barbier (drums): 2000–2016 (Second Coming, Hard Luck, First Blood)
- Neil Dhawan (guitar): 2002–2017
- Bart Mullis (drums): 2017–2020 (Embrace the End, Killing the Dream)
