= Total Retaliation =

Studio album by Terror
- Released: September 28, 2018
- Genre: Hardcore
- Length: 28:26
- Label: Pure Noise
- Producer: Will Putney

Terror chronology
| The Walls Will Fall (2017) | Total Retaliation (2018) | Pain into Power (2022) |

Total Retaliation is the seventh studio album by American hardcore band Terror. It was released on September 28, 2018, by Pure Noise Records.

== Background and recording ==
On May 13, 2018, Terror began recording the album at Graphic Nature Audio in New Jersey with producer and engineer Will Putney.

When asked about the albums title lead singer Scott Vogel stated:

looking at the record as a whole, from the music to the lyrics, to the title, to the artwork, I guess negative… I guess it’s the most, I don’t know if negative is the right word, angry, aggressive… A lot of the Terror stuff, like One With The Underdogs like you mentioned or Overcome, are more like "OK the world has got these problems, and it’s a fucked up place, but keep your head together and you’re going to get through it." That’s a lot of the messages of Terror but on this, it’s more "The world’s a fucked up place and it’s getting more fucked up, and it doesn’t seem to be getting better".

Rapper Vinnie Paz features on the song "Post Armageddon Interlude".

== Release and promotion ==
On August 9, 2018, Terror announced the Total Retaliation release date and released the albums first single "Mental Demolition". The songs music video later primered on Decibel on April 3, 2019. On September 6, 2018, the second single "Spirit of Sacrifice" and its music video debuted on Consequence of Sound. Terror toured extensively in support of the album including the "Total Retaliation Invasion Tour" which included dates in North America, during the European leg of the tour they were supported by Deez Nuts and Risk. They also toured Australia.

== Critical reception ==
Professional ratings
Review scores
| Source | Rating |
|---|---|
| Blabbermouth.net | 8/10 |
| Exclaim! | 7/10 |
| Punknews | 3.5/5 stars |
| Ox-Fanzine | 4/5 stars |
| Visions.de | 7/12 |

Jay H. Gorania of Blabbermouth.net wrote "Total Retaliation" is the album that TERROR needed to prove that it still has it and that it's here to stay. It proves the quintet's longevity, and while it is tried and true TERROR in the most fundamental of ways, it's also diverse enough to merit listening to more than once. Exclaim! added "Terror are also more lyrically present on this outing. "Post Armageddon Interlude" touches on North America's polarizing and violent political climate, and Vogel arrives at provocative introspection and rehabilitation on "Spirit of Sacrifice." His time away from the band's touring schedule due to health issues was an absence that would usually damage the presence of most touring acts, but by the time the breakdown of the song hits, the album highlight cements Terror as an irresistible phenomenon that people will continue to swing limbs to in the long-term."

== Track listing ==
| No. | Title | Length |
|---|---|---|
| 1. | "This World Never Wanted Me" | 2:10 |
| 2. | "Mental Demolition" | 2:07 |
| 3. | "Get Off My Back" | 2:28 |
| 4. | "One More Enemy" | 2:23 |
| 5. | "Break the Lock" | 1:21 |
| 6. | "In Spite of These Times" | 2:22 |
| 7. | "Total Retaliation" | 1:52 |
| 8. | "Post Armageddon Interlude" | 1:34 |
| 9. | "Spirit of Sacrifice" | 2:24 |
| 10. | "I Don't Know You" | 2:12 |
| 11. | "Behind the Bars" | 2:30 |
| 12. | "Suffer the Edge of the Lies" | 2:02 |
| 13. | "Resistant to the Changes" | 3:01 |
| Total length: | | 28:26 |

== Personnel ==
Terror

- Scott Vogel – lead vocals
- Martin Stewart – guitar
- Jordan Posner – guitar
- Chris Linkovich – bass
- Nick Jett – drums

Technical personnel

- Will Putney – producer, mixing, mastering engineer

== Charts ==
Chart performance for Total Retaliation
| Chart (2018) | Peak position |
|---|---|
| Austrian Albums (Ö3 Austria) | 71 |
| Belgian Albums (Ultratop Flanders) | 113 |
| German Albums (Offizielle Top 100) | 48 |
| US Independent Albums (Billboard) | 12 |
| US Top Hard Rock Albums (Billboard) | 25 |
