= NJ Bloodline =

American hardcore band

- Origin: Elizabeth, New Jersey, U.S.
- Genres: Beatdown hardcore; tough guy hardcore
- Years active: 1992–2002, 2006–present
- Labels: Century Media Records/Kingfisher; Too Damn Hype Records; RPP Records; Coretex/MadMob Records
- Members: Wreak Havoc (Enrique Maseda); Frank Gallo; Joey Priolo; Ian Cosgrove
- Past members: Mario Simoes; Tony Simoes; Jay Crime; Jim M Ray The Chin, AKA Fat Ray (RIP)
- Website: njbloodline.com

NJ Bloodline is an American hardcore punk group from Elizabeth, New Jersey.

== History 1992–2002 ==
NJ Bloodline was formed in early 1992 in Elizabeth, New Jersey. The original lineup consisted of Mario Simoes (guitar), Tony Simoes (drums), Enrique Maseda, aka Wreak Havoc (vocals), Jim Marella (lead guitar) and Jay Crime (bass). NJ Bloodline recorded a self-financed 5 song demo EP in 1993 which was released D.I.Y. on cassette, after which Jim Marella left the group. NJ Bloodline then continued as a 4-piece. Between late 1994 and early 1995, Jay and Tony left NJ Bloodline and were replaced by Joey Priolo and Ray Chinowski (aka, Fat Ray-RIP). NJ Bloodline then officially broke up in the early summer of 1995. Joey and Ray immediately started a new project with guitarist Frank Gallo. Soon after, they recruiting Enrique on vocals and dubbed the project "DNC" (Do Not Cross). After enlisting Mario on second guitar in September 1995, they officially reformed in October 1995 as NJ Bloodline. However, in early December 1995, Ray quit to pursue other projects and was temporarily replaced by Tony (former drummer).

In early January 1996, Ian Cosgrove, formerly of Fat Nuts, was selected as NJ Bloodline's permanent drummer. Although only 15 years old, Ian already possessed considerable talent, especially with double bass drumming and already had experience in live performance, playing with Fatnuts. NJ Bloodline returned to performing in May 1996 in Scotch Plains, NJ with E.Town Concrete, Ensign and Strength 691, amongst others on the bill. NJ Bloodline spent the next year writing and rehearsing the material that would eventually comprise their next release, the "Be Afraid" Demo. Recorded at Third Studio From the Sun in Wayne, NJ in July 1997, in one weekend, the recording would be officially released in December 1997 on cassette, D.I.Y.. The demo cassette sold quickly through word of mouth and within a month was available in Japan and Europe through distro chains, garnering interest from Kingfisher Records (a division of Century Media Records), RPP Records (Belgium) and Resurrection AD (NJ).

In 1998, NJ Bloodline were quickly offered a recording deal with Resurrection AD Records. During the negotiations with Resurrection AD, Kingfisher, who had signed fellow NJHC peers Fury of Five, contacted NJ Bloodline and offered them a recording deal and were interested in re-releasing "Be Afraid" as a mini-CD. However, during the negotiations process, Kingfisher was closed by Century Media records, effectively ending negotiations. NJ Bloodline started working with Resurrection AD, which became quickly overburdened with their other artists. NJ Bloodline parted ways with Resurrection AD and signed with RPP Productions from Belgium. By this time, NJ Bloodline had already sold over 3500 copies of "Be Afraid" demo on cassette D.I.Y. without the benefit of a label, management company or radio. In lieu of this, The Be Afraid EP was re-released in the Fall of 1998 on the RPP Records. Early January 1999, Mario left NJ Bloodline and was replaced by local guitarist Dirty Rei Fonseca, formerly of One4One for live performances only. After their 1999 summer tour, which Rei did not attend, Rei was released on mutual terms to join Agents of Man.

In 2000, a revived Kingfisher contacted NJ Bloodline, expressing interest in NJ Bloodline recording a full-length album. NJ Bloodline was also approached by On the Rise Records, in conjunction with Coretext/MadMob Records (Germany) to do a three-band split CD with Settle the Score (Germany) and Sworn Vengeance (CA). In between their Summer Tour dates in 2000, NJ Bloodline recorded all the material that would comprise both the Faceless LP and the split CD at Third Studio From the Sun. The Faceless LP was released in the spring of 2001 in Europe and Japan through Kingfisher Records and in the United States by Too Damn Hype Records. An extensive Summer Tour, booked by M.A.D. Touring Agency (Germany), included such events as the With Full Force and Dour Festivals. Upon returning from Europe and completing their U.S. leg of their summer tour with Settle the Score, Ian quit NJ Bloodline. However, Ian returned in November 2001 to play a benefit show for a mutual friend of NJ Bloodline in Kenilworth, NJ, with Sworn Enemy, E.Town Concrete (In Full Effect), Shattered Realm, and December AE. This show would be NJ Bloodline's first ever "Weapon's Show" but also their last show for the next 5 years.

== 2002–present ==
After failing to find a suitable replacement for Ian, in the spring of 2002, Enrique left New Jersey to temporarily front the Sacto Hoods from California. Joey, who took the trip with Enrique, decided to move to Huntington Beach, CA permanently, restarted his side project, Libations. Frank continued with his career in Graphic/Web Design. In May 2002, it was announced on njbloodline.com that NJBL had, in fact, dissolved. In 2003, Frank co-founded a new band, eventually dubbed Homicidal, which included NJHC scene veterans from such bands as One4One, Bulldoze, Train of Thought, Fatnuts and The Human Offense. Additionally, Ian moved to Costa Mesa, California. Early 2004, Enrique returned to New Jersey and was recruited to sing for Homicidal. After recording a 4 song demo which was never released, Enrique quit. Enrique then co-founded a new band dubbed "Hell Brigade". In 2005, NJBL were asked to play what would be the last Hellfest in Elizabeth, NJ. Due to lingering issues between some members, NJBL declined. By 2006, Frank and Enrique had both quit their respective bands, Ian had moved back to the east coast and Joey's tenure with Libations came to an end.

In early 2006, fellow NJHC alumni, E.Town Concrete, contacted NJBL and asked them reunite for E.Town's last 2 headlining shows called the "End of the Rainbow weekend" in May 2006, at the Starland Ballroom in NJ. E.Town played their first live show as a "special guest" on NJBL's set at the Down Under in New Brunswick. After agreeing to reunite for the show, Frank, Wreak, Mario and Ian, started rehearsals after 5 years. Joey, who was still living in California at the time, would join them for rehearsals 2 weeks before the show. The response at the Starland show was overwhelmingly positive, thus inspiring NJBL to perform for the rest of the summer, locally and out of state. The group had renewed their friendships and decided to play on a limited basis, mostly summers, due to life commitments and members living in various states. In May 2007, NJBL headlined the Filled With Hate Festival in Essen, Germany. In 2008, NJBL performed in Puerto Rico with Billy Club Sandwich and then headlined 2 shows in Belgium and Germany.

NJBL has only performed a handful of gigs since 2009, including in and out of state. Most recently NJBL performed on June 25 and 26, 2010, respectively, at the Side Bar in Baltimore, Maryland and at Dingbatz in Clifton, NJ. Since then, there has not been any reported activity on their website, Facebook and Myspace pages.

On August 26, 2020, it was announced vocalist Enrique Maseda had died.

== Band members ==
=== Current ===
- Frank Gallo – guitar (1995–2002, 2006–present)
- Joey Priolo – bass (1995–2002, 2006–present)
- Ian Cosgrove – drums (1996–2002, 2006–present)

=== Former ===
- Enrique "Wreak Havoc" Maseda – vocals (1992–2002, 2006–2020)
- Mario Simoes – guitar (1992–1998, 2006–2008)
- Tony Simoes – drums (1992–1994)
- Jim Marella – guitar (1992–1993)
- Jay Crime – bass (1993–1995)
- "Fat" Ray Chojnowski – drums (1994–1996)

== Discography ==
Year	Official albums, demos and splits	US Chart Position	Label	Additional Info
1992	A Common Cause (NJHC)	n/a	Reaction Records	released on Cassette
1993	Self Titled Demo, AKA The 1993 Demo	n/a	Released by Band	released on Cassette
1997	Be Afraid, AKA The Red Demo	n/a	Released by Band	released on Cassette
1998	Be Afraid	n/a	RPP Records	released on CD
1998	Songs to Bleed To	n/a	Thornz Records	released as a Limited Edition 7 inch vinyl only
1998	Split 7 inch	n/a	Spill The Blood Records	Split 7 inch with One4One
2000	3 Way Split CD	n/a	Coretex Records; OTR Records	3 Way Split CD with Settle the Score from Germany and Sworn Vengeance from California
2000	Hardcore 2000	n/a	Kingfisher records Century Media Records	Double CD Compilation including other notable acts such as the Cro-Mags, Ryker's, Sworn Enemy, Madball, Merauder, Fury of Five, Stampin' Ground and Slapshot.
2000	Westcoast Worldwide Compilation	n/a	Westcoast Worldwide Records	CD Compilation including other notable acts such as the Hoods, Breakdown, Ryker's, Redline, Punishment, Stampin' Ground and Sworn Vengeance.
2001	Faceless (LP)	n/a	Century Media; Kingfisher Records	First Full Length LP, also released on Limited Edition Colored Vinyl

== Other information ==
- NJ Bloodline was originally named "Bloodline", after song lyrics Enrique had written. The song was scrapped but the name stayed. However, due to other groups already using the moniker "Bloodline", New Jersey or NJ, was added prior to recording the 1993 demo, to distinguish where the band was from.
- NJ Bloodline used to cover many songs live in the early days, including, but not limited to, songs by The Cro-Mags, Killing Time, Leeway, Bad Brains, The Beastie Boys, The NY Hoods and S.O.D.
- Joel from the Human Offense once played bass for NJ Bloodline and helped finish the song "Out Of Place", by contributing the ending bass segment.
- Ian Cosgrove was only 15 years old when he recorded his drums on the Be Afraid EP, turning 16 the following month.
- The cover art to the Be Afraid EP was created by guitarist Frank Gallo, who being an artist had graduated from The School of Visual Arts as an Illustrator. The image is a mixed media piece of John Wayne Gacy, the serial killer, dressed up as Pogo the Clown.
- The song "L.E.T.S." from the Be Afraid EP, stands for "Lord of the E.town Streets".
- NJ Bloodline has used a few different tunings. The 1993 Demo utilizes Standard "E" tuning. The Be Afraid EP utilizes "D" Standard tuning and is micro tuned slightly sharp. The Faceless LP and the split CD tracks utilizes "D" Standard tuning. NJ Bloodline has never used Drop "D" or "C" tunings.
- E.T.A.C., which stands for "Elizabeth Town Assault Crew", A.K.A. "E.Town Assault Crew" was a crew formed by NJ Bloodline, HardKnox and Money Grip members. Cited in E.Town Concrete lyrics on their "Time to Shine" LP, E.T.A.C. is falsely presumed to have been created by or a part of E.Town Concrete. In fact, it was E.T.A.C. members, such as Uncle Mark (R.I.P.), Will Knox, Wreak Havoc and Joey Priolo that helped a very young high school age E.Town Concrete play their first shows and gain acceptance into the NJHC scene, hence the line from the record stating "E.T.A.C. got my back, no need to worry kid".
- Frank and Wreak were both members of the original lineup of the NJ Hardcore band Homicidal. In fact, Frank is one of the two original founding members.
- The song "Blackout No. 1" was the last song written by NJ Bloodline prior to their breakup in 1995. It is the only song written by the lineup of Wreak, Fat Ray, Mario and Joey.
- The songs "Blackout No. 2" and "A Love Song" were written prior to NJ Bloodline reforming and while Fat Ray was drumming. Although originally written in standard tuning, a decision was made to play "A Love Song" in "D" standard. NJ Bloodline stayed in "D" standard ever since. This is also why there are 2 versions of the song "Blackout".
- As DNC (Do Not Cross) Frank, Wreak, Joey and Fat Ray played just one show in late 1995 in Long Island with 25 ta Life, Fury of Five and 141, before recruiting Mario and reforming NJ Bloodline.
- Their debut LP Faceless is a concept record. The overriding theme is the alienation the group felt going from a small close knit local scene to the larger music industry, where all musical groups are a product on a shelf with a bar code number and their worth is only validated through record sales, not through artistic expression. This theme crosses over to their split CD release and the faux answering machine message prior to the song "Blackout No. 1", where their "agent" discusses ways to increase their appeal.
- The song "Faceless" is the last song NJ Bloodline ever wrote and is the climatic lyrical theme to their debut LP of the same name, while also being the inspiration for the LP's concept.
