= Still Suffer =

Studio album by Terror
- Released: April 24, 2026
- Studios: The Pit Recording Studio, Brooklyn, New York
- Genre: Hardcore
- Length: 27:16
- Label: Flatspot
- Producer: Todd Jones

Terror chronology
Pain into Power (2022)	Still Suffer (2026)

Singles from Still Suffer
- 1. "Still Suffer" Released: February 24, 2026; 2. "Destruction of My Soul" Released: March 25, 2026; 3. "Fear the Panic" Released: April 14, 2026

Still Suffer is the ninth studio album by American hardcore band Terror. Produced by Todd Jones and Taylor Young, the album was released on April 24, 2026 via Flatspot Records.

== Background and recording ==
Terror first announced the album title Still Suffer on July 16, 2025 with an expected release date of early 2026. Terror then announced the album’s official release date of April, 24, 2026 on February 24.

Still Suffer was produced by the bands former guitarist Todd Jones, stuck Twitching Tongues' Taylor Young contributed extra production at his Pit studio in Los Angeles, California where the album was recorded. The album was mixed by Jon Markson and mastering was done by Brad Boatright at Audiosiege in Portland, Oregon.

The album features collaborations with Hot Water Music's Chuck Ragan, Mindforce's Jay Peta, King Nine's Dan Seely, and God's Hate frontman/AEW wrestler Brody King.

== Release and promotion ==
The first single the albums title track was released on February 24, 2026, and was accompanied by an official music video directed by Derek Rathbun. The second single "Destruction of My Soul" was released on March 25, alongside a lyric video. The third and final single "Fear the Panic" featuring Hot Water Music vocalist Chuck Ragan was released on April 14, and also had a music video directed by Derek Rathbun.

Prior to the albums release on April 23, Terror released a 30 minute documentary titled A Deeper Struggle. Just like the music video for the album the film was directed by Rathbun. It follows the band on a Latin America tour where they discuss the band’s history along with how Still Suffer was made.

The band announced a North American headlining tour in support of the album alongside Pain of Truth that will go from late April to early June. They also took part in the second leg of the Summer Slaughter tour alongside Hatebreed, and will co-headline a European tour with Bane in the Winter.

== Critical reception ==
Professional ratings
Review scores
Source	Rating
Kerrang!	3/5
Blabbermouth.net	7/10
Ghost Cult Magazine	9/10
BrooklynVegan	Positive
New Noise Magazine	4.5/5 stars
Ox-Fanzine	4/5 stars

Blabbermouth.net gave the album a 7/10 stating "TERROR continue to merge violent riffs and bouncy rhythms on every single track, alternating between pit-friendly slow groove and manic thrash metal. Proving, yet again, that they are one of the best meat 'n' potatoes hardcore bands ever." Dan Slessor of Kerrang! added "If Still Suffer achieves anything, it's helping to prove hardcore's rude health in 2026, and that those making it while starting to grow a little long in the tooth remain a formidable force not to be underestimated." BrooklynVegan claimed that the guest vocals made Still Suffer "even more of a blast than it would’ve been without them".

Hutch of New Noise Magazine gave the album a nearly perfect score stating "Terror continues their reign. They embarked to record a thunderous, captivating record perfect for venting. Accomplished. Still Suffer unifies its listeners at shows, alienates them in the world. Bask in that isolation. Point your rage at society and unleash. This is a new milestone of enmity in hardcore."

== Track listing ==
All tracks are written by Jordan Posner, Scott Vogel, and Nicholas Jett, except where noted.

Still Suffer track listing
No.	Title	Length
1.	"Erase You From My World"	1:24
2.	"Still Suffer"	2:25
3.	"Promised Only Lies"	1:24
4.	"Destruction Of My Soul"	1:50
5.	"Fear The Panic" (featuring Chuck Ragan)	2:58
6.	"Death Of Hope"	1:49
7.	"Beauty In The Losses" (featuring Jay Peta)	2:44
8.	"A Deeper Struggle"	2:30
9.	"To Hurt The Most"	1:24
10.	"Deconstruct It" (featuring Brody King and Dan Seely)	8:01
Total length:		27:16

== Personnel ==
Credits adapted from the album's liner notes and Tidal.

=== Terror ===
- Scott Vogel – lead vocals
- Nick Jett – drums
- Martin Stewart – rhythm guitar, backing vocals
- Jordan Posner – lead guitar
- Chris Linkovich – bass, backing vocals

=== Guest musicians ===
- Brody King – vocals
- Chuck Ragan – vocals
- Jay Peta – vocals
- Dan Seely – vocals

=== Technical staff ===
- Todd Jones – production
- Taylor Young – co production
- Jon Markson – mixing
- Brad Boatright – mastering

== Charts ==
Chart (2026)	Peak position
Belgian Albums (Ultratop Flanders)	133
French Rock & Metal Albums (SNEP)	33
German Albums (Offizielle Top 100)	31
German Rock & Metal Albums (Offizielle Top 100)	8
Swiss Albums (Schweizer Hitparade)	88
UK Album Downloads (OCC)	68
UK Independent Albums Breakers (OCC)	18
UK Rock & Metal Albums (OCC)	33
US Top Album Sales (Billboard)	50

== Appearances in media ==
- "Still Suffer" was used as the theme for the AEW pay-per-view Double or Nothing (2026).
