= The 25th Hour (Terror album) =

Studio album by Terror
- Released: August 7, 2015
- Genre: Hardcore
- Length: 22:46
- Label: Victory
- Producer: Ben Cook

Terror chronology
Live by the Code (2013)	The 25th Hour (2015)	The Walls Will Fall (2017)

Professional ratings
Review scores
Source	Rating
Blabbermouth.net	8.5/10
AlreadyHeard.com	4/5 stars
ToxicOnline.co.uk	7.5/10 stars

The 25th Hour is the sixth studio album by American hardcore band Terror, released on August 7, 2015.

It was recorded in January 2015 by Paul Miner at Buzzbomb Soundlabs, mixed by Tom Soares at Reel 4 Reel, and mastered by Drew Lavyne.

== Track listing ==
No.	Title	Length
1.	"The 25th Hour"	1:22
2.	"No Time for Fools"	1:34
3.	"Bad Signs"	1:12
4.	"Feed the Rats"	1:08
5.	"The Solution"	1:52
6.	"Blinded by the Lights"	2:28
7.	"Trust No Face" (feat. Ben Cook)	1:05
8.	"Why?"	1:37
9.	"Mind at War"	1:31
10.	"Snap"	1:15
11.	"Sick and Tired"	1:08
12.	"Life Goes On"	2:22
13.	"Both of You"	2:07
14.	"Deep Rooted"	2:05
Total length:		22:46

== Personnel ==
Terror

- Scott Vogel – vocals
- Jordan Posner – guitar
- Martin Stewart – guitar
- David Wood – bass
- Nick Jett – drums

Additional gang vocals

- Cesar Trejo
- Colin Young
- Taylor Young
- Albo Felix
- Dan Weinraub
- Andrew Kline
- Nate Blauvelt
- Ben Cook

== Charts ==
Chart performance for The 25th Hour
Chart (2015)	Peak position
Belgian Albums (Ultratop Flanders)	83
German Albums (Offizielle Top 100)	46
US Independent Albums (Billboard)	17
US Top Hard Rock Albums (Billboard)	8
US Top Rock Albums (Billboard)	33
