= Keepers of the Faith =

Studio album by Terror
- Released: November 10, 2010
- Genre: Hardcore
- Length: 39:02
- Label: Century Media
- Producer: Chad Gilbert

Terror chronology
The Damned, the Shamed (2008)	Keepers of the Faith (2010)	Live by the Code (2013)

Professional ratings
Review scores
Source	Rating
Metal Hammer Germany	6/7
Ox-Fanzine	5/5 stars

Keepers of the Faith is the fourth studio album by American hardcore band Terror. It was released in 2010 via Century Media Records.

== Track list ==
No.	Title	Length
1.	"Your Enemies Are Mine"	1:40
2.	"Stick Tight"	2:33
3.	"Return to Strength"	2:40
4.	"The Struggle"	2:20
5.	"Shattered"	2:35
6.	"You're Caught"	2:18
7.	"Dead Wrong"	2:50
8.	"Keepers of the Faith"	3:12
9.	"Stay Free"	2:18
10.	"Hell and Back"	3:05
11.	"Only Death"	2:25
12.	"The New Blood"	2:31
13.	"Defiant"	2:56
14.	"T.T.I.H."	2:47
15.	"Boxed In"	2:52
Total length:		39:02
