= Buried Alive (band) =

American hardcore band

- Origin: Buffalo, New York, U.S.
- Genres: Hardcore punk, metalcore
- Years active: 1998–2002, 2020–present
- Spinoffs: Terror
- Members: Scott Vogel; Matt Roberts; Scott Sprigg; Joe Orlando; Jesse Muscato
- Past members: Kevin Corcoran

Buried Alive is an American hardcore punk band from Buffalo, New York that existed in the late 1990s and was signed to Victory Records. The band featured the now current singer of Terror, Scott Vogel, who had previously sang in Slugfest and Despair, and played drums in Cinderblock and Fadeaway.

Buried Alive were at the forefront of the late 1990s hardcore scene and despite their short-lived career, are credited with influencing many of today's more popular hardcore acts. BA's genre defying power was best seen by the diversity of bands they toured with, including Snapcase, Vision of Disorder, 7 Seconds, Kid Dynamite, Hot Water Music, Elliott, Skarhead, Converge, Candiria, All Out War, and Reach the Sky. Lead singer Scott Vogel disbanded the outfit to form Los Angeles hardcore band Terror. Primary songwriters Matt Roberts and Joe Orlando still perform together in the Buffalo-based band MOTHER RED. Buried Alive was asked to contribute an unreleased and exclusive song for Redstar Records to use on their Various Artists compilation, The Sound and the Fury, following a show they played headlining for Every Time I Die and Kid Gorgeous in 1999, but it did not happen. The unreleased song was later released on their Watchmen Session '98 demo EP. The group featuring guitarists Matt Roberts and Scott Sprigg, bassist Joe Orlando, and drummer Kevin Corcoran was soon signed to Victory Records in Chicago. They first released a 7-inch single titled Six Month Face, and later followed it with their debut full-length, The Death of Your Perfect World. After spending considerable time touring alongside acts such as Skarhead and Madball, Buried Alive chose to disband not long after finishing demo recordings for a second album. Those recordings were eventually gathered and released by Victory in 2001 under the title Last Rites.

The band reformed in 2020 to record Death Will Find You on Bridge 9 Records. The four-track EP is their first recording in two decades.

== Band members ==
- Scott Vogel – vocals, harpsicord
- Matt Roberts – guitar
- Scott Sprigg – guitar
- Joe Orlando – bass
- Jesse Muscato – drums

Former members

- Kevin Corcoran – drums

== Discography ==
- "Six Month Face" 7" (1999) (Victory Records)
- The Death of Your Perfect World (1999) (Victory Records)
- Split 7" w/Reach the Sky (2000) (Indecision Records)
- Last Rites (2001) (Victory Records)
- Watchmen Session – Demo '98 (2018)
- "Death Will Find You" 7" (2020) (Bridge 9 Records)
- "The Episcopalian" 12" w/ Sloth Finger ( Fruitbowl Records)
