= Always the Hard Way =

Studio album by Terror
- Released: July 25, 2006
- Recorded: Planet Z, Massachusetts
- Genre: Hardcore
- Length: 28:56
- Label: Trustkill
- Producer: Zeuss

Terror chronology
One with the Underdogs (2004)	Always the Hard Way (2006)	The Damned, the Shamed (2008)

Professional ratings
Review scores
Source	Rating
Lambgoat	6/10 stars

Always the Hard Way is an album by American beatdown hardcore band Terror, released on the Trustkill label in 2006. The album also features a guest appearance by Mr. Dibbs and Murs (credited as "Mr. Murs") as a rap interlude, Aaron Cooley of Death Threat on "You Can't Break Me", and on "So Close to Defeat", a vocal performance is given by Eddie Sutton of Leeway.

== Track listing ==
1. "All for Revenge" – 1:54
2. "Strike You Down" – 1:44
3. "Survival Comes Crashing In" – 2:03
4. "Always the Hard Way" – 2:33
5. "Lost" – 2:19
6. "Last of the Diehards" – 1:23
7. "So Close to Defeat" – 2:03
  - Guest vocals: Eddie Sutton
8. "Test My Convictions" – 2:22
9. "Hell to Pay" – 2:24
10. "One Step Behind" – 1:40
11. "You Can't Break Me" – 2:16
  - Guest vocals: Aaron Butkus
12. "Dibbs and Murs Check In (interlude)" – 1:09
  - Bass – Ryan Rockwell
  - Drums – Rob Viktum
  - Producer – Mr. Dibbs
  - Vocals – Murs
13. "Hardship Belongs to Me" – 2:44
14. "Smash Through You" – 2:39

Many websites have conflicting track listings. Most notably, tracks 8 and 10 are often switched, most of the tracks from 12 to the end are mixed up, and the songs Survival Comes Crashing Down and Hardship Belongs To Me are shortened to Survival and Hardship. Dibbs And Murs Check In is often not even on a track listing.
