= The Damned, the Shamed =

Studio album by Terror
- Released: May 26, 2008
- Recorded: Planet-Z
- Genre: Hardcore
- Length: 30:46
- Label: Century Media
- Producer: Zeuss

Terror chronology
Always the Hard Way (2006)	The Damned, the Shamed (2008)	Keepers of the Faith (2010)

Professional ratings
Review scores
Source	Rating
AllMusic	3.5/5 stars
Lambgoat	link

The Damned, the Shamed is the third full-length album release by American hardcore band Terror.

== Track listing ==
1. "Voice of the Damned"
2. "Relentless Through and Through"
3. "Betrayer"
4. "Rise of the Poisoned Youth"
5. "Never Alone"
6. "What I Despise"
7. "Let Me Sink"
8. "Feel the Pain"
9. "Lost Our Minds"
10. "March to Redemption"
11. "Crush What's Weak"
12. "Still Believe"
13. "Suffer, to Return Harder"
14. "Iron Mind" (bonus track on European version)
