= Kublai Khan (band) =

American hardcore band

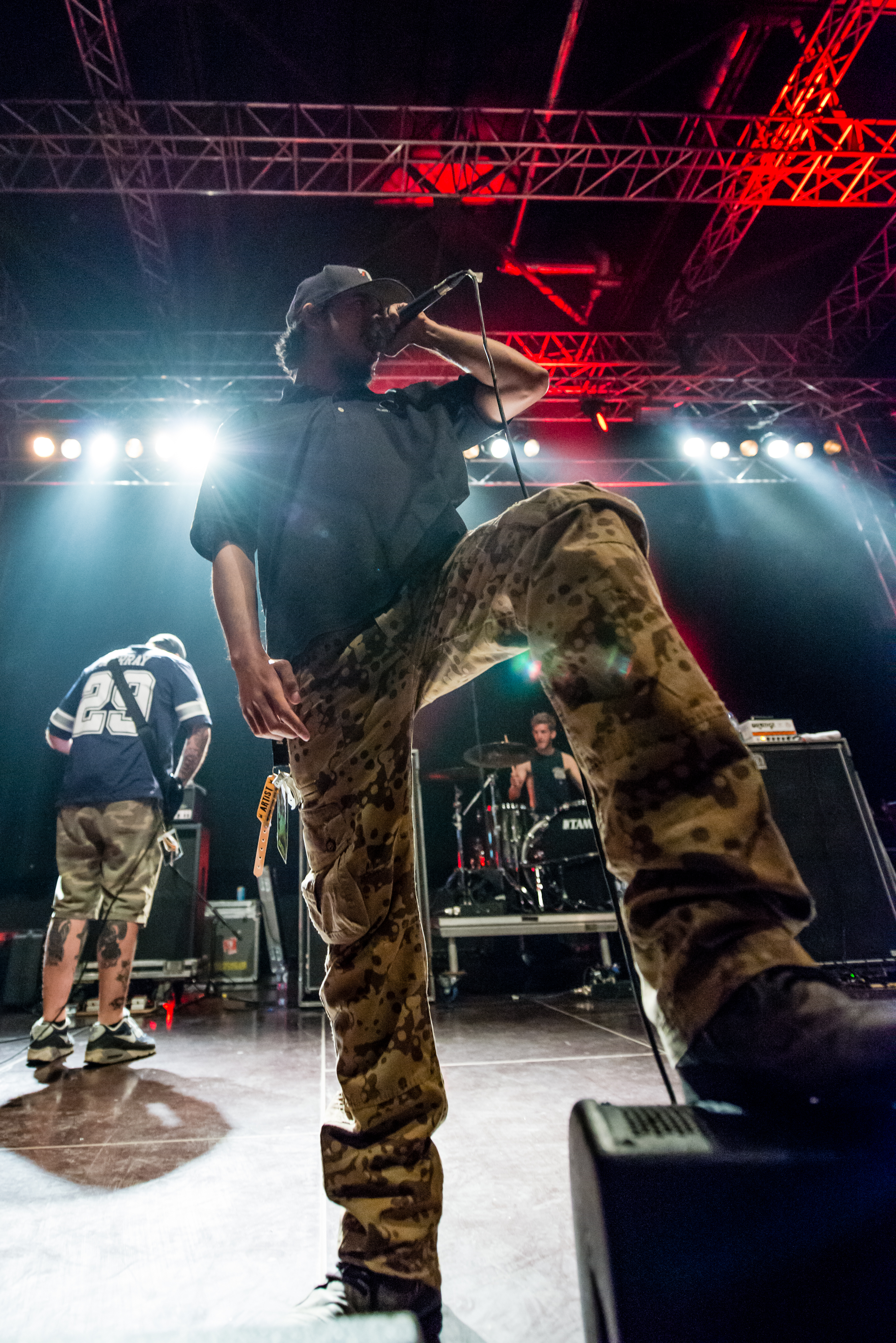
- Kublai Khan performing in 2015

Background information
- Also known as: Kublai Khan TX
- Origin: Sherman, Texas, U.S.
- Genres: Metalcore; beatdown hardcore
- Years active: 2009–present
- Labels: Rise; Artery
- Members: Matt Honeycutt; Eric English; Isaac Lamb; Nicholas Adams
- Past members: Eric Waldrum; Micah Hutson; BJ Ownby; Nolan Ashley; Korey Keeton
- Website: kublaikhantx.com

Kublai Khan (Note: The band is referred to as Kublai Khan TX in released and promotional material following a conflict with the Minnesota thrash metal band of the same name.) is an American metalcore band from Sherman, Texas. The group formed in the summer of 2009, and they have released five albums and two EPs.

== Career ==
Kublai Khan self-released their first EP, Youth War, in 2010. In February 2014, Kublai Khan signed to Artery Recordings. On April 29, 2014, the band released their debut full-length album Balancing Survival and Happiness. The album was listed in Alternative Press's "The Best Albums of 2014 So Far" list. On November 27, 2015, Kublai Khan released their second album New Strength. In July 2017, Kublai Khan signed to Rise Records, and on September 29, 2017, they released their third full-length album Nomad. In 2019, the band released their fourth full-length album Absolute.

The band released their EP Lowest Form of Animal released on April 1, 2022. On September 20, 2024, the band released their fifth album Exhibition of Prowess. On September 10, 2025 they released their single The Mountain of Corsicana.

In the Spring of 2026, they supported Lamb of God on a North American tour.

== Musical style and lyrics ==
Kublai Khan play a style of metalcore reminiscent of the early 1990s metallic hardcore scene (Integrity, Earth Crisis, All Out War, Hatebreed). The band employs heavy, slow breakdowns, heavily downtuned guitars (sometimes 7-string guitars tuned to drop G#) and raspy vocals.

They also touch on socially conscious issues such as racism ("Color Code", "No Kin"), human rights, violent police profiling and brutality ("True Fear"), organized religion ("B.C."), depression ("Belligerent"), social anxiety ("The Hammer"), and violence against women/the sex trade ("Swan Song").

== Band members ==
Current members

- Matt Honeycutt – vocals (2009-)
- Eric English – bass, vocals(2013-)
- Isaac Lamb – drums(2009-)
- Nicholas Adams — guitar, vocals(2025-)

Session/touring musicians

- Tom Reyes – guitar (2013)
- Jayson Braffett – guitar (2017–2019)
- Andy Marsh – guitar (2023)
- Sean Delander – bass (2023)
- Randy LeBoeuf – guitar (2024)
Former members
- Eric Waldrum – guitar
- Korey Keeton - bass
- Micah Hutson – guitar
- BJ Ownby – bass
- Nolan Ashley – guitar(2009-2025)

== Discography ==
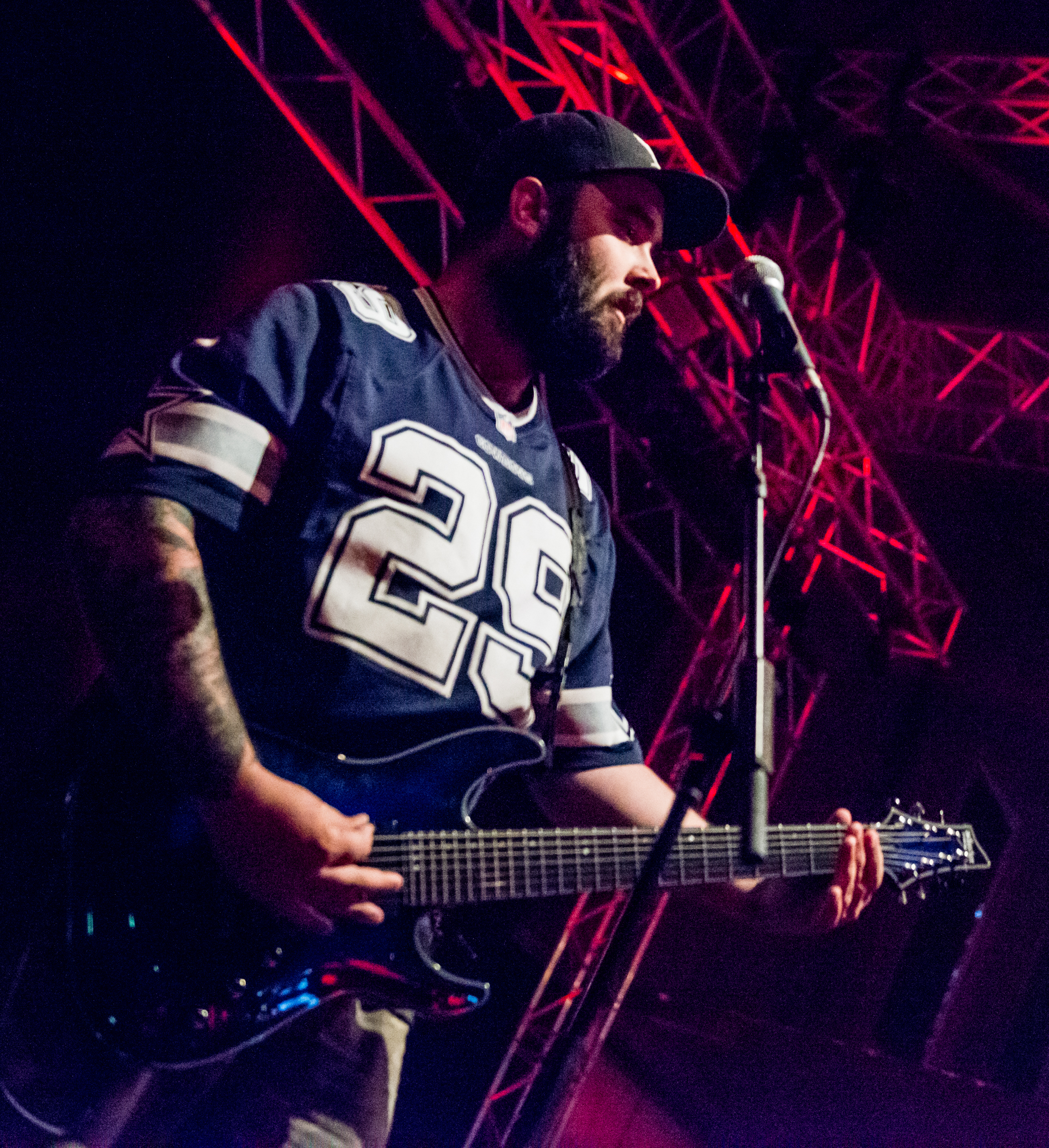
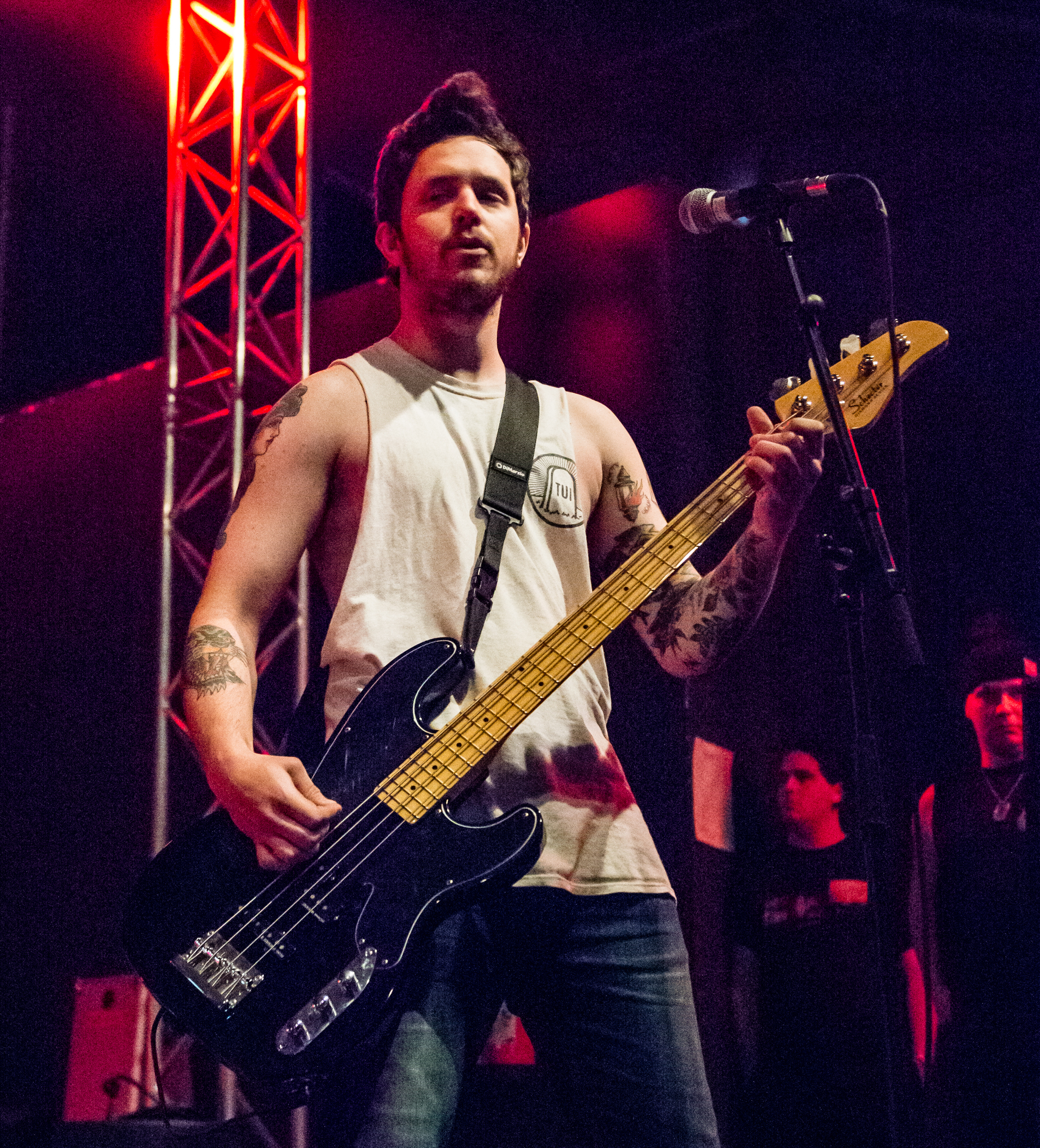
Kublai Khan in 2015

=== Studio albums ===
- Balancing Survival and Happiness (2014)
- New Strength (2015)
- Nomad (2017)
- Absolute (2019)
- Exhibition of Prowess (2024)

=== EPs ===
- Youth War (2010, self-released)
- Lowest Form of Animal (2022, Rise)

=== Singles ===
- "The Hammer" (2017)
- "Belligerent" (2017)
- "Self-Destruct" (2019)
- "The Truest Love" (2019)
- "Resentment" (2021)
- "Swan Song (feat. Scott Vogel)" (2022)
- "Loyal to None" (2022)
- "Taipan" (2022)
- "Theory of Mind" (2023)
- "Low Tech" (2024)
- "Supreme Ruler" (2024)
- "The Mountain of Corsicana" (2025)

==== As featured artist ====
- "Another Nail for Your Coffin" (Lamb of God feat. Kublai Khan TX & Malevolence) (2024)
