= Lowest of the Low (EP) =

EP by Terror
- Released: October 13, 2003
- Genre: Hardcore
- Length: 16:28
- Label: Bridge 9

Terror chronology
Lowest of the Low (2003)	One with the Underdogs (2004)

Lowest of the Low is an EP by American hardcore punk band Terror. It was released on Bridge 9 Records in 2003 and re-released on Trustkill Records in 2005. It was the band's first release recorded with bassist Richard Thurston.

== Overview ==
The EP is somewhat of a compilation. It includes Terror’s demo songs, their two songs from their 7" on Takeover Records along with two new songs. They wrote the demo in late 2001 into early 2002 those songs include "What Have We Done," "Life and Death," "Nothing to Me," "Another Face". The two songs from the 7” were written shortly after, before the groups first show in April of 2002 those songs were "Push It Away," "I Don’t Need Your Help." "Better Off Without You," "Keep Your Distance," and "Lowest of the Low" were all written sometime prior to the group entering the studio in 2003.

During the process of recording the EP the hardcore genre was in a transitional period where more people were moving away from the genre. However with this recording Terror wanted to maintain the tradition hardcore sound vocalist Scott Vogel stated "We didn't identify with that at all and we wanted to double down on hardcore and really show hardcore culture and identity to people." The music was written by guitarist Todd Jones and Nick Jett while Vogel wrote all the lyrics. Vogel later admitted writing the lyrics for the EP were easy due to the energetic nature of the songs. The band recorded the EP at Mars studio in Cleveland, Ohio it was recorded in three days and mixed and mastered 5 days later by Bill Korceky.

Commenting on the recording process guitars Todd Jones stated:

We were just extremely focused on the recording and put all our efforts into that. We certainly had a good time in the studio. It wasn't stressful and everything went smoothly. Towards the end of the recording, we had some of our Cleveland area friends come and do group vocals. Frank Novinec (Confront, Ringworm, Hatebreed) and Human Furnace (Ringworm) came to the studio and Furnace did a vocal spot.

Terror was in communication with both Bridge 9 Records and Indecision Records to release the EP, ultimately choosing Bridge 9 after the label offered to buy them their first touring van if they signed with them. In 2005 it was re-released on Trustkill Records, featuring three bonus tracks and 10 live renditions of their songs during a Japan tour.

In December 2022, Terror held a mini US tour playing Lowest of the Low in its entirety.

== Critical reception ==
Professional ratings
Review scores
Source	Rating
AllMusic	3/5 stars
Blabbermouth.net	7.5/10
Exclaim!	Highly Positive
Lambgoat	link
Metal.de	9/10
Ox-Fanzine	8/10
Punknews	5/5 stars

The EP was met with positive reception Paul Gresch of Exclaim! called it an "absolute masterpiece of a debut record." Adding "The nine short, fast, straight-up hardcore songs on this album are exactly what you'd expect from this band and there isn't a disappointing second on this release. For those of you who have been disgusted with the recent bastardising of the word "hardcore," have no fear, as Terror are sure to make you remember exactly what it means." Metal.de wrote "This is what hardcore should sound like... exactly like this, and nothing else." Punknews added "It does run fairly short, but that won't leave you any reason to complain, because you'll want to listen to it repeatedly. If you're into hard hitting stuff, you'll love this. If you're into old school NYHC stuff, you'll love this. If you like hardcore, you'll love it."

=== Legacy ===
The EP is viewed as an important record in Terror’s discography along with serving as an important release for Bridge 9 Records. Chris Wrenn founder of Bridge 9 stated in a 2018 interview:

That record was a big deal for Bridge Nine, it helped me bring the label to the next level, and all of the people it attracted stuck around and got hyped on the rest of our roster. I placed my first full-color magazine ads for Lowest of the Low, released the label’s first music video for “Push It Away” (directed by Ian McFarland / The Godfathers of Hardcore), did licensing deals with labels in Japan, Europe, and South America.

== Track listing ==
No.	Title	Length
1.	"Better Off Without You"	2:03
2.	"Don't Need Your Help"	1:46
3.	"Nothing to Me"	2:14
4.	"Keep Your Distance"	1:26
5.	"Another Face"	1:56
6.	"Push It Away"	2:19
7.	"Life and Death"	0:58
8.	"What Have We Done"	1:53
9.	"Lowest of the Low"	1:53
Total length:		16:28
