= One with the Underdogs =

Studio album by Terror
- Released: July 27, 2004
- Recorded: Sound City Studios, Van Nuys, California
- Genre: Hardcore
- Length: 32:28
- Label: Trustkill (worldwide); Roadrunner (UK)
- Producer: Terror

Terror chronology
Lowest of the Low (2003)	One with the Underdogs (2004)	Always the Hard Way (2006)

Professional ratings
Review scores
Source	Rating
Lambgoat	8/10

One with the Underdogs is the debut full-length release by American beatdown hardcore band Terror. It was released in the US through Triple-B Records and in Germany through Dead Serious Records.

== Track listing ==
1. "One with the Underdogs" – 1:26
2. "Keep Your Mouth Shut" – 2:21
3. "Less Than Zero" – 1:50
4. "Are We Alive?" – 1:39
5. "Overcome" – 2:26
6. "Spit My Rage" (feat. Jamey Jasta & Lord Ezec) – 2:02
7. "No One Cares" – 1:14
8. "Not This Time" – 3:04
9. "Crushed by the Truth" (feat. Hard Corey) – 0:57
10. "Out of My Face" – 2:14
11. "All I've Got" – 2:31
12. "Find My Way" (feat. Freddy Cricien) – 2:20
13. "Enemies in Sight" – 8:24
