= Born to Expire =

Studio album by Leeway
- Released: January 21, 1989
- Recorded: November 1987
- Studio: Normandy Sound, Warren, Rhode Island
- Genre: Crossover thrash, hardcore punk
- Length: 37:44
- Label: Profile Records/Rock Hotel
- Producer: Chris Williamson

Leeway chronology
| Born to Expire (1989) | Desperate Measures (1991) |

Professional ratings
Review scores
| Source | Rating |
|---|---|
| AllMusic | 2.5/5 stars |
| Kerrang! | 5/5 stars |
| Metal Forces | 80/100 |

Born to Expire is the debut album by New York City band Leeway. It was recorded in November 1987. Delays postponed its release to January 1989 – jointly on Rock Hotel and Profile Records. It was followed up by Desperate Measures in 1991. In 1996, Another Planet re-issued the album on the same CD as Desperate Measures.

In 2021 Revolver dubbed the record one of the top 10 essential New York hardcore albums of all time. Stating "Born to Expire captures the fleeting moment in NYHC history when metal and punk were still flirting with one another in a way that felt fresh, unpredictable and singular."

== Overview ==
Lyrically and vocally, Leeway were firmly rooted in the hardcore punk genre as could also be seen by the company they chose to keep – Corrosion of Conformity, Bad Brains, Circle Jerks, Sick of It All and Prong to name a few. Musically, however, it was most definitely metal and a compromise label of thrash/crossover was achieved but still left a few questions unanswered. In truth, many fans of both genres had their likes and dislikes – even between songs.

Guitarist/songwriter A.J. Novello had this to say on the dichotomy caused by this album:

[the album] came out and surprised everyone because it was totally metallic sounding... [it] re-wrote the book on New York hardcore. Leeway just about killed [the] "hardcore" sound because we used heavy guitar sounds and spent time on actual tones and textures instead of throwing things together haphazardly."

Most of the songs are played at thrash metal pace but at hardcore punk-style track lengths. The band even had time to experiment with rap and funk on "Catholic High School".

Guitarist Michael Gibbons spoke about the album's signature guitar sound:

You really can't beat a Marshall JCM800 for a guitar amplifier. It's just that simple and truthful. We experimented with lots of tones, re-positioning the cabinets, mic placements, etc. Having Tom Soares as the album's engineer, him knowing his studio so well, was also a huge help. In terms of the guitars, I used a Gibson Les Paul Custom with a Seymour Duncan custom pickup, and A.J. used his Gibson SG.

== Track listing ==
All tracks are written by Eddie Sutton and A.J. Novello, except where noted.

| No. | Title | Length |
|---|---|---|
| 1. | "Rise and Fall" (Sutton, Novello, Ackerman) | 3:54 |
| 2. | "Mark of the Squealer" | 3:40 |
| 3. | "Be Loud" | 2:18 |
| 4. | "On the Outside" | 3:25 |
| 5. | "Defy You" | 3:09 |
| 6. | "Enforcer" | 3:48 |
| 7. | "Tools for War" | 3:08 |
| 8. | "Born to Expire" | 4:07 |
| 9. | "Marathon" | 2:14 |
| 10. | "Self Defense" | 1:25 |
| 11. | "Catholic High School (Girls in Trouble)" | 2:01 |
| 12. | "Unexpected" | 4:35 |

== Credits ==
- Eddie Sutton – vocals
- A.J. Novello – guitar
- Michael Gibbons – guitar
- Zowie – bass
- Tony Fontão – drums
- Recorded in November 1987 at Normandy Sound, Warren, Rhode Island
- Produced by Chris Williamson
- Engineered by Tom Soares
- Assistant engineered by Jamie Locke
- Assistant engineered by Marc Siegel
- Cover art by Bevin Stone
- Mastered by Howie Weinberg at Masterdisk, New York City
- Reissue remastered by Alan Douches at West Westside Music
