= It's Tee Time =

Studio album by Sweet Tee
- Released: 1988
- Recorded: 1986–88
- Studios: Bayside Sound (Bayside, New York); Power Play (New York, New York)
- Genre: Hip hop
- Length: 37:59
- Label: Profile
- Producers: Hurby Luv Bug; Sweet Tee; the Invincibles

Singles from It's Tee Time
- 1. "It's My Beat" Released: 1986; 2. "It's Like That Y'All / I Got Da Feelin'" Released: 1987; 3. "On The Smooth Tip" Released: 1988; 4. "Let's Dance" Released: 1989

Professional ratings
Review scores
Source	Rating
AllMusic	4/5 stars

It's Tee Time is the only studio album by American rapper Sweet Tee. It was released in 1988 on Profile Records. The recording sessions took place at Bayside Sound Recording Studio Inc. and at Power Play Studios in New York. The album was produced by Hurby Luv Bug, the Invincibles, and Sweet Tee. It features a guest appearance from DJ Jazzy Joyce. The album peaked at number 169 on the US Billboard 200. It spawned five singles: "It's My Beat", "It's Like That Y'All" b/w "I Got Da Feelin'", "On the Smooth Tip" and "Let's Dance".

== Track listing ==
All tracks are written by Toi Jackson and Hurby Azor.

No.	Title	Producer(s)	Length
1.	"On the Smooth Tip"	Hurby Luv Bug; The Invincibles	4:06
2.	"Let's Dance"	Hurby Luv Bug; The Invincibles	3:48
3.	"I Got da Feelin'"	Hurby Luv Bug; The Invincibles	4:12
4.	"Show and Prove"	Hurby Luv Bug; The Invincibles	3:03
5.	"Work Out"	Hurby Luv Bug; The Invincibles	4:07
6.	"It's My Beat" (featuring Jazzy Joyce)	Hurby Luv Bug; The Invincibles	5:02
7.	"As the Beat Goes On"	Hurby Luv Bug; The Invincibles	3:33
8.	"It's Like That Y'all"	Hurby Luv Bug; The Invincibles	4:59
9.	"Why Did It Have to Be Me"	Hurby Luv Bug; Sweet Tee	5:09
Total length:			37:59

== Personnel ==
- Toi "Sweet Tee" Jackson – main artist, songwriter, producer (track 9)
- Joyce "DJ Jazzy Joyce" Spencer – featured artist (track 6)
- Karen Anderson – backing vocals (track 5)
- Lenora Helmm – backing vocals (track 5)
- Jimmy Young – backing vocals (track 5)
- Charis'se Rose – backing vocals (track 9)
- John Ficarrotta – lead guitar, bass
- Peter Puleo – synthesizer
- Hurby "Luv Bug" Azor – songwriter, producer, mixing (track 6)
- Andre DeBourg – recording (tracks: 1–5, 7–9), mixing
- Patrick Adams – recording (track 6)
- Howie Weinberg – mastering
- Janet Perr – art direction, design
- Caroline Greyshock – photography

== Charts ==
Chart (1989)	Peak position
US Billboard 200	169
US Top R&B/Hip-Hop Albums (Billboard)	31
