= Desperate Measures (Leeway album) =

Studio album by Leeway
- Released: June 3, 1991
- Recorded: April 1990
- Studio: Normandy Sound, Warren, Rhode Island
- Genre: Crossover thrash
- Length: 42:02
- Label: Profile Records/Rock Hotel
- Producer: Chris Williamson

Leeway chronology
Born to Expire (1989)	Desperate Measures (1991)	Adult Crash (1994)

Professional ratings
Review scores
Source	Rating
AllMusic	3/5 stars

Desperate Measures is the second album by American crossover thrash band Leeway. It was released in June 1991 on Rock Hotel/Profile Records. It features two lineup changes from the previous album: Jimmy Xanthos and Pokey replace Zowie and Tony Fontão on bass and drums respectively.

== Overview ==
While the previous album, Born to Expire, showed a clear hardcore influence, the sound on Desperate Measures is of thrash metal akin to Anthrax or Testament. However, like its predecessor, it had fans in both metal and hardcore camps.

Guitarist/songwriter A.J. Novello had this to say on the album:

...it wasn't exactly what I had in mind. (It) was a little too metallic. Eddie's vocals were drenched in effects (Suttons' critical comparison to Ozzy began here), the songs were more left-field, and we initially disappointed some fans.

In contrast to Novello, guitarist Michael Gibbons perceives the album in a more positive manner:

I still love Desperate Measures. Eddie's vocals were mixed too heavily, I agree. But, as a metalhead from Queens first, before I was even a hardcore fan, I've always loved that recording. A lot of hardcore fans also loved it, as well as some prominent people from the NYHC scene who have admitted that to me through the years.

Unlike the previous album, Desperate Measures shows a more rhythm and groove yet melodic-oriented sound with more variety, such as songs like "Kingpin" incorporating elements of a rap metal/rapcore, while "2 Minute Warning" had more of a hip-hop/rap and funk influence.

== Track listing ==
1. "Make Me an Offer" (Eddie Sutton, A.J. Novello, Michael Gibbons) – 5:49
2. "All About Dope" (Sutton, Novello, H Ackerman) – 4:27
3. "Soft Way Out" (Sutton, Novello) – 3:29
4. "Stand For" (Sutton, Novello) – 3:41
5. "No Heroes" (Sutton, Novello) – 3:46
6. "Kingpin" (Sutton, Novello, Gibbons) – 3:53
7. "Who's to Blame" (Sutton, Gibbons) – 4:06
8. "Ball Hugger" (Sutton, Gibbons) – 3:23
9. "2 Minute Warning" (Sutton) – 2:01
10. "The Future (Ain't What It Used to Be)" (Sutton, Novello, Gibbons) – 7:27

== Personnel ==
- Eddie Sutton – vocals
- A.J. Novello – guitar
- Michael Gibbons – guitar
- Jimmy Xanthos – bass
- Pokey – drums
- Recorded in April 1990 at Normandy Sound, Warren, Rhode Island
- Produced by Chris Williamson
- Mastered by Howie Weinberg at Masterdisk, New York City
- Reissue remastered by Alan Douches at West Westside Music
