= Christmas Rap =

Compilation album by Various artists
- Released: 1987
- Recorded: 1987
- Genres: Hip-hop; Christmas music
- Length: 38:38
- Label: Profile
- Producer: Various

Christmas Rap is a compilation album of Christmas-themed hip-hop songs primarily released in 1987 by Profile Records in US with international versions distributed through London Records in the UK and Netherlands.

The album features tracks from prominent and emerging artists in the early hip-hop scene, blending festive holiday themes with the raw production styles of the era. It is considered one of the earliest full-length compilations dedicated to holiday rap music and helped popularize the genre during the golden age of hip-hop.

== Background ==
In the mid-1980s, hip-hop was rapidly evolving from its underground roots in the Bronx to mainstream success, with labels like Profile Records playing a key role in promoting New York-based talent. Profile, home to acts such as Run-D.M.C., sought to capitalize on the success of Run-D.M.C.'s "Christmas in Hollis", which had been issued as a single earlier that year.

This track became a holiday staple and a cornerstone of the compilation, marking one of the first instances of major hip hop artists engaging with Christmas themes. The album reflects the socio-economic realities of 1987, with underlying tones of street life and resilience distinguishing it from traditional Christmas albums. Profile Records assembled contributions from their roster and affiliated producers like Hurby "Luv Bug" Azor.

== Critical reception ==
Professional ratings
Review scores
Source	Rating
AllMusic	3/5 stars
RapReviews	4/10

In a retrospective review AllMusic Stephen Thomas Erlewine wrote: "For all of its street cred, hip-hop has been surprisingly fond of novelty songs, and nothing provides better source material for novelties than the holidays. And there's nothing but novelties on Christmas Rap, a budget-priced collection of holiday hip-hop tunes."

In 2003, RapReviews Steve 'Flash' Juon gave the album a rating of 4 out of 10, describing it as having the right concept but largely consisting of "lame and obscure" content. He praised standout tracks like Run-D.M.C.'s "Christmas in Hollis" as a generational holiday anthem and King Sun's "Christmas in the City" for its honest portrayal of urban poverty, but criticized others, such as Sweet Tee's "Let the Jingle Bells Rock" and The Showboys' "That's What I Want for Christmas," as corny or forgettable. Juon noted the album's attempt to blend festive cheer with hip-hop's raw edge during economic hardships but suggested it was best enjoyed selectively.

In a 2022 list by Complex of the 25 best Christmas rap songs of all time, Sweet Tee's "Let the Jingle Bells Rock" was ranked at number 4, praised for its sweetness and oxymoronic blend of emphatic tone with holiday joy, while Run-D.M.C.'s "Christmas in Hollis" was ranked at number 5, highlighted as hip-hop's single greatest Christmas song with its neighborhood storytelling and cultural impact.

== Sampling ==
Trent Reznor used samples from Sweet Tee's "Let the Jingle Bells Rock" and Surf M.C.'s "A Surf M.C. New Year" in the song "Kinda I Want To", a track on the Nine Inch Nails' debut album Pretty Hate Machine.

== Track listing ==
All tracks are produced by various artists, as noted. Total length: 38:38.

Side one
No.	Title	Artist	Length
1.	"Christmas in Hollis"	Run-D.M.C.	2:57
2.	"Let the Jingle Bells Rock"	Sweet Tee	3:57
3.	"Dana Dane Is Coming to Town"	Dana Dane	3:44
4.	"Ghetto Santa"	Spyder-D	3:36
5.	"Christmas in the City"	King Sun, D. Moët	5:17

Side two
No.	Title	Artist	Length
1.	"Chillin' with Santa"	Derek B	4:54
2.	"He's Santa Claus"	Disco Four	3:27
3.	"That's What I Want for Christmas"	The Showboys	5:58
4.	"A Surf M.C. New Year"	Surf M.C.'s	4:36

== Personnel ==
- Art direction and design – Janet Perr
- Mastering engineer – Howie Weinberg
- Photography – Robert Lewis

=== Producers ===
- Run-D.M.C., Rick Rubin, Steve Ett ("Christmas in Hollis")
- Hurby "Luv Bug" Azor ("Let the Jingle Bells Rock", "Dana Dane Is Coming to Town")
- Spyder-D, DJ Doc ("Ghetto Santa")
- Sun-Born, Troy Patterson ("Christmas in the City")
- Derek Boland ("Chillin' with Santa")
- Greg Marius ("He's Santa Claus")
- Cliff Hall, The Showboys ("That's What I Want for Christmas")
