= The Cucumbers (album) =

Studio album by the Cucumbers
- Released: 1987
- Studio: The Firehouse, London
- Genre: Guitar pop
- Label: Profile
- Producer: David Young

The Cucumbers chronology
All Shook Up (1986)	The Cucumbers (1987)	Where We Sleep Tonight (1994)

The Cucumbers is an album by the American band the Cucumbers, released in 1987. It was a success on college radio stations. The band supported the album with a North American tour.

== Production ==
Recorded in London with a budget of $15,000, the album was produced by David Young. The singers and guitarists Deena Shoshkes and Jon Fried, who wrote the songs, were backed by John Williams on bass and Yuergen Renner on drums. The band enjoyed being away from the cutthroat New York City recording environment. Many of the songs are about relationships, the daily experience of living with a domestic partner, obstacles in life, and learning how to adjust to disappointment. Profile Records asked the Cucumbers to rerecord "My Boyfriend", which had appeared on their first EP. "My Town" is about the demographic and commercial transformation of Hoboken. "Don't Drop the Baby" was written after Fried became an uncle.

== Critical reception ==
Professional ratings
Review scores
Source	Rating
AllMusic	3.5/5 stars
The Boston Phoenix	3.5/4 stars
Robert Christgau	A−
The Philadelphia Inquirer	4/4 stars
The Record	2.5/4 stars
Rolling Stone	3/5 stars

The New York Times said, "Like the early Talking Heads and the B-52's, the Cucumbers put some twists into late-1960's pop, funk and bubble gum. Springy guitar lines ... and a terse backbeat carry the songs, as the easy harmonies of the 1960's are crimped and stripped back to the point of dissonance." The Washington Post noted that "the Cucumbers have an assured pop-ensemble sound and Deena Shoskes' sweetly idiosyncratic lyrics are engaging even when the melodies that frame them are not." The Philadelphia Inquirer stated that the band "makes verbally witty, melodically pretty music that never becomes treacly or sentimental." Trouser Press opined that "fancier production reduces the group's amateurish appeal and obscures its quirky personality; smoothed out and spruced up, the entirely presentable songs blur together." The Baltimore Sun concluded that when the band "strives for the mainstream perkiness of, say, Talking Heads 77, it becomes beset by a terminal case of the cutes".

== Track listing ==
No.	Title	Length
1.	"My Boyfriend"
2.	"Work Together"
3.	"Tiger"
4.	"I'll Do Anything"
5.	"Shower"
6.	"Don't Drop the Baby"
7.	"My Town"
8.	"Birds"
9.	"One Step Further"
10.	"Just Don't Tell Me What to Do"
