= It's My Beat =

1987 single by Sweet Tee and DJ Jazzy Joyce

- Side A of the US 12-inch vinyl

Single by Sweet Tee and DJ Jazzy Joyce

from the album It's Tee Time
- B-side: "It's My Beat (Instrumental)"
- Released: 1986
- Studio: Power Play Studios (Long Island City, NY)
- Genre: Hip hop
- Length: 4:58
- Label: Profile (US); Champion (UK)
- Songwriter(s): Toi Jackson; Hurby Azor
- Producer(s): Hurby Luv Bug and the Invincibles

Sweet Tee singles chronology
| "It's My Beat" (1986) | "I Got Da Feelin'" (1987) |

DJ Jazzy Joyce singles chronology
| "It's My Beat" (1986) | "Lovely Thing" (1990) |

"It's My Beat" is the debut single by American rapper Sweet Tee and DJ Jazzy Joyce, released in 1986 via Profile Records. In 1988, it was included in Sweet Tee's debut album It's Tee Time. Produced by Hurby "Luv Bug" Azor, who also has writing credits for the song alongside Sweet Tee, the single was later released in the UK through Champion Records.

In February 1987, "It's My Beat" had an entry at No. 98 on the UK Singles Chart. In the end of year-roundups, the song placed at No. 19 in The Face list of best singles of 1987.

In 1999, Ego Trip's editors ranked "It's My Beat" at No. 20 in their list of Hip Hop's 40 Greatest Singles by Year 1986 in Ego Trip's Book of Rap Lists.

== Single track listing ==
=== 7" Vinyl ===
==== A-Side ====
1. "It's My Beat" (4:58)

==== B-Side ====
1. "It's My Beat" (Instrumental) (5:04)

=== 12" Vinyl ===
==== A-Side ====
1. "It's My Beat" (4:58)

==== B-Side ====
1. "It's My Beat" (Instrumental) (5:04)
2. "It's My Beat" (A Cappella) (1:52)

== Personnel ==
Credits are taken from the liner notes and the official page of the ASCAP.

- Written By – Toi Jackson, Hurby Azor
- Producer – Hurby Luv Bug and the Invincibles
- Mixed By – Hurby Luv Bug
- Mastered By – Howie Weinberg
- Recorded By – Patrick Adams
- Phonographic Copyright ℗ – Profile Records, Inc.
- Manufactured By – Profile Records, Inc.
- Distributed By – Profile Records, Inc.
- Published By – Protoons, Inc.
- Published By – Turn Out Brothers Publishing
- Engineered At – Power Play Studios
- Mixed At – Bayside Recordings
- Mastered At – Masterdisk
