= Live in a World Full of Hate =

Live album by Sick of It All
- Released: 1993
- Recorded: September 1993
- Venue: New Jersey
- Genre: Hardcore punk
- Length: 47:48
- Label: Lost And Found Records

Sick of It All chronology
Just Look Around (1991)	Live in a World Full of Hate (1993)	Scratch the Surface (1994)

Live in a World Full of Hate is a live album by Sick of It All, released in 1993.

== Track listing ==
1. Injustice System – 2:33
2. It's Clobberin' Time – 0:47
3. Violent Generation – 1:45
4. Alone – 1:57
5. The Pain Strikes – 3:11
6. Shut Me Out – 2:25
7. Pushed Too Far – 0:55
8. Friends Like You – 1:20
9. Locomotive – 2:50
10. World Full Of Hate – 2:25
11. Just Look Around – 2:48
12. What's Going On – 2:07
13. Give Respect – 1:24
14. Disillusion – 2:08
15. No Labels – 0:55
16. Pete's Sake – 0:49
17. G.I. Joe Head Stomp – 1:22
18. We Want The Truth – 2:32
19. The Blood & The Sweat – 1:42
20. The Shield – 2:44
21. We Stand Alone – 2:40
22. Indust – 2:36
23. My Life – 0:49
24. Betray – 2:52
