= Jayceeoh =

American DJ & record producer (born 1982)

- Also known as: Trappy Gilmore
- Born: Jake Osher; June 6, 1982 (age 44)
- Origin: Los Angeles, California, U.S.
- Genres: Trap; electro; dubstep; hip-hop; glitch hop; drum and bass
- Occupations: Producer; DJ
- Years active: 1997–present
- Labels: Super 7 Records; Buygore Records; Disciple Round Table
- Member of: 1000volts
- Website: Jayceeoh.com

Jacob Charles Osher, better known as Jayceeoh (born June 6, 1982), is an American DJ, record producer and Turntablist. He is the founder of the record label Super 7 Records.

== Early years ==
Jayceeoh spent his high school years at the Taylor Allderdice High School in Pittsburgh, Pennsylvania. Allderdice alumni include Wiz Khalifa, Mac Miller and the founders of their label, Rostrum Records. Throughout Wiz Khalifa's ascent to hip-hop's elite, Jayceeoh held down Wiz and the Taylor Gang with mixtape features as well as being his special occasion tour DJ. Jayceeoh then went on to spend his college years studying music and production at Emerson College in Boston.

In January 2011, Jayceeoh won first place at the National McDonald's Flavor Battle Finals. In December 2011, Jayceeoh was recruited by Sony/RCA recording artist Sammy Adams to be his tour DJ for his major label debut. Soon after meeting with Adams, Jayceeoh toured clubs and arenas with him alongside pop artists. They have also made national TV performances on Conan O'Brien and 90210.

== Biography (2013–present) ==
Jayceeoh released his first original track "DAMN" in collaboration with DJ Scene on Fools Gold Records in November 2013. Earlier that year, he earned the title of champion of VH1's "Master of the Mix" TV show, securing a prize that included $250,000 and a one-year contract to serve as the official DJ for Smirnoff Vodka. Jayceeoh shifted his focus entirely to producing music, contributing to various labels such as Atlantic Records, Dim Mak Records, Buygore Records, Ultra Records, Fool's Gold Records, and his very own Super 7 Records, amongst others.

Jayceeoh is a brand ambassador for SOL Republic Headphones and was the face and voice of the Smirnoff x Spotify campaign in 2014. His music has been featured at events sponsored by a range of brands in sports, entertainment, and fashion alike, including, but not limited to: X-Games, Myspace, OK! Magazine, Burton, Nike, Red Bull, McDonald's, Adidas, Oakley, Comedy Central, Warner Bros. Records, and Playboy. He has been spotlighted in multiple magazines, periodicals, and websites including, but not limited to: OK! Magazine, The Source, Complex Magazine, Vibe, MTV.com, Examiner, VH1.com, The New Yorker, New York Press, Village Voice, New York Post, Perezhilton.com, URB, Remix, Tablist and Boston Globe.

In the club circuit and live performance realm, Jayceeoh has maintained premier residencies across the country in notable North American venues. He has also played in over 32 countries worldwide and on popular festival stages, including iHeartRadio Festival in Las Vegas, TomorrowWorld Festival in Atlanta, EDC in Mexico City, Firefly Festival in Dover, and Lights All Night festival in Dallas. Prior to 2013, Jayceeoh was the official tour DJ for Sammy Adams and Wiz Khalifa, and has performed alongside and worked with the likes of Bassnectar, Borgore, Terravita, The Bloody Beetroots, A-Trak, Redman, Morgan Page, Baauer, Sidney Samson, and others.

He is also the creator of the Super 7 series of mixtapes. Some of the past guest DJs include Nghtmre, TJR, TWRK, Jazzy Jeff, Gaslamp Killer, Z-Trip, Party Favor, Tropkillaz, Lookas, Grandtheft, and more.

== Discography ==
=== Singles and official remixes ===
- Jayceeoh and Steve 1der - Till a Boy Get Kill (2013) (Independent Release)
- Jayceeoh and DJ Scene - Ddamn (Original Mix) (2013) (Fools Gold Records)
- Jayceeoh and Caked Up - King S#!t (2014) (Independent Release)
- Jayceeoh and Made Monster - Go Harder 2.0 (2014) (Buygore Records)
- Jayceeoh and Woogie - 2thawall (2014) (Buygore Records)
- Alison Wonderland - Run (Jayceeoh Remix) (2015) (Warner Music Group Australia)
- Morgan Page - Running Wild (Jayceeoh Remix) (2015) (Nettwerk Records)
- Jayceeoh and Riot Ten - Hold It Down (2015) (Super 7 Records)
- Jayceeoh, B-Sides and Fawks - Jit Going Ham (2015) (Buygore Records)
- Sbcr and Jayceeoh - Frankenstein (2015) (Dim Mak Records)
- Jayceeoh - Turn Me Up Some (featuring Redman and Jay Psar) (2015) (Super 7 Records)
- Jayceeoh and Woogie - Rap Don't Work (featuring OJ Da Juiceman) (2016) (Elysian Records)
- Swanky Tunes - At The End Of The Night (Jayceeoh Remix) (2016) (Armada Music)
- Martin Solveig - +1 (Jayceeoh Remix) (2016) (Big Beat Records)
- The Knocks - I Wish (Jayceeoh Remix) (2016) (Atlantic Records)
- Jayceeoh - Elevate (featuring Nevve) (2016) (Trap Nation)
- Jayceeoh and Styles & Complete - Levitate (2019) (Circus Records)
- Jayceeoh and Dialedin featuring Med - 187 (2019) (Circus Records)
- Jayceeoh and The Bloody Beetroots - Grand Slam / Exodus (2019) (Slugz Music)
- Jayceeoh and Throwdown - Hallelujah (2019) (Disciple Round Table)
- Henry Fong featuring General Degree - What's the Move (Jayceeoh Remix) (2020) (Dim Mak Records)
- Jayceeoh featuring LeRome Swiss - Powerful Dream (2021) (Deadbeats)
- Jayceeoh - Bubble Up (2021) (Deadbeats)

=== Mixtapes and guest mixes ===
- Jayceeoh - Super 7 Volume 1 (2010) (Mixtape)
- Jayceeoh - Super 7 Volume 2 (2010) (Mixtape)
- Jayceeoh Presents "Avant-Gucci" (2010) (Mixtape)
- Jayceeoh - Super 7 Volume 3 (2010) (Mixtape)
- Jayceeoh - Super 7 Volume 4 (2011) (Mixtape)
- Jayceeoh - Super 7 Volume 5 (2012) (Mixtape)
- Earmilk Presents: Jayceeoh - Pop Models Volume 6 (2013) (Mixtape)
- Jayceeoh - BBC Radio 1 Ignition Mix (2015) (Guest Mix for Annie Nightingale)
- Jayceeoh - Super 7 Volume 6 (2015) (Mixtape)
- Jayceeoh - BBC Radio 1 Quest Mix (2016) (Guest Mix for Annie Nightingale)
- Jayceeoh - Diplo & Friends Guest Mix (2017) (Guest Mix on BBC Radio 1)

Preceded by DJ P	Master of the Mix winner 2013	Succeeded by TBA
