= Surf MC's =

American hip hop group

- Origin: California, United States
- Genres: Hip hop
- Years active: 1987
- Labels: Profile

The Surf MC's were an American hip hop group from California. They were signed to Profile Records in 1987 and released their only album, Surf or Die, the same year. The album was a mix of rock, punk and hip hop and had one single, "Surf or Die," which peaked at number 90 on the US Billboard R&B chart. They performed with Red Hot Chili Peppers and Faith No More on The Uplift Mofo Party Tour.

== Discography ==
=== Albums ===
- Surf or Die (1987)

=== Singles ===
- "Surf or Die"
