= When the Smoke Clears (EP) =

EP by Sick of It All
- Released: November 4, 2016
- Recorded: February 2016
- Studios: Nova Studio, Staten Island, NY
- Genre: Hardcore punk
- Length: 11:24
- Label: Century Media
- Producer: The Jerry Farley

Sick of It All chronology
The Last Act of Defiance (2014)	When the Smoke Clears (2016)	Wake the Sleeping Dragon! (2018)

Professional ratings
Review scores
Source	Rating
Distorted Sound Magazine	8/10 stars
GBHBL	9/10 stars
Metal.de	8/10 stars
RAMzine	4/5 stars
TeamRock+	4/5 stars

When the Smoke Clears is an EP by the American hardcore punk band Sick of It All. It was released on 4 November 2016 by Century Media Records on both 10" vinyl and CD. Each album also includes a coffee table book. The album contains five new songs and contains rare photos and liner notes and from punk figures such as Davey Havok, Chuck Ragan and Matt Kelly. The album celebrates the 30 year anniversary of the band.

== Critical reception ==
When the Smoke Clears received positive reception Metal Hammer wrote "the sheer ferocity the band continue to wield ensures that this EP feels fresh, vital and relevant for every second of its 11-minute duration." Metal.de added "It is almost startling how reliably Sick of It All still delivers after all these years. But as mentioned at the start, anyone who has seen the band live knows that it comes naturally to them because they are fully committed to what they do. Every single gesture and every note is sincere you can hear it and that, combined with their friendly and unpretentious nature, is what makes Sick of It All a hardcore institution."

== Track listing ==
1. "When the Smoke Clears" – 1:56
2. "Black Venom" – 2:24
3. "Doomed Campaign" – 2:14
4. "Blood & Steel" – 2:11
5. "Fortress" – 2:39

== Performers ==
- Lou Koller – vocals
- Pete Koller – guitar
- Armand Majidi – drums
- Craig Setari – bass
