= The Cucumbers =

American power pop band

- Origin: Hoboken, New Jersey
- Genres: Power pop
- Years active: 1982–present
- Labels: Profile Records, Fake Doom Records
- Members: Jon Fried, Deena Shoshkes
- Past members: Yuergen Renner, John Williams, Kurt Wrobel, Nels Johnson, Tom Dugan, Charles Hargrove, EdNo, Steve Villano, Al Houghton
- Website: thecucumbers.net

The Cucumbers are an American power pop band from New Jersey, founded in Hoboken in the early 1980s by husband-and-wife duo Jon Fried and Deena Shoshkes.

== History ==
Fried and Shoshkes met in their freshman dorm at Brown University and first performed on campus, doing folk and jazz standards acoustically, two voices accompanied by Fried on guitar. They lived together and wrote songs together and, in the early 1980s, moved to Europe. Their first song, "My Boyfriend", became a hit on the college radio charts, leading to national tours, a couple of videos on MTV, and reviews in Rolling Stone and People. They have been the subject of profiles in the New York Times, specifically by Jon Pareles. In the early 1990s, Shoshkes and three other musicians—Alice Genese, David Cogswell, and Frank Giannini—formed Over the Moon, an alternative rock group making music aimed at children. They released one eponymous album and performed at rock clubs, churches, and other locations in Hoboken and New York City. According to Nj.com, "...with a second child on the way, lead singer Deena Shoshkes and guitarist Jon Fried moved from their musical roots of Hoboken to Millburn. A suburban house gave them more room to raise their new family. Although the Cucumbers stepped out from the limelight of the Jersey scene they had been part for many years, they never stopped making music." They have received praise from music critic Robert Christgau.

== Discography ==
=== Albums ===
- Who Betrays Me...And Other Happier Songs (1985) - Fake Doom Records
- The Cucumbers (1987) - Profile Records
- Where We Sleep Tonight (1994) - Zero Hour Records
- Total Vegitility (1999) - Home Office Records
- All Things to You (2004) - Fictitious Records
- The Fake Doom Years (2016) - Life Force Records
- The Desk Drawer Tapes (2021) - Life Force Records
- Old Shoes (2023) - self-released
- As You Heard Me: Songs from the Novella "Hello George" (2026) - Life Force Records

=== Extended plays ===
- The Cucumbers (1983) - Fake Doom Records
- All Shook Up (1986) - Fake Doom Records
