= Adult Crash =

Studio album by Leeway
- Released: October 25, 1994
- Recorded: Late 1993/early 1994
- Studios: Normandy Sound and Nola Studios, Warren, Rhode Island
- Genre: Alternative metal • post-hardcore
- Length: 42:50
- Label: Bulletproof
- Producers: Phil Burnett, A.J. Novello

Leeway chronology
Desperate Measures (1991)	Adult Crash (1994)	Open Mouth Kiss (1995)

Adult Crash is the third album by New York City band Leeway. It was released in October 1994 on Bulletproof Records. The album is a departure from the band's earlier sound, moving into an alternative metal direction.

== Track listing ==
All songs written by A.J. Novello, Eddie Sutton, and Jimmy Xanthos, unless stated otherwise

1. "Simple Life?" – 4:14
2. "You" – 3:52
3. "Make a Move" – 3:37
4. "3 Wishes" (Novello, Sutton) – 4:33
5. "Withering Heights" – 5:27
6. "10 Years" – 5:11
7. "Silver Tongue" (Novello, Sutton) – 1:44
8. "Grip" – 2:57
9. "The Roulaison" (Novello, Xanthos) – 7:22
10. "Clueless" – 3:51

== Credits ==
- Eddie Sutton – vocals
- A.J. Novello – guitar
- Jimmy Xanthos – bass
- Pokey – drums
- Recorded at Normandy Sound and Nola Studios, Warren, Rhode Island
- Produced and engineered by Phil Burnett and A.J. Novello
- Additionally engineered by Tom Soares and Noah Evans
- Assistant engineered by Tony Gonzalez and Fred Bortolotti
- Mixed and mastered by Phil Burnett
