= Sweet Tee =

American rapper

- Also known as: Suga
- Born: Toi Crystal Jackson
- Origin: Queens, New York City, U.S.
- Genres: Hip hop
- Occupation: Rapper
- Years active: 1985–present
- Labels: Profile; JMJ
- Website: instagram.com/sweetteethemc/

Toi Crystal Jackson, known professionally as Sweet Tee, is an American rapper who was signed to Profile Records in the 1980s.

== Musical career ==
Her first single in 1986 was the hit "It's My Beat" featuring DJ Jazzy Joyce. Sweet Tee would be part of the crew of producer Hurby Azor’s "Idol Makers". She scored chart success with her debut album, It's Tee Time, in 1988, which peaked at No. 31 on the US Billboard R&B chart. She scored four chart hit singles from her debut album. These included "I Got da Feelin'" (No. 48 US R&B, No. 31 UK Singles Chart), "On the Smooth Tip" (No. 36 US R&B) and "Why Did It Have to Be Me". In the UK, "It's Like That Y'All" peaked in the Top 40. JMJ Records a subsidiary of Def Jam Recordings signed Sweet Tee and in 1995, Sweet Tee released the single "What's up, Star?" under the moniker Suga. The song appeared on Russell Simmons presents The Show: The Soundtrack. UK-based act Tin Tin Out's 1994 debut single, "The Feeling", was a piano-based house track that sampled Sweet Tee's lyrics from "I Got da Feelin'". The song reached No. 32 in the UK Singles Chart. It is credited to Tin Tin Out featuring Sweet Tee.

== Discography ==
=== Studio albums ===
List of albums, with selected chart positions
| Title | Album details | Peak chart positions | |
| Title | Album details | US | US R&B /HH |
|---|---|---|---|
| It's Tee Time | Released: 1988; Label: Profile; Formats: CD, LP, Cassette, digital download, streaming | 169 | 31 |

=== Compilation albums ===
List of compilation albums
| Title | Album details |
|---|---|
| Profile Singles | Released: March 5, 2021; Label: RCA; Formats: digital download, streaming |

=== Mixtapes ===
List of mixtapes, with year released
| Title | Mixtape details |
|---|---|
| Best of Both Worlds (hosted by Kid Capri) | Released: August, 2009; Label: MIKE29 Entertainment; Formats: Digital download |

=== As lead artist ===
List of singles, with selected chart positions, showing year released and album name
| Title | Year | Peak chart positions | | | | Album |
| Title | Year | US Dance | US R&B | US Rap | UK | Album |
|---|---|---|---|---|---|---|
| "It's My Beat" (with DJ Jazzy Joyce) | 1986 | — | — | * | 98 | It's Tee Time |
| "I Got Da Feelin'" | 1987 | — | 48 | * | 31 | It's Tee Time |
| "It's Like That Y'all" | 1987 | — | — | * | 31 | It's Tee Time |
| "On The Smooth Tip" | 1988 | — | 36 | 16 | — | It's Tee Time |
| "Let the Jingle Bells Rock" (Note: "Let the Jingle Bells Rock" was released as a split single with "Christmas in Hollis" by Run-D.M.C.) | 1988 | — | — | — | — | Christmas Rap |
| "Let's Dance" | 1989 | 27 | — | — | 79 | It's Tee Time |
| "What's Up Star?" (Note: Published as "Suga") | 1995 | — | 72 | 38 | — | The Show Soundtrack |
| "T.Y.T: Take You There" | 2017 | — | — | — | — | Non-album singles |
| "Breakin MC" (Note: Published as "Suga Sweet Tee") | 2017 | — | — | — | — | Non-album singles |
| "I Ain't Doin' Love" | 2020 | — | — | — | — | Non-album singles |
| "911" | 2020 | — | — | — | — | Non-album singles |
| "Don't Play Wit It" (featuring Pudgee Tha Phat Bastard) | 2021 | — | — | — | — | Non-album singles |
| "Hunger Games" | 2023 | — | — | — | — | Non-album singles |
| "In My Zone" | 2023 | — | — | — | — | Non-album singles |
| "Jewelry Box" | 2025 | — | — | — | — | Non-album singles |
"—" denotes a recording that did not chart or was not released in that territory.

=== Featured singles ===
List of singles, with selected chart positions
| Title | Year | Peak chart positions | | | | Album |
| Title | Year | US Rap | AUS | UK | UK Dance | Album |
|---|---|---|---|---|---|---|
| "Oh! Veronica" (as part of Glamour Girls) | 1986 | — | — | — | — | Non-album single |
| "This Is It Y'all" (Poizon Posse featuring Sweet Tee) | 1993 | 18 | — | — | — | Stompin' |
| "The Feeling" (Tin Tin Out featuring Sweet Tee) | 1994 | — | 225 | 32 | 3 | Always |
"—" denotes a recording that did not chart or was not released in that territory.

=== Guest appearances ===
List of non-single guest appearances, with other performing artists, showing year released and album name
| Title | Year | Other artist(s) | Album |
|---|---|---|---|
| "The DMX Will Rock (Rap Mix)" (uncredited) | 1985 | Davy DMX, Leonie J | The DMX Will Rock (single) |
| "I'm the Other Woman" | 1993 | Poizon Posse | Stompin' |
| "Who's Next?" | 1994 | Black Sheep | Non-Fiction |
| "And I Say" | 1996 | —N/a | Girls Town Soundtrack |
