= Master of the Mix =

American reality television series

- Created by: Karl Carter; Kembo Tom; David Tapscott
- Written by: Michael McQuarn; Kembo Tom; Alex Morgan
- Directed by: Michael McQuarn
- Presented by: Just Blaze; Amanda Seales
- Judges: Kid Capri; Amber Rose; Vikter Duplaix; Mia Moretti; Ben Maddahi
- Country of origin: United States
- No. of seasons: 3
- No. of episodes: 28

Production
- Executive producers: Karl Carter; Kembo Tom; Darius Evans; Ben Silverman; Eric Chin; David Tapscott; Tiffany Trigg
- Producer: Ben Silverman
- Running time: 30 minutes (2010–2012); 60 minutes (2013)
- Production companies: Electus; GTM; Viacom International

Original release
- Network: Centric (2010–2012); VH1 (2013)
- Release: November 3, 2010 – June 3, 2013

Master of the Mix is a reality television series and DJ competition. The 2010 season of the show had eight episodes and seven DJs. The show was hosted by Just Blaze and judged by Kid Capri. Biz Markie was a regular guest. The contestants were DJ Jazzy Joyce, Rich Medina, Vikter Duplaix, DJ Scratch, DJ Rap, DJ Revolution, and DJ Mars. The show aired half-hour episodes on Wednesday nights on the Centric television network with encore Saturday airings on BET. The show, which debuted on November 3, 2010, is presented by Smirnoff.

Ben Silverman announced in September 2010 that his production company, Electus, in partnership with branded entertainment agency GTM, would produce the show with financing from Diageo, parent of Smirnoff. The private screening premier on was held in New York City on November 2 and was attended by various luminaries in the Hip Hop music industry such as Grandmaster Flash.

The seven competitors have various wide-ranging experiences. Some have Grammy Award nomination; others have sold millions of albums; some have worked with some of the most popular current recording artists in the world. Among the DJs are the DJs of the Rock Steady Crew and EPMD. During the series the DJs compete in various challenges at venues across the world and most episodes will have eliminations. The surviving DJ who is chosen as "Master of the Mix" will win the sponsorship of Smirnoff as their official DJ at international Smirnoff-sponsored events for an entire year. The total value of the prize package, which includes custom-made Smirnoff bottle is $250,000.

== Season 1 (2010) ==
The season begins in Miami, Florida at a posh residence. Although there was a competition, 3 DJs were eliminated in the first episode. In the second week, DJ Dimepiece was eliminated in a challenge at a Las Vegas club where the DJ's competed without being able to see the audience.

=== Contestants ===
DJ	Status
DJ Scratch	Winner
Vikter Duplaix	Eliminated
Rich Medina	Eliminated
DJ Jazzy Joyce	Eliminated
DJ Rap	Eliminated
DJ Mars	Eliminated
DJ Revolution	Eliminated

=== Episodes ===
No. in season	Title	Original release date	Prod. code
1	"Crash Course"	November 3, 2010	101
The competition to name the top DJ kicks off in the premiere of this series hosted by Just Blaze and featuring Kid Capri as a judge.
2	"I Choose"	November 10, 2010	102
The DJs react to crowds without being able to see them.
3	"Crate Challenge"	November 17, 2010	103
The DJs add personal touches to their sets in Miami.
4	"Yacht Challenge"	November 24, 2010	104
The DJs perform on a yacht.
5	"Scratch Challenge"	December 1, 2010	105
The DJs have a scratch-off in New York City.
6	"Alternative Music Challenge"	December 8, 2010	106
The DJs perform for a different type of crowd than usual.
7	"Remix Challenge"	December 15, 2010	107
The DJs spin their own music.
8	"The Finale London: Hero vs. Hero Challenge"	December 22, 2010	108
Vikter Duplaix and DJ Scratch battle it out to determine who will be the champion. Winner, DJ Scratch.

== Season 2 (2011–2012) ==
The season begins with auditions in Los Angeles, California, Houston, Texas, Miami, Florida, Atlanta, Georgia, New York City, New York and Detroit, Michigan.

=== Contestants ===
DJ	Status
DJ P	Winner
DJ M-Squared	Eliminated
DJ Yonny	Eliminated
DJ K-Sly	Eliminated
Energizer Tha DJ	Eliminated
Jamieson Hill	Eliminated
DJ Mell Starr	Eliminated
DJ Total Eclipse	Eliminated
DJ Nicole Leone	Eliminated
DJ Wicked	Eliminated
DJ Supastar	Eliminated

=== Episodes ===
No. in season	Title	Original release date	Prod. code
1	"Auditions"	November 5, 2011	201
Season 2 kicks off with auditions to find the 10 best DJs.
2	"Fluffed"	November 12, 2011	202
In Season 2's inaugural test, some of the DJs display their talents on a rooftop in Hollywood.
3	"Whipped"	November 19, 2011	203
The DJ battle continues in Hollywood when the second contingent of contestants try to prove their talents.
4	"Blind"	November 26, 2011	204
The DJs spin their magic in North Carolina. On the flip side, one DJ is accused of possibly cheating.
5	"Go-Go"	December 3, 2011	205
The DJs face the music by competing in Washington, D.C., and performing with the go-go funk band Rare Essence.
6	"House"	December 10, 2011	206
The contestants breeze into Chicago and are tasked to spin at a house-music party for music figure Ron Trent. And a surprise twist awaits the DJs during elimination.
7	"Scratch"	December 17, 2011	207
A scratch challenge ensues in New York City, but one DJ seemingly sets out to avoid the test.
8	"Rock the Boat"	December 24, 2011	208
The DJs return to Los Angeles to rock the boat. They wage a spin-and-scratch battle on a boat, but rolling waves and a mighty wind make the challenge that much more difficult.
9	"Final Challenge"	January 7, 2012	209
The remaining DJs square off in the final challenge by showcasing their talents at the biggest bash of the season. Rapper Wiz Khalifa appears.
10	"Master Finale"	January 14, 2012	210
The winning DJ is named in the Season 2 finale, which features a reunion and a review of the season. The winner scores $250,000. Winner, DJ P.

== Season 3 (2013) ==
The season begins with final auditions at Club Frequency in Miami, Florida.

=== Contestants ===
DJ	Status
DJ Jayceeoh	Winner
DJ Incrediboi	Eliminated
Chris Karns	Eliminated
DJ Loczi	Eliminated
DJ Dynamix	Eliminated
DJ Fly Guy	Eliminated
Brian Dawe	Eliminated
DJ Tina T	Eliminated
DJ Dimepiece	Eliminated
DJ Royale	Eliminated
DJ B-Hen	Eliminated
DJ Hôhme	Eliminated
DJ Lisa Pittman	Eliminated
DJ Obscene	Eliminated
DJ PM	Eliminated
DJ Asha	Eliminated
DJ Excel	Eliminated
DJ Infa Red	Eliminated
DJ I-Dee	Eliminated

=== Episodes ===
No. in season	Title	Original release date	Prod. code
1	"Auditions"	April 1, 2013	301
It's day one of the competition and it's already surprise elimination day. The DJs arrive in Miami and are automatically told that they aren't all really finalists; they will have to compete today to receive a spot in the final 12. After they find out this shocking news, they are all taken to the bar back where they will wait until their name is called to go into the club and fight for a chance to stay in the competition.
2	"Shake It Up"	April 9, 2013	302
In the second episode, the DJs all get assigned three songs that they have to incorporate into their three-minute sets: a crowd favorite, a song that's rarely heard and a song that's difficult to work into a set. What happens when the judges deliberate and have to eliminate someone from the competition?
3	"Hip Hop"	April 16, 2013	303
The hip hop challenge divides the group: some of the DJs are excited to show off their hip hop knowledge while others simply hope to get through the day and slide by into the round. Fortunately for all the DJs guest judge Cut Chemist is on hand to share his hip hop expertise.
4	"Speak With Your Hands"	April 23, 2013	304
The DJs hit the workshop to prepare a set that shares the story of their life. The DJs share their family roots, life struggles and more in a rousing and moving day of competition.
5	"Ode to Miami"	April 30, 2013	305
Surprise guest judge DJ Irie arrives to take the DJs on a tour and journey around some of Miami's most cultural parts of town. DJ Irie wants the DJs to use what they learn on the tour as inspiration for their sets. Do the contestants take DJ Irie's tour and advice to heart?
6	"Half & Half"	May 7, 2013	306
This challenge has the DJs pairing up and sharing their turntable (and the spotlight) with another contestant. Dream teams are formed, surprise partnerships take off and others fizzle.
7	"Invent or Get Sent"	May 14, 2013	307
The DJs are thrown for a loop when they're pitted against each other in a particularly challenging and inventive set request. The judges stir things up even more when they make a surprising announcement about an eliminated contestant.
8	"Bend the Ten"	May 21, 2013	308
There are only five DJs left in the competition and things are really heating up. After some bonding with the judges and relieving the stress the DJs get back to work on the most grueling challenge yet.
9	"Remix"	May 28, 2013	309
It's down to the final 4. And not only are the stakes high, but anxiety levels are high and rising as well. The DJs begin their day at world famous Circle House Recording Studios where they are told about the "Remix" challenge. In this challenge, they will have to remix one of Grammy Award winning artist Estelle's songs.
10	"Master of Your Mix"	June 3, 2013	310
The final three DJs knuckle down and focus on their sets. All three DJs meet with directors of art, lighting and more as they prepare to put on a show for the crown of "Master of the Mix". Winner, DJ Jayceeoh.
