= XXV Nonstop =

Studio album by Sick of It All
- Released: November 1, 2011
- Genre: Hardcore punk
- Length: 37:54
- Label: Century Media

Sick of It All chronology
Based on a True Story (2010)	XXV Nonstop (2011)	The Last Act of Defiance (2014)

Professional ratings
Review scores
Source	Rating
AllMusic	3.5/5 stars
Punknews.org	3.5/5 stars

XXV Nonstop is the tenth album by American hardcore punk band Sick of It All and contains re-recorded classic songs and some new material. It was released on November 1, 2011 on Century Media Records.

== Track listing ==
No.	Title	Length
1.	"Clobberin' Time"	1:09
2.	"Injustice System!"	1:53
3.	"Sanctuary"	1:54
4.	"Scratch the Surface"	2:45
5.	"Us vs. Them"	3:32
6.	"The Deal"	1:16
7.	"Just Look Around"	2:26
8.	"Ratpack"	0:49
9.	"World Full of Hate"	2:13
10.	"Pushed Too Far"	0:58
11.	"GI Joe Headstomp"	1:29
12.	"Never Measure Up"	1:45
13.	"Chip Away"	2:04
14.	"Busted"	1:44
15.	"Locomotive"	2:23
16.	"My Life"	0:50
17.	"Friends Like You"	1:14
18.	"Relentless"	2:14
19.	"No Labels"	1:08
20.	"Built to Last"	2:08
21.	"Clobberin' Time (KRS-One Civilization Mix)"	2:00
