= DJ Mell Starr =

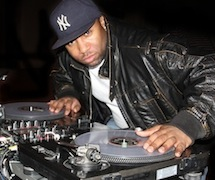

Background information
- Also known as: No Head Phones in Harlem
- Born: Leugene Jamel Simpson; January 13, 1975 (age 51); Brooklyn, New York City, United States
- Genres: House, hip hop, breakbeat
- Occupations: DJ, producer, remixer
- Instruments: Turntable; Drum machine Electronic keyboard Sequencer
- Years active: 1985–present
- Label: KD Records
- Website: www.djmellstarr.com

DJ Mell Starr (born Leugene Jamel Simpson, January 13, 1975) also known by his stage name "No Head Phones in Harlem" a.k.a. "The Most Dangerous", is an American DJ, turntablist, musician and producer born in Brooklyn, New York but raised in The Bronx, New York. He later moved to Harlem, New York where he now resides and is best known for his "No Head Phones in Harlem" appearance as a contestant on the second season of the DJ reality show Master of the Mix.

== Early life ==
Starr began practicing on a turntable at the age of nine, attempting a scratch technique on his family's old Technics SL-1200 turntable.

== Career ==
Starr first began in the DJ arena with family members and friends such as: Tony Humphries, Tedd Paterson, Dj Masia and Little Louie Vega. He switched venues to work with street DJs that included: Ron G, DJ Hollywood, DJ Chris Love, Kid Capri, DJ Chuck Chillout, Biz Markie and Q-Tip. Starr has also toured with artists such as: Usher, Ludacris, Busta Rhymes, Jay-Z, Pharrell, Wale, Mario, N.E.R.D, Jadakiss, Rihanna and Kanye West.

In September 2010, Starr created TheCutCafé.com music channel (an internet based channel via "UStream") where he DJ's live. "The Cut Café" was created for DJs to perform and display talents and skills to be viewed locally and internationally.

Starr flew to Iraq and Kuwait in the spring of 2009 in a C-130 aircraft and performed for 160,000 troops for two months. While visiting the country he had the opportunity to visit Saddam Hussein's home. After his return to the U.S., he traveled to 24 cities on Jay-Z's The Blueprint 3 concert tour to perform and DJ at after parties. He performed for Tiger Woods on the PGA tour and at a Barack Obama inauguration celebration organized by Tobey Maguire, Spike Lee and Kid Rock.

In November 2011, Starr was cast in the second season of the BET show Master of the Mix. In December 2011 Smirnoff, the brand and sponsor of Master of the Mix season 2 made Starr a spokesman for them as a result of his performance. Starr's scratching can be heard on Rasheed Chappell's single "Do Ur Thing" from the Future Before Nostalgia album, produced by Kenny "Dope" Gonzalez of Masters at Work.

In January 2012, Starr's cutting, scratching and mixing technique were recognized by Rock and Souls DJ School in NYC where he landed a DJ Instructors position to teach beginner, Intermediate and advanced classes.
