= Twin Hype =

American music group

- Origin: New Jersey, U.S.
- Genres: Hip-hop; hip house
- Years active: 1987–1992
- Label: Profile

Twin Hype was an American rap group, originating from New Jersey. Consisting of twin brothers Glennis Brown (the Sl) and Lennis Brown (Slick), born September 2, 1969 The twins were later joined by Jose Matos (DJ King Shameek) for their self-titled 1989 album and 1991 album Double Barrel.

== Career ==
The twins started rapping together at the age of 15 in high school contests. They were originally from South Carolina and moved up the east coast, first moving to Washington, D.C. and the suburbs in Maryland and Virginia, then eventually landing in New Jersey. They released two albums on Profile Records: Twin Hype (1989) and Double Barrel (1991). The single "Do It to the Crowd" was their first single release and the most successful. In rotation in alternative and college radio, it charted at number 69 on the UK Singles Chart and number 10 on the US Dance Chart. The second single "For Those Who Like to Groove" reached number 8 on the US Dance Chart. They released the hip house single "Nothin' Could Save Ya" in 1991.

Glennis Brown died in November 2025.

== Discography ==
=== Albums ===
Date	Title	US 200	US R&B
1989	Twin Hype	140	44
1991	Double Barrel	-	75

=== Singles ===
Date	Title	US Dance	US Rap	UK
1989	"For Those Who Like to Groove"	8	-	96
1989	"Do It to the Crowd"	10	19	65
1991	"Nothin' Could Save Ya"	-	-	-
