= Idol Makers =

- Origin: New York City, New York, U.S.
- Genres: Hip hop
- Years active: 1986–mid-1990s (approx.)
- Labels: Various
- Past members: Hurby Azor; Steevee-O Azor; Salt-N-Pepa; Kid 'n Play; Dana Dane; Sweet Tee; Kwamé; Antoinette; DJ Clark Kent; Joeski Love; Super Lovers

Idol Makers was a hip-hop collective and management group founded and led by producer Hurby "Luv Bug" Azor in the late 1980s.

The group consisted of several prominent artists from the golden age of hip-hop, including Salt-N-Pepa, Kid 'n Play, Dana Dane, Sweet Tee, Kwamé, Antoinette, DJ Clark Kent, Joeski Love, and Super Lovers.

Known for their lighthearted, fun, and innovative contributions to rap music, with a focus on stylish presentation, club culture, and storytelling, Idol Makers played a significant role in shaping the sound of hip-hop during the late 1980s and early 1990s.

== History ==
=== Formation ===
Idol Makers formed around 1986 when Hurby Azor began managing and producing hip-hop artists. Azor, born September 26, 1964, in Haiti, discovered Salt-N-Pepa at Sears and expanded to other artists. The production team included his brother Steve Azor, who suggested samples like "Impeach The President."The group originated in Queens, New York, where Azor and Kid 'n Play were in rival groups. Christopher "Play" Martin designed logos and clothing for members. Azor used go-go beats, DMX shakers, and breakbeats in productions. He faced rivalries with producers like Marley Marl.

=== Commercial success ===
In the late 1980s, members released albums: Salt-N-Pepa's Hot, Cool & Vicious (1986) with "Push It"; Kid 'n Play's 2 Hype (1988); Dana Dane's Dana Dane with Fame (1987); Sweet Tee's It's Tee Time (1988); Kwamé's Kwamé the Boy Genius: Featuring a New Beginning (1989); Antoinette on Hurby's Machine (1987). Joeski Love released "Rock Wit Joeski" and Super Lovers "Let The Drummer Get Ill." DJ Clark Kent worked as DJ and producer.Salt-N-Pepa's Very Necessary (1993) reached five-times platinum in the US (over five million copies) and sold seven million worldwide, with charts in Europe like the UK. Kid 'n Play's 2 Hype (1988) and Funhouse (1990) were gold-certified in the US. Dana Dane's debut was gold. The group had more certifications than many golden age crews.

=== Dissolution ===
Collaborations declined in the early 1990s. Very Necessary (1993) was Salt-N-Pepa's last with Azor, after disputes including his breakup with Cheryl James. By 1992 Kid N Play had left Idol Makers, so the group's last recordings on the House Party 3 soundtrack are also the only ones without Azor production. Dana Dane's Rollin' wit Dane (1995) excluded him. Later works by others omitted Azor. No official end, but joint projects stopped after 1993. Azor produced for Snow in 1995 before retreating from music.

== Legacy ==
Idol Makers predated hip-hop empires like Puff Daddy's. A 2015 compilation A Salute to Hurby Luv Bug featured group tracks. Azor creates scores, discovers talent, co-produced the Salt-N-Pepa biopic, and judges on Dogicel of Stars.

== Members ==
- Hurby "Luv Bug" Azor (founder, producer, manager)
- Steve Azor (producer)
- Salt-N-Pepa
- Kid 'n Play
- Dana Dane
- Sweet Tee
- Kwamé
- Antoinette
- DJ Clark Kent
- Joeski Love
- Super Lovers

== Legacy ==
Idol Makers is remembered as an early example of a hip-hop mogul's empire, predating figures like Puff Daddy.

Azor's production style influenced the fun, accessible side of rap, and the group's artists achieved commercial success with multiple platinum albums.

In 2015, a compilation titled A Salute to Hurby Luv Bug highlighted Azor's work with tracks from various Idol Makers artists.

Azor remains active in music, creating scores, discovering talent, co-producing the Salt-N-Pepa biopic, and judging on talent shows like Dogicel of Stars.
