= The Cucumbers (EP) =

EP by The Cucumbers
- Released: 1983
- Genre: Power pop, new wave
- Length: 10:35
- Label: Fake Doom Records
- Producer: Dave Young

The Cucumbers chronology
The Cucumbers (1983)	Who Betrays Me...And Other Happier Songs (1985)

Singles from The Cucumbers
- 1. "My Boyfriend"

The Cucumbers is the first release by the New Jersey new wave band the Cucumbers. It contains the single "My Boyfriend". It received a good deal of college radio play, enabling the band to begin playing out of town. In addition, "before the record was released, Tommy Dugan quit the band (gave no reason, just stopped returning calls…the band still wonders about that) and through the Village Voice (again) found drummer Yuergen Renner, born in Weil-am-Rhine, Germany, on the French-Swiss border, who came to New York in 1980 to play American rock. He was soon in six bands, but eventually left all but the Cukes."

== Track listing ==
1. Susie's Getting Married
2. Go Ahead and Do It
3. My Boyfriend
4. Snap Out of It

== Critical reception ==
Professional ratings
Review scores
Source	Rating
Robert Christgau	(A−)
Tom Hull – on the Web	A−

Robert Christgau wrote that the EP's first track, "My Boyfriend", "is a girl-group masterstroke for a feminist age."
