= Nemesis (rap crew) =

American Hip-Hop group

- Also known as: Something Fresh
- Origin: Dallas, Texas, U.S.
- Genres: Miami bass; gangsta rap
- Years active: 1987–present
- Labels: Get Off Me Records; Profile Records
- Members: DJ Snake, Big Al (Deceased), MC Azim, Ron C, Joe Macc
- Past members: Bhumble Bee; Eazy Roque; Casanova Rock, Suave D

Nemesis is an American hip-hop group formed in Dallas, Texas in the 1980s. Members of the group included MC Azim, DJ Snake, Big Al, Joe Macc and Ron C. They are considered the first rap group from Dallas to enjoy popularity in the US and world-wide, thanks to their label, Profile Records. Originally, Nemesis was called "Something Fresh" with group members including rappers MC Azim (a.k.a. Azim Rashid), Bhumble Bee (a.k.a. Bill Jackson) and Eazy Roque (a.k.a. Charles Roquemore). They were later joined by DJ Snake (a.k.a. Don Brown), Big Al (a.k.a. Al English), Casanova Rock (a.k.a. Sean Lett). The rappers from Hamilton Park and the DJs from Oak Cliff, both neighborhoods in Dallas, became part of the Dallas, Texas underground rap scene in the late 1980s and early 1990s. Known for their funk-structured compositions and loud bass lines, the group debuted with the single "Oak Cliff" in 1987, and followed up with several albums on Profile Records from 1989-1995.

== History ==
Something Fresh, a hip-hop group, gained local acclaim in Dallas by regularly appearing on KNON FM 90.9. Initially featured on "Nippy Jones Freaky Fresh Friday afternoon show," their collaboration with DJ Snake led to regular spots on the "All Hardy Def Party" radio show. Hosted by DJ Snake, Big Al and Casanova Rock, this show became a key platform for young hip-hop enthusiasts in Dallas, lacking alternative outlets for rap music. Every Wednesday night, the show highlighted local artists and underground music.

The group's rising popularity prompted a name change to Nemesis, influenced by member Bumble Bee's desire for a tougher image. DJ Snake, a pioneering hip-hop producer in Dallas, co-founded Get Off Me Records in 1987 and released his first single "Oak Cliff / Snake Beats". He began producing for Nemesis in 1988, contributing to their first album, "To Hell and Back", on Get Off Me Records. However, creative differences led to Bumble Bee's departure after signing with Profile Records, followed by Eazy Roque. MC Azim remained the sole MC, with Big Al stepping up as a producer/DJ and shifting the group's sound towards bass-heavy beats.

Azim left prior to the 1993 release of "Temple of Boom," with Ron C replacing him. DJ Snake departed in 1995, but the group continued, releasing "The People Want Bass." Their last known recording was in 2000, "Munchies for Your Bass, Da Return (Out tha Trunk)," featuring artists like Mabooda and Trill Gatez. The lead single "Hold Up" garnered regional attention. Big Al died in 2001 from natural causes.

Nemesis' style was influenced by gangsta rap, Miami bass, metal, and Islamic spirituality. Post-Nemesis, DJ Snake became a prominent figure in the Dallas-Fort Worth hip-hop scene, producing for various artists. He later collaborated with Too Short in Atlanta, contributing to acts like Lil Jon, T.I., and E-40. After a stint with DJ AK in the mid-90s, he continued to shape the local hip-hop landscape and released new music with Nemesis in 2016.

== Discography ==
- 1988 To Hell and Back (Get Off Me Records)
- 1989 To Hell and Back (Profile)
- 1991 Munchies for Your Bass (Profile) (Re-release in 1995)
- 1993 Temple of Boom (Profile)
- 1995 The People Want Bass (Profile) (Re-release in 1997)
- 2000 Munchies for Your Bass, Da Return (Out tha Trunk) (Mack Time Records)
- 2006 Greatest Hits (Mack Time Records)
- 2016 This Is Hip Hop (Get Off Me Records)
