= The Last Act of Defiance =

Studio album by Sick of It All
- Released: September 30, 2014
- Genre: Hardcore punk
- Length: 35:29
- Label: Century Media
- Producer: Tue Madsen

Sick of It All chronology
XXV Nonstop (2011)	The Last Act of Defiance (2014)	When the Smoke Clears (2016)

The Last Act of Defiance is the eleventh full-length album by American hardcore punk band Sick of It All. It was released on September 30, 2014, on Century Media Records.

== Background ==
The album was produced by the bands longtime friend Tue Madsen, they recorded the album at Nova Studio in Staten Island, New York and it was mixed at Madsen’s Antfarm Studio in Denmark.

The album cover was created by Ernie Parada.

The albums first single "Road Less Traveled" was released on August 11, 2014. A music video for the song was later released on October 29.

When asked in an interview about what he wants fans to walk away with after hearing Armand Majidi's stated: "I want them to feel that they just heard a hardcore record that has everything, from blistering speed to bouncing groove, to heavy and pounding to bright and melodic."

== Lyrical content ==
Much of the albums lyrical content focuses on assassinations of political figures, the band aging gracefully in the hardcore scene and touching upon issue of Constitutional rights in the United States.

The albums title serves as a double meaning lead singer Lou Koller stated "It could be the last act before you achieve victory, or it could be no matter how terrible the odds, were going to keep fighting."

== Reception ==
Professional ratings
Aggregate scores
Source	Rating
Metacritic	74/100
Review scores
Source	Rating
AllMusic	3.5/5 stars
Alternative Press Magazine	4/5 stars
Cryptic Rock	5/5 stars
Metal Hammer	3.5/5 stars
Punknews.org	4/5 stars
Sputnikmusic	3.7/5
Ultimate Guitar	7.5/10

The Last Act of Defiance received positive reviews from critics. On Metacritic, the album holds a score of 74/100 based on 5 reviews, indicating "generally favorable reviews".

Trey of Sputnikmusic wrote “It’s amazing to think that twenty-five years after their debut, Sick of it All could still play with such energy, aggression and conviction. It’s even more amazing they’ve managed to push those elements even further by trimming what little fat there was and filtering it through over two decades of experience. The Last Act of Defiance isn’t here to dazzle you with musicianship and diversity, it’s here to bludgeon in a way that only good hardcore can.”

Dawn of Cryptic Rock wore “ Sick Of It All always brings their best to the album. The Last Act of Defiance will get fans on their feet and moving from start to finish. Overall, one of their strongest albums in years.” Chris of Punknews.org wrote “Last Act Of Defiance is unapologetically a Sick Of It All record in the truest form.” Adding “SOIA appears to have come full-circle in encompassing their vast catalog of prior works.”

Gregory Heaney of AllMusic added "Where the band's last effort was rooted in their past, Last Act of Defiance has its feet firmly planted in the present with a message that feels both important and timely, making for a solid album that shows Sick of It All aren't just going through the motions."

== Track list ==
No.	Title	Length
1.	"Sound the Alarm"	1:47
2.	"2061"	2:19
3.	"Road Less Traveled"	2:29
4.	"Get Bronx"	2:12
5.	"Part of History"	1:41
6.	"Losing War"	2:25
7.	"Never Back Down"	2:06
8.	"Facing the Abyss"	2:24
9.	"Act Your Rage"	1:27
10.	"Disconnect Your Flesh"	2:30
11.	"Beltway Getaway"	1:58
12.	"Sidelined"	2:34
13.	"Outgunned"	2:07
14.	"DNC"	2:43
15.	"Stand Down"	2:16
16.	"With All Disrespect"	2:31

== Personnel ==
- Lou Koller – vocals
- Pete Koller – guitars
- Craig Setari – bass
- Armand Majidi – drums

Technical

- Tue Madsen — producer

== Charts ==
Chart (2014)	Peak
Belgium Flanders (Ultratop)	79
Belgium Wallonia (Ultratop)	148
France (SNEP)	179
Germany (GFK Entertainment)	92
Switzerland (Swiss Hitparade)	98
UK Rock and Metal (Official Charts)	35
US Heatseekers (Billboard)	17
