= Leeway (band) =

American crossover thrash band

Background information
- Also known as: The Unruled; Leeway NYC
- Origin: Astoria, New York City, U.S.
- Genres: Crossover thrash; thrash metal; hardcore punk
- Years active: 1984–1996; 2006
- Label: Profile Records
- Past members: Eddie Sutton; A.J. Novello; Michael Gibbons; Pokey Mo; Jimmy Xanthos; Gordon Ancis; Jose Ochoa; Eddie Cohen; Howie "Zowie" Ackerman; Saso Motroni; Mackie Jayson; Tony Fontao

Leeway was an American band formed as The Unruled in Astoria, Queens, New York in 1984 by guitarist A.J. Novello and vocalist Eddie Sutton. The band released four studio albums – Born to Expire (1989), Desperate Measures (1991), Adult Crash (1994) and Open Mouth Kiss (1995) – and broke up and reformed several times over the years. Despite lacking commercial success, Leeway is considered an integral part of the 1980s NYHC and crossover thrash scenes.

== History ==
Leeway was notable in the mid-to-late 1980s for playing alongside Crumbsuckers, Prong, Ludichrist, Bad Brains, and Sick of It All at the predominantly hardcore punk-oriented CBGB venue. They had metal influences from the start. Guitarist and songwriter A.J. Novello said of their career, "We might have helped open up a can of worms by bringing suburban metalheads to shows. Years later, it kind of ruined things in the scene, but I can't say I have any regrets."

Leeway signed to Profile Records, which released the band's first two albums, Born to Expire (1989) and Desperate Measures (1991); the band toured to support them. However, sharing the stage with NYHC peers and bands like Bad Brains, Exodus, Overkill, Suicidal Tendencies, Sepultura, Flotsam and Jetsam, Sacred Reich, Morbid Angel and Gwar, and their video for "Kingpin" getting airplay on MTV's Headbangers Ball, did not improve record sales or the band's popularity. By 1992, they left Profile, with guitarist Michael Gibbons recalling:

The label did no promotion. They also had no proper, accessible distribution of the album. Not to mention they didn't give us tour support and they had really low recording budgets. It was just a horrible record label, unless you were Run-DMC or Rob Base. It was a rap label that experimented with signing three hardcore bands (Cro-Mags, Murphy's Law and Leeway) and a metal band called Wargasm, then did nothing for any of us. So, how in the world were their artists supposed to generate income for the company, let alone themselves?

Following their split with Profile, Leeway released two more albums on Bulletproof Records – Adult Crash (1994) and Open Mouth Kiss (1995) – before disbanding in 1996. They briefly reunited in 2006 and played again, notably with Bad Brains at CBGB and a European Festival tour, which was the last time the band performed live. In 2016, Sutton reformed the band as Leeway NYC without any original members. They performed sporadically until the singer's death.

Their song "Enforcer" was featured on the playlist of radio show "L.C.H.C." in the game Grand Theft Auto IV in 2008.

Former guitarist Michael Gibbons died on December 27, 2023. Frontman Eddie Sutton died after suffering from lung cancer on April 19, 2024, at the age of 59.

== Members ==
- Eddie Sutton – lead vocals (1983–1996, 2006; died 2024)
- A.J. Novello – guitars (1983–1996, 2006)
- Jimmy Xanthos – bass (1989–1996, 2006)
- Pokey Mo – drums (1988–1996, 2006)
- Gordon Ancis – guitars (1986–1987)
- Michael Gibbons – guitars (1987–1992; died 2023)
- Jose Ochoa – bass (1983–1986)
- Eddie Cohen – bass (1988)
- Howie "Zowie" Ackerman – bass (1987–1988)
- Saso Motroni – drums (1983–1985)
- Mackie Jayson – drums (1985–1987)
- Tony Fontao – drums (1987–1988)

== Discography ==
Release date	Title	Label
1989	Born to Expire	Profile Records/Rock Hotel
1991	Desperate Measures	Profile Records/Rock Hotel
1994	Adult Crash	Bulletproof Records
1995	Open Mouth Kiss	Bulletproof Records
1996	Born to Expire/Desperate Measures	Another Planet – split reissue
