= Sick of It All =

American hardcore punk band

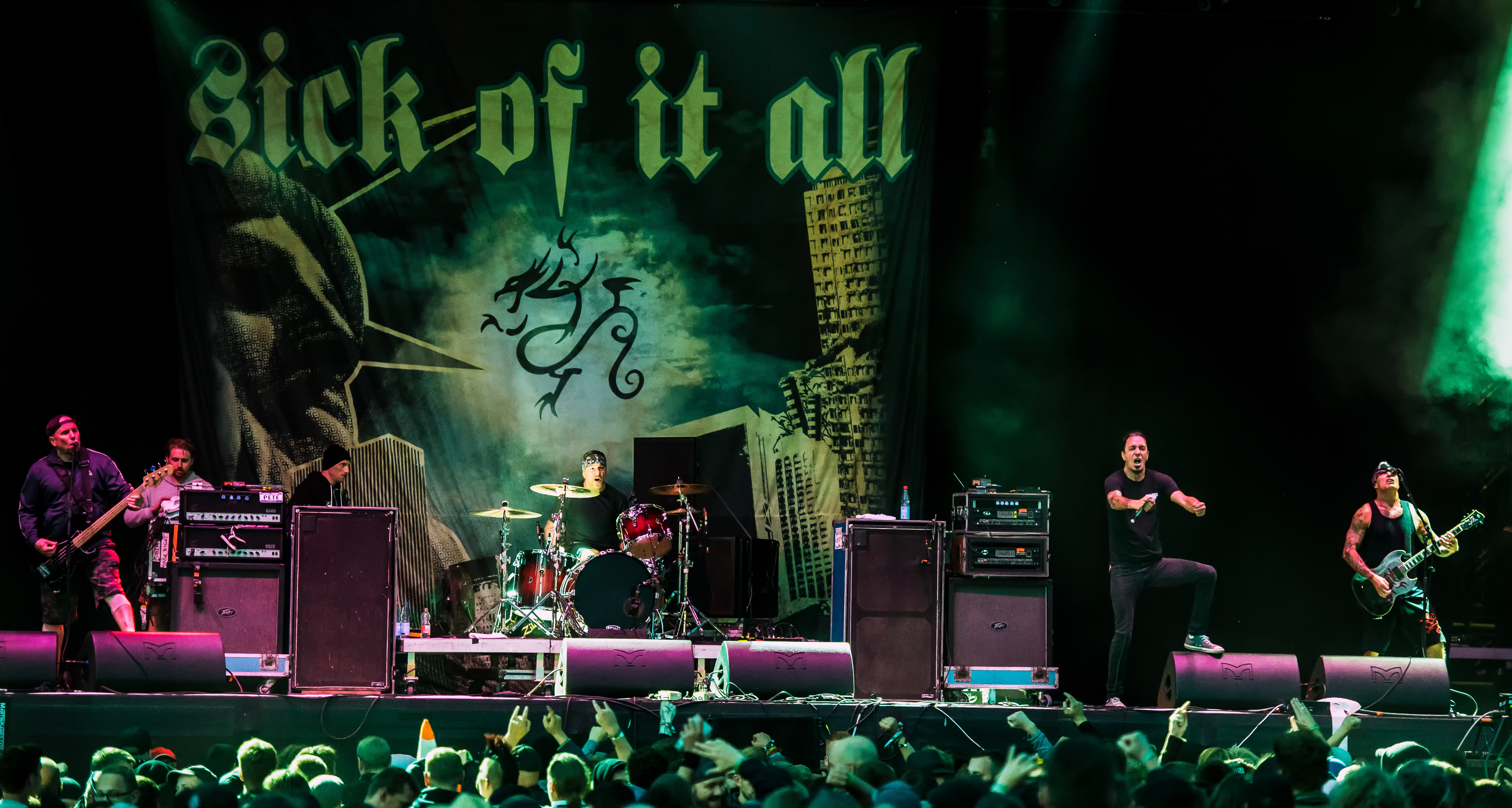
- Sick of It All at Reload Festival 2018

Background information
- Origin: New York City, U.S.
- Genres: Hardcore punk; tough guy hardcore
- Works: Discography
- Years active: 1986–present
- Labels: Revelation; In-Effect; Relativity; East West; Elektra; Equal Vision; Fat Wreck Chords; Abacus; Century Media
- Members: Pete Koller; Armand Majidi; Craig Setari
- Past members: Rich Cipriano; Max Capshaw; Eric Komst; Eddie Coen; Lou Koller
- Website: sickofitall.com

Sick of It All is an American hardcore punk band formed in 1986 in Queens, New York City by brothers Pete and Lou Koller. Their classic lineup, which had lasted for 33 years, included the Koller brothers (vocalist Lou and guitarist Pete), drummer Armand Majidi and bassist Craig Setari (who joined the band in 1993). As of Lou's death in 2026, Pete remains as the only consistent member of Sick of It All, although Majidi (who left in the band in 1989, but rejoined in 1991) is one of the three members to appear on every studio album.

Sick of It All is considered a major part of the New York hardcore scene, and by 2020, they had sold at least half a million records worldwide. Though their 1989 debut album Blood, Sweat, and No Tears was a moderate success, Sick of It All did not achieve commercial success until later albums. After the release of their second album Just Look Around in 1992, East West Records saw the band's potential and signed them in 1993. Sick of It All's third and major-label debut album, Scratch the Surface, was released in 1994 to critical acclaim and included the singles "Scratch the Surface" and "Step Down". They released another album on East West, 1997's Built to Last, before signing with Fat Wreck Chords the following year, which released the band's next three studio albums. They signed to Abacus Records afterwards, a subsidiary of Century Media. This label released their eighth studio album Death to Tyrants in 2006 to positive reviews (Abacus eventually went out of business, though Sick of It All would remain on Century Media, which released the band's next three albums). Sick of It All's latest album, Wake the Sleeping Dragon!, was released in 2018.

== History ==
=== Early career (1986–1992) ===
Formed in 1986, the members met while attending Francis Lewis High School in Queens, New York City, the band was formed by Lou Koller on bass and vocals, Pete Koller on guitar and David Lamb on drums. The Koller brothers originally intended for their first band to be named General Chaos, however Lamb proposed calling the band Sick of All, with the intent to abbreviate it to S.O.A. Lou pointed out that another band existed with that name and decided to expand the name to Sick of It All. After recruiting bassist Mark McNeely, the band played their first show on Saturday May 17, 1986, just a month after they formed, at the Right Track Inn in Long Island, supporting Youth of Today, Straight Ahead and Crippled Youth, the show was booked by future bandmate Craig Setari. After this performance, Lamb and McNeely left the band, leading to the brothers hiring Rich Cipriano as bassist and Armand Majidi as a "fill-in" drummer. This lineup also played its first show at the Right Track. The band recorded the Sick of It All demo in 1987 and the band began to play Sunday afternoon matinees at renowned venue CBGB's, and soon after released a self-titled 7" on Revelation Records (which was later re-issued on the tenth anniversary of its release, in 1997).

Revelation had also expressed interest in releasing Sick of It All's debut album but told the band they would have to wait a year as they were planning to release an album by Gorilla Biscuits. So instead Sick of It All signed to Relativity Records in 1988, the band's deal with Relativity was to last for seven albums; Lou said they signed as they thought they would disband after their first. "We were kids [...] we didn't think we'd be doing this forever." Throughout the year Sick of It All toured the US as an opening act for bands such as Youth of Today, Agnostic Front and Murphy’s Law. They were also tabbed by Exodus to open on five shows during their East Coast tour. They then recorded their first full-length album, Blood, Sweat, and No Tears, which was released in 1989. The album was a surprise success, selling over 100,000 copies, and being met with positive reception and is viewed as a classic in the hardcore genre, Chris Ingham of Metal Hammer called it a "blueprint" for New York hardcore in the 1980s. Whilst Joachim Hiller of Ox-Fanzine said it "heralded a generational shift in NYHC, establishing the tone for the 1990s and the growing popularity of the genre."

The band embarked on their first national tour in support of the album, as both a headliner and supporting act for Bad Brains, joining halfway through Bad Brains' Quickness tour with Leeway, and touring the West Coast of the United States with both bands for two weeks. Thereafter, Majidi left Sick of It All to focus on his other band Rest in Pieces, and Max Capshaw was recruited as his replacement. On September 15, 1989, Sick of It All performed a showcase with Killing Time and Nuclear Assault at the Sundance in Bay Shore, after which they embarked on a headlining tour of the North Eastern United States in the fall of 1989. The band also filmed a music video for "Injustice System". Lou was dissatisfied with the video, believing it was too censored and that Majidi should have been in it instead of Capshaw, since he performed on the record. Majidi ultimately returned to Sick of It All for a national tour with D.R.I., with Capshaw "[not working] out because he was too young", according to Lou.

Prior to touring with Agnostic Front in 1990, Cipriano and Majidi both left Sick of It All. The Koller brothers decided to continue the band, replacing both departed members with Eddie Coen and Eric Komst, respectively. Both members appear alongside photos of the old lineup in the liner notes of the We Stand Alone EP (1991), which Lou and Pete intended to show they were committed to continuing Sick of It All. Coen left to join Cycle Sluts from Hell following the Agnostic Front tour, and Komst was later fired. In 1991 they took part in the New Titans on the Bloc tour with Sepultura, Sacred Reich and Napalm Death. By the time Sick of It All recorded their second album Just Look Around (1992), Majidi and Cipriano had rejoined the band. Prior to the album's release Sick of It All embarked on a spring European tour, they then toured the continent once again in support of the album during the winter of that year.

=== Rising popularity (1993–1997) ===
Sick of It All began 1993 playing a handful of shows in Japan, before touring the US as an opening act for Biohazard and Sheer Terror. In August and September of that year they held a European headlining tour with Graveyard Rodeo and Black Train Jack serving as supporting acts. They also released their first live album titled Live in a World Full of Hate which was recorded during a show in New Jersey.

During May and June 1994, Sick of It All toured Europe once again playing multiple festivals and opening for bands such as Leeway, Only Living Witness and Obituary. In October of that year Sick of It All released their record Scratch the Surface on major label EastWest Records. They also recorded a video for "Step Down" and the title track "Scratch the Surface". The record was the first recorded with long-time friend and former Straight Ahead, Rest in Pieces, Youth of Today and Agnostic Front bass player Craig Setari, who had replaced Rich Cipriano, in early 1993. Scratch the Surface became the band’s first album to chart debuting at number 67 in Germany, the "Scratch the Surface" video debuted on MTV's Headbangers Ball on December 10, 1994, whilst the "Step Down" video—in a feat described as "previously unimaginable" by Stephen Hill of Metal Hammer UK—entered rotation on MTV.

The album is their highest performing album, selling over 250,000 copies and receiving generally positive reviews upon its release. In The Trouser Press Guide to '90s Rock (1997), Ira Robbins described the album as "a blast of unreconstructed hardcore in a time and a place where such a thing was once impossible to imagine". Scratch the Surface is retrospectively described as a classic album, and in 2012 it was inducted into the Decibel Hall of Fame. That same year in an interview with Decibel, Pete said that he considered Scratch the Surface to be Sick of It All's most important album as it "pushed [the band] up into the higher realm" of songwriting and popularity, whilst Majidi saw it as the band's "quintissential album [...] that we are always forced to try to top."

Sick of It All embarked on a worldwide tour in support for Scratch the Surface, touring North and South America, Europe, Japan, and New Zealand. In October 1994, the band toured with Strife for two weeks. In November, they supported Helmet and Quicksand across the United States, before playing ten shows with Black Train Jack in December. In January 1995, Sick of It All toured Europe and played four shows in the United Kingdom supported by Strife and Understand, before returning to the United States for a headlining tour with supporting acts featuring Korn, Orange 9MM and Trial that lasted until March 1995. The album helped boost their popularity worldwide and according to Mike Hill of Vice, Scratch the Surface "took NYHC worldwide" and turned Sick of It All into "the closest the hardcore scene has to a household name." With the success of Scratch the Surface it allowed the band to tour worldwide, and In 1995 took part in the first installment of the warped tour.

In 1997, they released their next record on the EastWest sister label Elektra, Built to Last which debuted at number 32 on the US Heatseekers charts. The record featured a number of live staples for the band, including "Us vs. Them", "Busted" and "Good Lookin' Out". Sick of It All toured with Napalm Death and Sepultura during the album cycle, while also making another appearance at that years warped tour. Entertainment Weekly wrote that with the album the band manages "to overcome the genre’s bark-and-lunge cliches simply because they’re so archetypal; these guys can actually make you feel the fury behind a song called 'Us Vs. Them'.” The album also marked the end of Sick of It All's contractual agreement with EastWest. That same year Revelation reissued their debut EP on both vinyl and CD to commemorate its 10th anniversary. The band toured worldwide in support of the album and once again taking part in the Warped tour.

=== The Fat Wreck Chords years (1998–2004) ===
In 1998, Sick of It All signed to independent record label Fat Wreck Chords, owned and run by Fat Mike of NOFX. After releasing the "Potential for a Fall" single – for which another video was filmed, Call To Arms was released in February 1999 and debuted at number 84 on the German charts. This album was also met with positive reception, with Kevin Ruggeri of Pitchfork stating: "Call to Arms proves once again that Sick of It All are masters of their genre. For over a decade, they have consistently provided the best hardcore their genre has to offer, and with their promise to stick around considered, the future of the scene seems bright indeed." In early 1999 while doing a show in Argentina infront of 2,000 people, Slayer who were playing a festival in Argentina the following day attended the show. Following the concert the members of Slayer went backstage to tell Sick of it All "We had to see what fucking band could draw 2,000 people when there's a sold-out festival the next day." This resulted in Sick of it All touring with Slayer and Meshuggah later that same year.

The 2000 follow-up Yours Truly was less critically acclaimed. Despite containing some of the band's favored live tracks, including "Blown Away", "The Bland Within", "District" and "America", some fans felt alienated by the album's progressive nature and in a recent interview, frontman Lou Koller claimed that the album's cover art probably contributed to its poor reception.

In 2001, Sick of It All released their home video The Story So Far the documentary showed the bands career up to that point from their beginnings to their unexpected rise to fame, along with personal insight from band members. A year later a live record was released as part of Fat Wreck Chords' Live in a Dive series. The album showcased tracks from Sick of It All's entire career up to that point in time. That same year they also took part in the Deconstruction Tour, and took part in an extensive US headlining tour with Death by Stereo, during March and April of that year. In late 2002 Sick of It All toured the US with Most Precious Blood, and The Program serving as support.

2003 saw Sick of It All released their seventh studio album: Life on the Ropes. Kurt Morris of AllMusic wrote “Even after more than 15 years, Sick of It All's Life on the Ropes finds the band as heavy, fast, and fun as ever while still allowing plenty of room for some thoughtful lyrics.” They then embarked on the first leg of the "Vans Off the Wall" tour alongside The Unseen and Avenged Sevenfold. In 2004, the band also released an album of B-sides, covers and rare tracks entitled Outtakes for the Outcast. In November 2004, Sick of It All headlined the Eastpak Resistance Tour supporting acts consisted of Walls of Jericho, Slapshot and Unearth.

=== Death to Tyrants (2005–2007) ===
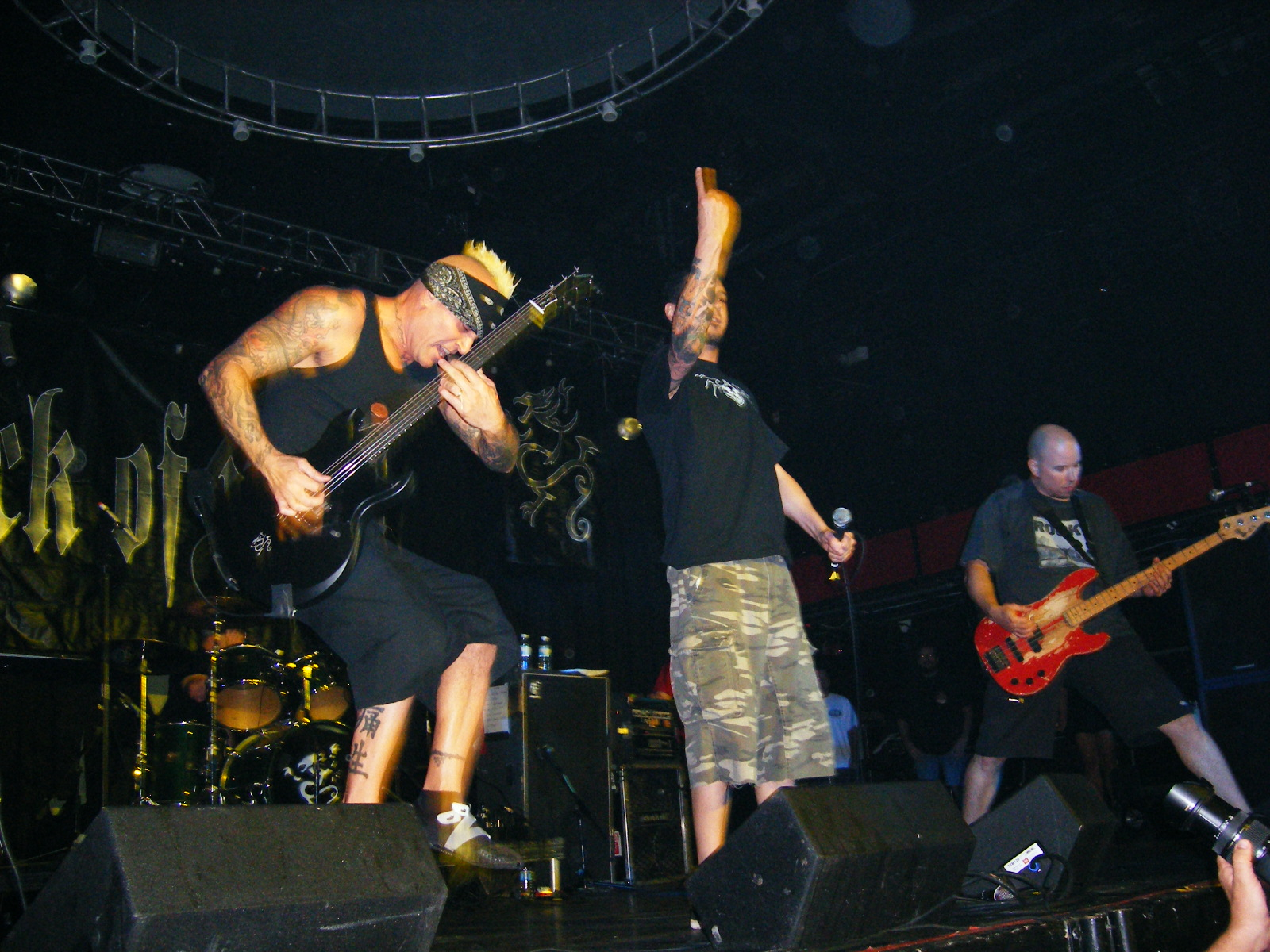
Sick of It All on their 20th Anniversary Tour in 2006

In early 2005, Sick of It All signed to Abacus Recordings to record the follow-up to Fat Wreck Chords' Life on the Ropes. The new album, titled Death to Tyrants, was released on April 18, 2006. AllMusic wrote with this album “Sick of It All continues to breathe life into an often oversaturated and stale hardcore scene. That same year they headlined the Persistence Tour alongside other hardcore bands such as Madball and Terror. Throughout 2006 Sick of It All, toured the US with bands such as Dropkick Murphys, First Blood and The Warriors. The group played their 20th anniversary show at the B.B. King Blues Club & Grill in New York City on September 17, 2006. They also went on a European tour during the winter of that year with Terror and Madball.

The band toured with AFI and The Dear & Departed in early 2007. During March of that year Sick of It All once again toured the US with Dropkick Murphys however during the tour frontman Lou Koller suffered a back injury leading to them dropping off the tour mid way through. They then rescheduled their European tour with Wisdom in Chains to September and held a separate tour with Madball in November. In early 2008 Sick of It All embarked on a US headlining with Death Before Dishonor, Madball and Wisdom in Chains serving as support.

A tribute to the band, titled Our Impact Will Be Felt, was released on April 24, 2007, and includes covers from artists such as Bane, Bleeding Through, the Bouncing Souls, Ignite, Comeback Kid, Hatebreed, Himsa, Madball, Most Precious Blood, Napalm Death, Pennywise, Rise Against, Sepultura, Stretch Arm Strong, the Suicide Machines, Unearth, and Walls of Jericho.

=== Based on a True Story (2008–2013) ===
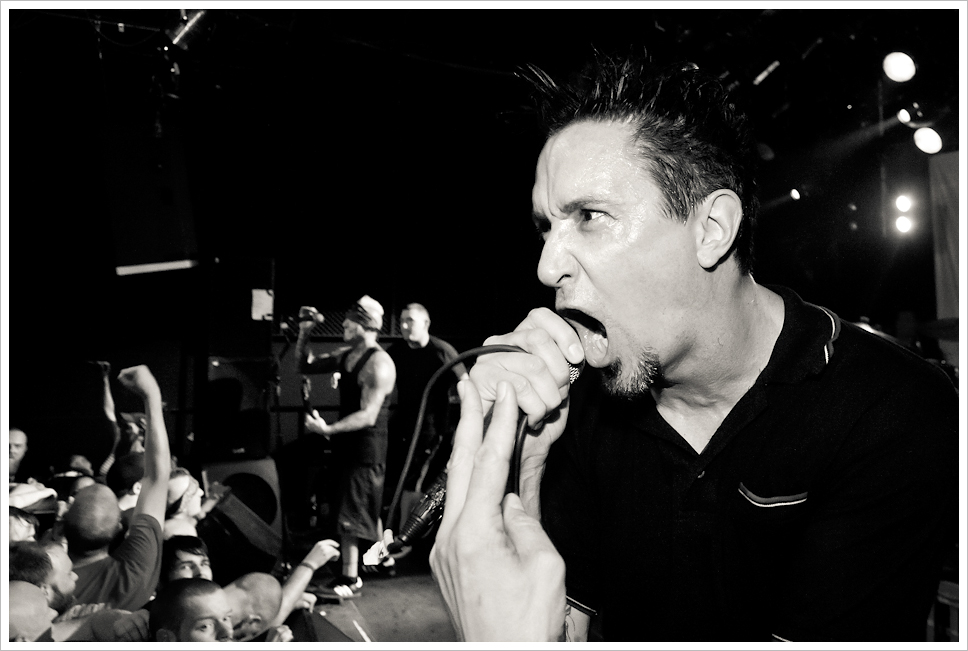
Sick of It All live at SO36. Berlin in 2011

Following a worldwide tour in support of Death to Tyrants, Sick of It All began working on new material for their next album. In an August 2009 interview with singer Lou Koller, he revealed that the band would begin recording their new album in November for a 2010 release. In January 2010, it was announced the band had signed with Century Media Records to release their next album. Based on a True Story, the first Sick of It All album in four years, was released on April 20, 2010. The album debuted at number 30 on the US Heatseekers Chart along with charting in several European countries. The band worked with producer Tue Madsen who produced the band’s previous effort. However instead of recording in their native New York they travelled to Madsen’s hometown of Copenhagen, Denmark to record the album. Gregory of AllMusic wrote “While Sick of It All may not be reinventing the wheel, they are showing that they’re still making the same high quality wheel they’ve always made.” They toured the UK with AFI and Dear & Departed in April 2010.

In January 2011, they embarked on a US headlining tour with Outbreak, Alpha & Omega, Sick of It All then toured in Australia with Rise Against to support their Endgame tour, along with a South American tour alongside Comeback Kid in March. Also In 2011, the band released "XXV Nonstop" on Century Media to celebrate the band's 25 year career, which was a selection of re-recorded songs from the band's discography. They played a special 25th anniversary show on March 26 at Webster Hall in New York City, Snapcase and Merauder opened for them. In November of that year they toured Europe alongside Shai Hulud.

They continued touring into 2012 and 2013 including a summer tour in 2013, which included performances at big festivals such as Hellfest in France and Soundwave in Australia.

=== Last Act of Defiance (2014–2017) ===
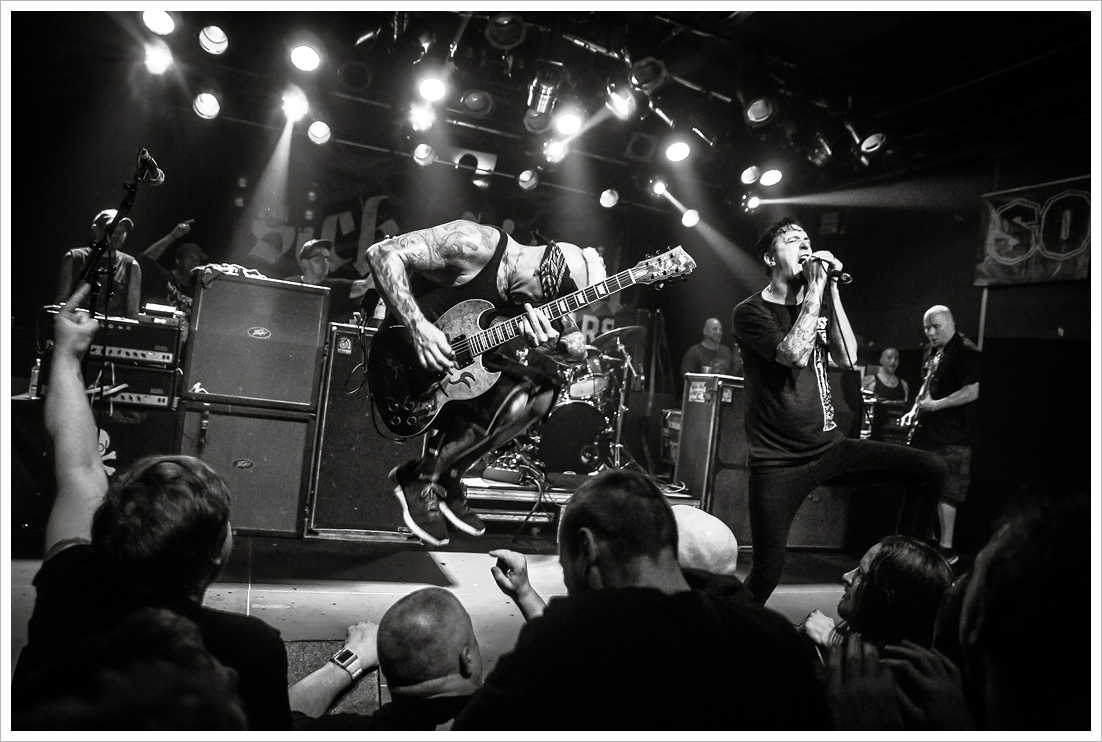
Sick of It All performing at the SO36 in Berlin 2016

In November 2011, singer Lou Koller revealed to AbsolutePunk writer Dre Okorley that Sick of It All had begun writing a follow-up to Based on a True Story. He stated: "Right now we're concentrating on writing our new record, inspired by the last two tours we've done with different bands. We have some really good lyrics and tons of songs done. We'll see what happens. We've just got a lotta good stuff coming up." The album, tilted Last Act of Defiance, was released on September 30, 2014. The album charted in multiple European countries with the highest being number 79 in Belgium. Trey of Sputnikmusic wrote “The Last Act of Defiance isn’t here to dazzle you with musicianship and diversity, it’s here to bludgeon in a way that only good hardcore can.” During the summer of 2014, Sick of It All held both a European and North American tour in support of the album. While on tour they celebrated their albums Scratch the Surface and Blood, Sweat, and No Tears playing both in their entireties at the Fun Fun Fun Fun Fest in Austin, Texas.

Sick of It All toured all over the world in 2015 starting with a tour of Great Britain and Ireland from January to February. They then embarked on a short South America tour, a tour of Asia, and a spring tour. On September 13, 2015 the band played a special show at Surf Pavillon in Coney Island, during a celebration event for the 1979 film The Warriors.

Sick of It All spent much of 2016 and 2017 celebrating their 30th anniversary with a worldwide tour. To coincide with this anniversary, the band released an EP of new material, When the Smoke Clears, on November 4, 2016. They played their 30th anniversary hometown show on July 9, 2016, at Webster Hall with support from Murphy's Law. In 2017 they also toured the US as part of the Vans Warped Tour.

=== Wake the Sleeping Dragon! (2018–2023) ===
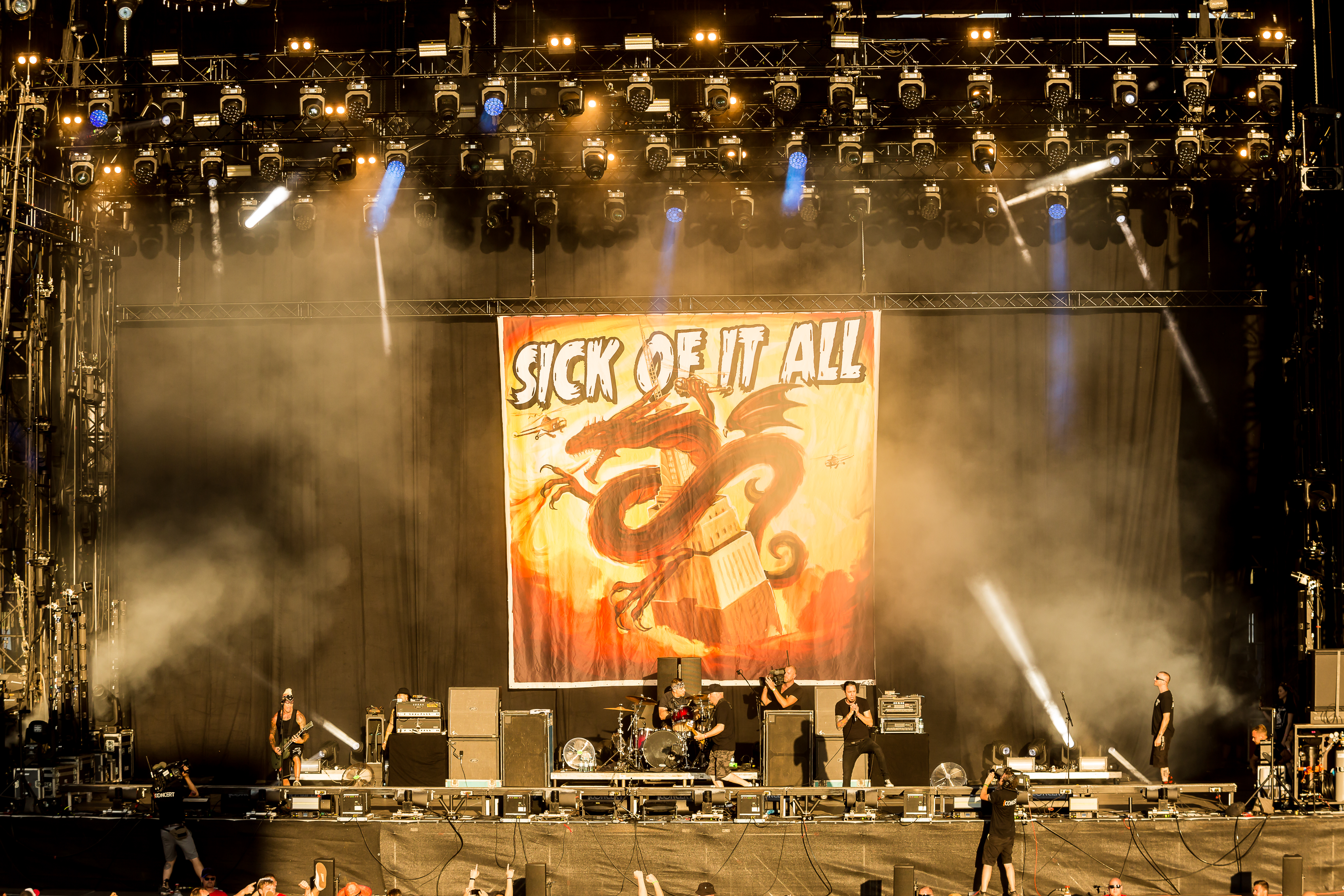
Sick of It All with Full Force 2019

By December 2016, Sick of It All had begun working on their twelfth studio album, Wake the Sleeping Dragon!, which was released on November 2, 2018. The album debuted at number 17 on the US Heatseakers Charts, and number 31 in Germany. It was met with critical acclaim from critics, Stephen Hill of Metal Hammer wrote 'They've never sounded better' Tom of Punknews added "Wake the Sleeping Dragon! is not sensitive, subtle, nuanced singer songwriter fare. It's aggressive, angry and in your face. In other words, it's exactly what hardcore should be." The band then toured in support of the album.

In early 2019 they embarked on the EMP Persistence Tour alongside Ignite and Walls of Jericho. From March to June 2019, Sick of It All held an extensive US and European headlining tour featuring multiple supporting acts such as Slapshot, Brick By Brick, Wisdom In Chains, Iron Reagan and La Armada. In late 2019 the Sick Of It All embarked on the Dragon Fire tour alongside Comeback Kid, Cancer Bats and This Means War.

The band did not tour at all in 2020, however that same year both Pete and Lou released an autobiography they wrote together titled The Blood and Sweat: The Story of Sick of It All's Koller Brothers. The book goes over the two brother's entire lives from childhood to their time in the band, it also featured commentary from other band members past and present. Decibel called it "one the best books ever written about hardcore". Sick of it All only played a handful of shows in 2021, however they made a full comeback to touring in 2022, with shows in the US and Europe along with co headlining tour with Agnostic Front. Pete Koller missed the European tour to undergo surgery for a hernia, with Craig Silverman of Agnostic Front filling in for him. After holding their own summer European tour in 2023, they then embarked on an co headlining tour alongside Life of Agony. In September of that year the band stated that they were hoping to release their 12th studio album in early 2024.

=== Lou Koller's health problems and death, and future plans (2024–present) ===
In early 2024 the group held a short Australian tour. In June of that year Sick of It All cancelled an upcoming European tour set to begin in July. Following the announcement, vocalist Lou Koller revealed his diagnosis with an esophageal tumor, which would require treatment over the course of the summer. In November of 2024 a benefit show was held in Support of Koller with many bands such as Life of Agony, Municipal Waste, Crown of Thornz and Vision of Disorder playing at the show. Koller announced in May 2025 that he was "officially cancer free" and "excited to move forward and get Sick of It All back on track".

In August 2025, bassist Craig Setari confirmed that new music from Sick of It All was in the works, and added that "the plan is in 2026, somewhere in the warm weather of 2026, to potentially play some shows, if everything goes like it's been going." Near the end of September, however, Lou Koller announced that the cancer had returned. On July 24, 2026, Sick of It All announced on social media that Koller had died following his battle with cancer, with a statement that read: "It's with unbelievable sadness that we announce to our worldwide hardcore family the passing of our brother Lou Koller. The level of loss that we feel at this time is overwhelming. This year would have marked Sick of it All's 40th anniversary as a band, and Lou's camaraderie, commitment and enthusiasm were always steadfast throughout the years. We have lost beloved friend and an iconic frontman. Lou had the power to raise everyone's spirits at our shows with a smile and a sarcastic comment, and he won people over wherever we played, from every culture and every corner of the world."

On September 13, 2026, Lou's brother Pete Koller announced in a video posted on his Instagram that Sick of It All will continue as a band, in line with his wishes.

== Artistry ==
=== Musical style and influence ===
Sick of It All is a hardcore punk band, being one of the first bands to push its sub-genre tough guy hardcore. Kerrang! described them as "the standard bearers for New York hardcore". They have always grounded their lyrics in reality — dealing with community, politics, social issues, as well as frustration, anger, identity. They're not fantasy / escapism, but reflection and often admonishment.

Their songs often feature aggressive, high-energy riffs and pummeling rhythms. Pete Koller's guitar playing is known to be distorted with crunchy tones. Lead singer Lou Koller’s vocal delivery has been described as super scratchy, often intimidating, sometimes melodic, and always fiercely-delivered." Zachary Lipez of Vice wrote that the band's sound has been "indebted to Oi! and street punk as it is their hardcore roots." Regarding the band's identity as a hardcore punk band, Jon Weiderhorn, writing for Guitar World magazine, said: "If Sick of It All were from sunny California, they might sound similar to happycore bands like Green Day and the Offspring. But Sick of It All hail from crime-infested, claustrophobic New York City, and so their sound is on the hostile, Manhattan hardcore side. Like Agnostic Front, the Cro-Mags and Yuppicide, their New York state of mind is grim."

When asked about the band's lyrics lead singer Lou Koller stated:

"When I write lyrics, and it might be left of center but I try to keep it general so that people will actually try to relate to it. And when someone who maybe has opposing views relates to that song then maybe it starts a dialogue."

They have cited influences including Agnostic Front, Reagan Youth, Murphys Law, the Exploited, Discharge, GBH and Motörhead. Guitarist Pete Koller was influenced to play guitar in a band by the Plasmatics and Black Sabbath.

=== Mascot ===
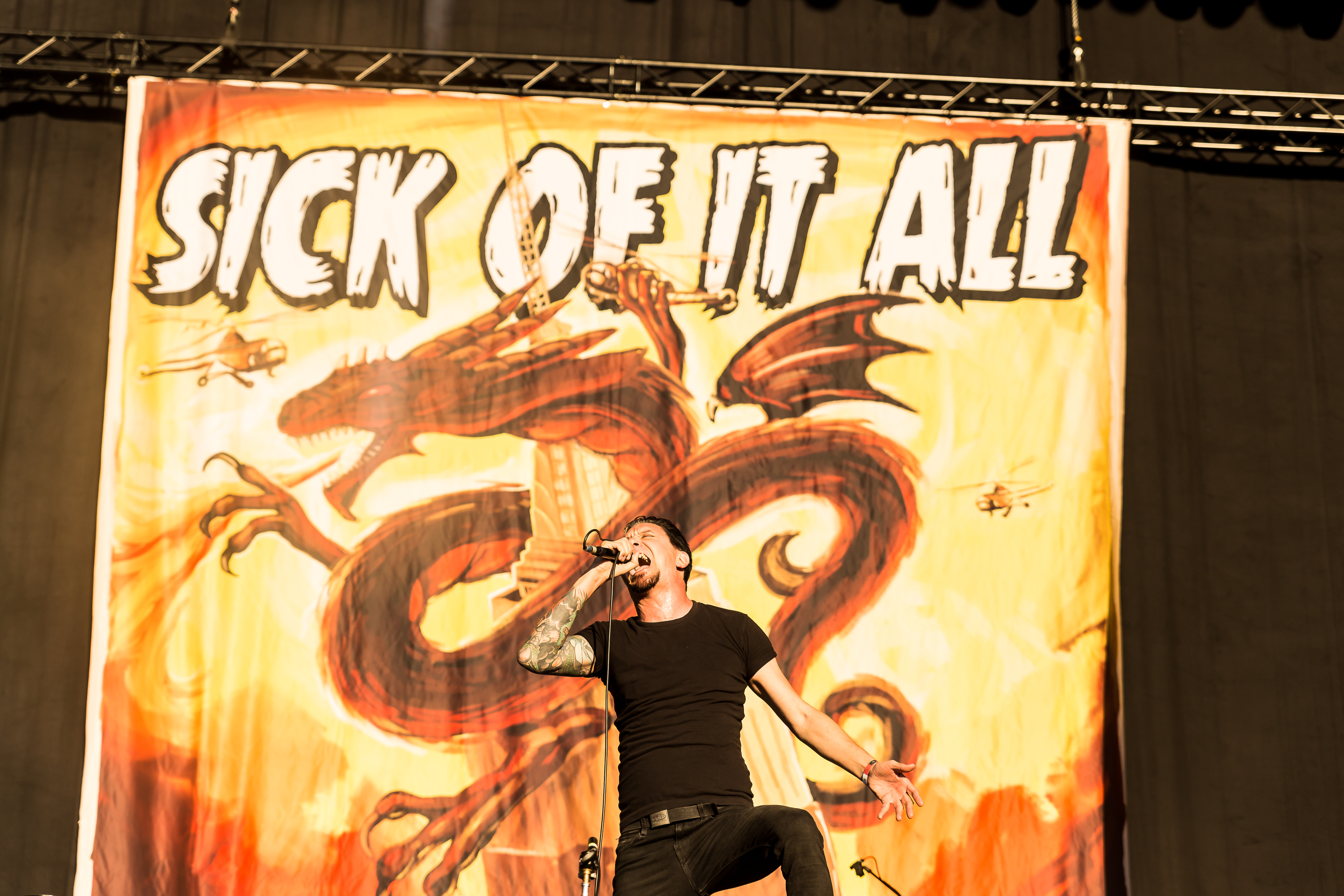
The bands signature dragon logo on their banner during a live show in 2018

Sick of It All's mascot is dragon, unlike other band mascots it does not have an official name, and has appeared on the cover art of 7 of their 11 studio albums. Its first appearance unintentionally came on their first ever self-titled 1987 EP. Lou Koller has stated the logo was inspired by a drawing the band seen in a flash sheet by tattoo artist Greg Irons. Koller added:

"It was when one of our friends was joining the Marines, and he was, like, 17 or 18, and we all decided to get a tattoo together because we had this crew who always hung out together. I think it was Pete [Koller] who redesigned the dragon for us, and it just happened to be in the photo of our first seven inch. It was a photo of my tattoo of it and then it just got associated with us from then on."

=== Live performances ===
Sick of it All is known to put on high energy live performances, guitarist Pete Koller is known for high-kicking and his guitar-spinning Tasmanian devil impression, his brother Lou's gravel-throated, along with audience interaction and stage dives. Metal Hammer commented on the bands live performances stating "Sick of It All make Slayer look inconsistent and make Hatebreed sound like Blink 182. They're the best true hardcore band of all time."

Some have also credited the band with inventing the "wall of death" (also known as the "Braveheart") in which the crowd would split into two sides and charge the other at the start of selected songs. However, in 2019, lead singer Lou Koller confirmed the band did not invent the idea but they did help bring it back.

Koller stated in an interview from the Live in NYC '91 VHS:

Our music was written [for] total crowd participation, cause that's how we grew up. Early hardcore was total crowd participation. You know, pile on, sing along, all that stuff. That’s your outlet. It kind of dulls the energy when you have a six-foot barricade from the stage to the audience.

== Legacy ==
Sick of It All (alongside Agnostic Front, Cro-Mags, Madball and Warzone) have been described as a pioneering New York hardcore band. The group are also credited with helping define what NYHC sounds like, specifically the tough guy hardcore sound that emerged from the scene, as well as how it operates not just musically, but also from a community standpoint. Vice described them as the "Titans of NYHC". In a 2025 poll held by Alternative Press Magazine, Sick of It All was voted the greatest NYHC hardcore band of all time. The publication added "SOIA truly represent the heart of NYHC, throwing energy, intention, and integrity into everything they do."

Their 1994 album Scratch the Surface is often viewed as one of the best hardcore albums of all time, and is often cited as a turning point, as it pushed NYHC to wider audiences and is seen as one of the most important records in the genre, and has been described as the "hardcore magnum opus". In 2024, readers of Revolver voted the album as the second-greatest NYHC album of all time, behind the Cro-Mags' The Age of Quarrel (1986). Their debut album Blood, Sweat, and No Tears has also been credited for popularizing the breakdown in hardcore. Kerrang! also said the record "helped change the definition of New York hardcore as the world knew it."

Sick of It All have also been credited for exposing hardcore to a wider audience. They did this by touring with non hardcore acts. Lou Koller told Kerrang! Magazine in 2018:

We wanted to show the world what we loved, That's why we didn't just play with hardcore bands. On our first run down the East Coast in 1988, Exodus asked us to open up for them for five shows. It was a shock to the audience when we walked out: Kids with short hair! As we got more popular some people referred to us as 'The Kings of New York hardcore,' and we were always, 'No, no. We're the ambassadors.

Bands such as Earth Crisis, Kill Your Idols, XTRMST, AFI, Rise Against, Killswitch Engage, Pantera and Movielife, have all cited the band as a influence.

== Members ==
Sick of It All live at Full Force 2019

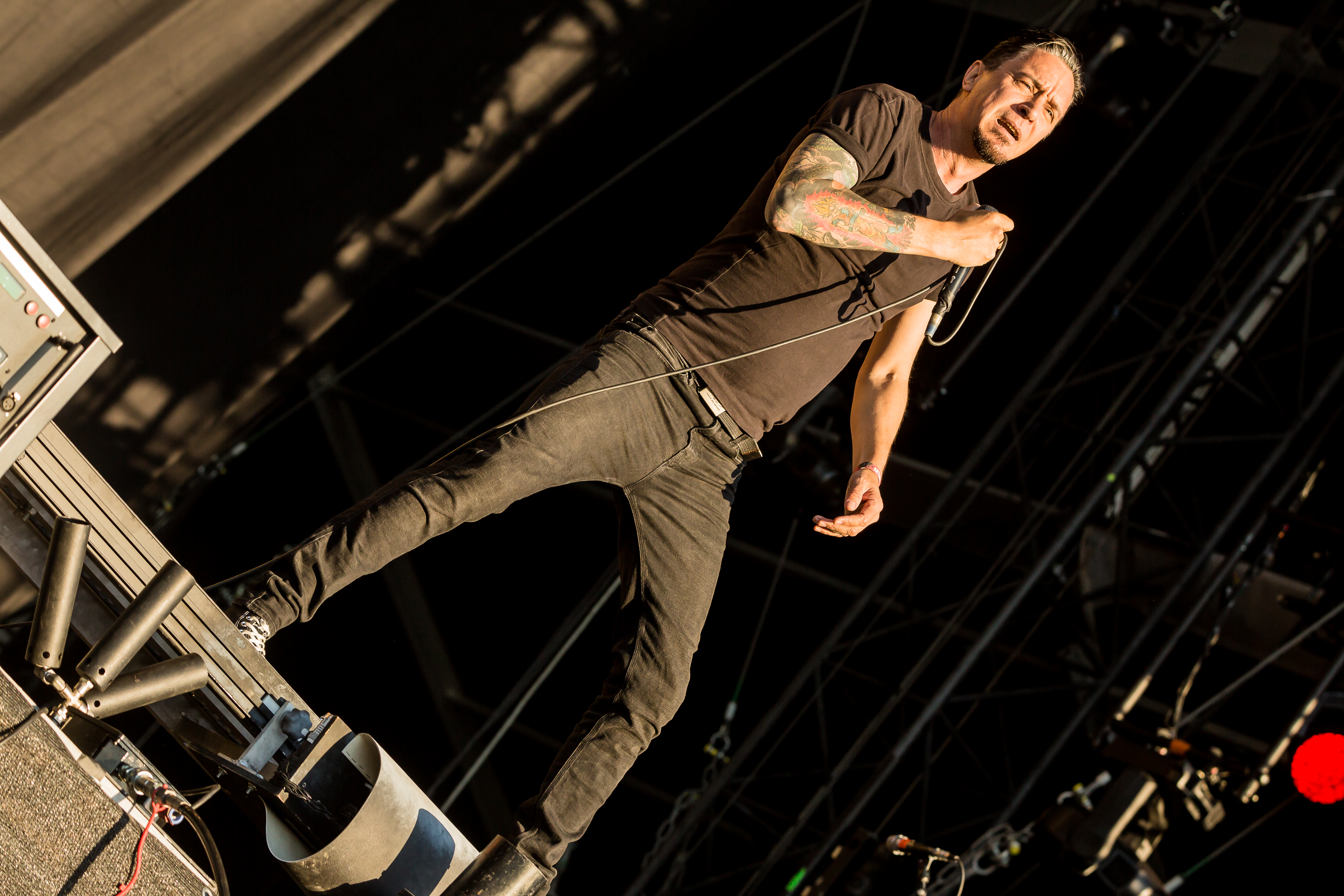
Lou Koller

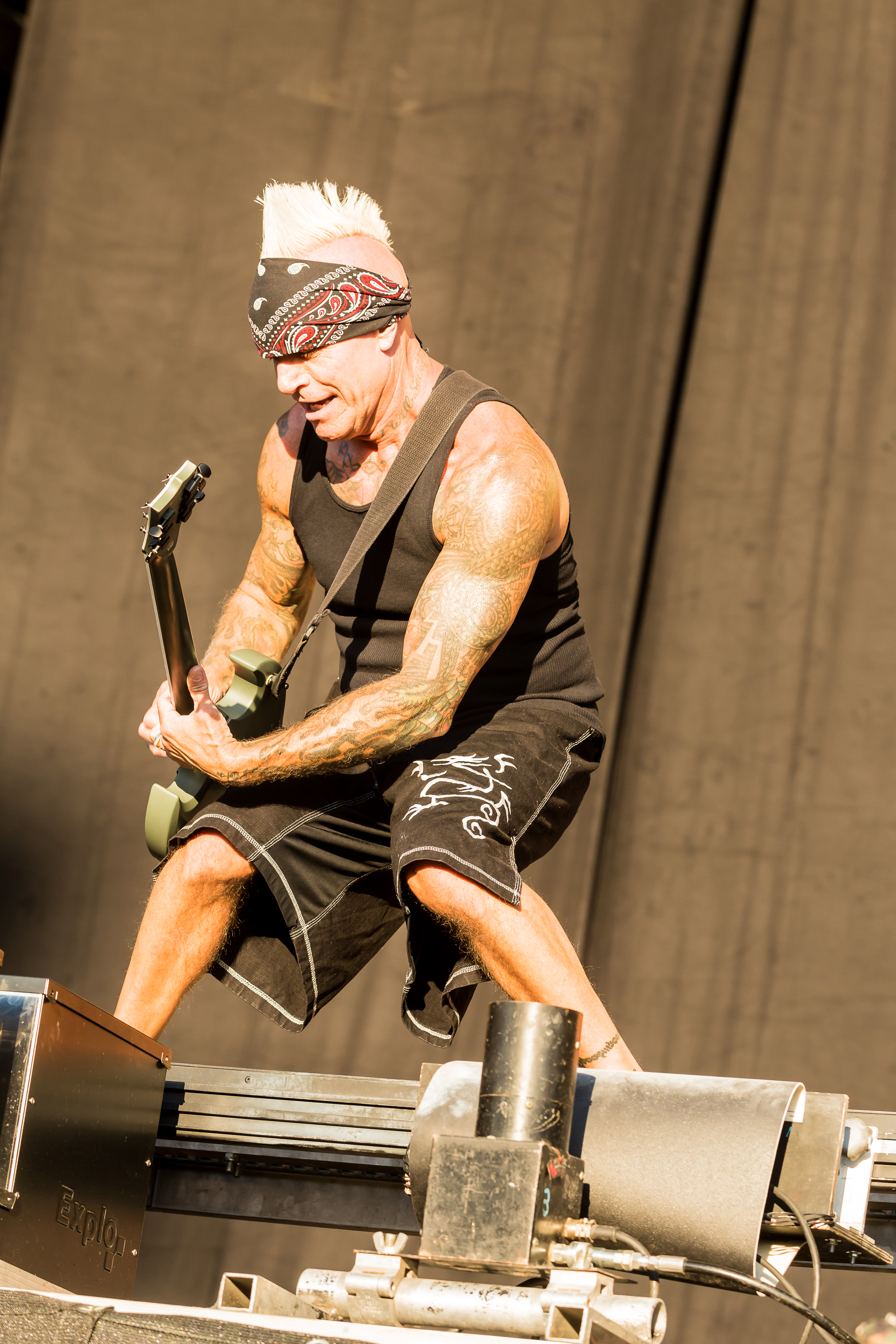
Pete Koller

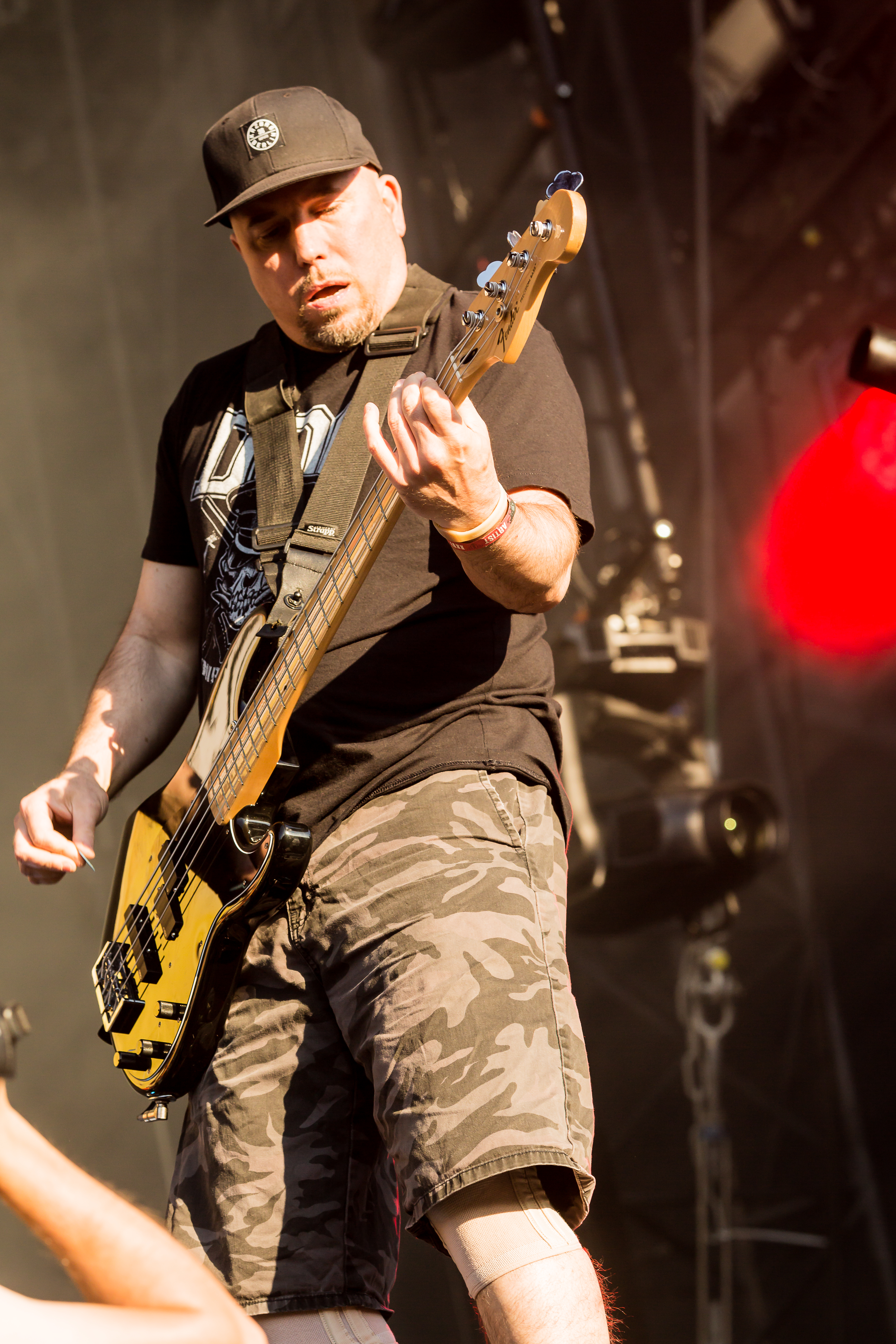
Craig Setari

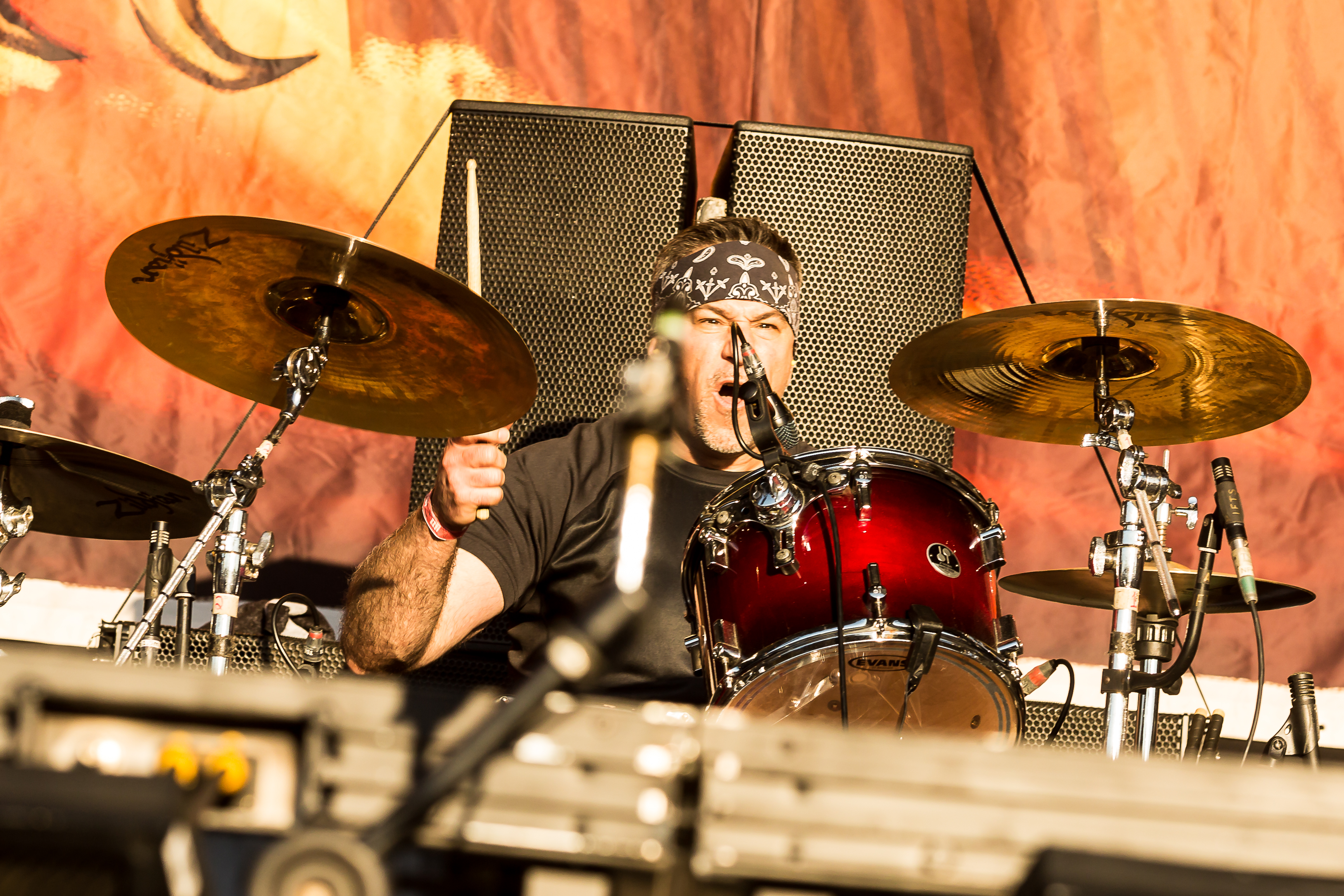
Armand Majidi

=== Current members ===
- Pete Koller – guitars, backing vocals (1986–present)
- Armand Majidi – drums (1986–1989, 1991–present)
- Craig Setari – bass, backing vocals (1993–present)

=== Former members ===
- David Lamb – drums (1986)
- Mark McNeely – bass (1986)
- Rich Cipriano – bass (1986–1991, 1992)
- Lou Koller – lead vocals (1986–2026), bass (1986); died 2026
- Max Capshaw – drums (1989–1991)
- Eddie Coen – bass (1991-1992)
- Eric Komst – drums (1991–1992)
- A.J. Novello – bass (1992)

=== Touring ===
- Craig Silverman – guitar (2022)

== Discography ==
=== Studio albums ===
- Blood, Sweat, and No Tears (1989)
- Just Look Around (1992)
- Scratch the Surface (1994)
- Built to Last (1997)
- Call to Arms (1999)
- Yours Truly (2000)
- Life on the Ropes (2003)
- Death to Tyrants (2006)
- Based on a True Story (2010)
- XXV Nonstop (2011)
- The Last Act of Defiance (2014)
- Wake the Sleeping Dragon! (2018)

== Awards and nominations ==
NAIRD

| Year | Work/nommine | Award | Result |
|---|---|---|---|
| 1989 | Blood, Sweat, and No Tears | Best Heavy Metal album | Nominated |

Decibel Hall of Fame

| Year | Work/nommine | Award | Result |
|---|---|---|---|
| 2012 | Scratch the Surface | Decibel Hall of Fame | Inducted |

Metalstorm awards

| Year | Work/nommine | Award | Result |
|---|---|---|---|
| 2010 | Based on a True Story | The Best Hardcore / Metalcore / Deathcore Album | Nominated |

== In popular culture ==
- The professional wrestler CM Punk is a fan of the band and yells "It's clobberin' time!", during his entrance in reference to the bands song with the same name.
- The bands song "Step Down" was featured in the season 5 episode of Bevis and Butt-Head titled "Premature Evacuation"
