= Just Look Around =

Studio album by Sick of It All
- Released: October 6, 1992
- Recorded: 1991
- Studio: Normandy (Warren, Rhode Island)
- Genre: Hardcore punk
- Length: 29:44
- Labels: Combat, Relativity
- Producer: Sick of It All

Sick of It All chronology
We Stand Alone (1991)	Just Look Around (1992)	Scratch the Surface (1994)

Professional ratings
Review scores
Source	Rating
The Encyclopedia of Popular Music	3/5 stars
The Great Metal Discography	6/10
Kerrang!	4/5 stars
MusicHound Rock	3/5 stars

Just Look Around is the second full-length album by American band Sick of It All, released on October 6, 1992. It is the follow-up to the band's first album, Blood, Sweat and No Tears (1989). "What's Goin' On" laments gun violence.

== Track listing ==
1. "We Want the Truth" – 2:55
2. "Locomotive" – 2:12
3. "The Pain Strikes" – 3:06
4. "Shut Me Out" – 2:12
5. "What's Goin' On" – 2:10
6. "Never Measure Up" – 1:37
7. "Just Look Around" – 2:41
8. "Violent Generation" – 1:32
9. "The Shield" – 2:37
10. "Now It's Gone" – 2:10
11. "We Stand Alone" – 2:44
12. "Will We Survive" – 1:32
13. "Indust." – 2:03
