= Profile Records =

1981–1999 American record label

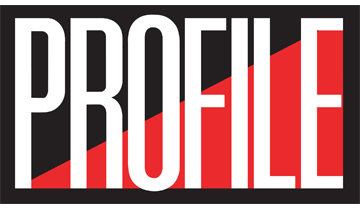
- Parent company: Independent (1981–1998); Arista Records (1998–2004); Sony BMG Music Entertainment (2004–2008); Sony Music Entertainment (2008–present)
- Founded: 1981
- Founder: Cory Robbins; Steve Plotnicki
- Defunct: 1999
- Status: Defunct, back-catalog reissues only by Sony
- Distributor: Legacy Recordings
- Genre: Hip-hop
- Country of origin: United States
- Official website: profile-records.com

Profile Records was one of the earliest hip-hop/rap labels. As well as rap, the label also released disco and dance records.

== History ==
In 1980, Cory Robbins, who was 23 at the time and had worked briefly for MCA, wanted to start a record label. He invited his songwriter friend Steve Plotnicki to be a partner. They each borrowed $17,000 from their parents, purchased the little used Panorama Records subsidiary from MCA, and Profile Records was born.Their tiny office opened at 250 West 57th street in NYC on May 1, 1981. First artists signed were Grace Kennedy and Lonnie Love.

With the success of “Genius Rap” by Dr. Jeckyll & Mr. Hyde, they escaped financial ruin by a mere $2,000. From there it was Gidea Park's “Seasons of Gold” that brought more commercial and financial success, becoming Profile Records’ first hit to make the Billboard Hot 100. In 1982 the fledgling label gained international recognition with the club hit "I Specialize in Love", recorded by Sharon Brown, licensed to Virgin Records in the UK. The label continued its commercial success, with gold and platinum sales with artists such as Dana Dane, Twin Hype, Run DMC, Poor Righteous Teachers, Nemesis, and Paul Hardcastle among others.

In 1985, the label moved to a headquarters at 740 Broadway in New York. The label had numerous sub-labels such as Smile Communications (which later became independent and continued to be controlled by Plotnicki after Profile was acquired), Sea Bright Records, and Zakia Records, the label that launched the career of Eric B. & Rakim.

Profile's biggest act was Run-D.M.C., which was introduced to Robbins when manager Russell Simmons sent him a demo cassette of "It's Like That". Robbins signed the group soon after.

The partners' less than amicable split severed not only all business ties but all personal ones too. Robbins, in 2008, said he had no regrets “except for an occasional loss, it was a good experience, a positive experience but I would not change a thing.”

Profile was acquired by Arista Records in 1998, and its catalogue and artists were transferred to Arista. Sony Music Entertainment (owner of Arista since 2004) now manages much of Profile's back catalog and master recordings. Most recordings are currently out of print except for the albums of Run- D.M.C., Rob Base, and DJ Quik.

== Artists ==
=== Hip hop ===
- 2nd II None
- 52nd Street
- Camp Lo
- Caveman
- Dana Dane
- Derek B
- DJ Quik
- Dr. Jeckyll & Mr. Hyde
- N2Deep
- Nemesis
- Nine
- Poor Righteous Teachers
- Pumpkin
- Rob Base and DJ E-Z Rock
- Run-D.M.C.
- Smoothe da Hustler
- Special Ed
- Surf MC's
- Sweet Tee & Jazzy Joyce
- Twin Hype
- Vitamix

=== Others ===
- Asher D & Daddy Freddy
- Barrington Levy
- Boys Don't Cry
- Chanelle
- Cro-Mags
- The Cucumbers
- Cutty Ranks
- Grace Kennedy
- Judy Torres
- Leeway
- Moev
- Motörhead
- Murphy's Law
- Paul Hardcastle
- Plasmatics
- Sharon Brown
- The Accelerators
- The LeRoi Brothers
- The Nils
