= List of Corrosion of Conformity members =

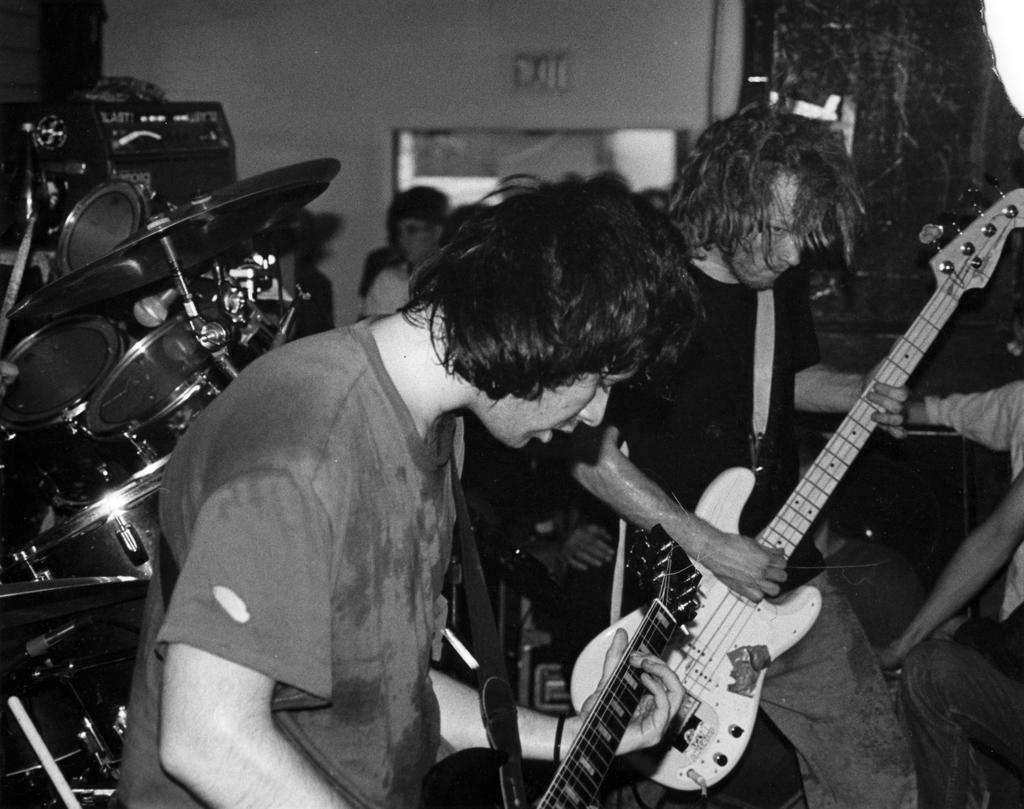
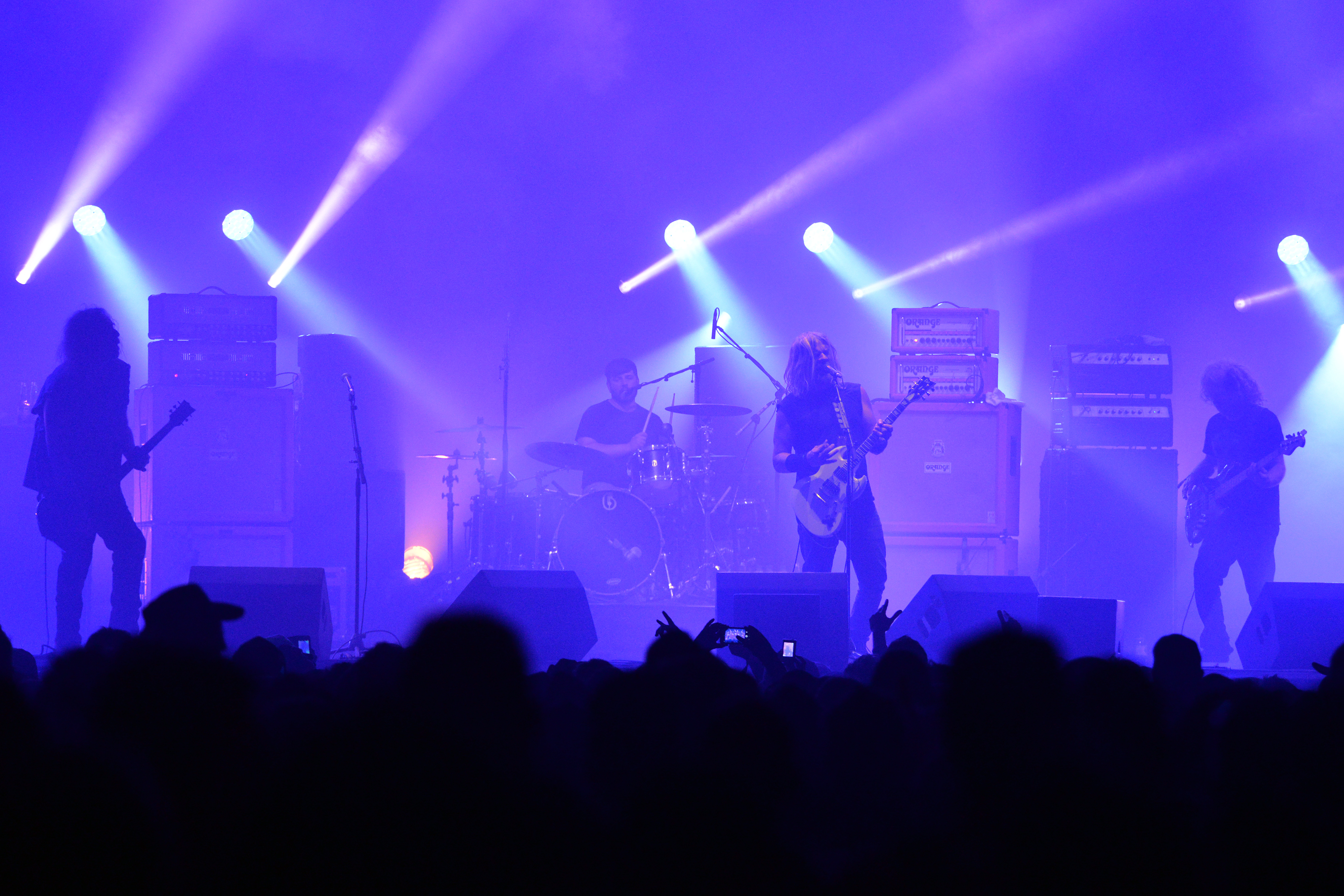
Two lineups of Corrosion of Conformity in 1986 (top) and 2018 (bottom)

Corrosion of Conformity (COC) is an American heavy metal band from Raleigh, North Carolina. Formed in June 1982, the group originally consisted of lead guitarist Woody Weatherman, bassist Mike Dean, drummer Reed Mullin and lead vocalist Benji Shelton. The band's current lineup features Weatherman (the only constant member), rhythm guitarist and lead vocalist Pepper Keenan (from 1989 to 2006, and since 2014), bassist Bobby Landgraf (who replaced Dean in 2024), and drummer Nick Shabatura (since 2026).

== History ==
=== 1982–1988 ===
COC was formed in June 1982 by Woody Weatherman, Mike Dean and Reed Mullin. Prior to taking on its final name, the group was known as Barney Fife's Army, the Accused and the Seven Ups. The band's original lead vocalist was Benji Shelton, although he had left within a year of its formation. He was replaced for "about a month and a half" by Robert Stewart, followed on a permanent basis by Eric Eycke. Shortly after the release of the group's debut album Eye for an Eye in 1984, Eycke was fired and the group continued as a trio, with Dean and Mullin handling most vocals.

In early 1986, Simon Bob Sinister (who had performed some backing vocals on Animosity the previous year) took over as COC's lead vocalist, with the EP Technocracy recorded "about six months after" his arrival. Shortly after the EP's 1987 release, Dean left and was replaced by Phil Swisher; speaking about his departure later, Dean has explained that "there was a lot to stress about, and it was kind of a relief to step away", while Sinister has claimed that the bassist "was unhappy with the direction [the band] was going". After the EP's release, Sinister left to return to Ugly Americans and the band went on a hiatus.

=== 1989–2006 ===
COC returned in May 1989 with new frontman Karl Agell. At the same time, the group also added second guitarist Pepper Keenan, who had originally auditioned for the role of lead vocalist but "wasn't really hitting the bill of what we were looking for singing-wise" according to Mullin. The new five-piece lineup released Blind in 1991 and toured extensively; however, during the early stages of production for a follow-up album in summer 1993, Agell was fired and Swisher chose to leave alongside him. Dean subsequently returned and Keenan took over on vocals.

COC's lineup remained constant throughout the rest of the decade, before it was announced at the end of 2000 that Mullin was to be replaced by Jimmy Bower due to a back injury. The new drummer contributed to Live Volume, before he left in mid-2002 to focus on other projects and was replaced by Merritt Partridge. By summer 2004, the group was recording a new album with Galactic drummer Stanton Moore, which was released as In the Arms of God the following year. Due to scheduling conflicts, Moore was replaced by Jason Patterson on tour in 2006.

=== 2006 onwards ===
Despite reportedly working on material for a new album in November 2006, the group was placed on hiatus for several years as members focused on other projects. In May 2010, the band returned with Mike Dean on lead vocals, alongside Woody Weatherman and Reed Mullin. The group remained a trio for Corrosion of Conformity and IX, before Keenan returned to the lineup in January 2015. During the touring cycle for 2018's No Cross No Crown, Mullin was often replaced by his drum technician John Green due to various health issues. Mullin died on January 27, 2020. In 2022, Jason Patterson took over from Green as touring drummer.

In September 2024, Mike Dean left the band, admitting that he had drifted away from the band since Mullin's illness and death. In October 2024, it was announced that Bobby Landgraf would join the band on bass, starting with Headbangers Boat, and later appearing in photos for sessions, alongside former drummer Stanton Moore, who had been announced as session drummer two years prior.

== Members ==
=== Current ===
Image	Name	Years active	Instruments	Release contributions
	Woody Weatherman	1982–present	lead guitar; backing vocals	all Corrosion of Conformity releases
	Pepper Keenan	1989–2006; 2015–present	rhythm guitar; vocals (lead since 1993, backing until 1993)	all COC releases from Blind (1991) to In the Arms of God (2005); since No Cross No Crown (2018)
	Bobby Landgraf	2024–present	bass; backing vocals	Good God / Baad Man (2026)
	Nick Shabatura	2026–present	drums	none to date

=== Former ===
Image	Name	Years active	Instruments	Release contributions
	Reed Mullin	1982–2001; 2010–2020 (hiatus 2019–20, until his death)	drums; vocals (co-lead 1984–86, backing otherwise)	all COC releases from Eye for an Eye (1984) to America's Volume Dealer (2000), and from Your Tomorrow Parts 1 & 2 (2010) to No Cross No Crown (2018)
	Mike Dean	1982–1987; 1993–2024	bass; keyboards; vocals (lead 1984–86 and 2006–15, backing otherwise)	all COC releases, except Blind and Good God / Baad Man
	Benji Shelton	1982–1983	lead vocals	No Core demo tape (1982)
	Robert Stewart	1983	lead vocals	None
	Eric Eycke	1983–1984 (died 2017)	lead vocals	Eye for an Eye (1984)
	Simon Bob Sinister	1986–1987	lead vocals	Animosity (1985) – guest backing vocals; Technocracy (1987); ”Bound” on Rat Music For Rat People Vol. III comp. (1987)
	Phil Swisher	1987–1993	bass	"Bound" on Rat Music For Rat People Vol. III comp. (1987); Blind (1991)
	Karl Agell	1989–1993	lead vocals; saxophone	Blind (1991)
	Jimmy Bower	2001–2002	drums; percussion	Live Volume (2001)
	Merritt Partridge	2002–2004	drums; percussion	none
	Stanton Moore	2004–2005 (session 2022–present)	drums; percussion	In the Arms of God and Good God / Baad Man
	Jason Patterson	2005–2006; 2022–2026 (touring)	drums; percussion	none
	John Green	2018–2022 (touring)	drums; backing vocals	none

== Lineups ==
Period	Members	Releases
June 1982 – 1983	Woody Weatherman – guitars, backing vocals; Mike Dean – bass, keyboards, backing vocals; Reed Mullin – drums, backing vocals; Benji Shelton – lead vocals	none
1983	Woody Weatherman – guitars, backing vocals; Mike Dean – bass, keyboards, backing vocals; Reed Mullin – drums, backing vocals; Robert Stewart – lead vocals	none
1983–1984	Woody Weatherman – guitars, backing vocals; Mike Dean – bass, keyboards, backing vocals; Reed Mullin – drums, backing vocals; Eric Eycke – lead vocals	Eye for an Eye (1984)
1984 – early 1986	Woody Weatherman – guitars, backing vocals; Mike Dean – bass, keyboards, lead and backing vocals; Reed Mullin – drums, backing and lead vocals	Animosity (1985); Six Songs with Mike Singing 1985 (1988)
Early 1986 – Early 1987	Woody Weatherman – guitars, backing vocals; Mike Dean – bass, keyboards, backing vocals; Reed Mullin – drums, backing vocals; Simon Bob Sinister – lead vocals	Technocracy (1987)
Early 1987–1989	Woody Weatherman – guitars, backing vocals; Reed Mullin – drums, backing vocals; Phil Swisher - bass; Simon Bob Sinister – lead vocals	none
May 1989 – summer 1993	Woody Weatherman – lead guitar, backing vocals; Reed Mullin – drums, backing vocals; Pepper Keenan – rhythm guitar, backing and lead vocals; Karl Agell – lead vocals, saxophone; Phil Swisher – bass	Blind (1991)
Summer 1993 – December 2000	Woody Weatherman – lead guitar, backing vocals; Reed Mullin – drums, backing vocals; Pepper Keenan – lead vocals, rhythm guitar; Mike Dean – bass, keyboards, backing vocals	Deliverance (1994); Wiseblood (1996); America's Volume Dealer (2000)
December 2000 – mid-2002	Woody Weatherman – lead guitar, backing vocals; Pepper Keenan – lead vocals, rhythm guitar; Mike Dean – bass, keyboards, backing vocals; Jimmy Bower – drums, percussion	Live Volume (2001)
Mid-2002 – summer 2004	Woody Weatherman – lead guitar, backing vocals; Pepper Keenan – lead vocals, rhythm guitar; Mike Dean – bass, keyboards, backing vocals; Merritt Partridge – drums	none
Summer 2004 – early 2005	Woody Weatherman – lead guitar, backing vocals; Pepper Keenan – lead vocals, rhythm guitar; Mike Dean – bass, keyboards, backing vocals; Stanton Moore – drums, percussion	In the Arms of God (2005)
Early 2005 – November 2006	Woody Weatherman – lead guitar, backing vocals; Pepper Keenan – lead vocals, rhythm guitar; Mike Dean – bass, keyboards, backing vocals; Jason Patterson – drums	none
Band on hiatus November 2006 – May 2010
May 2010 – January 2015	Woody Weatherman – guitars, backing vocals; Mike Dean – bass, keyboards, lead vocals; Reed Mullin – drums, backing vocals	Your Tomorrow Parts 1 & 2 (2010); Corrosion of Conformity (2012); Megalodon (2012); IX (2014)
January 2015 – January 2020	Woody Weatherman – lead guitar, backing vocals; Mike Dean – bass, keyboards, backing vocals; Reed Mullin – drums, backing vocals; Pepper Keenan – lead vocals, rhythm guitar	No Cross No Crown (2018)
January 2020 – 2022	Woody Weatherman – lead guitar, backing vocals; Mike Dean – bass, keyboards, backing vocals; Pepper Keenan – lead vocals, rhythm guitar; John Green – drums, backing vocals (touring)	none
2022 – September 2024	Woody Weatherman – lead guitar, backing vocals; Mike Dean – bass, keyboards, backing vocals; Pepper Keenan – lead vocals, rhythm guitar; Jason Patterson – drums (touring); Stanton Moore – drums (session)	none
September 2024 – 2026	Woody Weatherman – lead guitar, backing vocals; Pepper Keenan – lead vocals, rhythm guitar; Bobby Landgraf – bass, backing vocals; Jason Patterson – drums (touring); Stanton Moore – drums (session)	Good God/Baad Man (2026)
2026 – present	Woody Weatherman – lead guitar, backing vocals; Pepper Keenan – lead vocals, rhythm guitar; Bobby Landgraf – bass, backing vocals; Nick Shabatura – drums (touring); Stanton Moore – drums (session)	none to date
