= Clean My Wounds =

Single by Corrosion of Conformity

from the album Deliverance
- Released: January 1995
- Recorded: 1993–1994
- Genre: Stoner metal, hard rock
- Length: 3:33
- Label: Columbia
- Songwriter: Pepper Keenan
- Producer: John Custer

Corrosion of Conformity singles chronology
"Broken Man" (1994)	"Clean My Wounds" (1995)	"Seven Days" (1995)

"Clean My Wounds" is a song by American heavy metal band Corrosion of Conformity. It was released as the third single from the band's fourth studio album Deliverance. Written by lead vocalist/guitarist Pepper Keenan, "Clean My Wounds" was a hit on rock radio, peaking at No. 19 on the Billboard Mainstream Rock chart, the band's highest charting single along with "Albatross" (which also peaked at No. 19).

The B-side "Big Problems" originally appeared on the soundtrack for the 1994 film Clerks.

== Track listing ==
American single

No.	Title	Length
1.	"Clean My Wounds"	3:33
2.	"Shake Like You (Bulldozer Mix)"	4:29
3.	"Big Problems"	2:23

European single

No.	Title	Length
1.	"Clean My Wounds"	3:33
2.	"Lord of This World" (Black Sabbath cover)	6:26
3.	"Big Problems"	2:23

== Live performances ==
The song has been played live 239 times, making it the band's second-most-performed song; only "Vote with a Bullet" has been played live more with 271 performances. A live version of "Clean My Wounds" appears on the 2001 release Live Volume.

== Use in other media ==
The song's music video was featured in the Beavis and Butt-Head episode "Vidiots". The song was also featured in the English dub of the 1998 OVA/film Tekken: The Motion Picture.

== Personnel ==
- Pepper Keenan – lead vocals, rhythm guitar
- Woody Weatherman – lead guitar
- Mike Dean – bass
- Reed Mullin – drums, backing vocals
