= Albatross (Corrosion of Conformity song) =

Single by Corrosion of Conformity

from the album Deliverance
- Released: August 1994
- Recorded: 1993–1994
- Genre: Stoner metal, southern metal
- Length: 5:20 (album version); 4:19 (radio edit)
- Label: Columbia
- Songwriters: Pepper Keenan, Reed Mullin
- Producer: John Custer

Corrosion of Conformity singles chronology
"Vote with a Bullet" (1992)	"Albatross" (1994)	"Broken Man" (1994)

"Albatross" is a song by American heavy metal band Corrosion of Conformity. It was released as the lead single from the band's fourth studio album, Deliverance. Written by vocalist/guitarist Pepper Keenan and drummer Reed Mullin, "Albatross" was a hit on rock radio, peaking at No. 19 on the Billboard Mainstream Rock chart. The song is the band's highest charting single along with "Clean My Wounds", which also peaked at No. 19.

== Background ==
"Albatross" was the first song recorded for Deliverance and the first song the band had written after the exit of vocalist Karl Agell. In a departure from previous COC songs, "Albatross" has a strong classic rock influence, especially the Lynyrd Skynyrd-style guitar outro. Of the style change, vocalist Pepper Keenan said, "The way we were thinking back then, the hardcore thing was getting so stale. It seemed that everyone was doin' the same fuckin' thing, and for us to write the song 'The Albatross' felt more punk rock than anything anyone was doing at the time. People were pissed off at us. But it finally felt real again."

== Musical style ==
In his review of the album, AllMusic reviewer Eduardo Rivadavia referred to the song as a "slower, groovier number".

== Track listing ==
Maxi single

No.	Title	Length
1.	"Albatross" (radio edit)	4:19
2.	"Shake Like You (Bulldozer Mix)"	4:29
3.	"Fuel (Jam-Box Tape)"	2:42

European single

No.	Title	Length
1.	"Albatross" (radio edit)	4:19
2.	"Shake Like You (Bulldozer Mix)"	4:29

12" single

Side A
No.	Title	Length
1.	"Albatross" (radio edit)	4:19

Side B
No.	Title	Length
1.	"Shake Like You (Bulldozer Mix)"	4:29
2.	"Fuel (Jam-Box Tape)"	2:42

American promo single

No.	Title	Length
1.	"Albatross" (album version)	5:12
2.	"Albatross" (radio edit)	4:19

== Use in other media ==
"Albatross" was featured in the 2009 video game Guitar Hero: Metallica.
