= Blind (Corrosion of Conformity album) =

Studio album by Corrosion of Conformity
- Released: November 5, 1991
- Recorded: 1991
- Studios: Baby Monster Studios, New York City
- Genres: Sludge metal; stoner metal; thrash metal
- Length: 55:30
- Label: Relativity
- Producers: John Custer; Corrosion of Conformity

Corrosion of Conformity chronology
| Technocracy (1987) | Blind (1991) | Deliverance (1994) |

Singles from Blind
- 1. "Dance of the Dead" Released: 1991; 2. "Vote with a Bullet" Released: 1992

Blind is the third studio album by American heavy metal band Corrosion of Conformity, released on November 5, 1991 via Relativity Records. The album saw the band change their crossover thrash sound of the 1980s to a more straightforward metal sound.

Blind was Corrosion of Conformity's first album in six years since the release of Animosity, and their first release with rhythm guitarist Pepper Keenan as well as their only recording with Karl Agell on vocals, and until 2026's Good God / Baad Man, the only one on which original bassist Mike Dean does not appear. Phil Swisher instead took his place – his sole appearance on a C.O.C. album.

The album was re-released through Columbia Records in 1995, featuring three additional songs and remastering by Bob Ludwig.

== Reception ==
Professional ratings
Review scores
| Source | Rating |
|---|---|
| AllMusic | 4.5/5 stars |
| Classic Rock | 3/5 stars |
| Collector's Guide to Heavy Metal | 9/10 |
| Encyclopedia of Popular Music | 4/5 stars |
| Entertainment Weekly | A |
| Hit Parader | 4/5 stars |
| Kerrang! | 5/5 stars |
| Record Collector | 4/5 stars |
| Rock Hard | 8/10 |
| Select | 1/5 stars |

In The Village Voice, Chuck Eddy grouped Corrosion of Conformity alongside Die Kreuzen and Prong as groups eschewing "ordinary heavy metal" and instead "[wanting] to be jazz bands or something", citing their use of texture, amorphous lyrics, using the voice as an instrument, disruptive song structures and abstract cover art (noting the "little paper-doll-like string of pinheads" on the Blind cover). Eddy writes that, on Blind the band "slime out fusion-rooted sludge with tummyache vocals, sing one song through a megaphone, and (as jazz tradition dictates) they're 'political' 'cause they say they are", though he found the lyrics indecipherable. He praised the sadness in the mellow guitar interludes from "Shallow Ground" and "Echoes to the Wall", but felt the band "don't switch gears as fast as they did in 1987, and their only really cool attribute is how on the back cover one guy looks exactly like Sebastian Bach and another like Axl Rose."

Marilla Blellock of Select felt that Corrosion of Conformity continued to lack "Skylcad's imagination, Metallica's songs and Slayer's ability to offend", and dismissed the album as "dull thrash." More favorably, Janiss Garza from Entertainment Weekly observed that, with Blind, the band have "taken metalcore to yet another new level", citing how "Damned for All Time" marries a 1960s acid rock groove with "an electrified tribal pound", as well as the "slow, nightmarish crawl" of "Echoes in the Well". "Smart, political, and intensely moody," Garza concluded, "C.O.C. once again is a driving force on the outer limits of heavy metal, where major bands like Metallica originally made their mark."

Blind received a positive review from AllMusic writer Eduardo Rivadavia, who gave the album four-and-a-half stars out of five, and stated, "By the time they released 1991's Blind, crossover pioneers Corrosion of Conformity were pursuing a decidedly metallic direction, but this in no way compromised their punk ethic, overtly political lyrical themes, and incredible sonic aggression." Rivadavia described "Damned for All Time" and "Mine Are the Eyes of God" as "excellent tracks" that "manage to be both utterly heavy and surprisingly catchy", while he describes "Dance of the Dead" and "Echoes in the Well" as "straightforward metal as C.O.C. gets." He also described Blind as "simply one of the most important heavy rock albums of the decade."

Blind was the album that broke Corrosion of Conformity into the heavy metal mainstream, peaking at number 24 on the Heatseekers chart. One of the singles, "Dance of the Dead", saw regular radio play on popular stations such as Los Angeles's KNAC. "Vote with a Bullet" was also released as a single.

== Track listing ==
All lyrics are written by Karl Agell and Pepper Keenan, except "Great Purification" by Phil Swisher; all music is composed by Corrosion of Conformity. "Future Now", lyrics and music by Rob Tyner.

| No. | Title | Length |
|---|---|---|
| 1. | "These Shrouded Temples..." (instrumental) | 2:37 |
| 2. | "Damned for All Time" | 5:52 |
| 3. | "Dance of the Dead" | 4:29 |
| 4. | "Buried" | 5:18 |
| 5. | "Break the Circle" | 4:10 |
| 6. | "Painted Smiling Face" | 4:24 |
| 7. | "Mine Are the Eyes of God" | 5:00 |
| 8. | "Shallow Ground" (instrumental) | 2:21 |
| 9. | "Vote with a Bullet" | 3:27 |
| 10. | "Great Purification" | 4:33 |
| 11. | "White Noise" | 4:19 |
| 12. | "Echoes in the Well" | 5:33 |
| 13. | "...Remain" (instrumental) | 0:28 |
| Total length: | | 55:30 |

Bonus tracks 1995
| No. | Title | Length |
|---|---|---|
| 14. | "Condition A/Condition B" (instrumental/spoken word) | 1:09 |
| 15. | "Future Now" (MC5 cover) | 2:49 |
| 16. | "Jim Beam and the Coon Ass" | 2:35 |

== Personnel ==
Corrosion of Conformity

- Karl Agell – lead vocals, saxophone on "Jim Beam and the Coon Ass"
- Woody Weatherman – lead guitar
- Pepper Keenan – rhythm guitar, backing vocals, lead vocals on "Vote with a Bullet" and "Jim Beam and the Coon Ass"
- Phil Swisher – bass
- Reed Mullin – drums, backing vocals, saxophone case on "Jim Beam and the Coon Ass"

Production

- Corrosion of Conformity – producer
- John Custer – producer, mixing, guitar on "Jim Beam and the Coon Ass"
- Steve McAllister – engineer, co-producer
- Garris Shipon – mixing
- Tony Dawsey – mastering

Artwork and photography

- Bill Sienkiewicz – artwork
- Danny Clinch – band photo
- David Bett – art direction
