= Megalodon (EP) =

EP by Corrosion of Conformity
- Released: November 13, 2012
- Genres: Stoner rock, Southern metal
- Length: 18:44
- Label: Scion Audio Visual
- Producers: John Custer and Corrosion of Conformity

Corrosion of Conformity chronology
Corrosion of Conformity (2012)	Megalodon (2012)	IX (2014)

Megalodon is the fourth EP by American band Corrosion of Conformity.

== Track listing ==
All songs are written by Mike Dean, Woody Weatherman and Reed Mullin.

No.	Title	Length
1.	"Feed On"	04:54
2.	"Priest Brains"	02:57
3.	"The Megalodon"	04:02
4.	"Strong Medicine Too Late"	04:07
5.	"The Vulture"	02:44
Total length:		18:44

== Personnel ==
=== Corrosion of Conformity ===
- Mike Dean – vocals, bass
- Woody Weatherman – guitar, backing vocals
- Reed Mullin – drums, backing vocals, lead vocals on "The Megalodon"

=== Production ===
- produced by John Custer and Corrosion of Conformity

=== Artwork ===
- cover ilustration by Arik Roper
