= Good God / Baad Man =

Studio album by Corrosion of Conformity
- Released: April 3, 2026
- Recorded: March–August 2025
- Genres: Stoner metal, southern metal
- Length: 66:46
- Label: Nuclear Blast
- Producer: Warren Riker

Corrosion of Conformity chronology
No Cross No Crown (2018)	Good God / Baad Man (2026)

Singles from Good God / Baad Man
- 1. "Gimme Some Moore" Released: February 10, 2026; 2. "You or Me" Released: March 10, 2026; 3. "Asleep on the Killing Floor" Released: April 3, 2026; 4. "Baad Man" Released: July 6, 2026

Good God / Baad Man is the eleventh studio album by the American heavy metal band Corrosion of Conformity, released on April 3, 2026. This was their first studio album in eight years, following No Cross No Crown (2018), marking the longest gap between studio albums in the band's career. And its only in 21 years since In the Arms of God (2005) to feature drummer Stanton Moore. It is also Corrosion of Conformity's first studio album with bassist Bobby Landgraf, who replaced Mike Dean following the latter's departure in 2024.

Good God / Baad Man marked the first Corrosion of Conformity release since their 1987 EP Technocracy to not be produced by John Custer; the band instead working with producer Warren Riker, known for his work with Pepper Keenan's other band Down.

== Track listing ==
All lyrics are written by Pepper Keenan.

Disc 1 – Good God
No.	Title	Music	Length
1.	"Good God? / Final Dawn"	Pepper Keenan; Woody Weatherman; Stanton Moore	4:09
2.	"You or Me"	Keenan; Weatherman; Moore	5:28
3.	"Gimme Some Moore"	Keenan; Weatherman; Moore; Bobby Landgraf	4:00
4.	"The Handler"	Keenan; Weatherman; Moore	5:13
5.	"Bedouin's Hand"	Keenan; Landgraf; Moore	3:21
6.	"Run for Your Life"	Keenan; Weatherman; Moore	9:12

Disc 2 – Baad Man
No.	Title	Music	Length
7.	"Baad Man"	Keenan; Weatherman	4:24
8.	"Lose Yourself"	Keenan; Weatherman; Moore; Landgraf	3:30
9.	"Mandra Sonos"	Keenan; Landgraf	1:17
10.	"Asleep on the Killing Floor"	Keenan; Weatherman; Moore; Landgraf	4:08
11.	"Handcuff County"	Keenan; Weatherman; Moore; Landgraf	5:43
12.	"Swallowing the Anchor"	Keenan; Weatherman; Moore	6:22
13.	"Brickman"	Keenan; Weatherman	3:21
14.	"Forever Amplified"	Keenan; Weatherman; Moore	6:38
Total length:			66:46

== Personnel ==
=== Corrosion of Conformity ===
- Pepper Keenan – vocals, rhythm guitar
- Woody Weatherman – lead guitar
- Bobby Landgraf – bass
- Stanton Moore – drums

=== Special guests ===
- Al Jourgensen and Monte Pittman - backing vocals on "Gimme Some Moore"
- Jason Everman - spoken word on "Run for Your Life"
- Anjelika "Jelly" Joseph - backing vocals on "Forever Amplified"

=== Production ===
- produced, engineered and mixed by Warren Riker
- mastered by Ted Jensen

=== Artwork ===
- painting by Scott Guion
- band photography by Danin Drahos

== Charts ==
Chart performance for Good God / Baad Man
Chart (2026)	Peak position
Belgian Albums (Ultratop Wallonia)	118
French Physical Albums (SNEP)	57
French Rock & Metal Albums (SNEP)	14
Scottish Albums (Official Charts)	16
Swiss Albums (Schweizer Hitparade)	66
UK Albums Sales (OCC)	12
UK Independent Albums (Official Charts)	6
UK Rock & Metal Albums (Official Charts)	3
US Indie Store Album Sales (Billboard)	12
US Top Album Sales (Billboard)	23
