= Corrosion of Conformity (album) =

Studio album by Corrosion of Conformity
- Released: February 28, 2012
- Recorded: March–November 2011 at Studio 606, Northridge, California
- Genres: Stoner rock; sludge metal
- Length: 42:43
- Label: Candlelight
- Producers: Corrosion of Conformity, John Custer

Corrosion of Conformity chronology
In the Arms of God (2005)	Corrosion of Conformity (2012)	Megalodon (2012)

Singles from Corrosion of Conformity
- 1. "The Doom" Released: January 17, 2012

Professional ratings
Aggregate scores
Source	Rating
Metacritic	73/100
Review scores
Source	Rating
AllMusic	4/5 stars
Blabbermouth.net	7.5/10
Pitchfork	7.6/10.0
PopMatters	8/10
Spin	6/10
Sputnikmusic	4.0/5

Corrosion of Conformity is the eighth studio album by American heavy metal band Corrosion of Conformity, released on February 28, 2012 by Candlelight Records. It was the band's first album since In the Arms of God (2005), their longest gap between studio albums at the time. It is also their first album with Reed Mullin on drums since 2000's America's Volume Dealer and the first to not feature Pepper Keenan on vocals or guitar since 1987's Technocracy.

== Track listing ==
No.	Title	Lyrics	Music	Length
1.	"Psychic Vampire"	Mike Dean	Dean; Woody Weatherman; Reed Mullin	4:27
2.	"River of Stone"	Dean	Dean; Weatherman; Mullin	6:09
3.	"Leeches"	Mullin	Mullin; Dean; Weatherman	2:14
4.	"El Lamento de las Cabras"	instrumental	Weatherman; Mullin; Dean	2:58
5.	"Your Tomorrow"	Dean	Dean; Weatherman; Mullin	4:04
6.	"The Doom"	Dean	Dean; Weatherman; Mullin	4:49
7.	"The Moneychangers"	Dean	Dean; Weatherman; Mullin	4:11
8.	"Weaving Spiders Come Not Here"	Mullin; Dean	Mullin; Weatherman; Dean; Stansbury	4:04
9.	"What You Despise Is What You've Become"	Mullin	Mullin; Weatherman; Dean; Quinn	3:43
10.	"Rat City"	Dean	Dean; Weatherman; Mullin	2:23
11.	"Time of Trails"	Dean	Weatherman; Mullin; Dean	3:41
Total length:				42:43

Deluxe and limited edition bonus tracks
No.	Title	Lyrics	Music	Length
12.	"Canyon Man"	Dean	Dean; Weatherman; Mullin	5:01
13.	"The Same Way"	Dean	Dean; Weatherman; Mullin	2:12
Total length:				49:55

The song "Your Tomorrow" is a re-recorded version of the song originally released on vinyl single in 2010.

== Personnel ==
Personnel taken from Corrosion of Conformity CD booklet.

Corrosion of Conformity

- Woody Weatherman – guitars, vocals
- Mike Dean – bass, vocals
- Reed Mullin – drums, vocals on 3, 8, 9

Production

- John Custer – production
- Corrosion of Conformity – production
- John Lousteau – engineering, mixing
- Mike Dean – additional recording
- Dave Harris – mastering
- Jodi Donkel – photos
- Seldon Hunt – cover illustration
- Adrian Wear – layout
