= Wiseblood (Corrosion of Conformity album) =

Studio album by Corrosion of Conformity
- Released: October 15, 1996
- Recorded: 1995–1996
- Genres: Stoner rock; southern metal
- Length: 57:49
- Label: Columbia
- Producer: John Custer

Corrosion of Conformity chronology
Deliverance (1994)	Wiseblood (1996)	America's Volume Dealer (2000)

Wiseblood is the fifth studio album by American heavy metal band Corrosion of Conformity. It was released on October 15, 1996 by Columbia Records, the band's second and final album for the label. Its name comes from the novel Wise Blood, written by Southern Gothic author Flannery O'Connor. Metallica's lead vocalist James Hetfield provides backing vocals on "Man or Ash". The song "Drowning in a Daydream" was nominated for Best Metal Performance at the 40th Grammy Awards ceremony (which went to Tool for "Ænema"). The album had sold 130,000 copies by 1999, selling less than Blind and Deliverance.

== Reception ==
Professional ratings
Review scores
Source	Rating
AllMusic	4/5 stars
Collector's Guide to Heavy Metal	9/10
Encyclopedia of Popular Music	3/5 stars
Entertainment Weekly	A−

Wiseblood received a mixed-to-positive review from AllMusic writer Stephen Thomas Erlewine, who gave the album four stars out of five. He described Wiseblood as the "closest Corrosion of Conformity have gotten to old-school heavy metal, yet their fondness for industrial soundbites and thrash-metal keeps the group sounding contemporary." However, Erlewine stated that it "doesn't have half the hooks of its predecessor, which means it sounds great while its playing, but it disappears into the abyss once it's finished."

Despite receiving mixed reviews, Wiseblood peaked at number 104 on the Billboard 200; this was the band's highest position on the chart for 22 years, until No Cross No Crown, which peaked at number 67. It also peaked at number two on the Heatseekers chart. However, it only spent two weeks on the US Billboard 200.

One of the album's singles, "Drowning in a Daydream", peaked at number 27 on the Mainstream Rock chart.

== Track listing ==
All lyrics are written by Pepper Keenan except "The Land of Free Disease" co-written with Reed Mullin.

No.	Title	Writer(s)	Length
1.	"King of the Rotten"	Pepper Keenan	3:14
2.	"Long Whip / Big America"	Keenan, Reed Mullin, Woody Weatherman	4:52
3.	"Wiseblood"	Keenan, Mullin	3:01
4.	"Goodbye Windows"	Weatherman	5:41
5.	"Born Again for the Last Time"	Keenan, Mullin	4:39
6.	"Drowning in a Daydream"	Keenan, Mullin, Weatherman, Mike Dean	4:22
7.	"The Snake Has No Head"	Dean	4:13
8.	"The Door"	Keenan, Mullin	3:28
9.	"Man or Ash" (featuring James Hetfield)	Keenan, Dean	5:13
10.	"Redemption City"	Keenan, John Custer	4:51
11.	"Wishbone (Some Tomorrow)"	Keenan	3:59
12.	"Fuel"	Keenan, Mullin	2:39
13.	"Bottom Feeder (El Que Come Abajo)" (instrumental)	Keenan, Mullin, Weatherman, Dean	7:51
Total length:			57:49

Japanese bonus track

No.	Title	Writer(s)	Length
14.	"The Land of Free Disease"	Weatherman, Phil Swisher, Mullin	4:20
Total length:			62:09

B-Sides

- The "Drowning in a Daydream" maxi-single includes the instrumental track "Bottom Feeder (El Que Come Abajo)", the Japanese bonus track "The Land of Free Disease" and a cover of Creedence Clearwater Revival's "Fortunate Son".
- The "King of the Rotten" vinyl single includes an alternative version of "Fuel" titled "Fuel (Jam-Box Tape)" and a cover of Black Flag's "I've Heard It Before".

== Personnel ==
Corrosion of Conformity

- Pepper Keenan – vocals, rhythm guitar
- Woody Weatherman – lead guitar
- Mike Dean – bass
- Reed Mullin – drums

Additional personnel

- James Hetfield – backing vocals on "Man or Ash" (uncredited)

== Chart positions ==
=== Album ===
Billboard (United States)

Year	Chart	Position
1996	Billboard 200	104

=== Singles ===
Year	Single	Chart	Position
1996	"Drowning in a Daydream"	Mainstream Rock Tracks	27
