= Live Volume =

Live album by Corrosion of Conformity
- Released: August 7, 2001
- Recorded: April 20, 2001
- Venues: Harpos Concert Theatre, Detroit, Michigan
- Genres: Stoner rock, sludge metal, southern metal
- Length: 76:52
- Label: Sanctuary
- Producers: John Custer, Corrosion of Conformity

Corrosion of Conformity chronology
America's Volume Dealer (2000)	Live Volume (2001)	In the Arms of God (2005)

Professional ratings
Review scores
Source	Rating
AllMusic	4/5 stars
Collector's Guide to Heavy Metal	7/10
Encyclopedia of Popular Music	2/5 stars

Live Volume is a live album by American heavy metal band Corrosion of Conformity, released on August 7, 2001. It was recorded on April 20, 2001, at the Harpos Concert Theatre in Detroit, Michigan.

== Track listing ==
1. These Shrouded Temples (instrumental) – 4:34
2. Diablo Blvd. - 3:53
3. Señor Limpio – 4:53
4. King of the Rotten – 3:19
5. Wiseblood – 3:38
6. Who's Got the Fire – 3:45
7. Albatross – 5:59
8. My Grain – 6:40
9. Congratulations Song – 3:43
10. 13 Angels/7 Days – 8:11
11. Vote with a Bullet – 3:46
12. Zippo – 4:54
13. Long Whip/Big America – 5:32
14. Shelter – 5:33
15. Clean My Wounds – 8:41

== Credits ==
- Pepper Keenan – lead vocals, rhythm guitar
- Woody Weatherman – lead guitar, backing vocals
- Mike Dean – bass, keyboards, backing vocals
- Jimmy Bower – drums, percussion
