= IX (Corrosion of Conformity album) =

Studio album by Corrosion of Conformity
- Released: July 1, 2014
- Genres: Stoner rock, sludge metal
- Length: 41:55
- Label: Candlelight
- Producers: Corrosion of Conformity, John Custer

Corrosion of Conformity chronology
Megalodon (2012)	IX (2014)	No Cross No Crown (2018)

Professional ratings
Review scores
Source	Rating
AllMusic	3.5/5 stars
Blabbermouth.net	8/10
Loudwire	4/5 stars
Metal Forces	7.5/10

IX is the ninth studio album by the American heavy metal band Corrosion of Conformity, released on July 1, 2014, by Candlelight Records.

== Track listing ==
All tracks are written by Woody Weatherman, Mike Dean and Reed Mullin, except track 9 co-written with Pepper Keenan.

No.	Title	Length
1.	"Brand New Sleep"	5:51
2.	"Elphyn"	4:55
3.	"Kill Denmark Vesey"	2:04
4.	"The Nectar"	4:12
5.	"Interlude"	0:54
6.	"On Your Way"	3:38
7.	"Trucker"	5:30
8.	"The Hanged Man"	4:16
9.	"Tarquinius Superbus"	5:31
10.	"Who You Need to Blame"	3:44
11.	"The Nectar Revised"	1:20
Total length:		41:55

== Personnel ==
Corrosion of Conformity

- Woody Weatherman – guitars, vocals
- Mike Dean – bass, vocals
- Reed Mullin – drums, vocals

Production

- Brad Boatright – mastering
- John Custer – mixing
- Mike Dean – engineering, mixing
