= Karl Agell =

Canadian heavy metal singer (born 1966)

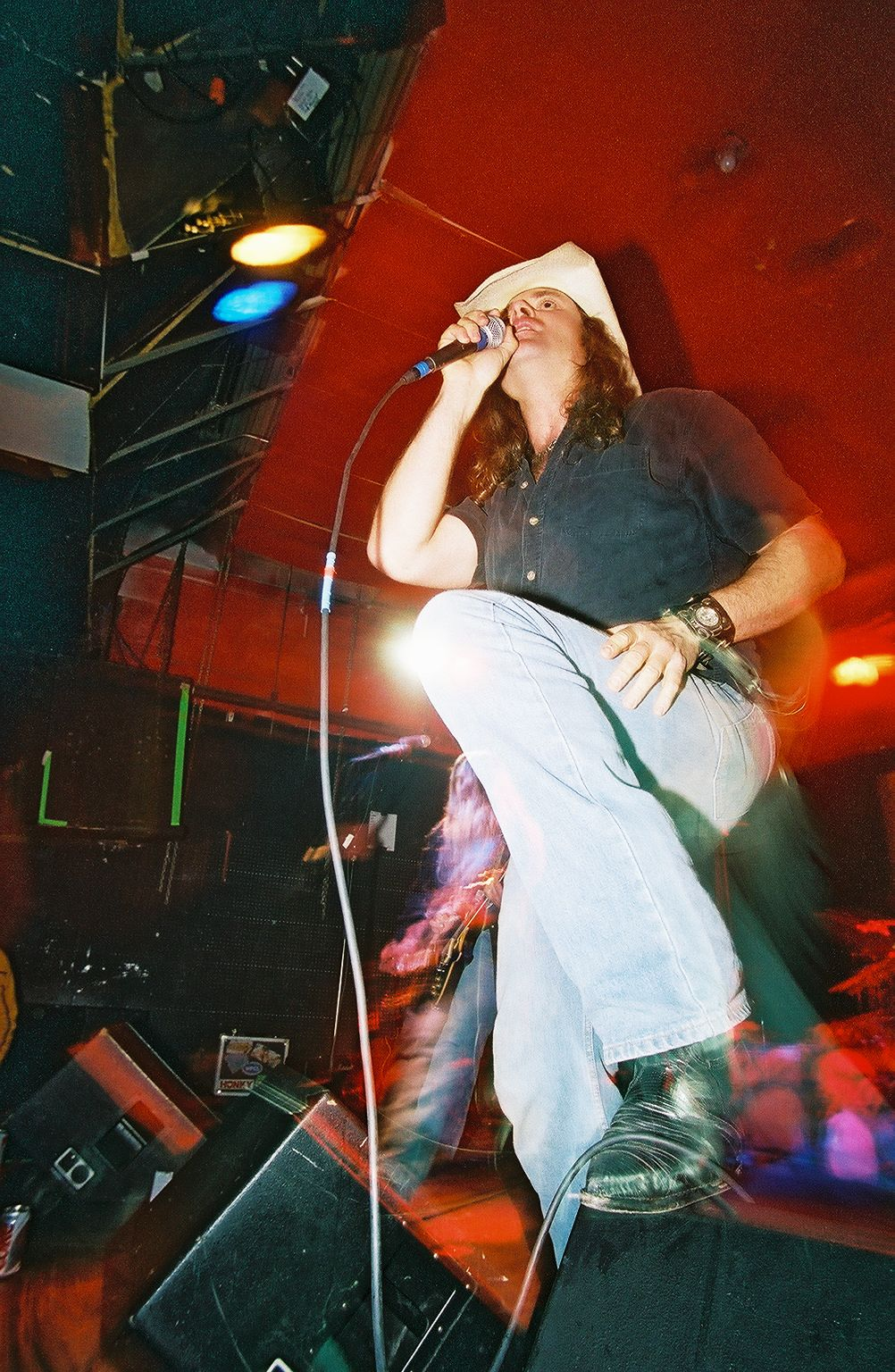
- Agell performing with Leadfoot in 2003

Background information
- Born: August 14, 1966 (age 60); Montreal, Quebec, Canada
- Genres: Heavy metal, sludge metal, stoner rock
- Occupation: Singer
- Years active: 1989–present
- Member of: Leadfoot, Blind, Legions of Doom
- Formerly of: Corrosion of Conformity, Seizure

Karl Agell (born August 14, 1966) is a Canadian heavy metal singer. He is best known for being the fifth recording lead vocalist of Corrosion of Conformity from 1989 until his departure in 1993, as well as being a founding member of Leadfoot. He has also formed a project called Blind.

== Early life ==
Agell was born on August 14, 1966, in Montreal, Quebec, to Swedish parents.

== Career ==
=== Seizure ===
Agell was the first vocalist for the Connecticut punk/hardcore band Seizure in the mid-1980s with John Munera (bass), Jeff Coleman (drums) and Sex Bomb (guitar) .

=== Corrosion of Conformity ===
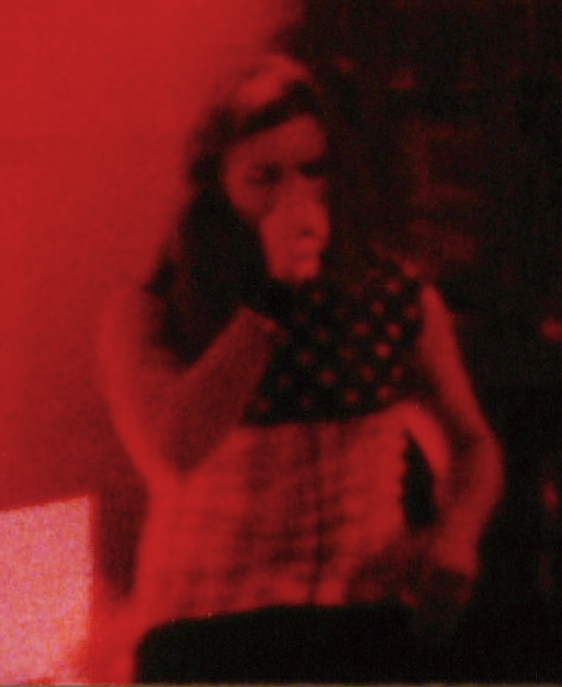
Agell performing with Corrosion of Conformity in New York on the Blind tour

Agell joined Corrosion of Conformity in late 1989. The band released their third album called Blind with Agell as the lead vocalist. In 1993, Agell and Phil Swisher left the band without recording the fourth album (before Swisher was replaced by original C.O.C. bassist Mike Dean), before Pepper Keenan took over on lead vocals and rhythm guitar.

=== Leadfoot ===
In 1995, Agell and Phil Swisher formed Leadfoot. In 1997, the band released their debut album, Bring It On. In 1999, Leadfoot released their second album, Take a Look. In 2003, Leadfoot released their third album entitled We Drink for Free. In 2004, Swisher left the band and formed two hardcore punk bands, UNICEF and Blood Bath.

== Discography ==
=== Seizure ===
Date of release	Title	Label
1986	All Hail the Fucking System	Incas

=== Corrosion of Conformity ===
Date of release	Title	Label
January 17, 1991	Blind	Relativity Records

=== Leadfoot albums ===
Date of release	Title	Label
1997	Bring It On	The Music Cartel
1999	Take a Look	The Music Cartel
2003	We Drink for Free	The Abstract Music
