= Snake Nation =

American rock band

- Origin: Raleigh, North Carolina, U.S.
- Genres: Hardcore punk, heavy metal, stoner rock
- Years active: 1989
- Label: Caroline Records
- Members: Mike Dean (bass/vocals); Woody Weatherman (guitar/vocals); Brian Walsby (drums/vocals)

Snake Nation was an American rock band consisting of Corrosion of Conformity members Mike Dean and Woody Weatherman, along with comic artist Brian Walsby on drums. While COC was on hiatus in 1989, Snake Nation released one self-titled album via Caroline Records. It features a cover of Blue Cheer's song "Babylon".

The music was a blend of the aggressive hardcore of early-stage COC, with a slower, heavier Black Sabbath influence.

The band played three shows before COC reformed with a new lineup.

== Discography ==
- Snake Nation LP – Caroline Records – 1989
