= No Cross No Crown (album) =

Studio album by Corrosion of Conformity
- Released: January 12, 2018
- Genres: Stoner metal; southern metal; sludge metal
- Length: 58:01
- Label: Nuclear Blast
- Producers: Corrosion of Conformity; John Custer

Corrosion of Conformity chronology
IX (2014)	No Cross No Crown (2018)	Good God / Baad Man (2026)

Professional ratings
Aggregate scores
Source	Rating
Metacritic	77/100
Review scores
Source	Rating
AllMusic	3.5/5 stars
Blabbermouth.net	8.5/10
Consequence of Sound	C+
Exclaim!	6/10
Kerrang!	4/5 stars
Mojo	4/5 stars
Punknews.org	4/5 stars
The Wire	4/5 stars

No Cross No Crown is the tenth studio album by American heavy metal band Corrosion of Conformity, released on January 12, 2018 by Nuclear Blast. This is the only album to feature the "classic" lineup of Woody Weatherman, Mike Dean, Reed Mullin and Pepper Keenan since America's Volume Dealer (2000). It is also the last album to feature Mullin (who died in early 2020) and Dean (who exited the band in 2024).

== Accolades ==
Publication	Accolade	Rank	Ref.
Decibel	Decibel's Top 40 Albums of 2018	31	

== Track listing ==
All music composed by Corrosion of Conformity, all lyrics by Pepper Keenan except "A Quest to Believe (A Call to the Void)" by Pepper Keenan/Mike Dean. "Son and Daughter" music and lyrics by Brian May.

No.	Title	Length
1.	"Novus Deus" (instrumental)	1:28
2.	"The Luddite"	4:39
3.	"Cast the First Stone"	3:43
4.	"No Cross" (instrumental)	1:18
5.	"Wolf Named Crow"	5:12
6.	"Little Man"	4:31
7.	"Matre's Diem" (instrumental)	1:26
8.	"Forgive Me"	4:06
9.	"Nothing Left to Say"	6:22
10.	"Sacred Isolation" (instrumental)	1:22
11.	"Old Disaster"	4:44
12.	"E.L.M."	4:02
13.	"No Cross No Crown"	3:55
14.	"A Quest to Believe (A Call to the Void)"	6:20
15.	"Son and Daughter" (Queen cover)	4:53
Total length:		58:01

== Personnel ==
Corrosion of Conformity

- Pepper Keenan – lead vocals, rhythm guitar
- Woody Weatherman – lead guitar, backing vocals
- Mike Dean – bass, backing vocals
- Reed Mullin – drums, backing vocals

Production

- John Custer – production

== Charts ==
Chart (2018)	Peak position
Australian Albums (ARIA)	95
Belgian Albums (Ultratop Wallonia)	134
Spanish Albums (Promusicae)	94
Swiss Albums (Schweizer Hitparade)	98
UK Albums (Official Charts)	87
US Billboard 200	67
