= Corrosion of Conformity =

American heavy metal band

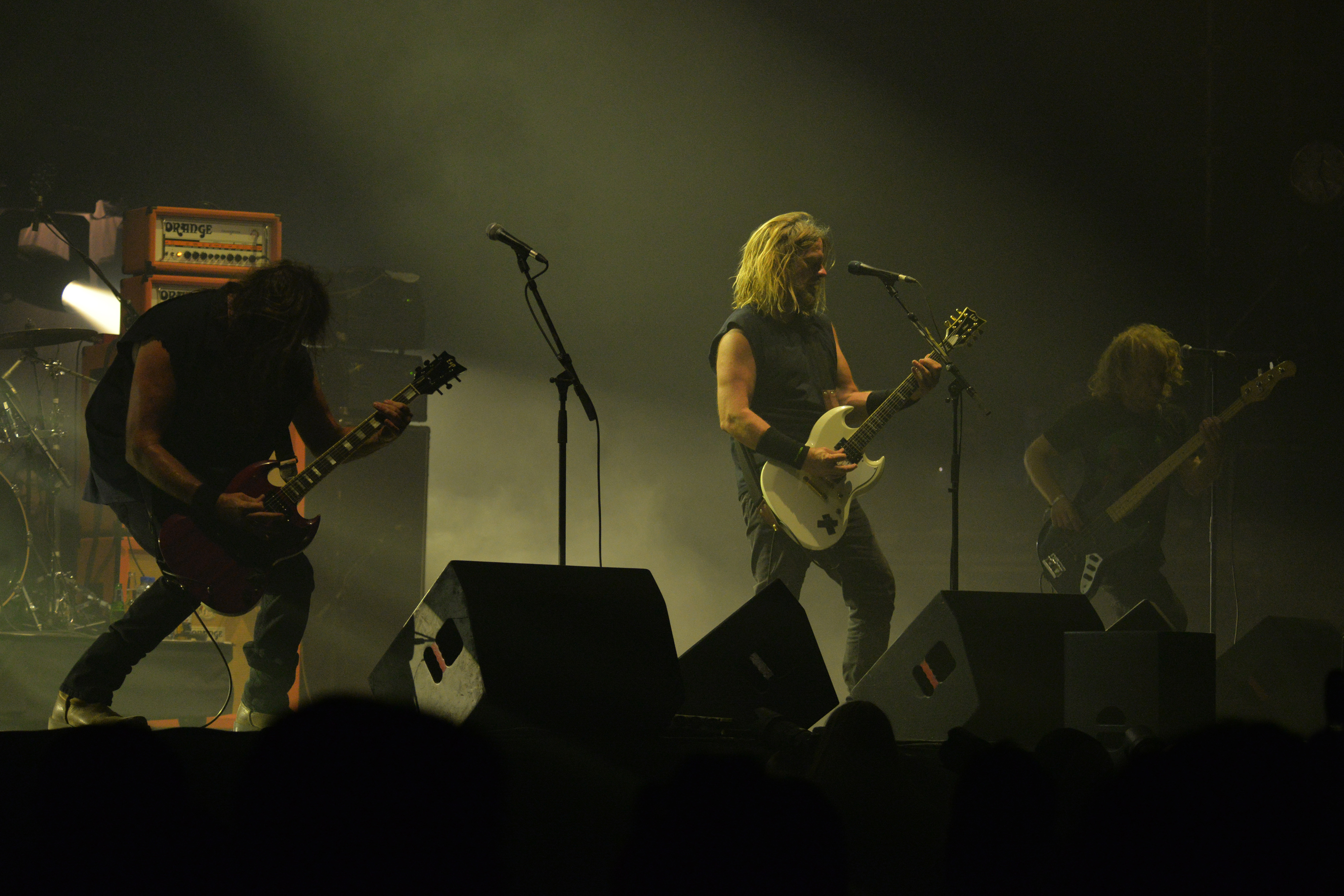
- Corrosion of Conformity performing in 2018

Background information
- Also known as: C.O.C.
- Origin: Raleigh, North Carolina, U.S.
- Genres: Stoner metal; Southern metal; sludge metal; hardcore punk (early)
- Years active: 1982–1987; 1989–2006; 2010–present
- Labels: Sanctuary; Candlelight; Columbia; Metal Blade; Relativity; Caroline; Southern Lord; Nuclear Blast
- Members: Woody Weatherman; Pepper Keenan; Bobby Landgraf; Nick Shabatura
- Past members: Mike Dean; Reed Mullin; Karl Agell; Phil Swisher; Simon Bob Sinister; Eric Eycke; Robert Stewart; Benji Shelton; Jimmy Bower; Jason Patterson; Jon Green; Stanton Moore

Corrosion of Conformity (often abbreviated as C.O.C.) is an American heavy metal band from Raleigh, North Carolina, formed in 1982. The band has undergone multiple lineup changes throughout its existence, with lead guitarist Woody Weatherman as the sole constant member. Weatherman, founding bassist Mike Dean, founding drummer Reed Mullin and vocalist/rhythm guitarist Pepper Keenan (who joined the band in 1989) are widely regarded as its "classic" lineup. After a hiatus in 2006, Corrosion of Conformity returned in 2010 without Keenan, who had been busy touring and recording with Down, but announced their reunion with him in December 2014. More lineup changes have happened since then, with John Green replacing Mullin after his death in 2020 and Dean (who first left Corrosion of Conformity in 1987 but rejoined in 1993) departing from the band once again in 2024.

They started as a hardcore punk band but later moved towards a slower and blues-tinged heavy metal sound. To date, the band has released eleven studio albums, four EPs, one compilation, and one live album. Their first three studio albums―Eye for an Eye (1984), Animosity (1985) and Blind (1991)―attracted the attention of Columbia Records, who signed the band in 1993. Corrosion of Conformity found success with the release of their 1994 fourth studio album, Deliverance, which peaked at number 155 on the Billboard 200 and spawned the hits "Albatross" and "Clean My Wounds". Their 1996 follow-up Wiseblood was also successful, and at the time, it was the band's highest-charting album in the United States, peaking at number 104 on the Billboard 200. Their 2018 album, No Cross No Crown, was the band's first to enter the top 100 on the Billboard 200, where it peaked at number 67. Corrosion of Conformity's eleventh and latest studio album, Good God / Baad Man, was released in 2026.

== History ==
=== Early years, Eye for an Eye and Animosity (1982–1988) ===
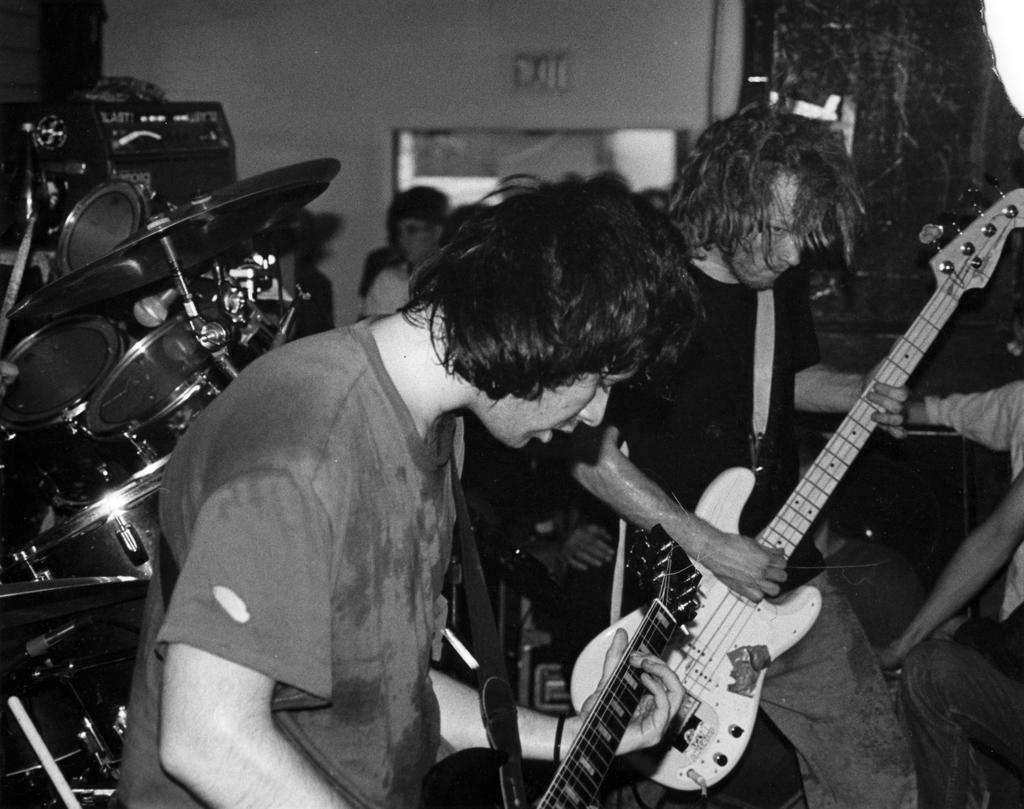
Corrosion of Conformity as a trio in 1986 with Mike Dean as lead vocalist

Corrosion of Conformity was formed in Raleigh, North Carolina, by bassist and vocalist Mike Dean, guitarist Woody Weatherman, drummer Reed Mullin, and singer Benji Shelton in 1982. They were influenced by heavy metal bands like Black Sabbath, Iron Maiden, Scorpions, and Judas Priest, as well as by hardcore groups like Black Flag, Bad Brains, the Circle Jerks, Minor Threat, Discharge, the Germs, and "a lot of older D.C. bands."

They released tracks on the No Core cassette tape compilation on the label of the same name along with other North Carolina punk bands in 1982 as well as on the Why Are We Here? 7" compilation in 1983, also on the No Core label. Shelton quit the band in 1983 and COC first recruited Robert Stewart to sing but he stayed only for about a month, so they recruited Eric Eycke from fellow Raleigh band Colcor to be the new singer. They recorded their first album, Eye for an Eye, with Eycke.

Their hardcore punk-oriented 20-track debut Eye for an Eye—the only album featuring Eycke—was initially released in 1984 and later re-released by Caroline Records in 1989. Soon after, Eycke left the band and COC continued as a three-piece with Dean and Mullin sharing vocal duties on 1985's follow-up Animosity, released through the Metal Blade Records imprint Death Records. Although it was well-received upon release and is now seen as an important album in the crossover thrash genre, Metal Blade did little to promote the album, prompting Dean to quit the band in 1987.

COC recruited Simon Bob Sinister after the breakup of their fellow Carolina band and Death Records labelmates Ugly Americans. The band's 1987 release, the Technocracy EP, featured the hectic crossover thrash musicianship of COC with a cleaner vocal style than they had in the past. The band issued the EP in order to fulfil their contractual obligations with Metal Blade. Bob soon left Corrosion of Conformity to return to Ugly Americans, after which the band broke up without notice for two years. Mullin said that because Metal Blade had charged the band for Technocracy as if it were a full-length album, "[the band] lost a lot of control, we lost sight [and] we lost our track. We were finished."

=== Blind, Deliverance and Wiseblood (1989–1998) ===
In 1989, Weatherman and Reed reformed Corrosion of Conformity and began searching for a new vocalist, even posting a classified in Flipside Fanzine for a singer similar in sound to "James Hetfield or Ozzy Osbourne" to go with their new metal sound. Karl Agell was recruited on vocals, Phil Swisher on bass and Pepper Keenan as a second guitarist. Around this time, Caroline Records released some old tracks with Mike Dean singing during this time with the aptly named Six Songs with Mike Singing EP. Dean also participated in Snake Nation.

The new lineup released 1991's Blind. Blind was the first COC album to receive mainstream attention. The video for "Vote with a Bullet" (the only song with Keenan on vocals on the album) received airplay on MTV and the album cracked the Billboard Heatseekers chart in early 1992. By 2011, the album had sold over 250,000 copies in the United States.

In 1993, Agell and Swisher left the band and formed the band Leadfoot, Dean returned and Keenan took over lead vocals.

The band began working on their next album for Relativity, Deliverance. During this time however, session demos for the album found their way into the hands of Columbia Records. The label then offered to buy the band's contract from Relativity; when the label refused, Sony/Columbia bought Relativity, turned it into a distribution label, and transferred the band's contract over to Columbia.

Deliverance saw the band also incorporating stoner and southern rock influences, which they also carried onto the following albums. In 1994, their song Big Problems was featured on the Clerks soundtrack. The song "Clean My Wounds" was featured in the anime movie Tekken: The Motion Picture.

Deliverance was the band's biggest selling album. This was mainly due to the singles "Albatross" and "Clean My Wounds" becoming Top 20 hits on rock radio and the album managed to spend almost four months on the Billboard 200, peaking at No. 155. On the Heatseekers chart, it peaked at No. 5 and lasted almost a year on that particular chart.

Wiseblood was released in October 1996. Despite producing a Top 30 radio hit with "Drowning in a Daydream" and a worldwide tour with Metallica, the album failed to match the sales set by the previous album, selling over 140,000 copies by 2002. "Drowning in a Daydream" was nominated at the Grammy Awards in 1998 for "Best Metal Performance".

=== America's Volume Dealer and In the Arms of God (1999–2006) ===
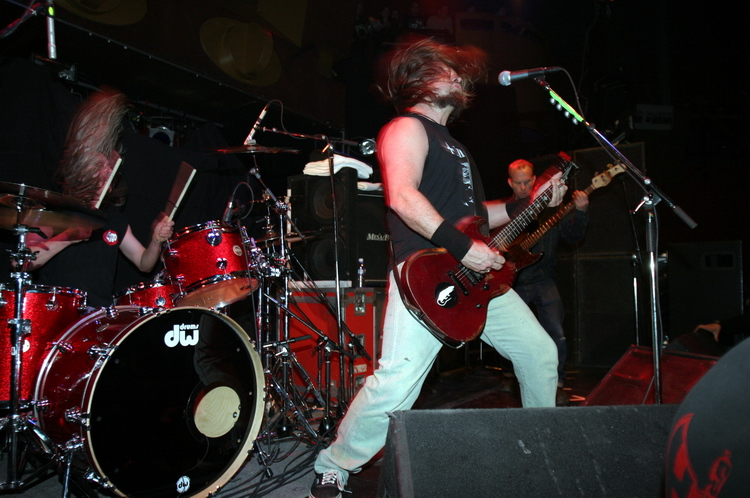
The band in 2005

Soon after the release of Wiseblood, Columbia dropped COC, who then moved to Sanctuary Records. The band released its first album for its new label, America's Volume Dealer, in September 2000. The album was even more of a commercial failure than Wiseblood not even managing to make the Billboard 200. However, the single, "Congratulations Song", did give the band another Top 30 hit. No videos were made from the album. Mullin left the band in 2001. Over the next few years, the band worked with a series of drummers: Jimmy Bower of Eyehategod, local Raleigh percussion professor Merritt Partridge, Stanton Moore of Galactic and Reed's former drum technician Jason Patterson, who previously played drums in the Raleigh-based rock band Cry of Love.

In April 2005, COC released In the Arms of God to much critical acclaim. The album performed much better than their previous effort, debuting at No. 108 on the Billboard 200 and even topping the Heatseekers chart. This was achieved without even one radio hit from the album. A video was made for the song "Stone Breaker" which saw airplay on MTV2's recently revived Headbanger's Ball. The band spent the rest of the year touring the US and Canada. They were the opening acts for Motörhead and Disturbed and also went on headlining tours with Crowbar, Fu Manchu, Alabama Thunderpussy, and Danko Jones all providing support. A European tour was scheduled for September/October 2005 but was later canceled, after Hurricane Katrina ravaged Keenan's hometown of New Orleans. A co-headlining UK tour with Clutch commenced in January 2006.

=== Second hiatus (2006–2010) ===
Corrosion of Conformity was on hiatus from 2006 to June 2010, while Pepper recorded and toured with Down. From March 2009 to June 2010, Karl Agell and Reed Mullin occasionally performed with Jerry Barrett, Scott Little, and Jason Browning (Browning eventually replaced by TR Gwynne) as "COC-Blind", playing the Blind album. Reed Mullin and Mike Dean along with Jason Browning also toured in a new band called "Righteous Fool", and have released a self-titled EP through Southern Lord Records.

=== Animosity lineup reunion, Corrosion of Conformity and IX (2010–2014) ===
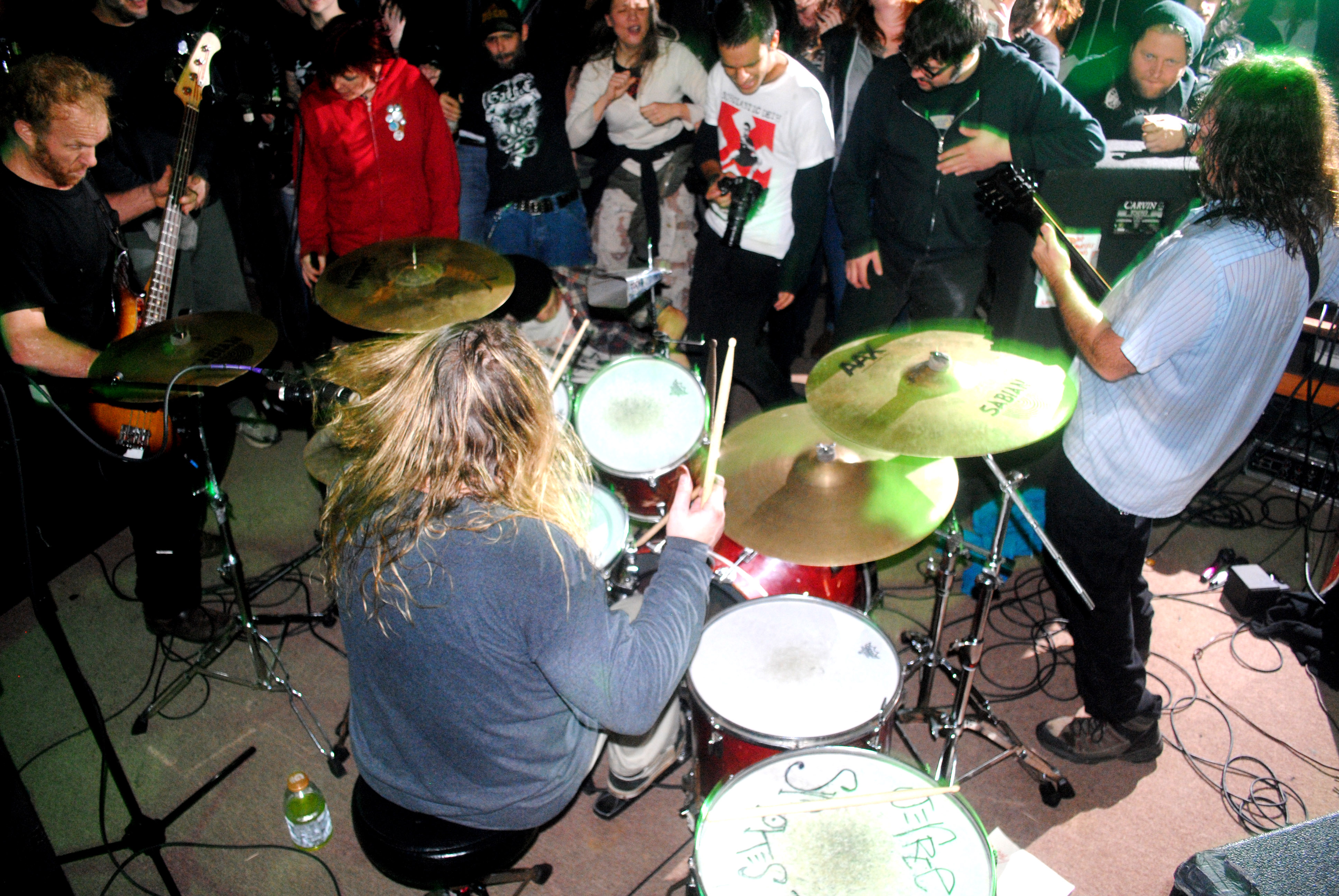
The Animosity-era lineup performing in 2010

On May 12, 2010, Blabbermouth.net reported that the Animosity lineup of Corrosion of Conformity was reuniting and working on a new album. They were planning some early-August shows lined up for the West Coast, although they had not yet been officially announced. The band was still open to recording again as a four-piece with Pepper when the time was right, according to a message on the official COC website on May 15, 2010. Pepper however, had not officially left the band.

Pepper joined his bandmates on stage on June 17, 2011, at the Hellfest (Clisson, France) to play "Vote with a Bullet" as well as on June 19, 2011, in Bilbao, Spain, where they additionally performed together on "Señor Limpio". Pepper stated that he looks forward to working on some Deliverance type material in the near future with the band. The band released their eighth studio album, titled Corrosion of Conformity, on February 28, 2012, via Candlelight Records.

In September 2012, Corrosion of Conformity posted three pictures from the studio on Facebook, stating that they were working on a five-song EP called Megalodon with Mike Schaefer and John Custer. The entire EP was released for digital download via Scion A/V on November 13, 2012.

By January 2013, Corrosion of Conformity had begun writing new material for their ninth studio album, IX, which was released on July 1, 2014.

=== Reunion with Pepper Keenan and No Cross No Crown (2014–2019) ===
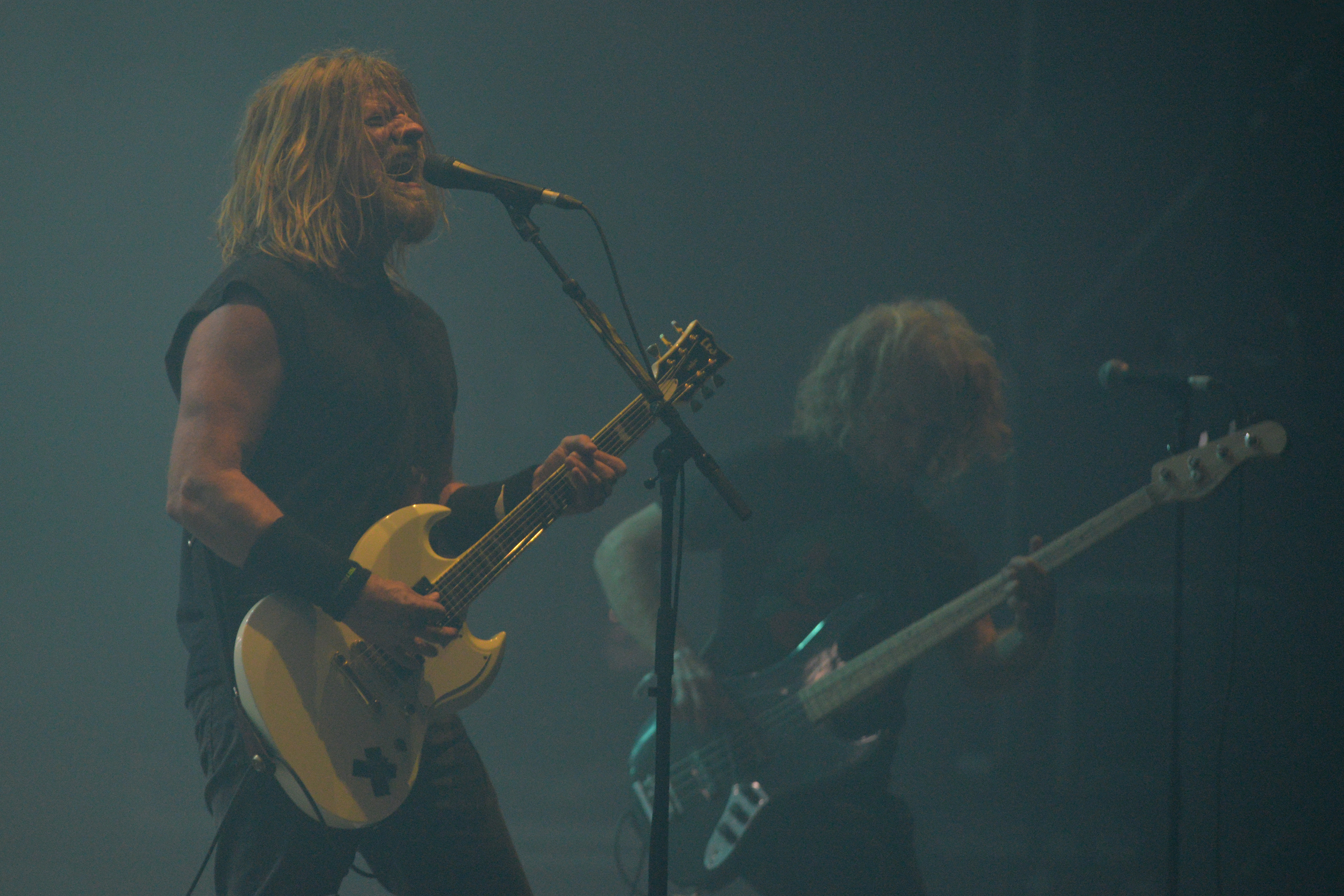
Frontman Pepper Keenan in 2018

In a September 2014 interview with Heavy Blog Is Heavy, drummer Reed Mullin confirmed that Corrosion of Conformity would reunite with guitarist/vocalist Pepper Keenan in 2015 to record a new album, followed by a tour. They planned to begin work on their new album in January 2015.

On January 14, 2015, Corrosion of Conformity announced a six-date UK tour, which took place in March and was their first tour with the Deliverance lineup in 14 years as well their first one with Keenan in nine years. Corrosion of Conformity performed their first show with the re-united Deliverance era lineup of Pepper Keenan, Woody Weatherman, Mike Dean, and Reed Mullin on March 7, 2015, in Manchester, England. Their first US tour with the reunited lineup, supporting Clutch, was announced on July 28, 2015.

On June 6, 2016, Corrosion of Conformity announced the letting go of drummer Reed Mullin after a prolonged battle with alcohol addiction, resulting in a seizure before their concert in Edmonton, Canada on the Lamb of God and Clutch tour. Mullin returned to the drum stool on the tour on June 8.

On November 10, 2017, the band announced that their tenth studio album, No Cross No Crown, would be released on January 12, 2018. The album's lead single "Cast the First Stone" was premiered on the same day.

=== Death of Reed Mullin, Mike Dean's second departure and Good God / Baad Man (2020–present) ===
Mullin died on January 27, 2020. His replacement was immediately announced to be John Green from Manchester, England, who had previously worked as the band's roadie and stepped in as a stand-in in 2019 for numerous shows.

On April 28, 2023, the band officially released a cover of "On the Hunt" by Lynyrd Skynyrd. This version, which was originally recorded in 2004, was also previously available in 2015.

Longtime bassist Mike Dean announced his second departure from Corrosion of Conformity on September 20, 2024, citing difficulties coping after Mullin's death and living "hundreds of miles away" from the remaining members of the band as factors.

On August 16, 2025 the band announced that they had finished recording a double album and were planning to release it in early 2026, with some of the guitar tracks being recorded at Barry Gibb's private studio in Miami and Stanton Moore on drums.

On September 22, 2025, the band returned with a special rendition of "Fire and Water" by Free. COC's version came spontaneously in the studio during some downtime while recording their forthcoming new full-length, and serves as the first of the Riffissippi Studio Jam Sessions Vol. 1, a special collection of jammed out interpretations of songs by some of the band's favorite artists.

The band's eleventh studio album, Good God / Baad Man, was released on April 3, 2026. The first single was "Gimme Some Moore", followed by "You or Me", "Asleep on the Killing Floor" and "Baad Man". Nearly a month prior to its release, Nick Shabatura replaced Stanton Moore as the band's drummer.

== Collaborations and side projects ==
They have also collaborated with a number of other artists: James Hetfield of Metallica contributed vocals to the song "Man or Ash" on Wiseblood; Warren Haynes of The Allman Brothers Band and Gov't Mule played slide guitar on "Stare Too Long" on America's Volume Dealer; and Stanton Moore of Galactic played drums on In the Arms of God.

Members of COC have also participated in collaborations: Keenan plays guitar with the metal supergroup Down, and Dean contributed vocals to a track titled "Access Babylon" on Dave Grohl's Probot project. Pepper also appears on Metallica's 1998 covers album Garage Inc., playing guitar and singing the second verse of the Lynyrd Skynyrd song "Tuesday's Gone". He appears in the documentary Some Kind of Monster, auditioning to be Metallica's replacement for Jason Newsted.

== Musical style and legacy ==
According to Dan Epstein of Guitar World, "C.O.C. were one of the first hardcore bands to successfully incorporate elements of metal into their attack. Despite numerous lineup changes, C.O.C. continued kicking into the millennium, albeit with more of a Skynyrd-influenced sound." RockList.com has noted that, "Corrosion of Conformity came howling out of Raleigh, North Carolina, in 1982 as a hardcore punk band, and over the years they slowed down, sank their teeth into the blues and emerged as a heavy metal band with red clay caked on its boots", and added that, "by the time of America's Volume Dealer in 2000 they were masters of the swaggering, sludgy Southern groove."

Corrosion of Conformity has been credited, alongside D.R.I., S.O.D. and Suicidal Tendencies, as one of the pioneers of crossover thrash.

== Members ==
Current members

- Woody Weatherman – lead guitar, backing vocals (1982–present)
- Pepper Keenan – lead vocals, rhythm guitar (1989–2006, 2015–present), backing vocals (1989–1993)
- Bobby Landgraf – bass, backing vocals (2024–present)
- Nick Shabatura – drums (2026–present)

== Discography ==
Corrosion of Conformity discography
- Studio albums: 11
- Extended plays: 4
- Live albums: 1
- Compilation albums: 1
- Singles: 11
- Music videos: 9

=== Studio albums ===
Year	Album details	Peak chart positions							Sales	Certifications
Year	Album details	US	US Heat.	AUS	FIN	FRA	SWE	UK	Sales	Certifications
1984	Eye for an Eye: Label: No Core/Toxic Shock/Caroline; Released: April 1984	—	—	—	—	—	—	—		
1985	Animosity: Label: Metal Blade; Released: October 25, 1985	—	—	—	—	—	—	—		
1991	Blind: Label: Relativity; Released: November 5, 1991	—	24	—	—	—	—	—	US: 250,000+	
1994	Deliverance: Label: Columbia; Released: September 27, 1994	155	5	—	—	—	—	—	US: 417,185+	RIAA: Gold
1996	Wiseblood: Label: Columbia; Released: October 15, 1996	104	2	—	39	—	—	43	US: 143,616+	
2000	America's Volume Dealer: Label: Sanctuary; Released: September 26, 2000	—	18	—	—	—	—	—	US: 55,171+	
2005	In the Arms of God: Label: Sanctuary; Released: April 5, 2005	108	1	—	—	196	41	147	US: 8,967	
2012	Corrosion of Conformity: Label: Candlelight; Released: February 28, 2012	157	5	—	—	—	—	—		
2014	IX: Label: Candlelight; Released: July 1, 2014	—	5	—	—	—	—	—		
2018	No Cross No Crown: Label: Nuclear Blast; Released: January 12, 2018	67	—	95	—	—	—	87		
2026	Good God / Baad Man: Label: Nuclear Blast; Released: April 3, 2026	—	—	—	—	—	—	—		
"—" denotes a release that did not chart.

=== Live albums ===
Year	Album details
2001	Live Volume: Label: Sanctuary; Released: August 7, 2001; Format: CD, DVD, DVDA

=== Compilation albums ===
Year	Album details
2010	Playlist: The Very Best of Corrosion of Conformity: Released: 2010; Label: Columbia

=== Extended plays ===
Year	EP details
1987	Technocracy: Label: Metal Blade; Released: 1987
1989	Six Songs with Mike Singing 1985: Label: Metal Blade; Released: 1989
2012	Megalodon: Label: Scion AV; Released: 2012

=== Singles ===
Year	Song	Peak chart positions		Album
Year	Song	US Main.	US Active Rock	Album
1991	"Dance of the Dead"	—	—	Blind
1992	"Vote with a Bullet"	—	—	Blind
1994	"Albatross"	19	—	Deliverance
1994	"Broken Man"	—	—	Deliverance
1995	"Clean My Wounds"	19	—	Deliverance
1995	"Seven Days"	—	—	Deliverance
1996	"Drowning in a Daydream"	27	—	Wiseblood
1996	"King of the Rotten"	—	—	Wiseblood
2000	"Congratulations Song"	24	24	America's Volume Dealer
2000	"Diablo Blvd."	—	—	America's Volume Dealer
2000	"Over Me"	—	—	America's Volume Dealer
2005	"Rise River Rise"	—	40	In the Arms of God
2005	"Stone Breaker"	—	—	In the Arms of God
2010	"Your Tomorrow (Parts 1 and 2)"	—	—	non-album single
2012	"The Doom"	—	—	Corrosion of Conformity
2012	"The Moneychangers"	—	—	Corrosion of Conformity
2012	"Psychic Vampire"	—	—	Corrosion of Conformity
2012	"Feed On"	—	—	Megalodon
2014	"The Nectar"	—	—	IX
2014	"Trucker"	—	—	IX
2014	"Tarquinius Superbus"	—	—	IX
2014	"On Your Way"	—	—	IX
2017	"Cast the First Stone"	—	—	No Cross No Crown
2017	"Wolf Named Crow"	—	—	No Cross No Crown
2018	"The Luddite"	—	—	No Cross No Crown
2023	"On the Hunt" (Lynyrd Skynyrd cover)	—	—	non-album single
2025	"Fire and Water" (Free cover)	—	—	Riffissippi Studio Jam Sessions Vol. 1
2026	"Gimme Some Moore"	—	—	Good God / Baad Man
2026	"You or Me"	—	—	Good God / Baad Man
2026	"Asleep on the Killing Floor"	—	—	Good God / Baad Man
2026	"Baad Man"	—	—	Good God / Baad Man
"—" denotes a release that did not chart.

=== Music videos ===
- "Dance of the Dead" (1991)
- "Vote with a Bullet" (1992)
- "Albatross" (1994)
- "Clean My Wounds" (1995)
- "Drowning in a Daydream" (1996)
- "Diablo Blvd." (2000)
- "Stone Breaker" (2005)
- "The Moneychangers" (2012)
- "Psychic Vampire" (2012)
- "Feed On" (2012)
- "Tarquinius Superbus" (2014)
- "On Your Way" (2014)
- "Cast the First Stone" (2017)
- "Wolf Named Crow" (2017)
- "The Luddite" (2018)
- "On the Hunt" (Lynyrd Skynyrd cover, 2023)
- "Fire and Water" (Free cover, 2025)
- "Gimme Some Moore" (2026)
- "You or Me" (2026)
- "Asleep on the Killing Floor" (2026)
- "Baad Man" (2026)

=== Compilation appearances ===
- No Core tape (1982, No Core)
- Why Are We Here? 7" (1983, No Core Records, "Poison Planet", "Indifferent", "Too Cool")
- Empty Skulls tape (1984, Fartblossom Enterprises, "Poison Planet", "Eye for an Eye")
- Cleanse the Bacteria LP (1985, Pusmort Records, "Kiss of Death")
- Thrasher Skate Rock Vol. 3 LP (1986, Thrasher/High Speed Records, "What", "Not for Me", "Citizen")
- Empty Skulls Vol. 2 LP (1986, Fartblossom Records, "Center of the World", "Eye for an Eye", "Negative Outlook")
- Complete Death LP (1986, Death Records, "Loss for Words")
- Life is a Joke Vol. 2 LP (1986, Weird System Records, "Eye for an Eye")
- Flipside Vinyl Fanzine Vol. 3 LP (1987, Gasatanka Records, "Intervention")
- Rat Music for Rat People 3 LP (1987, CD Presents Records, "Bound")
- Clerks soundtrack LP (1994, Columbia Records, "Big Problems")
- Nativity in Black: A Tribute to Black Sabbath LP (1994, Columbia Records, "Lord of This World")
- UMPF LP (1995, ???, "Clean My Wounds")
- It's Our Universe (It's Your Music) LP (1995, Sony Music Special Products, "Clean My Wounds")
- Duke Nukem: Music to Score By LP (1999, RED Interactive, "Land of the Free Disease")
- Xtreme Rock: Music That Changed Our Lives LP (1999, RED Distribution, "Land of the Free Disease")
- Motorcycle Mania 3 CD (2004, Artist Direct BMG, "Thirteen Angels")
- High Volume - The Stoner Rock Collection (2004, High Times/Caroline, "It Is that Way" (early version))
