= Steve McAllister =

Canadian journalist

Steve McAllister is a long-time Canadian sports media and communications expert. He currently is the Editor-In-Chief of Gaming News Canada and host of the Gaming News Canada Show podcast. He is also a co-founding partner of Parleh Media Group.

McAllister is the former managing editor of sports for Yahoo Canada, and the former sports editor of Canada's national newspaper, The Globe and Mail. He has also been the media relations manager for the National Hockey League Players' Association. McAllister covered the Toronto Blue Jays' back-to-back World Series championships in 1992 and 1993 as the national baseball writer for The Canadian Press. He was inducted into the Brockville and Area Sports Hall of Fame in June 2011, and was President of Sports Media Canada until 2024 when the organization closed its doors after its 25th Achievement Awards luncheon. He was honoured in his hometown of Prescott, Ont., in June 2014 by being placed on the South Grenville District High School Wall of Fame. McAllister was also an official in the Ontario Hockey League between 1981 and 1989, and refereed the first two games of the first unofficial world women's hockey championship in 1987.
