= In the Arms of God =

Studio album by Corrosion of Conformity
- Released: April 5, 2005
- Recorded: July 9 – December 8, 2004
- Genres: Stoner metal; southern metal; sludge metal
- Length: 64:27
- Label: Sanctuary
- Producers: Corrosion of Conformity; John Custer

Corrosion of Conformity chronology
Live Volume (2001)	In the Arms of God (2005)	Corrosion of Conformity (2012)

In the Arms of God is the seventh studio album by American heavy metal band Corrosion of Conformity, released on April 5, 2005. It is the last to feature Pepper Keenan on vocals and guitar until 2018's No Cross No Crown; although he rejoined the band in 2014. Stanton Moore of the band Galactic played drums on this album.

An early version of "It Is That Way" had appeared in 2004 on the compilation "High Volume - The Stoner Rock Collection".

An early version of "World on Fire" had appeared in 2000 on the Japanese edition of America's Volume Dealer.

== Critical reception ==
Professional ratings
Review scores
Source	Rating
AllMusic	3.5/5 stars
Blabbermouth.net	10/10
Collector's Guide to Heavy Metal	8/10
Encyclopedia of Popular Music	3/5 stars
PopMatters	8/10
Rock Hard	8/10
Rolling Stone	3.5/5 stars

In 2005, In the Arms of God was ranked number 330 in Rock Hard magazine's book of The 500 Greatest Rock & Metal Albums of All Time.

== Track listing ==
All lyrics are written by Pepper Keenan, except track 7, co-written with Mike Dean. All music are written by Corrosion of Conformity, except tracks 5, 10 and 11, co-written with John Custer.

No.	Title	Length
1.	"Stone Breaker"	5:16
2.	"Paranoid Opioid"	6:30
3.	"It Is That Way"	5:17
4.	"Dirty Hands Empty Pockets / Already Gone"	4:51
5.	"Rise River Rise"	5:06
6.	"Never Turns to More"	8:15
7.	"Infinite War"	3:46
8.	"So Much Left Behind"	5:18
9.	"The Backslider"	6:29
10.	"World on Fire"	4:01
11.	"Crown of Thorns"	2:33
12.	"In the Arms of God"	6:55

Japanese bonus track
No.	Title	Length
13.	"Jaguar"	2:49

== Personnel ==
Corrosion of Conformity

- Pepper Keenan – lead vocals, rhythm guitar
- Woody Weatherman – lead guitar, backing vocals (track 7)
- Mike Dean – bass, backing vocals (track 7)
- Stanton Moore – drums, percussion

Additional personnel

- John Custer – production, Hammond organ (track 1), guitar solo (track 4), acoustic guitar (track 12)
- Mike Dean – engineering

== Chart positions ==
Album

Chart (2005)	Position
Billboard 200	108
