= Eye for an Eye (Corrosion of Conformity album) =

Studio album by Corrosion of Conformity
- Released: April 1984
- Recorded: 1983
- Studio: Hummingbird Sound Studios
- Genre: Hardcore punk
- Length: 35:37
- Labels: No Core, Toxic Shock
- Producer: Corrosion of Conformity

Corrosion of Conformity chronology
Eye for an Eye (1984)	Animosity (1985)

Professional ratings
Review scores
Source	Rating
AllMusic	3/5 stars
Encyclopedia of Popular Music	3/5 stars

Eye for an Eye is the debut studio album by American heavy metal band Corrosion of Conformity, released in April 1984. CD releases have had the entire Six Songs with Mike Singing EP included as bonus tracks.

== Track listing ==
All tracks are written by Mike Dean, Woody Weatherman and Reed Mullin, except where noted.

No.	Title	Writer(s)	Length
1.	"Tell Me"		3:29
2.	"Minds Are Controlled"		1:35
3.	"Indifferent"		1:18
4.	"Broken Will"		1:34
5.	"Rabid Dogs"		0:40
6.	"L.S."		2:15
7.	"Rednekkk"		1:19
8.	"Coexist"		2:51
9.	"Excluded"		1:13
10.	"Dark Thoughts"		1:50
11.	"Poison Planet"		1:27
12.	"What?"		2:32
13.	"Negative Outlook"		0:53
14.	"Positive Outlook"		2:13
15.	"No Drunk"		0:24
16.	"College Town"		2:05
17.	"Not Safe"		2:31
18.	"Eye for an Eye"		1:20
19.	"Nothing's Gonna Change"		1:12
20.	"Green Manalishi" (Fleetwood Mac cover)	Peter Green	2:56
Total length:			35:37

CD release bonus tracks from the Six Songs with Mike Singing EP
No.	Title	Length
21.	"Eye for an Eye"	1:14
22.	"Center of the World"	0:29
23.	"Citizen"	0:49
24.	"Not for Me"	1:08
25.	"What?"	2:26
26.	"Negative Outlook"	0:55
Total length:		42:34

== Personnel ==
Corrosion of Conformity

- Eric Eycke – lead vocals
- Woody Weatherman – guitars
- Mike Dean – bass, backing vocals
- Reed Mullin – drums

Production

- Corrosion of Conformity – production
- David Mahon – engineering
- Errol – cover art
