= Animosity (Corrosion of Conformity album) =

Studio album by Corrosion of Conformity
- Released: October 25, 1985
- Recorded: 1985
- Studios: Track Record, Los Angeles, CA (tracks 1–5); Hummingbird Sound, Raleigh, NC (tracks 6–10)
- Genres: Crossover thrash; hardcore punk
- Length: 26:22
- Label: Death

Corrosion of Conformity chronology
Eye for an Eye (1984)	Animosity (1985)	Technocracy (1987)

Professional ratings
Review scores
Source	Rating
AllMusic	4/5 stars
Encyclopedia of Popular Music	3/5 stars

Animosity is the second studio album by American heavy metal band Corrosion of Conformity. It was released on October 25, 1985. The album cover art was done by artist Pushead.

== Track listing ==
All tracks are written by Mike Dean, Woody Weatherman and Reed Mullin.

No.	Title	Length
1.	"Loss for Words"	4:06
2.	"Mad World"	1:54
3.	"Consumed"	2:52
4.	"Holier"	2:27
5.	"Positive Outlook"	3:04
6.	"Prayer"	2:26
7.	"Intervention"	2:26
8.	"Kiss of Death"	1:31
9.	"Hungry Child"	1:19
10.	"Animosity" (instrumental)	4:16
Total length:		26:22

The song "Positive Outlook" is a re-recorded version of the song originally released on the band's 1984 album Eye for an Eye.

== Covers ==
- Metallica, longtime fans of Corrosion of Conformity, performed the song "Holier" at least twice live in concert (Los Angeles and Donington).
- Solarfeast covered "Mad World" on their 1995 album Gossamer (it was the hidden track).
- Monster Voodoo Machine covered "Holier" on their 1998 album Direct Reaction Now! (it was the hidden track).
- All Out War covered "Mad World" on their 1998 album For Those Who Were Crucified (it was the hidden track).
- Iron Monkey covered "Kiss of Death" on their 1999 EP We've Learned Nothing.
- Severed Head of State covered "Prayer" on their 2002 EP No Love Lost.
- Agoraphobic Nosebleed covered "Hungry Child" on their 2005 compilation album Bestial Machinery (Discography Volume 1).
- Mr. Bungle covered "Loss for Words" several times during their Disco Volante tour and released their version on The Raging Wrath of the Easter Bunny Demo (2020).

== Personnel ==
Corrosion of Conformity

- Mike Dean – bass, vocals
- Woody Weatherman – guitars
- Reed Mullin – drums, vocals

Production

- Pushead – front cover
- Simon Bob Sinister – back cover
- Brian Slagel – executive producer
- Bill Metoyer – engineering (tracks 1–5)
- David Schmitt – engineering (track 6–10)
- Eddy Schreyer – mastering
