= Technocracy (EP) =

EP by Corrosion of Conformity
- Released: 1987
- Recorded: September 1986
- Genre: Crossover thrash
- Length: 13:04
- Label: Metal Blade
- Producers: Dick Hodgin, Corrosion of Conformity

Corrosion of Conformity chronology
Animosity (1985)	Technocracy (1987)	Blind (1991)

Professional ratings
Review scores
Source	Rating
AllMusic	3/5 stars

Technocracy is an EP by American heavy metal band Corrosion of Conformity. It was released in 1987 on Metal Blade Records and re-released in 1992 via Relativity Records with four additional songs, including three demo versions of songs from the EP with bassist Mike Dean singing. The song "Hungry Child" is a re-recorded version of the song originally released on the band's 1985 album Animosity.

== Track listing ==
1. "Technocracy" – 3:13
2. "Hungry Child" – 1:15
3. "Happily Ever After" – 4:22
4. "Crawling" – 4:23
5. "Ahh Blugh (Milking the Sick Farce)" – 0:31

=== Bonus tracks on Relativity re-release (demo) ===
6. "Intervention" – 2:10
7. "Technocracy" – 3:27
8. "Crawling" – 5:00
9. "Happily Ever After" – 4:34

== Personnel ==
- Simon Bob – lead vocals
- Woody Weatherman – guitars
- Mike Dean – bass, lead vocals on bonus songs
- Reed Mullin – drums, backing vocals
