= Deliverance (Corrosion of Conformity album) =

Studio album by Corrosion of Conformity
- Released: September 27, 1994
- Recorded: 1993–1994
- Genres: Stoner rock; Southern metal; stoner metal
- Length: 54:24
- Label: Columbia
- Producer: John Custer

Corrosion of Conformity chronology
| Blind (1991) | Deliverance (1994) | Wiseblood (1996) |

Singles from Deliverance
- 1. "Albatross" Released: August 1994; 2. "Broken Man" Released: 1994; 3. "Clean My Wounds" Released: January 1995; 4. "Seven Days" Released: 1995

Deliverance is the fourth album by Corrosion of Conformity, and the first on which Pepper Keenan was lead singer. It was also their first recording on Columbia Records. Kerrang! described Deliverance as a "true 90s classic". The song "Mano de Mono" is heard in the movie The Fan. The song "Albatross" is playable in the video game Guitar Hero: Metallica and Guitar Hero Live.

In 2014, Rolling Stone magazine ranked Deliverance at #31 on their list of the best rock albums of 1994. It was certified gold by the RIAA in 2023 for selling over 500,000 units in the United States.

== Reception ==
Professional ratings
Review scores
| Source | Rating |
|---|---|
| AllMusic | 4/5 stars |
| Collector's Guide to Heavy Metal | 9/10 |
| Encyclopedia of Popular Music | 3/5 stars |
| Entertainment Weekly | A− |
| Kerrang! | 4/5 stars |
| Select | 2/5 stars |

Deliverance received a positive review from AllMusic writer Eduardo Rivadavia, who gave the album four stars out of five, and stated, "With guitarist Pepper Keenan now at the helm as lead singer and principal songwriter, COC abandoned most of the punk influences of their crossover past and turned into a full-fledged Sabbath-inspired metal band with 1994's Deliverance." Rivadavia claimed that the songs on Deliverance are "built on monolithic power chords which range from ferocious speed on 'Heaven's Not Overflowing' and 'Senor Limpio' to slower, groovier numbers such as "Broken Man" and leadoff single 'Albatross.' Second single 'Clean My Wounds' also struck gold at rock radio with its staccato riffing, and 'Seven Days' adds eerie guitar melodies to the mix."

Deliverance was Corrosion of Conformity's first album to enter the Billboard 200 chart; it peaked at number 155, making it their fourth highest-charting album to date. It also peaked at number five on the Heatseekers chart. Both "Albatross" and "Clean My Wounds" peaked at number 19 on the Mainstream Rock chart, making them the highest initial charting single in Corrosion of Conformity's career.

== Track listing ==
| No. | Title | Writer(s) | Length |
|---|---|---|---|
| 1. | "Heaven's Not Overflowing" | Pepper Keenan, Woody Weatherman | 5:02 |
| 2. | "Albatross" | Keenan, Reed Mullin | 5:20 |
| 3. | "Clean My Wounds" | Keenan | 3:32 |
| 4. | "Without Wings" (instrumental) | Keenan | 1:54 |
| 5. | "Broken Man" | Keenan, Mullin | 4:54 |
| 6. | "Señor Limpio" | Keenan | 3:53 |
| 7. | "Mano de Mono" (instrumental) | Weatherman | 1:35 |
| 8. | "Seven Days" | Keenan, Mullin, John Custer | 4:56 |
| 9. | "#2121313" (instrumental) | Keenan, Custer | 1:02 |
| 10. | "My Grain" | Keenan, Weatherman | 3:19 |
| 11. | "Deliverance" | Weatherman, Mike Dean, Phil Swisher | 4:23 |
| 12. | "Shake Like You" | Keenan, Mullin | 4:19 |
| 13. | "Shelter" | Keenan | 3:25 |
| 14. | "Pearls Before Swine" | Keenan, Mullin | 6:45 |

Japanese bonus track
| No. | Title | Writer(s) | Length |
|---|---|---|---|
| 15. | "Big Problems" | Mullin, Weatherman | 2:14 |

== Personnel ==
Corrosion of Conformity

- Pepper Keenan – lead vocals, rhythm guitar
- Woody Weatherman – lead guitar
- Mike Dean – bass, lead vocals on "Deliverance"
- Reed Mullin – drums, backing vocals, lead vocals on "Big Problems"

Additional personnel

- Bruce Smith – pedal steel guitar on "Shelter"

Production

- Arranged by Corrosion of Conformity
- Produced by John Custer
- Engineered by Jeff Tomei, Mark Richardson and John Custer, with assistance by Danny Kadar and D. E. G. S.
- Mixed by John Custer (tracks 4, 7, 9, 11 and 13), Richard Mouser (track 6 and additional mixing on track 10) and Toby Wright (tracks 1–3, 5, 6, 8, 10, 12 and 14)
- Mastered by Bob Ludwig

== Chart positions ==
Album

| Chart (1994) | Position |
|---|---|
| Billboard 200 | 155 |

Singles

| Song | Chart (1994) | Position |
|---|---|---|
| "Albatross" | Mainstream Rock Tracks | 19 |
| "Clean My Wounds" | Mainstream Rock Tracks | 19 |

== Certifications ==
| Region | Certification | Certified units/sales |
|---|---|---|
| United States (RIAA) | Gold | 500,000^{‡} |
^{‡} Sales+streaming figures based on certification alone.
