= America's Volume Dealer =

Studio album by Corrosion of Conformity
- Released: September 26, 2000
- Recorded: 1999–2000
- Genre: Southern metal
- Length: 45:48
- Label: Sanctuary
- Producer: John Custer

Corrosion of Conformity chronology
Wiseblood (1996)	America's Volume Dealer (2000)	Live Volume (2001)

America's Volume Dealer is the sixth studio album by American heavy metal band Corrosion of Conformity, released on September 26, 2000. It was the last album to feature longtime drummer Reed Mullin for nine years until his return in 2010.

== Reception ==
Steve Huey from AllMusic gave America's Volume Dealer three stars out of five. He described the album as "COC's most radio-friendly record yet", mainly because "the production is more polished, and while the guitars are still high-voltage, the sludgy murk of their most inspiringly heavy records is largely absent."

However, Huey admits that "even if some fans might be disappointed that they [COC] have left the garage, the songs hold up well -- they're melodic and well-crafted, and there's enough variety in the album's pacing to keep it an engaging listen the whole way through."

Professional ratings
Review scores
Source	Rating
AllMusic	3/5 stars
Blabbermouth.net	7/10
Collector's Guide to Heavy Metal	5/10
Encyclopedia of Popular Music	3/5 stars

== Track listing ==
All lyrics are written by Pepper Keenan; all music is composed by Corrosion of Conformity, except "Take What You Want" and "Steady Roller", co-written with John Custer. "Rather See You Dead", lyrics and music by Jerry Anomie.

No.	Title	Length
1.	"Over Me"	4:19
2.	"Congratulations Song"	3:20
3.	"Stare Too Long"	4:56
4.	"Diablo Blvd."	3:28
5.	"Doublewide"	4:15
6.	"Zippo"	4:28
7.	"Who's Got the Fire"	3:16
8.	"Sleeping Martyr"	4:59
9.	"Take What You Want"	3:30
10.	"13 Angels"	6:35
11.	"Gittin' It On"	2:35

UK version bonus tracks
No.	Title	Length
12.	"Rather See You Dead" (Legionaire's Disease Band cover)	1:44
13.	"Steady Roller" (Demo Version)	2:23

Japanese version bonus tracks
No.	Title	Length
12.	"Rather See You Dead" (Legionaire's Disease Band cover)	1:44
13.	"World on Fire" (early version; later re-recorded on In the Arms of God)	3:43

== Personnel ==
=== Corrosion of Conformity ===
- Pepper Keenan – vocals, guitar
- Woody Weatherman – guitar
- Mike Dean – bass, Rhodes piano on "13 Angels"
- Reed Mullin – drums

=== Additional personnel ===
- Warren Haynes – slide guitar on "Stare Too Long"
- Teresa Williams – backing vocals on "Stare Too Long"
- Chen Chapman – backing vocals on "Stare Too Long"
- Doug Wilson – piano on "Stare Too Long"
- John Custer – additional guitar on "Stare Too Long", "Sleeping Martyr" and "Zippo"

== Singles ==
Year	Single	Chart	Position
2000	"Congratulations Song"	Mainstream Rock Tracks	24
