= John Custer =

American music producer

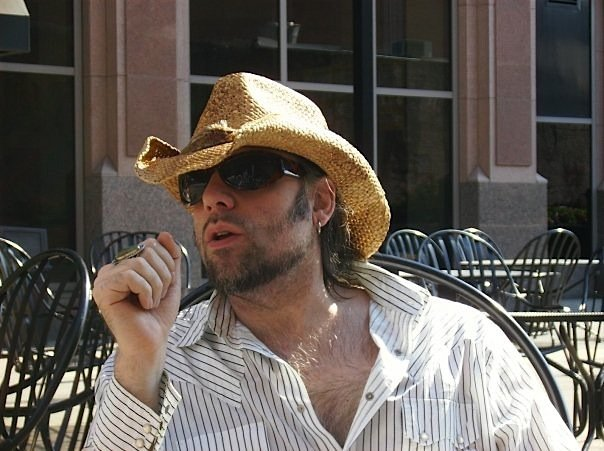

Background information
- Born: October 30, 1962 (age 63); North Carolina, U.S.
- Occupations: Record producer, songwriter, musician
- Instruments: Guitar, keyboards
- Formerly of: Theatrics, Four Hard Men, John Custer and Kevin, John Custer and the Malcolm Baldridge Memorial Rhythm Section, John Custer and Asylum Hill, Teresa Williams & John Custer, John Custer Band
- Website: johncusterproduction.com

John Custer (born October 30, 1962) is an American record producer and musician. He produced the Grammy-nominated "Drowning in a Daydream" by Corrosion of Conformity and their fourth album, Deliverance, which is a gold album. Additionally, he has produced #1 songs on the Billboard charts and The Album Network charts as well as Hall of Fame inducted albums in national and worldwide music press. In 2014, he received the Lifetime Achievement Award at the Carolina Music Awards. He has been called the "Indestructible Godfather of the NC Music Industry".

== Early life ==
Custer is from Cary, North Carolina, the son of Donald and Janine Custer, who had worked for the United States Secret Service and CIA, respectively, and moved to Cary in the early 1960s. Donald Custer began a new career with IBM in the Research Triangle Park. Custer describes his parents as "more than cosmopolitan folk", exposing him to a wide range of musical styles. He had an early passion for music and would play his father's "forbidden guitar" every chance he could."

His early musical influences include Herb Albert and the Tijuana Brass, Marvin Gaye, Ricki Lee Jones, Queen, Sex Pistols, and The Clash. The North Carolina band Nantucket was also an inspiration to Custer. In 2017, he told writer David Manconi, "I remember being at a party, seeing their records, and my jaw dropping. They were real albums on a real record label with real artwork and all that—and from here! It made you think that things were possible…."

Custer graduated from Cary High School in 1981. After high school, he joined the Theatrics, a band that played the Southeastern Circuit, (Maryland down to Florida), playing covers so they could slide–in original material. He also met his first music mentor, drummer Kenny Soule from the bands PKM and Nantucket.

Around the age of 22 years, Custer moved to New York City and worked as a session guitarist at the Vision Sound Studios, providing guitar tracks for national television commercials such as Coca–Cola, Ford, Jovan, Mazda, Revlon, and VH1. Custer says commercial work was "nothing but pressure" because "you'd get one shot".

Back from New York In 1986, Custer played guitar in the Raleigh area band Four Hard Men with bassist Steev Adams (Pressure Boys, The Hanks), Tony Bowman on keyboards, and Chris Jenson on drums. Another configuration of this group was called Three Hard Men with Custer on guitar, Adams on bass, and Kenny Soule on drums. Over the years, Custer played with a number of short–lived bands: John Custer and Kevin, John Custer and the Malcolm Baldridge Memorial Rhythm Section, John Custer and Asylum Hill, Teresa Williams & John Custer, and his own John Custer Band. In 1990, Custer joined Jake Ferrell in a reboot of the band Subliminal Surge.

Custer met Byron McCay, former guitarist of Subliminal Surge and founder/owner of JAG Studios in Raleigh. McCay had soured on the music business but was invigorated by Custer, saying "Custer was a guitar whiz, one of the first locals to crack the Eddie Van Halen's supersonic code".

At age 25, Custer began producing and developing original artists at JAG Studios. He produced a four-song cassette for the Raleigh band, The Distance, in 1989. One reviewer of The Distance's recordings noted, "Producer John Custer creates a madcap roller derby of ringing guitar riffs" on one track, and "crisp, clear aural onslaught' on another. Custer also produced a rap song for comedian Rich Hall, his own original music for the WRAL–TV's Rob and Bill's Talk Show, and demo tapes for the Raleigh bands Cry of Love, and Automatic Slim.

== Career ==
=== Corrosion of Conformity ===
Custer's first major project was producing the album Blind (Relativity Records, 1991) for the Raleigh punk thrash band Corrosion of Conformity (later COC). Decibel notes, "Allowing the North Carolinians ample space to find their proverbial groove was fledgling producer John Custer. When Corrosion of Conformity entered Baby Monster Studios in NYC in 1990, they were a full-on heavy metal outfit, and Custer was, to a large degree, the group's sonic tactician." COC bassist Mike Dean seems to agree, stating, "We were dabbling in metal. When [we] got up with John Custer and started really refining that stuff for Blind, that's when something really awesome started happening." An AllMusic review praised Blind as "simply one of the most important heavy rock albums of the decade".

COC ended up on the major label Columbia Records because Sony/Columbia acquired half–ownership of the COC's first label Relativity. Since Blind, Custer has produced numerous COC albums, including Deliverance (Columbia, 1994), Wiseblood (Columbia, 1996), America's Volume Dealer (Sanctuary Records, 2000), In the Arms of God (Sanctuary Records, 2005), Corrosion of Conformity (Candlelight Records, 2012), Megalodon EP (Scion Audio/Video, 2012), and IX (Candlelight Records, 2014).

When Wiseblood was released, one reviewer noted, "It is producer John Custer who bears the brunt of the sound's synergy... A finer sound and recording wizard cannot be had." COC member Reed Mullin said, "He [Custer ] contributes an enormous amount of stuff that isn't written in the liner notes. A lot of the writing credits are his… He's the king. He's the fifth member." The COC track "Drowning in a Daydream" from Wiseblood was nominated for a Grammy Award in 1997 for Best Metal Performance.

After the band had worked with Custer on four albums, COC frontman Pepper Keenan was asked why they had continued to work with this producer. Keenan replied:

I've talked to some really big producers and they don't know as much as John Custer. I'll bet my life on it. He's amazing but he hates the record companies. He hates dealing with egos. He's been asked to do a bunch of big things and he's like, "No f----n' way!" He is truly a musician/producer. He's like the Daniel Lanois of our little circle and he does not want to put up with that s--t. It's about songwriting, it's about getting the tones on tape and not being scared to take chances. A lot of bands, the only reason they're asking him to do 'em is 'cause they've heard COC records, but they don't understand that COC put their ass on the line to do these records and John Custer's not going to babysit somebody 'cause they want to have a certain sound. You've got to want to do that and write those things.

When recording America's Volume Dealer, Custer says, "It was our first foray into ProTools, which is digital recording. We'd made everything else on tape. We got hooked on gadgets. It was a mistake to record them in that format. …We thought, 'Now we can make it sound awesome!' And it sounded less than awesome." In his review of COC's Megalodon, Rob Grissom said, "The legendary and immortal John Custer has once again produced another hardcore masterpiece and seemingly assumes his majestic role as the maestro of the North Carolina music scene."

Some of Custer's high-profile collaborations for COC projects include working with Warren Haynes (The Allman Brothers Band, Gov't Mule) who played slide guitar on "Stare Too Long," James Hetfield (Metallica) who sang backup vocals on "Man or Ash", and Stanton Moore (Galactic) who played drums on the album In the Arms of God.

=== Cry of Love ===
In 1993, Custer produced the album Brother for Cry of Love. Cry of Love received a recording contract with Sony (later Columbia) after submitting their demo produced by Custer to the North Carolina Music Showcase in 1992. Brother was recorded over four weeks at Muscle Shoals Sound Studio in Alabama. One reviewer called Brother's sound "loose and live". The band's guitarist Audley Freed said, "John is just a brilliant guy. He's not the anal type who will make you do 75 takes and then cut the tape up to slice together the final version. He's a very good hybrid of feel and meticulousness…John is great at letting things happen."

On the September 4, 1993, Brother premiered at number 36 on the Billboard' Heartseeker Chart for new acts. Brother's first single, "Peace Pipe," went to No. 1 on Billboard Rock Radio Chart, and stayed there four weeks. "Bad Thing", one of several songs on Brother co-written with Custer, went No. 1 on the Album Network Chart and No. 2 the Billboard Rock Radio Chart.

Custer also produced and mixed Cry of Love's second album, Diamonds & Debris, which was released in 1997 by Columbia.

=== DAG ===
With COC and Cry of Love both signed to Columbia, Custer was hired by the label for artist development, giving him what he calls "a pathway to the A&R department". Custer's hand-picked funk–creation DIG (later DAG) was quickly signed by Columbia because of a Custer–produced a demo tape consisting of just one song. The band changed its name to DAG after discovering a preexisting band in New Jersey named DIG. DAG included drummer Kenny Soul (Nantucket, PKM), along with three members of the Raleigh band Mr. Potatohead: keyboard/vocalist Doug Jervey, guitarist Brian Dennis, and bassist/vocalist Bobby Patterson. Custer was a fifth member of sorts, writing the majority of the group's songs.

DAG origins stem from Custer attending a performance of the Raleigh, North Carolina cover band Mr. Potatohead. Custer said, "When I saw them for the first time, they were nailing this 45 [Earth, Wind & Fire's 'Shining Star'] I had when I was 9 years old and it was perfect. So this music was something we had in common…that's when I got this idea for this." Custer's concept for DAG was to record old-school funk but with original songs rather than covers.

DAG's first release, Righteous (1994) was recorded at Muscle Shoals Sound Studio, with Custer producing, writing or co-writing the tracks. Because of the timeline suggested by Columbia and the newness of the band, Custer says the songs were written on the spot, in the studio. True to its inspiration of 1970s funk, Righteous featured guest performances by Roger Hawkins of the Muscle Shoals Rhythm Section and jazz trumpeter Jeremy Davenport. The first reviews of Righteous were "glowing," praising its "undiluted funk." Vibe magazine hailed the album as "one of the best funk records since 1978. DAG's debut, Righteous, is definitely some of the most ass-grinding grooves you've heard since back in the day." Other releases by DAG and Custer include Apartment 635 (Columbia 1998) and A Guide to Groovy Lovin' (Columbia 1998).

=== Other projects ===
While working in artist development for Columbia, Custer produced the album Din of Ecstasy for singer–songwriter Chris Whitley in 1995, and wrote the song "Ha Ha Ha" with Sass Jordan's for her 1997 album Present (1997). Custer was shortlisted to produce the next Aerosmith album, but really wanted to help bands in North Carolina. Custer said, "Arrowsmith does not need me, but I thought there were some bands from here [North Carolina] that should have been the biggest thing ever." As a result, he decided to stay in North Carolina and see what he could make happen.

Custer worked on Some Get Lucky (Lalo Records, 1994), the first album of Larry Hutcherson (Backsliders). He also co-produced Invisible and Bullet Proof (Hal Jalikakik,1995) for Automatic Slim.

In 1998, Custer produced the album The Brothers' Love and Movie for the band Hipbone from Chapel Hill. Custer also produced Gran Torino Two (26.2 Music, 1999) for Knoxville's Gran Torino. Chris Ford, Gran Torino's lead singer, said the band brought in "hip producer John Custer to improve its sound".

Raleigh quintet Dolo got Custer to produce their self–titled album Dolo (Really Big Record, 2000). Dolo was led by Bill Guandolo—of the Rob and Bill Talk Show that featured original music by Custer. For this project, Guandolo again turned to Custer who wrote seven of the album's ten songs. Custer says, "Dolo is a real poppy thing."

In 2004, Custer recorded COC's Mike Dean's vocals for the track "Access Babylon" on Probot's self–titled album. Probot is an all-star project of Dave Grohl (Nirvana, Foo Fighters). Recording the track at JAG Studios, Dean said, "It took all of 90 minutes."

In 2008, Custer produced Bull City Syndicate's first album, You Make Me Feel. Custer co–wrote their track "Bull City Groove." Custer also produced two albums by the Burlington, North Carolina band, Jive Mother Mary―the EP Jive Mother Mary (2009) and the LP All Fall Down (2009). In In 2012, Custer produced 3PLAY, the third recording of The Will McBride Group. Custer also produced Eugene, Oregon's The Sawyer Family's third album of "gruangabilly" .The Burning Tree (Scary As Hell Music, 2008), and their fourth album Sawyer Family (Ghost Owl Records, 2015).

Burlington-based BIG Something are Custer's current funk–rock "protegees." He produced their album Songs from the Middle of Nowhere (2010) which was #1 on the Jambands.com radio charts for several week. Custer and BIG Something also worked together on the albums Big Something (2013), Truth Serum (2014), Tumbleweed (2017), and The Otherside (2018). When asked what it was like working with Custer as a producer, BIG Something replied, "It forced us to grow as artists and musicians…It was like getting schooled by a Rock 'n' Roll Jedi master."

Some of Custer's newest projects include producing the albums for the bands Army of the Dog and The Confessor, both from Raleigh, as well as vocalist Nico Arte.

=== Music ===
In 2000, Custer created the pop-oriented band Brown with Reed Mullen (COC) on lead vocals and guitar, drummer Marvin Levy (The Veldt), bassist Des White (The Veldt),guitarist and vocalist Mikel Ross (Darkstar/Traviana Farm/Brite Boy), and keyboardist Michael Thrower (Darkstar), Custer says, "We all play basketball together―that's how this started. Then one night instead of hoops, we played music. It worked out, so we kept doing it." Brown recorded a five–track, self-released EP called Satellite, but said they had 35 other songs ready to record. Caitlyn Cary (vocals/fiddle for Whiskeytown, Tres Chicas, and solo) recorded a song with Brown. Mullen says, "I'm doing Brown because Custer and Mikey are my best friends, I've always wanted to play with them, and this is the funniest thing I have done in my life. We can go in all sorts of directions with it." However, in 2002, Brown announced that it was changing its name because there is another band with that name in New Jersey. Furthermore, Custer said, "The band has become a heavy rock band now. It's no longer a poppy, singles–type thing…so we're gonna kinda start all over again―new name, new tunes."

In 2001, Custer played lead guitar for the band Mother Soul. In 2002, he played in the on-stage band for the Raleigh Ensemble Players' version of the musical Hedwig and the Angry Inch, with a reviewer noting that the band "are well rehearsed".

As of 2019, Custer is scoring a movie about a funk band, and working on his own opera that will feature singers from Raleigh choirs.

=== Soundtracks ===
Custer has produced several tracks that were used in major film soundtracks:

- "Big Problems" by Corrosion of Conformity appears in Clerks starring Kevin Smith.
- "Mano de Mono" by Corrosion of Conformity appears in The Fan starring Robert De Niro.
- "Sweet Little Lass", performed by DAG and written by Custer, is featured in Bad Boys starring Will Smith.
- "As" performed by DAG and co-written by Custer, appears in Robert Altman's Ready to Wear starring Kim Basinger and Sophia Loren.

== Recognition ==
- In 1993, Custer's original music for WRAL–TV's Rob and Bill Talk Show, including "Grease of the Week" and "Welcome Back to Rob and Bill", was nominated a regional Emmy Award.
- In 1997, "Drowning in a Daydream" from COC's Wiseblood was nominated for a Grammy Award for Best Metal Performance.
- Custer was recognized by the John Lennon Songwriting Contest for co-writing and producing Gran Torino's "Moments with You" which won the award for the Best Pop Song of the Year in 2000.
- Produced by Custer, Big Something's Songs from the Middle of Nowhere won the Home Grown Music Network's Album of the Year 2010; BIG Something also won the award for New Band.
- In 2013, Big Something's self–titled album, produced by Custer, won Album of the Year awards from Angelica Music, Endless Boundaries Radio, and the Home Grown Music Network.
- Custer was featured on the cover of 3 Dot Mag in January 2014. 3 Dot dubbed him as, "The Indestructible Godfather of North Carolina Music Industry".
- In 2014, Custer received the Lifetime Achievement Award at the Carolina Music Awards.
- In January 2019, Metallica played the song "Lovely Jane" which was written by Custer, at their concert in Raleigh, North Carolina.

== Equipment ==
In a 2019 interview, Custer named his favorite equipment of all time:

- Acoustic Guitar — Taylor
- Amp — Vox, the old one with sand in the back
- Bass — an old, old Fender Precision Bass
- Compression — Blackface 1176
- Console — Magic Shop Neve
- Drum — old, old Slingerlands
- Drum Machine — Roland 707 (but he hasn't seen one in 25 years)
- Electric Guitar — Stratocaster
- Guitar Speaker Cabinet — Orange Amps
- Piano — off-brand baby grand in the New York studio
- Reverb — Lexicon
- Synthesizer — Moog Prodigy
- V-8 Amplifier — SS7
- Vocal Mic — B & B Studios of Carrboro, N.C.'s version of U87

== Personal ==
In 2013, Custer was in a car accident and died for five minutes. He lives in Raleigh, North Carolina.
