= Pepper Keenan =

American guitarist and singer (born 1967)

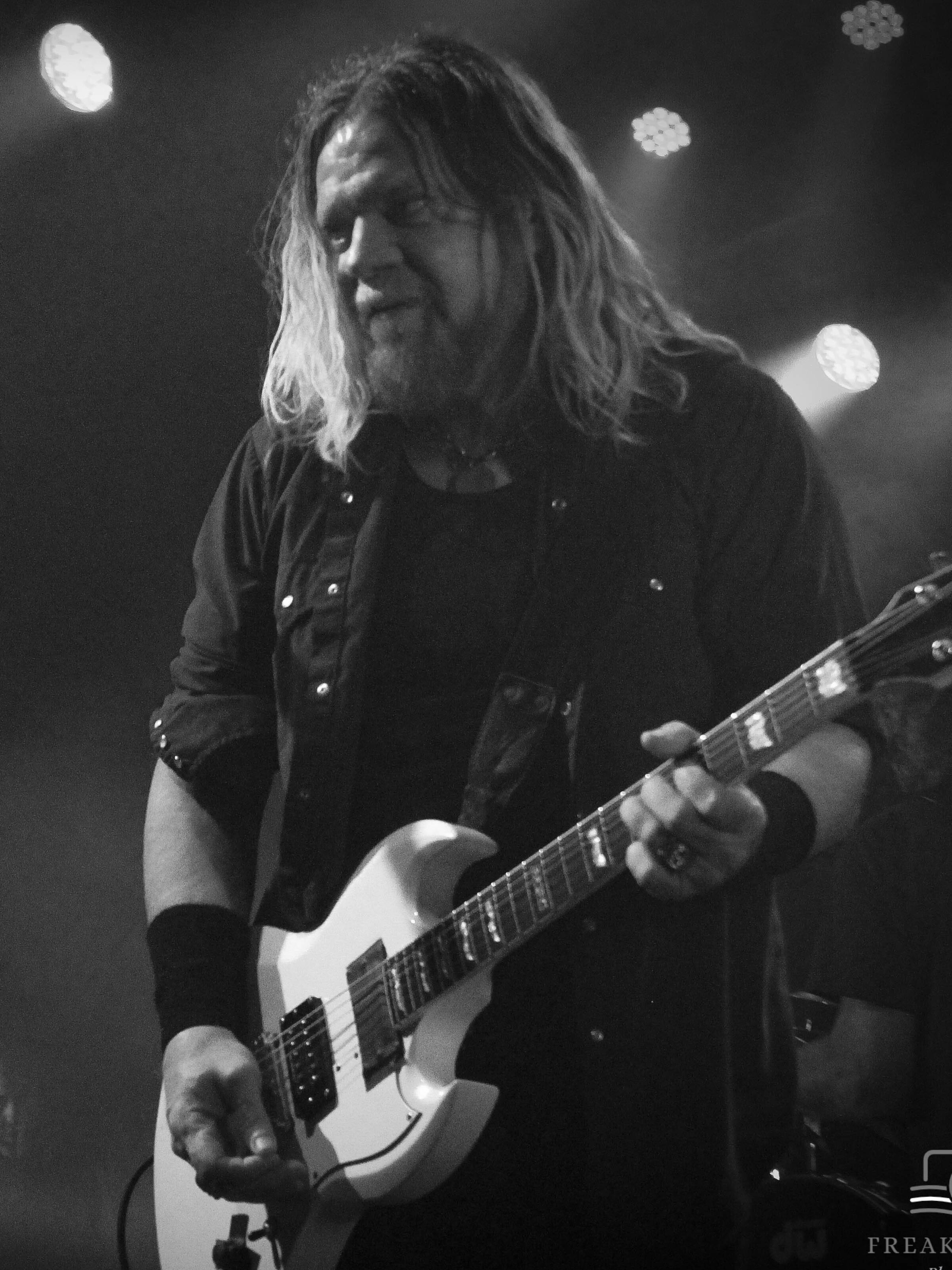
- Keenan performing with Corrosion of Conformity in 2023

Background information
- Born: Pepper J. Keenan; May 8, 1967 (age 59); Oxford, Mississippi, U.S.
- Genres: Southern metal; stoner metal; sludge metal
- Occupations: Musician; songwriter
- Instruments: Vocals; guitar
- Years active: 1989–present
- Member of: Corrosion of Conformity; Down

Pepper J. Keenan (born May 8, 1967) is an American guitarist and vocalist, best known for his work with heavy metal bands Corrosion of Conformity and Down. He joined Corrosion of Conformity in 1989, but did not become the lead singer until the recording of Deliverance in 1994. In 1991, Keenan formed Down with Phil Anselmo of Pantera, Jimmy Bower of Eyehategod, and Kirk Windstein and Todd Strange of Crowbar.

== Early life ==
Keenan was born in Oxford, Mississippi, but now lives in New Orleans, Louisiana, where he owns a bar named "Le Bon Temps Roule". His father, a former musician, was a local real estate appraiser in New Orleans. While developing his playing style in New Orleans, Pepper served as a member of local band Graveyard Rodeo, and met and became friends with Corrosion of Conformity during their frequent shows at the infamous Franklin Avenue VFW Hall in New Orleans.

== Career ==
=== Corrosion of Conformity ===
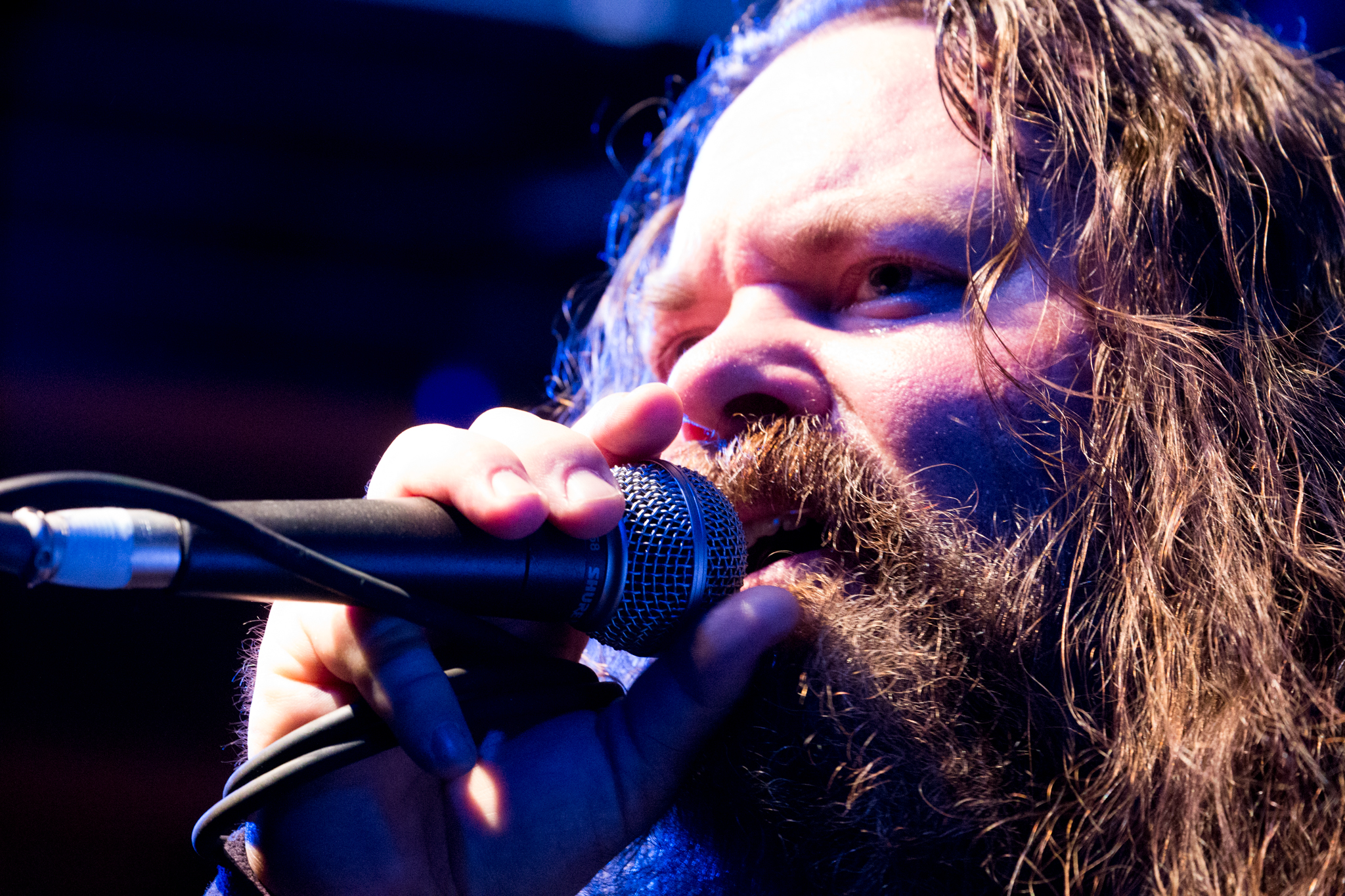
Keenan at 70000 Tons of Metal in 2015

Keenan joined Corrosion of Conformity in 1989. Corrosion of Conformity released their third album, Blind, with Keenan on rhythm guitar. After Karl Agell and Phil Swisher left the band (Swisher being replaced by original bassist Mike Dean), Keenan took over on vocals and guitar. Corrosion of Conformity have since released the albums Deliverance, Wiseblood, America's Volume Dealer, In the Arms of God, No Cross No Crown and Good God / Baad Man, as well as the live release Live Volume.

From 2006 to 2010, Corrosion of Conformity was on hiatus. The band later reunited and recorded two albums without Keenan, however, he rejoined the group in 2015 and they performed their first show with the reunited Deliverance-era lineup of Keenan, Woody Weatherman, Mike Dean, and Reed Mullin in March 2015 in Manchester, England. Their first U.S. tour with the reunited lineup, supporting Clutch, was announced in July 2015. No Cross No Crown, the bands latest album to date, was released in 2018 and features Keenan on vocals and guitar.

=== Down ===
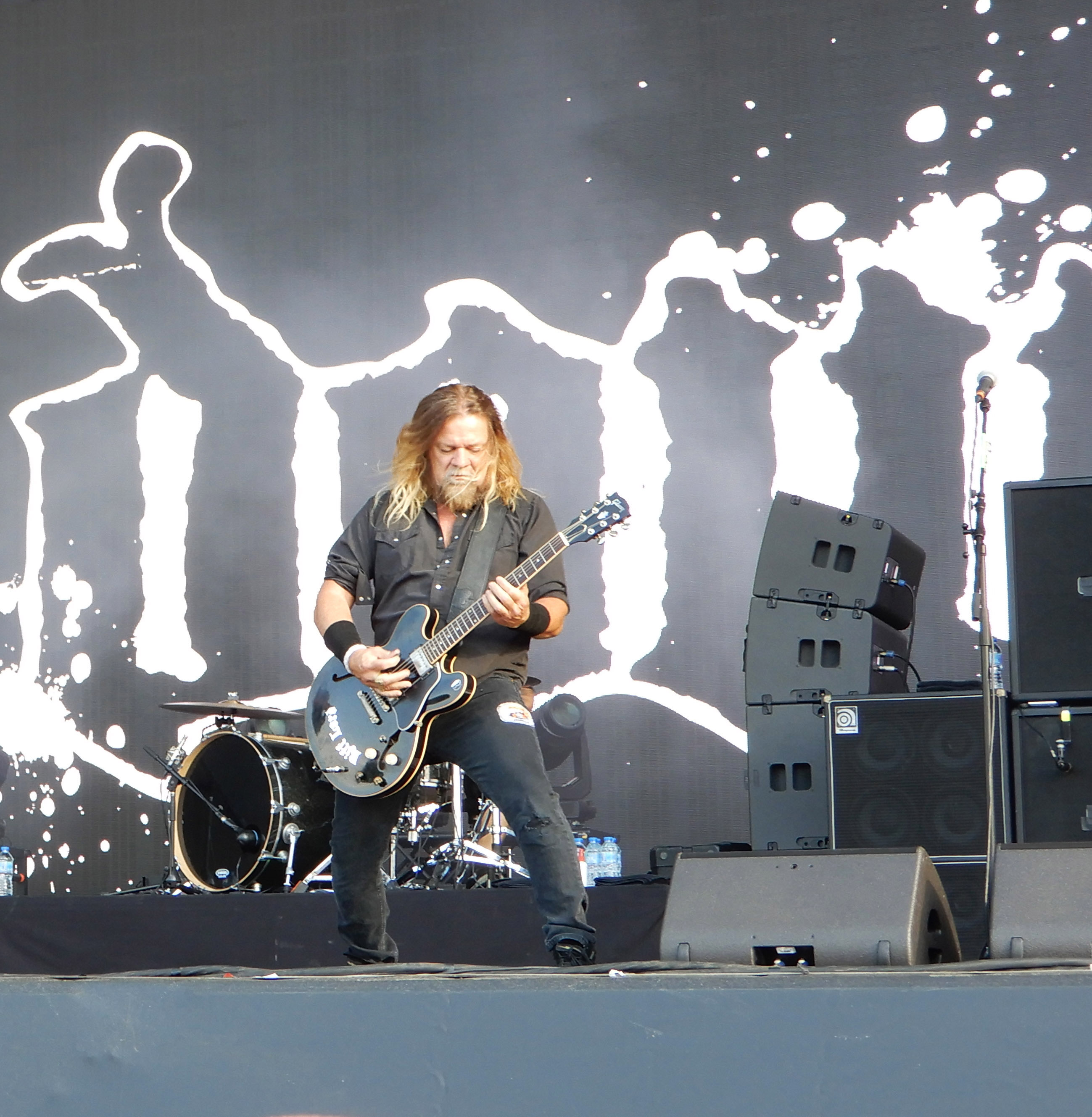
Keenan with Down at Hellfest 2022

Keenan was a founding member of Down in 1991 along with Pantera's Phil Anselmo, Eyehategod's Jimmy Bower, and Crowbar's Kirk Windstein and Todd Strange. In 1995, Down released their debut album, NOLA. The band went on indefinite hiatus in 1996 but returned three years later with Pantera bassist Rex Brown replacing Strange. In 2002, Down released their second album Down II: A Bustle in Your Hedgerow. Following a second hiatus, Down released their third album entitled Down III: Over the Under in 2007. Down released their fourth album Down IV Part I – The Purple EP in September 2012 and Down IV – Part II of a four-part series of EPs.

=== Collaborations with Metallica ===
Keenan plays guitar and sings a part of the second verse on Metallica's cover of the Lynyrd Skynyrd song "Tuesday's Gone". He also recorded a number of other songs in the same session, but this was the only one given a general release (on the album Garage Inc.), the others only being available as bootlegs. Keenan is good friends with lead singer and guitarist James Hetfield. Hetfield provided backing vocals on "Man or Ash" from Corrosion of Conformity's Wiseblood. Keenan auditioned for Metallica's vacant bass player position following Jason Newsted's departure from the band but lost out to former Suicidal Tendencies/Ozzy Osbourne bassist Robert Trujillo. Keenan's audition is shown in the Metallica documentary Metallica: Some Kind of Monster. In addition to his contribution to the song "Tuesday's Gone" Pepper also appeared with Metallica onstage at the Download Festival in Donington, England in 2006 along with Matt Heafy of Trivium to provide additional vocals on the song "Die, Die My Darling" (a Misfits cover). This song was played at the end of Metallica's headlining set.

== Personal life ==
Keenan became the father of a daughter named Flannery Rose Keenan with his longtime girlfriend Anna Hrnjak on January 5, 2010.

In a 2014 interview with Guitar.com, Keenan was asked about his thoughts on politics in which he responded "I mean, the Bible means a lot more to me than the Constitution and any fuckin' politics involved in this country or any other country." Keenan has been a critic of the Donald Trump presidency, as he noted at a 2016 concert. Originally disturbed by bandmate Phil Anselmo's behavior at the 2016 Dimebash, Keenan later accepted his apology in a February 4, 2016 Facebook post.

Keenan was featured with his 1955 Chevy "Gasser" in a television episode of Big Easy Motors.

== Discography ==
=== Corrosion of Conformity albums ===
Date of release	Title	Label	Chart positions
November 5, 1991	Blind	Relativity Records	
November 27, 1994	Deliverance	Columbia Records	155
October 12, 1996	Wiseblood	Columbia Records	104
October 10, 2000	America's Volume Dealer	Sanctuary Records	
August 7, 2001	Live Volume	Sanctuary Records	
April 5, 2005	In the Arms of God	Sanctuary Records	108
January 12, 2018	No Cross No Crown	Nuclear Blast	67
April 3, 2026	Good God / Baad Man	Nuclear Blast	

=== Down albums ===
Date of release	Title	Label	US Billboard peak
September 19, 1995	NOLA	Elektra	57
March 26, 2002	Down II: A Bustle in Your Hedgerow	Elektra	44
September 25, 2007	Down III: Over the Under	Warner Bros. Records	26
September 18, 2012	Down IV – Part I	Warner Bros. Records	35
May 13, 2014	Down IV – Part II	Warner Bros. Records	23
November 20, 2026	Volume V		
