= Reed Mullin =

American heavy metal drummer (1966–2020)

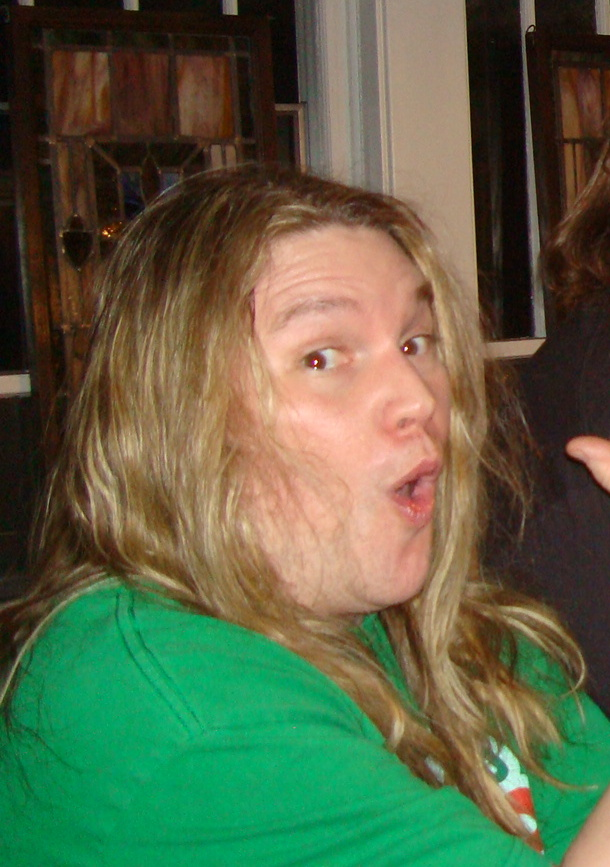
- Mullin in 2009

Background information
- Born: William Reed Mullin; February 12, 1966
- Origin: Raleigh, North Carolina, U.S.
- Died: January 27, 2020 (aged 53)
- Genres: Southern metal, stoner metal, sludge metal, crossover thrash, hardcore punk
- Occupation: Drummer
- Years active: 1982–2020
- Formerly of: Corrosion of Conformity, No Labels, Man Will Destroy Himself, Brown, Teenage Time Killers

William Reed Mullin (February 12, 1966 – January 27, 2020) was an American musician from Raleigh, North Carolina, best known as the co-founder and drummer of heavy metal band Corrosion of Conformity.

== Career ==
Mullin was a co-founding member of the band Corrosion of Conformity with Mike Dean and Woody Weatherman. In their earlier years, the band played hardcore punk, but transitioned in the direction of heavy metal with 1991's Blind, playing a style that incorporates elements of southern metal, sludge metal, and stoner metal. Mullin, along with Weatherman, also played in the Raleigh-based hardcore band No Labels. No Labels disbanded in 1984, while Corrosion of Conformity continued to evolve and gain popularity.

Mullin left Corrosion of Conformity on February 1, 2001, due to a back injury. Following his departure from Corrosion of Conformity, Mullin worked on several other projects, including as the frontman for power pop band Brown and drummer for hardcore band Man Will Destroy Himself. In 2010, Mullin would rejoin Corrosion of Conformity on drums, marking the reformation of the band's lineup from the Animosity era.

In 2014, Mullin co-founded the hardcore punk supergroup Teenage Time Killers with Corrosion of Conformity bandmate Mike Dean and My Ruin guitarist Mick Murphy. Other members included Foo Fighters frontman Dave Grohl, Lamb of God vocalist Randy Blythe, Stone Sour and Slipknot vocalist Corey Taylor, Bad Religion guitarist Brian Baker, former Queens of the Stone Age bassist Nick Oliveri, among others. Following Mullin's death in 2020, the band are presumed to have split-up.

== Death ==
On January 27, 2020, Mullin died at the age of 53. He had often missed shows in the four years prior to his death due to a variety of health issues, including an alcohol-related seizure he suffered in June 2016.

== Discography ==
=== Corrosion of Conformity ===
- Eye for an Eye (1984)
- Animosity (1985)
- Blind (1991)
- Deliverance (1994)
- Wiseblood (1996)
- America's Volume Dealer (2000)
- Corrosion of Conformity (2012)
- IX (2014)
- No Cross No Crown (2018)

=== Man Will Destroy Himself ===
- Consume...Be Silent....Die (2002)

=== Teenage Time Killers ===
- Greatest Hits Vol. 1 (2015)

=== Sourvein ===
- Aquatic Occult (2016; guest appearance)

=== Righteous Fool ===
- Righteous Fool (2022; drums)
