= Mike Dean (bassist) =

American bassist

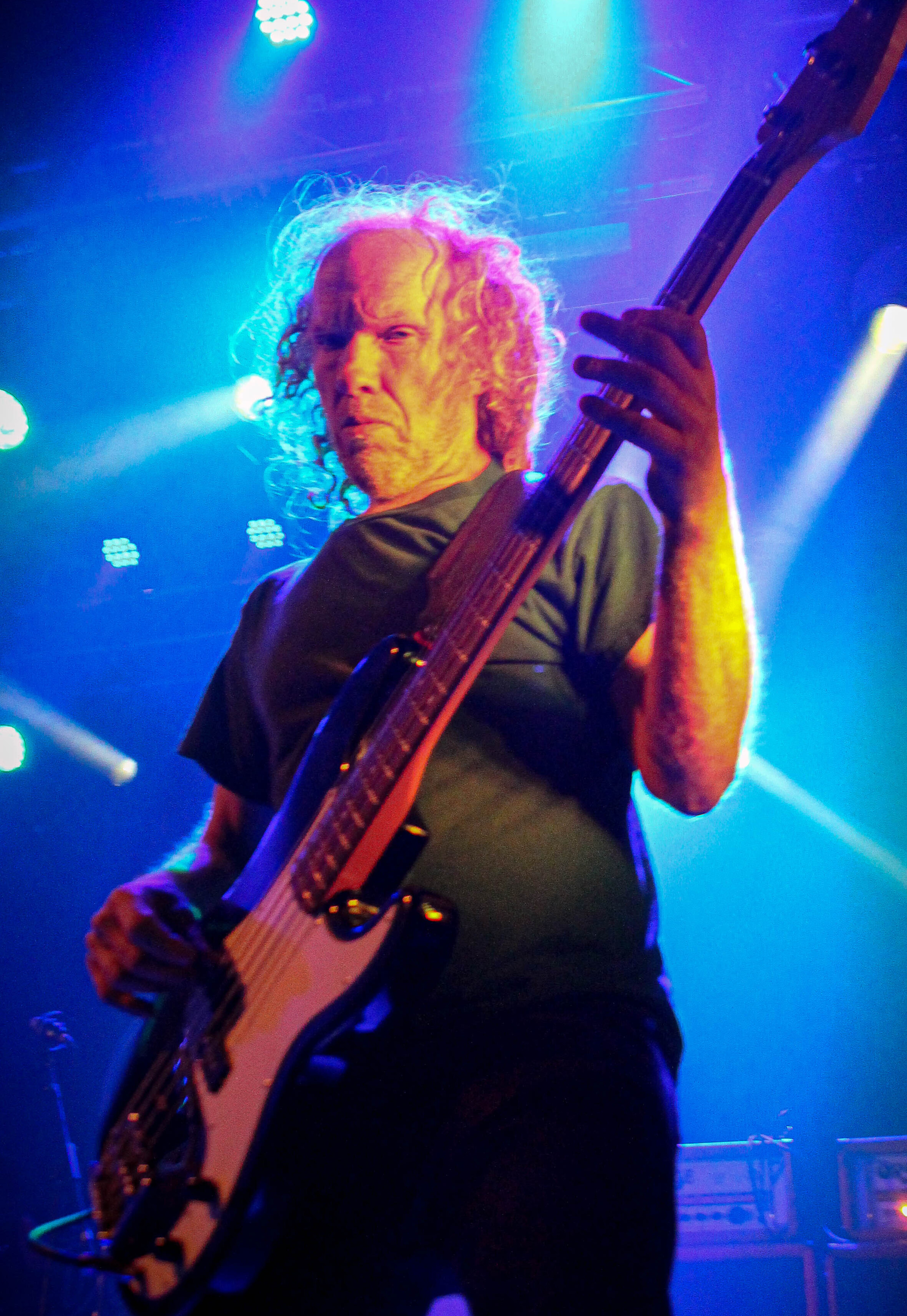
- Dean performing in 2023

Background information
- Born: Thomas Michael Dean; August 24, 1963 (age 63)
- Genres: Southern metal; stoner metal; sludge metal; crossover thrash
- Occupation: Musician
- Instruments: Bass; vocals
- Years active: 1982–present
- Member of: Lightning Born
- Formerly of: Corrosion of Conformity; Righteous Fool; Snake Nation; Vista Chino (touring)

Thomas Michael Dean (born August 24, 1963) is an American musician, best known as the former bassist and occasional vocalist of heavy metal band Corrosion of Conformity. He is also a member of Lightning Born, a four-piece out of Raleigh, North Carolina, formed in 2016.

== Career ==
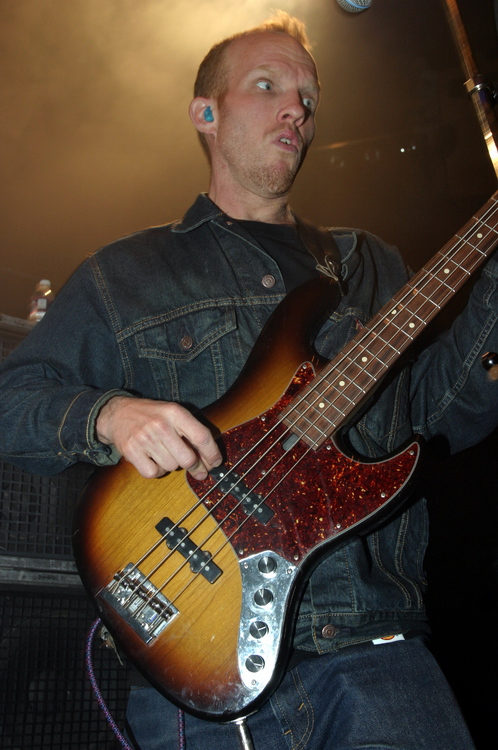
Dean in 2005

Dean sang on Corrosion of Conformity's early recordings from their crossover thrash era before leaving the band in 1987. In 1989, Dean, along with C.O.C. guitarist Woody Weatherman and Brian Walsby on drums, released the Snake Nation album via Caroline Records. Dean rejoined C.O.C. as the bassist and occasional vocalist in 1993 and remained with the band until 2024. From 2010 through 2020, the original lineup of Corrosion of Conformity consisting of Dean, Reed Mullin, and Woody Weatherman, were again performing and recording as a three-piece, until Mullin's death in 2020. In 2024, Dean announced that he was stepping away from Corrosion of Conformity to pursue new opportunities in music. In late 2025 Dean founded a new power trio based in Raleigh, North Carolina called Archaos.

Along with several production and engineering credits, Dean also collaborated with Dave Grohl on the Probot song "Access Babylon", a return to the punk/metal fusion of old. He was also the producer and engineer for Vampire Circus, an album by Maryland-based doom metal band Earthride released in 2005 by Southern Lord Records. He served as touring bassist for Vista Chino in 2013 and played bass on the song "As You Wish" on Vista Chino's 2013 album Peace.

== Discography ==
=== Albums ===
Release date	Title	Label
1984	Eye for an Eye	Caroline Records
October 1985	Animosity	Metal Blade Records
October 12, 1989	Snake Nation	Caroline Records
November 27, 1994	Deliverance	Sony Records
October 12, 1996	Wiseblood	Sony Records
October 10, 2000	America's Volume Dealer	Sanctuary Records
August 7, 2001	Live Volume	Sanctuary Records
February 10, 2004	Probot	Southern Lord
April 5, 2005	In the Arms of God	Sanctuary Records
February 28, 2012	Corrosion of Conformity	Candlelight Records
September 3, 2013	Peace	Napalm Records
June 24, 2014	IX	Candlelight Records
January 12, 2018	No Cross No Crown	Nuclear Blast Records
June 21, 2019	Lightning Born	Ripple Music

=== EPs ===
Release date	Title	Label
1987	Technocracy	Metal Blade Records
1989	Six Songs With Mike Singing: 1985	Metal Blade Records
2013	Megalodon	Scion/AV

=== Compilations ===
- No Core (1982, split)
- Why Are We Here? (1983, split)
- Cleanse the Bacteria (1985, compilation)
- Complete Death (1985, compilation) (Metal Blade Records)

=== Music videos ===
- "Albatross" (1994)
- "Clean My Wounds" (1994)
- "Wiseblood" (1996)
- "Drowning in a Daydream" (1996)
- "Live Volume" (DVD) (2001)
- "Stonebreaker" (2005)
- "Psychic Vampire" (2012)
- "The Moneychangers" (2012)
- "Feed On" (2013)
