= Flat Duo Jets =

American rock band

- Romweber and Crow

Background information
- Origin: Carrboro, North Carolina, U.S.
- Genres: Rockabilly; punk blues; garage rock; psychobilly
- Years active: 1983–1999
- Labels: Norton Records Third Man Records; Outpost/Geffen Records; Dog Gone Records Dolphin Records
- Past members: Dexter Romweber; Chris "Crow" Smith; Tone Mayer; Crash LaResh; Derek Huston; Alan MacEwen

Flat Duo Jets was an American rock band from Carrboro, North Carolina, and Athens, Georgia. This rockabilly, punk blues, and psychobilly band was a major influence on several bands of the 1990s and 2000s, including The White Stripes. The band's front man Dexter Romweber is considered by many to be the "godfather" of the guitar and drums-based "power duo" revival.

== History ==
Flat Duo Jets formed in Carrboro, North Carolina, in 1983. Their original line-up was Dexter Romweber on guitar and Chris “Crow” Smith on drums—both were seventeen years old at the time. Romweber and Smith met in fifth grade; by junior high school they had founded a band called The Remains which lasted for a year.

Romweber and Smith organized Flat Duo Jets in 1984 when they were in high school. Romweber played guitar and sang lead vocals, while Smith played drums. In the beginning, they performed songs they learned from the Romweber family's collection of 1950s records. They were also influenced by The Cramps. The band's name was a reference to the 1951 Gretsch Duo-Jet guitar which was used by Gene Vincent. The Gretsch Duo-Jet also gave the band its aesthetic: "sleek and black, calling back to the old days, but still progressive." However, Romweber played a cheap black and white Silvertone 1448 guitar sold by Sears, without effects pedals. Smith said, "With just drums and guitar, you're more free to do what you feel. It keeps us from getting bored."

The group practiced in "The Moz” or The Mausoleum, their nickname for the garage located behind the Romweber house. The Moz was decorated to resemble The Addams Family's house. Romweber said, "I had this place behind my mother's house, The Mausoleum, and that's where we formed the Jets. It was this campy '40s horror kind of place. Gothic, but not English neo-gothic—more like The Addams Family—and that's what we tried to make Flat Duo Jets." The Moz was pictured on the cover of their first album and was also visited by MTV's The Cutting Edge in 1985.

Flat Duo Jets played in the Raleigh, Durham, and Chapel Hill, North Carolina, area, as well as in Athens, Georgia. Both their music and Romweber's stage presence attracted the attention of audiences. About Romweber, one critic noted, "His face contorted and his eyes rolled back in his head. He frothed, jogged in place and swung his body as if temporarily freed from gravity. People thought he was possessed..." Another noted they sounded like "an edgy blend of blues, jazz, surf, and Sun Studio's white thrash."

The band decided to relocate to Athens, Georgia, for three months. Romweber says, "We moved down there for a year because we were playing gigs down there and we were getting a good reception and it seemed like a happening town so we docked there for like a year." While in Athens, the band made an appearance in the documentary film Athens, GA: Inside/Out, alongside other well-known Athens bands such as R.E.M. and The B–52's. Director Tony Gayton filmed the band at a University of Georgia fraternity party and "still holds it as one of the greatest shows he's ever seen."

Flat Duo Jets were called "musical carpetbaggers" because they were not from Athens; many believe they moved to Georgia to be in the film. Regardless, Spin magazine noted, "Dexter wasn't technically a local, but they put him in Athens, Ga. Inside/Out anyway. He stampeded across a rickety frat house stage, gutting his Silvertone for bastard rockabilly licks against Crow's intemperate rhythm...His reckless performances made the rest of the Athens music scene—R.E.M., the B-52's, Pylon—seem pale." The band eventually toured the United States in support of the documentary, along with BBQ Killers and Kilkenny Cats.

Back in North Carolina, Tone Mayer joined the band on stand-up bass in 1988. Mayer first played with Romweber in 1979, and helped form Crash Landon and the Kamakazis in 1982 with Romweber and his sister Sarah Romweber. The trio version of Flat Duo Jets recorded their first release, In Stereo, live at home and in local studios. This six-song EP was released on cassette by the local record label Dolphin Records. After hearing the EP, Duke University student Derek Huston was interested in playing with the band, and started joining them for some shows on tenor saxophone. Alan MacEwen also would play trumpet with the band for many shows.

In early September 1988, the band signed with Dog Gone Records, an independent label co-owned by Jefferson Holt, former manager of R.E.M. The contract was for three albums for Romweber, with an option for five more if Dog Gone decided to distribute the recordings. It was announced that the band would be in the studio in October 1988, working on an album to be released in February 1989. In February 1990, the band played at CBGB in New York City.

Recorded in the late 1980s, their 1990 LP, Flat Duo Jets, was recorded direct to two tracks, with no overdubs, in a garage with producer Mark Bingham. It included two original songs and twelve covers from the 1950s and 1960s. They celebrated the release of the album on September 9, 1989, at the Cat's Cradle in Chapel Hill, along with Romweber's sister's band Snatches of Pink who were also releasing a new album with Dog Gone Records. However, the Flat Duo Jets actual release and distribution was delayed by internal issues at Dog Gone Records. One reviewer noted, "The 14 tracks sizzle like a backwoods bonfire, Dex, Crow, and Tone playing with spontaneity and inspired abandon throughout. ...Flat Duo Jets makes every early Stray Cats sound like the polished work of a few silly poseurs."

In 1990, Romweber gave up drinking, women, and drugs to focus on making the band a success. That year, Flat Duo Jets opened for The Cramps on the three-month Stay Sick tour of the United States. Romweber recalls, "Well, it was a long tour for us. It was a lot of work, you know, playing like six nights a week, 55 minutes sets in big halls and hitting about every major city in the U.S. There was no time to think, you know, just get up and go. It was a lot of work." On July 13, 1990, the band made "a career-making" appearance on Late Night with David Letterman, where they performed a cover of Benny Joy's "Wild Wild Lover." However, Mayer left the group in 1990.

Their second LP, 1991's Go Go Harlem Baby, was produced by Jim Dickinson at Easley McCain Recording in Memphis, Tennessee. In 1994, the band toured with The Reverend Horton Heat. Crash LaResh replaced Crow on drums, on and off, starting in 1995. The band toured in Europe for ten days in 1996. In 1998, they again toured with The Reverend Horton Heat.

In the late 1990s, Flat Duo Jets signed a major label contract with Outpost Records, a now-defunct imprint of Geffen Records. Scott Litt agreed to work with the band at the suggestion of R.E.M.'s Peter Buck. The result was 1998's Lucky Eye, produced by both Litt and Chris Stamey, which demonstrated a markedly different approach from their previous lo-fi efforts. The album featured a more polished sound for the band, with some tracks accompanied by string arrangements. Tom Maxwell and Ken Mosher of the Squirrel Nut Zippers played horns on some tracks.

The band was disappointed by poor album sales, and Dexter and Crow went separate ways shortly after the release of Lucky Eye. Dexter maintains that the primary reason for the split was embezzlement of the band's proceeds on the part of Crow, though Crow disputes this. It has also been said that the band was "plagued by naiveté and drug-usage." Romweber acknowledges, "I think that when I was young I was pretty naive to the pitfalls of being in the business... In being a touring band, it's not the easiest thing often. You know, many things can break down either in yourself or with other people or both simultaneously. So for myself, I had struggles I was working to overcome. And then for "Crow he had struggles that he was working to overcome.... But the dynamics in the band were already breaking down." Either way, the band called it quits in 1999.

The documentary Dexter Romweber: Two Headed Cow was released in 2006. It included footage of Flat Duo Jets playing while on tour in 1986 or 1987 Two Headed Cow was made by Tony Gayton, who also directed Athens, GA: Inside/Out in 1987. He started making the film twenty years earlier but ran short on funding.

In 2008, a live soundtrack to Two Headed Cow was released. In 2011, Jack White reissued Go Go Harlem Baby on Third Man Records. In 2011, Daniel 13, the label run by former R.E.M. manager Jefferson Holt, released Flat Duo Jets' Wild Wild Love, a box set that included their self-titled 1990 album, the Inside Out EP, their David Letterman performance, the Athens, GA.: Inside/Out performances, and outtakes. The box set also included a 78-page booklet depicting early concert fliers, photos, and history by David Menconi, music critic for The News and Observer.

== Post-breakup bands ==
After Flat Duo Jets, Mayer joined The Chicken Wire Gang, also known as Good Old Chicken Wire Gang Boys Band Brothers. Smith released their debut solo album, Songs for Emeline, in 2006.

Romweber pursued a solo career, touring with Cat Power, Squirrel Nut Zippers, Neko Case, and others. LaResh continued to drum with Dexter full-time from 1999 to 2005. Romweber created the Dex Romweber Duo in 2006 with his older sister, Sarah, on drums. They performed and record together through 2013.

== Reunion ==
In 2016, Romweber and LaResh released the Our Night at the Great Jones as the Dex & Crash Revival. The album was recorded live at during Blackbeard's Lost Weekender at The Nightlight in Chapel Hill, North Carolina and featured songs previously recorded by Dex Romweber, the Dex Romweber Duo, and Flat Duo Jets.

In 2016, Dex & Crash booked a tour in Spain, but the promoters wanted them to tour as Flat Duo Jets. Romweber agreed, but it was a reunion "in name only." During that tour, Rowmweber and Crash appeared as The Flat Duo Jets on The Furious Sessions at Sol de Sants Studios in Barcelona, Spain. They performed the song "Dark Night."

In 2017, Romweber was offered a gig with The Reverend Horton Heat, but only if he would perform using the Flat Duo Jets name. That same year, he booked a few other shows under the band's name, but he was the only original member performing.

== Activism ==
In April 1986, the Flat Duo Jets played in a benefit for the North Carolina Radioactive Waste Watch.

== Impact ==
When writing about Flat Duo Jets, music critic David Menconi said, "Their biggest fans have always been other musicians."

Jack White, the leader singer and guitarist of The White Stripes, has often acknowledged their influence. The White Stripes organized like Flat Duo Jets, with just a drummer and guitarist. They also copied Flat Duo Jets "monochromatic color schemes, affinity for cheap plastic guitars, and simple, old-school songwriting..." In the documentary It Might Get Loud, White plays Flat Duo Jets' recording of the traditional "Froggie Went A-Courtin'" and discusses the impact that the band had on him. He also said he owned all of the Flat Duo Jets albums when he was a teenager. In addition, The White Stripes used to cover Flat Duo Jet's "You Belong to Me" or "Apple Blossom Time" in their live shows. White said that Romweber is "one of the best-kept secrets of the rock and roll underground."

In 2013, the Dex Romweber Duo opened for Jack White in Boston. White collaborated with Romweber and Sara Romweber to record a 7” record at his Third Man Records studio in Nashville, Tennessee. White said, "You have no idea how long I’ve waited to hear that guitar tone in my studio."

Flat Duo Jets also influenced The Black Keys, Neko Case, and Exene Cervenka of X. Cervenka says, "He [Romweber] is classic, timeless, transcendent, pure. He has a talent few people will ever have." Chan Marshall of Cat Power chose a Sears Silvertone for her first guitar because Romweber played that model.

== Members ==
- Dexter Romweber, guitar
- Chris "Crow" Smith, drums
- Griz "Tone" Mayer, stand-up bass (1988–1990)
- Crash LaFresh, drums (1995–1999)
- Eric Peterson, electric guitar (studio and touring band, 1998)
- Aaron Oliva, stand-up bass (touring band, 1998)

== Discography ==
=== EP and 7" ===
- In Stereo (1985, Dolphin Records)
- "I'll Have A Merry Christmas Without You"/ "Caravan" 7" (1994, Norton Records)
- Dexmas 7" (1996, Permanent Records)
- Jet Set 7" (1996, Norton Records)

=== LP ===
- Flat Duo Jets (1990, Dog Gone Records)
- Go Go Harlem Baby (1991, Sky Records; 2011, Third Man Records)
- Safari (1993, Norton Records)
- White Trees (1993, Sky Records)
- Introducing the Flat Duo Jets (1995, Norton Records)
- Red Tango (1996, Norton Records)
- Wild Blue Yonder (1998, Norton Records)
- Lucky Eye (1998, Outpost Records)
- Two Headed Cow (2008, Chicken Ranch Records)
- Wild Wild Love (2017, Daniel 13)

=== With other artists ===
- Gene Maltais & the Flat Duo Jets – "Voodoo Woman"/"Little Girl" (1994, Norton Records)

== Other media ==
=== Television ===
- I.R.S. Records Presents The Cutting Edge (1985, MTV)
- 120 Minutes (1990, MTV)
- Late Night with David Letterman (1990, NBC)

=== Film ===
- Athens, GA: Inside Out (1986)
- Dexter Romweber: Two Headed Cow (2006)
- It Might Get Loud (2009)

=== Video ===
- "Wild, Wild Lover" (1990)
- "Radioactive Man" (1993)
- "Dark Night" (2016, The Furious Sessions)
