= Michael Rank (musician) =

American musician

- Also known as: Mike Rank; Rank
- Born: Michael Rankow; Manhattan, New York, U.S.
- Origin: Chapel Hill, North Carolina, U.S.
- Genres: Rock; Lo-fi rock; Americana; Folk rock; Neo soul; Retro soul
- Instruments: acoustic guitar; clavinet; drum machine; electric; guitar; keyboards; piano; organ; synthesizer
- Years active: 1985 -
- Labels: Caroline Records; Loud Hymns; Mammoth Records; MoRisen Records
- Formerly of: Snatches of Pink; Clarissa; Marat; Michael Rank and Stag
- Members: Brian Dennis Bobby Patterson Rayney Hayes
- Past members: Ron Bartholomew Jeff Crawford; Billie Feather; Nathan Golub; Skylar Gudasz; John Howie Jr. Jesse Huebner; Alex Inglehart; Heather McEntire; Gabriele Pelli; Sara Romweber; Freddie Salem; Mark E. Smith; Tim Smith; John Teer; James A. Wallace Daryl White
- Website: www.michaelrankmusic.com

Michael Rank, born as Michael Rankow, is an American musician and singer-songwriter from Chatham County, North Carolina. He was a founding member of Snatches of Pink and Clarissa, but is now a solo artist.

== Early life ==
Rank was born in Manhattan, New York. He was raised in Katonah, New York, but moved to Chapel Hill, North Carolina when he was twelve-years-old in 1977.

The first concert he attended was the Nitty Gritty Dirt Band when he was nine or ten. The next concert he attended Kiss at Madison Square Gardens. He says he slept through part of the first concert, but of the latter, he says, "That one changed my life."

Rank started playing guitar in 1985. His preferred guitar in 1990 was a Gibson Firebird.

== Career ==
=== Snatches of Pink ===
Rank's band, Snatches of Pink, formed in Chapel Hill, North Carolina in 1985 with Andy McMillan on vocals and bass guitar and Sara Romweber (Let's Active) on drums. Rank played guitar, wrote the songs, and eventually took on lead vocals. Although the band started as a punk-rock ode to The Rolling Stones and The Replacements, they eventually transitioned to a mix of acoustic music that was influenced by Led Zeppelin's song "Tangerine."

Snatches of Pink went through a series of labels that included Dog Gone, Hollywood Records, Caroline Records, and Mammoth Records, recording for the latter using the name Clarissa. They were considered one of the best bands in North Carolina of the era, but never reached bigger success despite opening for The Cramps, Iggy Pop, Ramones, Soul Asylum, Soundgarden, and Steppenwolf. However, throughout, "Rank in particular had a British rock star thing going for him, part Keef, part Nikki Sudden, part Hanoi Rocks, what with his penchant for tight pants, flowing shirts and colorful scarves."

When the band fizzled in 2007, Rank was its only remaining original member. Rank says, "We came close to the success we were after but at the end of the day no cigar."

=== Marat ===
During downtime from Snatches of Pink in 2003, Rank formed the band Marat with John Ensslin (Teasing the Korean, What Peggy Wants). Ensslin was on vocals and wrote the lyrics, while Rank played guitar and composed the music. Other members of Marat included Desmond White (The Veldt) on bass and Marvin Levi (The Veldt) on drums. Scott Carle (Collapsis, Dillon Fence) replaced Levi on drums by the time the band recorded its albums. Marat released two albums, the self-titled first album in 2003 and Again in 2005. Both albums were on MoRisen Records.

=== Michael Rank solo ===
Rank released his first solo album, Coral, on Caroline Records in 1993. Although his original goal for Coral was a stripped down Cat Stephens kind of album, this changed in the studio to include Sara Romweber (Snatches of Pink) on drums and Freddie Salem (The Chamber Brothers, Outlaws) on bass. Salem also produced Coral. Of the album, one critic wrote it is "dreamy and gorgeous and bursting at the seams with plangent guitars and no shortage of 12-string flourishes."

=== Michael Rank and Stag ===
In 2010, Rank started performing and recording with a shifting lineup of musicians under the name Michael Rank and Stag. With this group, Rank explored his acoustic side, becoming increasingly of an Americana artist. For live shows, he worked with whoever was available for the date, resulting in mixtures bands that were two-piece, three-piece, five-piece, or more. The Americana Music Show said, "Michael Rank & Stag are creating some of the most interesting twangy rock & roll being created today."

Michael Rank and Stag's first album, Kin, was released in 2012. This recording was "intimate and mostly acoustic, smoldering instead of scorching." The album's backing band included both Sara Romweber (Snatches of Pink, Let's Active, Dex Romweber Duo) and John Howie Jr. (Snatches of Pink, John Howie & The Rosewood Bluff, Finger, Two Dollar Pistols) on drums, Alex Inglehart (Love, Claire) on electric guitar, Marc E. Smith (Snatches of Pink, 34 Satellite, Patty Hurst Shifter) on lap steel guitar and keyboards, John Teer (Chatham County Line) on fiddle and mandolin, and Daryl White (Trailer Bride) on upright bass. Rank provided lead vocals, electric and acoustic guitar, and piano. He also wrote all of the songs, produced, and mixed the album. With a lineup that overlapped with Rank's previous projects, one reviewer wrote that Kin "was inconclusive, its brooding, boozy acoustoelectrica sounding so much like the great SOP [Snatches of Pink] album Bent With Pray that one wondered if he changed the name just avoid any previous negative associations."

Kin was the first of six albums the group released in the next four years. Almost all of the tracks in this cycle are introspective, dark, and raw songs about the breakup on the relationship with the mother of his son. For In the Weeds in 2013, Howie, Inglehart, Teer, and Smith returned. Other musicians on the album included Emily Frantz (Mandolin Orange) on vocals, Nathan Golub (John Howie Jr. and the Rosewood Bluff) on pedal steel guitar and banjo, Billie Feather and Jesse Huebner (Pattie Hurst Shifter) on bass. One reviewer noted, "Like a slow descent into hell, the despair of In the Weeds is relentless. …Despite the despair, In the Weeds documents Rank's woes with meticulous craft."

Also released in 2013, Mermaids again featured Feather, Golub, Huebner, Smith, and Teer, along with Ron Bartholomew (The Accelerators, The Hanks, The Woods) on mandolin, Greg Rice (Terry Anderson and The OAK Team) on piano, and Scott David Phillips on accordion. With Mermaids, "Rank fully hits his stride as a solo artist."

For 2014's Deadstock, Rank again recorded with Bartholomew, Feather, Golub, Huebner, Inglehart, and Teer. Gabriele Pelli (The Old Ceremony) was added on fiddle, along with Chip Robinson (The Backsliders) on vocals, and Skylar Gudasz on vocals.

For Horsehair in 2015, Rank collaborated with singer Heather McEntire (Mount Moriah) who provided harmony vocals. In addition to McEntire, Stag included Bartholomew, Golub, Howie, Huebner, Inglehart, Peli, and James A. Wallace (Phil Cook Band) on organ. Of Horsehair, a reviewer wrote, "It’s both simple and beautiful, because Rank and his band address complicated emotions directly. No flair. Acoustic guitar, mandolin, violin, and two voices. No affectations. The songs sound and feel lived in and broken in, from a band worn a little down but not out."

To record 2016's Red Hand, Rank reunited with McEntire on vocals, as well as Bartholomew, Golub, Pelli, Teer, and Wallace. New additions to Stag included Jeff Crawford (Dead Tongues) on bass and Tim Smith (The Jumpstarts) on saxophone. Despite the return of so many of his collaborative musicians, Rank dropped the name Stag on this album. However, as one reviewer noted, "Heather’s the perfect foil and sings as an equal on what is billed as a solo album but is essentially an album of duets."

=== Michael Rank ===
Just as Rank seemed to settle into Americana, he pivoted to neo soul. He says, "I have no interest in writing the same sad-ass Country song for my entire life. Or the same out-of-tune Johnny Thunders song again and again. And don’t get me wrong—I love that shit dearly, but there are plenty of folks already spending a lifetime doing that."

To achieve this new sound, Rank collaborated with Brian Dennis, formerly of DAG. The result was Another Love in 2017 which is a combination of retro-soul and lo-fi rock that was inspired by D’Angelo, Marvin Gaye, Curtis Mayfield, Sly Stone, and Prince. Rank says, "What was cool about this album for me, and unlike any other I’ve ever written, was that every single song started out from a beat of some old 60’s or 70’s drum machine I had at my house. Starting with the Rhythm King and Rhythm Ace, and then I became obsessed with the sound of the old Korg SR-120. And here lately I’m writing most everything with the Korg Rhythm-55 and the CR78. And most all of it I grabbed from eBay auctions." Not only did he write the songs for Another Love on keyboards, Rank says he did not touch a guitar in over a year.

Another unique aspect of this recording was that it was a triple album. Rank says, "It actually started out as a normal-length album. I had the 9 or 10 tracks I was digging, but then during the recording sessions I just kept writing. And writing. And writing. So we just kept recording. …It got to the point where we were like, man, this could actually be a double album now; and then, fast forward a couple of months later and it was, man, this could actually be a triple album now. If they hadn’t cut me off we’d be looking at a box set."

For the recording sessions, he called on some previous collaborators: Bartholomew played bass and Smith played flute and saxophone. Rank played clavinet, keyboards, Korg synthesizer, organ, electric piano, as well as vocals. Brian Dennis played a range of instruments, including Arp Odyssey, Arp String Ensemble, clavinet, Glockenspiel, guitar, mini Moog synthesizer, organ, percussion, piano, synthesizer, synthesizer strings, talk box, and Wah Wah guitar. In addition, Raney Hayes provided vocals.

After listening to Another Love, a reviewer for Soulhead wrote, "Like a combination of Curtis Mayfield and the Black Keys, the chill sound of that record got in my bones." A reviewer from public radio noted, "There's a lot to like about these songs, including Brian Dennis's guitar playing. But the primitive drum machines holding down the rhythm make for a stark sound in the middle of all that instrumental and vocal warmth."

In 2018, Rank released another album that continued his collaboration with Dennis, I Fell in Love with You Tonight. On this album, Raney Hayes returns with added vocals and Bobby Patterson (DAG) played bass.

=== Dust Hand Sessions ===
Rank had a show called Dust Hand Session on WCOM radio every Friday morning from 10 to 11 a.m. The show went off the air in August 2018.

== CXCW ==
Rank made a video of "Bring You Up" for Couch by Couch West (CXCW) in 2013. It featured Rank on acoustic guitar and Ron Bartholomew on mandolin. For CXCW 2014, he recorded a video of "Coming Hard" from the back of a pickup truck that was driving around Carrboro, North Carolina. The video also featured Bartholomew on mandolin and Gabriele Pelli on fiddle. For his 2015 CXCW entry, he performed a cover of The Felice Brothers' song "Her Eyes Dart Around" with Bartholomew. Of the hundreds of entries, Rank's was placed in the top ten by Twangville. In addition, Couch by Couchwest selected it as the "Best Lo-Fi Video."

== Personal life ==
Rank lives in a modernist home on 50 acres between Carrboro and Pittsboro, North Carolina. He purchased the property in 1990 with money he made from a publishing deal with Warner Bros. He and his former partner have a son named Bowie Ryder. Having a son motivated Rank to stop touring, writing, and playing. He said, "I stayed with it longer than most but then when the day came that I became a father I just didn’t want to get in the tour van anymore and miss any of my new son’s life."

When his partner of seven years left in 2010, Rank says the music began to flow again. However, in 2017, he said, "No plans for any gigging this year. What fulfills me the most is writing songs and creating in the studio. That’s where I’m feeling the most alive. In a perfect world, I woulda dug doing a handful of cool dates but the time and expense involved in putting together a new band is just not where my focus is at right now."

== Discography ==
=== Michael Rank ===
- Coral (Caroline Records, 1993)
- Red Hand (Loud Hymns, 2016)
- Another Love (Loud Hymns, 2017)
- I Fell in Love with You Tonight (Loud Hymns, 2018)

=== Michael Rank and Stag ===
- Kin (Loud Hymns, 2012)
- In the Weeds (Loud Hymns, 2013)
- Mermaids (Loud Hymns, 2013)
- Deadstock (Loud Hymns, 2014)
- Horsehair (Loud Hymns, 2015)

=== Marat ===
- Marat (MoRisen Records, 2003)
- Again (MoRisen Records, 2005)

=== Snatches of Pink ===
- Send in the Clowns (Dog Gone Records, 1987)
- Dead Men (Sky Record, 1989)
- Bent with Pray (Caroline Distribution, 1992)
- Hyena (MoRisen Records, 2003)
- Stag (MoRisen Records, 2005)
- Love Is Dead (8th House, 2007)

=== Clarissa ===
- Silver (Mammoth, 1996)
- Blood & Commons (Mammoth, 1997)

== Filmography ==
- Now It's a Rock & Roll Show!!! A film about Snatches of Pink (Trickle Down Productions, 2007)

=== Movie soundtracks as Clarissa ===
- "Apology" – Brink! (1998)

=== Movie soundtracks as Morat ===
- "Rise and Fall" – Right at Your Door (2006)

=== Television soundtracks as Snatches as Pink ===
- "Dance" – "The Party," Wildfire (ABC Family, August 15, 2005)
- "Judus" – Wildfire (ABC Family, 2006)

=== Movie soundtracks as Snatches of Pink ===
- "Otto Wood' – At Middleton (2013)
- "Dance" – Waiting... (2005)
