= Lucky Eye =

Studio album by Flat Duo Jets
- Released: October 6, 1998
- Studio: Muscle Shoals
- Genre: Rock and roll
- Label: Outpost
- Producer: Scott Litt, Chris Stamey

Flat Duo Jets chronology
Wild Blue Yonder (1998)	Lucky Eye (1998)	Two Headed Cow (2007)

Lucky Eye is an album by the American band Flat Duo Jets, released on October 6, 1998. It was the band's first album for a major label. They supported it with a North American tour that included Reverend Horton Heat and the Amazing Crowns and with an appearance on NPR's World Cafe.

== Production ==
Recorded at Muscle Shoals Sound Studio, the album was produced by label head Scott Litt and Chris Stamey; Peter Buck had encouraged Litt to sign and work with the band. Stamey also cowrote three of the songs and played bass on most of the tracks. Tom Maxwell and Ken Mosher of the Squirrel Nut Zippers contributed on horns. The band used a 12-piece string section on several tracks. Flat Duo Jets had written most of the songs prior to the recording sessions and had to adapt to the extra instrumentation. "New York Studio 1959" refers to frontman Dexter Romweber's opinion that 1959 was the year that many musicians expanded the scope of their music by exploring the possibilities of the recording studio. Chris "Crow" Smith's drum solo on "Rockin' Mode" is a tribute to Gene Krupa. "Virginia Surf" and "Creepin' Invention" are instrumentals. "Sharks Flying In" is a tale about Romweber's girlfriend being snatched by sharks from outer space.

== Critical reception ==
Professional ratings
Review scores
Source	Rating
Alternative Rock	6/10
Boston Herald	3/4 stars
The Boston Phoenix	3.5/4 stars
Dayton Daily News	A
The Encyclopedia of Popular Music	3/5 stars
The Evening Post	4/5 stars
Lincoln Journal Star	3.5/5 stars
Pittsburgh Post-Gazette	3/4 stars
The Tampa Tribune	2/4 stars
Winnipeg Sun	4/5 stars

The Washington Post said that Romweber is "still rooted in the '50s, but he finally gets a chance to try out the orchestral ballads and cool jazz he has always loved... And those understated moments provide a contrast that makes the frenzied eruptions all the more effective." The Evening Post opined that, "unlike the Cramps, Rev Horton Heat and other comical reborn rockabillies, the Jets' songs sound so authentic—right down to fuzzy amps, brushed drums and period strings". The Morning Call stated that "if there must be imitation-retro music, let it sound like Lucky Eye."

The Lincoln Journal Star called the album "classic escapist rock 'n' roll with absolutely no redeeming social value." The Star Tribune stated that the band "can still sound cheerfully raw and primitive... You can't clean up Romweber's hangdog, flat-as-pancakes vocals, or take the razor's edge off his guitar." Tulsa World concluded that the sound is not "cutesy revivalism but a serious, spirited approach to the music, wringing emotion from the songs instead of perfecting an historical recreation." The Ithaca Journal listed Lucky Eye as the second best album of 1998.

AllMusic critic Matthew Robinson noted that some of the songs on the album are "repetitive and underdeveloped", concluding that "no one may ever bring back the golden age of rock & roll, it's good to know people are still trying."

== Track listing ==
No.	Title	Length
1.	"Lucky Eye"
2.	"String Along"
3.	"Go This Way"
4.	"Virginia Surf"
5.	"Dark Night"
6.	"Lonely Guy"
7.	"Creepin' Invention"
8.	"Hustle 'n Bustle"
9.	"Blues Wrapped Around My Head"
10.	"Hot Rod Baby"
11.	"New York Studio 1959"
12.	"Sharks Flying In"
13.	"Boogie Boogie"
14.	"Love Is All Around"
15.	"Ludwiggin'"
16.	"Rockin' Mode"
17.	"California Luau"
18.	"Little M"
