= John Howie Jr. =

Background information
- Born: Chapel Hill, North Carolina
- Genres: Alternate country, honky-tonk
- Occupations: Singer, songwriter, musician
- Instruments: Vocals, guitar, drums
- Years active: 1990s-present

John Howie Jr. is an American singer, songwriter, and drummer from North Carolina. He is best known as the founder and frontman of the country bands Two Dollar Pistols (1996–2008), and John Howie Jr. and the Rosewood Bluff. Howie has also performed in the groups Finger, June, Sarah Shook & the Disarmers, Snatches of Pink, and The Sweethearts.

== Career ==
Howie formed the Two Dollar Pistols in 1996 following stints playing drums in the Triangle area rock bands June, and Snatches of Pink. The honky-tonk outfit emerged during the 1990s rise in popularity of alternative country, and released their first album, On Down the Track, on Scrimshaw Records in 1997. Their debut was followed by Step Right Up, which was recorded live at Local 506 in Chapel Hill, North Carolina in 1998 - their first release on Yep Roc Records.

In 1999, the Two Dollar Pistols released the EP, The Two Dollar Pistols with Tift Merritt on Yep Roc. Tift Merritt was then fronting the Raleigh band the Carbines. The seven song EP mixed country standards with original material. Howie and Merritt co-wrote "If Only You Were Mine," and "Counting the Hours," which were both subsequently used in the 2001 thriller Jeepers Creepers.

Following that, the Pistols released You Ruined Everything (2002), Hands Up! (2004) on Yep Roc, and Here Tomorrow, Gone Today (2007), which was released on 8th House Records, a label cofounded with Michael Rank. The latter was their last release before going on hiatus, although they have performed reunion shows in 2017, and 2018.

Howie went on to form John Howie Jr. and the Rosewood Bluff. Their first album, Leavin' Yesterday, produced by Brian Paulson, was released in 2011, followed by Everything Except Goodbye in 2014. Howie later joined Sarah Shook & the Disarmers as drummer, playing on their debut album, Sidelong, and co-writing the song "Fuck Up" with Shook.

Originally self released in 2015, Sidelong was reissued by the Bloodshot Records in 2017. Howie toured and recorded with the Disarmers through 2017, and also played on their second album Years, released by Bloodshot in 2018. After leaving the band, Howie released his first solo album, Not Tonight, on Suah Sounds in 2018. In 2025, he returned with the Rosewood Bluff for The Return Of..., released by Schoolkids Records. The album was their first full-length since Everything Except Goodbye in 2014. The record was produced by Howie and guitarist Tim Shearer and featured Dave Hartman of Southern Culture on the Skids on drums.

== Discography ==
With Two Dollars Pistols

- On Down the Track (1997)
- Step Right Up (1998)
- The Two Dollar Pistols with Tift Merritt (1999) - EP
- You Ruined Everything (2002)
- Hands Up! (2004)
- Here Tomorrow, Gone Today (2007)

With John Howie Jr. and the Rosewood Bluff

- Leavin' Yesterday (2011)
- Everything Except Goodbye (2014)
- The Return Of... (2025)

Solo

- Not Tonight (2018)

With Sarah Shook & the Disarmers

- Sidelong (2015, reissued 2017)
- Years (2018)
