= Righteous (disambiguation) =

To be righteous is to act in an upright, moral, virtuous manner.

Righteous may also refer to:

- Righteous (album), an album by DAG
  - "Righteous (City Pain)", a song from that album
- "Righteous" (song), a song by Juice Wrld from the album Legends Never Die
- "Righteous", a song by Joe Satriani from the album What Happens Next

== See also ==
- The Righteous (disambiguation)
- Righteousness
