= Apartment 635 =

Apartment #635

Studio album by DAG
- Released: 1998
- Recorded: 1998
- Genre: Funk, R&B
- Length: 42:36
- Label: Columbia

DAG chronology
| Righteous (1994) | Apartment #635 (1998) | A Guide to Groovy Lovin' (1998) |

Apartment #635 is the second album by the funk band DAG, released in 1998.

== Critical reception ==
Professional ratings
Review scores
| Source | Rating |
|---|---|
| AllMusic | 4/5 stars |

Keyboard deemed the album "funk, old-school style," writing "think Jamiroquai crossbred with the Time." The Charleston Daily Mail thought that "imitation is not an entirely bad thing and, all in all, the stuff is convincing and great for parties." The Baltimore Sun wrote that DAG "delivers an old- school groove that's too deep to be written off as mere retro soul."

== Track listing ==
1. "Our Love Would Be Much Better (If I Gave a Damn About You)" – 3:40
2. "Girl Had It Good" – 3:42
3. "You Make Me Feel" – 4:28
4. "Apartment #635" – 4:21
5. "Ruin You" – 3:26
6. "Shine" – 4:16
7. "Worldspinning" – 5:52
8. "If It's On" – 4:12
9. "Supercollider" – 3:54
10. "If You Ever Need a Heart" – 4:37
