= East Side Soul =

Studio album by the Blazers
- Released: 1995
- Genre: Rock
- Label: Rounder
- Producer: Cesar Rosas

The Blazers chronology
Short Fuse (1994)	East Side Soul (1995)	Just for You (1997)

East Side Soul is the second album by the American band the Blazers, released in 1995. Although often compared to Los Lobos, the band considered themselves to be more of a standard four-piece rock and roll band. The band supported the album with a North American tour.

== Production ==
Like the band's debut, the album was produced by Cesar Rosas; it was recorded in his studio. It contains covers of Jessie Hill's "Ooh-Poo-Pah-Doo" and Canned Heat's "Going Up the Country". Many of the originals were written at the same time as the songs that made up the debut.

== Critical reception ==
Professional ratings
Review scores
Source	Rating
AllMusic	4/5 stars
Los Angeles Times	3/4 stars
MusicHound Rock: The Essential Album Guide	3/5 stars
Orlando Sentinel	4/5 stars
The San Diego Union-Tribune	3/4 stars

The Morning Call wrote that "the Blazers' sound spotlights the dual guitar attack of [Ruben] Guaderrama and [Manuel] Gonzales and the tight and versatile rhythm section of bassist Lee Stuart and drummer Ruben Gonzalez, who can swing mightily on a danceable rocker such as 'What's Wrong With You' or lock into the traditional cumbia rhythm of 'Cero 39' with equal ease." The Orlando Sentinel thought that the guitarists "sound like Keith Richards and Ron Wood on 'Before I Get Too Old'." The San Diego Union-Tribune deemed the album "foot-stomping music that makes people dance the jitterbug and the sideways pony, as well as cumbia."

Hispanic concluded that "the band still plays some of the most danceable music with a rockin' edge and cumbias that rule." The Los Angeles Times determined that "the quartet doesn't aim for the sociopolitical undercurrents or carefully groomed textures of Los Lobos, but the Blazers' roots rock—which is more in the raw tradition of the Blasters and, at times, Keith Richards—comes across with such assurance and authority that the album is a fine companion, whether you accept its invitation to pull up a bar stool or step onto the dance floor."

AllMusic wrote that "few bands have ever combined gutsy blues-rock and sheer joyous energy the way the Blazers did on East Side Soul, much less created such a successful and interesting fusion of musical cultures." The Houston Press praised "Cumbia del Sol", calling it "criminally underheard."

== Track listing ==
No.	Title	Length
1.	"Fun & Laughter"
2.	"All Day Long"
3.	"Before I Get Too Old"
4.	"Cumbia del Sol"
5.	"Brother"
6.	"Let Me Go"
7.	"Going Up the Country"
8.	"I'll Stay Right Here"
9.	"Dance the Night Away"
10.	"What's Wrong with You"
11.	"Cero 39"
12.	"You Didn't Try"
13.	"Stuck in My Head"
14.	"Ooh-Poo-Pah-Doo"
