= Go Go Harlem Baby =

Studio album by Flat Duo Jets
- Released: 1991
- Studios: Easley-McCain (Memphis, Tennessee)
- Genre: Punkabilly
- Length: 39:47
- Label: Sky
- Producer: Jim Dickinson

Go Go Harlem Baby is an album by the American punkabilly band Flat Duo Jets. It was released via Sky in 1991. The band supported the album with a North American tour.

The album was reissued by Third Man Records in 2011; it was for a time one of Jack White's favorite albums.

== Production ==
Recorded at Easley McCain Recording, the album was produced by Jim Dickinson. The majority of Go Go Harlem Baby was recorded in three days. "You Belong to Me" is a cover of the Duprees' song; "Apple Blossom Time" is a cover of the standard made popular by the Andrews Sisters. "Wild Trip" is a cover of the Ventures instrumental.

== Critical reception ==
Professional ratings
Review scores
Source	Rating
AllMusic	4.5/5 stars
The Encyclopedia of Popular Music	3/5 stars
MusicHound Rock: The Essential Album Guide	3.5/5 stars
Orlando Sentinel	4/5 stars
The Rolling Stone Album Guide	3.5/5 stars
The Tampa Tribune	2.5/4 stars

Trouser Press wrote that "the ultra-live sound of the speedballs renders some of them generic, although [Dexter] Romweber continues to excel on the slower cuts, offering an atmospheric reading of the instrumental classic 'Harlem Nocturne'." Spin called Romweber "the Crispin Glover of rock'n'roll singers," writing that he emotes "with a creepy edge that Jerry Lee Lewis himself would be hard-pressed to match."

The Orlando Sentinel thought that "for a rock 'n' roll animal, Romweber has an amazingly pretty voice." The Washington Post opined that "wild-eyed, gravel-voiced singer/songwriter/guitarist Dexter Romweber remains an original, his genius and his preposterousness inextricably linked." The Tampa Tribune said that Romweber's guitar "can screech with icy feedback or sing in a warm rush of echo."

AllMusic wrote that the band's "deliciously dirty and rough brand of rockabilly is unrivaled, and this disc is perhaps their finest."

== Track listing ==
No.	Title	Length
1.	"Flat Duo Jets Anthem"
2.	"The Dainty Song"
3.	"Go Go Harlem Baby"
4.	"You Belong to Me"
5.	"Frog Went a Courtin'"
6.	"No Greater Love"
7.	"I Don't Know"
8.	"Harlem Nocturne"
9.	"Wild Trip"
10.	"Rock House"
11.	"Stalkin'"
12.	"Don't Blame Me"
13.	"Love Has Its Joke Sometimes"
14.	"TV Mama"
15.	"Apple Blossom Time"
16.	"Ask Me How I Live"

== Personnel ==
- Dexter Romweber – guitar, vocals
- Chris "Crow" Smith – drums
