= The Blazers =

American rock band

- Origin: United States
- Genres: Pop, rock, blues, Latin alternative
- Years active: 1993–present
- Labels: Rounder Records, Little Dog Records, CRS Records Ltd
- Members: Ruben Guaderrama, Raul Medrano
- Past members: Ruben Gonzalez, Lee Stuart, Jesus Cuevas, Mike Molina, Manuel Gonzales

The Blazers is a rock and roll, blues and Latin alternative band, based out of East Los Angeles.

Original band members were Manuel Gonzales, Ruben Guaderrama, Ruben Gonzalez and Lee Stuart. The current members are Ruben Guaderrama, and Raul Medrano. Ruben Gonzalez, Lee Stuart, Jesus Cuevas, Mike Molina and Manuel Gonzales all were formerly members of the band, but left to pursue their own music. Cuevas left the band to play more accordion. He would later join Cali-Mex band Los Fabulocos.

They are signed to Rounder Records, but they have released albums through CRS Records Ltd and Little Dog Records.

== Origins and history ==
Both Manuel Gonzales and Ruben Guaderrama were the original founding members of the Blazers and were the core of the group. The two were lifelong friends from their early school days in (Theodore Roosevelt High School) in the City of Boyle Heights in East Los Angeles. Both Manuel and Ruben grew up on the rough streets of East Los Angeles and their mutual love of music gave them strength.They thus inspired young musicians who grew up in the same difficult conditions. The Blazers influenced many local bands like La Terra and helped create that unique soulful sound of Mexican American Rock n Roll also known as East Side Soul or Chicano Rock, as pioneered by famous groups like Los Lobos. Cesar of Los Lobos saw this talent and potential that The Blazers had and not only inspired them but produced their first two records: Short Fuse and East Side Soul.

== Members ==
=== Current members ===
- Ruben Guaderrama - vocals, guitar
- Raul Medrano - drums

=== Former members ===
- Lee Stuart - bass
- Ruben Gonzalez - guitar
- Jesus Cuevas - accordion, vocals
- Mike Molina - drums
- Manuel Gonzales - vocals, guitar

== Discography ==
- Short Fuse (1994)
- East Side Soul (1995)
- Going Up The Country (1996)
- Just For You (1997)
- Puro Blazers (2000)
- The Seventeen Jewels (2003)
- Dreaming a Dream (2008)
