= Los Fabulocos =

American Tex-Mex band

- Origin: U.S.
- Genres: Tex-Mex
- Members: 2003; James Barrios; Jesus Cuevas; Mike Molina; Kid Ramos; 2011; James Barrios; Jesus Cuevas; Mike Molina; Al Martinez

Los Fabulocos is an American, Cali-Mex band that is led by Jesus Cuevas, a vocalist and accordion player who used to be with the Blazers, an East Los Angeles–based group. It also features Kid Ramos, who has in the past worked with the Fabulous Thunderbirds. Like, Malo, Los Lobos, El Chicano, the Blazers, and Tierra.

== Background ==
They hail from East Los Angeles which has Americas largest Mexican-American community. Their music could be described as a mixture of traditional Spanish and Mexican music, Blues, R&B, and Rockabilly.

Among some of the songs they have recorded are "Crazy Baby" by Gene Maltais.

When Kid Ramos left the band in 2011 Al Martinez joined.

== Band members ==
- James Barrios, Bass and Vocals
- Jesus Cuevas, Accordion and Vocals
- Kid Ramos, Bajo Sexto, Guitar and Vocals (Left 2011)
- Mike Molina, Drums
- Al Martinez (Joined 2011)

== Discography of releases ==
- Los Fabulocos, 2008
- Dos, 2010
