= The Righteous =

The Righteous may refer to:

- The Righteous (1994 film) (Polish: Tzedek, French: Les Justes), a French and Swiss documentary film directed by Marek Halter
- The Righteous (2015 film) (Polish: Sprawiedliwy), a Polish drama film directed by Michal Szczerbic
- The Righteous (2021 film), a Canadian psychological thriller film directed by Mark O'Brien
- The Righteous (2023 film), aka Pravednik, a Russian military-historical drama directed by Sergei Ursulyak
- The Righteous (2026 film), an upcoming thriller film
- The Righteous (professional wrestling), a professional wrestling group

== See also ==
- Righteousness
- Righteous (disambiguation)
