= The Furious Sessions =

The Furious Sessions is a musical project developed for the Spanish newspaper El País by the Sol de Sants Studios in Barcelona and the RiD vídeo crew.

A big part of the major Spanish indie bands have recorded a "Furious Session", which consist in a live video take of one song in the studio. With the years the project has grown into a bigger show, with international bands such as Vintage Trouble, Femi Kuti, Dungen, Lloyd Cole, Avishai Cohen, The Wild Feathers, Glasvegas, Rodrigo Amarante or Morcheeba.

It started in 2011 when Alberto Sol de Sants, Javier Domínguez and Bernat Rueda decided to record their first band together. Since then Sol de Sants Studios is hosting one session per month in which the musicians feel free to experiment. Very often the results are so positive that the bands include these recording into their LP's.

In January 2013, the Spanish newspaper El País joined the project.

El País is realising one Furious Sessions per month.
