= Snatches of Pink =

American rock band

- Also known as: Clarissa, Almost Human, Ragamuffin
- Origin: Chapel Hill, North Carolina U.S.
- Genres: Rock; punk rock; country rock; alternative rock; post punk; indie rock; hard rock
- Years active: 1985-2007
- Labels: Mammoth Records; Hollywood Records; Dog Gone Records; Sky Records; MoRisen Records; 8th House
- Spinoffs: Michael Rank; Michael Rank and Stag
- Members: Michael Rank; Nikos Chremos; John Howie Jr. Marc E. Smith
- Past members: Andy McMillan; Sara Romweber; Jack Wenberg; Kevin Clark; Emory Ball; Eric Peterson; David Thrower; Ray Dafrico
- Website: snatchesofpink.com

Snatches of Pink was a rock band based in Chapel Hill, North Carolina. They also recorded under the name Clarissa. MTV called them "a raunchy rock 'n' roll band and the real thing. Cool as hell. Loud as hell," as well as "the most exciting unknown band in America."

== Early history ==
Snatches of Pink was formed in Chapel Hill, North Carolina in 1985 by Andy McMillan and Michael Rank. The two met at a record store where McMillan worked. At the time, McMillan was 23 years old and Rank was 19 years old. McMillan studied architecture at North Carolina State University before transferring to the University of North Carolina at Chapel Hill where he majored in math.

For the band's first four shows, McMillan played stand-up drums and sang, with Rank on guitars. After a couple of months, the duo was joined by Sara Romweber (Kamikazes, Let's Active) on drums, and McMillan moved to the bass guitar which was a new instrument for him. Initially, the band performed covers but eventually started writing their own material. Rank was the primary the songwriter.

When Romweber joined the band, she wanted to change its name. On one occasion, McMillan said the band's name was his description of an album cover. Another time, McMillan said that the name Snatches of Pink was selected because "Pink is a great color." He noted that the name was "not a frock, not a communist collaborative,...not an overt euphemism for the vagina." Nevertheless, in September and October 1986, the band experimented with different in names. They used the name Ragamuffin when they played at Cat's Cradle with Satellite Boyfriend on September 27 and with Flat Duo Jets October 4. Later in October, they were using the name Almost Human. For a show with the Bad Checks at the Cat's Cradle on October 31, 1986, they were advertised as "Snatches of Pink (the unnamed band's former name)." However by November, they were back to using Snatches of Pink. Romweber said, "We tried changing the name, and we had many different names and none of them worked. So Michael and Andrew, too, said, 'Let's go back to this name.' And all I said was, 'I don't have to say the name out loud,' and so I rarely do."

Snatches of Pink was different from the other North Carolina acts of the era because of their "rough and ragged approach." The band was fans of The Rolling Stones, Jason and the Scorchers, and The Replacements. Rank recalls, "Snatches of Pink...worshiped dutifully at the altar of Johnny Thunders and Keef. We claimed the Replacements and Jason & The Scorchers as our Pied Pipers and we climbed into the rental van!' One reviewer wrote, "If Keith Richards had grown up listening to The Velvet Underground's 'Sister Ray' instead of Muddy Waters, the Stones might have sounded like this. And don't balk at the comparison because this Chapel Hill band is that good." Another reviewer said, "Imagine Husker Du's waves of noise coupled with early Replacements' bratty disdain for 'convention.' Now imagine rock 'n' roll would-be martyrs Johnny Thunders or Keith Richards fronting this motley crew. Got it? Now turn it up to 11. Good. Now you have Snatches of Pink..."

Jack Wenberg joined the lineup on bass. The band then recorded a demo cassette with the production assistance of John Plymale (Pressure Boys). Rank said, "Mainly it was something for us to do so we could hear what out stuff sounded like." These demos ended up at WXYC, the student radio station of the University of North Carolina at Chapel Hill, and gained some airtime.

Around 1986, Freddie Jenkins became the band's de facto road manager, staying with them through 1998. The band recorded a second demo cassette in the summer of 1987 which was sold through School Kids Records. Although the sound did not meet the band's expectations, it did help them land a recording contract with Dog Gone Records, the Athens, Georgia indie label of former R.E.M. manager Jefferson Holt, in the summer of 1987. The band knew Holt from Chapel Hill before he relocated to Athens, Georgia and discovered R.E.M.

=== Send in the Clowns ===
Snatches of Pink released its first album, Send in the Clowns in 1987 on Dog Gone Records. For the album, Wenberg was replaced by Eric Peterson (dB's) on bass. Peterson also produced the album—he knew Rank from high school and did this as a personal favor. Once the album was released, Romweber recalled, "We had a conflict. There were people that liked our live shows [who] didn't quite know what to make of our recordings 'cause they became more tame and kind of produced sounding." In the reverse, the people who liked the recordings were not expecting the loudness of the live shows. In short, the band was not happy with the sound of the album.

The New York Daily News gave Send in the Clowns two stars, saying, "Trio doing raucous country rock that's just plain a lot of fun, lyrically and musically. You can also sing along." In contrast, another reviewer wrote, "It's a promising debut, but it definitely would have benefited from clearer lyrics. ...I don't think every rock song should have perfectly clear, cleanly articulated lyrics. But I do think you should be able to hear enough of a song to tell what it's about. ...The music is good—very good—and you can't help but thinking that the band has something to say. Maybe on their next album, we'll hear what it is." Another reviewer wrote, "Between the records extremely 'live' (e.g. chaotic) sound fell muddy production, and vocals that more resemble the nocturnal brayings of wounded animals than actual human sounds. It took a whole side before we realized this LP was not a lampoon parody of country-rock, but an honest attempt at the style. The attempt is defeated by three things: the band can't play, the band can't sing, and the producers don't seem to have a clue."

To support the album, the band went on an extensive tour. However, the New York agency, F.B.I., who scheduled most of their gigs booked "inappropriate clubs" and failed to understand the goals of the band. For example, when the band participated in the New Music Seminar in New York City in July 1988, their showcase was scheduled at the Bitter End, a club known for folk music. Send in the Clowns did not get the radio airplay or the sales that the label and band had hoped for.

=== Dead Men ===
By February 1988, guitarist David Thrower (Hege V) had joined the band. By the time Snatches of Pink record its second album, Dead Men, in late 1989, Wenberg and Thrower were gone and they were back to being a trio. However, guitarist Ray Dafrico played on some tracks—and would continue to play in the band's live shows of the era. With this record, Rank shared lead vocals with McMillan who had returned to playing the bass guitar. The album was produced by Robin Guthrie, guitarist of the Cocteau Twins. However, internal issues at Dog Gone caused delays. The first pressing of the album was badly mastered, making it necessary to re-manufacture the records. Then, when the album was sent to the record stores, it was discovered that the cassettes were recorded at too low a volume—and the artwork has printing problems. McMillian called it the "Dog Gone Jinx."

The album's title, Dead Men, came from the pirate saying "dead men don't bite." The band held a joint album release party at the Cat's Cradle with Flat Duo Jets, who also had signed with Dog Gone Records, on September 9, 1989. One reviewer wrote, "Dead Men tells no tales—at least, I didn't hear any, because most of the vocals are buried beneath heaping mounds of fuzzy guitar and stomping punk-ish rhythms." In contrast, another reviewer wrote, "One of the highlights of Dead Men is Rank's vocals. Not that you can understand any of the words. But the sound of Rank's voice is what distinguishes the songs. It's world-weary and throaty like a punk rock Jim Morrison. Sometimes it's a drunken caterwaul, with a metal explosion behind it for accent. But there's harmony in the din." The album made it into the top forty of College Radio's Top 100 and was reviewed in Billboard and Spin. The band also made a video for the song "Sleeping Dogs."

=== Television and live shows ===
On May 7, 1989, Snatches of Pink were the opening act for Sylvia Juncosa and Soundgarden at Cat's Cradle in Chapel Hill. At this time, the band consisted of Romweber, Rank, McMillan, and Dafrico—with the latter three sharing vocals. A reviewer of the three-band show noted that Snatches of Pink "stole the limelight" and that "Soundgarden was good, as was Sylvia Juncosa. Perhaps they both would have sounded better had Snatches not upstaged them."

In December 1989, MTV filmed a piece on Snatches of Pink that ran on News at Night with Kurt Loder in January 1990. As a result of the MTV segment, record sales and calls for bookings were up.

Freddie Salem (The Chamber Brothers, Outlaws) recorded the band's Deader Than You'll Ever Be, live at CBGB on April 25, 1990. This four-song EP was only released on vinyl as a limited-edition radio promotion, and also included a live performance of "Dogs" that was recorded by MTV's Tim Sommer. This EP "solidified their image as a hard-drinkin', unrepentantly badass group who clearly did not give a shit what folks—and, significantly, club owners and bookers—thought about the band as long as they came out to the show." In fact, Snatches of Pink lived up to that reputation: Jeff Lowrey, owner of the 13-13 Club in Charlotte, North Carolina complained about "how unprofessional and arrogant" they were as they "knocked over mic stands and monitors, left broken bottles on the stage and ignored the soundman's pleas to turn down the volume and distortion."

One reviewer noted that the group had earned "a reputation as the bad boys of the Chapel Hill scene, the band with the worst attitude." Another was clearly a fan of their live show, writing, "Like ex-New York Dolls' guitarist Jimmy Thunders with his amp cranked full blast, Michael Rank rips and whirls leads out of his guitar with a sneering attitude. The whole sound achieves a mystical, masterful quality of looseness—like everything is teetering on the brink of collapse. And—just like every great live performer from Little Richard to the Sex Pistols to Sonic Youth—Snatches of Pink's shows retain rock's basic defiant, anarchic—and accessible—spirit."

Over the years, Snatches of Pink opened for several acts working in a similar vein, including Johnny Thunders, The Ramones, The Cramps, Iggy Pop, Soul Asylum, John Kay and Steppenwolf, and Rocket from the Crypt. As one review of the era noted, "They lived the part and looked it, too, each member's shaggy, unkempt hair shrouding his or her face to the point that you figured it was only a matter of time before someone tumbled off the edge of the stage."

=== Bent with Pray ===
In early 1991, Snatches of Pink had offers from Walt Disney's new record label, Hollywood Records, and the semi-major label Caroline Records. Rank really wanted to work with Keith Wood at Caroline Records, and negotiated a deal with Hollywood Records in that allowed him to make a solo record with Caroline. For the first time, the band had a "decent" recording budget. They used this budget to experiment, finding "a softer, psychedelic, more overtly melodic side" with hints of roots rock. The album was produced and mixed for Hollywood by Freddie Salem (The Chamber Brothers, Outlaws).

However, after the band recorded their big-label album, Hollywood was struggling financially, and Tim Sommer, the A&R person who signed Snatches of Pink, left the label to host a show for VH1. This left the band "in record label limbo," uncertain if Hollywood would release their album. However, Sommer said, "I don't think they'll take the fact that I left out on the bands I signed. I think they'll let Snatches of Pink do what's best for the band, whether that's staying with Hollywood or going somewhere else. Snatches should be where they're loved and appreciated for the music they do."

Snatches of Pink's Bent With Pray was released by Caroline Records on April 21, 1992. Trouser Press summarized this album as, "Clearly recorded 12- and 6-string acoustic guitars, glazed with solid drumming and nearly nonexistent bass. Highly recommended." Spin wrote, "Be aware from the opening note of the Snatches of Pink release, on through to the closing, an overwhelming wash of feeling, sometimes leading to tears, will be very much a reality. Not because of anything vocalist–songwriter–guitarist Michael Rank is singing, but because of the sheer weighty beauty coming out of this threesome..." Later, Spin placed Bent With Pray as number six on the "10 Best Albums You Didn't Hear in 1992." The band also created a related video for "Powder Blue."

=== Clarissa ===
The band changed its name to Clarissa in 1993. McMillan says, "I remember telling people—and there was some truth to this actually—that we just decided to give ourselves a name that their mothers could tell people. That was an easy answer, but again, it did have some truth to it." Rank recalls that was some legality to switching labels, "It made that simpler for...Snatches of Pink to end... And the name Snatches of Pink never really seemed to be helping us in any way whatsoever. And it just seemed like this f**king curse."

On May 19, 1993, Clarissa returned to Chapel Hill for the first time in three years to play the closing show at the Cat's Cradle, as the opening act to The Jayhawks and Victoria Williams. McMillan correctly said, "Just wait a while and Frank [Heath] will be back with a new Cradle." After a three-year recording hiatus, the band signed a two or five-record deal with Mammoth Records in June 1994.

In 1996, Clarissa released the album Silver. The label's goal was to create a pop record that could get radio play—something the band had lacked up until this point. It was produced by Don Gehman, known for his work with Hootie & the Blowfish, John Mellencamp, and R.E.M. Silver was "less raucous," according to Romweber. McMillian called its style, "not drinking as much music." Rank says his writing at this point was really influenced by the Led Zeppelin song, "Tangerine" and its use of acoustic guitar. Rank had also taken over on lead vocals. One reviewer noted, "There's a strong mix of retro-rock sensations on Silver, from the 12-string period Zeppelin..."

Clarissa toured the United States with The Tragically Hip in the summer of 1996, playing more than forty shows. However, Silver did not find a new audience and failed to bring back the old fans. Rank noted many people felt betrayed by the new sound. Another challenge was that Mammoth Records did not use its distribution deal with Atlantic Records to market Clarissa. Yet, a reviewer of the June 25, 1996 show at Mississippi Nights in St. Louis noted that Clarissa demonstrated that "Punk bands mature into far better versions of John Mellencamp than the ol' Coug himself." Continuing, the reviewer wrote, "The trio maintained heartland rock's sense of community with the ups, downs, and in-betweens of common people. But the air's thin up where Clarissa resides, a landscape where rugged Byrds-style harmonies are doused with thunderclap instrumentals that push songs to the edge of dissonance. No wonder flatland rockers like Mellencamp never attempt the ascent. You just don't make much money up there."

Clarissa released Blood & Commons with Mammoth in 1997, but the label declined to extend the band's contract.

== Reorganization ==
Knowing that this was their last album with Mammoth and realizing that they weren't going to make it big, the band decided to change its name back to Snatches of Pink and played some of their older material, according to Romweber. One of their first shows with their old name was at Sleazefest on August 9, 1998. However, McMillan says, "We did sort of make this decision as a band to stop doing it after this last Mammoth record. When that...band decision was reversed, I was never quite comfortable with that." McMillan left the band in October 1998, saying "When I quit the band, ...I was burnt out on everything." His leaving the band, cause them to cancel their performance in Anchorfest on October 17, 1998.

With McMillan out, Rank and Romweber made demos with their producer John Plymate filling in on bass. Marc E. Smith (Patty Hurst Shifter) joined the band on guitars and vocals in 1999, creating a lineup with two guitars and no bass. Romweber left in 2000 saying, "I was quite burned out on it on it too, honestly. At this point, Rank and Romweber were no longer a couple which may have been a factor. Kevin Clark joined on bass in 2001.

In 2003, the band regrouped with Rank playing guitar and lead vocals, Smith on guitar, and Clark on bass. Romweber rejoined to play drums with the band in the studio, resulting in the album Hyena on MoRisen Records in 2003. A reviewer wrote, "After too many years making albums that reflected a maturing sensibility and a name change, Snatches of Pink has brought it all back home with Hyena."

Romweber was replaced by John Howie Jr. (Two Dollar Pistols, Finger) on drums in 2004, except when she substituted for him. Nikos Chremos joined the band on bass in 2005, replacing Clark.

In 2006, the band left MoRisen Records. In 2007, Rank and Howie formed 8th House Records which became the band's new label. Rank notes they were somewhat out of their depth when it came to running a record company. Regardless, the band released their last album Love is Dead through 8th house in April 2007. The lineup at that time was Rank (lead vocals, guitar) with Smith (guitars, vocals), Chremos (bass), and Howie (drums). One reviewer noted the album channeled 1970s The Rolling Stones, with a touch of post-punk Melrose Avenue.

In 2007, the documentary Now It's a Rock & Roll Show!!! A Film About Snatches of Pink was released by Trickle Down Productions and directed by Daniel Andrews. The film's DVD edition featured a bonus disc with footage of the band's live performances, music videos, and interview outtakes. However, that same year, the band slowly came to an end.

== Post break up ==
After leaving the band, Wenberg formed the pop music band The Larks for which he was the singer and songwriter. He said he "felt the need burning in me to express my own creative twist" while in Snatches of Pink. Wenburg now plays with Titanium Rex in which he sings lead vocals, play guitar, and writes songs.

McMillan left performing music, but still mixed sound and managed tours. He was also involved in the new music venue Go! Rehearsal Studio in Carrboro North Carolina, did carpentry work, and owed McLizard & Snake Cafe in Chapel Hill.

Rank continued recording and performing as Michael Rank and Stag, and also with the band Marat. He still uses Fred Jenkins to approve his new releases. However, in 2017, Rank said, "Andy has chosen not to talk anymore. At least not to me. And that has really broken my heart. Every memory always begins with him and me. But there are only so many times you can leave a voicemail for someone telling them you love them and that you miss them and then never get a single reply. "

Romweber stayed in frequent contact with Rank and joined her brother in Flat Duo Jets and the Dex Romweber Duo; the latter collaborated with Jack White. She was also a toy maker. She died from a brain tumor in March 2019 at the age of 55 years. The Town of Carrboro declared June 23, 2019 as Sara Romweber Day in her memory.

Howie formed the John Howie Jr. & the Rosewood Bluff band. He also joined The Larks. Smith played with Michael Rank and Stag.

In September 2001, Snatches of Pink played a 15th-anniversary show for the Cat's Cradle—McMillian joined the band for a mini-reunion, playing "blazing electric tambourine." On November 21, 2021, Snatches of Pink joined other bands for "Be Loud! Calling," a benefit show for the Be Loud! Sophie Foundation at the Cat's Cradle that also celebrated The Clash's London Calling album.

== Activism and charity ==
On March 23, 1986, Snatches of Pink performed in a benefit for the North Carolina Radioactive Waste Watch, a nonprofit opposed to potential radioactive waste sites in North Carolina. Other groups in the show were The Accelerators, The Connells, Flat Duo Jets, Let's Active, and The Woods.

On November 8, 1986, the band played in a benefit for WXYC, the student radio station of the University of North Carolina at Chapel Hill. In addition to the benefit concert, Snatches of Pink contributed two tracks to a cassette called Cradle Tapes that was sold at School Kids Records, also to benefit WXYC. However, the band was disappointed in the lack of organization of the project and the four-month delay in the tape's release. Concerned that the delay had a negative impact on the tape's sales, McMillan said, "I don't think it helped the station and I don't think it helped the bands."

On April 12, 1987, Snatches of Pink joined in a benefit concert for the Carolina Committee on Central America with Other Bright Colors, Rogue, Dexter Romweber, and Southern Culture on the Skids. The benefit raised funds for an independent development project in San Marcos, Nicaragua.

On June 20, 1987, the band played a show to raise money to refurbish the lighting and PA systems at the Cat's Cradle. Snatches of Pink also played in a fundraiser for Art Werner, candidate for Chapel Hill Town Council, on October 19, 1989. Werner had helped Cat's Cradle a new location in 1988.

On September 22, 2001, the band played in a benefit show for Independent Animal Rescue at the Cat's Cradle in Chapel Hill. However, they participated via video because they were on tour at the time.

== Discography ==
=== Slashes of Pink ===
==== EPs ====
- Stupid Tape (cassette, 1985)
- Demonstration/Demolition (cassette, 1987)
- Deader Than You'll Ever Be (Live at CBGB, 1990)

==== Albums ====
- Send in the Clowns (Dog Gone Records, 1987)
- Dead Men (Sky Record, 1989)
- Bent with Pray (Hollywood Records/Caroline Distribution, 1992)
- Hyena (MoRisen Records, 2003)
- Stag (MoRisen Records, 2005)
- Love Is Dead (8th House, 2007)

==== Compilations ====
- "Kissing the Thin Air" and "Ones with the Black" – Cradle Tapes (1987)
- Demo Listen (WXYZ, 1990)
- "Judus" – Waiting... Original Motion Picture Soundtrack (Lionsgate, 2005)
- "Dance with Me." – STIV BATORS Tribute Album

=== Clarissa ===
- Silver (Mammoth, 1996)
- Blood & Commons (Mammoth, 1997)

== Filmography ==
- Now It's a Rock & Roll Show!!! A film about Snatches of Pink (Trickle Down Productions, 2007)

=== Television soundtracks as Snatches as Pink ===
- "Dance" – "The Party," Wildfire (ABC Family, August 15, 2005)
- "Judus" – Wildfire (ABC Family, 2006)

=== Movie soundtracks as Snatches of Pink ===
- "Otto Wood' – At Middleton (2013)
- "Dance" – Waiting... (2005)

=== Movie soundtracks as Clarissa ===
- "Apology" – Brink! (1998)
