= DAG (band) =

American funk band

- Origin: Raleigh, North Carolina, U.S.
- Genres: Funk
- Years active: 1989–1999
- Labels: Columbia, Sony
- Past members: Bobby Patterson; Brian Dennis; Kenny Soule; Doug Jervey; Kai Russell; Jen Gunderman

DAG was an American funk band from Raleigh, North Carolina that formed in 1989 and disbanded in 1999.

The band of singer and bassist Bobby Patterson, guitarist Brian Dennis, drummer Kenny Soule (from rock bands Nantucket and PKM) and keyboardist Doug Jervey had already earned many loyal listeners around their hometown over the next few years with their uncommonly 1970s wild funk persona; and with the help of Grammy Award nominee and local record producer John Custer (who also developed Cry Of Love and produced several Corrosion of Conformity albums), DAG gained the attention of some major record labels.

DAG signed with Columbia Records, and released their debut album Righteous in 1994. Their recordings even attracted special guest performances from Muscle Shoals Rhythm Section drummer Roger Hawkins, also known for drum work with Aretha Franklin, Wilson Pickett, Steve Winwood and others. The album was well praised nationally with high reviews.

Their 1998 follow-up, Apartment #635 received some critical acclaim. A six-song compilation album, called A Guide to Groovy Lovin', was also released that year. The band split soon after due to changes in musical preferences.

DAG songs were featured in three motion pictures, Boomerang, Bad Boys, and Ready to Wear (Prêt-à-Porter). Additionally, a live in-studio version of 'Lovely Jane' was included on the CD "The Best of the Columbia Records Radio Hour, Vol. 2" along with tracks by such artists as The Dave Matthews Band and James Taylor.

== Discography ==
=== Albums ===
- Righteous (1994)
- Apartment #635 (1998)
- A Guide to Groovy Lovin' (1998)

=== Singles ===
- "Our Love Would Be Much Better (If I Gave a Damn About You)" (1998)
