= A Guide to Groovy Lovin' =

Studio album by DAG
- Released: 1998
- Genre: Rhythm and blues
- Length: 25:14
- Label: Columbia

Professional ratings
Review scores
Source	Rating
AllMusic	4/5 stars

A Guide to Groovy Lovin' is an album by DAG.

== Track listing ==
1. "Sweet Little Lass" – 4:42
2. "Our Love Would Be Much Better (If I Gave A Damn About You)" – 3:42
3. "Righteous" – 3:38
4. "You Make Me Feel" – 4:30
5. "Lovely Jane" – 4:48
6. "Supercollider" – 3:54
