= Gene Maltais =

American hard rock 'n' roll musician (1933–2024)

- Also known as: "Mad Man" Maltais
- Born: Eugene Real Maltais; May 21, 1933; Concord, New Hampshire, U.S.
- Died: February 1, 2024 (aged 90) Concord, New Hampshire
- Genres: Rockabilly, rock and roll
- Occupations: Singer, songwriter
- Instruments: Vocals, guitar
- Years active: 1956–1994
- Labels: Decca Records (1957), Aladdin (1958), Lilac Records, Regal, Norton (1994)

Gene Maltais (May 21, 1933 – February 1, 2024), known by the stage name "Mad Man" Maltais, was an American rockabilly musician and singer-songwriter from Concord, New Hampshire. A regional presence on the New England rock and roll scene of the late 1950s, he recorded for Decca Records in Nashville and released a series of singles that became sought-after among collectors of the genre.

== Life and career ==
=== Early life and Decca recording ===
Eugene Real Maltais was born in Concord, New Hampshire on May 21, 1933. He took up guitar as a teenager and, during his final two years of high school, performed regularly at local venues including a recurring engagement at a local restaurant. After completing his education he traveled around the country, working various jobs before returning to New Hampshire to focus on music. a session was arranged at the Owen Bradley Film & Recording Studio, Nashville, on April 19, 1957, following a Brenda Lee recording date that day. The session featured Owen Bradley on piano, Hank Garland on lead guitar, and the Anita Kerr Singers as backing vocalists.

=== Lilac Records ===
He founded Lilac Records in 1959, through which he independently released material. In 1965, Maltais recorded a demo tape for a song with Regal Records, in Phoenix, Arizona, but nothing became of it and he spent the next decade in New Hampshire, with subsequent music being self-released on Lilac, such as "The Raging Sea" b/w "Gang War" in 1959, recorded with his new ensemble, The Gibson String Band. Fewer than 1,000 copies were pressed, making the record a collectible, and it was reissued by Norton in 2012 on CD. Maltais performed only regionally in New England for the next decade. He recorded with Belgian producer Mac Bouvrie, for the record label Monopole, in 1977.

=== Lack of success and return to New Hampshire ===
Maltais returned to New England, where he performed on the local circuit and was billed as "The King of Rock 'n' Roll in New England," and according to the Rockabilly Hall of Fame hosted a local television broadcast called The Gene Maltais Variety Hour. Afterwards, he headed to Hollywood, California where he met Tony Hilder, who introduced him to Aladdin Records where the duo John & Jackie recorded his compositions, "The Raging Sea" and "Little Girl," released by Aladdin in 1958, with the latter causing controversy on release. Unhappy with how Aladdin handled his songs, Maltais chose not to sign with the label.

He went to Phoenix, where he landed an audition with the local Regal Records by showing them his Decca single. The session produced "Lovemakin'" b/w "The Bug" though the record had originally been intended for a label called REV Records before ending up on Regal. Who played lead guitar at that session has never been settled: Maltais remembered it as Duane Eddy, but session records credit Al Casey. When the single came out, Billboard called "Lovemakin'" a "blues, chanted with a swinging quality" and "The Bug" a "driving blues" with "funky guitars."

=== Later life ===
Maltais intermittently performed at events in New England. In 1994 he returned to the studio, recording "Voodoo Woman" b/w "Little Girl" for Norton Records in New York. He died in Concord on February 1, 2024, at the age of 90.

== Legacy ==
Maltais's 1959 Lilac single became a collectors' item and was reissued by Norton Records in 2012. He was also mention as an influence on The Cramps by NTS Radio. Among artists who later covered his compositions was the Tex-Mex band Los Fabulocos, who recorded "Crazy Baby". His career is chronicled in The Sounds of Our Town: A History of Boston Rock and Roll.
