= Righteous (album) =

Studio album by DAG
- Released: 1994
- Recorded: 1993–94
- Genre: Funk
- Length: 48:24
- Label: Columbia
- Producer: John Custer

DAG chronology
Righteous (1994)	Apartment #635 (1998)

Righteous is the 1994 debut release by the North Carolina funk band DAG. It was produced by John Custer. Muscle Shoals Rhythm Section drummer Roger Hawkins played on the album.

== Critical reception ==
Professional ratings
Review scores
Source	Rating
AllMusic	4.5/5 stars

The St. Petersburg Times noted that "these trance-inducing grooves make you forget not only the legions of alternative/punk/funk pretenders, but respected groovers like the Brand New Heavies."

== Track listing ==
1. Intro – 0:25
2. Sweet Little Lass (Custer) – 4:40
3. Righteous (City Pain) (Custer/Soule) – 3:37
4. Your Mama's Eyes (Patterson/Custer) – 4:03
5. Home (Custer/Dennis) – 3:23
6. Lovely Jane (Custer) – 4:47
7. You Can Lick It (If You Try) (Custer) – 5:33
8. Even So (Custer/Dennis) – 4:16
9. Plow (Custer/Dennis) – 4:13
10. Candy (Custer/Dennis/Patterson) – 3:38
11. Sat. Morning (Custer/Dennis) – 1:05
12. As (Custer/Dennis) – 3:56
13. Do Me Good (Custer) – 4:17
14. Outro (Unnamed Hidden Track) – 0:31

== Personnel ==
- Bobby Patterson: Vocals, Bass, Wah-Wah Guitar
- Brian Dennis: Guitar, Wah-Wah Guitar, Talkbox, Coral Sitar
- Kenny Soule: Drums, Log Drum, Timbales, Tambourine, Cowbell, Glockenspiel
- Doug Jervey: Keyboards, Crumar Orchestrator, Rolands, Vibes, Mini-Moog, Univox Maxi-Korg, Hammond B-3 Organ, Pianos, Background Vocals

Additional musicians

- Jeremy Davenport: Trumpet
- Will Campbell: Alto Saxophone
- Mark Mullins: Trombone
- Lisimba Moyenda: Percussion on "Even So"
- John Custer: Love Unlimited Guitar, T-Wah Guitar
- Clayton Ivey: Hammond B-3 Organ on "Candy"
- Roger Hawkins: Drums, Tambourine, Congas
- Audley Freed: Fadeout Guitar Solo on "Candy"
- Valerie Kashimura: Background Vocals on "As"
- Jewel Bass: Background Vocals on "As"
- Jason Patterson: Drums on "Do Me Good"
- Sean Hepler: The Prospector on "Do Me Good"
