= Dexter Romweber =

American musician (1966–2024)

- Romweber in 2016

Background information
- Also known as: Dex Romweber
- Born: John Michael Romweber II; June 18, 1966; Batesville, Indiana, U.S.
- Origin: Carrboro, North Carolina, U.S.
- Died: February 16, 2024 (aged 57) Carrboro, North Carolina, U.S.
- Genres: Rockabilly; Roots rock Blues-rock
- Occupations: Musician; Singer-songwriter; Multi-instrumentalist
- Instruments: Guitar and piano
- Years active: 1983–2024
- Labels: Norton Records; Bloodshot Records; Third Man Records
- Website: Bloodshot Record: Dex Romweber

John Michael Dexter Romweber II (June 18, 1966 – February 16, 2024) was an American rockabilly and roots rock musician (primarily playing electric guitar) from Carrboro, North Carolina. Dex was best known as one-half of the seminal two-piece Flat Duo Jets. He fronted the Dex Romweber Duo with his older sister Sara Romweber.

== Early life and education ==
Romweber was born in Batesville, Indiana, the youngest of seven children. The family lived in Florida, moving to Carrboro, North Carolina in 1977. He attended Culbreth Junior High School and Chapel Hill High School, bringing a style different from the "preppy" campus.

Romweber's mother was a pianist who encouraged her son's interest in music and purchased his equipment. His first band, started in the family's cellar, with classmate Hunter Landen (The Bad Checks) on vocals. When the duo decided they needed a drummer, they called his sister Sara and pulled together some pots and pans from the kitchen. At the time Romweber was 10 years old and his sister was 12. Soon after, Romweber joined with Chris "Crow" Smith on drums to form The Remainz.

Romweber's next band, Crash Landen and The Kamikazees ("Kamikazees" was unintentionally misspelled, but it stuck), featured Hunter "Crash" Landen on vocals, with bassist Tony "Tone" Mayer (Good Old Chicken Wire Gang Boys Band Brothers), sister Sara on drums, and Eric Peterson on guitar. Soon Sara joined another band, and drums fell to a succession of drummers including Mike Krause, Michael Rank, and Hunter Landen after Romweber had taken over vocal duties.

== Career ==
=== The Flat Duo Jets ===
Dexter began playing with Chris "Crow" Smith, with material culled mainly from his family's record collection. They called themselves The Flat Duo Jets, after hearing Gene Vincent refer to his Gretsch Duo Jet guitar.

The Flat Duo Jets' first release, In Stereo, was recorded live in the studio in 1985 and originally released on cassette by Dolphin Records. The band was also featured around this time on MTV's The Cutting Edge, in a segment directed by Jonathan Dayton and Valerie Faris (who later went on to direct Little Miss Sunshine). Relocating shortly to Athens, Georgia, the band made an appearance in the film Athens, GA: Inside Out, alongside other well-known Athens bands such as R.E.M. and The B-52's. Though recorded live to two tracks in a garage in the late 80s, the band's full-length debut LP, the self-titled Flat Duo Jets, was not released until 1990. In support of the album, the Flat Duo Jets went on a national tour opening for The Cramps, whom Dexter has cited as an early influence. 1990 also saw the band make an appearance on Late Night with David Letterman, where they performed a high-energy cover of Benny Joy's "Wild Wild Lover". Their second LP, Go Go Harlem Baby, was produced by Jim Dickinson in 1992, and has been acknowledged as a huge influence on Jack White of The White Stripes, not least in the documentary It Might Get Loud. In the film, Jack White plays the record for Led Zeppelin's Jimmy Page and U2's The Edge, playing the Flat Duo Jets' version of the traditional "Froggie Went A-Courtin'" and discussing the impact that the band had on him. The film also features footage from their appearance in Athens, GA: Inside/Out.

In the late 1990s, The Flat Duo Jets signed a major label contract with Outpost Records, a now defunct imprint of Geffen Records. The result was 1998's Lucky Eye, produced by Scott Litt and Chris Stamey, which demonstrated a markedly different approach from their previous lo-fi efforts. The album featured a more polished sound for the band, accompanied by horn and string arrangements. Poor album sales were met with disappointment by the band, and it was shortly after the release that, after nearly 15 years as a band, Dexter and Crow went separate ways. Dexter maintained that the primary reason for the split was embezzlement of the band's proceeds on the part of Crow, though Crow disputes this.

=== Solo projects ===
In 2001, Dexter finally resurfaced with a new solo album, Chased By Martians, followed by Blues That Defy My Soul in 2004. Around this time, Dexter's influence was beginning to surface in interviews with artists like Neko Case, Cat Power and Jack White. Dexter has described his reaction to this influence as like being "locked away in a Gothic castle for many years" and "living in such isolation that I haven't even noticed." In 2006, Dexter released the album Piano, which consisted of 13 original classical piano compositions in the style of Chopin.

Also in 2006, a documentary about Dex and The Flat Duo Jets began playing at film festivals. Upon completion of Athens, GA: Inside/Out in 1987, director Tony Gayton began filming an untitled documentary of the Flat Duo Jets' national tour. After funding for the film fell through, production ceased and the film was forgotten. Funding the rest of the film himself, Gayton met up with Dexter in Los Angeles sixteen years later, and filmed new interviews with the intention of completing the film. The film, entitled Two Headed Cow, was eventually completed using a recovered VHS version of the original 16mm black-and-white footage, edited together with new interviews with Dexter, detailing his life and career, as well as performances in and around Los Angeles and interviews with Jack White, Exene Cervenka of X, Cat Power and Neko Case. As of 2009, the film has yet to be picked up for distribution, though it had a brief run on DOC: The Documentary Channel.

Dexter's band, The Dex Romweber Duo, began as Dexter and drummer Crash LaResh, who performed with Dexter from 1995 to 2007. The original Duo toured extensively and recorded several 7 inch releases and recorded two full-length albums (Chased By Martians and Blues That Defy My Soul), but these were credited as solo Dex Romweber releases. Crash LaResh left the band in 2007 and was replaced by Dexter's sister, Sara Romweber. In 2009, the pair released their debut album, Ruins of Berlin, on Bloodshot Records. The album featured guest appearances from Exene Cervenka, Cat Power, Neko Case, and longtime friend Rick Miller of Southern Culture on the Skids. The band toured the U.S. twice in support of the record, playing support for The Detroit Cobras on the second tour.

On the April 29 and 30, 2009, Dex and Sara were invited to record at Jack White's Third Man Records in Nashville, Tennessee, and they put out a 7-inch vinyl as part of Third Man Records' new "Blue Series". The sessions resulted in the Romweber original "The Wind Did Move", featuring Jack White on bass, background vocals and the saw, while the record's b-side was a cover of 1930s blues woman Geeshie Wiley's "Last Kind Words Blues", on which Dex and Jack share guitar and vocal duties. It was released on vinyl on June 9, 2009, and on iTunes shortly after. Dexter and Sara also returned to Nashville in 2010 to play a show at Jack White's live venue. The show was recorded onto 8-track reel-to-reel analog tape and is available on vinyl from Third Man Records.

In 2011, the Dex Romweber Duo released their second album on Bloodshot Records, titled Is That You in the Blue?.

Romweber also fronted Dexter Romweber and The New Romans, an ensemble of 7 musicians and 3 female backing vocalists that began in 2006. They have released one limited CD called "Night Tide" and mainly play shows in their home state of North Carolina, more specifically in The Research Triangle area of Chapel Hill, Raleigh, and Durham. The music is diverse, drawing influences from jazz, surf, early instrumentals, Bill Haley, Ella Fitzgerald, and even Chopin. The band continued to rehearse and experiment every Thursday night in Romweber's garage.

In 2016, Romweber released the record Carrboro on Bloodshot Records.

== Personal life and death ==
His older brother, Joe Romweber, was the lead singer for UV Prom and Eraserhead, while his sister Sara Romweber was a member of Let's Active and Snatches of Pink.

Romweber died on February 16, 2024, from an apparent cardiac arrest, at the age of 57, in his Carrboro home.

== Equipment ==
Romweber played the Silvertone 1448, which was built by Danelectro for Sears to sell under their Silvertone name.

== Discography ==
=== Flat Duo Jets ===
- In Stereo (1985)
- Flat Duo Jets (1990)
- Go Go Harlem Baby (1992)
- Safari (1993)
- White Trees (1993)
- Introducing the Flat Duo Jets (1995)
- Red Tango (1996)
- Wild Blue Yonder (1998)
- Lucky Eye (1998)
- Two Headed Cow (2008)
- Wild Wild Love (2017, Daniel 13)

=== Dex Romweber Duo ===
- "Empty Heart"/"Heart Of Stone" (split 7-inch with ? and the Mysterians; part of Norton's "Rolling Stones Cover" series) (2003)
- Dexter Romweber Duo and Throw Rag – Twelve Bad Studs (a 12-inch split release) with Crash LaResh on Drums (Demonbeach, released c. 2004)
- Ruins of Berlin (2009)
- Live at Third Man (2010)
- Is That You in the Blue? (2011)
- Images 13 (2014)

=== Solo discography ===
- Folk Songs: Solo Collection (1996)
- Chased by Martians (2001) with Crash LaResh on drums
- Blues That Defy My Soul (2004) with Crash LaResh on drums
- Piano (2006)
- Carrboro (2016)
- Good Thing Goin' (2023)
