= Benny Joy =

Background information
- Birth name: Benjamin Eidson
- Born: November 5, 1935; Atlanta, Georgia, United States
- Died: October 24, 1988 (aged 52)
- Genres: Rockabilly
- Occupation(s): Musician, songwriter
- Instrument: Guitar
- Years active: 1950s
- Labels: Tri-Dec, Dixie, Antler, Buck Ram, Decca

Benjamin Eidson, known professionally as Benny Joy (November 5, 1935 – October 24, 1988) was an American rockabilly guitarist and singer who released three singles in his recording career, and was popular regionally in Florida. As a result of the rockabilly revival in England, Joy's material was met with renewed interest.

== Biography ==
Joy was born in Atlanta, Georgia, United States, soon moving with his family to Tampa Bay, Florida, where he was taught to play guitar by his neighbors. He performed on the local music club circuit, quickly gaining a reputation for his spontaneous dancing theatrics, and meeting contemporary guitarist Big John Taylor. The manager of the independent record label TRI-DEC Records, Daz Dodds, was encouraged to sign the two musicians, which resulted in several demos accompanied by Taylor, including Joy's best-known song "Spin the Bottle" being released as a single in 1957 to regional success. Much of Joy's material from the recording sessions, which was mostly self-composed, such as "Little Red Book", "Hey High School Baby" and "Miss Bobby Sox" had a common theme revolved around teenage angst.

In 1958, Joy switched to Ram Records, releasing his second single the Buddy Holly-influenced "Ittie Bittie Everything". Also during the year, he became one of the earliest rockabilly music artists to tour Europe as Joy supported the Platters, Barry De Vorzon, and Raymond Scott, among others. Joy followed it up with a similar tour six weeks later in the summer of 1959, by which time his final single "Crash the Party" was issued on Decca Records to both the U.S. and Europe.

Joy failed to have a breakout record and began working as a disk jockey and on the television program American Bandstand. He also became a songwriter, penning several songs for Marty Robbins, Jackie Wilson, Charlie Rich, Burl Ives, Debbie Reynolds, Johnny Rivers, and Carl Smith.

As a result of England's rockabilly revival, Joy's recordings are championed among record collectors. His material has been made more accessible as much of his recordings are featured on the compilation albums Crash the Rockabilly Party and the five-LP collection, The Benny Joy Story 1957–61. One of his 1958 recordings, "Dark Angel", was included in another compilation album, Hillbillies in Hell: Country Music's Tormented Testament (2016).

He died in October 1988, from cancer at the age of 52.

== Discography ==
=== Singles ===
- 1957 – "Spin the Bottle" b/w "Hey' ... High School Baby!" – Tri-Dec 8667
- 1958 - "Spin the bottle" b/w "Steady with betty" - Dixie 45-2001
- 1958 – "Crash the Party" b/w "Little Red Book" – Antler DJ-41X45
- 1959 - "Ittie bittie everything" b/w "Money Money" - With Big John Taylor - Buck Ram BRP 1000
- 1961 - "Sincerely Your Friend" b/w "New York-Hey Hey" - Decca 31199
- 1961 - "You Go Your Way (And I'll Go Mine)" b/w "Birds Of A Feather Fly Together" - Decca 31280
- 1963 - "Somebody Else's Heartache" b/w "I'm Of No More Use To You Old Death" - Dot 45-16445

=== Compilation albums ===
- Rockin' and Rollin' with Benny Joy, Collector Records, CLCD 4401 (1992)
- Crash the Rockabilly Party, Ace, CDCHD 703 (1998)
